= 2012 European Truck Racing Championship =

28th edition of the European Truck racing competition

Seasons
- ← 2011 2013 →

The 2012 FIA European Truck Racing Championship was a motor racing championship using highly tuned tractor units producing over 1000 bhp. It was the 28th year of the championship and Jochen Hahn won the title for the second year with MAN.

== Teams and drivers ==
No.	Driver	Team	Manufacturer	Rounds
1	(Germany) Jochen Hahn	Castrol Team Hahn Racing	MAN	All
2	(Spain) Antonio Albacete	Equipo Cepsa	MAN	All
3	(Czech Republic) Adam Lacko	MKR Technology	Renault	All
4	(Germany) Markus Östreich	MKR Technology	Renault	All
5	(Czech Republic) David Vršecký	Buggyra Int. Racing System	Freightliner	All
6	(Switzerland) Markus Bösiger	MKR Technology	Renault	All
9	(Russia) Alex Lvov	Frankie Oxxo Truck Racing Team	MAN	6-8
10	(France) Anthony Janiec	Team 14	Renault	1–6,8-11
11	(France) Michel Bassanelli	Michel Bassanelli	Foden	4, 6, 9-10
11	(France) Jean-Christophe Quiret	Michel Bassanelli	Foden	2–3, 8, 11
12	(Hungary) Norbert Kiss	Frankie Oxxo Truck Racing Team	MAN	3–5, 7-11
14	(Belgium) Jean-Pierre Blaise	BJP Racing	Renault	1–2, 4–6, 8-11
15	(Finland) Mika Mäkinen	Mi-Ka Racing Team	MAN	All
16	(Czech Republic) Frankie Vojtíšek	Frankie Oxxo Truck Racing Team	MAN	3–5, 7-11
17	(France) Olivier Bouzige	Olivier Bouzige	Renault	2, 5–6, 10-11
17	(France) Dominique Orsini	Olivier Bouzige	Renault	4, 8-9
18	(France) Jérémy Robineau	Team Robineau	MAN	2, 4–5, 8-11
18	(France) Thomas Robineau	Team Robineau	MAN	6
19	(France) Dominique Lachèze	Truck Sport Lutz Bernau	MAN	All
20	(Spain) Javier Mariezcurrena	Javier Mariezcurrena	MAN	3-4, 10-11
21	(United Kingdom) Matthew Summerfield	Team Summerfield Truck Sport	MAN	1, 5, 9, 11
22	(United Kingdom) Steve Thomas	Team Thomas Racing	MAN	5, 9
23	(Spain) Jose Bermejo	Jose Bermejo	MAN	3-4, 6-11
24	(Germany) Ellen Lohr	Tankpool 24 Racing	Mercedes-Benz	2, 4–11
25	(Russia) Iurii Egorov	Buggyra Int. Racing System	Freighliner	6-7, 11
25	(Russia) Mikhail Konovalov	Buggyra Int. Racing System	Freighliner	7
26	(United Kingdom) David Jenkins	Jenkins Motorsport	MAN	5
27	(Germany) Gerd Körber	Gerd Körber	Iveco	2, 6, 8, 11
28	(Germany) Heinz-Werner Lenz	Heinz-Werner Lenz	Mercedes-Benz	6
29	(France) Ludovic Faure	Lion Truck Racing	MAN	6
30	(Spain) Alberto Vila Monteserin	Alberto Vila Monteserin	Mercedes-Benz	3, 10
31	(Spain) Enrique Alberto Vila Monteserin	Enrique Alberto Vila Monteserin	Mercedes-Benz	3, 10
32	(Netherlands) Erwin Kleinnagelvoort	EK-truckrace	Scania	3–4, 6–11
33	(Spain) Orlando Rodriguez Ruiz	Orlando Rodriguez Ruiz	Mercedes-Benz	3, 10
35	(Spain) David Marco Bermejo	David Marco Bermejo	MAN	3, 10
36	(Spain) Pedro Ignacio Garcia Marco	Pedro Ignacio Garcia Marco	Iveco	3, 10
37	(Spain) David Felipe Plaza	David Felipe Plaza	MAN	3, 10
39	(Portugal) Eduardo Rodrigues	Eduardo Rodrigues	MAN	3, 10
40	(Portugal) José Rodrigues	José Rodrigues	MAN	3, 10
41	(France) Lionel Montagne	Team Aravi	Renault	6, 9
42	(Netherlands) Cees Zandbergen	Cees Zandbergen	Scania	6, 9
43	(France) Jose Fernandes	Jose Fernandes	Renault	9-10
44	(Germany) Steffi Halm	Lion Truck Racing	MAN	6
45	(Czech Republic) Michal Matejovsky	Buggyra Int. Racing System	Freighliner	8, 10
66	(France) Jean-Philippe Belloc	Lion Truck Racing	MAN	4
77	(Germany) René Reinert	Reinert Racing	MAN	All
79	(United Kingdom) Luke Taylor	Luke Taylor	Renault	5

== Calendar and winners ==
Round		Circuit	Date	Pole position	Fastest lap	Winning driver	Winning team
1	R1	(Turkey) Istanbul Park	May 12–13	(Germany) Jochen Hahn		(Germany) Jochen Hahn	(Germany) Team Hahn Racing
1	R2	(Turkey) Istanbul Park	May 12–13			(Germany) Jochen Hahn	(Germany) Team Hahn Racing
1	R3	(Turkey) Istanbul Park	May 12–13	(Germany) Jochen Hahn		(Germany) Jochen Hahn	(Germany) Team Hahn Racing
1	R4	(Turkey) Istanbul Park	May 12–13			(Germany) Jochen Hahn	(Germany) Team Hahn Racing
2	R1	(Italy) Misano World Circuit	May 19–20	(Germany) Jochen Hahn	(Germany) Jochen Hahn	(Germany) Jochen Hahn	(Germany) Team Hahn Racing
2	R2	(Italy) Misano World Circuit	May 19–20		(Germany) Jochen Hahn	(Czech Republic) David Vršecký	(Czech Republic) Buggyra Int. Racing System
2	R3	(Italy) Misano World Circuit	May 19–20	(Germany) Jochen Hahn	(Czech Republic) David Vršecký	(Spain) Antonio Albacete	(Spain) Equipo Cepsa
2	R4	(Italy) Misano World Circuit	May 19–20		(Germany) Jochen Hahn	(Czech Republic) David Vršecký	(Czech Republic) Buggyra Int. Racing System
3	R1	(Spain) Circuito del Jarama	June 9–10	(Germany) Jochen Hahn	(Germany) Jochen Hahn	(Germany) Jochen Hahn	(Germany) Team Hahn Racing
3	R2	(Spain) Circuito del Jarama	June 9–10		(Spain) Antonio Albacete	(Spain) Antonio Albacete	(Spain) Equipo Cepsa
3	R3	(Spain) Circuito del Jarama	June 9–10	(Germany) Jochen Hahn	(Germany) Jochen Hahn	(Germany) Jochen Hahn	(Germany) Team Hahn Racing
3	R4	(Spain) Circuito del Jarama	June 9–10		(Czech Republic) David Vršecký	(Finland) Mika Mäkinen	(Finland) Mi-Ka Racing Team
4	R1	(France) Circuit Paul Armagnac	June 23–24	(Spain) Antonio Albacete	(Czech Republic) David Vršecký	(Spain) Antonio Albacete	(Spain) Equipo Cepsa
4	R2	(France) Circuit Paul Armagnac	June 23–24		(France) Dominique Lachèze	(France) Dominique Lachèze	(Germany) Truck Sport Lutz Bernau
4	R3	(France) Circuit Paul Armagnac	June 23–24	(Spain) Antonio Albacete	(Germany) Jochen Hahn	(Spain) Antonio Albacete	(Spain) Equipo Cepsa
4	R4	(France) Circuit Paul Armagnac	June 23–24		(Switzerland) Markus Bösiger	(France) Anthony Janiec	(France) Team 14
5	R1	(United Kingdom) Donington Park	June 30–July 1	(Germany) Jochen Hahn	(Germany) Jochen Hahn	(Germany) Jochen Hahn	(Germany) Team Hahn Racing
5	R2	(United Kingdom) Donington Park	June 30–July 1		(Germany) Jochen Hahn	(Czech Republic) David Vršecký	(Czech Republic) Buggyra Int. Racing System
5	R3	(United Kingdom) Donington Park	June 30–July 1	(Germany) Jochen Hahn	(Spain) Antonio Albacete	(Spain) Antonio Albacete	(Spain) Equipo Cepsa
5	R4	(United Kingdom) Donington Park	June 30–July 1		(Germany) Jochen Hahn	(Hungary) Norbert Kiss	(Czech Republic) Frankie Oxxo Truck Racing Team
6	R1	(Germany) Nürburgring	July 14–15	(Spain) Antonio Albacete	(Germany) Jochen Hahn	(Czech Republic) Adam Lacko	(Czech Republic) MKR Technology
6	R2	(Germany) Nürburgring	July 14–15		(Germany) Jochen Hahn	(Spain) Antonio Albacete	(Spain) Equipo Cepsa
6	R3	(Germany) Nürburgring	July 14–15	(Czech Republic) David Vršecký	(Spain) Antonio Albacete	(Germany) Jochen Hahn	(Germany) Team Hahn Racing
6	R4	(Germany) Nürburgring	July 14–15		(France) Dominique Lachèze	(Germany) Markus Östreich	(Czech Republic) MKR Technology
7	R1	(Russia) Smolensk Ring	July 28–29	(Spain) Antonio Albacete	(Spain) Antonio Albacete	(Spain) Antonio Albacete	(Spain) Equipo Cepsa
7	R2	(Russia) Smolensk Ring	July 28–29		(Germany) Jochen Hahn	(Germany) Rene Reinert	(Germany) Reinert Racing
7	R3	(Russia) Smolensk Ring	July 28–29	(Spain) Antonio Albacete	(Spain) Antonio Albacete	(Germany) Jochen Hahn	(Germany) Team Hahn Racing
7	R4	(Russia) Smolensk Ring	July 28–29			(Germany) Jochen Hahn	(Germany) Team Hahn Racing
8	R1	(Czech Republic) Autodrom Most	September 1–2	(Spain) Antonio Albacete	(Germany) Jochen Hahn	(Spain) Antonio Albacete	(Spain) Equipo Cepsa
8	R2	(Czech Republic) Autodrom Most	September 1–2		(Spain) Antonio Albacete	(Spain) Antonio Albacete	(Spain) Equipo Cepsa
8	R3	(Czech Republic) Autodrom Most	September 1–2	(Germany) Jochen Hahn	(Germany) Jochen Hahn	(Germany) Jochen Hahn	(Germany) Team Hahn Racing
8	R4	(Czech Republic) Autodrom Most	September 1–2			(Czech Republic) David Vršecký	(Czech Republic) Buggyra Int. Racing System
9	R1	(Belgium) Circuit Zolder	September 22–23	(Germany) Jochen Hahn	(Germany) Jochen Hahn	(Germany) Jochen Hahn	(Germany) Team Hahn Racing
9	R2	(Belgium) Circuit Zolder	September 22–23		(Germany) Jochen Hahn	(Switzerland) Markus Bösiger	(Czech Republic) MKR Technology
9	R3	(Belgium) Circuit Zolder	September 22–23	(Spain) Antonio Albacete	(Germany) Jochen Hahn	(Spain) Antonio Albacete	(Spain) Equipo Cepsa
9	R4	(Belgium) Circuit Zolder	September 22–23		(Germany) Jochen Hahn	(Czech Republic) Adam Lacko	(Czech Republic) MKR Technology
10	R1	(Spain) Circuito del Jarama	October 6–7	(Germany) Jochen Hahn	(Germany) Jochen Hahn	(Germany) Jochen Hahn	(Germany) Team Hahn Racing
10	R2	(Spain) Circuito del Jarama	October 6–7		(Germany) Jochen Hahn	(Hungary) Norbert Kiss	(Czech Republic) Frankie Oxxo Truck Racing Team
10	R3	(Spain) Circuito del Jarama	October 6–7	(Germany) Jochen Hahn	(Germany) Jochen Hahn	(Germany) Jochen Hahn	(Germany) Team Hahn Racing
10	R4	(Spain) Circuito del Jarama	October 6–7		(Germany) Jochen Hahn	(Hungary) Norbert Kiss	(Czech Republic) Frankie Oxxo Truck Racing Team
11	R1	(France) Bugatti Circuit	October 13–14	(Spain) Antonio Albacete	(Germany) Jochen Hahn	(Germany) Jochen Hahn	(Germany) Team Hahn Racing
11	R2	(France) Bugatti Circuit	October 13–14		(Spain) Antonio Albacete	(Hungary) Norbert Kiss	(Czech Republic) Frankie Oxxo Truck Racing Team
11	R3	(France) Bugatti Circuit	October 13–14	(Switzerland) Markus Bösiger	(Czech Republic) David Vršecký	(Switzerland) Markus Bösiger	(Czech Republic) MKR Technology
11	R4	(France) Bugatti Circuit	October 13–14		(Hungary) Norbert Kiss	(Hungary) Norbert Kiss	(Czech Republic) Frankie Oxxo Truck Racing Team

== Championship standings ==
=== Drivers Championship ===
Points were awarded on a 20, 15, 12, 10, 8, 6, 4, 3, 2, 1 basis to the top 10 finishers in races 1 & 3 of each meeting; and on a 10, 9, 8, 7, 6, 5, 4, 3, 2, 1 basis to the top 10 finishers in races 2 & 4 of each meeting. All scores counted towards the championship.

Pos	Driver	IST (Turkey)				MIS (Italy)				JAR (Spain)				NOG (France)				DON (United Kingdom)				NÜR (Germany)				SMO (Russia)				MOS (Czech Republic)				ZOL (Belgium)				JAR (Spain)				BUG (France)				Pts
1	(Germany) Jochen Hahn	1	1	1	1	1	13	2	3	1	16	1	4	2	5	2	10	1	3	3	4	3	3	1	4	2	6	1	1	2	4	1	6	1	3	2	2	1	3	1	4	1	5	Ret	5	517
2	(Spain) Antonio Albacete	2	3	2	2	2	3	1	5	2	1	3	2	1	7	1	12	2	6	1	5	2	1	3	6	1	3	2	3	1	1	2	4	Ret	5	1	3	2	4	2	3	19	7	5	Ret	468
3	(Czech Republic) Adam Lacko	3	2	4	6	4	4	4	4	18	5	4	7	5	2	3	5	3	Ret	6	6	1	10	4	10	4	5	4	5	Ret	6	5	7	2	4	4	1	7	2	5	2	Ret	8	2	3	330
4	(Germany) Markus Östreich	5	5	3	3	3	2	3	2	3	4	2	6	3	6	Ret	3	Ret	16	2	3	Ret	5	7	1	6	4	6	9	3	DSQ	4	2	5	2	5	5	3	5	4	7	6	4	22	Ret	311
5	(Czech Republic) David Vršecký	6	4	Ret	4	5	1	5	1	Ret	3	6	5	6	4	12	9	4	1	5	2	4	Ret	2	5	5	2	5	6	4	2	6	1	3	6	Ret	8	11	10	Ret	9	2	6	4	4	284
6	(Switzerland) Markus Bösiger	4	7	6	Ret	Ret	5	7	6	4	6	5	3	4	8	4	7	5	5	4	8	7	7	Ret	7	3	13	3	2	5	Ret	3	5	8	1	3	13	5	6	3	5	4	Ret	1	6	282
7	(Finland) Mika Mäkinen	8	6	7	5	8	Ret	8	8	6	2	7	1	7	3	10	4	9	10	9	15	5	4	9	11	7	7	7	8	8	19	12	13	9	7	8	4	10	16	8	Ret	5	3	6	13	160
8	(France) Dominique Lachèze	7	10	5	11	6	10	12	7	5	8	13	15	8	1	5	Ret	6	2	10	Ret	8	Ret	8	2	9	10	8	4	6	3	7	8	6	15	6	10	4	8	6	14	7	19	18	12	159
9	(France) Anthony Janiec	9	8	9	8	7	9	6	DSQ	19	Ret	9	8	14	10	6	1	7	4	7	7	9	6	6	20					Ret	5	10	Ret	10	Ret	16	7	6	7	9	6	3	2	3	2	147
10	(Hungary) Norbert Kiss									20	DNS	8	Ret	12	11	7	15	8	7	8	1					DNS	DNS	14	11	9	9	9	9	4	11	Ret	18	8	1	7	1	8	1	8	1	98
11	(Germany) Gerd Korber					9	6	9	9													6	2	5	3					7	7	8	3									10	9	10	7	69
12	(Germany) Rene Reinert	10	9	10	9	12	7	11	12	9	10	Ret	Ret	13	9	8	Ret	13	Ret	14	11	18	15	Ret	16	8	1	9	7	10	8	11	DSQ	7	14	7	6	9	9	27	10	12	14	12	9	61
13	(Spain) Javier Mariezcurrena									7	15	22	9	9	Ret	9	2																					16	13	10	8	9	12	9	Ret	27
14	(France) Jérémy Robineau					11	8	10	10					11	13	Ret	16	10	9	Ret	10									11	11	16	15	12	10	9	11	12	15	13	13	14	Ret	14	10	14
15	(United Kingdom) Matthew Summerfield	11	11	8	7													11	8	13	9													DNS	DNS	DNS	DNS					13	11	17	11	12
16	(Spain) Jose Bermejo									10	9	10	17	15	16	14	8					17	Ret	18	13	11	11	11	10	14	14	17	16	18	Ret	12	Ret	20	14	15	17	17	16	19	Ret	12
17	(Belgium) Jean-Pierre Blaise	12	Ret	11	10	10	11	13	11					Ret	12	DSQ	14	12	12	11	12	12	13	19	Ret					13	18	13	11	11	8	11	19	Ret	DNS	Ret	15	11	10	11	8	11
18	(Czech Republic) Frankie Vojtíšek									11	Ret	12	10	17	15	11	11	15	15	17	14					DNS	12	12	12	Ret	13	Ret	14	13	9	10	9	13	11	11	11	Ret	13	7	14	11
19	(Portugal) José Rodrigues									8	7	11	DNS																									15	17	12	16					7
20	(France) Jean-Philippe Belloc													10	14	Ret	6																													6
21	(Germany) Ellen Lohr					13	12	14	Ret					16	19	13	13	16	13	Ret	DNS	11	9	13	14	DNS	DNS	DNS	DNS	16	15	Ret	DNS	16	13	15	Ret	17	18	16	27	16	15	13	15	5
22	(France) Thomas Robineau																					DSQ	17	17	12																					1
23	(Russia) Iurii Egorov																					22	16	16	15	10	9															15	17	16	18	0
24	(Czech Republic) Michal Matejovsky																													12	10	14	12					14	12	14	12					0
25	(France) Lionel Montagne																					15	11	11	Ret									14	Ret	14	12									0
26	(Spain) David Marco Bermejo									13	11	17	13																									Ret	23	22	23					0
27	(United Kingdom) David Jenkins																	14	11	15	13																									0
28	(Spain) David Felipe Plaza									Ret	Ret	14	11																									19	19	19	19					0
29	(United Kingdom) Steve Thomas																	DNS	DNS	12	Ret													15	12	13	14									0
30	(Portugal) Eduardo Rodrigues									12	Ret	15	12																									18	22	18	18					0
31	(Spain) Pedro Ignacio Garcia Marco									DSQ	12	16	14																									22	20	20	20					0
32	(France) Olivier Bouzige					14	14	Ret	13									17	14	Ret	DNS	23	DNS	Ret	19													25	25	Ret	24	Ret	20	21	17	0
33	(Spain) Alberto Vila Monteserin									17	13	18	DSQ																									28	28	26	26					0
34	(Netherlands) Cees Zandbergen																					16	14	15	21									Ret	DNS	17	Ret									0
35	(Spain) Enrique Alberto Vila Monteserin									15	14	21	DSQ																									27	27	25	25					0
36	(Spain) Orlando Rodriguez Ruiz									14	Ret	20	DSQ																									26	29	24	28					0
37	(Netherlands) Erwin Kleinnagelvoort									16	DSQ	DNS	Ret	Ret	17	Ret	DNS					20	19	20	Ret	DNS	DNS	DNS	DNS	DSQ	17	18	17	DNS	16	18	15	21	24	17	21	18	18	15	16	0
38	(France) Dominique Orsini													18	18	15	Ret													17	16	Ret	DNS	Ret	DNS	20	DNS									0
39	(France) Jean-Christophe Quiret					DNS	15	Ret	Ret	DSQ	DSQ	19	16																	DNS	DNS	19	Ret									20	21	20	19	0
40	(United Kingdom) Luke Taylor																	Ret	DNS	16	16																									0
41	(France) Michel Bassanelli													DNS	DNS	DNS	DNS					21	18	21	18									17	17	19	16	23	21	21	22					0
42	(France) Jose Fernandes																																	19	18	21	17	24	26	23	Ret					0
Pos	Driver	IST (Turkey)				MIS (Italy)				JAR (Spain)				NOG (France)				DON (United Kingdom)				NÜR (Germany)				SMO (Russia)				MOS (Czech Republic)				ZOL (Belgium)				JAR (Spain)				BUG (France)				Pts

Colour	Result
Gold	Winner
Silver	Second place
Bronze	Third place
Green	Points classification
Blue	Non-points classification
Blue	Non-classified finish (NC)
Purple	Retired, not classified (Ret)
Red	Did not qualify (DNQ)
Red	Did not pre-qualify (DNPQ)
Black	Disqualified (DSQ)
White	Did not start (DNS)
White	Withdrew (WD)
White	Race cancelled (C)
Blank	Did not practice (DNP)
Blank	Did not arrive (DNA)
Blank	Excluded (EX)

=== Teams' Championship ===
Points were awarded on the same scale as the Drivers' Championship, with non-registered teams being ignored.

Pos	Team	No.	IST (Turkey)				MIS (Italy)				JAR (Spain)				NOG (France)				DON (United Kingdom)				NÜR (Germany)				SMO (Russia)				MOS (Czech Republic)				ZOL (Belgium)				JAR (Spain)				BUG (France)				Pts
1	(Czech Republic) MKR Technology	3	3	2	4	6	4	4	4	4	18	5	4	7	5	2	3	5	3	Ret	6	6	1	10	4	10	4	5	4	5	Ret	6	5	7	2	4	4	1	7	2	5	2	Ret	8	2	3	1000
1	(Czech Republic) MKR Technology	4	5	5	3	3	3	2	3	2	3	4	2	6	3	6	Ret	3	Ret	16	2	3	Ret	5	7	1	6	4	6	9	3	DSQ	4	2	5	2	5	5	3	5	4	7	6	4	22	Ret	1000
2	(Czech Republic) / (France) Pneu Bösiger/Team 14	6	4	7	6	Ret	Ret	5	7	6	4	6	5	3	4	8	4	7	5	5	4	8	7	7	Ret	7	3	13	3	2	5	Ret	3	5	8	1	3	13	5	6	3	5	4	Ret	1	6	766
2	(Czech Republic) / (France) Pneu Bösiger/Team 14	10	9	8	9	8	7	9	6	DSQ	19	Ret	9	8	14	10	6	1	7	4	7	7	9	6	6	20					Ret	5	10	Ret	10	Ret	16	7	6	7	9	6	3	2	3	2	766
3	(France) Blaise / Bouzige Truck Racing	14					10	11	13	11					Ret	12	DSQ	14	12	12	11	12	12	13	19	Ret					13	18	13	11	11	8	11	19	Ret	DNS	Ret	15	11	10	11	8	341
3	(France) Blaise / Bouzige Truck Racing	17					14	14	Ret	13					18	18	15	Ret	17	14	Ret	DNS	23	DNS	Ret	19					17	16	Ret	DNS	Ret	DNS	20	DNS	25	25	Ret	24	Ret	20	21	17	341
Pos	Team	No.	IST (Turkey)				MIS (Italy)				JAR (Spain)				NOG (France)				DON (United Kingdom)				NÜR (Germany)				SMO (Russia)				MOS (Czech Republic)				ZOL (Belgium)				JAR (Spain)				BUG (France)				Pts

Colour	Result
Gold	Winner
Silver	Second place
Bronze	Third place
Green	Points classification
Blue	Non-points classification
Blue	Non-classified finish (NC)
Purple	Retired, not classified (Ret)
Red	Did not qualify (DNQ)
Red	Did not pre-qualify (DNPQ)
Black	Disqualified (DSQ)
White	Did not start (DNS)
White	Withdrew (WD)
White	Race cancelled (C)
Blank	Did not practice (DNP)
Blank	Did not arrive (DNA)
Blank	Excluded (EX)

== Bibliography ==
- Göttl, Thomas Paul (2012). Truck Sport Book 2012 (in English and German). Stuttgart: Motorbuch Verlag. ISBN 978-3-613-30723-0.
