= 2011 European Truck Racing Championship =

European sporting event

Seasons
- ← 2010 2012 →

The 2011 FIA European Truck Racing Championship was a multi-event motor racing championship for production based trucks held across Europe. The championship features a mix of professional motor racing teams and privately funded amateur drivers competing in highly modified versions of two-axle tractor units which conform to the technical regulations for the championship. It was the 27th European Truck Racing Championship season and began at Donington Park on April 22, with the finale at Le Mans on October 9 after ten events. The championship was won by Jochen Hahn, taking his first title.

== Teams and drivers ==
Late entries in italics. Only trucks that were entered before Round 6 were eligible for points.

Team	Manufacturer	No.	Drivers	Rounds
(Spain) Equipo Cepsa (Germany) Truck Sport Lutz Bernau	MAN	1	(Spain) Antonio Albacete	All
(Spain) Equipo Cepsa (Germany) Truck Sport Lutz Bernau	MAN	9	(Germany) Uwe Nittel	All
(Czech Republic) MKR Technology	Renault	2	(Switzerland) Markus Bösiger	All
(Czech Republic) MKR Technology	Renault	4	(Germany) Markus Östreich	All
(Germany) Team Hahn Racing	MAN	3	(Germany) Jochen Hahn	All
(Czech Republic) Buggyra Int. Racing System	Freightliner	5	(Czech Republic) David Vršecký	All
(Czech Republic) Buggyra Int. Racing System	Freightliner	6	(United Kingdom) Christopher Levett	All
(Czech Republic) MKR Team 14 Juniors	Renault	7	(Czech Republic) Adam Lacko	All
(Czech Republic) MKR Team 14 Juniors	Renault	10	(France) Anthony Janiec	All
(Austria) Truck Race Team Allgäuer	MAN	8	(Russia) Alex Lvov	All
(Austria) Truck Race Team Allgäuer	MAN	18	(United Kingdom) Stuart Oliver	All
(Hungary) Oxxo Racing (Finland) Mi-Ka Racing Team	MAN	12	(Hungary) Zoltan Birnbauer	1–5, 7
(Hungary) Oxxo Racing (Finland) Mi-Ka Racing Team	MAN	12	(Hungary) Norbert Kiss	8–10
(Hungary) Oxxo Racing (Finland) Mi-Ka Racing Team	MAN	16	(Finland) Mika Mäkinen	1–5, 7–10
(Belgium) BJP Racing	Renault	14	(Belgium) Jean-Pierre Blaise	1–5, 7–10
(Netherlands) EK-truckrace	Scania	15	(Netherlands) Erwin Kleinnagelvoort	1, 3–5, 7–10
(Spain) José Bermejo	MAN	17	(Spain) José Bermejo	All
(France) Team Orsini	Mercedes-Benz	19	(France) Florian Orsini	2–3, 6, 8–10
(France) Team Orsini	Mercedes-Benz	19	(France) Dominique Orsini	4, 7
(Spain) Javier Mariezcurrena	MAN	20	(Spain) Javier Mariezcurrena	3–4, 8–10
(France) Team Robineau	MAN	21	(France) Jérémy Robineau	2, 4–5, 7–8, 10
(Germany) Tankpool 24 Racing	Mercedes-Benz	22	(Germany) Stephanie Halm	2, 4–5, 7–10
(United Kingdom) Team Summerfield Truck Sport	MAN	23	(United Kingdom) Mathew Summerfield	1–5, 7–10
(United Kingdom) David Jenkins	MAN	24	(United Kingdom) David Jenkins	1
(United Kingdom) Steve Horne	MAN	25	(United Kingdom) Steve Horne	1
(United Kingdom) Richard Collett	MAN	26	(United Kingdom) Richard Collett	1
(Germany) Team Schwaben-Truck	Iveco	27	(Germany) Gerd Körber	2, 5, 8, 10
(France) Stephane Languillat	Renault	28	(France) Stephane Languillat	2, 5
(France) Lionel Montagne	Renault	29	(France) Lionel Montagne	2, 8
(France) Philippe Arlaud	Volvo	30	(France) Philippe Arlaud	3
(Spain) Enrique Vila Monteserin	Mercedes-Benz	31	(Spain) Enrique Vila Monteserin	3, 9
(Spain) Alberto Vila Monteserin	Mercedes-Benz	32	(Spain) Alberto Vila Monteserin	3, 9
(Spain) Orlando Rodriguez Ruiz	Mercedes-Benz	33	(Spain) Orlando Rodriguez Ruiz	3, 9
(France) Michel Bassanelli	DAF	34	(France) Michel Bassanelli	3, 9
(Spain) David Marco Bermejo	MAN	35	(Spain) David Marco Bermejo	3, 9
(Spain) Pedro Garcia	Iveco	36	(Spain) Pedro Garcia	3, 9
(Spain) Motor Club Circuito de Albacete	MAN	37	(Spain) David Felipe Plaza	3–4, 9
(France) Martial Defaye	DAF	38	(France) Martial Defaye	3
(Portugal) Eduardo Rodrigues	MAN	39	(Portugal) Eduardo Rodrigues	3, 9
(Portugal) José Rodrigues	MAN	40	(Portugal) José Rodrigues	3, 9
(Spain) Francisco Navarro	Renault	41	(Spain) Francisco Navarro	3, 9
(Netherlands) Cees Zandbergen	Scania	42	(Netherlands) Cees Zandbergen	4–5, 8
(Germany) Sascha Lenz	Mercedes-Benz	43	(Germany) Sascha Lenz	5, 8
(France) Jennifer Janiec	MAN	44	(France) Jennifer Janiec	5
(Germany) Heinz-Werner Lenz	Mercedes-Benz	45	(Germany) Heinz-Werner Lenz	7

== Calendar and winners ==
Round		Circuit	Date	Pole position	Fastest lap	Winning driver	Winning team
1	R1	(United Kingdom) Donington Park	April 22–24	(Germany) Markus Östreich	(Germany) Markus Östreich	(Germany) Markus Östreich	(Czech Republic) MKR Technology
1	R2	(United Kingdom) Donington Park	April 22–24		(Germany) Markus Östreich	(Spain) Antonio Albacete	(Spain) Equipo Cepsa
1	R3	(United Kingdom) Donington Park	April 22–24	(Germany) Markus Östreich	(Germany) Markus Östreich	(Germany) Markus Östreich	(Czech Republic) MKR Technology
1	R4	(United Kingdom) Donington Park	April 22–24		(Germany) Markus Östreich	(Germany) Jochen Hahn	(Germany) Team Hahn Racing
2	R1	(Italy) Misano World Circuit	May 21–22	(Germany) Jochen Hahn	(Germany) Jochen Hahn	(Germany) Jochen Hahn	(Germany) Team Hahn Racing
2	R2	(Italy) Misano World Circuit	May 21–22		(Germany) Jochen Hahn	(Germany) Jochen Hahn	(Germany) Team Hahn Racing
2	R3	(Italy) Misano World Circuit	May 21–22	(Germany) Jochen Hahn	(Germany) Jochen Hahn	(Germany) Jochen Hahn	(Germany) Team Hahn Racing
2	R4	(Italy) Misano World Circuit	May 21–22		(Germany) Jochen Hahn	(Germany) Jochen Hahn	(Germany) Team Hahn Racing
3	R1	(Spain) Circuito de Albacete	June 4–5	(Germany) Jochen Hahn	(Germany) Jochen Hahn	(Germany) Jochen Hahn	(Germany) Team Hahn Racing
3	R2	(Spain) Circuito de Albacete	June 4–5		(Germany) Uwe Nittel	(Russia) Alex Lvov	(Austria) Truck Race Team Allgäuer
3	R3	(Spain) Circuito de Albacete	June 4–5	(Germany) Jochen Hahn	(Germany) Jochen Hahn	(Germany) Jochen Hahn	(Germany) Team Hahn Racing
3	R4	(Spain) Circuito de Albacete	June 4–5		(Spain) Antonio Albacete	(Germany) Jochen Hahn	(Germany) Team Hahn Racing
4	R1	(France) Circuit Paul Armagnac	June 18–19	(Germany) Jochen Hahn	(Germany) Jochen Hahn	(Germany) Jochen Hahn	(Germany) Team Hahn Racing
4	R2	(France) Circuit Paul Armagnac	June 18–19		(Czech Republic) David Vršecký	(Czech Republic) David Vršecký	(Czech Republic) Buggyra Int. Racing System
4	R3	(France) Circuit Paul Armagnac	June 18–19	(Germany) Jochen Hahn	(Spain) Antonio Albacete	(Germany) Jochen Hahn	(Germany) Team Hahn Racing
4	R4	(France) Circuit Paul Armagnac	June 18–19		(Germany) Jochen Hahn	(Spain) Javier Mariezcurrena	(Spain) Javier Mariezcurrena
5	R1	(Germany) Nürburgring	July 8–10	(Germany) Jochen Hahn	(Germany) Jochen Hahn	(Germany) Jochen Hahn	(Germany) Team Hahn Racing
5	R2	(Germany) Nürburgring	July 8–10		(Czech Republic) David Vršecký	(Spain) Antonio Albacete	(Spain) Equipo Cepsa
5	R3	(Germany) Nürburgring	July 8–10	(Germany) Uwe Nittel	(Spain) Antonio Albacete	(Spain) Antonio Albacete	(Spain) Equipo Cepsa
5	R4	(Germany) Nürburgring	July 8–10		(Switzerland) Markus Bösiger	(Czech Republic) David Vršecký	(Czech Republic) Buggyra Int. Racing System
6	R1	(Russia) Smolensk Ring	July 30–31	(Spain) Antonio Albacete	(Germany) Jochen Hahn	(Spain) Antonio Albacete	(Spain) Equipo Cepsa
6	R2	(Russia) Smolensk Ring	July 30–31		(Germany) Uwe Nittel	(Germany) Markus Östreich	(Czech Republic) MKR Technology
6	R3	(Russia) Smolensk Ring	July 30–31	(Switzerland) Markus Bösiger	(Czech Republic) David Vršecký	(Germany) Jochen Hahn	(Germany) Team Hahn Racing
6	R4	(Russia) Smolensk Ring	July 30–31		(Czech Republic) David Vršecký	(Czech Republic) Adam Lacko	(Czech Republic) MKR Team 14 Juniors
7	R1	(Czech Republic) Autodrom Most	August 27–28	(Czech Republic) Adam Lacko	(Czech Republic) Adam Lacko	(Czech Republic) Adam Lacko	(Czech Republic) MKR Team 14 Juniors
7	R2	(Czech Republic) Autodrom Most	August 27–28		(Czech Republic) Adam Lacko	(Czech Republic) David Vršecký	(Czech Republic) Buggyra Int. Racing System
7	R3	(Czech Republic) Autodrom Most	August 27–28	(Switzerland) Markus Bösiger	(Switzerland) Markus Bösiger	(Switzerland) Markus Bösiger	(Czech Republic) MKR Technology
7	R4	(Czech Republic) Autodrom Most	August 27–28		(Switzerland) Markus Bösiger	(Russia) Alex Lvov	(Austria) Truck Race Team Allgäuer
8	R1	(Belgium) Circuit Zolder	September 17–18	(Czech Republic) Adam Lacko	(Spain) Antonio Albacete	(Spain) Antonio Albacete	(Spain) Equipo Cepsa
8	R2	(Belgium) Circuit Zolder	September 17–18		(Spain) Antonio Albacete	(Germany) Markus Östreich	(Czech Republic) MKR Technology
8	R3	(Belgium) Circuit Zolder	September 17–18	(Germany) Markus Östreich	(Spain) Antonio Albacete	(Spain) Antonio Albacete	(Spain) Equipo Cepsa
8	R4	(Belgium) Circuit Zolder	September 17–18		(Spain) Antonio Albacete	(Czech Republic) Adam Lacko	(Czech Republic) MKR Team 14 Juniors
9	R1	(Spain) Circuito del Jarama	October 1–2	(Switzerland) Markus Bösiger	(Switzerland) Markus Bösiger	(Switzerland) Markus Bösiger	(Czech Republic) MKR Technology
9	R2	(Spain) Circuito del Jarama	October 1–2		(Spain) Antonio Albacete	(Spain) Antonio Albacete	(Spain) Equipo Cepsa
9	R3	(Spain) Circuito del Jarama	October 1–2	(Czech Republic) David Vršecký	(Germany) Jochen Hahn	(Spain) Antonio Albacete	(Spain) Equipo Cepsa
9	R4	(Spain) Circuito del Jarama	October 1–2		(Spain) Antonio Albacete	(Hungary) Norbert Kiss	(Hungary) Oxxo Racing
10	R1	(France) Bugatti Circuit	October 8–9	(Czech Republic) Adam Lacko	(Czech Republic) Adam Lacko	(Czech Republic) David Vršecký	(Czech Republic) Buggyra Int. Racing System
10	R2	(France) Bugatti Circuit	October 8–9		(Spain) Antonio Albacete	(Czech Republic) Adam Lacko	(Czech Republic) MKR Team 14 Juniors
10	R3	(France) Bugatti Circuit	October 8–9	(Switzerland) Markus Bösiger	(Czech Republic) Adam Lacko	(Germany) Markus Östreich	(Czech Republic) MKR Technology
10	R4	(France) Bugatti Circuit	October 8–9		(Switzerland) Markus Bösiger	(Germany) Markus Östreich	(Czech Republic) MKR Technology

== Championship standings ==
=== Drivers' Championship ===
Points were awarded on a 20, 15, 12, 10, 8, 6, 4, 3, 2, 1 basis to the top 10 finishers in races 1 & 3 of each meeting; and on a 10, 9, 8, 7, 6, 5, 4, 3, 2, 1 basis to the top 10 finishers in races 2 & 4 of each meeting. All scores counted towards the championship.

Pos	Driver	DON (United Kingdom)				MIS (Italy)				ALB (Spain)				NOG (France)				NÜR (Germany)				SMO (Russia)				MOS (Czech Republic)				ZOL (Belgium)				JAR (Spain)				BUG (France)				Pts
1	(Germany) Jochen Hahn	Ret	6	2	1	**1**	1	**1**	1	**1**	4	**1**	1	**1**	3	**1**	6	**1**	5	2	Ret	2	7	1	4	3	6	4	7	6	11	Ret	DNS	5	2	3	2	4	2	2	5	402
2	(Spain) Antonio Albacete	2	1	3	Ret	2	3	2	2	10	5	4	3	3	2	2	5	4	1	1	5	**1**	Ret	Ret	6	5	3	DSQ	9	1	2	1	3	3	1	1	5	5	9	DNS	DNS	355
3	(Czech Republic) Adam Lacko	5	2	Ret	17	4	4	6	Ret	3	3	2	7	4	5	7	2	5	6	5	3	5	Ret	2	1	**1**	4	3	6	**3**	3	8	**1**	4	3	4	3	**3**	1	3	Ret	317
4	(Germany) Markus Östreich	**1**	8	**1**	3	3	2	10	5	2	7	9	8	7	20	5	4	2	4	4	7	6	1	9	DSQ	7	Ret	2	4	4	1	**2**	18	2	6	Ret	Ret	11	Ret	1	1	287
5	(Czech Republic) David Vršecký	4	11	5	4	8	Ret	4	Ret	5	2	5	5	5	1	4	8	6	2	7	1	3	4	4	2	2	1	5	5	5	8	3	6	Ret	7	**2**	4	1	4	DNS	DNS	287
6	(Switzerland) Markus Bösiger	6	10	6	5	6	Ret	3	6	4	8	6	4	8	4	6	3	9	7	6	2	4	6	**3**	3	6	2	**1**	8	2	6	4	7	**1**	11	Ret	14	10	6	**5**	3	262
7	(Germany) Uwe Nittel	3	3	4	2	5	Ret	5	4	DSQ	9	3	17	2	6	3	7	3	3	**3**	DNS	10	5	6	11	8	Ret	6	3	13	7	Ret	DNS	6	4	Ret	8	2	5	DNS	DNS	215
8	(United Kingdom) Christopher Levett	12	4	17	6	10	Ret	7	3	9	11	7	9	6	9	10	9	8	10	8	4	8	2	8	Ret	13	Ret	7	2	7	5	9	10	7	5	10	10	7	8	6	6	129
9	(Russia) Alex Lvov	13	7	9	11	7	5	9	8	7	1	11	27	11	7	12	Ret	10	9	9	11	9	9	5	5	4	7	8	1	9	9	12	9	11	Ret	7	20	15	12	DNS	8	102
10	(France) Anthony Janiec	9	12	7	13	9	6	8	7	6	6	10	10	22	Ret	11	10	14	12	12	10	11	8	7	7	11	5	15	11	11	10	7	5	9	9	12	7	6	10	4	4	95
11	(United Kingdom) Stuart Oliver	10	14	8	8	Ret	7	11	Ret	8	Ret	8	2	9	8	9	11	11	8	11	8	7	3	10	9	9	8	9	10	Ret	DNS	10	8	8	10	5	DNS	12	11	DNS	10	79
12	(Hungary) Norbert Kiss																													8	4	6	4	12	8	8	1	8	3	7	2	63
13	(Germany) Gerd Körber					DNS	DNS	13	9									7	11	10	6									Ret	24	5	2					9	7	9	16	37
14	(Spain) Javier Mariezcurrena									12	10	13	6	10	10	8	1													16	16	Ret	14	16	14	9	9	13	DNS	8	7	32
15	(Finland) Mika Mäkinen	8	9	11	7	Ret	9	12	10	11	14	14	11	13	Ret	15	16	12	14	14	9					10	9	10	14	14	12	11	11	13	DSQ	11	12	14	15	DNS	9	20
16	(Spain) José Bermejo	17	18	16	14	12	13	21	13	DSQ	DSQ	EX	EX	14	13	17	Ret	16	DNS	Ret	DNS	12	10	11	8	12	Ret	12	15	17	15	17	Ret	10	15	6	6	18	Ret	DNS	DNS	16
17	(United Kingdom) Mathew Summerfield	7	5	10	Ret	DSQ	11	17	11	14	15	12	13	16	17	14	12	23	DSQ	13	Ret					15	14	11	13	15	13	18	13	15	16	Ret	13	22	DNS	11	13	11
18	(France) Jérémy Robineau					Ret	10	15	12					12	11	16	13	13	13	15	14					14	11	Ret	DSQ	10	17	14	15					16	14	10	11	4
19	(Belgium) Jean-Pierre Blaise	Ret	DNS	Ret	DNS	11	8	22	Ret	16	17	17	15	19	15	18	17	17	15	16	12					16	12	13	12	12	18	15	12	14	13	DNS	DNS	17	13	12	14	3
20	(Hungary) Zoltan Birnbauer	11	15	12	9	14	Ret	16	14	15	13	16	12	15	12	13	14	15	21	Ret	DNS					18	15	14	Ret													2
21	(France) Florian Orsini					DNS	DNS	19	15	19	20	19	18									13	Ret	Ret	10					21	21	21	Ret	Ret	18	15	DNS	21	18	15	15	1
22	(United Kingdom) David Jenkins	15	16	13	10																																					1
23	(Portugal) José Rodrigues									13	12	15	14																					Ret	12	13	11					0
24	(Germany) Stephanie Halm					NC	14	18	Ret					17	14	19	15	24	DNS	17	13					17	13	16	17	19	23	19	Ret	17	Ret	DSQ	17	19	16	13	12	0
25	(France) Lionel Montagne					13	12	14	Ret																					18	14	13	DNS									0
26	(United Kingdom) Steve Horne	14	13	14	12																																					0
27	(Netherlands) Erwin Kleinnagelvoort	16	19	15	15					17	24	25	16	18	16	Ret	Ret	21	16	18	17					20	17	19	19	DNS	20	20	17	18	17	17	15	20	17	14	DNS	0
28	(Spain) Pedro Garcia									27	Ret	26	19																					24	DSQ	14	16					0
29	(France) Stephane Languillat					15	15	20	16									18	18	21	DNS																					0
30	(Germany) Sascha Lenz																	19	17	19	15									20	19	16	16									0
31	(United Kingdom) Richard Collett	Ret	17	18	16																																					0
32	(France) Dominique Orsini													20	Ret	22	19									21	16	18	18													0
33	(Portugal) Eduardo Rodrigues									18	16	DSQ	Ret																					19	DSQ	Ret	18					0
34	(France) Jennifer Janiec																	20	19	20	16																					0
35	(Spain) Orlando Rodriguez Ruiz									26	DNS	29	22																					Ret	22	16	23					0
36	(Spain) David Felipe Plaza									22	18	18	24	Ret	18	20	20																	21	19	DSQ	19					0
37	(Netherlands) Cees Zandbergen													21	19	21	18	22	20	DSQ	DNS									Ret	22	22	Ret									0
38	(Spain) Alberto Vila Monteserin									Ret	26	23	23																					22	20	18	24					0
39	(France) Philippe Arlaud									21	19	20	Ret																													0
40	(Spain) Enrique Vila Monteserin									Ret	23	27	25																					23	21	19	25					0
41	(Spain) David Marco Bermejo									20	Ret	22	20																					DSQ	DSQ	DSQ	21					0
42	(France) Michel Bassanelli									23	22	21	21																					20	DSQ	DNS	22					0
43	(Spain) Francisco Navarro									25	25	28	28																					25	23	20	26					0
44	(France) Martial Defaye									24	21	24	26																													0
late entries – ineligible for points
	(Germany) Heinz-Werner Lenz																									19	10	17	16													0
Pos	Driver	DON (United Kingdom)				MIS (Italy)				ALB (Spain)				NOG (France)				NÜR (Germany)				SMO (Russia)				MOS (Czech Republic)				ZOL (Belgium)				JAR (Spain)				BUG (France)				Pts

Colour	Result
Gold	Winner
Silver	Second place
Bronze	Third place
Green	Points classification
Blue	Non-points classification
Blue	Non-classified finish (NC)
Purple	Retired, not classified (Ret)
Red	Did not qualify (DNQ)
Red	Did not pre-qualify (DNPQ)
Black	Disqualified (DSQ)
White	Did not start (DNS)
White	Withdrew (WD)
White	Race cancelled (C)
Blank	Did not practice (DNP)
Blank	Did not arrive (DNA)
Blank	Excluded (EX)

**Bold** - Pole
Italics - Fastest lap

=== Teams' Championship ===
Points were awarded on the same scale as the Drivers' Championship, with non-registered teams being ignored.

Pos	Team	No.	DON (United Kingdom)				MIS (Italy)				ALB (Spain)				NOG (France)				NÜR (Germany)				SMO (Russia)				MOS (Czech Republic)				ZOL (Belgium)				JAR (Spain)				BUG (France)				Pts
1	(Spain) / (Germany) Cepsa-Truck Sport Lutz Bernau	1	2	1	3	Ret	2	3	2	2	10	5	4	3	3	2	2	5	4	1	1	5	1	Ret	Ret	6	5	3	DSQ	9	1	2	1	3	3	1	1	5	5	9	DNS	DNS	680
1	(Spain) / (Germany) Cepsa-Truck Sport Lutz Bernau	9	3	3	4	2	5	Ret	5	4	DSQ	9	3	17	2	6	3	7	3	3	3	DNS	10	5	6	11	8	Ret	6	3	13	7	Ret	DNS	6	4	Ret	8	2	5	DNS	DNS	680
2	(Czech Republic) MKR Technology	2	6	10	6	5	6	Ret	3	6	4	8	6	4	8	4	6	3	9	7	6	2	4	6	3	3	6	2	1	8	2	6	4	7	1	11	Ret	14	10	6	5	3	654
2	(Czech Republic) MKR Technology	4	1	8	1	3	3	2	10	5	2	7	9	8	7	20	5	4	2	4	4	7	6	1	9	DSQ	7	Ret	2	4	4	1	2	18	2	6	Ret	Ret	11	Ret	1	1	654
3	(Czech Republic) MKR Team 14 Juniors	7	5	2	Ret	17	4	4	6	Ret	3	3	2	7	4	5	7	2	5	6	5	3	5	Ret	2	1	1	4	3	6	3	3	8	1	4	3	4	3	3	1	3	Ret	538
3	(Czech Republic) MKR Team 14 Juniors	10	9	12	7	13	9	6	8	7	6	6	10	10	22	Ret	11	10	14	12	12	10	11	8	7	7	11	5	15	11	11	10	7	5	9	9	12	7	6	10	4	4	538
4	(Czech Republic) Buggyra Int.Racing System	5	4	11	5	4	8	Ret	4	Ret	5	2	5	5	5	1	4	8	6	2	7	1	3	4	4	2	2	1	5	5	5	8	3	6	Ret	7	2	4	1	4	DNS	DNS	532
4	(Czech Republic) Buggyra Int.Racing System	6	12	4	17	6	10	Ret	7	3	9	11	7	9	6	9	10	9	8	10	8	4	8	2	8	Ret	13	Ret	7	2	7	5	9	10	7	5	10	10	7	8	6	6	532
5	(Hungary) / (Finland) OXXO-Z. Birnbauer/M. Mäkinen	12	11	15	12	9	14	Ret	16	14	15	13	16	12	15	12	13	14	15	21	Ret	DNS					18	15	14	Ret	8	4	6	4	12	8	8	1	8	3	7	2	221
5	(Hungary) / (Finland) OXXO-Z. Birnbauer/M. Mäkinen	16	8	9	11	7	Ret	9	12	10	11	14	14	11	13	Ret	15	16	12	14	14	9					10	9	10	14	14	12	11	11	13	DSQ	11	12	14	15	DNS	9	221
Pos	Team	No.	DON (United Kingdom)				MIS (Italy)				ALB (Spain)				NOG (France)				NÜR (Germany)				SMO (Russia)				MOS (Czech Republic)				ZOL (Belgium)				JAR (Spain)				BUG (France)				Pts

Colour	Result
Gold	Winner
Silver	Second place
Bronze	Third place
Green	Points classification
Blue	Non-points classification
Blue	Non-classified finish (NC)
Purple	Retired, not classified (Ret)
Red	Did not qualify (DNQ)
Red	Did not pre-qualify (DNPQ)
Black	Disqualified (DSQ)
White	Did not start (DNS)
White	Withdrew (WD)
White	Race cancelled (C)
Blank	Did not practice (DNP)
Blank	Did not arrive (DNA)
Blank	Excluded (EX)

== Bibliography ==
- Göttl, Thomas Paul (2011). Truck Sport Book 2011: Truck Race & Truck Trial Europameisterschaft (in English and German). Stuttgart: Motorbuch Verlag. ISBN 978-3-613-30682-0.
