= 2010 European Truck Racing Championship =

Seasons
- ← 2009 2011 →

The 2010 FIA European Truck Racing Championship was a multi-event motor racing championship for production based trucks held across Europe. The championship features a mix of professional motor racing teams and privately funded amateur drivers competing in highly modified versions of two-axle tractor units which conform to the technical regulations for the championship. It was the 26th European Truck Racing Championship season and began at Misano on May 23, with the finale at Jarama on October 3 after nine events. The championship was won by Antonio Albacete, taking his third title.

== Teams and drivers ==
No.	Driver	Team	Manufacturer	Rounds

Race drivers without fixed number, whose number is defined race by race:

No.	Driver	Team	Manufacturer	Rounds

== Calendar and winners ==
Round		Circuit	Date	Pole position	Fastest lap	Winning driver	Winning team
1	R1	(Italy) Misano World Circuit	May 22–23	(Germany) Jochen Hahn		(Switzerland) Markus Bösiger	(Czech Republic) MKR Technology
1	R2	(Italy) Misano World Circuit	May 22–23		Race cancelled (Note: Race cancelled due to unsafe track conditions)		
1	R3	(Italy) Misano World Circuit	May 22–23	(Switzerland) Markus Bösiger		(Switzerland) Markus Bösiger	(Czech Republic) MKR Technology
1	R4	(Italy) Misano World Circuit	May 22–23			(Spain) Antonio Albacete	(Spain) Equipo Cepsa
2	R1	(Spain) Circuito de Albacete	June 5–6	(Spain) Antonio Albacete		(Spain) Antonio Albacete	(Spain) Equipo Cepsa
2	R2	(Spain) Circuito de Albacete	June 5–6			(Germany) Jochen Hahn	(Germany) Team Hahn Oxxo Racing
2	R3	(Spain) Circuito de Albacete	June 5–6	(Spain) Antonio Albacete		(Spain) Antonio Albacete	(Spain) Equipo Cepsa
2	R4	(Spain) Circuito de Albacete	June 5–6			(Spain) Antonio Albacete	(Spain) Equipo Cepsa
3	R1	(France) Circuit Paul Armagnac	June 19–20	(Switzerland) Markus Bösiger		(Switzerland) Markus Bösiger	(Czech Republic) MKR Technology
3	R2	(France) Circuit Paul Armagnac	June 19–20			(Spain) Antonio Albacete	(Spain) Equipo Cepsa
3	R3	(France) Circuit Paul Armagnac	June 19–20	(Spain) Antonio Albacete		(Spain) Antonio Albacete	(Spain) Equipo Cepsa
3	R4	(France) Circuit Paul Armagnac	June 19–20			(Germany) Jochen Hahn	(Germany) Team Hahn Oxxo Racing
4	R1	(Germany) Nürburgring	July 24–25	(United Kingdom) Christopher Levett		(United Kingdom) Christopher Levett	(Germany) Truck Sport Lutz Bernau
4	R2	(Germany) Nürburgring	July 24–25			(Czech Republic) David Vršecký	(Czech Republic) Buggyra Int. Racing System
4	R3	(Germany) Nürburgring	July 24–25	(Spain) Antonio Albacete		(Spain) Antonio Albacete	(Spain) Equipo Cepsa
4	R4	(Germany) Nürburgring	July 24–25			(Germany) Markus Oestreich	(Czech Republic) MKR Technology
5	R1	(Russia) Smolensk Ring	August 7–8	(Spain) Antonio Albacete		(Spain) Antonio Albacete	(Spain) Equipo Cepsa
5	R2	(Russia) Smolensk Ring	August 7–8			(Germany) Jochen Hahn	(Germany) Team Hahn Oxxo Racing
5	R3	(Russia) Smolensk Ring	August 7–8	(Czech Republic) David Vršecký		(Germany) Jochen Hahn	(Germany) Team Hahn Oxxo Racing
5	R4	(Russia) Smolensk Ring	August 7–8			(Spain) Antonio Albacete	(Spain) Equipo Cepsa
6	R1	(Czech Republic) Autodrom Most	August 28–29	(Germany) Markus Oestreich		(Switzerland) Markus Bösiger	(Czech Republic) MKR Technology
6	R2	(Czech Republic) Autodrom Most	August 28–29			(Germany) Jochen Hahn	(Germany) Team Hahn Oxxo Racing
6	R3	(Czech Republic) Autodrom Most	August 28–29	(Germany) Markus Oestreich		(Switzerland) Markus Bösiger	(Czech Republic) MKR Technology
6	R4	(Czech Republic) Autodrom Most	August 28–29			(United Kingdom) Christopher Levett	(Germany) Truck Sport Lutz Bernau
7	R1	(Belgium) Circuit Zolder	September 11–12	(Switzerland) Markus Bösiger		(Switzerland) Markus Bösiger	(Czech Republic) MKR Technology
7	R2	(Belgium) Circuit Zolder	September 11–12			(Spain) Antonio Albacete	(Spain) Equipo Cepsa
7	R3	(Belgium) Circuit Zolder	September 11–12	(Switzerland) Markus Bösiger		(Germany) Markus Oestreich	(Czech Republic) MKR Technology
7	R4	(Belgium) Circuit Zolder	September 11–12			(Switzerland) Markus Bösiger	(Czech Republic) MKR Technology
8	R1	(France) Bugatti Circuit	September 18–19	(United Kingdom) Christopher Levett		(United Kingdom) Christopher Levett	(Germany) Truck Sport Lutz Bernau
8	R2	(France) Bugatti Circuit	September 18–19			(Germany) Jochen Hahn	(Germany) Team Hahn Oxxo Racing
8	R3	(France) Bugatti Circuit	September 18–19	(Germany) Markus Oestreich		(Germany) Markus Oestreich	(Czech Republic) MKR Technology
8	R4	(France) Bugatti Circuit	September 18–19			(Germany) Jochen Hahn	(Germany) Team Hahn Oxxo Racing
9	R1	(Spain) Circuito del Jarama	October 2–3	(Germany) Markus Oestreich		(Switzerland) Markus Bösiger	(Czech Republic) MKR Technology
9	R2	(Spain) Circuito del Jarama	October 2–3			(Germany) Jochen Hahn	(Germany) Team Hahn Oxxo Racing
9	R3	(Spain) Circuito del Jarama	October 2–3	(Germany) Markus Oestreich		(Germany) Markus Oestreich	(Czech Republic) MKR Technology
9	R4	(Spain) Circuito del Jarama	October 2–3			(Czech Republic) David Vršecký	(Czech Republic) Buggyra Int. Racing System

== Championship standings ==
=== Drivers' Championship ===
Points were awarded on a 20, 15, 12, 10, 8, 6, 4, 3, 2, 1 basis to the top 10 finishers in races 1 & 3 of each meeting; and on a 10, 9, 8, 7, 6, 5, 4, 3, 2, 1 basis to the top 10 finishers in races 2 & 4 of each meeting. All scores counted towards the championship.

Pl.	Driver	Trucks	Points
1.	Spain Antonio Albacete	MAN	387
2.	Switzerland Markus Bösiger	Renault	335
3.	Germany Jochen Hahn	MAN	318
4.	Germany Markus Oestreich	Renault	293
5.	Czech Republic David Vršecký	Freightliner	226
6.	United Kingdom Christopher Levett	MAN	210
7.	Czech Republic Adam Lacko	MAN	186
8.	Russia Alex Lvov	MAN	135
9.	Germany Uwe Nittel	Freightliner	82
10.	France Anthony Janiec	Renault	81

Position	Driver	Trucks	Points
11	Spain Javier Mariezcurrena	MAN	55
12	Hungary Balázs Szobi	MAN	28
13	Portugal Jose Rodrigues	MAN	15
14	France Jérémy Robineau	MAN	12
15	Russia Michail Konovalov	Freightliner	9
16	Belgium Jean-Pierre Blaise	MAN	7
17	Spain Jose Bermejo	MAN	5
18	Portugal Eduardo Rodrigues	MAN	4
19	Finland Mika Mäkinen	MAN	3
20	Hungary Zoltan Birnbauer	MAN	2

=== Teams Championship ===
Rang	Team	Driver	Trucks	Points
1	Switzerland Germany MKR Technology	Switzerland Markus Bösiger, Germany Markus Oestreich	Renault	712
2	Germany Truck Sport Bernau	Spain Antonio Albacete, United Kingdom Christopher Levett	MAN	685
3	Germany Hungary Team Hahn Oxxo Racing	Germany Jochen Hahn, Hungary Balázs Szobi	MAN	541

== Bibliography ==
- Göttl, Thomas Paul; Brandenburg, Bert (2010). Truck Sport Book 2010: Truck Race & Truck Trial Europameisterschaft (in English and German). Stuttgart: Motorbuch Verlag. ISBN 978-3-613-30654-7.
