= 2009 European Truck Racing Championship =

Seasons
- ← 2008 2010 →

The 2009 FIA European Truck Racing Championship was a multi-event motor racing championship for production based trucks held across Europe. The championship features a mix of professional motor racing teams and privately funded amateur drivers competing in highly modified versions of two-axle tractor units which conform to the technical regulations for the championship. It was the 25th European Truck Racing Championship season and began at Assen on May 10, with the finale at Jarama on October 4 after nine events. The championship was won by David Vršecký, taking his second title in a row.

== Teams and drivers ==
No.	Driver	Team	Manufacturer	Rounds

Race drivers without fixed number, whose number is defined race by race:

No.	Driver	Team	Manufacturer	Rounds

== Calendar and winners ==
Round		Circuit	Date	Pole position	Fastest lap	Winning driver	Winning team
1	R1	(Netherlands) TT Circuit Assen	May 9-10	(Spain) Antonio Albacete		(Spain) Antonio Albacete	(Spain) Equipo Cepsa
1	R2	(Netherlands) TT Circuit Assen	May 9-10			(Czech Republic) David Vršecký	(Czech Republic) Buggyra Int. Racing System
1	R3	(Netherlands) TT Circuit Assen	May 9-10	(Spain) Antonio Albacete		(Spain) Antonio Albacete	(Spain) Equipo Cepsa
1	R4	(Netherlands) TT Circuit Assen	May 9-10			(Germany) Jochen Hahn	(Germany) Team Hahn Oxxo Racing
2	R1	(Italy) Misano World Circuit	May 23-24	(Czech Republic) David Vršecký		(Switzerland) Markus Bösiger	(Czech Republic) Buggyra Int. Racing System
2	R2	(Italy) Misano World Circuit	May 23-24			(Switzerland) Markus Bösiger	(Czech Republic) Buggyra Int. Racing System
2	R3	(Italy) Misano World Circuit	May 23-24	(Germany) Jochen Hahn		(Czech Republic) David Vršecký	(Czech Republic) Buggyra Int. Racing System
2	R4	(Italy) Misano World Circuit	May 23-24			(Spain) Antonio Albacete	(Spain) Equipo Cepsa
3	R1	(Spain) Circuito de Albacete	June 6-7	(Spain) Antonio Albacete		(Spain) Antonio Albacete	(Spain) Equipo Cepsa
3	R2	(Spain) Circuito de Albacete	June 6-7			(Czech Republic) David Vršecký	(Czech Republic) Buggyra Int. Racing System
3	R3	(Spain) Circuito de Albacete	June 6-7	(Germany) Jochen Hahn		(Spain) Antonio Albacete	(Spain) Equipo Cepsa
3	R4	(Spain) Circuito de Albacete	June 6-7			(Germany) Jochen Hahn	(Germany) Team Hahn Oxxo Racing
4	R1	(France) Circuit Paul Armagnac	June 20-21	(Czech Republic) David Vršecký		(Czech Republic) David Vršecký	(Czech Republic) Buggyra Int. Racing System
4	R2	(France) Circuit Paul Armagnac	June 20-21			(Spain) Antonio Albacete	(Spain) Equipo Cepsa
4	R3	(France) Circuit Paul Armagnac	June 20-21	(Germany) Jochen Hahn		(Germany) Jochen Hahn	(Germany) Team Hahn Oxxo Racing
4	R4	(France) Circuit Paul Armagnac	June 20-21			(Spain) Antonio Albacete	(Spain) Equipo Cepsa
5	R1	(Spain) Circuit de Catalunya	July 4-5	(Germany) Jochen Hahn		(Czech Republic) David Vršecký	(Czech Republic) Buggyra Int. Racing System
5	R2	(Spain) Circuit de Catalunya	July 4-5			(Spain) Antonio Albacete	(Spain) Equipo Cepsa
5	R3	(Spain) Circuit de Catalunya	July 4-5	(Spain) Antonio Albacete		(Germany) Jochen Hahn	(Germany) Team Hahn Oxxo Racing
5	R4	(Spain) Circuit de Catalunya	July 4-5			(Czech Republic) David Vršecký	(Czech Republic) Buggyra Int. Racing System
6	R1	(Germany) Nürburgring	July 25-26	(Switzerland) Markus Bösiger		(Switzerland) Markus Bösiger	(Czech Republic) Buggyra Int. Racing System
6	R2	(Germany) Nürburgring	July 25-26			(Czech Republic) David Vršecký	(Czech Republic) Buggyra Int. Racing System
6	R3	(Germany) Nürburgring	July 25-26	(Czech Republic) David Vršecký		(Czech Republic) David Vršecký	(Czech Republic) Buggyra Int. Racing System
6	R4	(Germany) Nürburgring	July 25-26			(Germany) Jochen Hahn	(Germany) Team Hahn Oxxo Racing
7	R1	(Czech Republic) Autodrom Most	August 29-30	(Czech Republic) David Vršecký		(Czech Republic) David Vršecký	(Czech Republic) Buggyra Int. Racing System
7	R2	(Czech Republic) Autodrom Most	August 29-30			(Czech Republic) David Vršecký	(Czech Republic) Buggyra Int. Racing System
7	R3	(Czech Republic) Autodrom Most	August 29-30	(Spain) Antonio Albacete		(Spain) Antonio Albacete	(Spain) Equipo Cepsa
7	R4	(Czech Republic) Autodrom Most	August 29-30			(Czech Republic) David Vršecký	(Czech Republic) Buggyra Int. Racing System
8	R1	(Belgium) Circuit Zolder	September 12-13	(Czech Republic) David Vršecký		(Spain) Antonio Albacete	(Spain) Equipo Cepsa
8	R2	(Belgium) Circuit Zolder	September 12-13			(Czech Republic) David Vršecký	(Czech Republic) Buggyra Int. Racing System
8	R3	(Belgium) Circuit Zolder	September 12-13	(Spain) Antonio Albacete		(Czech Republic) David Vršecký	(Czech Republic) Buggyra Int. Racing System
8	R4	(Belgium) Circuit Zolder	September 12-13			(Germany) Jochen Hahn	(Germany) Team Hahn Oxxo Racing
9	R1	(France) Bugatti Circuit	September 19-20	(Czech Republic) David Vršecký		(Czech Republic) David Vršecký	(Czech Republic) Buggyra Int. Racing System
9	R2	(France) Bugatti Circuit	September 19-20			(Spain) Antonio Albacete	(Spain) Equipo Cepsa
9	R3	(France) Bugatti Circuit	September 19-20	(Spain) Antonio Albacete		(Czech Republic) David Vršecký	(Czech Republic) Buggyra Int. Racing System
9	R4	(France) Bugatti Circuit	September 19-20			(Czech Republic) David Vršecký	(Czech Republic) Buggyra Int. Racing System
10	R1	(Spain) Circuito del Jarama	October 3-4	(Switzerland) Markus Bösiger		(Czech Republic) David Vršecký	(Czech Republic) Buggyra Int. Racing System
10	R2	(Spain) Circuito del Jarama	October 3-4			(Austria) Egon Allgäuer	(Austria) Truck Race Team Allgäuer
10	R3	(Spain) Circuito del Jarama	October 3-4	(Spain) Antonio Albacete		(Spain) Antonio Albacete	(Spain) Equipo Cepsa
10	R4	(Spain) Circuito del Jarama	October 3-4			(Spain) Antonio Albacete	(Spain) Equipo Cepsa

== Championship standings ==
=== Drivers' Championship ===
Each round or racing event consisted of four races. At the races 1 and 3, the points awarded according to the ranking was on a 20, 15, 12, 10, 8, 6, 4, 3, 2, 1 basis to the top 10 finishers – at the races 2 and 4 with reversed grid, the points awarded were 10, 9, 8, 7, 6, 5, 4, 3, 2, 1 (rank 1 - 10) respectively.

Rank	Driver	Truck	Points
1	(Czech Republic) David Vršecký	Freightliner	490
2	(Spain) Antonio Albacete	MAN	467
3	(Germany) Jochen Hahn	MAN	361
4	(Switzerland) Markus Bösiger	Freightliner	295
5	(United Kingdom) Christopher Levett	MAN	253
6	(Austria) Egon Allgäuer	MAN	218
7	(Austria) Markus Altenstrasser	Renault	139
8	(United Kingdom) Stuart Oliver	MAN	119
9	(Czech Republic) Frankie Vojtíšek	Renault	101
10	(Hungary) Balázs Szobi	MAN	94

Rank	Driver	Truck	Points
11	(Russia) Alexander Lvov	MAN	62
12	(France) Anthony Janiec	Renault	47
13	(France) Dominique Lachèze	MAN	29
14	(Spain) Javier Mariezcurrena	MAN	18
15	(Portugal) José Rodrigues	MAN	15
16	(France) Pascal Robineau	MAN	6
17	(Belgium) Jean-Pierre Blaise	MAN	5
18	(France) Dominique Orsini	Mercedes-Benz	1
19	(France) Michel Bassanelli	DAF	0
20	(Spain) José Bermejo	Mercedes-Benz	0

Rank	Driver	Truck	Points
21	(Spain) Antonio Conejero	MAN	0
22	(France) Noel Crozier	MAN	0
23	(France) Yvan Gaillard	Freightliner	0
24	(Spain) Pedro Ignacio García	Iveco	0
25	(France) Philippe Guyot	MAN	0
26	(France) Jennifer Janiec	MAN	0
27	(Sweden) Mikael Johansson	Scania	0
28	(Netherlands) Erwin Kleinnagelvoort	Scania	0
29	(Spain) David Marco Bermejo	MAN	0
30	(Spain) Francisco Navarro	MAN	0

Source of information:

=== Teams' Championship ===
Rank	Team	Drivers	Trucks	Points
1	(Czech Republic) Buggyra Int. Racing System	(Czech Republic) David Vršecký, (Switzerland) Markus Bösiger	Freightliner	887
2	(Germany) (Hungary) Team Hahn Oxxo Racing	(Germany) Jochen Hahn, (Hungary) Balázs Szobi	MAN	634
3	(Czech Republic) Frankie Truck Racing Team	(Austria) Markus Altenstrasser, (Czech Republic) Frankie Vojtíšek	Renault	475
4	(Germany) Team Bird's Bernau	(United Kingdom) Christopher Levett, (France) Dominique Lachèze	MAN	291

Source of information:

== Bibliography ==
- Göttl, Thomas Paul; Brandenburg, Bert (2009). Truck Sport Book 2009: Truck Race & Truck Trial Europameisterschaft (in English and German). Stuttgart: Motorbuch Verlag. ISBN 978-3-613-30634-9.
