= 2018 European Truck Racing Championship =

The 2018 FIA European Truck Racing Championship was a motor-racing championship using highly tuned tractor units. It was the 34th year of the championship. Jochen Hahn took his fifth victory in the championship driving an Iveco.

== Teams and drivers ==
Team	Manufacturer	No.	Drivers	Rounds
(United Kingdom) Anderson Racing	MAN	7	(United Kingdom) Jamie Anderson	1–2, 5–8
(Czech Republic) Buggyra International Racing System	Freightliner	1	(Czech Republic) Adam Lacko	All
(Czech Republic) Buggyra International Racing System	Freightliner	22	(United Kingdom) Oliver Janes	All
(Czech Republic) Czech Truck Racing Team	MAN	91	(Czech Republic) Frankie Vojtíšek	1, 3–5, 7–8
(Germany) Don't Touch Racing	Iveco	11	(Germany) André Kursim	All
(Netherlands) EK Truck Race	Scania	15	(Netherlands) Erwin Kleinnagelvoort	2–8
(Hungary) GFS Motorsport Egyesület	MAN	88	(United Kingdom) Ryan Smith	1–3
(France) Lion Truck Racing	MAN	6	(France) Anthony Janiec	1, 3, 8
(France) Lion Truck Racing	MAN	20	(France) Teo Calvet	3
(United Kingdom) LRS	MAN	12	(United Kingdom) Ray Coleman	1–2, 4, 6–8
(Spain) Orlando Rodríguez-Ruiz	Mercedes-Benz	33	(Spain) Orlando Rodríguez-Ruiz	8
(Spain) Pedro Ignacio García	Iveco	26	(Spain) Pedro Ignacio García	8
(Spain) Pedro Marco Sanchez	MAN	25	(Spain) Pedro Marco Sanchez	8
(Portugal) Reboconort Racing Truck Team	MAN	14	(Portugal) José Rodrigues	3, 5–8
(Portugal) Reboconort Racing Truck Team	MAN	38	(Portugal) Eduardo Rodrigues	1, 3, 7–8
(Portugal) Reboconort Racing Truck Team	MAN	38	(Portugal) José Eduardo Rodrigues	5–6
(Portugal) Reboconort Racing Truck Team	MAN	4	(Portugal) José Eduardo Rodrigues	8
(Germany) Reinert Racing GmbH	MAN	77	(Germany) René Reinert	All
(Germany) SL Trucksport	MAN	30	(Germany) Sascha Lenz	All
(United Kingdom) T-Sport Racing	MAN	37	(United Kingdom) Terry Gibbon	2–3, 5, 7–8
(Germany) Tankpool 24 Racing	Mercedes-Benz	3	(Hungary) Norbert Kiss	All
(Germany) Tankpool 24 Racing	Mercedes-Benz	24	(Germany) Steffen Faas	All
(Netherlands) Team Cees Zandbergen	Scania	45	(Netherlands) Frans Smit	1, 8
(Germany) Team Hahn Racing	Iveco	2	(Germany) Jochen Hahn	All
(France) Team Robineau	MAN	21	(France) Thomas Robineau	1, 3
(Germany) Team Schwabentruck Racing	Iveco	27	(Germany) Gerd Körber	1, 3
(Germany) Team Schwabentruck Racing	Iveco	44	(Germany) Stephanie Halm	All
(United Kingdom) TOR Truck Racing	MAN	17	(United Kingdom) Shane Brereton	All
(Germany) Truck Sport Lutz Bernau	MAN	23	(Spain) Antonio Albacete	All
(Germany) Truck Sport Lutz Bernau	MAN	32	(Spain) Luis Recuenco	All
(Spain) Ultima Vuelta	MAN	66	(Spain) Jose Alberto Vila	8
(Spain) Ultima Vuelta	MAN	68	(Spain) Alejandro Diaz	8
Entries ineligible for points
(United Kingdom) Ryan Smith	MAN	81	(United Kingdom) Ryan Smith	7

== Calendar and winners ==
Round		Circuit	Date	Pole position	Fastest lap	Winning driver	Winning team
1	R1	(Italy) Misano World Circuit	26–27 May	(Germany) Jochen Hahn	(Germany) Jochen Hahn	(Germany) Jochen Hahn	(Germany) Team Hahn Racing
1	R2	(Italy) Misano World Circuit	26–27 May		(Germany) Jochen Hahn	(Germany) Sascha Lenz	(Germany) SL Trucksport
1	R3	(Italy) Misano World Circuit	26–27 May	(Germany) Jochen Hahn	(Germany) Stephanie Halm	(Germany) Jochen Hahn	(Germany) Team Hahn Racing
1	R4	(Italy) Misano World Circuit	26–27 May		(United Kingdom) Ryan Smith	(United Kingdom) Ryan Smith	(Hungary) GFS Motorsport Egyesület
2	R1	(Hungary) Hungaroring	16–17 June	(Czech Republic) Adam Lacko	(Germany) Jochen Hahn	(Germany) Jochen Hahn	(Germany) Team Hahn Racing
2	R2	(Hungary) Hungaroring	16–17 June		(Czech Republic) Adam Lacko	(Czech Republic) Adam Lacko	(Czech Republic) Buggyra International Racing System
2	R3	(Hungary) Hungaroring	16–17 June	(Germany) Jochen Hahn	(Germany) Jochen Hahn	(Germany) Jochen Hahn	(Germany) Team Hahn Racing
2	R4	(Hungary) Hungaroring	16–17 June		(Germany) Sascha Lenz	(Germany) René Reinert	(Germany) Reinert Racing GmbH
3	R1	(Germany) Nürburgring	29 June–1 July	(Spain) Antonio Albacete	(Spain) Antonio Albacete	(Spain) Antonio Albacete	(Germany) Truck Sports Lutz Bernau
3	R2	(Germany) Nürburgring	29 June–1 July		(United Kingdom) Ryan Smith	(Germany) Stephanie Halm	(Germany) Team Schwabentruck Racing
3	R3	(Germany) Nürburgring	29 June–1 July	(Germany) Jochen Hahn	(Germany) René Reinert	(Germany) Jochen Hahn	(Germany) Team Hahn Racing
3	R4	(Germany) Nürburgring	29 June–1 July		(Germany) Sascha Lenz	(France) Anthony Janiec	(France) Lion Truck Racing
4	R1	Slovakia Ring	14–15 July	(Czech Republic) Adam Lacko	(Hungary) Norbert Kiss	(Spain) Antonio Albacete	(Germany) Truck Sports Lutz Bernau
4	R2	Slovakia Ring	14–15 July		(Germany) Stephanie Halm	(United Kingdom) Shane Brereton	(United Kingdom) TOR Truck Racing
4	R3	Slovakia Ring	14–15 July	(Czech Republic) Adam Lacko	(Germany) Jochen Hahn	(Germany) Jochen Hahn	(Germany) Team Hahn Racing
4	R4	Slovakia Ring	14–15 July		(Germany) René Reinert	(Hungary) Norbert Kiss	(Germany) Tankpool 24 Racing
5	R1	(Czech Republic) Autodrom Most	1–2 September	(Spain) Antonio Albacete	(Czech Republic) Adam Lacko	(Czech Republic) Adam Lacko	(Czech Republic) Buggyra International Racing System
5	R2	(Czech Republic) Autodrom Most	1–2 September		(Czech Republic) Adam Lacko	(Czech Republic) Adam Lacko	(Czech Republic) Buggyra International Racing System
5	R3	(Czech Republic) Autodrom Most	1–2 September	(Czech Republic) Adam Lacko	(Germany) Jochen Hahn	(Germany) Jochen Hahn	(Germany) Team Hahn Racing
5	R4	(Czech Republic) Autodrom Most	1–2 September		(Germany) Stephanie Halm	(Germany) René Reinert	(Germany) Reinert Racing GmbH
6	R1	(Belgium) Circuit Zolder	15–16 September	(Spain) Antonio Albacete	(Spain) Antonio Albacete	(Spain) Antonio Albacete	(Germany) Truck Sports Lutz Bernau
6	R2	(Belgium) Circuit Zolder	15–16 September		(Czech Republic) Adam Lacko	(Germany) Stephanie Halm	(Germany) Team Schwabentruck Racing
6	R3	(Belgium) Circuit Zolder	15–16 September	(Germany) Jochen Hahn	(Spain) Antonio Albacete	(Germany) Jochen Hahn	(Germany) Team Hahn Racing
6	R4	(Belgium) Circuit Zolder	15–16 September		(Germany) Jochen Hahn	(Portugal) José Rodrigues	(Portugal) Reboconort Racing Truck Team
7	R1	(France) Bugatti Circuit	29–30 September	(Germany) Sascha Lenz	(Germany) Jochen Hahn	(Germany) Jochen Hahn	(Germany) Team Hahn Racing
7	R2	(France) Bugatti Circuit	29–30 September		(Germany) Jochen Hahn	(Germany) André Kursim	(Germany) Don't Touch Racing
7	R3	(France) Bugatti Circuit	29–30 September	(Germany) Jochen Hahn	(Germany) Jochen Hahn	(Germany) Jochen Hahn	(Germany) Team Hahn Racing
7	R4	(France) Bugatti Circuit	29–30 September		(Germany) Jochen Hahn	(Spain) Antonio Albacete	(Germany) Truck Sports Lutz Bernau
8	R1	(Spain) Circuito del Jarama	6–7 October	(Germany) Jochen Hahn	(Germany) Jochen Hahn	(Germany) Jochen Hahn	(Germany) Team Hahn Racing
8	R2	(Spain) Circuito del Jarama	6–7 October		(Germany) Sascha Lenz	(Germany) René Reinert	(Germany) Reinert Racing GmbH
8	R3	(Spain) Circuito del Jarama	6–7 October	(Germany) Jochen Hahn	(Germany) Jochen Hahn	(Germany) Jochen Hahn	(Germany) Team Hahn Racing
8	R4	(Spain) Circuito del Jarama	6–7 October		(Germany) Jochen Hahn	(Germany) René Reinert	(Germany) Reinert Racing GmbH

== Championship standings ==
=== Drivers' Championship ===
Each round or racing event consisted of four races. At each race, points were awarded to the top ten classified finishers using the following structure:

Position	**1st**	**2nd**	**3rd**	**4th**	**5th**	**6th**	**7th**	**8th**	**9th**	**10th**
Points (races 1 and 3)	20	15	12	10	8	6	4	3	2	1
Points (races 2 and 4)	10	9	8	7	6	5	4	3	2	1

Pos.	Driver	MIS (Italy)				HUN (Hungary)				NUR (Germany)				SVK (Slovakia)				MOS (Czech Republic)				ZOL (Belgium)				LMS (France)				JAR (Spain)				Pts.
1	(Germany) Jochen Hahn	**1**	4	**1**	8	1	6	**1**	17	2	12	**1**	4	2	2	1	4	3	6	1	5	3	2	**1**	3	1	4	**1**	3	**1**	7	**1**	4	387
2	(Czech Republic) Adam Lacko	2	2	9	Ret	**8**	1	3	4	4	3	4	2	**3**	8	**2**	5	1	1	**2**	4	2	17	3	7	5	3	12	8	3	9	3	5	266
3	(Spain) Antonio Albacete	3	10	5	3	9	8	16	6	**1**	6	2	3	1	6	EX	11	**4**	Ret	5	9	**1**	4	2	6	4	5	7	1	2	6	2	6	249
4	(Germany) Sascha Lenz	7	1	7	2	5	4	8	2	9	9	10	5	5	5	5	2	2	7	3	6	6	6	4	4	**2**	6	2	7	4	5	4	8	229
5	(Hungary) Norbert Kiss	DSQ	5	3	4	2	5	4	3	3	4	19	6	4	4	6	1	5	3	4	2	4	8	12	5	3	7	4	10	DNS	Ret	Ret	7	207
6	(Germany) Stephanie Halm	4	8	2	5	3	3	5	9	5	1	Ret	7	15	7	3	6	7	4	10	7	7	1	6	2	7	2	5	4	7	3	7	3	205
7	(Germany) René Reinert	Ret	7	4	7	6	2	7	1	Ret	13	3	10	6	3	7	7	8	2	6	1	5	5	7	Ret	6	Ret	13	9	6	1	5	1	171
8	(Germany) André Kursim	11	DNS	6	6	4	7	6	5	7	5	5	12	7	15	4	3	6	5	9	8	8	3	5	Ret	8	1	3	6	DNS	DNS	9	Ret	146
9	(Portugal) José Rodrigues									6	10	7	17					9	8	7	3	9	7	8	1	9	9	6	5	5	4	6	2	95
10	(United Kingdom) Shane Brereton	DNS	9	11	Ret	7	Ret	14	8	10	11	11	9	8	1	9	9	DNS	12	8	10	10	10	14	15	10	10	9	14	8	2	8	9	58
11	(United Kingdom) Ryan Smith	12	Ret	8	1	16	10	2	7	Ret	8	9	8													EX	8	8	2					41
12	(France) Anthony Janiec	6	3	DNS	DNS					12	7	8	1																	10	10	11	DNS	33
13	(Germany) Gerd Körber	5	Ret	10	9					8	2	6	Ret																					29
14	(Germany) Steffen Faas	10	Ret	15	10	11	9	11	15	13	14	13	EX	11	10	8	8	12	10	11	11	Ret	11	11	8	DSQ	Ret	17	12	9	8	14	11	20
15	(United Kingdom) Oliver Janes	DNS	11	Ret	11	14	11	13	16	20	17	Ret	11	13	13	10	10	10	9	12	15	11	12	9	9	13	11	10	13	11	11	10	13	13
16	(United Kingdom) Jamie Anderson	8	Ret	DSQ	12	13	Ret	9	10									11	13	13	13	14	9	10	10	11	Ret	19	11	DNS	19	15	10	12
17	(France) Thomas Robineau	9	6	12	Ret					11	Ret	12	14																					7
18	(United Kingdom) Ray Coleman	13	13	13	14	10	14	17	12					10	9	12	12					16	13	16	11	EX	15	14	15	14	12	17	14	4
19	(Spain) Luis Recuenco	16	EX	17	13	12	13	15	13	19	16	Ret	18	9	12	Ret	14	16	15	14	12	13	14	13	12	DSQ	13	18	16	DNS	14	13	Ret	2
20	(United Kingdom) Terry Gibbon					17	12	10	11	18	20	14	13					14	Ret	15	17					12	12	11	19	16	16	12	12	2
—	(Netherlands) Erwin Kleinnagelvoort					15	15	12	14	17	18	16	15	12	14	13	15	13	14	16	16	15	16	17	14	14	16	15	18	13	13	18	15	0
—	(France) Teo Calvet									15	15	18	EX																					0
—	(Portugal) Eduardo Rodrigues	14	12	14	15					16	19	17	16													DSQ	14	16	17	12	15	16	16	0
—	(Czech Republic) Frankie Vojtíšek	DNS	WD							14	21	15	DNS	14	11	11	13	15	11	Ret	DSQ					DNS	17	Ret	DNS	DNS	DNS	WD		0
—	(Netherlands) Frans Smit	15	14	16	16																									18	17	19	17	0
—	(Portugal) José Eduardo Rodrigues																	17	16	17	14	12	15	15	13					DNS	DNS	21	18	0
—	(Spain) Pedro Ignacio García																													17	18	20	19	0
—	(Spain) Jose Alberto Vila																													15	Ret	DNS	DNS	0
—	(Spain) Alejandro Diaz																													DNQ		DNQ		0
—	(Spain) Orlando Rodríguez-Ruiz																													DNQ		DNQ		0
—	(Spain) Pedro Marco Sanchez																													DNQ		WD		0
Pos.	Driver	MIS (Italy)				HUN (Hungary)				NUR (Germany)				SVK (Slovakia)				MOS (Czech Republic)				ZOL (Belgium)				LMS (France)				JAR (Spain)				Pts.

Colour	Result
Gold	Winner
Silver	Second place
Bronze	Third place
Green	Points classification
Blue	Non-points classification
Blue	Non-classified finish (NC)
Purple	Retired, not classified (Ret)
Red	Did not qualify (DNQ)
Red	Did not pre-qualify (DNPQ)
Black	Disqualified (DSQ)
White	Did not start (DNS)
White	Withdrew (WD)
White	Race cancelled (C)
Blank	Did not practice (DNP)
Blank	Did not arrive (DNA)
Blank	Excluded (EX)

**Bold** – Pole
Italics – Fastest Lap

== Bibliography ==
- Göttl, Thomas Paul; Trost, Oliver (2018). Truck Sport Book 2018 (in English and German). Stuttgart: Motorbuch Verlag. ISBN 978-3-613-30880-0.
