= 2007 European Truck Racing Championship =

Seasons
- ← 2006 2008 →

The 2007 FIA European Truck Racing Championship was a multi-event motor racing championship for production based trucks held across Europe. The championship features a mix of professional motor racing teams and privately funded amateur drivers competing in highly modified versions of two-axle tractor units which conform to the technical regulations for the championship. It was the 23rd European Truck Racing Championship season and began at Catalunya on April 1, with the finale at Jarama on October 7 after nine events. The championship was won by Markus Bösiger, taking his first title.

== Teams and drivers ==
| No. | Driver | Team | Manufacturer | Rounds |

Race drivers without fixed number, whose number is defined race by race:

| No. | Driver | Team | Manufacturer | Rounds |

== Calendar and winners ==
| Round | | Circuit | Date | Pole position | Fastest lap | Winning driver | Winning team |
|---|---|---|---|---|---|---|---|
| 1 | QR1 | (Spain) Circuit de Catalunya | March 31-April 1 | (Switzerland) Markus Bösiger | | (Switzerland) Markus Bösiger | (Czech Republic) Buggyra Int. Racing System |
| 1 | CR1 | (Spain) Circuit de Catalunya | March 31-April 1 | | | (Switzerland) Markus Bösiger | (Czech Republic) Buggyra Int. Racing System |
| 1 | QR2 | (Spain) Circuit de Catalunya | March 31-April 1 | (Switzerland) Markus Bösiger | | (Switzerland) Markus Bösiger | (Czech Republic) Buggyra Int. Racing System |
| 1 | CR2 | (Spain) Circuit de Catalunya | March 31-April 1 | | | (Czech Republic) David Vršecký | (Czech Republic) Buggyra Int. Racing System |
| 2 | QR1 | (Belgium) Circuit Zolder | May 19-20 | (Switzerland) Markus Bösiger | | (Switzerland) Markus Bösiger | (Czech Republic) Buggyra Int. Racing System |
| 2 | CR1 | (Belgium) Circuit Zolder | May 19-20 | | | (Switzerland) Markus Bösiger | (Czech Republic) Buggyra Int. Racing System |
| 2 | QR2 | (Belgium) Circuit Zolder | May 19-20 | (Switzerland) Markus Bösiger | | (Switzerland) Markus Bösiger | (Czech Republic) Buggyra Int. Racing System |
| 2 | CR2 | (Belgium) Circuit Zolder | May 19-20 | | | (Switzerland) Markus Bösiger | (Czech Republic) Buggyra Int. Racing System |
| 3 | QR1 | (Spain) Circuito de Albacete | June 2-3 | (Spain) Antonio Albacete | | (Spain) Antonio Albacete | (Spain) Equipo Cepsa |
| 3 | CR2 | (Spain) Circuito de Albacete | June 2-3 | | | (Spain) Antonio Albacete | (Spain) Equipo Cepsa |
| 3 | QR2 | (Spain) Circuito de Albacete | June 2-3 | (Germany) Jochen Hahn | | (Switzerland) Markus Bösiger | (Czech Republic) Buggyra Int. Racing System |
| 3 | CR2 | (Spain) Circuito de Albacete | June 2-3 | | | (Czech Republic) David Vršecký | (Czech Republic) Buggyra Int. Racing System |
| 4 | QR1 | (France) Circuit Paul Armagnac | June 23-24 | (Czech Republic) David Vršecký | | (Switzerland) Markus Bösiger | (Czech Republic) Buggyra Int. Racing System |
| 4 | CR1 | (France) Circuit Paul Armagnac | June 23-24 | | | (Switzerland) Markus Bösiger | (Czech Republic) Buggyra Int. Racing System |
| 4 | QR2 | (France) Circuit Paul Armagnac | June 23-24 | (Spain) Antonio Albacete | | (Spain) Antonio Albacete | (Spain) Equipo Cepsa |
| 4 | CR2 | (France) Circuit Paul Armagnac | June 23-24 | | | (Spain) Antonio Albacete | (Spain) Equipo Cepsa |
| 5 | QR1 | (Germany) Nürburgring | July 7-8 | (Switzerland) Markus Bösiger | | (Switzerland) Markus Bösiger | (Czech Republic) Buggyra Int. Racing System |
| 5 | CR1 | (Germany) Nürburgring | July 7-8 | | | (Switzerland) Markus Bösiger | (Czech Republic) Buggyra Int. Racing System |
| 5 | QR2 | (Germany) Nürburgring | July 7-8 | (Switzerland) Markus Bösiger | | (Switzerland) Markus Bösiger | (Czech Republic) Buggyra Int. Racing System |
| 5 | CR2 | (Germany) Nürburgring | July 7-8 | | | (Czech Republic) David Vršecký | (Czech Republic) Buggyra Int. Racing System |
| 6 | QR1 | (Czech Republic) Autodrom Most | August 25-26 | (Spain) Antonio Albacete | | (Czech Republic) David Vršecký | (Czech Republic) Buggyra Int. Racing System |
| 6 | CR1 | (Czech Republic) Autodrom Most | August 25-26 | | | (Spain) Antonio Albacete | (Spain) Equipo Cepsa |
| 6 | QR2 | (Czech Republic) Autodrom Most | August 25-26 | (Spain) Antonio Albacete | | (Germany) Gerd Körber | (Austria) Truck Race Team Allgäuer |
| 6 | CR2 | (Czech Republic) Autodrom Most | August 25-26 | | | (United Kingdom) Chris Levett | (United Kingdom) Team Atkins MAN |
| 7 | QR1 | (France) Bugatti Circuit | September 8-9 | (Spain) Antonio Albacete | | (Spain) Antonio Albacete | (Spain) Equipo Cepsa |
| 7 | CR1 | (France) Bugatti Circuit | September 8-9 | | | (Switzerland) Markus Bösiger | (Czech Republic) Buggyra Int. Racing System |
| 7 | QR2 | (France) Bugatti Circuit | September 8-9 | (Czech Republic) David Vršecký | | (Czech Republic) David Vršecký | (Czech Republic) Buggyra Int. Racing System |
| 7 | CR2 | (France) Bugatti Circuit | September 8-9 | | | (Czech Republic) David Vršecký | (Czech Republic) Buggyra Int. Racing System |
| 8 | QR1 | (Italy) Misano World Circuit | September 22-23 | (Switzerland) Markus Bösiger | | (Switzerland) Markus Bösiger | (Czech Republic) Buggyra Int. Racing System |
| 8 | CR1 | (Italy) Misano World Circuit | September 22-23 | | | (Switzerland) Markus Bösiger | (Czech Republic) Buggyra Int. Racing System |
| 8 | QR2 | (Italy) Misano World Circuit | September 22-23 | (Czech Republic) David Vršecký | | (Spain) Antonio Albacete | (Spain) Equipo Cepsa |
| 8 | CR2 | (Italy) Misano World Circuit | September 22-23 | | | (Czech Republic) David Vršecký | (Czech Republic) Buggyra Int. Racing System |
| 9 | QR1 | (Spain) Circuito del Jarama | October 6-7 | (Czech Republic) David Vršecký | | (Spain) Antonio Albacete | (Spain) Equipo Cepsa |
| 9 | CR1 | (Spain) Circuito del Jarama | October 6-7 | | | (Spain) Antonio Albacete | (Spain) Equipo Cepsa |
| 9 | QR2 | (Spain) Circuito del Jarama | October 6-7 | (Switzerland) Markus Bösiger | | (Germany) Jochen Hahn | (Germany) Team Hahn Racing |
| 9 | CR2 | (Spain) Circuito del Jarama | October 6-7 | | | (Germany) Jochen Hahn | (Germany) Team Hahn Racing |

== Championship standings ==
=== Drivers' Championship ===
Each round or racing event consisted of four races, with two qualifying races and two cup races. For the two qualifying races, the points awarded according to the ranking was on a 10, 9, 8, 7, 6, 5, 4, 3, 2, 1 basis to the top 10 finishers – for the two cup races with the grid decided from the finishing order of the previous qualifying race, the points awarded were 20, 15, 12, 10, 8, 6, 4, 3, 2, 1 (rank 1 - 10) respectively.

| Rank | Driver | Truck | Points |
|---|---|---|---|
| 1 | (Switzerland) Markus Bösiger | Freightliner | 378 |
| 2 | (Spain) Antonio Albacete | MAN | 377 |
| 3 | (Czech Republic) David Vršecký | Freightliner | 321 |
| 4 | (Germany) Jochen Hahn | Mercedes-Benz | 291 |
| 5 | (Germany) Gerd Körber | MAN | 274 |
| 6 | (Austria) Egon Allgäuer | MAN | 168 |
| 7 | (France) Jean-Philippe Belloc | MAN | 149 |
| 8 | (United Kingdom) Chris Levett | MAN | 147 |
| 9 | (United Kingdom) Stuart Oliver | MAN | 84 |
| 10 | (Czech Republic) Frankie Vojtíšek | Renault | 51 |

| Rank | Driver | Truck | Points |
|---|---|---|---|
| 11 | (United Kingdom) Ross Garrett | Renault | 34 |
| 12 | (Austria) Markus Altenstrasser | Renault | 27 |
| 13 | (France) Joseph Adua | MAN | 20 |
| 14 | (Portugal) José Rodrigues | MAN | 16 |
| 15 | (Germany) Markus Östreich | MAN | 14 |
| 16 | (Spain) Simeon Martín | Renault | 13 |
| 17 | (Spain) Javier Mariezcurrena | MAN | 11 |
| 18 | (Germany) Hans-Joachim Stuck | MAN | 9 |
| 19 | (France) Anthony Janiec | Renault | 6 |
| 20 | (United Kingdom) Andy Levett | MAN | 5 |

| Rank | Driver | Truck | Points |
|---|---|---|---|
| 21 | (Spain) Antonio Conejero | Iveco | 2 |
| 22 | (France) Pascal Robineau | MAN | 2 |
| 23 | (Portugal) Eduardo Rodrigues | MAN | 1 |
| 24 | (Spain) Jose Manuel Bailon | Mercedes-Benz | 0 |
| 25 | (France) Michel Bassanelli | DAF | 0 |
| 26 | (Spain) José Bermejo | MAN | 0 |
| 27 | (Sweden) Mikael Johansson | Scania | 0 |
| 28 | (Netherlands) Erwin Kleinnagelvoort | Scania | 0 |
| 29 | (France) Dominique Lachèze | Renault | 0 |
| 30 | (Spain) David Marco Bermejo | MAN | 0 |

Source of information:

=== Teams' Championship ===
| Rank | Team | Drivers | Trucks | Points |
|---|---|---|---|---|
| 1 | (Czech Republic) Buggyra Int. Racing System | (Switzerland) Markus Bösiger, (Czech Republic) David Vršecký | Freightliner | 780 |
| 2 | (Austria) Truck Race Team Allgäuer | (Germany) Gerd Körber, (Austria) Egon Allgäuer | MAN | 582 |
| 3 | (Germany) Team Hahn Racing | (Germany) Jochen Hahn, (Spain) Enrique Sanjuan | Mercedes-Benz | 473 |
| 4 | (Czech Republic) Frankie Truck Racing Team | (Czech Republic) Frankie Vojtíšek, (Spain) Simeon Martín | Renault | 374 |

Source of information:

== Bibliography ==
- Göttl, Thomas Paul (2007). Truck Sport Book 2007 (in English and German). Stuttgart: Motorbuch Verlag. ISBN 978-3-613-30597-7.
