= 2008 European Truck Racing Championship =

Seasons
- ← 2007 2009 →

The 2008 FIA European Truck Racing Championship was a multi-event motor racing championship for production based trucks held across Europe. The championship features a mix of professional motor racing teams and privately funded amateur drivers competing in highly modified versions of two-axle tractor units which conform to the technical regulations for the championship. It was the 24th European Truck Racing Championship season and began at Catalunya on May 11, with the finale at Jarama on October 5 after nine events. The championship was won by David Vršecký, taking his first title and the second in a row for the Buggyra team.

== Teams and drivers ==
No.	Driver	Team	Manufacturer	Rounds

Race drivers without fixed number, whose number is defined race by race:

No.	Driver	Team	Manufacturer	Rounds

== Calendar and winners ==
Round		Circuit	Date	Pole position	Fastest lap	Winning driver	Winning team
1	QR1	(Spain) Circuit de Catalunya	May 10–11	(Switzerland) Markus Bösiger		(Switzerland) Markus Bösiger	(Czech Republic) Buggyra Int. Racing System
1	CR1	(Spain) Circuit de Catalunya	May 10–11			(Czech Republic) Frankie Vojtíšek	(Czech Republic) Frankie Truck Racing Team
1	QR2	(Spain) Circuit de Catalunya	May 10–11	(Czech Republic) David Vršecký		(Czech Republic) David Vršecký	(Czech Republic) Buggyra Int. Racing System
1	CR2	(Spain) Circuit de Catalunya	May 10–11			(Czech Republic) David Vršecký	(Czech Republic) Buggyra Int. Racing System
2	QR1	(Italy) Misano World Circuit	May 24–25	(Czech Republic) David Vršecký		(Spain) Antonio Albacete	(Spain) Equipo Cepsa
2	CR1	(Italy) Misano World Circuit	May 24–25			(Czech Republic) David Vršecký	(Czech Republic) Buggyra Int. Racing System
2	QR2	(Italy) Misano World Circuit	May 24–25	(Switzerland) Markus Bösiger		(Switzerland) Markus Bösiger	(Czech Republic) Buggyra Int. Racing System
2	CR2	(Italy) Misano World Circuit	May 24–25			(Switzerland) Markus Bösiger	(Czech Republic) Buggyra Int. Racing System
3	QR1	(Spain) Circuito de Albacete	June 7–8	(Switzerland) Markus Bösiger		(Switzerland) Markus Bösiger	(Czech Republic) Buggyra Int. Racing System
3	CR1	(Spain) Circuito de Albacete	June 7–8			(Switzerland) Markus Bösiger	(Czech Republic) Buggyra Int. Racing System
3	QR2	(Spain) Circuito de Albacete	June 7–8	(Spain) Antonio Albacete		(Spain) Antonio Albacete	(Spain) Equipo Cepsa
3	CR2	(Spain) Circuito de Albacete	June 7–8			(Spain) Antonio Albacete	(Spain) Equipo Cepsa
4	QR1	(France) Circuit Paul Armagnac	June 28–29	(Czech Republic) David Vršecký		(Czech Republic) David Vršecký	(Czech Republic) Buggyra Int. Racing System
4	CR1	(France) Circuit Paul Armagnac	June 28–29			(Switzerland) Markus Bösiger	(Czech Republic) Buggyra Int. Racing System
4	QR2	(France) Circuit Paul Armagnac	June 28–29	(Spain) Antonio Albacete		(Switzerland) Markus Bösiger	(Czech Republic) Buggyra Int. Racing System
4	CR2	(France) Circuit Paul Armagnac	June 28–29			(Spain) Antonio Albacete	(Spain) Equipo Cepsa
5	QR1	(Germany) Nürburgring	July 12–13	(Switzerland) Markus Bösiger		(Switzerland) Markus Bösiger	(Czech Republic) Buggyra Int. Racing System
5	CR1	(Germany) Nürburgring	July 12–13			(Switzerland) Markus Bösiger	(Czech Republic) Buggyra Int. Racing System
5	QR2	(Germany) Nürburgring	July 12–13	(Switzerland) Markus Bösiger		(Switzerland) Markus Bösiger	(Czech Republic) Buggyra Int. Racing System
5	CR2	(Germany) Nürburgring	July 12–13			(Czech Republic) David Vršecký	(Czech Republic) Buggyra Int. Racing System
6	QR1	(Czech Republic) Autodrom Most	August 30–31	(Czech Republic) David Vršecký		(Czech Republic) David Vršecký	(Czech Republic) Buggyra Int. Racing System
6	CR1	(Czech Republic) Autodrom Most	August 30–31			(Czech Republic) David Vršecký	(Czech Republic) Buggyra Int. Racing System
6	QR2	(Czech Republic) Autodrom Most	August 30–31	(Switzerland) Markus Bösiger		(Switzerland) Markus Bösiger	(Czech Republic) Buggyra Int. Racing System
6	CR2	(Czech Republic) Autodrom Most	August 30–31			(Switzerland) Markus Bösiger	(Czech Republic) Buggyra Int. Racing System
7	QR1	(Belgium) Circuit Zolder	September 13–14	(Switzerland) Markus Bösiger		(Spain) Antonio Albacete	(Spain) Equipo Cepsa
7	CR1	(Belgium) Circuit Zolder	September 13–14			(Spain) Antonio Albacete	(Spain) Equipo Cepsa
7	QR2	(Belgium) Circuit Zolder	September 13–14	(Czech Republic) David Vršecký		(Switzerland) Markus Bösiger	(Czech Republic) Buggyra Int. Racing System
7	CR2	(Belgium) Circuit Zolder	September 13–14			(Czech Republic) David Vršecký	(Czech Republic) Buggyra Int. Racing System
8	QR1	(France) Bugatti Circuit	September 20–21	(Czech Republic) David Vršecký		(Switzerland) Markus Bösiger	(Czech Republic) Buggyra Int. Racing System
8	CR1	(France) Bugatti Circuit	September 20–21			(Switzerland) Markus Bösiger	(Czech Republic) Buggyra Int. Racing System
8	QR2	(France) Bugatti Circuit	September 20–21	(Czech Republic) David Vršecký		(Spain) Antonio Albacete	(Spain) Equipo Cepsa
8	CR2	(France) Bugatti Circuit	September 20–21			(Germany) Jochen Hahn	(Germany) Team Hahn Racing
9	QR1	(Spain) Circuito del Jarama	October 4–5	(Spain) Antonio Albacete		(Spain) Antonio Albacete	(Spain) Equipo Cepsa
9	CR1	(Spain) Circuito del Jarama	October 4–5			(Spain) Antonio Albacete	(Spain) Equipo Cepsa
9	QR2	(Spain) Circuito del Jarama	October 4–5	(Czech Republic) David Vršecký		(Spain) Antonio Albacete	(Spain) Equipo Cepsa
9	CR2	(Spain) Circuito del Jarama	October 4–5			(Spain) Antonio Albacete	(Spain) Equipo Cepsa

== Championship standings ==
=== Drivers' Championship ===
Each round or racing event consisted of four races, with two qualifying races and two cup races. For the two qualifying races, the points awarded according to the ranking was on a 10, 9, 8, 7, 6, 5, 4, 3, 2, 1 basis to the top 10 finishers – for the two cup races with the grid decided from the finishing order of the previous qualifying race, the points awarded were 20, 15, 12, 10, 8, 6, 4, 3, 2, 1 (rank 1 - 10) respectively.

Rank	Driver	Truck	Points
1	(Czech Republic) David Vršecký	Freightliner	414
2	(Switzerland) Markus Bösiger	Freightliner	393
3	(Spain) Antonio Albacete	MAN	372
4	(Germany) Jochen Hahn	MAN	305
5	(France) Jean-Philippe Belloc	MAN	239
6	(Austria) Markus Altenstrasser	Renault	148
7	(United Kingdom) Stuart Oliver	MAN	116
8	(Czech Republic) Frankie Vojtíšek	Renault	101
9	(United Kingdom) Christopher Levett	MAN	98
10	(Austria) Egon Allgäuer	MAN	97

Rank	Driver	Truck	Points
11	(France) Dominique Lachèze	MAN	65
12	(France) Anthony Janiec	Renault	38
13	(Belgium) Jean-Pierre Blaise	MAN	19
14	(Spain) Javier Mariezcurrena	MAN	16
15	(Hungary) Balázs Szobi	MAN	12
16	(Russia) Mikhail Konovalov	MAN	6
17	(United Kingdom) Steve Horne	Mercedes-Benz	4
18	(France) Pascal Robineau	MAN	4
19	(France) Franck Conti	Volvo	1
20	(France) Michel Bassanelli	DAF	0

Rank	Driver	Truck	Points
21	(Spain) David Marco Bermejo	MAN	0
22	(Spain) José Bermejo	Mercedes-Benz	0
23	(Spain) Antonio Conejero	Iveco	0
24	(Spain) Pedro Ignacio García	Volvo	0
25	(France) Jennifer Janiec	Renault	0
26	(Sweden) Mikael Johansson	Scania	0
27	(Netherlands) Erwin Kleinnagelvoort	Scania	0
28	(Spain) Francisco Navarro	Renault	0
29	(France) Dominique Orsini	Mercedes-Benz	0
30	(France) David Patalacci	DAF	0

Source of information:

=== Teams' Championship ===
Rank	Team	Drivers	Trucks	Points
1	(Czech Republic) Buggyra Int. Racing System	(Czech Republic) David Vršecký, (Switzerland) Markus Bösiger	Freightliner	878
2	(Germany) Koller und Schwemmer Team	(Germany) Jochen Hahn, (France) Jean-Philippe Belloc	MAN	644
3	(Czech Republic) Frankie Truck Racing Team	(Austria) Markus Altenstrasser, (Czech Republic) Frankie Vojtíšek	Renault	459
4	(United Kingdom) (Spain) Team Bermejo/Horne	(United Kingdom) Steve Horne, (Spain) José Bermejo	Mercedes-Benz	244

Source of information:

== Bibliography ==
- Göttl, Thomas Paul; Brandenburg, Bert (2008). Truck Sport Book 2008: Truck Race & Truck Trial Europameisterschaft (in English and German). Stuttgart: Motorbuch Verlag. ISBN 978-3-613-30613-4.
