= 2017 European Truck Racing Championship =

The 2017 FIA European Truck Racing Championship was a motor-racing championship using highly tuned tractor units. It was the 33rd year of the championship. Adam Lacko won the championship with Freightliner.

== Teams and drivers ==
Team	Manufacturer	No.	Drivers	Rounds
(Czech Republic) Buggyra International Racing System	Freightliner	33	(Slovenia) Alen Draganović	1
(Czech Republic) Buggyra International Racing System	Freightliner	33	(Slovenia) Enes Draganović	2
(Czech Republic) Buggyra International Racing System	Freightliner	33	(Czech Republic) David Vršecký	3-9
(Czech Republic) Buggyra International Racing System	Freightliner	55	(Czech Republic) Adam Lacko	All
(Czech Republic) Czech Truck Racing Team	MAN	91	(Czech Republic) Frankie Vojtíšek	4-6, 9
(Spain) David Bermejo	MAN	25	(Spain) David Bermejo	9
(Netherlands) EK Truck Race	Scania	15	(Netherlands) Erwin Kleinnagelvoort	1, 3-9
(Netherlands) EK Truck Race	DAF	51	(Netherlands) Henry Tijhuis	3, 7
(Germany) Heinz-Werner Lenz	Mercedes-Benz	36	(Germany) Heinz-Werner Lenz	3
(France) Lion Truck Racing	MAN	6	(France) Anthony Janiec	3
(Hungary) OXXO Energy Racing	MAN	88	(United Kingdom) Ryan Smith	1, 5-6
(Spain) Pedro Ignacio García	Iveco	26	(Spain) Pedro Ignacio García	9
(Portugal) Reboconorte Racing Truck Team	MAN	11	(Portugal) Eduardo Rodrigues	1-6, 9
(Portugal) Reboconorte Racing Truck Team	MAN	14	(Portugal) José Rodrigues	All
(Portugal) Reboconorte Racing Truck Team	MAN	38	(Portugal) José Eduardo Rodrigues	7-9
(Germany) Reinert Racing GmBH	MAN	44	(Germany) Stephanie Halm	All
(Germany) S.L Truck Racing Team	MAN	30	(Germany) Sascha Lenz	All
(United Kingdom) T-Sport Racing	MAN	37	(United Kingdom) Terry Gibbon	1
(Czech Republic) Team 14	Renault	76	(Poland) Grzegorz Ostaszewski	6
(Netherlands) Team Cees Zandbergen	Scania	45	(Netherlands) Cees Zandbergen	3, 8
(Germany) Team Hahn Racing	Iveco	1	(Germany) Jochen Hahn	All
(France) Team Luxo Sport	Volvo	94	(France) Manu Rodrigues	3, 6, 8
(United Kingdom) Team Oliver Racing	MAN	17	(United Kingdom) Shane Brereton	5-6, 8
(France) Team Orsini Racing	Mercedes-Benz	19	(France) Dominique Orsini	2, 4-7
(France) Team Robineau	MAN	21	(France) Thomas Robineau	2, 7
(France) Team Robineau	MAN	21	(France) Jeremy Robineau	3
(Germany) Team Schwaben-Truck	Iveco	27	(Germany) Gerd Körber	All
(Germany) Team Schwaben-Truck	Iveco	28	(Austria) Markus Altenstrasser	1
(Germany) Team Schwaben-Truck	Iveco	28	(Germany) Steffen Faas	3-4
(Germany) Team Tankpool 24 Racing	Mercedes-Benz	24	(Hungary) Norbert Kiss	All
(Germany) Team Tankpool 24 Racing	Mercedes-Benz	42	(Germany) André Kursim	All
(Germany) Truck Sport Lutz Bernau	MAN	23	(Spain) Antonio Albacete	All
(Portugal) Vitry Truck Racing	Renault	22	(Portugal) José-Manuel de Sousa	3, 7
(Portugal) Vitry Truck Racing	Renault	99	(Portugal) José Teodosio	3, 7
(Spain) Ultima Vuelta	Mercedes-Benz	13	(Spain) Orlando Rodríguez-Ruiz	9
(Spain) Ultima Vuelta	Mercedes-Benz	35	(Spain) Enrique Alberto Vila	9
(Spain) Ultima Vuelta	Mercedes-Benz	66	(Spain) Jose Alberto Vila	9
Entries ineligible for points
(United Kingdom) Team Digraph Racing	MAN	69	(United Kingdom) David Jenkins	8

== Calendar and winners ==
Round		Circuit	Date	Pole position	Fastest lap	Winning driver	Winning team
1	R1	(Austria) Red Bull Ring	12–14 May	(Germany) Jochen Hahn	(Germany) Stephanie Halm	(Germany) Jochen Hahn	(Germany) Team Hahn Racing
1	R2	(Austria) Red Bull Ring	12–14 May		(Germany) Jochen Hahn	(Portugal) José Rodrigues	(Portugal) Reboconorte Racing Truck Team
1	R3	(Austria) Red Bull Ring	12–14 May	(Germany) Stephanie Halm	(Germany) Jochen Hahn	(Germany) Stephanie Halm	(Germany) Reinert Racing GmBH
1	R4	(Austria) Red Bull Ring	12–14 May		(Germany) Jochen Hahn	(Germany) Jochen Hahn	(Germany) Team Hahn Racing
2	R1	(Italy) Misano World Circuit	26–28 May	(Czech Republic) Adam Lacko	(Czech Republic) Adam Lacko	(Czech Republic) Adam Lacko	(Czech Republic) Buggyra International Racing System
2	R2	(Italy) Misano World Circuit	26–28 May		(Czech Republic) Adam Lacko	(Germany) Jochen Hahn	(Germany) Team Hahn Racing
2	R3	(Italy) Misano World Circuit	26–28 May	(Czech Republic) Adam Lacko	(Czech Republic) Adam Lacko	(Czech Republic) Adam Lacko	(Czech Republic) Buggyra International Racing System
2	R4	(Italy) Misano World Circuit	26–28 May		(Hungary) Norbert Kiss	(Czech Republic) Adam Lacko	(Czech Republic) Buggyra International Racing System
3	R1	(Germany) Nürburgring	30 June–2 July	(Germany) Jochen Hahn	(Czech Republic) Adam Lacko	(Czech Republic) Adam Lacko	(Czech Republic) Buggyra International Racing System
3	R2	(Germany) Nürburgring	30 June–2 July		(Czech Republic) Adam Lacko	(Czech Republic) Adam Lacko	(Czech Republic) Buggyra International Racing System
3	R3	(Germany) Nürburgring	30 June–2 July	(Hungary) Norbert Kiss	(Czech Republic) Adam Lacko	(Czech Republic) Adam Lacko	(Czech Republic) Buggyra International Racing System
3	R4	(Germany) Nürburgring	30 June–2 July		Race cancelled (Note: Race cancelled due to unsafe track conditions)		
4	R1	Slovakia Ring	14–16 July	(Hungary) Norbert Kiss	(Hungary) Norbert Kiss	(Hungary) Norbert Kiss	(Germany) Team Tankpool 24 Racing
4	R2	Slovakia Ring	14–16 July		(Hungary) Norbert Kiss	(Spain) Antonio Albacete	(Germany) Truck Sport Lutz Bernau
4	R3	Slovakia Ring	14–16 July	(Germany) Jochen Hahn	(Hungary) Norbert Kiss	(Hungary) Norbert Kiss	(Germany) Team Tankpool 24 Racing
4	R4	Slovakia Ring	14–16 July		(Hungary) Norbert Kiss	(Germany) Stephanie Halm	(Germany) Reinert Racing GmBH
5	R1	(Hungary) Hungaroring	25–27 August	(Hungary) Norbert Kiss	(Hungary) Norbert Kiss	(Hungary) Norbert Kiss	(Germany) Team Tankpool 24 Racing
5	R2	(Hungary) Hungaroring	25–27 August		(Germany) Jochen Hahn	(Czech Republic) Adam Lacko	(Czech Republic) Buggyra International Racing System
5	R3	(Hungary) Hungaroring	25–27 August	(Hungary) Norbert Kiss	(Hungary) Norbert Kiss	(Czech Republic) Adam Lacko	(Czech Republic) Buggyra International Racing System
5	R4	(Hungary) Hungaroring	25–27 August		(Czech Republic) Adam Lacko	(Czech Republic) Adam Lacko	(Czech Republic) Buggyra International Racing System
6	R1	(Czech Republic) Autodrom Most	1–3 September	(Germany) Jochen Hahn	(Czech Republic) Adam Lacko	(Germany) Jochen Hahn	(Germany) Team Hahn Racing
6	R2	(Czech Republic) Autodrom Most	1–3 September		(Germany) Stephanie Halm	(United Kingdom) Ryan Smith	(Hungary) OXXO Energy Racing
6	R3	(Czech Republic) Autodrom Most	1–3 September	(Czech Republic) Adam Lacko	(Czech Republic) Adam Lacko	(Czech Republic) Adam Lacko	(Czech Republic) Buggyra International Racing System
6	R4	(Czech Republic) Autodrom Most	1–3 September		(United Kingdom) Ryan Smith	(United Kingdom) Shane Brereton	(United Kingdom) Team Oliver Racing
7	R1	(Belgium) Circuit Zolder	15–17 September	(Czech Republic) Adam Lacko	(Hungary) Norbert Kiss	(Hungary) Norbert Kiss	(Germany) Team Tankpool 24 Racing
7	R2	(Belgium) Circuit Zolder	15–17 September		(Spain) Antonio Albacete	(Germany) André Kursim	(Germany) Team Tankpool 24 Racing
7	R3	(Belgium) Circuit Zolder	15–17 September	(Czech Republic) Adam Lacko	(Czech Republic) Adam Lacko	(Czech Republic) Adam Lacko	(Czech Republic) Buggyra International Racing System
7	R4	(Belgium) Circuit Zolder	15–17 September		(Germany) André Kursim	(Germany) André Kursim	(Germany) Team Tankpool 24 Racing
8	R1	(France) Bugatti Circuit	22–24 September	(Germany) Stephanie Halm	(Germany) Stephanie Halm	(Germany) Stephanie Halm	(Germany) Reinert Racing GmBH
8	R2	(France) Bugatti Circuit	22–24 September		(Germany) Sascha Lenz	(Hungary) Norbert Kiss	(Germany) Team Tankpool 24 Racing
8	R3	(France) Bugatti Circuit	22–24 September	(Germany) Sascha Lenz	(Germany) Sascha Lenz	(Czech Republic) Adam Lacko	(Czech Republic) Buggyra International Racing System
8	R4	(France) Bugatti Circuit	22–24 September		(Germany) Sascha Lenz	(Germany) Gerd Körber	(Germany) Team Schwaben-Truck
9	R1	(Spain) Circuito del Jarama	6–8 October	(Spain) Antonio Albacete	(Spain) Antonio Albacete	(Spain) Antonio Albacete	(Germany) Truck Sport Lutz Bernau
9	R2	(Spain) Circuito del Jarama	6–8 October		(Germany) Jochen Hahn	(Czech Republic) David Vršecký	(Czech Republic) Buggyra International Racing System
9	R3	(Spain) Circuito del Jarama	6–8 October	(Hungary) Norbert Kiss	(Hungary) Norbert Kiss	(Hungary) Norbert Kiss	(Germany) Team Tankpool 24 Racing
9	R4	(Spain) Circuito del Jarama	6–8 October		(Germany) Jochen Hahn	(Spain) Antonio Albacete	(Germany) Truck Sport Lutz Bernau

== Championship standings ==
=== Drivers' Championship ===
Each round or racing event consisted of four races. At each race, points were awarded to the top ten classified finishers using the following structure:

Position	**1st**	**2nd**	**3rd**	**4th**	**5th**	**6th**	**7th**	**8th**	**9th**	**10th**
Points (races 1 and 3)	20	15	12	10	8	6	4	3	2	1
Points (races 2 and 4)	10	9	8	7	6	5	4	3	2	1

Pos.	Driver	RBR (Austria)				MIS (Italy)				NUR (Germany)				SVK (Slovakia)				HUN (Hungary)				MOS (Czech Republic)				ZOL (Belgium)				LMS (France)				JAR (Spain)				Pts.
1	(Czech Republic) Adam Lacko	4	4	5	2	**1**	3	**1**	1	1	1	1	C	2	3	4	4	4	1	1	1	2	4	**1**	7	**Ret**	5	**1**	4	7	8	1	4	2	6	3	7	381
2	(Germany) Jochen Hahn	**1**	5	2	1	5	1	8	DNS	**3**	4	7	C	3	4	**3**	2	2	2	5	4	**1**	7	2	6	2	4	2	8	2	4	3	3	3	4	2	2	343
3	(Hungary) Norbert Kiss	6	2	10	Ret	2	9	2	3	2	9	**2**	C	**1**	8	1	3	**1**	Ret	**2**	Ret	3	17†	5	4	1	2	5	3	3	1	4	5	16†	5	**1**	6	315
4	(Germany) Stephanie Halm	2	6	**1**	Ret	3	2	4	2	7	5	6	C	4	2	5	1	3	5	3	2	4	2	4	3	16†	7	4	6	**1**	6	5	2	5	8	4	4	298
5	(Spain) Antonio Albacete	10	7	3	4	4	4	3	4	4	Ret	9	C	5	1	2	7	11	6	4	9	5	6	3	5	4	3	3	5	6	2	9	9	**1**	2	8	1	255
6	(Germany) Sascha Lenz	5	8	6	3	6	6	5	9	5	6	12	C	10	7	7	5	5	10	7	6	7	3	6	8	3	6	6	7	5	11	**2**	11	7	7	6	5	184
7	(Germany) Gerd Körber	3	3	11	5	7	5	6	6	8	3	8	C	8	5	8	6	7	8	8	15†	10	8	Ret	9	8	9	10	9	8	3	7	1	6	3	7	3	153
8	(Czech Republic) David Vršecký									12	15	5	C	6	6	6	8	8	4	9	3	6	5	7	2	5	10	7	2	4	5	6	6	4	1	5	Ret	150
9	(Germany) André Kursim	12	10	7	Ret	9	8	11	7	10	7	4	C	7	13†	Ret	9	9	9	10	8	DNS	DNS	DNS	DNS	6	1	8	1	10	10	8	7	9	9	10	9	88
10	(Portugal) José Rodrigues	7	1	4	Ret	8	7	Ret	8	9	12	10	C	12	Ret	9	10	13	Ret	11	11	12	9	9	11	7	8	9	10	9	7	11	12	8	10	9	8	70
11	(United Kingdom) Ryan Smith	9	14†	8	Ret													6	3	Ret	5	8	1	Ret	10													39
12	(United Kingdom) Shane Brereton																	10	7	6	7	9	10	8	1					11	9	12	10					35
13	(France) Anthony Janiec									6	2	3	C																									27
14	(France) Thomas Robineau					10	10	7	5																	9	11	11	DNS									14
15	(Germany) Steffen Faas									11	8	13	C	9	9	10	Ret																					8
16	(Slovenia) Alen Draganović	14	13	9	6																																	7
17	(Austria) Markus Altenstrasser	8	9	Ret	DNS																																	5
18	(United Kingdom) Terry Gibbon	15	Ret	12	7																																	4
19	(Netherlands) Erwin Kleinnagelvoort	13	11	14	8					16	13	17	C	13	11	12	12	15	11	Ret	10	14	12	11	13	11	13	12	12	13	13	Ret	13	DNS	DNS	11	11	4
20	(Portugal) Eduardo Rodrigues	11	12	13	9	11	11	10	10	18	17	18	C	14	12	13	14	14	DSQ	12	13	15	14	13	14									12	13	13	14	4
21	(Czech Republic) Frankie Vojtíšek													11	10	11	11	12	13†	14†	12	11	11	10	15									Ret	11	Ret	10	3
22	(Slovenia) Enes Draganović					DNS	Ret	9	11																													2
23	(Portugal) José Teodosio									13	14	14	C													10	12	Ret	11									1
24	(France) Jeremy Robineau									15	10	11	C																									1
25	(Portugal) José Eduardo Rodrigues																									14	15	Ret	13	14	14	13	14	10	12	12	12	1
26	(Spain) Pedro Ignacio García																																	11	Ret	14	13	0
27	(Germany) Heinz-Werner Lenz									14	11	15	C																									0
28	(France) Dominique Orsini					12	12	12	Ret					Ret	DNS	14	13	16	12	13	14	16	15	14	DNS	13	16†	DNS	DNS									0
29	(Poland) Grzegorz Ostaszewski																					13	13	12	12													0
30	(Portugal) José-Manuel de Sousa									DNS	Ret	19	C													12	14	13	14									0
31	(Spain) Jose Alberto Vila																																	13	15	Ret	16	0
32	(Netherlands) Cees Zandbergen									17	16	16	C																	15	15	14	15					0
33	(Spain) Enrique Alberto Vila																																	14	16	15	17	0
34	(Spain) David Bermejo																																	Ret	14	16†	15	0
35	(Netherlands) Henry Tijhuis									20	DNS	21	C													15	Ret	14	Ret									0
36	(France) Manu Rodrigues									19	18	20	C									DNS	16	15	Ret					16	16	15	16					0
37	(Spain) Orlando Rodríguez-Ruiz																																	15	17†	Ret	DNS	0
Drivers ineligible to score points
	(United Kingdom) David Jenkins																													12	12	10	8					
Pos.	Driver	RBR (Austria)				MIS (Italy)				NUR (Germany)				SVK (Slovakia)				HUN (Hungary)				MOS (Czech Republic)				ZOL (Belgium)				LMS (France)				JAR (Spain)				Pts.

Colour	Result
Gold	Winner
Silver	Second place
Bronze	Third place
Green	Points classification
Blue	Non-points classification
Blue	Non-classified finish (NC)
Purple	Retired, not classified (Ret)
Red	Did not qualify (DNQ)
Red	Did not pre-qualify (DNPQ)
Black	Disqualified (DSQ)
White	Did not start (DNS)
White	Withdrew (WD)
White	Race cancelled (C)
Blank	Did not practice (DNP)
Blank	Did not arrive (DNA)
Blank	Excluded (EX)

**Bold** – Pole
Italics – Fastest Lap

† – Drivers did not finish the race, but were classified as they completed over 75% of the race distance.

== Bibliography ==
- Göttl, Thomas Paul (2017). Truck Sport Book 2017 (in English and German). Stuttgart: Motorbuch Verlag. ISBN 978-3-613-30852-7.
