= Antonio Albacete =

Spanish racing driver (born 1965)

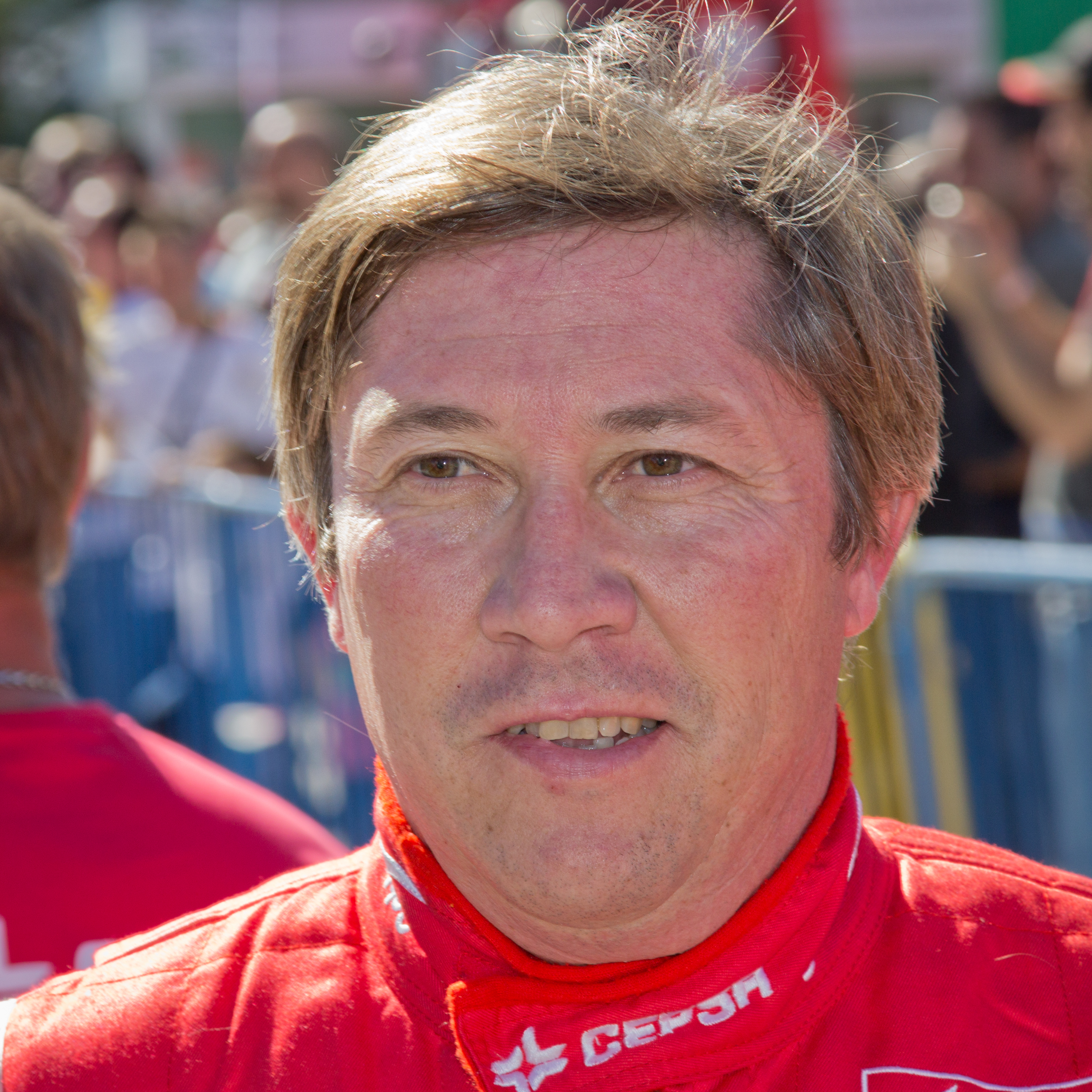
- Albacete at the 2013 European Truck Championship in Jarama Circuit
- Nationality: Spanish
- Born: 15 January 1965 (age 61) Madrid

Previous series
- 1998–2013 1994–1996 1987: European Truck Championship; Spanish Touring Cars; International Formula 3000

Championship titles
- 2005–2006, 2010: European Truck Championship

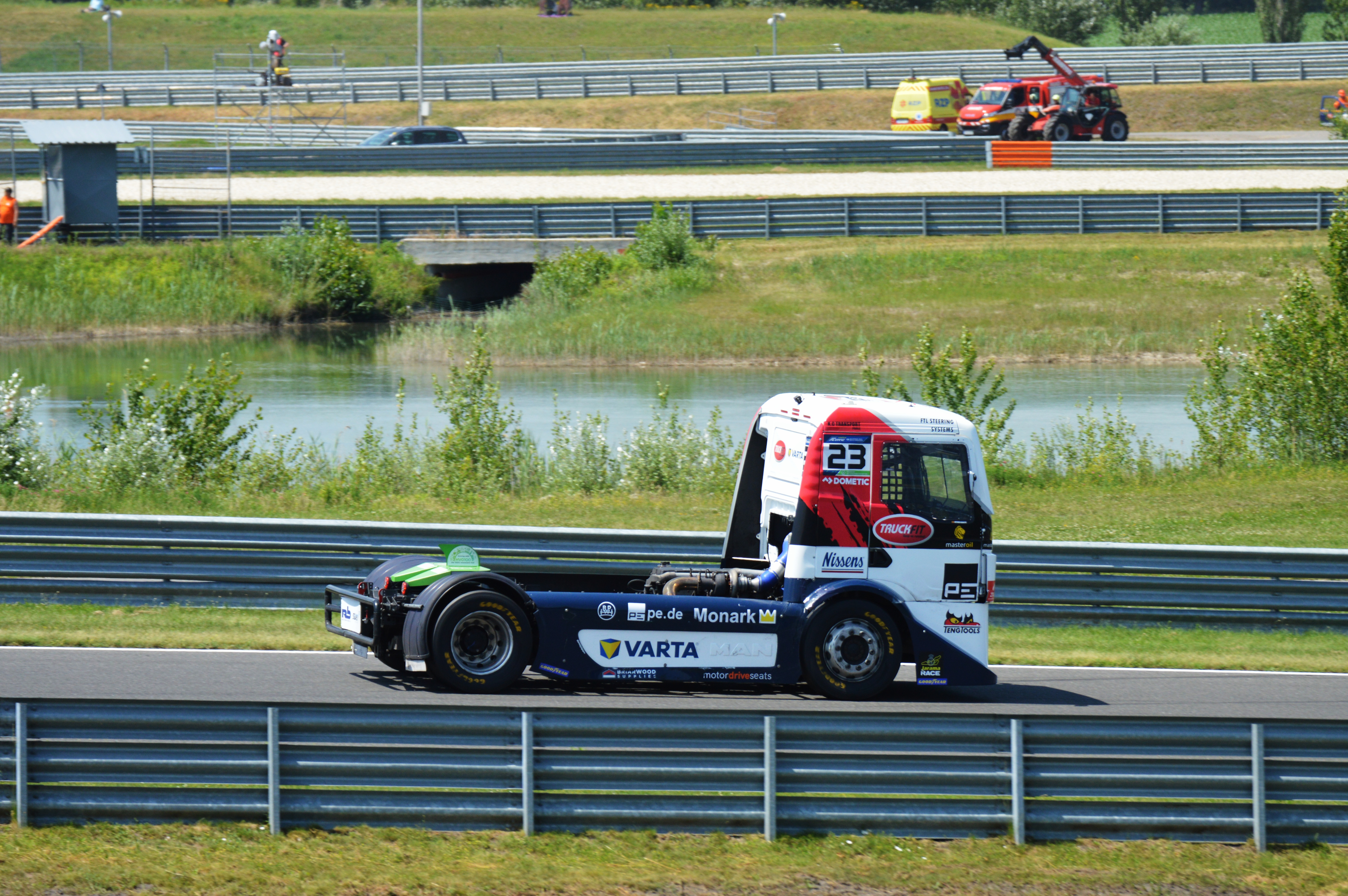
Albacete with a MAN at the 2024 FIA ETRC Truck Race of Slovakia.

Antonio Albacete Martínez (born 15 January 1965) is a Spanish racing driver. He competed in Formula 3000 in 1987 and spent three years in Spanish Touring Cars, from 1994 until 1996. During his stay in the latter, he drove for three different manufacturers – Opel, then BMW, and finally Alfa Romeo. In 1998, he drove for the first time in the European Truck Championship. In 2005, 2006 and 2010, he won the European Truck Championship for the CEPSA-MAN team managed by Spanish Ivan Cruz.

== Racing record ==
FIA European Truck Racing

- 2003: 4th
- 2004: 4th
- 2005: (gold) Champion
- 2006: (gold) Champion
- 2007: (silver) 2nd
- 2008: (bronze) 3rd
- 2009: (silver) 2nd
- 2010: (gold) Champion
- 2011: (silver) 2nd
- 2012: (silver) 2nd
- 2013: (silver) 2nd
- 2014: (bronze) 3rd
- 2015: 5th
- 2017: 5th
- 2018: (bronze) 3rd
- 2019: (silver) 2nd
- 2021: 5th
- 2022: 5th
- 2023: 4th

=== Complete International Formula 3000 results ===
(key) (Races in bold indicate pole position) (Races in italics indicate fastest lap)

Year	Entrant	Chassis	Engine	Tyres	1	2	3	4	5	6	7	8	9	10	11	DC	Points
1987	GA Motorsports	Lola T87/50	Ford Cosworth	A	SIL	VAL	SPA	PAU	DON	PER	BRH	BIR	IMO	BUG	JAR; DNQ	NC	0

=== Complete Spanish Touring Car Championship results ===
(key) (Races in bold indicate pole position; races in italics indicate fastest lap.)

Year	Team	Car	1	2	3	4	5	6	7	8	9	10	11	12	13	14	15	16	17	18	19	20	DC	pts
1993	Central Hispano BMW	BMW M3	ALB; 3	BAR; 5	JER; 1	JAR; 16	BAR; 3	BAR; 2	ALC; 2	ALB; 10	BAR; 5	JAR; 2	JER; 4										2nd	109
1994	Central Hispano Opel	Opel Vectra GT	JAR; 4	ALB; 4	CAL; Ret	ALB; 2	BAR; 4	JER; 4	BAR; 6	ALC; 3	JAR; Ret	JER; 3											4th	93
1995	Teo Martin Motorsport	BMW 318iS	JER; 1; 1	JER; 2; 1	JAR; 1 DSQ	JAR; 2; 3	BAR; 1; 5	BAR; 2; 4	EST; 1 EX	EST; 2 EX	ALB; 1 Ret	ALB; 2 Ret	CAL; 1; 4	CAL; 2; 2	ALB; 1; 8	ALB; 2; 2	JER; 1; 3	JER; 2; 1	BAR; 1; 8	BAR; 2 Ret	JAR; 1; 1	JAR; 2; 1	4th	193
1996	Meycom	Alfa Romeo 155 TS	JAR; 1; 9	JAR; 2; 9	ALB; 1; 7	ALB; 2; 7	BAR; 1 Ret	BAR; 2; 8	EST; 1	EST; 2	CAL; 1	CAL; 2	JER; 1; 10	JER; 2; 8	JAR; 1	JAR; 2	BAR; 1 Ret	BAR; 2 Ret					12th	19
