= Adam Lacko =

Czech racing driver

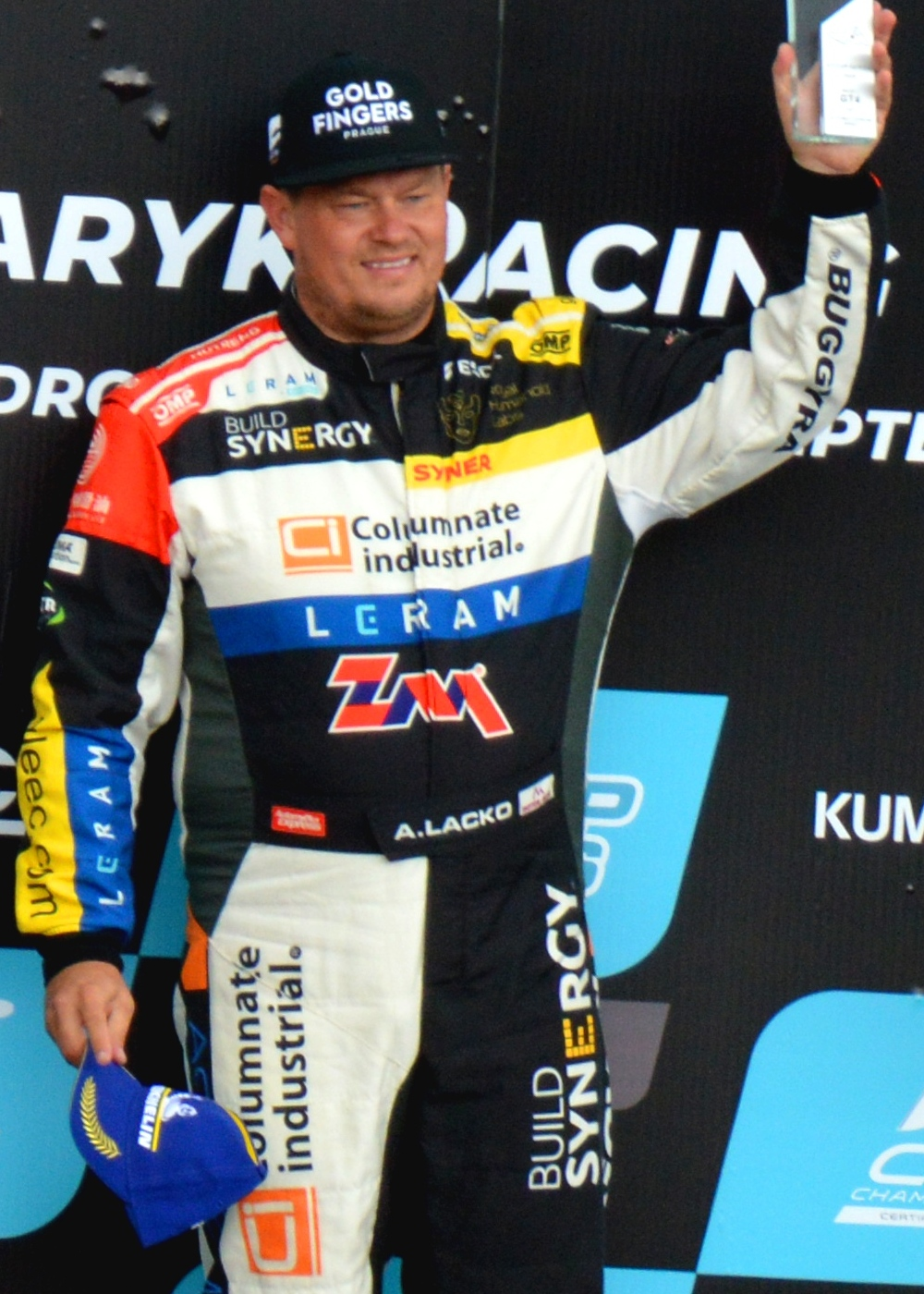
- Lacko at the Brno Circuit in 2025
- Nationality: (Czech Republic) Czech
- Born: 24 September 1984 (age 42) Čeladná, Czechoslovakia
- Categorisation: FIA Silver

Championship titles
- 2017: FIA European Truck Racing Championship

Adam Lacko (born 24 September 1984) is a Czech auto racing driver.

== Career ==
Lacko began his career in 1994 in karting. In 2000, he began competing in the Skoda Octavia Cup, in which he finished runner-up in 2002.

Lacko made the switch to truck racing in 2003, competing in the FIA European Truck Racing Championship, finishing fifth in the standings. He improved to finish third in 2004.

In 2005, Lacko made selected appearances in the World Touring Car Championship with IEP Team, and the FIA GT Championship. He began competing in the Porsche Carrera Cup Germany in 2006. He competed in ADAC GT Masters and FIA GT3 European Championship in 2008.

In 2009, Lacko competed in the FIA GT Championship with K plus K Motorsport.

Since 2011, Lacko has competed full time in the FIA European Truck Racing Championship. Lacko has seen a high level of success in the series, taking numerous race wins and winning the 2017 championship.

== Racing record ==
=== Complete World Touring Car Championship results ===
(key) (Races in bold indicate pole position) (Races in italics indicate fastest lap)

Year	Team	Car	1	2	3	4	5	6	7	8	9	10	11	12	13	14	15	16	17	18	19	20	DC	Points
2005	IEP Team	Alfa Romeo 156 Gta	ITA; 1; 25	ITA; 2; 12																			NC	0
2005	IEP Team	BMW 320i			FRA; 1 Ret	FRA; 2 DNS	GBR; 1	GBR; 2	SMR; 1	SMR; 2	MEX; 1	MEX; 2	BEL; 1; 20	BEL; 2; 13	GER; 1	GER; 2	TUR; 1	TUR; 2	ESP; 1	ESP; 2	MAC; 1	MAC; 2	NC	0
