= Moeve =

Spanish multinational oil and gas company

Moeve, S.A.

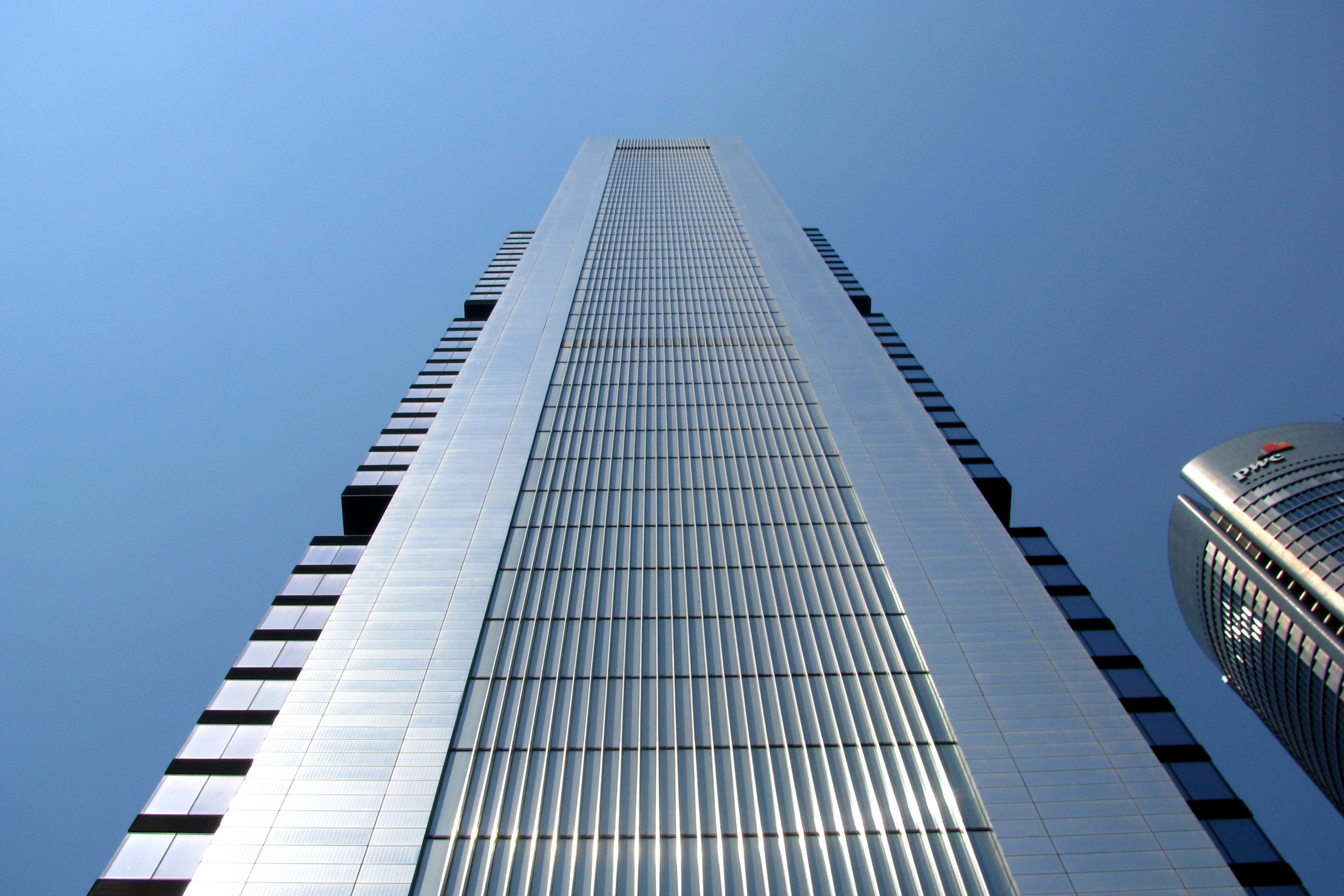
- Torre Moeve in Madrid, Spain, the company's headquarters
- Type: Sociedad Anónima Unipersonal
- Industry: Electrical energy Petroleum
- Founded: September 26, 1929; 97 years ago in Madrid, Spain
- Headquarters: Torre Cepsa; Paseo de la Castellana 259, Cuatro Torres Business Area, Madrid, Spain
- Area served: Worldwide
- Key people: Musabbeh Ali Alkaabi, Chair; Maarten Wetselaar, CEO
- Products: Hydrogen; Petroleum; Natural gas Motor fuels Aviation fuels
- Services: Service stations
- Revenue: ▲€24.868 billion (2024)
- Operating income: ▲€1.852 billion (2024)
- Net income: ▲€92 million (2024)
- Total assets: ▲€12.20 billion (2024)
- Total equity: ▲€3.13 billion (2024)
- Owners: Mubadala Investment Company (61.36%); The Carlyle Group (38.41%)
- Number of employees: ▲11,000 (2024)
- Website: www.moeveglobal.com

Moeve, S.A., known until October 2024 as Cepsa, (Compañía Española de Petróleos, Sociedad Anónima, "Spanish petroleum company, S.A.") is a Spanish multinational integrated energy and petroleum company headquartered at Torre Moeve in the Cuatro Torres Business Area in Madrid.

As of 2024, Moeve produced approximately 34,400 barrels per day (5,470 m^{3}/d), reflecting its strategic shift after divesting upstream assets in Abu Dhabi in 2023. The company operates three refineries with a combined refining capacity of approximately 21.5 million tonnes per year.

As of 31 December 2024, the company’s share capital is primarily held by Cepsa Holding, LLC (61.36%), controlled by Mubadala Investment Company, a sovereign wealth fund of the government of Abu Dhabi, and Matador Bidco S.À.R.L. (38.41%), controlled by The Carlyle Group.

Moeve, which rebranded from Cepsa in October 2024, is undergoing a strategic shift toward low-carbon energy, focusing on green hydrogen, biofuels, and electric mobility, supported by an €8 billion investment plan.

== History ==
Former logo as Cepsa.

Cepsa was founded in 1929 as a private company led by Francisco Recasens, with its first refinery located at Tenerife in the Canary Islands. Because of the Campsa state monopoly of fuel distribution, Cepsa sold its production to that company. It expanded to lubricant production in 1950 and petrochemical products in 1955. In 1964 it opened a factory in Portugal, and in 1967 it added a second refinery at San Roque de Cádiz. After relaxations of the state monopoly, Cepsa bought a portion of Campsa petrol stations in 1992.

In 1988, Abu Dhabi's International Petroleum Investment Company (IPIC) bought a 10% stake of Cepsa. Later Elf Aquitaine bought a 20% stake, and Cepsa became a publicly traded company in 1989. Cepsa bought a third refinery in Huelva in 1991, and entered the liquefied petroleum gas market in 1998. The company expanded to the United Kingdom, Netherlands, Canada, Algeria, Brazil, Colombia and Peru. In 2011 IPIC bought the full company for 267 million euros.

In November 2013, the firm agreed to buy Coastal Energy Co for around $2.21 billion.

The American private equity firm The Carlyle Group completed the acquisition of a 38.1% stake in Cepsa from Mubadala on 8 April 2019.

On October 30, 2024, Cepsa officially changed its name to Moeve, a measure destined to reflect its orientation towards sustainable strategies and low-emitting energy projects.

In 2024 Moeve reported a net profit of €92 million, reversing a €233 million loss in 2023, driven by gains in its energy and chemicals divisions despite a 30% drop in refining margins. The company is shifting its focus to low-carbon energy backed by an €8 billion investment plan that includes a €1.2 billion biofuels plant. Moeve has divested 70% of its oil production assets since 2022 and aims to become a key player in the green hydrogen industry with a 2-gigawatt target by 2030.

== Refineries ==
Cepsa operates 3 refineries in Spain, with 50% ownership of a fourth. Cepsa operates the largest refinery in Iberia, the Gibraltar-San Roque Refinery, which has received significant international criticism for ongoing air pollution problems and increased cancer rates nearby. Cepsa also operates the Refinería de Santa Cruz de Tenerife, La Rábida Refinery, and a 50% split refinery with ASESA.

== Sponsorship ==
Cepsa has sponsored the Spanish football club Recreativo de Huelva between 1997 and 2007, Spain national football team since 2007 and since 2011 has been one of the major sponsors of the Toro Rosso Formula One racing team until 2015 but not directly supplying fuels and lubricants.

As Moeve, the company became title sponsor of Liga F, the highest level of women's club football in Spain. Under the sponsorship the league is known as Liga F Moeve.
