= Anthony Janiec =

French racing driver (1984–2022)

- Born: 17 August 1984; Friauville, France
- Died: 31 July 2022 (aged 37); Albi, France

Anthony Janiec (17 August 1984 in Friauville – 31 July 2022 in Albi) was a French Formula 3 and truck racing driver.

== Biography ==
=== Early life ===
Anthony Janiec was born Friauville in Lorraine. He is the son of stuntman and truck driver Jean-Pierre Janiec and the brother of driver Jennifer Janiec.

=== Career ===
Janiec began his career in the early 2000s and won two French Formula 3 titles in 2004 and 2008.

In 2006, Janiec won two titles of French Champion and one title of Vice-Champion of Europe.

Janiec was a member of the Lion Cup Racing team with which he won three French Truck Racing Championships in 2017, 2018 and 2019. In particular, he would finish on the podium at the European Truck Championship at the Nürburgring in 2017 and first in 2018.

Janiec appears in a video of the Vilebrequin duo devoted to truck racing where he is seen driving his MAN tractor nicknamed "MAN N°66".

=== Death ===
Janiec died on 31 July 2022 in Albi, in the Tarn, of a cardiac arrest.

Janiec was found in the middle of the night by the gendarmes and the emergency services in front of the house of a neighbor in the commune of the Séquestre. He was lying on the ground and half unconscious after trying to break into the house. Transported to the hospital in Albi, he died a few hours later. An investigation was opened to determine the exact circumstances of the tragedy.

The religious funeral is celebrated on Saturday, 6 August 2022, at 2:30 pm, in the church of Friauville, his native village, followed by burial at the communal cemetery.

=== Family ===
Janiec had a partner and two children.
