= 2026 European Truck Racing Championship =

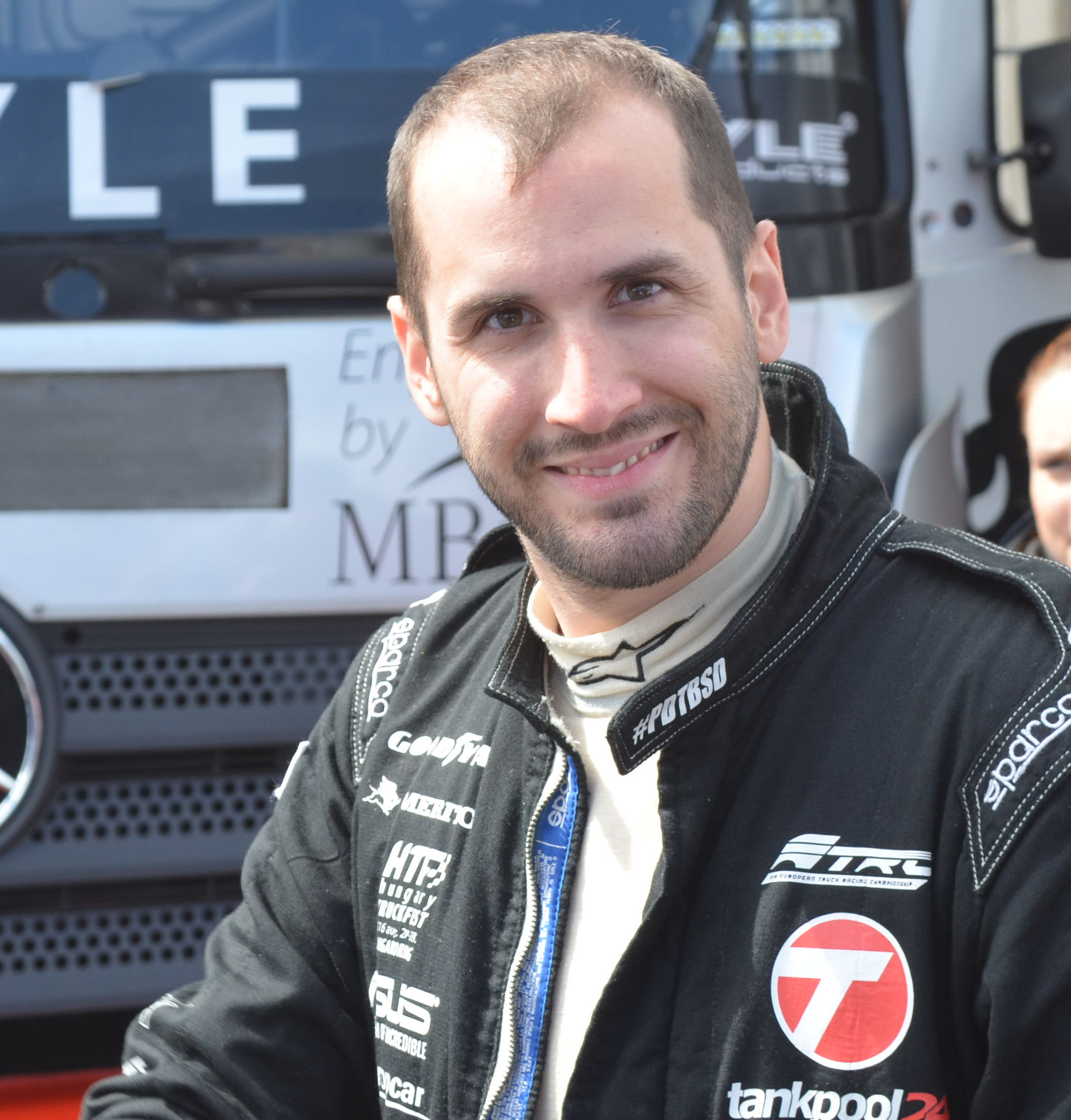
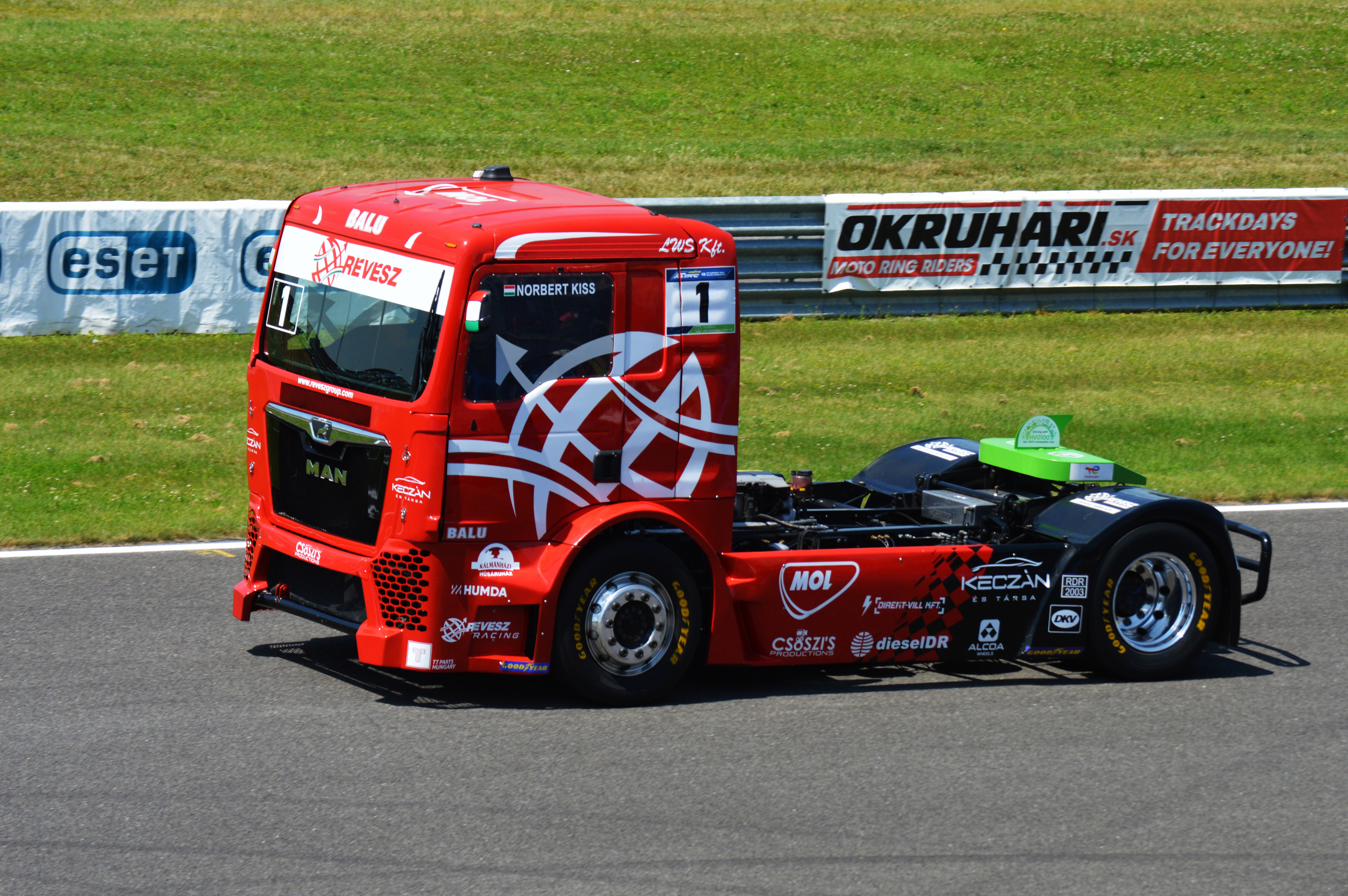
Norbert Kiss and his team Révész Racing won the 2026 Drivers' and Teams' Championship, respectively.

The 2026 European Truck Racing Championship, also known as the Goodyear European Truck Racing Championship for sponsorship reasons, was a motor-racing championship using highly tuned tractor units. It was the 42nd year of the championship. It was a seven-round season, beginning on 30 May at the Misano World Circuit Marco Simoncelli and ending on 4 October at the Circuito del Jarama.

== Schedule ==
Round		Circuit	Date
1	R1	(Italy) Misano World Circuit Marco Simoncelli, Misano Adriatico	30 May
1	R2	(Italy) Misano World Circuit Marco Simoncelli, Misano Adriatico	30 May
1	R3	(Italy) Misano World Circuit Marco Simoncelli, Misano Adriatico	31 May
1	R4	(Italy) Misano World Circuit Marco Simoncelli, Misano Adriatico	31 May
2	R1	Slovakia Ring, Orechová Potôň	6 June
2	R2	Slovakia Ring, Orechová Potôň	6 June
2	R3	Slovakia Ring, Orechová Potôň	7 June
2	R4	Slovakia Ring, Orechová Potôň	7 June
3	R1	(Germany) Nürburgring, Nürburg	11 July
3	R2	(Germany) Nürburgring, Nürburg	11 July
3	R3	(Germany) Nürburgring, Nürburg	12 July
3	R4	(Germany) Nürburgring, Nürburg	12 July
4	R1	(Czech Republic) Autodrom Most, Most	29 August
4	R2	(Czech Republic) Autodrom Most, Most	29 August
4	R3	(Czech Republic) Autodrom Most, Most	30 August
4	R4	(Czech Republic) Autodrom Most, Most	30 August
5	R1	(Belgium) Circuit Zolder, Heusden-Zolder	12 September
5	R2	(Belgium) Circuit Zolder, Heusden-Zolder	12 September
5	R3	(Belgium) Circuit Zolder, Heusden-Zolder	13 September
5	R4	(Belgium) Circuit Zolder, Heusden-Zolder	13 September
6	R1	(France) Bugatti Circuit, Le Mans	26 September
6	R2	(France) Bugatti Circuit, Le Mans	26 September
6	R3	(France) Bugatti Circuit, Le Mans	27 September
6	R4	(France) Bugatti Circuit, Le Mans	27 September
7	R1	(Spain) Circuito del Jarama, San Sebastián de los Reyes	3 October
7	R2	(Spain) Circuito del Jarama, San Sebastián de los Reyes	3 October
7	R3	(Spain) Circuito del Jarama, San Sebastián de los Reyes	4 October
7	R4	(Spain) Circuito del Jarama, San Sebastián de los Reyes	4 October

== Teams and drivers ==
The full season entry list was released on 6 May. Race-by-race entries will be announced throughout the season.

The following table lists all teams and drivers competing in the 2026 championship.

Team	Manufacturer	No.	Drivers	Rounds	Class
(Hungary) Révész Racing	MAN	1	(Hungary) Norbert Kiss	All	
(United Kingdom) NWT Motorsport	MAN	18	(United Kingdom) John Newell	All	C
(Germany) T Sport Bernau	MAN	23	(Spain) Antonio Albacete	All	
(Germany) Ruppert Motorsport	MAN	29	(Germany) Christian Ruppert	4	C
(Germany) SL 30 Trucksport	MAN	30	(Germany) Sascha Lenz	All	
(Germany) Kursch Kurtscheid Racing	MAN	33	(Germany) Stefan Kursch	1, 3, 5	C
(Portugal) Reboconort Racing Truck Team	MAN	38	(Portugal) José Eduardo Rodrigues	All	
(United Kingdom) Garrett Trucksport	MAN	42	(United Kingdom) Luke Garrett	All	C
(United Kingdom) Smith Truck Racing	MAN	46	(United Kingdom) Bradley Smith	1–4, 6–7	C
(France) Lion Truck Racing	MAN	66	(France) Jonathan André	1, 3, 5, 7	C
(Germany) Reinert Racing	MAN	77	(Germany) René Reinert	All	
(United Kingdom) Taylors Trucksport Racing	MAN	81	(United Kingdom) Mark Taylor	All	C
(Germany) Team Hahn Racing	Iveco	2	(Germany) Jochen Hahn	All	
(Germany) Team Hahn Racing	Iveco	22	(Germany) Lukas Hahn	1, 3–4, 7	C
(Germany) Team Schwabentruck	Iveco	28	(Finland) Emma Mäkinen	3–4	C
(Germany) Team Schwabentruck	Iveco	28	(Finland) Mika Mäkinen	7	
(Germany) Team Schwabentruck	Iveco	44	(Germany) Stephanie Halm	All	
(Czech Republic) Buggyra ZM Racing	Iveco	55	(Czech Republic) Adam Lacko	3–4	
(Germany) Tankpool 24 Racing	Freightliner	24	(Germany) Steffen Faas	All	C
(Germany) Hecker Racing	Scania	25	(Germany) Heinrich Clemens-Hecker	1–3, 5–7	C
(Spain) GPS Sport	Mercedes	64	(Spain) Luis Recuenco	2–7	C

Icon	Class
C	Chrome Class

== Results and standings ==
=== Season summary ===
Round		Circuit	Pole position	Fastest lap	Winning driver	Winning team	CHROME winner
1	R1	(Italy) Misano	(Hungary) Norbert Kiss	(Hungary) Norbert Kiss	(Hungary) Norbert Kiss	(Hungary) Révész Racing	(Germany) Lukas Hahn
1	R2	(Italy) Misano		(Hungary) Norbert Kiss	(Hungary) Norbert Kiss	(Hungary) Révész Racing	(Germany) Stefan Kursch
1	R3	(Italy) Misano	(Hungary) Norbert Kiss	(Germany) Jochen Hahn	(Germany) Jochen Hahn	(Germany) Team Hahn Racing	(Germany) Lukas Hahn
1	R4	(Italy) Misano		(Hungary) Norbert Kiss	(Hungary) Norbert Kiss	(Hungary) Révész Racing	(Germany) Lukas Hahn
2	R1	Slovakia Ring	(Hungary) Norbert Kiss	(Hungary) Norbert Kiss	(Hungary) Norbert Kiss	(Hungary) Révész Racing	(United Kingdom) Mark Taylor
2	R2	Slovakia Ring		(Hungary) Norbert Kiss	(Hungary) Norbert Kiss	(Hungary) Révész Racing	(United Kingdom) Mark Taylor
2	R3	Slovakia Ring	(Hungary) Norbert Kiss	(Hungary) Norbert Kiss	(Hungary) Norbert Kiss	(Hungary) Révész Racing	(United Kingdom) Bradley Smith
2	R4	Slovakia Ring		(Hungary) Norbert Kiss	(Hungary) Norbert Kiss	(Hungary) Révész Racing	(United Kingdom) Mark Taylor
3	R1	(Germany) Nürburgring	(Hungary) Norbert Kiss	(Hungary) Norbert Kiss	(Hungary) Norbert Kiss	(Hungary) Révész Racing	(United Kingdom) Mark Taylor
3	R2	(Germany) Nürburgring		(Hungary) Norbert Kiss	(Germany) René Reinert	(Germany) Reinert Racing	(United Kingdom) Bradley Smith
3	R3	(Germany) Nürburgring	(Hungary) Norbert Kiss	(Hungary) Norbert Kiss	(Hungary) Norbert Kiss	(Hungary) Révész Racing	(United Kingdom) Mark Taylor
3	R4	(Germany) Nürburgring		(Hungary) Norbert Kiss	(Hungary) Norbert Kiss	(Hungary) Révész Racing	(United Kingdom) Mark Taylor
4	R1	(Czech Republic) Most	(Hungary) Norbert Kiss	(Hungary) Norbert Kiss	(Hungary) Norbert Kiss	(Hungary) Révész Racing	(United Kingdom) John Newell
4	R2	(Czech Republic) Most		(Hungary) Norbert Kiss	(Germany) Lukas Hahn	(Germany) Team Hahn Racing	(Germany) Lukas Hahn
4	R3	(Czech Republic) Most	(Hungary) Norbert Kiss	(Hungary) Norbert Kiss	(Hungary) Norbert Kiss	(Hungary) Révész Racing	(United Kingdom) Mark Taylor
4	R4	(Czech Republic) Most		(Hungary) Norbert Kiss	(Germany) Stephanie Halm	(Germany) Team Schwabentruck	(United Kingdom) Mark Taylor
5	R1	(Belgium) Zolder	(Hungary) Norbert Kiss	(Hungary) Norbert Kiss	(Hungary) Norbert Kiss	(Hungary) Révész Racing	(United Kingdom) John Newell
5	R2	(Belgium) Zolder		(Germany) Sascha Lenz	(Germany) Sascha Lenz	(Germany) SL 30 Trucksport	(United Kingdom) John Newell
5	R3	(Belgium) Zolder	(Hungary) Norbert Kiss	(Portugal) José Eduardo Rodrigues	(Hungary) Norbert Kiss	(Hungary) Révész Racing	(Germany) Steffen Faas
5	R4	(Belgium) Zolder		(Hungary) Norbert Kiss	(Hungary) Norbert Kiss	(Hungary) Révész Racing	(Germany) Steffen Faas
6	R1	(France) Le Mans	(Hungary) Norbert Kiss	(Hungary) Norbert Kiss	(Hungary) Norbert Kiss	(Hungary) Révész Racing	(United Kingdom) Bradley Smith
6	R2	(France) Le Mans		(Hungary) Norbert Kiss	(Portugal) José Eduardo Rodrigues	(Portugal) Reboconort Racing Truck Team	(United Kingdom) John Newell
6	R3	(France) Le Mans	(Hungary) Norbert Kiss	(Hungary) Norbert Kiss	(Hungary) Norbert Kiss	(Hungary) Révész Racing	(United Kingdom) John Newell
6	R4	(France) Le Mans		(Hungary) Norbert Kiss	(Hungary) Norbert Kiss	(Hungary) Révész Racing	(United Kingdom) Bradley Smith
7	R1	(Spain) Jarama	(Hungary) Norbert Kiss	(Hungary) Norbert Kiss	(Hungary) Norbert Kiss	(Hungary) Révész Racing	(Germany) Lukas Hahn
7	R2	(Spain) Jarama		(Hungary) Norbert Kiss	(United Kingdom) Bradley Smith	(United Kingdom) Smith Truck Racing	(United Kingdom) Bradley Smith
7	R3	(Spain) Jarama	(Hungary) Norbert Kiss	(Hungary) Norbert Kiss	(Hungary) Norbert Kiss	(Hungary) Révész Racing	(Germany) Lukas Hahn
7	R4	(Spain) Jarama		(Hungary) Norbert Kiss	(Germany) Stephanie Halm	(Germany) Team Schwabentruck	(Germany) Lukas Hahn

=== Drivers standings ===
At each race, points are awarded to the top ten classified finishers using the following structure:

Position	**1st**	**2nd**	**3rd**	**4th**	**5th**	**6th**	**7th**	**8th**	**9th**	**10th**
Points (races 1 and 3)	20	15	12	10	8	6	4	3	2	1
Points (races 2 and 4)	10	9	8	7	6	5	4	3	2	1

=== Overall Standings ===
Pos.	Driver	MIS (Italy)				SVK (Slovakia)				NUR (Germany)				MOS (Czech Republic)				ZOL (Belgium)				LMS (France)				JAR (Spain)				Pts.
Pos.	Driver	R1	R2	R3	R4	R1	R2	R3	R4	R1	R2	R3	R4	R1	R2	R3	R4	R1	R2	R3	R4	R1	R2	R3	R4	R1	R2	R3	R4	Pts.
1	(Hungary) Norbert Kiss	**1**	1	**6**	1	**1**	1	**1**	1	**1**	4	**1**	1	**1**	3	**1**	2	**1**	4	**1**	1	**1**	4	**1**	1	**1**	6	**1**	7	383
3	(Germany) Jochen Hahn	4	4	1	6	2	Ret	Ret	DNS	3	6	2	16	5	2	3	5	3	3	7	3	2	2	2	4	2	5	2	5	244
2	(Germany) Sascha Lenz	3	5	4	2	3	9	2	7	4	5	4	6	3	4	4	4	7	1	3	2	4	3	3	5	3	4	4	4	244
4	(Spain) Antonio Albacete	8	2	3	5	6	4	3	4	2	7	3	3	12	13	2	16	2	6	2	5	5	5	4	3	5	3	3	6	222
5	(Portugal) José Eduardo Rodrigues	5	3	9	8	4	6	DNS	DNS	6	2	6	Ret	2	8	9	8	4	13	4	8	8	1	5	10	7	2	6	2	153
6	(Germany) Stephanie Halm	14	6	5	4	7	3	4	3	5	3	Ret	8	Ret	9	8	1	9	7	8	4	3	7	9	8	4	8	7	1	148
7	(Germany) René Reinert	11	7	7	3	8	2	7	5	7	1	12	7	6	6	15	10	8	2	5	7	6	6	6	6	10	9	8	14	120
8	(United Kingdom) Mark Taylor	12	10	15	9	5	5	6	2	8	DSQ	5	2	10	10	5	6	6	8	9	9	13	9	10	9	11	10	11	10	87
9	(United Kingdom) John Newell	9	9	10	10	9	8	10	8	9	9	9	4	4	7	6	7	5	5	11	10	10	8	7	7	9	11	10	8	85
10	(Germany) Lukas Hahn	2	Ret	2	7					Ret	10	10	5	8	1	10	9									6	7	5	3	84
11	(United Kingdom) Bradley Smith	15	DSQ	8	13	14	DNS	5	Ret	10	8	7	11	9	11	13	13					7	11	8	2	8	1	9	12	52
13	(Germany) Steffen Faas	7	Ret	11	11	10	7	12	10	13	11	14	10	Ret	14	11	11	Ret	12	6	6	9	13	11	12	DNS	DNS	14	9	26
12	(Czech Republic) Adam Lacko									Ret	12	8	12	7	5	7	3													25
14	(United Kingdom) Luke Garrett	13	Ret	13	14	13	10	8	6	14	DSQ	13	13	15	12	12	12	11	9	14	12	11	12	12	Ret	13	14	15	13	11
15	(Germany) Stefan Kursch	6	8	14	12					16	16	17	18					13	10	12	13									10
16	(Spain) Luis Recuenco					11	11	9	9	11	13	16	9	11	DNS	17	Ret	12	11	13	14	12	10	13	13	Ret	13	13	11	7
17	(France) Jonathan André	10	12	12	Ret					12	14	11	17					10	Ret	10	11					12	12	12	15	3
18	(Germany) Heinrich Clemens-Hecker	DSQ	11	DNS	Ret	12	12	11	11	Ret	Ret	Ret	15					Ret	DNS	DNS	DNS	14	DNS	Ret	11	Ret	Ret	16	Ret	0
19	(Finland) Emma Mäkinen									15	15	15	14	13	15	14	14													0
20	(Germany) Christian Ruppert													14	16	16	15													0
21	(Finland) Mika Mäkinen																									14	15	DNS	16	0
Pos.	Driver	R1	R2	R3	R4	R1	R2	R3	R4	R1	R2	R3	R4	R1	R2	R3	R4	R1	R2	R3	R4	R1	R2	R3	R4	R1	R2	R3	R4	Pts.
Pos.	Driver	MIS (Italy)				SVK (Slovakia)				NUR (Germany)				MOS (Czech Republic)				ZOL (Belgium)				LMS (France)				JAR (Spain)				Pts.

Colour	Result
Gold	Winner
Silver	Second place
Bronze	Third place
Green	Points classification
Blue	Non-points classification
Blue	Non-classified finish (NC)
Purple	Retired, not classified (Ret)
Red	Did not qualify (DNQ)
Red	Did not pre-qualify (DNPQ)
Black	Disqualified (DSQ)
White	Did not start (DNS)
White	Withdrew (WD)
White	Race cancelled (C)
Blank	Did not practice (DNP)
Blank	Did not arrive (DNA)
Blank	Excluded (EX)

**Bold** – Pole
Italics – Fastest Lap
