= 2024 European Truck Racing Championship =

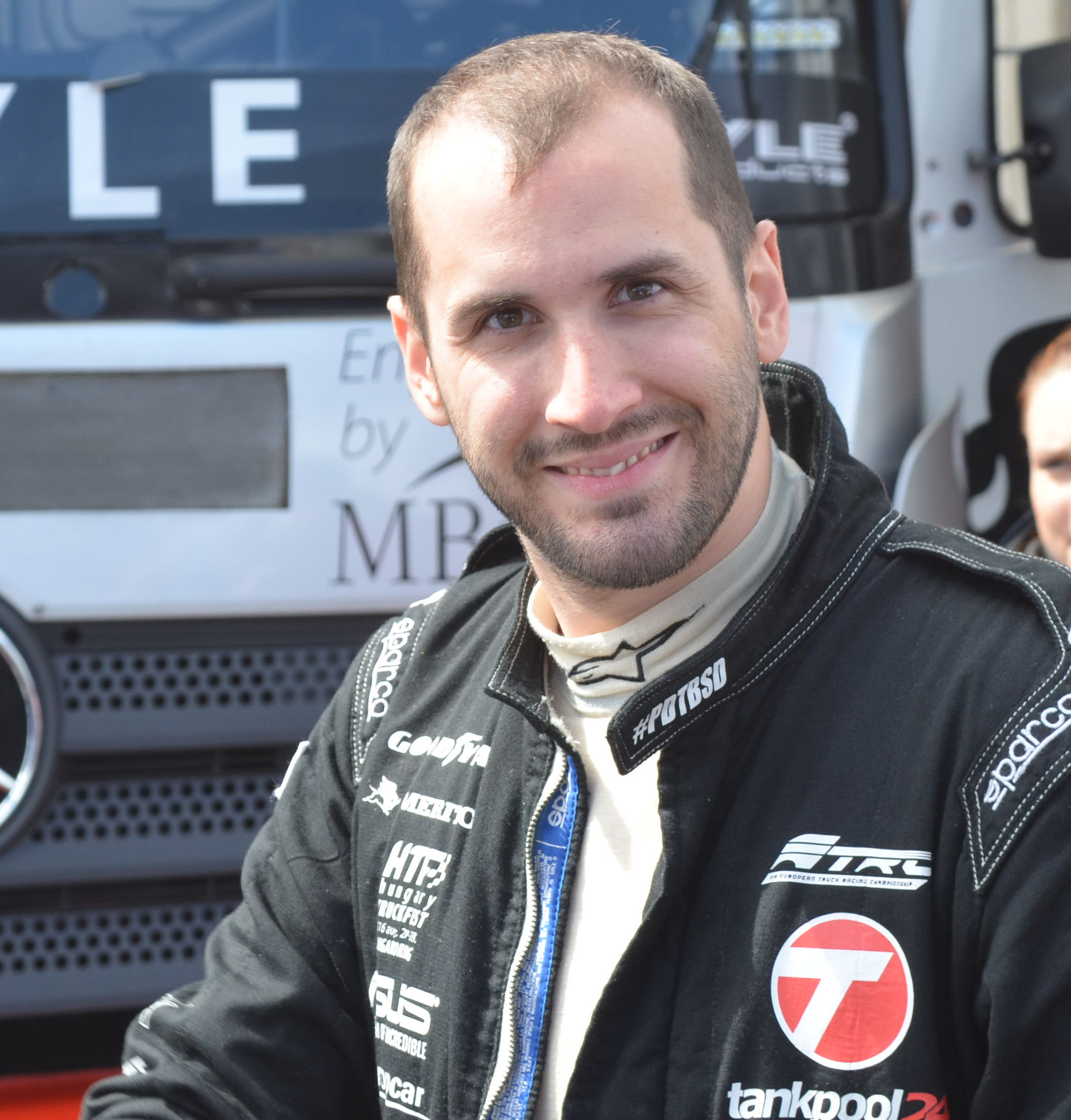
The defending champions and the current Drivers' and Teams' Championship leaders are Norbert Kiss and his team Révész Racing - MAN, respectively.

The 2024 European Truck Racing Championship, also known as the Goodyear European Truck Racing Championship for sponsorship reasons, will be a motor-racing championship using highly tuned tractor units. It is the 40th year of the championship. An eight-round season was announced on 6 December 2023, with the season beginning on 25 May at the Misano World Circuit Marco Simoncelli and ending on 6 October at the Circuito del Jarama. The season was shortened to seven rounds pre-season due to the cancellation of the round at the Tor Poznań.

== Schedule ==
An eight-round season was announced on 6 December 2023. All venues from the 2023 season were initially slated to return.

On 19 March, the series announced that the scheduled round in Poland at the Tor Poznań was cancelled due to temporary infrastructure problems at the venue, dropping the season to seven events.

Round		Circuit	Date
1	R1	(Italy) Misano World Circuit Marco Simoncelli, Misano Adriatico	25 May
1	R2	(Italy) Misano World Circuit Marco Simoncelli, Misano Adriatico	25 May
1	R3	(Italy) Misano World Circuit Marco Simoncelli, Misano Adriatico	26 May
1	R4	(Italy) Misano World Circuit Marco Simoncelli, Misano Adriatico	26 May
2	R1	Slovakia Ring, Orechová Potôň	8 June
2	R2	Slovakia Ring, Orechová Potôň	8 June
2	R3	Slovakia Ring, Orechová Potôň	9 June
2	R4	Slovakia Ring, Orechová Potôň	9 June
3	R1	(Belgium) Circuit Zolder, Heusden-Zolder	22 June
3	R2	(Belgium) Circuit Zolder, Heusden-Zolder	22 June
3	R3	(Belgium) Circuit Zolder, Heusden-Zolder	23 June
3	R4	(Belgium) Circuit Zolder, Heusden-Zolder	23 June
4	R1	(Germany) Nürburgring, Nürburg	13 July
4	R2	(Germany) Nürburgring, Nürburg	13 July
4	R3	(Germany) Nürburgring, Nürburg	14 July
4	R4	(Germany) Nürburgring, Nürburg	14 July
5	R1	(Czech Republic) Autodrom Most, Most	31 August
5	R2	(Czech Republic) Autodrom Most, Most	31 August
5	R3	(Czech Republic) Autodrom Most, Most	1 September
5	R4	(Czech Republic) Autodrom Most, Most	1 September
6	R1	(France) Bugatti Circuit, Le Mans	28 September
6	R2	(France) Bugatti Circuit, Le Mans	28 September
6	R3	(France) Bugatti Circuit, Le Mans	29 September
6	R4	(France) Bugatti Circuit, Le Mans	29 September
7	R1	(Spain) Circuito del Jarama, San Sebastián de los Reyes	5 October
7	R2	(Spain) Circuito del Jarama, San Sebastián de los Reyes	5 October
7	R3	(Spain) Circuito del Jarama, San Sebastián de los Reyes	6 October
7	R4	(Spain) Circuito del Jarama, San Sebastián de los Reyes	6 October

== Teams and drivers ==
The full season entry list was released on 26 April. Race-by-race entries will be announced throughout the season.

The following table lists all teams and drivers to compete in the 2024 championship.

Team	Manufacturer	No.	Drivers	Rounds	Class
(Germany) Don't Touch Racing	Iveco	11	(Germany) André Kursim	All	
(Germany) Don't Touch Racing	MAN	33	(United Kingdom) Bradley Smith	4–7	C
(United Kingdom) Garrett Trucksport	MAN	42	(United Kingdom) Luke Garrett	1–4, 6–7	C
(Germany) Hecker Racing	Scania	25	(Germany) Heinrich Clemens-Hecker	1, 3–7	C
(United Kingdom) Janes Trucksport	Freightliner	46	(United Kingdom) Bradley Smith	1	C
(Germany) Kursch Kurtscheid Racing	MAN	32	(Germany) Stefan Kursch	6	C
(France) Lion Truck Racing	MAN	66	(France) Jonathan André	4, 7	C
(Spain) Luis Recuenco	Iveco	64	(Spain) Luis Recuenco	All	C
(United Kingdom) NWT Motorsport	MAN	18	(United Kingdom) John Newell	All	C
(Portugal) Reboconort Racing Truck Team	MAN	38	(Portugal) José Eduardo Rodrigues	All	C
(United Kingdom) Reid Trucksport	Iveco	68	(United Kingdom) Craig Reid	6–7	C
(Hungary) Révész Racing	MAN	1	(Hungary) Norbert Kiss	All	
(United Kingdom) SF Trucksport	Iveco	92	(United Kingdom) Simon Faulkner	6–7	C
(Germany) SL Apollo Tyres Trucksport	MAN	3	(Germany) Sascha Lenz	All	
(Germany) T Sport Bernau	MAN	23	(Spain) Antonio Albacete	All	
(Germany) Tankpool 24 Racing	Scania	24	(Germany) Steffen Faas	All	C
(United Kingdom) Taylors Trucksport Racing	MAN	81	(United Kingdom) Mark Taylor	All	C
(Germany) Team Hahn Racing	Iveco	2	(Germany) Jochen Hahn	All	
(Germany) Team Hahn Racing	Iveco	22	(Germany) Lukas Hahn	3–4, 6	C
(Germany) Team Schwabentruck	Iveco	44	(Germany) Stephanie Halm	All	

Icon	Class
C	Chrome Class

== Results and standings ==
=== Season summary ===
Round		Circuit	Pole position	Fastest lap	Winning driver	Winning team	CHROME winner
1	R1	(Italy) Misano World Circuit Marco Simoncelli, Misano Adriatico	(Hungary) Norbert Kiss	(Hungary) Norbert Kiss	(Hungary) Norbert Kiss	(Hungary) Révész Racing	(Portugal) José Eduardo Rodrigues
1	R2	(Italy) Misano World Circuit Marco Simoncelli, Misano Adriatico		(Hungary) Norbert Kiss	(Hungary) Norbert Kiss	(Hungary) Révész Racing	(Germany) Steffen Faas
1	R3	(Italy) Misano World Circuit Marco Simoncelli, Misano Adriatico	(Hungary) Norbert Kiss	(Hungary) Norbert Kiss	(Hungary) Norbert Kiss	(Hungary) Révész Racing	(Germany) Steffen Faas
1	R4	(Italy) Misano World Circuit Marco Simoncelli, Misano Adriatico		(Hungary) Norbert Kiss	(Hungary) Norbert Kiss	(Hungary) Révész Racing	(Portugal) José Eduardo Rodrigues
2	R1	Slovakia Ring, Orechová Potôň	(Hungary) Norbert Kiss	(Hungary) Norbert Kiss	(Hungary) Norbert Kiss	(Hungary) Révész Racing	(Portugal) José Eduardo Rodrigues
2	R2	Slovakia Ring, Orechová Potôň		(Hungary) Norbert Kiss	(Hungary) Norbert Kiss	(Hungary) Révész Racing	(Portugal) José Eduardo Rodrigues
2	R3	Slovakia Ring, Orechová Potôň	(Hungary) Norbert Kiss	(Hungary) Norbert Kiss	(Hungary) Norbert Kiss	(Hungary) Révész Racing	(Portugal) José Eduardo Rodrigues
2	R4	Slovakia Ring, Orechová Potôň		(Hungary) Norbert Kiss	(Hungary) Norbert Kiss	(Hungary) Révész Racing	(Portugal) José Eduardo Rodrigues
3	R1	(Belgium) Circuit Zolder, Heusden-Zolder	(Hungary) Norbert Kiss	(Hungary) Norbert Kiss	(Hungary) Norbert Kiss	(Hungary) Révész Racing	(Portugal) José Eduardo Rodrigues
3	R2	(Belgium) Circuit Zolder, Heusden-Zolder		(Hungary) Norbert Kiss	(Hungary) Norbert Kiss	(Hungary) Révész Racing	(Germany) Lukas Hahn
3	R3	(Belgium) Circuit Zolder, Heusden-Zolder	(Hungary) Norbert Kiss	(Hungary) Norbert Kiss	(Hungary) Norbert Kiss	(Hungary) Révész Racing	(Germany) Lukas Hahn
3	R4	(Belgium) Circuit Zolder, Heusden-Zolder		(Hungary) Norbert Kiss	(Germany) Jochen Hahn	(Germany) Team Hahn Racing	(Germany) Lukas Hahn
4	R1	(Germany) Nürburgring, Nürburg	(Hungary) Norbert Kiss	(Hungary) Norbert Kiss	(Hungary) Norbert Kiss	(Hungary) Révész Racing	(Germany) Lukas Hahn
4	R2	(Germany) Nürburgring, Nürburg		(Hungary) Norbert Kiss	(Germany) Stephanie Halm	(Germany) Team Schwabentruck	(Portugal) José Eduardo Rodrigues
4	R3	(Germany) Nürburgring, Nürburg	(Hungary) Norbert Kiss	(Hungary) Norbert Kiss	(Hungary) Norbert Kiss	(Hungary) Révész Racing	(Portugal) José Eduardo Rodrigues
4	R4	(Germany) Nürburgring, Nürburg		(Hungary) Norbert Kiss	(Spain) Antonio Albacete	(Germany) T Sport Bernau	(Portugal) José Eduardo Rodrigues
5	R1	(Czech Republic) Autodrom Most, Most	(Hungary) Norbert Kiss	(Hungary) Norbert Kiss	(Hungary) Norbert Kiss	(Hungary) Révész Racing	(United Kingdom) Mark Taylor
5	R2	(Czech Republic) Autodrom Most, Most		(Hungary) Norbert Kiss	(Spain) Antonio Albacete	(Germany) T Sport Bernau	(United Kingdom) Mark Taylor
5	R3	(Czech Republic) Autodrom Most, Most	(Hungary) Norbert Kiss	(Germany) Jochen Hahn	(Hungary) Norbert Kiss	(Hungary) Révész Racing	(Portugal) José Eduardo Rodrigues
5	R4	(Czech Republic) Autodrom Most, Most		(Hungary) Norbert Kiss	(Portugal) José Eduardo Rodrigues	(Portugal) Reboconort Racing Truck Team	(Portugal) José Eduardo Rodrigues
6	R1	(France) Bugatti Circuit, Le Mans	(Hungary) Norbert Kiss	(Hungary) Norbert Kiss	(Hungary) Norbert Kiss	(Hungary) Révész Racing	(Portugal) José Eduardo Rodrigues
6	R2	(France) Bugatti Circuit, Le Mans		(Germany) Jochen Hahn	(Portugal) José Eduardo Rodrigues	(Portugal) Reboconort Racing Truck Team	(Portugal) José Eduardo Rodrigues
6	R3	(France) Bugatti Circuit, Le Mans	(Hungary) Norbert Kiss	(Hungary) Norbert Kiss	(Hungary) Norbert Kiss	(Hungary) Révész Racing	(Portugal) José Eduardo Rodrigues
6	R4	(France) Bugatti Circuit, Le Mans		(Germany) Jochen Hahn	(Germany) Lukas Hahn	(Germany) Team Hahn Racing	(Germany) Lukas Hahn
7	R1	(Spain) Circuito del Jarama, San Sebastián de los Reyes	(Hungary) Norbert Kiss	(Hungary) Norbert Kiss	(Hungary) Norbert Kiss	(Hungary) Révész Racing	(Portugal) José Eduardo Rodrigues
7	R2	(Spain) Circuito del Jarama, San Sebastián de los Reyes		(Germany) Sascha Lenz	(Germany) Stephanie Halm	(Germany) Team Schwabentruck	(United Kingdom) Mark Taylor
7	R3	(Spain) Circuito del Jarama, San Sebastián de los Reyes	(Hungary) Norbert Kiss	(Hungary) Norbert Kiss	(Hungary) Norbert Kiss	(Hungary) Révész Racing	(Portugal) José Eduardo Rodrigues
7	R4	(Spain) Circuito del Jarama, San Sebastián de los Reyes		(Hungary) Norbert Kiss	(Spain) Antonio Albacete	(Germany) T Sport Bernau	(United Kingdom) Mark Taylor

=== Drivers standings ===
At each race, points are awarded to the top ten classified finishers using the following structure:

Position	**1st**	**2nd**	**3rd**	**4th**	**5th**	**6th**	**7th**	**8th**	**9th**	**10th**
Points (races 1 and 3)	20	15	12	10	8	6	4	3	2	1
Points (races 2 and 4)	10	9	8	7	6	5	4	3	2	1

=== Overall Standings ===
Pos.	Driver	MIS (Italy)				SVK (Slovakia)				ZOL (Belgium)				NUR (Germany)				MOS (Czech Republic)				LMS (France)				JAR (Spain)				Pts.
1	(Hungary) Norbert Kiss	**1**	1	**1**	1	**1**	1	**1**	1	**1**	1	**1**	3	**1**	3	**1**	4	**1**	3	**1**	2	**1**	4	**1**	4	**1**	3	**1**	6	397
2	(Germany) Jochen Hahn	2	2	2	6	2	6	2	6	3	2	2	1	2	2	2	2	2	2	2	7	2	5	2	7	4	4	2	5	299
3	(Germany) Sascha Lenz	3	3	4	7	4	3	3	4	Ret	6	3	5	3	6	3	3	3	5	3	4	4	6	3	3	2	6	3	9	237
4	(Spain) Antonio Albacete	4	8	3	4	3	9	4	5	2	7	4	4	4	7	7	1	8	1	4	8	3	13	4	5	3	Ret	8	1	205
5	(Germany) Stephanie Halm	6	4	6	3	7	2	7	3	6	5	5	Ret	8	1	8	5	4	4	8	5	6	3	5	2	7	1	4	4	182
6	(Germany) André Kursim	7	7	8	5	5	5	5	7	5	4	6	9	6	5	6	6	10	6	5	6	5	2	6	8	6	5	5	7	158
7	(Portugal) José Eduardo Rodrigues	5	Ret	7	2	6	4	6	2	4	8	DNS	DNS	7	4	4	7	6	11	6	1	7	1	7	6	5	Ret	6	3	154
8	(United Kingdom) Mark Taylor	12	10	10	9	10	10	8	9	9	9	10	7	11	10	9	9	5	7	7	3	12	9	9	9	8	2	7	2	80
9	(Germany) Lukas Hahn									8	3	7	2	5	8	5	8					8	7	8	1					66
10	(Germany) Steffen Faas	9	5	5	8	8	7	11	Ret	7	12	9	8	9	9	10	11	9	8	11	9	9	8	12	11	9	7	9	8	63
11	(United Kingdom) John Newell	11	6	Ret	10	9	8	9	8	10	10	8	Ret	14	12	12	12	7	Ret	10	10	11	10	10	10	10	8	12	Ret	34
12	(Germany) Heinrich Clemens-Hecker	8	9	Ret	12					Ret	11	12	6	10	16	11	10	13	9	9	11	10	Ret	13	16	13	12	13	12	17
13	(Spain) Luis Recuenco	10	Ret	9	11	11	11	10	11	11	13	13	Ret	13	15	13	15	11	10	12	12	14	12	11	Ret	14	11	10	10	7
14	(United Kingdom) Luke Garrett	14	11	Ret	14	12	Ret	Ret	10	Ret	Ret	11	10	15	14	16	DNS					13	11	14	12	15	DNS	DNS	14	2
15	(France) Jonathan André													DSQ	13	14	13									11	9	14	13	2
16	(United Kingdom) Bradley Smith	13	DNS	11	13									12	11	15	14	12	12	13	13	16	14	16	14	12	10	11	11	1
17	(United Kingdom) Craig Reid																					15	16	17	Ret	16	13	15	16	0
18	(Germany) Stefan Kursch																					17	15	15	13					0
19	(United Kingdom) Simon Faulkner																					18	17	18	15	DNS	14	16	15	0
Pos.	Driver	MIS (Italy)				SVK (Slovakia)				ZOL (Belgium)				NUR (Germany)				MOS (Czech Republic)				LMS (France)				JAR (Spain)				Pts.

Colour	Result
Gold	Winner
Silver	Second place
Bronze	Third place
Green	Points classification
Blue	Non-points classification
Blue	Non-classified finish (NC)
Purple	Retired, not classified (Ret)
Red	Did not qualify (DNQ)
Red	Did not pre-qualify (DNPQ)
Black	Disqualified (DSQ)
White	Did not start (DNS)
White	Withdrew (WD)
White	Race cancelled (C)
Blank	Did not practice (DNP)
Blank	Did not arrive (DNA)
Blank	Excluded (EX)

**Bold** – Pole
Italics – Fastest Lap

== Bibliography ==
- Göttl, Thomas Paul; Trost, Oliver (2024). "Truck Race Spezial 2024". Fernfahrer (Special Edition) (in German). Stuttgart: ETM Verlag. ISSN 0257-3180.
