= 2022 European Truck Racing Championship =

The 2022 European Truck Racing Championship was a motor-racing championship using highly tuned tractor units. It was the 38th year of the championship. An eight-round season was announced on 21 December 2021, with the season beginning on 21 May at the Misano World Circuit Marco Simoncelli and ended on 2 October at the Circuito del Jarama.

== Schedule ==
An eight-round calendar was announced on 21 December 2021. The Slovakia Ring returned to the series schedule after being removed for the previous season. The round at the Nürburgring also returned after the 2021 European floods forced its cancellation the previous year.

Round		Circuit	Date
1	R1	(Italy) Misano World Circuit Marco Simoncelli, Misano Adriatico	21 May
1	R2	(Italy) Misano World Circuit Marco Simoncelli, Misano Adriatico	21 May
1	R3	(Italy) Misano World Circuit Marco Simoncelli, Misano Adriatico	22 May
1	R4	(Italy) Misano World Circuit Marco Simoncelli, Misano Adriatico	22 May
2	R1	(Hungary) Hungaroring, Mogyoród	11 June
2	R2	(Hungary) Hungaroring, Mogyoród	11 June
2	R3	(Hungary) Hungaroring, Mogyoród	12 June
2	R4	(Hungary) Hungaroring, Mogyoród	12 June
3	R1	Slovakia Ring, Orechová Potôň	2 July
3	R2	Slovakia Ring, Orechová Potôň	2 July
3	R3	Slovakia Ring, Orechová Potôň	3 July
3	R4	Slovakia Ring, Orechová Potôň	3 July
4	R1	(Germany) Nürburgring, Nürburg	16 July
4	R2	(Germany) Nürburgring, Nürburg	16 July
4	R3	(Germany) Nürburgring, Nürburg	17 July
4	R4	(Germany) Nürburgring, Nürburg	17 July
5	R1	(Czech Republic) Autodrom Most, Most	3 September
5	R2	(Czech Republic) Autodrom Most, Most	3 September
5	R3	(Czech Republic) Autodrom Most, Most	4 September
5	R4	(Czech Republic) Autodrom Most, Most	4 September
6	R1	(Belgium) Circuit Zolder, Heusden-Zolder	10 September
6	R2	(Belgium) Circuit Zolder, Heusden-Zolder	10 September
6	R3	(Belgium) Circuit Zolder, Heusden-Zolder	11 September
6	R4	(Belgium) Circuit Zolder, Heusden-Zolder	11 September
7	R1	(France) Bugatti Circuit, Le Mans	24 September
7	R2	(France) Bugatti Circuit, Le Mans	24 September
7	R3	(France) Bugatti Circuit, Le Mans	25 September
7	R4	(France) Bugatti Circuit, Le Mans	25 September
8	R1	(Spain) Circuito del Jarama, San Sebastián de los Reyes	1 October
8	R2	(Spain) Circuito del Jarama, San Sebastián de los Reyes	1 October
8	R3	(Spain) Circuito del Jarama, San Sebastián de los Reyes	2 October
8	R4	(Spain) Circuito del Jarama, San Sebastián de los Reyes	2 October

== Teams and drivers ==
The full season entry list was released on 27 April. Race-by-race entries will be announced throughout the season.

The following table lists all teams and drivers to compete in the 2022 championship.

Team	Manufacturer	No.	Drivers	Rounds	Class
(United Kingdom) Anderson Racing	MAN	33	(United Kingdom) Jamie Anderson	All	G
(United Kingdom) Apollo Tires TOR Truck Racing	MAN	17	(United Kingdom) Shane Brereton	All	G
(Czech Republic) Buggyra ZM Racing	Freightliner	20	(France) Téo Calvet	All	G
(Czech Republic) Buggyra ZM Racing	Freightliner	55	(Czech Republic) Adam Lacko	All	
(Germany) Don't Touch Racing	Iveco	11	(Germany) André Kursim	All	
(Netherlands) EK Truckrace	Scania	15	(Netherlands) Erwin Kleinnagelvoort	4	G
(Germany) Hecker Racing	Scania	25	(Germany) Heinrich Clemens-Hecker	1–4, 6–7	G
(Germany) Kursch Kurtscheid Racing	MAN	32	(Germany) Stefan Kursch	4	G
(France) Lion Truck Racing	MAN	66	(France) Anthony Janiec	1–2, 4	
(France) Lion Truck Racing	MAN	66	(France) Jonathan André	5–6	G
(Spain) Luis Recuenco	MAN	64	(Spain) Luis Recuenco	3–4	G
(Portugal) Reboconorte Racing Truck Team	MAN	14	(Portugal) José Rodrigues	1, 3–5, 7	G
(Germany) Reinert Racing	Iveco	77	(Germany) René Reinert	1	
(Germany) Reinert Racing	Iveco	77	(United Kingdom) Martin Gibson	2	G
(Hungary) Révész Racing	MAN	1	(Hungary) Norbert Kiss	All	
(Germany) SL Trucksport 30	MAN	2	(Germany) Sascha Lenz	All	
(Germany) T Sport Bernau	MAN	23	(Spain) Antonio Albacete	All	
(Germany) Tankpool 24 Racing	Scania	24	(Germany) Steffan Faas	All	G
(Germany) Team Hahn Racing	Iveco	4	(Germany) Jochen Hahn	All	
(Germany) Team Hahn Racing	Iveco	22	(Germany) Lukas Hahn	4–5	G
(France) Team Robineau	MAN	21	(France) Thomas Robineau	1	G
(Germany) Team Schwabentruck	Iveco	28	(Finland) Emma Mäkinen	4	G
(Germany) Team Schwabentruck	Iveco	44	(Germany) Stephanie Halm	All	
Entries ineligible to score points
(United Kingdom) NWT Motorsport	MAN	18	(United Kingdom) John Newell	7	G
(Portugal) Reboconorte Racing Truck Team	MAN	14	(Portugal) José Eduardo Rodrigues	6	G

Icon	Class
G	Goodyear Cup

== Results and standings ==
=== Season summary ===
Round		Circuit	Pole position	Fastest lap	Winning driver	Winning team	Goodyear Cup winner
1	R1	(Italy) Misano World Circuit Marco Simoncelli, Misano Adriatico	(Hungary) Norbert Kiss	(Hungary) Norbert Kiss	(Hungary) Norbert Kiss	(Hungary) Révész Racing	(France) Téo Calvet
1	R2	(Italy) Misano World Circuit Marco Simoncelli, Misano Adriatico		(Czech Republic) Adam Lacko	(Spain) Antonio Albacete	(Germany) T Sport Bernau	(United Kingdom) Shane Brereton
1	R3	(Italy) Misano World Circuit Marco Simoncelli, Misano Adriatico	(Hungary) Norbert Kiss	(Hungary) Norbert Kiss	(Hungary) Norbert Kiss	(Hungary) Révész Racing	(France) Téo Calvet
1	R4	(Italy) Misano World Circuit Marco Simoncelli, Misano Adriatico		(Germany) Sascha Lenz	(Germany) Sascha Lenz	(Germany) SL Trucksport 30	(France) Téo Calvet
2	R1	(Hungary) Hungaroring, Mogyoród	(Hungary) Norbert Kiss	(Hungary) Norbert Kiss	(Hungary) Norbert Kiss	(Hungary) Révész Racing	(United Kingdom) Shane Brereton
2	R2	(Hungary) Hungaroring, Mogyoród		(Czech Republic) Adam Lacko	(Czech Republic) Adam Lacko	(Czech Republic) Buggyra ZM Racing	(Germany) Steffen Faas
2	R3	(Hungary) Hungaroring, Mogyoród	(Hungary) Norbert Kiss	(Hungary) Norbert Kiss	(Hungary) Norbert Kiss	(Hungary) Révész Racing	(United Kingdom) Jamie Anderson
2	R4	(Hungary) Hungaroring, Mogyoród		(Hungary) Norbert Kiss	(Hungary) Norbert Kiss	(Hungary) Révész Racing	(United Kingdom) Jamie Anderson
3	R1	Slovakia Ring, Orechová Potôň	(Hungary) Norbert Kiss	(Hungary) Norbert Kiss	(Hungary) Norbert Kiss	(Hungary) Révész Racing	(United Kingdom) Jamie Anderson
3	R2	Slovakia Ring, Orechová Potôň		(Hungary) Norbert Kiss	(United Kingdom) Jamie Anderson	(United Kingdom) Anderson Racing	(United Kingdom) Jamie Anderson
3	R3	Slovakia Ring, Orechová Potôň	(Hungary) Norbert Kiss	(Hungary) Norbert Kiss	(Hungary) Norbert Kiss	(Hungary) Révész Racing	(United Kingdom) Jamie Anderson
3	R4	Slovakia Ring, Orechová Potôň		(Germany) Sascha Lenz	(Hungary) Norbert Kiss	(Hungary) Révész Racing	(United Kingdom) Jamie Anderson
4	R1	(Germany) Nürburgring, Nürburg	(Hungary) Norbert Kiss	(Hungary) Norbert Kiss	(Hungary) Norbert Kiss	(Hungary) Révész Racing	(France) Téo Calvet
4	R2	(Germany) Nürburgring, Nürburg		(Hungary) Norbert Kiss	(Germany) Lukas Hahn	(Germany) Team Hahn Racing	(Germany) Lukas Hahn
4	R3	(Germany) Nürburgring, Nürburg	(Germany) Jochen Hahn	(Germany) Jochen Hahn	(Germany) Jochen Hahn	(Germany) Team Hahn Racing	(France) Téo Calvet
4	R4	(Germany) Nürburgring, Nürburg		(Hungary) Norbert Kiss	(United Kingdom) Jamie Anderson	(United Kingdom) Anderson Racing	(United Kingdom) Jamie Anderson
5	R1	(Czech Republic) Autodrom Most, Most	(Hungary) Norbert Kiss	(Hungary) Norbert Kiss	(Hungary) Norbert Kiss	(Hungary) Révész Racing	(France) Téo Calvet
5	R2	(Czech Republic) Autodrom Most, Most		(Germany) Sascha Lenz	(United Kingdom) Jamie Anderson	(United Kingdom) Anderson Racing	(United Kingdom) Jamie Anderson
5	R3	(Czech Republic) Autodrom Most, Most	(Hungary) Norbert Kiss	(Hungary) Norbert Kiss	(Hungary) Norbert Kiss	(Hungary) Révész Racing	(France) Téo Calvet
5	R4	(Czech Republic) Autodrom Most, Most		(Hungary) Norbert Kiss	(United Kingdom) Jamie Anderson	(United Kingdom) Anderson Racing	(United Kingdom) Jamie Anderson
6	R1	(Belgium) Circuit Zolder, Heusden-Zolder	(Hungary) Norbert Kiss	(Germany) Sascha Lenz	(Germany) Sascha Lenz	(Germany) SL Trucksport 30	(France) Téo Calvet
6	R2	(Belgium) Circuit Zolder, Heusden-Zolder		(Hungary) Norbert Kiss	(Germany) Jochen Hahn	(Germany) Team Hahn Racing	(Germany) Steffan Faas
6	R3	(Belgium) Circuit Zolder, Heusden-Zolder	(Hungary) Norbert Kiss	(Hungary) Norbert Kiss	(Hungary) Norbert Kiss	(Hungary) Révész Racing	(France) Téo Calvet
6	R4	(Belgium) Circuit Zolder, Heusden-Zolder		(Germany) Jochen Hahn	(Czech Republic) Adam Lacko	(Czech Republic) Buggyra ZM Racing	(United Kingdom) Shane Brereton
7	R1	(France) Bugatti Circuit, Le Mans	(Hungary) Norbert Kiss	(Hungary) Norbert Kiss	(Hungary) Norbert Kiss	(Hungary) Révész Racing	(United Kingdom) Jamie Anderson
7	R2	(France) Bugatti Circuit, Le Mans		(Germany) Sascha Lenz	(France) Téo Calvet	(Czech Republic) Buggyra ZM Racing	(France) Téo Calvet
7	R3	(France) Bugatti Circuit, Le Mans	(Hungary) Norbert Kiss	(Hungary) Norbert Kiss	(Hungary) Norbert Kiss	(Hungary) Révész Racing	(United Kingdom) Jamie Anderson
7	R4	(France) Bugatti Circuit, Le Mans		(United Kingdom) Jamie Anderson	(United Kingdom) Shane Brereton	(United Kingdom) Apollo Tyres TOR Truck Racing	(United Kingdom) Shane Brereton
8	R1	(Spain) Circuito del Jarama, San Sebastián de los Reyes	(Hungary) Norbert Kiss	(Hungary) Norbert Kiss	(Hungary) Norbert Kiss	(Hungary) Révész Racing	(France) Téo Calvet
8	R2	(Spain) Circuito del Jarama, San Sebastián de los Reyes		(France) Téo Calvet	(Germany) André Kursim	(Germany) Don't Touch Racing	(France) Téo Calvet
8	R3	(Spain) Circuito del Jarama, San Sebastián de los Reyes	(Hungary) Norbert Kiss	(Hungary) Norbert Kiss	(Hungary) Norbert Kiss	(Hungary) Révész Racing	(United Kingdom) Jamie Anderson
8	R4	(Spain) Circuito del Jarama, San Sebastián de los Reyes		(Germany) Jochen Hahn	(France) Téo Calvet	(Czech Republic) Buggyra ZM Racing	(France) Téo Calvet

=== Drivers standings ===
At each race, points are awarded to the top ten classified finishers using the following structure:

Position	**1st**	**2nd**	**3rd**	**4th**	**5th**	**6th**	**7th**	**8th**	**9th**	**10th**
Points (races 1 and 3)	20	15	12	10	8	6	4	3	2	1
Points (races 2 and 4)	10	9	8	7	6	5	4	3	2	1

Pos.	Driver	MIS (Italy)				HUN (Hungary)				SVK (Slovakia)				NUR (Germany)				MOS (Czech Republic)				ZOL (Belgium)				LMS (France)				JAR (Spain)				Pts.
1	(Hungary) Norbert Kiss	**1**	3	**1**	8	**1**	DNS	**1**	1	**1**	2	**1**	1	**1**	4	4	2	**1**	4	**1**	7	**2**	2	**1**	9	**1**	2	**1**	4	**1**	5	**1**	6	410
2	(Germany) Jochen Hahn	2	4	2	3	3	DNS	3	2	3	4	3	5	3	5	**1**	6	2	5	3	5	7	1	2	2	4	4	2	8	2	7	DNS	5	295
3	(Germany) Sascha Lenz	3	2	3	1	2	3	4	4	2	5	2	2	17	8	2	5	3	11	2	6	1	13	3	4	2	7	5	3	4	4	4	Ret	285
4	(Czech Republic) Adam Lacko	5	Ret	5	Ret	4	1	2	3	4	6	4	8	2	6	5	4	4	2	5	2	3	4	4	1	5	5	4	6	5	3	2	4	264
5	(Spain) Antonio Albacete	4	1	4	2	5	DNS	10	8	7	3	12	7	4	2	3	Ret	Ret	7	4	4	4	5	10	6	3	Ret	6	5	3	6	3	8	197
6	(United Kingdom) Jamie Anderson	12	12	14	10	9	DNS	5	6	8	1	5	4	Ret	14	8	1	6	1	8	1	6	9	6	Ret	6	3	3	7	7	9	5	7	149
7	(Germany) Stephanie Halm	7	6	6	5	6	4	7	5	5	7	6	Ret	6	3	6	3	9	Ret	10	9	12	6	9	3	Ret	9	10	9	9	10	6	3	132
8	(France) Téo Calvet	6	11	8	4	11	Ret	8	Ret	14	11	10	13	5	7	7	7	5	12	6	8	5	10	5	12	7	1	7	2	6	2	7	1	131
9	(Germany) André Kursim	15	7	7	Ret	8	2	6	9	6	8	7	3	7	10	9	8	12	10	12	13	8	3	7	5	8	6	9	10	8	1	8	2	117
10	(United Kingdom) Shane Brereton	9	9	15	7	7	8	9	10	10	12	8	11	10	12	13	12	10	6	13	11	10	11	8	7	9	11	8	1	12	Ret	12	9	55
11	(Germany) Lukas Hahn													8	1	12	9	8	3	7	3													38
12	(Germany) Steffen Faas	13	10	12	Ret	DNS	5	DNS	DNS	9	10	9	9	Ret	13	10	11	Ret	8	9	12	9	7	Ret	8	10	8	12	12	11	8	DNS	DNS	36
13	(Portugal) José Rodrigues	11	13	9	13					11	9	11	6	9	9	14	10	7	9	11	10					11	10	11	11	10	Ret	9	11	25
14	(France) Anthony Janiec	14	8	10	6	10	DSQ	11	7					11	11	11	13																	13
15	(Germany) Réne Reinert	8	5	11	9																													11
16	(Germany) Heinrich Clemens-Hecker	16	DNS	16	11	12	7	13	11	12	13	14	10	12	15	15	15					13	14	11	10	13	12	13	14	15	13	Ret	12	6
17	(United Kingdom) Martin Gibson					13	6	12	12																									5
18	(France) Jonathan André																	11	Ret	14	14	14	12	12	11					14	12	11	10	2
19	(France) Thomas Robineau	10	14	13	12																													1
20	(Spain) Luis Recuenco									13	14	13	12	14	17	17	14																	0
21	(Netherlands) Erwin Kleinnagelvoort													13	19	WD	WD																	0
22	(Germany) Stefan Kursch													15	18	18	16																	0
23	(Finland) Emma Mäkinen													16	16	16	17																	0
Drivers ineligible to score points
–	(Portugal) José Eduardo Rodrigues																					11	8	13	Ret									0
–	(United Kingdom) John Newell																									12	13	14	13	13	11	10	13	0
Pos.	Driver	MIS (Italy)				HUN (Hungary)				SVK (Slovakia)				NUR (Germany)				MOS (Czech Republic)				ZOL (Belgium)				LMS (France)				JAR (Spain)				Pts.

Colour	Result
Gold	Winner
Silver	Second place
Bronze	Third place
Green	Points classification
Blue	Non-points classification
Blue	Non-classified finish (NC)
Purple	Retired, not classified (Ret)
Red	Did not qualify (DNQ)
Red	Did not pre-qualify (DNPQ)
Black	Disqualified (DSQ)
White	Did not start (DNS)
White	Withdrew (WD)
White	Race cancelled (C)
Blank	Did not practice (DNP)
Blank	Did not arrive (DNA)
Blank	Excluded (EX)

**Bold** – Pole
Italics – Fastest Lap

== Bibliography ==
- Göttl, Thomas Paul; Trost, Oliver (2022). "Truck Race Spezial 2022". Fernfahrer (Special Edition) (in German). Stuttgart: ETM Verlag. ISSN 0257-3180.
