= 2014 European Truck Racing Championship =

Seasons
- ← 2013 2015 →

The 2014 FIA European Truck Racing Championship was a motor-racing championship using highly tuned tractor units. It was the 30th year of the championship. Norbert Kiss won his first title with MAN, ending Jochen Hahn's run of three successive titles.

== Teams and drivers ==
No.	Driver	Team	Manufacturer	Rounds

Race drivers without fixed number, whose number is defined race by race:

No.	Driver	Team	Manufacturer	Rounds

== Calendar and winners ==
Round		Circuit	Date	Pole position	Fastest lap	Winning driver	Winning team
1	R1	(Italy) Misano World Circuit	24-25 April	(Hungary) Norbert Kiss		(Germany) Jochen Hahn	(Germany) Castrol Team Hahn Racing
1	R2	(Italy) Misano World Circuit	24-25 April			(Hungary) Norbert Kiss	(Hungary) OXXO Energy Truck Race Team
1	R3	(Italy) Misano World Circuit	24-25 April	(Hungary) Norbert Kiss		(Hungary) Norbert Kiss	(Hungary) OXXO Energy Truck Race Team
1	R4	(Italy) Misano World Circuit	24-25 April			(Czech Republic) David Vršecký	(Czech Republic) Buggyra International Racing System
2	R1	(Spain) Circuito de Navarra	7-8 June	(Spain) Antonio Albacete		(Spain) Antonio Albacete	(Spain) Equipo Cepsa
2	R2	(Spain) Circuito de Navarra	7-8 June			(Czech Republic) David Vršecký	(Czech Republic) Buggyra International Racing System
2	R3	(Spain) Circuito de Navarra	7-8 June	(Spain) Antonio Albacete		(Spain) Antonio Albacete	(Spain) Equipo Cepsa
2	R4	(Spain) Circuito de Navarra	7-8 June			(Germany) Jochen Hahn	(Germany) Castrol Team Hahn Racing
3	R1	(France) Circuit Paul Armagnac	21-22 June	(Hungary) Norbert Kiss		(Spain) Antonio Albacete	(Spain) Equipo Cepsa
3	R2	(France) Circuit Paul Armagnac	21-22 June			(Czech Republic) Adam Lacko	(Czech Republic) Buggyra International Racing System
3	R3	(France) Circuit Paul Armagnac	21-22 June	(Germany) Jochen Hahn		(Germany) Jochen Hahn	(Germany) Castrol Team Hahn Racing
3	R4	(France) Circuit Paul Armagnac	21-22 June			(Switzerland) Markus Bösiger	(Germany) Truck Sport Lutz Bernau
4	R1	(Austria) Red Bull Ring	5-6 July	(Hungary) Norbert Kiss		(Hungary) Norbert Kiss	(Hungary) OXXO Energy Truck Race Team
4	R2	(Austria) Red Bull Ring	5-6 July			(Czech Republic) David Vršecký	(Czech Republic) Buggyra International Racing System
4	R3	(Austria) Red Bull Ring	5-6 July	(Germany) Jochen Hahn		(Germany) Jochen Hahn	(Germany) Castrol Team Hahn Racing
4	R4	(Austria) Red Bull Ring	5-6 July			(Czech Republic) Adam Lacko	(Czech Republic) Buggyra International Racing System
5	R1	(Germany) Nürburgring	19-20 July	(Spain) Antonio Albacete		(Spain) Antonio Albacete	(Spain) Equipo Cepsa
5	R2	(Germany) Nürburgring	19-20 July			(Switzerland) Markus Bösiger	(Germany) Truck Sport Lutz Bernau
5	R3	(Germany) Nürburgring	19-20 July	(Hungary) Norbert Kiss		(Germany) Jochen Hahn	(Germany) Castrol Team Hahn Racing
5	R4	(Germany) Nürburgring	19-20 July			(Czech Republic) Adam Lacko	(Czech Republic) Buggyra International Racing System
6	R1	(Czech Republic) Autodrom Most	30-31 August	(Hungary) Norbert Kiss		(Hungary) Norbert Kiss	(Hungary) OXXO Energy Truck Race Team
6	R2	(Czech Republic) Autodrom Most	30-31 August			(Czech Republic) Adam Lacko	(Czech Republic) Buggyra International Racing System
6	R3	(Czech Republic) Autodrom Most	30-31 August	(Czech Republic) David Vršecký		(Czech Republic) David Vršecký	(Czech Republic) Buggyra International Racing System
6	R4	(Czech Republic) Autodrom Most	30-31 August			(Spain) Antonio Albacete	(Spain) Equipo Cepsa
7	R1	(Belgium) Circuit Zolder	20-21 September	(Germany) Jochen Hahn		(Germany) Jochen Hahn	(Germany) Castrol Team Hahn Racing
7	R2	(Belgium) Circuit Zolder	20-21 September			(Switzerland) Markus Bösiger	(Germany) Truck Sport Lutz Bernau
7	R3	(Belgium) Circuit Zolder	20-21 September	(Spain) Antonio Albacete		(Hungary) Norbert Kiss	(Hungary) OXXO Energy Truck Race Team
7	R4	(Belgium) Circuit Zolder	20-21 September			(Czech Republic) Adam Lacko	(Czech Republic) Buggyra International Racing System
8	R1	(Spain) Circuito del Jarama	4-5 October	(Hungary) Norbert Kiss		(Hungary) Norbert Kiss	(Hungary) OXXO Energy Truck Race Team
8	R2	(Spain) Circuito del Jarama	4-5 October			(Czech Republic) Adam Lacko	(Czech Republic) Buggyra International Racing System
8	R3	(Spain) Circuito del Jarama	4-5 October	(Hungary) Norbert Kiss		(Hungary) Norbert Kiss	(Hungary) OXXO Energy Truck Race Team
8	R4	(Spain) Circuito del Jarama	4-5 October			(Switzerland) Markus Bösiger	(Germany) Truck Sport Lutz Bernau
9	R1	(France) Bugatti Circuit	11-12 October	(Hungary) Norbert Kiss		(Hungary) Norbert Kiss	(Hungary) OXXO Energy Truck Race Team
9	R2	(France) Bugatti Circuit	11-12 October			(Czech Republic) Adam Lacko	(Czech Republic) Buggyra International Racing System
9	R3	(France) Bugatti Circuit	11-12 October	(Hungary) Norbert Kiss		(Hungary) Norbert Kiss	(Hungary) OXXO Energy Truck Race Team
9	R4	(France) Bugatti Circuit	11-12 October			(Czech Republic) Adam Lacko	(Czech Republic) Buggyra International Racing System

== Championship overall standings ==
=== Drivers' championship ===
Each round or racing event consisted of four races. At the races 1 and 3, the points awarded according to the ranking was on a 20, 15, 12, 10, 8, 6, 4, 3, 2, 1 basis to the top 10 finishers – at the races 2 and 4 with reversed grid, the points awarded were 10, 9, 8, 7, 6, 5, 4, 3, 2, 1 (rank 1 - 10) respectively.

Rank	Driver	Truck	Points
1	(Hungary) Norbert Kiss	MAN	401
2	(Germany) Jochen Hahn	MAN	383
3	(Spain) Antonio Albacete	MAN	377
4	(Czech Republic) Adam Lacko	Freightliner	314
5	(Czech Republic) David Vršecký	Freightliner	255
6	(Switzerland) Markus Bösiger	MAN	235
7	(Germany) René Reinert	MAN	137
8	(France) Anthony Janiec	MAN	70
9	(Czech Republic) Frankie Vojtíšek	MAN	61
10	(Germany) Stephanie Halm	MAN	49

Rank	Driver	Truck	Points
11	(Hungary) Benedek Major	MAN	49
12	(Germany) Gerd Körber	Iveco	38
13	(Portugal) José Rodrigues	Renault	21
14	(Portugal) José Teodosio	Renault	20
15	(Spain) Javier Mariezcurrena	MAN	10
16	(Germany) Ellen Lohr	MAN	9
17	(Belgium) Jean-Pierre Blaise	MAN	8
18	(France) Jeremy Robineau	MAN	8
19	(Austria) Markus Altenstrasser	Iveco	3
20	(Kazakhstan) Artur Ardavichus	MAN	0

Rank	Driver	Truck	Points
21	(Spain) Pedro Ignacio García	Iveco	0
22	(Netherlands) Erwin Kleinnagelvoort	Scania	0
23	(Germany) André Kursim	Mercedes-Benz	0
24	(Germany) Heinz-Werner Lenz	Mercedes-Benz	0
25	(Spain) David Marco Bermejo	MAN	0
26	(France) Dominique Orsini	Mercedes-Benz	0
27	(France) Florian Orsini	Mercedes-Benz	0
28	(Portugal) Eduardo Rodrigues	MAN	0
29	(Portugal) José-Manuel de Sousa	Renault	0
30	(Netherlands) Cees Zandbergen	Scania	0

Source of information: and

=== Team championship ===
Rank	Team	Drivers	Trucks	Points
1	(Germany) (Spain) Truck Sport Lutz Bernau	(Spain) Antonio Albacete, (Switzerland) Markus Bösiger	MAN	621
2	(Czech Republic) Buggyra International Racing System	(Czech Republic) Adam Lacko, (Czech Republic) David Vršecký	Freightliner	576
3	(Germany) Team Reinert Adventure	(Germany) Jochen Hahn, (Germany) René Reinert	MAN	533
4	(Hungary) OXXO Energy Truck Race Team	(Hungary) Norbert Kiss, (Hungary) Benedek Major	MAN	459
5	(France) (Germany) Truckdrive-JRT	(France) Anthony Janiec, (Germany) Ellen Lohr	MAN	94
6	(France) Lion Truck Racing	(Germany) Stephanie Halm, (Spain) Javier Mariezcurrena	MAN	89
7	(Portugal) VTR-SM/Europart Racing	(Portugal) José Rodrigues, (Portugal) José Teodosio	Renault	70
8	(Germany) Team Tankpool 24 Racing	(Germany) André Kursim, (France) Dominique Orsini	Mercedes-Benz	5

Source of data:

== Bibliography ==
- Göttl, Thomas Paul (2014). Truck Sport Book 2014 (in English and German). Stuttgart: Motorbuch Verlag. ISBN 978-3-613-30771-1.
