= 2013 European Truck Racing Championship =

Seasons
- ← 2012 2014 →

The 2013 FIA European Truck Racing Championship was a motor-racing championship using highly tuned tractor units producing over 1000 bhp. It was the 29th year of the championship and Jochen Hahn won the title for the third year in a row with MAN.

Since Heinz-Werner Lenz, who between 1997 and 1999 won the Race-Trucks Class title at three consecutive years on his Mercedes-Benz 1938-S, and for the first time since the Super-Race-Truck Class was abolished prior to the opening of the 2006 season, Jochen Hahn is the first truck racer to win the title hat-trick on his Castrol Team Hahn Racing MAN race truck.

In 1988, 1989 and 1990, Curt Göransson was the first one to achieve such a success by winning three Class B titles in a row on his Volvo N12 race truck.

== Teams and drivers ==
No.	Driver	Team	Manufacturer	Rounds
1	(Germany) Jochen Hahn	Castrol Team Hahn Racing	MAN	All
2	(Spain) Antonio Albacete	Equipo Cepsa	MAN	All
3	(Czech Republic) Adam Lacko	MKR Technology	Renault	All
4	(Germany) Markus Östreich	Truck Sport Lutz Bernau	MAN	All
6	(Switzerland) Markus Bösiger	MKR Technology	Renault	All
7	(Finland) Mika Mäkinen	Mad Croc Racing, Castrol Team Hahn Racing	MAN	All
9	(France) Anthony Janiec	Team 14	Renault	1–5, 7-10
10	(Hungary) Norbert Kiss	OXXO Energy Truck Race Team	MAN	All
12	(Hungary) Benedek Major	OXXO Energy Truck Race Team	MAN	All
14	(Belgium) Jean-Pierre Blaise	2CVRT	Renault	1-5, 7-10
15	(Netherlands) Erwin Kleinnagelvoort	EK-truckrace	Scania	2-5, 7-10
18	(France) Jérémy Robineau	Robineau Competition	MAN	1-3, 5, 8-10
19	(France) Florian Orsini	Team Orsini	Mercedes-Benz	2-3, 7-10
19	(France) Dominique Orsini	Team Orsini	Mercedes-Benz	1, 4-5
21	(Czech Republic) Frankie Vojtíšek	Frankie Truck Racing Team	MAN	1-5, 7-10
22	(Poland) Gregory Ostaszewski	Frankie Truck Racing Team	MAN	1-3, 5, 7, 10
23	(Portugal) José Fernandes Teodosio	Vitry Truck Racing	Renault	All
24	(Germany) Ellen Lohr	Tankpool 24 Racing	Mercedes-Benz	1, 3-5, 7-8
24	(Germany) Andre Kursim	Tankpool 24 Racing	Mercedes-Benz	9-10
25	(Russia) Iurii Egorov	Red Ice Racing	Freightliner	1-3, 5-6
25	(Czech Republic) Michal Matějovský	Red Ice Racing	Freightliner	7
25	(Germany) Ellen Lohr	Red Ice Racing	Freightliner	9-10
33	(Czech Republic) David Vršecký	Buggyra Int. Racing System	Freightliner	All
44	(Germany) Steffi Halm	Lion Truck Racing	MAN	1-2, 4-5, 7, 9
77	(Germany) René Reinert	Reinert Racing	MAN	All

Race drivers without fixed number, whose number is defined race by race:

No.	Driver	Team	Manufacturer	Rounds
20	(Spain) Javier Mariezcurrena	Javier Mariezcurrena	MAN	2-3, 9-10
26	(Spain) Orlando Rodriguez	Orlando Rodriguez	Mercedes-Benz	2, 9
27	(Germany) Gerd Körber	Team Schwaben-Truck	Iveco	1, 5, 7, 10
28	(Austria) Markus Altenstrasser	Team Schwaben-Truck	Iveco	4,5
29	(Spain) David Felipe Plaza	Racing Truck La Roda	MAN	2, 9
30	(Spain) Enrique Vila	Alvi Truck Sports	Mercedes-Benz	2, 9
31	(Spain) Alberto Vila	Alvi Truck Sports	Mercedes-Benz	2, 9
32	(Spain) Pedro Ignacio García	Pedro Ignacio García	Iveco	2, 9
34	(Spain) David Marco Bermejo	David Marco Bermejo	MAN	2, 9
35	(Germany) Sascha Lenz	S.L. Truck Racing Team	Mercedes-Benz	5
36	(Germany) Heinz-Werner Lenz	S.L. Truck Racing Team	Mercedes-Benz	5
37	(Portugal) Eduardo Rodrigues	Reboconort Racing Truck Team	MAN	9
38	(Portugal) José Rodrigues	Reboconort Racing Truck Team	MAN	9

== Calendar and winners ==
Round		Circuit	Date	Pole position	Fastest lap	Winning driver	Winning team
1	R1	(Italy) Misano World Circuit	May 18–19	(Germany) Jochen Hahn		(Germany) Jochen Hahn	(Germany) Castrol Team Hahn Racing
1	R2	(Italy) Misano World Circuit	May 18–19			(Finland) Mika Mäkinen	(Germany) Mad Croc Racing, Castrol Team Hahn Racing
1	R3	(Italy) Misano World Circuit	May 18–19	(Hungary) Norbert Kiss		(Spain) Antonio Albacete	(Spain) Equipo Cepsa
1	R4	(Italy) Misano World Circuit	May 18–19			(Finland) Mika Mäkinen	(Germany) Mad Croc Racing, Castrol Team Hahn Racing
2	R1	(Spain) Circuito de Navarra	June 1–2	(Hungary) Norbert Kiss		(Germany) Markus Oestreich	(Germany) Truck Sport Lutz Bernau
2	R2	(Spain) Circuito de Navarra	June 1–2			(Czech Republic) Adam Lacko	(Czech Republic) MKR Technology
2	R3	(Spain) Circuito de Navarra	June 1–2	(Spain) Antonio Albacete		(Spain) Antonio Albacete	(Spain) Equipo Cepsa
2	R4	(Spain) Circuito de Navarra	June 1–2			(Switzerland) Markus Bösiger	(Czech Republic) MKR Technology
3	R1	(France) Circuit Paul Armagnac	June 15–16	(Spain) Antonio Albacete		(Spain) Antonio Albacete	(Spain) Equipo Cepsa
3	R2	(France) Circuit Paul Armagnac	June 15–16			(Hungary) Benedek Major	(Hungary) OXXO Energy Truck Race Team
3	R3	(France) Circuit Paul Armagnac	June 15–16	(Spain) Antonio Albacete		(Spain) Antonio Albacete	(Spain) Equipo Cepsa
3	R4	(France) Circuit Paul Armagnac	June 15–16			(Switzerland) Markus Bösiger	(Czech Republic) MKR Technology
4	R1	(Austria) Red Bull Ring	July 6–7	(Spain) Antonio Albacete		(Spain) Antonio Albacete	(Spain) Equipo Cepsa
4	R2	(Austria) Red Bull Ring	July 6–7			(Czech Republic) Adam Lacko	(Czech Republic) MKR Technology
4	R3	(Austria) Red Bull Ring	July 6–7	(Germany) Markus Oestreich		(Germany) Markus Oestreich	(Germany) Truck Sport Lutz Bernau
4	R4	(Austria) Red Bull Ring	July 6–7			(Czech Republic) David Vršecký	(Czech Republic) Buggyra Int. Racing System
5	R1	(Germany) Nürburgring	July 12–14	(Spain) Antonio Albacete		(Germany) Jochen Hahn	(Germany) Castrol Team Hahn Racing
5	R2	(Germany) Nürburgring	July 12–14			(Czech Republic) Adam Lacko	(Czech Republic) MKR Technology
5	R3	(Germany) Nürburgring	July 12–14	(Spain) Antonio Albacete		(Spain) Antonio Albacete	(Spain) Equipo Cepsa
5	R4	(Germany) Nürburgring	July 12–14			(Hungary) Norbert Kiss	(Czech Republic) OXXO Energy Truck Race Team
6	R1	(Russia) Smolensk Ring	July 27–28	(Spain) Antonio Albacete		(Hungary) Norbert Kiss	(Czech Republic) OXXO Energy Truck Race Team
6	R2	(Russia) Smolensk Ring	July 27–28			(Switzerland) Markus Bösiger	(Czech Republic) MKR Technology
6	R3	(Russia) Smolensk Ring	July 27–28	(Spain) Antonio Albacete		(Spain) Antonio Albacete	(Spain) Equipo Cepsa
6	R4	(Russia) Smolensk Ring	July 27–28			(Finland) Mika Mäkinen	(Germany) Mad Croc Racing, Castrol Team Hahn Racing
7	R1	(Czech Republic) Autodrom Most	August 31 - September 1	(Germany) Jochen Hahn		(Germany) Jochen Hahn	(Germany) Castrol Team Hahn Racing
7	R2	(Czech Republic) Autodrom Most	August 31 - September 1			(Hungary) Benedek Major	(Hungary) OXXO Energy Truck Race Team
7	R3	(Czech Republic) Autodrom Most	August 31 - September 1	(Germany) Jochen Hahn		(Germany) Jochen Hahn	(Germany) Castrol Team Hahn Racing
7	R4	(Czech Republic) Autodrom Most	August 31 - September 1			(Czech Republic) David Vršecký	(Czech Republic) Buggyra Int. Racing System
8	R1	(Belgium) Circuit Zolder	September 21–22	(Hungary) Norbert Kiss		(Spain) Antonio Albacete	(Spain) Equipo Cepsa
8	R2	(Belgium) Circuit Zolder	September 21–22			(Germany) Jochen Hahn	(Germany) Castrol Team Hahn Racing
8	R3	(Belgium) Circuit Zolder	September 21–22	(Czech Republic) David Vršecký		(Czech Republic) David Vršecký	(Czech Republic) Buggyra Int. Racing System
8	R4	(Belgium) Circuit Zolder	September 21–22			(Switzerland) Markus Bösiger	(Czech Republic) MKR Technology
9	R1	(Spain) Circuito del Jarama	October 5–6	(Germany) Markus Oestreich		(Spain) Antonio Albacete	(Spain) Equipo Cepsa
9	R2	(Spain) Circuito del Jarama	October 5–6			(Germany) Markus Oestreich	(Germany) Truck Sport Lutz Bernau
9	R3	(Spain) Circuito del Jarama	October 5–6	(Hungary) Norbert Kiss		(Germany) Jochen Hahn	(Germany) Castrol Team Hahn Racing
9	R4	(Spain) Circuito del Jarama	October 5–6			(Hungary) Benedek Major	(Hungary) OXXO Energy Truck Race Team
10	R1	(France) Bugatti Circuit	October 12–13	(Hungary) Norbert Kiss		(Germany) Jochen Hahn	(Germany) Castrol Team Hahn Racing
10	R2	(France) Bugatti Circuit	October 12–13			(Switzerland) Markus Bösiger	(Czech Republic) MKR Technology
10	R3	(France) Bugatti Circuit	October 12–13	(Hungary) Norbert Kiss		(Germany) Jochen Hahn	(Germany) Castrol Team Hahn Racing
10	R4	(France) Bugatti Circuit	October 12–13			(Hungary) Benedek Major	(Hungary) OXXO Energy Truck Race Team

== Championship overall standings ==
=== Drivers' championship ===
Each round or racing event consisted of four races. At the races 1 and 3, the points awarded according to the ranking was on a 20, 15, 12, 10, 8, 6, 4, 3, 2, 1 basis to the top 10 finishers – at the races 2 and 4 with reversed grid, the points awarded were 10, 9, 8, 7, 6, 5, 4, 3, 2, 1 (rank 1 - 10) respectively.

Rank	Driver	Truck	Points
1	(Germany) Jochen Hahn	MAN	417
2	(Spain) Antonio Albacete	MAN	412
3	(Germany) Markus Oestreich	MAN	316
4	(Hungary) Norbert Kiss	MAN	301
5	(Czech Republic) David Vršecký	Freightliner	294
6	(Czech Republic) Adam Lacko	Renault	227
7	(Switzerland) Markus Bösiger	Renault	201
8	(Finland) Mika Mäkinen	MAN	155
9	(Germany) René Reinert	MAN	108
10	(Hungary) Benedek Major	MAN	91

Rank	Driver	Points
11	(France) Anthony Janiec	65
12	(Czech Republic) Frankie Vojtíšek	32
13	(Germany) Gerd Körber	24
14	(Belgium) Jean-Pierre Blaise	23
15	(Germany) Stephanie Halm	16
	(Germany) Javier Mariezcurrena	16
17	(France) Jeremy Robineau	13
18	(Russia) Iurii Egorov	4
19	(Austria) Markus Altenstrasser	3
20	(Portugal) José Fernandes Teodosio	2

Rank	Driver	Points
21	(Spain) David Felipe Plaza	o
22	(Spain) Pedro Ignacio García	0
23	(Netherlands) Erwin Kleinnagelvoort	0
24	(Germany) Heinz-Werner Lenz	0
25	(Germany) Sascha Lenz	0
26	(Germany) Ellen Lohr	0
27	(Spain) David Marco Bermejo	0
28	(Czech Republic) Michal Matějovský	0
29	(France) Dominique Orsini	0
30	(France) Florian Orsini	0

Rank	Driver	Points
31	(Poland) Gregory Ostaszewski	0
32	(Spain) Orlando Rodriguez	0
33	(Spain) Alberto Vila	0
34	(Spain) Enrique Vila	0

Source of information: and

=== Team championship ===
Rank	Team	Drivers	Trucks	Points
1	(Germany) (Spain) Truck Sport Lutz Bernau	(Spain) Antonio Albacete, (Germany) Markus Oestreich	MAN	777
2	(Germany) Castrol Team Hahn Racing	(Germany) Jochen Hahn, (Finland) Mika Mäkinen	MAN	630
3	(Czech Republic) MKR Technology	(Czech Republic) Adam Lacko, (Switzerland) Markus Bösiger	Renault	503
4	(Hungary) OXXO Energy Truck Race Team	(Hungary) Norbert Kiss, (Hungary) Benedek Major	MAN	457
5	(France) (Belgium) Team Blaise Janiec	(France) Anthony Janiec, (Belgium) Jean-Pierre Blaise	Renault	168
6	(France) Lion Truck Racing	(France) Jérémy Robineau, (Germany) Steffi Halm	MAN	83
7	(Czech Republic) Frankie Truck Racing Team	(Czech Republic) Frankie Vojtíšek, (Poland) Gregory Ostaszewski	MAN	65
8	(Germany) Tankpool 24 Racing	(France) Dominique Orsini, (France) Florian Orsini, Kursim	Mercedes-Benz	10

Source of data:

== Bibliography ==
- Göttl, Thomas Paul (2013). Truck Sport Book 2013 (in English and German). Stuttgart: Motorbuch Verlag. ISBN 978-3-613-30744-5.
