= 2023 European Truck Racing Championship =

The 2023 European Truck Racing Championship, also known as the Goodyear European Truck Racing Championship for sponsorship reasons, will be a motor-racing championship using highly tuned tractor units. It is the 39th year of the championship. A nine-round season was announced on 7 December 2022, with the season beginning on 20 May at the Misano World Circuit Marco Simoncelli and ending on 1 October at the Circuito del Jarama. The season was shortened to eight rounds pre-season due to construction work at the Hungaroring.

== Schedule ==
A nine-round season was announced on 7 December 2022. All venues from the 2022 season were initially slated to return. Additionally, a new event at Tor Poznań in Poland was added for 2023.

On 11 April, the series announced that the scheduled round in Hungary at the Hungaroring was cancelled due to reconstruction work occurring at the venue, dropping the season to eight events.

Round		Circuit	Date
1	R1	(Italy) Misano World Circuit Marco Simoncelli, Misano Adriatico	20 May
1	R2	(Italy) Misano World Circuit Marco Simoncelli, Misano Adriatico	20 May
1	R3	(Italy) Misano World Circuit Marco Simoncelli, Misano Adriatico	21 May
1	R4	(Italy) Misano World Circuit Marco Simoncelli, Misano Adriatico	21 May
2	R1	Slovakia Ring, Orechová Potôň	10 June
2	R2	Slovakia Ring, Orechová Potôň	10 June
2	R3	Slovakia Ring, Orechová Potôň	11 June
2	R4	Slovakia Ring, Orechová Potôň	11 June
3	R1	(Poland) Tor Poznań, Poznań	24 June
3	R2	(Poland) Tor Poznań, Poznań	24 June
3	R3	(Poland) Tor Poznań, Poznań	25 June
3	R4	(Poland) Tor Poznań, Poznań	25 June
4	R1	(Germany) Nürburgring, Nürburg	15 July
4	R2	(Germany) Nürburgring, Nürburg	15 July
4	R3	(Germany) Nürburgring, Nürburg	16 July
4	R4	(Germany) Nürburgring, Nürburg	16 July
5	R1	(Czech Republic) Autodrom Most, Most	26 August
5	R2	(Czech Republic) Autodrom Most, Most	26 August
5	R3	(Czech Republic) Autodrom Most, Most	27 August
5	R4	(Czech Republic) Autodrom Most, Most	27 August
6	R1	(Belgium) Circuit Zolder, Heusden-Zolder	9 September
6	R2	(Belgium) Circuit Zolder, Heusden-Zolder	9 September
6	R3	(Belgium) Circuit Zolder, Heusden-Zolder	10 September
6	R4	(Belgium) Circuit Zolder, Heusden-Zolder	10 September
7	R1	(France) Bugatti Circuit, Le Mans	23 September
7	R2	(France) Bugatti Circuit, Le Mans	23 September
7	R3	(France) Bugatti Circuit, Le Mans	24 September
7	R4	(France) Bugatti Circuit, Le Mans	24 September
8	R1	(Spain) Circuito del Jarama, San Sebastián de los Reyes	30 September
8	R2	(Spain) Circuito del Jarama, San Sebastián de los Reyes	30 September
8	R3	(Spain) Circuito del Jarama, San Sebastián de los Reyes	1 October
8	R4	(Spain) Circuito del Jarama, San Sebastián de los Reyes	1 October

== Teams and drivers ==
The full season entry list was released on 1 May. Race-by-race entries will be announced throughout the season.

The following table lists all teams and drivers to compete in the 2023 championship.

Team	Manufacturer	No.	Drivers	Rounds	Class
(United Kingdom) Anderson Racing	MAN	33	(United Kingdom) Jamie Anderson	2–8	
(Czech Republic) Buggyra ZM Racing	Freightliner	55	(Czech Republic) Adam Lacko	5	
(Germany) Don't Touch Racing	Iveco	11	(Germany) André Kursim	All	
(Netherlands) Erwin Kleinnagelvoort	Scania	15	(Netherlands) Erwin Kleinnagelvoort	4	G
(Germany) Hecker Racing	Scania	25	(Germany) Heinrich Clemens-Hecker	1, 3–8	G
(France) Lion Truck Racing	MAN	66	(France) Jonathan André	1, 3, 6, 8	G
(Spain) Luis Recuenco	Iveco	64	(Spain) Luis Recuenco	All	G
(United Kingdom) NWT Motorsport	MAN	18	(United Kingdom) John Newell	All	G
(Portugal) Reboconorte Racing Truck Team	MAN	14	(Portugal) José Rodrigues	7–8	
(Portugal) Reboconorte Racing Truck Team	MAN	38	(Portugal) José Eduardo Rodrigues	All	G
(Hungary) Révész Racing	MAN	1	(Hungary) Norbert Kiss	All	
(Germany) SL Apollo Tyres Trucksport	MAN	3	(Germany) Sascha Lenz	All	
(Germany) T Sport Bernau	MAN	23	(Spain) Antonio Albacete	All	
(Germany) Tankpool 24 Racing	Scania	24	(Germany) Steffen Faas	All	G
(United Kingdom) Taylors Trucksport Racing	MAN	81	(United Kingdom) Mark Taylor	All	G
(Germany) Team Hahn Racing	Iveco	2	(Germany) Jochen Hahn	All	
(Germany) Team Hahn Racing	Iveco	22	(Germany) Lukas Hahn	3–5	G
(Germany) Team Schwabentruck	Iveco	44	(Germany) Stephanie Halm	All	

Icon	Class
G	Goodyear Cup

== Results and standings ==
=== Season summary ===
Round		Circuit	Pole position	Fastest lap	Winning driver	Winning team	Goodyear Cup winner
1	R1	(Italy) Misano World Circuit Marco Simoncelli, Misano Adriatico	(Hungary) Norbert Kiss	(Germany) Jochen Hahn	(Germany) Jochen Hahn	(Germany) Team Hahn Racing	(Portugal) José Eduardo Rodrigues
1	R2	(Italy) Misano World Circuit Marco Simoncelli, Misano Adriatico		(Hungary) Norbert Kiss	(Hungary) Norbert Kiss	(Hungary) Révész Racing	(Germany) Steffen Faas
1	R3	(Italy) Misano World Circuit Marco Simoncelli, Misano Adriatico	(Hungary) Norbert Kiss	(Hungary) Norbert Kiss	(Hungary) Norbert Kiss	(Hungary) Révész Racing	(Portugal) José Eduardo Rodrigues
1	R4	(Italy) Misano World Circuit Marco Simoncelli, Misano Adriatico		(Germany) Sascha Lenz	(Spain) Antonio Albacete	(Germany) T Sport Bernau	(Portugal) José Eduardo Rodrigues
2	R1	Slovakia Ring, Orechová Potôň	(Hungary) Norbert Kiss	(Hungary) Norbert Kiss	(Hungary) Norbert Kiss	(Hungary) Révész Racing	(Portugal) José Eduardo Rodrigues
2	R2	Slovakia Ring, Orechová Potôň		(Germany) Jochen Hahn	(Hungary) Norbert Kiss	(Hungary) Révész Racing	(Portugal) José Eduardo Rodrigues
2	R3	Slovakia Ring, Orechová Potôň	(Hungary) Norbert Kiss	(Hungary) Norbert Kiss	(Hungary) Norbert Kiss	(Hungary) Révész Racing	(Germany) Steffen Faas
2	R4	Slovakia Ring, Orechová Potôň		(Hungary) Norbert Kiss	(Hungary) Norbert Kiss	(Hungary) Révész Racing	(Germany) Steffen Faas
3	R1	(Poland) Tor Poznań, Poznań	(Hungary) Norbert Kiss	(Hungary) Norbert Kiss	(Hungary) Norbert Kiss	(Hungary) Révész Racing	(Portugal) José Eduardo Rodrigues
3	R2	(Poland) Tor Poznań, Poznań		(Hungary) Norbert Kiss	(Germany) Lukas Hahn	(Germany) Team Hahn Racing	(Germany) Lukas Hahn
3	R3	(Poland) Tor Poznań, Poznań	(Hungary) Norbert Kiss	(Hungary) Norbert Kiss	(Hungary) Norbert Kiss	(Hungary) Révész Racing	(Germany) Lukas Hahn
3	R4	(Poland) Tor Poznań, Poznań		(Spain) Antonio Albacete	(Spain) Antonio Albacete	(Germany) T Sport Bernau	(Germany) Lukas Hahn
4	R1	(Germany) Nürburgring, Nürburg	(Hungary) Norbert Kiss	(Hungary) Norbert Kiss	(Hungary) Norbert Kiss	(Hungary) Révész Racing	(Germany) Lukas Hahn
4	R2	(Germany) Nürburgring, Nürburg		(Hungary) Norbert Kiss	(Hungary) Norbert Kiss	(Hungary) Révész Racing	(Germany) Steffen Faas
4	R3	(Germany) Nürburgring, Nürburg	(Hungary) Norbert Kiss	(Hungary) Norbert Kiss	(Hungary) Norbert Kiss	(Hungary) Révész Racing	(Germany) Lukas Hahn
4	R4	(Germany) Nürburgring, Nürburg		(Hungary) Norbert Kiss	(Germany) Jochen Hahn	(Germany) Team Hahn Racing	(Germany) Lukas Hahn
5	R1	(Czech Republic) Autodrom Most, Most	(Hungary) Norbert Kiss	(Hungary) Norbert Kiss	(Hungary) Norbert Kiss	(Hungary) Révész Racing	(Germany) Lukas Hahn
5	R2	(Czech Republic) Autodrom Most, Most		(Hungary) Norbert Kiss	(Czech Republic) Adam Lacko	(Czech Republic) Buggyra ZM Racing	(Portugal) José Eduardo Rodrigues
5	R3	(Czech Republic) Autodrom Most, Most	(Hungary) Norbert Kiss	(Hungary) Norbert Kiss	(Hungary) Norbert Kiss	(Hungary) Révész Racing	(Germany) Lukas Hahn
5	R4	(Czech Republic) Autodrom Most, Most		(Hungary) Norbert Kiss	(Hungary) Norbert Kiss	(Hungary) Révész Racing	(Germany) Lukas Hahn
6	R1	(Belgium) Circuit Zolder, Heusden-Zolder	(Hungary) Norbert Kiss	(Hungary) Norbert Kiss	(Germany) Jochen Hahn	(Germany) Team Hahn Racing	(Portugal) José Eduardo Rodrigues
6	R2	(Belgium) Circuit Zolder, Heusden-Zolder		(Hungary) Norbert Kiss	(Hungary) Norbert Kiss	(Hungary) Révész Racing	(Portugal) José Eduardo Rodrigues
6	R3	(Belgium) Circuit Zolder, Heusden-Zolder	(Hungary) Norbert Kiss	(Hungary) Norbert Kiss	(Hungary) Norbert Kiss	(Hungary) Révész Racing	(Portugal) José Eduardo Rodrigues
6	R4	(Belgium) Circuit Zolder, Heusden-Zolder		(Hungary) Norbert Kiss	(Hungary) Norbert Kiss	(Hungary) Révész Racing	(Portugal) José Eduardo Rodrigues
7	R1	(France) Bugatti Circuit, Le Mans	(Hungary) Norbert Kiss	(Hungary) Norbert Kiss	(Hungary) Norbert Kiss	(Hungary) Révész Racing	(Portugal) José Eduardo Rodrigues
7	R2	(France) Bugatti Circuit, Le Mans		(Hungary) Norbert Kiss	(United Kingdom) Jamie Anderson	(United Kingdom) Anderson Racing	(Portugal) José Eduardo Rodrigues
7	R3	(France) Bugatti Circuit, Le Mans	(Hungary) Norbert Kiss	(Hungary) Norbert Kiss	(Hungary) Norbert Kiss	(Hungary) Révész Racing	(Spain) Luis Recuenco
7	R4	(France) Bugatti Circuit, Le Mans		(Germany) Sascha Lenz	(Spain) Luis Recuenco	(Spain) Luis Recuenco	(Spain) Luis Recuenco
8	R1	(Spain) Circuito del Jarama, San Sebastián de los Reyes	(Hungary) Norbert Kiss	(Hungary) Norbert Kiss	(Hungary) Norbert Kiss	(Hungary) Révész Racing	(Spain) Luis Recuenco
8	R2	(Spain) Circuito del Jarama, San Sebastián de los Reyes		(Hungary) Norbert Kiss	(Hungary) Norbert Kiss	(Hungary) Révész Racing	(Spain) Luis Recuenco
8	R3	(Spain) Circuito del Jarama, San Sebastián de los Reyes	(Hungary) Norbert Kiss	(Hungary) Norbert Kiss	(Hungary) Norbert Kiss	(Hungary) Révész Racing	(Spain) Luis Recuenco
8	R4	(Spain) Circuito del Jarama, San Sebastián de los Reyes		(Hungary) Norbert Kiss	(Germany) André Kursim	(Germany) Don't Touch Racing	(Spain) Luis Recuenco

=== Drivers standings ===
At each race, points are awarded to the top ten classified finishers using the following structure:

Position	**1st**	**2nd**	**3rd**	**4th**	**5th**	**6th**	**7th**	**8th**	**9th**	**10th**
Points (races 1 and 3)	20	15	12	10	8	6	4	3	2	1
Points (races 2 and 4)	10	9	8	7	6	5	4	3	2	1

Pos.	Driver	MIS (Italy)				SVK (Slovakia)				POZ (Poland)				NUR (Germany)				MOS (Czech Republic)				ZOL (Belgium)				LMS (France)				JAR (Spain)				Pts.
1	(Hungary) Norbert Kiss	**Ret**	1	**1**	5	**1**	1	**1**	1	**1**	5	**1**	3	**1**	1	**1**	2	**1**	4	**1**	1	**Ret**	1	**1**	1	**1**	3	**1**	4	**1**	1	**1**	3	419
2	(Germany) Jochen Hahn	1	5	3	4	4	2	5	2	2	4	2	9	2	11	4	1	3	8	3	5	1	4	3	2	2	6	3	2	3	7	2	5	314
3	(Germany) Sascha Lenz	5	2	2	12	3	6	2	7	3	9	3	2	4	2	2	4	5	7	4	3	2	Ret	2	6	13	5	2	5	4	4	3	2	274
4	(Spain) Antonio Albacete	2	3	6	1	2	5	3	4	5	Ret	7	1	3	5	3	Ret	2	5	5	7	5	2	4	5	4	2	4	3	2	8	4	4	269
5	(Germany) Stephanie Halm	11	DNS	4	7	5	8	Ret	5	7	2	5	5	6	3	5	Ret	7	2	8	2	4	9	Ret	7	3	4	6	Ret	5	3	13	Ret	169
6	(Germany) André Kursim	3	6	5	9	7	3	4	3	9	6	4	8	8	4	7	5	12	DSQ	6	6	6	3	7	8	7	8	7	Ret	7	2	6	1	162
7	(United Kingdom) Jamie Anderson					6	4	9	6	4	3	9	7	5	7	8	3	4	3	9	8	Ret	6	5	4	5	1	5	9	Ret	9	5	7	152
8	(Portugal) José Eduardo Rodrigues	4	7	7	2	8	7	10	9	6	10	10	10	Ret	9	11	8	9	6	14	11	3	5	6	3	6	7	13	7	10	10	14	12	106
9	(Germany) Steffen Faas	6	4	8	3	10	9	6	8	Ret	11	11	12	9	6	10	7	11	9	12	10	7	12	8	Ret	8	9	9	12	12	Ret	9	9	69
10	(Germany) Lukas Hahn									8	1	6	4	7	8	6	6	6	10	7	4													62
11	(Spain) Luis Recuenco	10	10	Ret	DNS	9	11	8	12	11	13	14	Ret	13	14	Ret	13	13	13	13	13	10	10	12	DNS	10	12	8	1	8	6	8	8	37
12	(United Kingdom) Mark Taylor	Ret	9	11	10	12	12	7	11	10	7	8	6	12	13	9	9	10	Ret	DNS	DNS	DSQ	8	10	11	11	Ret	11	6	Ret	Ret	11	13	34
13	(Czech Republic) Adam Lacko																	8	1	2	Ret													28
14	(United Kingdom) John Newell	8	DSQ	9	6	11	10	11	10	13	8	12	11	Ret	12	13	11	15	11	11	12	9	7	9	10	12	11	10	11	11	12	12	11	25
15	(Portugal) José Rodrigues																									DSQ	Ret	Ret	8	6	5	7	6	24
16	(Germany) Heinrich Clemens-Hecker	9	11	10	8					12	12	DNS	DNS	10	15	12	10	14	12	10	9	8	Ret	Ret	9	9	10	12	10	9	11	15	Ret	22
17	(France) Jonathan André	7	8	12	11					14	14	13	13									11	11	11	12					Ret	13	10	10	9
18	(Netherlands) Erwin Kleinnagelvoort													11	10	Ret	12																	1
Pos.	Driver	MIS (Italy)				SVK (Slovakia)				POZ (Poland)				NUR (Germany)				MOS (Czech Republic)				ZOL (Belgium)				LMS (France)				JAR (Spain)				Pts.

Colour	Result
Gold	Winner
Silver	Second place
Bronze	Third place
Green	Points classification
Blue	Non-points classification
Blue	Non-classified finish (NC)
Purple	Retired, not classified (Ret)
Red	Did not qualify (DNQ)
Red	Did not pre-qualify (DNPQ)
Black	Disqualified (DSQ)
White	Did not start (DNS)
White	Withdrew (WD)
White	Race cancelled (C)
Blank	Did not practice (DNP)
Blank	Did not arrive (DNA)
Blank	Excluded (EX)

**Bold** – Pole
Italics – Fastest Lap

== Bibliography ==
- Göttl, Thomas Paul; Trost, Oliver (2023). "Truck Race Spezial 2023". Fernfahrer (Special Edition) (in German). Stuttgart: ETM Verlag. ISSN 0257-3180.
