= 2015 European Truck Racing Championship =

Seasons
- ← 2014 2016 →

The 2015 FIA European Truck Racing Championship was a motor-racing championship using highly tuned tractor units. It was the 31st year of the championship and Norbert Kiss won the title for the second year in a row with MAN.

== Teams and drivers ==
| No. | Driver | Team | Manufacturer | Rounds |

Race drivers without fixed number, whose number is defined race by race:

| No. | Driver | Team | Manufacturer | Rounds |

== Calendar and winners ==
| Round | | Circuit | Date | Pole position | Fastest lap | Winning driver | Winning team |
|---|---|---|---|---|---|---|---|
| 1 | R1 | (Spain) Circuit Ricardo Tormo | 25–26 April | (Germany) Jochen Hahn | (Germany) Jochen Hahn | (Germany) Jochen Hahn | (Germany) Castrol Team Hahn Racing |
| 1 | R2 | (Spain) Circuit Ricardo Tormo | 25–26 April | | (Germany) Jochen Hahn | (Hungary) Norbert Kiss | (Hungary) OXXO Energy Truck Race Team |
| 1 | R3 | (Spain) Circuit Ricardo Tormo | 25–26 April | (Hungary) Norbert Kiss | (Hungary) Norbert Kiss | (Hungary) Norbert Kiss | (Hungary) OXXO Energy Truck Race Team |
| 1 | R4 | (Spain) Circuit Ricardo Tormo | 25–26 April | | (Czech Republic) David Vršecký | (Spain) Antonio Albacete | (Spain) Equipo Cepsa |
| 2 | R1 | (Austria) Red Bull Ring | 15-17 May | (Hungary) Norbert Kiss | (Hungary) Norbert Kiss | (Hungary) Norbert Kiss | (Hungary) OXXO Energy Truck Race Team |
| 2 | R2 | (Austria) Red Bull Ring | 15-17 May | | (Hungary) Norbert Kiss | (Hungary) Norbert Kiss | (Hungary) OXXO Energy Truck Race Team |
| 2 | R3 | (Austria) Red Bull Ring | 15-17 May | (Hungary) Norbert Kiss | (Hungary) Norbert Kiss | (Hungary) Norbert Kiss | (Hungary) OXXO Energy Truck Race Team |
| 2 | R4 | (Austria) Red Bull Ring | 15-17 May | | (Hungary) Norbert Kiss | (Hungary) Norbert Kiss | (Hungary) OXXO Energy Truck Race Team |
| 3 | R3 | (Italy) Misano World Circuit | 23–24 May | (Hungary) Norbert Kiss | (Czech Republic) Adam Lacko | (Germany) Jochen Hahn | (Germany) Castrol Team Hahn Racing |
| 3 | R2 | (Italy) Misano World Circuit | 23–24 May | | (Hungary) Norbert Kiss | (Hungary) Norbert Kiss | (Hungary) OXXO Energy Truck Race Team |
| 3 | R3 | (Italy) Misano World Circuit | 23–24 May | (Hungary) Norbert Kiss | (Hungary) Norbert Kiss | (Hungary) Norbert Kiss | (Hungary) OXXO Energy Truck Race Team |
| 3 | R4 | (Italy) Misano World Circuit | 23–24 May | | (Czech Republic) Adam Lacko | (Czech Republic) Adam Lacko | (Czech Republic) Buggyra International Racing System |
| 4 | R1 | (France) Circuit Paul Armagnac | 19–21 June | (Germany) Jochen Hahn | (Germany) Jochen Hahn | (Czech Republic) Adam Lacko | (Czech Republic) Buggyra International Racing System |
| 4 | R2 | (France) Circuit Paul Armagnac | 19–21 June | | (Hungary) Norbert Kiss | (Hungary) Norbert Kiss | (Hungary) OXXO Energy Truck Race Team |
| 4 | R3 | (France) Circuit Paul Armagnac | 19–21 June | (Hungary) Norbert Kiss | (Czech Republic) Adam Lacko | (Hungary) Norbert Kiss | (Hungary) OXXO Energy Truck Race Team |
| 4 | R4 | (France) Circuit Paul Armagnac | 19–21 June | | (Germany) Jochen Hahn | (France) Anthony Janiec | (Hungary) OXXO Energy Truck Race Team |
| 5 | R1 | (Germany) Nürburgring | 26–28 June | (Hungary) Norbert Kiss | (Germany) Jochen Hahn | (Hungary) Norbert Kiss | (Hungary) OXXO Energy Truck Race Team |
| 5 | R2 | (Germany) Nürburgring | 26–28 June | | (Spain) Antonio Albacete | (Spain) Antonio Albacete | (Spain) Equipo Cepsa |
| 5 | R3 | (Germany) Nürburgring | 26–28 June | (Hungary) Norbert Kiss | (Hungary) Norbert Kiss | (Hungary) Norbert Kiss | (Hungary) OXXO Energy Truck Race Team |
| 5 | R4 | (Germany) Nürburgring | 26–28 June | | (Czech Republic) Adam Lacko | (Czech Republic) Adam Lacko | (Czech Republic) Buggyra International Racing System |
| 6 | R1 | (Czech Republic) Autodrom Most | 28–30 August | (Hungary) Norbert Kiss | (Hungary) Norbert Kiss | (Hungary) Norbert Kiss | (Hungary) OXXO Energy Truck Race Team |
| 6 | R2 | (Czech Republic) Autodrom Most | 28–30 August | | (Czech Republic) Adam Lacko | (Czech Republic) David Vršecký | (Czech Republic) Buggyra International Racing System |
| 6 | R3 | (Czech Republic) Autodrom Most | 28–30 August | (Germany) Jochen Hahn | (Hungary) Norbert Kiss | (Germany) Jochen Hahn | (Germany) Castrol Team Hahn Racing |
| 6 | R4 | (Czech Republic) Autodrom Most | 28–30 August | | (Czech Republic) Adam Lacko | (Czech Republic) Adam Lacko | (Czech Republic) Buggyra International Racing System |
| 7 | R1 | (Hungary) Hungaroring | 4-6 September | (Hungary) Norbert Kiss | (Hungary) Norbert Kiss | (Hungary) Norbert Kiss | (Hungary) OXXO Energy Truck Race Team |
| 7 | R2 | (Hungary) Hungaroring | 4-6 September | | (Hungary) Norbert Kiss | (Germany) Stephanie Halm | (Germany) Reinert Racing GmbH |
| 7 | R3 | (Hungary) Hungaroring | 4-6 September | (Hungary) Norbert Kiss | (Hungary) Norbert Kiss | (Hungary) Norbert Kiss | (Hungary) OXXO Energy Truck Race Team |
| 7 | R4 | (Hungary) Hungaroring | 4-6 September | | (Hungary) Norbert Kiss | (Spain) Antonio Albacete | (Spain) Equipo Cepsa |
| 8 | R1 | (Belgium) Circuit Zolder | 19–20 September | (Hungary) Norbert Kiss | (Hungary) Norbert Kiss | (Hungary) Norbert Kiss | (Hungary) OXXO Energy Truck Race Team |
| 8 | R2 | (Belgium) Circuit Zolder | 19–20 September | | (Czech Republic) Adam Lacko | (Czech Republic) Adam Lacko | (Czech Republic) Buggyra International Racing System |
| 8 | R3 | (Belgium) Circuit Zolder | 19–20 September | (Hungary) Norbert Kiss | (Hungary) Norbert Kiss | (Hungary) Norbert Kiss | (Hungary) OXXO Energy Truck Race Team |
| 8 | R4 | (Belgium) Circuit Zolder | 19–20 September | | (Hungary) Norbert Kiss | (Czech Republic) David Vršecký | (Czech Republic) Buggyra International Racing System |
| 9 | R1 | (Spain) Circuito del Jarama | 3-4 October | (Hungary) Norbert Kiss | (Hungary) Norbert Kiss | (Hungary) Norbert Kiss | (Hungary) OXXO Energy Truck Race Team |
| 9 | R2 | (Spain) Circuito del Jarama | 3-4 October | | (Spain) Antonio Albacete | (Czech Republic) Adam Lacko | (Czech Republic) Buggyra International Racing System |
| 9 | R3 | (Spain) Circuito del Jarama | 3-4 October | (Hungary) Norbert Kiss | (Spain) Antonio Albacete | (Hungary) Norbert Kiss | (Hungary) OXXO Energy Truck Race Team |
| 9 | R4 | (Spain) Circuito del Jarama | 3-4 October | | (Hungary) Norbert Kiss | (Germany) Jochen Hahn | (Germany) Castrol Team Hahn Racing |
| 10 | R1 | (France) Bugatti Circuit | 10-11 October | (Hungary) Norbert Kiss | (Hungary) Norbert Kiss | (Spain) Antonio Albacete | (Spain) Equipo Cepsa |
| 10 | R2 | (France) Bugatti Circuit | 10-11 October | | (Hungary) Norbert Kiss | (Germany) René Reinert | (Germany) Reinert Racing GmbH |
| 10 | R3 | (France) Bugatti Circuit | 10-11 October | (Hungary) Norbert Kiss | (Spain) Antonio Albacete | (Spain) Antonio Albacete | (Spain) Equipo Cepsa |
| 10 | R4 | (France) Bugatti Circuit | 10-11 October | | (Spain) Antonio Albacete | (Germany) René Reinert | (Germany) Reinert Racing GmbH |

== Championship overall standings ==
=== Drivers' championship ===
Each round or racing event consisted of four races. At each race, the points awarded according to the ranking was on a 20, 15, 12, 10, 8, 6, 4, 3, 2, 1 basis to the top 10 finishers.

| Pos. | Driver | VAL (Spain) | | | | RBR (Austria) | | | | MIS (Italy) | | | | NOG (France) | | | | NUR (Germany) | | | | MOS (Czech Republic) | | | | HUN (Hungary) | | | | ZOL (Belgium) | | | | JAR (Spain) | | | | LMS (France) | | | | Pts. |
|---|---|---|---|---|---|---|---|---|---|---|---|---|---|---|---|---|---|---|---|---|---|---|---|---|---|---|---|---|---|---|---|---|---|---|---|---|---|---|---|---|---|---|
| 1 | (Hungary) Norbert Kiss | 2 | 1 | **1** | 4 | **1** | 1 | **1** | 1 | **3** | 1 | **1** | 3 | 7 | 1 | **1** | 5 | **1** | 5 | **1** | 4 | **1** | 4 | 2 | 4 | **1** | 3 | **1** | 2 | **1** | 3 | **1** | 2 | **1** | 3 | **1** | 11 | **3** | 3 | **2** | Ret | 599 |
| 2 | (Czech Republic) Adam Lacko | 3 | 3 | 2 | 5 | 2 | 5 | 2 | 5 | 2 | 2 | 3 | 1 | 1 | 4 | 2 | 7 | 2 | 6 | 8 | 1 | 3 | 2 | 8 | 1 | 2 | Ret | Ret | 5 | 2 | 1 | Ret | 13 | 7 | 1 | 3 | 3 | 2 | 5 | 3 | 5 | 447 |
| 3 | (Germany) Jochen Hahn | **1** | 7 | 3 | 2 | 3 | 2 | 3 | 6 | 1 | 5 | 2 | 5 | **2** | 6 | 3 | 2 | 3 | 4 | 5 | Ret | 2 | 8 | **1** | 3 | 3 | 4 | 2 | 4 | 7 | 2 | 3 | 6 | 3 | 4 | 7 | 1 | 5 | 2 | 6 | 11 | 434 |
| 4 | (Czech Republic) David Vrsecky | 4 | 4 | 4 | 3 | 4 | 4 | 4 | 4 | 5 | 4 | 6 | 2 | 4 | 5 | 5 | 9 | 4 | 3 | 2 | 3 | 8 | 1 | 6 | 2 | 4 | 2 | 4 | 3 | 4 | 4 | 7 | 1 | 8 | 2 | 4 | 5 | 4 | 6 | 4 | 4 | 405 |
| 5 | (Spain) Antonio Albacete | 5 | 5 | 6 | 1 | 5 | 6 | 6 | 3 | 4 | 6 | 4 | 4 | 3 | 3 | 4 | 6 | 8 | 1 | 3 | 6 | 4 | 6 | 3 | 12 | Ret | 9 | 7 | 1 | 3 | 5 | 2 | 5 | 2 | 5 | 2 | 4 | 1 | 8 | 1 | 6 | 385 |
| 6 | (Germany) René Reinert | 6 | 2 | 5 | 6 | 7 | Ret | 7 | 2 | Ret | Ret | 7 | 10 | 5 | 7 | 6 | 3 | 5 | 7 | 4 | 5 | 6 | 5 | 4 | 8 | 10 | 8 | 13 | 6 | 5 | 6 | 4 | 3 | 4 | 6 | 8 | 2 | 7 | 1 | 7 | 1 | 278 |
| 7 | (France) Anthony Janiec | 7 | 15 | Ret | 7 | 9 | 9 | 8 | 8 | 6 | 3 | 9 | 6 | 8 | 2 | 8 | 1 | 10 | 10 | 9 | 7 | 11 | 12 | 10 | 6 | 6 | 6 | 6 | 8 | 9 | 8 | 5 | 4 | 6 | 8 | 5 | 7 | 6 | 7 | 8 | 3 | 191 |
| 8 | (Germany) Stephanie Halm | | | | | | | | | | | | | 6 | 8 | 7 | 4 | 6 | 8 | 6 | Ret | 7 | 3 | 12 | 5 | 8 | 1 | 3 | 7 | | | | | 5 | 7 | 6 | 8 | 8 | 4 | 10 | 8 | 139 |
| 9 | (Germany) Gerd Körber | | | | | 6 | 3 | 5 | Ret | Ret | 7 | 5 | Ret | | | | | 7 | 2 | 7 | 2 | 5 | 7 | 5 | 10 | | | | | | | | | | | | | 9 | 9 | 5 | 2 | 124 |
| 10 | (Germany) Ellen Lohr | 8 | 6 | 7 | 8 | 11 | 8 | 9 | 7 | Ret | 8 | 15 | 9 | 9 | 9 | 9 | 8 | 9 | Ret | 11 | 8 | 10 | 10 | 7 | 7 | 7 | 5 | 5 | 9 | 6 | 7 | 6 | 8 | 10 | 10 | 9 | 9 | 10 | 10 | 9 | 7 | 109 |
| 11 | (Germany) Sascha Lenz | | | | | 15 | 11 | 12 | 11 | 9 | 13 | 14 | Ret | | | | | 11 | 13 | 12 | 9 | Ret | 11 | 13 | 14 | 9 | 10 | 9 | 11 | 8 | 12 | 9 | 9 | 9 | 9 | 10 | 6 | 11 | 11 | 11 | 10 | 28 |
| 12 | (Czech Republic) Frankie Vojtisek | | | | | | | | | | | | | | | | | 12 | 9 | 10 | 12 | 9 | 9 | Ret | 15 | 5 | 7 | 11 | 10 | | | | | 11 | 11 | Ret | 10 | 15 | 12 | 12 | 9 | 23 |
| 13 | (Netherlands) Erwin Kleinnagelvoort | 9 | 8 | 8 | 9 | | | | | | | | | 11 | 11 | Ret | 10 | 15 | 12 | 14 | 11 | 14 | 13 | 14 | 11 | 12 | 11 | 10 | 13 | 10 | 9 | 12 | 12 | 12 | 15 | 12 | 13 | 13 | 14 | 14 | 12 | 15 |
| 14 | (France) Jeremy Robineau | | | | | | | | | 8 | 12 | 11 | 8 | | | | | Ret | 11 | 13 | 14 | | | | | | | | | Ret | 11 | 8 | 7 | | | | | | | | | 13 |
| 15 | (Germany) Roland Rehfeld | | | | | 13 | Ret | Ret | Ret | 10 | 9 | 12 | Ret | | | | | 13 | Ret | Ret | 10 | 13 | Ret | 11 | 9 | 11 | 13 | 8 | 12 | Ret | 10 | 11 | 10 | | | | | | | | | 12 |
| 16 | (United Kingdom) Ryan Smith | | | | | 8 | 7 | 11 | 9 | | | | | 10 | 10 | 10 | Ret | | | | | | | | | | | | | | | | | | | | | | | | | 12 |
| 17 | (Portugal) José Rodrigues | | | | | | | | | 7 | Ret | 8 | 7 | | | | | | | | | | | | | | | | | | | | | 13 | 12 | 11 | 12 | | | | | 11 |
| 18 | (Portugal) Eduardo Rodrigues | 10 | 10 | 9 | 10 | 14 | 12 | 14 | 13 | 11 | Ret | 17 | 12 | 12 | 13 | 11 | 11 | 16 | 15 | Ret | 15 | | | | | | | | | | | | | | | | | | | | | 5 |
| 19 | (Austria) Markus Altenstrasser | | | | | 10 | 10 | 10 | 10 | | | | | | | | | | | | | | | | | | | | | | | | | | | | | | | | | 4 |
| 20 | (Portugal) Jose Teodosio | | | | | | | | | Ret | 10 | 10 | Ret | | | | | | | | | | | | | | | | | 11 | 13 | 10 | 14 | | | | | | | | | 3 |
| 21 | (Spain) David Felipe Plaza | 9 | 11 | Ret | 13 | | | | | | | | | | | | | | | | | | | | | | | | | | | | | 19 | 16 | Ret | Ret | | | | | 2 |
| 22 | (Spain) Pedro Garcia | 13 | 11 | 10 | 12 | | | | | | | | | 14 | 14 | 12 | Ret | | | | | | | | | | | | | | | | | 14 | 13 | 13 | 15 | | | | | 1 |
| 23 | (France) Michel Bassanelli | | | | | | | | | 13 | 15 | Ret | 14 | | | | | | | | | | | | | | | | | | | | | | | | | | | | | 0 |
| 24 | (Portugal) José de Sousa | | | | | | | | | 12 | 14 | 16 | Ret | | | | | | | | | | | | | | | | | 13 | Ret | 13 | Ret | | | | | | | | | 0 |
| 25 | (Germany) André Kursim | | | | | 12 | Ret | 13 | 12 | Ret | 11 | 13 | 11 | | | | | 14 | 14 | Ret | 13 | | | | | 13 | 12 | 12 | 14 | 12 | 14 | Ret | 11 | | | | | 12 | 13 | 13 | 13 | 0 |
| 26 | (Finland) Mika Mäkinen | | | | | | | | | | | | | | | | | | | | | | | | | | | | | | | | | | | | | 14 | 16 | 15 | 14 | 0 |
| 27 | (Spain) David Marco | 12 | 12 | 11 | 11 | | | | | | | | | 13 | 12 | Ret | 12 | | | | | | | | | | | | | | | | | 15 | 14 | 14 | 14 | | | | | 0 |
| 28 | (France) Florian Orsini | | | | | | | | | | | | | | | | | | | | | | | | | | | | | | | | | | | | | 16 | 15 | 16 | 15 | 0 |
| 29 | (Spain) Orlando Rodriguez | Ret | 13 | 13 | 14 | | | | | | | | | | | | | | | | | | | | | | | | | | | | | 18 | 19 | 17 | Ret | | | | | 0 |
| 30 | (France) Alain Treuvey | | | | | | | | | 14 | Ret | Ret | 13 | | | | | | | | | | | | | | | | | | | | | | | | | | | | | 0 |
| 31 | (Spain) Alberto Vila | 14 | 14 | 14 | Ret | | | | | | | | | | | | | | | | | | | | | | | | | | | | | 16 | 18 | 15 | 16 | | | | | 0 |
| 32 | (Spain) Enrique Vila | 15 | Ret | 12 | 15 | | | | | | | | | | | | | | | | | | | | | | | | | | | | | 17 | 17 | 16 | 17 | | | | | 0 |
| Pos. | Driver | VAL (Spain) | | | | RBR (Austria) | | | | MIS (Italy) | | | | NOG (France) | | | | NUR (Germany) | | | | MOS (Czech Republic) | | | | HUN (Hungary) | | | | ZOL (Belgium) | | | | JAR (Spain) | | | | LMS (France) | | | | Pts. |

| Colour | Result |
|---|---|
| Gold | Winner |
| Silver | Second place |
| Bronze | Third place |
| Green | Points classification |
| Blue | Non-points classification |
| Blue | Non-classified finish (NC) |
| Purple | Retired, not classified (Ret) |
| Red | Did not qualify (DNQ) |
| Red | Did not pre-qualify (DNPQ) |
| Black | Disqualified (DSQ) |
| White | Did not start (DNS) |
| White | Withdrew (WD) |
| White | Race cancelled (C) |
| Blank | Did not practice (DNP) |
| Blank | Did not arrive (DNA) |
| Blank | Excluded (EX) |

**Bold** – Pole
Italics – Fastest Lap

† – Drivers did not finish the race, but were classified as they completed over 75% of the race distance.

Source of information: and

== Bibliography ==
- Göttl, Thomas Paul (2015). Truck Sport Book 2015 (in English and German). Stuttgart: Motorbuch Verlag. ISBN 978-3-613-30799-5.
