= Norbert Kiss =

Hungarian racing driver

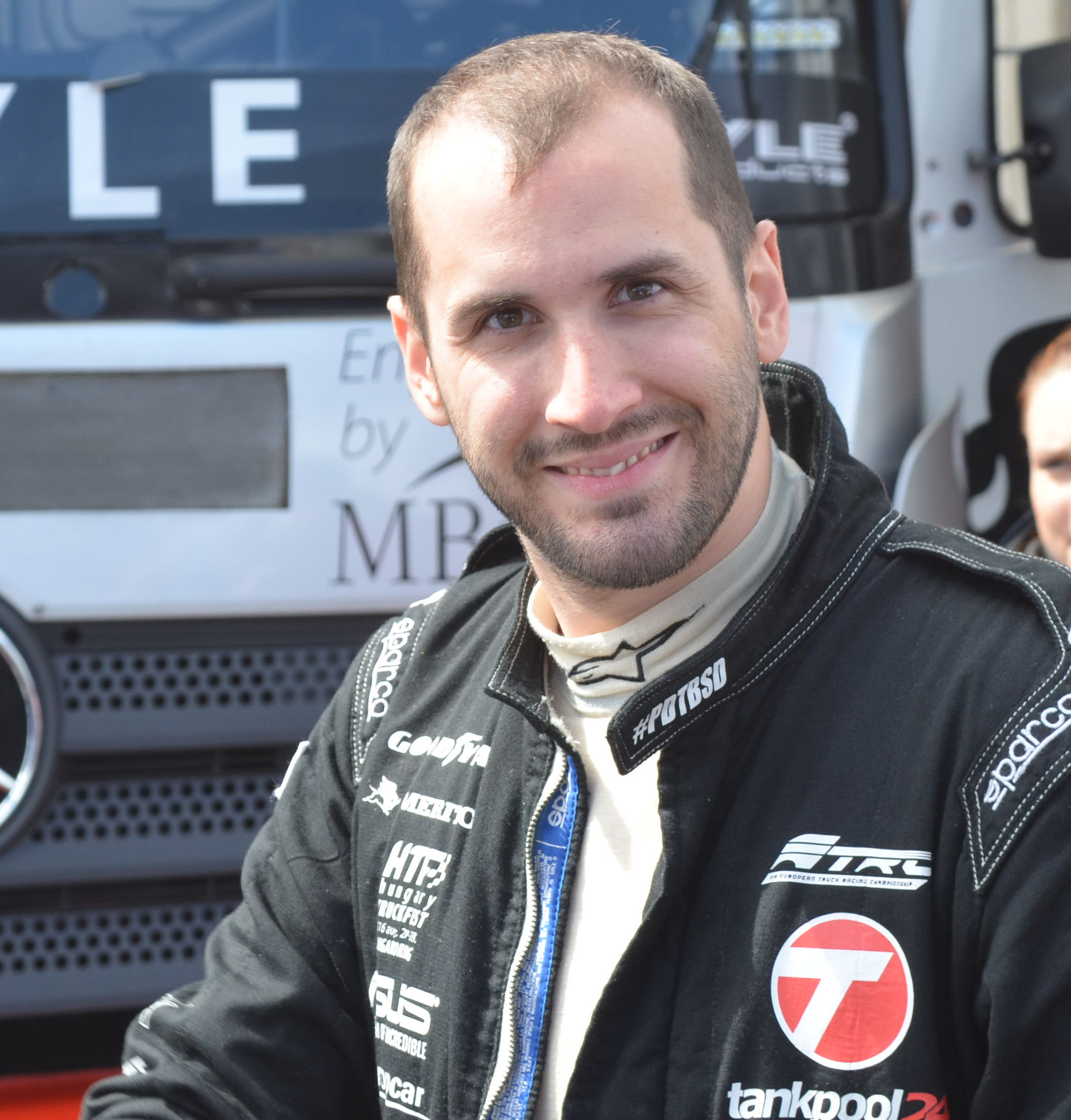
- Norbert Kiss in 2016
- Nationality: Hungary
- Born: May 2, 1985 (age 41) Szombathely

FIA European Truck Racing Championship career
- Categorisation: FIA Gold
- Years active: 2011-
- Teams: Révész Racing; Tankpool24 Racing; OXXO Energy Truck Racing

Championship titles
- 2014, 2015, 2021, 2022, 2023, 2024, 2025, 2026: FIA European Truck Racing Championship

Norbert "Norbi" Kiss (born 2 May 1985 in Szombathely) is a Hungarian truck race driver. He is an eight-time FIA European Truck Racing Championship champion. He is one of the most successful Hungarians in motorsport.

== Career ==
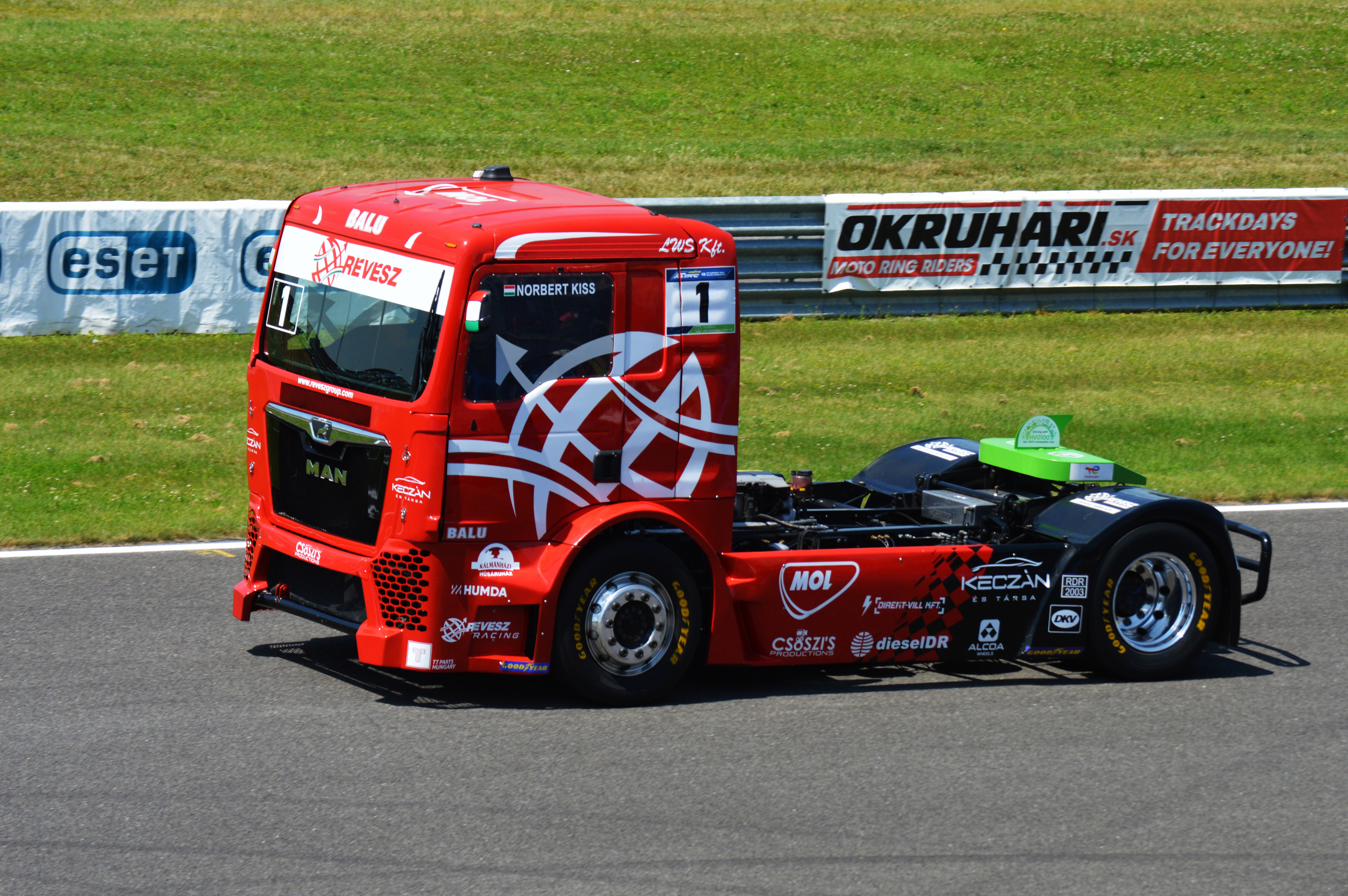
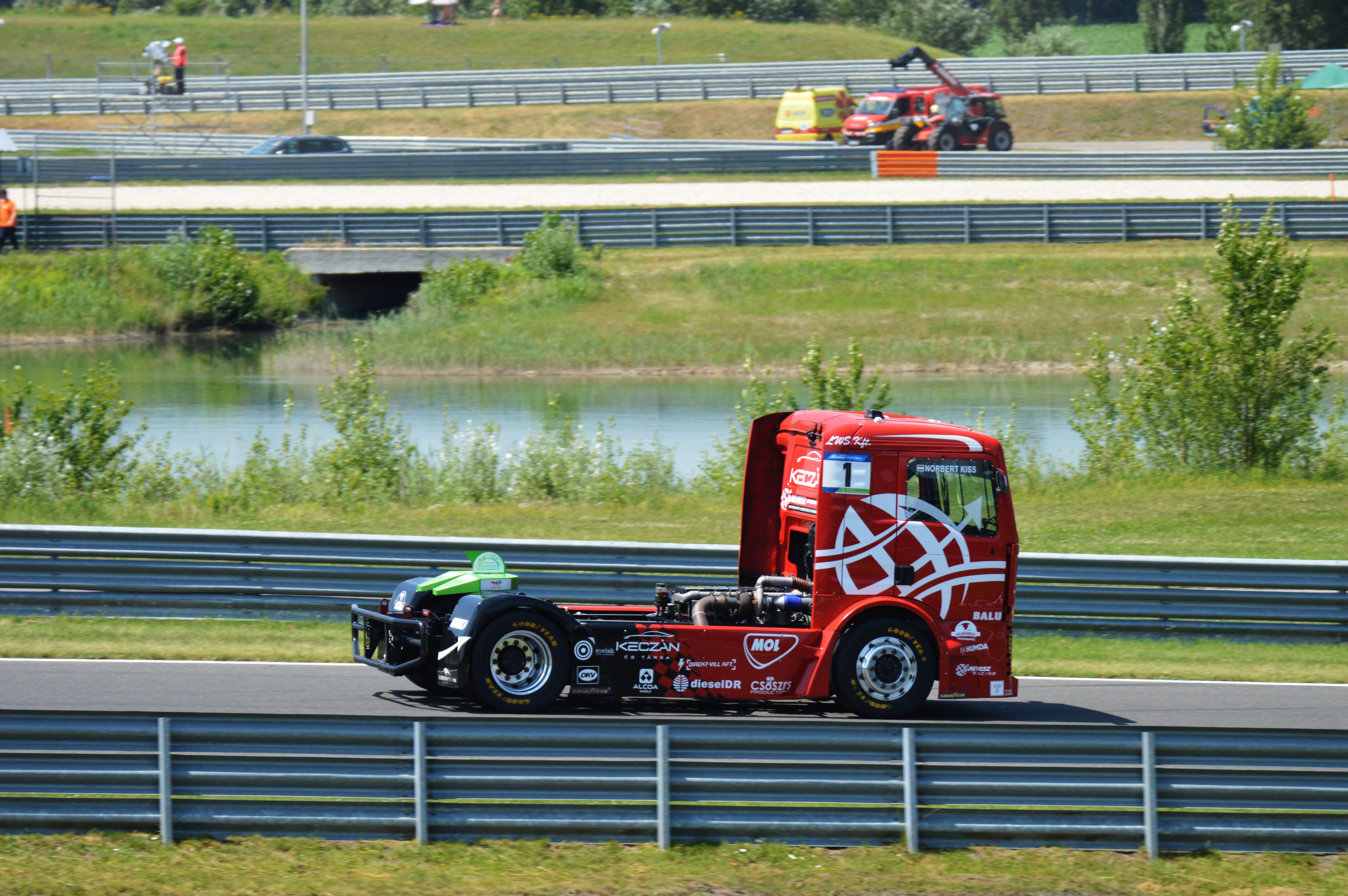
Kiss with a MAN at the 2024 FIA ETRC Truck Race of Slovakia, where he won all four races of the weekend.

Kiss began racing with race car simulator, Live for Speed. The success he achieved in the simulator made people become aware of him. In 2005, Kiss raced for a short season in the Opel Astra Cup with four wins and was nominated Rookie of the Year. In 2006, he won the most prestigious brand cup in Hungary, the Renault Clio Cup at the first attempt. In the series, he won ten times and only missed the rostrum once. At the end of that year, he received the Rookie of the Year award. In 2007, he competed in the Hungarian SEAT León Cup, which started competition that year, for the IMC Motorsport and he became champion with Gábor Wéber finishing runner up. His success continued in 2008, even though he had to face serious competition from Wéber and Norbert Michelisz. At the end of the year, he won the championship title again. The next year, he raced in two categories, the Suzuki Swift Cup and the E category among the formula cars, with the Formula Renault. He won the Suzuki Cup (eight wins) and also landed top spot in the Formula Renault Group, he finished second in the absolute evaluation. In 2010, he featured the Zengő Motorsport in the Spanish SEAT León Supercopa for an incomplete season: one win, two second places and several good finishes throughout the year. He was third behind Carol and Nogues, but as his car was badly damaged in Jerez, he could not race at the final weekend and finished in sixth place. In 2014 and 2015, he became the champion in the FIA European Truck Racing Championship. In 2021, he achieved his third European Champion title, and in the following year he won the championship with five races before the end of the season, thus defended his title for his fourth European Championship.

Over the years, Kiss never stopped pursuing virtual motorsports. He started racing in popular racing sim game iRacing and competed with a variety of Hungarian teams over the years, mainly in endurance races like the 24 hours of the Nürburgring. In 2021, he joined Team Racewerk.com, a German simracing team sponsored by a simracing hardware manufacturer and celebrated multiple wins and podium results in high rated endurance races, most notably the DNLS championship in the SP9 class, for which he partnered with Mercedes-AMG E-Sports Team HTR. In 2022, he joined getcloserracing Team, a team sponsored by a virtual motorsport business located in Dortmund, Germany. Kiss also functions as one of the brand ambassadors for getcloserracing and regularly competes in online endurance racing events with the team on iRacing.

== Results ==
=== 2005 ===
- Mobil 1 Opel Astra Cup, 4 wins, 5th place
- Rookie of the Year

=== 2006 ===
- Shell V-Power Renault Clio Cup champion, 10 wins
- Speed Car Racer of the Year

=== 2007 ===
- Hungarian SEAT León Supercup champion, eight wins
- Porsche Mobil 1 Supercup race, 16th place

=== 2008 ===
- SEAT León Supercopa champion, 4 victories, 4 second places, 1 third place, 1 retirement

=== 2009 ===
- Genex Suzuki Swift Cup champion, 8 wins, 1 third grid, 1, 1 retirement
- Single-seater Formula cars (E group) championship 2. place
- Formula Renault Group champion

=== 2010 ===
- Spanish SEAT León Supercopa 6. place

=== 2011 ===
- FIA European Truck Racing Championship, 12th place with the #12 truck

=== 2012 ===
- European Truck Racing Championship, 10th place with the #12 truck

=== 2013 ===
- European Truck Racing Championship, 4th place with the #10 truck

=== 2014 ===
- European Truck Racing Championship, 1st European Championship with the #4 truck

=== 2015 ===
- European Truck Racing Championship, 2nd European Championship with the #1 truck, defending his title

=== 2016 ===
- European Truck Racing Championship, 5th place with the #1 truck

=== 2017 ===
- European Truck Racing Championship, 3rd place with #24 truck

=== 2018 ===
- European Truck Racing Championship, 5th place with the #3 truck

=== 2019 ===
- European Truck Racing Championship, 6th place with the #5 truck

=== 2020 ===
- European Truck Racing Championship, 1st place with the #40 truck; the season was ended after only two events out of a planned 8, mainly due to COVID-19 restrictions. No title was awarded in 2020.

=== 2021 ===
- European Truck Racing Championship, 3rd European Championship with the #41 truck

=== 2022 ===
- European Truck Racing Championship, 4th European Championship with the #1 truck, defending his title 5 races before the end of the season

=== 2023 ===
- European Truck Racing Championship, 5th European Championship with the #1 truck, defending his title 5 races before the end of the season

=== 2024 ===
- European Truck Racing Championship, 6th European Championship with the #1 truck, defending his title 5 races before the end of the season

== Full ETRC results ==
Year	#	Team	Truck	1				2				3				4				5				6				7				8				9				10				11				Pos	Pts
2011	12	OXXO Racing Team	MAN	GBR (United Kingdom)				ITA (Italy)				ESP (Spain)				FRA (France)				GER (Germany)				RUS (Russia)				CZE (Czech Republic)				BEL (Belgium)				ESP (Spain)				FRA (France)								12th	63
2011	12	OXXO Racing Team	MAN																													8	4	6	4	12	8	8	1	8	3	7	2					12th	63
2012	12	OXXO Racing Team	MAN	TUR (Turkey)				ITA (Italy)				ESP (Spain)				FRA (France)				GBR (United Kingdom)				GER (Germany)				RUS (Russia)				CZE (Czech Republic)				BEL (Belgium)				ESP (Spain)				FRA (France)				10th	98
2012	12	OXXO Racing Team	MAN									20	DNS	8	Ret	12	11	7	15	8	7	8	1					DNS	DNS	14	11	9	9	9	9	4	11	Ret	18	8	1	7	1	8	1	8	1	10th	98
2013	10	OXXO Racing Team	MAN	ITA (Italy)				ESP (Spain)				FRA (France)				AUT (Austria)				GER (Germany)				RUS (Russia)				CZE (Czech Republic)				BEL (Belgium)				ESP (Spain)				FRA (France)								4th	301
2013	10	OXXO Racing Team	MAN	13	Ret	2	7	10	7	2	4	3	4	5	3	3	2	3	2	7	Ret	3	1	1	5	Ret	NI	9	Ret	4	Ret	2	3	3	3	4	2	2	Ret	2	4	2	Ret					4th	301
2014	4	OXXO Racing Team	MAN	ITA (Italy)				ESP (Spain)				FRA (France)				AUT (Austria)				GER (Germany)				CZE (Czech Republic)				BEL (Belgium)				ESP (Spain)				FRA (France)												1st	401
2014	4	OXXO Racing Team	MAN	5	1	1	10	2	2	2	2	2	6	3	2	1	3	3	2	2	3	5	3	1	6	7	Ret	2	2	1	6	1	5	1	6	1	3	1	6									1st	401
2015	1	OXXO Racing Team	MAN	ESP (Spain)				AUT (Austria)				ITA (Italy)				FRA (France)				GER (Germany)				CZE (Czech Republic)				HUN (Hungary)				BEL (Belgium)				ESP (Spain)				FRA (France)								1st	599
2015	1	OXXO Racing Team	MAN	2	1	1	4	1	1	1	1	3	1	1	3	7	1	1	5	1	5	1	4	1	4	2	4	1	3	1	2	1	3	1	2	1	3	1	11	3	3	2	Ret					1st	599
2016	1	Tankpool24 Racing	Mercedes-Benz	AUT (Austria)				ITA (Italy)				FRA (France)				GER (Germany)				HUN (Hungary)				CZE (Czech Republic)				BEL (Belgium)				ESP (Spain)				FRA (France)												5th	216
2016	1	Tankpool24 Racing	Mercedes-Benz	8	Ret	6	6	8	4	3	11	1	6	Ret	Ret	4	3	3	4	2	3	2	3	10	6	6	4	6	Ret	4	Ret	9	7	5	Ret	2	4	Ret	Ret									5th	216
2017	24	Tankpool24 Racing	Mercedes-Benz	AUT (Austria)				ITA (Italy)				GER (Germany)				SVK (Slovakia)				HUN (Hungary)				CZE (Czech Republic)				BEL (Belgium)				FRA (France)				ESP (Spain)												3rd	315
2017	24	Tankpool24 Racing	Mercedes-Benz	6	2	10	Ret	2	9	2	3	2	9	2	C	1	8	1	3	1	Ret	2	Ret	3	17†	5	4	1	2	5	3	3	1	4	5	16†	5	1	6									3rd	315
2018	3	Tankpool24 Racing	Mercedes-Benz	ITA (Italy)				HUN (Hungary)				GER (Germany)				SVK (Slovakia)				CZE (Czech Republic)				BEL (Belgium)				FRA (France)				ESP (Spain)																5th	207
2018	3	Tankpool24 Racing	Mercedes-Benz	DSQ	5	3	4	2	5	4	3	3	4	19	6	4	4	6	1	5	3	4	2	4	8	12	5	3	7	4	10	DNS	Ret	Ret	7													5th	207
2019	5	Tankpool24 Racing	Mercedes-Benz	ITA (Italy)				HUN (Hungary)				SVK (Slovakia)				GER (Germany)				CZE (Czech Republic)				BEL (Belgium)				FRA (France)				ESP (Spain)																6th	190
2019	5	Tankpool24 Racing	Mercedes-Benz	4	7	1	Ret	6	5	3	6	5	4	5	2	3	Ret	7	1	14	11	C	C	5	3	3	4	DSQ	DNS	Ret	Ret	6	1	5	1													6th	190
2020	40	Révész TRT	MAN	CZE (Czech Republic)				HUN (Hungary)																																								-	92
2020	40	Révész TRT	MAN	1	6	3	C	2	1	1	1																																					-	92
2021	41	Révész Racing	MAN	HUN (Hungary)				CZE (Czech Republic)				BEL (Belgium)				FRA (France)				ESP (Spain)				ITA (Italy)																								1st	276
2021	41	Révész Racing	MAN	Ret	C	1	1	1	3	1	5	1	8	4	1	3	1	1	5	1	4	1	5	2	3	1	6																					1st	276
2022	1	Révész Racing	MAN	ITA (Italy)				HUN (Hungary)				SVK (Slovakia)				GER (Germany)				CZE (Czech Republic)				BEL (Belgium)				FRA (France)				ESP (Spain)																1st	410
2022	1	Révész Racing	MAN	1	3	1	8	1	DNS	1	1	1	2	1	1	1	4	4	2	1	4	1	7	2	2	1	9	1	2	1	4	1	5	1	6													1st	410
2023	1	Révész Racing	MAN	ITA (Italy)				SVK (Slovakia)				POL (Poland)				GER (Germany)				CZE (Czech Republic)				BEL (Belgium)				FRA (France)				ESP (Spain)																1st	419
2023	1	Révész Racing	MAN	Ret	1	1	5	1	1	1	1	1	5	1	3	1	1	1	2	1	4	1	1	Ret	1	1	1	1	3	1	4	1	1	1	3													1st	419
2024	1	Révész Racing	MAN	ITA (Italy)				SVK (Slovakia)				BEL (Belgium)				GER (Germany)				CZE (Czech Republic)				FRA (France)				ESP (Spain)																				1st	397
2024	1	Révész Racing	MAN	1	1	1	1	1	1	1	1	1	1	1	3	1	3	1	4	1	3	1	2	1	4	1	4	1	3	1	6																	1st	397
2025	1	Révész Racing	MAN	ITA (Italy)				LAU (Germany)				SVK (Slovakia)				NUR (Germany)				CZE (Czech Republic)				BEL (Belgium)				FRA (France)				ESP (Spain)																1st	419
2025	1	Révész Racing	MAN	1	1	1	1	1	6	1	C	1	1	1	C	1	3	1	3	1	2	1	3	1	8	1	3	1	4	1	8	1	4	1	8													1st	419
