= Poznań Circuit =

Motorsport race track in the Ławica area of Poznań, Poland

- Full Circuit (1977–present)
- Location: Ławica, Poznań, Poland
- Coordinates: 52°25′04″N 16°48′21″E
- FIA Grade: 4R
- Owner: Automobilklub Wielkopolski
- Broke ground: 1975
- Opened: 1 December 1977; 48 years ago
- Major events: Current: Porsche Sprint Challenge Central Europe (2019, 2021, 2023–2026); Former: European Truck Racing Championship (2023); TCR Eastern Europe (2021–2022); Drift Masters (2015–2017)
- Website: https://www.aw.poznan.pl/tor-poznan-1

Full Circuit (1977–present)
- Surface: Asphalt
- Length: 4.083 km (2.537 mi)
- Turns: 14
- Race lap record: 1:24.401 ( (Czech Republic) Tomáš Kostka, Mercedes-Benz AMG C-Class DTM (W203), 2011, DTM)

Kart Circuit (1980–present)
- Length: 1.509 km (0.938 mi)
- Turns: 21

The Poznań Circuit (Polish: Tor Poznań) is a 4.083 km (2.537 mi) motorsport race track located in the Ławica area of Poznań, Poland. The circuit also has a small 1.509 km (0.938 mi) kart circuit layout. The circuit was resurfaced and renovated in 2006; as an FIA Grade 3 circuit, it is the only racing circuit homologated by the FIA in Poland.

In October 2023, a decision to close the circuit due to violation of noise regulations was issued following an inspection by the Polish Chief Inspectorate of Environmental Protection. In April 2026, it was formally announced that the circuit would be closed after an appeal by the circuit's owners was rejected. The next day, the Inspectorate temporarily suspended the decision.

== Lap records ==
Marc Gené held the unofficial lap record with a lap of 1:14.700 with Ferrari 248 F1 in a demonstration event in 2007. As of July 2026, the fastest official race lap records at the Tor Poznań are listed as:

Category	Time	Driver	Vehicle	Event
Full Circuit (1977–present): 4.083 km (2.537 mi)
DTM	1:24.401	Tomáš Kostka	Mercedes-Benz AMG C-Class DTM (W203)	2011 Poznań FIA CEZ Championship round
Formula Three	1:24.544	Jakub Śmiechowski	Dallara F308	2015 Poznań FIA CEZ F3 round
GT3	1:29.840	Marcin Jedliński	Mercedes-AMG GT3	2021 Poznań FIA Central European Zone Circuit Championship round
Superbike	1:31.226	Milan Pawelec	BMW M1000RR	2023 3rd Poznań Polish Superbike round
Porsche Carrera Cup	1:31.481	Matyas Faiereisl	Porsche 911 (992 I) GT3 Cup	2026 Poznań Porsche Sprint Challenge Central Europe round
GT4	1:36.167	Matěj Pavlíček	KTM X-Bow GT4	2021 Poznań FIA Central European Zone Circuit Championship round
TCR Touring Car	1:36.964	Petr Semerád	Hyundai i30 N TCR	2022 Poznań TCR Eastern Europe Trophy round
Renault Clio Cup	1:44.635	Tomas Pekar	Renault Clio R.S. IV	2020 Poznań Renault Clio Cup Central Europe round
Truck racing	1:57.893	Norbert Kiss	MAN TGS	2023 Poznań ETRC round
