= 2020 European Truck Racing Championship =

The 2020 European Truck Racing Championship was a motor-racing championship using highly tuned tractor units. It is the 36th year of the championship. An eight-round season was originally slated to begin April 25 at the Hungaroring and end October 4 at the Circuito del Jarama. However, due to the effects of the COVID-19 pandemic, the schedule was delayed, shortened, and rearranged, with a two-round season starting August 29 at Autodrom Most and ending October 18 at the Hungaroring.

== Calendar ==
The original calendar saw all rounds from the 2019 season return for 2020. The rounds at the Hungaroring and the Misano World Circuit switched spots, constituting the only change in order. In addition to the eight championship rounds, test sessions at the Red Bull Ring in Austria were scheduled for June 18 and 19.

Following restrictions put in place due to the COVID-19 pandemic, the schedule was forced to be adjusted. The rounds at the Hungaroring and the Misano World Circuit were postponed, while the rounds at the Circuito del Jarama and Le Mans were moved to fit the postponed races. Additionally, the round scheduled for the Nürburgring was cancelled, leaving the new schedule with 7 rounds. The schedule was revised again with new restrictions, with the Slovakia Ring round cancelled, and the Hungaroring round postponed even further. On September 6, the rounds at Circuit Zolder and Circuito del Jarama were both cancelled. On September 30, the series announced the round at the Bugatti Circuit had also been cancelled. On October 30, the round at Misano World Circuit was cancelled, effectively ending the season after 2 events.

Round		Circuit	Date
1	R1	(Czech Republic) Autodrom Most, Most	29 August
1	R2	(Czech Republic) Autodrom Most, Most	29 August
1	R3	(Czech Republic) Autodrom Most, Most	30 August
1	R4	(Czech Republic) Autodrom Most, Most	30 August
2	R1	(Hungary) Hungaroring, Mogyoród	17 October
2	R2	(Hungary) Hungaroring, Mogyoród	17 October
2	R3	(Hungary) Hungaroring, Mogyoród	18 October
2	R4	(Hungary) Hungaroring, Mogyoród	18 October
Cancelled due to the 2019-20 coronavirus pandemic
Circuit			Original Date
(Italy) Misano World Circuit, Misano Adriatico			28–29 May
Slovakia Ring, Orechová Potôň			6–7 June
(Germany) Nürburgring, Nürburg			18–19 July
(Belgium) Circuit Zolder, Heusden-Zolder			12–13 September
(France) Bugatti Circuit, Le Mans			26–27 September
(Spain) Circuito del Jarama, San Sebastián de los Reyes			3–4 October

== Teams and drivers ==
A provisional entry list was released on May 15, 2020.

Team	Manufacturer	No.	Drivers	Rounds	Class
(Germany) Team Hahn Racing	Iveco	1	(Germany) Jochen Hahn	All	
(Germany) Team Hahn Racing	Iveco	22	(Germany) Lukas Hahn	1	P
(Germany) Truck Sport Lutz Bernau	MAN	2	(Spain) Antonio Albacete	All	
(Czech Republic) Buggyra Zero Mileage Racing	Freightliner	20	(France) Téo Calvet	All	P
(Czech Republic) Buggyra Zero Mileage Racing	Freightliner	29	(United Arab Emirates) Aliyyah Koloc	All	P
(Czech Republic) Buggyra Zero Mileage Racing	Freightliner	55	(Czech Republic) Adam Lacko	All	
(United Kingdom) Anderson Racing	MAN	23	(United Kingdom) Jamie Anderson	1	P
(Germany) Tankpool 24 Racing	Scania	24	(Germany) Steffen Faas	All	P
(Germany) Heinrich-Clemens Hecker	MAN	25	(Germany) Heinrich-Clemens Hecker	All	P
(Germany) SL Trucksport 30	MAN	30	(Germany) Sascha Lenz	1	
(Hungary) Révész TRT	MAN	40	(Hungary) Norbert Kiss	All	
(Germany) Team Schwabentruck	Iveco	44	(Germany) Stephanie Halm	All	
(Spain) Luis Recuenco	MAN	64	(Spain) Luis Recuenco	All	P
(France) Lion Truck Racing	MAN	66	(France) Anthony Janiec	All	
(Germany) Reinert Racing	Iveco	77	(Germany) René Reinert	1	

Icon	Class
P	Promoter's Cup

== Results and standings ==
=== Season summary ===
Round		Circuit	Pole position	Fastest lap	Winning driver	Winning team	Promoter's Cup winner
1	R1	(Czech Republic) Autodrom Most, Most	(Hungary) Norbert Kiss	(Hungary) Norbert Kiss	(Hungary) Norbert Kiss	(Hungary) Révész TRT	(United Kingdom) Jamie Anderson
1	R2	(Czech Republic) Autodrom Most, Most		(Germany) Sascha Lenz	(Czech Republic) Adam Lacko	(Czech Republic) Buggyra Zero Mileage Racing	(United Kingdom) Jamie Anderson
1	R3	(Czech Republic) Autodrom Most, Most	(Hungary) Norbert Kiss	(Czech Republic) Adam Lacko	(Germany) Sascha Lenz	(Germany) SL Trucksport 30	(France) Téo Calvet
1	R4	(Czech Republic) Autodrom Most, Most	Race cancelled due to heavy rain				
2	R1	(Hungary) Hungaroring, Mogyoród	(Czech Republic) Adam Lacko	(Czech Republic) Adam Lacko	(Czech Republic) Adam Lacko	(Czech Republic) Buggyra Zero Mileage Racing	(Germany) Steffen Faas
2	R2	(Hungary) Hungaroring, Mogyoród		(Hungary) Norbert Kiss	(Hungary) Norbert Kiss	(Hungary) Révész TRT	(France) Téo Calvet
2	R3	(Hungary) Hungaroring, Mogyoród	(Hungary) Norbert Kiss	(Hungary) Norbert Kiss	(Hungary) Norbert Kiss	(Hungary) Révész TRT	(Germany) Steffen Faas
2	R4	(Hungary) Hungaroring, Mogyoród		(Hungary) Norbert Kiss	(Hungary) Norbert Kiss	(Hungary) Révész TRT	(France) Téo Calvet

=== Drivers championship ===
As a result of the number of rounds cancelled due to the COVID-19 pandemic, the drivers championship was not awarded for the season.

Each round or racing event consists of four races. At each race, points are awarded to the top ten classified finishers using the following structure:

Position	**1st**	**2nd**	**3rd**	**4th**	**5th**	**6th**	**7th**	**8th**	**9th**	**10th**
Points (races 1 and 3)	20	15	12	10	8	6	4	3	2	1
Points (races 2 and 4)	10	9	8	7	6	5	4	3	2	1

Pos.	Driver	MOS^{1} (Czech Republic)				HUN (Hungary)				Pts.
1	(Hungary) Norbert Kiss	**1**	6	**3**	C	2	1	**1**	1	92
2	(Czech Republic) Adam Lacko	4	1	2	C	**1**	2	2	4	86
3	(Germany) Jochen Hahn	2	3	4	C	3	5	3	2	72
4	(Germany) Sascha Lenz	3	2	1	C					41
5	(Germany) Stephanie Halm	5	5	6	C	8	10	5	5	38
6	(Spain) Antonio Albacete	11	8	9	C	4	4	4	8	35
7	(Germany) Steffen Faas	12	9	8	C	5	6	6	7	28
8	(France) Téo Calvet	Ret	11	7	C	6	3	8	6	26
9	(France) Anthony Janiec	DNS	10	5	C	7	DNS	7	3	25
10	(United Kingdom) Jamie Anderson	6	4	10	C					14
11	(Germany) Heinrich-Clemens Hecker	9	12	15	C	10	7	10	9	10
12	(Spain) Luis Recuenco	13	13	14	C	9	8	9	10	8
13	(Germany) Lukas Hahn	10	7	11	C					5
14	(United Arab Emirates) Aliyyah Koloc	8	Ret	13	C	11	9	11	Ret	5
15	(Germany) René Reinert	7	14	12	C					4
Pos.	Driver	MOS^{1} (Czech Republic)				HUN (Hungary)				Pts.

Colour	Result
Gold	Winner
Silver	Second place
Bronze	Third place
Green	Points classification
Blue	Non-points classification
Blue	Non-classified finish (NC)
Purple	Retired, not classified (Ret)
Red	Did not qualify (DNQ)
Red	Did not pre-qualify (DNPQ)
Black	Disqualified (DSQ)
White	Did not start (DNS)
White	Withdrew (WD)
White	Race cancelled (C)
Blank	Did not practice (DNP)
Blank	Did not arrive (DNA)
Blank	Excluded (EX)

**Bold** – Pole
Italics – Fastest Lap

^{1} Race 4 cancelled due to heavy rain.
