= 2021 ESET V4 Cup =

The 2021 ESET V4 Cup is the ninth season of the ESET V4 Cup. The season began on 15 April at the Hungaroring and will end on 5 September at Automotodrom Brno. The season consists of the TCR, GT, Endurance, Clio Cup, Twingo Cup, and D2 championships.

== Calendar ==
The calendar for all championships was announced on 17 March 2021.

| Rnd. | Circuit/Location | Date |
|---|---|---|
| 1 | Hungaroring, Budapest, Hungary | 15–17 April |
| 2 | Automotodróm Slovakia Ring, Orechová Potôň, Slovakia | 7–9 May |
| 3 | Tor Poznań, Poznań, Poland | 11–13 June |
| 4 | Automotodrom Grobnik, Rijeka, Croatia | 23–25 July |
| 5 | Automotodróm Slovakia Ring, Orechová Potôň, Slovakia | 20–22 August |
| 6 | Automotodrom Brno, Brno, Czech Republic | 3–5 September |

== GT ==
=== Teams and drivers ===
| Team | Car | No. | Driver | Class | Rounds |
D4
| (Poland) Olimp Racing | Mercedes-AMG GT3 Evo | 5 | (Poland) Stanislaw Jedlinski | **GT3** | 1–4 |
| (Poland) Olimp Racing | Mercedes-AMG GT3 Evo | 77 | (Poland) Marcin Jedlinski | **GT3** | 1–4 |
| (Slovenia) Lema Racing | CUPRA León TCR | 3 | (Italy) Giacomo Ghermandi | **TC-3.5** | 2 |
| (Slovenia) Lema Racing | Porsche Cayman GT4 Clubsport MR | 14 | (Slovenia) Grega Šimunovič | **GT4** | 1 |
| (Hungary) BOVI Motorsport | Porsche 997.2 GT3 Cup | 7 | (Hungary) Bódis Kálmán | **GTC** | 1–2, 4 |
| (Hungary) BOVI Motorsport | Audi S2 | 10 | (Hungary) László Keskeny | **GT+3.5** | 1 |
| (Czech Republic) RTR Project | KTM X-Bow GT4 | 8 | (Hungary) Erik Janiš | **GT4** | 1, 3 |
| (Czech Republic) RTR Project | KTM X-Bow GT4 | 8 | (Czech Republic) Matěj Pavlíček | **GT4** | 1–4 |
| (Czech Republic) RTR Project | KTM X-Bow GTX Concept | 33 | (Czech Republic) Tomáš Miniberger | **GTC** | 2–4 |
| (Czech Republic) RTR Project | KTM X-Bow GTX Concept | 33 | (Czech Republic) Sergej Pavlovec | **GTC** | 2–4 |
| (Czech Republic) RTR Project | KTM X-Bow GT4 | 93 | (Czech Republic) Tomáš Miniberger | **GT4** | 2 |
| (Czech Republic) RTR Project | KTM X-Bow GT4 | 93 | (Czech Republic) Sergej Pavlovec | **GT4** | 2 |
| (Poland) Good Speed Racing Team | Mercedes-AMG GT3 Evo | 14 | (Poland) Piotr Wira | **GT3** | 2–4 |
| (Slovakia) Trevor Racing | BMW M6 GT3 | 24 | (Slovakia) Gregor Zsigo | **GT3** | 1–4 |
| (Slovakia) Trevor Racing | BMW M4 GT4 | 40 | (Hungary) Ferenc Ficza | **GT4** | 1–4 |
| (Czech Republic) Duck Racing | Audi R8 LMS ultra | 27 | (Czech Republic) Petr Kačírek | **GT3** | 1-3 |
| (Czech Republic) Duck Racing | Lamborghini Huracán Super Trofeo Evo | 100 | (Czech Republic) Dennis Waszek | **GTC** | 2–4 |
| (Czech Republic) Buggyra Zero Mileage Racing | Mercedes-AMG GT3 Evo | 29 | (Czech Republic) Aliyyah Koloc | **GT3** | 1–2 |
| (Czech Republic) Buggyra Zero Mileage Racing | Mercedes-AMG GT3 Evo | 29 | (Czech Republic) David Vrsecky | **GT3** | 2 |
| (United Arab Emirates) Buggyra Racing | Mercedes-AMG GT4 | 29 | (Czech Republic) Aliyyah Koloc | **GT4** | 4 |
| (United Arab Emirates) Buggyra Racing | Mercedes-AMG GT4 | 29 | (Czech Republic) David Vrsecky | **GT4** | 4 |
| (Hungary) Car Competition Racing Team | Ferrari 488 Challenge Evo | 30 | (Hungary) István Bóta | **GTC** | 1 |
| (Poland) Basenhurt A&T Racing | Porsche 991.2 GT3 Cup | 34 | (Poland) Adam Rzepecki | **GTC** | 1–4 |
| (Czech Republic) GT2 Motorsport | Porsche 991.2 GT3 Cup | 85 | (Czech Republic) Petr Brecka | **GTC** | 4 |
| (Serbia) GM Racing Team | Chevrolet Cruze WTCC | 42 | (Serbia) Zoran Kastratovic | **TC-3.5** | 1–2, 4 |
| (Serbia) GM Racing Team | CUPRA León TCR | 365 | (Serbia) Nemanja Milovanovic | **TC-3.5** | 1–2, 4 |
| (Slovakia) Autocentrum Bratislava | Mercedes-AMG GT3 | 707 | (Czech Republic) Libor Milota | **GT3** | 2 |
| (Poland) A&P Racing Team by PTT Tech Support | Porsche 991.2 GT3 Cup | 991 | (Poland) Maciej Blazek | **GTC** | 1 |
| (Hungary) Zengő Motorsport Services Kft | CUPRA León TCR | 999 | (Hungary) Gábor Kismarty-Lechner | **TC-3.5** | 1 |
D5
| (Poland) Psofix | Radical SR3 RSX | 2 | (Poland) Jacek Zielonka | 1–4 | |
| (Czech Republic) Janík Motorsport | Norma M30 | 3 | (Czech Republic) Václav Janík | 1 | |
| (Slovakia) ARC Bratislava | Ligier JS P2 | 4 | (Slovakia) Miro Konôpka | 1–2 | |
| (Slovakia) ARC Bratislava | Ginetta-Juno P3-15 | 6 | (Slovakia) Matej Konôpka | 2 | |
Group 3
| (Croatia) AK Dubrovnik Racing | Volkswagen Golf (MkV) | 1 | (Croatia) Maro Franic | **Class 9** | 1 |
| (Croatia) AK Dubrovnik Racing | Honda Civic Type R | 73 | (Croatia) Nikola Radnjić | **Class 8** | 1 |
| (Croatia) AK Dubrovnik Racing | Honda Civic Type R | 100 | (Croatia) Luka Fanijančić | **Class 7** | 1 |
| (Croatia) AK Zagorje | Renault Clio Cup | 12 | (Croatia) Vedran Šipoš | **Class 9** | 1 |
| (Croatia) AK Zagorje | Renault Clio RS | 888 | (Croatia) Marko Devčić | **Class 9** | 1 |
| (Croatia) AKK Fly by Kolman | BMW 318is (E36) | 18 | (Croatia) Ivica Marić | **Class 9** | 1 |
| (Croatia) AK Buzet Autosport | Renault Clio Cup | 55 | (Croatia) Valter Nežić | **Class 9** | 1 |
| (Croatia) AK Buzet Autosport | Honda Civic Type R | 96 | (Croatia) Nikolas Feher | **Class 7** | 1 |
| (Czech Republic) Buggyra Zero Mileage Racing | Renault Clio Cup | 65 | (France) Teo Calvet | **Class 9** | 1 |
| (Croatia) AK Istra Racing Team Pazin | Renault Clio Cup | 69 | (Croatia) Ivan Gustin | **Class 9** | 1 |
| (Croatia) AK Istra Racing Team Pazin | Renault Clio III | 83 | (Croatia) Stefani Mogorović | **Class 7** | 1 |
| (Croatia) Cobra Virovitica | Renault Clio Cup | 333 | (Croatia) Igor Tomljanovic | **Class 9** | 1 |
| (Montenegro) AMD Kotor | Honda Civic Type R | 996 | (Montenegro) Filip Petkovic | **Class 7** | 1 |
Group 4
| (Croatia) AK Makarska | Škoda Fabia | 15 | (Croatia) Frane Jukić | **Class 11** | 1 |
| (Croatia) AK Dubrovnik Racing | SEAT Ibiza Cupra | 79 | (Croatia) Veljko Bubicic | **Class 12** | 1 |
LCEE
| (Hungary) GFS Racing Team | Lotus Exige V6 Cup R | 66 | (Hungary) "Luigi" | 1 | |

| Icon | Class |
Car
| **GT3** | GT3 |
| **GT4** | GT4 |
| **GTC** | GTC |
| **GT+3.5** | GT+3.5 |
| **TC-3.5** | TC-3.5 |

=== Results ===
Bold indicates overall winner.

| Round | | Circuit | Pole position | Fastest lap | GT3 Winning Team | GT4 Winning Team | GTC Winning Team | GT+3.5 Winning Team | TC-3.5 Winning Team | D5 Winning Team | Group 3 Winning Team | Group 4 Winning Team | LCEE Winning Team |
| Round | | Circuit | Pole position | Fastest lap | GT3 Winning Driver | GT4 Winning Driver | GTC Winning Driver | GT+3.5 Winning Driver | TC-3.5 Winning Driver | D5 Winning Driver | Group 3 Winning Driver | Group 4 Winning Driver | LCEE Winning Driver |
|---|---|---|---|---|---|---|---|---|---|---|---|---|---|
| 1 | 1 | Hungaroring, Budapest, Hungary | (Czech Republic) No. 3 Janík Motorsport | (Slovakia) No. 4 ARC Bratislava | (Poland) No. 77 Olimp Racing | (Czech Republic) No. 8 RTR Project | (Poland) No. 991 A&P Racing Team by PTT Tech Support | (Hungary) No. 10 BOVI Motorsport | (Hungary) No. 999 Zengő Motorsport Services Kft | **(Slovakia) No. 4 ARC Bratislava** | (Czech Republic) No. 65 Buggyra Zero Mileage Racing | (Croatia) No. 79 AK Dubrovnik Racing | (Hungary) No. 66 GFS Racing Team |
| 1 | 1 | Hungaroring, Budapest, Hungary | (Czech Republic) Václav Janík | (Slovakia) Miro Konôpka | (Poland) Marcin Jedlinski | (Czech Republic) Matěj Pavlíček | (Poland) Maciej Blazek | (Hungary) László Keskeny | (Hungary) Gábor Kismarty-Lechner | **(Slovakia) Miro Konôpka** | (France) Teo Calvet | (Croatia) Veljko Bubicic | (Hungary) "Luigi" |
| 1 | 2 | Hungaroring, Budapest, Hungary | (Slovakia) No. 4 ARC Bratislava | (Slovakia) No. 4 ARC Bratislava | (Czech Republic) No. 29 Buggyra Zero Mileage Racing | (Slovakia) No. 40 Trevor Racing | (Poland) No. 34 Basenhurt A&T Racing | No starters | (Hungary) No. 999 Zengő Motorsport Services Kft | **(Slovakia) No. 4 ARC Bratislava** | (Croatia) No. 1 AK Dubrovnik Racing | (Croatia) No. 79 AK Dubrovnik Racing | (Hungary) No. 66 GFS Racing Team |
| 1 | 2 | Hungaroring, Budapest, Hungary | (Slovakia) Miro Konôpka | (Slovakia) Miro Konôpka | (Czech Republic) Aliyyah Koloc | (Hungary) Ferenc Ficza | (Poland) Adam Rzepecki | No starters | (Hungary) Gábor Kismarty-Lechner | **(Slovakia) Miro Konôpka** | (Croatia) Maro Franic | (Croatia) Veljko Bubicic | (Hungary) "Luigi" |
| 2 | 3 | Automotodróm Slovakia Ring, Orechová Potôň, Slovakia | (Slovakia) No. 6 ARC Bratislava | (Slovakia) No. 4 ARC Bratislava | (Poland) No. 77 Olimp Racing | (Czech Republic) No. 8 RTR Project | (Czech Republic) No. 100 Duck Racing | No entries | (Serbia) No. 365 GM Racing Team | **(Slovakia) No. 4 ARC Bratislava** | No entries | | |
| 2 | 3 | Automotodróm Slovakia Ring, Orechová Potôň, Slovakia | (Slovakia) Matej Konôpka | (Slovakia) Miro Konôpka | (Poland) Marcin Jedlinski | (Czech Republic) Matěj Pavlíček | (Czech Republic) Dennis Waszek | No entries | (Serbia) Nemanja Milovanovic | **(Slovakia) Miro Konôpka** | No entries | | |
| 2 | 4 | Automotodróm Slovakia Ring, Orechová Potôň, Slovakia | (Slovakia) No. 4 ARC Bratislava | (Slovakia) No. 4 ARC Bratislava | (Poland) No. 77 Olimp Racing | (Czech Republic) No. 8 RTR Project | (Czech Republic) No. 100 Duck Racing | No entries | (Serbia) No. 365 GM Racing Team | **(Slovakia) No. 4 ARC Bratislava** | No entries | | |
| 2 | 4 | Automotodróm Slovakia Ring, Orechová Potôň, Slovakia | (Slovakia) Miro Konôpka | (Slovakia) Miro Konôpka | (Poland) Marcin Jedlinski | (Czech Republic) Matěj Pavlíček | (Czech Republic) Dennis Waszek | No entries | (Serbia) Nemanja Milovanovic | **(Slovakia) Miro Konôpka** | No entries | | |
| 3 | 5 | Tor Poznań, Poznań, Poland | | | | | | | | | | | |
| 3 | 6 | Tor Poznań, Poznań, Poland | | | | | | | | | | | |
| 4 | 7 | Automotodrom Grobnik, Rijeka, Croatia | (Slovakia) No. 24 Trevor Racing | (Czech Republic) No. 33 RTR Project | (Slovakia) No. 24 Trevor Racing | (Czech Republic) No. 8 RTR Project | (Czech Republic) **No. 33 RTR Project** | No entries | (Serbia) No. 365 GM Racing Team | (Poland) No. 2 Psofix | No entries | | |
| 4 | 7 | Automotodrom Grobnik, Rijeka, Croatia | (Slovakia) Gregor Zsigo | (Czech Republic) Tomáš Miniberger | (Slovakia) Gregor Zsigo | (Czech Republic) Matěj Pavlíček | (Czech Republic) **Tomáš Miniberger** | No entries | (Serbia) Nemanja Milovanovic | (Poland) Jacek Zielonka | No entries | | |
| 4 | 8 | Automotodrom Grobnik, Rijeka, Croatia | (Czech Republic) No. 33 RTR Project | | (Slovakia) No. 24 Trevor Racing | (United Arab Emirates) No. 29 Buggyra Racing | (Czech Republic) **No. 33 RTR Project** | No entries | | (Poland) No. 2 Psofix | No entries | | |
| 4 | 8 | Automotodrom Grobnik, Rijeka, Croatia | (Czech Republic) Tomáš Miniberger | | (Slovakia) Gregor Zsigo | (Czech Republic) Aliyyah Koloc | (Czech Republic) **Tomáš Miniberger** | No entries | | (Poland) Jacek Zielonka | No entries | | |
| 5 | 9 | Automotodróm Slovakia Ring, Orechová Potôň, Slovakia | | | | | | | | | | | |
| 5 | 10 | Automotodróm Slovakia Ring, Orechová Potôň, Slovakia | | | | | | | | | | | |
| 6 | 11 | Automotodrom Brno, Brno, Czech Republic | | | | | | | | | | | |
| 6 | 12 | Automotodrom Brno, Brno, Czech Republic | | | | | | | | | | | |

== Endurance ==
=== Teams and drivers ===
| Team | Car | No. | Drivers | Class | Rounds |
D4
| (Hungary) GFS Racing Team | Aston Martin V12 Vantage GT3 | 08 | (Hungary) Sánta János | **GT3** | 2 |
| (Hungary) GFS Racing Team | Aston Martin V12 Vantage GT3 | 708 | (Hungary) Sánta János | **GT3** | 1 |
| (Poland) Olimp Racing | Mercedes-AMG GT3 Evo | 5 | (Poland) Stanislaw Jedlinski | **GT3** | 1–4 |
| (Poland) Olimp Racing | Mercedes-AMG GT3 Evo | 77 | (Poland) Marcin Jedlinski | **GT3** | 1–4 |
| (Hungary) BOVI Motorsport | Brokernet Silver Sting | 7 | (Hungary) Bódis Kálmán | **GTC** | 1 |
| (Hungary) BOVI Motorsport | Brokernet Silver Sting | 7 | (Hungary) Bódis Kálmán | **GT+3.5** | 2, 4 |
| (Czech Republic) RTR Project | KTM X-Bow GT4 | 8 | (Hungary) Erik Janiš | **GT4** | 1–4 |
| (Czech Republic) RTR Project | KTM X-Bow GT4 | 8 | (Czech Republic) Matěj Pavlíček | **GT4** | 1–4 |
| (Czech Republic) RTR Project | KTM X-Bow GT4 | 93 | (Czech Republic) Filip Sajler | **GT4** | 2, 4 |
| (Czech Republic) RTR Project | KTM X-Bow GT4 | 93 | (Czech Republic) Gabriela Sajlerova | **GT4** | 2, 4 |
| (Czech Republic) RTR Project | KTM X-Bow GTX Concept | 33 | (Czech Republic) Tomáš Miniberger | **GTC** | 2–4 |
| (Czech Republic) RTR Project | KTM X-Bow GTX Concept | 33 | (Czech Republic) Sergej Pavlovec | **GTC** | 2–4 |
| (Slovenia) Lema Racing | Porsche Cayman GT4 Clubsport MR | 14 | (Slovenia) Mathias Lodi | **GT4** | 1 |
| (Slovenia) Lema Racing | Porsche Cayman GT4 Clubsport MR | 14 | (Slovenia) Grega Šimunovič | **GT4** | 1 |
| (Slovenia) Lema Racing | Porsche Cayman GT4 Clubsport MR | 114 | (Slovenia) Mathias Lodi | **GT4** | 2–4 |
| (Slovenia) Lema Racing | Porsche Cayman GT4 Clubsport MR | 114 | (Slovenia) Grega Šimunovič | **GT4** | 2–4 |
| (Slovenia) Lema Racing | Renault Clio Cup | 333 | (Croatia) Igor Tomljanovic | **TC-1.6** | 4 |
| (Slovakia) Trevor Racing | BMW M6 GT3 | 24 | (Slovakia) Gregor Zsigo | **GT3** | 1–4 |
| (Slovakia) Trevor Racing | BMW M4 GT4 | 40 | (Hungary) Ferenc Ficza | **GT4** | 1–4 |
| (Czech Republic) Buggyra Zero Mileage Racing | Mercedes-AMG GT3 Evo | 29 | (Czech Republic) Aliyyah Koloc | **GT3** | 1–2 |
| (Czech Republic) Buggyra Zero Mileage Racing | Mercedes-AMG GT3 Evo | 29 | (Czech Republic) David Vršecký | **GT3** | 1–2 |
| (Czech Republic) Buggyra Zero Mileage Racing | Renault Clio Cup | 65 | (Czech Republic) Yasmeen Koloc | **TC-1.6** | 1–2 |
| (Czech Republic) Buggyra Zero Mileage Racing | Renault Clio Cup | 65 | (France) Teo Calvet | **TC-1.6** | 1 |
| (United Arab Emirates) Buggyra Racing | Mercedes-AMG GT4 | 29 | (Czech Republic) Aliyyah Koloc | **GT4** | 4 |
| (United Arab Emirates) Buggyra Racing | Mercedes-AMG GT4 | 29 | (Czech Republic) David Vršecký | **GT4** | 4 |
| (United Arab Emirates) Buggyra Racing | Renault Clio Cup | 65 | (United Arab Emirates) Yasmeen Koloc | **TC-1.6** | 4 |
| (Czech Republic) GT2 Motorsport | Porsche 991.2 GT3 Cup | 85 | (Czech Republic) Petr Brecka | **GTC** | 4 |
| (Slovakia) Horňák-Aditis | Audi RS 3 LMS TCR | 38 | (Czech Republic) Radim Adámek | **TC-3.5** | 1 |
| (Slovakia) Horňák-Aditis | Audi RS 3 LMS TCR | 38 | (Slovakia) Miroslav Horňák | **TC-3.5** | 1 |
| (Slovakia) Horňák-Aditis | Audi RS 3 LMS TCR | 96 | (Czech Republic) Petr Fulín Jr. | **TC-3.5** | 1 |
| (Poland) BTC Maszyny Racing | Audi RS 3 LMS TCR | 53 | (Poland) Bartosz Groszek | **TC-3.5** | 1–2 |
| (Czech Republic) Duck Racing | Lamborghini Huracán Super Trofeo Evo | 100 | (Czech Republic) Bolek Waszek | **GTC** | 2–4 |
| (Czech Republic) Duck Racing | Lamborghini Huracán Super Trofeo Evo | 100 | (Czech Republic) Dennis Waszek | **GTC** | 2–4 |
| (Hungary) Zengő Motorsport Services Kft | CUPRA León TCR | 999 | (Hungary) Gábor Kismarty-Lechner | **TC-3.5** | 1 |
D5
| (Poland) Psofix | Radical SR3 RSX | 2 | (Poland) Jakub Litwin | 1–4 | |
| (Poland) Psofix | Radical SR3 RSX | 2 | (Poland) Jacek Zielonka | 1–4 | |
| (Czech Republic) Janík Motorsport | Norma M30 | 3 | (Czech Republic) Tomáš Konvička | 1 | |
| (Czech Republic) Janík Motorsport | Norma M30 | 3 | (Hungary) Balázs Volentér | 1 | |
| (Slovakia) ARC Bratislava | Ligier JS P2 | 4 | (Slovakia) Miro Konôpka | 1–2 | |
| (Slovakia) ARC Bratislava | Ginetta-Juno P3-15 | 6 | (Slovakia) Matej Konôpka | 2 | |

| Icon | Class |
Car
| GT3 | GT3 |
| GT4 | GT4 |
| GTC | GTC |
| GT+3.5 | GT+3.5 |
| TC-3.5 | TC-3.5 |
| TC-1.6 | TC-1.6 |

=== Results ===
Bold indicates overall winner.

| Round | Circuit | Pole position | Fastest lap | GT3 Winning Team | GT4 Winning Team | GTC Winning Team | TC-3.5 Winning Team | TC-1.6 Winning Team | D5 Winning Team |
| Round | Circuit | Pole position | Fastest lap | GT3 Winning Driver(s) | GT4 Winning Driver(s) | GTC Winning Driver(s) | TC-3.5 Winning Driver(s) | TC-1.6 Winning Driver(s) | D5 Winning Driver(s) |
|---|---|---|---|---|---|---|---|---|---|
| 1 | Hungaroring, Budapest, Hungary | (Czech Republic) No. 3 Janík Motorsport | (Czech Republic) No. 3 Janík Motorsport | (Poland) No. 77 Olimp Racing | (Czech Republic) No. 8 RTR Projects | (Hungary) No. 7 BOVI Motorsport | (Poland) No. 53 BTC Maszyny Racing | (Czech Republic) No. 65 Buggyra Zero Mileage Racing | **(Czech Republic) No. 3 Janík Motorsport** |
| 1 | Hungaroring, Budapest, Hungary | (Czech Republic) Tomáš Konvička (Hungary) Balázs Volentér | (Czech Republic) Tomáš Konvička (Hungary) Balázs Volentér | (Poland) Marcin Jedlinski | (Hungary) Erik Janiš (Czech Republic) Matěj Pavlíček | (Hungary) Bódis Kálmán | (Poland) Bartosz Groszek | (France) Teo Calvet (Czech Republic) Yasmeen Koloc | **(Czech Republic) Tomáš Konvička** **(Hungary) Balázs Volentér** |
| 2 | Automotodróm Slovakia Ring, Orechová Potôň, Slovakia | (Slovakia) No. 4 ARC Bratislava | (Slovakia) No. 4 ARC Bratislava | (Poland) No. 77 Olimp Racing | (Czech Republic) No. 8 RTR Projects | (Czech Republic) No. 33 RTR Projects | (Poland) No. 53 BTC Maszyny Racing | (Czech Republic) No. 65 Buggyra Zero Mileage Racing | **(Slovakia) No. 4 ARC Bratislava** |
| 2 | Automotodróm Slovakia Ring, Orechová Potôň, Slovakia | (Slovakia) Miro Konôpka | (Slovakia) Miro Konôpka | (Poland) Marcin Jedlinski | (Hungary) Erik Janiš (Czech Republic) Matěj Pavlíček | (Czech Republic) Tomáš Miniberger (Czech Republic) Sergej Pavlovec | (Poland) Bartosz Groszek | (Czech Republic) Yasmeen Koloc | **(Slovakia) Miro Konôpka** |
| 3 | Tor Poznań, Poznań, Poland | | | | | | | | |
| 4 | Automotodrom Grobnik, Rijeka, Croatia | (Poland) No. 2 Psofix | | (Slovakia) **No. 24 Trevor Racing** | (Czech Republic) No. 8 RTR Projects | (Czech Republic) No. 33 RTR Projects | No entries | (United Arab Emirates) No. 65 Buggyra Racing | (Poland) No. 2 Psofix |
| 4 | Automotodrom Grobnik, Rijeka, Croatia | (Poland) Jacek Zielonka (Poland) Jakub Litwin | | (Slovakia) **Gregor Zsigo** (Czech Republic) **Dennis Waszek** | (Czech Republic) Matěj Pavlíček (Hungary) Erik Janiš | (Czech Republic) Tomáš Miniberger | No entries | (United Arab Emirates) Yasmeen Koloc | (Poland) Jacek Zielonka (Poland) Jakub Litwin |
| 5 | Automotodróm Slovakia Ring, Orechová Potôň, Slovakia | | | | | | | | |
| 6 | Automotodrom Brno, Brno, Czech Republic | | | | | | | | |

== Clio Cup ==
=== Teams and drivers ===
| Team | Car | No. | Drivers | Class | | Rounds |
D4
| (Slovenia) Lema Racing | Renault Clio Cup | 5 | (Slovenia) Zoran Poglajen | TWC1 | | 1 |
| (Slovenia) Lema Racing | Renault Clio Cup | 21 | (Slovenia) Miha Primozic | TWC1 | | 1, 4 |
| (Slovenia) Lema Racing | Renault Clio Cup | 24 | (Slovenia) Mark Mramor | TWC1 | J | 1-2 |
| (Slovenia) Lema Racing | Renault Clio Cup | 24 | (Slovenia) Predrag Šainovič | TWC1 | | 4 |
| (Slovenia) Lema Racing | Renault Clio Cup | 125 | (Slovenia) Sandi Jeram | TWC1 | | 1–2, 4 |
| (Slovenia) Lema Racing | Renault Clio Cup | 333 | (Croatia) Igor Tomljanovic | TWC1 | | 4 |
| (Hungary) Z.S.P. Motorsport Kft. | Renault Clio Cup | 7 | (Hungary) Balint Hatvani | TWC1 | | 2, 4 |
| (Hungary) Z.S.P. Motorsport Kft. | Renault Clio Cup | 27 | (Hungary) Levente Losonczy | TWC1 | J | 1–2, 4 |
| (Croatia) ASK Kastavac | Renault Clio Cup | 11 | (Croatia) Rajmond Terčić | TWC1 | | 4 |
| (Croatia) AK Zagorje | Renault Clio Cup | 12 | (Croatia) Vedran Šipoš | TWC1 | | 1 |
| (Slovakia) RS-Team | Mazda MX-5 (ND) | 21 | (Slovakia) Simon Sikhart | TC-2.0 | | 2 |
| (Slovakia) RS-Team | Honda Civic Type R | 213 | (Slovakia) Marijan Rajnoha | TC-2.0 | | 2 |
| (Czech Republic) Carpek Service | Renault Clio Cup | 25 | (Sweden) Filip Sandström | TWC1 | | 1–2, 4 |
| (Czech Republic) Carpek Service | Renault Clio Cup | 47 | (Sweden) Erik Bertilsson | TWC1 | J | 1–2, 4 |
| (Czech Republic) Carpek Service | Renault Clio Cup | 51 | (Finland) Yuuso Panttila | TWC1 | | 2, 4 |
| (Czech Republic) Carpek Service | Renault Clio Cup | 52 | (Czech Republic) Richar Meixner | TWC1 | | 1–2, 4 |
| (Slovenia) AK Lamko | Peugeot 206 RC | 30 | (Slovenia) Marko Pirman | TC-2.0 | | 2 |
| (Croatia) AK Buzet Autosport | Renault Clio Cup | 55 | (Croatia) Valter Nežić | TWC1 | | 1, 4 |
| (Czech Republic) Buggyra Zero Mileage Racing | Renault Clio Cup | 65 | (Czech Republic) Yasmeen Koloc | TWC1 | J | 1-2 |
| (United Arab Emirates) Buggyra Racing | Renault Clio Cup | 65 | (United Arab Emirates) Yasmeen Koloc | TWC1 | J | 4 |
| (Croatia) AK Istra Racing Team Pazin | Renault Clio Cup | 69 | (Croatia) Ivan Gustin | TWC1 | | 1–2, 4 |
| (Croatia) Cobra Virovitica | Renault Clio Cup | 333 | (Croatia) Igor Tomljanovic | TWC1 | | 1-2 |
| (Hungary) GFS Racing Team | Suzuki Swift 1.6 | 505 | (Hungary) Balázs Hartmann | TC-1.6 | J | 1 |
| (Hungary) GFS Racing Team | Suzuki Swift 1.4 Turbo | 505 | (Hungary) Balázs Hartmann | TC-2.0 | J | 2, 4 |
| (Hungary) GFS Racing Team | Suzuki Swift 1.4 Turbo | 507 | (Hungary) Gergo Racz | TC-2.0 | | 2 |
| (Poland) Darek Nowicki Racing | Suzuki Swift Sport | 516 | (Poland) Julia Schayer | TC-1.6 | | 1 |
| (Hungary) MGAMS Kft. | Mazda MX-5 (NB) | 546 | (Hungary) Tamás Herczeg | TWC5 | | 1 |
| (Hungary) MGAMS Kft. | Mazda MX-5 (NB) | 575 | (Hungary) Domonkos Dely | TWC5 | | 1 |
| (Hungary) Proex Motorsport | Mazda MX-5 (NB) | 577 | (Hungary) Dr. Gábor Grigalek | TWC5 | | 1 |
| (Slovakia) ARC Bratislava | Mazda MX-5 (NA) | 926 | (Slovakia) David Němček | TWC5 | | 1 |
| (Slovakia) ARC Bratislava | Mazda MX-5 (NA) | 926 | (Slovakia) Zdeno Mikuláško | TWC5 | | 2 |
| (Slovakia) ARC Bratislava | Mazda MX-5 (NA) | 929 | (Slovakia) Ondrej Fekete | TWC5 | | 1-2 |
| (Slovakia) ARC Bratislava | Mazda MX-5 (NA) | 969 | (Slovakia) Michaela Dorčíková | TWC5 | | 1-2 |
| (Slovakia) ARC Bratislava | Mazda MX-5 (NA) | 996 | (Slovakia) Jan Žgrafčak | TWC5 | | 2 |
| (Slovakia) ARC Bratislava | Mazda MX-5 (NA) | 999 | (Slovakia) Juraj Kornhauser | TWC5 | | 2 |
Group 1
| (Croatia) AK Makarska | Peugeot 106 | 29 | (Croatia) Frane Jukić | Class 3 | | 1 |
| (Croatia) AK Ina Delta | Renault Twingo | 90 | (Croatia) Hrvoje Vukoje | Class 3 | | 1 |
| (Croatia) AK Dubrovnik Racing | Citroën AX GTI | 92 | (Croatia) Mirko Pendo | Class 2 | | 1 |
| (Croatia) Saint Christopher Racing Team | Škoda Fabia | 101 | (Croatia) Sandro Babić | Class 2 | | 1 |
| (Croatia) Saint Christopher Racing Team | Volkswagen Polo | 108 | (Croatia) Nino Jeličić | Class 1 | | 1 |
| (Croatia) Auto Klub Trogir | Volkswagen Lupo | 118 | (Croatia) Robert Antunović | Class 3 | | 1 |
Group 2
| (Croatia) Saint Christopher Racing Team | Suzuki Swift | 17 | (Croatia) Grega Šimunovič | Class 6 | | 1 |
| (Croatia) AKK DS Racing Prelog | Toyota Yaris 1.5 TYC | 60 | (Croatia) Bruno Filipi | Class 6 | | 1 |
| (Croatia) AKK DS Racing Prelog | Toyota Yaris 1.5 TYC | 66 | (Croatia) Vladimir Jaklin | Class 6 | | 1 |
| (Croatia) AKK DS Racing Prelog | Toyota Yaris 1.5 TYC | 88 | (Croatia) Tomislav Jaklin | Class 6 | | 1 |

| Icon | Class |
Car
| **TWC1** | TWC1 (Clio Cup) |
| **TWC5** | TWC5 (MX-5 Cup) |
| **TC-2.0** | TC-2.0 |
| **TC-1.6** | TC-1.6 |
Driver
| **J** | Junior |

=== Results ===
Bold indicates overall winner.

| Round | | Circuit | Pole position | Fastest lap | Clio Cup Winning Driver | MX-5 Cup Winning Driver | TC-2.0 Winning Driver | TC-1.6 Winning Driver | Group 1 Winning Driver | Group 2 Winning Driver |
|---|---|---|---|---|---|---|---|---|---|---|
| 1 | 1 | Hungaroring, Budapest, Hungary | (Sweden) Filip Sandström | (Sweden) Filip Sandström | (Sweden) Filip Sandström | (Slovakia) David Němček | No entries | (Poland) Julia Schayer | (Croatia) Sandro Babić | (Croatia) Tomislav Jaklin |
| 1 | 2 | Hungaroring, Budapest, Hungary | | (Sweden) Filip Sandström | (Sweden) Filip Sandström | (Slovakia) David Němček | No entries | (Poland) Julia Schayer | (Croatia) Nino Jeličić | (Croatia) Grega Šimunovič |
| 2 | 3 | Automotodróm Slovakia Ring, Orechová Potôň, Slovakia | (Sweden) Filip Sandström | (Finland) Yuuso Panttila | (Sweden) Filip Sandström | (Slovakia) Michaela Dorčíková | (Slovakia) Simon Sikhart | No entries | | |
| 2 | 4 | Automotodróm Slovakia Ring, Orechová Potôň, Slovakia | | (Sweden) Filip Sandström | (Sweden) Filip Sandström | (Slovakia) Michaela Dorčíková | (Hungary) Gergo Racz | No entries | | |
| 3 | 5 | Tor Poznań, Poznań, Poland | | | | | | | | |
| 3 | 6 | Tor Poznań, Poznań, Poland | | | | | | | | |
| 4 | 7 | Automotodrom Grobnik, Rijeka, Croatia | (Hungary) Balint Hatvani | (Sweden) Filip Sandström | (Sweden) Filip Sandström | No entries | | No entries | | |
| 4 | 8 | Automotodrom Grobnik, Rijeka, Croatia | | | (Sweden) Erik Bertilsson | No entries | | No entries | | |
| 5 | 9 | Automotodróm Slovakia Ring, Orechová Potôň, Slovakia | | | | | | | | |
| 5 | 10 | Automotodróm Slovakia Ring, Orechová Potôň, Slovakia | | | | | | | | |
| 6 | 11 | Automotodrom Brno, Brno, Czech Republic | | | | | | | | |
| 6 | 12 | Automotodrom Brno, Brno, Czech Republic | | | | | | | | |

== Twingo Cup ==
=== Teams and drivers ===
| Team | No. | Drivers | Class | Rounds |
|---|---|---|---|---|
| (Slovenia) Lema Racing | 1 | (Slovenia) Bojan Šeme | | 1 |
| (Slovenia) Lema Racing | 6 | (Serbia) Mateja Soldat | | 1 |
| (Slovenia) Lema Racing | 7 | (Slovenia) Nik Štefančič | J | 1 |
| (Slovenia) Lema Racing | 11 | (Slovenia) Tom A. Gruenfeld | | 1 |
| (Slovenia) Lema Racing | 13 | (Slovenia) Gregor Bovha | | 1 |
| (Slovenia) Lema Racing | 15 | (Slovenia) Matej Ivanuša | | 1 |
| (Slovenia) Lema Racing | 16 | (Slovenia) Luka Glazer | | 1 |
| (Slovenia) Lema Racing | 19 | (Slovenia) Urban Jelovčan | | 1 |
| (Slovenia) Lema Racing | 222 | (Slovenia) Rok Cerar | | 1 |
| (Slovenia) Lema Racing | 333 | (Slovenia) Luka Grm | | 1 |
| (North Macedonia) AK Reno Sport | 9 | (North Macedonia) Emil Nacka | | 1 |
| (North Macedonia) AK Reno Sport | 22 | (North Macedonia) David Malinkovski | | 1 |
| (North Macedonia) AK Reno Sport | 28 | (North Macedonia) Ivan Stefanovski | | 1 |
| (North Macedonia) AK Reno Sport | 33 | (North Macedonia) Martin Kostokovski | J | 1 |
| (North Macedonia) AK Reno Sport | 50 | (North Macedonia) Slobodan Trajkovski | | 1 |
| (North Macedonia) AK Reno Sport | 62 | (North Macedonia) Nedad Kostovski | | 1 |
| (North Macedonia) AK Reno Sport | 77 | (North Macedonia) Milan Gjorgjevski | | 1 |
| (Serbia) ASK EKO Racing | 10 | (Serbia) Mihailo Milenković | | 1 |
| (Serbia) ASK EKO Racing | 142 | (Serbia) Mihajlo Mladenović | J | 1 |
| (Slovenia) AK Sigma Sport | 14 | (Slovenia) David Stušek | | 1 |
| (North Macedonia) AKK Swift Racing | 27 | (North Macedonia) Vladimir Treneski | | 1 |
| (North Macedonia) AKK Swift Racing | 80 | (North Macedonia) Angelche Stojkovski | | 1 |
| (Slovenia) Autosport Jazon | 81 | (Slovenia) Nejc Vrhovec | | 1 |
| (Hungary) NNR Team | 95 | (Hungary) Lantos Szabolcs | J | 1 |
| (Slovenia) AK Lamko | 111 | (Slovenia) Dejan Robida | | 1 |

=== Results ===
| Rnd. | | Circuit | Pole position | Fastest lap | Winning driver | Winning team |
|---|---|---|---|---|---|---|
| 1 | 1 | Hungaroring, Budapest, Hungary | (Slovenia) Nik Štefančič | (Serbia) Mihajlo Mladenović | (Slovenia) Nik Štefančič | (Slovenia) Lema Racing |
| 1 | 2 | Hungaroring, Budapest, Hungary | | (Slovenia) Matej Ivanuša | (Slovenia) Matej Ivanuša | (Slovenia) Lema Racing |
| 2 | 3 | Automotodróm Slovakia Ring, Orechová Potôň, Slovakia | | | | |
| 2 | 4 | Automotodróm Slovakia Ring, Orechová Potôň, Slovakia | | | | |
| 3 | 5 | Automotodrom Grobnik, Rijeka, Croatia | | (Slovenia) Luka Glazer | (Serbia) Mihajlo Mladenović | (Serbia) ASK EKO Racing |
| 3 | 6 | Automotodrom Grobnik, Rijeka, Croatia | | | (Serbia) Mihajlo Mladenović | (Serbia) ASK EKO Racing |
| 4 | 7 | Automotodróm Slovakia Ring, Orechová Potôň, Slovakia | | | | |
| 4 | 8 | Automotodróm Slovakia Ring, Orechová Potôň, Slovakia | | | | |
| 5 | 9 | Ušće Street Circuit, Ušće, Serbia | | | | |
| 5 | 10 | Ušće Street Circuit, Ušće, Serbia | | | | |
| 6 | 11 | Serres Racing Circuit, Serres, Greece | | | | |
| 6 | 12 | Serres Racing Circuit, Serres, Greece | | | | |

== D2 Formula ==
=== Teams and drivers ===
| Team | Car | No. | Drivers | Class | Rounds |
E2-2.0
| (Czech Republic) Effective Racing | Dallara F318 | 7 | (Czech Republic) Vladimír Netušil | | 1, 4 |
| (Czech Republic) Effective Racing | Dallara F318 | 27 | (Czech Republic) Vladimír Netušil | | 5–6 |
| (Germany) Rennsport Wachter | Dallara F308 | 24 | (Germany) Christian Wachter | | 1 |
| (Hungary) Magyar Racing Team | Tatuus N.T07 | 46 | (Hungary) János Magyar | | 1, 5–6 |
| (Serbia) AMCC ASU NV Racing | Dallara 320 | 212 | (Serbia) Paolo Brajnik | | 1, 4 |
| (Czech Republic) HKC Racing | Tatuus FR2.0/13 | TBA | (Czech Republic) Jan Matyáš | | 6 |
| (Germany) Speed Center | Formula Renault | 9 | (Switzerland) Luca Steffen | | 5–6 |
| (Germany) Speed Center | Formula Renault | 18 | (Austria) Walter Stending | | 5 |
F3
| (Hungary) F-Racing 2000 Kft - Gender Racing Team | Dallara F313 | 13 | (Hungary) Olivér Michl | | 1 |
| (Hungary) F-Racing 2000 Kft - Gender Racing Team | Dallara F313 | 12 | (Slovakia) Nikolas Szabó | | 5–6 |
| (Germany) Speed Center | Dallara F317 | 13 | (Austria) Philipp Todtenhaupt | | 5–6 |
| (Czech Republic) GT2 Motorsport | Dallara F308 | 14 | (Czech Republic) Václav Šafář | | 5 |
| (Austria) Franz Wöss Racing | Dallara F308 | 15 | (Austria) Daniel Tapinos | | 1, 6 |
| (Austria) Franz Wöss Racing | Dallara F316 | 17 | (Austria) Stefan Fürtbauer | **J** | 1, 4–6 |
| (Austria) Franz Wöss Racing | Dallara F309 | 11 | (Italy) Luca Iannaccone | | 4, 6 |
| (Austria) Franz Wöss Racing | Dallara F309 | 10 | (Italy) Luca Iannaccone | | 5 |
| (Austria) Team Hoffmann Racing | Dallara F314 | 20 | (Hungary) Benjámin Berta | **J** | 5–6 |
| (Germany) Vogtland Racing Team | Dallara F308 | 22 | (Austria) Danny Luderer | | 1, 4 |
| (Czech Republic) HKC Racing | Dallara F308 | 62 | (Czech Republic) Matěj Kácovský | **J** | 1 |
| (Italy) Facondini Motorsport | Dallara F308 | 82 | (Italy) Luca Iannaccone | | 1 |
F4
| (Slovakia) Procar Motorsport | Tatuus T014 | 1 | (Austria) Patrick Schober | **J** | 1, 4–6 |
| (Hungary) F-Racing 2000 Kft - Gender Racing Team | Tatuus T014 | 44 | (Hungary) Benjámin Berta | | 1, 4 |

=== Results ===
Bold indicates overall winner.

| Rnd. | | Circuit | Pole position | Fastest lap | Winning E2 | Winning F3 | Winning F4 |
|---|---|---|---|---|---|---|---|
| 1 | 1 | Hungaroring, Budapest, Hungary | (Serbia) Paolo Brajnik | (Serbia) Paolo Brajnik | **(Serbia) Paolo Brajnik** | (Hungary) Olivér Michl | (Hungary) Benjámin Berta |
| 1 | 2 | Hungaroring, Budapest, Hungary | | (Serbia) Paolo Brajnik | **(Serbia) Paolo Brajnik** | (Czech Republic) Matěj Kácovský | (Hungary) Benjámin Berta |
| 2 | 3 | Automotodróm Slovakia Ring, Orechová Potôň, Slovakia | —N/a | | | | |
| 2 | 4 | Automotodróm Slovakia Ring, Orechová Potôň, Slovakia | —N/a | | | | |
| 3 | 5 | Tor Poznań, Poznań, Poland | —N/a | | | | |
| 3 | 6 | Tor Poznań, Poznań, Poland | —N/a | | | | |
| 4 | 7 | Automotodrom Grobnik, Rijeka, Croatia | (Serbia) Paolo Brajnik | (Serbia) Paolo Brajnik | **(Serbia) Paolo Brajnik** | (Austria) Danny Luderer | (Austria) Patrick Schober |
| 4 | 8 | Automotodrom Grobnik, Rijeka, Croatia | (Serbia) Paolo Brajnik | (Serbia) Paolo Brajnik | **(Serbia) Paolo Brajnik** | (Austria) Stefan Fürtbauer | (Hungary) Benjámin Berta |
| 5 | 9 | Automotodróm Slovakia Ring, Orechová Potôň, Slovakia | (Czech Republic) Vladimír Netušil | (Hungary) Benjámin Berta | **(Czech Republic) Vladimír Netušil** | (Hungary) Benjámin Berta | (Austria) Patrick Schober |
| 5 | 10 | Automotodróm Slovakia Ring, Orechová Potôň, Slovakia | (Hungary) Benjámin Berta | (Hungary) Benjámin Berta | (Hungary) János Magyar | **(Hungary) Benjámin Berta** | (Austria) Patrick Schober |
| 6 | 11 | Automotodrom Brno, Brno, Czech Republic | (Hungary) Benjámin Berta | (Czech Republic) Vladimír Netušil | **(Czech Republic) Vladimír Netušil** | (Hungary) Benjámin Berta | (Austria) Patrick Schober |
| 6 | 12 | Automotodrom Brno, Brno, Czech Republic | (Hungary) Benjámin Berta | (Hungary) Benjámin Berta | (Czech Republic) Vladimír Netušil | **(Hungary) Benjámin Berta** | (Czech Republic) Vojtěch Birgus |
