= 2021 European Truck Racing Championship =

Motor-racing competition

The 2021 European Truck Racing Championship was a motor-racing championship using highly tuned tractor units. It was the 37th year of the championship. A seven round calendar was announced on November 17, 2020, which was slated to begin May 22, 2021 at the Misano World Circuit in Italy and conclude with October 3 at the Circuito del Jarama in Spain. However, due to continued restrictions resulting from the COVID-19 pandemic, the round at Misano was postponed to the end of the season, moving the round at the Hungaroring in Hungary on June 12 as the first race of the season.

For the 2021 season, began a program promoting energy sustainability by having all competitors use biodiesel, making it the first FIA sanctioned series to utilize 100% sustainable fuel sources. TotalEnergies became the exclusive fuel provider for the series and provided competitors with Hydrotreated vegetable oil as fuel.

Norbert Kiss won his third championship in the series, while Shane Brereton took his second victory in the Goodyear Cup.

== Calendar ==
A 7 round championship was announced on November 17, 2020. The Slovakia Ring fell off the schedule after having appeared in several previous seasons. The original schedule was slated to begin at the Misano World Circuit, but was postponed, leaving the Hungaroring as the opening round.

The round at the Nürburgring was expanded to hold 6 races instead of the standard 4 race format, with 3 races held each day between July 17 and 18. However, the event was cancelled days before it was scheduled due to major infrastructure damage in the surrounding area caused by severe flooding.

Round		Circuit	Date
1	R1	(Hungary) Hungaroring, Mogyoród	June 12
1	R2	(Hungary) Hungaroring, Mogyoród	June 12
1	R3	(Hungary) Hungaroring, Mogyoród	June 13
1	R4	(Hungary) Hungaroring, Mogyoród	June 13
2	R1	(Czech Republic) Autodrom Most, Most	August 28
2	R2	(Czech Republic) Autodrom Most, Most	August 28
2	R3	(Czech Republic) Autodrom Most, Most	August 29
2	R4	(Czech Republic) Autodrom Most, Most	August 29
3	R1	(Belgium) Circuit Zolder, Heusden-Zolder	September 11
3	R2	(Belgium) Circuit Zolder, Heusden-Zolder	September 11
3	R3	(Belgium) Circuit Zolder, Heusden-Zolder	September 12
3	R4	(Belgium) Circuit Zolder, Heusden-Zolder	September 12
4	R1	(France) Bugatti Circuit, Le Mans	September 25
4	R2	(France) Bugatti Circuit, Le Mans	September 25
4	R3	(France) Bugatti Circuit, Le Mans	September 26
4	R4	(France) Bugatti Circuit, Le Mans	September 26
5	R1	(Spain) Circuito del Jarama, San Sebastián de los Reyes	October 2
5	R2	(Spain) Circuito del Jarama, San Sebastián de los Reyes	October 2
5	R3	(Spain) Circuito del Jarama, San Sebastián de los Reyes	October 3
5	R4	(Spain) Circuito del Jarama, San Sebastián de los Reyes	October 3
6	R1	(Italy) Misano World Circuit, Misano Adriatico	October 16
6	R2	(Italy) Misano World Circuit, Misano Adriatico	October 16
6	R3	(Italy) Misano World Circuit, Misano Adriatico	October 17
6	R4	(Italy) Misano World Circuit, Misano Adriatico	October 17

== Teams and drivers ==
The following table lists all teams and drivers who competed during the 2021 season.

Team	Manufacturer	No.	Drivers	Rounds	Class
(United Kingdom) Anderson Racing	MAN	33	(United Kingdom) Jamie Anderson	All	G
(United Kingdom) Apollo Tyres TOR Truck Racing	MAN	17	(United Kingdom) Shane Brereton	All	G
(Czech Republic) Buggyra Racing	Freightliner	20	(France) Téo Calvet	1−3, 5–6	G
(Czech Republic) Buggyra Racing	Freightliner	29	(United Arab Emirates) Aliyyah Koloc	1−3, 5–6	G
(Czech Republic) Buggyra Racing	Freightliner	55	(Czech Republic) Adam Lacko	All	
(Germany) Don't Touch Racing	Iveco	11	(Germany) André Kursim	All	
(Germany) Heinrich Clemens-Hecker	MAN	25	(Germany) Heinrich Clemens-Hecker	1−5	G
(France) Lion Truck Racing	MAN	66	(France) Anthony Janiec	2, 5–6	
(Spain) Luis Recuenco	MAN	64	(Spain) Luis Recuenco	3–4	G
(United Kingdom) MV Commercial Truck Racing	MAN	86	(United Kingdom) Thomas O'Rourke	1	G
(United Kingdom) MV Commercial Truck Racing	MAN	86	(United Kingdom) Luke Garrett	2–5	G
(Germany) Reinert Racing	Iveco	77	(Germany) René Reinert	All	
(Hungary) Révész Racing	MAN	41	(Hungary) Norbert Kiss	All	
(Germany) SL Trucksport	MAN	30	(Germany) Sascha Lenz	All	
(Germany) T Sport Bernau	MAN	23	(Spain) Antonio Albacete	All	
(Germany) Tankpool 24 Racing	Scania	24	(Germany) Steffen Faas	All	G
(Germany) Team Hahn Racing	Iveco	1	(Germany) Jochen Hahn	All	
(Germany) Team Hahn Racing	Iveco	22	(Germany) Lukas Hahn	2, 6	G
(Germany) Team Schwabentruck	Iveco	44	(Germany) Stephanie Halm	All	
Entries ineligible to score points
(Portugal) Reboconorte Racing Truck Team	MAN	14	(Portugal) José Rodrigues	5	G
(United Kingdom) Smith Truck Sport	MAN	81	(United Kingdom) Ryan Smith	6	

Icon	Class
G	Goodyear Cup

== Results and standings ==
=== Season summary ===
Round		Circuit	Pole position	Fastest lap	Winning driver	Winning team	Goodyear Cup winner
1	R1	(Hungary) Hungaroring, Mogyoród	(Hungary) Norbert Kiss	(Hungary) Norbert Kiss	(Germany) Sascha Lenz	(Germany) SL Trucksport	(United Kingdom) Jamie Anderson
1	R2	(Hungary) Hungaroring, Mogyoród	Race cancelled due to barrier damage				
1	R3	(Hungary) Hungaroring, Mogyoród	(Hungary) Norbert Kiss	(Hungary) Norbert Kiss	(Hungary) Norbert Kiss	(Hungary) Révész Racing	(United Kingdom) Shane Brereton
1	R4	(Hungary) Hungaroring, Mogyoród		(Hungary) Norbert Kiss	(Hungary) Norbert Kiss	(Hungary) Révész Racing	(United Kingdom) Shane Brereton
2	R1	(Czech Republic) Autodrom Most, Most	(Hungary) Norbert Kiss	(Germany) Sascha Lenz	(Hungary) Norbert Kiss	(Hungary) Révész Racing	(France) Téo Calvet
2	R2	(Czech Republic) Autodrom Most, Most		(Hungary) Norbert Kiss	(Germany) André Kursim	(Germany) Don't Touch Racing	(France) Téo Calvet
2	R3	(Czech Republic) Autodrom Most, Most	(Germany) Jochen Hahn	(Hungary) Norbert Kiss	(Hungary) Norbert Kiss	(Hungary) Révész Racing	(France) Téo Calvet
2	R4	(Czech Republic) Autodrom Most, Most		(Germany) Sascha Lenz	(Germany) Sascha Lenz	(Germany) SL Trucksport	(United Kingdom) Shane Brereton
3	R1	(Belgium) Circuit Zolder, Heusden-Zolder	(Hungary) Norbert Kiss	(Hungary) Norbert Kiss	(Hungary) Norbert Kiss	(Hungary) Révész Racing	(France) Téo Calvet
3	R2	(Belgium) Circuit Zolder, Heusden-Zolder		(Hungary) Norbert Kiss	(Czech Republic) Adam Lacko	(Czech Republic) Buggyra Racing	(France) Téo Calvet
3	R3	(Belgium) Circuit Zolder, Heusden-Zolder	(Germany) Jochen Hahn	(Hungary) Norbert Kiss	(Germany) Jochen Hahn	(Germany) Team Hahn Racing	(France) Téo Calvet
3	R4	(Belgium) Circuit Zolder, Heusden-Zolder		(Hungary) Norbert Kiss	(Hungary) Norbert Kiss	(Hungary) Révész Racing	(France) Téo Calvet
4	R1	(France) Bugatti Circuit, Le Mans	(Germany) Jochen Hahn	(Hungary) Norbert Kiss	(Germany) Jochen Hahn	(Germany) Team Hahn Racing	(United Kingdom) Shane Brereton
4	R2	(France) Bugatti Circuit, Le Mans		(Hungary) Norbert Kiss	(Hungary) Norbert Kiss	(Hungary) Révész Racing	(United Kingdom) Jamie Anderson
4	R3	(France) Bugatti Circuit, Le Mans	(Hungary) Norbert Kiss	(Hungary) Norbert Kiss	(Hungary) Norbert Kiss	(Hungary) Révész Racing	(United Kingdom) Shane Brereton
4	R4	(France) Bugatti Circuit, Le Mans		(Hungary) Norbert Kiss	(Germany) André Kursim	(Germany) Don't Touch Racing	(United Kingdom) Shane Brereton
5	R1	(Spain) Circuito del Jarama, San Sebastián de los Reyes	(Hungary) Norbert Kiss	(Hungary) Norbert Kiss	(Hungary) Norbert Kiss	(Hungary) Révész Racing	(United Kingdom) Shane Brereton
5	R2	(Spain) Circuito del Jarama, San Sebastián de los Reyes		(Hungary) Norbert Kiss	(Germany) André Kursim	(Germany) Don't Touch Racing	(France) Téo Calvet
5	R3	(Spain) Circuito del Jarama, San Sebastián de los Reyes	(Hungary) Norbert Kiss	(Hungary) Norbert Kiss	(Hungary) Norbert Kiss	(Hungary) Révész Racing	(France) Téo Calvet
5	R4	(Spain) Circuito del Jarama, San Sebastián de los Reyes		(Spain) Antonio Albacete	(France) Téo Calvet	(Czech Republic) Buggyra Racing	(France) Téo Calvet
6	R1	(Italy) Misano World Circuit, Misano Adriatico	(Hungary) Norbert Kiss	(Germany) Sascha Lenz	(Germany) Sascha Lenz	(Germany) SL Trucksport	(France) Téo Calvet
6	R2	(Italy) Misano World Circuit, Misano Adriatico		(United Kingdom) Jamie Anderson	(Germany) Jochen Hahn	(Germany) Team Hahn Racing	(France) Téo Calvet
6	R3	(Italy) Misano World Circuit, Misano Adriatico	(Hungary) Norbert Kiss	(Hungary) Norbert Kiss	(Hungary) Norbert Kiss	(Hungary) Révész Racing	(Germany) Lukas Hahn
6	R4	(Italy) Misano World Circuit, Misano Adriatico		(Germany) Sascha Lenz	(Germany) Sascha Lenz	(Germany) SL Trucksport	(Germany) Lukas Hahn

=== Drivers standings ===
At each race, points are awarded to the top ten classified finishers using the following structure:

Position	**1st**	**2nd**	**3rd**	**4th**	**5th**	**6th**	**7th**	**8th**	**9th**	**10th**
Points (races 1 and 3)	20	15	12	10	8	6	4	3	2	1
Points (races 2 and 4)	10	9	8	7	6	5	4	3	2	1

Pos.	Driver	HUN^{1} (Hungary)				MOS (Czech Republic)				ZOL (Belgium)				LMS (France)				JAR (Spain)				MIS (Italy)				Pts.
1	(Hungary) Norbert Kiss	**Ret**	C	**1**	1	**1**	3	1	5	**1**	8	4	1	3	1	**1**	5	**1**	4	**1**	5	**2**	3	**1**	6	276
2	(Germany) Sascha Lenz	1	C	2	6	2	7	3	1	2	6	9	5	4	3	2	4	2	6	5	6	1	4	5	1	227
3	(Czech Republic) Adam Lacko	3	C	3	3	3	8	2	4	4	1	2	2	5	2	5	3	5	5	3	4	5	5	6	7	203
4	(Germany) Jochen Hahn	2	C	6	5	Ret	10	**4**	Ret	12	11	**1**	6	**1**	4	3	6	3	Ret	4	9	3	1	2	5	174
5	(Spain) Antonio Albacete	4	C	4	9	4	6	8	2	3	7	3	9	2	8	4	8	4	3	2	7	13	7	3	4	170
6	(Germany) Stephanie Halm	5	C	8	2	5	5	9	Ret	8	2	6	7	13	11	7	7	8	2	6	2	4	13	8	3	114
7	(Germany) André Kursim	Ret	C	9	8	7	1	11	10	5	4	5	8	10	9	6	1	6	1	7	3	Ret	DNS	Ret	13	93
8	(France) Téo Calvet	9	C	7	7	8	2	5	6	7	3	7	3					Ret	8	8	1	8	2	Ret	Ret	88
9	(United Kingdom) Shane Brereton	10	C	5	4	9	9	7	3	11	9	8	4	6	7	8	2	10	10	16	13	9	8	9	11	76
10	(Germany) René Reinert	8	C	11	11	10	14	Ret	12	6	5	10	Ret	DNS	12	9	9	7	Ret	15	12	7	Ret	7	2	42
11	(United Kingdom) Jamie Anderson	6	C	DSQ	DNS	11	11	12	9	9	10	14	11	7	5	DSQ	11	13	9	12	8	Ret	6	13	9	34
12	(France) Anthony Janiec					6	4	6	7									9	11	10	11	6	12	DSQ	Ret	33
13	(Germany) Steffan Faas	7	C	10	10	Ret	13	14	11	10	12	12	10	8	6	10	10	12	12	13	10	12	9	10	10	23
14	(Germany) Lukas Hahn					12	12	10	8													10	10	4	8	19
15	(United Kingdom) Luke Garrett					15	17	16	13	14	Ret	11	Ret	9	10	12	12	14	13	14	Ret					3
16	(United Arab Emirates) Aliyyah Koloc	11	C	12	12	14	16	13	14	13	13	13	12					Ret	14	9	14	11	11	11	12	2
17	(Spain) Luis Recuenco									15	14	Ret	13	11	13	11	13									0
18	(Germany) Heinrich Clemens-Hecker	12	C	13	13	13	15	15	15	DNS	DNS	Ret	14	12	14	13	14	Ret	15	17	15					0
19	(United Kingdom) Thomas O'Rourke	13	C	14	DNS																					0
Drivers ineligible to score points
–	(Portugal) José Rodrigues																	11	7	11	Ret					0
–	(United Kingdom) Ryan Smith																					DNS	DNS	12	Ret	0
Pos.	Driver	HUN^{1} (Hungary)				MOS (Czech Republic)				ZOL (Belgium)				LMS (France)				JAR (Spain)				MIS (Italy)				Pts.

Colour	Result
Gold	Winner
Silver	Second place
Bronze	Third place
Green	Points classification
Blue	Non-points classification
Blue	Non-classified finish (NC)
Purple	Retired, not classified (Ret)
Red	Did not qualify (DNQ)
Red	Did not pre-qualify (DNPQ)
Black	Disqualified (DSQ)
White	Did not start (DNS)
White	Withdrew (WD)
White	Race cancelled (C)
Blank	Did not practice (DNP)
Blank	Did not arrive (DNA)
Blank	Excluded (EX)

**Bold** – Pole
Italics – Fastest Lap

^{1} Race 2 cancelled due to barrier damage caused by an accident on lap 1.

== Bibliography ==
- Göttl, Thomas Paul (2021). "Truck Race Book 2021". Fernfahrer (Special Edition) (in English and German). Stuttgart: ETM Verlag. ISSN 0257-3180.
