= Hungaroring GP2 round =

(Hungary) Hungaroring GP2 round

GP2 Series
- Venue: Hungaroring
- Location: Mogyoród, Hungary
- First race: 2005
- Last race: 2016
- Most wins (driver): (Brazil) Nelson Piquet Jr. (2)
- Most wins (team): (France) ART Grand Prix (6)
- Lap record: 1:28.968 ( (Switzerland) Sébastien Buemi, ART Grand Prix, GP2/05, 2007)

The Hungaroring GP2 round was a GP2 Series race that run from 2005 to 2016 on the Hungaroring track in Mogyoród, Hungary.

== Winners ==
Year	Race	Driver	Team	Report
2005	Feature	(Switzerland) Neel Jani	Racing Engineering	Report
2005	Sprint	(France) Alexandre Prémat	ART Grand Prix	Report
2006	Feature	(Brazil) Nelson Piquet Jr.	Piquet Sports	Report
2006	Sprint	(Brazil) Nelson Piquet Jr.	Piquet Sports	Report
2007	Feature	(United Kingdom) Adam Carroll	Petrol Ofisi FMS International	Report
2007	Sprint	(Spain) Javier Villa	Racing Engineering	Report
2008	Feature	(Brazil) Lucas di Grassi	Barwa International Campos Team	Report
2008	Sprint	(Switzerland) Sébastien Buemi	Trust Team Arden	Report
2009	Feature	(Germany) Nico Hülkenberg	ART Grand Prix	Report
2009	Sprint	(Netherlands) Giedo van der Garde	iSport International	Report
2010	Feature	(Venezuela) Pastor Maldonado	Rapax	Report
2010	Sprint	(Italy) Giacomo Ricci	DPR	Report
2011	Feature	(France) Romain Grosjean	DAMS	Report
2011	Sprint	(Monaco) Stefano Coletti	Trident Racing	Report
2012	Feature	(United Kingdom) Max Chilton	Carlin	Report
2012	Sprint	(Mexico) Esteban Gutiérrez	Lotus GP	Report
2013	Feature	(United Kingdom) Jolyon Palmer	DAMS	Report
2013	Sprint	(France) Nathanaël Berthon	Trident Racing	Report
2014	Feature	(France) Arthur Pic	Campos Racing	Report
2014	Sprint	(Belgium) Stoffel Vandoorne	ART Grand Prix	Report
2015	Feature	(United Kingdom) Alex Lynn	DAMS	Report
2015	Sprint	(Japan) Nobuharu Matsushita	ART Grand Prix	Report
2016	Feature	(France) Pierre Gasly	Prema Racing	Report
2016	Sprint	(Russia) Sergey Sirotkin	ART Grand Prix	Report

== See also ==
- Hungarian Grand Prix
- Budapest Formula 2 round
