= Aliyyah Koloc =

Czech and Seychelloise racing driver

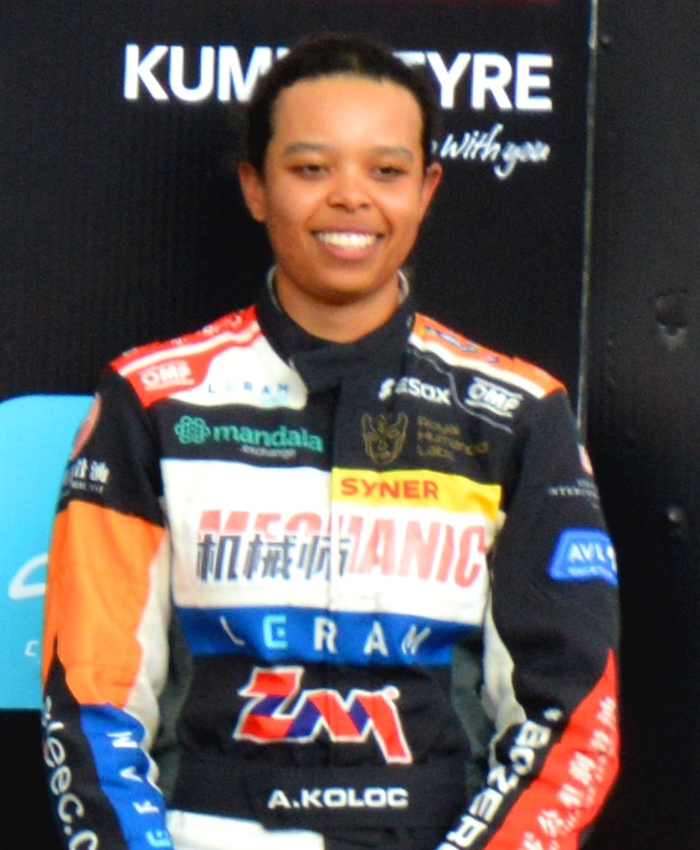
- Koloc at the Brno Circuit in 2025
- Nationality: Czech; Seychelloise
- Born: 1 July 2004 (age 22) Dubai, United Arab Emirates
- Relatives: Martin Koloc (father); Yasmeen Koloc (sister)
- Categorisation: FIA Silver

Previous series
- 2020–2021 2021 2022 2022 2022: European Truck Racing Championship; French Truck Racing Championship; EuroNASCAR; French GT4 Cup; FIA Middle East Cup for Cross-Country Bajas – T3

Championship titles
- 2022: FIA Middle East Cup for Cross-Country Bajas – T3

Aliyyah Koloc (born 1 July 2004) is a racing driver.

== Biography ==
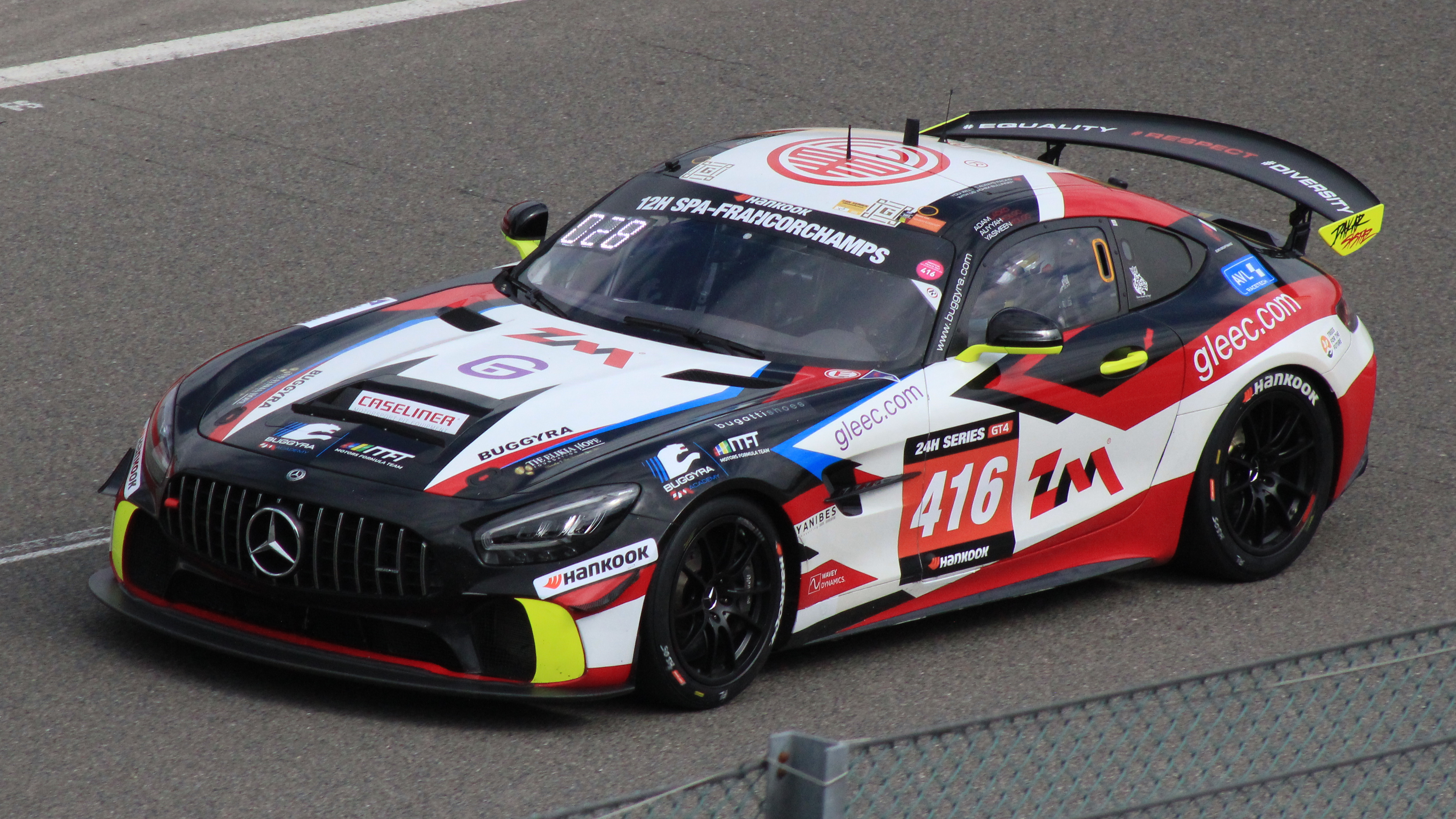
Koloc sharing a Mercedes-AMG GT4 with sister Yasmeen and Adam Lacko at the 2022 12 Hours of Spa.

Koloc's father Martin is Czech and a former truck racer as well as the owner of the Buggyra Racing Team. Her mother is Seychelloise-Sudanese. Her twin sister Yasmeen used to race with her; they were known as the Dakar Sistaz, but an injury stopped Yasmeen's racing career. Koloc has Asperger syndrome.

Born in Dubai, Koloc began her athletic career in tennis at the age of four, but an injury prevented her from competing in that sport. After taking part in a test in one of her father's racing trucks in early 2019, she switched to motorsport with the goal of competing in the Dakar Rally. Starting out in trucks, her program quickly grew to accommodate EuroNASCAR, GT4 and rally raid in order to improve her versatility, leading to a title in the FIA Middle East Cup for Cross-Country Bajas in 2022 ahead of her Dakar debut.

Koloc completed her first Dakar in 2023 in the T3 category. Since 2024, she has competed in the top class of the Dakar, the Ultimate.

Having combined circuit racing and rally raids for several seasons, in early 2026, Koloc's team announced that Koloc would concentrate on rally raids only. Due to regulationary issues around the next-gen cars for the Dakar, the team has opted to concentrate on the FIA European Bajas in what is intended to be a transitional year.

== Racing record ==
=== Career summary ===
| Season | Series | Team | Races | Wins | Poles | F/Laps | Podiums | Points | Position |
|---|---|---|---|---|---|---|---|---|---|
| 2020 | European Truck Racing Championship | Buggyra Zero Mileage Racing | 7 | 0 | 0 | 0 | 0 | 5 | 14th |
| 2021 | French Truck Racing Championship | Team Buggyra Racing | 12 | 0 | 0 | 0 | 4 | 143.5 | 5th |
| 2021 | European Truck Racing Championship | Buggyra Racing | 19 | 0 | 0 | 0 | 0 | 2 | 16th |
| 2021 | ESET V4 Cup - GT | Buggyra Zero Mileage Racing | ? | ? | ? | ? | ? | ? | ? |
| 2021 | ESET V4 Cup - GT | Buggyra Racing | ? | ? | ? | ? | ? | ? | ? |
| 2021 | ESET V4 Cup - Endurance | Buggyra Zero Mileage Racing | ? | ? | ? | ? | ? | ? | ? |
| 2021 | ESET V4 Cup - Endurance | Buggyra Racing | ? | ? | ? | ? | ? | ? | ? |
| 2021 | NASCAR Whelen Euro Series - EuroNASCAR Club Challenge | CAAL Racing | ? | ? | ? | ? | ? | ? | ? |
| 2022 | NASCAR Whelen Euro Series - EuroNASCAR Pro | Buggyra ZM Racing | 4 | 0 | 0 | 0 | 0 | 106 | 27th |
| 2022 | NASCAR Whelen Euro Series - EuroNASCAR 2 | Buggyra ZM Racing | 4 | 0 | 0 | 0 | 0 | 169 | 24th |
| 2022 | French GT4 Cup - Silver | Buggyra ZM-MFT Racing | 6 | 0 | 0 | 0 | 0 | 7 | 12th |
| 2022 | 24H GT Series - GT4 | Buggyra Racing | 1 | 0 | 0 | 0 | 0 | 0 | NC |
| 2022 | FIA Middle East Cup for Cross-Country Bajas - T3 | Buggyra Racing | 4 | 1 | N/A | N/A | 2 | 98 | 1st |
| 2022-23 | Middle East Trophy - GT4 | Buggyra ZM Racing | 1 | 1 | 0 | 0 | 1 | 40 | NC |
| 2023 | FIA World Rally-Raid Championship - T3 | Buggyra ZM Academy | 1 | 0 | N/A | N/A | 0 | 12* | 12th* |
| 2023 | 24H GT Series - GT4 | Buggyra ZM Racing | 5 | 1 | 2 | 1 | 5 | 178 | 3rd |
| 2024 | 24H Series - GT4 | Buggyra ZM Racing | 2 | 2 | 0 | 1 | 2 | 80 | 1st |

=== Dakar Rally ===
| Year | Class | Vehicle | Position | Stages won |
|---|---|---|---|---|
| 2023 | T3 Light Prototypes | (Canada) Can-Am | 33rd | 0 |
| 2024 | T1+ | (South Africa) Revo+ | 25th | 0 |
| 2025 | T1+ | (South Africa) Revo+ | 25th | 0 |
| 2026 | T1+ | (South Africa) Revo+ | DNF | 0 |

=== Complete World Rally-Raid Championship results ===
(key)

| Year | Team | Car | Class | 1 | 2 | 3 | 4 | 5 | Pos. | Points |
|---|---|---|---|---|---|---|---|---|---|---|
| 2023 | Buggyra ZM Academy | DV21 | T3 | DAK; 11^{12} | ABU; 3^{22} | SON | DES | MOR | 12th | 34 |
| 2024 | Buggyra ZM Racing | Red-Lined Revo+ | T1+ | DAK; 47 | ABU; 13^{6} | PRT; Ret | DES | MOR; Ret | 33rd | 6 |
| 2026 | Buggyra ZM Racing | Revo T1+ | T1+ | DAK DNF | CUE | DES | MOR | ABU | * | * |

* Season still in progress
