= Budapest Formula 2 round =

(Hungary) Budapest Formula 2 round

FIA Formula 2 Championship
- Venue: Hungaroring
- Location: Mogyoród, Hungary
- First race: 2017
- Most wins (driver): (Australia) Jack Doohan (2)
- Most wins (team): (Italy) Prema Racing (4)
- Lap record: 1:29.257 ( (Russia) Artem Markelov, Russian Time, GP2/11, 2017)

The Budapest Formula 2 round is a FIA Formula 2 Championship series race that is run on the Hungaroring track in Mogyoród, Hungary.

== Winners ==
Year	Race	Driver	Team	Report
2017	Feature	(United Kingdom) Oliver Rowland	DAMS	Report
2017	Sprint	(Japan) Nobuharu Matsushita	ART Grand Prix	Report
2018	Feature	(Netherlands) Nyck de Vries	Pertamina Prema Theodore Racing	Report
2018	Sprint	(Thailand) Alexander Albon	DAMS	Report
2019	Feature	(Canada) Nicholas Latifi	DAMS	Report
2019	Sprint	(Germany) Mick Schumacher	Prema Racing	Report
2020	Feature	(Russia) Robert Shwartzman	Prema Racing	Report
2020	Sprint	(Italy) Luca Ghiotto	Hitech Grand Prix	Report
2022	Sprint	(Australia) Jack Doohan	Virtuosi Racing	Report
2022	Feature	(France) Théo Pourchaire	ART Grand Prix	Report
2023	Sprint	(Norway) Dennis Hauger	MP Motorsport	Report
2023	Feature	(Australia) Jack Doohan	Invicta Virtuosi Racing	Report
2024	Sprint	(India) Kush Maini	Invicta Racing	Report
2024	Feature	(Italy) Kimi Antonelli	Prema Racing	Report
2025	Sprint	(Spain) Pepe Martí	Campos Racing	Report
2025	Feature	(Italy) Leonardo Fornaroli	Invicta Racing	Report
2026	Sprint	(Italy) Gabriele Minì	MP Motorsport	Report
2026	Feature	(Mexico) Noel León	Campos Racing	Report

== See also ==
- Hungarian Grand Prix
- Hungaroring GP2 round
