= Hungaroring =

Race track in Mogyoród, Hungary

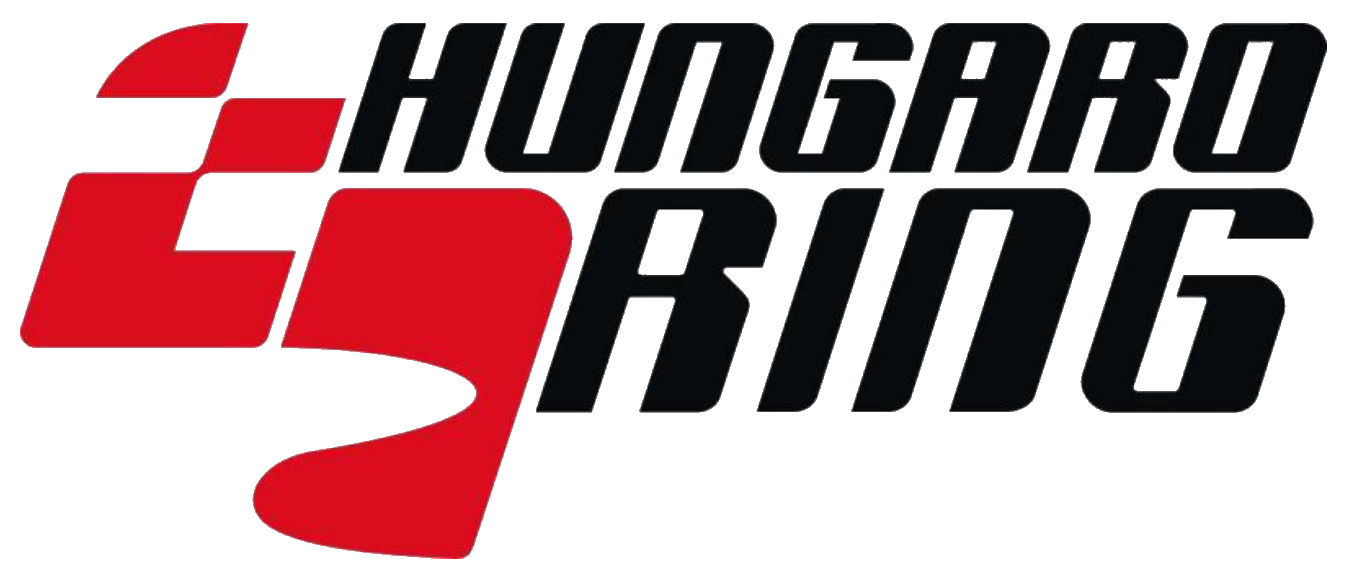

- Grand Prix Circuit (2003–present)
- Location: Mogyoród, Pest County, Hungary
- Coordinates: 47°34′56″N 19°15′04″E
- Capacity: 70,000
- FIA Grade: 1
- Operator: Hungaroring Sport Zrt
- Broke ground: 1 October 1985; 41 years ago
- Opened: 24 March 1986; 40 years ago
- Architect: István Papp & Ferenc Gulácsi
- Former names: Hungaroring (1986–1994, 2005–present); Hungaroring RT (1995–2004)
- Major events: Current: Formula One; Hungarian Grand Prix (1986–present); International GT Open (2012, 2014, 2017–2018, 2020–present); TCR Europe (2018–2019, 2023, 2026); Ferrari Challenge Europe (2008, 2010, 2012, 2015, 2017, 2022, 2026); Future: GT World Challenge Europe (2016–2019, 2027); Former: Grand Prix motorcycle racing Hungarian motorcycle Grand Prix (1990, 1992); ELMS 4 Hours of Hungaroring (2010, 2013); TCR World Tour (2023); European Truck Racing Championship (1988–1990, 2015–2022); FIA WTCR Race of Hungary (2011–2022); DTM (2014, 2016–2018); World SBK (1988–1990); FIA GT (1998–2001, 2006, 2009)
- Website: https://hungaroring.hu

Grand Prix Circuit (2003–present)
- Length: 4.381 km (2.722 mi)
- Turns: 14
- Race lap record: 1:16.627 ( (United Kingdom) Lewis Hamilton, Mercedes W11, 2020, F1)

Modified Grand Prix Circuit (1989–2002)
- Length: 3.975 km (2.470 mi)
- Turns: 13
- Race lap record: 1:16.207 ( (Germany) Michael Schumacher, Ferrari F2002, 2002, F1)

Original Grand Prix Circuit (1986–1988)
- Length: 4.014 km (2.494 mi)
- Turns: 16
- Race lap record: 1:30.149 ( (Brazil) Nelson Piquet, Williams FW11B, 1987, F1)

The Hungaroring is a 4.381 km (2.722 mi) motorsport racetrack in Mogyoród, Pest County, Hungary, where the Formula One Hungarian Grand Prix is held. In 1986, it became the location of the first Formula One Grand Prix behind the Iron Curtain. Bernie Ecclestone wanted a race in the USSR, but a Hungarian friend recommended Budapest. They wanted a street circuit similar to the Circuit de Monaco to be built in the Népliget – Budapest's largest park – but the government decided to build a new circuit just outside the city near a major highway. Construction works started on 1 October 1985. It was built in eight months, less time than any other Formula One circuit. The first race was held on 24 March 1986, in memory of János Drapál, the first Hungarian who won motorcycle Grand Prix races.

According to a survey by the national tourism office of Hungary, Mogyoród ranks third among Hungarian destinations visited by tourists, behind the Danube Bend area and Lake Balaton, but ahead of Budapest. The circuit has FIA Grade 1 license.

== Description ==
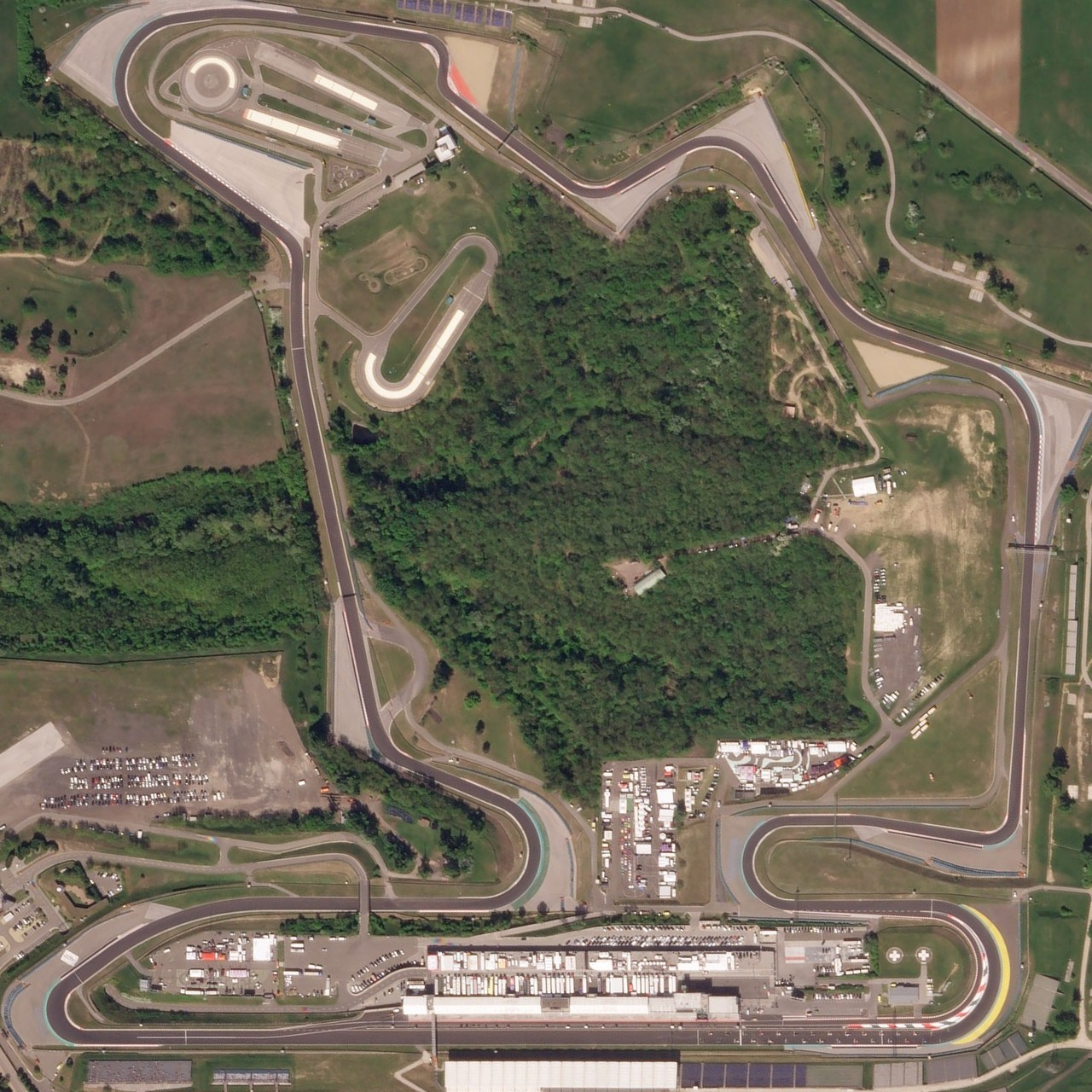
Satellite view of the Hungaroring in April 2018

The Grand Prix is held in the middle of summer, which is usually extremely hot and dry in this region. Its first wet Grand Prix race was in 2006. The circuit is normally dusty due to underuse throughout the rest of the year and its sandy soil. As the circuit is in a valley, about 80 percent of it can be seen from any point.

Normally, an underused circuit becomes faster over the weekend as the track surface gathers more rubber residue; however, with the Hungaroring this generally does not happen, because the track can get dusty so quickly. The track frequently becomes faster during a qualifying session, which leads competitors to try for their best lap as late as possible.

The twisty and bumpy nature of the circuit makes overtaking very difficult in dry conditions. The circuit is nicknamed "Monaco without the barriers" for this reason. Nonetheless, the Hungaroring has been the scene of several races such as the duels of Nelson Piquet and Ayrton Senna, Nigel Mansell's win from 12th on the grid after a pass on Ayrton Senna in 1989, Damon Hill's almost victory with Arrows in 1997, and Michael Schumacher's change in strategy to beat the McLarens of Häkkinen and Coulthard in 1998. More recently, it has seen events such as Jenson Button triumphing over Fernando Alonso in the wet in 2006, Daniel Ricciardo scything through the field from sixth on the grid in 2014, Lewis Hamilton's late overtake on Max Verstappen to take the win in 2019, and Alonso denying Hamilton a chance of victory in 2021. Maiden wins at the track include Hill in 1993, Alonso in 2003, Button in 2006, Heikki Kovalainen in 2008, Esteban Ocon in 2021, and Oscar Piastri in 2024.

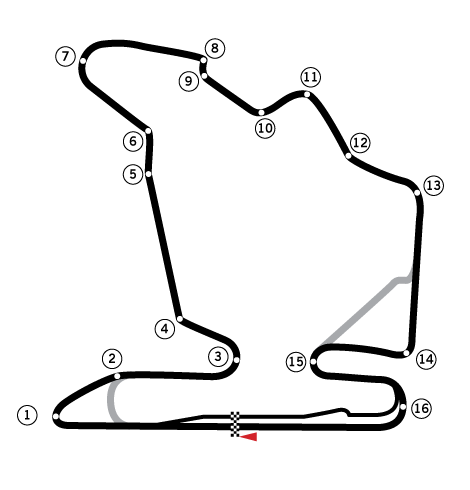
The differences between the 1989–2002 layout and current layout

The first change in the track's layout was carried out in 1989, when the chicane after the actual turn three (a temporary measure put in during construction due to the discovery of a spring where the direct route was due to run) was removed by culverting the stream. In 2003, the main straight (turn one, see diagram) was lengthened by roughly 200 m (660 ft) to 908 m (2,979 ft), and the hairpin at the end of the straight was also tightened in an attempt to facilitate more overtaking opportunities, as well as a tightening of what was turn 12. These changes lengthened the circuit length from 3.975 to 4.381 km (2.470 to 2.722 mi).

== Drivers ==
The Hungaroring has crowned two drivers in its 40-year history: both Nigel Mansell in 1992 and Michael Schumacher in 2001 were able to win the World Championship title. Moreover, the WilliamsF1 Team and Scuderia Ferrari also secured the Constructors' Championship at the Hungaroring, Williams in 1996 and Ferrari in 2001, 2002, and 2004.

Both Hungary's Zsolt Baumgartner and Poland's Robert Kubica made their debut on this track as the first F1 drivers of their countries.

The 2006 Hungarian Grand Prix was the first wet Grand Prix at the Hungaroring. This saw the retirement of many drivers including championship rivals Fernando Alonso and Michael Schumacher and gave Jenson Button and the reborn Honda F1 team their first win. Fernando Alonso also earned his first Grand Prix victory at this in 2003, declaring it his favourite track as a result.

According to statements and interviews, drivers have different opinions on the track. While many, like Ayrton Senna, Nigel Mansell, Michael Schumacher, Lewis Hamilton, Max Verstappen and Fernando Alonso claimed to love it, many others consider the track too slow, hot and demanding. The technical driving center of the Hungaroring held former racer Gerhard Berger's name from 1998 until 2005 but later it was changed to Allianz.

The track also has named curves: Turn 1 is named after Nelson Piquet Sr., turn 2 is named after Lewis Hamilton due to his record eight victories. Turn 4 is named after Nigel Mansell, due to him losing a wheel there during the 1987 Hungarian Grand Prix. Turn 11 is named after Jean Alesi following his massive crash there during qualifying for the 1995 Hungarian Grand Prix. Turn 12 is named after Michael Schumacher and turn 13 is named after Ayrton Senna.

On Saturday, 25 July 2009, in the second round of qualifying for the Hungarian Grand Prix at Hungaroring, Ferrari driver Felipe Massa's head was injured, though protected by his driver's helmet, he was struck by a suspension spring that had fallen from Rubens Barrichello's Brawn GP car while driving at high speed. He was knocked unconscious, and subsequently crashed head-on into a tyre barrier. Massa was thereafter airlifted to the military hospital in Budapest, where he underwent surgery in the area surrounding his left eye. His condition was initially described as "life-threatening but stable", but improved rapidly. Massa was discharged from hospital the following week and returned to Brazil. After further tests it was decided that Massa needed a titanium plate inserted into his skull to strengthen it for racing in Formula One again.

== Fans ==
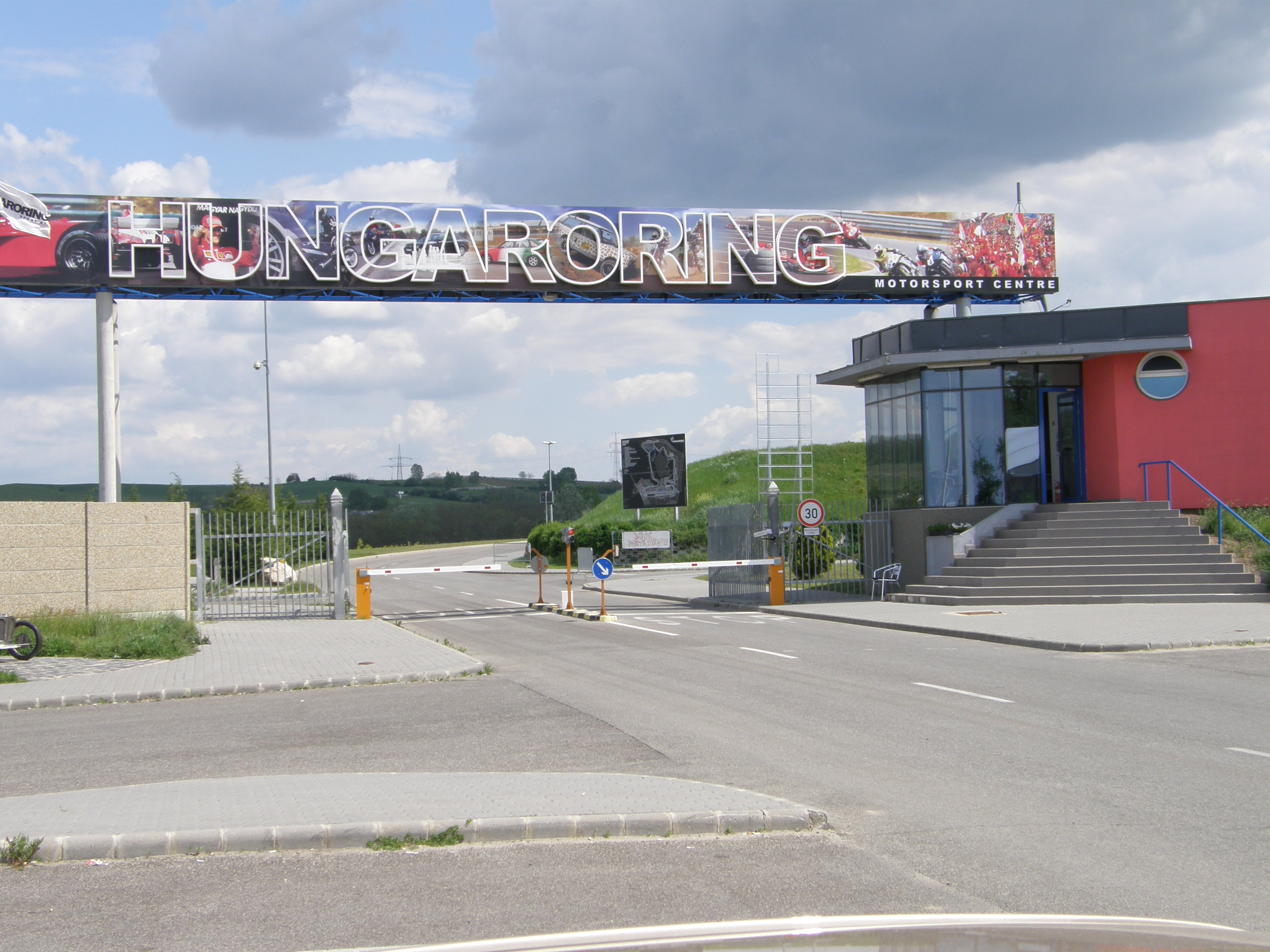
Hungaroring – former main gate, in 2008

While most of the foreign fans are from Germany and Austria, the Hungaroring has traditionally seen a large influx of Finnish fans as well. With the loss of the Austrian Grand Prix in 2003, this became the closest Formula One event for fans from other Central European countries. However, the Austrian Grand Prix returned again in 2014. The 2006–2010 races saw many spectators from Poland due to the participation of Robert Kubica. Michael Schumacher's success in the 1990s brought tens of thousands of German fans to Hungaroring each year. The trend began in 1992 and continued throughout the 2000s until his retirement in 2006. Schumacher won at Hungaroring in 1994, 1998, 2001 and 2004, finishing second in 2000 and 2002.

The contract is prolonged until 2032, although profits from tobacco advertising have been cut from the equation since such advertising was banned in 2007.

The Hungaroring is the home of Hungarian motorsport. Besides Formula One, it has also hosted the International GT Open, DTM, GT World Challenge Europe and FIA GT Championship races. From 2011 to 2022, it also hosted the races of WTCC and WTCR as FIA WTCC Race of Hungary, a public drag race event takes place every month.

== Events ==
Current

- July: Formula One Hungarian Grand Prix, FIA Formula 2 Championship Budapest Formula 2 round, FIA Formula 3 Championship, Porsche Supercup, International GT Open, Formula Regional European Championship, Euroformula Open Championship, GB3 Championship, TCR Europe Touring Car Series
- September: Ferrari Challenge Europe
- October: Eurocup-3, TCR Eastern Europe Touring Car Series, Formula 4 CEZ Championship, GT Cup Series, Porsche Sprint Challenge Central Europe

Future

- F1 Academy (2027)
- GT Cup Open Europe (2019–2022, 2027)
- GT World Challenge Europe (2016–2019, 2027)
- GT2 European Series (2027)
- GT3 Revival Series (2027)
- Lamborghini Super Trofeo Europe (2010, 2027)

Former

- GT Cup Open Europe (2019–2022)
- GT World Challenge Europe (2016–2019)
- 24H Series
  - 12 Hours of Hungary (2008–2011, 2013–2014, 2021)
- Audi Sport TT Cup (2016)
- Austria Formula 3 Cup (1994–1995, 2019–2020, 2022–2023)
- Auto GP (2006–2007, 2011–2015)
- Classic Endurance Racing
  - Hungaroring Classic (2017, 2019)
- Cup of Peace and Friendship (1986–1987)
- Deutsche Tourenwagen Masters (2014, 2016–2018)
- Deutsche Tourenwagen Meisterschaft (1988)
- Eurocup Mégane Trophy (2007–2013)
- European Le Mans Series
  - 4 Hours of Hungaroring (2010, 2013)
- European Super Touring Championship (2000–2001)
- European Touring Car Cup (2015, 2017)
- European Truck Racing Championship (1988–1990, 2015–2022)
- Ferrari Challenge Italy (2005, 2008, 2010)
- FFSA GT Championship (2000)
- FIA ETCR – eTouring Car World Cup (2021–2022)
- FIA Formula 3 European Championship (2014, 2016–2018)
- FIA GT Championship (1998–2001, 2006, 2009)
- Formula Abarth European Championship (2012)
- Formula BMW Europe (2012–2013)
- Formula BMW Talent Cup (2012–2013)
- Formula Renault 2.0 Alps (2011)
- Formula Renault Eurocup (1998, 2001, 2007–2015, 2017–2019)
- Formula Renault Northern European Cup (2016, 2018)
- Formula TT (1987)
- French F4 Championship (2010, 2015, 2019, 2021)
- German Formula Three Championship (1988)
- GP2 Series
  - Hungaroring GP2 round (2005–2016)
- GP3 Series (2010–2018)
- Grand Prix motorcycle racing
  - Hungarian motorcycle Grand Prix (1990, 1992)
- GT4 European Series (2016, 2018)
- IDM Superbike Championship (1994, 2015)
- International Formula 3000 (1998–2004)
- International Formula Master (2009)
- International GTSprint Series (2012)
- Interserie (1988–1990, 1997–1998)
- Italian F4 Championship (2019)
- Italian Formula Renault Championship (2008–2009)
- Italian Formula Three Championship (2012)
- Italian GT Championship (2005)
- Porsche Carrera Cup Benelux (2025)
- Porsche Carrera Cup Germany (1988, 2014, 2024)
- Renault Clio Cup (2021–2023)
- Renault Sport Trophy (2015)
- Sidecar World Championship (1990, 1997, 2005, 2012)
- Superbike World Championship (1988–1990)
- Superstars Series (2012)
- TCR International Series (2017)
- TCR World Tour (2023)
- World Series Formula V8 3.5 (2007–2016)
- World Touring Car Championship
  - FIA WTCC Race of Hungary (2011–2017)
- World Touring Car Cup
  - FIA WTCR Race of Hungary (2018–2022)
- W Series (2021–2022)

== Lap records ==
As of October 2026, the fastest official race lap records at the Hungaroring are listed as:

Category	Time	Driver	Vehicle	Event	Circuit Map
Grand Prix Circuit (2003–present): 4.381 km (2.722 mi)
Formula One	1:16.627	Lewis Hamilton	Mercedes-AMG F1 W11 EQ Performance	2020 Hungarian Grand Prix	
GP2	1:28.968	Sébastien Buemi	Dallara GP2/05	2007 Hungaroring GP2 round	
FIA F2	1:29.257	Artem Markelov	Dallara GP2/11	2017 Hungaroring F2 round	
Formula Renault 3.5	1:29.706	Tom Dillmann	Dallara T12	2016 Hungaroring Formula V8 round	
GP3	1:33.715	George Russell	Dallara GP3/16	2017 Hungaroring GP3 round	
Auto GP	1:33.924	Adrian Quaife-Hobbs	Lola B05/52	2012 Hungaroring Auto GP round	
Formula Three	1:34.023	Maximilian Günther	Dallara F315	2016 Hungaroring F3 European Championship round	
FIA F3	1:34.195	Jake Hughes	Dallara F3 2019	2020 Hungaroring FIA F3 round	
Euroformula Open	1:34.746	Cameron Das	Dallara 320	2021 Hungaroring Euroformula Open round	
LMP1	1:34.934	Olivier Panis	Peugeot 908 HDi FAP	2010 1000 km of Hungaroring	
Eurocup-3	1:35.520	James Egozi	Dallara 326	2026 Hungaroring Eurocup-3 round	
LMP2	1:36.369	Danny Watts	HPD ARX-01c	2010 1000 km of Hungaroring	
DTM	1:36.725	Mattias Ekström	Audi RS5 DTM	2017 Hungaroring DTM round	
F3000	1:36.809	Patrick Friesacher	Lola B02/50	2003 Hungaroring F3000 round	
GB3	1:37.028	Nikita Bedrin	Tatuus MSV GB3-025	2026 Hungaroring GB3 round	
FTwo (2009–2012)	1:37.068	Alex Fontana	Williams JPH1B	2012 Hungaroring FTwo round	
International Formula Master	1:38.696	Sergey Afanasyev	Tatuus N.T07	2009 Hungaroring Formula Master round	
Formula Regional	1:39.111	Rashid Al Dhaheri	Tatuus F3 T-318	2025 Hungaroring FREC round	
Formula Renault 2.0	1:41.496	Gabriel Aubry	Tatuus FR2.0/13	2017 Hungaroring Formula Renault Eurocup round	
LMPC	1:41.869	Nicky Catsburg	Oreca FLM09	2013 3 Hours of Hungaroring	
GT3	1:42.887	Christopher Mies	Audi R8 LMS GT3	2016 Hungaroring Blancpain GT Series Sprint Cup round	
Renault Sport Trophy	1:42.890	Steijn Schothorst	Renault Sport R.S. 01	2015 Hungaroring Renault Sport Trophy round	
GT1 (GTS)	1:43.076	Fabio Babini	Aston Martin DBR9	2006 FIA GT Budapest 500km	
Formula Abarth	1:43.114	Nicolas Costa	Tatuus FA010	2012 Hungaroring Formula Abarth round	
Formula 4	1:43.297	Dennis Hauger	Tatuus F4-T014	2019 Hungaroring Italian F4 round	
Ferrari Challenge	1:45.569	Sergio Paulet	Ferrari 296 Challenge	2026 Hungaroring Ferrari Challenge round	
LMP3	1:45.668	Miro Konôpka	Ligier JS P320	2026 Hungaroring GT Cup Endurance round	
LM GTE	1:46.497	Nick Tandy	Porsche 911 (997) GT3-RSR	2013 3 Hours of Hungaroring	
Porsche Carrera Cup	1:46.748	Marcus Amand	Porsche 911 (992 II) Cup	2026 Hungaroring Porsche Supercup round	
Superbike	1:48.218	Markus Reiterberger	BMW S1000RR	2015 Hungaroring IDM Superbike round	
FIA GT Group 2	1:48.847	Andrej Studenic	Saleen S7-R	2009 Budapest City Challenge	
Lamborghini Super Trofeo	1:49.544	Edoardo Liberati	Lamborghini Huracán LP 620-2 Super Trofeo Evo	2019 Hungaroring GT Cup Open Europe round	
Eurocup Mégane Trophy	1:49.628	Albert Costa	Renault Mégane Renault Sport II	2012 Hungaroring Eurocup Mégane Trophy round	
TC1	1:50.119	Yvan Muller	Citroën C-Elysée WTCC	2014 FIA WTCC Race of Hungary	
GT4	1:50.247	Guilherme Salas	Mercedes-AMG GT4	2019 Hungaroring GT Cup Open Europe round	
Formula BMW	1:50.432	Esteban Gutiérrez	Mygale FB02	2008 Hungaroring Formula BMW Europe round	
Formula Renault 1.6	1:51.092	Valentin Moineault	Signatech FR 1.6	2015 Hungaroring French F4 round	
FIA GT Group 3	1:52.561	Toni Seiler	Aston Martin DBRS9	2006 FIA GT Budapest 500km	
Supersport	1:52.572	Jan Bühn	Yamaha YZF-R6	2015 Hungaroring IDM Supersport round	
TCR Touring Car	1:53.163	Mikel Azcona	Hyundai i30 N TCR	2022 FIA WTCR Race of Hungary	
Audi Sport TT Cup	1:54.919	Dennis Marschall	Audi TT Cup	2016 Hungaroring Audi Sport TT Cup round	
Superstars Series	1:54.976	Johan Kristoffersson	Audi RS5	2012 Hungaroring Superstars Series round	
Super 2000	1:55.141	Franz Engstler	BMW 320 TC	2014 FIA WTCC Race of Hungary	
SEAT León Supercopa	1:55.975	Dušan Borković	SEAT León Cup Racer	2015 Hungaroring ETC round	
ETCR	1:56.830	Philipp Eng	Alfa Romeo Giulia ETCR	2021 Hungaroring Pure ETCR round	
Renault Clio Cup	2:03.749	Filip Sandstrom	Renault Clio R.S. V	2021 Hungaroring FIA CEZ Endurance Championship Series round	
Super 1600	2:08.979	Niklas Mackschin	Ford Fiesta 1.6 16V	2015 Hungaroring ETC round	
Truck racing	2:18.214	Norbert Kiss	MAN TGS	2021 Hungaroring ETRC round	
Grand Prix Circuit (1989–2002): 3.975 km (2.470 mi)
Formula One	1:16.207	Michael Schumacher	Ferrari F2002	2002 Hungarian Grand Prix	
F3000	1:29.846	Ricardo Sperafico	Lola B02/50	2002 Hungaroring F3000 round	
Group C	1:31.990	Bernd Schneider	Porsche 962 CK6	1990 Hungaroring Interserie round	
GT1 (Prototype)	1:32.300	Klaus Ludwig	Mercedes-Benz CLK LM	1998 FIA GT Budapest 500km	
GT1 (GTS)	1:39.068	Julian Bailey	Lister Storm	2001 FIA GT Budapest 500km	
GT2	1:39.634	Stéphane Ortelli	Porsche 911 GT2	1999 FIA GT Budapest 500km	
Formula Renault 2.0	1:39.663	César Campaniço	Tatuus FR2000	2001 Hungaroring Formula Renault 2000 Eurocup round	
Super Touring	1:43.167	Roberto Colciago	Audi A4 Quattro	2001 Hungaroring ESTC round	
N-GT	1:43.295	Fabio Babini	Porsche 911 (996) GT3-RS	2001 FIA GT Budapest 500km	
500cc	1:44.390	Mick Doohan	Honda NSR500	1990 Hungarian motorcycle Grand Prix	
250cc	1:44.995	Pierfrancesco Chili	Aprilia RSV 250	1992 Hungarian motorcycle Grand Prix	
Porsche Carrera Cup	1:45.815	Marco Werner	Porsche 911 (996) GT3 Cup	2002 Hungaroring Porsche Supercup round	
World SBK	1:47.875	Fred Merkel	Honda RC30	1990 Hungaroring World SBK round	
125cc	1:50.150	Fausto Gresini	Honda RS125R	1992 Hungarian motorcycle Grand Prix	
Original Grand Prix Circuit (1986–1988): 4.014 km (2.494 mi)
Formula One	1:30.149	Nelson Piquet	Williams FW11B	1987 Hungarian Grand Prix	
Group C	1:42.390	Kris Nissen	Porsche 962C	1988 Hungaroring Interserie round	
Formula Three	1:43.730	Otto Rensing	Reynard 883	1988 Hungaroring German F3 round	
World SBK	1:57.280	Marco Lucchinelli	Ducati 851 SBK	1988 Hungaroring World SBK round	
Group A	1:57.380	Frank Schmickler	BMW M3 (E30) Evo	1988 Hungaroring DTM round	

== Fatal accidents ==
- 9 August 2015: (Slovenia) Berto Camlek – Alpe Adria Road Racing Championship

== See also ==
- List of Formula One circuits
