= Miro Konôpka =

Slovak racing driver (born 1962)

Miroslav Konôpka
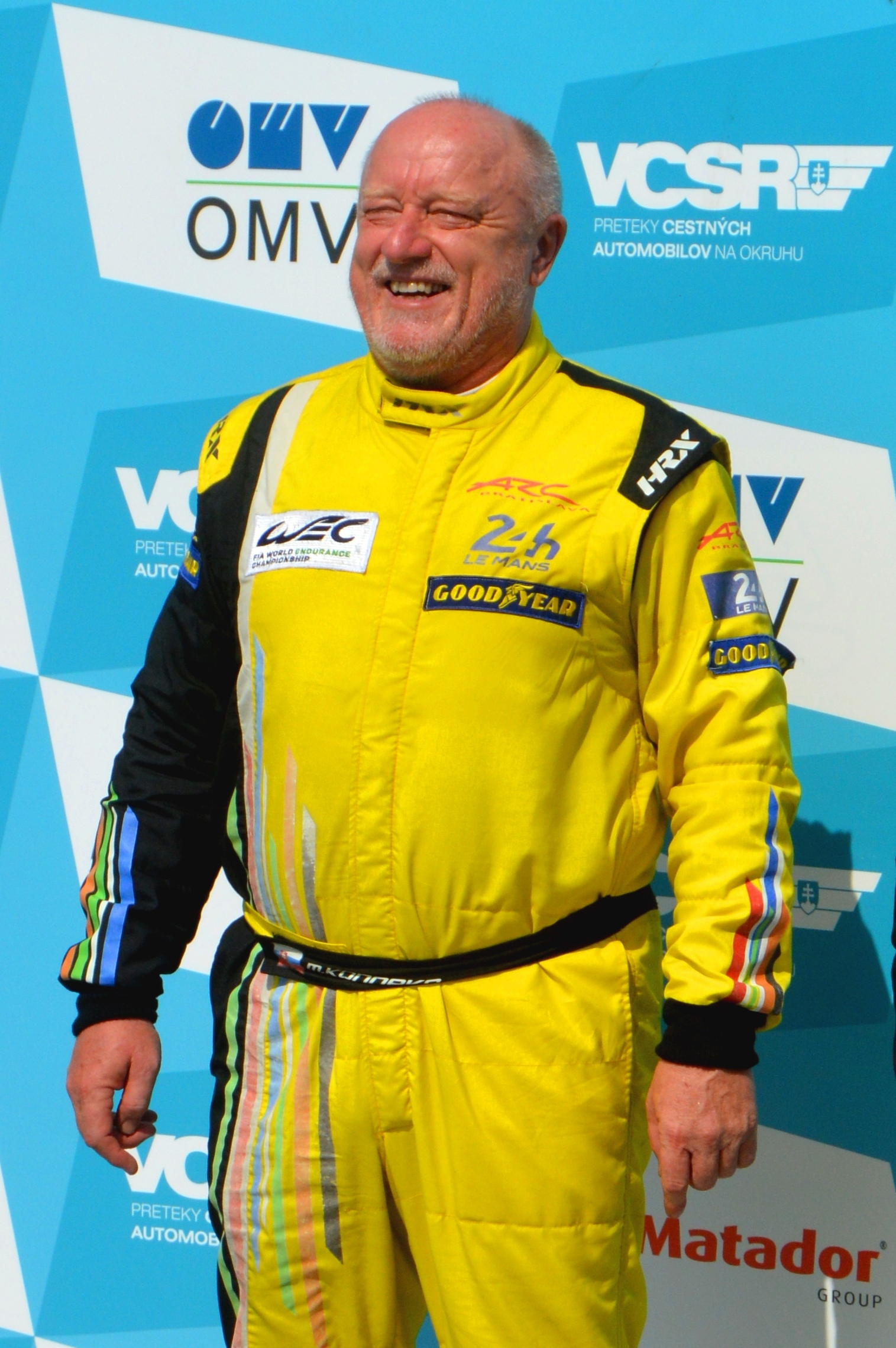
- Konôpka in 2023
- Nationality: (Slovakia) Slovak
- Born: Miroslav Konôpka; 21 January 1962 (age 64) Bratislava, Slovakia

FIA World Endurance Championship career
- Debut season: 2017
- Current team: ARC Bratislava
- Categorisation: FIA Bronze
- Car number: 44
- Starts: 13 (13 entries)
- Wins: 0
- Podiums: 0
- Poles: 0
- Fastest laps: 0
- Best finish: 23rd (LMP2) in 2022

Miroslav Konôpka (born 21 January 1962) is a Slovak racing driver who most recently competed in the FIA World Endurance Championship with his own team, ARC Bratislava.

== Racing record ==
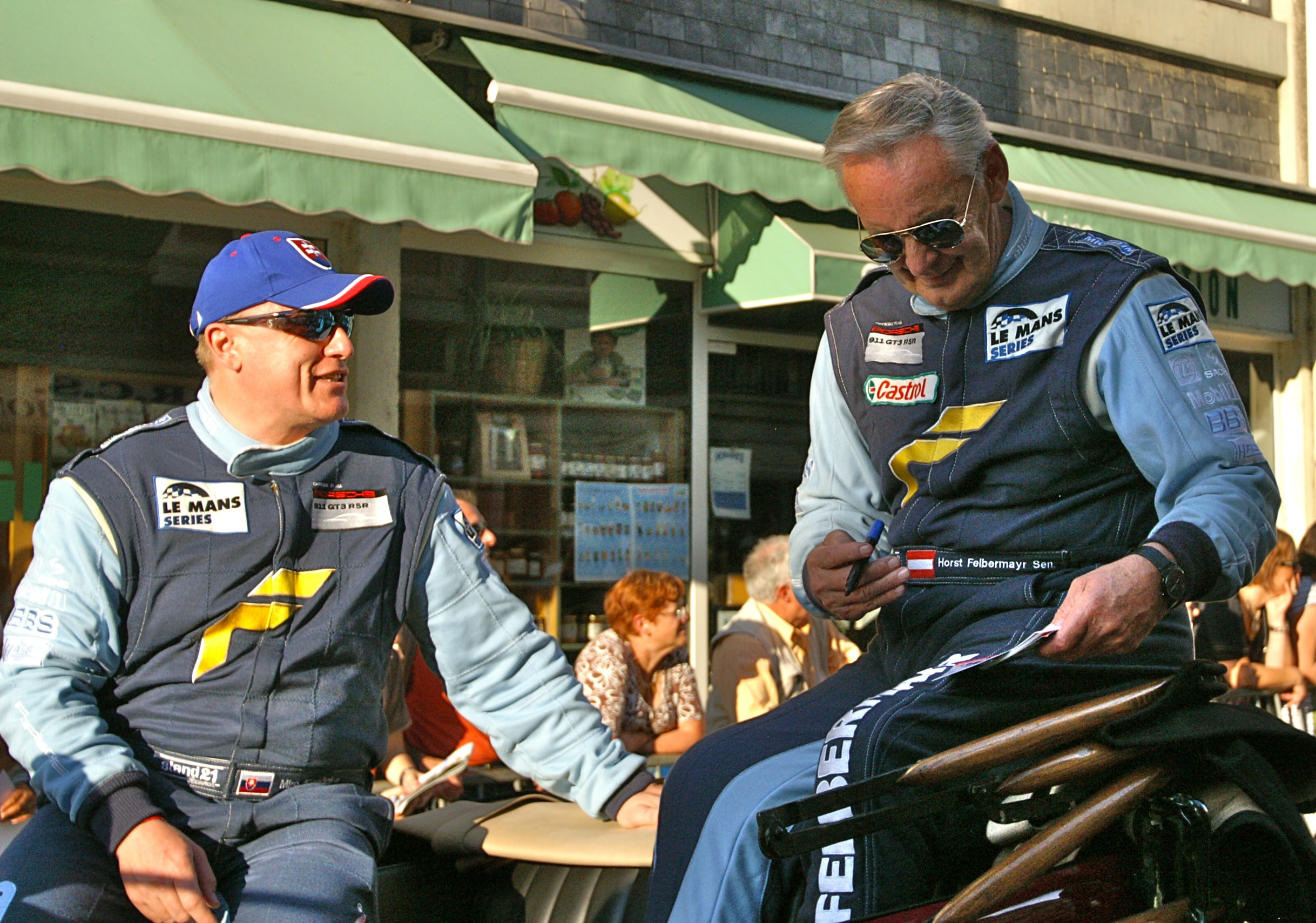
Konôpka with Horst Felbermayr at the 2010 24 Hours of Le Mans drivers' parade. This was Konôpka second Le Mans appearance and the only one in Team Felbermayr-Proton colors.

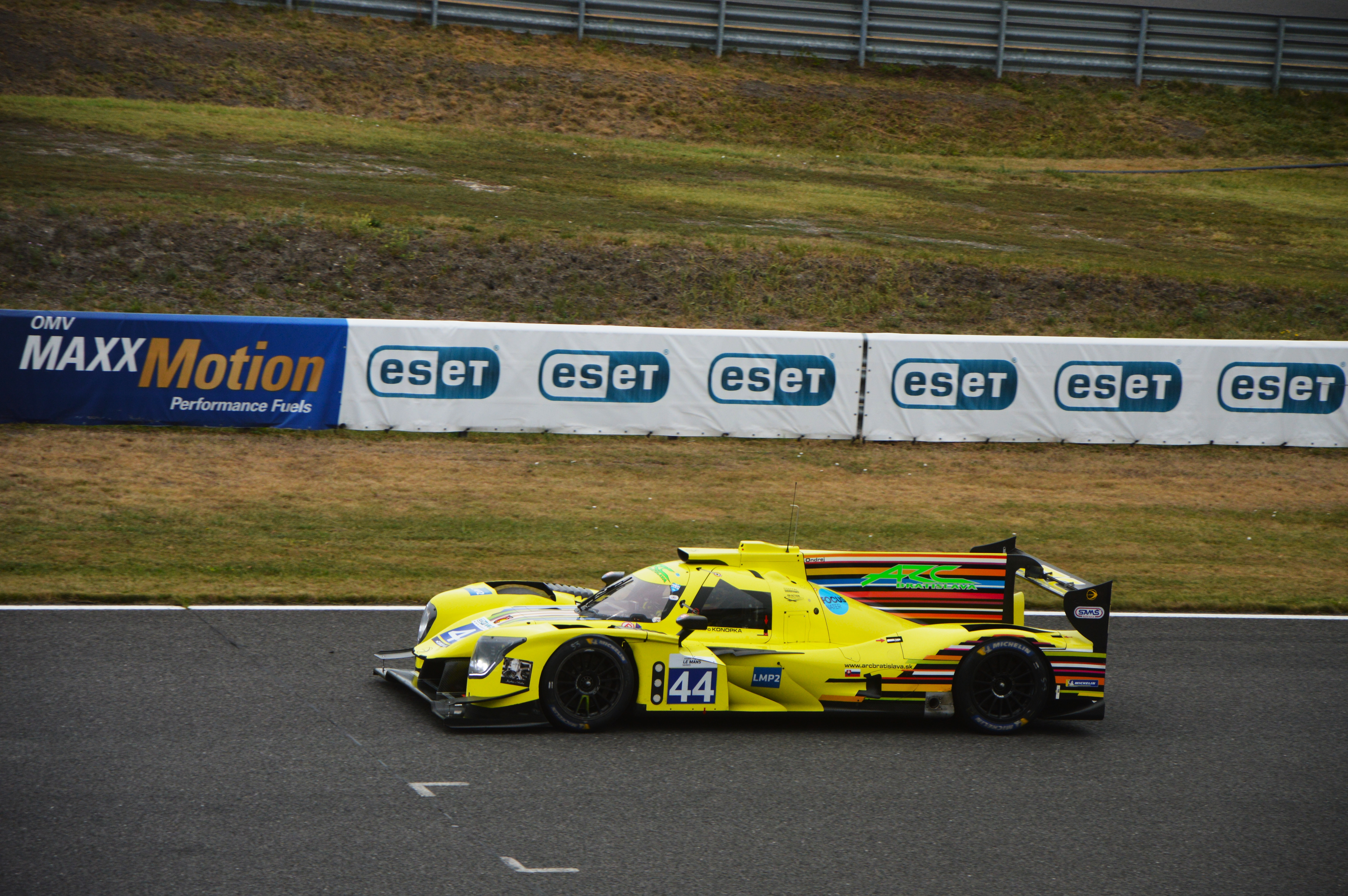
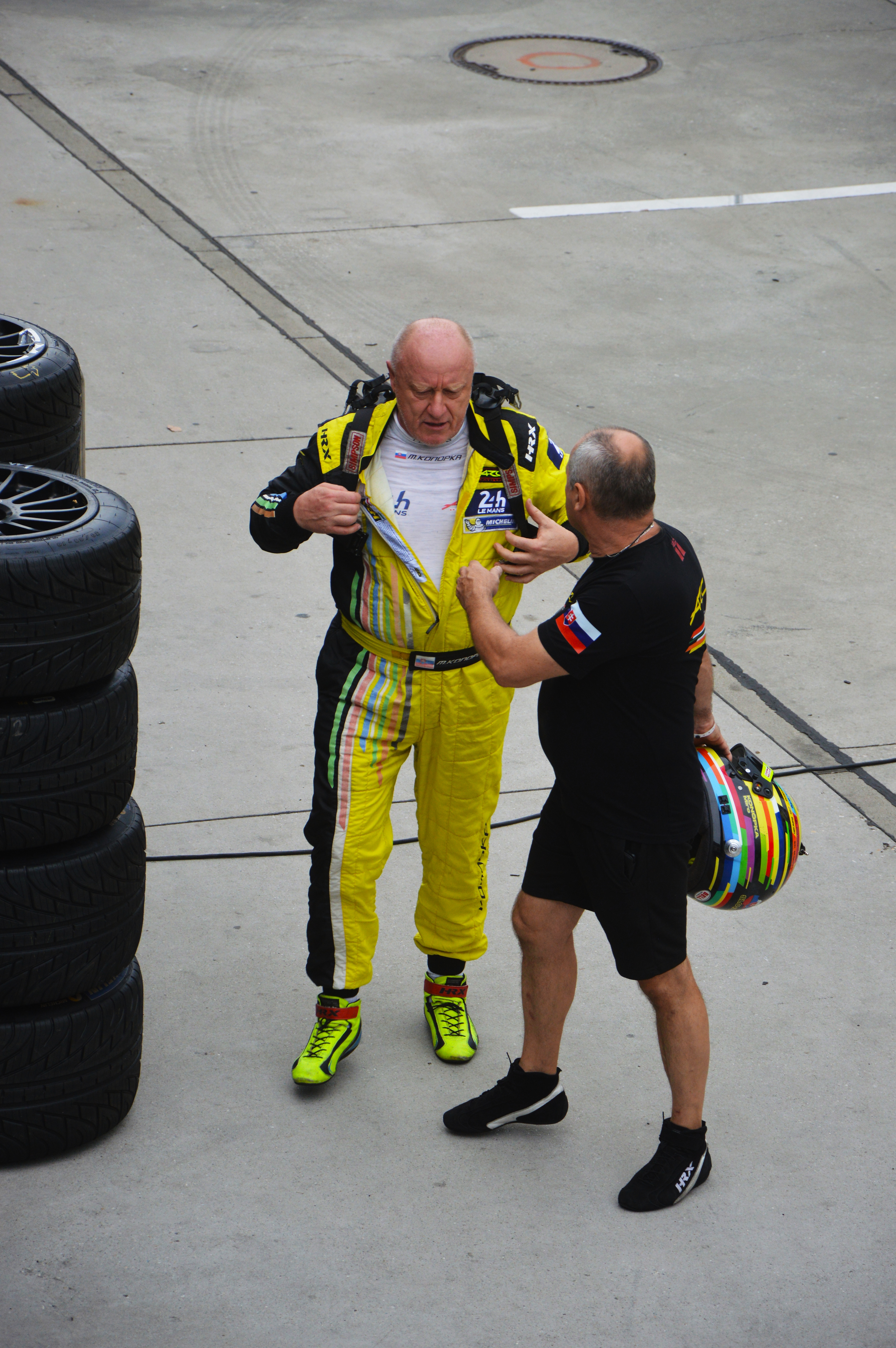
Konôpka taking part in the 2022 Grand Prix of Slovakia at the Automotodróm Slovakia Ring with ARC Bratislava.

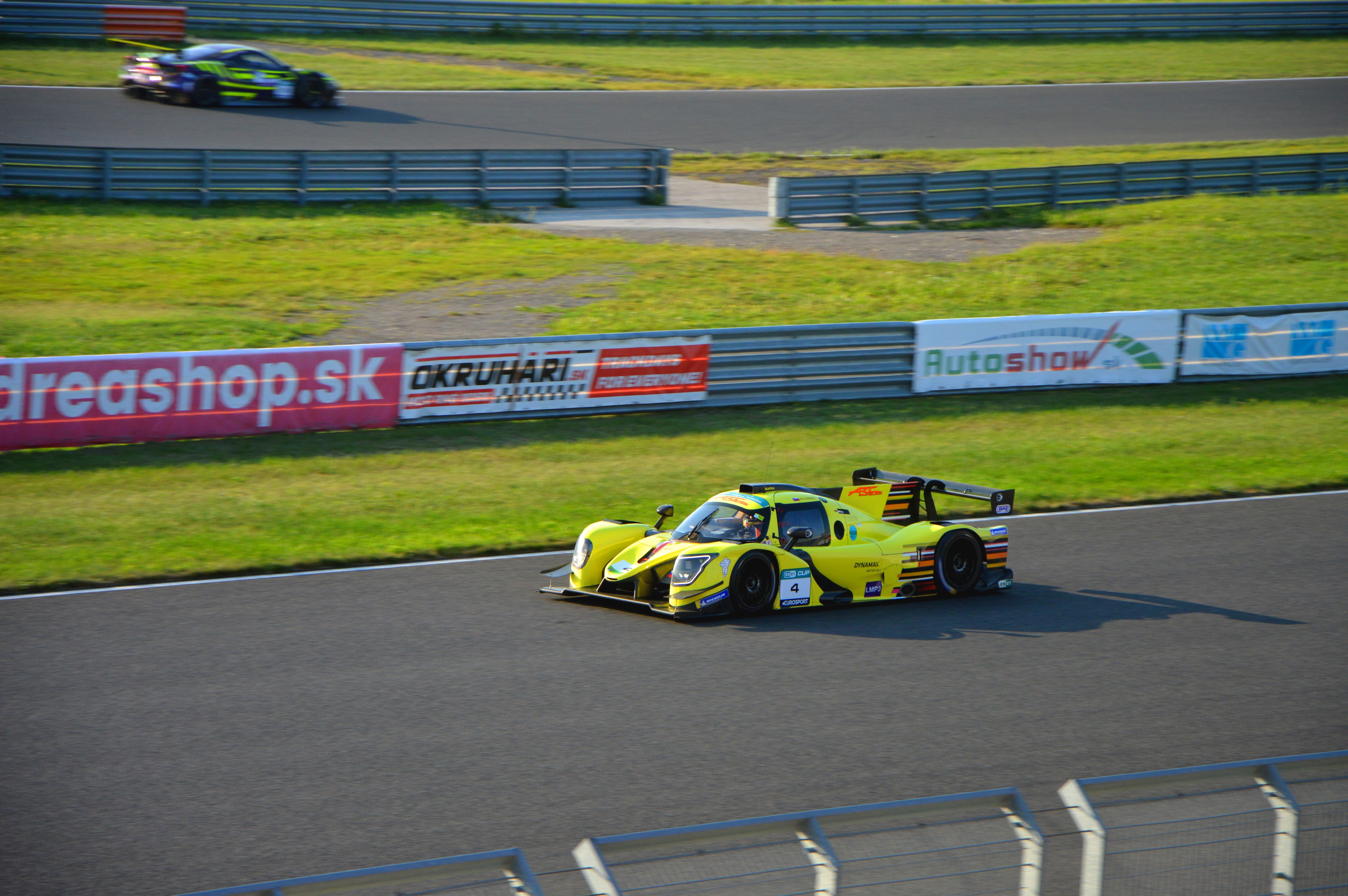
Konôpka competing in an ESET Cup Series / FIA CEZ endurance race at the 2023 Grand Prix of Slovakia, which he eventually won. Unlike the previous year (above), he used a Ligier JS P320 instead of the older JS P217.

=== Racing career summary ===
Season	Series	Team	Races	Wins	Poles	F/Laps	Podiums	Points	Position
2003	Porsche Supercup	Team Slovakia	10	0	0	0	0	29	16th
2004	FIA GT Championship - N-GT	Vonka Racing	4	0	0	0	1	12	22nd
2005	FIA GT Championship - GT2	Autoracing Club Bratislava	5	0	0	0	0	19.5	13th
2005	FIA GT Championship - GT2	Czech National Team	1	0	0	0	0	19.5	13th
2005	Grand American Rolex Series - GT	Sigalsport	1	?	?	?	?	0	NC†
2006	FIA GT Championship - GT2	ARC Bratislava	8	0	0	0	0	3	39th
2006	Le Mans Series - LMGT2	T2M Motorsport	1	0	0	0	0	0	NC†
2006	24 Hours of Le Mans - GT2	T2M Motorsport	1	0	0	0	0	N/A	DNF
2006	Grand American Rolex Series - GT	Sigalsport	1	0	0	0	0	0	181st
2007	American Le Mans Series - GT2	ARC Bratislava	1	0	0	0	0	0	NC
2007	24 Hours of Barcelona	Red Camel Racing	1	0	0	0	0	N/A	24th
2008	FIA GT Championship - GT1	Autoracing Club Bratislava	2	0	0	0	0	0	NC†
2008	FIA GT Championship - GT2	Autoracing Club Bratislava	1	0	0	0	0	0	NC†
2008	American Le Mans Series - GT2	Autoracing Club Bratislava	1	0	0	0	0	0	NC
2008	24H Series - A6	Autoracing Club Bratislava	2	0	0	0	0	0	26th
2008	Malaysia Merdeka Endurance Race	Autoracing Club Bratislava	1	0	0	0	0	N/A	6th
2008	Grand American Rolex Series - DP	Matt Connolly Motorsports	1	0	0	0	0	10	63rd
2008	24 Hours of Nürburgring - SP7	Rüdiger Klos	1	0	0	0	0	N/A	17th
2009	Le Mans Series - GT1	ARC Bratislava – Kaneko Racing	1	0	0	0	0	0	NC
2009	24H Series - A6	ARC Bratislava	1	0	0	0	1	0	NC
2009	24 Hours of Nürburgring - SP9	N/A	1	0	0	0	0	N/A	9th
2010	24H Series - A6	ARC Bratislava	2	0	0	0	0	0	NC
2010	24 Hours of Le Mans - GT2	Team Felbermayr-Proton	1	0	0	0	0	N/A	8th
2010–11	Senegal Endurance Championship	ARC Bratislava	1	1	0	0	1	42	14th
2011	Bathurst 12 Hours - Class B	Motorsport Services	1	0	0	0	1	N/A	**2nd**
2012	Blancpain Endurance Series - GT3 Pro-Am	ARC Bratislava	4	0	0	0	0	0	NC
2012	24 Hours of Barcelona - Class 997	ARC Bratislava	1	1	0	0	1	N/A	**1st**
2012	Dubai 24 Hours - A6-GT	ARC Bratislava	1	0	0	0	0	N/A	DNF
2012	Grand American Rolex Series - GT	Orbit/GMG Racing	1	0	0	0	0	16	68th
2013	International GTSprint Series - Open	Racing Trevor	2	1	0	0	1	72	**1st**
2013	International GTSprint Series - Open	Machánek Racing	2	2	0	0	2	72	**1st**
2014	24 Hours of Nürburgring - SP7	Car Collection Motorsport	1	0	0	0	0	N/A	9th
2015	Central European Zone Championship - D4	ARC Bratislava	?	?	?	?	?	72.5	**3rd**
2015	24H Series - SP2	ARC Bratislava	1	0	0	0	0	0	NC
2015	2 Hours of Fuji	ARC Bratislava	1	0	0	0	0	N/A	6th
2015	3 Hours of Sepang	ARC Bratislava	1	0	0	0	0	N/A	11th
2015	24H Series - 997	Förch Racing by Lukas Motorsport	1	0	0	0	0	0	NC
2015	24H Series - 997	Artthea Sport	1	0	0	0	0	0	NC
2015	24 Hours of Nürburgring - SP7	raceunion Teichmann Racing	1	0	0	0	0	N/A	DNF
2015–16	Asian Le Mans Series - GT	ARC Bratislava	4	0	0	0	0	27	10th
2016	Blancpain GT Series Endurance Cup	ARC Bratislava	4	0	0	0	0	0	NC
2016	Blancpain GT Series Endurance Cup - Am	ARC Bratislava	4	0	0	0	2	63	4th
2016	Touring Car Endurance Series - TCR	ARC Bratislava by Ferry Monster Autosport							
2016–17	Asian Le Mans Series - LMP3	ARC Bratislava	4	1	0	0	2	61	**3rd**
2017	Lamborghini Super Trofeo Europe - Am	ARC Bratislava	12	0	0	1	2	46	8th
2017	Lamborghini Super Trofeo Middle East - Am	ARC Bratislava	6	0	0	0	2	45	4th
2017	Lamborghini Super Trofeo World Final - Am	ARC Bratislava	1	0	0	0	0	N/A	DNF
2017	24 Hours of Le Mans - LMP2	ARC Bratislava	1	0	0	0	0	N/A	19th
2017–18	Asian Le Mans Series - LMP2	ARC Bratislava	4	0	0	0	1	51	**3rd**
2018	International GT Open - Am	ARC Bratislava by VSR	12	1	0	0	8	61	**2nd**
2018	Lamborghini Super Trofeo Europe - Am	ARC Bratislava	10	0	0	0	2	58	6th
2018	Blancpain GT Series Endurance Cup	ARC Bratislava	1	0	0	0	0	0	NC
2018	Blancpain GT Series Endurance Cup - Pro-Am	ARC Bratislava	1	0	0	0	0	2	27th
2018–19	Asian Le Mans Series - LMP2	ARC Bratislava	4	0	0	0	1	51	**3rd**
2019	24 Hours of Le Mans - LMP2	ARC Bratislava	1	0	0	0	0	N/A	DNF
2019	Ultimate Cup Series - Challenge Proto-LMP3	Nutrend PCCR Czech Team	1	0	0	0	0	8	47th
2019	Ultimate Cup Series - Challenge Proto-LMP3	Team Virage	1	0	0	0	0	8	47th
2019–20	Asian Le Mans Series - LMP2 Am	ARC Bratislava	2	0	0	0	1	16	7th
2020	24H GT Series Europe - GTX	ARC Bratislava	2	1	0	0	2	18	**1st**
2020	International GT Open - Am	ARC Bratislava-SK	2	0	0	0	1	10	7th
2021	Asian Le Mans Series - LMP3	ARC Bratislava	4	0	0	0	0	14	10th
2021	FIA World Endurance Championship - LMP2	ARC Bratislava	6	0	0	0	0	8	25th
2021	24 Hours of Le Mans - LMP2	ARC Bratislava	1	0	0	0	0	N/A	15th
2021	24H GT Series - GTX	ARC Bratislava	1	0	0	0	1	0	NC†
2021	ESET V4 Cup - Endurance LMP	ARC Bratislava	3	3	3	3	3	37.5	**2nd**
2022	Asian Le Mans Series - LMP2	ARC Bratislava	4	0	0	0	4	63	**3rd**
2022	FIA World Endurance Championship - LMP2	ARC Bratislava	5	0	0	0	0	0	21st
2022	24 Hours of Le Mans - LMP2	ARC Bratislava	1	0	0	0	0	N/A	21st
2022	24H GT Series - GT3	ARC Bratislava	2	0	0	0	0	7	NC
2022	Prototype Cup Germany	ARC Bratislava	0	0	0	0	0	0	NC
2022	ESET V4 Cup - Endurance LMP	ARC Bratislava	3	2	2	2	2	30	**1st**
2022	6 Hours of Abu Dhabi	ARC Bratislava	1	0	0	0	0	N/A	6th
2022–23	Middle East Trophy - GT3	ARC Bratislava							
2023	Asian Le Mans Series - LMP2	ARC Bratislava	4	0	0	0	0	18	11th
2023	ESET Cup Endurance - Proto	ARC Bratislava	3	3	3	3	3	37.5	**1st**
2023–24	Asian Le Mans Series - LMP2	ARC Bratislava	5	0	0	0	0	7	14th
2023–24	Middle East Trophy - GT3	ARC Bratislava							
2024	24H Series - GT3	ARC Bratislava							
2024	Ultimate Cup Series - Proto P3	ARC Bratislava	1	0	0	0	0	0	NC
2024	Ultimate Cup Series GT Endurance Cup - UCS1	ARC Bratislava	1	0	0	0	1	18	9th
2024	Gulf 12 Hours - GT3 Am	ARC Bratislava	1	0	0	0	0	N/A	DNF
2025	Middle East Trophy - GT3	ARC Bratislava							
2025	24H Series - GT3	ARC Bratislava							
2025	Prototype Cup Germany	ARC Bratislava	2	0	0	0	0	20	13th
2025–26	Asian Le Mans Series - LMP2	ARC Bratislava	6	0	0	0	0	4	17th
2025–26	24H Series Middle East - GT3	ARC Bratislava							
2026	24H Series - GT3	ARC Bratislava	3	0	0	0	1	42	26th
2026	Italian GT Championship Endurance Cup - GT3	ARC Bratislava	1	0	0	0	0	0	NC†

^{†} As Konôpka was a guest driver, he was ineligible to score points.^{*} Season still in progress.

=== Complete 24 Hours of Le Mans results ===
Year	Team	Co-Drivers	Car	Class	Laps	Pos.	Class Pos.
2006	(Japan) T2M Motorsport	(Japan) Yutaka Yamagishi (France) Jean-René de Fournoux	Porsche 911 GT3-RS	GT2	196	DNF	DNF
2010	(Germany) Team Felbermayr-Proton	(Austria) Horst Felbermayr (Austria) Horst Felbermayr Jr.	Porsche 997 GT3-RSR	GT2	304	24th	8th
2017	(Slovakia) ARC Bratislava	(Latvia) Konstantīns Calko (Netherlands) Rik Breukers	Ligier JS P217-Gibson	LMP2	314	45th	19th
2019	(Slovakia) ARC Bratislava	(Russia) Konstantin Tereshchenko (Sweden) Henning Enqvist	Ligier JS P217-Gibson	LMP2	160	DNF	DNF
2021	(Slovakia) ARC Bratislava	(United Kingdom) Oliver Webb (Slovakia) Matej Konôpka	Oreca 07-Gibson	LMP2	342	24th	15th
2021	(Slovakia) ARC Bratislava	(United Kingdom) Oliver Webb (Slovakia) Matej Konôpka	Oreca 07-Gibson	LMP2 Pro-Am	342	24th	6th
2022	(Slovakia) ARC Bratislava	(Netherlands) Bent Viscaal (France) Tristan Vautier	Oreca 07-Gibson	LMP2	360	26th	21st
2022	(Slovakia) ARC Bratislava	(Netherlands) Bent Viscaal (France) Tristan Vautier	Oreca 07-Gibson	LMP2 Pro-Am	360	26th	6th

=== Complete Asian Le Mans Series results ===
(key) (Races in bold indicate pole position) (Races in italics indicate fastest lap)

Year	Team	Class	Car	Engine	1	2	3	4	5	6	Pos.	Points
2015–16	ARC Bratislava	GT	Audi R8 LMS Ultra	Audi 5.2 L V10	FUJ; 4	SEP1; 8	BUR; 6	SEP2; 8			10th	28
2016–17	ARC Bratislava	LMP3	Ginetta-Juno LMP3	Nissan VK50 5.0 L V8	ZHU; 4	FUJ; 2	BUR; 1	SEP; 7			3rd	61
2017–18	ARC Bratislava	LMP2	Ligier JS P2	Nissan VK45DE 4.5 L V8	ZHU; 3	FUJ; 4	BUR; 4	SEP; 4			3rd	51
2018–19	ARC Bratislava	LMP2	Ligier JS P2	Nissan VK45DE 4.5 L V8	SHA; 4	FUJ; 3	BUR; 4	SEP; 4			3rd	51
2019–20	ARC Bratislava	LMP2 Am	Ligier JS P2	Nissan VK45DE 4.5 L V8	**SHA**; Ret	BEN; 3	SEP	BUR			7th	16
2021	ARC Bratislava	LMP3	Ginetta G61-LT-P3	Nissan VK56DE 5.6L V8	DUB; 1 Ret	DUB; 2; 8	ABU; 1; 6	ABU; 2; 9			10th	14
2022	ARC Bratislava	LMP2	Ligier JS P217	Gibson GK428 4.2 L V8	DUB; 1; 4	DUB; 2; 4	ABU; 1; 5	ABU; 2; 4			4th	51
2023	ARC Bratislava	LMP2	Oreca 07	Gibson GK428 4.2 L V8	DUB; 1; 7	DUB; 2; 9	ABU; 1; 8	ABU; 2; 7			9th	18
2023–24	ARC Bratislava	LMP2	Oreca 07	Gibson GK428 4.2 L V8	SEP; 1; 10	SEP; 2; 10	DUB; 10	ABU; 1; 11	ABU; 2; 8		11th	7
2025–26	ARC Bratislava	LMP2	Oreca 07	Gibson GK428 4.2 L V8	SEP; 1; 10	SEP; 2; 10	DUB; 1 Ret	DUB; 2; 9	ABU; 1 Ret	ABU; 2 Ret	17th	4

=== Complete FIA World Endurance Championship results ===
(key) (Races in bold indicate pole position) (Races in italics indicate fastest lap)

Year	Entrant	Class	Chassis	Engine	1	2	3	4	5	6	Rank	Points
2021	ARC Bratislava	LMP2	Ligier JS P217	Gibson GK428 4.2 L V8	SPA; Ret	ALG; 11	MNZ; 10				25th	8
2021	ARC Bratislava	LMP2	Oreca 07	Gibson GK428 4.2 L V8				LMS; 9	BHR; 10	BHR; 11	25th	8
2022	ARC Bratislava	LMP2	Oreca 07	Gibson GK428 4.2 L V8	SEB; 13	SPA; Ret	LMS; 12	MNZ; 11	FUJ	BHR; 13	23rd	0
