= Misano World Circuit =

Motorsport track in Italy

Misano World Circuit Marco Simoncelli
- Grand Prix Circuit (2008–present)
- Location: Misano Adriatico, Province of Rimini, Emilia-Romagna, Italy
- Coordinates: 43°57′41″N 12°41′0″E
- Capacity: 60,000
- FIA Grade: 2 (2 layouts); 3E (Formula E)
- Broke ground: 1970
- Opened: 4 August 1972; 54 years ago
- Former names: Misano World Circuit (2007–2012); Circuito Internazionale Santa Monica Misano (1998–2006); Autodromo Santa Monica (1972–1997)
- Major events: Current: Grand Prix motorcycle racing Italian motorcycle Grand Prix (1980, 1982, 1984, 1989–1991, 1993); San Marino motorcycle Grand Prix (1985–1987, 2007–present); Emilia Romagna motorcycle Grand Prix (2020–2021, 2024); World SBK (1991, 1993–2012, 2014–2019, 2021–present); TCR World Tour (2026); GT World Challenge Europe (2015–present); ETRC Misano Grand Prix Truck (1992–2019, 2021–present); International GT Open (2026); Former: Formula E Misano ePrix (2024); Lamborghini Super Trofeo World Finals (2021, 2025); TCR Europe (2016, 2025); FREC (2020, 2025); FIM EWC (1977–1978, 1980); DTM (2018–2019); FIA Formula 3 European Championship (2018)
- Website: https://www.misanocircuit.com

Grand Prix Circuit (2008–present)
- Length: 4.226 km (2.626 mi)
- Turns: 16
- Race lap record: 1:20.042 ( (Latvia) Haralds Slegelmilhs, Dallara T12, 2024, FR 3.5)

Short Truck Circuit (2008–present)
- Length: 4.048 km (2.515 mi)
- Turns: 16
- Race lap record: 2:01.686 ( (Hungary) Norbert Kiss, MAN TGS, 2025, Truck racing)

Formula E Circuit (2024)
- Length: 3.381 km (2.101 mi)
- Turns: 14
- Race lap record: 1:18.682 ( (Portugal) António Félix da Costa, Porsche 99X Electric, 2024, F-E)

Grand Prix Circuit (2007)
- Length: 4.180 km (2.597 mi)
- Turns: 16
- Race lap record: 1:32.196 ( (Mexico) Pablo Sánchez, Dallara F304, 2007, F3)

Grand Prix Circuit (1993–2006)
- Length: 4.060 km (2.523 mi)
- Turns: 12
- Race lap record: 1:19.697 ( (Venezuela) Pastor Maldonado, Dallara T05, 2006, FR 3.5)

Grand Prix Circuit (1972–1992)
- Length: 3.488 km (2.167 mi)
- Turns: 11
- Race lap record: 1:08.500 ( (Brazil) Roberto Moreno, Ralt RH6/84, 1984, F2)

The Misano World Circuit (officially known as Misano World Circuit Marco Simoncelli or Misano Circuit Sic 58, and before 2006 called Circuito Internazionale Santa Monica Misano) is a 4.226 km (2.626 mi) race track located next to the town of Misano Adriatico (Province of Rimini) in the frazione of Santa Monica-Cella. Originally designed in 1969 as a length of 3.488 km (2.167 mi), it hosted its first event in 1972. In 1993, the track length was increased to 4.064 km (2.525 mi).

As of 2007, it began hosting the San Marino and Rimini Riviera motorcycle Grand Prix as part of the MotoGP World Championship.

In 2012, the track was renamed to commemorate Marco Simoncelli, a local motorcycle racer who died in 2011.

== History ==
The circuit was designed in 1969; it was built from 1970 and 1972, and inaugurated that year. Its initial length was 3.488 km (2.167 mi) and only had a small, open pit area. This version of the circuit hosted three editions of the San Marino motorcycle Grand Prix, from the 1985 season to the 1987 season. In 1993 it was modified for the first time: the track length was increased to 4.060 km (2.523 mi), with the possibility to race both the long and the old short loop; moreover, new facilities and new pit garages were built. It was at Misano during the 1993 Italian Grand Prix that the defending 500 cc World Champion Wayne Rainey's career ended after he fell and suffered a broken spine. Between 1996 and 2001 all facilities were improved further, adding more pits and stands. In 2005, a new access point to the circuit was built, Via Daijiro Kato, in honor of the late Japanese rider, killed during the 2003 Japanese Grand Prix, whose in-season race home was in the Portoverde frazione of Misano Adriatico.

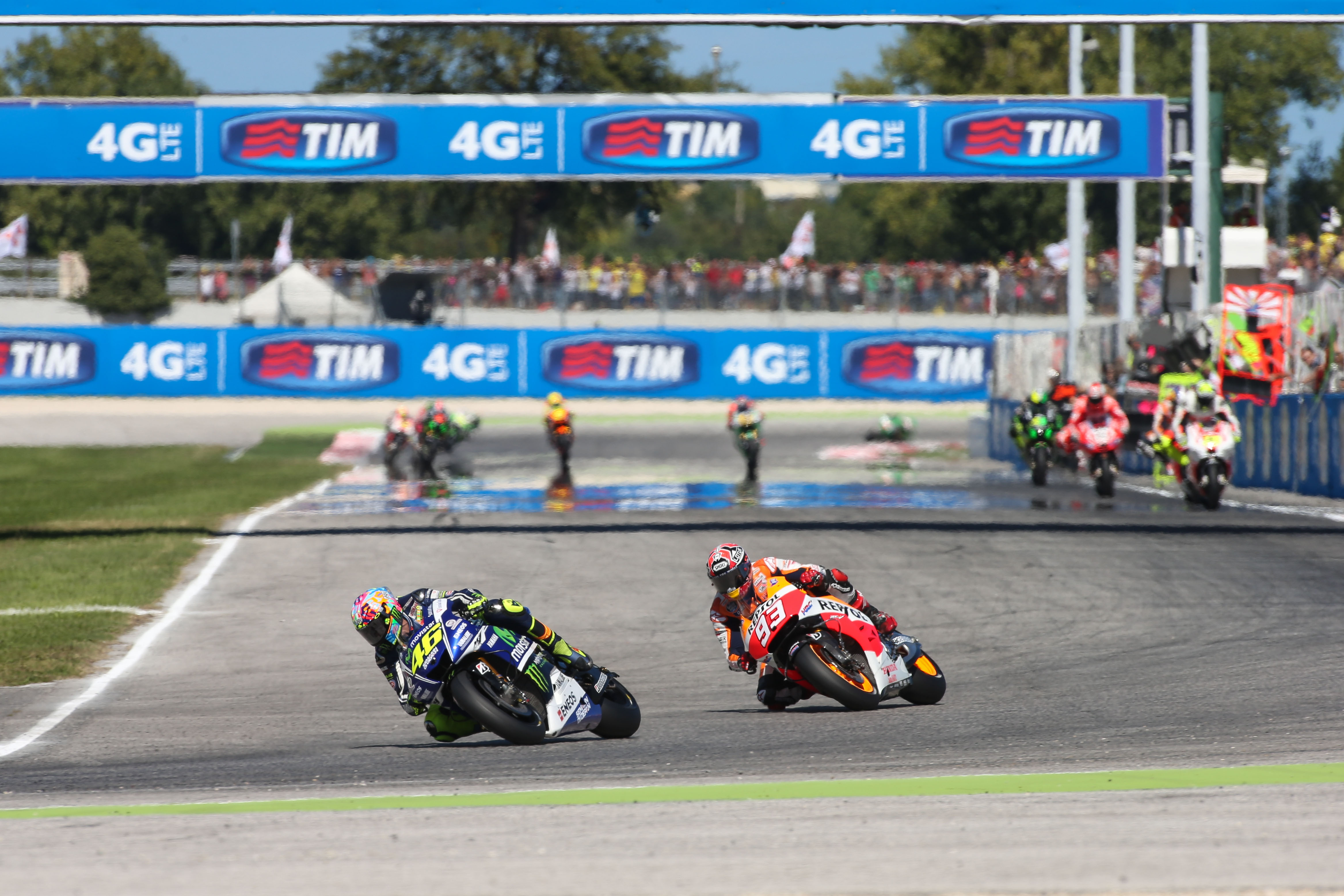
Main straight

In order to host again the World motorcycle championship, the circuit was extensively modified in 2006. The circuit direction was changed to clockwise direction, the track length was brought to 4.180 km (2.597 mi), track width has been widened to 14 m (15 yd), facilities were improved, and all security measures have been applied. The first MotoGP race held on the circuit after the modifications was the 2007 San Marino and Rimini Riviera motorcycle Grand Prix, which was won by "home" marque Ducati.

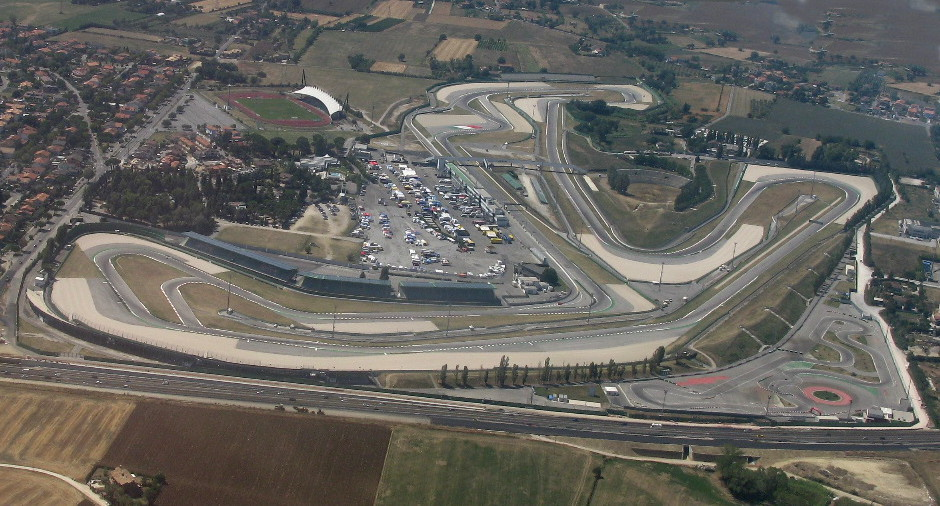
Aerial view of the circuit

During the 2010 Moto2 event, Japanese rider Shoya Tomizawa was killed after losing control of his bike and being subsequently struck by both Scott Redding and Alex de Angelis. Coincidentally this incident occurred 17 years to the day of Wayne Rainey's career ending incident also at Misano.

On 3 November 2011, the circuit owners announced that it would be named after Marco Simoncelli, an Italian motorcyclist who died during the 2011 Malaysian Grand Prix in Sepang a week prior. Simoncelli was born in nearby Cattolica and had lived from childhood in Coriano. On 8 June 2012 the track's new name was confirmed at the San Marino round of the Superbike World Championship.

== Layout history ==
Misano World Circuit Marco Simoncelli Layout History
Grand Prix Circuit (1972–1992)

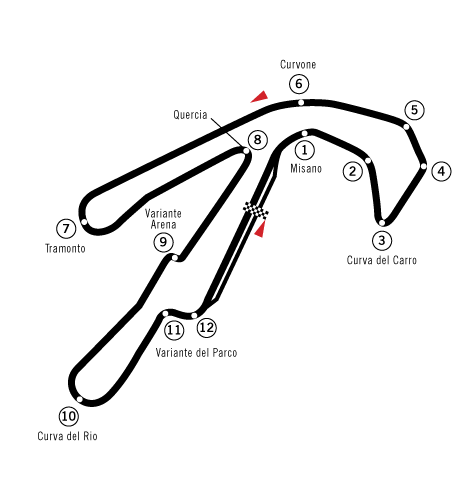
Grand Prix Circuit (1993–2006)

Grand Prix Circuit (2007)

Grand Prix Circuit (2008–present)

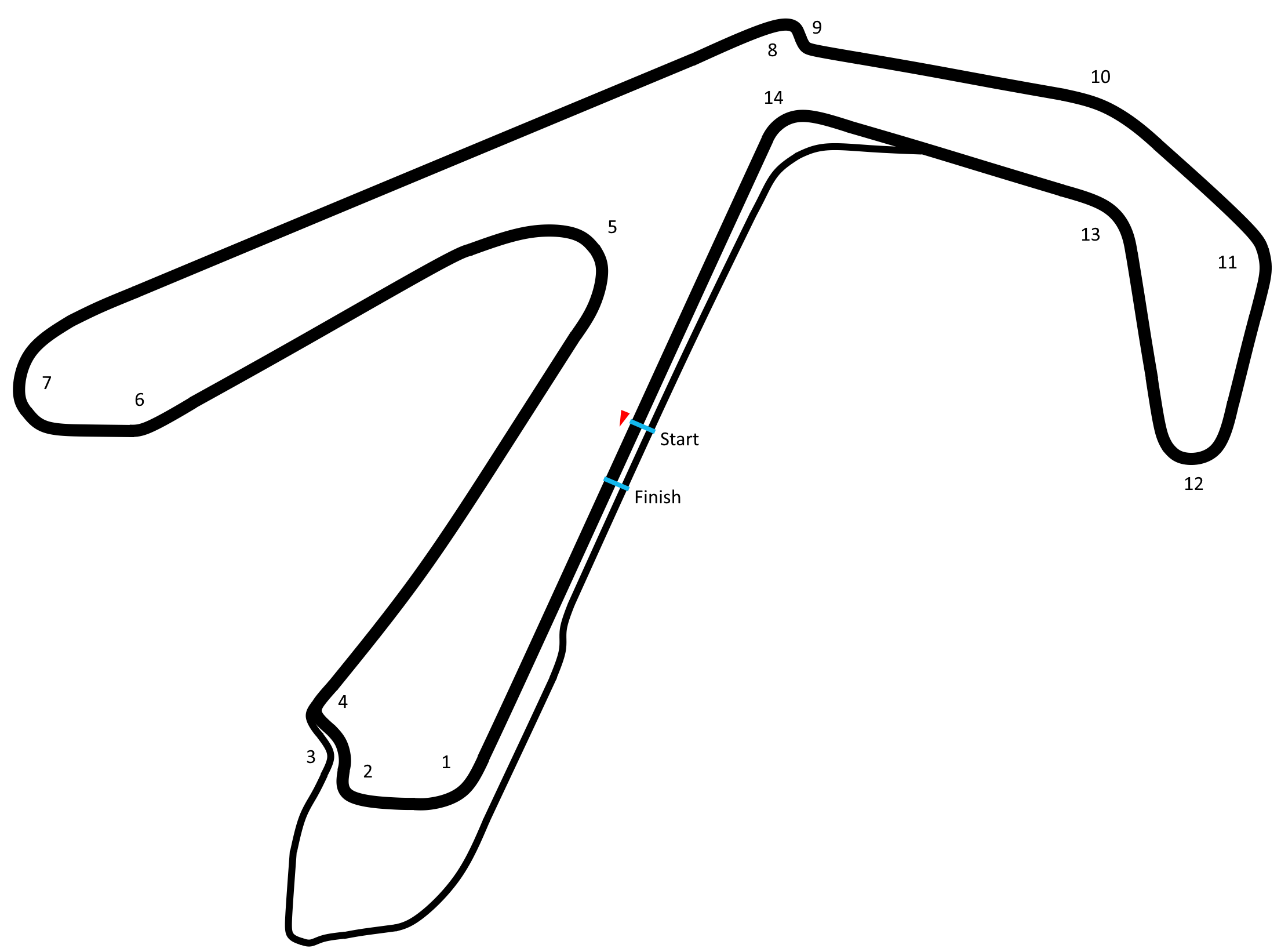
Formula E Circuit (2024)

== Events ==
Current

- April: CIV Superbike Championship
- May: European Truck Racing Championship Misano Grand Prix Truck, TCR World Tour ACI Racing Weekend Misano, Italian GT Championship, Italian F4 Championship, Porsche Carrera Cup Italia
- June: Superbike World Championship, International GT Open, Supersport World Championship, Sportbike World Championship, Euroformula Open Championship, FIM Women's Circuit Racing World Championship, GT Cup Open Europe
- July: GT World Challenge Europe, GT2 European Series, GT4 European Series, McLaren Trophy Europe, CIV Superbike Championship Racing Night
- September: Grand Prix motorcycle racing San Marino and Rimini Riviera motorcycle Grand Prix, Grand Prix motorcycle racing, Red Bull MotoGP Rookies Cup, TCR Italian Series ACI Racing Weekend Misano, Italian F4 Championship, Porsche Carrera Cup Italia
- November: TCR European Endurance Touring Car Series FX Racing Weekend Misano

Future

- Ferrari Challenge Europe (2007–2008, 2020, 2023, 2025, 2027)
- Lamborghini Super Trofeo Europe (2027)
- Ultimate Cup Series (2022, 2027)

Former

- 24H Series
  - Michelin 12H Misano (2024–2025)
- 3000 Pro Series (2005)
- BOSS GP (2021–2025)
- Deutsche Tourenwagen Masters (2018–2019)
- Eurocup Formula Renault 2.0 (1995, 1997, 2006)
- Eurocup Mégane Trophy (2006)
- Euroseries 3000 (1999–2000, 2005–2006, 2008)
- European Formula Two Championship (1973, 1975–1984)
- European Touring Car Championship (1986, 2000)
- Ferrari Challenge Finali Mondiali (2002, 2021)
- FIA European Formula 3 Championship (1980–1981, 1983)
- FIA Formula 3 European Championship (2018)
- FIA Formula E World Championship
  - Misano ePrix (2024)
- FIA Sportscar Championship (1998)
- FIM Endurance World Championship (1977–1978, 1980)
- Formula ACI/CSAI Abarth Italian Championship (2005–2013)
- Formula Regional European Championship (2020, 2025)
- Formula Renault 2.0 Alps (2013, 2015)
- Formula Renault 3.5 Series (2006)
- French F4 Championship (2023)
- Grand Prix motorcycle racing
  - Emilia Romagna motorcycle Grand Prix (2020–2021, 2024)
  - Italian motorcycle Grand Prix (1980, 1982, 1984, 1989–1991, 1993)
- GTR Euroseries (1998)
- International GTSprint Series (2011)
- Italian Formula Renault Championship (2000–2009)
- Italian Formula Three Championship (1972–1973, 1978–2012)
- Lamborghini Super Trofeo World Finals (2021, 2025)
- MotoE World Championship
  - San Marino and Rimini Riviera eRace (2019–2025)
- Porsche Carrera Cup France (2019, 2025)
- Porsche Carrera Cup Germany (1999)
- Porsche Sports Cup Deutschland (2005, 2022–2023)
- Sidecar World Championship (1990–1991, 1999–2003)
- Super Tourenwagen Cup (1999)
- Supersport 300 World Championship (2017–2025)
- Superstars Series (2004–2008, 2011)
- TCR Europe Touring Car Series (2016, 2025)
- W Series (2019)
- World Sportscar Championship (1978)

== Lap records ==
As of September 2026, the fastest official race lap records at the Misano World Circuit Marco Simoncelli are listed as:

Category	Time	Driver	Vehicle	Event
Grand Prix Circuit (2008–present): 4.226 km (2.626 mi)
BOSS GP/Formula Renault 3.5	1:20.042	Haralds Šlēgelmilhs	Dallara T12	2024 Misano BOSS GP round
BOSS GP/GP2	1:22.822	Sophia Flörsch	Dallara GP2/11	2025 Misano BOSS GP round
F3000	1:25.380	Clivio Piccione	Lola B02/50	2008 Misano Euroseries 3000 round
Class 1 Touring Cars	1:27.291	Robin Frijns	Audi RS5 Turbo DTM 2019	2019 Misano DTM round
Euroformula Open	1:27.932	Alessandro Famularo	Dallara 324	2026 Misano Euroformula Open round
Formula 3	1:28.279	Enaam Ahmed	Dallara F315	2018 Misano F3 European Championship round
Formula Regional	1:29.625	Freddie Slater	Tatuus F3 T-318	2025 Misano FREC round
DTM	1:30.288	Augusto Farfus	BMW M4 DTM	2018 Misano DTM round
MotoGP	1:30.877	Francesco Bagnaia	Ducati Desmosedici GP24	2024 Emilia Romagna motorcycle Grand Prix
LMP3	1:31.159	Lucca Allen	Ligier JS P320	2022 Misano Ultimate Cup round
GT3	1:31.939	Raffaele Marciello	Mercedes-AMG GT3 Evo	2022 Misano GT World Challenge Europe Sprint Cup round
World SBK	1:31.945	Nicolò Bulega	Ducati Panigale V4 R	2026 Misano World SBK round
Formula Renault 2.0	1:32.765	Jake Hughes	Tatuus FR2.0/13	2015 Misano Formula Renault 2.0 Alps round
Lamborghini Super Trofeo	1:33.265	Loris Spinelli	Lamborghini Huracán Super Trofeo Evo2	2022 Misano Lamborghini Super Trofeo Europe round
Group CN	1:33.716	Lucas Medina	Wolf GB08 Thunder	2022 Misano CISP round
Ferrari Challenge	1:33.912	Felix Hirsiger	Ferrari 296 Challenge	2025 Misano Ferrari Challenge Europe round
Formula 4	1:34.368	Sebastián Montoya	Tatuus F4-T014	2021 Misano Italian F4 round
Moto2	1:34.666	Filip Salač	Kalex Moto2	2026 San Marino and Rimini Riviera motorcycle Grand Prix
SRO GT2	1:34.906	Pierre Kaffer	Audi R8 LMS GT2	2024 Misano GT2 European Series round
Porsche Carrera Cup	1:35.447	Aldo Festante	Porsche 911 (992 II) Cup	2026 1st Misano Porsche Carrera Cup Italia round
Formula Abarth	1:35.527	Michael Heche	Tatuus FA010	2011 Misano Formula Abarth round
World SSP	1:37.114	Adrián Huertas	Ducati Panigale V2	2024 Misano World SSP round
GT2	1:37.195	Emanuele Moncini	Ferrari F430 GTC	2010 Misano Italian GT round
250cc	1:38.909	Marco Simoncelli	Gilera RSA 250	2008 San Marino and Rimini Riviera motorcycle Grand Prix
MotoE	1:39.862	Matteo Ferrari	Ducati V21L	2024 San Marino and Rimini Riviera motorcycle Grand Prix
GT4	1:39.938	Matthew George	Mercedes-AMG GT4	2025 12 Hours of Misano
Moto3	1:40.366	Máximo Quiles	KTM RC250GP	2026 San Marino and Rimini Riviera motorcycle Grand Prix
TCR Touring Car	1:41.044	Santiago Urrutia	Geely Preface TCR	2026 Misano TCR World Tour round
Sportbike	1:41.572	Filippo Bianchi	Aprilia RS 660 Factory	2026 1st Misano CIV Sportbike round
World SPB	1:42.697	Matteo Vannucci	Aprilia RS 660 Factory	2026 Misano World SPB round
125cc	1:43.195	Marc Márquez	Derbi RSA 125	2010 San Marino and Rimini Riviera motorcycle Grand Prix
World WCR	1:47.564	Roberta Ponziani	Yamaha YZF-R7	2026 Misano World WCR round
Supersport 300	1:48.749	Mirko Gennai	Kawasaki Ninja 400	2024 Misano Supersport 300 round
Renault Clio Cup	1.52.080	Cristian Ricciarini	Renault Clio R.S. IV	2020 Misano Renault Clio Cup Italy round
Truck racing	2:04.566	Jochen Hahn	MAN TGS	2019 Misano ETRC round
Short Truck Circuit (2008–present): 4.048 km (2.515 mi)
Truck racing	2:01.686	Norbert Kiss	MAN TGS	2025 Misano ETRC round
Formula E Circuit (2024): 3.381 km (2.101 mi)
Formula E	1:18.682	António Félix da Costa	Porsche 99X Electric	2024 Misano ePrix
Grand Prix Circuit (2007): 4.180 km (2.597 mi)
Formula 3	1:32.196	Pablo Sánchez	Dallara F304	2007 Misano Italian F3 round
MotoGP	1:34.649	Casey Stoner	Ducati Desmosedici GP7	2007 San Marino and Rimini Riviera motorcycle Grand Prix
Formula Renault 2.0	1:35.942	Brendon Hartley	Tatuus FR2000	2007 Misano Formula Renault 2.0 Italia round
World SBK	1:36.022	Troy Bayliss	Ducati 999 F07	2007 Misano World SBK round
250cc	1:38.074	Hiroshi Aoyama	KTM 250 FRR	2007 San Marino and Rimini Riviera motorcycle Grand Prix
GT2	1:38.475	Stefano Livio	Ferrari F430 GTC	2007 Misano Italian GT round
World SSP	1:39.109	Anthony West	Yamaha YZF-R6	2007 Misano World SSP round
GT3	1:39.301	Giacomo Piccini	Lamborghini Gallardo GT3	2007 Misano Italian GT round
Porsche Carrera Cup	1:39.548	Stefano Comandini	Porsche 911 (997 I) GT3 Cup	2007 Porsche Carrera Cup Italia round
Ferrari Challenge	1:40.378	Nicola Cadei	Ferrari F430 Challenge	2007 Misano Ferrari Challenge Italia round
Formula Abarth	1:42.259	Marco Zipoli	Gloria B5-10Y	2007 Misano Formula Azzurra round
125cc	1:42.811	Mattia Pasini	Aprilia RSA 125	2007 San Marino and Rimini Riviera motorcycle Grand Prix
Short Truck Circuit (2007): 4.000 km (2.485 mi)
Truck racing	2:01.710	Markus Bösiger	Freightliner	2007 Misano European Truck Racing Championship round
Grand Prix Circuit (1993–2006): 4.060 km (2.523 mi)
BOSS GP/Formula Renault 3.5	1:19.697	Pastor Maldonado	Dallara T05	2006 Misano 2006 Formula Renault 3.5 Series round
Formula 3000	1:22.185	Giacomo Ricci	Lola B02/50	2006 Misano Euroseries 3000 round
WSC	1:25.709	Didier de Radiguès	Riley & Scott Mk III	1998 Misano International Sports Racing Series round
Formula 3	1:26.087	Álvaro Parente	Dallara F303	2003 Misano Italian F3 round
GT1 (GTS)	1:28.565	Miguel Ramos	Maserati MC12 GT1	2006 Misano Italian GT round
Formula Renault 2.0	1:29.833	Davide Valsecchi	Tatuus FR2000	2005 Misano Formula Renault 2.0 Italia round
GT2	1:33.207	Matteo Bobbi	Ferrari F430 GTC	2006 Misano Italian GT round
Super Touring	1:34.179	Nicola Larini	Alfa Romeo 156 TS	1999 1st Misano Italian Superturismo round
500cc	1:34.289	Mick Doohan	Honda NSR500	1993 Italian motorcycle Grand Prix
World SBK	1:34.913	Troy Bayliss	Ducati 998 F02	2002 Misano World SBK round
250cc	1:35.782	Tetsuya Harada	Yamaha TZ250M	1993 Italian motorcycle Grand Prix
Porsche Carrera Cup	1:36.139	Monforte Maurizio	Porsche 911 (996 II) GT3 Cup	2006 Porsche GT3 Cup Challenge Italia round
Eurocup Mégane Trophy	1:36.165	Jaap van Lagen	Renault Mégane Renault Sport	2006 Misano Eurocup Mégane Trophy round
Formula Abarth	1:36.360	Giuseppe Terranova	Gloria B5-10Y	2005 Misano Formula Azzurra round
Ferrari Challenge	1:36.511	Vito Postiglione	Ferrari F430 Challenge	2006 Misano Ferrari Challenge Italia round
GT3	1:37.057	Luca Polato	Dodge Viper Competition Coupe	2006 Misano Italian GT round
GT1	1:37.449	Pierre-Alexandre Popoff	Ferrari F40	1994 Misano Italian GT round
World SSP	1:37.628	Broc Parkes	Yamaha YZF-R6	2006 Misano World SSP round
GT2 (GT1)	1:38.235	Renato Mastropietro	Porsche 911 GT2	2000 Misano Italian GT round
Truck racing	1:40.327	Antonio Albacete	MAN TGA	2006 Misano European Truck Racing Championship round
125cc	1:41.088	Dirk Raudies	Honda RS125R	1993 Italian motorcycle Grand Prix
Group 2	1:43.230	Peter Mücke	Ford Capri RS	2006 Misano FIA GTC round (TC '76)
Renault Clio Cup	1:47.185	Massimiliano Pedalà	Renault Clio RS	2006 Misano Renault Clio Cup Italia round
Grand Prix Circuit (1972–1992): 3.488 km (2.167 mi)
Formula 2	1:08.500	Roberto Moreno	Ralt RH6/84	1984 Gran Premio dell'Adriatico
Formula 3	1:13.241	Marcello Ventre	Ralt RT35	1991 Misano Italian F3 round
Group 7	1:13.600	Leo Kinnunen	Porsche 917/10 TC	1973 Misano Interserie round
500cc	1:15.892	Wayne Rainey	Yamaha YZR500	1991 Italian motorcycle Grand Prix
Group 5 Sports Cars	1:16.600	Jean-Pierre Jabouille	Alpine A441	1974 Trophée Marlboro - Etienae Aigner Misano
250cc	1:17.965	Luca Cadalora	Honda NSR250	1991 Italian motorcycle Grand Prix
Group A	1:18.278	Nicola Larini	Alfa Romeo 155 GTA	1992 Misano Italian Superturismo round
Group 5 Special Production	1:18.300	Toine Hezemans	Porsche 935/77A	1978 Misano 6 Hours
World SBK	1:18.611	Rob Phillis	Kawasaki ZXR-750	1991 Misano World SBK round
Group B	1:23.157	Luca Sartori	Ferrari F40	1992 Misano Italian GT round
125cc	1:23.436	Fausto Gresini	Honda RS125R	1991 Italian motorcycle Grand Prix
Group 4	1:24.000	Clemens Schickentanz	Porsche Carrera RSR	1975 Misano European GT Championship round
350cc	1:24.540	Carlos Lavado	Yamaha TZ 350	1980 Nations motorcycle Grand Prix
80cc	1:30.136	Peter Öttl	Krauser 80	1989 Nations motorcycle Grand Prix
50cc	1:40.600	Stefan Dörflinger	Kreidler 50 GP	1980 Nations motorcycle Grand Prix

== Fatalities ==
- Shoya Tomizawa – 2010 San Marino and Rimini Riviera motorcycle Grand Prix
