= 2019 European Truck Racing Championship =

The 2019 FIA European Truck Racing Championship is a motor-racing championship using highly tuned tractor units. It is the 35th year of the championship. The eight-round season began May 25 at the Misano World Circuit and ended October 6 at the Circuito del Jarama. Jochen Hahn dominated the season en route to his sixth career ETRC championship, securing the title one round early at the Bugatti Circuit in France.

== Teams and drivers ==
Team	Manufacturer	No.	Drivers	Rounds	Class
(United Kingdom) Anderson Racing	MAN	7	(United Kingdom) Jamie Anderson	All	G
(Czech Republic) Buggyra Racing	Freightliner	22	(United Kingdom) Oliver Janes	All	G
(Czech Republic) Buggyra Racing	Freightliner	55	(Czech Republic) Adam Lacko	All	
(Czech Republic) Czech Racing Truck Team	MAN	9	(Czech Republic) Frankie Vojtíšek	4	G
(Germany) Don't Touch Racing	Iveco	11	(Germany) André Kursim	All	
(Netherlands) EK Truck Race	Scania	15	(Netherlands) Erwin Kleinnagelvoort	4–8	G
(France) Franck Conti Racing	Volvo	39	(France) Franck Conti	4	G
(Germany) Heinrich-Clemens Hecker	MAN	25	(Germany) Heinrich-Clemens Hecker	4	G
(France) Jennifer Janiec	MAN	75	(France) Jennifer Janiec	4	G
(France) Lion Truck Racing	MAN	6	(France) Anthony Janiec	1, 4–5, 8	
(France) Lion Truck Racing	MAN	20	(France) Tèo Calvet	4	G
(Finland) Mad Croc Racing	Freightliner	71	(Finland) Mika Mäkinen	5	
(Portugal) Reboconorte Racing Truck Team	MAN	14	(Portugal) José Rodrigues	1–2, 4–8	
(Portugal) Reboconorte Racing Truck Team	MAN	38	(Portugal) José Eduardo Rodrigues	1, 4, 6–8	G
(Portugal) Reboconorte Racing Truck Team	MAN	38	(Portugal) Eduardo Rodrigues	2–3, 5	G
(Germany) Reinert Racing GmbH	Iveco	77	(Germany) René Reinert	All	
(Germany) SL Trucksport	MAN	30	(Germany) Sascha Lenz	All	
(United Kingdom) T-Sport Racing	MAN	37	(United Kingdom) Terry Gibbon	2, 4–8	G
(Germany) Tankpool 24 Racing	Mercedes-Benz	5	(Hungary) Norbert Kiss	All	
(Germany) Tankpool 24 Racing	Mercedes-Benz	24	(Germany) Fabio Citignola	All	G
(Germany) Team Hahn Racing	Iveco	1	(Germany) Jochen Hahn	All	
(France) Team Orsini Racing	Mercedes-Benz	19	(France) Dominique Orsini	1–3, 5–8	G
(France) Team Robineau	MAN	21	(France) Thomas Robineau	1, 4	G
(Germany) Team Schwabentruck	Iveco	27	(Germany) Gerd Körber	4	
(Germany) Team Schwabentruck	Iveco	44	(Germany) Stephanie Halm	All	
(United Kingdom) TOR Truck Racing	MAN	17	(United Kingdom) Shane Brereton	4, 7	
(Germany) Truck Sport Lutz Bernau	MAN	23	(Spain) Antonio Albacete	All	
(Germany) Truck Sport Lutz Bernau	MAN	64	(Spain) Luis Recuenco	All	G
Entries ineligible to score points^{1}
(United Kingdom) David Jenkins Motorsport Developments	MAN	69	(United Kingdom) David Jenkins	6	G

Icon	Class
G	Grammer Truck Cup

^{1} Drivers who did not participate in any of the first five events of the championship are not eligible to score points.

== Calendar and winners ==
All rounds from the 2018 season returned for 2019. A switch in order between the rounds in Slovakia and Germany was the only change in the schedule from the preceding year.

Round		Circuit	Date	Pole position	Fastest lap	Winning driver	Winning team	Grammer Cup winner
1	R1	(Italy) Misano World Circuit	May 25–26	(Germany) Jochen Hahn	(Germany) Jochen Hahn	(Germany) Jochen Hahn	(Germany) Team Hahn Racing	(Spain) Luis Recuenco
1	R2	(Italy) Misano World Circuit	May 25–26		(Germany) René Reinert	(Germany) René Reinert	(Germany) Reinert Racing GmbH	(Spain) Luis Recuenco
1	R3	(Italy) Misano World Circuit	May 25–26	(Hungary) Norbert Kiss	(Hungary) Norbert Kiss	(Hungary) Norbert Kiss	(Germany) Tankpool 24 Racing	(United Kingdom) Oliver Janes
1	R4	(Italy) Misano World Circuit	May 25–26		(France) Anthony Janiec	(Germany) Jochen Hahn	(Germany) Team Hahn Racing	(United Kingdom) Jamie Anderson
2	R1	(Hungary) Hungaroring	June 22–23	(Germany) Jochen Hahn	(Germany) Jochen Hahn	(Germany) Jochen Hahn	(Germany) Team Hahn Racing	(United Kingdom) Oliver Janes
2	R2	(Hungary) Hungaroring	June 22–23		(Germany) Sascha Lenz	(Germany) Sascha Lenz	(Germany) SL Trucksport	(United Kingdom) Terry Gibbon
2	R3	(Hungary) Hungaroring	June 22–23	(Germany) Jochen Hahn	(Germany) Jochen Hahn	(Germany) Jochen Hahn	(Germany) Team Hahn Racing	(United Kingdom) Jamie Anderson
2	R4	(Hungary) Hungaroring	June 22–23		(Germany) Jochen Hahn	(Germany) André Kursim	(Germany) Don't Touch Racing	(United Kingdom) Jamie Anderson
3	R1	Slovakia Ring	July 6–7	(Germany) Jochen Hahn	(Germany) Jochen Hahn	(Germany) Jochen Hahn	(Germany) Team Hahn Racing	(Spain) Luis Recuenco
3	R2	Slovakia Ring	July 6–7		(Hungary) Norbert Kiss	(Germany) Sascha Lenz	(Germany) SL Trucksport	(United Kingdom) Jamie Anderson
3	R3	Slovakia Ring	July 6–7	(Germany) Jochen Hahn	(Germany) Jochen Hahn	(Germany) Jochen Hahn	(Germany) Team Hahn Racing	(United Kingdom) Jamie Anderson
3	R4	Slovakia Ring	July 6–7		(Hungary) Norbert Kiss	(Spain) Antonio Albacete	(Germany) Truck Sport Lutz Bernau	(United Kingdom) Jamie Anderson
4	R1	(Germany) Nürburgring	July 20–21	(Germany) Jochen Hahn	(Spain) Antonio Albacete	(Germany) Jochen Hahn	(Germany) Team Hahn Racing	(France) Thomas Robineau
4	R2	(Germany) Nürburgring	July 20–21		(Germany) Jochen Hahn	(Czech Republic) Adam Lacko	(Czech Republic) Buggyra Racing	(United Kingdom) Jamie Anderson
4	R3	(Germany) Nürburgring	July 20–21	(Germany) Jochen Hahn	(Germany) Sascha Lenz	(Germany) Jochen Hahn	(Germany) Team Hahn Racing	(France) Thomas Robineau
4	R4	(Germany) Nürburgring	July 20–21		(Spain) Antonio Albacete	(Hungary) Norbert Kiss	(Germany) Tankpool 24 Racing	(Germany) Fabio Citignola
5	R1	(Czech Republic) Autodrom Most	August 31–September 1	(Germany) Jochen Hahn	(Germany) Jochen Hahn	(Germany) Jochen Hahn	(Germany) Team Hahn Racing	(United Kingdom) Terry Gibbon
5	R2	(Czech Republic) Autodrom Most	August 31–September 1		(Germany) Jochen Hahn	(Germany) René Reinert	(Germany) Reinert Racing GmbH	(United Kingdom) Terry Gibbon
5	R3	(Czech Republic) Autodrom Most	August 31–September 1	(Germany) Jochen Hahn	Race 3 and 4 cancelled due to heavy rain.			
5	R4	(Czech Republic) Autodrom Most	August 31–September 1		Race 3 and 4 cancelled due to heavy rain.			
6	R1	(Belgium) Circuit Zolder	September 14–15	(Germany) Jochen Hahn	(Spain) Antonio Albacete	(Germany) Jochen Hahn	(Germany) Team Hahn Racing	(United Kingdom) Terry Gibbon
6	R2	(Belgium) Circuit Zolder	September 14–15		(Germany) Stephanie Halm	(Germany) René Reinert	(Germany) Reinert Racing GmbH	(United Kingdom) Oliver Janes
6	R3	(Belgium) Circuit Zolder	September 14–15	(Germany) Jochen Hahn	(Germany) Jochen Hahn	(Germany) Jochen Hahn	(Germany) Team Hahn Racing	(United Kingdom) Jamie Anderson
6	R4	(Belgium) Circuit Zolder	September 14–15		(Spain) Antonio Albacete	(Spain) Antonio Albacete	(Germany) Truck Sport Lutz Bernau	(United Kingdom) Jamie Anderson
7	R1	(France) Bugatti Circuit	September 27–29	(Germany) Jochen Hahn	(Germany) Jochen Hahn	(Germany) Jochen Hahn	(Germany) Team Hahn Racing	(Spain) Luis Recuenco
7	R2	(France) Bugatti Circuit	September 27–29		(Germany) André Kursim	(Germany) André Kursim	(Germany) Don't Touch Racing	(United Kingdom) Jamie Anderson
7	R3	(France) Bugatti Circuit	September 27–29	(Czech Republic) Adam Lacko	(Spain) Antonio Albacete	(Czech Republic) Adam Lacko	(Czech Republic) Buggyra Racing	(United Kingdom) Oliver Janes
7	R4	(France) Bugatti Circuit	September 27–29		(Germany) Sascha Lenz	(Germany) Sascha Lenz	(Germany) SL Trucksport	(United Kingdom) Jamie Anderson
8	R1	(Spain) Circuito del Jarama	October 5–6	(Germany) Jochen Hahn	(Spain) Antonio Albacete	(Germany) Jochen Hahn	(Germany) Team Hahn Racing	(United Kingdom) Jamie Anderson
8	R2	(Spain) Circuito del Jarama	October 5–6		(Hungary) Norbert Kiss	(Hungary) Norbert Kiss	(Germany) Tankpool 24 Racing	(United Kingdom) Oliver Janes
8	R3	(Spain) Circuito del Jarama	October 5–6	(Czech Republic) Adam Lacko	(Czech Republic) Adam Lacko	(Czech Republic) Adam Lacko	(Czech Republic) Buggyra Racing	(Germany) Fabio Citignola
8	R4	(Spain) Circuito del Jarama	October 5–6		(Germany) Jochen Hahn	(Hungary) Norbert Kiss	(Germany) Tankpool 24 Racing	(Netherlands) Erwin Kleinnagelvoort

== Championship standings ==
=== Drivers championship ===
Each round or racing event consists of four races. At each race, points are awarded to the top ten classified finishers using the following structure:

Position	**1st**	**2nd**	**3rd**	**4th**	**5th**	**6th**	**7th**	**8th**	**9th**	**10th**
Points (races 1 and 3)	20	15	12	10	8	6	4	3	2	1
Points (races 2 and 4)	10	9	8	7	6	5	4	3	2	1

Pos.	Driver	MIS (Italy)				HUN (Hungary)				SVK (Slovakia)				NUR (Germany)				MOS^{1} (Czech Republic)				ZOL (Belgium)				LMS (France)				JAR (Spain)				Pts.
1	(Germany) Jochen Hahn	**1**	11	3	1	**1**	6	**1**	4	**1**	5	**1**	7	**1**	3	**1**	6	**1**	4	**C**	C	**1**	6	**1**	8	**1**	6	3	2	**1**	3	2	2	370
2	(Spain) Antonio Albacete	3	2	5	6	2	7	4	3	Ret	8	7	1	2	7	2	3	4	2	C	C	2	4	6	1	3	5	2	6	2	2	3	4	268
3	(Czech Republic) Adam Lacko	2	4	2	4	DSQ	8	6	Ret	3	3	4	4	6	1	3	7	2	3	C	C	3	5	2	Ret	4	3	**1**	5	5	6	**1**	5	261
4	(Germany) Stephanie Halm	5	3	9	5	5	3	2	5	2	2	3	5	Ret	5	15	Ret	3	6	C	C	6	2	4	5	5	2	6	3	4	12	6	3	212
5	(Germany) Sascha Lenz	6	8	6	2	7	1	16	7	4	1	8	3	4	2	4	8	18	5	C	C	17	8	16	6	2	7	4	1	3	4	4	6	192
6	(Hungary) Norbert Kiss	4	7	**1**	Ret	6	5	3	6	5	4	5	2	3	Ret	7	1	14	11	C	C	5	3	3	4	DSQ	DNS	Ret	Ret	6	1	5	1	190
7	(Germany) René Reinert	7	1	4	7	8	2	5	2	8	Ret	2	6	Ret	8	6	5	6	1	C	C	7	1	7	3	Ret	DNS	10	Ret	8	9	8	Ret	146
8	(Germany) André Kursim	11	6	11	Ret	4	4	7	1	DNS	7	6	Ret	Ret	9	8	2	7	8	C	C	4	7	5	2	6	1	5	4	11	8	9	7	138
9	(Portugal) José Rodrigues	15	13	8	8	3	14	9	9					7	4	9	9	5	7	C	C	12	9	Ret	Ret	7	9	15	11	7	5	14	8	70
10	(United Kingdom) Jamie Anderson	13	Ret	12	9	Ret	13	8	8	Ret	6	9	8	10	10	Ret	12	9	Ret	C	C	11	12	8	7	13	8	8	7	9	DNS	11	14	42
11	(United Kingdom) Oliver Janes	9	9	10	10	9	11	12	10	7	12	10	10	15	16	11	Ret	13	12	C	C	10	10	9	11	11	10	7	8	12	10	Ret	11	30
12	(Germany) Gerd Körber													5	6	5	4																	28
13	(France) Anthony Janiec	Ret	10	7	3									8	Ret	12	10	12	9	C	C									10	7	Ret	9	26
14	(Spain) Luis Recuenco	8	5	16	14	10	10	13	11	6	10	11	9	13	11	13	16	10	17	C	C	13	14	12	Ret	9	Ret	12	9	14	Ret	12	15	25
15	(United Kingdom) Terry Gibbon					11	9	10	Ret					11	13	Ret	14	8	10	C	C	8	13	10	10	14	11	16	12	13	Ret	10	Ret	14
16	(United Kingdom) Shane Brereton													12	Ret	WD										8	4	11	14					10
17	(Germany) Fabio Citignola	16	14	14	11	12	12	11	13	9	9	12	DNS	Ret	Ret	16	11	16	14	C	C	16	DNS	13	DNS	15	13	9	13	DNS	Ret	7	13	10
18	(France) Thomas Robineau	10	Ret	13	13									9	14	10	15																	4
19	(Netherlands) Erwin Kleinnagelvoort													18	15	18	19	17	16	C	C	14	Ret	11	12	10	12	13	Ret	15	13	15	10	2
20	(Portugal) José Eduardo Rodrigues	12	12	15	12									16	17	17	17					15	11	14	13	12	14	14	10	16	11	13	12	1
21	(Portugal) Eduardo Rodrigues					13	15	14	12	10	11	13	11					15	15	C	C													1
22	(France) Dominique Orsini	14	15	17	DNS	14	16	15	14	11	13	WD						Ret	Ret	C	C	DSQ	Ret	15	Ret	Ret	DNS	17	DNS	17	14	16	DNS	0
23	(Finland) Mika Mäkinen																	11	13	C	C													0
24	(France) Tèo Calvet													14	12	14	13																	0
25	(Czech Republic) Frankie Vojtíšek													17	21	DNS	18																	0
26	(Germany) Heinrich-Clemens Hecker													19	18	19	21																	0
27	(France) Franck Conti													20	19	20	Ret																	0
28	(France) Jennifer Janiec													21	20	21	20																	0
Drivers ineligible to score points
–	(United Kingdom) David Jenkins																					9	15	Ret	9									–
Pos.	Driver	MIS (Italy)				HUN (Hungary)				SVK (Slovakia)				NUR (Germany)				MOS^{1} (Czech Republic)				ZOL (Belgium)				LMS (France)				JAR (Spain)				Pts.

Colour	Result
Gold	Winner
Silver	Second place
Bronze	Third place
Green	Points classification
Blue	Non-points classification
Blue	Non-classified finish (NC)
Purple	Retired, not classified (Ret)
Red	Did not qualify (DNQ)
Red	Did not pre-qualify (DNPQ)
Black	Disqualified (DSQ)
White	Did not start (DNS)
White	Withdrew (WD)
White	Race cancelled (C)
Blank	Did not practice (DNP)
Blank	Did not arrive (DNA)
Blank	Excluded (EX)

**Bold** – Pole
Italics – Fastest Lap

Notes

^{1} Races 3 and 4 at Autodrom Most cancelled due to heavy rain.

=== Grammer Truck Cup ===
Pos.	Driver	MIS (Italy)				HUN (Hungary)				SVK (Slovakia)				NUR (Germany)				MOS^{1} (Czech Republic)				ZOL (Belgium)				LMS (France)				JAR (Spain)				Pts.
1	(United Kingdom) Oliver Janes	2	2	1	2	1	3	4	2	2	5	2	3	6	7	2	Ret	4	2	C	C	3	1	2	4	3	2	1	2	2	1	Ret	2	320
2	(United Kingdom) Jamie Anderson	5	Ret	2	1	Ret	5	1	1	Ret	1	1	1	2	1	Ret	2	2	Ret	C	C	4	3	1	1	5	1	2	1	1	DNS	3	5	289
3	(Spain) Luis Recuenco	1	1	6	6	2	2	5	3	1	3	3	2	4	2	3	6	3	6	C	C	5	5	5	Ret	1	Ret	4	3	4	Ret	4	6	270
4	(United Kingdom) Terry Gibbon					3	1	2	Ret					3	4	Ret	4	1	1	C	C	1	4	3	3	6	3	7	5	3	Ret	2	Ret	192
5	(Germany) Fabio Citignola	7	4	4	3	4	4	3	5	3	2	4	DNS	Ret	Ret	5	1	6	3	C	C	8	DNS	6	DNS	7	5	3	6	DNS	Ret	1	4	191
6	(Portugal) José Eduardo Rodrigues	4	3	5	4									7	8	6	7					7	2	7	6	4	6	6	4	6	2	5	3	134
7	(Netherlands) Erwin Kleinnagelvoort													9	6	7	9	7	5	C	C	6	Ret	4	5	2	4	5	Ret	5	3	6	1	110
8	(France) Thomas Robineau	3	Ret	3	5									1	5	1	5																	83
9	(Portugal) Eduardo Rodrigues					5	6	6	4	4	4	5	4					5	4	C	C													73
10	(France) Dominique Orsini	6	5	7	DNS	5	7	7	6	5	6	WD						Ret	Ret	C	C	DSQ	Ret	8	Ret	Ret	DNS	8	DNS	7	4	7	DNS	69
11	(France) Tèo Calvet													5	3	4	3																	34
12	(Czech Republic) Frankie Vojtíšek													8	12	DNS	8																	6
13	(Germany) Heinrich-Clemens Hecker													10	9	8	11																	6
14	(France) Franck Conti													11	10	9	Ret																	3
15	(France) Jennifer Janiec													12	11	10	10																	2
Drivers ineligible to score points
–	(United Kingdom) David Jenkins																					2	6	Ret	2									–

^{1} Races 3 and 4 at Autodrom Most were cancelled due to heavy rain.

== Bibliography ==
- Göttl, Thomas Paul; Trost, Oliver (2019). Truck Sport Book 2019 (in English and German). Stuttgart: Motorbuch Verlag. ISBN 978-3-613-30918-0.
