= European Truck Racing Championship =

Motorsport truck road racing series

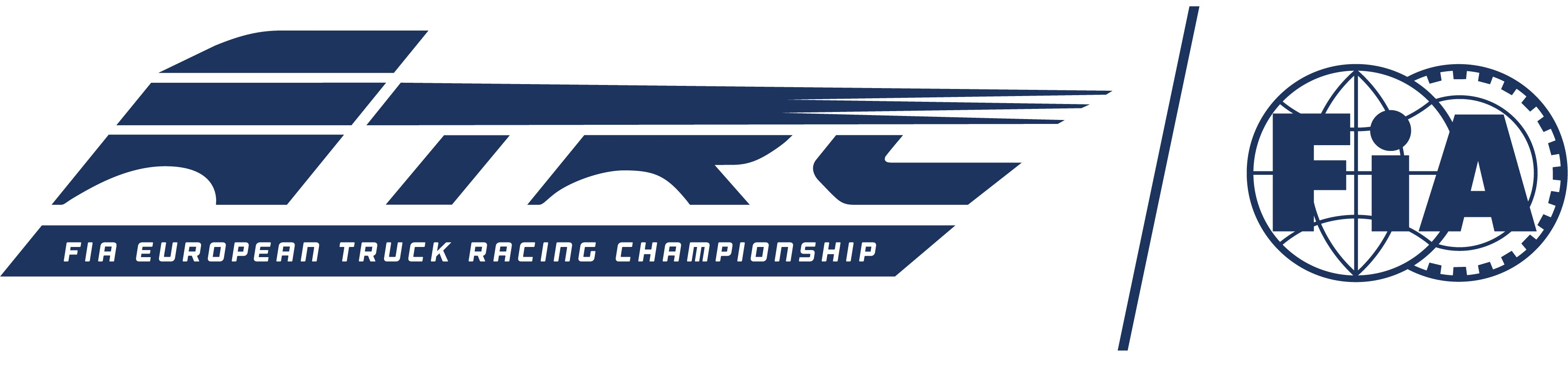
- Country: Europe
- Inaugural season: 1985; 2006 (current format)
- Drivers: 17 (2026)
- Teams: 16 (2026)
- Drivers' champion: (Hungary) Norbert Kiss
- Official website: fiaetrc.com

The FIA European Truck Racing Championship is a motorsport truck road racing series for semi-tractors which is sanctioned to the Fédération Internationale de l'Automobile and is organised by ETRA Promotion GmbH.

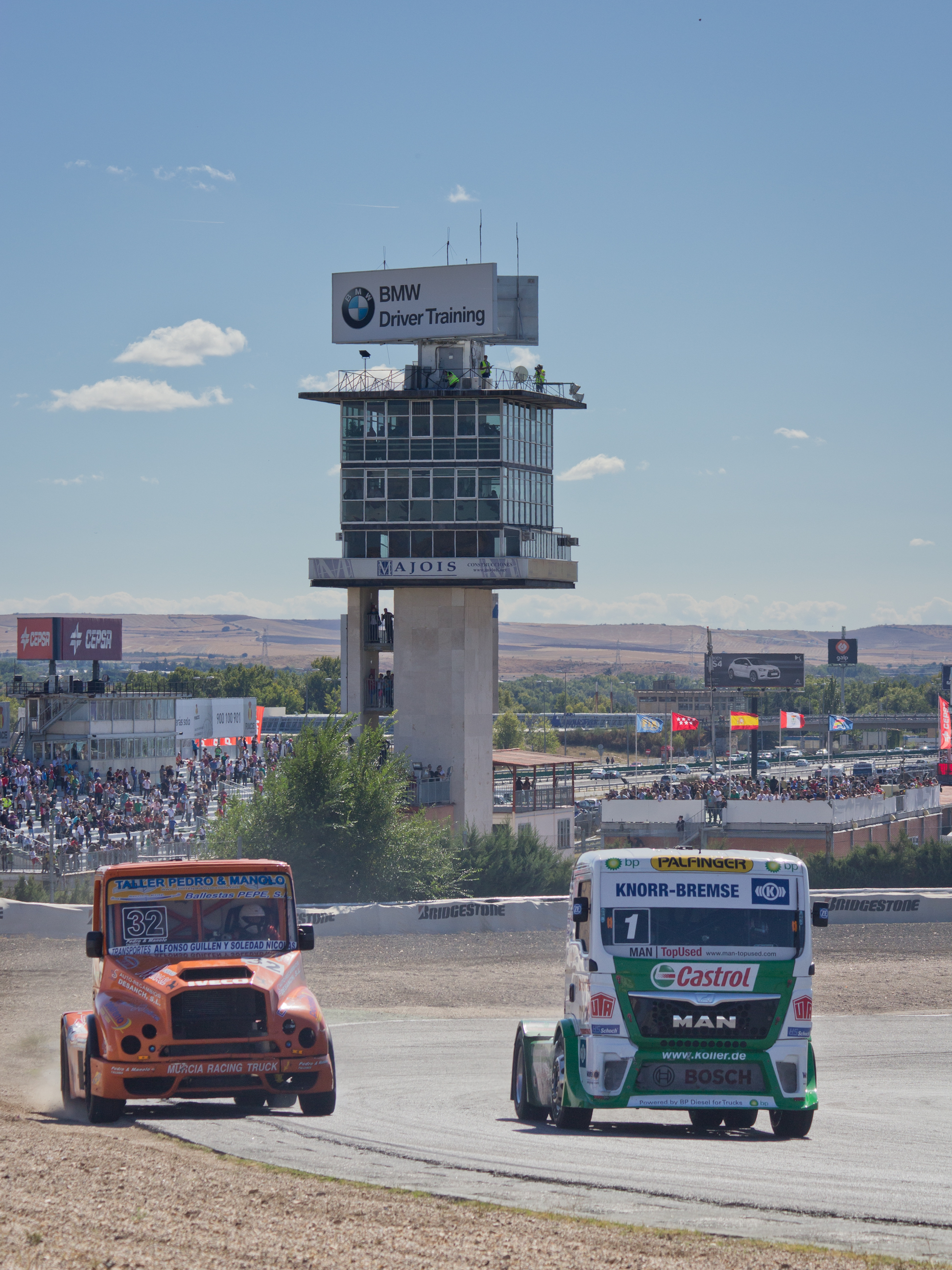
Pedro Ignacio García Marco and Jochen Hahn on the Circuito del Jarama in 2013.

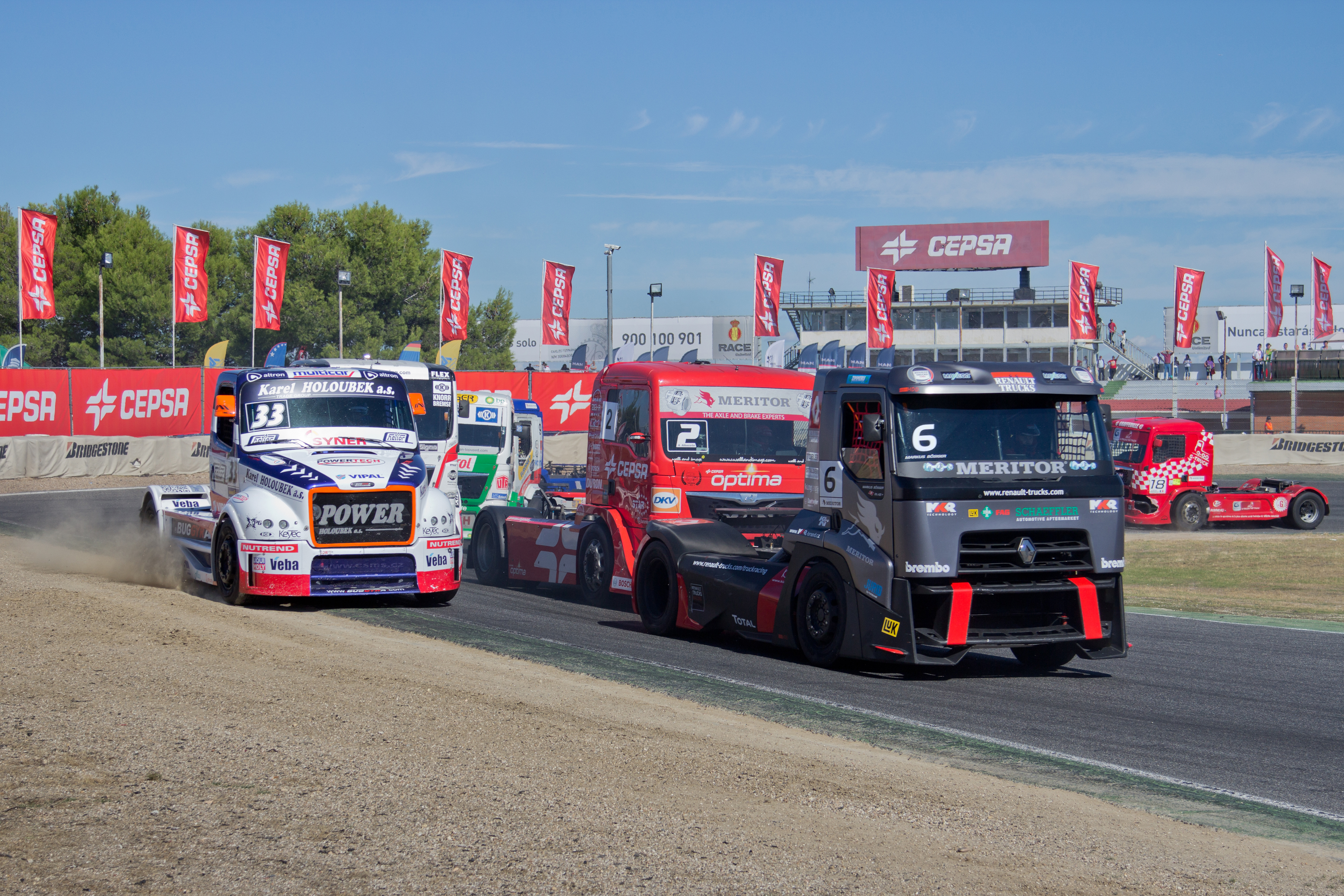
Spain Grand Prix 2013

== Champions ==
Drivers in bold have competed in the 2026 European Truck Racing Championship.

Drivers by number of European Truck Drivers' Championships won
Driver	Titles	Season(s)
(Hungary) **Norbert Kiss**	8	2014, 2015, 2021, 2022, 2023, 2024, 2025, 2026
(Germany) **Jochen Hahn**	6	2011, 2012, 2013, 2016, 2018, 2019
(United Kingdom) Rod Chapman	3	1985, 1987, 1989
(United Kingdom) Richard Walker	2	1991, 1992
(France) Gérard Cuynet	2	1988, 1993
(United Kingdom) Steve Parrish	2	1994, 1996
(Finland) Harri Luostarinen	2	1997, 2000
(Germany) Fritz Kreutzpointner	2	1999, 2001
(Germany) Gerd Körber	2	2002, 2003
(Czech Republic) David Vrsecky	2	2008, 2009
(Spain) **Antonio Albacete**	2	2006, 2010
(United Kingdom) Mel Lindsay	1	1986
(Germany) Axel Hegmann	1	1990
(Sweden) Slim Borgudd	1	1995
(France) Ludovic Faure	1	1998
(Germany) Markus Oestreich	1	2004
(Germany) Ralf Druckenmüller	1	2005
(Switzerland) Markus Bösiger	1	2007
(Czech Republic) **Adam Lacko**	1	2017
19 drivers		37 titles

=== 1985–1993 ===
Season	Class A		Class B		Class C	
1985	(United Kingdom) Rod Chapman	Ford Cargo	(United Kingdom) Richard Walker	Leyland	(France) Yves Barrat	Renault
1986	(United Kingdom) Mel Lindsay	Leyland Roadtrain	(Sweden) Slim Borgudd	Volvo White	(Sweden) Curt Göransson	Volvo N12
1987	(United Kingdom) Rod Chapman	Ford Cargo	(United Kingdom) George Allen	Volvo White	(Sweden) Slim Borgudd	Volvo White
1988	(France) Gérard Cuynet	Ford Cargo	(Sweden) Curt Göransson	Volvo N12	(Sweden) Rolf Björk	Scania T143M
1989	(United Kingdom) Rod Chapman	Volvo N12	(Sweden) Curt Göransson	Volvo N12	(West Germany) Thomas Hegmann	Mercedes-Benz 1450-S
1990	(Germany) Axel Hegmann	Mercedes-Benz	(Sweden) Curt Göransson	Volvo N12	(United Kingdom) Steve Parrish	Mercedes-Benz 1450
1991	(United Kingdom) Richard Walker	Volvo White Aero	(Finland) Jokke Kallio	Sisu SR 340	(Germany) Gerd Körber	Phoenix MAN
1992	(United Kingdom) Richard Walker	Volvo White Aero	(Finland) Jokke Kallio	Sisu SR 340	(United Kingdom) Steve Parrish	Mercedes-Benz 1450-S
1993	(France) Gérard Cuynet	Mercedes-Benz 1733-S	(Finland) Harri Luostarinen	Sisu SR 340 Revolution	(United Kingdom) Steve Parrish	Mercedes-Benz 1450-S

=== 1994–2005 (FIA European Cups) ===
Season	Super-Race-Trucks		Race-Trucks	
1994	(United Kingdom) Steve Parrish	Mercedes-Benz 1834-S	(Sweden) Boije Ovebrink	Volvo NL12
1995	(Sweden) Slim Borgudd	Mercedes-Benz 1834-S	(Czech Republic) Martin Koloc	Sisu SR 340
1996	(United Kingdom) Steve Parrish	Mercedes-Benz 1834-S	(Czech Republic) Martin Koloc	Sisu SR 340
1997	(Finland) Harri Luostarinen	Caterpillar TRD	(Germany) Heinz-Werner Lenz	Mercedes-Benz 1938-S
1998	(France) Ludovic Faure	Mercedes-Benz Atego Renntruck	(Germany) Heinz-Werner Lenz	Mercedes-Benz 1938-S
1999	(Germany) Fritz Kreutzpointner	MAN 18.423 FT	(Germany) Heinz-Werner Lenz	Mercedes-Benz 1938-S
2000	(Finland) Harri Luostarinen	Caterpillar TRD	(France) Noël Crozier	MAN 19.414
2001	(Germany) Fritz Kreutzpointner	MAN TR 1400	(Germany) Lutz Bernau	MAN 19.414
2002	(Germany) Gerd Körber	Buggyra MK 002	(Austria) Egon Allgäuer	MAN TGA
2003	(Germany) Gerd Körber	Buggyra MK 002/B	(Germany) Lutz Bernau	MAN TGA
2004	(Germany) Markus Oestreich	VW Titan	(United Kingdom) Stuart Oliver	MAN TGA
2005	(Germany) Ralf Druckenmüller	VW Titan	(Spain) Antonio Albacete	MAN TGA

Year	Super-Race-Trucks B	
2001	(Czech Republic) Stan Matějovský	Tatra

=== 2006–current (FIA European Championships) ===
European Drivers' Champions by season
Season	Driver	Truck	Tyres	Poles	Wins	Podiums	Points	% Points	Margin							
Season	Driver	Truck	Tyres	Poles	Wins	Podiums	Points	% Points	Margin	2006	(Spain) Antonio Albacete	MAN TGA	**G**	346	64.074	28
2007	(Switzerland) Markus Bösiger	Buggyra	**G**				378	70.000	1							
2008	(Czech Republic) David Vrsecky	Buggyra	**G**				414	76.666	21							
2009	(Czech Republic) David Vrsecky	Buggyra	**G**				490	81.666	23							
2010	(Spain) Antonio Albacete	MAN TGS	**G**				387	73.018	52							
2011	(Germany) Jochen Hahn	MAN TG	**G**	7	12	22	402	67.000	47							
2012	(Germany) Jochen Hahn	MAN TG	**G**	12	16	30	517	78.333	49							
2013	(Germany) Jochen Hahn	MAN TGS	**G**	3	6		417	69.500	5							
2014	(Hungary) Norbert Kiss	MAN	**G**	10	9		401	74.259	18							
2015	(Hungary) Norbert Kiss	MAN	**G**	17	19	32	599	74.875	152							
2016	(Germany) Jochen Hahn	MAN TGS	**G**	8	14	30	462	85.555	55							
2017	(Czech Republic) Adam Lacko	Buggyra	**G**	5	12	19	381	71.886	38							
2018	(Germany) Jochen Hahn	Iveco Stralis	**G**	8	12	20	387	80.625	121							
2019	(Germany) Jochen Hahn	Iveco Stralis	**G**	13	13	20	370	82.222	102							
2020	Not awarded due to COVID-19 pandemic															
2021	(Hungary) Norbert Kiss	MAN	**G**	9	11	15	276	78.857	49							
2022	(Hungary) Norbert Kiss	MAN	**G**	15	16	22	410	85.416	115							
2023	(Hungary) Norbert Kiss	MAN	**G**	16	22	26	419	87.291	105							
2024	(Hungary) Norbert Kiss	MAN	**G**	14	19	24	397	94.524	98							
2025	(Hungary) Norbert Kiss	MAN	**G**	14	19	24	419	91.087	94							

==== Goodyear Truck Cup ====
From 2017, the series began running the Goodyear Truck Cup within the regular drivers' championship. The competition is reserved for drivers given a "Chrome" rating by the sanctioning body; drivers are considered "Chrome" unless their past performance merits the rank of "Titan".^{1}

Season	Driver	Truck
2017	(Portugal) José Rodrigues	MAN
2018	(United Kingdom) Shane Brereton	MAN
2019	(United Kingdom) Oliver Janes	Freightliner
2020	Not awarded due to COVID-19 pandemic	
2021	(United Kingdom) Shane Brereton	MAN
2022	(France) Téo Calvet	Freightliner
2023	(Portugal) José Eduardo Rodrigues	MAN
2024	(Portugal) José Eduardo Rodrigues	MAN
2025	(United Kingdom) Mark Taylor	MAN

== Notes ==
^{1} Titan rank is awarded to drivers who have either A) won the ETRC championship within the previous 10 years, B) finished in the top 10 in the championship standings the previous season, C) has finished 6th or better in any super pole session in the previous season, D) is ranked gold or platinum in the FIA's driver ranking system or E) is judged to have had outstanding performance even if none of the previous conditions were met.
