= 2016 European Truck Racing Championship =

Seasons
- ← 2015 2017 →

The 2016 FIA European Truck Racing Championship is a motor-racing championship using highly tuned tractor units. It was the 32nd year of the championship. Jochen Hahn won the championship with MAN.

== Teams and drivers ==
Team	Manufacturer	No.	Drivers	Rounds
(Czech Republic) Buggyra International Racing System	Freightliner	55	(Czech Republic) Adam Lacko	1-9
(Czech Republic) Buggyra International Racing System	Freightliner	86	(Czech Republic) Jiri Forman	1-9
(Czech Republic) Czech Truck Racing Team	MAN	12	(Czech Republic) Frankie Vojtisek	1-2,4-5,7-9
(Netherlands) EK Truck Race	Scania	15	(Netherlands) Erwin Kleinnagelvoort	1,3-9
(Finland) J. Hemming Racing Team	Mercedes-Benz	87	(Finland) John Hemming	4,7-9
(France) Lion Truck Racing	MAN	8	(France) Anthony Janiec	1-9
(France) Lion Truck Racing	MAN	20	(France) Jean-Claude Labadie	2,4
(Hungary) OXXO Energy Truck Race Team	MAN	88	(United Kingdom) Ryan Smith	1,4-7
(Portugal) Reboconort Racing Truck Team	MAN	11	(Portugal) Eduardo Rodrigues	1-4,7-9
(Germany) Reinert Racing GmbH	MAN	44	(Germany) Stephanie Halm	2-9
(Germany) Reinert Racing GmbH	MAN	77	(Germany) René Reinert	1-9
S.L Racing Team Germany	MAN	30	(Germany) Sascha Lenz	1-9
(Germany) Team Hahn Racing	MAN	3	(Germany) Jochen Hahn	1-9
(United Kingdom) Team Oliver Racing	MAN	17	(United Kingdom) Shane Brereton	4-6,9
(France) Team Orsini Racing	Mercedes-Benz	19	(France) Dominique Orsini	2,5-6
(France) Team Robineau	MAN	21	(France) Jeremy Robineau	2,4
(France) Team Robineau	MAN	21	(France) Thomas Robineau	1,7
(Germany) Team Schwabentruck	Iveco	27	(Germany) Gerd Korber	1-2,4-7,9
(Germany) Team Schwabentruck	Iveco	28	(Austria) Markus Altenstrasser	1,4
(Germany) Team Tankpool 24 Racing	Mercedes-Benz	1	(Hungary) Norbert Kiss	1-9
(Germany) Team Tankpool 24 Racing	Mercedes-Benz	24	(Germany) Andre Kursim	2,4-9
(Germany) Truck Sport Lutz Bernau	MAN	10	(Germany) Ellen Lohr	1-9

== Calendar and winners ==
Round		Circuit	Date	Pole position	Fastest lap	Winning driver	Winning team
1	R1	(Austria) Red Bull Ring	30 April–1 May	(Germany) Jochen Hahn	(Germany) Jochen Hahn	(Germany) Jochen Hahn	(Germany) Team Hahn Racing
1	R2	(Austria) Red Bull Ring	30 April–1 May		(Germany) Jochen Hahn	(Germany) René Reinert	(Germany) Reinert Racing GmbH
1	R3	(Austria) Red Bull Ring	30 April–1 May	(Czech Republic) Adam Lacko	(Czech Republic) Adam Lacko	(Czech Republic) Adam Lacko	(Czech Republic) Buggyra International Racing System
1	R4	(Austria) Red Bull Ring	30 April–1 May		(Czech Republic) Adam Lacko	(Czech Republic) Adam Lacko	(Czech Republic) Buggyra International Racing System
2	R1	(Italy) Misano World Circuit	28-29 May	(Czech Republic) Adam Lacko	(Czech Republic) Adam Lacko	(Czech Republic) Adam Lacko	(Czech Republic) Buggyra International Racing System
2	R2	(Italy) Misano World Circuit	28-29 May		(Czech Republic) Adam Lacko	(Czech Republic) Adam Lacko	(Czech Republic) Buggyra International Racing System
2	R3	(Italy) Misano World Circuit	28-29 May	(Czech Republic) Adam Lacko	(Germany) Jochen Hahn	(Czech Republic) Adam Lacko	(Czech Republic) Buggyra International Racing System
2	R4	(Italy) Misano World Circuit	28-29 May		(Germany) Stephanie Halm	(Germany) Jochen Hahn	(Germany) Team Hahn Racing
3	R1	(France) Circuit Paul Armagnac	10-12 June	(Hungary) Norbert Kiss	(Hungary) Norbert Kiss	(Hungary) Norbert Kiss	(Germany) Team Tankpool 24 Racing
3	R2	(France) Circuit Paul Armagnac	10-12 June		(Germany) Jochen Hahn	(Germany) René Reinert	(Germany) Reinert Racing GmbH
3	R3	(France) Circuit Paul Armagnac	10-12 June	(Czech Republic) Adam Lacko	(Germany) Jochen Hahn	(Germany) Jochen Hahn	(Germany) Team Hahn Racing
3	R4	(France) Circuit Paul Armagnac	10-12 June		(Germany) Jochen Hahn	(Czech Republic) Adam Lacko	(Czech Republic) Buggyra International Racing System
4	R1	(Germany) Nürburgring	1-3 July	(Germany) Jochen Hahn	(Germany) Jochen Hahn	(Germany) Jochen Hahn	(Germany) Team Hahn Racing
4	R2	(Germany) Nürburgring	1-3 July		(Germany) Jochen Hahn	(Germany) Stephanie Halm	(Germany) Reinert Racing GmbH
4	R3	(Germany) Nürburgring	1-3 July	(Germany) Jochen Hahn	(Czech Republic) Adam Lacko	(Czech Republic) Adam Lacko	(Czech Republic) Buggyra International Racing System
4	R4	(Germany) Nürburgring	1-3 July		(Czech Republic) Adam Lacko	(Czech Republic) Adam Lacko	(Czech Republic) Buggyra International Racing System
5	R1	(Hungary) Hungaroring	27-28 August	(Germany) Jochen Hahn	(United Kingdom) Ryan Smith	(Germany) Jochen Hahn	(Germany) Team Hahn Racing
5	R2	(Hungary) Hungaroring	27-28 August		(United Kingdom) Ryan Smith	(Germany) Stephanie Halm	(Germany) Reinert Racing GmbH
5	R3	(Hungary) Hungaroring	27-28 August	(Hungary) Norbert Kiss	(Germany) Jochen Hahn	(Germany) Jochen Hahn	(Germany) Team Hahn Racing
5	R4	(Hungary) Hungaroring	27-28 August		(Germany) Jochen Hahn	(Czech Republic) Adam Lacko	(Czech Republic) Buggyra International Racing System
6	R1	(Czech Republic) Autodrom Most	3-4 September	(Germany) Jochen Hahn	(Czech Republic) Adam Lacko	(Czech Republic) Adam Lacko	(Czech Republic) Buggyra International Racing System
6	R2	(Czech Republic) Autodrom Most	3-4 September		(Germany) Jochen Hahn	(United Kingdom) Ryan Smith	(Hungary) OXXO Energy Truck Race Team
6	R3	(Czech Republic) Autodrom Most	3-4 September	(Germany) Jochen Hahn	(Germany) Jochen Hahn	(Germany) Jochen Hahn	(Germany) Team Hahn Racing
6	R4	(Czech Republic) Autodrom Most	3-4 September		(Czech Republic) Adam Lacko	(Germany) Jochen Hahn	(Germany) Team Hahn Racing
7	R1	(Belgium) Circuit Zolder	17-18 September	(Czech Republic) Adam Lacko	(Germany) Jochen Hahn	(Germany) Jochen Hahn	(Germany) Team Hahn Racing
7	R2	(Belgium) Circuit Zolder	17-18 September		(Czech Republic) Adam Lacko	(Czech Republic) Adam Lacko	(Czech Republic) Buggyra International Racing System
7	R3	(Belgium) Circuit Zolder	17-18 September	(Czech Republic) Adam Lacko	(Czech Republic) Adam Lacko	(Germany) Jochen Hahn	(Germany) Team Hahn Racing
7	R4	(Belgium) Circuit Zolder	17-18 September		(Czech Republic) Adam Lacko	(Czech Republic) Adam Lacko	(Czech Republic) Buggyra International Racing System
8	R1	(Spain) Circuito del Jarama	1-2 October	(Czech Republic) Adam Lacko	(Germany) Jochen Hahn	(Czech Republic) Adam Lacko	(Czech Republic) Buggyra International Racing System
8	R2	(Spain) Circuito del Jarama	1-2 October		(Germany) Jochen Hahn	(Germany) Jochen Hahn	(Germany) Team Hahn Racing
8	R3	(Spain) Circuito del Jarama	1-2 October	(Germany) Jochen Hahn	(Germany) Jochen Hahn	(Germany) Jochen Hahn	(Germany) Team Hahn Racing
8	R4	(Spain) Circuito del Jarama	1-2 October		(Germany) Jochen Hahn	(France) Anthony Janiec	(France) Lion Truck Racing
9	R1	(France) Bugatti Circuit	8-9 October	(Germany) Jochen Hahn	(Germany) Jochen Hahn	(Germany) Jochen Hahn	(Germany) Team Hahn Racing
9	R2	(France) Bugatti Circuit	8-9 October		(Germany) René Reinert	(Germany) Stephanie Halm	(Germany) Reinert Racing GmbH
9	R3	(France) Bugatti Circuit	8-9 October	(Czech Republic) Adam Lacko	(Germany) Jochen Hahn	(Germany) Jochen Hahn	(Germany) Team Hahn Racing
9	R4	(France) Bugatti Circuit	8-9 October		(Germany) Gerd Körber	(Germany) Stephanie Halm	(Germany) Reinert Racing GmbH

== Championship overall standings ==
=== Drivers' championship ===
Each round or racing event consisted of four races. At each race, points were awarded to the top ten classified finishers using the following structure:

Position	**1st**	**2nd**	**3rd**	**4th**	**5th**	**6th**	**7th**	**8th**	**9th**	**10th**
Points (races 1 and 3)	20	15	12	10	8	6	4	3	2	1
Points (races 2 and 4)	10	9	8	7	6	5	4	3	2	1

Pos.	Driver	RBR (Austria)				MIS (Italy)				NOG (France)				NUR (Germany)				HUN (Hungary)				MOS (Czech Republic)				ZOL (Belgium)				JAR (Spain)				LMS (France)				Pts.
1	(Germany) Jochen Hahn	**1**	2	3	4	3	2	2	1	3	2	1	2	**1**	2	**2**	2	**1**	6	1	5	**2**	5	**1**	1	1	3	1	2	2	1	**1**	4	**1**	3	1	5	462
2	(Czech Republic) Adam Lacko	6	5	**1**	1	**1**	1	**1**	5	2	3	**2**	1	2	4	1	1	5	4	3	1	1	4	2	2	**2**	1	**13**	1	**1**	2	2	3	3	Ret	**2**	4	407
3	(Germany) René Reinert	2	1	5	12	2	Ret	6	4	5	1	3	Ret	5	6	5	5	DNS	Ret	DNS	DNS	5	2	3	6	Ret	4	2	5	3	5	3	2	4	2	3	3	260
4	(Germany) Stephanie Halm					4	3	5	2	11	7	4	6	3	1	6	3	7	1	Ret	11	3	3	5	7	3	5	3	3	6	3	4	5	5	1	5	1	239
5	(Hungary) Norbert Kiss	8	Ret	6	6	8	4	3	11	**1**	6	Ret	Ret	4	3	3	4	2	3	**2**	3	10	6	6	4	6	Ret	4	Ret	9	7	5	Ret	2	4	Ret	Ret	216
6	(France) Anthony Janiec	11	8	2	9	5	11	4	3	4	5	5	5	6	5	7	8	4	2	9	2	4	11	Ret	5	4	6	6	4	4	6	6	1	6	DSQ	Ret	DSQ	196
7	(Germany) Sascha Lenz	4	4	14	13	11	7	8	6	6	8	7	7	8	19	16	Ret	Ret	Ret	5	6	8	12	7	3	7	2	7	6	5	8	7	6	8	Ret	Ret	7	128
8	(Germany) Gerd Körber	5	9	4	3	9	5	7	7					7	12	4	6	6	14	8	8	15	Ret	4	Ret	5	8	5	Ret					Ret	7	4	6	123
9	(Germany) Ellen Lohr	9	Ret	11	10	6	8	11	10	7	4	6	8	10	9	9	9	Ret	11	4	12	9	8	13	8	10	9	9	8	7	4	8	7	7	Ret	7	2	102
10	(Czech Republic) Jiri Forman	DSQ	7	7	5	10	9	13	12	10	9	9	3	15	15	8	11	Ret	7	7	4	6	7	8	12	8	7	12	11	8	10	13	10	9	5	6	8	93
11	(United Kingdom) Ryan Smith	10	Ret	8	2									11	8	14	7	3	5	6	9	7	1	9	Ret													64
12	(Austria) Markus Altenstrasser	3	3	10	11									9	7	11	12																					27
13	(Czech Republic) Frankie Vojtisek	13	6	9	7	Ret	10	10	8					12	10	12	13	8	13	DNS	DNS					Ret	Ret	DNS	DNS	Ret	Ret	Ret	8	11	Ret	9	9	27
14	(Germany) André Kursim					14	13	12	13					Ret	16	18	16	9	8	11	7	11	9	11	9	11	10	8	7	16	9	9	9	Ret	Ret	DNS	DNS	27
15	(Netherlands) Erwin Kleinnagelvoort	12	11	12	8					9	10	10	4	14	18	13	18	11	10	10	10	13	10	12	10	13	12	Ret	10	10	11	11	12	13	Ret	DNS	DNS	22
16	(Portugal) Eduardo Rodrigues	Ret	Ret	13	14	13	12	14	14	8	11	8	9	16	20	Ret	14									12	13	10	9	11	13	12	11	14	6	10	11	17
17	(France) Jeremy Robineau					7	6	9	9					Ret	11	19	Ret																					13
18	(United Kingdom) Shane Brereton													13	Ret	10	10	10	9	Ret	DNS	12	Ret	10	11									10	Ret	8	10	11
19	(France) Thomas Robineau	7	10	Ret	15																					9	11	11	DNS									7
20	(France) Dominique Orsini					15	DSQ	15	Ret									12	12	12	13	14	13	14	Ret													0
21	(France) Jean-Claude Labadie					12	DSQ	DNS	DNS					18	14	17	15																					0
22	(Germany) Heinz Werner Lenz													Ret	13	DSQ	Ret																					0
23	(Finland) John Hemming													17	17	15	17									14	14	Ret	DNS	Ret	15	14	Ret	12	Ret	11	12	0
Pos.	Driver	RBR (Austria)				MIS (Italy)				NOG (France)				NUR (Germany)				HUN (Hungary)				MOS (Czech Republic)				ZOL (Belgium)				JAR (Spain)				LMS (France)				Pts.

Colour	Result
Gold	Winner
Silver	Second place
Bronze	Third place
Green	Points classification
Blue	Non-points classification
Blue	Non-classified finish (NC)
Purple	Retired, not classified (Ret)
Red	Did not qualify (DNQ)
Red	Did not pre-qualify (DNPQ)
Black	Disqualified (DSQ)
White	Did not start (DNS)
White	Withdrew (WD)
White	Race cancelled (C)
Blank	Did not practice (DNP)
Blank	Did not arrive (DNA)
Blank	Excluded (EX)

**Bold** – Pole
Italics – Fastest Lap

† – Drivers did not finish the race, but were classified as they completed over 75% of the race distance.

== Bibliography ==
- Göttl, Thomas Paul (2017). Truck Sport Book 2016 (in English and German). Stuttgart: Motorbuch Verlag. ISBN 978-3-613-30851-0.
