= 2025 European Truck Racing Championship =

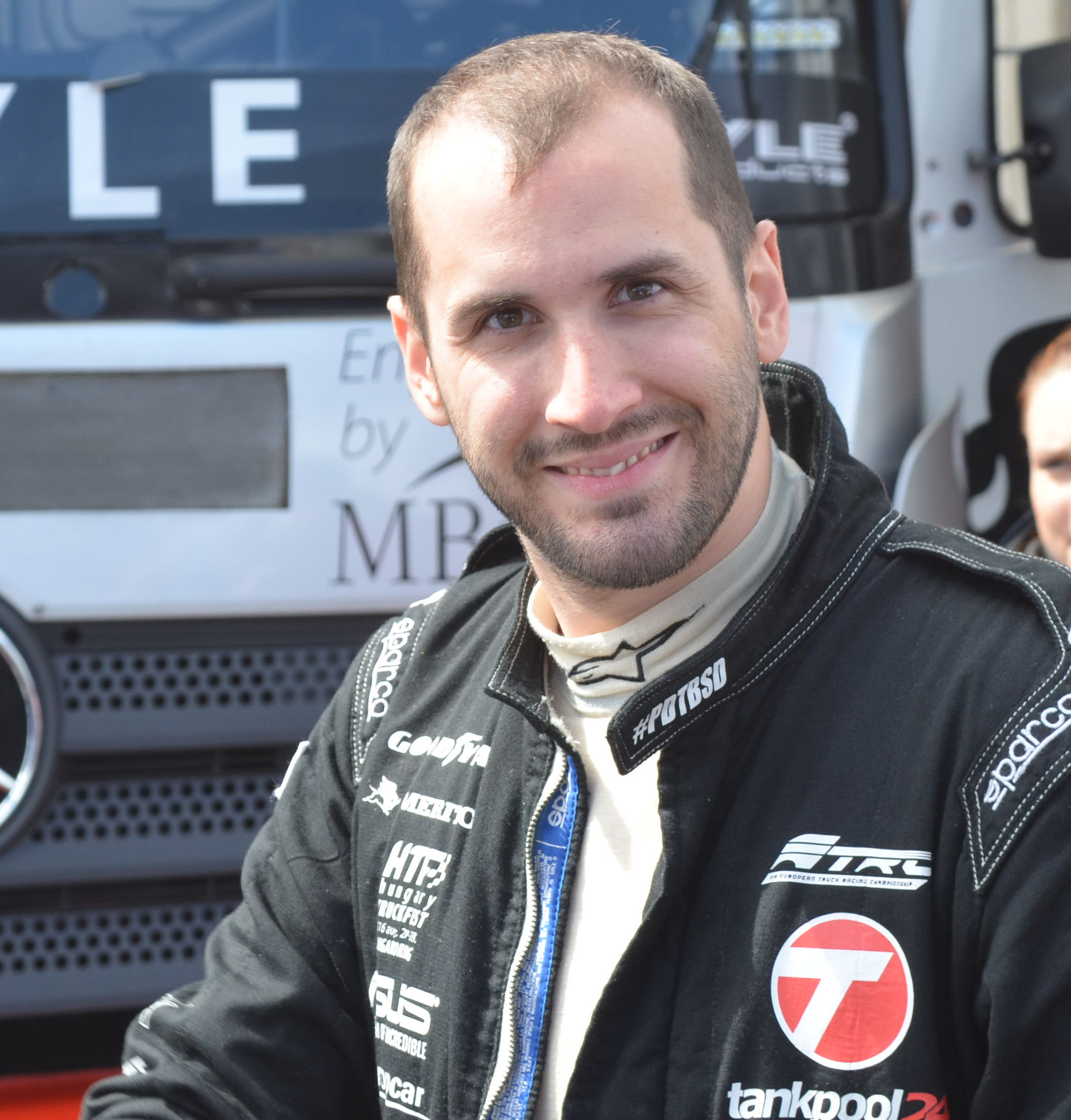
The 2025 Drivers' and Teams' champions are Norbert Kiss and his team Révész Racing - MAN, respectively.

The 2025 European Truck Racing Championship, also known as the Goodyear European Truck Racing Championship for sponsorship reasons, was a motor-racing championship using highly tuned tractor units. It was the 41st year of the championship. It was an eight-round season, beginning on 17 May at the Misano World Circuit Marco Simoncelli and ending on 5 October at the Circuito del Jarama.

== Schedule ==
Round		Circuit	Date
1	R1	(Italy) Misano World Circuit Marco Simoncelli, Misano Adriatico	17 May
1	R2	(Italy) Misano World Circuit Marco Simoncelli, Misano Adriatico	17 May
1	R3	(Italy) Misano World Circuit Marco Simoncelli, Misano Adriatico	18 May
1	R4	(Italy) Misano World Circuit Marco Simoncelli, Misano Adriatico	18 May
2	R1	(Germany) Lausitzring, Klettwitz	24 May
2	R2	(Germany) Lausitzring, Klettwitz	24 May
2	R3	(Germany) Lausitzring, Klettwitz	25 May
2	R4	(Germany) Lausitzring, Klettwitz	25 May
3	R1	Slovakia Ring, Orechová Potôň	7 June
3	R2	Slovakia Ring, Orechová Potôň	7 June
3	R3	Slovakia Ring, Orechová Potôň	8 June
3	R4	Slovakia Ring, Orechová Potôň	8 June
4	R1	(Germany) Nürburgring, Nürburg	12 July
4	R2	(Germany) Nürburgring, Nürburg	12 July
4	R3	(Germany) Nürburgring, Nürburg	13 July
4	R4	(Germany) Nürburgring, Nürburg	13 July
5	R1	(Czech Republic) Autodrom Most, Most	30 August
5	R2	(Czech Republic) Autodrom Most, Most	30 August
5	R3	(Czech Republic) Autodrom Most, Most	31 August
5	R4	(Czech Republic) Autodrom Most, Most	31 August
6	R1	(Belgium) Circuit Zolder, Heusden-Zolder	13 September
6	R2	(Belgium) Circuit Zolder, Heusden-Zolder	13 September
6	R3	(Belgium) Circuit Zolder, Heusden-Zolder	14 September
6	R4	(Belgium) Circuit Zolder, Heusden-Zolder	14 September
7	R1	(France) Bugatti Circuit, Le Mans	20 September
7	R2	(France) Bugatti Circuit, Le Mans	20 September
7	R3	(France) Bugatti Circuit, Le Mans	21 September
7	R4	(France) Bugatti Circuit, Le Mans	21 September
8	R1	(Spain) Circuito del Jarama, San Sebastián de los Reyes	4 October
8	R2	(Spain) Circuito del Jarama, San Sebastián de los Reyes	4 October
8	R3	(Spain) Circuito del Jarama, San Sebastián de los Reyes	5 October
8	R4	(Spain) Circuito del Jarama, San Sebastián de los Reyes	5 October

== Teams and drivers ==
The full season entry list was released on 25 May. Race-by-race entries will be announced throughout the season.

The following table lists all teams and drivers to compete in the 2025 championship.

Team	Manufacturer	No.	Drivers	Rounds	Class
(Germany) Don't Touch Racing	Iveco	11	(United Kingdom) Bradley Smith	All	C
(United Kingdom) Garrett Trucksport	MAN	42	(United Kingdom) Luke Garrett	All	C
(Germany) Hecker Racing	Scania	25	(Germany) Heinrich Clemens-Hecker	All	C
(Germany) Kursch Kurtscheid Racing	MAN	33	(Germany) Stefan Kursch	1, 4, 6–8	C
(France) Lion Truck Racing	MAN	66	(France) Jonathan André	1, 6, 8	C
(Spain) Luis Recuenco	Iveco	64	(Spain) Luis Recuenco	1–7	C
(Czech Republic) MM Technology	Iveco	30	(Czech Republic) Martin Macík	5	C
(United Kingdom) NWT Motorsport	MAN	18	(United Kingdom) John Newell	All	C
(Portugal) Reboconort Racing Truck Team	MAN	38	(Portugal) José Eduardo Rodrigues	All	
(United Kingdom) Reid Trucksport	Iveco	68	(United Kingdom) Craig Reid	7–8	C
(United Kingdom) Reid Trucksport	Iveco	89	(United Kingdom) Simon Reid	7–8	C
(Germany) Reinert Racing	MAN	77	(Germany) René Reinert	All	
(Hungary) Révész Racing	MAN	1	(Hungary) Norbert Kiss	All	
(Germany) Ruppert Motorsport	MAN	29	(Germany) Christian Ruppert	1–5, 7	C
(Germany) SL 30 Trucksport	MAN	3	(Germany) Sascha Lenz	All	
(Germany) T Sport Bernau	MAN	23	(Spain) Antonio Albacete	All	
(Germany) Tankpool 24 Racing	Freightliner	24	(Germany) Steffen Faas	All	C
(United Kingdom) Taylors Trucksport Racing	MAN	81	(United Kingdom) Mark Taylor	All	C
(Germany) Team Hahn Racing	Iveco	2	(Germany) Jochen Hahn	All	
(Germany) Team Hahn Racing	Iveco	22	(Germany) Lukas Hahn	4, 8	C
(Germany) Team Schwabentruck	Iveco	44	(Germany) Stephanie Halm	All	

Icon	Class
C	Chrome Class

== Results and standings ==
=== Season summary ===
Round		Circuit	Pole position	Fastest lap	Winning driver	Winning team	CHROME winner
1	R1	(Italy) Misano	(Germany) Jochen Hahn	(Germany) Jochen Hahn	(Hungary) Norbert Kiss	(Hungary) Révész Racing	(United Kingdom) Mark Taylor
1	R2	(Italy) Misano		(Hungary) Norbert Kiss	(Hungary) Norbert Kiss	(Hungary) Révész Racing	(France) Jonathan André
1	R3	(Italy) Misano	(Hungary) Norbert Kiss	(Hungary) Norbert Kiss	(Hungary) Norbert Kiss	(Hungary) Révész Racing	(United Kingdom) Mark Taylor
1	R4	(Italy) Misano		(Hungary) Norbert Kiss	(Hungary) Norbert Kiss	(Hungary) Révész Racing	(Germany) Heinrich Clemens-Hecker
2	R1	(Germany) Lausitzring	(Germany) Jochen Hahn	(Hungary) Norbert Kiss	(Hungary) Norbert Kiss	(Hungary) Révész Racing	(United Kingdom) Bradley Smith
2	R2	(Germany) Lausitzring		(Germany) René Reinert	(Germany) René Reinert	(Germany) Reinert Racing	(United Kingdom) Mark Taylor
2	R3	(Germany) Lausitzring	(Hungary) Norbert Kiss	(Hungary) Norbert Kiss	(Hungary) Norbert Kiss	(Hungary) Révész Racing	(United Kingdom) Mark Taylor
2	R4	(Germany) Lausitzring		Race cancelled			
3	R1	Slovakia Ring	(Hungary) Norbert Kiss	(Hungary) Norbert Kiss	(Hungary) Norbert Kiss	(Hungary) Révész Racing	(United Kingdom) Bradley Smith
3	R2	Slovakia Ring		(Germany) Jochen Hahn	(Hungary) Norbert Kiss	(Hungary) Révész Racing	(Germany) Steffen Faas
3	R3	Slovakia Ring	(Hungary) Norbert Kiss	(Hungary) Norbert Kiss	(Hungary) Norbert Kiss	(Hungary) Révész Racing	(Germany) Heinrich Clemens-Hecker
3	R4	Slovakia Ring		Race cancelled			
4	R1	(Germany) Nürburgring	(Hungary) Norbert Kiss	(Hungary) Norbert Kiss	(Hungary) Norbert Kiss	(Hungary) Révész Racing	(Germany) Lukas Hahn
4	R2	(Germany) Nürburgring		(Hungary) Norbert Kiss	(Spain) Antonio Albacete	(Germany) T Sport Bernau	(Germany) Lukas Hahn
4	R3	(Germany) Nürburgring	(Hungary) Norbert Kiss	(Hungary) Norbert Kiss	(Hungary) Norbert Kiss	(Hungary) Révész Racing	(Germany) Lukas Hahn
4	R4	(Germany) Nürburgring		(Hungary) Norbert Kiss	(Portugal) José Eduardo Rodrigues	(Portugal) Reboconort Racing Truck Team	(Germany) Lukas Hahn
5	R1	(Czech Republic) Most	(Hungary) Norbert Kiss	(Hungary) Norbert Kiss	(Hungary) Norbert Kiss	(Hungary) Révész Racing	(Germany) Heinrich Clemens-Hecker
5	R2	(Czech Republic) Most		(Germany) Sascha Lenz	(Portugal) José Eduardo Rodrigues	(Portugal) Reboconort Racing Truck Team	(United Kingdom) John Newell
5	R3	(Czech Republic) Most	(Hungary) Norbert Kiss	(Hungary) Norbert Kiss	(Hungary) Norbert Kiss	(Hungary) Révész Racing	(Germany) Heinrich Clemens-Hecker
5	R4	(Czech Republic) Most		(Hungary) Norbert Kiss	(Germany) Stephanie Halm	(Germany) Team Schwabentruck	(Germany) Heinrich Clemens-Hecker
6	R1	(Belgium) Zolder	(Hungary) Norbert Kiss	(Hungary) Norbert Kiss	(Hungary) Norbert Kiss	(Hungary) Révész Racing	(Germany) Heinrich Clemens-Hecker
6	R2	(Belgium) Zolder		(Hungary) Norbert Kiss	(Germany) Jochen Hahn	(Germany) Team Hahn Racing	(United Kingdom) Mark Taylor
6	R3	(Belgium) Zolder	(Hungary) Norbert Kiss	(Hungary) Norbert Kiss	(Hungary) Norbert Kiss	(Hungary) Révész Racing	(United Kingdom) Luke Garrett
6	R4	(Belgium) Zolder		(Germany) Jochen Hahn	(Germany) René Reinert	(Germany) Reinert Racing	(United Kingdom) Mark Taylor
7	R1	(France) Le Mans	(Hungary) Norbert Kiss	(Hungary) Norbert Kiss	(Hungary) Norbert Kiss	(Hungary) Révész Racing	(United Kingdom) Bradley Smith
7	R2	(France) Le Mans		(Portugal) José Eduardo Rodrigues	(Germany) René Reinert	(Germany) Reinert Racing	(United Kingdom) John Newell
7	R3	(France) Le Mans	(Hungary) Norbert Kiss	(Hungary) Norbert Kiss	(Hungary) Norbert Kiss	(Hungary) Révész Racing	(Germany) Heinrich Clemens-Hecker
7	R4	(France) Le Mans		(Germany) Jochen Hahn	(Germany) René Reinert	(Germany) Reinert Racing	(Germany) Heinrich Clemens-Hecker
8	R1	(Spain) Jarama	(Hungary) Norbert Kiss	(Hungary) Norbert Kiss	(Hungary) Norbert Kiss	(Hungary) Révész Racing	(United Kingdom) Bradley Smith
8	R2	(Spain) Jarama		(Portugal) José Eduardo Rodrigues	(United Kingdom) John Newell	(United Kingdom) NWT Motorsport	(United Kingdom) John Newell
8	R3	(Spain) Jarama	(Hungary) Norbert Kiss	(Hungary) Norbert Kiss	(Hungary) Norbert Kiss	(Hungary) Révész Racing	(United Kingdom) Mark Taylor
8	R4	(Spain) Jarama		(Spain) Antonio Albacete	(Spain) Antonio Albacete	(Germany) T Sport Bernau	(United Kingdom) Mark Taylor

=== Drivers standings ===
At each race, points are awarded to the top ten classified finishers using the following structure:

Position	**1st**	**2nd**	**3rd**	**4th**	**5th**	**6th**	**7th**	**8th**	**9th**	**10th**
Points (races 1 and 3)	20	15	12	10	8	6	4	3	2	1
Points (races 2 and 4)	10	9	8	7	6	5	4	3	2	1

=== Overall Standings ===
Pos.	Driver	MIS (Italy)				LAU (Germany)				SVK (Slovakia)				NUR (Germany)				MOS (Czech Republic)				ZOL (Belgium)				LMS (France)				JAR (Spain)				Pts.
1	(Hungary) Norbert Kiss	1	1	**1**	1	1	6	**1**	C	**1**	1	**1**	C	**1**	3	**1**	3	**1**	2	**1**	3	**1**	8	**1**	3	**1**	4	**1**	8	**1**	4	**1**	8	419
2	(Germany) Jochen Hahn	**2**	2	2	5	**2**	5	2	C	2	6	2	C	2	4	2	2	4	3	2	5	3	1	2	7	3	3	2	3	2	3	4	4	325
3	(Germany) Stephanie Halm	3	4	4	3	3	7	3	C	6	2	7	C	4	6	6	4	5	5	8	1	5	5	5	4	5	2	6	2	6	2	6	3	229
4	(Germany) Sascha Lenz	6	3	Ret	4	5	3	6	C	3	4	Ret	C	6	8	4	5	3	4	3	4	2	4	4	6	2	5	3	5	Ret	8	2	6	224
5	(Germany) René Reinert	5	6	7	2	4	1	4	C	4	5	6	C	5	2	DNS	8	6	7	5	2	9	6	7	1	8	1	7	1	3	12	3	7	201
6	(Spain) Antonio Albacete	4	Ret	3	DNS	9	8	5	C	5	DNS	13	C	7	1	3	6	2	6	4	6	4	3	3	5	6	6	5	4	4	Ret	8	1	194
7	(Portugal) José Eduardo Rodrigues	7	5	5	6	6	4	11	C	7	3	8	C	8	5	7	1	7	1	6	7	8	2	6	2	4	8	4	DSQ	5	5	5	5	176
8	(United Kingdom) Mark Taylor	8	Ret	6	Ret	8	2	7	C	13	11	11	C	9	9	8	Ret	15	DNS	9	9	7	7	9	8	Ret	DNS	9	7	9	9	7	2	72
9	(Germany) Heinrich Clemens-Hecker	12	9	8	7	10	Ret	10	C	12	10	3	C	15	Ret	10	16	8	13	7	8	6	9	15	11	Ret	10	8	6	14	13	9	9	56
10	(United Kingdom) Bradley Smith	9	8	13	10	7	9	9	C	8	8	5	C	12	12	12	9	12	10	10	11	11	13	13	13	7	9	13	14	7	7	11	12	46
11	(United Kingdom) John Newell	11	11	10	8	11	11	12	C	10	9	10	C	10	11	9	10	10	8	11	10	12	14	10	10	9	7	10	9	8	1	12	11	41
12	(Germany) Lukas Hahn													3	7	5	7													10	6	10	10	36
13	(Germany) Steffen Faas	Ret	DNS	Ret	Ret	12	14	Ret	C	9	7	4	C	11	10	16	12	DNS	Ret	Ret	DNS	15	16	14	14	DNS	DNS	12	12	12	17	16	16	17
14	(Spain) Luis Recuenco	14	10	14	11	13	10	8	C	14	13	9	C	14	13	14	13	9	11	12	12	10	10	11	15	11	14	11	11					11
15	(United Kingdom) Luke Garrett	13	13	9	DNS	14	12	DNS	C	11	12	12	C	17	14	11	11	11	9	13	DNS	13	11	8	9	12	Ret	14	10	13	11	14	Ret	10
16	(France) Jonathan André	10	7	11	9																	14	12	12	12					11	10	13	14	8
17	(Germany) Stefan Kursch	15	12	12	12									13	15	13	14					16	15	16	DNS	10	12	17	15	16	15	18	17	1
18	(United Kingdom) Simon Reid																									14	11	15	DSQ	15	14	17	15	0
19	(Czech Republic) Martin Macík																	13	12	14	13													0
20	(United Kingdom) Craig Reid																									13	13	16	13	17	16	15	13	0
21	(Germany) Christian Ruppert	16	14	15	Ret	15	13	13	C	15	14	14	C	16	16	15	15	14	14	15	14					15	15	18	16					0
Pos.	Driver	MIS (Italy)				LAU (Germany)				SVK (Slovakia)				NUR (Germany)				MOS (Czech Republic)				ZOL (Belgium)				LMS (France)				JAR (Spain)				Pts.

Colour	Result
Gold	Winner
Silver	Second place
Bronze	Third place
Green	Points classification
Blue	Non-points classification
Blue	Non-classified finish (NC)
Purple	Retired, not classified (Ret)
Red	Did not qualify (DNQ)
Red	Did not pre-qualify (DNPQ)
Black	Disqualified (DSQ)
White	Did not start (DNS)
White	Withdrew (WD)
White	Race cancelled (C)
Blank	Did not practice (DNP)
Blank	Did not arrive (DNA)
Blank	Excluded (EX)

**Bold** – Pole
Italics – Fastest Lap

== Bibliography ==
- Göttl, Thomas Paul; Trost, Oliver (2025). "Truck Race Spezial 2025". Fernfahrer (Special Edition) (in German). Stuttgart: ETM Verlag. ISSN 0257-3180.
