= 1984 Gran Premio dell'Adriatico =

1984 Adriatic Grand Prix

Race details
- Date: 22 July 1984
- Official name: 1984 Gran Premio dell'Adriatico
- Location: Misano Adriatico, Province of Rimini, Emilia-Romagna, Italy
- Course: Circuito Internazionale Santa Monica
- Course length: 3.488 km (2.167 miles)
- Distance: 58 laps, 202.304 km (125.686 miles)

Pole position
Driver	(Brazil) Roberto Moreno	Ralt-Honda
- Time: 1:08.72

Fastest lap
Driver	(Brazil) Roberto Moreno	Ralt-Honda
- Time: 1:08.50

Podium
First	(New Zealand) Mike Thackwell	Ralt-Honda
Second	(France) Philippe Streiff	AGS-BMW
Third	(France) Pierre Petit	March-BMW

The 1984 Gran Premio dell'Adriatico (Grand Prix of the Adriatic Sea) took place on July 22, and was the eighth round of the 1984 European Championship for F2 Drivers. It was held at the Circuito Internazionale Santamonica, near the town of Misano Adriatico (Province of Rimini) in the frazione of Santamonica, Italy.

== Report ==
=== Entry ===
The F2 brigade returned to Italy, however, the race only contained eighteen cars. Prior to qualification, the PMC Motorsport / BS Automotive team did not arrive with a car for Pascal Fabre.

=== Qualifying ===
Roberto Moreno took the pole position for Ralt Racing Ltd, in their Ralt-Honda RH6, with an average speed of 113.507 mph.

=== Race ===
The race was held over 58 laps of the Misano Circuit. Mike Thackwell won the race for Ralt, driving their Ralt-Honda RH6. The Kiwi won with a time of 1hr 08:15.71ins., and had an average speed of 110.872 mph. Second place went to Frenchman Philippe Streiff aboard the AGS-BMW JH19C, entered by AGS Elf (Armagnac Bigorre). Streiff was one lap adrift. The podium was completed by Pierre Petit in the Onyx Race Engineering's March-BMW 842.

== Classification ==
=== Race result ===
Pos.	No.	Driver	Entrant	Car - Engine	Time, Laps	Reason Out
1st	1	(New Zealand) Mike Thackwell	Ralt Racing Ltd	Ralt-Honda RH6	1hr 08:15.71	
2nd	6	(France) Philippe Streiff	AGS Elf (Armagnac Bigorre)	AGS-BMW JH19C	57	
3rd	5	(France) Pierre Petit	Onyx Race Engineering	March-BMW 842	57	
4th	3	(Belgium) Thierry Tassin	Onyx Race Engineering	March-BMW 842	57	
5th	15	(Italy) Guido Daccò	Sanremo Racing Srl	March-BMW 832	57	
6th	66	(Germany) Christian Danner	PMC Motorsport / BS Automotive	March-BMW 842	57	
7th	9	(Italy) Roberto Del Castello	Minardi Team	Minardi-BMW M283	57	
8th	44	(Sweden) Tomas Kaiser	PMC Motorsport / BS Automotive Ltd	March-BMW 842	57	
9th	8	(Austria) ”Pierre Chauvet”	Emco Sports	March-BMW 842	57	
10th	11	(Italy) Lamberto Leoni	Minardi Team	Minardi-BMW M283	56	
11th	21	(Italy) Stefano Livio	AGS Elf (Armagnac Bigorre)	AGS-BMW JH19	55	
12th	18	(Belgium) Didier Theys	Martini Racing, France/ORECA	Martini-BMW 002	52	Engine
NC	2	(Brazil) Roberto Moreno	Ralt Racing Ltd	Ralt-Honda RH6	46	
DNF	17	(France) Michel Ferté	Martini Racing, France/ORECA	Martini-BMW 001	28	Engine
DNF	4	(Italy) Emanuele Pirro	Onyx Race Engineering	March-BMW 842	12	Valve spring
DNF	10	(Italy) Alessandro Nannini	Minardi Team	Minardi-BMW M283	10	Engine

- Fastest lap: Roberto Moreno, 1:08.50secs. (113.871 mph)

Sporting positions
Preceded by (England) Jonathan Palmer; 1983	Gran Premio dell'Adriatico	Succeeded by
