= MAN TG-range =

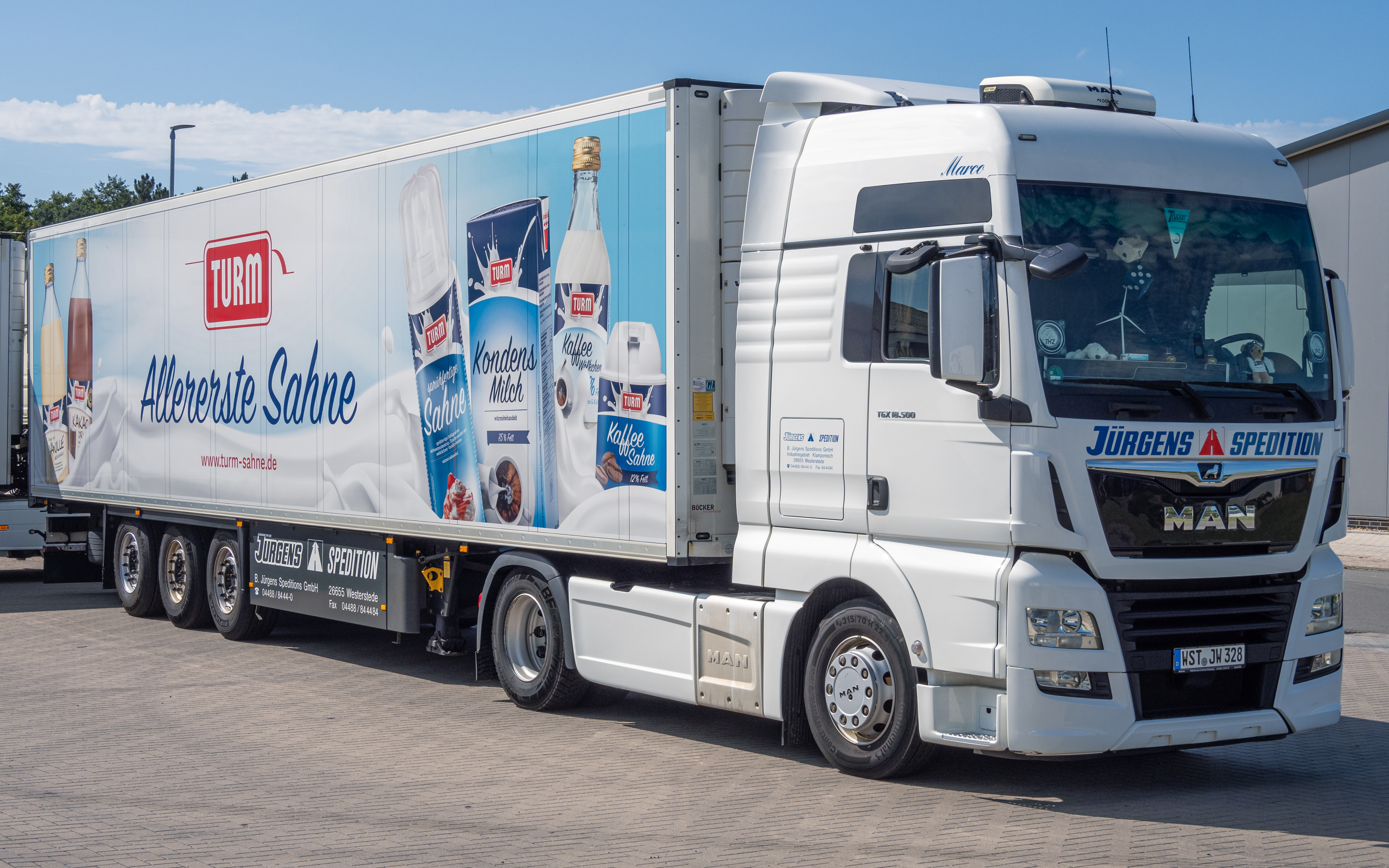
- MAN TGX pulling a refrigerated trailer

Overview
- Manufacturer: MAN Truck & Bus
- Also called: Volkswagen Meteor (TGX-based); ERF ECT (TGA-based)
- Production: 1999–present
- Model years: 2000–present
- Assembly: MAN TG-Range; Europe; Germany: Munich, Salzgitter; Austria: Steyr; Poland: Kraków; CKD; Russia: Shushary, Saint Petersburg; Indonesia: East Jakarta; Malaysia: Rawang; Mexico: Querétaro; Philippines: Meycauayan, Bulacan; South Africa: Pinetown; Thailand: Bangkok; Uzbekistan: Samarkand; VW Meteor; Brazil: Resende

Body and chassis
- Class: Commercial vehicle
- Body style: Forward control (TGA/TGL/TGM/TGS/TGX)
- Layout: Front engine, front wheel drive (some TGE's) rear wheel drive or all wheel drive (other models)
- Related: ERF ECT/ECM/ECL; Sinotruk Sitrak

Powertrain
- Engine: TGE: 2.0L EA288 evo I4 (Turbocharged) Other models: 4.6 L D0834 I4 (Turbocharged); 6.9 L D0836 I6 (Turbocharged); 9.0 L D1556 I6 (Turbocharged); 10.5 L D2066 I6 (Turbocharged); 12.4 L D2676 I6 (Turbocharged); 15.2 L D3876 I6 (Turbocharged); 16.2 L D2868 V8 (Turbocharged)
- Transmission: Manual (standard); TipMatic (AMT); Scania Opticruise

Chronology
- Predecessor: MAN F8; MAN F2000/L2000/M2000

The MAN TG-range is a series of trucks produced since 1999 by the German vehicle manufacturer MAN Truck & Bus. It is the successor to the F2000, L2000, and M2000 series. It consists of the TGA (now discontinued in 2007), TGL, TGM, TGS, and TGX.

The TG range is currently made up of five models with the introduction of the TGE light commercial vehicle, a rebadged Volkswagen Crafter.

== Forward control version ==
=== First generation (1999–2007) ===
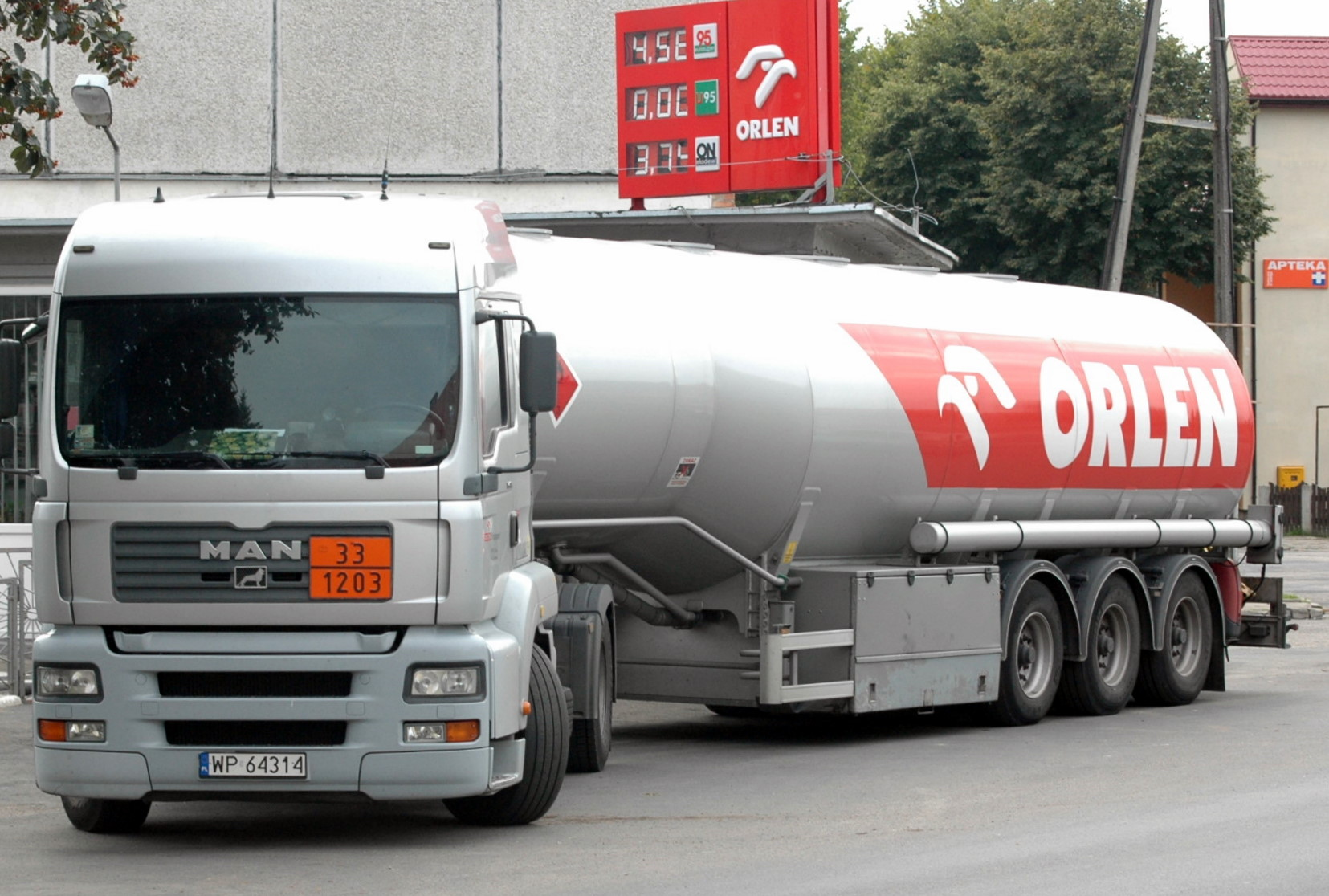
MAN TGA tank truck operated by PKN Orlen

The forward control version was released in 1999, replacing the existing F2000, L2000 and M2000 series. It was initially developed in Germany. The first heavy duty cab was the TGA. Available models included L, LX, XL, XLX, and XXL. After its discontinuation in 2007, the TGA was replaced by the new TGX and TGS models. In addition to a manual transmission, these models are also available with the company's TipMatic automated manual transmission.

In 2005, the TGL and TGM were introduced as the first both light and medium duty trucks by MAN.

TGA was also badged as ERF ECT in United Kingdom until ERF marque was discontinued in 2007.

=== Second generation (2007–2020) ===
In 2007, the 16.2 L D28 series turbocharged V8 engine became available as an option in the TGX.

In 2012, all new models were revealed with a chrome Lion grille and updated styling. These models featured largely the same powertrain, however now Euro 6 compliant. The D2868 V8 was also discontinued due to a lack of demand, now replaced with the 15.2 L D3876 I6.

In 2016, a facelift was revealed, it features a refreshed lower bumper along with a new black backed Lion logo on the grille. The TGS and TGX also received 20 HP and 100 N m power increase on all engine selections, which are now Euro 6c compliant. Some models also now share gearboxes with the sister brand Scania.

In 2019, a minor facelift was rolled out which featured refreshed interior and gauge cluster, and on the TGS and TGX; a further 10 HP and 100 N m increase on all engine selections. All engines are also now Euro 6d compliant.

=== Third generation (2020–) ===
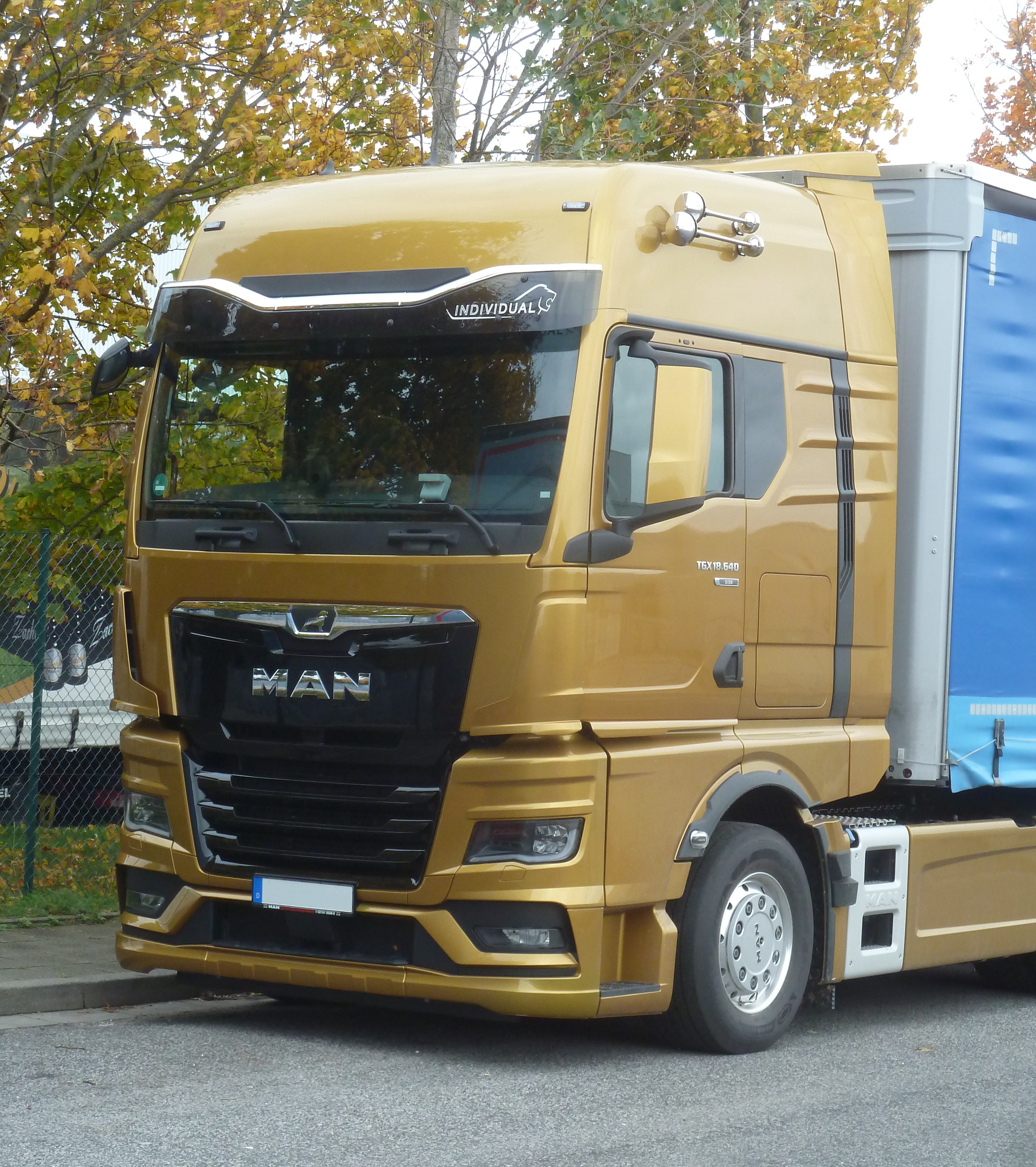
MAN TGX 18.640 version 2020

On 10 February 2020, the second generation range was unveiled to the public at the event in Bilbao, Spain. The range comprises the same four models carried over from the first generation, however with all new styling. It also introduces a new fully-digital instrument cluster for the first time in a MAN vehicle. While this generation keeps the basic cab and frame structure identical, the styling has been fully updated with a new look. The new TGX's cab also sits 10 cm higher on the frame for additional comfort, and the largest cab no longer has a special large windshield. The range also introduced improved aerodynamics, more fuel efficient engines and a more ergonomic experience for drivers.

The engines are carried over with no difference from the 2019 facelift of the last generation.

== Safety ==
Euro NCAP test results MAN TGX 4x2 Tractor Unit (2024)
Test	Score
Overall:	3 /5 stars
Safe driving	56%
Crash avoidance	60%
Post crash	80%

Euro NCAP test results MAN TGX 6x2 Rigid (2025)
Test	Score
Overall:	3 /5 stars
Safe driving	56%
Crash avoidance	60%
Post crash	80%

Euro NCAP test results MAN TGM 4x2 Rigid (2026)
Test	Score
Overall:	5 /5 stars
Safe driving	80%
Crash avoidance	80%
Post crash	80%

Euro NCAP test results MAN TGL 4x2 Rigid (2026)
Test	Score
Overall:	5 /5 stars
Safe driving	89%
Crash avoidance	71%
Post crash	80%

== Alternative Fuel ==
=== Electric ===
In 2023 October MAN started the sale of their electric variants of TGX and TGS named eTGX and eTGS respectively. These heavy-duty tractors have range of 800km and can be charged with 750kW charging. The company offered various battery pack configurations and the range varies with the configuration. The trucks are supported by Megawatt Charging System (MCS) and Combined Charging System (CCS) standards. The electric motor powering the tractors has output of 254 kW, 330 kW or 400 kW depending upon the application with 800, 1,150 or 1,250Nm of torque.

=== Hydrogen ===
In 2024 MAN unveiled the hydrogen combustion version of their TGX tractor truck named hTGX. The tractor features a D38 diesel engine based H45 hydrogen combustion engine which is internal combustion engine just like diesel but uses hydrogen instead to diesel unlike hydrogen fuel cell vehicles which use hydrogen to produce electricity and then later power the electric motor. This engine type will help fleet operator achieve higher load capacity, quick refueling and Longer range while cutting down on emissions. The engine produces power of 520 hp and 2500 Nm of torque using 56 kg hydrogen tanks with range of 600 kilometers.

== MAN TGE ==
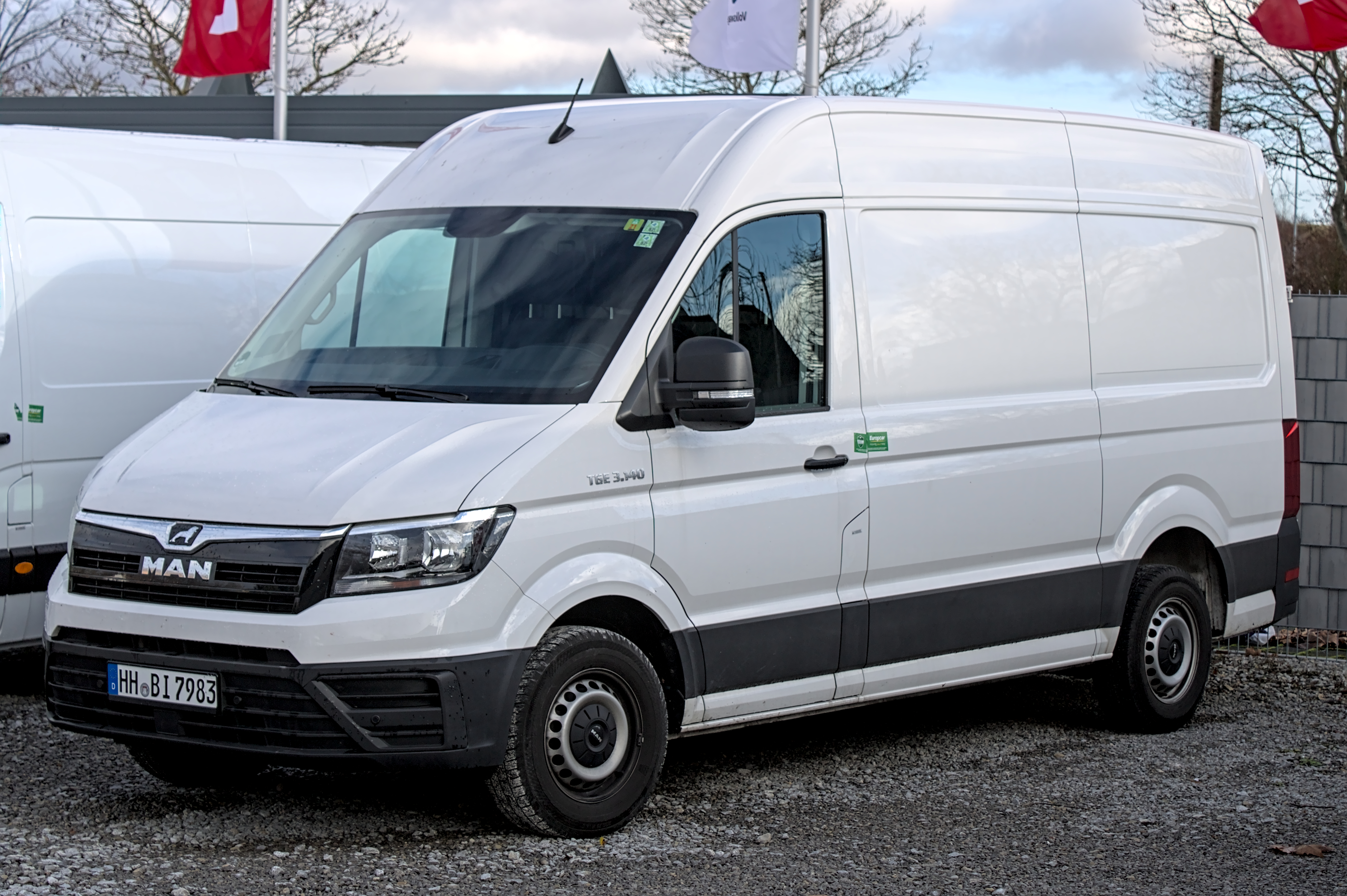
MAN TGE 3.140

The MAN TGE is a badge engineered version of the second generation Volkswagen Crafter. It is assembled by Volkswagen Commercial Vehicles in Września, Poland, alongside the Crafter. MAN intends to differentiate itself from Volkswagen by offering a higher standard of service that is aimed at professional customers.

== Volkswagen Meteor ==
The Volkswagen Meteor is a modified version of the first generation MAN TGX, which is made by Volkswagen Truck & Bus in Resende, Brazil. The Meteor was introduced on 1 September 2020 and serves as Volkswagen's flagship truck model. Exterior changes are minimal, with the MAN lion grille being replaced with a new full width grille and Volkswagen logo. The interior is largely unchanged from the TGX, aside from a Volkswagen branded steering wheel.

== Motorsport ==
The truck won the European Truck Racing Championship every year from 2010 to 2016, and from 2021 to 2025.

It also won the 2007 Dakar Rally.
