= Jochen Hahn =

German truck race driver (born 1974)

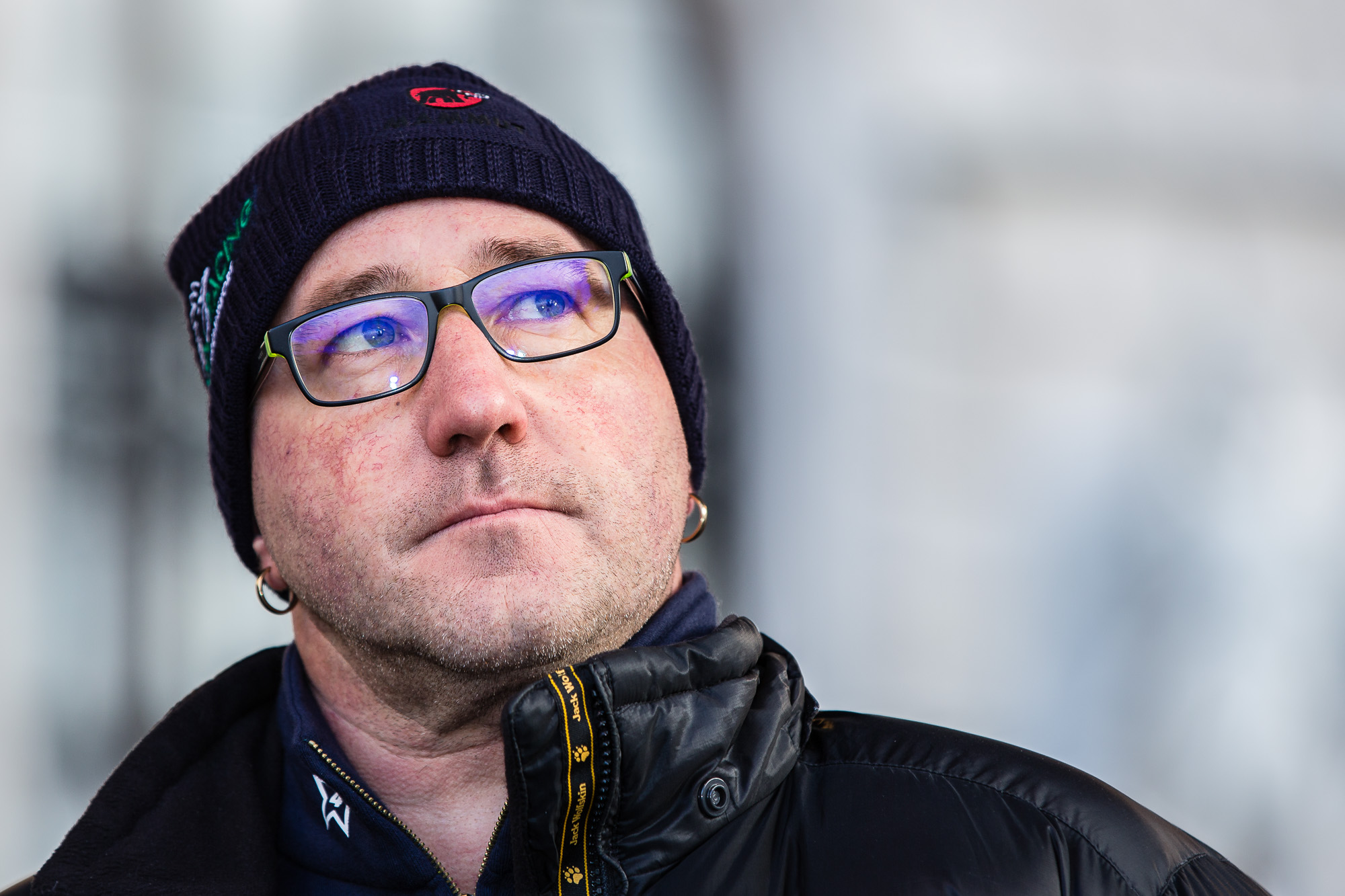
- Jochen Hahn
- Nationality: Germany
- Born: August 18, 1974 (age 52) Altensteig

FIA European Truck Racing Championship career
- Years active: 2000-
- Teams: Team Hahn Racing

Championship titles
- 2011, 2012, 2013, 2016, 2018, 2019: 6

Awards
- 2008, 2009, 2010, 2011, 2012, 2013, 2016: Most beloved truck racer, Drivers Driver Award

Jochen Hahn (born 18 April 1974, in Altensteig) is a German truck race driver. Team Hahn Racing participates at the ETRC, driving a Mercedes race truck until 2007, when Mercedes decided to stop participating at the ETRC in 2007. Since 2008, the team has raced a MAN race truck. The 2008 truck was built in just 8 weeks. Following nine years at the wheel of an MAN race truck, the team of the four-time European Truck Racing Champion switched makes. As the 2017 season began, Team Hahn Racing started piloting Iveco race trucks.

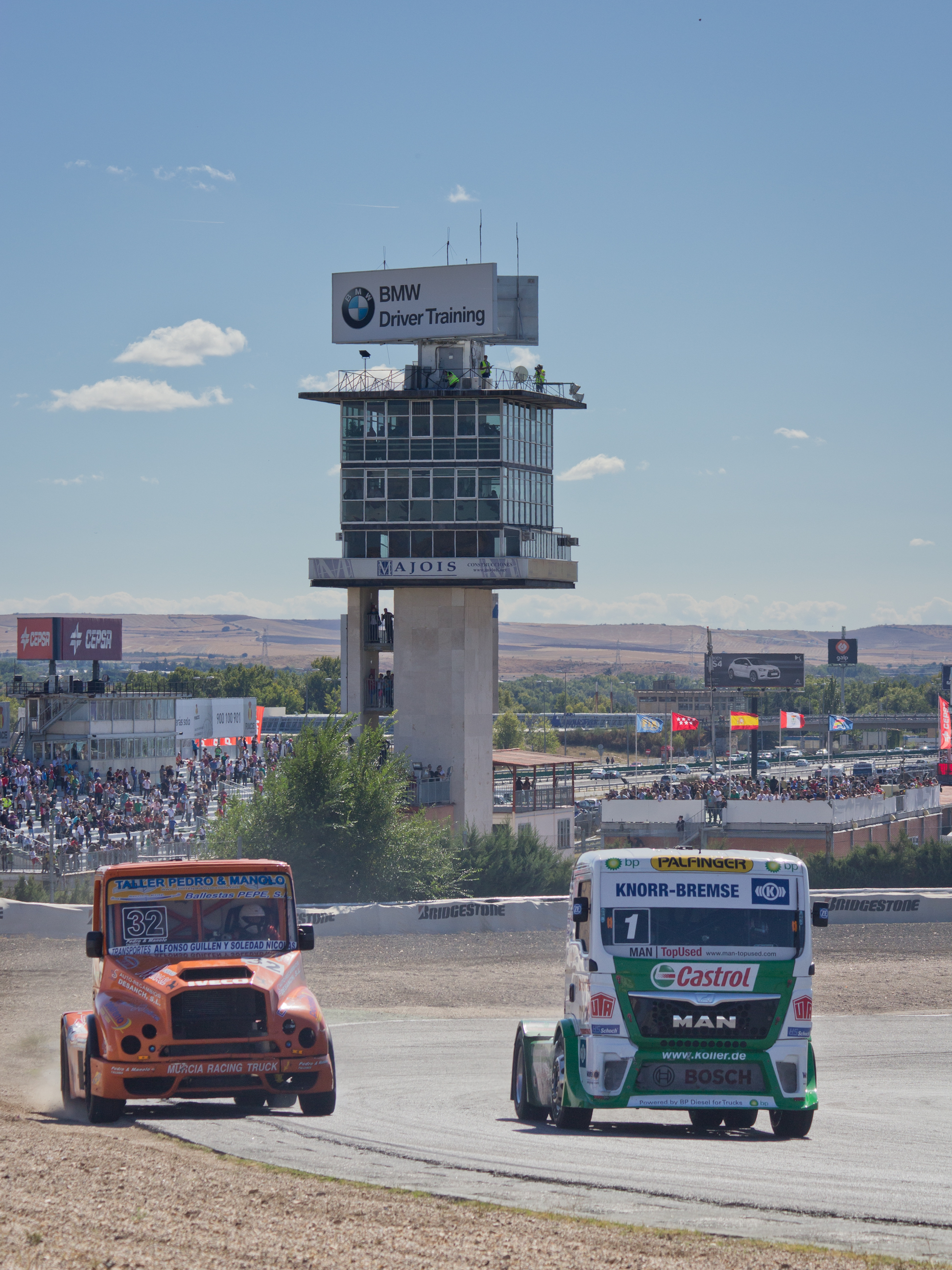
Pedro Ignacio García Marco and Jochen Hahn on the Circuito del Jarama during the 2013 season.

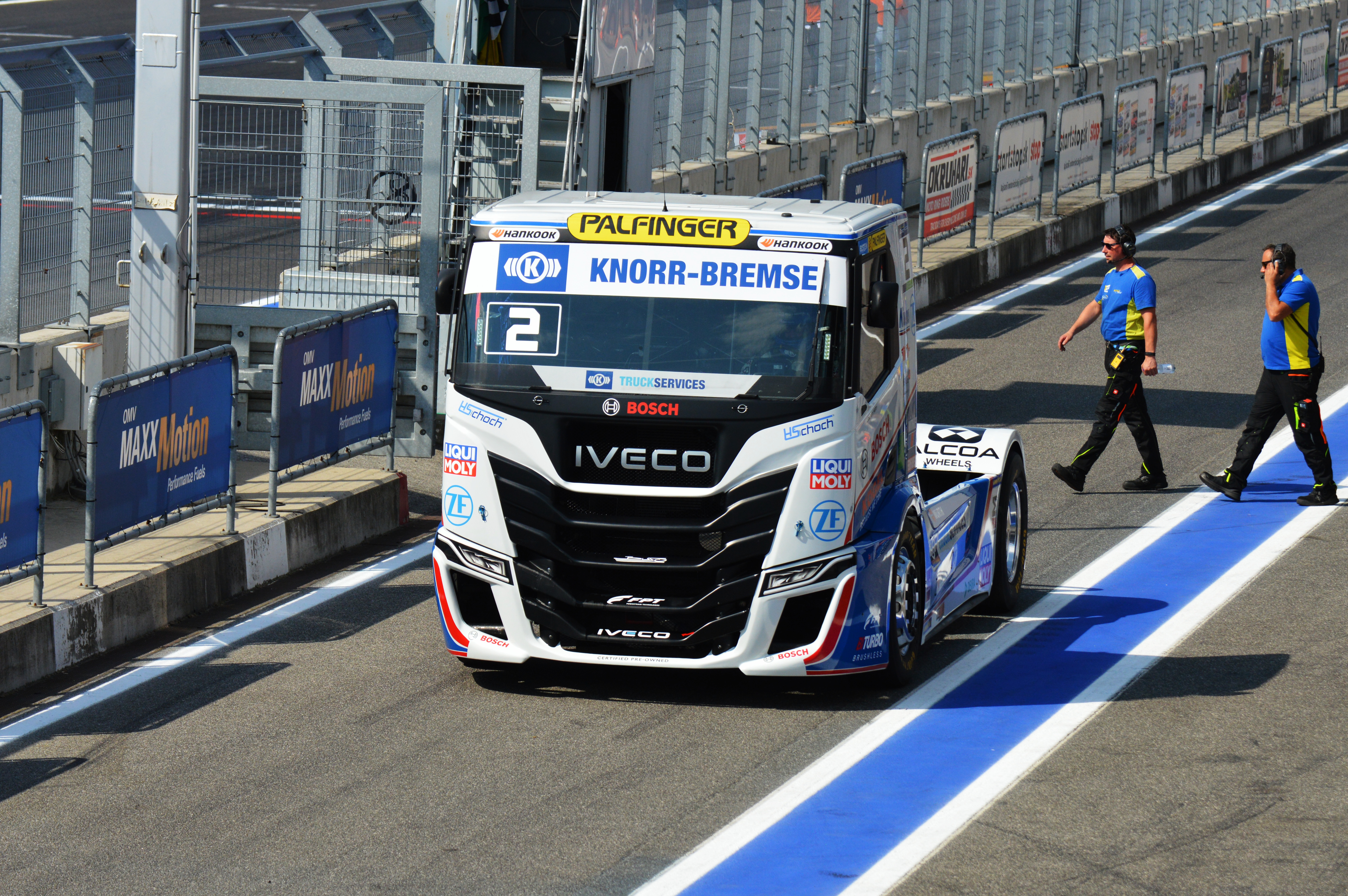
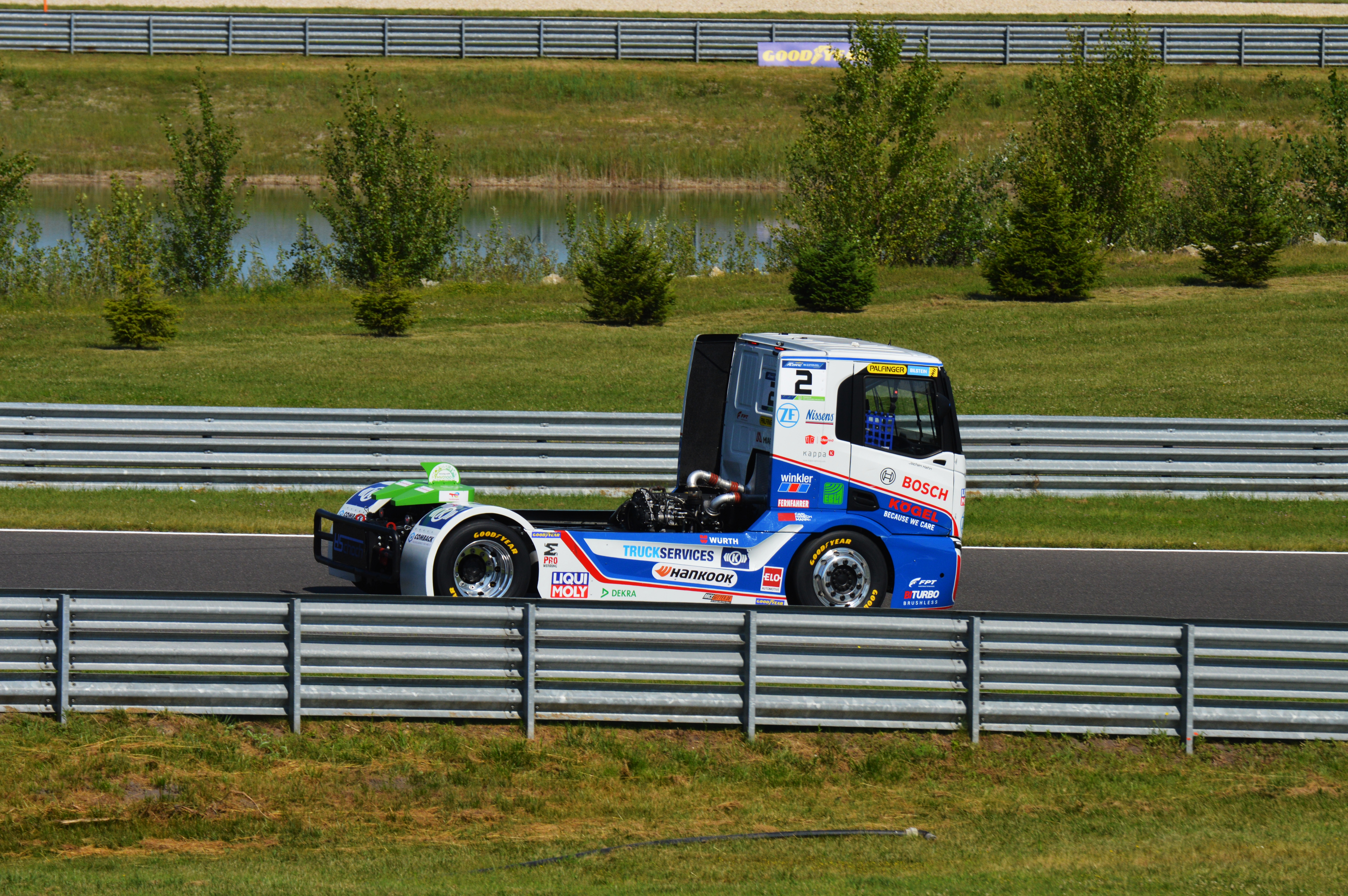
Hahn with Iveco at the 2024 FIA ETRC Truck Race of Slovakia.

== Career ==
Jochen Hahn has competed at the FIA European Truck Racing Championship since 2000, the year he took over the race-truck steering wheel from his father and current team manager Konrad Hahn. Konrad Hahn started his career at the European championship in 1996, achieving three podium positions and a fifth rank on the overall standings by 1999. That same year he survived a major crash unharmed. During the race at the Circuit Zolder, his truck crashed into a wall at 156 km/h (97 mi/h). He then stopped driving at the ETRC and his son Jochen Hahn took over the driver's seat. After his first season in 2000, Jochen Hahn ranked fourth in overall standings. Between 2000 and 2010 he continuously finished the season ranking between sixth and third on the overall standings.

In 2011, 2012 and 2013 as Jochen Hahn and his Team Hahn Racing won the FIA European Truck Racing Championship.

Before Hahn, only Curt Göransson (1988,1989 and 1990: Class B title) and Heinz-Werner Lenz (1997, 1998 and 1999: Race-Trucks Class title) had managed to win three titles in a row. Jochen Hahn and his team are the first ones to accomplish such a success since the Super-Race-Truck class was abolished in 2006 thus leaving a single class at the championship. Owing to this success, the race truck of the third hat-trick European champion in the history of the European Truck Racing Championship was labelled with the number 1 once more throughout the 2014 season. In addition, Jochen Hahn was voted "most beloved truck racer" for the sixth time in a row by the visitors of the 2013 Truck Grand Prix on Nürburgring.

Following two seasons (2014 and 2015) finishing vice champion and third, Jochen Hahn and his team once again won the European Truck Racing Championship in 2016 – thus collecting the 4th title piloting an MAN race truck built by the team itself. Jochen Hahn achieved his 100th race victory and was honored with the Drivers Driver Award.

After nine successful years driving race trucks of the same brand, the team decided to break fresh ground as the 2017 season began – piloting an Iveco race truck for the first time ever in the team's history. After switching from Mercedes-Benz to MAN race trucks in 2008, switching to Iveco is the second significant change of makes the team performed. In the end, Jochen Hahn finished vice-champion once again in 2017.

In 2018, Team Hahn Racing would once again start the season piloting a completely new Iveco race truck. Jochen was consistently in the fight for podium finishes all season and was able to secure his fifth European Championship at Le Mans, one round before the end of the season.

In 2019, Jochen Hahn took twelve pole positions out of thirteen early races, including a win on every race day during the first seven rounds of the ETRC season. He bagged the championship for the sixth time ever in his career in Race 2 of Le Mans with only six races left to go.

== Titles and Successes ==
- 2008: Fourth (4th) on the overall standings, second at the team championship, most beloved truck racer.
- 2009: Third (3rd) on the overall standings, second at the team championship, most beloved truck racer.
- 2010: Third (3rd) on the overall standings, most beloved truck racer.
- 2011: European Truck Racing Champion, most beloved truck racer.
- 2012: European Truck Racing Champion, most beloved truck racer.
- 2013: European Truck Racing Champion (hat-trick), most beloved truck racer.
- 2014: European Truck Racing Vice-Champion
- 2015: Third (3rd) on the overall standings
- 2016: European Truck Racing Champion (for the 4th time), 100th victory at FIA European Truck Racing Championships, Drivers Driver Award (chosen by all of the competitors)
- 2017: European Truck Racing Vice-Champion on the team's first Iveco race truck
