= Markas Šilkūnas =

Lithuanian racing driver (born 2009)

- Šilkūnas in 2026
- Nationality: (Lithuania) Lithuanian
- Born: 1 January 2009 (age 17) Kaunas, Lithuania
- Relatives: Vanesa Šilkūnaitė (sister)

Formula 4 CEZ Championship career
- Debut season: 2026
- Current team: Jenzer Motorsport
- Car number: 26
- Starts: 17
- Wins: 0
- Podiums: 6
- Poles: 0
- Fastest laps: 1
- Best finish: 6th in 2026

Markas Šilkūnas (born 1 January 2009) is a Lithuanian racing driver who last competed for Jenzer Motorsport in the Formula 4 CEZ Championship and the BMW Turbo Cup class of the Baltic Touring Car Championship.

== Personal life ==
Šilkūnas is the brother of fellow racing driver Vanesa Šilkūnaitė.

== Career ==
=== Karting (2019–2026) ===
Šilkūnas began karting in 2019, finishing runner-up in the 60 Mini category of the Lithuanian Karting Championship. In 2020, Šilkūnas finished runner-up in the RMC Baltic Championship in Micro Max, before winning the Lithuanian title in 60 Mini the following year. During 2021, Šilkūnas also raced extensively in international competitions, finishing sixth in the RMC International Trophy and the RMC Grand Finals.

Moving up to junior karts in 2022, Šilkūnas finished ninth in the Andrea Margutti Trophy and represented Lithuania in the FIA Motorsport Games Karting Sprint Cup. In 2023, Šilkūnas won the Lithuanian title in OK-J, as well as finishing third in the Karting Academy Trophy. Stepping up to senior karts in 2024, Šilkūnas finished runner-up in the Champions of the Future Academy Program in OK-N and took a gold medal in the FIA Motorsport Games Karting Sprint Cup, representing Lithuania. The following year, Šilkūnas won the Champions of the Future Academy Program title, as well as competing in OK in Europe with VDK Racing and Tony Kart Racing Team. In early 2026, Šilkūnas won the first edition of the Champions of the Future Academy Program Macau in OK-N.

=== Formula 4 (2026) ===
For the rest of the winter of 2026, Šilkūnas joined Jenzer Motorsport to compete in the Formula Winter Series, before continuing with them to compete in the Formula 4 CEZ Championship. In the former, Šilkūnas took a best result of 12th four times in the five-round season en route to a 33rd-place points finish. After taking a double podium at the Slovakia Ring, Šilkūnas then took four other podiums between the Brno and Hungaroring rounds to end the year sixth overall in points and secure the rookie title.

=== Touring car racing (2026) ===
In parallel, Šilkūnas raced in the BMW Turbo Cup class of the Baltic Touring Car Championship. During 2026, Šilkūnas also competed in the Aurum 1006 km alongside his sister Vanesa Šilkūnaitė and Tomas Rudokas.

== Karting record ==
=== Karting career summary ===
Season	Series	Team	Position
2020	Andrea Margutti Trophy — 60 Mini	Novalux Srl	NC
2020	RMC International Trophy — Mini Max	Pilenai Racing	16th
2021	WSK Champions Cup — 60 Mini	Pilenai Racing Team	NC
2021	WSK Super Master Series — 60 Mini (Note: Šilkūnas competed for Pilenai Racing Team in rounds 1, 4 and for Novalux Srl in round 3.)	Pilenai Racing Team	96th
2021	Andrea Margutti Trophy — 60 Mini	Pilenai Racing Team	NC
2021	WSK Euro Series — 60 Mini	Gamoto ASD	91st
2021	RMC International Trophy — Mini Max	Pilenai Racing Team	6th
2021	Rotax Max Euro Golden Trophy — Mini Max	Pilenai Racing Team	19th
2021	RMC Grand Finals — Mini Max	Pilenai Racing Team	6th
2022	Champions of the Future Winter Series — OK-J	Pilenai Racing	NC
2022	Champions of the Future — OK-J	Pilenai Racing	54th
2022	Andrea Margutti Trophy — OK-J	Gamoto Srl	9th
2022	CIK-FIA Academy Trophy	Mindaugas Šilkūnas	20th
2022	CIK-FIA European Championship — OK-J	Pilenai Racing	101st
2022	Italian Karting Championship — OK-J	Gamoto Srl	16th
2022	CIK-FIA World Championship — OK-J	Pilenai Racing	NC
2022	FIA Motorsport Games Sprint Cup — Junior	Team Lithuania	14th
2022	Ayrton Senna Trophy — X30 Senior	Gamoto ASD	7th
2023	WSK Champions Cup — OK-J	Gamoto Srl	27th
2023	WSK Super Master Series — OK-J	Gamoto Srl	117th
2023	Champions of the Future Euro Series — OK-J	Pilenai Racing; Gamoto Srl (Note: Šilkūnas competed for Pilenai Racing Team in round 1 and for Gamoto Srl in rounds 2–5.)	40th
2023	CIK-FIA European Championship — OK-J	Pilenai Racing	NC
2023	CIK-FIA Academy Trophy	Mindaugas Šilkūnas	3rd
2023	WSK Euro Series — OK-J	Gamoto Srl	98th
2023	CIK-FIA World Championship — OK-J	Gamoto Srl	NC
2023	Deutsche Kart-Meisterschaft — OK-J		NC
2023	Estonian Championship — OK-J		10th
2023	Champions of the Future Academy Program — OK-NJ		6th
2024	WSK Champions Cup — OK	CRG Racing Team	20th
2024	WSK Super Master Series — OK	CRG Racing Team	34th
2024	Champions of the Future Euro Series — OK	CRG Racing Team; VDK Racing (Note: Šilkūnas competed for CRG Racing Team in rounds 1–4 and for VDK Racing in round 5.)	58th
2024	CIK-FIA European Championship — OK	CRG Racing Team	24th
2024	Champions of the Future Academy Program — OK-N		2nd
2024	WSK Euro Series — OK	CRG Racing Team; KR Motorsport (Note: Šilkūnas competed for CRG Racing Team in round 1 and for KR Motorsport in round 2.)	7th
2024	CIK-FIA World Championship — OK	VDK Racing	28th
2024	IAME Warriors Final — X30 Senior	VDK Racing	NC
2024	FIA Motorsport Games Sprint Cup — Senior	Team Lithuania	1st
2025	IAME Winter Cup — X30 Senior	VDK Racing	NC
2025	Champions of the Future Academy Program — OK-N		1st
2025	Champions of the Future Euro Series — OK	VDK Racing; Tony Kart Racing Team (Note: Šilkūnas competed for VDK Racing in rounds 1–3 and for Tony Kart Racing Team in rounds 4–5.)	37th
2025	CIK-FIA European Championship — OK	VDK Racing; Tony Kart Racing Team (Note: Šilkūnas competed for VDK Racing in rounds 1–3 and for Tony Kart Racing Team in round 4.)	38th
2025	CIK-FIA World Championship — OK	Tony Kart Racing Team	NC
2026	Champions of the Future Academy Program Macau — OK-N		1st

== Racing record ==
=== Racing career summary ===
Season	Series	Team	Races	Wins	Poles	F/Laps	Podiums	Points	Position
2026	Formula Winter Series	Jenzer Motorsport	14	0	0	0	0	0	33rd
2026	Formula 4 CEZ Championship	Jenzer Motorsport	17	0	0	1	6	192	6th
2026	Baltic Touring Car Championship – BMW Turbo Cup							60	5th
2026	Aurum 1006 km – TC4	Contribee.com racing	1	0	0	0	1	—N/a	**2nd**

=== Complete Formula Winter Series results ===
(key) (Races in bold indicate pole position; races in italics indicate fastest lap)

Year	Entrant	1	2	3	4	5	6	7	8	9	10	11	12	13	14	15	Pos	Points
2026	Jenzer Motorsport	EST; 1; 15	EST; 2; 15	EST; 3 Ret	POR; 1; 12	POR; 2; 19	POR; 3 DNS	CRT; 1; 28	CRT; 2; 23	CRT; 3; 20	ARA; 1; 12	ARA; 2; 27	ARA; 3; 12	CAT; 1; 17	CAT; 2; 12	CAT; 3; 13	33rd	0

=== Complete Formula 4 CEZ Championship results ===
(key) (Races in bold indicate pole position) (Races in italics indicate fastest lap)

Year	Team	1	2	3	4	5	6	7	8	9	10	11	12	13	14	15	16	17	18	19	20	21	22	23	24	DC	Points
2026	Jenzer Motorsport	RBR1; 1; 7	RBR1; 2; 9	RBR1; 3	RBR1; 4; 8	SAL; 1; 5	SAL; 2	SAL; 3; 4	SAL; 4 C	SVK; 1; 3	SVK; 2	SVK; 3; 6	SVK; 4; 3	MOS; 1; 4	MOS; 2; 14	MOS; 3	MOS; 4; 7	BRN; 1	BRN; 2; 3	BRN; 3; 3	BRN; 4; 6	HUN; 1; 2	HUN; 2	HUN; 3; 3	HUN; 4; 16	6th	192

* Season still in progress
