= David Walther =

Danish racing driver (born 2008)

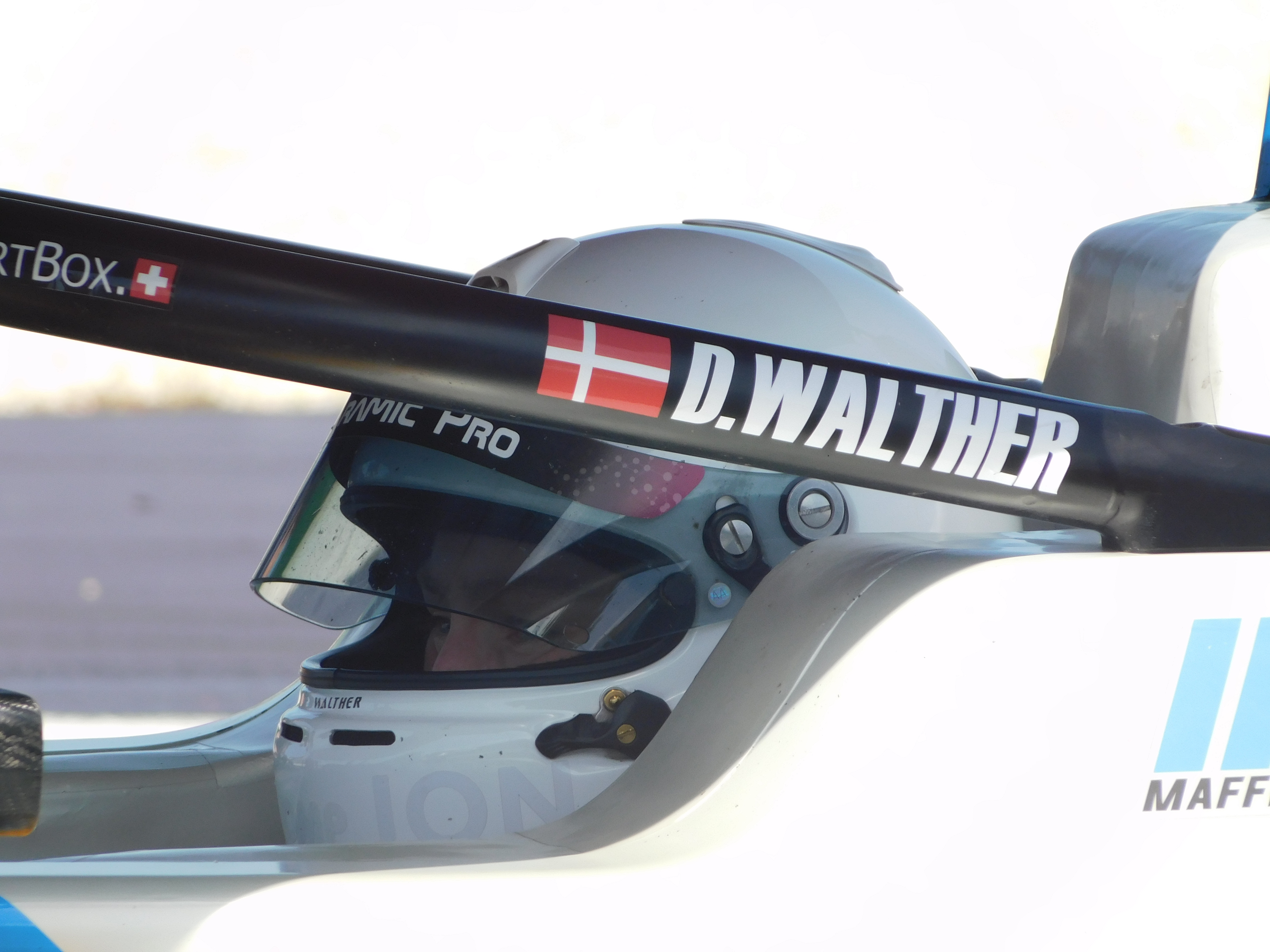
- Walther in 2025
- Nationality: (Denmark) Danish
- Born: 14 February 2008 (age 18) Dragør, Denmark

Italian F4 Championship career
- Debut season: 2025
- Current team: Maffi Racing
- Car number: 83
- Starts: 39
- Wins: 0
- Podiums: 3
- Poles: 0
- Fastest laps: 0
- Best finish: 17th in 2026

Previous series
- 2025: Formula Winter Series
- Statistics up to date as of 2 November 2026.

David Walther (born 14 February 2008) is a Danish racing driver currently who last competed in the Italian F4 and Formula 4 CEZ Championship for Maffi Racing.

== Career ==
=== Karting (2013–2024) ===
Walther began karting in 2013, primarily racing in Denmark until 2020, the year in which he won the OK-J title. Moving to Koski Motorsport to compete in International races for 2021, Walther won the Trofeo Grifone, as well as representing Denmark in the Karting Academy Trophy, in which he finished runner-up to Maciej Gładysz. Towards the end of the year, Walther also finished fourth in the Karting World Championship from pole position, before finishing fifth in the WSK Final Cup.

Remaining with Koski for his step-up to senior karts in 2022, Walther most notably was sixth in the WSK Open Cup and ninth in the end-of-year WSK Final Cup's standings. Continuing with the team for 2023, Walther began the year by winning the WSK Champions Cup and taking fourth in the WSK Super Master Series points. Following a mid-season switch to Tony Kart Racing Team, Walther took fifth in the WSK Euro Series standings before ending the year with a ninth-place finish in the WSK Final Cup standings. In his final year of karting in 2024, Walther most notably took fourth in the WSK Super Master Series standings, in a year in which he also made his debut in KZ2.

=== Formula 4 (2025–present) ===
In 2025, Walther made his single-seater debut for Maffi Racing in select rounds of the Formula Winter Series, in which he took a best result of 12th at Valencia, before remaining with the team for a dual campaign in the Formula 4 CEZ and Italian F4 Championships. In the former, Walther took his maiden single-seater win at the second Red Bull Ring round and scored three other podiums to take seventh in points, whereas in the Italian series he only took a best result of 12th at Misano.

The following year, Walther continued with Maffi for another dual campaign in the Formula 4 CEZ and Italian F4 Championships. In the former, Walther kicked off the season with two wins at the Red Bull Ring, two podiums at the Salzburgring and a win at the Slovakia Ring to take an early championship lead. Walther then took three podiums at Most, ahead of the team's departure from the series in the midst of the Brno weekend as he fell down to fourth in points. In the latter, Walther began the season by taking his maiden series podiums between the Misano and Vallelunga rounds, which were the highlights of the season as he fell to 17th in the final standings.

== Karting record ==
=== Karting career summary ===
Season	Series	Team	Position
2017	Sjællandsmesterskabet — Cadett Mini		18th
2018	Sjællandsmesterskabet — Cadett Junior		9th
2020	Danish Championship — OK-J		1st
2020	Swedish Championship — OK-J		2nd
2020	South Garda Winter Cup — OK-J	Nanne Thaden	NC
2021	WSK Champions Cup — OK-J	Koski Motorsport	NC
2021	WSK Super Master Series — OK-J	Koski Motorsport	33rd
2021	Trofeo Grifone — OK-J	Koski Motorsport	1st
2021	Champions of the Future — OK-J	Koski Motorsport	23rd
2021	Karting European Championship — OK-J	Koski Motorsport	28th
2021	Deutsche Kart-Meisterschaft — OK-J	Koski Motorsport	42nd
2021	WSK Euro Series — OK-J	Koski Motorsport	16th
2021	Karting Academy Trophy	Marcus Walther	2nd
2021	Karting World Championship — OK-J	Koski Motorsport	4th
2021	WSK Final Cup — OK-J	Koski Motorsport	5th
2022	WSK Super Master Series — OK	Koski Motorsport	12th
2022	Champions of the Future Euro Series — OK	Koski Motorsport	17th
2022	Karting European Championship — OK	Koski Motorsport	15th
2022	WSK Euro Series — OK	Koski Motorsport	23rd
2022	Italian Karting Championship — OK	Koski Motorsport	4th
2022	Karting World Championship — OK	Koski Motorsport	35th
2022	WSK Open Cup — OK	Koski Motorsport	6th
2022	WSK Final Cup — OK	Koski Motorsport	9th
2023	WSK Champions Cup — OK	Koski Motorsport	1st
2023	WSK Super Master Series — OK	Koski Motorsport	4th
2023	Champions of the Future Euro Series — OK	Koski Motorsport	12th
2023	Karting European Championship — OK	Koski Motorsport	12th
2023	WSK Euro Series — OK	Koski Motorsport; Tony Kart Racing Team (Note: Walther competed for Koski Motorsport in round 1 and for Tony Kart Racing Team in round 2.)	5th
2023	Karting World Championship — OK	Tony Kart Racing Team	24th
2023	WSK Final Cup — OK	Tony Kart Racing Team	9th
2024	WSK Super Master Series — OK	Tony Kart Racing Team	4th
2024	Champions of the Future Euro Series — OK	Tony Kart Racing Team	23rd
2024	Karting European Championship — OK	Tony Kart Racing Team	11th
2024	WSK Open Cup — KZ2	Tony Kart Racing Team	51st
2024	Karting European Championship — KZ2	Tony Kart Racing Team	63rd
2024	Karting World Championship — OK	Tony Kart Racing Team	21st
2024	Champions of the Future Shifters — KZ2	Tony Kart Racing Team	28th
2024	Karting World Cup — KZ2	Tony Kart Racing Team	43rd
2024	WSK Final Cup — OK	Tony Kart Racing Team	14th

== Racing record ==
=== Racing career summary ===
Season	Series	Team	Races	Wins	Poles	F/Laps	Podiums	Points	Position
2025	Formula Winter Series	Maffi Racing	6	0	0	0	0	0	26th
2025	Formula 4 CEZ Championship	Maffi Racing	12	1	0	5	4	113	7th
2025	Italian F4 Championship	Maffi Racing	19	0	0	0	0	0	33rd
2026	Formula 4 CEZ Championship	Maffi Racing	13	3	2	2	11	237	4th
2026	Italian F4 Championship	Maffi Racing	20	0	0	0	3	142	17th

* Season still in progress.

=== Complete Formula Winter Series results ===
(key) (Races in bold indicate pole position) (Races in italics indicate fastest lap)

Year	Team	1	2	3	4	5	6	7	8	9	10	11	12	DC	Points
2025	Maffi Racing	POR; 1	POR; 2	POR; 3	CRT; 1 Ret	CRT; 2; 20	CRT; 3; 12	ARA; 1; 23	ARA; 2; 19	ARA; 3; 21	CAT; 1	CAT; 2	CAT; 3	26th	0

=== Complete Formula 4 CEZ Championship results ===
(key) (Races in bold indicate pole position) (Races in italics indicate fastest lap)

Year	Team	1	2	3	4	5	6	7	8	9	10	11	12	13	14	15	16	17	18	19	20	21	22	23	24	DC	Points
2025	Maffi Racing	RBR1; 1; 8	RBR1; 2; 3	RBR1; 3; 7	RBR2; 1; 3	RBR2; 2; 1	RBR2; 3; 5	SAL; 1; 12	SAL; 2; 4	SAL; 3; 3	MOS; 1 Ret	MOS; 2; 5	MOS; 3; 10	SVK; 1	SVK; 2	SVK; 3	BRN; 1	BRN; 2	BRN; 3							7th	113
2026	Maffi Racing	RBR1; 1; 3	RBR1; 2	RBR1; 3; 1	RBR1; 4; 1	**SAL**; **1**; 3	SAL; 2	**SAL**; **3**; 2	SAL; 4 C	SVK; 1	SVK; 2; 2	SVK; 3; 2	SVK; 4; 1	MOS; 1; 3	MOS; 2	MOS; 3; 3	MOS; 4; 3	BRN; 1	BRN; 2; 5	BRN; 3; 5	BRN; 4 DNS	HUN; 1	HUN; 2	HUN; 3	HUN; 4	4th	237

=== Complete Italian F4 Championship results ===
(key) (Races in bold indicate pole position; races in italics indicate fastest lap)

Year	Team	1	2	3	4	5	6	7	8	9	10	11	12	13	14	15	16	17	18	19	20	21	22	23	24	25	26	27	28	DC	Points
2025	Maffi Racing	MIS1; 1; 25	MIS1; 2 Ret	MIS1; 3	MIS1; 4 DNQ	VLL; 1; 13	VLL; 2 Ret	VLL; 3	VLL; 4; 15	MNZ; 1; 19	MNZ; 2; 18	MNZ; 3; 32	MUG; 1; 14	MUG; 2; 13	MUG; 3; 33	IMO; 1; 18	IMO; 2 C	IMO; 3 Ret	CAT; 1; 27	CAT; 2; 23	CAT; 3 C	MIS2; 1	MIS2; 2; 16	MIS2; 3; 12	MIS2; 4; 23	MIS2; 5; 15				33rd	0
2026	Maffi Racing	MIS1; 1	MIS1; 2; 7	MIS1; 3; 3	MIS1; 4; 3	VLL; 1	VLL; 2; 12	VLL; 3; 3	VLL; 4; 6	MNZ; 1; 29†	MNZ; 2; 18	MNZ; 3	MNZ; 4; 13	MUG1; 1; 30†	MUG1; 2	MUG1; 3; 13	MUG1; 4 Ret	IMO; 1; 23	IMO; 2; 20	IMO; 3	IMO; 4 DNQ	MIS2; 1; 4	MIS2; 2; 14	MIS2; 3	MIS2; 4; 19	MUG2; 1	MUG2; 2; 9	MUG2; 3 DSQ	MUG2; 4; 27	17th	142
