= Elia Weiss =

German racing driver (born 2009)

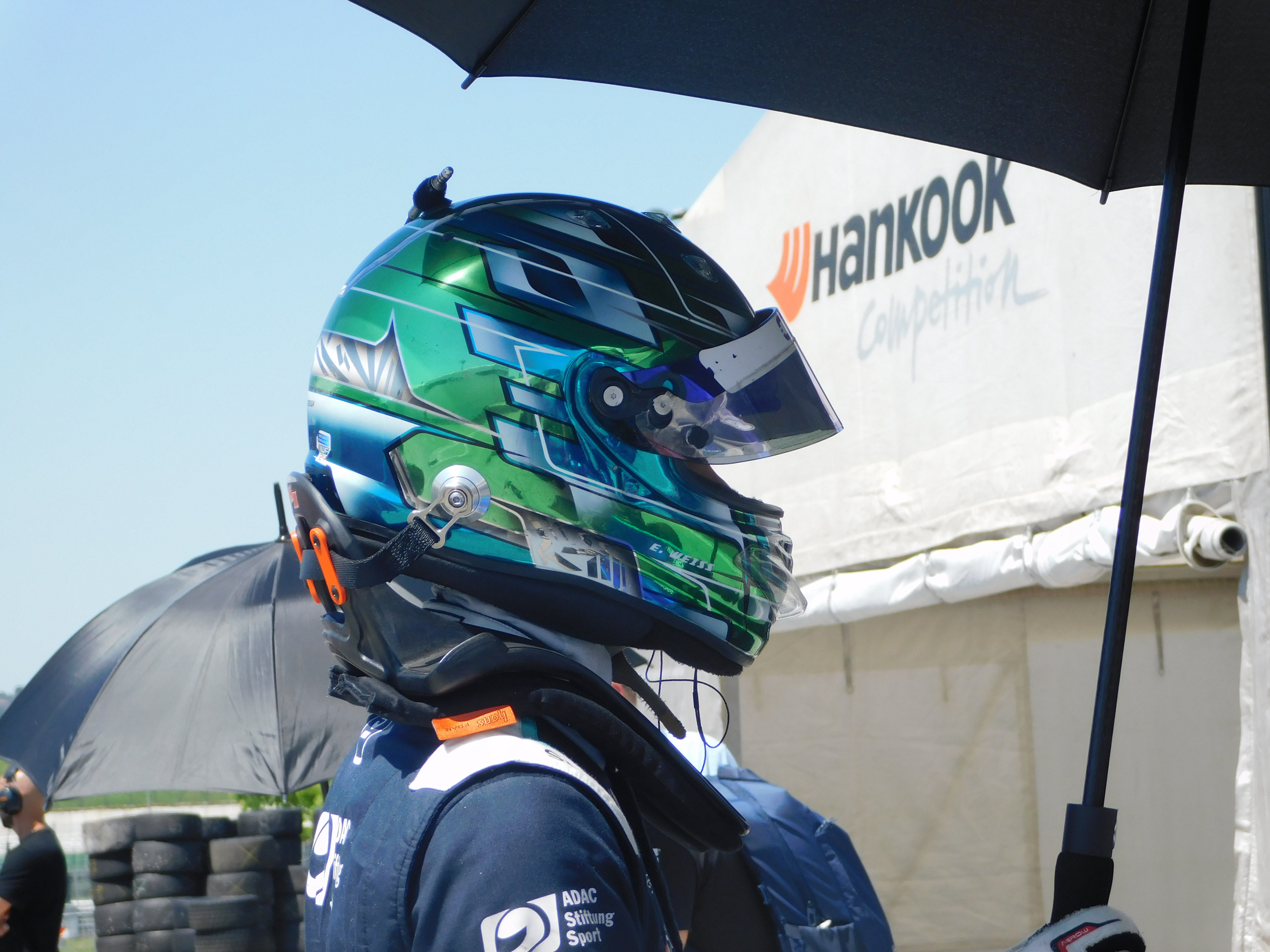
- Weiss in 2025
- Nationality: (Germany) German
- Born: Elia Luis Weiß; 22 June 2009 (age 17) Munich, Germany
- Relatives: Claudia Hürtgen (mother)

Italian F4 Championship career
- Debut season: 2025
- Current team: Jenzer Motorsport
- Car number: 22
- Former teams: Cram Motorsport
- Starts: 36
- Wins: 1
- Podiums: 3
- Poles: 2
- Fastest laps: 2
- Best finish: 14th in 2026

Previous series
- 2025: Formula Winter Series

Championship titles
- 2026: Formula 4 CEZ Championship

Elia Luis Weiß, alternatively Weiss, (born 22 June 2009) is a German racing driver who last competed in the Formula 4 CEZ Championship and the Italian F4 Championship for Jenzer Motorsport.

== Personal life ==
Weiss is the son of former sportscar and Extreme E racer Claudia Hürtgen.

== Career ==
=== Karting ===
Weiss began karting in 2020 at the age of ten, winning twice on his ADAC Kart Masters debut, and finishing fifth in the Mini standings. Weiß stayed in the Mini class in 2021, winning the ADAC Kart Masters title on dropped scores, and also making his debut in WSK competitions in both the Champions Cup and Euro Series.

Moving to X30 Junior in 2022, Weiss only competed in German championships, finishing runner-up to Finn Wiebelhaus in ADAC Kart Masters, and finishing fourth in the season-ending ADAC Kart Bundesendlauf event at Ampfing. Weiss remained in X30 Junior the following year as a member of Motorsport Team Germany, once again finishing runner-up in the ADAC Kart Masters standings, this time to Phil Colin Strenge. Weiss also made appearances in various karting championships around Europe, most notably finishing sixth in the Lonato round of the WSK Open Series.

Stepping up to X30 Senior for 2024, Weiss clinched the DKM title by 43 points over Phil Colin Strenge at the final round at Wackersdorf. In the same year, Weiss represented Germany in the FIA Motorsport Games Karting Sprint Senior discipline, and finished tenth in the IAME Euro Series standings with a best result of second at Wackersdorf.

=== Formula 4 ===
At the start of 2025, Weiss made his car racing debut as he rejoined Motorsport Team Germany, contesting the Formula Winter Series with Cram Motorsport. He competed in the final two rounds, finishing 28th overall with a highest finish of 13th at Barcelona. Weiss remained with the same team to compete in the Italian F4 Championship for the rest of the year. At the fourth round in Mugello, following a collision with Luca Viișoreanu and Guy Albag in Race 2, he was unable to compete in the final race of the weekend due to excessive damage. In the seven-round season, Weiss scored a best result of 12th in race three at Imola as he ended the year 35th in the overall standings. During 2025, Weiss also competed in the last two rounds of the E4 Championship, in which he scored a best result of ninth in race two at Monza for Jenzer Motorsport.

The following year, Weiss joined R-ace GP to compete in the start-of-the-year UAE4 Series, in which he scored a best result of fourth in race two at Lusail to take 16th in the overall standings. For the rest of 2026, Weiss joined Jenzer Motorsport to make his debut in the Formula 4 CEZ Championship. Starting out the season with three wins between the Red Bull Ring and Salzburgring rounds, Weiss then took seven wins between the Most and Hungaroring rounds en route to the F4 CEZ title. Contesting a parallel campaign with the team in Italian F4, Weiss took pole at the first Mugello round, but didn't make the final after retiring twice during the round. After being stripped from his maiden podium in the second Misano round on post-race penalties, Weiss rebounded at the Mugello finale, taking Jenzer's first win in the series since 2021 in race two and finishing the other two races on the podium to end the year 14th overall.

=== Formula E ===
In July 2025, Weiss tested a Formula E car for the first time at the Tempelhof Airport Street Circuit, driving for Porsche during the Formula E Berlin rookie test alongside Ayhancan Güven, becoming the youngest driver to test Formula E machinery. In 2026, Weiss returned to Porsche to partake in his second consecutive Formula E rookie test, held at Jarama in March.

=== Sportscars ===
During 2026, Weiss made his sportscar debut at the 12 Hours of Nürburgring for Hofor Racing by Bonk Motorsport, winning the race in the GT4 class alongside his mother Claudia Hürtgen, Michael Bonk and Martin Kroll.

== Karting record ==
=== Karting career summary ===
Season	Series	Team	Position
2020	ADAC Kart Masters – Mini	DS Corse	5th
2021	ADAC Kart Masters – Mini	TB Racing Team	1st
2021	WSK Champions Cup – Mini	TB Racing Team	71st
2021	WSK Euro Series – Mini	Kidix SRL	NC
2022	ADAC Kart Masters – X30 Junior	TB Racing Team	2nd
2022	ADAC Kart Bundesendlauf – X30 Junior	Valier Motorsport	6th
2023	ADAC Kart Masters – X30 Junior	Dörr Motorsport	2nd
2023	WSK Champions Cup – X30 Junior	Dörr Motorsport	24th
2023	WSK Open Series – X30 Junior (Note: Weiß competed for Victorylane Karting in round 1 and for Aurelien Fath in round 2.)	Victorylane Karting	16th
2023	IAME Euro Series – X30 Junior	Victorylane Karting	NC†
2023	Champions of the Future – OK-Junior	Victorylane Karting	111th
2023	IAME Warriors Final – X30 Junior	Victorylane Karting	59th
2023	CIK-FIA Karting World Championship – OK-Junior	Martins, Nicolas	84th
2024	German Kart Championship – X30 Senior	SIM-ON	1st
2024	IAME Winter Cup – X30 Senior	SIM-ON	54th
2024	IAME Euro Series – X30 Senior	SIM-ON	10th
2024	IAME Warriors Final – X30 Senior	SIM+AC0-ON	28th

== Racing record ==
=== Racing career summary ===
Season	Series	Team	Races	Wins	Poles	F/Laps	Podiums	Points	Position
2025	Formula Winter Series	Cram Motorsport	6	0	0	0	0	0	28th
2025	Italian F4 Championship	Cram Motorsport	19	0	0	0	0	0	35th
2025	E4 Championship	Cram Motorsport	3	0	0	0	0	2	20th
2025	E4 Championship	Jenzer Motorsport	3	0	0	0	0	2	20th
2026	UAE4 Series	R-ace GP	12	0	0	0	0	21	16th
2026	Formula 4 CEZ Championship	Jenzer Motorsport	17	10	7	8	15	369	**1st**
2026	Italian F4 Championship	Jenzer Motorsport	17	1	2	2	3	174	14th
2026	24H Series – GT4	Hofor Racing by Bonk Motorsport	1	1	1	1	1	40	5th

* Season still in progress.

=== Complete Formula Winter Series results ===
(key) (Races in bold indicate pole position) (Races in italics indicate fastest lap)

Year	Team	1	2	3	4	5	6	7	8	9	10	11	12	DC	Points
2025	Cram Motorsport	POR; 1	POR; 2	POR; 3	CRT; 1	CRT; 2	CRT; 3	ARA; 1; 24	ARA; 2; 20	ARA; 3; 28	CAT; 1; 20	CAT; 2; 13	CAT; 3; 16	28th	0

=== Complete Italian F4 Championship results ===
(key) (Races in bold indicate pole position; races in italics indicate fastest lap)

Year	Team	1	2	3	4	5	6	7	8	9	10	11	12	13	14	15	16	17	18	19	20	21	22	23	24	25	26	27	28	DC	Points
2025	Cram Motorsport	MIS1; 1; 26	MIS1; 2; 17	MIS1; 3	MIS1; 4; 32	VLL; 1	VLL; 2; 25	VLL; 3; 15	VLL; 4; 16	MNZ; 1 Ret	MNZ; 2; 28	MNZ; 3 Ret	MUG; 1; 20	MUG; 2 Ret	MUG; 3 WD	IMO; 1 Ret	IMO; 2 C	IMO; 3; 12	CAT; 1; 20	CAT; 2; 30	CAT; 3 C	MIS2; 1; 14	MIS2; 2	MIS2; 3; 20	MIS2; 4; 19	MIS2; 5; 27				35th	0
2026	Jenzer Motorsport	MIS1; 1	MIS1; 2 WD	MIS1; 3 WD	MIS1; 4 WD	VLL; 1	VLL; 2; 19	VLL; 3; 10	VLL; 4 Ret	MNZ; 1; 8	MNZ; 2	MNZ; 3; 7	MNZ; 4; 6	MUG1; 1	**MUG1**; **2** Ret	**MUG1**; **3** Ret	MUG1; 4 DNQ	IMO; 1	IMO; 2; 11	IMO; 3; 10	IMO; 4 Ret	MIS2; 1	MIS2; 2; 21	MIS2; 3; 4	MIS2; 4; 11	MUG2; 1; 3	MUG2; 2	MUG2; 3; 1	MUG2; 4; 2	14th	172

* Season still in progress

=== Complete E4 Championship results ===
(key) (Races in bold indicate pole position; races in italics indicate fastest lap)

Year	Team	1	2	3	4	5	6	7	8	9	DC	Points
2025	Cram Motorsport	LEC; 1	LEC; 2	LEC; 3	MUG; 1; 17	MUG; 2; 24	MUG; 3; 19				20th	2
2025	Jenzer Motorsport							MNZ; 1 Ret	MNZ; 2; 9	MNZ; 3 Ret	20th	2

=== Complete UAE4 Series results ===
(key) (Races in bold indicate pole position; races in italics indicate fastest lap)

Year	Team	1	2	3	4	5	6	7	8	9	10	11	12	DC	Points
2026	R-ace GP	YMC1; 1; 8	YMC1; 2; 12	YMC1; 3; 21	YMC2; 1; 34	YMC2; 2; 18	YMC2; 3 Ret	DUB; 1 Ret	DUB; 2; 31	DUB; 3; 17	LUS; 1; 10	LUS; 2; 4	LUS; 3; 8	16th	21

* Season still in progress

=== Complete Formula 4 CEZ Championship results ===
(key) (Races in bold indicate pole position) (Races in italics indicate fastest lap)

Year	Team	1	2	3	4	5	6	7	8	9	10	11	12	13	14	15	16	17	18	19	20	21	22	23	24	DC	Points
2026	Jenzer Motorsport	RBR1; 1	RBR1; 2; 1	RBR1; 3; 3	RBR1; 4; 2	SAL; 1; 1	**SAL**; **2**; 1	SAL; 3	**SAL**; **4** C	SVK; 1; 2	SVK; 2	SVK; 3; 4	SVK; 4; 6	MOS; 1	MOS; 2; 1	MOS; 3; 1	**MOS**; **4**; 1	BRN; 1; 1	BRN; 2	BRN; 3; 2	**BRN**; **4**; 1	**HUN**; **1**; 1	HUN; 2	**HUN**; **3**; 1	**HUN**; **4**; 2	1st	369

* Season still in progress.
