= Jenzer Motorsport =

Swiss auto racing team

(Switzerland) Jenzer Motorsport
- Founded: 1993
- Founder(s): Andreas Jenzer
- Base: Lyss, Switzerland
- Team principal(s): Andreas Jenzer
- Current series: Italian F4 Championship; Formula 4 CEZ Championship; Formula Winter Series; BOSS GP
- Former series: FIA Formula 3 Championship; GP3 Series; Formula Renault 3.5 Series; Formula Renault V6 Eurocup; International Formula Master; Formula Renault 2.0 WEC; Formula Renault 2.0 Italia; Formule Renault 2.0 Suisse; Formula Pilota China; Formula Abarth; Eurocup Formula Renault 2.0; Formula Renault 2.0 Alps; Swiss Formula Ford; Formula Ford EuroCup; French Formula Ford; German Formula Ford; F4 Spanish Championship
- Current drivers: Italian F4: (Switzerland) 21. Levi Arn (Germany) 22. Elia Weiss (Kyrgyzstan) 23. Artem Severiukhin (Mexico) 24. Nicolás Córtes (Switzerland) 25. Georgiy Zasov (Qatar) 26. Bader Al Sulaiti F4 CEZ: (Czech Republic) 20. Teo Borenstein (Czech Republic) 21. Ella Häkkinen (Germany) 22. Elia Weiss (Switzerland) 25. Georgiy Zasov (Lithuania) 26. Markas Šilkūnas (Czech Republic) 144. Max Karhan
- Teams' Championships: Italian Formula Renault Championship: 2005, 2008; Swiss Formula Renault: 2007, 2008; Formula Abarth: 2011; Formula 4 CEZ Championship: 2023, 2024, 2025
- Drivers' Championships: Swiss Formula Ford: 1993: Hans Pfeuti; 1995: Tazio Pessi; 1996: Iradj Alexander; 1997: Martin Bünzli; 1998: Philipp Mathis; 2000: Walo Schenker; German Formula Ford: 2000: Marc Benz; Formula Renault 2.0 Germany: 2003: Ryan Sharp; Formula Renault 2.0 Italia: 2006: Dani Clos; 2008: Pål Varhaug; Swiss Formula Renault: 2008: Christopher Zanella; 2009: Nico Müller; 2010: Zoël Amberg; International Formula Master: 2009: Fabio Leimer; Formula Abarth: 2011: Patric Niederhauser; Formula Pilota China: 2011: Mathéo Tuscher; Italian F4 Championship: 2016: Marcos Siebert; Formula 4 CEZ Championship: 2023: Ethan Ischer; 2024: Oscar Wurz; 2025: Gino Trappa
- Website: http://www.jenzermotorsport.ch/

Jenzer Motorsport is an auto racing team based in Switzerland. Founded in 1993 by Andreas Jenzer the team is currently competing in Italian F4 and Formula 4 CEZ and has had a number of drivers who would turn out to be successful in motorsport, most notably Formula One driver Yuki Tsunoda and 2015 Nürburgring 24 Hour winner and DTM runner-up Nico Müller.

== History ==
In 1993, Jenzer Motorsport was founded by Andreas Jenzer, who was a racing driver and raced in his own team in the German Formula Ford 1800 Championship. While Hans Pfeuti brought the first title for the team in the Swiss Formula Ford 1800 Championship in the same year. The team repeated success in the Swiss championship in 1995, 1996, 1997, 1998 and 2000 with Tazio Pessi, Iradj Alexander, Martin Bünzli, Philipp Mathis, and Walo Schenker respectively. Also the team competed in French, EuroCup and German Formula Ford. Marc Benz won the German Formula Ford Championship title in 2000.

In 2000, Jenzer Motorsport decided to switch to the Formula Renault 2.0 machinery débuting in the French Formula Renault Championship and competed in the other Formula Renault series. Marc Benz, Neel Jani and Michael Ammermüller finished as runner-up in 2001, 2002 and 2005 Eurocup Formula Renault 2.0 seasons. But in the regional series the team was more successful. They clinched title with Ryan Sharp in 2003 in German Formula Renault. In the Italian Formula Renault Championship they won driver titles with Dani Clos in 2006 and Pål Varhaug in 2008. While in the Swiss Formula Renault Championship their titles was achieved by Christopher Zanella in 2008, Nico Müller in 2009, Zoël Amberg in 2010.

Jenzer Motorsport also raced in the 3.5 Class of Formula Renault since 2003, when Neel Jani finished as runner-up. The team repeated the same result in the next year with Ryan Sharp. But when the V6 Eurocup became Formula Renault 3.5 Series, the team wasn't able to win race and left the series after two seasons. The team moved to International Formula Master in 2007. And in 2009 they won the championship with Fabio Leimer.

After 2009, Jenzer Motorsport left both Formula Renault and International Formula Masters category to join new-for-2010 Formula Abarth and GP3 Series. In the Formula Abarth Italian Series the team collected both drivers' and teams' title with Patric Niederhauser in 2011. While in the GP3 Series, the third place of Nico Müller in 2010 Drivers' Championship still remains the biggest success for the team in the series. After receiving two wins from Patric Niederhauser in the 2012 season, the team endured four years without a win (despite podiums from the likes of Niederhauser, Alex Fontana, Mathéo Tuscher, Ralph Boschung and Arjun Maini) until Maini took victory in the 2017 sprint race at Barcelona.

The team returned to the Formula Renault 2.0 category in 2013, but left again after two seasons, choosing Italian Formula 4 Championship and ADAC Formula 4.

=== GP3 Series ===
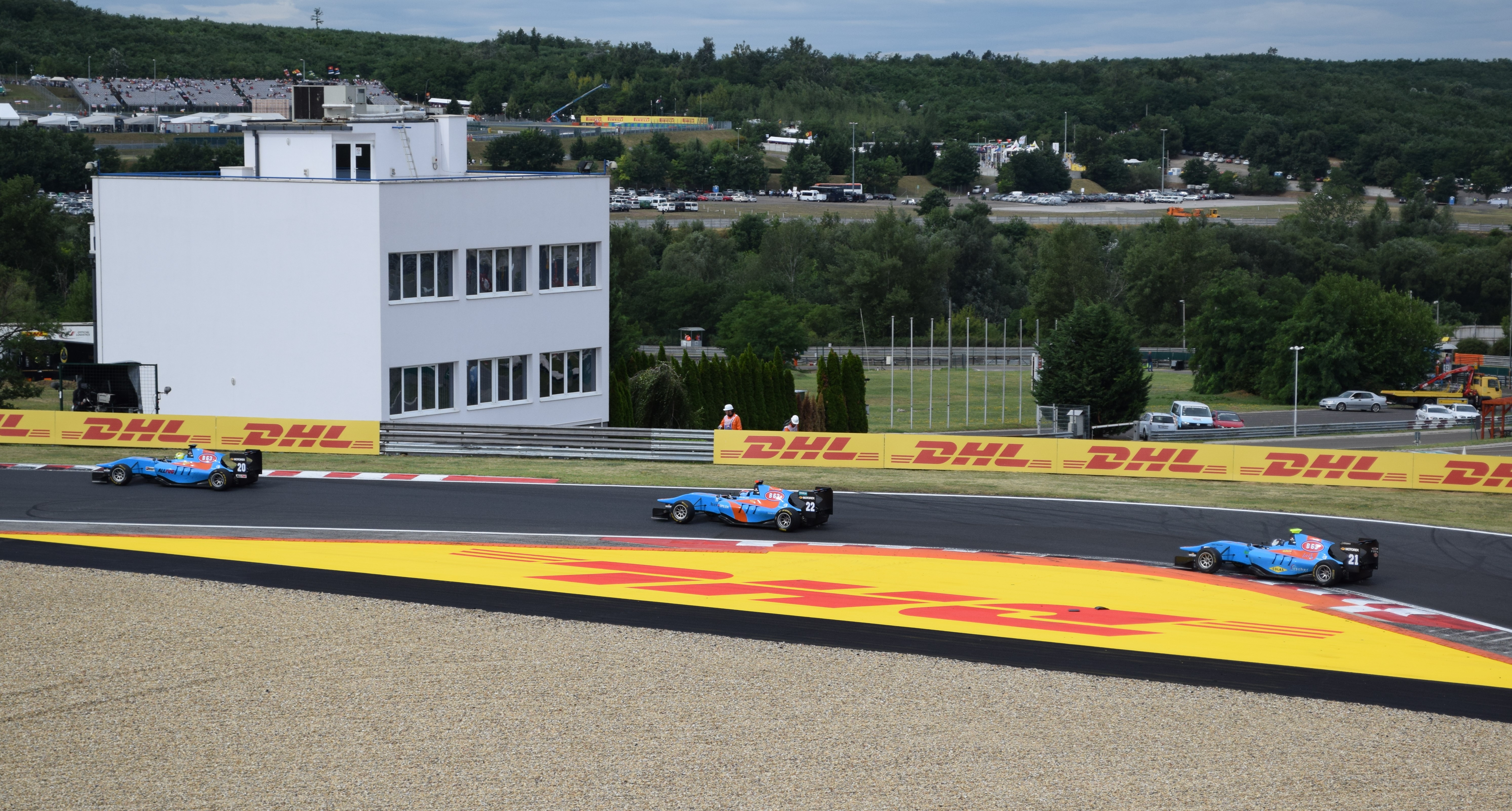
Three Jenzer GP3 cars at Turn 7, Hungaroring (2015)

The team signed for the 2018 season Tatiana Calderón, Juan Manuel Correa and David Beckmann.

=== FIA Formula 3 Championship ===
In 2019, Jenzer joined the newly rebranded FIA Formula 3 Championship with Yuki Tsunoda as their first signed driver and Artem Petrov following in February.

== Current series results ==
=== Italian F4 Championship ===
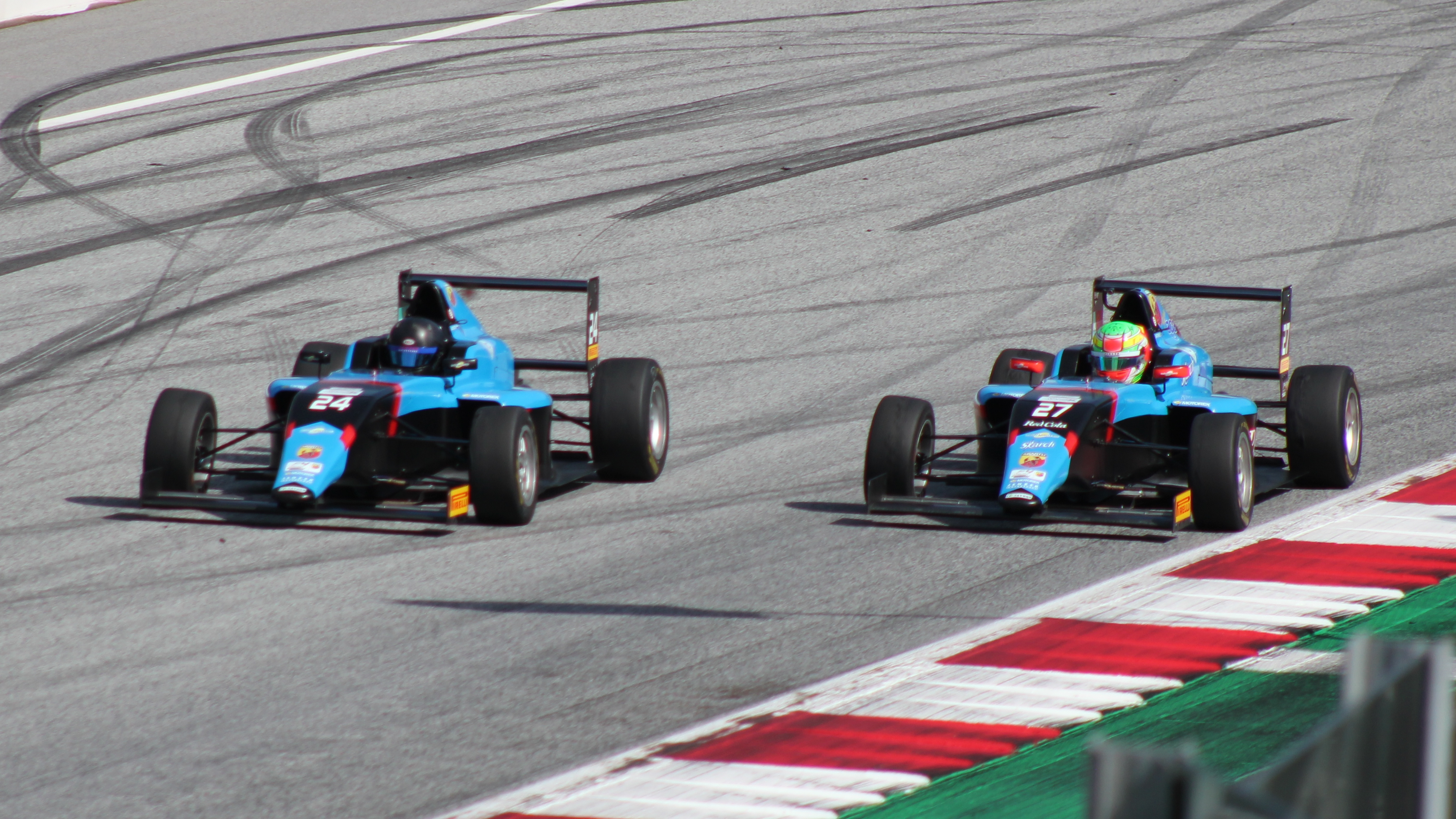
Jenzer Motorsport during the Italian F4 Championship (2021)

Year	Car	Drivers	Races	Wins	Poles	Fast laps	D.C.	T.C.	Points
2014	Tatuus F4-T014	(Bahrain) Ali Al-Khalifa	21	0	0	0	2nd (Note: Italian F4 Trophy)	4th	183
2014	Tatuus F4-T014	(Switzerland) Alain Valente	21	0	0	0	5th	4th	183
2014	Tatuus F4-T014	(Switzerland) Lucas Mauron	21	0	0	0	10th	4th	183
2014	Tatuus F4-T014	(Switzerland) Nico Rindlisbacher	21	0	0	0	21st	4th	183
2015	Tatuus F4-T014	(Argentina) Marcos Siebert	21	2	0	2	5th	3rd	170
2015	Tatuus F4-T014	(Switzerland) Nico Rindlisbacher	16	0	0	0	9th	3rd	170
2015	Tatuus F4-T014	(Switzerland) Lucas Mauron	21	0	0	0	16th	3rd	170
2015	Tatuus F4-T014	(Germany) Arlind Hoti	6	0	0	0	24th	3rd	170
2015	Tatuus F4-T014	(Switzerland) Moritz Müller-Crepon	9	0	0	0	25th	3rd	170
2015	Tatuus F4-T014	(Bahrain) Ali Al-Khalifa	6	0	0	0	35th	3rd	170
2016	Tatuus F4-T014	(Argentina) Marcos Siebert	21	4	4	1	1st	2nd	396
2016	Tatuus F4-T014	(Netherlands) Job van Uitert	18	2	0	3	4th	2nd	396
2016	Tatuus F4-T014	(Argentina) Diego Ciantini	20	0	0	0	20th	2nd	396
2016	Tatuus F4-T014	(Switzerland) Fabio Scherer	9	0	0	0	29th	2nd	396
2016	Tatuus F4-T014	(Germany) Kevin Kratz	9	0	0	0	33rd	2nd	396
2016	Tatuus F4-T014	(Switzerland) Giacomo Bianchi	21	0	0	0	34th	2nd	396
2016	Tatuus F4-T014	(Estonia) Jan-Erik Meikup	3	0	0	0	40th	2nd	396
2017	Tatuus F4-T014	(Netherlands) Job van Uitert	21	4	2	4	2nd	3rd	368
2017	Tatuus F4-T014	(India) Kush Maini	21	0	0	0	7th	3rd	368
2017	Tatuus F4-T014	(Italy) Federico Malvestiti	21	0	0	0	10th	3rd	368
2017	Tatuus F4-T014	(Switzerland) Giacomo Bianchi	21	0	0	0	12th	3rd	368
2017	Tatuus F4-T014	(Argentina) Giorgio Carrara	21	0	0	0	14th	3rd	368
2017	Tatuus F4-T014	(Switzerland) Grégoire Saucy	6	0	0	0	NC (Note: Ineligible for the position in the championship)	3rd	368
2018	Tatuus F4-T014	(Italy) Federico Malvestiti	21	1	2	2	6th	3rd	368
2018	Tatuus F4-T014	(Argentina) Giorgio Carrara	21	0	0	0	7th	3rd	368
2018	Tatuus F4-T014	(Switzerland) Grégoire Saucy	21	0	2	1	11th (Note: Saucy drove for R-ace GP at final round in Mugello)	3rd	368
2018	Tatuus F4-T014	(Mexico) Javier González	15	0	0	0	14th	3rd	368
2018	Tatuus F4-T014	(Malaysia) Nazim Azman	21	0	0	0	17th	3rd	368
2018	Tatuus F4-T014	(Denmark) Oliver Rasmussen	21	0	0	0	10th	3rd	368
2019	Tatuus F4-T014	(United Kingdom) Jonny Edgar	21	0	2	2	10th	6th	136
2019	Tatuus F4-T014	(Argentina) Giorgio Carrara	12	1	0	1	13th	6th	136
2019	Tatuus F4-T014	(Switzerland) Axel Gnos	21	0	0	0	23rd	6th	136
2019	Tatuus F4-T014	(Italy) Emidio Pesce	15	0	0	0	32nd	6th	136
2019	Tatuus F4-T014	(Austria) Stefan Fürtbauer	3	0	0	0	37th	6th	136
2020	Tatuus F4-T014	(Switzerland) Jasin Ferati	17	0	0	0	29th	3rd	168
2020	Tatuus F4-T014	(Romania) Filip Ugran	17	1	0	2	8th	3rd	168
2020	Tatuus F4-T014	(Poland) Piotr Wiśnicki	15	0	0	0	19th	3rd	168
2020	Tatuus F4-T014	(Italy) Francesco Braschi	10	0	0	0	35th	3rd	168
2020	Tatuus F4-T014	(Mexico) Santiago Ramos	11	0	0	0	16th	3rd	168
2020	Tatuus F4-T014	(Italy) Francesco Simonazzi	20	0	0	0	18th (Note: Simonazzi also raced with DRZ Benelli and BVM Racing)	3rd	168
2021	Tatuus F4-T014	(Italy) Francesco Braschi	20	0	0	1	16th	6th	63
2021	Tatuus F4-T014	(Mexico) Santiago Ramos	15	0	0	0	22nd	6th	63
2021	Tatuus F4-T014	(Poland) Piotr Wiśnicki	21	0	0	0	23rd	6th	63
2021	Tatuus F4-T014	(Switzerland) Samir Ben	21	0	0	0	27th	6th	63
2021	Tatuus F4-T014	(Mexico) Jorge Garciarce	21	0	0	0	34th	6th	63
2022	Tatuus F4-T421	(Germany) Valentin Kluss	17	0	0	0	21st	8th	4
2022	Tatuus F4-T421	(Ukraine) Oleksandr Partyshev	14	0	0	0	37th	8th	4
2022	Tatuus F4-T421	(Switzerland) Ethan Ischer	20	0	0	0	40th	8th	4
2022	Tatuus F4-T421	(Thailand) Nandhavud Bhirombhakdi	8	0	0	0	41st	8th	4
2023	Tatuus F4-T421	(Israel) Ariel Elkin	21	0	0	0	17th	7th	16.5
2023	Tatuus F4-T421	(South Korea) Kim Hwarang	15	0	0	0	27th	7th	16.5
2023	Tatuus F4-T421	(Switzerland) Ethan Ischer	21	0	0	0	29th	7th	16.5
2023	Tatuus F4-T421	(Australia) Griffin Peebles‡	6	0	0	0	33rd	7th	16.5
2023	Tatuus F4-T421	(Germany) Finn Wiebelhaus†	9	0	0	0	36th	7th	16.5
2023	Tatuus F4-T421	(China) Shimo Zhang	3	0	0	0	43rd	7th	16.5
2024	Tatuus F4-T421	(Netherlands) Reno Francot	21	0	0	0	14th	4th	68
2024	Tatuus F4-T421	(Switzerland) Ethan Ischer	18	0	0	1	15th	4th	68
2024	Tatuus F4-T421	(Switzerland) Enea Frey	21	0	0	0	16th	4th	68
2024	Tatuus F4-T421	(Italy) Shimo Zhang	9	0	0	0	33rd	4th	68
2024	Tatuus F4-T421	(United Kingdom) Bart Harrison	3	0	0	0	37th	4th	68
2024	Tatuus F4-T421	(Brazil) Ciro Sobral	3	0	0	0	46th	4th	68
2024	Tatuus F4-T421	(Austria) Oscar Wurz	3	0	0	0	47th	4th	68
2024	Tatuus F4-T421	(Slovakia) Matúš Ryba	3	0	0	0	50th	4th	68
2025	Tatuus F4-T421	(Kyrgyzstan) Artem Severiukhin	20	0	0	0	13th	5th	104
2025	Tatuus F4-T421	(United Kingdom) Bart Harrison	20	0	0	0	14th	5th	104
2025	Tatuus F4-T421	(Switzerland) Enea Frey	14	0	0	0	20th	5th	104
2025	Tatuus F4-T421	(Argentina) Teo Schropp	20	0	0	0	25th	5th	104
2025	Tatuus F4-T421	(Mexico) Javier Herrera	4	0	0	0	28th	5th	104
2025	Tatuus F4-T421	(Qatar) Bader Al Sulaiti	20	0	0	0	29th	5th	104
2025	Tatuus F4-T421	(Mexico) Nicolás Cortés	3	0	0	0	41st	5th	104
2026	Tatuus F4-T421	(Qatar) Bader Al Sulaiti	9	0	0	0	16th*	3rd*	162*
2026	Tatuus F4-T421	(Germany) Elia Weiss	6	0	0	0	17th*	3rd*	162*
2026	Tatuus F4-T421	(Switzerland) Levi Arn	9	0	0	1	23rd*	3rd*	162*
2026	Tatuus F4-T421	(Kyrgyzstan) Artem Severiukhin	3	0	0	0	27th*	3rd*	162*
2026	Tatuus F4-T421	(Mexico) Nicolás Cortés	8	0	0	0	37th*	3rd*	162*
2026	Tatuus F4-T421	(Switzerland) Georgy Zasov	2	0	0	0	50th*	3rd*	162*

†Wiebelhaus drove for AS Motorsport in round 1.

‡Peebles drove for AKM Motorsport in round 1.

*Season still in progress

=== Formula 4 CEZ Championship ===
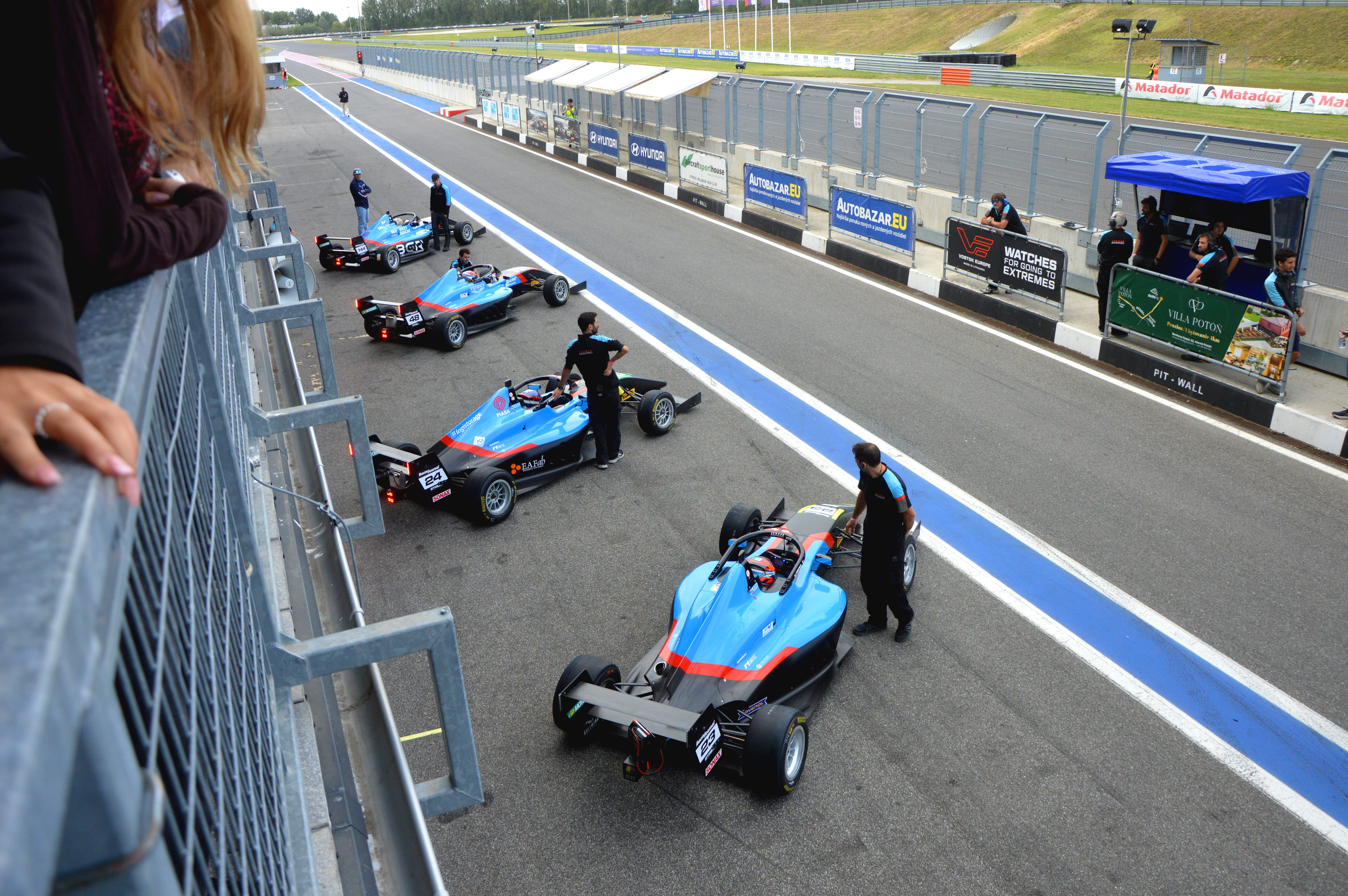
Jenzer Motorsport's garages and pit wall, F4 CEZ Slovakiaring (2025)

Year	Car	Drivers	Races	Wins	Poles	Fast laps	D.C.	T.C.	Points
2023	Tatuus F4-T421	(Switzerland) Ethan Ischer	14	8	5	7	1st	1st	549
2023	Tatuus F4-T421	(Netherlands) Reno Francot	14	2	1	0	3rd	1st	549
2023	Tatuus F4-T421	(Denmark) Mathias Bjerre Jakobsen	9	0	0	0	5th	1st	549
2023	Tatuus F4-T421	(Czech Republic) Max Karhan	8	0	0	0	7th	1st	549
2023	Tatuus F4-T421	(Jamaica) Thomas Gore	3	0	0	0	10th	1st	549
2023	Tatuus F4-T421	(Italy) Shimo Zhang	3	0	0	0	12th	1st	549
2024	Tatuus F4-T421	(Austria) Oscar Wurz	18	2	1	6	1st	1st	599
2024	Tatuus F4-T421	(Czech Republic) Max Karhan	18	4	0	3	3rd	1st	599
2024	Tatuus F4-T421	(China) Shimo Zhang†	6	0	0	1	13th	1st	599
2024	Tatuus F4-T421	(Switzerland) Enea Frey	3	0	0	0	15th	1st	599
2024	Tatuus F4-T421	(Serbia) Andrija Kostić	6	0	0	0	19th	1st	599
2024	Tatuus F4-T421	(Czech Republic) Teodor Borenstein	3	0	0	0	26th	1st	599
2024	Tatuus F4-T421	(Slovakia) Matúš Ryba	3	0	0	0	27th	1st	599
2024	Tatuus F4-T421	(Switzerland) Ethan Ischer	6	2	1	1	NC	1st	599
2025	Tatuus F4-T421	(Argentina) Gino Trappa	18	6	3	5	1st	1st	687
2025	Tatuus F4-T421	(Czech Republic) Max Karhan	18	2	0	2	2nd	1st	687
2025	Tatuus F4-T421	(Mexico) Javier Herrera	18	3	1	1	3rd	1st	687
2025	Tatuus F4-T421	(Mexico) Nicolas Cortes	18	0	1	1	4th	1st	687
2025	Tatuus F4-T421	(United Kingdom) Bart Harrison	3	2	1	1	10th	1st	687
2025	Tatuus F4-T421	(Argentina) Teo Schropp	3	0	0	0	19th	1st	687
2025	Tatuus F4-T421	(Argentina) Bautista Acosta	3	0	0	0	21st	1st	687
2025	Tatuus F4-T421	(Switzerland) Florentin Hattemer	3	0	0	0	25th	1st	687
2026	Tatuus F4-T421	(Czech Republic) Teo Borenstein							
2026	Tatuus F4-T421	(Czech Republic) Ella Häkkinen							
2026	Tatuus F4-T421	(Germany) Elia Weiss							
2026	Tatuus F4-T421	(Switzerland) Georgiy Zasov							
2026	Tatuus F4-T421	(Lithuania) Markas Šilkūnas							
2026	Tatuus F4-T421	(Czech Republic) Max Karhan							

†Zhang drove for BVM Racing in round 2.

=== Formula Winter Series ===
Year	Car	Drivers	Races	Wins	Poles	Fast laps	Points	D.C.	T.C.	Points
2023	Tatuus F4-T421	(South Korea) Kim Hwarang	4	0	0	0	36	7th	N/A	
2023	Tatuus F4-T421	(Switzerland) Ethan Ischer	4	0	0	0	26	11th	N/A	
2024	Tatuus F4-T421	(Hungary) Ádám Hideg	11	0	1	0	10	20th	7th	10
2024	Tatuus F4-T421	(Switzerland) Enea Frey	11	0	0	0	4	25th	7th	10
2024	Tatuus F4-T421	(France) Arthur Dorison	11	0	0	0	0	31st	7th	10
2024	Tatuus F4-T421	(France) Édouard Borgna	11	0	0	0	0	43rd	7th	10
2025	Tatuus F4-T421	(United Kingdom) Bart Harrison	12	0	0	0	68	7th	3rd	150
2025	Tatuus F4-T421	(Switzerland) Enea Frey	12	0	0	0	54	9th	3rd	150
2025	Tatuus F4-T421	(United Kingdom) Artem Severiukhin	12	0	0	1	42	10th	3rd	150
2025	Tatuus F4-T421	(Denmark) Alba Larsen	9	0	0	0	0	34th	3rd	150
2025	Tatuus F4-T421	(Mexico) Javier Herrera	3	0	0	0	0	40th	3rd	150
2026	Tatuus F4-T421	(Switzerland) Levi Arn	15	0	0	0	47	12th	4th	73
2026	Tatuus F4-T421	(Czech Republic) Teodor Borenstein	15	0	0	0	26	15th	4th	73
2026	Tatuus F4-T421	(Lithuania) Markas Šilkūnas	15	0	0	0	0	33th	4th	73
2026	Tatuus F4-T421	(Switzerland) Georgiy Zasov	9	0	0	0	0	36th	4th	73
2026	Tatuus F4-T421	(Mexico) Nicolás Cortés	6	0	0	0	0	37th	4th	73

=== Euro 4 Championship ===
Year	Car	Drivers	Races	Wins	Poles	Fast laps	Points	D.C.	T.C.	Points
2024	Tatuus F4-T421	(Switzerland) Ethan Ischer	9	0	0	0	23	13th	5th	27
2024	Tatuus F4-T421	(Switzerland) Enea Frey	9	0	0	0	4	17th	5th	27
2024	Tatuus F4-T421	(Netherlands) Reno Francot	3	0	0	0	0	27th	5th	27
2025	Tatuus F4-T421	(Switzerland) Enea Frey	3	0	0	0	8	14th	6th	11
2025	Tatuus F4-T421	(Germany) Elia Weiss†	6	0	0	0	2	20th	6th	11
2025	Tatuus F4-T421	(United Kingdom) Bart Harrison	3	0	0	0	1	22nd	6th	11
2025	Tatuus F4-T421	(Qatar) Bader Al Sulaiti	9	0	0	0	0	26th	6th	11
2025	Tatuus F4-T421	(Argentina) Teo Schropp	7	0	0	0	0	30th	6th	11
2025	Tatuus F4-T421	(Mexico) Nicolás Cortés	3	0	0	0	0	41st	6th	11

† Weiss drove for Cram Motorsport in round 2.

=== BOSS GP Series ===
Year	Car	Drivers	Races	Wins	Poles	Fast laps	Points	D.C.
2016	Dallara T08	(Switzerland) "Luke Skywalker"	2	0	0	0	6	28th
2016	Dallara T08	(Switzerland) Thierry Christen	2	0	0	0	18	25th
2016	Dallara SN01	(Switzerland) Martin Kindler	6	0	0	0	39	19th
2017	Dallara SN01	(Switzerland) Martin Kindler	4	0	0	0	51	12th
2024	Dallara GP2/11	(Switzerland) Martin Kindler						

== Former series results ==
=== GP3 Series ===
Year	Car	Drivers	Races	Wins	Poles	Fast laps	D.C.	T.C.	Points
2010	Dallara GP3/10-Renault	(Switzerland) Nico Müller	16	2	1	2	**3rd**	**3rd**	**67**
2010	Dallara GP3/10-Renault	(Norway) Pål Varhaug	16	1	0	0	13th	**3rd**	**67**
2010	Dallara GP3/10-Renault	(Switzerland) Simon Trummer	14	0	0	0	25th	**3rd**	**67**
2010	Dallara GP3/10-Renault	(Spain) Marco Barba	2	0	0	0	35th	**3rd**	**67**
2011	Dallara GP3/10-Renault	(Switzerland) Nico Müller	16	1	0	0	4th	7th	37
2011	Dallara GP3/10-Renault	(Switzerland) Alex Fontana	2	0	0	0	24th	7th	37
2011	Dallara GP3/10-Renault	(Italy) Vittorio Ghirelli	12	0	0	0	25th	7th	37
2011	Dallara GP3/10-Renault	(Russia) Maxim Zimin	16	0	0	0	27th	7th	37
2011	Dallara GP3/10-Renault	(Switzerland) Christophe Hurni	2	0	0	0	36th	7th	37
2012	Dallara GP3/10-Renault	(Switzerland) Patric Niederhauser	16	2	0	1	7th	4th	133.5
2012	Dallara GP3/10-Renault	(Romania) Robert Visoiu	16	0	0	0	14th	4th	133.5
2012	Dallara GP3/10-Renault	(Switzerland) Alex Fontana	4	0	0	0	18th	4th	133.5
2012	Dallara GP3/10-Renault	(Argentina) Facu Regalia	2	0	0	0	27th	4th	133.5
2012	Dallara GP3/10-Renault	(Czech Republic) Jakub Klášterka	4	0	0	0	31st	4th	133.5
2013	Dallara GP3/13-Renault	(Switzerland) Patric Niederhauser	16	0	0	0	13th	7th	51
2013	Dallara GP3/13-Renault	(Switzerland) Alex Fontana	16	0	0	0	17th	7th	51
2013	Dallara GP3/13-Renault	(Venezuela) Samin Gómez	16	0	0	0	26th	7th	51
2014	Dallara GP3/13-Renault	(Switzerland) Mathéo Tuscher	18	0	0	0	12th	7th	61
2014	Dallara GP3/13-Renault	(Italy) Kevin Ceccon	8	0	0	0	15th	7th	61
2014	Dallara GP3/13-Renault	(Norway) Pål Varhaug	18	0	0	0	17th	7th	61
2014	Dallara GP3/13-Renault	(Hong Kong) Adderly Fong	8	0	0	0	24th	7th	61
2014	Dallara GP3/13-Renault	(Austria) Christopher Höher	2	0	0	0	36th	7th	61
2015	Dallara GP3/13-Renault	(Switzerland) Ralph Boschung	18	0	0	0	11th	6th	55
2015	Dallara GP3/13-Renault	(Switzerland) Mathéo Tuscher	18	0	0	0	13th	6th	55
2015	Dallara GP3/13-Renault	(Norway) Pål Varhaug	18	0	0	0	19th	6th	55
2016	Dallara GP3/16-Mecachrome	(India) Arjun Maini	14	0	0	50	10th	6th	68
2016	Dallara GP3/16-Mecachrome	(Colombia) Oscar Tunjo	6	0	1	18	16th	6th	68
2016	Dallara GP3/16-Mecachrome	(Italy) Alessio Lorandi	4	0	0	0	23rd	6th	68
2016	Dallara GP3/16-Mecachrome	(Malaysia) Akash Nandy	18	0	0	0	24th	6th	68
2016	Dallara GP3/16-Mecachrome	(Slovakia) Richard Gonda	6	0	0	0	25th	6th	68
2017	Dallara GP3/16-Mecachrome	(Italy) Alessio Lorandi	15	1	0	0	6th	**3rd**	**164**
2017	Dallara GP3/16-Mecachrome	(India) Arjun Maini	15	1	0	0	9th	**3rd**	**164**
2017	Dallara GP3/16-Mecachrome	(United States) Juan Manuel Correa	5	0	0	0	22nd	**3rd**	**164**
2018	Dallara GP3/16-Mecachrome	(Germany) David Beckmann	18	3	2	2	5th (Note: Shared results with other team)	5th	65
2018	Dallara GP3/16-Mecachrome	(United States) Juan Manuel Correa	18	0	0	0	12th	5th	65
2018	Dallara GP3/16-Mecachrome	(Colombia) Tatiana Calderón	18	0	0	0	16th	5th	65
2018	Dallara GP3/16-Mecachrome	(Germany) Jannes Fittje	10	0	0	0	20th	5th	65

==== In detail ====
(key) (Races in bold indicate pole position) (Races in italics indicate fastest lap)

Year	Chassis Engine Tyres	Drivers	1	2	3	4	5	6	7	8	9	10	11	12	13	14	15	16	17	18	T.C.	Points
2010	GP3/10; Renault; **P**		CAT; FEA	CAT; SPR	IST; FEA	IST; SPR	VAL; FEA	VAL; SPR	SIL; FEA	SIL; SPR	HOC; FEA	HOC; SPR	HUN; FEA	HUN; SPR	SPA; FEA	SPA; SPR	MNZ; FEA	MNZ; SPR			3rd	67
2010	GP3/10; Renault; **P**	(Norway) Pål Varhaug	1	Ret	15	18	11	8	14	9	12	Ret	17	23	15	17	14	19			3rd	67
2010	GP3/10; Renault; **P**	(Switzerland) Simon Trummer	6	8	20	13	13	27	17	12	11	Ret			8	Ret	Ret	24			3rd	67
2010	GP3/10; Renault; **P**	(Spain) Marco Barba											Ret	19							3rd	67
2010	GP3/10; Renault; **P**	(Switzerland) Nico Müller	13	9	6	4	7	1	3	4	Ret	17	**1**	6	4	6	4	3			3rd	67
2011	GP3/10; Renault; **P**		IST; FEA	IST; SPR	CAT; FEA	CAT; SPR	VAL; FEA	VAL; SPR	SIL; FEA	SIL; SPR	NÜR; FEA	NÜR; SPR	HUN; FEA	HUN; SPR	SPA; FEA	SPA; SPR	MNZ; FEA	MNZ; SPR			7th	37
2011	GP3/10; Renault; **P**	(Switzerland) Nico Müller	11	15	5	Ret	Ret	14	1	11	15	7	4	5	7	3	4	3			7th	37
2011	GP3/10; Renault; **P**	(Russia) Maxim Zimin	23	17	Ret	19	Ret	21^{†}	DSQ	EX	20	15	19	8	Ret	15	Ret	16			7th	37
2011	GP3/10; Renault; **P**	(Italy) Vittorio Ghirelli	25	Ret	9	8	13	9	14	22	13	11	22	Ret							7th	37
2011	GP3/10; Renault; **P**	(Switzerland) Alex Fontana													14	6					7th	37
2011	GP3/10; Renault; **P**	(Switzerland) Christophe Hurni															16	20			7th	37
2012	GP3/10; Renault; **P**		CAT; FEA	CAT; SPR	MON; FEA	MON; SPR	VAL; FEA	VAL; SPR	SIL; FEA	SIL; SPR	HOC; FEA	HOC; SPR	HUN; FEA	HUN; SPR	SPA; FEA	SPA; SPR	MNZ; FEA	MNZ; SPR			4th	133.5
2012	GP3/10; Renault; **P**	(Romania) Robert Visoiu	8	2	14	10	Ret	12	12	5	DSQ	12	12	22	15	13	14	7			4th	133.5
2012	GP3/10; Renault; **P**	(Switzerland) Patric Niederhauser	4	5	Ret	15	8	1	10	3	1	9	16	2	11	6	5	Ret			4th	133.5
2012	GP3/10; Renault; **P**	(Czech Republic) Jakub Klášterka	19	14	22	19															4th	133.5
2012	GP3/10; Renault; **P**	(Argentina) Facu Regalia							14	12											4th	133.5
2012	GP3/10; Renault; **P**	(Switzerland) Alex Fontana											17	15	10	4					4th	133.5
2013	GP3/13; AER; **P**		CAT; FEA	CAT; SPR	VAL; FEA	VAL; SPR	SIL; FEA	SIL; SPR	NÜR; FEA	NÜR; SPR	HUN; FEA	HUN; SPR	SPA; FEA	SPA; SPR	MNZ; FEA	MNZ; SPR	YMC; FEA	YMC; SPR			7th	51
2013	GP3/13; AER; **P**	(Venezuela) Samin Gómez	16	13	Ret	19	20	18	18	19	19	14	16	Ret	17	15	22	25			7th	51
2013	GP3/13; AER; **P**	(Switzerland) Patric Niederhauser	2	3	13	Ret	15	11	12	8	25	15	Ret	9	8	Ret	Ret	15			7th	51
2013	GP3/13; AER; **P**	(Switzerland) Alex Fontana	10	9	14	11	7	3	Ret	17	10	19	21	12	Ret	Ret	13	10			7th	51
2014	GP3/13; AER; **P**		CAT; FEA	CAT; SPR	RBR; FEA	RBR; SPR	SIL; FEA	SIL; SPR	HOC; FEA	HOC; SPR	HUN; FEA	HUN; SPR	SPA; FEA	SPA; SPR	MNZ; FEA	MNZ; SPR	SOC; FEA	SOC; SPR	YMC; FEA	YMC; SPR	7th	61
2014	GP3/13; AER; **P**	(Norway) Pål Varhaug	12	Ret	13	9	11	Ret	19	Ret	21	14	5	8	Ret	11	10	Ret	14	9	7th	61
2014	GP3/13; AER; **P**	(Switzerland) Mathéo Tuscher	8	2	6	Ret	14	8	18	11	22	15	Ret	16	8	Ret	Ret	11	Ret	10	7th	61
2014	GP3/13; AER; **P**	(Hong Kong) Adderly Fong	Ret	12	Ret	15	21	11	15	12											7th	61
2014	GP3/13; AER; **P**	(Austria) Christopher Höher									23	23									7th	61
2014	GP3/13; AER; **P**	(Italy) Kevin Ceccon											11	11	12	6	5	Ret	9	6	7th	61
2015	GP3/13; AER; **P**		CAT; FEA	CAT; SPR	RBR; FEA	RBR; SPR	SIL; FEA	SIL; SPR	HUN; FEA	HUN; SPR	SPA; FEA	SPA; SPR	MNZ; FEA	MNZ; SPR	SOC; FEA	SOC; SPR	BHR; FEA	BHR; SPR	YMC; FEA	YMC; SPR	6th	55
2015	GP3/13; AER; **P**	(Norway) Pål Varhaug	21	18	11	Ret	16	19	9	7	Ret	10	Ret	14	Ret	14	Ret	Ret	11	8	6th	55
2015	GP3/13; AER; **P**	(Switzerland) Mathéo Tuscher	14	13	12	DSQ	10	9	10	9	Ret	4	6	6	Ret	Ret	12	Ret	16	14	6th	55
2015	GP3/13; AER; **P**	(Switzerland) Ralph Boschung	Ret	14	8	8	8	3	13	8	9	8	9	7	11	DNS	10	9	12	11	6th	55
2016	GP3/16; Mecachrome; **P**		CAT; FEA	CAT; SPR	RBR; FEA	RBR; SPR	SIL; FEA	SIL; SPR	HUN; FEA	HUN; SPR	HOC; FEA	HOC; SPR	SPA; FEA	SPA; SPR	MNZ; FEA	MNZ; SPR	SEP; FEA	SEP; SPR	YMC; FEA	YMC; SPR	6th	68
2016	GP3/16; Mecachrome; **P**	(Malaysia) Akash Nandy	21	23	12	Ret	19	21	17	Ret	13	16	16	13	15	18	Ret	18	13	13	6th	68
2016	GP3/16; Mecachrome; **P**	(Slovakia) Richard Gonda	13	17	19	Ret			13	15											6th	68
2016	GP3/16; Mecachrome; **P**	(Italy) Alessio Lorandi															11	9	12	20	6th	68
2016	GP3/16; Mecachrome; **P**	(Colombia) Oscar Tunjo	8	2	14	13							15	DNS							6th	68
2016	GP3/16; Mecachrome; **P**	(India) Arjun Maini					8	19	8	2	7	5	Ret	16	14	6	4	7	14	14	6th	68
2017	GP3/16; Mecachrome; **P**		CAT; FEA	CAT; SPR	RBR; FEA	RBR; SPR	SIL; FEA	SIL; SPR	HUN; FEA	HUN; SPR	SPA; FEA	SPA; SPR	MNZ; FEA	MNZ; SPR	JER; FEA	JER; SPR	YMC; FEA	YMC; SPR			3rd	167
2017	GP3/16; Mecachrome; **P**	(Italy) Alessio Lorandi	3	3	7	8	3	6	4	Ret	12	14	Ret	C	8	1	5	17			3rd	167
2017	GP3/16; Mecachrome; **P**	(Italy) Juan Manuel Correa									15	Ret	Ret	C	15	16	12	12			3rd	167
2017	GP3/16; Mecachrome; **P**	(India) Arjun Maini	7	1	10	16	6	5	Ret	8	4	6	16^{†}	C	17	12	3	6			3rd	167
2018	GP3/16; Mecachrome; **P**		CAT; FEA	CAT; SPR	LEC; FEA	LEC; SPR	RBR; FEA	RBR; SPR	SIL; FEA	SIL; SPR	HUN; FEA	HUN; SPR	SPA; FEA	SPA; SPR	MNZ; FEA	MNZ; SPR	SOC; FEA	SOC; SPR	YMC; FEA	YMC; SPR	5th	65
2018	GP3/16; Mecachrome; **P**	(Colombia) Tatiana Calderón	Ret	Ret	17	16	12	12	Ret	10	11	8	10	9	15	6	10	7	10	8	5th	65
2018	GP3/16; Mecachrome; **P**	(United States) Juan Manuel Correa	8	4	9	12	19	13	Ret	15	7	5	11	10	17	Ret	9	5	8	6	5th	65
2018	GP3/16; Mecachrome; **P**	(Germany) David Beckmann	6	17	18	10	8	Ret	14	Ret											5th	65
2018	GP3/16; Mecachrome; **P**	(Germany) Jannes Fittje									13	17	20	15	16	11	12	10	13	Ret	5th	65

=== FIA Formula 3 Championship ===
Year	Chassis	Engine	Tyres	Drivers	Races	Wins	Poles	F. Laps	Podiums	D.C.	Pts	T.C.	Pts
2019	Dallara; F3 2019	Mecachrome; V634 V6	P	(Japan) Yuki Tsunoda	16	1	0	0	3	9th	67	7th	67
2019	Dallara; F3 2019	Mecachrome; V634 V6	P	(Russia) Artem Petrov	2	0	0	0	0	31st	0	7th	67
2019	Dallara; F3 2019	Mecachrome; V634 V6	P	(Switzerland) Giorgio Carrara	8	0	0	0	0	30th	0	7th	67
2019	Dallara; F3 2019	Mecachrome; V634 V6	P	(Italy) Federico Malvestiti	2	0	0	0	0	34th	0	7th	67
2019	Dallara; F3 2019	Mecachrome; V634 V6	P	(Macau) Hon Chio Leong	2	0	0	0	0	33rd	0	7th	67
2019	Dallara; F3 2019	Mecachrome; V634 V6	P	(Germany) Andreas Estner	16	0	0	0	0	26th	0	7th	67
2020	Dallara; F3 2019	Mecachrome; V634 V6	P	(Australia) Calan Williams	18	0	0	0	0	31st	0	9th	11
2020	Dallara; F3 2019	Mecachrome; V634 V6	P	(Italy) Federico Malvestiti	18	0	0	0	0	30th	0	9th	11
2020	Dallara; F3 2019	Mecachrome; V634 V6	P	(Italy) Matteo Nannini	18	0	0	0	1	18th	11	9th	11
2021	Dallara; F3 2019	Mecachrome; V634 V6	P	(Australia) Calan Williams	20	0	0	0	1	19th	15	9th	29
2021	Dallara; F3 2019	Mecachrome; V634 V6	P	(France) Pierre-Louis Chovet	3	0	0	0	0	30th	0	9th	29
2021	Dallara; F3 2019	Mecachrome; V634 V6	P	(United Kingdom) Johnathan Hoggard	17	0	0	0	0	20th	14	9th	29
2021	Dallara; F3 2019	Mecachrome; V634 V6	P	(Romania) Filip Ugran	20	0	0	0	0	31st	0	9th	29
2022	Dallara; F3 2019	Mecachrome; V634 V6	P	(Israel) Ido Cohen	18	0	0	0	0	26th	2	9th	26
2022	Dallara; F3 2019	Mecachrome; V634 V6	P	(Finland) Niko Kari	2	0	0	0	0	30th	0	9th	26
2022	Dallara; F3 2019	Mecachrome; V634 V6	P	(Italy) Federico Malvestiti	16	0	0	0	0	29th	0	9th	26
2022	Dallara; F3 2019	Mecachrome; V634 V6	P	(Finland) William Alatalo	18	0	0	0	0	18th	24	9th	26
2023	Dallara; F3 2019	Mecachrome; V634 V6	P	(Italy) Nikita Bedrin	18	0	0	0	2	18th	24	6th	108
2023	Dallara; F3 2019	Mecachrome; V634 V6	P	(United Kingdom) Taylor Barnard	18	1	0	0	3	10th	72	6th	108
2023	Dallara; F3 2019	Mecachrome; V634 V6	P	(Mexico) Alex García	18	0	0	0	0	20th	12	6th	108
2024	Dallara; F3 2019	Mecachrome; V634 V6	P	(Austria) Charlie Wurz	20	0	0	0	0	22nd	10	10th	29
2024	Dallara; F3 2019	Mecachrome; V634 V6	P	(United States) Max Esterson	20	0	0	0	0	21st	11	10th	29
2024	Dallara; F3 2019	Mecachrome; V634 V6	P	(Peru) Matías Zagazeta	18	0	0	0	1	25th	8	10th	29
2024	Dallara; F3 2019	Mecachrome; V634 V6	P	(United Kingdom) James Hedley	2	0	0	0	0	34th	0	10th	29

==== In detail ====
(key) (Races in bold indicate pole position) (Races in italics indicate fastest lap)

Year	Drivers	1	2	3	4	5	6	7	8	9	10	11	12	13	14	15	16	17	18	19	20	21	T.C.	Points
2019		CAT; FEA	CAT; SPR	LEC; FEA	LEC; SPR	RBR; FEA	RBR; SPR	SIL; FEA	SIL; SPR	HUN; FEA	HUN; SPR	SPA; FEA	SPA; SPR	MNZ; FEA	MNZ; SPR	SOC; FEA	SOC; SPR						7th	67
2019	(Japan) Yuki Tsunoda	10	9	7	9	16	11	14	7	9	6	6	2	3	1	12	25†						7th	67
2019	(Russia) Artem Petrov	18	Ret																				7th	67
2019	(Switzerland) Giorgio Carrara					28	21			25	21	16	Ret	Ret	23								7th	67
2019	(Italy) Federico Malvestiti							Ret	23														7th	67
2019	(Macau) Hon Chio Leong															Ret	21						7th	67
2019	(Germany) Andreas Estner	25	22	11	11	23	20	23	22	21	15	23	17	22	24	24	18						7th	67
2020		RBR; FEA	RBR; SPR	RBR; FEA	RBR; SPR	HUN; FEA	HUN; SPR	SIL; FEA	SIL; SPR	SIL; FEA	SIL; SPR	CAT; FEA	CAT; SPR	SPA; FEA	SPA; SPR	MNZ; FEA	MNZ; SPR	MUG; FEA	MUG; SPR				9th	11
2020	(Australia) Calan Williams	21	14	25	23	Ret	15	14	14	Ret	Ret	25	14	16	25	25	18	19	21				9th	11
2020	(Italy) Federico Malvestiti	19	21	28	22	13	Ret	19	13	Ret	23	26	Ret	18	24	22	14	18	22				9th	11
2020	(Italy) Matteo Nannini	27	18	23	NC	22	24†	24	23	27†	16	10	3	13	26	Ret	20	16	15				9th	11
2021		CAT; SP1	CAT; SP2	CAT; FEA	LEC; SP1	LEC; SP2	LEC; FEA	RBR; SP1	RBR; SP2	RBR; FEA	HUN; SP1	HUN; SP2	HUN; FEA	SPA; SP1	SPA; SP2	SPA; FEA	ZAN; SP1	ZAN; SP2	ZAN; FEA	SOC; SP1	SOC; SP2	SOC; FEA	9th	29
2021	(Australia) Calan Williams	18	11	21	3	8	12	16	15	9	17	24	17	24	Ret	18	16	22	18	19	C	12	9th	29
2021	(France) Pierre-Louis Chovet	24	14	24																			9th	29
2021	(United Kingdom) Johnathan Hoggard				Ret	26	18	18	10	25	22	22	18	6	25	16	Ret	19	20	12	C	6	9th	29
2021	(Romania) Filip Ugran	25	21	27	23	28	26	24	22	23	25	19	22	28†	19	25	15	24	19	25	C	19	9th	29
2022		BHR; SPR	BHR; FEA	IMO; SPR	IMO; FEA	CAT; SPR	CAT; FEA	SIL; SPR	SIL; FEA	RBR; SPR	RBR; FEA	HUN; SPR	HUN; FEA	SPA; SPR	SPA; FEA	ZAN; SPR	ZAN; FEA	MNZ; SPR	MNZ; FEA				9th	26
2022	(Israel) Ido Cohen	14	15	23	13	23	22	17	15	14	9	Ret	17	24†	Ret	29	16	15	12				9th	26
2022	(Finland) Niko Kari	26	14																				9th	26
2022	(Italy) Federico Malvestiti			Ret	21	19	22	25	13	21	26	25	25	18	26	24	20	16	18				9th	26
2022	(Finland) William Alatalo	11	9	15	10	15	12	19	16	Ret	8	16	16	6	7	30	Ret	14	7				9th	26
2023		BHR; SPR	BHR; FEA	ALB; SPR	ALB; FEA	MCO; SPR	MCO; FEA	CAT; SPR	CAT; FEA	RBR; SPR	RBR; FEA	SIL; SPR	SIL; FEA	HUN; SPR	HUN; FEA	SPA; SPR	SPA; FEA	MNZ; SPR	MNZ; FEA				6th	108
2023	(Italy) Nikita Bedrin	16	17	15	23†	15	12	10	11	25	13	18	17	3	23	11	3	15	Ret				6th	108
2023	(United Kingdom) Taylor Barnard	14	16	12	9	5	8	9	9	27	12	30	21	11	14	2	1	4	3				6th	108
2023	(Mexico) Alex García	27	29†	Ret	20	26	21	22	22	Ret	23	11	26	27†	26	18	4	17	21				6th	108
2024		BHR; SPR	BHR; FEA	ALB; SPR	ALB; FEA	IMO; SPR	IMO; FEA	MCO; SPR	MCO; FEA	CAT; SPR	CAT; FEA	RBR; SPR	RBR; FEA	SIL; SPR	SIL; FEA	HUN; SPR	HUN; FEA	SPA; SPR	SPA; FEA	MNZ; SPR	MNZ; FEA		10th	29
2024	(Austria) Charlie Wurz	19	16	11	5	23	24	19	Ret	16	13	20	27	Ret	Ret	17	Ret	26	23	24†	14		10th	29
2024	(United States) Max Esterson	6	24	26	14	18	21	14	17	22	23	18	17	Ret	18	16	15	Ret	7	Ret	Ret		10th	29
2024	(Peru) Matías Zagazeta	Ret	18	15	17	17	17			19	19	17	14	3	22	Ret	27†	17	17	14	Ret		10th	29
2024	(United Kingdom) James Hedley							20	22														10th	29

=== ADAC Formula 4 ===
Year	Car	Drivers	Races	Wins	Poles	Fast laps	D.C.	T.C.	Points
2015	Tatuus F4-T014	(Germany) Marek Böckmann	24	0	0	0	17th	N/A	N/A
2015	Tatuus F4-T014	(Switzerland) Moritz Müller-Crepon	24	0	0	0	29th	N/A	N/A
2015	Tatuus F4-T014	(Germany) Arlind Hoti	9	0	0	0	32nd	N/A	N/A
2015	Tatuus F4-T014	(Germany) David Kolkmann	21	0	0	0	34th	N/A	N/A
2015	Tatuus F4-T014	(Switzerland) Nico Rindlisbacher	6	0	0	0	43rd	N/A	N/A
2016	Tatuus F4-T014	(Switzerland) Fabio Scherer	24	1	0	0	17th	8th	34
2016	Tatuus F4-T014	(Netherlands) Job van Uitert	24	0	0	0	20th	8th	34
2016	Tatuus F4-T014	(Estonia) Jan-Erik Meikup	21	0	0	0	23rd	8th	34
2016	Tatuus F4-T014	(Germany) Kevin Kratz	21	0	0	0	33rd	8th	34
2016	Tatuus F4-T014	(Argentina) Diego Ciantini	9	0	0	0	36th	8th	34
2016	Tatuus F4-T014	(Switzerland) Giacomo Bianchi	6	0	0	0	44th	8th	34
2017	Tatuus F4-T014	(Netherlands) Job van Uitert	3	0	0	0	NC (Note: Ineligible for the position in the championship)	N/A	N/A
2017	Tatuus F4-T014	(India) Kush Maini	3	0	0	0	NC	N/A	N/A
2018	Tatuus F4-T014	(Switzerland) Grégoire Saucy	3	0	0	0	NC	N/A	N/A
2018	Tatuus F4-T014	(Italy) Federico Malvestiti	3	0	0	0	NC	N/A	N/A
2018	Tatuus F4-T014	(Argentina) Giorgio Carrara	3	0	0	0	NC	N/A	N/A
2019	Tatuus F4-T014	(Switzerland) Axel Gnos	5	0	0	0	NC	N/A	N/A
2019	Tatuus F4-T014	(United Kingdom) Jonny Edgar	5	0	0	0	NC	N/A	N/A
2019	Tatuus F4-T014	(Argentina) Giorgio Carrara	5	0	0	0	NC	N/A	N/A
2021	Tatuus F4-T014	(Italy) Francesco Braschi	6	0	0	0	NC	N/A	N/A
2021	Tatuus F4-T014	(Mexico) Jorge Garciarce	6	0	0	0	NC	N/A	N/A
2021	Tatuus F4-T014	(Switzerland) Samir Ben	3	0	0	0	NC	N/A	N/A
2022	Tatuus F4-T421	(Finland) Rasmus Joutsimies	18	0	0	0	8th	**3rd**	**276**
2022	Tatuus F4-T421	(Thailand) Nandhavud Bhirombhakdi	15	0	0	0	14th	**3rd**	**276**
2022	Tatuus F4-T421	(Switzerland) Samir Ben	12	0	0	0	18th	**3rd**	**276**
2022	Tatuus F4-T421	(Switzerland) Ethan Ischer	3	0	0	0	NC†	**3rd**	**276**
2022	Tatuus F4-T421	(Ukraine) Oleksandr Partyshev	3	0	0	0	NC†	**3rd**	**276**

=== Spanish F4 Championship ===
Year	Car	Drivers	Races	Wins	Poles	Fast laps	Points	D.C.	T.C.
2019	Tatuus F4-T014	(Argentina) Giorgio Carrara	3	3	0	1	55	11th	5th
2019	Tatuus F4-T014	(France) Paul-Adrien Pallot	3	0	0	0	0	NC	5th
2019	Tatuus F4-T014	(United Kingdom) Jonny Edgar	3	0	2	0	39	14th	5th
2019	Tatuus F4-T014	(Romania) Filip Ugran	3	0	0	0	0	NC	5th
2019	Tatuus F4-T014	(Italy) Emidio Pesce	6	0	0	0	1	19th	5th
2020	Tatuus F4-T014	(Romania) Filip Ugran	3	2	2	1	55	10th	5th
2020	Tatuus F4-T014	(Switzerland) Jasin Ferati	3	0	0	0	14	20th	5th
2020	Tatuus F4-T014	(Italy) Francesco Simonazzi	3	0	0	0	23	14th	5th
2021	Tatuus F4-T014	(Mexico) Santiago Ramos	3	0	0	0	31	16th	7th
2021	Tatuus F4-T014	(Italy) Francesco Braschi	3	0	0	0	4	21st	7th
2021	Tatuus F4-T014	(Mexico) Jorge Garciarce	3	0	0	0	0	28th	7th
2021	Tatuus F4-T014	(Switzerland) Samir Ben	3	0	0	0	0	31st	7th

== Timeline ==
Current series
Italian Formula 4 Championship	2014–present
BOSS GP Series	2016–2017, 2024–present
Formula Winter Series	2023–present
Formula 4 CEZ Championship	2023–present
Euro 4 Championship	2024–present
Former series
Swiss Formula Ford	1993–2000
German Formula Ford	1993, 1999–2000
Formula Ford EuroCup	1995–1997
French Formula Ford	1997–1998
French Formula Renault Championship	2000, 2006
Eurocup Formula Renault 2.0	2001–2009, 2013
Formula Renault 2000 Germany	2002–2004
Formula Renault V6 Eurocup	2003–2004
Formula Renault 2.0 Middle European Championship	2004, 2007–2010
Formula Renault 3.5 Series	2005–2006
Formula Renault 2.0 Italy	2005–2009
Formula Renault Northern European Cup	2007, 2013
International Formula Master	2007–2009
Formula Renault 2.0 West European Cup	2008–2009
Formula Abarth	2010–2012
Formula Pilota China	2011
Formula Renault 2.0 Alps	2013–2014
GP3 Series	2010–2018
ADAC Formula 4	2015–2019, 2021–2022
F4 Spanish Championship	2019–2021
FIA Formula 3 Championship	2019–2024
