= 2022 ACCR Formula 4 Trophy =

ACCR Formula 4 Championship season

The 2022 ACCR Formula 4 Trophy was a motor racing series held in the Central and Eastern Europe, competed over four rounds. The full six rounds schedule was supposed to be the first season of the ACCR Formula 4 Championship organized by the Automobile Club of the Czech Republic (ACCR; Czech: Autoklub České republiky (AČR)). The season was supposed to start with its first round taking place at the Hungaroring in April and with the final round taking place at Brno Circuit in September. After many calendar changes caused by massive delivery delays, it was announced on 6 July that the start of the championship as an FIA Formula 4 Championship would be postponed to 2023 and that only the last three original rounds would be held as a trophy series. The series uses Tatuus F4-T421 chassis primarily, although Tatuus F4-T014 was eligible for the Trophy class.

The ACCR Formula 4 races were held as a sub-class of the Formula Libre category in the ESET V4 Cup package.

== Teams and drivers ==
| Team | No. | Driver | Class | Rounds |
|---|---|---|---|---|
| (Slovakia) Procar Motorsport | 1 | (Austria) Patrick Schober | T J | 3 |
| (Slovenia) Lema Racing | 5 | (Italy) Tommaso Lovati | T J | 1–3 |
| (Czech Republic) JMT Racing Engineering | 23 | (Czech Republic) Vojtěch Birgus | T J | 1 |
| (Slovakia) Racing Trevor | 68 | (Hungary) Zénó Kovács | J | All |
FX Pro Series entries
| (Italy) Eureka Competition | 1 | (Italy) Andrea Bodellini | | 2 |
| (Italy) MDR Events | 8 | (Italy) Giovanni Maschio | | 2 |
| (Italy) Mondiale Racing | 22 | (Italy) Andrea Raiconi | | 2 |
| (Italy) Team Zanatta | 26 | (Italy) Alberto Zanatta | | 2 |
| Privateer | 27 | (Italy) Silvano Rangheri | | 2 |
| (Italy) Dexters Motorsport | 64 | (Italy) Elia Galvanin | | 2 |
| (Italy) G Motorsport | 69 | (Italy) Salvatore Liotti | | 2 |

| Icon | Legend |
|---|---|
| T | Trophy class |
| J | Drivers that compete for the Junior Championship |
| W | Woman Trophy |
| G | Guest drivers ineligible to score points |

== Calendar ==
The series joining ESET V4 Cup package on its six round schedule was announced on 2 December 2021. On 30 March 2022, the round at the Hungaroring was cancelled, with Monza being added to the schedule as the final venue of the season. On 13 April 2022, the round scheduled for 24–26 June at Tor Poznań was replaced by the round at Vallelunga Circuit on 8–10 July. On 6 July 2022, the status of the series changed and subsequently all the planned rounds supporting Formula X Racing Weekend were cancelled.

| Rnd. | | Circuit/Location | Date | Package |
|---|---|---|---|---|
| – | R1 | (Hungary) Hungaroring, Mogyoród | 8–10 April | ESET V4 Cup |
| – | R2 | (Hungary) Hungaroring, Mogyoród | 8–10 April | ESET V4 Cup |
| 1 | R1 | (Austria) Red Bull Ring, Spielberg | 3–5 June | ESET V4 Cup |
| 1 | R2 | (Austria) Red Bull Ring, Spielberg | 3–5 June | ESET V4 Cup |
| – | R1 | (Poland) Tor Poznań, Poznań | 24–26 June | ESET V4 Cup |
| – | R2 | (Poland) Tor Poznań, Poznań | 24–26 June | ESET V4 Cup |
| – | R1 | (Italy) Vallelunga Circuit, Campagnano di Roma | 8–10 July | Formula X Racing Weekend |
| – | R2 | (Italy) Vallelunga Circuit, Campagnano di Roma | 8–10 July | Formula X Racing Weekend |
| 2 | R1 | (Croatia) Automotodrom Grobnik, Čavle | 22–24 July | ESET V4 Cup |
| 2 | R2 | (Croatia) Automotodrom Grobnik, Čavle | 22–24 July | ESET V4 Cup |
| 3 | R1 | (Slovakia) Slovakiaring, Orechová Potôň | 19–21 August | ESET V4 Cup |
| 3 | R2 | (Slovakia) Slovakiaring, Orechová Potôň | 19–21 August | ESET V4 Cup |
| 4 | R1 | (Czech Republic) Brno Circuit, Brno | 9–11 September | ESET V4 Cup |
| 4 | R2 | (Czech Republic) Brno Circuit, Brno | 9–11 September | ESET V4 Cup |
| – | R1 | (Italy) Monza Circuit, Monza | 28–30 October | Formula X Racing Weekend |
| – | R2 | (Italy) Monza Circuit, Monza | 28–30 October | Formula X Racing Weekend |

== Race results ==
| Rnd. | | Circuit | Pole position | Fastest lap | Winning driver | Winning team |
|---|---|---|---|---|---|---|
| 1 | R1 | (Austria) Red Bull Ring | (Italy) Tommaso Lovati | (Italy) Tommaso Lovati | (Czech Republic) Vojtěch Birgus (Note: Lovati crossed the line first but was given a 30-second time penalty for a grid position infringement. Birgus inherited the win.) | (Czech Republic) JMT Racing Engineering |
| 1 | R2 | (Austria) Red Bull Ring | (Italy) Tommaso Lovati | (Italy) Tommaso Lovati | (Italy) Tommaso Lovati | (Slovenia) Lema Racing |
| 2 | R1 | (Croatia) Automotodrom Grobnik | (Italy) Tommaso Lovati | (Hungary) Zénó Kovács | (Italy) Salvatore Liotti | (Italy) G Motorsport |
| 2 | R2 | (Croatia) Automotodrom Grobnik | Cancelled after the death of a marshall | | | |
| 3 | R1 | (Slovakia) Slovakiaring | (Hungary) Zénó Kovács | (Austria) Patrick Schober | (Austria) Patrick Schober | (Slovakia) Procar Motorsport |
| 3 | R2 | (Slovakia) Slovakiaring | (Hungary) Zénó Kovács | (Austria) Patrick Schober | (Austria) Patrick Schober | (Slovakia) Procar Motorsport |
| 4 | R1 | (Czech Republic) Brno Circuit | (Hungary) Zénó Kovács | (Hungary) Zénó Kovács | (Hungary) Zénó Kovács | (Slovakia) Racing Trevor |
| 4 | R2 | (Czech Republic) Brno Circuit | (Hungary) Zénó Kovács | (Hungary) Zénó Kovács | (Hungary) Zénó Kovács | (Slovakia) Racing Trevor |

== Trophy standings ==
Points were awarded to the top 10 classified finishers in each race. No points were awarded for pole position or fastest lap. Half points were awarded if no more than three drivers participated in the first race of a competition. Despite being hold as a non-championship round, the results from the competition at Red Bull Ring were used in the final classification.

| Position | 1st | 2nd | 3rd | 4th | 5th | 6th | 7th | 8th | 9th | 10th |
| Points | 25 | 18 | 15 | 12 | 10 | 8 | 6 | 4 | 2 | 1 |

| Pos | Driver | RBR (Austria) | | GRO (Croatia) | | SVK (Slovakia) | | BRN (Czech Republic) | | Pts |
| Pos | Driver | R1 | R2 | R1 | R2 | R1 | R2 | R1 | R2 | Pts |
|---|---|---|---|---|---|---|---|---|---|---|
| 1 | (Hungary) Zénó Kovács | 3 | 3 | 3 | C | 2 | 2 | 1 | 1 | 70 |
| 2 | (Italy) Tommaso Lovati | 2 | 1 | 6 | C | 3 | DNS | | | 37 |
| 3 | (Austria) Patrick Schober | | | | | 1 | 1 | | | 25 |
| 4 | (Italy) Salvatore Liotti | | | 1 | C | | | | | 25 |
| 5 | (Czech Republic) Vojtěch Birgus | 1 | 2 | | | | | | | 21.5 |
| 6 | (Italy) Andrea Bodellini | | | 2 | C | | | | | 18 |
| 7 | (Italy) Giovanni Maschio | | | 4 | C | | | | | 12 |
| 8 | (Italy) Andrea Raiconi | | | 5 | C | | | | | 10 |
| 9 | (Italy) Silvano Rangheri | | | 7 | C | | | | | 8 |
| – | (Italy) Alberto Zanatta | | | Ret | C | | | | | – |
| – | (Italy) Elia Galvanin | | | Ret | C | | | | | – |
