= 2025 Formula 4 CEZ Championship =

Formula 4 CEZ Championship season

The 2025 Formula 4 CEZ Championship was the third season of the Formula 4 CEZ Championship, a motor racing series for the Central Europe regulated according to FIA Formula 4 regulations, and organised and promoted by the Automobile Club of the Czech Republic (ACCR), Krenek Motorsport and HM Sports.

The season commenced on 11 April at Red Bull Ring in Austria and concluded on 7 September at Brno Circuit in the Czech Republic.

== Teams and drivers ==
Team	No.	Driver	Class	Rounds
(Czech Republic) JMT Racing	2	(Canada) Nicole Havrda		5–6
(Czech Republic) JMT Racing	65	(Czech Republic) Roman Roubíček		3
(Austria) Renauer Motorsport	6	(Canada) Hady-Noah Mimassi		All
(Austria) Renauer Motorsport	9	(Austria) Simon Schranz		All
(Austria) Renauer Motorsport	44	(Sweden) William Karlsson		2
(Switzerland) Maffi Racing	5	(Poland) Igor Polak		5–6
(Switzerland) Maffi Racing	7	(Denmark) David Walther		1–4
(Switzerland) Maffi Racing	14	(Denmark) Nikolaj Dyrved		All
(Switzerland) Maffi Racing	18	(Switzerland) Andreas Lo Bue		All
(Switzerland) Maffi Racing	22	(Czech Republic) Teodor Borenstein		All
(Switzerland) Maffi Racing	31	(Kyrgyzstan) Kirill Kutskov (Note: Kutskov is Russian, but competes under a Kyrgyz Licence as Russian national emblems were banned by the FIA following the Russian invasion of Ukraine.)		5–6
(Czech Republic) Orlen Janik Motorsport	8	(France) Romuald Bocquet		1–2, 4
(Czech Republic) Orlen Janik Motorsport	8	(North Macedonia) Stefan Treneski		5–6
(Czech Republic) Orlen Janik Motorsport	88	(Czech Republic) David Gorčica		All
(Romania) Real Racing	11	(Romania) Luca Viișoreanu		1
(Czech Republic) F4 CEZ Academy	17	(Czech Republic) František Němec		All
(Czech Republic) F4 CEZ Academy	65	(Czech Republic) Tomáš Chabr		4
(Switzerland) Jenzer Motorsport	21	(Argentina) Teo Schropp		1
(Switzerland) Jenzer Motorsport	23	(Mexico) Nicolás Cortés		All
(Switzerland) Jenzer Motorsport	24	(Mexico) Javier Herrera		All
(Switzerland) Jenzer Motorsport	25	(Argentina) Bautista Acosta		1–2
(Switzerland) Jenzer Motorsport	25	(Switzerland) Florentin Hattemer		6
(Switzerland) Jenzer Motorsport	48	(Argentina) Gino Trappa		All
(Switzerland) Jenzer Motorsport	77	(United Kingdom) Bart Harrison		1
(Switzerland) Jenzer Motorsport	144	(Czech Republic) Max Karhan		All
(Germany) Henni Performance	26	(Germany) Kiara Henni		All
(Slovenia) AS Motorsport	61	(Poland) Michalina Sabaj		1–2
(Slovenia) AS Motorsport	75	(Poland) Michalina Sabaj		3–6
(Slovenia) AS Motorsport	90	(United Kingdom) Chase Fernandez		1–2
(Hungary) Zengő Motorsport	69	(Hungary) Benett Gáspár		All
(Germany) Mathilda Racing	188	(Germany) Mathilda Paatz		All

Icon	Legend
G	Guest drivers ineligible to score points

== Race calendar and results ==
The provisional calendar featuring six rounds across four countries was published on 31 October 2024. On 11 November, the planned last round at the Balaton Park Circuit, Hungary, on 26–28 September was replaced by another round at the Red Bull Ring on 11–13 April.

Rnd.		Circuit/Location	Date	Pole position	Fastest lap	Winning driver	Winning team	Supporting
1	R1	(Austria) Red Bull Ring, Spielberg	12 April	(United Kingdom) Bart Harrison	(United Kingdom) Bart Harrison	(United Kingdom) Bart Harrison	(Switzerland) Jenzer Motorsport	TCR Eastern Europe Trophy
1	R2	(Austria) Red Bull Ring, Spielberg	13 April		(Denmark) David Walther	(United Kingdom) Bart Harrison	(Switzerland) Jenzer Motorsport	TCR Eastern Europe Trophy
1	R3	(Austria) Red Bull Ring, Spielberg	13 April		(Romania) Luca Viișoreanu	(Romania) Luca Viișoreanu	(Romania) Real Racing	TCR Eastern Europe Trophy
2	R1	(Austria) Red Bull Ring, Spielberg	17 May	(Argentina) Gino Trappa	(Denmark) David Walther	(Argentina) Gino Trappa	(Switzerland) Jenzer Motorsport	GT Cup Series
2	R2	(Austria) Red Bull Ring, Spielberg	18 May		(Denmark) David Walther	(Denmark) David Walther	(Switzerland) Maffi Racing	GT Cup Series
2	R3	(Austria) Red Bull Ring, Spielberg	18 May		(Denmark) David Walther	(Argentina) Gino Trappa	(Switzerland) Jenzer Motorsport	GT Cup Series
3	R1	(Austria) Salzburgring, Plainfeld	31 May	(Argentina) Gino Trappa	(Czech Republic) Max Karhan	(Czech Republic) Max Karhan	(Switzerland) Jenzer Motorsport	TCR Eastern Europe Trophy
3	R2	(Austria) Salzburgring, Plainfeld	1 June		(Denmark) David Walther	(Czech Republic) Max Karhan	(Switzerland) Jenzer Motorsport	TCR Eastern Europe Trophy
3	R3	(Austria) Salzburgring, Plainfeld	1 June		(Czech Republic) David Gorčica	(Argentina) Gino Trappa	(Switzerland) Jenzer Motorsport	TCR Eastern Europe Trophy
4	R1	(Czech Republic) Autodrom Most, Most	26 July	(Argentina) Gino Trappa	(Argentina) Gino Trappa	(Argentina) Gino Trappa	(Switzerland) Jenzer Motorsport	TCR Eastern Europe Trophy; GT Cup Series
4	R2	(Czech Republic) Autodrom Most, Most	27 July		(Argentina) Gino Trappa	(Argentina) Gino Trappa	(Switzerland) Jenzer Motorsport	TCR Eastern Europe Trophy; GT Cup Series
4	R3	(Czech Republic) Autodrom Most, Most	27 July		(Mexico) Javier Herrera	(Mexico) Javier Herrera	(Switzerland) Jenzer Motorsport	TCR Eastern Europe Trophy; GT Cup Series
5	R1	Automotodróm Slovakia Ring, Orechová Potôň	23 August	(Mexico) Nicolás Cortés	(Argentina) Gino Trappa	(Kyrgyzstan) Kirill Kutskov (Note: Trappa finished first on the track but was given a five-second penalty for a safety car procedure infringement. Kutskov inherited the win.)	(Switzerland) Maffi Racing	TCR Eastern Europe Trophy; GT Cup Series
5	R2	Automotodróm Slovakia Ring, Orechová Potôň	24 August		(Kyrgyzstan) Kirill Kutskov	(Kyrgyzstan) Kirill Kutskov	(Switzerland) Maffi Racing	TCR Eastern Europe Trophy; GT Cup Series
5	R3	Automotodróm Slovakia Ring, Orechová Potôň	24 August		(Argentina) Gino Trappa	(Argentina) Gino Trappa	(Switzerland) Jenzer Motorsport	TCR Eastern Europe Trophy; GT Cup Series
6	R1	(Czech Republic) Brno Circuit, Brno	6 September	(Mexico) Javier Herrera	(Mexico) Nicolás Cortés	(Mexico) Javier Herrera	(Switzerland) Jenzer Motorsport	TCR Eastern Europe Trophy; GT Cup Series
6	R2	(Czech Republic) Brno Circuit, Brno	7 September		(Czech Republic) Max Karhan	(Mexico) Javier Herrera	(Switzerland) Jenzer Motorsport	TCR Eastern Europe Trophy; GT Cup Series
6	R3	(Czech Republic) Brno Circuit, Brno	7 September		(Argentina) Gino Trappa	(Kyrgyzstan) Kirill Kutskov	(Switzerland) Maffi Racing	TCR Eastern Europe Trophy; GT Cup Series

== Championship standings ==
Points were awarded to the top 10 classified finishers in each race. No points were awarded for pole position or fastest lap.

Position	**1st**	**2nd**	**3rd**	**4th**	**5th**	**6th**	**7th**	**8th**	**9th**	**10th**
Points	25	18	15	12	10	8	6	4	2	1

=== Drivers' standings ===
Pos	Driver	RBR1 (Austria)			RBR2 (Austria)			SAL (Austria)			MOS (Czech Republic)			SVK (Slovakia)			BRN (Czech Republic)			Pts
Pos	Driver	R1	R2	R3	R1	R2	R3	R1	R2	R3	R1	R2	R3	R1	R2	R3	R1	R2	R3	Pts
1	(Argentina) Gino Trappa	2	2	2	**1**	4	1	**2**	2	1	**1**	1	5	12	8	1	6	5	5	294
2	(Czech Republic) Max Karhan	6	5	4	4	5	3	1	1	2	3	3	2	2	3	3	2	2	2	285
3	(Mexico) Javier Herrera	5	6	5	16	Ret	8	4	14	15†	4	4	1	7	5	2	**1**	1	4	189
4	(Mexico) Nicolás Cortés	7	7	6	15	6	6	3	Ret	4	2	2	12	**19†**	18	11	4	9	3	128
5	(Canada) Hady-Noah Mimassi	Ret	9	12	5	3	4	7	13	7	5	17	4	3	2	6	7	Ret	7	126
6	(Kyrgyzstan) Kirill Kutskov													1	1	4	3	3	1	117
7	(Denmark) David Walther	8	3	7	3	1	5	12	4	3	Ret	5	10							113
8	(Germany) Mathilda Paatz	13	Ret	9	6	7	2	8	5	5	Ret	9	11	5	19	Ret	5	7	6	94
9	(Austria) Simon Schranz	Ret	DNS	DNS	8	Ret	9	6	3	8	6	6	3	9	11	Ret	9	Ret	10	69
10	(United Kingdom) Bart Harrison	**1**	1	3																65
11	(Hungary) Benett Gáspár	11	11	8	7	11	10	13	9	9	7	Ret	9	4	4	Ret	15	6	9	57
12	(Switzerland) Andreas Lo Bue	DNP	12	11	9	13	11	5	8	6	10	8	6	8	6	15	8	Ret	14	53
13	(Czech Republic) Teodor Borenstein	10	8	Ret	11	Ret	Ret	9	11	11	Ret	10	8	6	7	5	12	4	11	48
14	(Sweden) William Karlsson				2	2	7													42
15	(Romania) Luca Viișoreanu	4	Ret	1																37
16	(Czech Republic) David Gorčica	12	17	13	17†	8	13	Ret	7	10	9	7	Ret	18†	10	7	10	8	8	35
17	(Czech Republic) František Němec	16	16	Ret	13	9	12	11	6	14	8	11	7	11	9	8	18	11	16	26
18	(United Kingdom) Chase Fernandez	3	Ret	DSQ	WD	WD	WD													15
19	(Argentina) Teo Schropp	19	4	18																12
20	(Canada) Nicole Havrda													10	13	9	13	10	13	4
21	(Argentina) Bautista Acosta	9	10	10	WD	WD	WD													4
22	(Denmark) Nikolaj Dyrved	15	15	14	10	Ret	14	14	15	13	11	12	16	16	15	10	20	17	17	2
23	(Poland) Michalina Sabaj	14	14	16	14	Ret	DNS	10	10	12	13	13	17†	13	12	12	14	13	Ret	2
24	(France) Romuald Bocquet	17	13	15	12	10	Ret				12	14	14							1
25	(Switzerland) Florentin Hattemer																11	12	12	0
26	(Germany) Kiara Henni	18	18	17	WD	12	15	15	12	WD	Ret	15	15	14	14	Ret	17	16	Ret	0
27	(North Macedonia) Stefan Treneski													17	17	13	16	14	15	0
28	(Czech Republic) Tomáš Chabr										14	16	13							0
29	(Poland) Igor Polak													15	16	14	19	15	Ret	0
–	(Czech Republic) Roman Roubíček							WD	WD	WD										–
Pos	Driver	R1	R2	R3	R1	R2	R3	R1	R2	R3	R1	R2	R3	R1	R2	R3	R1	R2	R3	Pts
Pos	Driver	RBR1 (Austria)			RBR2 (Austria)			SAL (Austria)			MOS (Czech Republic)			SVK (Slovakia)			BRN (Czech Republic)			Pts

Colour	Result
Gold	Winner
Silver	Second place
Bronze	Third place
Green	Points classification
Blue	Non-points classification
Blue	Non-classified finish (NC)
Purple	Retired, not classified (Ret)
Red	Did not qualify (DNQ)
Red	Did not pre-qualify (DNPQ)
Black	Disqualified (DSQ)
White	Did not start (DNS)
White	Withdrew (WD)
White	Race cancelled (C)
Blank	Did not practice (DNP)
Blank	Did not arrive (DNA)
Blank	Excluded (EX)

**Bold** – Pole
Italics – Fastest Lap

- † – Driver did not finish the race, but was classified as they completed over 75% of the race distance.

=== Teams' standings ===
Pos	Team	RBR1 (Austria)			RBR2 (Austria)			SAL (Austria)			MOS (Czech Republic)			SVK (Slovakia)			BRN (Czech Republic)			Pts
Pos	Team	R1	R2	R3	R1	R2	R3	R1	R2	R3	R1	R2	R3	R1	R2	R3	R1	R2	R3	Pts
1	(Switzerland) Jenzer Motorsport	1	1	2	1	4	1	1	1	1	1	1	1	2	3	1	1	1	2	687
1	(Switzerland) Jenzer Motorsport	2	2	3	4	5	3	2	2	2	2	2	2	7	5	2	2	2	3	687
2	(Switzerland) Maffi Racing	8	3	7	3	1	5	5	4	3	10	5	6	1	1	4	3	3	1	319
2	(Switzerland) Maffi Racing	10	8	11	9	13	11	9	8	6	11	8	8	6	6	5	8	4	11	319
3	(Austria) Renauer Motorsport	Ret	9	12	2	2	4	6	3	7	5	6	3	3	2	6	7	Ret	7	231
3	(Austria) Renauer Motorsport	Ret	DNS	DNS	5	3	7	7	13	8	6	17	4	9	11	Ret	9	Ret	10	231
4	(Germany) Mathilda Racing	13	Ret	9	6	7	2	8	5	5	Ret	9	11	5	19	Ret	5	7	6	94
5	(Hungary) Zengő Motorsport	11	11	8	7	11	10	13	9	9	7	Ret	9	4	4	Ret	15	6	9	57
6	(Romania) Real Racing	4	Ret	1																37
7	(Czech Republic) Orlen Janik Motorsport	12	13	13	12	8	13	Ret	7	10	9	7	14	17	10	7	10	8	8	36
7	(Czech Republic) Orlen Janik Motorsport	17	17	15	17†	10	Ret				12	14	Ret	19†	17	13	16	14	15	36
8	(Czech Republic) F4 CEZ Academy	16	16	Ret	13	9	12	11	6	14	8	11	7	11	9	8	18	11	16	26
8	(Czech Republic) F4 CEZ Academy										14	16	13							26
9	(Slovenia) AS Motorsport	3	14	16	14	Ret	DNS	10	10	12	13	13	17†	13	12	12	14	13	Ret	17
9	(Slovenia) AS Motorsport	14	Ret	DSQ	WD	WD	WD													17
10	(Czech Republic) JMT Racing							WD	WD	WD				10	13	9	13	10	13	4
11	(Germany) Henni Performance	18	18	17	WD	12	15	15	12	WD	Ret	15	15	14	14	Ret	17	16	Ret	0
Pos	Team	R1	R2	R3	R1	R2	R3	R1	R2	R3	R1	R2	R3	R1	R2	R3	R1	R2	R3	Pts
Pos	Team	RBR1 (Austria)			RBR2 (Austria)			SAL (Austria)			MOS (Czech Republic)			SVK (Slovakia)			BRN (Czech Republic)			Pts
