= 2026 Formula 4 CEZ Championship =

Czech motor racing series season

The 2026 Formula 4 CEZ Championship was the fourth season of the Formula 4 CEZ Championship, a motor racing series for the Central Europe regulated according to FIA Formula 4 regulations, and organised and promoted by the Automobile Club of the Czech Republic (ACCR) and Krenek Motorsport.

== Teams and drivers ==
Team	No.	Driver	Class	Rounds
(Denmark) STEP Motorsport	2	(Sweden) Erik Poulsen (Note: Poulsen is a Danish-Swedish driver competing under a Swedish licence.)		All
(Denmark) STEP Motorsport	61	(Sweden) Alexia Danielsson	W	1–4
(Denmark) STEP Motorsport	61	(Denmark) Knud Nielsen		5
(Denmark) STEP Motorsport	77	(Denmark) Viktor Poulsen		All
(Italy) Cram Motorsport	3	(Germany) Simon Rechenmacher		All
(Italy) Cram Motorsport	4	(Netherlands) Felipe Reijs		4–5
(Italy) Cram Motorsport	4	(Brazil) Vicky Farfus	W	6
(Italy) Cram Motorsport	15	(Brazil) Alexandre Louza		All
(Italy) Cram Motorsport	29	(Bulgaria) Lyuboslav Ruykov		1
(Italy) Cram Motorsport	29	(United States) Payton Westcott	W	2
(Italy) Cram Motorsport	29	(Sweden) Leo Nilsson		4–6
(Switzerland) Maffi Racing	5	(Poland) Igor Polak		1–5
(Switzerland) Maffi Racing	7	(Denmark) David Walther		1–5
(Switzerland) Maffi Racing	12	(Poland) Cezary Bień		2–5
(Switzerland) Maffi Racing	14	(Denmark) Nikolaj Dyrved		1–5
(Germany) Mathilda Racing	5	(Austria) Clara Stiebleichinger	W	6
(Germany) Mathilda Racing	9	(France) Jade Jacquet	W	1
(Germany) Mathilda Racing	9	(United States) Dean Pedersen		2–6
(Germany) Mathilda Racing	18	(Germany) Mathilda Paatz	W	1–5
(Germany) Mathilda Racing	47	(Austria) Ivonn Simeonova	W	4–6
(Austria) Renauer Motorsport	6	(Lithuania) Tomas Rudokas		All
(Austria) Renauer Motorsport	8	(Switzerland) Andreas Lo Bue		1–4
(Slovenia) / PA Racing by AS Motorsport (Note: Car No. 10 entered as PA Racing by AS Motorsport, car No. 75 entered as AS Motorsport.); (Slovenia) / AS Motorsport	10	(Italy) Ginevra Panzeri	W	1–2, 6
(Slovenia) / PA Racing by AS Motorsport; (Slovenia) / AS Motorsport	16	(Hungary) Máté Kocsis		5
(Slovenia) / PA Racing by AS Motorsport; (Slovenia) / AS Motorsport	75	(Poland) Michalina Sabaj	W	All
(Czech Republic) Janík Motorsport	11	(Czech Republic) Albert Písařík		1, 3–4, 6
(Czech Republic) Janík Motorsport	33	(Czech Republic) Tobiáš Paško		All
(Czech Republic) Janík Motorsport	88	(Czech Republic) David Gorčica		All
(Hungary) HunOK Motorsport	13	(Hungary) Máté Kocsis		6
(Hungary) HunOK Motorsport	19	(Hungary) Patrik Lipovics		All
(Romania) Real Racing	13	(Bulgaria) Samuil Ivanov		1–2
(Romania) Real Racing	31	(Denmark) Knud Nielsen		1–2
(Romania) Real Racing	31	(Switzerland) Paul Andriotis		6
(Czech Republic) JMT Engineering	17	(Czech Republic) František Němec		1–4
(Czech Republic) JMT Engineering	65	(Czech Republic) Roman Roubíček		1, 3–4
(Czech Republic) JMT Engineering	427	(North Macedonia) Stefan Treneski		All
(Switzerland) Jenzer Motorsport	20	(Czech Republic) Teo Borenstein		All
(Switzerland) Jenzer Motorsport	21	(Czech Republic) Ella Häkkinen	W	All
(Switzerland) Jenzer Motorsport	22	(Germany) Elia Weiss		All
(Switzerland) Jenzer Motorsport	25	(Switzerland) Georgiy Zasov		All
(Switzerland) Jenzer Motorsport	26	(Lithuania) Markas Šilkūnas		All
(Switzerland) Jenzer Motorsport	144	(Czech Republic) Max Karhan		All
(Argentina) Scuderia Buell	27	(Chile) Agustín Sepúlveda		1–2
(United Kingdom) Hitech Grand Prix	30	(United Kingdom) Archie Owen		6
(Italy) / Harp Racing (Note: Car No. 35 entered as Harp Racing in rounds 1 and 3, and as Drivex in round 2. Cars No. 32, No. 76 and No. 96 entered as Drivex.); (Italy) / Drivex	32	(Argentina) Simon Bulbarella		4
(Italy) / Harp Racing; (Italy) / Drivex	35	(Brazil) Filippo Fiorentino		1
(Italy) / Harp Racing; (Italy) / Drivex	35	(Mexico) Sebastián Frigolet		2
(Italy) / Harp Racing; (Italy) / Drivex	35	(Poland) Piotr Orcholski		3–6
(Italy) / Harp Racing; (Italy) / Drivex	76	(Argentina) Jorge Bruno		1–4
(Italy) / Harp Racing; (Italy) / Drivex	96	(Sweden) Leo Nilsson		1–3
(Germany) Dutt Motorsport	42	(Germany) Noah Nölken		All
(Italy) / SG Motors (Note: Car No. 52 entered as SG Motors, car No. 86 entered as ABA Racing by SG Motors.); (Italy) / ABA Racing by SG Motors	52	(Sweden) Mio Olert		All
(Italy) / SG Motors; (Italy) / ABA Racing by SG Motors	86	(Slovenia) Aleksandar Bogunović		All
(Slovakia) Sladecka Motorsport	69	(Slovakia) Miroslav Kepák		All
(Italy) Technorace	78	(Italy) Francesco Coppola		All
(Italy) Technorace	99	(Italy) Antonio Errigo		All
(Hungary) Zengő Motorsport	555	(Hungary) Benett Gáspár		All

Icon	Legend
W	Woman Trophy
G	Guest drivers ineligible to score points

== Race calendar and results ==
The race calendar for the 2026 season was announced on 28 October. Initially, each event was planned to feature three races, for a total of 18 races in the season. Following the grid expansion to over forty full-time entries, four races are held every event – three qualifying races and the final race for the top 32 drivers after totalling the results of the former ones.

Rnd.		Circuit	Date	Pole position	Fastest lap	Winning driver	Winning team	Woman Trophy winner	Supporting
1	R1	(Austria) Red Bull Ring, Spielberg	11 April	(Czech Republic) Teo Borenstein	(Czech Republic) Max Karhan	(Czech Republic) Teo Borenstein	(Switzerland) Jenzer Motorsport	(Italy) Ginevra Panzeri	GT Cup Series; Clio Cup Bohemia
1	R2	(Austria) Red Bull Ring, Spielberg	12 April	(Czech Republic) Max Karhan	(Germany) Elia Weiss	(Germany) Elia Weiss	(Switzerland) Jenzer Motorsport	(Czech Republic) Ella Häkkinen	GT Cup Series; Clio Cup Bohemia
1	R3	(Austria) Red Bull Ring, Spielberg	12 April	(Czech Republic) Teo Borenstein	(Denmark) David Walther	(Denmark) David Walther (Note: Teo Borenstein originally won the race but was given a 5 second time penalty. David Walther, initially classified second, thus inherited the win.)	(Switzerland) Maffi Racing	(Germany) Mathilda Paatz	GT Cup Series; Clio Cup Bohemia
1	R4	(Austria) Red Bull Ring, Spielberg	12 April	(Czech Republic) Teo Borenstein	(Germany) Elia Weiss	(Denmark) David Walther	(Switzerland) Maffi Racing	(Germany) Mathilda Paatz	GT Cup Series; Clio Cup Bohemia
2	R1	(Austria) Salzburgring, Plainfeld	30 May	(Denmark) David Walther	(Germany) Elia Weiss	(Germany) Elia Weiss	(Switzerland) Jenzer Motorsport	(Germany) Mathilda Paatz	TCR Eastern Europe Trophy; Clio Cup Bohemia
2	R2	(Austria) Salzburgring, Plainfeld	31 May	(Germany) Elia Weiss	(Germany) Elia Weiss	(Germany) Elia Weiss	(Switzerland) Jenzer Motorsport	(Germany) Mathilda Paatz	TCR Eastern Europe Trophy; Clio Cup Bohemia
2	R3	(Austria) Salzburgring, Plainfeld	31 May	(Denmark) David Walther	(Germany) Simon Rechenmacher	(Czech Republic) Max Karhan	(Switzerland) Jenzer Motorsport	(Czech Republic) Ella Häkkinen	TCR Eastern Europe Trophy; Clio Cup Bohemia
2	R4	(Austria) Salzburgring, Plainfeld	31 May	(Germany) Elia Weiss	The race was cancelled due to heavy rain and strong winds.				TCR Eastern Europe Trophy; Clio Cup Bohemia
3	R1	Automotodróm Slovakia Ring, Orechová Potôň	6 June	(Czech Republic) Teo Borenstein	(Germany) Simon Rechenmacher	(Czech Republic) Teo Borenstein	(Switzerland) Jenzer Motorsport	(Germany) Mathilda Paatz	European Truck Racing Championship; GT Cup Series; TCR European Endurance Series; GTC Endurance Challenge
3	R2	Automotodróm Slovakia Ring, Orechová Potôň	6 June	(Germany) Simon Rechenmacher	(Germany) Simon Rechenmacher	(Germany) Simon Rechenmacher	(Italy) Cram Motorsport	(Germany) Mathilda Paatz	European Truck Racing Championship; GT Cup Series; TCR European Endurance Series; GTC Endurance Challenge
3	R3	Automotodróm Slovakia Ring, Orechová Potôň	7 June	(Czech Republic) Teo Borenstein	(Czech Republic) Teo Borenstein	(Czech Republic) Teo Borenstein	(Switzerland) Jenzer Motorsport	(Czech Republic) Ella Häkkinen	European Truck Racing Championship; GT Cup Series; TCR European Endurance Series; GTC Endurance Challenge
3	R4	Automotodróm Slovakia Ring, Orechová Potôň	7 June	(Czech Republic) Teo Borenstein	(Denmark) David Walther	(Denmark) David Walther	(Switzerland) Maffi Racing	(Sweden) Alexia Danielsson	European Truck Racing Championship; GT Cup Series; TCR European Endurance Series; GTC Endurance Challenge
4	R1	(Czech Republic) Autodrom Most, Most	1 August	(Czech Republic) Max Karhan	(Czech Republic) Teo Borenstein	(Czech Republic) Max Karhan	(Switzerland) Jenzer Motorsport	(Germany) Mathilda Paatz	TCR Eastern Europe Trophy; GT Cup Series; Clio Cup Bohemia
4	R2	(Czech Republic) Autodrom Most, Most	1 August	(Czech Republic) Teo Borenstein	(Germany) Elia Weiss	(Germany) Elia Weiss	(Switzerland) Jenzer Motorsport	(Czech Republic) Ella Häkkinen	TCR Eastern Europe Trophy; GT Cup Series; Clio Cup Bohemia
4	R3	(Czech Republic) Autodrom Most, Most	2 August	(Czech Republic) Max Karhan	(Czech Republic) Max Karhan	(Germany) Elia Weiss	(Switzerland) Jenzer Motorsport	(Czech Republic) Ella Häkkinen	TCR Eastern Europe Trophy; GT Cup Series; Clio Cup Bohemia
4	R4	(Czech Republic) Autodrom Most, Most	2 August	(Germany) Elia Weiss	(Czech Republic) Teo Borenstein	(Germany) Elia Weiss	(Switzerland) Jenzer Motorsport	(Poland) Michalina Sabaj	TCR Eastern Europe Trophy; GT Cup Series; Clio Cup Bohemia
5	R1	(Czech Republic) Brno Circuit, Brno	12 September	(Switzerland) Georgiy Zasov	(Germany) Elia Weiss	(Germany) Elia Weiss	(Switzerland) Jenzer Motorsport	(Germany) Mathilda Paatz	GT Cup Series; Clio Cup Bohemia
5	R2	(Czech Republic) Brno Circuit, Brno	12 September	(Czech Republic) Teo Borenstein	(Czech Republic) Teo Borenstein	(Czech Republic) Teo Borenstein	(Switzerland) Jenzer Motorsport	(Czech Republic) Ella Häkkinen	GT Cup Series; Clio Cup Bohemia
5	R3	(Czech Republic) Brno Circuit, Brno	13 September	(Switzerland) Georgiy Zasov	(Germany) Elia Weiss	(Switzerland) Georgiy Zasov	(Switzerland) Jenzer Motorsport	(Poland) Michalina Sabaj	GT Cup Series; Clio Cup Bohemia
5	R4	(Czech Republic) Brno Circuit, Brno	13 September	(Germany) Elia Weiss	(Germany) Elia Weiss	(Germany) Elia Weiss	(Switzerland) Jenzer Motorsport	(Germany) Mathilda Paatz	GT Cup Series; Clio Cup Bohemia
6	R1	(Hungary) Hungaroring, Mogyoród	24 October	(Germany) Elia Weiss	(Lithuania) Markas Šilkūnas	(Germany) Elia Weiss	(Switzerland) Jenzer Motorsport	(Brazil) Vicky Farfus	Eurocup-3; TCR Eastern Europe Trophy; GT Cup Series; Clio Cup Bohemia
6	R2	(Hungary) Hungaroring, Mogyoród	24 October	(Czech Republic) Teo Borenstein	(Switzerland) Georgiy Zasov	(Switzerland) Georgiy Zasov	(Switzerland) Jenzer Motorsport	(Brazil) Vicky Farfus	Eurocup-3; TCR Eastern Europe Trophy; GT Cup Series; Clio Cup Bohemia
6	R3	(Hungary) Hungaroring, Mogyoród	25 October	(Germany) Elia Weiss	(Switzerland) Georgiy Zasov	(Germany) Elia Weiss	(Switzerland) Jenzer Motorsport	(Czech Republic) Ella Häkkinen	Eurocup-3; TCR Eastern Europe Trophy; GT Cup Series; Clio Cup Bohemia
6	R4	(Hungary) Hungaroring, Mogyoród	25 October	(Germany) Elia Weiss	(Czech Republic) Teo Borenstein	(Czech Republic) Teo Borenstein	(Switzerland) Jenzer Motorsport	(Italy) Ginevra Panzeri	Eurocup-3; TCR Eastern Europe Trophy; GT Cup Series; Clio Cup Bohemia

== Championship standings ==
In response to the increased grid size in 2026, points are now awarded to the top 15 classified finishers in each race. No points are awarded for pole position or fastest lap.

Position	**1st**	**2nd**	**3rd**	**4th**	**5th**	**6th**	**7th**	**8th**	**9th**	**10th**	**11th**	**12th**	**13th**	**14th**	**15th**
Points	25	20	16	13	11	10	9	8	7	6	5	4	3	2	1

=== Drivers' standings ===
Pos	Driver	RBR (Austria)				SAL (Austria)				SVK (Slovakia)				MOS (Czech Republic)				BRN (Czech Republic)				HUN (Hungary)				Pts
Pos	Driver	R1	R2	R3	R4	R1	R2	R3	R4	R1	R2	R3	R4	R1	R2	R3	R4	R1	R2	R3	R4	R1	R2	R3	R4	Pts
1	(Germany) Elia Weiss		1	3	2	1	**1**		**C**	2		4	6		1	1	**1**	1		2	**1**	**1**		**1**	**2**	369
2	(Czech Republic) Teo Borenstein	**1**		**2**	**26**	2		6	C	**1**		**1**	**2**	2	**2**		2	9	**1**		2	3	**2**		1	318
3	(Czech Republic) Max Karhan	2	**2**		3		2	1	C		3	5	25	**1**		**2**	5	2	2		3	20	3		17	256
4	(Denmark) David Walther	3		1	1	**3**		**2**	C		2	2	1	3		3	3		5	5	DNS					237
5	(Germany) Simon Rechenmacher	4	3		14		3	3	C	4	**1**		Ret		3	23	Ret	3	7		4	4		4	3	197
6	(Lithuania) Markas Šilkūnas	7	9		8	5		4	C	3		6	3	4	14		7		3	3	6	2		3	16	192
7	(Switzerland) Georgiy Zasov		4	6	5	25		7	C	9		7	4		16	8	9	**5**		**1**	7		1	2	8	185
8	(Slovenia) Aleksandar Bogunović		13	5	4	7	6		C		6	8	26†	5		4	4	6	4		8		4	5	5	167
9	(Italy) Francesco Coppola	6	7		6	4	11		C	22†	Ret		DNQ	6	4		6	Ret		8	14		8	6	9	115
10	(United States) Dean Pedersen					6	4		C		11	3	10	10	7		Ret	10		14	11	6		7	6	107
11	(Sweden) Erik Poulsen		16	10	24	16		18	C	8	5		5	12		15	12		9	7	10	5	5		7	98
12	(Germany) Mathilda Paatz	12		7	9	8	5		C	14	4		Ret	7		6	Ret	4		Ret	13					89
13	(Czech Republic) Ella Häkkinen		8	11	12		10	9	C		7	9	24		5	5	Ret	14	11		25		18	9	12	86
14	(Czech Republic) David Gorčica		6	DNS	7	11		10	C	7	9		Ret	9	8		18		18	13	17	8		14	10	80
15	(Italy) Antonio Errigo		11	23	21		9	8	C	6	8		7	14	25†		16	11	6		15	10	9		15	79
16	(Denmark) Knud Nielsen	9		9	27†	23		5	C										8	4	5					57
17	(Sweden) Leo Nilsson	21		18	DNQ		22	21	DNQ	17		14	16	8		9	8	7		9	12	12		12	Ret	53
18	(North Macedonia) Stefan Treneski	19	10		10	24†		12	C		10	20	14	16	9		13		17	12	22	11		13	23	46
19	(Switzerland) Andreas Lo Bue		5	8	28†	10	7		C		Ret	11	18	DSQ		10	24									45
20	(Denmark) Viktor Poulsen	28†	14		16		17	15	C	15		10	8		18	7	14	23		15	18	9		17	14	39
21	(Hungary) Benett Gáspár	10		26	11		23	25	DNQ	Ret	13		12	18		17	25†	15		6	19		Ret	8	Ret	37
22	(Sweden) Mio Olert		23	16	29†		13	24	C	10		Ret	DNS	11	10		10	16		16	Ret		13	10	18	35
23	(Netherlands) Felipe Reijs													13		12	11	8	10		9					33
24	(Brazil) Alexandre Louza	14		15	20		12	14	C	Ret		12	11						13	10	20		Ret	16	20	27
25	(Italy) Ginevra Panzeri	11	12		Ret	13	18		C													19	7		11	26
26	(Bulgaria) Lyuboslav Ruykov	5		4	22																					24
27	(United Kingdom) Archie Owen																						10	11	4	24
28	(Poland) Igor Polak	15		14	13		16	17	C	Ret	12		13		13	18	15		16	11	DNS					22
29	(Brazil) Vicky Farfus																					7	6		13	22
30	(Lithuania) Tomas Rudokas	16	Ret		DNS	15		11	C		17	17	22	DSQ	15		19	12	14		24		11	DSQ	25	18
31	(Sweden) Alexia Danielsson		17	13	15	19		22	C		Ret	15	15		6	21	Ret									16
32	(Poland) Piotr Orcholski									5		Ret	DNS		24	14	23	17		20	Ret	15	15		Ret	15
33	(Poland) Michalina Sabaj	13	19		23		14	26	C	12	16		17	19	12		20	19		17	23	Ret		18	24	13
34	(Slovakia) Miroslav Kepák	18	24		DNQ	14		13	C		14	13	21	20		16	21	13	20		21		19	21	DNQ	13
35	(United States) Payton Westcott					12	8		C																	12
36	(Argentina) Jorge Bruno	20	18		18	Ret	26†		DNQ	11	21		9		Ret	Ret	DNQ									12
37	(Czech Republic) František Němec	17		17	19	9	24		C	13		16	20	23		20	DNQ									10
38	(Hungary) Patrik Lipovics		21	20	DNQ	21	25		DNQ		18	Ret	DNQ		11	13	17	18	19		DNS	22	14		22	10
39	(Czech Republic) Tobiáš Paško	24	Ret		DNQ	17		19	C	16	15		19	15	20		26†		15	18	26	14	12		26	9
40	(Brazil) Filippo Fiorentino	8	20		Ret																					8
41	(Argentina) Simon Bulbarella													17		11	Ret									5
42	(Austria) Ivonn Simeonova														23	19	DNQ		12	Ret	16	16		19	21	4
43	(France) Jade Jacquet	22		12	25																					4
44	(Czech Republic) Albert Písařík	25		19	DNQ						20	21	DNS		17	25	22					13		20	19	3
45	(Mexico) Sebastián Frigolet						15	16	C																	1
46	(Chile) Agustín Sepúlveda	23	15		17		19	20	DNQ																	1
47	(Switzerland) Paul Andriotis																						17	15	Ret	1
48	(Hungary) Máté Kocsis																	21	23		DNQ	18	16		27	0
49	(Germany) Noah Nölken	26		21	DNQ	18		23	C	21		19	DNQ	22		22	DNQ	20		21	DNQ	17		22	28	0
50	(Denmark) Nikolaj Dyrved		25†	25†	DNQ	20	21		DNQ	18		18	23	21	19		DNQ		22	19	DNS					0
51	(Poland) Cezary Bień					22	20		DNQ	19		Ret	DNQ		21	24	DNQ	22	21		DNQ					0
52	(Czech Republic) Roman Roubíček	27		22	DNQ					20	19		DNQ	24	22		DNQ									0
53	(Austria) Clara Stiebleichinger																					21	20		DNQ	0
54	(Bulgaria) Samuil Ivanov		22	24	DNQ	DNS		DNS	DNQ																	0
Pos	Driver	R1	R2	R3	R4	R1	R2	R3	R4	R1	R2	R3	R4	R1	R2	R3	R4	R1	R2	R3	R4	R1	R2	R3	R4	Pts
Pos	Driver	RBR (Austria)				SAL (Austria)				SVK (Slovakia)				MOS (Czech Republic)				BRN (Czech Republic)				HUN (Hungary)				Pts

Colour	Result
Gold	Winner
Silver	Second place
Bronze	Third place
Green	Points classification
Blue	Non-points classification
Blue	Non-classified finish (NC)
Purple	Retired, not classified (Ret)
Red	Did not qualify (DNQ)
Red	Did not pre-qualify (DNPQ)
Black	Disqualified (DSQ)
White	Did not start (DNS)
White	Withdrew (WD)
White	Race cancelled (C)
Blank	Did not practice (DNP)
Blank	Did not arrive (DNA)
Blank	Excluded (EX)

**Bold** – Pole
Italics – Fastest Lap

- † – Driver did not finish the race, but was classified as they completed at least 75%, rounded down, of the race distance.
