= Formula 4 CEZ Championship =

Single-Seater Racing Championship

- Category: FIA Formula 4
- Region: Central Europe
- Inaugural season: 2023
- Constructors: Tatuus
- Engine suppliers: Abarth
- Tyre suppliers: Pirelli
- Drivers' champion: (Argentina) Gino Trappa
- Teams' champion: (Switzerland) Jenzer Motorsport
- Official website: Official website

The Formula 4 CEZ Championship (previously ACCR Formula 4 Trophy) is a formula racing series regulated according to FIA Formula 4 regulations. The championship is organized and promoted by the Automobile Club of the Czech Republic (ACCR; Czech: Autoklub České republiky (AČR)) and Krenek Motorsport. The championship was started in 2022 as a trophy, and gained championship status in 2023.

== History ==
The championship was planned to be inaugurated in 2022, however it was held as a trophy due to the massive delivery delays of cars. For 2023, the championship was firstly named as ACCR Czech Formula, then it was named as Formula 4 CEZ Championship after the FIA certification.

== Cars ==
Italian race car constructor Tatuus is contracted to design and build all the cars. The chassis is a monocoque made of carbon fibre. In the 2022 season, older generation Tatuus F4-T014 could participate in the championship due to the delays of newer generation Tatuus F4-T421 cars; however older generation cars were not allowed to participate in the 2023 season due to the FIA certification process.

== Champions ==
=== Drivers ===
Season	Driver	Team	Races	Poles	Wins	Podiums	Fastest lap	Points	Margins
2022 (Note: 2022 ACCR Formula 4 Trophy consisted of non-championship races, and it was not certified as a Formula 4 championship.)	(Hungary) Zénó Kovács	(Slovakia) Racing Trevor	6 of 7	3	2	7	3	70	33
2023	(Switzerland) Ethan Ischer	(Switzerland) Jenzer Motorsport	14 of 14	5	8	10	7	263	2
2024	(Austria) Oscar Wurz	(Switzerland) Jenzer Motorsport	17 of 18	1	2	14	6	301	25
2025	(Argentina) Gino Trappa	(Switzerland) Jenzer Motorsport	18 of 18	3	6	11	5	294	9

=== Teams ===
Season	Team	Poles	Wins	Podiums	Fastest lap	Points	Margins
2023	(Switzerland) Jenzer Motorsport	6	11	29	7	549	345
2024	(Switzerland) Jenzer Motorsport	1	8	24	10	599	235
2025	(Switzerland) Jenzer Motorsport	6	13	35	10	687	368

== Circuits ==
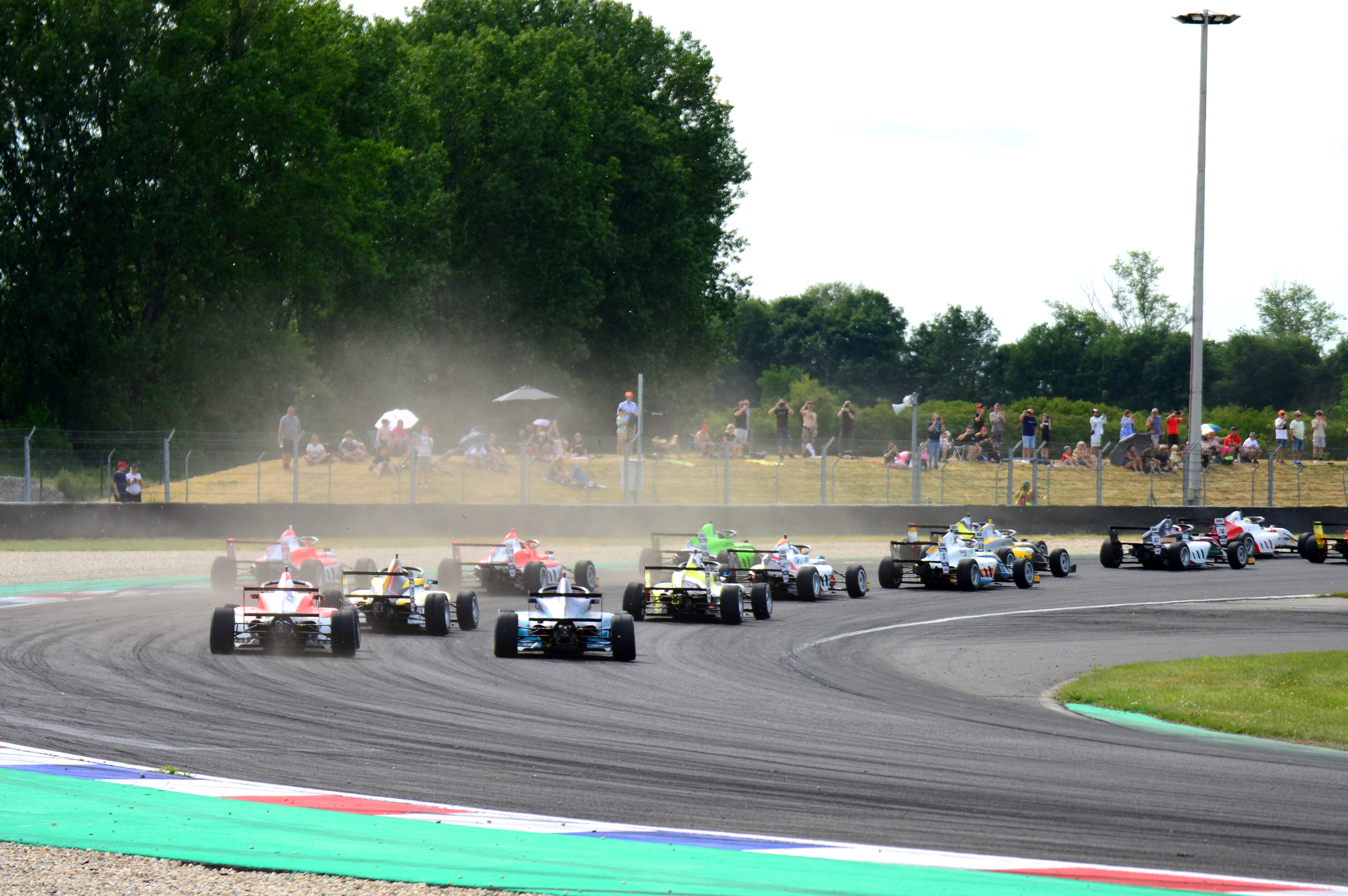
F4 CEZ at the Slovakia Ring in 2026.

- **Bold** denotes a circuit will be used in the 2026 season.

Number	Circuits	Rounds	Years
1	(Austria) **Red Bull Ring**	5 (Note: Red Bull Ring hosted two races in 2025 season.)	2023–present
2	**Slovakia Ring**	4	2023–present
2	(Czech Republic) **Autodrom Most**	4	2023–present
2	(Czech Republic) **Brno Circuit**	4	2023–present
5	(Austria) **Salzburgring**	3	2024–present
6	(Hungary) **Hungaroring**	2	2023, 2026–2027
6	(Hungary) Balaton Park Circuit	2	2023–2024
