= List of 2026 motorsport champions =

2026 motorsport champions
Previous: 2025	Next: 2027

This list of 2026 motorsport champions is a list of national or international motorsport series with championships decided by the points or positions earned by a driver from multiple races where the season was completed during the 2026 calendar year.

== Dirt oval racing ==
Series	Champion	Refer
Australian Late Model Championship	(Australia) Kye Blight	
Australian Speedcar Championship	(Australia) Kaidon Brown	
Australian Sprintcar Championship	(Australia) Jock Goodyer	
Australian Super Sedan Championship	(Australia) Joel Berkley	
Australian V8 Dirt Modified Championship	(Australia) Seiton Young	
Lucas Oil Late Model Dirt Series	(United States) Brandon Sheppard	
New Zealand Midget Car Championship	(New Zealand) Aaron Hodgson	
New Zealand Sprint Car Championship	(New Zealand) Daniel Thomas	
New Zealand Superstock Championship	(New Zealand) Brad Uhlenberg	
Super DIRTcar Series	(United States) Alex Yankowski	
World of Outlaws Late Model Series	(United States) Bobby Pierce	
World of Outlaws Sprint Car Series	(United States) David Gravel	
USAC Silver Crown Series	(United States) C.J. Leary	2026 USAC Silver Crown Series

== Drag racing ==
Series	Champion	Refer
NHRA Mission Foods Drag Racing Series	Top Fuel: (United States) Shawn Langdon	2026 NHRA Mission Foods Drag Racing Series
NHRA Mission Foods Drag Racing Series	Funny Car: (United States) J.R. Todd	2026 NHRA Mission Foods Drag Racing Series
NHRA Mission Foods Drag Racing Series	Pro Stock: (United States) Dallas Glenn	2026 NHRA Mission Foods Drag Racing Series
NHRA Mission Foods Drag Racing Series	Pro Motorcycle: (United States) Gaige Herrera	2026 NHRA Mission Foods Drag Racing Series
FIA European Drag Racing Championship	Top Fuel: (Sweden) Susanne Callin	2026 European Drag Racing Championship
FIA European Drag Racing Championship	Top Methanol: (Sweden) Tony Bryntesson	2026 European Drag Racing Championship
FIA European Drag Racing Championship	Pro Stock: (Sweden) Jimmy Ålund	2026 European Drag Racing Championship
FIA European Drag Racing Championship	Pro Modified: (Estonia) Andres Arnover	2026 European Drag Racing Championship

== Drifting ==
Series	Champion	Refer
D1 Grand Prix	(Japan) Koudai Sobagiri	2026 D1 Grand Prix series
D1 Grand Prix	Teams: (Japan) Mind Control Racing Shibatire	2026 D1 Grand Prix series
D1 Grand Prix	Tanso: (Japan) Koudai Sobagiri	2026 D1 Grand Prix series
D1NZ	(New Zealand) Dave Steedman	2026 D1NZ season
D1NZ	Pro-Sport: (New Zealand) Blake Myles	2026 D1NZ season
Drift Masters	(Poland) Paweł Korpuliński	2026 Drift Masters season
Drift Masters	Nations Cup: (Republic of Ireland) Ireland	2026 Drift Masters season
Formula Drift	(Republic of Ireland) Conor Shanahan	2026 Formula Drift season
Formula Drift	PROSPEC: (Belarus) Dmitriy Brutskiy	2026 Formula Drift season

== Esports ==
Series	Champion	Refer
eNASCAR Coca-Cola iRacing Series	(United States) Steven Wilson	2026 eNASCAR Coca-Cola iRacing Championship Series
eNASCAR Coca-Cola iRacing Series	Teams: (United States) Spire Motorsports	2026 eNASCAR Coca-Cola iRacing Championship Series
eNASCAR College iRacing Series	(Canada) Connor Yeroschak	2026 eNASCAR College iRacing Series
eNASCAR College iRacing Series	Teams: (Canada) University of Calgary	2026 eNASCAR College iRacing Series
F1 Sim Racing World Championship	(Wales) Otis Lawrence	2026 F1 Sim Racing World Championship
F1 Sim Racing World Championship	Teams: (Austria) Oracle Red Bull Sim Racing	2026 F1 Sim Racing World Championship

== Kart racing ==
Series	Champion	Refer
CIK-FIA Karting World Championship	OK: (Netherlands) Dean Hoogendoorn	2026 Karting World Championship
CIK-FIA Karting World Championship	OK-J: (Belgium) Antonine Venant	2026 Karting World Championship
CIK-FIA Karting World Championship	KZ: (Sweden) Viktor Gustafsson	2026 Karting World Championship
FIA Karting European Championship	OK: (United Kingdom) Noah Baglin	2026 Karting European Championship
FIA Karting European Championship	OK-J: (United Kingdom) Will Green	2026 Karting European Championship
FIA Karting European Championship	KZ: (France) Émilien Denner	2026 Karting European Championship
FIA Karting European Championship	KZ2: (Finland) Kimi Tani	2026 Karting European Championship
FIA Karting European Championship	A&D-S: (Poland) Kacper Turoboyski	2026 Karting European Championship
FIA Karting European Championship	A&D-J: (Poland) Maksymilian Piątek	2026 Karting European Championship
CIK-FIA International Super Cup	KZ2-M: (France) Anthony Abbasse	2026 CIK-FIA International Super Cup
CIK-FIA World Cup	OK-N: (Brazil) Yuri Morelli	2026 CIK-FIA World Cup
CIK-FIA World Cup	OKN-J: (Italy) Niccolo Perico	2026 CIK-FIA World Cup
FIA Karting Academy Trophy	Senior: (United Kingdom) Albie Lapper	2026 Karting Academy Trophy
FIA Karting Academy Trophy	Junior: (Hong Kong) John Han	2026 Karting Academy Trophy
FIA Karting Asia-Pacific Championship	A&D-S: (Denmark) Signe Pejs Ørnbøll	2026 FIA Karting Asia-Pacific Championship
FIA Karting Asia-Pacific Championship	A&D-J: (Hong Kong) John Han	2026 FIA Karting Asia-Pacific Championship
Champions of the Future Euro Series	OK: (United Kingdom) Noah Baglin	2026 Champions of the Future Euro Series
Champions of the Future Euro Series	OK-J: (Netherlands) Daniel Mirón	2026 Champions of the Future Euro Series
Deutsche Kart-Meisterschaft	KZ2: (France) Emilien Denner	2026 Deutsche Kart-Meisterschaft
Deutsche Kart-Meisterschaft	KZ2 Cup: (Germany) Oliver Staedtler	2026 Deutsche Kart-Meisterschaft
Deutsche Kart-Meisterschaft	OK-N: (Czech Republic) Jakub Kamenik	2026 Deutsche Kart-Meisterschaft
Deutsche Kart-Meisterschaft	OKN-J: (Germany) Henri Möhring	2026 Deutsche Kart-Meisterschaft
Deutsche Kart-Meisterschaft	MINI: (Denmark) Albert Poulsen	2026 Deutsche Kart-Meisterschaft
IAME Euro Series	X30 Senior: (Spain) Aaron Garcia	2026 IAME Euro Series
IAME Euro Series	X30 Junior: (Spain) Ivan González	2026 IAME Euro Series
IAME Euro Series	X30 MINI: (United Kingdom) Ilyas Sami	2026 IAME Euro Series
Italian Karting Championship	KZ2: (Romania) Daniel Vasile	2026 Italian Karting Championship
Italian Karting Championship	KZ2 U18: (Finland) Kimi Tani	2026 Italian Karting Championship
Italian Karting Championship	KZ2 Master: (Italy) Davide Forè	2026 Italian Karting Championship
Italian Karting Championship	OK-N: (Italy) Manuel Scognamiglio	2026 Italian Karting Championship
Italian Karting Championship	OKN-J: (United States) Josh Bergman	2026 Italian Karting Championship
Italian Karting Championship	MINI Gr. 3: (United Kingdom) Alfie Mair	2026 Italian Karting Championship
Italian Karting Championship	MINI U10: (United States) Zayne Burgess	2026 Italian Karting Championship
Rotax Max Challenge	DD2: (Sweden) Hannes Morin	2026 Rotax Max Challenge
Rotax Max Challenge	DD2 Masters: (Denmark) Jannik Nielsen	2026 Rotax Max Challenge
Rotax Max Challenge	Senior: (United Kingdom) Lewis Gilbert	2026 Rotax Max Challenge
Rotax Max Challenge	Junior: (Czech Republic) Zdenek Babicek	2026 Rotax Max Challenge
Rotax Max Challenge	E20 Senior: (Hungary) Adam Szabo	2026 Rotax Max Challenge
Rotax Max Challenge	E20 Masters: (Brazil) Michel Aboissa	2026 Rotax Max Challenge
Rotax Max Challenge	E10 Mini: (Brazil) Rafael Guimaraes	2026 Rotax Max Challenge
Rotax Max Challenge	Micro: (New Zealand) Nico Thomasen	2026 Rotax Max Challenge
Rotax Max Challenge	Mini: (Lithuania) Emilis Capkauskas	2026 Rotax Max Challenge
Rotax Max Challenge	Nations Cup: TBD	2026 Rotax Max Challenge
WSK Euro Series	KZ2: Maksim Orlov	2026 WSK Euro Series
WSK Euro Series	OK: (Indonesia) Qarrar Firhand	2026 WSK Euro Series
WSK Euro Series	OK-N: (Italy) Andrea Giudice	2026 WSK Euro Series
WSK Euro Series	OK-J: (Czech Republic) Zdeněk Bábíček	2026 WSK Euro Series
WSK Euro Series	OKN-J: (Sweden) Elton Hedfors	2026 WSK Euro Series
WSK Euro Series	MINI Gr3: (United Kingdom) Alfie Mair	2026 WSK Euro Series
WSK Euro Series	MINI U10: (United States) Zayne Burgess	2026 WSK Euro Series
WSK Super Master Series	KZ2: Maksim Orlov	2026 WSK Super Master Series
WSK Super Master Series	OK: (Ukraine) Lev Krutogolov	2026 WSK Super Master Series
WSK Super Master Series	OK-J: (Brazil) Antônio Pizzonia Neto	2026 WSK Super Master Series
WSK Super Master Series	OKN-J: (Italy) Niccolò Perico	2026 WSK Super Master Series
WSK Super Master Series	MINI: (Malta) Zane Pace	2026 WSK Super Master Series
WSK Super Master Series	MINI U10: (United States) Zayne Burgess	2026 WSK Super Master Series

== Motorcycle racing ==
Series	Champion	Refer
FIM MotoGP World Championship	(Spain) Marc Marquez	2026 MotoGP World Championship
FIM MotoGP World Championship	Teams: (Italy) Aprilia Racing	2026 MotoGP World Championship
FIM MotoGP World Championship	Constructors: TBD	2026 MotoGP World Championship
FIM Moto2 World Championship	TBD	2026 Moto2 World Championship
FIM Moto2 World Championship	Teams: TBD	2026 Moto2 World Championship
FIM Moto2 World Championship	Constructors: (Germany) Kalex	2026 Moto2 World Championship
FIM Moto3 World Championship	(Spain) Máximo Quiles	2026 Moto3 World Championship
FIM Moto3 World Championship	Teams: (Spain) CFMoto Aspar Team	2026 Moto3 World Championship
FIM Moto3 World Championship	Constructors: (Austria) KTM	2026 Moto3 World Championship
FIM Moto2 European Championship	(Poland) Milan Pawelec	2026 Moto2 European Championship
FIM Moto3 Junior World Championship	(Spain) Carlos Cano	2026 FIM Moto3 Junior World Championship
FIM Stock European Championship	(France) Lorenzo Fellon	2026 FIM Stock European Championship
FIM Women's Circuit Racing World Championship	(Spain) María Herrera	2026 FIM Women's Circuit Racing World Championship
British Superbike Championship	(United Kingdom) Kyle Ryde	2026 British Superbike Championship
British Superbike Championship	Teams: (United Kingdom) Nitrous Coin Nitrous Competitions Racing Ducati	2026 British Superbike Championship
British Supersport Championship	(United Kingdom) Luke Stapleford	2026 British Supersport Championship
British Sportbike Championship	(United Kingdom) Asher Durham	2026 British Sportbike Championship
Canadian Superbike Championship	(United Kingdom) Ben Young	2026 Canadian Superbike Championship
Canadian Superbike Championship	Constructors: (Japan) Honda	2026 Canadian Superbike Championship
Harley-Davidson Bagger World Cup	(Australia) Archie McDonald	2026 Harley-Davidson Bagger World Cup
All Japan Road Race Championship	JSB1000: (Japan) Ryo Mizuno	2026 All Japan Road Race Championship
All Japan Road Race Championship	ST1000: (Japan) Takuma Kunimine	2026 All Japan Road Race Championship
All Japan Road Race Championship	ST600: (Japan) Rei Matsuoka	2026 All Japan Road Race Championship
All Japan Road Race Championship	J-GP3: (Japan) Shingo Iidaka	2026 All Japan Road Race Championship
Moto4 Asia Cup	(Japan) Hayato Chishiki	2026 Moto4 Asia Cup
Moto4 British Cup	(United Kingdom) Ryan Frost	2026 Moto4 British Cup
Moto4 European Cup	(Spain) Álvaro Lucas	2026 Moto4 European Cup
Moto4 Northern Cup	(Germany) Robin Siegert	2026 Moto4 Northern Cup
MotoAmerica Superbike Championship	(United States) Bobby Fong	2026 MotoAmerica Superbike Championship
MotoAmerica Superbike Championship	Superbike Cup: (United States) Andrew Lee	2026 MotoAmerica Superbike Championship
MotoAmerica Supersport Championship	(South Africa) Darryn Binder	2026 MotoAmerica Supersport Championship
MotoAmerica Talent Cup	(United States) Nathan Gouker	2026 MotoAmerica Talent Cup
National Superstock Championship	(United Kingdom) David Allingham	2026 National Superstock Championship
Red Bull MotoGP Rookies Cup	(Spain) Beñat Fernández	2026 Red Bull MotoGP Rookies Cup
Superbike World Championship	(Italy) Nicolò Bulega	2026 Superbike World Championship
Superbike World Championship	Teams: (Italy) Aruba.it Racing - Ducati	2026 Superbike World Championship
Superbike World Championship	Manufacturers: (Italy) Ducati	2026 Superbike World Championship
Supersport World Championship	(Spain) Albert Arenas	2026 Supersport World Championship
Supersport World Championship	Teams: (Italy) AS bLU cRU Racing Team	2026 Supersport World Championship
Supersport World Championship	Manufacturers: (Japan) Yamaha	2026 Supersport World Championship
Sportbike World Championship	(Spain) Xavier Artigas	2026 Sportbike World Championship
Sportbike World Championship	Teams: (Italy) Team Prodina Kawasaki XCI	2026 Sportbike World Championship
Sportbike World Championship	Manufacturers: (Japan) Kawasaki	2026 Sportbike World Championship

=== Motocross ===
Series	Champion	Refer
FIM Motocross World Championship	MXGP: (Netherlands) Jeffrey Herlings	2026 FIM Motocross World Championship
FIM Motocross World Championship	MXGP Manufacturers: (Japan) Honda	2026 FIM Motocross World Championship
FIM Motocross World Championship	MX2: (Spain) Guillem Farrés	2026 FIM Motocross World Championship
FIM Motocross World Championship	MX2 Manufacturers: (United Kingdom) Triumph	2026 FIM Motocross World Championship
FIM Women's Motocross World Championship	(Spain) Daniela Guillén	2026 FIM Women's Motocross World Championship
FIM Women's Motocross World Championship	Manufacturers: (Spain) GasGas	2026 FIM Women's Motocross World Championship
FIM Sidecar Motocross World Championship	(Belgium) Marvin Vanluchene (Netherlands) Ben van den Bogaart	2026 Sidecar Motocross World Championship
ADAC MX Masters	(Netherlands) Roan van de Moosdijk	2026 ADAC MX Masters
ADAC MX Masters	Manufacturers: (Denmark) Nicolai Skovbjerg	2026 ADAC MX Masters
AMA Supercross Championship	450 SX: (Germany) Ken Roczen	2026 AMA Supercross Championship
AMA Supercross Championship	250 SX West: (United States) Haiden Deegan	2026 AMA Supercross Championship
AMA Supercross Championship	250 SX East: (New Zealand) Cole Davies	2026 AMA Supercross Championship
AMA Motocross Championship	450cc: (Australia) Hunter Lawrence	2026 AMA National Motocross Championship
AMA Motocross Championship	250cc: (New Zealand) Cole Davies	2026 AMA National Motocross Championship
British Motocross Championship	MX1: (United Kingdom) Conrad Mewse	2026 British Motocross Championship
British Motocross Championship	MX2: (United Kingdom) Charlie Heyman	2026 British Motocross Championship
Dutch Masters of Motocross	500cc: (Netherlands) Jeffrey Herlings	2026 Dutch Masters of Motocross
Dutch Masters of Motocross	250cc: (Latvia) Kārlis Reišulis	2026 Dutch Masters of Motocross
Dutch Masters of Motocross	125cc: (Netherlands) Timo Heuver	2026 Dutch Masters of Motocross
European Motocross Championship	EMX250: (Spain) Francisco García	2026 European Motocross Championship
European Motocross Championship	EMX250 Manufacturers: (Japan) Kawasaki	2026 European Motocross Championship
European Motocross Championship	EMX125: (Austria) Ricardo Bauer	2026 European Motocross Championship
European Motocross Championship	EMX125 Manufacturers: (Austria) KTM	2026 European Motocross Championship
European Motocross Championship	EMXOpen: (Finland) Jere Haavisto	2026 European Motocross Championship
European Motocross Championship	EMXOpen Manufacturers: (Austria) KTM	2026 European Motocross Championship
European Motocross Championship	EMX2T: (Czech Republic) Václav Kovář	2026 European Motocross Championship
European Motocross Championship	EMX2T Manufacturers: (Austria) KTM	2026 European Motocross Championship
European Motocross Championship	EMX85: (Latvia) Patriks Cīrulis	2026 European Motocross Championship
European Motocross Championship	EMX85 Manufacturers: (Austria) Husqvarna	2026 European Motocross Championship
European Motocross Championship	EMX65: (United Kingdom) Jack Waters	2026 European Motocross Championship
European Motocross Championship	EMX65 Manufacturers: (Austria) KTM	2026 European Motocross Championship
French Elite Motocross Championship	Elite MX1: (France) Maxime Desprey	2026 French Elite Motocross Championship
French Elite Motocross Championship	Elite MX2: (Spain) Francisco García	2026 French Elite Motocross Championship
Italian Prestige Motocross Championship	MX1 Elite: (Slovenia) Jan Pancar	2026 Italian Prestige Motocross Championship
Italian Prestige Motocross Championship	MX1 Fast: (Italy) Ismaele Guarise	2026 Italian Prestige Motocross Championship
Italian Prestige Motocross Championship	MX2 Elite: (Italy) Valerio Lata	2026 Italian Prestige Motocross Championship
Italian Prestige Motocross Championship	MX2 Fast: (Italy) Riccardo Pini	2026 Italian Prestige Motocross Championship
New Zealand Motocross Championship	MX1: (New Zealand) Maximus Purvis	2026 New Zealand Motocross Championship
New Zealand Motocross Championship	MX2: (New Zealand) Hayden Draper	2026 New Zealand Motocross Championship
ProMX	MX1: (Australia) Jed Beaton	2026 ProMX Championship
ProMX	MX2: (Australia) Alex Larwood	2026 ProMX Championship
Spanish Motocross Championship	Elite-MX1: (Spain) José Butrón	2026 Spanish Motocross Championship
Spanish Motocross Championship	Elite-MX2: (Spain) Adrià Monné	2026 Spanish Motocross Championship
SuperMotocross World Championship	450cc: (Spain) Jorge Prado	2026 SuperMotocross World Championship
SuperMotocross World Championship	250cc: (United States) Levi Kitchen	2026 SuperMotocross World Championship
Swedish Motocross Championship	MX1: (Sweden) Alvin Östlund	2026 Swedish Motocross Championship
Swedish Motocross Championship	MX2: (Sweden) Alve Callemo	2026 Swedish Motocross Championship
Triple Crown Series	450 Pro: (Canada) Dylan Wright	2026 Triple Crown Series
Triple Crown Series	250 Pro: (Canada) Dylan Rempel	2026 Triple Crown Series
Triple Crown Series	WMX: (United States) Jamie Astudillo	2026 Triple Crown Series

=== Off-road ===
Series	Champion	Refer
FIM Enduro World Championship	(Spain) Josep García	2026 FIM Enduro World Championship
FIM Enduro World Championship	Enduro 1: (Spain) Josep García	2026 FIM Enduro World Championship
FIM Enduro World Championship	Enduro 2: (Italy) Andrea Verona	2026 FIM Enduro World Championship
FIM Enduro World Championship	Enduro 3: (United Kingdom) Steve Holcombe	2026 FIM Enduro World Championship
FIM Enduro World Championship	Junior: (Italy) Alberto Elgari	2026 FIM Enduro World Championship
FIM Enduro World Championship	Junior 1: (Italy) Alberto Elgari	2026 FIM Enduro World Championship
FIM Enduro World Championship	Junior 2: (France) Romain Dagna	2026 FIM Enduro World Championship
FIM Enduro World Championship	Youth: (Italy) Pietro Scardina	2026 FIM Enduro World Championship
FIM Enduro World Championship	Women: (United States) Rachel Gutish	2026 FIM Enduro World Championship
FIM Enduro World Championship	Junior Women: (France) Lorna Lafont	2026 FIM Enduro World Championship
FIM Enduro World Championship	Open 2-stroke: (Spain) Jordi Quer	2026 FIM Enduro World Championship
FIM Enduro World Championship	Open 4-stroke: (Italy) Lorenzo Bernini	2026 FIM Enduro World Championship

=== Rally raid ===
Series	Champion	Refer
FIM Bajas World Cup	(United Kingdom) Alex McInnes	2026 FIM Bajas World Cup
FIM Bajas World Cup	Quad: (Saudi Arabia) Hani Al-Noumesi	2026 FIM Bajas World Cup
FIM Bajas World Cup	Women: (Poland) Joanna Modrzewska	2026 FIM Bajas World Cup
FIM Bajas World Cup	Junior: (United Kingdom) Alex McInnes	2026 FIM Bajas World Cup
FIM Bajas World Cup	Veteran: (United Arab Emirates) Mohammed Al-Balooshi	2026 FIM Bajas World Cup
FIM Bajas World Cup	Trail: (Italy) Matteo Bottino	2026 FIM Bajas World Cup

=== Speedway ===
Series	Champion	Refer
FIM Long Track World Championship	(Germany) Erik Riss	2026 FIM Long Track World Championship
FIM Long Track of Nations	Netherlands (Meijerink / Hummel / Meijer)	2026 FIM Long Track of Nations
Speedway Grand Prix	(United Kingdom) Robert Lambert	2026 Speedway Grand Prix
Australian Individual Speedway Championship	(Australia) Jack Holder	2026 Australian Individual Speedway Championship
Polish Individual Speedway Championship	(Poland) Maciej Janowski	2026 Polish Individual Speedway Championship
British Speedway Championship	(United Kingdom) Robert Lambert	2026 British Speedway Championship
Speedway European Championship	(Denmark) Leon Madsen	2026 Speedway European Championship
Speedway Grand Prix 2	(Denmark) Mikkel Andersen	2026 SGP2
European Under-19 Individual Speedway Championship	(Poland) Kevin Małkiewicz	2026 European Under-19 Individual Speedway Championship
Speedway World Cup	Australia (Douglas / Kurtz / Doyle / Fricke / Tungate)	2026 Speedway World Cup
Speedway of Nations 2	Poland (Przyjemski / Bańbor / Małkiewicz)	2026 Speedway of Nations 2
European Team Speedway Championship	Denmark (Jakobsen / Jensen / Jepsen Jensen / Michelsen / Nagel)	2026 European Team Speedway Championship
European Under-24 Team Speedway Championship	Poland (Kowalski / Pawełczak / Małkiewicz / Bańbor / Cierniak)	2026 European Under 24 Team Speedway Championship

== Open wheel racing ==
Series	Champion	Refer
FIA Formula One World Championship	(Italy) Kimi Antonelli	2026 Formula One World Championship
FIA Formula One World Championship	Constructors: (Germany) Mercedes	2026 Formula One World Championship
FIA Formula E World Championship	(Germany) Pascal Wehrlein	2025–26 Formula E World Championship
FIA Formula E World Championship	Teams: (United Kingdom) Jaguar Racing	2025–26 Formula E World Championship
FIA Formula E World Championship	Manufacturers: (Germany) Porsche	2025–26 Formula E World Championship
IndyCar Series	(Spain) Álex Palou	2026 IndyCar Series
IndyCar Series	Manufacturers: (Japan) Honda	2026 IndyCar Series
IndyCar Series	Rookies: (Norway) Dennis Hauger	2026 IndyCar Series
Indy NXT	(United States) Nikita Johnson	2026 Indy NXT
Indy NXT	Teams: (United States) Cape Motorsports Powered by ECR	2026 Indy NXT
Indy NXT	Rookies: (United States) Nikita Johnson	2026 Indy NXT
USF Pro 2000 Championship	(United States) Jack Jeffers	2026 USF Pro 2000 Championship
USF Pro 2000 Championship	Teams: (United States) Turn 3 Motorsport	2026 USF Pro 2000 Championship
USF2000 Championship	(Colombia) Sebastián Garzón	2026 USF2000 Championship
USF2000 Championship	Teams: (United States) Pabst Racing	2026 USF2000 Championship
USF Juniors	(Poland) Karol Pasiewicz	2026 USF Juniors
USF Juniors	Teams: (United States) Zanella Racing	2026 USF Juniors
Atlantic Championship	016 Class: (United States) Harbir Dass	2026 Atlantic Championship
Atlantic Championship	Open Class: (United States) Nicho Vardis	2026 Atlantic Championship
Australian Drivers' Championship	(Australia) Harry Strik	2026 Australian Drivers' Championship
Australian Formula Open	(Australia) Alex MacDonald	2026 Australian Formula Open
Australian Formula Ford Championship	(Australia) Seth Burchartz	2026 Australian Formula Ford Championship
F1600 Championship Series	(Canada) Boss Patel	2026 F1600 Championship Series
F2000 Championship Series	(United States) Robert Wright	2026 F2000 Championship Series
F2000 Italian Formula Trophy	(Switzerland) Sandro Zeller	2026 F2000 Italian Formula Trophy
F2000 Italian Formula Trophy	Teams: (Switzerland) Jo Zeller Racing	2026 F2000 Italian Formula Trophy
Formula Nordic	(Sweden) Hampus Varis	2026 Formula Nordic
Indian Racing League	(South Africa) Raoul Hyman (Liechtenstein) Fabienne Wohlwend	2025–26 Indian Racing League
Indian Racing League	Teams: (India) Goa Aces JA Racing	2025–26 Indian Racing League
MRF Formula 2000	(India) Ishaan Madesh	2025–26 MRF Formula 2000 season
New Zealand Formula First Championship	(New Zealand) Chris Symon	2025–26 New Zealand Formula First Championship
New Zealand Formula Ford Championship	(New Zealand) Marco Manson	2025–26 New Zealand Formula Ford Championship
Super Formula Championship	(Japan) Kakunoshin Ohta	2026 Super Formula Championship
Super Formula Championship	Teams: (Japan) Docomo Team Dandelion Racing	2026 Super Formula Championship
Formula 3 / Formula Regional
FIA Formula 3 Championship	(United States) Ugo Ugochukwu	2026 FIA Formula 3 Championship
FIA Formula 3 Championship	Teams: (Spain) Campos Racing	2026 FIA Formula 3 Championship
Formula Regional Americas Championship	(United States) Brady Golan	2026 Formula Regional Americas Championship
Formula Regional Americas Championship	Teams: (United States) Toney Driver Development	2026 Formula Regional Americas Championship
Formula Regional Americas Championship	Rookies: (United States) Evagoras Papasavvas	2026 Formula Regional Americas Championship
Formula Regional Americas Championship	Masters: (United States) Whitney Strickland	2026 Formula Regional Americas Championship
Formula Regional European Championship	(Italy) Emanuele Olivieri	2026 Formula Regional European Championship
Formula Regional European Championship	Teams: (France) R-ace GP	2026 Formula Regional European Championship
Formula Regional European Championship	Rookies: (Italy) Emanuele Olivieri	2026 Formula Regional European Championship
Formula Regional Japanese Championship	(Japan) Ryota Horachi	2026 Formula Regional Japanese Championship
Formula Regional Japanese Championship	Teams: (Japan) Ponos Racing	2026 Formula Regional Japanese Championship
Formula Regional Japanese Championship	Masters: (Japan) Yutaka Toriba	2026 Formula Regional Japanese Championship
Formula Regional Middle East Trophy	(United Kingdom) Kean Nakamura-Berta	2026 Formula Regional Middle East Trophy
Formula Regional Middle East Trophy	Teams: (India) Mumbai Falcons Racing Limited	2026 Formula Regional Middle East Trophy
Formula Regional Middle East Trophy	Rookies: (United Kingdom) Kean Nakamura-Berta	2026 Formula Regional Middle East Trophy
Formula Regional Oceania Trophy	(United States) Ugo Ugochukwu	2026 Formula Regional Oceania Trophy
Formula Regional Oceania Trophy	Teams: (New Zealand) M2 Competition	2026 Formula Regional Oceania Trophy
Formula Regional Oceania Trophy	Rookies: (New Zealand) Ryan Wood	2026 Formula Regional Oceania Trophy
Formula Regional Oceania Trophy	Tasman Cup: (New Zealand) Louis Sharp	2026 Formula Regional Oceania Trophy
Austria Formula Cup	(Switzerland) Sandro Zeller	2026 Austria Formula Cup
Austria Formula Cup	Teams: (Switzerland) Jo Zeller Racing	2026 Austria Formula Cup
Eurocup-3	(United States) James Egozi	2026 Eurocup-3 season
Eurocup-3	Teams: (Spain) Palou Motorsport	2026 Eurocup-3 season
Eurocup-3	Rookies: (Brazil) Heitor Dall'Agnol	2026 Eurocup-3 season
Eurocup-3 Spanish Winter Championship	(United Arab Emirates) Keanu Al Azhari	2026 Eurocup-3 Spanish Winter Championship
Eurocup-3 Spanish Winter Championship	Teams: (Spain) Campos Racing	2026 Eurocup-3 Spanish Winter Championship
Eurocup-3 Spanish Winter Championship	Rookies: (Netherlands) René Lammers	2026 Eurocup-3 Spanish Winter Championship
Euroformula Open Championship	(Chinese Taipei) Enzo Yeh	2026 Euroformula Open Championship
Euroformula Open Championship	Teams: (Germany) Team Motopark	2026 Euroformula Open Championship
Euroformula Open Championship	Rookies: (Poland) Wiktor Dobrzański	2026 Euroformula Open Championship
Formula Pro USA Western Championship	FPUSA-3: (United States) Dan Decker	2026 Formula Pro USA Western Championship
Formula Pro USA Western Championship	FPUSA-3 Teams: (United States) World Speed Motorsports	2026 Formula Pro USA Western Championship
Formula Pro USA Western Championship	FPUSA-4: (Canada) Lucas Hand	2026 Formula Pro USA Western Championship
Formula Pro USA Western Championship	FPUSA-4 Teams: (United States) World Speed Motorsports	2026 Formula Pro USA Western Championship
Formula Pro USA Western Championship	WRS: (United States) Ana Palestro	2026 Formula Pro USA Western Championship
GB3 Championship	(Italy) Nikita Bedrin	2026 GB3 Championship
GB3 Championship	Teams: (United States) VRD Racing	2026 GB3 Championship
Hoosier Formula Cup	(Sweden) Stepan Suslov	2026 Ultimate Cup European Series
Hoosier Formula Cup	Rookies: (Sweden) Stepan Suslov	2026 Ultimate Cup European Series
Hoosier Formula Cup	Gentlemen: (France) Frédéric Boillot	2026 Ultimate Cup European Series
Super Formula Lights	(France) Evan Giltaire	2026 Super Formula Lights
Super Formula Lights	Teams: (Japan) TOM'S	2026 Super Formula Lights
Super Formula Lights	Masters: (Japan) "Ken Alex"	2026 Super Formula Lights
Formula 4
F1 Academy	(United Kingdom) Alisha Palmowski	2026 F1 Academy season
F1 Academy	Teams: (Spain) Campos Racing	2026 F1 Academy season
F4 British Championship	(Belgium) Dries Van Langendonck	2026 F4 British Championship
F4 British Championship	Teams: (United Kingdom) Hitech	2026 F4 British Championship
F4 British Championship	Rookies: (Belgium) Dries Van Langendonck	2026 F4 British Championship
Formula 4 CEZ Championship	(Germany) Elia Weiss	2026 Formula 4 CEZ Championship
Formula 4 CEZ Championship	Teams: (Switzerland) Jenzer Motorsport	2026 Formula 4 CEZ Championship
Formula 4 CEZ Championship	Rookies: (Lithuania) Markas Šilkūnas	2026 Formula 4 CEZ Championship
Formula 4 CEZ Championship	Woman Trophy: (Czech Republic) Ella Häkkinen	2026 Formula 4 CEZ Championship
F4 Chinese Championship	(Russia) Timur Shagaliev	2026 F4 Chinese Championship
F4 Chinese Championship	Teams: (China) CHAMP Academy	2026 F4 Chinese Championship
French F4 Championship	(France) Guillaume Bouzar	2026 French F4 Championship
Italian F4 Championship	(Finland) Luka Sammalisto	2026 Italian F4 Championship
Italian F4 Championship	Teams: (Germany) US Racing	2026 Italian F4 Championship
Italian F4 Championship	Rookies: (United Kingdom) Kenzo Craigie	2026 Italian F4 Championship
Italian F4 Championship	Women: (Austria) Emma Felbermayr	2026 Italian F4 Championship
F4 Japanese Championship	(Japan) Ryo Shirasaki	2026 F4 Japanese Championship
F4 Japanese Championship	Teams: (Japan) Hydrangea Kageyama Racing	2026 F4 Japanese Championship
F4 Japanese Championship	Independent: (Japan) "Hirobon"	2026 F4 Japanese Championship
F4 Japanese Championship	Independent Teams: (Japan) Team 5ZIGEN	2026 F4 Japanese Championship
NACAM Formula 4 Championship	(Mexico) Alejandro Bobadilla	2026 NACAM Formula 4 Championship
NACAM Formula 4 Championship	Teams: (Mexico) Alessandros Racing	2026 NACAM Formula 4 Championship
F4 Spanish Championship	(Netherlands) Kasper Schormans	2026 F4 Spanish Championship
F4 Spanish Championship	Teams: (Netherlands) MP Motorsport	2026 F4 Spanish Championship
F4 Spanish Championship	Rookies: (Netherlands) Kasper Schormans	2026 F4 Spanish Championship
Formula 4 United States Championship	(Uruguay) Gastón Irazú	2026 Formula 4 United States Championship
Formula 4 United States Championship	Teams: (United States) Kiwi Motorsport	2026 Formula 4 United States Championship
AU4 Australian Championship	Gen 2: (Australia) Jensen Marold	2026 AU4 Australian Championship
AU4 Australian Championship	Gen 1: (New Zealand) Jackson Culver	2026 AU4 Australian Championship
E4 Championship	(United Kingdom) Kenzo Craigie	2026 E4 Championship
E4 Championship	Teams: (Italy) Prema Racing	2026 E4 Championship
E4 Championship	Rookies: (United Kingdom) Kenzo Craigie	2026 E4 Championship
Eurocup-4 Spanish Winter Championship	(Portugal) Noah Monteiro	2026 Eurocup-4 Spanish Winter Championship
Eurocup-4 Spanish Winter Championship	Teams: (Spain) Griffin Core	2026 Eurocup-4 Spanish Winter Championship
Eurocup-4 Spanish Winter Championship	Rookies: (Netherlands) Kasper Schormans	2026 Eurocup-4 Spanish Winter Championship
Formula Winter Series	(Belgium) Dries Van Langendonck	2026 Formula Winter Series
Formula Winter Series	Teams: (New Zealand) Rodin Motorsport	2026 Formula Winter Series
Formula Winter Series	Rookies: (Belgium) Dries Van Langendonck	2026 Formula Winter Series
GB4 Championship	(Republic of Ireland) Alex O'Grady	2026 GB4 Championship
GB4 Championship	Teams: (United Kingdom) Elite Motorsport	2026 GB4 Championship
Kyojo Cup	(Japan) Aimi Saito	2026 Kyojo Cup season
Ligier Junior Formula Championship	Gen 1: (United States) Beckham Jacir	2026 Ligier Junior Formula Championship
Ligier Junior Formula Championship	Gen 1 Teams: (United States) Champagne Racing	2026 Ligier Junior Formula Championship
Ligier Junior Formula Championship	Gen 2: (Canada) Edward Kennedy	2026 Ligier Junior Formula Championship
Ligier Junior Formula Championship	Gen 2 Teams: (United States) MLT Motorsports	2026 Ligier Junior Formula Championship
Nordic 4 Championship	(Sweden) Richard Olson	2026 Nordic 4 Championship
Nordic 4 Championship	Danish F4: (Denmark) Matteis Stigsen	2026 Nordic 4 Championship
SMP F4 Championship	(Russia) Ivan Pigaev	2026 SMP F4 Championship
UAE4 Series	(Ukraine) Oleksandr Bondarev	2026 UAE4 Series
UAE4 Series	Teams: (France) R-ace GP	2026 UAE4 Series
UAE4 Series	Rookies: (United Kingdom) Kenzo Craigie	2026 UAE4 Series

== Powerboat racing ==
Series	Champion	Refer
UIM E1 World Championship	(Finland) Emma Kimiläinen (United Kingdom) Sam Coleman	2026 E1 Series Championship
UIM E1 World Championship	Teams: (United States) Team Brady	2026 E1 Series Championship

== Rallying ==
Series	Champion	Refer
FIA World Rally Championship	(United Kingdom) Elfyn Evans	2026 World Rally Championship
FIA World Rally Championship	Co-Drivers: (United Kingdom) Scott Martin	2026 World Rally Championship
FIA World Rally Championship	Manufacturers: (Japan) Toyota Gazoo Racing WRT	2026 World Rally Championship
FIA WRC2 Championship	(Estonia) Robert Virves	2026 WRC2 Championship
FIA WRC2 Championship	Co-Drivers: (Estonia) Jakko Viilo	2026 WRC2 Championship
FIA WRC2 Championship	Teams: (Italy) Lancia Corse HF	2026 WRC2 Championship
FIA WRC2 Championship	Challenger: (Estonia) Robert Virves	2026 WRC2 Championship
FIA WRC2 Championship	Challenger Co-Drivers: (Estonia) Jakko Viilo	2026 WRC2 Championship
FIA WRC3 Championship	(Italy) Matteo Fontana	2026 WRC3 Championship
FIA WRC3 Championship	Co-Drivers: (Italy) Alessandro Arnaboldi	2026 WRC3 Championship
FIA Junior WRC Championship	(Turkey) Ali Türkkan	2026 Junior WRC Championship
FIA Junior WRC Championship	Co-Drivers: (Turkey) Oytun Albayrak	2026 Junior WRC Championship
British Rally Championship	(United Kingdom) Osian Pryce	2026 British Rally Championship
British Rally Championship	Co-Drivers: (United Kingdom) James Morgan	2026 British Rally Championship
Deutsche Rallye Meisterschaft	(Germany) Marijan Griebel	2026 Deutsche Rallye Meisterschaft
Deutsche Rallye Meisterschaft	Co-Drivers: (Germany) Ella Kremer	2026 Deutsche Rallye Meisterschaft
European Rally Championship	(Finland) Teemu Suninen	2026 European Rally Championship
European Rally Championship	Co-Drivers: (Finland) Antti Haapala	2026 European Rally Championship
European Rally Championship	Teams: (India) Team MRF Tyres	2026 European Rally Championship
European Rally Championship	ERC3: (Finland) Ville Vatanen	2026 European Rally Championship
European Rally Championship	ERC3 Co-Drivers: (Finland) Joonas Ojala	2026 European Rally Championship
European Rally Championship	ERC4: (Germany) Timo Schulz	2026 European Rally Championship
European Rally Championship	ERC4 Co-Drivers: (Germany) Maresa Lade	2026 European Rally Championship
European Rally Championship	Junior ERC: (Germany) Timo Schulz	2026 European Rally Championship
European Rally Championship	Master ERC: (Italy) Giandomenico Basso	2026 European Rally Championship
European Rally Championship	Fiesta Rally 3 Trophy: (Finland) Ville Vatanen	2026 European Rally Championship
New Zealand Rally Championship	(New Zealand) Jack Hawkeswood	2026 New Zealand Rally Championship
New Zealand Rally Championship	Co-Drivers: (New Zealand) Jason Farmer	2026 New Zealand Rally Championship
Scottish Rally Championship	(United Kingdom) Garry Pearson	2026 Scottish Rally Championship
Scottish Rally Championship	Co-Drivers: (United Kingdom) Chris Lees	2026 Scottish Rally Championship

=== Rallycross ===
Series	Champion	Refer
FIA European Rallycross Championship	RX1: (Sweden) Johan Kristoffersson	2026 FIA European Rallycross Championship
FIA European Rallycross Championship	RX3: (Lithuania) Rytis Gurklys	2026 FIA European Rallycross Championship
FIA European Rallycross Championship	RX4: (France) Andréa Bénézet	2026 FIA European Rallycross Championship
FIA European Rallycross Championship	RX5: (Estonia) Armin Raag	2026 FIA European Rallycross Championship

== Sports car and GT ==
Series	Champion	Refer
FIA World Endurance Championship	Hypercar: (Switzerland) Sébastien Buemi; Hypercar: (New Zealand) Brendon Hartley; Hypercar: (Japan) Ryō Hirakawa	2026 FIA World Endurance Championship
FIA World Endurance Championship	Hypercar Manufacturers: (Japan) Toyota	2026 FIA World Endurance Championship
FIA World Endurance Championship	LMGT3: (United Kingdom) Jonny Edgar	2026 FIA World Endurance Championship
FIA World Endurance Championship	LMGT3 Teams: (United Kingdom) #33 TF Sport	2026 FIA World Endurance Championship
24H Series	GT3: (Germany) Pierre Kaffer; GT3: (Germany) Elia Erhart; GT3: (France) Stephane Tribaudini	2026 24H Series
24H Series	GT3 Teams: (France) #18 Saintéloc Junior Team	2026 24H Series
24H Series	GT3 Pro-Am: (Germany) Pierre Kaffer; GT3 Pro-Am: (Germany) Elia Erhart; GT3 Pro-Am: (France) Stephane Tribaudini	2026 24H Series
24H Series	GT3 Pro-Am Teams: (France) #18 Saintéloc Junior Team	2026 24H Series
24H Series	GT3 Am: (Germany) Torsten Kratz; GT3 Am: (Switzerland) Michael Kroll; GT3 Am: (Germany) Alexander Prinz	2026 24H Series
24H Series	GT3 Am Teams: (Switzerland) #11 Hofor Racing	2026 24H Series
24H Series	992: (Estonia) Martin Rump; 992: (Denmark) Conrad Tox Leveau	2026 24H Series
24H Series	992 Teams: (Belgium) #921 Mühlner Motorsport	2026 24H Series
24H Series	992 Am: (Portugal) Igor Sorokin; 992 Am: (Republic of Ireland) Jonathan Kearney; 992 Am: (United Kingdom) Steven Gambrell	2026 24H Series
24H Series	992 Am Teams: (Germany) #928 HRT Performance	2026 24H Series
24H Series	GTX: (France) Philippe Bonnel	2026 24H Series
24H Series	GTX Teams: (France) #701 Vortex V8	2026 24H Series
24H Series	GT4: (Netherlands) Johan de Rouw	2026 24H Series
24H Series	GT4 Teams: (Netherlands) #483 CP Motorsport	2026 24H Series
24H Series	TCE: (Italy) Filippo Tornaghi; TCE: (Italy) Gino Rocchio	2026 24H Series
24H Series	TCE Teams: (Italy) #114 Not Only Motorsport	2026 24H Series
24H Series	TCX: (Italy) Filippo Tornaghi; TCX: (Italy) Gino Rocchio	2026 24H Series
24H Series	TCX Teams: (Italy) #114 Not Only Motorsport	2026 24H Series
24H Series Middle East	GT3: (United States) Anthony McIntosh	2025–26 24H Series Middle East
24H Series Middle East	GT3 Teams: (Belgium) #669 Team WRT	2025–26 24H Series Middle East
24H Series Middle East	GT3 Pro-Am: (Germany) Ralf Bohn	2025–26 24H Series Middle East
24H Series Middle East	GT3 Pro-Am Teams: (Germany) #269 Herberth Motorsport	2025–26 24H Series Middle East
24H Series Middle East	GT3 Am: (Germany) Alex Aka; GT3 Am: (Cyprus) Vasily Vladykin	2025–26 24H Series Middle East
24H Series Middle East	GT3 Am Teams: (United Arab Emirates) #69 Continental Racing with Simpson Motorsport	2025–26 24H Series Middle East
24H Series Middle East	992: (France) Stephane Perrin; 992: (United Kingdom) Anthony Vince	2025–26 24H Series Middle East
24H Series Middle East	992 Teams: (France) #888 SebLajoux Racing	2025–26 24H Series Middle East
24H Series Middle East	992 Am: (France) Stephane Perrin; 992 Am: (France) Louis Perrot; 992 Am: (United Kingdom) Anthony Vince	2025–26 24H Series Middle East
24H Series Middle East	992 Am Teams: (France) #888 SebLajoux Racing	2025–26 24H Series Middle East
24H Series Middle East	GTX: (United Kingdom) Mike Simpson; GTX: (United Kingdom) Jack Mitchell	2025–26 24H Series Middle East
24H Series Middle East	GTX Teams: (France) #795 Team CMR	2025–26 24H Series Middle East
24H Series Middle East	GT4: Ivan Krapivtsev; GT4: (Germany) Florian Sternkopf; GT4: (France) Joshua Bednarski	2025–26 24H Series Middle East
24H Series Middle East	GT4 Teams: (Germany) #445 Cerny Motorsport	2025–26 24H Series Middle East
24H Series Middle East	TCE: (Germany) Pia Ohlsson	2025–26 24H Series Middle East
24H Series Middle East	TCE Teams: (Germany) #102 asBest Racing	2025–26 24H Series Middle East
24H Series Middle East	TCX: (Germany) Pia Ohlsson	2025–26 24H Series Middle East
24H Series Middle East	TCX Teams: (Germany) #102 asBest Racing	2025–26 24H Series Middle East
ADAC GT Masters	(Switzerland) Felix Hirsiger (Germany) Finn Zulauf	2026 ADAC GT Masters
ADAC GT Masters	Teams: (Germany) FK Performance Motorsport	2026 ADAC GT Masters
ADAC GT Masters	Silver Cup: (Switzerland) Felix Hirsiger; Silver Cup: (Germany) Finn Zulauf	2026 ADAC GT Masters
ADAC GT4 Germany	(Australia) Lachlan Robinson (Germany) Denny Berndt	2026 ADAC GT4 Germany
ADAC GT4 Germany	Teams: (Germany) AVIA W&S Motorsport	2026 ADAC GT4 Germany
ADAC GT4 Germany	Pro-Am: (United States) Tim Horrell; Pro-Am: (Germany) Hendrik Still	2026 ADAC GT4 Germany
ADAC GT4 Germany	Junior: (Australia) Lachlan Robinson; Junior: (Germany) Denny Berndt	2026 ADAC GT4 Germany
ADAC GT4 Germany	Rookies: (Netherlands) Lukas Stiefelhagen	2026 ADAC GT4 Germany
Asian Le Mans Series	LMP2: (Switzerland) Louis Delétraz; LMP2: (Denmark) Malthe Jakobsen; LMP2: (United States) George Kurtz	2025–26 Asian Le Mans Series
Asian Le Mans Series	LMP2 Teams: (United States) #4 CrowdStrike Racing by APR	2025–26 Asian Le Mans Series
Asian Le Mans Series	LMP3: (United States) Alexander Jacoby; LMP3: (France) Paul Lanchère; LMP3: (Switzerland) Kévin Rabin	2025–26 Asian Le Mans Series
Asian Le Mans Series	LMP3 Teams: (Switzerland) #17 CLX Motorsport	2025–26 Asian Le Mans Series
Asian Le Mans Series	GT: (United States) Dustin Blattner; GT: (United Kingdom) Chris Lulham; GT: (Germany) Dennis Marschall	2025–26 Asian Le Mans Series
Asian Le Mans Series	GT Teams: (Switzerland) #74 Kessel Racing	2025–26 Asian Le Mans Series
Aussie Racing Cars	(Australia) Anthony DiMauro	2026 Aussie Racing Car Series
Aussie Racing Cars	Rookies: (Australia) Rossi Johnson	2026 Aussie Racing Car Series
Aussie Racing Cars	Masters: (Australia) Cody McKay	2026 Aussie Racing Car Series
Aussie Racing Cars	Gold Cup: (Australia) Jeff Waters	2026 Aussie Racing Car Series
Australian National Trans-Am Series	(Australia) Nathan Herne	2026 Australian National Trans Am Series
Belcar Endurance Championship	(Netherlands) Paul Meijer (Belgium) Dylan Derdaele (Belgium) Nicolas Saelens	2026 Belcar Endurance Championship
British GT Championship	GT3: (United Kingdom) Marcus Clutton; GT3: (United Kingdom) Simon Orange	2026 British GT Championship
British GT Championship	GT3 Pro-Am: (United Kingdom) Marcus Clutton; GT3 Pro-Am: (United Kingdom) Simon Orange	2026 British GT Championship
British GT Championship	GT3 Silver-Am: (United Kingdom) Alex Martin; GT3 Silver-Am: (South Africa) Jarrod Waberski	2026 British GT Championship
British GT Championship	GT4: (United Kingdom) Darren Turner; GT4: (United Kingdom) Daniel Lavery	2026 British GT Championship
British GT Championship	GT4 Pro-Am: (United Kingdom) Darren Turner; GT4 Pro-Am: (United Kingdom) Daniel Lavery	2026 British GT Championship
British GT Championship	GT4 Silver: (United Kingdom) Jessica Hawkins; GT4 Silver: (United Kingdom) Will Orton	2026 British GT Championship
British GT Championship	Masters: (United Kingdom) Rob Collard	2026 British GT Championship
British GT Championship	SRO GT Academy: (South Africa) Jarrod Waberski	2026 British GT Championship
British GT Championship	Teams: (United Kingdom) Barwell Motorsport	2026 British GT Championship
Deutsche Tourenwagen Masters	(Austria) Thomas Preining	2026 Deutsche Tourenwagen Masters
Deutsche Tourenwagen Masters	Teams: (Germany) Manthey Racing	2026 Deutsche Tourenwagen Masters
Deutsche Tourenwagen Masters	Manufacturers: (Germany) Mercedes-AMG	2026 Deutsche Tourenwagen Masters
Deutsche Tourenwagen Masters	Rookie of the Year: (Germany) Tom Kalender	2026 Deutsche Tourenwagen Masters
European Le Mans Series	LMP2: (United Kingdom) Ben Hanley; LMP2: (Australia) Griffin Peebles; LMP2: (Switzerland) Grégoire Saucy	2026 European Le Mans Series
European Le Mans Series	LMP2 Teams: (United Kingdom) #22 United Autosports	2026 European Le Mans Series
European Le Mans Series	LMP2 Pro-Am: (Denmark) Malthe Jakobsen; LMP2 Pro-Am: (Denmark) Michael Jensen; LMP2 Pro-Am: (Italy) Enzo Trulli	2026 European Le Mans Series
European Le Mans Series	LMP2 Pro-Am Teams: (Portugal) #20 Algarve Pro Racing	2026 European Le Mans Series
European Le Mans Series	LMP3: (France) Paul Lanchère; LMP3: (Brazil) Alexander Jacoby	2026 European Le Mans Series
European Le Mans Series	LMP3 Teams: (Switzerland) #17 CLX Motorsport	2026 European Le Mans Series
European Le Mans Series	LMGT3: (Republic of Ireland) Charlie Eastwood; LMGT3: (United States) Blake McDonald; LMGT3: (United States) Alec Udell	2026 European Le Mans Series
European Le Mans Series	LMGT3 Teams: (United Kingdom) #33 TF Sport	2026 European Le Mans Series
French GT4 Cup	(France) Léo Jousset (France) Rudy Servol	2026 French GT4 Cup
French GT4 Cup	Teams: (France) Akkodis ASP Team	2026 French GT4 Cup
French GT4 Cup	Am: (France) Stéphane Auriacombe; Am: (Belgium) Stéphane Lémeret	2026 French GT4 Cup
French GT4 Cup	Am Teams: (France) CMR	2026 French GT4 Cup
French GT4 Cup	Ginetta GTA: (France) Philippe Marie; Ginetta GTA: (France) Léo Poncel	2026 French GT4 Cup
French GT4 Cup	Ginetta GTA Teams: (France) CMR	2026 French GT4 Cup
French GT4 Cup	Alpine Elf Cup: (France) Romain Monti; Alpine Elf Cup: (France) Rodolphe Wallgren	2026 French GT4 Cup
French GT4 Cup	Alpine Elf Cup Teams: (France) Chazel Technologie Course	2026 French GT4 Cup
Ginetta Junior Championship	(United Kingdom) Lewis Goff	2026 Ginetta Junior Championship
Ginetta Junior Championship	Teams: (United Kingdom) R Racing	2026 Ginetta Junior Championship
GR Cup	(Australia) Cooper Barnes	2026 GR Cup
GR86 Championship New Zealand	(New Zealand) Chris White	2025–26 Toyota GR86 Championship
GT America Series	SRO3: (Mexico) Memo Gidley	2026 GT America Series
GT America Series	SRO3 Teams: (United States) SKI Autosports	2026 GT America Series
GT America Series	GT2: (United Kingdom) Lawrence Tomlinson	2026 GT America Series
GT America Series	GT2 Teams: (United Kingdom) Team LNT	2026 GT America Series
GT America Series	GT4: (United States) Craig Lumsden	2026 GT America Series
GT America Series	GT4 Teams: (United States) Flying Lizard Motorsports	2026 GT America Series
GT America Series	GT Cup: (United States) David Lecko	2026 GT America Series
GT America Series	GT Cup Teams: (United States) RacingSupport	2026 GT America Series
GT Cup Open Europe	(Netherlands) Jurriaan de Back (Netherlands) Paul Meijer	2026 GT Cup Open Europe
GT Cup Open Europe	Teams: (Netherlands) Hans Weijs Motorsport	2026 GT Cup Open Europe
GT Cup Open Europe	Silver: (Netherlands) Jurriann de Back; Silver: (Netherlands) Paul Meijer	2026 GT Cup Open Europe
GT Cup Open Europe	Pro-Am: (Spain) Alejandro Barambio; Pro-Am: (Spain) Borja García	2026 GT Cup Open Europe
GT Cup Open Europe	Am: (Brazil) Leandro Martins; Am: (Austria) Dieter Svepes	2026 GT Cup Open Europe
GT Winter Series	(Germany) Kenneth Heyer (Germany) Jay Mo Härtling	2026 GT Winter Series
GT Winter Series	Teams: (Germany) SR Motorsport by Schnitzelalm	2026 GT Winter Series
GT Winter Series	GT3: (Germany) Kenneth Heyer; GT3: (Germany) Jay Mo Härtling	2026 GT Winter Series
GT Winter Series	Cup 1: (United Kingdom) Sean Ran; Cup 1: (United Kingdom) Josh Steed	2026 GT Winter Series
GT Winter Series	Cup 2: (Poland) Igor Klaja	2026 GT Winter Series
GT Winter Series	Cup 4: (Serbia) Petar Matić	2026 GT Winter Series
GT World Challenge America	Pro: (United States) Robby Foley; Pro: (United States) Justin Rothberg	2026 GT World Challenge America
GT World Challenge America	Pro Teams: (United States) Turner Motorsport	2026 GT World Challenge America
GT World Challenge America	Pro-Am: (United States) Kyle Washington	2026 GT World Challenge America
GT World Challenge America	Pro-Am Teams: (United States) GMG Racing	2026 GT World Challenge America
GT World Challenge America	Am: (United States) Jay Schreibman	2026 GT World Challenge America
GT World Challenge America	Am Teams: (Italy) AF Corse USA	2026 GT World Challenge America
GT World Challenge America	SRO GT Academy: (New Zealand) Ryan Yardley	2026 GT World Challenge America
GT World Challenge America	Manufacturers: (Germany) Porsche	2026 GT World Challenge America
GT World Challenge Asia	(China) Lü Wei	2026 GT World Challenge Asia
GT World Challenge Asia	Teams: (Hong Kong) Absolute Racing	2026 GT World Challenge Asia
GT World Challenge Asia	Pro-Am: (China) Lü Wei	2026 GT World Challenge Asia
GT World Challenge Asia	Silver Cup: (China) Cheng Congfu; Silver Cup: (China) Yu Kuai	2026 GT World Challenge Asia
GT World Challenge Asia	Silver-Am Cup: (Chinese Taipei) Brian Lee; Silver-Am Cup: (Netherlands) Maxime Oosten	2026 GT World Challenge Asia
GT World Challenge Asia	Am Cup: (Indonesia) Setiawan Santoso; Am Cup: (China) Zhou Bihuang	2026 GT World Challenge Asia
GT World Challenge Asia	China Cup: Cheng Congfu; China Cup: Yu Kuai	2026 GT World Challenge Asia
GT World Challenge Asia	SRO GT Academy: (China) Yu Kuai	2026 GT World Challenge Asia
GT World Challenge Europe	(Austria) Lucas Auer (Germany) Maro Engel	2026 GT World Challenge Europe
GT World Challenge Europe	Teams: (Belgium) Team WRT	2026 GT World Challenge Europe
GT World Challenge Europe	Gold Cup: (United Kingdom) Tom Fleming; Gold Cup: (Monaco) Louis Prette	2026 GT World Challenge Europe
GT World Challenge Europe	Gold Cup Teams: (Italy) AF Corse	2026 GT World Challenge Europe
GT World Challenge Europe	Silver Cup: (Belgium) Matisse Lismont; Silver Cup: (Argentina) Ignacio Montenegro	2026 GT World Challenge Europe
GT World Challenge Europe	Silver Cup Teams: (Belgium) Team WRT	2026 GT World Challenge Europe
GT World Challenge Europe	Bronze Cup: (Germany) Dennis Marschall	2026 GT World Challenge Europe
GT World Challenge Europe	Bronze Cup Teams: (Switzerland) Kessel Racing	2026 GT World Challenge Europe
GT World Challenge Europe Endurance Cup	(Austria) Lucas Auer (Germany) Maro Engel (Germany) Luca Stolz	2026 GT World Challenge Europe Endurance Cup
GT World Challenge Europe Endurance Cup	Teams: (United States) Winward Racing	2026 GT World Challenge Europe Endurance Cup
GT World Challenge Europe Endurance Cup	Gold Cup: (Belgium) Ugo de Wilde; Gold Cup: (Germany) Jens Klingmann; Gold Cup: (Germany) Tim Tramnitz	2026 GT World Challenge Europe Endurance Cup
GT World Challenge Europe Endurance Cup	Gold Cup Teams: (Germany) Rowe Racing	2026 GT World Challenge Europe Endurance Cup
GT World Challenge Europe Endurance Cup	Silver Cup: (Belgium) Amaury Cordeel; Silver Cup: (Belgium) Matisse Lismont; Silver Cup: (Argentina) Ignacio Montenegro	2026 GT World Challenge Europe Endurance Cup
GT World Challenge Europe Endurance Cup	Silver Cup Teams: (Belgium) Team WRT	2026 GT World Challenge Europe Endurance Cup
GT World Challenge Europe Endurance Cup	Bronze Cup: (Germany) Dennis Marschall	2026 GT World Challenge Europe Endurance Cup
GT World Challenge Europe Endurance Cup	Bronze Cup Teams: (Switzerland) Kessel Racing	2026 GT World Challenge Europe Endurance Cup
GT World Challenge Europe Sprint Cup	(Denmark) Bastian Buus (Switzerland) Ricardo Feller	2026 GT World Challenge Europe Sprint Cup
GT World Challenge Europe Sprint Cup	Teams: (Belgium) Team WRT	2026 GT World Challenge Europe Sprint Cup
GT World Challenge Europe Sprint Cup	Gold Cup: (Italy) Tommaso Mosca; Gold Cup: (Peru) Matías Zagazeta	2026 GT World Challenge Europe Sprint Cup
GT World Challenge Europe Sprint Cup	Gold Cup Teams: (Italy) AF Corse	2026 GT World Challenge Europe Sprint Cup
GT World Challenge Europe Sprint Cup	Silver Cup: (Belgium) Matisse Lismont; Silver Cup: (Argentina) Ignacio Montenegro	2026 GT World Challenge Europe Sprint Cup
GT World Challenge Europe Sprint Cup	Silver Cup Teams: (Belgium) Team WRT	2026 GT World Challenge Europe Sprint Cup
GT World Challenge Europe Sprint Cup	Bronze Cup: (Italy) Eddie Cheever III; Bronze Cup: (Republic of Ireland) Peter Dempsey	2026 GT World Challenge Europe Sprint Cup
GT World Challenge Europe Sprint Cup	Bronze Cup Teams: (United Kingdom) Ziggo Sport – Tempesta Racing	2026 GT World Challenge Europe Sprint Cup
GT2 European Series	Silver: (France) Ethan Gialdini; Silver: (Denmark) Mikkel Njor	2026 GT2 European Series
GT2 European Series	Silver Teams: (France) CMR	2026 GT2 European Series
GT2 European Series	Pro-Am: (Germany) Jay Mo Härtling; Pro-Am: (United States) David Thilenius	2026 GT2 European Series
GT2 European Series	Pro-Am Teams: (Germany) SR Motorsport by Schnitzelalm	2026 GT2 European Series
GT2 European Series	Masters: (Monaco) Philippe Prette	2026 GT2 European Series
GT2 European Series	Masters Teams: (Czech Republic) RTR Projects	2026 GT2 European Series
GT2 European Series	SRO GT Academy: (Germany) Jay Mo Härtling	2026 GT2 European Series
GT3 Revival Series	Pro-Am: (France) Jean-Luc Beaubélique	2026 GT3 Revival Series
GT3 Revival Series	Am Gen 1: (France) Éric Debard	2026 GT3 Revival Series
GT3 Revival Series	Am Gen 2: (Germany) Heiko Neumann	2026 GT3 Revival Series
GT4 America Series	Silver: (United States) Luca Mars; Silver: (United States) Spencer Pumpelly	2026 GT4 America Series
GT4 America Series	Silver Teams: (United States) RS1	2026 GT4 America Series
GT4 America Series	Pro-Am: (United States) Sam Craven	2026 GT4 America Series
GT4 America Series	Pro-Am Teams: (United States) Random Vandals Racing	2026 GT4 America Series
GT4 America Series	Am: (United States) Frankie Muniz; Am: (United States) Tyler Stone	2026 GT4 America Series
GT4 America Series	Am Teams: (United States) TechSport Racing	2026 GT4 America Series
GT4 Australia Series	Silver: (Australia) Tom Hayman; Silver: (Australia) Jett Murray	2026 GT4 Australia Series
GT4 Australia Series	Silver Am: (Indonesia) Glenn Nirwan; Silver Am: (Australia) Zac Soutar	2026 GT4 Australia Series
GT4 Australia Series	Am: (Australia) Nathan Callaghan; Am: (Australia) Chris Lillis	2026 GT4 Australia Series
GT4 Australia Series	Teams: (Australia) Method Motorsport	2026 GT4 Australia Series
GT4 European Series	Silver: (United Kingdom) McKenzy Cresswell; Silver: (United Kingdom) Charlie Hart	2026 GT4 European Series
GT4 European Series	Silver Teams: (United Kingdom) Elite Motorsport with Entire Race Engineering	2026 GT4 European Series
GT4 European Series	Pro-Am: (Sweden) Victor Bouveng; Pro-Am: (Sweden) Joakim Walde	2026 GT4 European Series
GT4 European Series	Pro-Am Teams: (Germany) Schubert Motorsport	2026 GT4 European Series
GT4 European Series	Am: (Germany) Daniel Blickle; Am: (Germany) Max Kronberg	2026 GT4 European Series
GT4 European Series	Am Teams: (Germany) W&S Motorsport	2026 GT4 European Series
GT4 Italian Series	Pro-Am: (Italy) Giacomo Maman; Pro-Am: (Italy) Gustavo Sandrucci	2026 GT4 Italian Series
GT4 Italian Series	Am: (Italy) Mauro Trentin; Am: (Italy) Riccardo Luca Wagner	2026 GT4 Italian Series
GT4 Italian Series	Teams: (Italy) Casals Motorsport	2026 GT4 Italian Series
GT4 Winter Series	(Germany) Enrico Förderer (Germany) Joel Mesch	2026 GT4 Winter Series
GT4 Winter Series	Teams: (Germany) SR Motorsport by Schnitzelalm	2026 GT4 Winter Series
GT4 Winter Series	Pro: (Germany) Enrico Förderer; Pro: (Germany) Joel Mesch	2026 GT4 Winter Series
GT4 Winter Series	Pro-Am: (United Kingdom) Ravi Ramyead; Pro-Am: (United Kingdom) Charlie Robertson	2026 GT4 Winter Series
GT4 Winter Series	Am: (Germany) Joachim Bölting	2026 GT4 Winter Series
GT4 Winter Series	Cayman Trophy: (Germany) Franz Linden; Cayman Trophy: (Germany) Arne Hoffmeister	2026 GT4 Winter Series
GT4 Winter Series	Club: (Germany) Thilo Goos	2026 GT4 Winter Series
IMSA Ford Mustang Challenge	Dark Horse: (United States) Cole Loftsgard	2026 IMSA Ford Mustang Challenge
IMSA Ford Mustang Challenge	Dark Horse Legends: (United States) Tom Tait	2026 IMSA Ford Mustang Challenge
IMSA SportsCar Championship	GTP: (United Kingdom) Jack Aitken	2026 IMSA SportsCar Championship
IMSA SportsCar Championship	GTP Teams: (United States) #31 Cadillac Whelen	2026 IMSA SportsCar Championship
IMSA SportsCar Championship	GTP Manufacturers: (United States) Cadillac	2026 IMSA SportsCar Championship
IMSA SportsCar Championship	LMP2: (United States) George Kurtz; LMP2: (United Kingdom) Alex Quinn	2026 IMSA SportsCar Championship
IMSA SportsCar Championship	LMP2 Teams: (United States) #04 CrowdStrike Racing by APR	2026 IMSA SportsCar Championship
IMSA SportsCar Championship	GTD Pro: (United States) Connor De Phillippi; GTD Pro: (United States) Neil Verhagen	2026 IMSA SportsCar Championship
IMSA SportsCar Championship	GTD Pro Teams: (United States) #1 Paul Miller Racing	2026 IMSA SportsCar Championship
IMSA SportsCar Championship	GTD Pro Manufacturers: (United States) Chevrolet	2026 IMSA SportsCar Championship
IMSA SportsCar Championship	GTD: (Switzerland) Philip Ellis; GTD: (United States) Russell Ward	2026 IMSA SportsCar Championship
IMSA SportsCar Championship	GTD Teams: (United States) #57 Winward Racing	2026 IMSA SportsCar Championship
IMSA SportsCar Championship	GTD Manufacturers: (Germany) Mercedes-AMG	2026 IMSA SportsCar Championship
IMSA VP Racing SportsCar Challenge	LMP3: (Colombia) Óscar Tunjo	2026 IMSA VP Racing SportsCar Challenge
IMSA VP Racing SportsCar Challenge	LMP3 Teams: (Germany) #1 Gebhardt Motorsport	2026 IMSA VP Racing SportsCar Challenge
IMSA VP Racing SportsCar Challenge	LMP3 Sprint: (Colombia) Óscar Tunjo	2026 IMSA VP Racing SportsCar Challenge
IMSA VP Racing SportsCar Challenge	LMP3 Sprint Teams: (Germany) #1 Gebhardt Motorsport	2026 IMSA VP Racing SportsCar Challenge
IMSA VP Racing SportsCar Challenge	LMP3 Endurance: (United States) Ari Balogh; LMP3 Endurance: (Canada) Garett Grist	2026 IMSA VP Racing SportsCar Challenge
IMSA VP Racing SportsCar Challenge	LMP3 Endurance Teams: (United States) #30 Toney Driver Development	2026 IMSA VP Racing SportsCar Challenge
IMSA VP Racing SportsCar Challenge	LMP3 Bronze: (Canada) Travis Hill	2026 IMSA VP Racing SportsCar Challenge
IMSA VP Racing SportsCar Challenge	GSX: (United States) Westin Workman	2026 IMSA VP Racing SportsCar Challenge
IMSA VP Racing SportsCar Challenge	GSX Teams: (United States) #8 RAFA Racing Team	2026 IMSA VP Racing SportsCar Challenge
IMSA VP Racing SportsCar Challenge	GSX Manufacturers: (Japan) Toyota	2026 IMSA VP Racing SportsCar Challenge
IMSA VP Racing SportsCar Challenge	GSX Bronze: (Canada) Jon Brel	2026 IMSA VP Racing SportsCar Challenge
Intercontinental GT Challenge	(Belgium) Maxime Martin	2026 Intercontinental GT Challenge
Intercontinental GT Challenge	Manufacturers: (Germany) Porsche	2026 Intercontinental GT Challenge
Intercontinental GT Challenge	Independent Cup: (China) Kerong Li	2026 Intercontinental GT Challenge
International GT Open	(United Kingdom) Tom Emson (United Kingdom) Tom Lebbon	2026 International GT Open
International GT Open	Teams: (United Kingdom) Greystone GT	2026 International GT Open
International GT Open	Pro-Am: (United Kingdom) Charles Bateman	2026 International GT Open
International GT Open	Am: (Dominican Republic) Joel Monegro Reyes	2026 International GT Open
Italian GT Championship Endurance Cup	(Italy) Alessandro Balzan (United States) Dylan Medler	2026 Italian GT Championship Endurance Cup
Italian GT Championship Endurance Cup	Teams: (Italy) VSR	2026 Italian GT Championship Endurance Cup
Italian GT Championship Endurance Cup	Pro-Am: (Spain) Rafael Durán; Pro-Am: (South Africa) David Perel	2026 Italian GT Championship Endurance Cup
Italian GT Championship Endurance Cup	Am: (Italy) Leonardo Gorini; Am: (Italy) Massimo Perrina	2026 Italian GT Championship Endurance Cup
Italian GT Championship Sprint Cup	(Germany) Jens Klingmann	2026 Italian GT Championship Sprint Cup
Italian GT Championship Sprint Cup	Teams: (Italy) BMW Italia Ceccato Racing	2026 Italian GT Championship Sprint Cup
Italian GT Championship Sprint Cup	Pro-Am: (Italy) Francesco Braschi; Pro-Am: (Belgium) Jef Machiels	2026 Italian GT Championship Sprint Cup
Italian GT Championship Sprint Cup	Am: (Italy) Fabrizio Fontana; Am: (Italy) Stefano Gai	2026 Italian GT Championship Sprint Cup
Legend Cars Australia Championship	(Australia) Dylan Thomas	Legend Cars Australia Championship
Le Mans Cup	LMP3: (Singapore) Danial Frost; LMP3: (France) Enzo Peugeot	2026 Le Mans Cup
Le Mans Cup	LMP3 Teams: (France) #85 R-ace GP	2026 Le Mans Cup
Le Mans Cup	LMP3 Pro-Am: (Belgium) Eric De Doncker; LMP3 Pro-Am: (France) Gillian Henrion	2026 Le Mans Cup
Le Mans Cup	LMP3 Pro-Am Teams: (Belgium) #98 Motorsport98	2026 Le Mans Cup
Le Mans Cup	GT3: (Austria) Philipp Sager	2026 Le Mans Cup
Le Mans Cup	GT3 Teams: (France) #10 Racing Spirit of Léman	2026 Le Mans Cup
Ligier European Series	JS P4: (Australia) Alex Gardner; JS P4: (Austria) Simon Schranz	2026 Ligier European Series
Ligier European Series	JS2 R: (France) Antonin Bernard; JS2 R: (Spain) Daniel Dallakyan	2026 Ligier European Series
Mazda MX-5 Cup	(United States) Bobby Gossett	2026 Mazda MX-5 Cup
Mazda MX-5 Cup Benelux	(Netherlands) Delano de Ketele	2026 Mazda MX-5 Cup Benelux
Mazda MX-5 Cup Benelux	Rookies: (Netherlands) Christiaan De Kleijn	2026 Mazda MX-5 Cup Benelux
McLaren Trophy America	Pro: (United States) Tanner Harvey; Pro: (United States) Patrick Liddy	2026 McLaren Trophy America
McLaren Trophy America	Teams: (United States) Forte Racing	2026 McLaren Trophy America
McLaren Trophy America	Pro-Am: (United States) Ryan James; Pro-Am: (United Kingdom) Oliver Webb	2026 McLaren Trophy America
McLaren Trophy America	Am: (United States) Cooper Broll	2026 McLaren Trophy America
McLaren Trophy America	Papaya Cup Pro-Am: (United States) Randy Highland	2026 McLaren Trophy America
McLaren Trophy America	Papaya Cup Am: (United States) Deniz Teoman	2026 McLaren Trophy America
McLaren Trophy Europe	Pro: (United Kingdom) Callum Davies; Pro: (Denmark) Luca Magnussen	2026 McLaren Trophy Europe
McLaren Trophy Europe	Pro-Am: (Sweden) Erik Behrens; Pro-Am: (Spain) Alejandro Geppert	2026 McLaren Trophy Europe
McLaren Trophy Europe	Am: (United Kingdom) Charlie Martin	2026 McLaren Trophy Europe
McLaren Trophy Europe	Papaya Cup: (Portugal) David Coelho	2026 McLaren Trophy Europe
McLaren Trophy Europe	Teams: (Spain) SMC Motorsport	2026 McLaren Trophy Europe
Michelin Pilot Challenge	GS: (United States) Austin Krainz; GS: (United Kingdom) Stevan McAleer	2026 Michelin Pilot Challenge
Michelin Pilot Challenge	GS Teams: (United States) #27 Auto Technic Racing	2026 Michelin Pilot Challenge
Michelin Pilot Challenge	GS Manufacturers: (Germany) BMW	2026 Michelin Pilot Challenge
Michelin Pilot Challenge	TCR: (United States) Mason Filippi; TCR: (United States) Bryson Morris	2026 Michelin Pilot Challenge
Michelin Pilot Challenge	TCR Teams: (United States) #33 Bryan Herta Autosport with PR1/Mathiasen	2026 Michelin Pilot Challenge
Michelin Pilot Challenge	TCR Manufacturers: (South Korea) Hyundai	2026 Michelin Pilot Challenge
Mustang Cup Australia	(Australia) Josh Anderson	2026 Mustang Cup Australia
Nürburgring Langstrecken-Serie	(Italy) Edoardo Bugane (Germany) Yannick Fübrich (Germany) Sven Markert	2026 Nürburgring Langstrecken-Serie
Nürburgring Langstrecken-Serie	Teams: (Germany) #77 Schubert Motorsport	2026 Nürburgring Langstrecken-Serie
Nürburgring Langstrecken-Serie	SP9 Pro: (Germany) Frank Stippler	2026 Nürburgring Langstrecken-Serie
Nürburgring Langstrecken-Serie	SP9 Pro-Am: (Germany) Patrick Assenheimer; SP9 Pro-Am: (Germany) Tobias Müller; SP9 Pro-Am: (Luxembourg) Dylan Pereira	2026 Nürburgring Langstrecken-Serie
Nürburgring Langstrecken-Serie	SP9 Am: (Turkey) Mustafa Mehmet Kaya; SP9 Am: (Germany) Mike Stursberg	2026 Nürburgring Langstrecken-Serie
Nürburgring Langstrecken-Serie	SP10: (Romania) Alexandru Vasilescu	2026 Nürburgring Langstrecken-Serie
Nürburgring Langstrecken-Serie	TCR: (Norway) Håkon Schjærin	2026 Nürburgring Langstrecken-Serie
Nürburgring Langstrecken-Serie	Cup2: (Germany) Alexander Hardt; Cup2: (Chile) Benjamín Hites; Cup2: (Germany) Benjamin Koslowski	2026 Nürburgring Langstrecken-Serie
Nürburgring Langstrecken-Serie	Cup3: (Germany) Alexander Fielenbach; Cup3: (Norway) Oskar Sandberg	2026 Nürburgring Langstrecken-Serie
Prototype Cup Europe	(Belgium) Maxim Dirickx	2026 Prototype Cup Europe
Prototype Cup Europe	Teams: (Germany) Aust Motorsport	2026 Prototype Cup Europe
Prototype Cup Europe	Trophy: (Sweden) Emil Hellberg	2026 Prototype Cup Europe
Prototype Cup Europe	Junior: (Belgium) Maxim Dirickx	2026 Prototype Cup Europe
Prototype Winter Series	(Denmark) Tobias Bille Clausen (Denmark) Mads Kjelde Larsen	2026 Prototype Winter Series
Prototype Winter Series	Teams: (Germany) Mücke Motorsport	2026 Prototype Winter Series
Radical Cup UK	(United Kingdom) Gordie Mutch	2026 Radical Cup UK
Radical Cup UK	Fangio: (United Kingdom) Andy Lowe	2026 Radical Cup UK
SRO Japan Cup	GT3: (Japan) Shintaro Kawabata; GT3: (Japan) Akihiro Tsuzuki	2026 SRO Japan Cup
SRO Japan Cup	GT3 Teams: (Japan) Hitotsuyama with Cornes Racing	2026 SRO Japan Cup
SRO Japan Cup	GT4: (Japan) Yoshimoto Makino; GT4: (Japan) Takeshi Suehiro	2026 SRO Japan Cup
SRO Japan Cup	GT4 Teams: (Japan) Zenko RS Garage with Sunrise BLVD	2026 SRO Japan Cup
SRO Japan Cup	GT3 Pro-Am: (Japan) Shintaro Kawabata; GT3 Pro-Am: (Japan) Akihiro Tsuzuki	2026 SRO Japan Cup
SRO Japan Cup	GT4 Pro-Am: (Japan) Yoshimoto Makino; GT4 Pro-Am: (Japan) Takeshi Suehiro	2026 SRO Japan Cup
SRO Japan Cup	GT3 Am: (Japan) Hiroshi Hamaguchi; GT3 Am: (Japan) Mineki Okura	2026 SRO Japan Cup
SRO Japan Cup	GT4 Am: (Hong Kong) Kelvin Ho Chun Ki; GT4 Am: (Japan) Maaya Orido	2026 SRO Japan Cup
Super GT	GT500: (Japan) Naoki Yamamoto; GT500: (Japan) Tadasuke Makino	2026 Super GT Series
Super GT	GT500 Teams: (Japan) No. 100 Stanley Team Kunimitsu	2026 Super GT Series
Super GT	GT300: (Brazil) João Paulo de Oliveira; GT300: (Japan) Iori Kimura	2026 Super GT Series
Super GT	GT300 Teams: (Japan) No. 56 Kondo Racing	2026 Super GT Series
Super Taikyu Series	ST-X: (Japan) No. 23 TKRI	2026 Super Taikyu Series
Super Taikyu Series	ST-Z: (Japan) No. 25 Team ZeroOne	2026 Super Taikyu Series
Super Taikyu Series	ST-TCR: (Japan) No. 19 Birth Racing Project【BRP】	2026 Super Taikyu Series
Super Taikyu Series	ST-USA: (Japan) No. 250 Birth Racing Project【BRP】	2026 Super Taikyu Series
Super Taikyu Series	ST-1: (Japan) No. 47 D'station Racing	2026 Super Taikyu Series
Super Taikyu Series	ST-2: (Japan) No. 13 Endless Sports	2026 Super Taikyu Series
Super Taikyu Series	ST-3: (Japan) No. 39 Tracy Sports with RCIT	2026 Super Taikyu Series
Super Taikyu Series	ST-4: (Japan) No. 41 Tracy Sports	2026 Super Taikyu Series
Super Taikyu Series	ST-5F: (Japan) No. 4 Team Bride	2026 Super Taikyu Series
Super Taikyu Series	ST-5R: (Japan) No. 88 Murakami Motors	2026 Super Taikyu Series
Supercar Challenge	GT: (Netherlands) Marlon Birdsall	2026 Supercar Challenge
Supercar Challenge	Supersport Plus: (Netherlands) Berry van Elk	2026 Supercar Challenge
Supercar Challenge	Supersport: (Netherlands) Tom Drummen; Supersport: (Netherlands) Emile Drummen	2026 Supercar Challenge
Supercar Challenge	Sport: (Belgium) Chris Voet	2026 Supercar Challenge
TA2 NZ Championship	(New Zealand) Caleb Byers	2025–26 TA2 NZ Championship
TA2 Racing Muscle Car Series	(Australia) Ben Gomersall	2026 TA2 Racing Muscle Car Series
Toyota Gazoo Racing GR86/BRZ Cup	(Japan) Yuui Tsutsumi	2026 Toyota Gazoo Racing GR86/BRZ Cup
Toyota GR Cup North America	(United States) Spike Kohlbecker	2026 Toyota GR Cup North America
Toyota GR Cup North America	Teams: (United States) TechSport Racing	2026 Toyota GR Cup North America
Toyota GR Cup North America	Legends: (United States) Patrick Brunson	2026 Toyota GR Cup North America
Trans-Am Series	TA: (United States) Matthew Brabham	2026 Trans-Am Series
Trans-Am Series	TA2: (United States) Helio Meza	2026 Trans-Am Series
Trans-Am Series	TA2 Pro-Am: (United States) Jared Odrick	2026 Trans-Am Series
Trans-Am Series	TA Sprint: (United States) John Atwell	2026 Trans-Am Series
Trans-Am Series	TA Cup: (United States) Cole Moore	2026 Trans-Am Series
Trans-Am Series	GT1: (United States) Brent Goforth	2026 Trans-Am Series
Trans-Am Series	XGT: (United States) Billy Griffin	2026 Trans-Am Series
Trans-Am Series	SGT: (United States) Chris Coffey	2026 Trans-Am Series
Trans-Am Series	GT: (United States) Derric Carter	2026 Trans-Am Series
Trans-Am Western Championship	TA2: (United States) Graham Jacobson	2026 Trans-Am Series
Trans-Am Western Championship	TA Cup: (United States) John Moore	2026 Trans-Am Series
Trans-Am Western Championship	SGT: (United States) Patrick Utt	2026 Trans-Am Series
Ferrari Challenge
Ferrari Challenge Australasia	Trofeo Pirelli: (Australia) Enzo Cheng	2026 Ferrari Challenge Australasia
Ferrari Challenge Australasia	Coppa Shell: (Australia) David Trewern	2026 Ferrari Challenge Australasia
Ferrari Challenge Australasia	Trofeo Pirelli 488: (Australia) Ross Tomain	2026 Ferrari Challenge Australasia
Ferrari Challenge Japan	Trofeo Pirelli: (Japan) "Yamatatsu"	2026 Ferrari Challenge Japan
Ferrari Challenge Japan	Trofeo Pirelli Am: (Japan) "Kenbow"	2026 Ferrari Challenge Japan
Ferrari Challenge Japan	Copa Shell: (Malaysia) Yi Hang Tan	2026 Ferrari Challenge Japan
Ferrari Challenge Japan	Copa Shell Am: (Japan) "J"	2026 Ferrari Challenge Japan
Ferrari Challenge UK	Trofeo Pirelli: (United Kingdom) Gilbert Yates	2026 Ferrari Challenge UK
Ferrari Challenge UK	Coppa Shell: (United Kingdom) Christopher Beighton	2026 Ferrari Challenge UK
Ferrari Challenge UK	Dealer: (United Kingdom) Charles Hurst	2026 Ferrari Challenge UK
Lamborghini Super Trofeo
Lamborghini Super Trofeo Asia	Pro: (United Kingdom) Will Tregurtha	2026 Lamborghini Super Trofeo Asia
Lamborghini Super Trofeo Asia	Pro-Am: (Australia) Todd Kingsford; Pro-Am: (New Zealand) Chris van der Drift	2026 Lamborghini Super Trofeo Asia
Lamborghini Super Trofeo Asia	Am: (Thailand) Suttiluck Buncharoen	2026 Lamborghini Super Trofeo Asia
Lamborghini Super Trofeo Asia	Lamborghini Cup: (Thailand) Supachai Weeraborwornpong	2026 Lamborghini Super Trofeo Asia
Lamborghini Super Trofeo Europe	Pro: (Italy) Simone Iaquinta; Pro: (Switzerland) Kevin Gilardoni	2026 Lamborghini Super Trofeo Europe
Lamborghini Super Trofeo Europe	Pro-Am: (Czech Republic) Bronislav Formánek; Pro-Am: (South Africa) Anthony Pretorius	2026 Lamborghini Super Trofeo Europe
Lamborghini Super Trofeo Europe	Am: (Czech Republic) Jakub Knoll; Am: (Belgium) Renaud Kuppens	2026 Lamborghini Super Trofeo Europe
Lamborghini Super Trofeo Europe	Lamborghini Cup: (Denmark) Peder Møller Demant; Lamborghini Cup: (Denmark) Nina Østergaard	2026 Lamborghini Super Trofeo Europe
Lamborghini Super Trofeo North America	Pro: (United States) Elias De La Torre IV	2026 Lamborghini Super Trofeo North America
Lamborghini Super Trofeo North America	Pro-Am: (United States) Graham Doyle; Pro-Am: (Costa Rica) Danny Formal	2026 Lamborghini Super Trofeo North America
Lamborghini Super Trofeo North America	Am: (United States) David Staab	2026 Lamborghini Super Trofeo North America
Lamborghini Super Trofeo North America	Lamborghini Cup: (Canada) Philippe Touchette	2026 Lamborghini Super Trofeo North America
Porsche Supercup, Porsche Carrera Cup
Porsche Supercup	(Netherlands) Flynt Schuring	2026 Porsche Supercup
Porsche Supercup	Teams: (France) Schumacher CLRT	2026 Porsche Supercup
Porsche Supercup	Rookies: (Luxembourg) Chester Kieffer	2026 Porsche Supercup
Porsche Carrera Cup Asia	(New Zealand) Marco Giltrap	2026 Porsche Carrera Cup Asia
Porsche Carrera Cup Asia	Pro-Am: (China) Wang Zhongwei	2026 Porsche Carrera Cup Asia
Porsche Carrera Cup Asia	Am: (Singapore) Roy Tang	2026 Porsche Carrera Cup Asia
Porsche Carrera Cup Asia	Masters: (Luxembourg) John Shen	2026 Porsche Carrera Cup Asia
Porsche Carrera Cup Asia	Dealer Trophy: (China) BWT Shanghai Yongda	2026 Porsche Carrera Cup Asia
Porsche Carrera Cup Australia	(Australia) Harri Jones	2026 Porsche Carrera Cup Australia
Porsche Carrera Cup Australia	Teams: TBD	2026 Porsche Carrera Cup Australia
Porsche Carrera Cup Australia	Pro-Am: TBD	2026 Porsche Carrera Cup Australia
Porsche Carrera Cup Australia	Junior: TBD	2026 Porsche Carrera Cup Australia
Porsche Carrera Cup Australia	Endurance Cup Pro: TBD	2026 Porsche Carrera Cup Australia
Porsche Carrera Cup Australia	Endurance Cup Pro-Am: TBD	2026 Porsche Carrera Cup Australia
Porsche Carrera Cup Benelux	(Poland) Milan Marczak	2026 Porsche Carrera Cup Benelux
Porsche Carrera Cup Benelux	Teams: (Estonia) Quanloop EST1 Racing	2026 Porsche Carrera Cup Benelux
Porsche Carrera Cup Benelux	Pro-Am: (Finland) Jani Käkelä	2026 Porsche Carrera Cup Benelux
Porsche Carrera Cup Benelux	Rookies: (Netherlands) Joep Muller	2026 Porsche Carrera Cup Benelux
Porsche Carrera Cup France	(France) Marvin Klein	2026 Porsche Carrera Cup France
Porsche Carrera Cup France	Teams: (France) Martinet by Alméras	2026 Porsche Carrera Cup France
Porsche Carrera Cup France	Pro-Am: (France) Karl Vandewoestyne	2026 Porsche Carrera Cup France
Porsche Carrera Cup France	Am: (France) Henry Hassid	2026 Porsche Carrera Cup France
Porsche Carrera Cup France	Rookies: (France) Macéo Capietto	2026 Porsche Carrera Cup France
Porsche Carrera Cup Germany	(South Africa) Keagan Masters	2026 Porsche Carrera Cup Germany
Porsche Carrera Cup Germany	Teams: (Germany) Proton Competition	2026 Porsche Carrera Cup Germany
Porsche Carrera Cup Germany	Pro-Am: (Germany) Michael Essmann	2026 Porsche Carrera Cup Germany
Porsche Carrera Cup Germany	Rookies: (Luxembourg) Chester Kieffer	2026 Porsche Carrera Cup Germany
Porsche Carrera Cup Great Britain	(United Kingdom) Callum Voisin	2026 Porsche Carrera Cup Great Britain
Porsche Carrera Cup Great Britain	Teams: (United Kingdom) Rosland Gold by Century Motorsport	2026 Porsche Carrera Cup Great Britain
Porsche Carrera Cup Great Britain	Pro-Am: (United Kingdom) Stephen Jelley	2026 Porsche Carrera Cup Great Britain
Porsche Carrera Cup Great Britain	Masters: (United Kingdom) Carl Cavers	2026 Porsche Carrera Cup Great Britain
Porsche Carrera Cup Great Britain	Talent Pool: (United Kingdom) Isaac Phelps	2026 Porsche Carrera Cup Great Britain
Porsche Carrera Cup Italia	(Italy) Andrea Bristot	2026 Porsche Carrera Cup Italia
Porsche Carrera Cup Italia	Teams: (Italy) Target Competition	2026 Porsche Carrera Cup Italia
Porsche Carrera Cup Italia	Rookies: (Italy) Andrea Bristot	2026 Porsche Carrera Cup Italia
Porsche Carrera Cup Italia	Michelin Cup: (Italy) Stefano Stefanelli	2026 Porsche Carrera Cup Italia
Porsche Carrera Cup Japan	(Japan) Taichi Watarai	2026 Porsche Carrera Cup Japan
Porsche Carrera Cup Japan	Teams: (Japan) Seven x Seven Racing	2026 Porsche Carrera Cup Japan
Porsche Carrera Cup Japan	Pro-Am: (Japan) "Hiro"	2026 Porsche Carrera Cup Japan
Porsche Carrera Cup Japan	Am: (Japan) "Ikeda"	2026 Porsche Carrera Cup Japan
Porsche Carrera Cup Japan	Dealer: (Japan) Showa Auto with Bingo Racing	2026 Porsche Carrera Cup Japan
Porsche Carrera Cup Middle East	(Japan) Taichi Watarai	2025–26 Porsche Carrera Cup Middle East
Porsche Carrera Cup Middle East	Teams: (Japan) Seven x Seven Racing	2025–26 Porsche Carrera Cup Middle East
Porsche Carrera Cup Middle East	Pro-Am: (France) Cedric Chassang	2025–26 Porsche Carrera Cup Middle East
Porsche Carrera Cup Middle East	Masters: (Sweden) Krister Andero	2025–26 Porsche Carrera Cup Middle East
Porsche Carrera Cup Middle East	Rookies: (Japan) Taichi Watarai	2025–26 Porsche Carrera Cup Middle East
Porsche Carrera Cup Middle East	GCC: (Saudi Arabia) Khaled Alahmadi	2025–26 Porsche Carrera Cup Middle East
Porsche Carrera Cup North America	(United States) Tyler Maxson	2026 Porsche Carrera Cup North America
Porsche Carrera Cup North America	Teams: (United States) Topp Racing	2026 Porsche Carrera Cup North America
Porsche Carrera Cup North America	Pro-Am: (United States) Patrick Mulcahy	2026 Porsche Carrera Cup North America
Porsche Carrera Cup North America	Masters: (Canada) Marco Cirone	2026 Porsche Carrera Cup North America
Porsche Carrera Cup North America	Rookies: (United States) Cole Kleck	2026 Porsche Carrera Cup North America
Porsche Carrera Cup Scandinavia	(Sweden) William Siverholm	2026 Porsche Carrera Cup Scandinavia
Porsche Carrera Cup Scandinavia	Teams: (Sweden) Fragus Motorsport	2026 Porsche Carrera Cup Scandinavia
Porsche Carrera Cup Scandinavia	Pro-Am: (Sweden) Albin Wärnelöv	2026 Porsche Carrera Cup Scandinavia
Porsche Sprint Challenge
Porsche Sprint Challenge Australia	(Australia) Lincoln Taylor	2026 Porsche Sprint Challenge Australia
Porsche Sprint Challenge Australia	Pro-Am: (Australia) Anthony Gilbertson	2026 Porsche Sprint Challenge Australia
Porsche Sprint Challenge Benelux	(France) Pierre Clay	2026 Porsche Sprint Challenge Benelux
Porsche Sprint Challenge Benelux	GT3 Cup: (France) Pierre Clay	2026 Porsche Sprint Challenge Benelux
Porsche Sprint Challenge Benelux	Cayman Cup: (United Kingdom) Philipp Thomas	2026 Porsche Sprint Challenge Benelux
Porsche Sprint Challenge Central Europe	Sprint: (Estonia) Markus Kajak	2026 Porsche Sprint Challenge Central Europe
Porsche Sprint Challenge Central Europe	Sprint Pro-Am: (Lithuania) Mantas Janavicius	2026 Porsche Sprint Challenge Central Europe
Porsche Sprint Challenge Central Europe	Sprint Am: (Lithuania) Tautvydas Rudokas	2026 Porsche Sprint Challenge Central Europe
Porsche Sprint Challenge Central Europe	Sprint Masters: (Lithuania) Audrius Piktys	2026 Porsche Sprint Challenge Central Europe
Porsche Sprint Challenge Central Europe	Endurance: (Estonia) Markus Kajak	2026 Porsche Sprint Challenge Central Europe
Porsche Sprint Challenge Central Europe	Endurance Pro-Am: (Lithuania) Mantas Janavicius	2026 Porsche Sprint Challenge Central Europe
Porsche Sprint Challenge Central Europe	Endurance Am: (Lithuania) Tautvydas Rudokas; Endurance Am: (Lithuania) Audrius Piktys	2026 Porsche Sprint Challenge Central Europe
Porsche Sprint Challenge Central Europe	Endurance Masters: (Austria) Günter Benninger	2026 Porsche Sprint Challenge Central Europe
Porsche Sprint Challenge Central Europe	Rookies: (Estonia) Markus Kajak	2026 Porsche Sprint Challenge Central Europe
Porsche Sprint Challenge Central Europe	Teams: (Lithuania) Dream 2 Drive	2026 Porsche Sprint Challenge Central Europe
Porsche Sprint Challenge France	Cup: (France) Victor Blugeon	2026 Porsche Sprint Challenge France
Porsche Sprint Challenge France	Endurance: (France) Fabian Bouché	2026 Porsche Sprint Challenge France
Porsche Sprint Challenge Great Britain	RS Pro: (United Kingdom) Joe Marshall	2026 Porsche Sprint Challenge Great Britain
Porsche Sprint Challenge Great Britain	RS Teams: (United Kingdom) Team Parker Racing	2026 Porsche Sprint Challenge Great Britain
Porsche Sprint Challenge Great Britain	RS Am: (United Kingdom) Daniel Lewis	2026 Porsche Sprint Challenge Great Britain
Porsche Sprint Challenge Great Britain	Clubsport: (United Kingdom) Gabe Fairbrother	2026 Porsche Sprint Challenge Great Britain
Porsche Sprint Challenge Great Britain	Clubsport Teams: (United Kingdom) Graves Motorsport	2026 Porsche Sprint Challenge Great Britain
Porsche Sprint Challenge Iberica	(Spain) Borja García (Spain) Alejandro Barambio	2026 Porsche Sprint Challenge Iberica
Porsche Sprint Challenge Iberica	Teams: (Spain) GT Corse	2026 Porsche Sprint Challenge Iberica
Porsche Sprint Challenge Iberica	Silver: (Spain) Borja García; Silver: (Spain) Alejandro Barambio	2026 Porsche Sprint Challenge Iberica
Porsche Sprint Challenge Iberica	Bronze: (Portugal) Patrick Cunha	2026 Porsche Sprint Challenge Iberica
Porsche Sprint Challenge Iberica	Ladies Cup: (Portugal) Kika Queiróz	2026 Porsche Sprint Challenge Iberica
Porsche Sprint Challenge North America	GT3 Cup: (Belgium) Karel Staut	2026 Porsche Sprint Challenge North America
Porsche Sprint Challenge North America	GT3 Cup Teams: (United States) Kellymoss	2026 Porsche Sprint Challenge North America
Porsche Sprint Challenge North America	GT3 Cup Pro-Am: (Belgium) Karel Staut	2026 Porsche Sprint Challenge North America
Porsche Sprint Challenge North America	GT3 Cup Masters: (United States) Mark Boden	2026 Porsche Sprint Challenge North America
Porsche Sprint Challenge North America	Cayman: (United States) Anna Cecchi	2026 Porsche Sprint Challenge North America
Porsche Sprint Challenge North America	Cayman Teams: (United States) CHR	2026 Porsche Sprint Challenge North America
Porsche Sprint Challenge North America	Cayman Pro-Am: (United States) Anna Cecchi	2026 Porsche Sprint Challenge North America
Porsche Sprint Challenge North America	Cayman Masters: (United States) William Peluchiwski	2026 Porsche Sprint Challenge North America
Porsche Sprint Challenge Southern Europe	Sport: (Poland) Milan Marczak	2026 Porsche Sprint Challenge Southern Europe
Porsche Sprint Challenge Southern Europe	Club: (Dominican Republic) Joel Monegro	2026 Porsche Sprint Challenge Southern Europe
Porsche Sprint Challenge Southern Europe	GT4: (United Kingdom) Daniel Lewis	2026 Porsche Sprint Challenge Southern Europe
Porsche Sprint Challenge Southern Europe	Rookies: (Netherlands) Jesse Polderdijk	2026 Porsche Sprint Challenge Southern Europe
Porsche Sprint Challenge Suisse	GT3 Cup: (Austria) Felix Neuhofer	2026 Porsche Sprint Challenge Suisse
Porsche Sprint Challenge Suisse	GT4 Clubsport: (Switzerland) David Dias	2026 Porsche Sprint Challenge Suisse
Porsche Sprint Challenge Suisse	GT Open: (Germany) Levin Gelf	2026 Porsche Sprint Challenge Suisse

== Stock car racing ==
Series	Champion	Refer
NASCAR Cup Series	(United States) Kyle Larson	2026 NASCAR Cup Series
NASCAR Cup Series	Manufacturers: (Japan) Toyota	2026 NASCAR Cup Series
NASCAR O'Reilly Auto Parts Series	(United States) Justin Allgaier	2026 NASCAR O'Reilly Auto Parts Series
NASCAR O'Reilly Auto Parts Series	Manufacturers: (United States) Chevrolet	2026 NASCAR O'Reilly Auto Parts Series
NASCAR Craftsman Truck Series	(United States) Kaden Honeycutt	2026 NASCAR Craftsman Truck Series
NASCAR Craftsman Truck Series	Manufacturers: (United States) Ford	2026 NASCAR Craftsman Truck Series
NASCAR Canada Series	(Canada) Marc-Antoine Camirand	2026 NASCAR Canada Series
NASCAR Canada Series	Manufacturers: (United States) Chevrolet	2026 NASCAR Canada Series
NASCAR Euro Series	(Italy) Vittorio Ghirelli	2026 NASCAR Euro Series
NASCAR Euro Series	Teams: (Belgium) PK Carsport	2026 NASCAR Euro Series
NASCAR Euro Series	Open: (Switzerland) Thomas Toffel	2026 NASCAR Euro Series
NASCAR Euro Series	Rookies: (France) Yann Cristovao	2026 NASCAR Euro Series
NASCAR Mexico Series	(Mexico) Rubén García Jr.	2026 NASCAR Mexico Series
NASCAR Mexico Series	Manufacturers: (United States) Chevrolet	2026 NASCAR Mexico Series
NASCAR Mexico Series	Challenge: (Mexico) Gerardo Rodriguez	2026 NASCAR Mexico Series
NASCAR Whelen Modified Tour	(United States) Patrick Emerling	2026 NASCAR Whelen Modified Tour
ARCA Menards Series	(United States) Thomas Annunziata	2026 ARCA Menards Series
ARCA Menards Series East	(United States) Tristan McKee	2026 ARCA Menards Series East
ARCA Menards Series West	(United States) Trevor Huddleston	2026 ARCA Menards Series West
ASA STARS National Tour	(United States) Carson Brown	2026 ASA STARS National Tour
CARS Tour	Late Model: (United States) Caden Kvapil	2026 CARS Tour
CARS Tour	Pro Late Model: (United States) Mason Walters	2026 CARS Tour
SMART Modified Tour	(United States) Jake Crum	2026 SMART Modified Tour

== Touring car racing ==
Series	Champion	Refer
BMW M2 Cup	(Germany) Michael Schrey	2026 BMW M2 Cup
BMW M2 Cup	Teams: (Germany) Hofor Racing by Bonk Motorsport	2026 BMW M2 Cup
British Touring Car Championship	(United Kingdom) Ashley Sutton	2026 British Touring Car Championship
British Touring Car Championship	Teams: (United Kingdom) NAPA Racing UK	2026 British Touring Car Championship
British Touring Car Championship	Manufacturers' / Constructors': (United States) Ford / (United Kingdom) Alliance Racing	2026 British Touring Car Championship
British Touring Car Championship	Independent: (United Kingdom) Mikey Doble	2026 British Touring Car Championship
British Touring Car Championship	Independent Teams: (United Kingdom) Power Maxed Racing	2026 British Touring Car Championship
British Touring Car Championship	Jack Sears Trophy: (United Kingdom) Dexter Patterson	2026 British Touring Car Championship
Mini Challenge UK	(United Kingdom) Tom Ovenden	2026 Mini Challenge UK
Mini Challenge UK	Teams: (United Kingdom) EXCELR8 Driver Development Programme	2026 Mini Challenge UK
Mini Challenge UK	JCW Sport: (United Kingdom) Alfie Garford	2026 Mini Challenge UK
Mini Challenge UK	JCW Sport Teams: (United Kingdom) Wera Alliance Racing Academy	2026 Mini Challenge UK
Mini Challenge UK	Trophy: (United Kingdom) Alex Keens	2026 Mini Challenge UK
Mini Challenge UK	Trophy Teams: (United Kingdom) Graves Motorsport	2026 Mini Challenge UK
Supercars Championship	TBD	2026 Supercars Championship
Supercars Championship	Teams: TBD	2026 Supercars Championship
Supercars Championship	Manufacturers: (United States) Ford	2026 Supercars Championship
Supercars Championship	Sprint Cup: (Australia) Broc Feeney	2026 Supercars Championship
Supercars Championship	Enduro Cup: (Australia) Will Brown; Enduro Cup: (Australia) Scott Pye	2026 Supercars Championship
South African Touring Cars	(South Africa) Julian van der Watt	2026 South African Touring Cars
South African Touring Cars	Manufacturers: (Germany) Volkswagen	2026 South African Touring Cars
South African Touring Cars	SupaCup: (South Africa) Jason Loosemore	2026 South African Touring Cars
TC America Series	(Canada) Braydon Arthur	2026 TC America Series
TC America Series	Teams: (Canada) JMF Motorsports	2026 TC America Series
TC America Series	Manufacturers: (Japan) Toyota Gazoo Racing	2026 TC America Series
TC America Series	Hyundai Cup: (United States) Andre Castro	2026 TC America Series
TC France Series	TCR: (France) Pierre Bredeaux	2026 TC France Series
TC France Series	TCR Teams: (France) JSB Compétition	2026 TC France Series
TC France Series	GT Light: (France) Stéphane Codet	2026 TC France Series
TC France Series	GT Light Teams: (France) Team CDRS	2026 TC France Series
TC France Series	TC: (France) Kévin Ropars	2026 TC France Series
TC France Series	TC Teams: (France) 2RT	2026 TC France Series
TC France Series	TCA: (France) Bastien Girard	2026 TC France Series
TC France Series	TCA Teams: (France) Team Leal Compétition	2026 TC France Series
TC France Series	TCA Light: (France) Marvin Barinsky	2026 TC France Series
TC France Series	TCA Light Teams: (France) Team Clairet Sport	2026 TC France Series
TC France Series	TC Cup: (France) Mickaël Boisdur	2026 TC France Series
TC France Series	TC Cup Teams: (France) ADWShop Motorsport	2026 TC France Series
Touring Car Masters	(Australia) Steven Johnson	2026 Touring Car Masters
TCR Touring Car
TCR World Tour	(Spain) Mikel Azcona	2026 TCR World Tour
TCR World Tour	Teams: (China) Geely Cyan Racing	2026 TCR World Tour
TCR Brasil Touring Car Championship	(Argentina) Leonel Pernía	2026 TCR Brasil Touring Car Championship
TCR Brasil Touring Car Championship	Teams: (Argentina) Honda Racing	2026 TCR Brasil Touring Car Championship
TCR Brasil Touring Car Championship	Trophy Cup: (Argentina) Adrián Chiriano	2026 TCR Brasil Touring Car Championship
TCR China Touring Car Championship	(China) David Zhu	2026 TCR China Touring Car Championship
TCR China Touring Car Championship	Teams: (China) Lynk & Co Teamwork	2026 TCR China Touring Car Championship
TCR China Touring Car Championship	Rookies: (Hong Kong) Frederick Lee Fu Kwan	2026 TCR China Touring Car Championship
TCR Eastern Europe Touring Car Series	(Czech Republic) Martin Kadlečík	2026 TCR Eastern Europe Touring Car Series
TCR Eastern Europe Touring Car Series	Teams: (Czech Republic) Hyundai / Janík Motorsport	2026 TCR Eastern Europe Touring Car Series
TCR Europe Touring Car Series	(Italy) Marco Butti	2026 TCR Europe Touring Car Series
TCR Europe Touring Car Series	Teams: (Estonia) ALM Motorsport	2026 TCR Europe Touring Car Series
TCR Europe Touring Car Series	Youth: (Canada) Nicolas Taylor	2026 TCR Europe Touring Car Series
TCR Europe Touring Car Series	Diamond: (Hong Kong) Victor Chan	2026 TCR Europe Touring Car Series
TCR European Endurance Touring Car Series	(Italy) Alessandro Lisi (Italy) Alessandro Berton	2026 TCR European Endurance Touring Car Series
TCR European Endurance Touring Car Series	Gen1: (Turkey) Berk Kalpaklıoğlu	2026 TCR European Endurance Touring Car Series
TCR European Endurance Touring Car Series	Gen1 Teams: (Turkey) Texaco Team AMS	2026 TCR European Endurance Touring Car Series
TCR European Endurance Touring Car Series	Gen2: (Italy) Alessandro Lisi; Gen2: (Italy) Alessandro Berton	2026 TCR European Endurance Touring Car Series
TCR European Endurance Touring Car Series	Gen2 Teams: (Italy) BF Motorsport	2026 TCR European Endurance Touring Car Series
TCR European Endurance Touring Car Series	DSG: (Italy) Paolo Palanti; DSG: (Italy) Cristian Carinci	2026 TCR European Endurance Touring Car Series
TCR European Endurance Touring Car Series	DSG Teams: (Italy) Casals Motorsport	2026 TCR European Endurance Touring Car Series
TCR Italy Touring Car Championship	(Italy) Michele Imberti	2026 TCR Italy Touring Car Championship
TCR Italy Touring Car Championship	Teams: (Italy) Kombat Motorsport	2026 TCR Italy Touring Car Championship
TCR Italy Touring Car Championship	Masters: (Italy) Sandro Pelatti	2026 TCR Italy Touring Car Championship
TCR Italy Touring Car Championship	Under 25: (Italy) Carlo Alberto Bocca	2026 TCR Italy Touring Car Championship
TCR Italy Touring Car Championship	DSG: (Italy) Francesco Miotto	2026 TCR Italy Touring Car Championship
TCR Italy Touring Car Championship	DSG Teams: (Italy) Planet Motorsport	2026 TCR Italy Touring Car Championship
TCR Italy Touring Car Championship	DSG Masters: (Italy) Daniele Verrocchio	2026 TCR Italy Touring Car Championship
TCR Panama Touring Car Championship	(Panama) Luis Ramírez	2026 TCR Panama Touring Car Championship
TCR Panama Touring Car Championship	Teams: TBD	2026 TCR Panama Touring Car Championship
TCR Spain Touring Car Championship	(Sweden) Viktor Andersson	2026 TCR Spain Touring Car Championship
TCR Spain Touring Car Championship	Teams: (Estonia) ALM Motorsport	2026 TCR Spain Touring Car Championship
TCR Spain Touring Car Championship	Cup: (Spain) Álvaro Rodríguez Sastre	2026 TCR Spain Touring Car Championship
TCR Spain Touring Car Championship	Masters: (Denmark) René Povlsen	2026 TCR Spain Touring Car Championship
TCR UK Touring Car Championship	(United Kingdom) Callum Newsham	2026 TCR UK Touring Car Championship
TCR UK Touring Car Championship	Teams: (United Kingdom) Hall's Racing	2026 TCR UK Touring Car Championship
TCR UK Touring Car Championship	Diamond Trophy: (Republic of Ireland) Rod McGovern	2026 TCR UK Touring Car Championship
TCR UK Touring Car Championship	Tom Walker Trophy: (United Kingdom) Harry Bloor	2026 TCR UK Touring Car Championship

== Truck racing ==
Series	Champion	Refer
British Truck Racing Championship	(United Kingdom) David Jenkins	2026 British Truck Racing Championship
British Truck Racing Championship	Div 2: (United Kingdom) Callum Eason	2026 British Truck Racing Championship
European Truck Racing Championship	(Hungary) Norbert Kiss	2026 European Truck Racing Championship
European Truck Racing Championship	Teams: (Hungary) Révész Racing	2026 European Truck Racing Championship
European Truck Racing Championship	Junior: (Portugal) José Eduardo Rodrigues	2026 European Truck Racing Championship
European Truck Racing Championship	CHROME: (United Kingdom) John Newell	2026 European Truck Racing Championship
