= 2026 Australian Formula Ford Championship =

Motor racing competition

The 2026 Australian Formula Ford Championship (known for commercial reasons as the 2026 Yokohama Tyres AASA Australian Formula Ford Championship) was a motor racing championship for drivers of Formula Ford racing cars. It was the 57th national series for Formula Fords to be held in Australia. The championship commenced on March 13 at The Bend Motorsport Park and concluded at Phillip Island Grand Prix Circuit on October 4.

This season was initially the first to be run under AASA (Australian Auto-Sport Alliance) governance. However, amidst turmoil that lead to a mass exodus of racing categories from the alliance, the Formula Ford series would follow suit and break away following the fifth round at Queensland. This year also saw the revival of the Australian Formula Ford Championship name, with it last having been run in 2013.

The championship was won by Seth Burchartz, who won the title during the final round at the Phillip Island Grand Prix Circuit.

== Calendar ==
The following circuits hosted a round of the 2026 championship. Midway through the calendar year, turmoil amidst the AASA would lead to the original final two rounds being omitted from the schedule.

Rd	Circuit	Dates	Event	Maps
1	(Victoria (state)) The Bend Motorsport Park (West Circuit)	13–15 March	Hi-Tec Oils Super Series	2026 Australian Formula Ford Championship is located in Australia
2	(New South Wales) Sydney Motorsport Park (Druitt Circuit)	25–26 April	AASA Short Track Nationals	2026 Australian Formula Ford Championship is located in Australia
3	Queensland Raceway (National Circuit)	1–3 May	Hi-Tec Oils Super Series	2026 Australian Formula Ford Championship is located in Australia
4	(New South Wales) Sydney Motorsport Park (Gardner Circuit)	17–18 July	Hi-Tec Oils Super Series	2026 Australian Formula Ford Championship is located in Australia
5	Queensland Raceway (National Circuit)	14–16 August	AASA Race Series	2026 Australian Formula Ford Championship is located in Australia
6	(Victoria (state)) Winton Motor Raceway (National Circuit)	25–27 September	Hi-Tec Oils Super Series	2026 Australian Formula Ford Championship is located in Australia
7	(Victoria (state)) Phillip Island Grand Prix Circuit (Grand Prix Circuit)	2–4 October	Hi-Tec Oils Super Series	2026 Australian Formula Ford Championship is located in Australia

=== Cancelled rounds ===
On August 19, the Formula Ford Association administrator Phil Marrinon announced that the series would break away from the AASA to join the newly-formed Hi-Tech Oils Super Series after the Queensland round. As a result, the final two rounds at Mallala and Calder Park would be omitted from the schedule.

Circuit	Dates
(South Australia) Mallala Motorsport Park (Full Circuit)	23–24 October
(Victoria (state)) Calder Park Raceway (Original Circuit)	6–7 November

== Teams and drivers ==
Entrant	Chassis	No	Driver	Rounds
CoolDrive Auto Parts	Mygale SJ2012	3	(Australia) Jarrod Hurst	7
LR Racing	Spectrum 011	4	(Australia) Lochlan Shearsmith	5
Synergy Motorsport	Spectrum 015	5	(Australia) Giuseppe Imbrogno	1–5, 7
Synergy Motorsport		68	(New Zealand) Maxim Kirwan	5
Synergy Motorsport		79	(Australia) Braxton Regan	6
Holinger Racing	Spectrum 015	8	(Australia) Xavier Henderson	1–5, 7
Holinger Racing	Spectrum 014	14	(Australia) William Hickey	All
Holinger Racing	Spectrum 015	36	(Australia) Isaac Demellweek	All
Borland Racing Developments	Spectrum 011d	10	(Australia) Ryan DeBorre	1–6
Borland Racing Developments	Spectrum 015	15	(Australia) Samuel March	All
Borland Racing Developments	Spectrum 014	43	(Australia) Kaleb Balek	1–5, 7
Versa Motorsport	Spectrum 012b	16	(Australia) Hunter Salvatore	All
Petronas / Cooldrive		17	(Australia) Angus Baills	5
Sonic Motor Racing Services	Mygale SJ18A	24	(Australia) Seth Burchartz	All
BF Racing	Mygale SJ11A	34	(Australia) Oli Wickham	All
Marcos Ambrose Motorsport	Spectrum 015	46	(Australia) Tabitha Ambrose	All
Jamie Rowe Racing	Spectrum 015	48	(Australia) Jamie Rowe	1–4
William Lowing Motorsport	Mygale SJ10A	53	(Australia) William Lowing	1–6
Kobi Williams Racing	Spectrum 012	61	(Australia) Brad James	All
Kobi Williams Racing	Spectrum 012b	333	(Australia) Rio Campbell	All
KDL Property Group	Mygale SJ11A	77	(Australia) Jett Leicester	All
Mineeff Manufacturing Services	Mygale SJ09A	151	(Australia) Lachlan Mineeff	1–6

== Results and standings ==
=== Season summary ===
Rd	Race	Circuit	Pole position	Fastest lap	Winning driver	Winning team
1	1	(South Australia) The Bend Motorsport Park	(Australia) Jamie Rowe	(Australia) Kaleb Belak	(Australia) Jamie Rowe	Jamie Rowe Racing
1	2	(South Australia) The Bend Motorsport Park		(Australia) Hunter Salvatore	(Australia) Oli Wickham	BF Racing
1	3	(South Australia) The Bend Motorsport Park	(Australia) Oli Wickham	(Australia) Jamie Rowe	(Australia) Oli Wickham	BF Racing
1	4	(South Australia) The Bend Motorsport Park		(Australia) Isaac Demellweek	(Australia) Isaac Demellweek	Holinger Racing
2	1	(New South Wales) Sydney Motorsport Park	(Australia) Oli Wickham	(Australia) William Lowing	(Australia) Oli Wickham	BF Racing
2	2	(New South Wales) Sydney Motorsport Park		(Australia) Isaac Demellweek	(Australia) Seth Burchartz	Sonic Motor Racing Services
3	1	Queensland Raceway	(Australia) Oli Wickham	(Australia) Hunter Salvatore	(Australia) Oli Wickham	BF Racing
3	2	Queensland Raceway		(Australia) William Lowing	(Australia) Oli Wickham	BF Racing
3	3	Queensland Raceway	(Australia) Seth Burchartz	(Australia) Lachlan Mineeff	(Australia) Lachlan Mineeff	Mineeff Manufacturing Services
4	1	(New South Wales) Sydney Motorsport Park	(Australia) Oli Wickham	(Australia) Oli Wickham	(Australia) Isaac Demellweek	Holinger Racing
4	2	(New South Wales) Sydney Motorsport Park		(Australia) Hunter Salvatore	(Australia) Oli Wickham	BF Racing
4	3	(New South Wales) Sydney Motorsport Park	(Australia) William Lowing	(Australia) Isaac Demellweek	(Australia) William Lowing	William Lowing Motorsport
4	4	(New South Wales) Sydney Motorsport Park		(Australia) Oli Wickham	(Australia) Seth Burchartz	Sonic Motor Racing Services
5	1	Queensland Raceway	(Australia) Seth Burchartz	(Australia) Oli Wickham	(Australia) William Lowing	William Lowing Motorsport
5	2	Queensland Raceway		(Australia) Xavier Henderson	(Australia) William Lowing	William Lowing Motorsport
5	3	Queensland Raceway	(Australia) Seth Burchartz	(Australia) Oli Wickham	(Australia) Oli Wickham	BF Racing
5	4	Queensland Raceway		(Australia) Isaac Demellweek	(Australia) Seth Burchartz	Sonic Motor Racing Services
6	1	(Victoria (state)) Winton Motor Raceway	(Australia) Seth Burchartz	(Australia) Oli Wickham	(Australia) Seth Burchartz	Sonic Motor Racing Services
6	2	(Victoria (state)) Winton Motor Raceway		(Australia) Seth Burchartz	(Australia) Seth Burchartz	Sonic Motor Racing Services
6	3	(Victoria (state)) Winton Motor Raceway	(Australia) Seth Burchartz	(Australia) Seth Burchartz	(Australia) Seth Burchartz	Sonic Motor Racing Services
6	4	(Victoria (state)) Winton Motor Raceway		(Australia) Seth Burchartz	(Australia) Seth Burchartz	Sonic Motor Racing Services
7	1	(Victoria (state)) Phillip Island Grand Prix Circuit	Race cancelled due to inclement weather			
7	2	(Victoria (state)) Phillip Island Grand Prix Circuit	(Australia) Isaac Demellweek	(Australia) Seth Burchartz	(Australia) Oli Wickham	BF Racing
7	3	(Victoria (state)) Phillip Island Grand Prix Circuit		(Australia) Isaac Demellweek	(Australia) Isaac Demellweek	Holinger Racing

=== Championship standings ===
Pos.	Driver	(South Australia) BEN				(New South Wales) SYD1		(Queensland) QUE1			(New South Wales) SYD2				(Queensland) QUE2				(Victoria (state)) WIN				(Victoria (state)) PHI			Pts
Pos.	Driver	R1	R2	R3	R4	R1	R2	R1	R2	R3	R1	R2	R3	R4	R1	R2	R3	R4	R1	R2	R3	R4	R1	R2	R3	Pts
1	(Australia) Seth Burchartz	5	3	3	3	2	1	2	10	2	8	3	3	1	2	5	2	1	1	1	1	1	C	2	3	962
2	(Australia) Oli Wickham	2	1	1	4	1	9	1	1	12	2	1	7	6	10	Ret	1	2	2	2	2	2	C	1	2	915
3	(Australia) Isaac Demellweek	3	4	2	1	8	8	3	2	3	1	2	15	Ret	DNS	2	4	3	3	4	3	3	C	3	1	790
4	(Australia) Hunter Salvatore	4	Ret	8	Ret	4	7	5	5	4	3	9	4	7	12	3	Ret	11	7	6	5	Ret	C	5	6	447
5	(Australia) William Lowing	Ret	DNS	DNS	DNS	3	4	Ret	6	Ret	4	8	1	2	1	1	3	5	Ret	Ret	7	9				446
6	(Australia) Lachlan Mineeff	8	5	7	Ret	11	6	6	4	1	5	Ret	6	4	6	9	5	6	5	7	Ret	Ret				420
7	(Australia) Jamie Rowe	1	2	4	2	Ret	5	4	3	5	Ret	6	2	3												416
8	(Australia) Sam March	11	6	5	6	10	10	10	Ret	6	9	13	5	5	7	Ret	Ret	12	4	3	4	5	C	11	5	407
9	(Australia) Brad James	Ret	7	12	11	9	13	8	9	10	10	4	9	Ret	5	Ret	7	7	Ret	9	Ret	DNS	C	4	4	346
10	(Australia) Giuseppe Imbrogno	Ret	12	6	5	5	Ret	14	8	Ret	6	5	8	10	3	4	6	5					C	12	9	330
11	(Australia) Kaleb Balek	6	Ret	Ret	7	7	3	9	7	7	12	7	9	12	9	12	9	14					C	8	8	304
12	(Australia) Tabitha Ambrose	10	8	10	8	13	Ret	13	13	8	13	11	13	12	14	8	12	16	9	11	10	7	C	9	13	252
13	(Australia) Xavier Henderson	7	Ret	Ret	Ret	6	2	7	DNS	Ret	11	10	11	14	13	6	14	10					C	6	7	243
14	(Australia) William Hickey	Ret	9	11	Ret	12	11	11	11	9	7	Ret	16	11	11	Ret	11	Ret	8	10	8	6	C	7	10	239
15	(Australia) Rio Campbell	Ret	DNS	Ret	9	14	15	12	12	Ret	Ret	Ret	10	8	17	Ret	8	8	6	5	6	4	C	Ret	Ret	227
16	(Australia) Jett Leicester	9	11	9	Ret	15	12	Ret	DNS	Ret	14	Ret	14	13	4	7	10	9	10	WD	WD	WD	C	10	12	189
17	(Australia) Ryan DeBorre	12	10	13	10	16	14	15	14	11	15	12	17	15	15	11	13	13	11	DNS	11	Ret				129
18	(Australia) Braxton Regan																		12	8	9	8				58
19	(Australia) Lochlan Shearsmith														16	10	Ret	15								22
20	(Australia) Jarrod Hurst																						C	13	11	18
21	(New Zealand) Maxim Kirwan														8	Ret	DNS	DNS								14
22	(Australia) Angus Baills														WD	WD	WD	WD								0
Pos.	Driver	R1	R2	R3	R4	R1	R2	R1	R2	R3	R1	R2	R3	R4	R1	R2	R3	R4	R1	R2	R3	R4	R1	R2	R3	Pts
Pos.	Driver	(South Australia) BEN				(New South Wales) SYD1		(Queensland) QUE1			(New South Wales) SYD2				(Queensland) QUE2				(Victoria (state)) WIN				(Victoria (state)) PHI			Pts
