= 2026 National Superstock Championship =

Motorcycle racing season

The 2026 Pirelli National Superstock Championship was the 27th season of the National Superstock 1000 Championship, a superstock motorcycle racing series run as the primary support class to the 2026 British Superbike Championship. David Allingham won the riders' championship, sealing the title in the penultimate race at Brands Hatch ahead of runner-up Luke Mossey.

== Teams and Riders ==
2026 Entry List
Team	Constructor	No.	Rider	Rounds
MasterMac Honda	Honda	2	(England) Daniel Brooks	1-5, 7-8
C&L Fairburn Properties BMW	BMW	3	(Australia) Billy McConnell	5, 7-10
TAG Racing	Honda	4	(England) Matt Truelove	1-7, 9-10
TAG Racing	Honda	74	(Netherlands) Jaimie van Sikkelerus	3-10
Honda Racing UK	Honda	5	(England) John McGuinness	
Sam Osborne Racing	Suzuki	6	(England) Sam Osborne	
Sam Laffins / Vandenhoy Racing	Honda	7	(Northern Ireland) Sam Laffins	
Rapid Honda with Drivelife	Honda	8	(England) Ash Barnes	All
Rapid Honda with Drivelife	Honda	33	(Scotland) Declan Connell	1-6, 9-10
Rapid Honda with Drivelife	Honda	36	(England) Jamie Coward	
Team RST	BMW	9	(England) Ian Hutchinson	1, 8-9
Carl Cox BMW by MLav Racing	BMW	10	(Northern Ireland) Simon Reid	All
SMS / Nicholl Oil BMW	BMW	11	(Northern Ireland) David Allingham	All
Milenco by Padgett's Motorcycles	Honda	12	(England) Luke Mossey	All
Milenco by Padgett's Motorcycles	Honda	92	(New Zealand) Mitchell Rees	
Jonesy Racing / Armada Marine Cables	Honda	13	(England) Tommy Jones	
Whitney Motorsport Racing	Honda	14	(England) Max Lofthouse	
Whitney Motorsport Racing	Honda	51	(South Africa) Blaze Baker	All
JMB Racing – Premier Kia	Honda	15	(England) Jake Major-Bird	
H&H Motorcycles	Honda	16	(Isle of Man) Nathan Harrison	
B.art Racing Team	Honda	20	(Netherlands) Ricardo Brink	
B.art Racing Team	Honda	82	(Belgium) Jef Van Calster	
Lee Healey Racing by Staxson Ltd	Honda	24	(England) Lee Healey	
Dent Boy Ltd	BMW	25	(England) Mark Hewitt	
Dafabet Racing	Kawasaki	30	(Isle of Man) Michael Evans	
Bell Bikesport B&W Racing	BMW	32	(Northern Ireland) Carl Phillips	6-7, 10
241 Motorsports	Honda	34	(Italy) Kevin Milani	
241 Motorsports	Yamaha	41	(Republic of Ireland) Thomas O'Grady	
Grover Stunts and Exclusive Fishing	Honda	37	(England) Clayton Grover	
THC Racing – Honda	Honda	40	(England) Nick Cronin	
Nitrous Competitions Racing	Ducati	43	(England) David Williams	
Nitrous Competitions Racing / DRC Leathers	Ducati	86	(England) Jamie Dexter	
True Heroes Racing	Ducati	44	(England) Charlie White	
True Heroes Racing	Ducati	89	(England) Paul Cunvin	
Swann Racing by SMR	BMW	45	(Northern Ireland) Scott Swann	1-8
D & K KLN Racing	Honda	50	(England) Ryan Campion	
Kam Dixon Racing	Honda	52	(England) Kam Dixon	1-5, 7-10
MY-WET.com / NW Racing	Honda	54	(England) Ramone Hunte	
Jones Dorling Racing	BMW	55	(England) Ash Beech	All
Exersci Honda	Honda	56	(England) Tommy Fielding	
CM Racing	Honda	59	(England) Caiden Wilkinson	
Armada SC31 Racing	Honda	63	(England) Luca Jennings	
Armada SC31 Racing	Honda	21	(England) Tom Ward	
Armada SC31 Racing	Honda	27	(England) Tom Oliver	4, 10
Armada SC31 Racing	Honda	23	(Finland) Eemeli Lahti	1-2, 6
Armada SC31 Racing	Honda	31	(England) Sam Cox	
SAF Holland Honda	Honda	65	(England) Josh Owens	All
SAF Holland Honda	Honda	69	(England) Harrison Crosby	
SAF Holland Honda	Honda	77	(England) Finley Arscott	
Trackdudes powered by Fortis Racing	BMW	67	(England) Richard White	
Green Power Motorsports	Honda	78	(England) Dan Stamper	
Conrod MotorSport	BMW	79	(Isle of Man) Conor Cummins	
EightZero Racing	Honda	80	(Scotland) Callum Bey	
FnF Racing Ducati Hailsham	Ducati	81	(England) Scott Halliday	
British Army Motorsport Association	Honda	84	(England) Gavin Watts	
Thompson Racing by Bishops Lane Garage	Honda	85	(England) Karl Thompson	10
MGR Racing	Honda	87	(England) Jake Hopper	
Motorrad Central Edinburgh by MLav Racing	BMW	88	(Scotland) Lewis Rollo	1-8
Resido Racing	Honda	90	(England) Craig Kennelly	10
IN Competition Racing Ltd	Aprilia	91	(England) Jack Bednarek	1-6, 8-10
Fender BCS Racing	BMW	93	(England) Brandon Petty	
Symonds Racing	Honda	95	(England) Max Symonds	
Whitecliffe CDH Racing	Honda	99	(England) Ben Luxton	

== Race Calendar ==
2026 British Superstock UK Race Locations

Round		Circuit	Date
1	R1	Oulton Park (International Circuit, Cheshire)	2–4 May
2	R1	Donington Park (Grand Prix Circuit, Leicestershire)	15–17 May
3	R1	Knockhill Racing Circuit (Fife)	19–21 June
3	R2	Knockhill Racing Circuit (Fife)	19–21 June
4	R1	Snetterton Motor Racing Circuit (300 Circuit, Norfolk)	3–5 July
5	R1	Brands Hatch (Grand Prix Circuit, Kent)	17–19 July
5	R2	Brands Hatch (Grand Prix Circuit, Kent)	17–19 July
6	R1	Oulton Park (International Circuit, Cheshire)	31 July–1 August
6	R2	Oulton Park (International Circuit, Cheshire)	31 July–1 August
7	R1	Thruxton Circuit (Hampshire)	14–16 August
8	R1	Cadwell Park (Lincolnshire)	29–31 August
8	R2	Cadwell Park (Lincolnshire)	29–31 August
9	R1	Donington Park (Grand Prix Circuit, Leicestershire)	2–4 October
9	R2	Donington Park (Grand Prix Circuit, Leicestershire)	2–4 October
The Showdown Finale
10	R1	Brands Hatch (Grand Prix Circuit, Kent)	16–18 October
10	R2	Brands Hatch (Grand Prix Circuit, Kent)	16–18 October

== Results ==
Main Season
Round		Circuit	Date	Pole position	Fastest lap	Winning rider	Source
1	R1	(England) Oulton Park	4 May	(Northern Ireland) David Allingham	(Northern Ireland) David Allingham	(Northern Ireland) David Allingham	
2	R1	(England) Donington Park	17 May	(Northern Ireland) David Allingham	(Northern Ireland) Simon Reid	(Northern Ireland) David Allingham	
3	R1	(Scotland) Knockhill	20 June	(Northern Ireland) Scott Swann	(Northern Ireland) Scott Swann	(Northern Ireland) Scott Swann	
3	R2	(Scotland) Knockhill	21 June	(Northern Ireland) Scott Swann	(England) Luke Mossey	(Northern Ireland) David Allingham	
4	R1	(England) Snetterton	5 July	(Northern Ireland) Simon Reid	(Scotland) Lewis Rollo	(Northern Ireland) David Allingham	
5	R1	(England) Brands Hatch	18 July	(England) Luke Mossey	(Northern Ireland) David Allingham	(Northern Ireland) David Allingham	
5	R2	(England) Brands Hatch	19 July	(Northern Ireland) David Allingham	(Northern Ireland) Scott Swann	(Northern Ireland) David Allingham	
6	R1	(England) Oulton Park	1 August	(Northern Ireland) Scott Swann	(Northern Ireland) Scott Swann	(Northern Ireland) David Allingham	
6	R2	(England) Oulton Park	2 August	(Northern Ireland) Scott Swann	(Northern Ireland) David Allingham	(Northern Ireland) Scott Swann	
7	R1	(England) Thruxton	16 August	(Northern Ireland) Scott Swann	(England) Luke Mossey	(England) Luke Mossey	
8	R1	(England) Cadwell Park	30 August	(England) Luke Mossey	(Northern Ireland) Scott Swann	(England) Luke Mossey	
8	R2	(England) Cadwell Park	31 August	(Northern Ireland) Scott Swann	(Australia) Billy McConnell	(Northern Ireland) David Allingham	
9	R1	(England) Donington Park	3 October	(Northern Ireland) David Allingham	(England) Luke Mossey	(Northern Ireland) David Allingham	
9	R2	(England) Donington Park	4 October	(England) Luke Mossey	(England) Luke Mossey	(England) Luke Mossey	
10	R1	(England) Brands Hatch	17 October	(Northern Ireland) David Allingham	(England) Luke Mossey	(Northern Ireland) David Allingham	
10	R2	(England) Brands Hatch	18 October	(England) Luke Mossey	(Australia) Billy McConnell	(Australia) Billy McConnell	

== Championship Standings ==
Points are awarded to the top fifteen finishers. A rider has to finish the race to earn points.

Position	1st	2nd	3rd	4th	5th	6th	7th	8th	9th	10th	11th	12th	13th	14th	15th
Points	25	22	20	18	16	14	12	10	8	6	5	4	3	2	1

Scoring system in the season finale

Points are awarded to the top fifteen finishers. A rider has to finish the race to earn points.

Position	1st	2nd	3rd	4th	5th	6th	7th	8th	9th	10th	11th	12th	13th	14th	15th
Points	35	30	27	24	22	20	18	16	14	12	10	8	6	4	2

Pos.	Rider	Bike	Main season														Finale		Pts.
Pos.	Rider	Bike	OUL (England)	DON (England)	KNO (Scotland)		SNE (England)	BRH (England)		OUL (England)		THR (England)	CAD (England)		DON (England)		BRH (England)		Pts.
Pos.	Rider	Bike	R1	R1	R1	R2	R1	R1	R2	R1	R2	R1	R1	R2	R1	R2	R1	R2	Pts.
1	(Northern Ireland) David Allingham	BMW	1^{P F}	1^{P}	3	1	1	1^{F}	1^{P}	1	2^{F}	3	3	1	1^{P}	2	1^{P}	8	380
2	(England) Luke Mossey	Honda	2	5	2	2^{F}	3	2^{P}	2	2	Ret	1^{F}	1^{P}	2	2^{F}	1^{P F}	2^{F}	NS^{P}	317
3	(England) Josh Owens	Honda	7	16	6	5	8	5	Ret	3	4	9	4	5	6	4	4	6	224
4	(England) Matt Truelove	Honda	6	2	7	6	7	7	6	7	8	2			DNS	DNS	10	3	183
5	(Australia) Billy McConnell	BMW						6	5			6	2	3^{F}	Ret	7	3	1^{F}	160
6	(Northern Ireland) Scott Swann	BMW	4	14	1^{P F}	3^{P}	6	4	Ret^{F}	Ret^{P F}	1^{P}	4^{P}	Ret^{F}	4^{P}					158
7	(England) Ash Barnes	Honda	14	6	10	9	10	DNS	DNS	6	7	Ret	5	7	5	6	8	5	158
8	(Northern Ireland) Simon Reid	BMW	18	3^{F}	8	8	2^{P}	9	7	8	Ret	11	9	9	7	8	7	Ret	153
9	(Scotland) Lewis Rollo	BMW	3	Ret	4	4	5^{F}	3	3	15	3	5	Ret	DNS					149
10	(Scotland) Declan Connell	Honda	8	4	5	Ret	Ret	Ret	Ret	4	6				3	5	33	Ret	112
11	(England) Ash Beech	BMW	9	9	Ret	7	4	8	Ret	9	11	16	10	12	9	Ret	6	Ret	107
12	(South Africa) Blaze Baker	Honda	21	7	9	10	Ret	14	8	10	9	12	11	Ret	10	10	14	7	95
13	(England) Kam Dixon	Honda	Ret	NS	11	11	12	13	10			8	8	11	8	9	9	Ret	80
14	(England) Ian Hutchinson	BMW	11										6	6	4	3			71
15	(England) Tom Oliver	Honda					9										5	2	60
16	(England) Jack Bednarek	Aprilia	17	25	17	15	16	16	12	13	14		7	10	11	11	12	11	56
17	(Finland) Eemeli Lahti	Honda	5	22						5	5								48
18	(Northern Ireland) Carl Phillips	BMW								11	Ret	7					13	4	47
19	(Netherlands) Jaimie van Sikkelerus	Honda			14	14	18	Ret	Ret	14	12	18	14	NS	12	12	11	9	44
20	(England) Daniel Brooks	Honda	13	15	12	13	11	12	9			14	13	Ret					33
Pos.	Rider	Bike	R1	R1	R1	R2	R1	R1	R2	R1	R2	R1	R1	R2	R1	R2	R1	R2	Pts.
Pos.	Rider	Bike	OUL (England)	DON (England)	KNO (Scotland)		SNE (England)	BRH (England)		OUL (England)		THR (England)	CAD (England)		DON (England)		BRH (England)		Pts.

Race key
Colour	Result
Gold	Winner
Silver	2nd place
Bronze	3rd place
Green	Points finish
Blue	Non-points finish
Blue	Non-classified finish (NC)
Purple	Retired (Ret)
Red	Did not qualify (DNQ)
Black	Disqualified (DSQ)
White	Did not start (DNS)
White	Withdrew (WD)
White	Race cancelled (C)
Blank	Did not practice (DNP)
Blank	Excluded (EX)
Blank	Did not arrive (DNA)
Blank	Did not enter (empty cell)
Annotation	Meaning
P	Pole position
F	Fastest lap
Rider key
Colour	Meaning
Light blue	Rookie rider
