= 2026 Sidecar Motocross World Championship =

46th season of the FIM Sidecarcross World Championship

2026 FIM Sidecarcross World Championship

Championship
- Series: FIM Sidecarcross World Championship
- Season: 46th
- Rounds: 12
- Duration: 18 April – 20 September 2026

Standings
- Leading team: (Belgium) Marvin Vanluchene / (Netherlands) Ben van den Bogaart

The 2026 FIM Sidecarcross World Championship was the 46th season of the Sidecarcross World Championship, a sidecarcross competition for two-person teams (a driver and a passenger) organised by the Fédération Internationale de Motocyclisme (FIM). The championship was contested over twelve Grands Prix held across Europe between April and September 2026.

Koen Hermans and Ben van den Bogaart entered the season as the reigning World Champions, having won the 2025 title together. For 2026, the pairing split: van den Bogaart moved to partner Marvin Vanluchene aboard the number 2 outfit, while Hermans took Dion Rietman as his passenger and retained the number 1 plate reserved for the defending champion.

After ten of the twelve rounds, Vanluchene and van den Bogaart led the championship, ahead of the French brothers Killian and Evan Prunier and the German–Austrian pairing of Tim Prümmer and Patrick Schneider.

== Format and scoring ==
A Grand Prix weekend consisted of two qualifying-group races (Group A and Group B) on the Saturday and two main races on the Sunday. Championship points were awarded to the top twenty finishers in each of the two main races, and to the top five finishers of each Saturday qualifying-group race; all of these count towards the championship total. In the case of a tie on points, the higher-placed team was determined by a countback of best race results, in accordance with the FIM sporting regulations.

Position	1st	2nd	3rd	4th	5th	6th	7th	8th	9th	10th	11th	12th	13th	14th	15th	16th	17th	18th	19th	20th
Race (each)	25	22	20	18	16	15	14	13	12	11	10	9	8	7	6	5	4	3	2	1
Qualifying (each)	5	4	3	2	1															

== Race calendar ==
The following twelve Grands Prix made up the 2026 calendar.

Round	Date	Country	Circuit / venue
1	18–19 April	France	Castelnau-de-Lévis
2	2–3 May	Czech Republic	Kramolín
3	9–10 May	Germany	Kleinhau
4	30–31 May	United Kingdom	Canada Heights
5	6–7 June	Poland	Gdańsk
6	13–14 June	Estonia	Karksi-Nuia
7	27–28 June	Belgium	Lommel
8	18–19 July	Germany	Straßbessenbach
9	25–26 July	Latvia	Madona
10	1–2 August	Lithuania	Anykščiai (Mickūnai MX Parkas)
11	12–13 September	Netherlands	Varsseveld
12	19–20 September	Germany	Rudersberg

=== SidecarCross and QuadCross of Nations ===
The FIM SidecarCross and QuadCross of Nations (SQXoN)—a non-championship team event contested by national squads—was scheduled for September 26 and 27, 2026, in Dardon, near Gueugnon, France, and was won for the first time by Team France.

== Results and standings ==
=== Grand Prix results ===
Overall Grand Prix winners are decided on combined points from the round's two main races.

Round	Circuit	Race 1 winner	Race 2 winner	Overall winner
1	Castelnau-de-Lévis	Killian Prunier / Evan Prunier	Killian Prunier / Evan Prunier	Killian Prunier / Evan Prunier
2	Kramolín	Marvin Vanluchene / Ben van den Bogaart	Marvin Vanluchene / Ben van den Bogaart	Marvin Vanluchene / Ben van den Bogaart
3	Kleinhau	Dan Foden / Noah Weinmann	Dan Foden / Noah Weinmann	Dan Foden / Noah Weinmann
4	Canada Heights	Brett Wilkinson / Joe Millard	Marvin Vanluchene / Ben van den Bogaart	Marvin Vanluchene / Ben van den Bogaart
5	Gdańsk	Marvin Vanluchene / Ben van den Bogaart	Killian Prunier / Evan Prunier	Killian Prunier / Evan Prunier
6	Karksi-Nuia	Marvin Vanluchene / Ben van den Bogaart	Marvin Vanluchene / Ben van den Bogaart	Marvin Vanluchene / Ben van den Bogaart
7	Lommel	Marvin Vanluchene / Ben van den Bogaart	Marvin Vanluchene / Ben van den Bogaart	Marvin Vanluchene / Ben van den Bogaart
8	Straßbessenbach	Tim Prümmer / Patrick Schneider	Marvin Vanluchene / Ben van den Bogaart	Tim Prümmer / Patrick Schneider
9	Madona	Daniels Lielbārdis / Bruno Lielbārdis	Marvin Vanluchene / Ben van den Bogaart	Marvin Vanluchene / Ben van den Bogaart
10	Anykščiai	Marvin Vanluchene / Ben van den Bogaart	Marvin Vanluchene / Ben van den Bogaart	Marvin Vanluchene / Ben van den Bogaart
11	Varsseveld	To be held		
12	Rudersberg	To be held		

=== Drivers' championship standings ===
Positions are given for the two main races of each round; the superscript is the team's qualifying-race points. Points are the season total after round 10 of 12.

Pos.	No.	Driver / Passenger	Castelnau-de-Lévis (France)		Kramolín (Czech Republic)		Kleinhau (Germany)		Canada Heights (United Kingdom)		Gdańsk (Poland)		Karksi-Nuia (Estonia)		Lommel (Belgium)		Straßbessenbach (Germany)		Madona (Latvia)		Anykščiai (Lithuania)		Varsseveld (Netherlands)	Rudersberg (Germany)	Points
1	2	(Belgium) Marvin Vanluchene / (Netherlands) Ben van den Bogaart	7	5	1^{+5}	1	2^{+4}	3	2^{+5}	1	1^{+5}	14	1^{+4}	1	1^{+5}	1	4^{+4}	1	2^{+4}	1	1^{+5}	1			482
2	94	(France) Killian Prunier / (France) Evan Prunier	1^{+5}	1	2^{+5}	3	3^{+5}	2	3^{+4}	2	2^{+5}	1	6	7	8^{+1}	8	2^{+5}	4	6^{+5}	5	4^{+3}	8			418
3	17	(Germany) Tim Prümmer / (Austria) Patrick Schneider	4^{+4}	3	3^{+4}	2	4^{+5}	5	NC^{+1}	7	3^{+3}	2	3^{+4}	3	3^{+5}	5	1^{+5}	2	3^{+3}	2	6^{+2}	6			401
4	199	(United Kingdom) Brett Wilkinson / (United Kingdom) Joe Millard	2^{+4}	2	NC^{+3}	4	NC^{+4}	4	1^{+5}	3	5^{+3}	3	4^{+3}	2	7	7	11^{+2}	6	5^{+4}	3	NC	NC			318
5	75	(Netherlands) Tim Leferink / (Netherlands) Sem Leferink	3^{+5}	4	8^{+4}	NC	14	NC	4^{+2}	5	13^{+4}	4	2^{+5}	NC	6	4	3^{+1}	3	7^{+5}	7	2^{+4}	3			313
6	101	(Latvia) Daniels Lielbārdis / (Latvia) Bruno Lielbārdis	20^{+1}	7	5	8	6^{+2}	8	5^{+2}	NC			NC^{+5}	4	2^{+3}	2	7^{+3}	20	1^{+2}	NC	7^{+1}	5			239
7	109	(Belgium) Davy Sanders / (Netherlands) Jens Vincent	8^{+3}	6	NC^{+2}	6	8^{+2}	9	7^{+3}	6	NC	NC	5	5	16	13	10^{+2}	NC	10^{+1}	8	8^{+4}	4			225
8	114	(Netherlands) Koen Grondman / (Netherlands) Ross Vincent	12	20	9	10	12	16	10	12	8	7	10^{+2}	8	5^{+3}	6	18	15	4^{+2}	4	9	9			225
9	10	(United Kingdom) Dan Foden / (Germany) Noah Weinmann	6^{+3}	11	4^{+3}	5	1^{+3}	1	8^{+3}	8							12	5	8^{+3}	6	5^{+3}	20			223
10	1	(Netherlands) Koen Hermans / (Netherlands) Dion Rietman	11^{+1}	9	13	7	5^{+3}	6	6^{+4}	4	4^{+1}	15	NC	6	10	17	9^{+4}	9	NC	NC	NC	NC			199
11	418	(Netherlands) Stephan Wijers / (Germany) Joel Hoffmann	9^{+2}	10	7^{+1}	9	NC^{+1}	11	14	NC	7^{+1}	16	8^{+2}	10	9^{+4}	9			9	9	10^{+1}	7			194
12	31	(Netherlands) Julian Veldman / (France) Rodolphe Lebreton			6^{+1}	NC	7^{+1}	7			6^{+2}	5			4^{+2}	3	6^{+3}	NC			3^{+5}	2			183
13	99	(Netherlands) Thom van de Lagemaat / (Netherlands) Han van Hal	16	16	11	11	19	14	9	9	10	8	11^{+1}	14	11	10	20	16							132
14	936	(France) Gwendal Carcreff / (France) Mathis Hupon	17	13	16	15	9	12	NC	10	11	11	13	15			13	10							108
15	20	(Germany) Adrian Peter / (Germany) Julian Zimmermann	10	12	10	NC	10	17	11	11	18^{+4}	6			NC	NC	17	13							100
16	40	(France) Romaric Chanteloup / (France) Josselyn Chanteloup	15	17	14	13	11	13	NC	NC	12^{+2}	9	15	13	20	NC	NC	NC	NC	NC					81
17	111	(Netherlands) Daniël Willemsen / (Czech Republic) Michal Gabor			NC	NC			17	NC			12^{+1}	11	13	11	NC	11	11	10	NC	NC			73
18	914	(Germany) Patrick Hengster / (Germany) Justin Blume	13	14	17	NC	17	NC	18	16	9	10					15	12							69
19	32	(Belgium) Kim De Cock / (Belgium) Stijn De Vylder	NC	19	19	17	NC	NC	NC	NC	14	12	17	20	NC	NC	NC	NC	17	14	11	10			61
20	711	(Estonia) Markus Normak / (Latvia) Tomass Daniels Dukulis									17	18	7^{+3}	9					13^{+1}	11	NC	NC			55
21	13	(United Kingdom) Michael Hodges / (United Kingdom) Ryan Henderson	14	8			20	10	NC^{+1}	NC					18	20	NC	17							41
22	93	(Switzerland) Marco Heinzer / (Switzerland) Remo Heinzer			12^{+2}	12											14^{+1}	8							41
23	81	(France) Grégory Raymond / (Lithuania) Viktorija Vareikaitė	NC	15			NC	NC									NC	NC	16	12	15	11			36
24	191	(Lithuania) Jonas Pirtinas / (Latvia) Lotārs Aleksejevs									16	13							15	NC	13	13			35
25	33	(Belgium) Niels Hendrickx / (Belgium) Tayim Kaethoven			NC	18	18	20							12	12	19	14							34
26	193	(France) Guennady Auvray / (Belgium) Jarno Steegmans	5^{+2}	NC													5	NC							34
27	54	(Estonia) Ülar Karing / (Estonia) Sten Niitsoo									15	17	14	NC					14	13	NC	NC			32
28	444	(Estonia) Robert Lihtsa / (Estonia) Oliver Sebastian Lamp											9	12					12	NC	NC	NC			30
29	24	(United Kingdom) George Kinge / (United Kingdom) Liam Hodges					13	19	15	13					NC^{+1}	19	NC	NC							27
30	84	(Switzerland) Remo Käser / (Switzerland) Luca Käser															8	7							27
31	21	(Latvia) Rihards Rupeiks / (Latvia) Markuss Tučis									19	NC	16	18							14	12			26
32	537	(Germany) Niklas Hotze / (Belgium) Niki Debruyne													15	NC	NC	NC	20	18	12	14			26
33	98	(Netherlands) Ijen Kops / (Netherlands) Robin Könst					16	18	NC	14					NC	14									22
34	169	(Germany) Nick Uhlig / (Germany) Philipp Oettel			15	16	15	NC											NC	NC	NC	NC			17
35	244	(Germany) Leon Hofmann / (Germany) Leon Freygang			18	14											16	19							17
36	34	(Estonia) Tanel Reesna / (Finland) Valtteri Mäki											NC	17					NC	16	16	19			16
37	100	(United Kingdom) Jake Brown / (United Kingdom) Christopher Booth	NC	NC					12	15															15
38	96	(Latvia) Kaspars Lubgans / (Latvia) Martins Antons																	19	19	17	15			14
39	212	(United Kingdom) Jack Rogers / (United Kingdom) Ryan Beavis					NC	NC	16	17					19	18	NC	NC							14
40	22	(Netherlands) Bjorn van den Heuij / (Netherlands) Sten van den Heuij			NC	20	NC	NC							14	16	NC	NC							13
41	8	(Denmark) Jacob Jensen / (Denmark) Jan Petersen																	18	15	20	NC			10
42	43	(Estonia) Argo Põldsaar / (Estonia) Tom Küüsmaa											19	19					NC	NC	19	17			10
43	194	(Lithuania) Žygimantas Pirtinas / (Lithuania) Martynas Žaliauskas											20	NC					NC	20	18	16			10
44	772	(Switzerland) Sven Buob / (Switzerland) Marc Buob					NC	15									NC	18							9
45	12	(United Kingdom) Anthony Milliar / (United Kingdom) Jon Hunt							13	NC															8
46	51	(France) Stéphane Gouin / (France) Kyllian Gouin	18	18	NC	19	NC	NC									NC	NC							8
47	72	(Netherlands) Frank Mulders / (Netherlands) Marc van Deutekom													NC^{+2}	15	NC	NC							8
48	56	(United Kingdom) Luke Banks / (United Kingdom) Chris Pannell					NC	NC	19	NC					17	NC									6
49	499	(Finland) Jere Padinki / (Finland) Niko Padinki											NC	NC					NC	17					4
50	9	(Belgium) Kelly Debruyne / (Netherlands) Aivar van de Wiel							NC	19	20	NC													3
51	92	(United Kingdom) Sam Osbaldiston / (United Kingdom) Thomas Mackay							NC	18					NC	NC									3
52	141	(Netherlands) Boyd Verhees / (Belgium) Andy Schlinnertz	19	NC	20	NC			NC	NC															3
53	551	(Lithuania) Renatas Jankauskas / (Lithuania) Arvydas Davidonis																			NC	18			3
54	131	(United Kingdom) Tony Grahame / (United Kingdom) Jak Watson					NC	NC	20	20							NC	NC							2

Key
	Winner
	2nd place
	3rd place
	Points finish (4th–20th)
NC	Took part but scored no points (outside the top 20, retired or did not start)

Blank cells indicate the team did not contest that round. Positions are reconstructed from published race points; retirements (Ret), non-starts (DNS) and non-qualifications (DNQ) are all marked as NC.

== See also ==
- Sidecarcross World Championship
- List of Sidecarcross World Championship records and statistics
- 2025 Sidecar Motocross World Championship
