= 2026 Austria Formula Cup =

Motorsport season

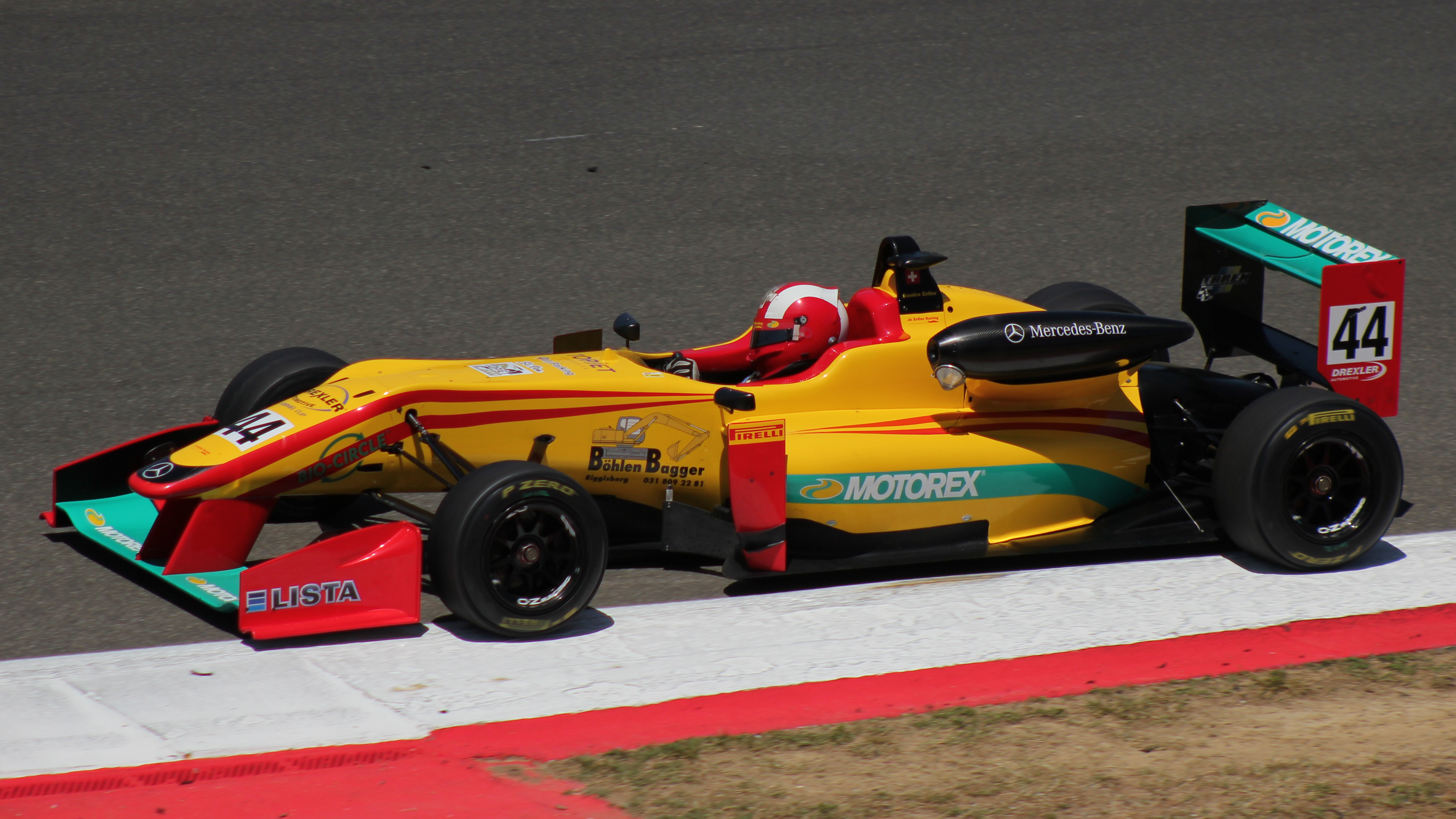
Sandro Zeller (pictured in 2025) took his ninth title in the highest class of the Austria Formula Cup after winning twelve races driving for Jo Zeller Racing.

The 2026 Austria Formula Cup was the 45th season of the Austria Formula Cup. It was the series' first season since 2012 to run without a title sponsorship, as the championship ran as the Remus F3 Cup from 2013 to 2018 and as the Drexler-Automotive Formula Cup from 2019 to 2025.

The championship featured a mix of professional and gentleman drivers, competing in both contemporary and earlier-generation Formula 3 cars as well as Formula Renault 2.0 machinery. The 2026 season was held over eight race weekends across Europe, beginning in April at the Red Bull Ring and concluding in October at Mugello Circuit. The championship continued its cooperation with the F2000 Italian Formula Trophy, with the two series sharing grids and race slots for multiple rounds.

Jo Zeller Racing's Sandro Zeller defended his Formula 3 Cup title, now the overall championship title, with two weekends to spare, thereby claiming his ninth title in the highest class of the Austria Formula Cup. In doing so, he also helped his team win the Teams' Championship title. ADAC Südbayern driver Nicolas Löffler took the title in the Formula 3 Trophy, while Henry Morrogh Drivers School's Matteo Zoccali was victorious in the Formula Regional Class and privateer Sarene Ziffel took the Formula Light Cup title.

== Teams and drivers ==
The class system was restructured for the 2026 season: The Formula 3 Cup, previously a separate class, became the overall ranking and encompassed all cars entered, with entrants in the Formula 3 Trophy, Formula Regional and Formula Light Cup classes now collecting points both in the overall ranking and their separate classes.

=== Formula 3 Cup-only entries ===
Team	No.	Driver	Car	Engine	Rounds
(Italy) Corbetta Racing	2	(Italy) Laurence Balestrini	Dallara F314	Volkswagen	1–2, 4–5
(Italy) Corbetta Racing	46	(Italy) Riccardo Perego	Dallara F312	Volkswagen	2, 5, 8
(Switzerland) Jo Zeller Racing	11	(Switzerland) Kurt Böhlen	Dallara F316	Mercedes HWA	1, 5, 7–8
(Switzerland) Jo Zeller Racing	44	(Switzerland) Sandro Zeller	Dallara F312	Mercedes HWA	1–2, 4–8
(Austria) Franz Wöss Racing	12	(Switzerland) Christof Ledermann	Dallara F320	Mercedes HWA	1–2, 4–8
(Austria) Franz Wöss Racing	12	(Austria) Ludwig Kronawitter	Dallara F320	Mercedes HWA	3
(Austria) Franz Wöss Racing	19	(Republic of Ireland) Cian Carey	Dallara F320	Mercedes HWA	8
(Italy) Puresport	14	(Italy) Andrea Benalli	Dallara F314	Mercedes HWA	1–2, 4–5
(Italy) Puresport	14	(United States) Alex Lima	Dallara F317	Volkswagen	8
(Italy) Nannini Racing	18	(Italy) Marco Falci	Dallara F314	Volkswagen	1–2, 4
(Italy) Nannini Racing	42	(Italy) Davide Pedetti	Dallara F317	Toyota	8
(Italy) G Motorsport	20	(Denmark) Stig Larsen	Dallara F320	Mercedes HWA	1–2, 4–5, 8
(Italy) F. C. Racing	41	(Italy) Franco Cimarelli	Dallara F312	Volkswagen	2, 4
(Italy) FG Motorsport	49	(Italy) Filippo Golin	Dallara F317	Volkswagen	5
(Austria) Red Rose Racing by LRT	81	(Austria) Michael Fischer	Dallara F315	Mercedes HWA	1–3
(Italy) One Competition	88	(Italy) Francesco Solfaroli	Dallara F317	Volkswagen	8
(Hungary) Magyar Racing Team	146	(Hungary) János Magyar	Tatuus Formula Master	Honda	1, 5–7
(Italy) Antonino Racing	777	(Italy) Antonino Pellegrino	Dallara F393	Toyota	4

=== Formula 3 Trophy entries ===
Team	No.	Driver	Car	Engine	Rounds
(Switzerland) Jo Zeller Racing	4	(Switzerland) Urs Rüttimann	Dallara F308	Volkswagen	2, 5
(Italy) Facondini Racing	6	(Italy) Enrico Milani	Dallara F308	FPT	2, 4
(Italy) Facondini Racing	88	(Italy) Francesco Solfaroli	Dallara F317	Volkswagen	4–5
(Italy) Speed Motor	7	(Italy) Karim Sartori	Dallara F308	Toyota	1–2, 5, 8
(Germany) Team Hoffmann Racing	9	(United Kingdom) Lee Cunningham	Dallara F314	Toyota	1–3, 6–7
(Germany) Team Hoffmann Racing	22	(Germany) André Petropoulos	Dallara F316	Opel Spiess	1–4, 6–7
(Italy) Giordano Motorsport	10	(Italy) Luca Iannacone	Dallara F308	FPT	1–3, 5–8
(Italy) Giordano Motorsport	21	(Italy) Umberto Vaglio	Dallara F313	Toyota	2, 4–5, 8
(Italy) Giordano Motorsport	21	(Italy) Giovanni Giordano	Dallara F317	Toyota	6
(Italy) Corbetta Racing	13	(Italy) Sergio Terrini	Dallara F308	FPT	5, 8
(Italy) Corbetta Racing	51	(Italy) Angelo Comi	Mygale F3	FPT	5, 8
(Italy) Bellspeed	27	(Italy) Patrick Bellezza	Dallara F300	Fiat	2, 4, 8
(Italy) One Competition	28	(Italy) Federico Porri	Dallara F308	FPT	4
(France) Sud Motorsport	33	(Italy) Giuseppe Marinaro	Dallara F310	FPT	5, 8
(Italy) Nannini Racing	42	(Italy) Davide Pedetti	Dallara F317	Toyota	2, 4
(Czech Republic) Chabr Motorsport	54	(Czech Republic) Tomáš Chabr	Dallara F308	Mugen Honda	7
Racing in Italy	75	(Italy) Mei Shibi	Dallara F308	Volkswagen	5
(Italy) Ruote Scoperte	79	(Italy) Fabio Turchetto	Dallara F308	FPT	5
(Germany) ADAC Südbayern e.V.	91	(Germany) Nicolas Löffler	Dallara F312	Mercedes HWA	1–3, 5–8
(Italy) Team Perodi	92	(Italy) Romano Cataldo	Dallara F316	Toyota	1
(Austria) Neuhauser Racing Team	140	(Austria) Hannes Neuhauser	Dallara F303	Opel Spiess	1
(Austria) APE Racing	911	(Austria) Nikolay Takev	Dallara F310	Opel Spiess	6–7

=== Formula Regional Class entries ===
Team	No.	Driver	Car	Engine	Rounds
(Italy) Viola Formula Racing	3	(France) Arthur Lorimier	Tatuus F3 T-326	Renault	5, 8
(Germany) Team Hoffmann Racing	3	(Austria) Karlheinz Matzinger	Tatuus F3 T-318	Alfa Romeo	3
(Germany) Team Hoffmann Racing	17	(Austria) Walter Stending	Tatuus F3 T-318	Alfa Romeo	2, 7
(Germany) Team Hoffmann Racing	98	(Czech Republic) Václav Šafář	Tatuus F3 T-318	Alfa Romeo	7
(Germany) Team Hoffmann Racing	122	(Austria) Dr. Norbert Groer	Tatuus F3 T-318	Alfa Romeo	1–3, 6–8
(Italy) Valentino Racing Team	4	(Italy) Valentino Carofano	Tatuus F3 T-318	Alfa Romeo	4
(Austria) Markus Leidinger	8	(Austria) Markus Leidinger	Tatuus F3 T-318	Alfa Romeo	1, 5
(Italy) Alpha Racing	32	(Italy) Sandro de Virgilis	Tatuus F3 T-318	Renault	4
(Italy) Ruote Scoperte	33	(Italy) Andrea Masci	Tatuus F3 T-318	Renault	4
(Italy) Henry Morrogh Drivers School	37	(Italy) Matteo Zoccali	Tatuus F3 T-318	Renault	1–2, 4–5, 7–8
(Hungary) Kermor Motorsport	68	(Hungary) Zeno Kovacs	Tatuus F3 T-318	Renault	4–8
(Austria) Red Rose Racing by LRT	101	(Austria) Norbert Lenzenweger	Tatuus F3 T-318	Renault	1

=== Formula Light Cup entries ===
Team	No.	Driver	Car	Engine	Rounds
(Italy) Henry Morrogh Drivers School	9	(Italy) Giovanni Ciccarelli	Tatuus F4 T-421	Abarth	2
(France) Sud Motorsport	9	(Italy) Armando Stola	Tatuus FR2.0	Renault	8
(Italy) PLM Racing	18	(Italy) Domenico Terron	Tatuus FR2.0	Renault	5
(France) Team Thomas Clausi	23	(France) Bruno Mottez	Tatuus FR2.0	Renault	5
(Italy) Derva Corse ASD	24	(Italy) Marco de Toffol	Tatuus FR2.0	Renault	4
(Italy) Derva Corse ASD	24	(Italy) Stefano Noal	Tatuus FR2.0	Renault	5
(France) Team Sarene Ziffel	31	(France) Sarene Ziffel	Tatuus FR2.0	Renault	1–2, 5, 8
(Italy) Vessicchio Corse	50	(Italy) Antonio Vessicchio	Tatuus FR2.0	Renault	4
(Italy) Valdelsa Classic Motor Club	59	(Italy) Riccardo Rossi	Tatuus FR2.0	Renault	2
(Czech Republic) JMT Racing	65	(Czech Republic) Roman Roubíček	Tatuus F4 T-421	Abarth	6–7
(Austria) Geier Racing	66	(Austria) Alexander Geier	Tatuus FR2.0	Renault	1, 5
(Hungary) Kermor Motorsport	114	(Hungary) Vida Benedek	Tatuus FR2.0	Renault	3–7
(Hungary) Makolm Motorsport	127	(Hungary) Christopher Oslanec	Tatuus FR2.0	Renault	6
(Austria) Red Rose Racing by LRT	127	(Austria) Jürgen Berger	Tatuus FR2.0	Renault	1
(Austria) Red Rose Racing by LRT	175	(Austria) Alexander Fritz	Tatuus FR2.0	Renault	1–2, 6–7
(Austria) Red Rose Racing by LRT	181	(Austria) Stefan Eisinger-Sewald	Tatuus FR2.0	Renault	1–2
(Austria) Franz Wöss Racing	125	(United States) Robert Siska	Tatuus FR2.0	Renault	3, 5
(Austria) MSC Rottenegg	133	(Austria) Marco Milani	Tatuus FR2.0	Renault	1
(Switzerland) Jo Zeller Racing	717	(Switzerland) Walter Mani	Tatuus FR2.0	Renault	6

== Race calendar ==
The 2026 calendar was announced on 15 January 2026. After only holding seven events in 2025, the calendar grew back to eight events for 2026. The Red Bull Ring and the Vallelunga Circuit returned after one- and two-year absences, while the series also returned to the Automotodrom Grobnik for the first time since 2001. These rounds came at the expense of the Hockenheimring, which was not featured on the calendar for the first time since 2021, and the Misano World Circuit, which did not return after its debut in 2025.

R.		Circuit	Date	Support bill	Map of circuit locations
1	R1	(Austria) Red Bull Ring, Spielberg	11 April	F2000 Italian Formula Trophy; Formula 4 CEZ Championship	2026 Austria Formula Cup is located in Europe
1	R2	(Austria) Red Bull Ring, Spielberg	12 April	F2000 Italian Formula Trophy; Formula 4 CEZ Championship	2026 Austria Formula Cup is located in Europe
2	SR	(Italy) Imola Circuit, Imola	25 April	Italian GT Championship Sprint Cup; Italian Sport Prototype Championship	2026 Austria Formula Cup is located in Europe
2	FR	(Italy) Imola Circuit, Imola	26 April	Italian GT Championship Sprint Cup; Italian Sport Prototype Championship	2026 Austria Formula Cup is located in Europe
3	R1	(Croatia) Automotodrom Grobnik, Čavle	16 May	TCR Eastern Europe Touring Car Series; GT Cup Series	2026 Austria Formula Cup is located in Europe
3	R2	(Croatia) Automotodrom Grobnik, Čavle	17 May	TCR Eastern Europe Touring Car Series; GT Cup Series	2026 Austria Formula Cup is located in Europe
4	SR	(Italy) Vallelunga Circuit, Campagnano di Roma	4 July	Porsche Carrera Cup Italia; GT4 Italian Series	2026 Austria Formula Cup is located in Europe
4	FR	(Italy) Vallelunga Circuit, Campagnano di Roma	5 July	Porsche Carrera Cup Italia; GT4 Italian Series	2026 Austria Formula Cup is located in Europe
5	SR	(Italy) Monza Circuit, Monza	1 August	FX Racing Weekend; Eurocup-3; Prototype Cup Europe	2026 Austria Formula Cup is located in Europe
5	FR	(Italy) Monza Circuit, Monza	2 August	FX Racing Weekend; Eurocup-3; Prototype Cup Europe	2026 Austria Formula Cup is located in Europe
6	R1	Slovakia Ring, Orechová Potôň	22 August	TCR Eastern Europe Touring Car Series; GT Cup Series	2026 Austria Formula Cup is located in Europe
6	R2	Slovakia Ring, Orechová Potôň	23 August	TCR Eastern Europe Touring Car Series; GT Cup Series	2026 Austria Formula Cup is located in Europe
7	R1	(Czech Republic) Brno Circuit, Brno	12 September	Formula 4 CEZ Championship; GT Cup Series	2026 Austria Formula Cup is located in Europe
7	R2	(Czech Republic) Brno Circuit, Brno	13 September	Formula 4 CEZ Championship; GT Cup Series	2026 Austria Formula Cup is located in Europe
8	SR	(Italy) Mugello Circuit, Scarperia e San Piero	17 October	Italian National GT Challenge; Mitjet Italia Racing Series	2026 Austria Formula Cup is located in Europe
8	FR	(Italy) Mugello Circuit, Scarperia e San Piero	18 October	Italian National GT Challenge; Mitjet Italia Racing Series	2026 Austria Formula Cup is located in Europe

== Race results ==
R.		Circuit	Pole position	Fastest lap	Winning driver	Winning team	F3 Trophy winner	Formula Regional winner	Formula Light Cup winner
1	R1	(Austria) Red Bull Ring	(Switzerland) Sandro Zeller	(Switzerland) Sandro Zeller	(Switzerland) Sandro Zeller	(Switzerland) Jo Zeller Racing	(Austria) Hannes Neuhauser	(Austria) Norbert Lenzenweger	(France) Sarene Ziffel
1	R2	(Austria) Red Bull Ring	(Switzerland) Sandro Zeller	(Italy) Andrea Benalli	(Switzerland) Sandro Zeller	(Switzerland) Jo Zeller Racing	(Germany) Nicolas Löffler	(Austria) Norbert Lenzenweger	(France) Sarene Ziffel
2	SR	(Italy) Imola Circuit		(Italy) Riccardo Perego	(Italy) Andrea Benalli	(Italy) Puresport	(Germany) André Petropoulos	(Italy) Matteo Zoccali	(France) Sarene Ziffel
2	FR	(Italy) Imola Circuit	(Switzerland) Sandro Zeller	(Austria) Michael Fischer	(Switzerland) Sandro Zeller	(Switzerland) Jo Zeller Racing	(Germany) Nicolas Löffler	(Italy) Matteo Zoccali	(France) Sarene Ziffel
3	R1	(Croatia) Automotodrom; Grobnik	(Austria) Michael Fischer	(Austria) Michael Fischer	(Austria) Michael Fischer	(Austria) Red Rose Racing by LRT	(Germany) André Petropoulos	(Austria) Karlheinz Matzinger	(Hungary) Vida Benedek
3	R2	(Croatia) Automotodrom; Grobnik	(Austria) Michael Fischer	(Austria) Michael Fischer	(Austria) Michael Fischer	(Austria) Red Rose Racing by LRT	(Germany) André Petropoulos	(Austria) Karlheinz Matzinger	(Hungary) Vida Benedek
4	SR	(Italy) Vallelunga Circuit		(Switzerland) Sandro Zeller	(Switzerland) Sandro Zeller	(Switzerland) Jo Zeller Racing	(Germany) André Petropoulos	(Hungary) Zeno Kovacs	(Hungary) Vida Benedek
4	FR	(Italy) Vallelunga Circuit	(Switzerland) Sandro Zeller	(Switzerland) Sandro Zeller	(Switzerland) Sandro Zeller	(Switzerland) Jo Zeller Racing	(Italy) Franco Cimarelli	(Italy) Valentino Carofano	(Hungary) Vida Benedek
5	SR	(Italy) Monza Circuit		(Switzerland) Sandro Zeller	(Italy) Riccardo Perego	(Italy) Corbetta Racing	(Italy) Fabio Turchetto	(Austria) Markus Leidinger	(France) Sarene Ziffel
5	FR	(Italy) Monza Circuit	(Switzerland) Sandro Zeller	(Switzerland) Sandro Zeller	(Switzerland) Sandro Zeller	(Switzerland) Jo Zeller Racing	(Germany) Nicolas Löffler	(France) Arthur Lorimier	(Hungary) Vida Benedek
6	R1	Slovakia Ring	(Switzerland) Sandro Zeller	(Hungary) János Magyar	(Switzerland) Sandro Zeller	(Switzerland) Jo Zeller Racing	(Germany) Nicolas Löffler	(Austria) Dr. Norbert Groer	(Hungary) Christopher Oslanec
6	R2	Slovakia Ring	(Switzerland) Sandro Zeller	(Switzerland) Sandro Zeller	(Switzerland) Sandro Zeller	(Switzerland) Jo Zeller Racing	(Germany) Nicolas Löffler	(Austria) Dr. Norbert Groer	(Hungary) Christopher Oslanec
7	R1	(Czech Republic) Brno Circuit	(Switzerland) Sandro Zeller	(Switzerland) Sandro Zeller	(Switzerland) Sandro Zeller	(Switzerland) Jo Zeller Racing	(Germany) Nicolas Löffler	(Czech Republic) Václav Šafář	(Austria) Alexander Fritz
7	R2	(Czech Republic) Brno Circuit	(Switzerland) Sandro Zeller	(Switzerland) Sandro Zeller	(Switzerland) Sandro Zeller	(Switzerland) Jo Zeller Racing	(Germany) André Petropoulos	(Czech Republic) Václav Šafář	(Austria) Alexander Fritz
8	SR	(Italy) Mugello Circuit		(Denmark) Stig Larsen	(Switzerland) Sandro Zeller	(Switzerland) Jo Zeller Racing	(Italy) Karim Sartori	(France) Arthur Lorimier	(France) Sarene Ziffel
8	FR	(Italy) Mugello Circuit	(Switzerland) Sandro Zeller	(Switzerland) Sandro Zeller	(Switzerland) Sandro Zeller	(Switzerland) Jo Zeller Racing	(Italy) Umberto Vaglio	(France) Arthur Lorimier	(France) Sarene Ziffel

== Season report ==
The 2026 season of the newly-renamed Austria Formula Cup began at the Red Bull Ring with Jo Zeller Racing's Sandro Zeller taking pole position for both races. The first race saw Zeller win ahead of Puresport driver Andrea Benalli, with Michael Fischer taking third for Red Rose Racing by LRT. Zeller doubled down in race two by taking another victory to end the weekend with a perfect score in the lead of the standings. Benalli came second again, 14 points behind Zeller in the championship, as Nannini Racing's Marco Falci claimed third. ADAC Südbayern e.V. driver Nicolas Löffler, Red Rose Racing's Norbert Lenzenweger and privateer entry Sarene Ziffel ended the round leading the different subclasses.

Round two at Imola saw Zeller take yet another pole position, but the first race began with Falci careering into him on the opening lap, eliminating both from the race. That left Benalli free to take victory ahead of Corbetta Racing's Riccardo Perego and Fischer. Zeller bounced back with a flawless performance throughout multiple safety car interruptions in race two. Benalli took second ahead of Fischer to end the weekend just a single point behind the Swiss in the overall standings. Löffler and Ziffel meanwhile both extended their lead in their respective subclasses, while pre-event Formula Regional leader Lenzenweger was absent, allowing Henry Morrogh's Matteo Zoccali to overtake him in their class.

The series returned to Automotodrom Grobnik for the first time in 25 years for round three. Fischer was the only one of the pre-event top ten drivers to attend the event. He dominated the weekend by taking victory in both races, first in wet conditions on Saturday and then once again in the dry on Sunday. He thereby claimed the championship lead by 17 as Team Hoffmann Racing's André Petropoulos took second twice to rise to fourth in the overall standings and claim the lead in the F3 Trophy class. The leaders in Formula Regional and Formula Light were both absent as Team Hoffmann's Karlheinz Matzinger and Kermor's Vida Benedek took double class wins on their first outings of the seasons.

The first half of the season concluded at Vallelunga Circuit. Zeller claimed yet another pole position, which placed him in eighth for the sprint race. He worked his way up the order, while a technical issue ended the race for his closest competitor Benalli. Zeller claimed the lead, with G Motorsport's Stig Larsen beating Franz Wöss Racing's Christof Ledermann to third place. The feature race proved way more straightforward for Zeller, as he was able to take an unchallenged victory to retake the points lead over the absent Fischer. Larsen claimed another second place, this time leading Facondini's Francesco Solfaroli, while Benalli lost further ground with a non-point finish as he was now 46 points behind Zeller.

The Monza Circuit hosted round five, and Zeller's qualifying dominance continued with another pole position. The sprint race began with two big crashes after cars stalled at the start, leading to medical intervention and a red flag. After the restart, Zeller, who had fallen to 17th during the start, performed a remarkable climb through the order to recover to third behind teammate Kurt Böhlen and eventual winner Perego. The feature race was held in wet conditions, but Zeller controlled the race from the start throug a mid-race safety car to take an unchallenged victory. Benalli claimed second to draw level with the absent Fischer in the standings 65 points behind Zeller, while Böhlen completed the podium.

Round six, held at the Slovakia Ring, brought no new face in qualifying as Zeller claimed two more pole positions. The opening race saw Zeller hold his lead and control proceedings as a fight for the other podium spots behind saw Magyar Racing Team's János Magyar hold on to second place as Löffler rose from fifth on the grid to take third. The second race brought Zeller's eighth victory of the season, which, coupled with neither Fischer nor Benalli competing, saw him amass an unassailable 115-point lead and claim his ninth championship title. Magyar took another podium in second place, while Ledermann rose up the grid, finishing in third to move into fourth place in the overall standings.

Two more pole positions for Zeller followed in the penultimate round, held at Brno Circuit. Zeller held his lead in race one, but Böhlen remained close on his tail all race. Still, Zeller remained faultless to notch up victory number nine of 2026. Third place went to Formula Regional competitor Václav Šafář, driving for Team Hoffmann Racing. Race two brought more controlled driving by Zeller, who was able to escape from the rest of the field this time and win by almost ten seconds. Šafář was able to better his result from the first race as he took second place, while Böhlen was relegated to third. Zeller now led the standings by 158 points, with Ledermann taking over runner-up spot from the absent Fischer.

The season finale at Mugello Circuit brought one final pole position for Zeller, his tenth of the year. He quickly moved up the order in the reversed-grid race to spend the latter parts of it attacking Perego. He made his move for the lead on the penultimate lap to take victory, with Franz Wöss Racing's Cian Carey taking third on the first race of his season. Zeller then doubled up in the feature race to end the championship with another double victory, taking twelve wins in total across the year. Böhlen took second, but could not pass Ledermann for second place in the overall standings, while Larsen completed the podium and Löffler finished tenth overall. thereby sealing the title in the F3 Trophy class.

== Standings ==
=== Scoring system ===
For the race weekends held in conjunction with the F2000 Italian Formula Trophy, the shorter, first race of each weekend was designated the Sprint Race, where classified drivers scored the following points:

Position	**1st**	**2nd**	**3rd**	**4th**	**5th**	**6th**	**7th**	**8th**	**9th**	**10th**
Points	20	15	12	10	8	6	4	3	2	1

The second race of each weekend, the longer Feature Race, awarded more points:

Position	**1st**	**2nd**	**3rd**	**4th**	**5th**	**6th**	**7th**	**8th**	**9th**	**10th**
Points	25	18	15	12	10	8	6	4	2	1

Points were awarded both in the overall classification and per class. If less than three cars entered in a class, half points were awarded for the race. In the opening round as well as the other rounds held without the F2000 Italian Formula Trophy, both races were designated as feature races and awarded full points.

=== Drivers' standings ===
==== Formula 3 Cup overall standings ====
Pos	Driver	RBR (Austria)		IMO (Italy)		GRO (Croatia)		VLL (Italy)		MNZ (Italy)		SVK (Slovakia)		BRN (Czech Republic)		MUG (Italy)		Pts
Pos	Driver	R1	R2	SR	FR	R1	R2	SR	FR	SR	FR	R1	R2	R1	R2	SR	FR	Pts
1	(Switzerland) Sandro Zeller	**1**	**1**	Ret	**1**			1	**1**	3	**1**	**1**	**1**	**1**	**1**	1	**1**	302
2	(Switzerland) Christof Ledermann	8	7	4	8			3	4	4	8	7	3	7	5	6	8	109
3	(Switzerland) Kurt Böhlen	4	4							2	3			2	3	10	2	106
4	(Denmark) Stig Larsen	6	5	Ret	6			2	2	Ret	5					4	3	94
5	(Austria) Michael Fischer	3	Ret	3	3	**1**	**1**											92
6	(Italy) Andrea Benalli	2	2	1	2			Ret	14	14	2							92
7	(Germany) André Petropoulos	13	12	5	Ret	2	2	5	Ret			8	5	5	4			88
8	(Germany) Nicolas Löffler	9	8	20	7	3	Ret			6	7	3	4	4	7	Ret	10	85
9	(Hungary) János Magyar	5	6							11	4	2	2	6	10			75
10	(Italy) Riccardo Perego			2	5					1	6					2	7	74
11	(Italy) Francesco Solfaroli							4	3	7	14					5	5	47
12	(United Kingdom) Lee Cunningham	11	15	8	10	4	DNS					5	7	9	9			36
13	(Czech Republic) Václav Šafář													3	2			33
14	(Italy) Marco Falci	25†	3	Ret	4			Ret	DNS									27
15	(Austria) Karlheinz Matzinger					5	3											25
16	(Austria) Nikolay Takev											4	Ret	8	6			24
17	(Hungary) Vida Benedek					6	5	10	9	19	15	WD	WD	WD	WD			21
18	(Italy) Laurence Balestrini	10	9	7	9			Ret	5	Ret	16							19
19	(France) Arthur Lorimier									Ret	9					7	4	18
20	(Austria) Ludwig Kronawitter					7	4											18
21	(Italy) Franco Cimarelli			10	20			6	6									15
22	(Republic of Ireland) Cian Carey															3	23	12
23	(Austria) Dr. Norbert Groer	17	Ret	Ret	19	8	7					11	9	14	11	17	17	12
24	(Italy) Luca Iannacone	23	21	22	Ret	9	6			18	25	12	11	15	15	18	19	10
25	(Hungary) Christopher Oslanec											9	6					10
26	(Italy) Valentino Carofano							8	7									9
27	(Italy) Fabio Turchetto									5	Ret							8
28	(Italy) Davide Pedetti			11	13			DNS	DNS							11	6	8
29	(Italy) Giovanni Giordano											6	Ret					8
30	(Hungary) Zeno Kovacs							7	12	Ret	10	WD	WD	WD	WD	8	11	8
31	(Italy) Karim Sartori	12	11	6	12					10	17					12	12	7
32	(Austria) Hannes Neuhauser	7	17															6
33	(Italy) Umberto Vaglio			19	Ret			11	10	8	11					13	9	6
34	(Austria) Alexander Fritz	19	18	13	15							10	8	11	14			5
35	(United States) Robert Siska					10	8			17	24							5
36	(Czech Republic) Tomáš Chabr													10	8			5
37	(Italy) Andrea Masci							Ret	8									4
38	(Italy) Enrico Milani			9	23			DNS	DNS									2
39	(Italy) Antonino Pellegrino							9	Ret									2
40	(Italy) Angelo Comi									9	19					21	14	2
41	(United States) Alex Lima															9	21	2
42	(Austria) Norbert Lenzenweger	14	10															1
43	(Czech Republic) Roman Roubíček											Ret	10	WD	WD			1
44	(Italy) Matteo Zoccali	22	20	15	17			13	11	Ret	23			13	13	19	18	0
45	(Switzerland) Urs Rüttimann			21	11					16	18							0
46	(Austria) Walter Stending			18	22									12	12			0
47	(France) Sarene Ziffel	16	13	12	14					15	20					16	16	0
48	(Italy) Sandro de Virgilis							12	13									0
49	(Italy) Mei Shibi									12	13							0
50	(Italy) Filippo Golin									21	12							0
51	(Switzerland) Walter Mani											Ret	12					0
52	(Austria) Markus Leidinger	24	22							13	Ret							0
53	(Italy) Giuseppe Marinaro									Ret	DNS					DNS	13	0
54	(Italy) Patrick Bellezza			14	18			DNS	DNS							14	15	0
55	(Austria) Stefan Eisinger-Sewald	18	14	16	16													0
56	(Italy) Sergio Terrini									22	21					15	Ret	0
57	(Italy) Romano Cataldo	15	Ret															0
58	(Austria) Jürgen Berger	20	16															0
59	(Italy) Giovanni Ciccarelli			17	21													0
60	(Austria) Marco Milani	21	19															0
61	(France) Bruno Mottez									20	22							0
62	(Italy) Armando Stola															20	22	0
63	(Italy) Stefano Noal									DNS	DNS					Ret	20	0
—	(Austria) Alexander Geier	DNS	Ret							DNS	DNS							0
—	(Italy) Riccardo Rossi			Ret	DNS													0
—	(Italy) Federico Porri							Ret	Ret									0
—	(Italy) Antonio Vessicchio							DNS	DNS									0
—	(Italy) Marco de Toffol							DNS	DNS									0
—	(Italy) Domenico Terron									Ret	DNS							0
Pos	Driver	R1	R2	SR	FR	R1	R2	SR	FR	SR	FR	R1	R2	R1	R2	SR	FR	Pts
Pos	Driver	RBR (Austria)		IMO (Italy)		GRO (Croatia)		VLL (Italy)		MNZ (Italy)		SVK (Slovakia)		BRN (Czech Republic)		MUG (Italy)		Pts

Colour	Result
Gold	Winner
Silver	Second place
Bronze	Third place
Green	Points classification
Blue	Non-points classification
Blue	Non-classified finish (NC)
Purple	Retired, not classified (Ret)
Red	Did not qualify (DNQ)
Red	Did not pre-qualify (DNPQ)
Black	Disqualified (DSQ)
White	Did not start (DNS)
White	Withdrew (WD)
White	Race cancelled (C)
Blank	Did not practice (DNP)
Blank	Did not arrive (DNA)
Blank	Excluded (EX)

**Bold** – Pole

Italics – Fastest Lap

† – Did not finish, but classified

==== Sub-class standings ====
Pos	Driver	RBR (Austria)		IMO (Italy)		GRO (Croatia)		VLL (Italy)		MNZ (Italy)		SVK (Slovakia)		BRN (Czech Republic)		MUG (Italy)		Pts
Pos	Driver	R1	R2	SR	FR	R1	R2	SR	FR	SR	FR	R1	R2	R1	R2	SR	FR	Pts
Formula 3 Trophy
1	(Germany) Nicolas Löffler	2	1	8	1	2	Ret			2	1	1	1	1	3	Ret	2	237
2	(Germany) André Petropoulos	5	3	1	Ret	1	1	1	Ret			5	2	2	1			186
3	(United Kingdom) Lee Cunningham	3	4	3	2	3	DNS					3	3	4	5			124
4	(Italy) Umberto Vaglio			7	Ret			2	1	4	2					2	1	112
5	(Italy) Karim Sartori	4	2	2	4					6	5					1	3	108
6	(Italy) Luca Iannacone	7	6	10	Ret	4	2			9	9	6	4	6	6	5	7	99
7	(Austria) Nikolay Takev											2	Ret	3	2			51
8	(Austria) Hannes Neuhauser	1	5															35
9	(Italy) Patrick Bellezza			6	6			DNS	DNS							3	6	34
10	(Italy) Angelo Comi									5	7					6	5	30
11	(Switzerland) Urs Rüttimann			9	3					8	6							28
12	(Italy) Francesco Solfaroli									3	4							24
13	(Czech Republic) Tomáš Chabr													5	4			22
14	(Italy) Fabio Turchetto									1	Ret							20
15	(Italy) Mei Shibi									7	3							19
16	(Italy) Davide Pedetti			5	5			DNS	DNS									18
17	(Italy) Enrico Milani			4	7			DNS	DNS									16
18	(Italy) Sergio Terrini									10	8					4	Ret	15
19	(Italy) Giovanni Giordano											4	Ret					12
20	(Italy) Giuseppe Marinaro									Ret	DNS					DNS	4	12
21	(Italy) Romano Cataldo	6	Ret															8
—	(Italy) Federico Porri							Ret	Ret									0
Formula Regional
1	(Italy) Matteo Zoccali	3	2	1	1			4	3	Ret	3			3	4	4	4	167
2	(Austria) Dr. Norbert Groer	2	Ret	Ret	2	2*	2*					1*	1*	4	2	3	3	136
3	(Hungary) Zeno Kovacs							1	4	Ret	2	WD	WD	WD	WD	2	2	83
4	(France) Arthur Lorimier									Ret	1					1	1	70
5	(Austria) Walter Stending			2	3									2	3			63
6	(Austria) Norbert Lenzenweger	1	1															50
7	(Czech Republic) Václav Šafář													1	1			50
8	(Austria) Markus Leidinger	4	3							1	Ret							47
9	(Italy) Valentino Carofano							2	1									40
10	(Austria) Karlheinz Matzinger					1*	1*											25
11	(Italy) Sandro de Virgilis							3	5									22
12	(Italy) Andrea Masci							Ret	2									18
Formula Light Cup
1	(France) Sarene Ziffel	1	1	1	1					1	2					1	1	178
2	(Austria) Alexander Fritz	3	4	2	2							2	2	1*	1*			121
3	(Hungary) Vida Benedek					1*	1*	1*	1*	3	1	WD	WD	WD	WD			84.5
4	(Austria) Stefan Eisinger-Sewald	2	2	3	3													63
5	(Hungary) Christopher Oslanec											1	1					50
6	(United States) Robert Siska					2*	2*			2	4							45
7	(Italy) Armando Stola															2	3	30
8	(Austria) Jürgen Berger	4	3															27
9	(France) Bruno Mottez									4	3							25
10	(Italy) Giovanni Ciccarelli			4	4													22
11	(Austria) Marco Milani	5	5															20
12	(Italy) Stefano Noal									DNS	DNS					Ret	2	18
13	(Czech Republic) Roman Roubíček											Ret	3	WD	WD			15
14	(Switzerland) Walter Mani											Ret	4					12
—	(Austria) Alexander Geier	DNS	Ret							DNS	DNS							0
—	(Italy) Riccardo Rossi			Ret	DNS													0
—	(Italy) Marco de Toffol							DNS	DNS									0
—	(Italy) Antonio Vessicchio							DNS	DNS									0
—	(Italy) Domenico Terron									Ret	DNS							0
Pos	Driver	R1	R2	SR	FR	R1	R2	SR	FR	SR	FR	R1	R2	R1	R2	SR	FR	Pts
Pos	Driver	RBR (Austria)		IMO (Italy)		GRO (Croatia)		VLL (Italy)		MNZ (Italy)		SVK (Slovakia)		BRN (Czech Republic)		MUG (Italy)		Pts

Colour	Result
Gold	Winner
Silver	Second place
Bronze	Third place
Green	Points classification
Blue	Non-points classification
Blue	Non-classified finish (NC)
Purple	Retired, not classified (Ret)
Red	Did not qualify (DNQ)
Red	Did not pre-qualify (DNPQ)
Black	Disqualified (DSQ)
White	Did not start (DNS)
White	Withdrew (WD)
White	Race cancelled (C)
Blank	Did not practice (DNP)
Blank	Did not arrive (DNA)
Blank	Excluded (EX)

**Bold** – Pole

Italics – Fastest Lap

† – Did not finish, but classified

* – half points awarded as less than three cars entered the race

=== Teams' standings ===
Pos	Team	Pts
1	(Switzerland) Jo Zeller Racing	408
2	(Austria) Franz Wöss Racing	228
3	(Germany) Team Hoffmann Racing	194
4	(Austria) Red Rose Racing by LRT	98
5	(Italy) Corbetta Racing	95
6	(Italy) Puresport	94
7	(Hungary) Magyar Racing Team	75
8	(Italy) G Motorsport	68
9	(Italy) One Competition	43
10	(Italy) Nannini Racing	35
11	(Hungary) Kermor Motorsport	29
12	(Germany) ADAC Südbayern e.V.	27
13	(Austria) APE Racing	24
14	(Italy) Giordano Motorsport	24
15	(Italy) Viola Formula Racing	18
16	(Italy) F. C. Racing	15
17	(Italy) Ruote Scoperte	12
18	(Hungary) Makolm Motorsport	10
19	(Italy) Valentino Racing Team	9
20	(Italy) Speed Motor	7
21	(Austria) Neuhauser Racing Team	6
22	(Italy) Facondini Racing	6
23	(Czech Republic) Chabr Motorsport	5
24	(Italy) Antonino Racing	2
25	(Czech Republic) JMT Racing	1
26	(Austria) Markus Leidinger	0
27	(Austria) Geier Racing	0
28	(France) Team Sarene Ziffel	0
29	(Italy) Henry Morrogh Drivers School	0
30	(Italy) Team Perodi	0
31	(Italy) Bellspeed	0
32	(Italy) Valdelsa Classic Motor Club	0
33	(Austria) MSC Rottenegg	0
34	(Italy) Derva Corse ASD	0
35	(Italy) Alpha Racing	0
36	(Italy) PLM Racing	0
37	(France) Team Thomas Clausi	0
38	(France) Sud Motorsport	0
39	(Italy) FG Motorsport	0
40	Racing in Italy	0
Pos	Team	Pts
