= 2022 Drexler-Automotive Formula 3 Cup =

Motor racing competition

The 2022 Drexler-Automotive Formula 3 Cup was the 41st Austria Formula 3 Cup season and the fourth Drexler-Automotive Formula 3 Cup season.

== Teams and drivers ==
All Cup cars were built before 2018, Trophy cars were built between 1990 and 2007, and Open class have more powerful engines.

Team	Chassis	Engine	No.	Driver	Class	Rounds
(Austria) Franz Wöss Racing	Dallara F309	Volkswagen	1	(Canada) David Richert	C	All
(Austria) Franz Wöss Racing	Dallara F308	Opel-Spiess	9	(Italy) Luca Iannaccone	C	1–5, 7–8
(Austria) Franz Wöss Racing	Dallara F308	Mercedes	12	(Switzerland) Thomas Amweg	C	6
(Austria) Franz Wöss Racing	Dallara F308	NEB Mugen	15	(Greece) Daniel Tapinos	C	1–2, 4, 8
(Austria) Franz Wöss Racing	Dallara F318	Mercedes	19	(Republic of Ireland) Cian Carey	O	2–3
(Switzerland) Jo Zeller Racing	Dallara F306	Mercedes	2	(Switzerland) Urs Rüttimann	T	4, 6
(Switzerland) Jo Zeller Racing	Dallara F308	Mercedes	3	(Switzerland) Marcel Tobler	C	3, 6
(Switzerland) Jo Zeller Racing	Dallara F308	Mercedes	11	(Switzerland) Kurt Böhlen	C	6, 8
(Switzerland) Jo Zeller Racing	Dallara F312	Mercedes	44	(Switzerland) Sandro Zeller	C	2–8
(Czech Republic) Chabr Motorsport	Dallara F308	Mugen	4	(Czech Republic) Thomas Chabr	C	3–4, 6–7
(Germany) Speed Center	Dallara F308	Mercedes	5	(Germany) Christian Zeller	C	6
(Germany) Speed Center	Dallara F317	Toyota	13	(Austria) Philipp Todtenhaupt	O	1, 6
(Germany) Speed Center	Dallara F308	Toyota	180	(France) Patrick Harmuth	C	6
(Germany) Speed Center	Dallara F314	Toyota	188	(Switzerland) Thomas Zeltner	O	6
(Czech Republic) SAPE-Motorsport s.r.o	Dallara	Toyota	6	(Czech Republic) Vaclav Laušmán	O	4, 6–7
(Italy) Facondini Racing	Dallara F308	Fiat	6	(Italy) Enrico Milani	C	3
(Italy) Facondini Racing	Dallara F308	Fiat	41	(Italy) Franco Cimarelli	O	2–3
(Italy) Puresport	Dallara 320	Mercedes	8	(Italy) Dino Rasero	O	4–5
(Italy) Puresport	Dallara F309	Mercedes	14	(Italy) Andrea Benalli	O	4–5
(Denmark) Vadum Racing	Tatuus F3 T-318	Renault	10	(Japan) Juju Noda	O	2, 4, 7
(Denmark) Vadum Racing	Tatuus N.T07	Honda	14	(Czech Republic) Vaclav Šafář	O	7
(Italy) ASD Living KC	Dallara F308	Toyota	12	(Italy) Umberto Vaglio	C	2–3
(Italy) G Force Racing	Dallara		12	(Italy) Guido Luchetti	C	8
(Hungary) Gender Racing Team	Dallara F313	Toyota	17	(Slovakia) Nikolas Szabo	O	4, 7
(Italy) Sud Motorsport	Dallara F311	Fiar	18	(France) Jean Luc Neri	C	2, 6
(Italy) Team Automobile Tricolore	Dallara F312	Volkswagen	20	(Denmark) Stig Larsen	C	4–5, 8
(Italy) Team Automobile Tricolore	Mygale F3	Fiat	39	(Italy) Edoardo Bonamoni	C	4–5, 8
(Italy) One Management	Dallara F312	Volkswagen	21	(Italy) Renato Papaleo	O	4
(Germany) Vogtland Racing Team	Dallara F308	Toyota	22	(Germany) Danny Luderer	C	6–8
(Czech Republic) Effective Racing Team	Dallara 320	Mercedes	27	(Czech Republic) Vladimir Netušil	O	7
Privateer	Dallara F308	Fiat	28	(Italy) Giorgio Berto	C	2, 5
(Italy) Nannini Racing	Dallara F317	Toyota	42	(Italy) Davide Pedetti	O	4–5
(Hungary) Magyar Racing Team	Tatuus N.T07	Honda	46	(Hungary) Janos Magyar	O	1–2, 4, 7
Privateer	Dallara F308	Fiat	46	(Italy) Riccardo Perego	O	3–5, 8
(Hungary) HAT Powertrain	Dallara F313	Volkswagen	51	(Italy) Bernardo Pellegrini	O	4–5, 8
(Czech Republic) HKC Academy Racing	Dallara F308	Fiat	57	(Czech Republic) Jan Matyas	C	4, 7
(Hungary) Solution Racing SE	Dallara F314	Toyota	63	(Hungary) Benjamin Berta	O	1–2
(Austria) Team Hoffmann Racing	Dallara F314	Toyota	63	(Hungary) Benjamin Berta	O	3–8
(Austria) Team Hoffmann Racing	Dallara F314	Toyota	64	(Austria) Benjamin Dam	O	7
Racing by Italy	Dallara F308	Volkswagen	75	(Israel) Mei Shibi	C	4, 8
Privateer	Dallara F308	Fiat	83	(Italy) Daniele Radrizzani	C	2–3, 5
Privateer	Dallara F308	Fiat	88	(Italy) Francesco Solfaroli	C	2, 5
(Serbia) ASU NV Racing	Dallara 320	Volkswagen	212	(Serbia) Paolo Brajnik	O	1, 4–5, 8
Privateer	Dallara F316	Volkswagen	999	(Hungary) Attila Penzes	O	1, 4

Icon	Class
C	Championship
T	Trophy
O	Open

== Race calendar and results ==
Series finale at Mugello was originally scheduled for 23 October, but later date was moved a week earlier.

R.	RN	Circuit	Date	Pole position	Fastest lap	Cup Winner	Winning team	Open Winner
1	1	(Hungary) Hungaroring, Mogyoród	9 April	(Hungary) Benjamin Berta	(Hungary) Benjamin Berta	(Greece) Daniel Tapinos	(Austria) Franz Wöss Racing	(Hungary) Benjamin Berta
1	2	(Hungary) Hungaroring, Mogyoród	10 April	(Serbia) Paolo Brajnik	(Hungary) Attila Penzes	(Canada) David Richert	(Austria) Franz Wöss Racing	(Hungary) Attila Penzes
2	1	(Italy) Autodromo Nazionale Monza, Monza	23 April	(Serbia) Paolo Brajnik (Note: Brajnik was competing in the F2000 Italian Formula Trophy which shared the track with this championship.)	(Serbia) Paolo Brajnik	(Switzerland) Sandro Zeller	(Switzerland) Jo Zeller Racing	(Republic of Ireland) Cian Carey (Note: Paolo Brajnik was winner, while he competed in the F2000 Italian Formula Trophy)
2	2	(Italy) Autodromo Nazionale Monza, Monza	24 April	(Serbia) Paolo Brajnik	(Serbia) Paolo Brajnik	(Switzerland) Sandro Zeller	(Switzerland) Jo Zeller Racing	(Republic of Ireland) Cian Carey
3	1	(Italy) Autodromo Enzo e Dino Ferrari, Imola	7 May	(Switzerland) Sandro Zeller	(Italy) Bernardo Pellegrini (Note: Pellegrini was competing in the F2000 Italian Formula Trophy which shared the track with this championship.)	(Switzerland) Sandro Zeller	(Switzerland) Jo Zeller Racing	(Serbia) Paolo Brajnik
3	2	(Italy) Autodromo Enzo e Dino Ferrari, Imola	8 May	(Switzerland) Sandro Zeller	(Italy) Bernardo Pellegrini	(Switzerland) Sandro Zeller	(Switzerland) Jo Zeller Racing	(Italy) Bernardo Pellegrini
4	1	(Austria) Red Bull Ring, Spielberg	4 June	(Switzerland) Sandro Zeller	(Serbia) Paolo Brajnik	(Switzerland) Sandro Zeller	(Switzerland) Jo Zeller Racing	(Serbia) Paolo Brajnik
4	2	(Austria) Red Bull Ring, Spielberg	5 June	(Italy) Bernardo Pellegrini	(Serbia) Paolo Brajnik	(Switzerland) Sandro Zeller	(Switzerland) Jo Zeller Racing	(Italy) Bernardo Pellegrini
5	1	(Italy) Autodromo Vallelunga, Vallelunga	2 July	(Serbia) Paolo Brajnik	(Switzerland) Sandro Zeller	(Switzerland) Sandro Zeller	(Switzerland) Jo Zeller Racing	(Serbia) Paolo Brajnik
5	2	(Italy) Autodromo Vallelunga, Vallelunga	3 July	TBD	(Serbia) Paolo Brajnik	(Switzerland) Sandro Zeller	(Switzerland) Jo Zeller Racing	(Serbia) Paolo Brajnik
6	1	(Germany) Hockenheimring, Hockenheim	30 July	(Hungary) Benjamin Berta	(Hungary) Benjamin Berta	(Switzerland) Sandro Zeller	(Switzerland) Jo Zeller Racing	(Hungary) Benjamin Berta
6	2	(Germany) Hockenheimring, Hockenheim	31 July	(Switzerland) Sandro Zeller	(Hungary) Benjamin Berta	(Switzerland) Sandro Zeller	(Switzerland) Jo Zeller Racing	(Hungary) Benjamin Berta
7	1	(Czech Republic) Brno Circuit, Brno	11 September	(Switzerland) Sandro Zeller	(Switzerland) Sandro Zeller	(Switzerland) Sandro Zeller	(Switzerland) Jo Zeller Racing	(Hungary) Benjamin Berta
7	2	(Czech Republic) Brno Circuit, Brno	12 September	(Hungary) Benjamin Berta	(Hungary) Benjamin Berta	(Switzerland) Sandro Zeller	(Switzerland) Jo Zeller Racing	(Hungary) Benjamin Berta
8	1	(Italy) Mugello Circuit, Scarperia e San Piero	15 October	(Serbia) Paolo Brajnik	(Serbia) Paolo Brajnik	(Switzerland) Sandro Zeller	(Switzerland) Jo Zeller Racing	(Serbia) Paolo Brajnik
8	2	(Italy) Mugello Circuit, Scarperia e San Piero	16 October	TBA	(Switzerland) Sandro Zeller	(Switzerland) Sandro Zeller	(Switzerland) Jo Zeller Racing	(Hungary) Benjamin Berta

== Championship standings ==
Position	1st	2nd	3rd	4th	5th	6th	7th	8th	9th	10th
Main	25	18	15	12	10	8	6	4	2	1

Half points were awarded if less than 5 competitors participated. Standings for all competitions are shown below.

=== Drexler-Automotive Formula 3 Cup ===
Pos	Driver	HUN (Hungary)		MON (Italy)		IMO (Italy)		RBR (Austria)		VAL (Italy)		HOC (Germany)		BRN (Czech Republic)		MUG (Italy)		Pts
1	(Switzerland) Sandro Zeller			1	1	1	1	1	1	1	1	1	1	1	1	1	1	350
2	(Canada) David Richert	2	1	2	2	3	2	2	2	2	3	3	4	2	2	3	3	252.5
3	(Czech Republic) Thomas Chabr					6	5	3	3			5	5	4	4			92
4	(Italy) Luca Iannaccone	3	2	6	5	DNS	7	7	8	6	6			5	6	9	11	84.5
5	(Italy) Francesco Solfaroli			4	6					3	2					4	4	77
6	(Switzerland) Kurt Böhlen											2	2			2	2	72
7	(Switzerland) Marcel Tobler					3	2					4	3					60
8	(Greece) Daniel Tapinos	1	3	Ret	3			4	Ret							6	Ret	55
9	(Italy) Eduardo Bonamoni							6	6	4	4					7	6	54
10	(Italy) Daniele Radrizzani			5	Ret	5	6			7	7					8	8	48
11	(Italy) Umberto Vaglio			3	4	4	Ret											39
12	(Czech Republic) Jan Matyas							7	WD					3	3			36
13	(Germany) Danny Luderer											8	WD	6	5	5	Ret	34
13	(Denmark) Stig Larsen							5	7	5	9					11	9	28
15	(Switzerland) Urs Rüttiman							NC	4			9	6					22
16	(Italy) Enrico Milani					7	4											18
17	(Italy) Giorgio Berto			7	Ret					9	5							18
18	(Israel) Mei Shini							Ret	5							12	7	16
19	(France) Patrick Harmuth											8	7					10
20	(France) Jean Luc Neri			Ret	Ret					8	8					10	10	10
21	(Italy) Guido Luchetti															Ret	5	10
22	(Germany) Christian Zeller											6	Ret					8
Pos	Driver	HUN (Hungary)		MON (Italy)		IMO (Italy)		RBR (Austria)		VAL (Italy)		HOC (Germany)		BRN (Czech Republic)		MUG (Italy)		Pts

Colour	Result
Gold	Winner
Silver	Second place
Bronze	Third place
Green	Points classification
Blue	Non-points classification
Blue	Non-classified finish (NC)
Purple	Retired, not classified (Ret)
Red	Did not qualify (DNQ)
Red	Did not pre-qualify (DNPQ)
Black	Disqualified (DSQ)
White	Did not start (DNS)
White	Withdrew (WD)
White	Race cancelled (C)
Blank	Did not practice (DNP)
Blank	Did not arrive (DNA)
Blank	Excluded (EX)

**Bold** – Pole
Italics – Fastest Lap

=== Drexler-Automotive Formula 3 Open ===
Pos	Driver	HUN (Hungary)		MON (Italy)		IMO (Italy)		RBR (Austria)		VAL (Italy)		HOC (Germany)		BRN (Czech Republic)		MUG (Italy)		Pts
1	(Hungary) Benjamin Berta	1	Ret	2	2	2	1	4	4	2	2	1	1	1	1	3	1	257.5
2	(Serbia) Paolo Brajnik	2	4					1	2	1	1					1	2	166
3	(Hungary) Janos Magyar	4	2	4	4			6	5					5	4			94
4	(Italy) Bernardo Pellegrini							10	1	4	3					2	3	86
5	(Republic of Ireland) Cian Carey			1	1	1	2											71.5
6	(Italy) Dino Rasero							2	3	3	4							60
7	(Italy) Riccardo Perego					3	Ret	9	Ret	5	6					4	4	51.5
8	(Japan) Juju Noda			5	5			5	7					7	7			48
9	(Italy) Andrea Benalli							7	8	7	7					5	5	42
10	(Hungary) Attila Penzes	3	1					WD	WD									40
11	(Austria) Philipp Todtenhaupt	5	3									4	4					37
12	(Slovakia) Nikolas Szabo							8	WD					2	3			37
13	(Italy) Franco Cimarelli			3	3	4	Ret											36
14	(Italy) Renato Papaleo							3	6	Ret	5							33
15	(Austria) Benjamin Dam													4	2			30
16	(Czech Republic) Vladimir Netušil													3	5			25
17	(Czech Republic) Vaclav Laušmán							12	10			2	2	8	NC			23
18	(Czech Republic) Vaclav Šafář													6	6			16
19	(Switzerland) Thomas Zeltner											3	3					15
20	(Italy) Davide Pedetti							11	9	6	Ret							10
Pos	Driver	HUN (Hungary)		MON (Italy)		IMO (Italy)		RBR (Austria)		VAL (Italy)		HOC (Germany)		BRN (Czech Republic)		MUG (Italy)		Pts
