= 2026 F2000 Italian Formula Trophy =

Motor racing championship

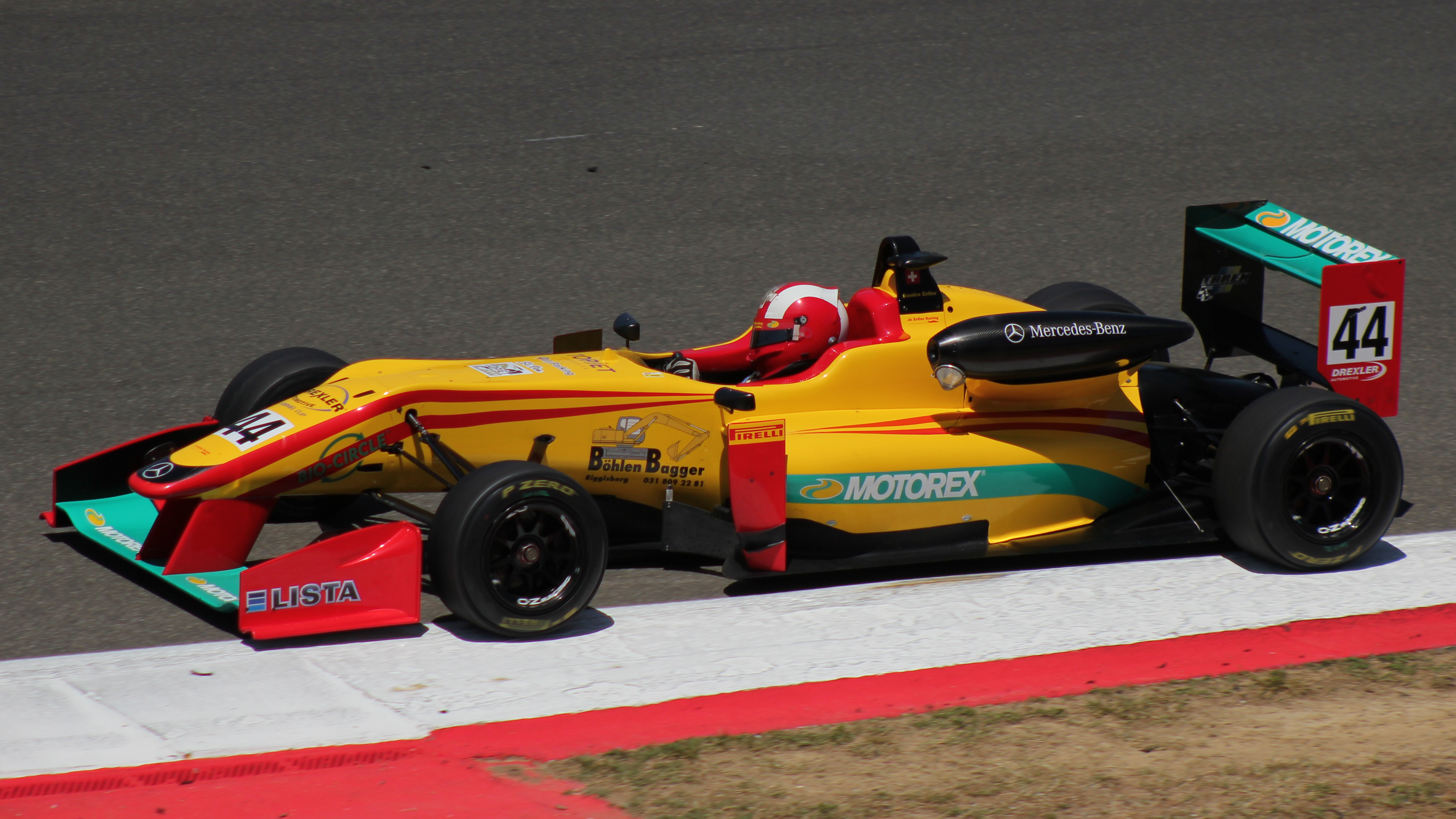
Sandro Zeller (pictured in 2025) won the Drivers' Championship after winning twelve races driving for Jo Zeller Racing, who won the Teams' Championship.

The 2026 TopJet F2000 Italian Formula Trophy was a multi-event open-wheel single seater motor racing championship. This was the thirteenth season of the series, featuring a mix of professional and amateur drivers competing in different classes and using multiple kinds of Formula 3-, Formula Regional-. Formula Renault- and Formula 4-level machinery.

The championship continued its cooperation with the Austria Formula Cup, with the two series sharing grids and race slots on multiple race weekends.

Jo Zeller Racing driver Sandro Zeller defended his overall championship title with one race weekend to spare, and in doing so also won the class title in the Platinum Class and helped his team win the Teams' Championship. Stig Larsen won the Super Formula Class driving for G Motorsport, Henry Morrogh Drivers School's Matteo Zoccali won the Formula Regional Class, ADAC Südbayern driver Nicolas Löffler won the Gold Class, Speed Motor's Karim Sartori won the Silver Class title and privateer Sarene Ziffel was victorious in the Formula Entry Class.

== Teams and drivers ==
Teams and drivers were divided into six classes: the Super Formula Class was open to Dallara F320 and F326 cars, while the Platinum, Gold, Silver and Bronze Classes were open to other older F3 cars and the Formula Entry Class lastly was open to Formula 4 and Formula Renault cars. The F2.0 Cup and both its subclasses were stopped and the eligible cars placed in the Formula Entry Class.

Team	No.	Driver	Car	Engine	Rounds
Super Formula Class entries
(Austria) Franz Wöss Racing	12	(Switzerland) Christof Ledermann	Dallara F320	Mercedes HWA	1–3, 5, 7
(Austria) Franz Wöss Racing	12	(Germany) Ludwig Kronawitter	Dallara F320		4
(Austria) Franz Wöss Racing	19	(Republic of Ireland) Cian Carey	Dallara F320	Mercedes HWA	7
(Austria) Franz Wöss Racing	20	(Denmark) Stig Larsen	Dallara F320	Mercedes HWA	All
(Italy) Giordano Motorsport	21	(Italy) Umberto Vaglio	Dallara F313	Toyota	2–3, 5, 7
Formula Regional Class entries
(Italy) Viola Formula Racing	3	(France) Arthur Lorimier	Tatuus F3 T-326	Toyota	5–7
(Italy) Valentino Racing Team	4	(Italy) Valentino Carofano	Tatuus F3 T-318	Alfa Romeo	3
(Austria) Markus Leidinger	8	(Austria) Markus Leidinger	Tatuus F3 T-318		5
(Italy) Ruote Scoperte	30	(Italy) Andrea Masci	Tatuus F3 T-318	Renault	3
(Italy) Alpha Racing	32	(Italy) Sandro de Virgilis	Tatuus F3 T-318	Renault	3
(Italy) Henry Morrogh Drivers School	37	(Italy) Matteo Zoccali	Tatuus F3 T-318	Renault	1–5, 7
(Hungary) Kermor Motorsport	68	(Hungary) Zeno Kovacs	Tatuus F3 T-318	Renault	5, 7
(Austria) Red Rose Racing by LRT	101	(Austria) Norbert Lenzenweger	Tatuus F3 T-318	Renault	7
Platinum Class entries
(Italy) Corbetta Racing	2	(Italy) Laurence Balestrini	Dallara F314	Volkswagen	1–6
(Italy) Puresport	14	(Italy) Andrea Benalli	Dallara F317	Mercedes HWA	1–6
(Italy) Puresport	14	(United States) Alex Lima	Dallara F317	Volkswagen	7
(Italy) Nannini Racing	18	(Italy) Marco Falci	Dallara F317	Volkswagen	1–3
(Italy) Nannini Racing	42	(Italy) Davide Pedetti	Dallara F317	Volkswagen	7
(Italy) Perego Racing	46	(Italy) Riccardo Perego	Dallara F317	Volkswagen	1–2, 4–7
(Switzerland) Jo Zeller Racing	44	(Switzerland) Sandro Zeller	Dallara F312	Mercedes HWA	All
(Italy) GF Motorsport	49	(Italy) Filippo Golin	Dallara F317	Volkswagen	2, 4–7
Racing in Italy	88	(Italy) Mei Shibi	Dallara F308		5
(Italy) One Motorsport	88	(Italy) Francesco Solfaroli	Dallara F317	Volkswagen	3, 5–7
(Italy) Antonino Racing	777	(Italy) Antonino Pellegrino	Dallara F393	Toyota	3–4, 6–7
Gold Class entries
(Switzerland) Jo Zeller Racing	4	(Switzerland) Urs Rüttimann	Dallara F308	Volkswagen	2, 4–5
(Italy) Facondini Racing	6	(Italy) Enrico Milani	Dallara F308	FPT	2–4
(Italy) Corbetta Racing	13	(Italy) Sergio Terrini	Dallara F317	Toyota	5, 7
(Germany) Team Hoffmann Racing	22	(Germany) André Petropoulos	Dallara F316	Opel Spiess	1–3, 7
(France) Sud Motorsport	33	(Italy) Giuseppe Marinaro	Dallara F310	FPT	5, 7
(France) Sud Motorsport	66	(Italy) Salvatore Marinaro	Dallara F310	FPT	6–7
(Italy) F. C. Racing	41	(Italy) Franco Cimarelli	Dallara F312	Volkswagen	2–4
(Italy) Nannini Racing	42	(Italy) Davide Pedetti	Dallara F317	Toyota	2–3
(Germany) ADAC Südbayern e.V.	91	(Germany) Nicolas Löffler	Dallara F312	Mercedes HWA	1–2, 5, 7
(Italy) Team Perodi	92	(Italy) Romano Cataldo	Dallara F316	Toyota	1
Silver Class entries
(Italy) Speed Motor	7	(Italy) Karim Sartori	Dallara F308	Toyota	1–2, 4–5, 7
(Italy) Giordano Motorsport	10	(Italy) Luca Iannacone	Dallara F308	FPT	1–2, 5, 7
(Italy) Giordano Motorsport	21	(Italy) Umberto Vaglio	Dallara F313	Toyota	4
(Italy) One Motorsport	28	(Italy) Federico Porri	Dallara F308	FPT	3
(Italy) Bellspeed	27	(Italy) Patrick Bellezza	Dallara F300	Fiat	2–3, 6–7
(Italy) Corbetta Racing	51	(Italy) Angelo Fabrizio Comi	Mygale F3	FPT	2, 4–7
(Italy) CMS Racing	72	(Italy) Felice Palazzo	Dallara F308	FPT	6–7
(Italy) Ruote Scoperte	79	(Italy) Fabio Turchetto	Dallara F308		5–6
Formula Entry Class entries
(Italy) Henry Morrogh Drivers School	9	(Italy) Giovanni Ciccarelli	Tatuus F4 T-421	Abarth	2
(France) Sud Motorsport	9	(Italy) Armando Stola	Tatuus FR2.0	Renault	7
(Italy) PLM Racing	18	(Italy) Domenico Terron	Tatuus FR2.0	Renault	5
(France) Team Thomas Clausi	23	(France) Bruno Mottez	Tatuus FR2.0	Renault	5
(Italy) Derva Corse ASD	24	(Italy) Marco de Toffol	Tatuus FR2.0	Renault	3, 6
(Italy) Derva Corse ASD	95	(Italy) Stefano Noal	Tatuus FR2.0	Renault	7
(France) Team Sarene Ziffel	31	(France) Sarene Ziffel	Tatuus FR2.0	Renault	1–2, 4–5, 7
(Italy) Ruote Scoperte	34	(Italy) Sergio Conti	Tatuus F4 T-421	Abarth	6–7
(Italy) Vessicchio Corse	50	(Italy) Antonio Vessicchio	Tatuus Formula Azzurra	Fiat	3
(Italy) Valdelsa Classic Motor Club	59	(Italy) Riccardo Rossi	Tatuus FR2.0	Renault	2
(Hungary) Kermor Motorsport	114	(Hungary) Vida Benedek	Tatuus FR2.0	Renault	5, 7
(Austria) Franz Wöss Racing	125	(United States) Robert Siska	Tatuus FR2.0	Renault	5
(Austria) Red Rose Racing by LRT	175	(Austria) Alexander Fritz	Tatuus FR2.0	Renault	2, 7
(Austria) Red Rose Racing by LRT	181	(Austria) Stefan Eisinger-Sewald	Tatuus FR2.0	Renault	2, 7
(Switzerland) Jo Zeller Racing	717	(Switzerland) Walter Mani	Tatuus FR2.0	Renault	4

== Race calendar ==
The 2026 calendar was announced in late 2025. The Red Bull Ring returned after a one-year absence, while the Brno Circuit was absent from the schedule after debuting in 2025. The championship originally was to debut at Circuito Tazio Nuvolari, before the calendar was amended, removing that round and adding a second round at Misano World Circuit instead.

Round		Circuit	Date	Support bill	Map of circuit locations
1	SR	(Austria) Red Bull Ring, Spielberg	11 April	Formula 4 CEZ Championship; GT Cup Series	2026 F2000 Italian Formula Trophy is located in Italy
1	FR	(Austria) Red Bull Ring, Spielberg	12 April	Formula 4 CEZ Championship; GT Cup Series	2026 F2000 Italian Formula Trophy is located in Italy
2	SR	(Italy) Imola Circuit, Imola	25 April	Italian GT Championship Sprint Cup; TCR Italy Touring Car Championship	2026 F2000 Italian Formula Trophy is located in Italy
2	FR	(Italy) Imola Circuit, Imola	26 April	Italian GT Championship Sprint Cup; TCR Italy Touring Car Championship	2026 F2000 Italian Formula Trophy is located in Italy
3	SR	(Italy) Vallelunga Circuit, Campagnano di Roma	4 July	Porsche Carrera Cup Italia; GT4 Italian Series	2026 F2000 Italian Formula Trophy is located in Italy
3	FR	(Italy) Vallelunga Circuit, Campagnano di Roma	5 July	Porsche Carrera Cup Italia; GT4 Italian Series	2026 F2000 Italian Formula Trophy is located in Italy
4	SR	(Italy) Misano World Circuit, Misano Adriatico	18 July	GT World Challenge Europe Sprint Cup; GT4 European Series	2026 F2000 Italian Formula Trophy is located in Italy
4	FR	(Italy) Misano World Circuit, Misano Adriatico	19 July	GT World Challenge Europe Sprint Cup; GT4 European Series	2026 F2000 Italian Formula Trophy is located in Italy
5	SR	(Italy) Monza Circuit, Monza	1 August	Eurocup-3; Mitjet Italia Racing Series	2026 F2000 Italian Formula Trophy is located in Italy
5	FR	(Italy) Monza Circuit, Monza	2 August	Eurocup-3; Mitjet Italia Racing Series	2026 F2000 Italian Formula Trophy is located in Italy
6	SR	(Italy) Misano World Circuit, Misano Adriatico	19 September	Porsche Carrera Cup Italia; TCR Italy Touring Car Championship	2026 F2000 Italian Formula Trophy is located in Italy
6	FR	(Italy) Misano World Circuit, Misano Adriatico	20 September	Porsche Carrera Cup Italia; TCR Italy Touring Car Championship	2026 F2000 Italian Formula Trophy is located in Italy
7	SR	(Italy) Mugello Circuit, Scarperia e San Piero	17 October	Italian National GT Challenge; Mitjet Italia Racing Series	2026 F2000 Italian Formula Trophy is located in Italy
7	FR	(Italy) Mugello Circuit, Scarperia e San Piero	18 October	Italian National GT Challenge; Mitjet Italia Racing Series	2026 F2000 Italian Formula Trophy is located in Italy

== Race results ==
Round		Circuit	Pole position	Super Formula winner	Platinum winner	Formula Regional winner	Gold winner	Silver winner	Formula Entry winner
1	SR	(Austria) Red Bull Ring	(Switzerland) Sandro Zeller	(Denmark) Stig Larsen	(Switzerland) Sandro Zeller	(Italy) Matteo Zoccali	(Germany) Nicolas Löffler	(Italy) Karim Sartori	(France) Sarene Ziffel
1	FR	(Austria) Red Bull Ring	(Switzerland) Sandro Zeller	(Denmark) Stig Larsen	(Switzerland) Sandro Zeller	(Italy) Matteo Zoccali	(Germany) Nicolas Löffler	(Italy) Karim Sartori	(France) Sarene Ziffel
2	SR	(Italy) Imola Circuit		(Switzerland) Christof Ledermann	(Italy) Andrea Benalli	(Italy) Matteo Zoccali	(Germany) André Petropoulos	(Italy) Karim Sartori	(France) Sarene Ziffel
2	FR	(Italy) Imola Circuit	(Switzerland) Sandro Zeller	(Denmark) Stig Larsen	(Switzerland) Sandro Zeller	(Italy) Matteo Zoccali	(Germany) Nicolas Löffler	(Italy) Karim Sartori	(France) Sarene Ziffel
3	SR	(Italy) Vallelunga Circuit		(Denmark) Stig Larsen	(Switzerland) Sandro Zeller	(Italy) Valentino Carofano	(Germany) André Petropoulos	no finishers	no starters
3	FR	(Italy) Vallelunga Circuit	(Switzerland) Sandro Zeller	(Denmark) Stig Larsen	(Switzerland) Sandro Zeller	(Italy) Valentino Carofano	(Italy) Franco Cimarelli	no finishers	no starters
4	SR	(Italy) Misano World Circuit		(Denmark) Stig Larsen	(Switzerland) Sandro Zeller	(Italy) Matteo Zoccali	(Italy) Franco Cimarelli	(Italy) Angelo Fabrizio Comi	(Switzerland) Walter Mani
4	FR	(Italy) Misano World Circuit	(Switzerland) Sandro Zeller	(Denmark) Stig Larsen	(Switzerland) Sandro Zeller	(Italy) Matteo Zoccali	(Italy) Franco Cimarelli	(Italy) Karim Sartori	(France) Sarene Ziffel
5	SR	(Italy) Monza Circuit		(Switzerland) Christof Ledermann	(Italy) Riccardo Perego	(Austria) Markus Leidinger	(Germany) Nicolas Löffler	(Italy) Fabio Turchetto	(France) Sarene Ziffel
5	FR	(Italy) Monza Circuit	(Switzerland) Sandro Zeller	(Denmark) Stig Larsen	(Switzerland) Sandro Zeller	(France) Arthur Lorimier	(Germany) Nicolas Löffler	(Italy) Karim Sartori	(Hungary) Vida Benedek
6	SR	(Italy) Misano World Circuit		(Denmark) Stig Larsen	(Switzerland) Sandro Zeller	(France) Arthur Lorimier	no entrants	(Italy) Patrick Bellezza	no entrants
6	FR	(Italy) Misano World Circuit	(Switzerland) Sandro Zeller	(Denmark) Stig Larsen	(Switzerland) Sandro Zeller	(France) Arthur Lorimier	no entrants	(Italy) Patrick Bellezza	no entrants
7	SR	(Italy) Mugello Circuit		(Republic of Ireland) Cian Carey	(Switzerland) Sandro Zeller	(France) Arthur Lorimier	(Italy) Sergio Terrini	(Italy) Karim Sartori	(France) Sarene Ziffel
7	FR	(Italy) Mugello Circuit	(Switzerland) Sandro Zeller	(Denmark) Stig Larsen	(Switzerland) Sandro Zeller	(France) Arthur Lorimier	(Germany) Nicolas Löffler	(Italy) Karim Sartori	(France) Sarene Ziffel

== Season report ==
14 cars entered the opening round of the 2026 season, held at the Red Bull Ring, and Jo Zeller Racing's Sandro Zeller led Puresport's Andrea Benalli in qualifying to take pole position. Benalli got the better start to the sprint race and passed the Swiss. The pair traded positions until Zeller solidified his lead, after which he built a gap and controlled the rest of the race. Benalli took second, with Franz Wöss Racing's Stig Larsen completing the podium. The feature race brought no challenges to Zeller's lead, with Benalli this time slotting in to second place right away, where he remained until the finish. Third went to Nannini Racing's Marco Falci, who recovered after a gearbox issue during race one.

Zeller continued his unbeaten run in qualifying for round two at Imola Circuit by claiming another pole position. However, that run would come to an end in the sprint race as Zeller was caught up in a collision that also eliminated Larsen and Falci. Benalli, now largely without competition, therefore claimed victory ahead of Perego Racing's Riccardo Perego and Franz Wöss Racing's Christof Ledermann. Zeller bounced back in the feature race by managing the race throughout two safety car phases and returning to the top step of the podium, while Benalli took second to hold on to a narrow overall championship lead and Falci took third despite a penalty following the incident in the sprint race.

Round three at Vallelunga Circuit saw yet another pole position in qualifying for Zeller. The sprint race began with misfortune for his rivals: Benalli and Falci collided and both ended up in the gravel, before further incidents for Ruote Scoperte's Andrea Masci and Corbetta's Laurence Balestrini saw Zeller able to take first place and lead Larsen and Ledermann to victory. The feature race was a more straightforward affair, as Zeller converted his pole position into an unthreatened victory, with Larsen second once again and Francesco Solfaroli third in his first weekend for his new One Competition team. With Benalli not scoring in either race, Zeller was able to greatly expand his championship lead.

The fourth weekend at Misano World Circuit brought the fourth feature race pole position for Zeller. That placed him eighth for the sprint race, but it took him just one lap to move into the lead. He managed the race throughout a safety car period and claimed his sixth victory of the season, ahead of Benalli and Perego. The feature race then saw the Swiss continue his dominance as he converted his pole position into yet another unchallenged victory, the fifth in a row in his campaign. Benalli took second again, but lost further ground in the championship as he fell to 64 points behind the Swiss. Larsen completed the podium to solidify his third place in the standings, a further 18 points in the rear.

The Monza Circuit hosted round five, where Zeller claimed pole position once again. The sprint race began with a multi-car crash and a red flag, before Zeller's recovery from his reverse-grid starting position was further halted by two safety car interruptions. He was in second when the race ended under yellow, handing victory to Perego as Ledermann took third. A heavy rain shower ahead of the feature race meant it started behind the safety car, but polesitter Zeller controlled proceedings and led every lap on his way to the win. Benalli took second after a race-long battle with Perego, bouncing back from a non-score in the sprint race but still finishing the weekend 68 points behind Zeller.

Zeller continued his pole position streak into round six as the series returned to Misano. His race pace was also far ahead of the field as he quickly rose up the order from eighth in the sprint race. By lap three, Zeller had taken the lead and began building a gap that grew to over eleven seconds at the chequered flag. Benalli, who led before Zeller overtook him, finished second ahead of Larsen. Zeller doubled up in the feature race to claim his tenth victory of 2026, also sealing the overall championship title in the process. Behind him, a fight for second place between Benalli and Perego ended in a collision, handing the place to Larsen and the final podium spot to Viola Formula's Arthur Lorimier.

The final round at Mugello Circuit saw Zeller complete a perfect qualifying sweep of the season with another pole position. The Sprint race began with a multi-car collision and a lengthy safety car. Zeller restarted the race in third before passing Franz Wöss Racing's Cian Carey and setting after leader Perego. The pair fought for multiple laps, before Zeller finally got past and took victory. Starting from pole position in the Feature Race meant Zeller was free to move into the lead straight away. He led Larsen, who claimed the runner-up spot in the championship, and Lorimier, ending his season with an unchallenged lights-to-flag victory and a final lead of 87 points in the championship standings.

== Standings ==
=== Scoring system ===
Drivers scored points in the overall standings, as well as in separate standings per class. Five points were awarded to each driver attending an event. Claiming the fastest lap per race per class awarded a point if at least three cars took part in that class.

The shorter first race of each weekend, designated as the Sprint Race, saw finishing drivers score the following points:

Position	1st	2nd	3rd	4th	5th	6th	7th	8th	9th	10th
Points	20	16	13	11	9	7	5	3	2	1

The second race of each weekend, called the Feature Race, awarded more points:

Position	1st	2nd	3rd	4th	5th	6th	7th	8th	9th	10th
Points	30	23	18	14	11	9	7	5	3	1

The final score was formed by counting each drivers' five best sprint race scores, six best feature race scores as well as the attendance points and fastest lap points for all race weekends.

=== Drivers' standings ===
==== Overall standings ====
Pos	Driver	RBR (Austria)		IMO (Italy)		VLL (Italy)		MIS1 (Italy)		MNZ (Italy)		MIS2 (Italy)		MUG (Italy)		Pts
Pos	Driver	SR	FR	SR	FR	SR	FR	SR	FR	SR	FR	SR	FR	SR	FR	Pts
1	(Switzerland) Sandro Zeller	**1**	(**1**)	(Ret)	**1**	1	**1**	1	**1**	(2)	**1**	1	**1**	1	**1**	304
2	(Denmark) Stig Larsen	3	4	(Ret)	(5)	2	2	5	3	(Ret)	4	3	2	4	2	217
3	(Italy) Andrea Benalli	2	2	1	2	(Ret)	12	2	2	12	2	2	8			196
4	(Italy) Riccardo Perego	(WD)	WD	2	4			3	Ret	1	3	4	6	2	6	148
5	(Switzerland) Christof Ledermann	4	5	3	7	3	4			3	6			6	7	130
6	(Italy) Francesco Solfaroli					4	3			6	12	11	7	5	4	86
7	(Italy) Laurence Balestrini	6	7	6	8	(Ret)	5	Ret	8	Ret	14	10	9			76
8	(France) Arthur Lorimier									Ret	7	5	3	7	3	72
9	(Italy) Antonino Pellegrino					8	Ret	4	4			6	4	WD	WD	70
10	(Germany) Nicolas Löffler	5	6	17	6					5	5			Ret	9	70
11	(Italy) Karim Sartori	7	8	5	10			10	9	9	15			11	11	56
12	(Italy) Marco Falci	13	3	Ret	3	Ret	DNS									51
13	(Italy) Franco Cimarelli			8	17	6	6	6	6							48
14	(Italy) Umberto Vaglio			16	Ret	9	9	12	DNS	7	9			12	8	43
15	(Germany) André Petropoulos	8	9	4	Ret	5	Ret							WD	WD	39
16	(Italy) Filippo Golin			DNS	DNS			Ret	Ret	19	10	7	5	WD	WD	37
17	(Italy) Angelo Fabrizio Comi			DNS	DNS			9	10	8	17	Ret	Ret	19	13	31
18	(Italy) Matteo Zoccali	11	11	13	15	11	10	13	12	(Ret)	21			17	16	31
19	(Italy) Davide Pedetti			9	11	DNS	DNS							10	5	29
20	(Switzerland) Urs Rüttimann			18	9			8	7	14	16					28
21	(France) Sarene Ziffel	10	10	10	12			Ret	11	13	18			15	15	28
22	(Italy) Fabio Turchetto									4	Ret	9	11			23
23	(Germany) Ludwig Kronawitter							7	5							21
24	(Italy) Enrico Milani			7	19	DNS	DNS	11	DNS							20
25	(Italy) Luca Iannacone	12	11	19	Ret					16	23			16	17	20
26	(Hungary) Zeno Kovacs									Ret	8			8	10	19
27	(Italy) Patrick Bellezza			12	16	WD	WD					8	10	13	14	19
28	(Republic of Ireland) Cian Carey													3	21	18
29	(Italy) Valentino Carofano					7	7									15
30	(Italy) Andrea Masci					Ret	8									10
31	(Italy) Giuseppe Marinaro									Ret	DNS			DNS	12	10
32	(Italy) Sergio Terrini									20	19			14	Ret	10
33	(United States) Alex Lima													9	19	7
34	(Italy) Romano Cataldo	9	Ret													7
35	(Italy) Sandro de Virgilis					10	11									6
36	(Italy) Mei Shibi									10	11					6
37	(Austria) Alexander Fritz			11	13									WD	WD	5
38	(Austria) Markus Leidinger									11	Ret					5
39	(Austria) Stefan Eisinger-Sewald			14	14									WD	WD	5
40	(Switzerland) Walter Mani							14	13							5
41	(Hungary) Vida Benedek									17	13			WD	WD	5
42	(Italy) Giovanni Ciccarelli			15	18											5
43	(United States) Robert Siska									15	22					5
44	(France) Bruno Mottez									18	20					5
45	(Italy) Armando Stola													18	20	5
46	(Italy) Stefano Noal													Ret	18	5
47	(Italy) Riccardo Rossi			Ret	DNS											5
48	(Italy) Federico Porri					Ret	Ret									5
49	(Italy) Domenico Terron									Ret	DNS					5
—	(Italy) Marco de Toffol					WD	WD					WD	WD			0
—	(Italy) Antonio Vessicchio					WD	WD									0
—	(Italy) Salvatore Marinaro											WD	WD	WD	WD	0
—	(Italy) Felice Palazzo											WD	WD	WD	WD	0
—	(Italy) Sergio Conti											WD	WD	WD	WD	0
—	(Austria) Norbert Lenzenweger													WD	WD	0
Pos	Driver	SR	FR	SR	FR	SR	FR	SR	FR	SR	FR	SR	FR	SR	FR	Pts
Pos	Driver	RBR (Austria)		IMO (Italy)		VLL (Italy)		MIS1 (Italy)		MNZ (Italy)		MIS2 (Italy)		MUG (Italy)		Pts

Key
Colour	Result
Gold	Winner
Silver	Second place
Bronze	Third place
Green	Other points position
Blue	Other classified position
Blue	Not classified, finished (NC)
Purple	Not classified, retired (Ret)
Red	Did not qualify (DNQ)
Red	Did not pre-qualify (DNPQ)
Black	Disqualified (DSQ)
White	Did not start (DNS)
White	Race cancelled (C)
Blank	Did not practice (DNP)
Blank	Excluded (EX)
Blank	Did not arrive (DNA)
Blank	Withdrawn (WD)
Blank	Did not enter (cell empty)
Text formatting	Meaning
**Bold**	Pole position
Italics	Fastest lap

==== F2000 standings per class ====
Pos	Driver	RBR (Austria)		IMO (Italy)		VLL (Italy)		MIS1 (Italy)		MNZ (Italy)		MIS2 (Italy)		MUG (Italy)		Pts
Pos	Driver	SR	FR	SR	FR	SR	FR	SR	FR	SR	FR	SR	FR	SR	FR	Pts
Super Formula Class
1	(Denmark) Stig Larsen	1	1	(Ret)	1	1	1	1	1	(Ret)	1	1	1	2	(1)	316
2	(Switzerland) Christof Ledermann	2	2	1	2	2	2			1	2			3	2	227
3	(Italy) Umberto Vaglio			2	Ret	3	3			2	3			4	3	130
4	(Germany) Ludwig Kronawitter							2	2							44
5	(Republic of Ireland) Cian Carey													1	4	40
Platinum Class
1	(Switzerland) Sandro Zeller	1	(1)	(Ret)	1	1	1	1	1	(2)	1	1	1	1	1	326
2	(Italy) Andrea Benalli	2	2	1	2	(Ret)	4	2	2	5	2	2	6			223
3	(Italy) Riccardo Perego	(WD)	WD	2	4			3	DNS	1	3	3	4	2	4	164
4	(Italy) Laurence Balestrini	3	4	3	5	(Ret)	3	Ret	4	Ret	7	6	7			134
5	(Italy) Francesco Solfaroli					2	2			3	6	7	5	3	2	133
6	(Italy) Antonino Pellegrino					3	Ret	4	3			4	2	WD	WD	91
7	(Italy) Filippo Golin			DNS	DNS			Ret	Ret	6	4	5	3	WD	WD	68
8	(Italy) Marco Falci	4	3	Ret	3	Ret	DNS									62
9	(Italy) Davide Pedetti													5	3	32
10	(Italy) Mei Shibi									4	5					27
11	(United States) Alex Lima													4	5	27
Formula Regional Class
1	(Italy) Matteo Zoccali	1	1	1	1	3	3	1	1	(Ret)	3			3	3	260
2	(France) Arthur Lorimier									Ret	1	1	1	1	1	148
3	(Hungary) Zeno Kovacs									Ret	2			2	2	72
4	(Italy) Valentino Carofano					1	1									57
5	(Italy) Sandro de Virgilis					2	4									35
6	(Italy) Andrea Masci					Ret	2									28
7	(Austria) Markus Leidinger									1	Ret					26
—	(Austria) Norbert Lenzenweger													WD	WD	0
Gold Class
1	(Germany) Nicolas Löffler	1	1	5	1					1	1			Ret	1	194
2	(Italy) Franco Cimarelli			3	4	2	1	1	1							139
3	(Switzerland) Urs Rüttimann			6	2			2	2	2	2					123
4	(Germany) André Petropoulos	2	2	1	Ret	1	Ret							WD	WD	95
5	(Italy) Sergio Terrini									3	3			1	Ret	61
6	(Italy) Enrico Milani			2	5	DNS	DNS	3	DNS							55
7	(Italy) Davide Pedetti			4	3	DNS	DNS									39
8	(Italy) Giuseppe Marinaro									Ret	Ret			DNS	2	33
9	(Italy) Romano Cataldo	3	Ret													18
—	(Italy) Salvatore Marinaro											WD	WD	WD	WD	0
Silver Class
1	(Italy) Karim Sartori	1	1	1	1			2	1	3	1			1	1	271
2	(Italy) Patrick Bellezza			2	2	DNS	DNS					1	1	2	3	144
3	(Italy) Angelo Fabrizio Comi			DNS	DNS			1	2	2	2	Ret	Ret	4	2	136
4	(Italy) Luca Iannacone	2	2	3	Ret					4	3			3	4	128
5	(Italy) Fabio Turchetto									1	Ret	2	2			70
6	(Italy) Umberto Vaglio							3	DNS							18
7	(Italy) Federico Porri					Ret	Ret									5
—	(Italy) Felice Palazzo											WD	WD	WD	WD	0
Formula Entry Class
1	(France) Sarene Ziffel	1	1	1	1			Ret	1	1	2			1	1	252
2	(Hungary) Vida Benedek									3	1			WD	WD	53
3	(Switzerland) Walter Mani							1	2							48
4	(Austria) Alexander Fritz			2	2									WD	WD	44
5	(Italy) Armando Stola													2	3	39
6	(Austria) Stefan Eisinger-Sewald			3	3									WD	WD	36
7	(France) Bruno Mottez									4	3					34
8	(United States) Robert Siska									2	4					32
9	(Italy) Giovanni Ciccarelli			4	4											30
10	(Italy) Stefano Noal													Ret	2	28
11	(Italy) Riccardo Rossi			Ret	DNS											5
12	(Italy) Domenico Terron									Ret	DNS					5
—	(Italy) Marco de Toffol					WD	WD					WD	WD			0
—	(Italy) Antonio Vessicchio					WD	WD									0
—	(Italy) Sergio Conti											WD	WD	WD	WD	0
Pos	Driver	SR	FR	SR	FR	SR	FR	SR	FR	SR	FR	SR	FR	SR	FR	Pts
Pos	Driver	RBR (Austria)		IMO (Italy)		VLL (Italy)		MIS1 (Italy)		MNZ (Italy)		MIS2 (Italy)		MUG (Italy)		Pts

=== Teams' standings ===
Each team counted the points of their two highest-finishing cars in each race.

Pos	Team	Pts
1	(Switzerland) Jo Zeller Racing	266
2	(Austria) Franz Wöss Racing	205
3	(Italy) Puresport	170
4	(Italy) Corbetta Racing	163
5	(Italy) G Motorsport	99
6	(Italy) Nannini Racing	63
7	(Italy) Speed Motor	51
8	(Italy) Giordano Motorsport	48
9	(Italy) F. C. Racing	48
10	(Italy) Antonino Racing	44
11	(Germany) Team Hoffmann Racing	39
12	(Italy) One Motorsport	39
13	(Italy) Facondini Racing	32
14	(Italy) Henry Morrogh Drivers School	31
15	(Italy) Ruote Scoperte	26
16	(France) Team Sarene Ziffel	23
17	(Italy) GF Motorsport	16
18	(Italy) Valentino Racing Team	15
19	(Hungary) Kermor Motorsport	15
20	(Italy) Viola Formula Racing	12
21	(Austria) Red Rose Racing by LRT	10
22	(Italy) Team Perodi	7
23	Racing in Italy	6
24	(Italy) Alpha Racing	6
25	(Italy) PLM Racing	5
26	(Italy) Valdelsa Classic Motor Club	5
27	(Italy) Bellspeed	5
28	(Italy) Derva Corse	5
29	(France) Sud Motorsport	5
30	(France) Team Thomas Clausi	5
31	(Austria) Markus Leidinger	5
Pos	Team	Pts
