= Dallara 320 =

Italian race car

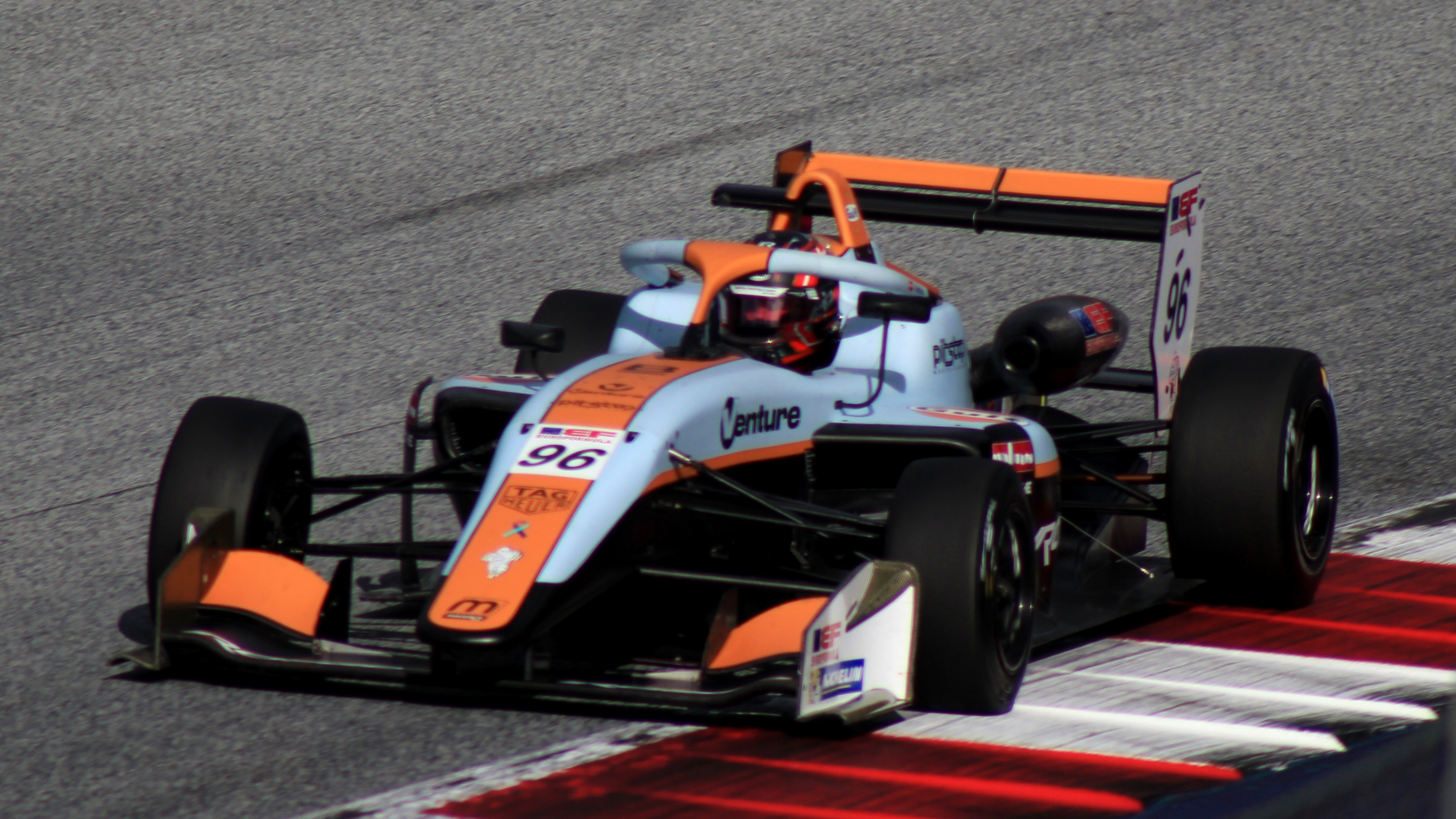
- Constructor: Dallara
- Designers: Luca Pignacca; Andrea Toso
- Predecessor: Dallara F317
- Successor: Dallara 324

Technical specifications
- Chassis: Carbon sandwich with AL honeycomb and additional protection panels
- Suspension (front): Push-rod with twin dampers, anti-roll bar and third element
- Suspension (rear): Push-rod with twin dampers, anti-roll bar and third element
- Length: 4,934 mm (194 in)
- Width: 1,875 mm (74 in) including tyres
- Height: 951 mm (37 in)
- Wheelbase: 2,866 mm (113 in)
- Engine: Various manufacturers 2.0 L (122 cu in) inline-4 engine naturally-aspirated, longitudinally mounted in a mid-engined, rear-wheel drive layout
- Transmission: 6-speed semi-automatic sequential gearbox
- Power: 240 hp (179 kW)
- Weight: 575 kg (1,268 lb) including driver
- Fuel: Various unleaded control fuel
- Lubricants: Various
- Brakes: Brembo Calipers and master cylinders – Brembo disc & pads
- Tyres: Various

Competition history
- Debut: 2020

The Dallara 320 is an open-wheel racing car developed by Italian manufacturer Dallara for use in the Euroformula Open Championship and Super Formula Lights. It was built as an upgraded version of the Dallara F317 chassis in which it replaces.
