= Dallara F3 cars =

Open-wheel formula racing cars built by Dallara

The Dallara F3 cars are open-wheel formula racing car, designed, developed and built by Italian manufacturer Dallara, for Formula Three categories.

== F397 ==
Dallara F397
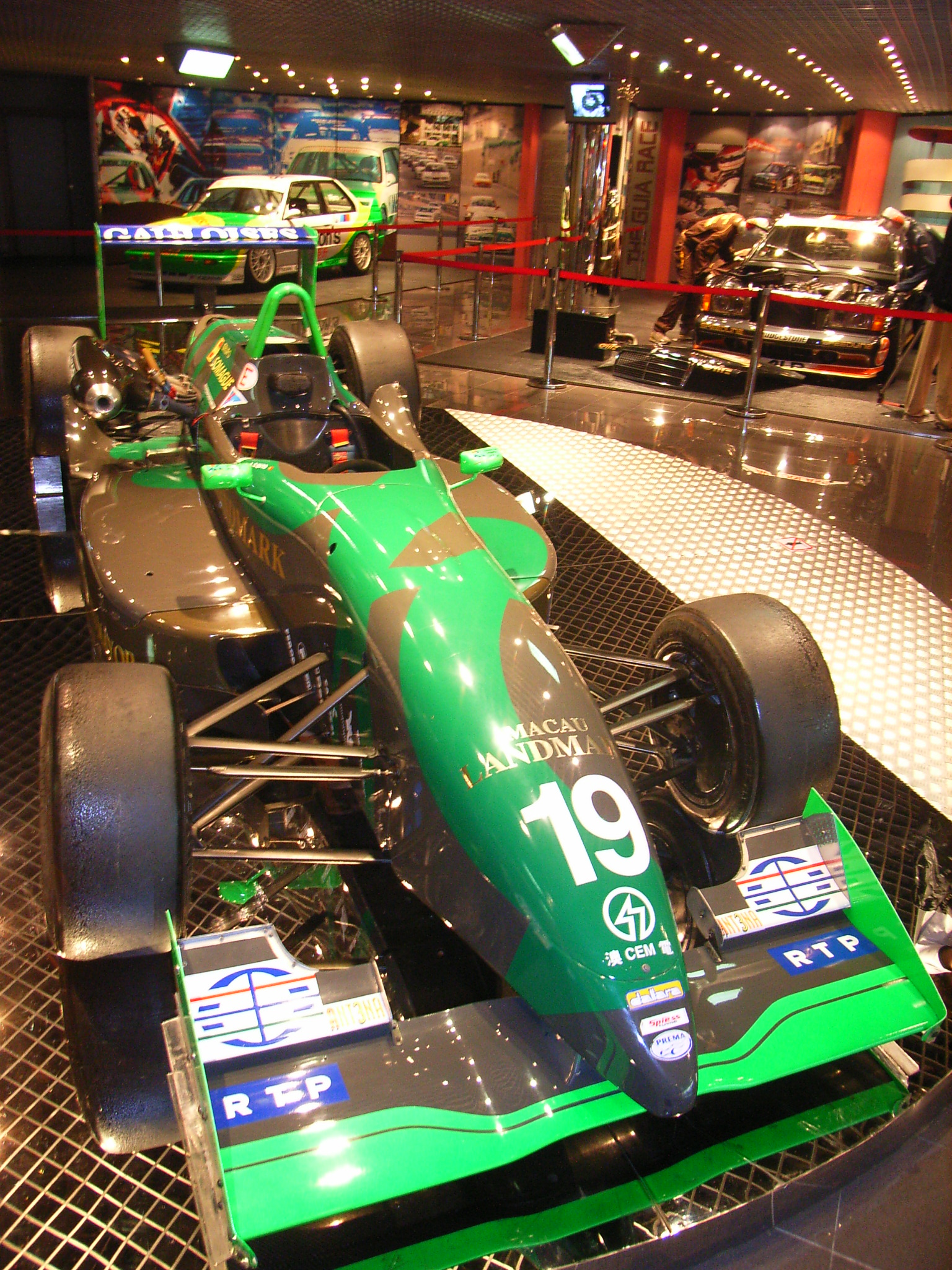
- Category: Formula Three
- Constructor: Dallara
- Predecessor: Dallara F396
- Successor: Dallara F398

Technical specifications
- Chassis: Carbon fibre and Kevlar composite honeycomb monocoque covered in glass fiber composite-nomex body
- Suspension (front): Pushrod with mono-damper system and torsion-bar springs
- Suspension (rear): Pushrod with mono-damper system and coils springs
- Length: 3,900 mm (154 in)
- Width: 1,750 mm (69 in) including tyres
- Height: 930 mm (37 in)
- Axle track: 1,500 mm (59 in) (front); 1,300 mm (51 in) (rear)
- Wheelbase: 2,611 mm (103 in)
- Engine: Various manufacturers: (Fiat Novamotor, Alfa Romeo, Honda-Mugen, Nissan Tomei, Opel-Spiess, Renault-Sodemo, Toyota-TOM'S), Mitsubishi-HKS 2.0 L (122 cu in) DOHC 16-valve inline-4 engine naturally-aspirated, longitudinally mounted in a mid-engined, rear-wheel drive layout
- Transmission: Hewland FTR-200/Dallara 5-speed + reverse manual
- Power: ~ 240 hp (179 kW)
- Weight: 530 kg (1,168 lb) including driver
- Fuel: Various unleaded control fuel
- Lubricants: Various
- Brakes: Brembo Carbon brake discs, 6-piston calipers and pads
- Tyres: Various

Competition history
- Debut: 1997

The Dallara F397 was designed in 1997.

== F398 ==
Dallara F398
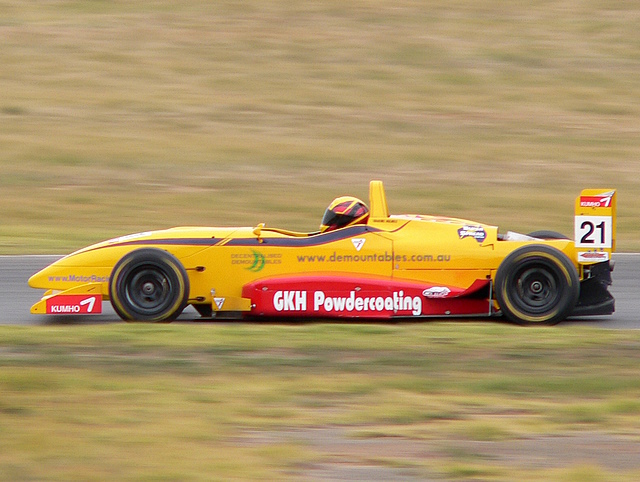
- Category: Formula Three
- Constructor: Dallara
- Predecessor: Dallara F397
- Successor: Dallara F399

Technical specifications
- Chassis: Carbon fibre and Kevlar composite honeycomb monocoque covered in glass fiber composite-nomex body
- Suspension (front): Pushrod with mono-damper system and torsion-bar springs
- Suspension (rear): Pushrod with mono-damper system and coils springs
- Length: 3,900 mm (154 in)
- Width: 1,750 mm (69 in) including tyres
- Height: 930 mm (37 in)
- Axle track: 1,500 mm (59 in) (front); 1,300 mm (51 in) (rear)
- Wheelbase: 2,611 mm (103 in)
- Engine: Various manufacturers: (Fiat Novamotor, Alfa Romeo, Honda-Mugen, Nissan Tomei, Opel-Spiess, Renault-Sodemo, Toyota-TOM'S), Mitsubishi-HKS 2.0 L (122 cu in) DOHC 16-valve inline-4 engine naturally-aspirated, longitudinally mounted in a mid-engined, rear-wheel drive layout
- Transmission: Hewland FTR-200/Dallara 5-speed + reverse manual
- Power: ~ 240 hp (179 kW)
- Weight: 530 kg (1,168 lb) including driver
- Fuel: Various unleaded control fuel
- Lubricants: Various
- Brakes: Brembo Carbon brake discs, 6-piston calipers and pads
- Tyres: Various

Competition history
- Debut: 1998

The Dallara F398 was designed in 1998.

== F302 ==
Dallara F302 Dallara F303 Dallara F304
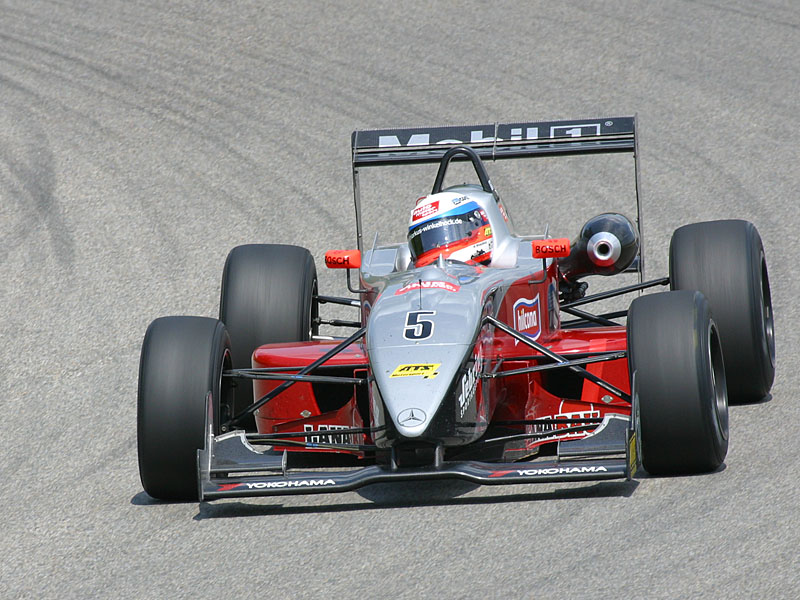
- Category: Formula Three
- Constructor: Dallara
- Predecessor: Dallara F399
- Successor: Dallara F305

Technical specifications
- Chassis: Carbon fibre and Kevlar composite honeycomb monocoque covered in glass fiber composite-nomex body
- Suspension (front): Pushrod with mono-damper system and torsion-bar springs
- Suspension (rear): Pushrod with mono-damper system and coils springs
- Length: 4,062 mm (160 in)
- Width: 1,770 mm (70 in) including tyres
- Height: 915 mm (36 in)
- Wheelbase: 2,675 mm (105 in)
- Engine: Various manufacturers (Fiat Novamotor, Ford Swindon, Honda-Mugen, Nissan Tomei, Opel-Spiess, Renault-Sodemo, Toyota-TOM'S) 2.0 L (122 cu in) DOHC inline-4 engine naturally-aspirated, longitudinally mounted in a mid-engined, rear-wheel drive layout
- Transmission: Hewland FTR-200 6-speed sequential gearbox
- Power: ~ 240 hp (179 kW)
- Weight: 550 kg (1,213 lb) including driver
- Fuel: Various unleaded control fuel
- Lubricants: Various
- Brakes: Brembo Carbon brake discs, 6-piston calipers and pads
- Tyres: Various

Competition history
- Debut: 2002

The Dallara F302 was designed in 2002. It became upgradable with aero kits, and its evolutions became known as the F303 and the F304, in 2003 and 2004, respectively.

== F305 ==
Dallara F305 Dallara F306 Dallara F307
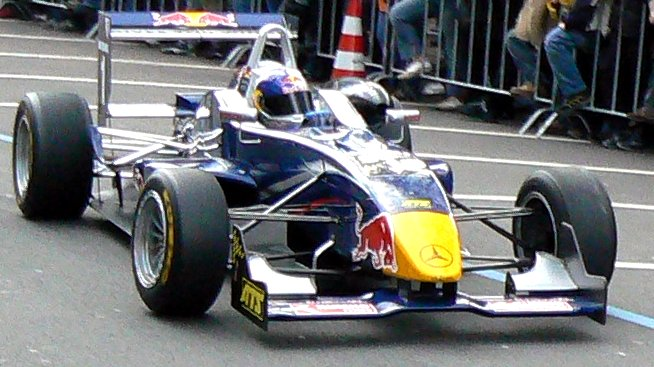
- Category: Formula Three
- Constructor: Dallara
- Predecessor: Dallara F304
- Successor: Dallara F308

Technical specifications
- Chassis: Carbon fibre and Kevlar composite honeycomb monocoque covered in glass fiber composite-nomex body
- Suspension (front): Pushrod with mono-damper system and torsion-bar springs
- Suspension (rear): Pushrod with mono-damper system and coils springs
- Length: 4,188 mm (165 in)
- Width: 1,825 mm (72 in) including tyres
- Height: 950 mm (37 in)
- Axle track: 1,580 mm (62 in) (front); 1,465 m (57,677 in) (rear)
- Wheelbase: 2,710 mm (107 in)
- Engine: Various manufacturers 2.0 L (122 cu in) DOHC inline-4 engine naturally-aspirated, longitudinally mounted in a mid-engined, rear-wheel drive layout
- Transmission: Hewland FTR-200 6-speed sequential gearbox
- Power: ~ 220–240 hp (164–179 kW)
- Weight: 550 kg (1,213 lb) including driver
- Fuel: Various unleaded control fuel
- Lubricants: Various
- Brakes: Brembo Carbon brake discs, 6-piston calipers and pads
- Tyres: Various

Competition history
- Debut: 2005

The Dallara F305 was built in 2005. It became upgradable with aero kits, and its evolutions became known as the F306 and the F307, in 2006 and 2007, respectively.

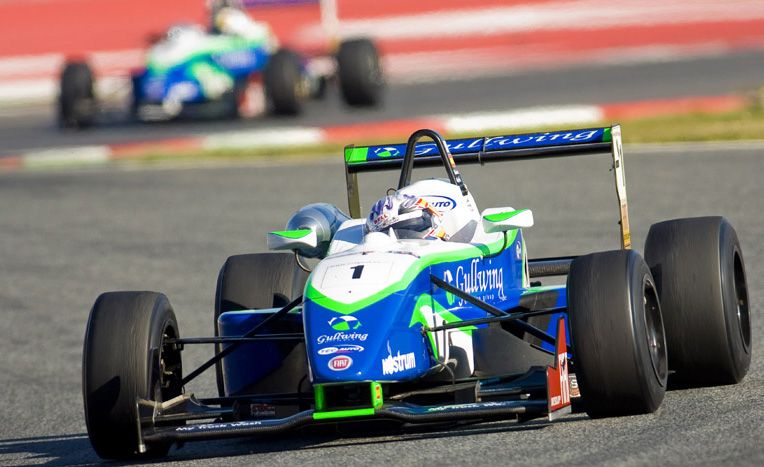
European F3 Dallara F306 chassis in 2007.

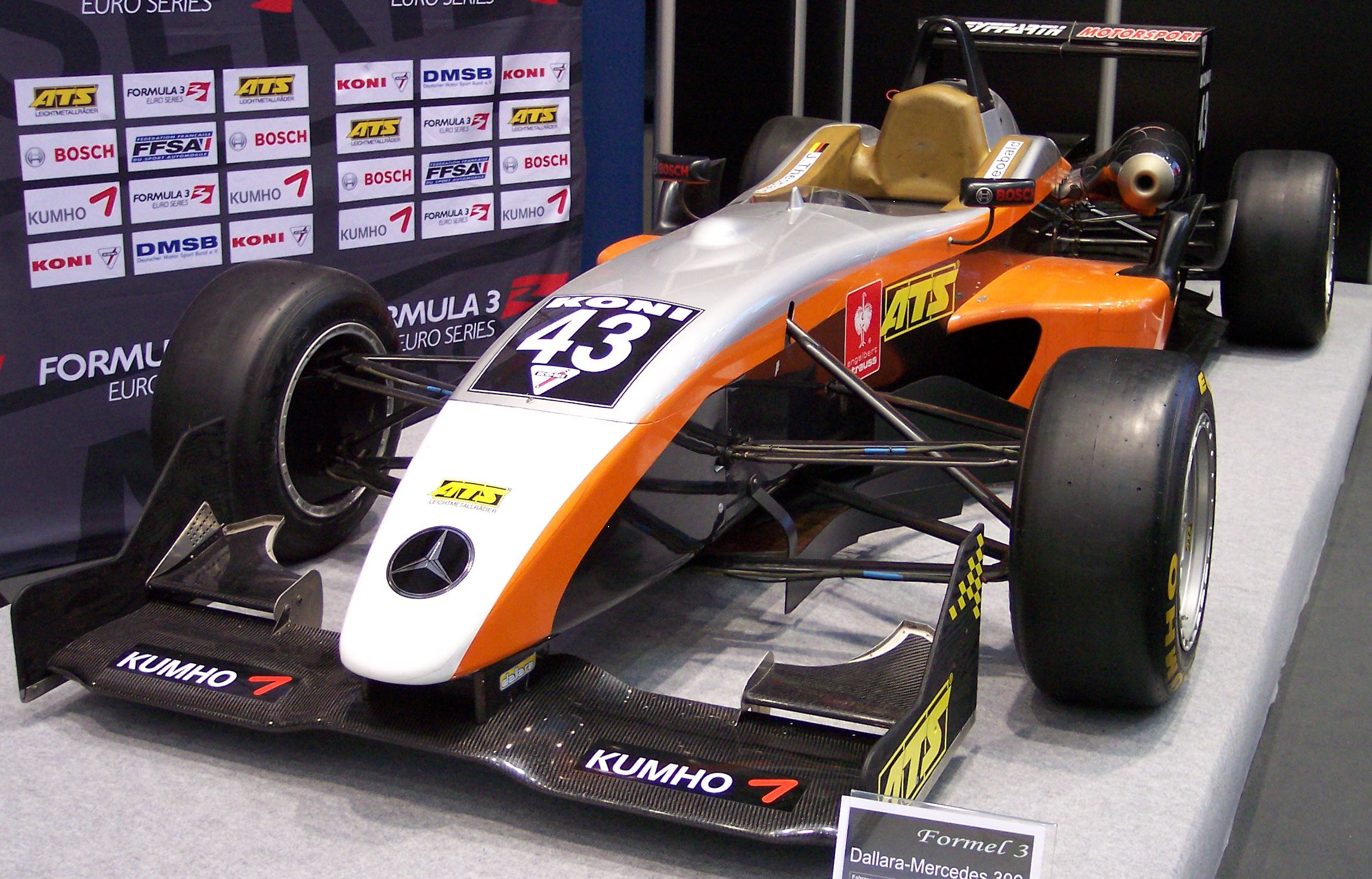
Dallara F306-Mercedes chassis on display.

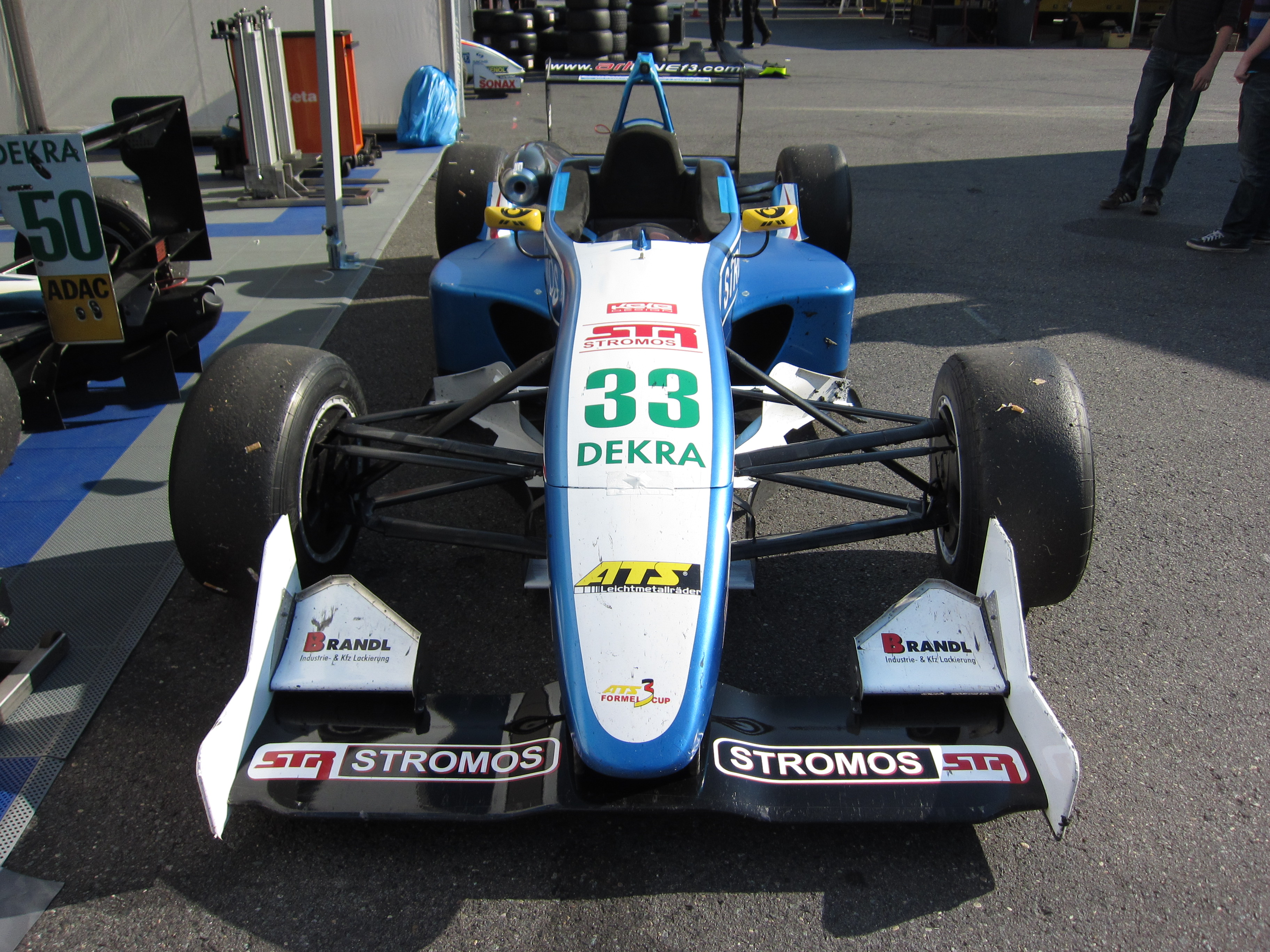
Stromos Artline Dallara F307 on display

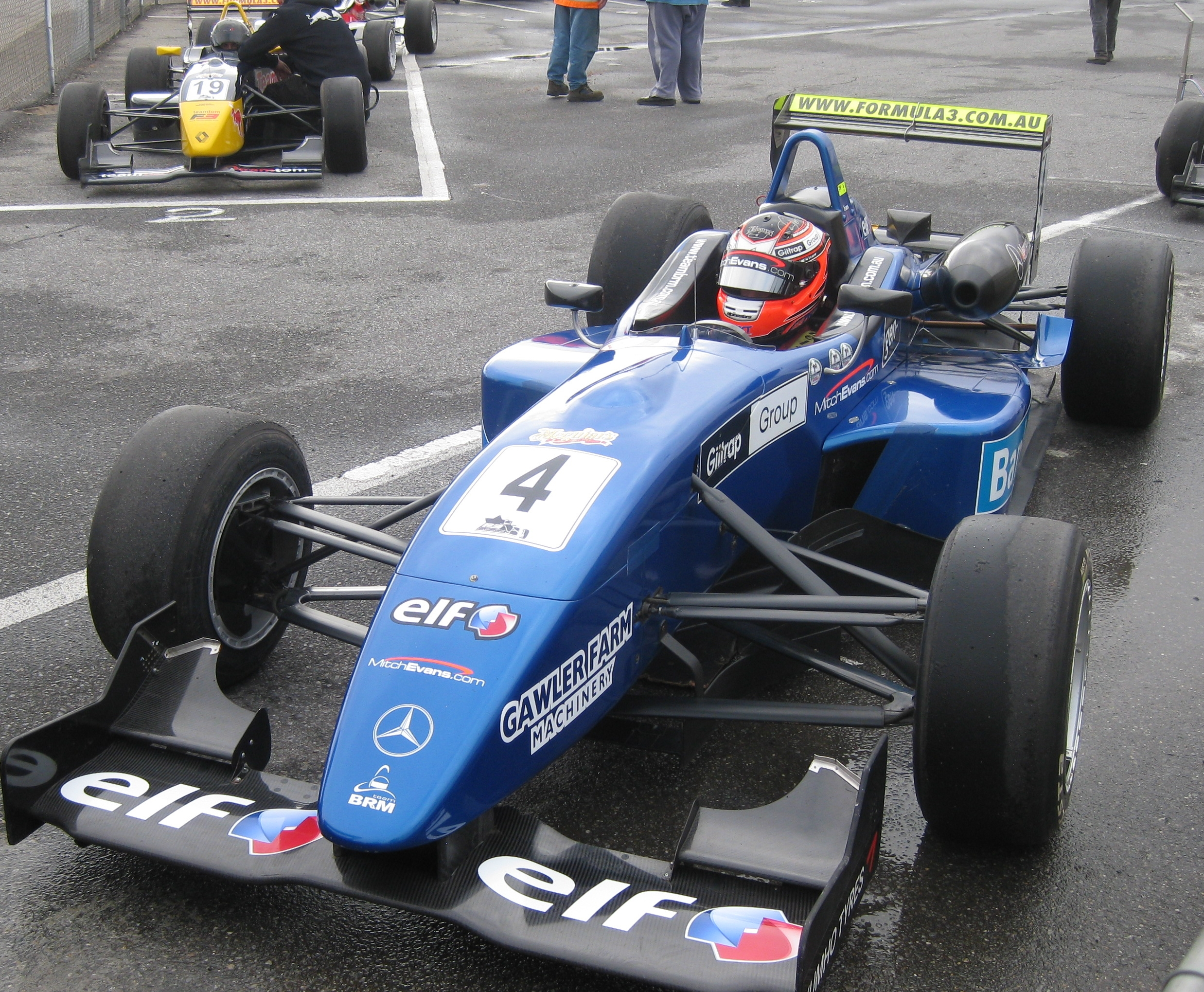
Dallara F307 of Mitch Evans, used in the 2010 Australian Drivers' Championship.

== F308 ==
Dallara F308 Dallara F309 Dallara F310 Dallara F311
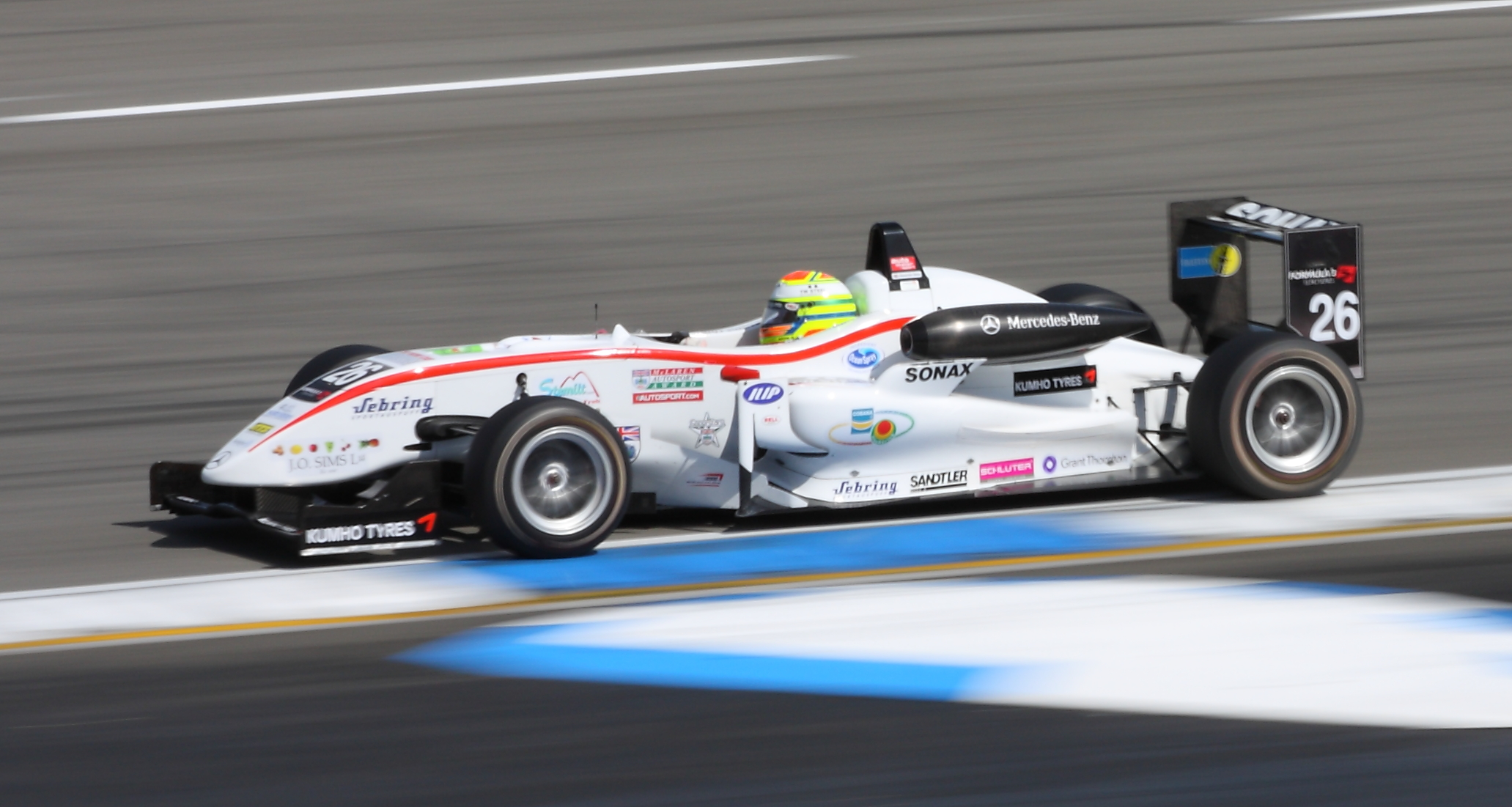
- Category: Formula Three
- Constructor: Dallara
- Designers: Luca Pignacca; Andrea Toso; Jos Claes; Ferdinando Concari
- Predecessor: Dallara F307
- Successor: Dallara F312

Technical specifications
- Chassis: Carbon fibre monocoque
- Suspension (front): Pushrod with twin-damper system and torsion-bar springs
- Suspension (rear): Pushrod with twin-damper system and coils springs
- Length: 4,264 mm (168 in)
- Width: 1,835 mm (72 in) including tyres
- Height: 950 mm (37 in)
- Axle track: 1,585 mm (62 in) (front); 1,535 mm (60 in) (rear)
- Wheelbase: 2,730 mm (107 in)
- Engine: Various manufacturers (Mercedes-Benz HWA, Spiess-Volkswagen, TOM's-Toyota, Spiess-Opel, Sodemo-Renault) 2.0 L (122 cu in) inline-4 engine naturally-aspirated, longitudinally mounted in a mid-engined, rear-wheel drive layout
- Transmission: Hewland 6-speed sequential
- Power: 217 hp (162 kW)
- Weight: 570 kg (1,257 lb) including driver
- Fuel: Various unleaded control fuel
- Lubricants: Various
- Brakes: Carbon brake discs, 6-piston calipers and pads
- Tyres: Various OZ 9”front & 10.5”rear

Competition history
- Debut: 2008

The Dallara F308 was built in 2008. It was used in different Formula Three racing categories and competitions between 2008 and 2011. It was later replaced and succeeded by the F312, in 2012.

The F308 can be upgraded to either the F309, the F310, or the F311, through Dallara's annual add-on kits. These include modifications in the area of aerodynamics such as additional air deflectors or similar or improved suspension units.

The F308 is a conventional Formula 3 racing car with a carbon fiber reinforced plastic monocoque, load-bearing mid-engined, and free-standing wheels. The Hewland FTR and the Pankl DGB03 gearbox are homologated for the car. It is shifted manually by means of ignition interruption and shift lever on the right side without the clutch. The front and rear wing elements, the front, and rear crash boxes, and the wheel carriers are also homologated. The bodywork can be done by the teams themselves. For example, the chimneys on the sidepods were removed from all teams in the Euroseries and the sidepods were laminated shut.

== F312 ==
Dallara F312 Dallara F313 Dallara F314 Dallara F315 Dallara F316
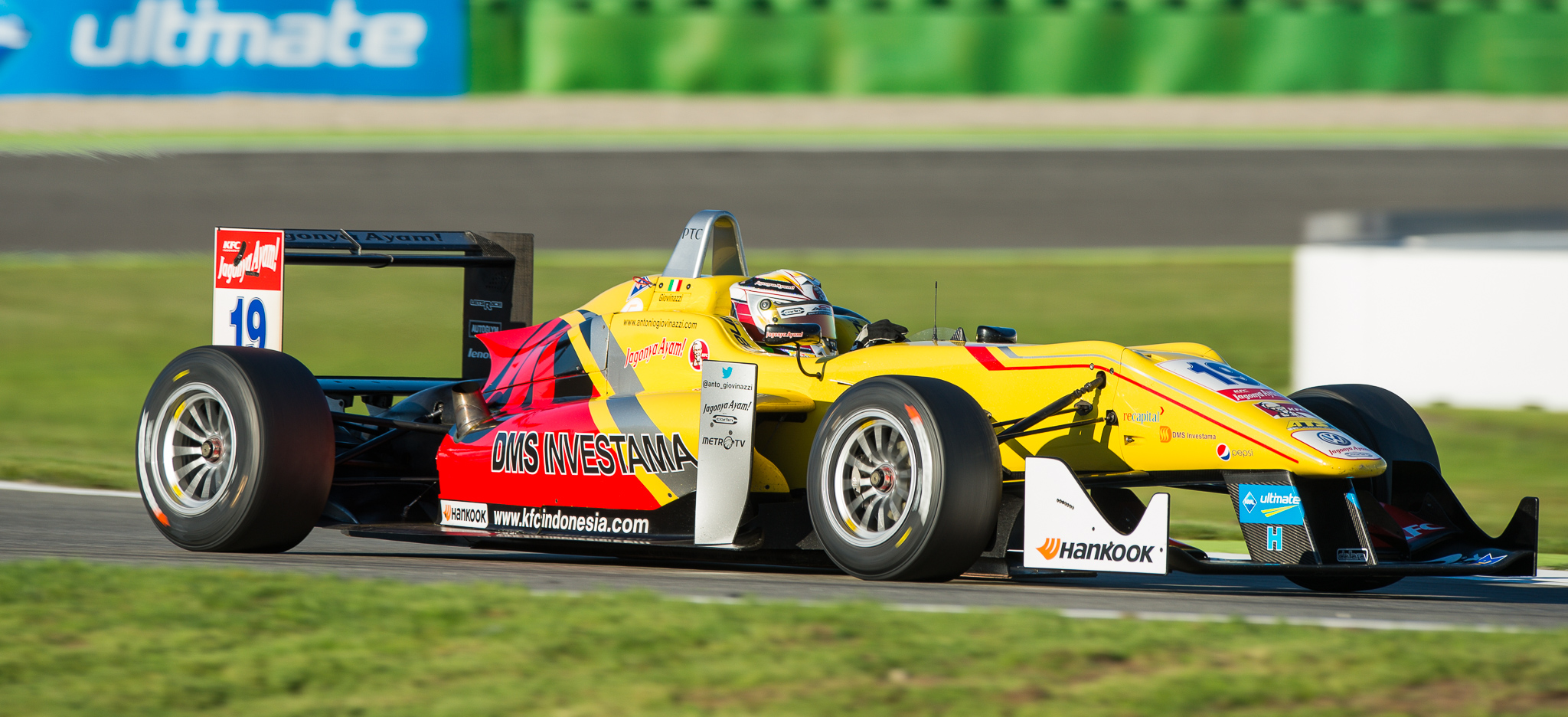
- Antonio Giovinazzi at the 2014 Hockenheim FIA Formula 3 European Championship round
- Category: Formula Three
- Constructor: Dallara
- Designers: Luca Pignacca; Andrea Toso; Jos Claes; Ferdinando Concari
- Predecessor: Dallara F308
- Successor: Dallara 320

Technical specifications
- Chassis: Carbon fibre monocoque
- Suspension (front): Pushrod with twin-damper system and torsion-bar springs
- Suspension (rear): Pushrod with twin-damper system and coils springs
- Length: 4,351 mm (171 in)
- Width: 1,845 mm (73 in) including tyres
- Height: 945 mm (37 in)
- Wheelbase: 2,800 mm (110 in)
- Engine: Various manufacturers (Mercedes-Benz F3 414, Volkswagen Spiess 0XY, Tomei-ThreeBond TB14F3, TOM's Toyota TAZ31, Mugen-Honda MF204D and Toda TR-F301) 2.0 L (122 cu in) inline-4 engine naturally-aspirated, longitudinally mounted in a mid-engined, rear-wheel drive layout
- Transmission: 6-speed semi-automatic sequential gearbox
- Power: 240 hp (179 kW)
- Weight: 580 kg (1,279 lb) including driver
- Fuel: Various unleaded control fuel
- Lubricants: Various
- Brakes: Carbon brake discs, 6-piston calipers and pads
- Tyres: Various

Competition history
- Debut: 2012

The Dallara F312 proved to be one of the most popular Formula 3 Chassis ever, with over 53 of the original type having been produced. Even after its successor the Dallara F317 was introduced, the F312 remained widely used, in championships such as the Euroformula Open Championship and the Japanese Formula 3 Championship.

The Dallara F312 was designed to meet the new for 2012 FIA Formula 3 regulations, which were much more restrictive compared to previous Formula 3 regulations, and led to reduced downforce levels. Compared to the previous generation Dallara F308, the 312 features a higher monocoque and a lower nose-section than the outgoing model, with the front dampers and springs being placed inside the tub, a first for a Dallara F3 car, alongside a revised aerodynamic package. The car was unveiled at the Masters of Formula 3 event on the 20th of October 2011 at Circuit Zandvoort, in the Netherlands.

== F317 ==
Dallara F317 Dallara F318
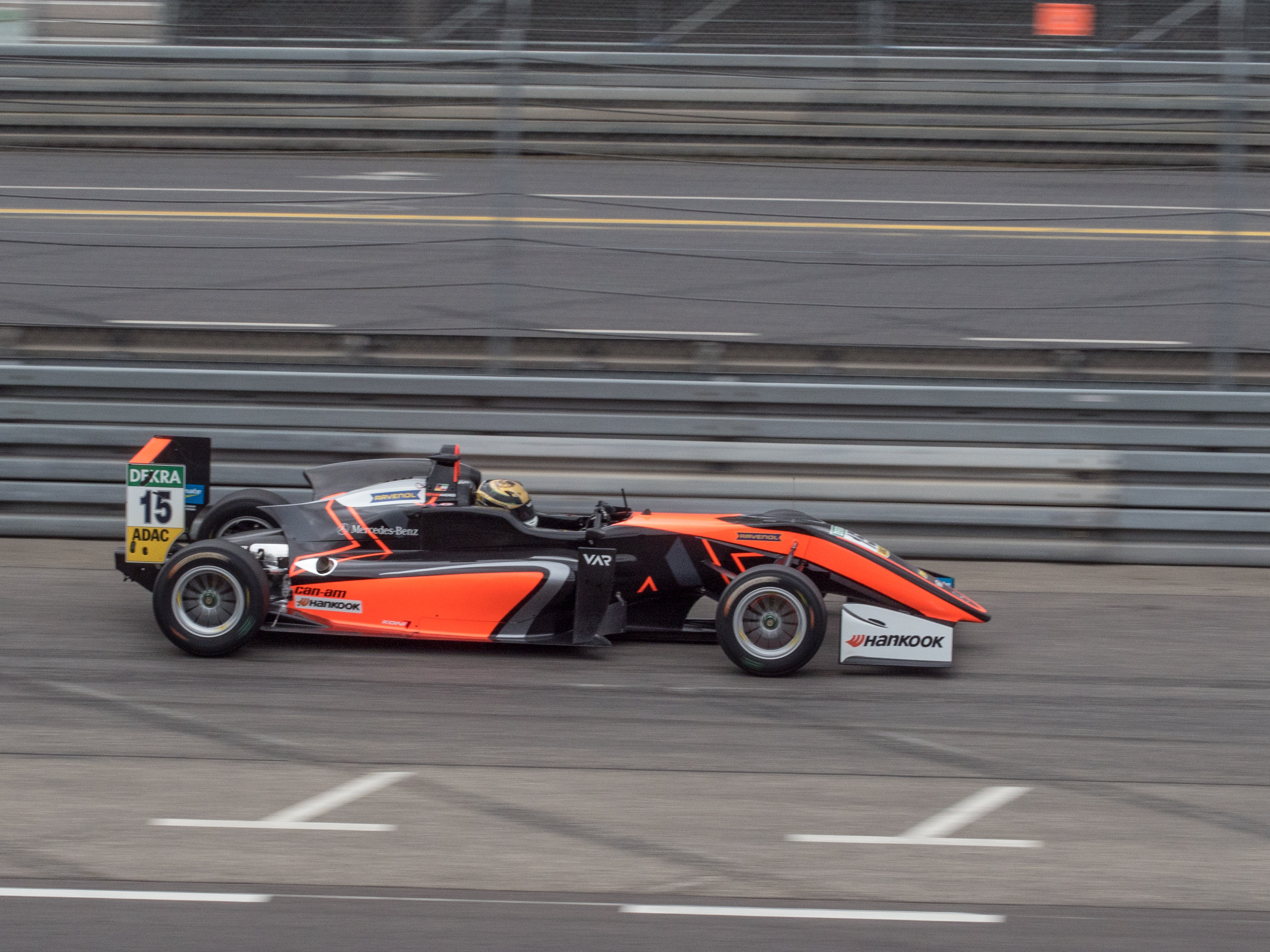
- Category: Formula Three
- Constructor: Dallara
- Designers: Luca Pignacca; Andrea Toso; Ferdinando Concari
- Predecessor: Dallara F312
- Successor: Dallara 320

Technical specifications
- Chassis: Carbon fibre monocoque
- Suspension (front): Pushrod with twin-damper system and torsion-bar springs
- Suspension (rear): Pushrod with twin-damper system and coils springs
- Length: 4,351 mm (171 in)
- Width: 1,845 mm (73 in) including tyres
- Height: 945 mm (37 in)
- Wheelbase: 2,800 mm (110 in)
- Engine: Various manufacturers (Mercedes-Benz F3 414, Volkswagen Spiess 0XY, Tomei-ThreeBond TB14F3, TOM's Toyota TAZ31, Mugen-Honda MF204D and Toda TR-F301) 2.0 L (122 cu in) inline-4 engine naturally-aspirated, longitudinally mounted in a mid-engined, rear-wheel drive layout
- Transmission: 6-speed semi-automatic sequential gearbox
- Power: 240 hp (179 kW)
- Weight: 580 kg (1,279 lb) including driver
- Fuel: Various unleaded control fuel
- Lubricants: Various
- Brakes: Carbon brake discs, 6-piston calipers and pads
- Tyres: Various

Competition history
- Debut: 2017

The Dallara F317 is the thirty-seventh car used by the FIA-sanctioned Formula Three championships. Although the F317 is only an aero-upgraded F312 chassis, it works as a replacement for the aging Dallara F312 chassis. However, some series like the Euroformula Open Championship opted for a slightly upgraded F312 chassis instead of the F317 package to keep costs low.
