= Mygale F3 car =

Mygale F3
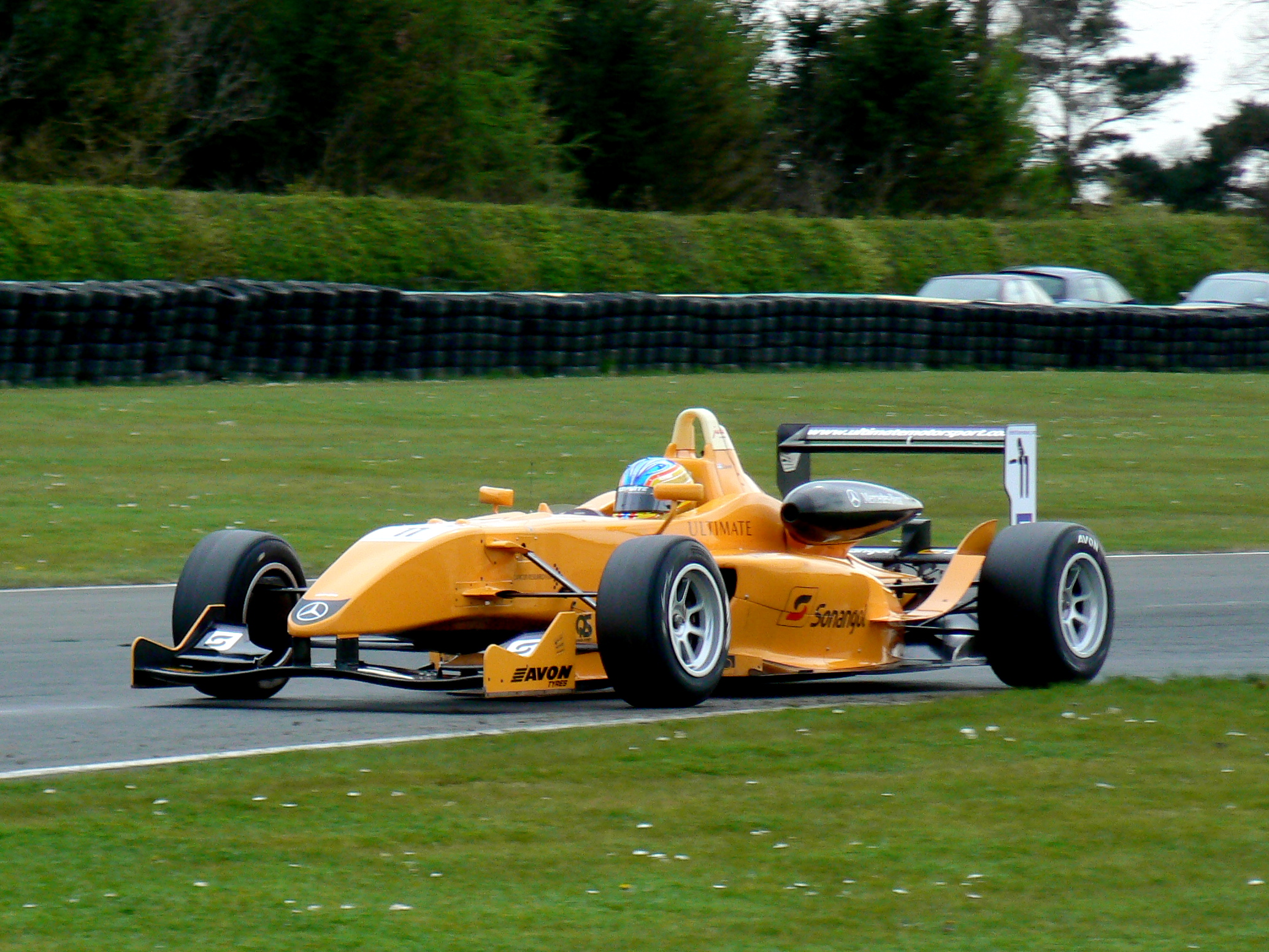
- Category: Formula Three
- Constructor: Mygale

Technical specifications
- Chassis: Carbon fiber monocoque
- Suspension: Double wishbones, push-rod actuated coil springs over shock absorbers, anti-roll bars
- Length: 4,894 mm (192.7 in)
- Width: 1,832 mm (72.1 in)
- Height: 988 mm (38.9 in)
- Engine: Mid-engine, longitudinally mounted, 2.0 L (122.0 cu in), Mercedes-Benz, Opel, Fiat or Volkswagen, DOHC I4, N/A; Oreca/Autotecnica (Fiat 1750 TBi-based) 1.8 L (109.8 cu in), DOHC I4, TC (Formula 3 Regional)
- Transmission: Sadev, Hewland FTR 8, Drexler F3 DGB003 6-speed sequential semi-automatic
- Power: 220–270 hp (164–201 kW)
- Weight: 540 kg (1,190 lb)
- Brakes: Disc brakes
- Tyres: Various

Competition history

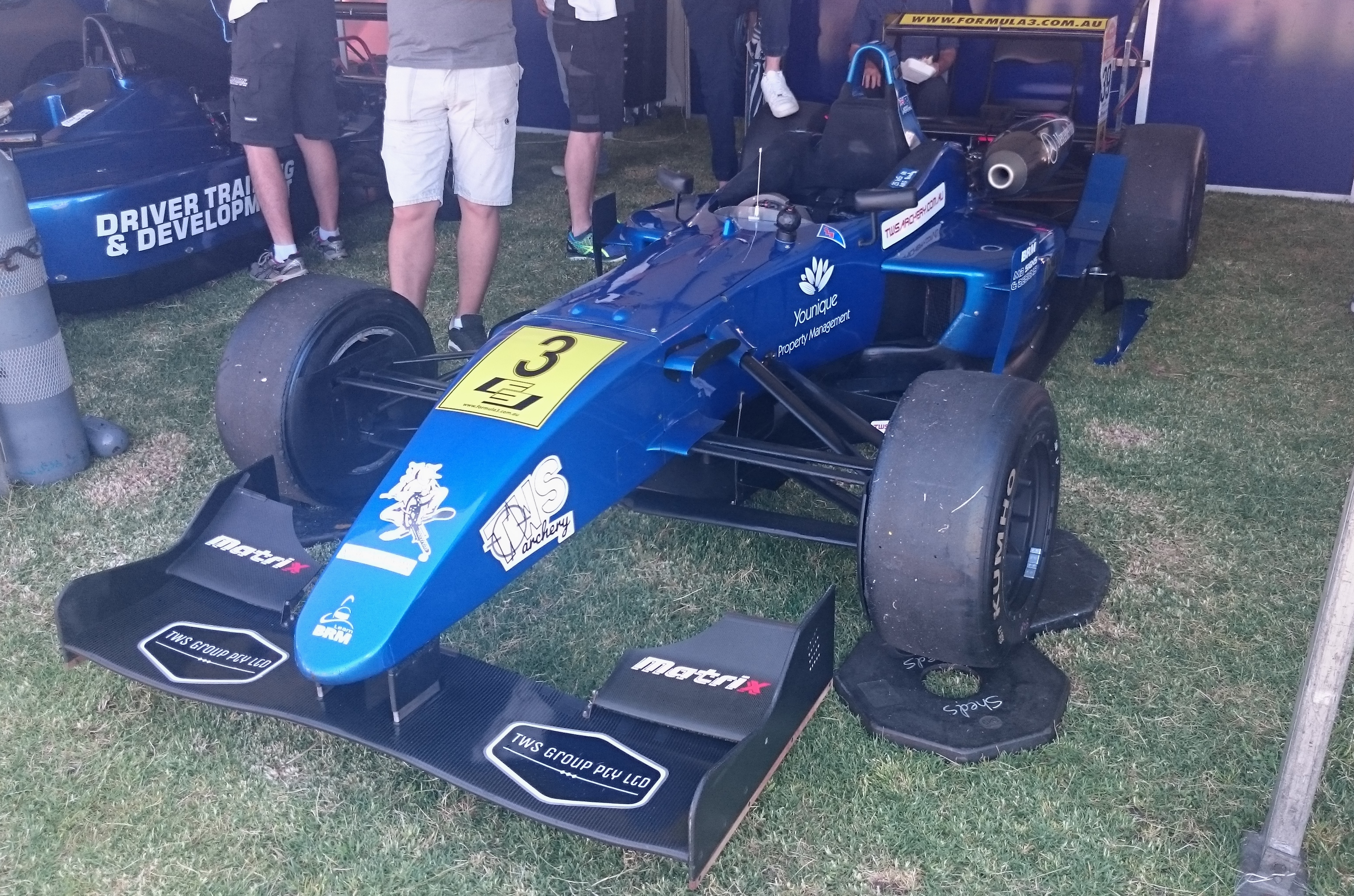
Mygale MII of Trent Shirvington

French race car manufacturer Mygale has designed, developed, and produced Formula 3 race since 2006, built to FIA standards, and conforming to the FIA's rules and regulations.

A new car developed in 2018, was intended to be used in the various Formula Three Regional series' (i.e., Formula Regional European Championship, Formula Regional Asian Championship, Formula Regional Indian Championship, and Formula Regional Japanese Championship)), but currently isn't run in any series.
