= 2021 TCR Eastern Europe Trophy =

2021 European motorsport event

The 2021 TCR Eastern Europe Trophy (also called 2021 TCR Eastern Europe Trophy powered by ESET for sponsorship reasons) is the third season of the TCR Eastern Europe Trophy. The season began on 15 April at the Hungaroring and will end on 5 September at Automotodrom Brno.

== Calendar ==
A new calendar was announced on 17 March 2021 with all rounds supporting the ESET V4 Cup.

Rnd.		Circuit/Location	Date
1	1	Hungaroring, Budapest, Hungary	15–17 April
1	2	Hungaroring, Budapest, Hungary	15–17 April
2	3	Automotodróm Slovakia Ring, Orechová Potôň, Slovakia	7–9 May
2	4	Automotodróm Slovakia Ring, Orechová Potôň, Slovakia	7–9 May
3	5	Tor Poznań, Poznań, Poland	11–13 June
3	6	Tor Poznań, Poznań, Poland	11–13 June
4	7	Automotodrom Grobnik, Rijeka, Croatia	23–25 July
4	8	Automotodrom Grobnik, Rijeka, Croatia	23–25 July
5	9	Automotodróm Slovakia Ring, Orechová Potôň, Slovakia	20–22 August
5	10	Automotodróm Slovakia Ring, Orechová Potôň, Slovakia	20–22 August
6	11	Automotodrom Brno, Brno, Czech Republic	3–5 September
6	12	Automotodrom Brno, Brno, Czech Republic	3–5 September

== Teams and drivers ==
Team	Car	No.	Drivers	Class	Rounds	Ref.
(Slovakia) Horňák-Aditis	Audi RS 3 LMS TCR	1	(Poland) Bartosz Groszek		3–6	
(Slovakia) Horňák-Aditis	Audi RS 3 LMS TCR	38	(Czech Republic) Radim Adámek		All	
(Slovakia) Horňák-Aditis	Audi RS 3 LMS TCR	96	(Czech Republic) Petr Fulín Jr.		1	
(Slovakia) Horňák-Aditis	Audi RS 3 LMS TCR	96	(Czech Republic) Miro Horňák		2	
(Poland) Basenhurt A&T Racing	Volkswagen Golf GTI TCR	2	(Poland) Tomasz Rzepecki	J	All	
(Slovenia) Lema Racing	CUPRA León TCR	3	(Italy) Giacomo Ghermandi		1–4	
(Slovenia) Lema Racing	CUPRA León Competición TCR	3	(Italy) Giacomo Ghermandi		5–6	
(Slovenia) Lema Racing	CUPRA León TCR	6	(Czech Republic) Petr Semerád		6	
(Czech Republic) Carpek Service	CUPRA León TCR	11	(Czech Republic) Tomáš Pekař		All	
(Austria) RTM Motorsport	Volkswagen Golf GTI TCR	13	(Austria) Rene Martinek		5	
(Hungary) M1RA	Hyundai i30 N TCR	13	(Hungary) Gergő Báldi		6	
(Czech Republic) Fullín Race Academy	CUPRA León Competición TCR	76	(Czech Republic) Petr Čížek		1-2	
(Czech Republic) Fullín Race Academy	CUPRA León Competición TCR	14	(Czech Republic) Petr Čížek		3-6	
(Czech Republic) Fullín Race Academy	CUPRA León Competición TCR	22	(Germany) Carol Wittke		All	
(Germany) Steibel Motorsprt	CUPRA León TCR	23	(Germany) Sebastian Steibel		All	
(Slovakia) ARC Bratislava	CUPRA León TCR	26	(Slovakia) Dávid Nemcek		2	
(Lithuania) NordPass	Hyundai i30 N TCR	27	(Lithuania) Jonas Karklys		5	
(Serbia) Vesnić Racing	Audi RS 3 LMS TCR	31	(Serbia) Milovan Vesnić		1–4	
(Germany) CS-Motorsport	Audi RS 3 LMS TCR	33	(Bosnia and Herzegovina) Sanel Cehic (Note: Sanel Cehic is a Bosnian driver but entered under a German racing licence.)		All	
(Czech Republic) Micanek Motorsport powered by Buggyra	CUPRA León TCR	44	(Czech Republic) Michal Makeš	J	All	
(Montenegro) AMSK Kotor	CUPRA León TCR	47	(Montenegro) Frano Dubreta		6	
(Poland) BTC Maszyny Racing	Audi RS 3 LMS TCR	53	(Poland) Łukasz Stolarczyk		1–4	
(Poland) Wyszomirski Racing	Honda Civic Type R TCR (FK2)	55	(Poland) Sebastian Kołakowski		3–4	
(Poland) Wyszomirski Racing	Honda Civic Type R TCR (FK2)	77	(Poland) Jakub Wyszomirski		3	
(Poland) BM Racing Team	Hyundai i30 N TCR	66	(Poland) Szymon Jabłoński	J	3	
(Croatia) Auto Klub Dubrovnik Racing	CUPRA León TCR	74	(Croatia) Žarko Knego		1–2, 4–5	

== Results ==
Rnd.		Circuit	Pole position	Fastest lap	Winning driver	Winning team	Winning Junior driver
1	1	Hungaroring, Budapest, Hungary	(Czech Republic) Tomáš Pekař	(Czech Republic) Tomáš Pekař	(Czech Republic) Tomáš Pekař	(Czech Republic) Carpek Service	(Czech Republic) Michal Makeš
1	2	Hungaroring, Budapest, Hungary		(Czech Republic) Tomáš Pekař	(Czech Republic) Tomáš Pekař	(Czech Republic) Carpek Service	(Czech Republic) Michal Makeš
2	3	Automotodróm Slovakia Ring, Orechová Potôň, Slovakia	(Serbia) Milovan Vesnić	(Czech Republic) Michal Makeš	(Czech Republic) Michal Makeš	(Czech Republic) Micanek Motorsport powered by Buggyra	(Czech Republic) Michal Makeš
2	4	Automotodróm Slovakia Ring, Orechová Potôň, Slovakia		(Czech Republic) Tomáš Pekař	(Czech Republic) Tomáš Pekař	(Czech Republic) Carpek Service	(Czech Republic) Michal Makeš
3	5	Tor Poznań, Poznań, Poland	(Czech Republic) Michal Makeš	(Czech Republic) Tomáš Pekař	(Czech Republic) Michal Makeš	(Czech Republic) Micanek Motorsport powered by Buggyra	(Czech Republic) Michal Makeš
3	6	Tor Poznań, Poznań, Poland		(Czech Republic) Michal Makeš	(Poland) Bartosz Groszek	(Slovakia) Horňák-Aditis	(Czech Republic) Michal Makeš
4	7	Automotodrom Grobnik, Rijeka, Croatia	(Serbia) Milovan Vesnić	(Poland) Bartosz Groszek	(Serbia) Milovan Vesnić	(Serbia) ASK Vesnić	(Czech Republic) Michal Makeš
4	8	Automotodrom Grobnik, Rijeka, Croatia		(Germany) Carol Wittke	(Czech Republic) Tomáš Pekař	(Czech Republic) Carpek Service	(Poland) Tomasz Rzepecki
5	9	Automotodróm Slovakia Ring, Orechová Potôň, Slovakia	(Czech Republic) Michal Makeš	(Lithuania) Jonas Karklys	(Lithuania) Jonas Karklys	(Lithuania) NordPass	(Czech Republic) Michal Makeš
5	10	Automotodróm Slovakia Ring, Orechová Potôň, Slovakia		(Czech Republic) Tomáš Pekař	(Czech Republic) Michal Makeš	(Czech Republic) Micanek Motorsport powered by Buggyra	(Poland) Tomasz Rzepecki
6	11	Automotodrom Brno, Brno, Czech Republic	(Germany) Carol Wittke	(Germany) Carol Wittke	(Germany) Carol Wittke	(Czech Republic) Fullín Race Academy	(Czech Republic) Michal Makeš
6	12	Automotodrom Brno, Brno, Czech Republic		(Poland) Bartosz Groszek	(Germany) Carol Wittke	(Czech Republic) Fullín Race Academy	(Czech Republic) Michal Makeš

=== Drivers' standings ===
Scoring system

Position	**1st**	**2nd**	**3rd**	**4th**	**5th**	**6th**	**7th**	**8th**	**9th**	**10th**
Race	25	18	15	12	10	8	6	4	2	1

Pos.	Driver	HUN (Hungary)		SVK (Slovakia)		POZ (Poland)		GRO (Croatia)		SVK (Slovakia)		BRN (Czech Republic)		Pts.
Pos.	Driver	R1	R2	R1	R2	R1	R2	R1	R2	R1	R2	R1	R2	Pts.
1	(Czech Republic) Michal Makeš	2	3	1	3	**1**	2	4	6	**4**	1	4	5	187
2	(Czech Republic) Tomáš Pekař	**1**	1	5	1	2	12	5	1	DNS	7	5	3	183
3	(Germany) Carol Wittke	9	7	3	4	10	6	3	3	3	4	**1**	1	155
4	(Poland) Bartosz Groszek					8	1	2	2	2	3	2	2	138
5	(Germany) Sebastian Steibel	7	5	2	2	6	3	6	Ret	9	5	6	4	113
6	(Serbia) Milovan Vesnić	3	4	**12**	6	11	Ret	**1**	Ret					68
7	(Poland) Tomasz Rzepecki	6	8	4	13	4	7	8	5	Ret	Ret	7	8	66
8	(Czech Republic) Petr Čížek	10	9	Ret	Ret	5	13†	7	Ret	8	10	3	6	49
9	(Lithuania) Jonas Karklys									1	2			44
10	(Poland) Łukasz Stolarczyk	5	2	7	12	7	Ret	Ret	DNS					40
11	(Italy) Giacomo Ghermandi	4	6	Ret	11	9	5	Ret	7	Ret	11	11	10	40
12	(Czech Republic) Radim Adámek	13	12	10	10	13	11	10	4	7	6	10	11	30
13	(Poland) Szymon Jabłoński					3	4							28
14	(Bosnia and Herzegovina) Sanel Cehic	12	11	11	9	12	8	Ret	Ret	5	8	13	Ret	20
15	(Czech Republic) Miro Hornak			6	5									18
16	(Croatia) Žarko Knego	11	DNS	9	7			9	DNS	6	Ret			18
17	(Czech Republic) Potr Semerad											9	7	8
18	(Slovakia) Dávid Nemcek			8	8									8
19	(Czech Republic) Petr Fulín Jr.	8	10											5
20	(Hungary) Gergö Baldi											8	Ret	4
21	(Austria) Rene Martinek									10	9			3
22	(Montenegro) Fraňo Dubreta											12	9	2
23	(Poland) Jakub Wyszomirski					14	9							2
24	(Poland) Sebastian Kołakowski					15	10	11	DNS					1
Pos.	Driver	HUN (Hungary)		SVK (Slovakia)		POZ (Poland)		GRO (Croatia)		SVK (Slovakia)		BRN (Czech Republic)		Pts.

Colour	Result
Gold	Winner
Silver	Second place
Bronze	Third place
Green	Points classification
Blue	Non-points classification
Blue	Non-classified finish (NC)
Purple	Retired, not classified (Ret)
Red	Did not qualify (DNQ)
Red	Did not pre-qualify (DNPQ)
Black	Disqualified (DSQ)
White	Did not start (DNS)
White	Withdrew (WD)
White	Race cancelled (C)
Blank	Did not practice (DNP)
Blank	Did not arrive (DNA)
Blank	Excluded (EX)

**Bold** – Pole

Italics – Fastest Lap

† – Drivers did not finish the race, but were classified as they completed over 70% of the race distance.

=== Teams' standings ===
Pos.	Team	HUN (Hungary)		SVK (Slovakia)		POZ (Poland)		GRO (Croatia)		SVK (Slovakia)		BRN (Czech Republic)		Pts.
Pos.	Team	RD1	RD2	RD1	RD2	RD1	RD2	RD1	RD2	RD1	RD2	RD1	RD2	Pts.
1	(Czech Republic) Fullín Race Academy	9	7	3	4	5	6	3	3	3	4	**1**	1	207
1	(Czech Republic) Fullín Race Academy	10	9	Ret	Ret	10	13†	7	Ret	8	10	3	6	207
2	(Czech Republic) Micanek Motorsport powered by Buggyra	2	3	1	3	**1**	2	4	6	**4**	1	4	5	205
3	(Slovakia) Horňák-Aditis	8	10	6	5	8	1	2	2	2	3	2	2	190
3	(Slovakia) Horňák-Aditis	13	12	10	10	13	11	10	4	7	6	10	11	190
4	(Czech Republic) Carpek Service	**1**	1	5	1	2	12	5	1	DNS	7	5	3	183
5	(Germany) Steibel Motorsprt	7	5	2	2	6	3	6	Ret	9	5	6	4	115
6	(Serbia) ASK Vesnić	3	4	**12**	6	11	Ret	**1**	Ret					68
7	(Poland) Basenhurt A&T Racing	6	8	4	13	4	7	8	5	Ret	Ret	7	8	66
8	(Slovenia) Lema Racing	4	6	Ret	11	9	5	Ret	7	Ret	11	9	7	48
8	(Slovenia) Lema Racing											11	10	48
9	(Lithuania) Nordpass									1	2			44
10	(Poland) BTC Maszyny Racing	5	2	7	12	7	Ret	Ret	DNS					40
11	(Poland) BM Racing Team					3	4							28
12	(Germany) CS-Motorsport	12	11	11	9	12	8	Ret	Ret	5	8	13	Ret	20
13	(Croatia) Auto Klub Dubrovnik Racing	11	DNS	9	7			9	DNS	6	Ret			18
14	(Slovakia) ARC Bratislava			8	8									8
15	(Hungary) M1RA											8	Ret	4
16	(Austria) RTM Motorsport									10	9			3
17	(Poland) Wyszomirski Racing					14	9	11	DNS					3
17	(Poland) Wyszomirski Racing					15	10							3
18	(Montenegro) AMSK Kotor											12	9	2
Pos.	Driver	HUN (Hungary)		SVK (Slovakia)		POZ (Poland)		GRO (Croatia)		SVK (Slovakia)		BRN (Czech Republic)		Pts.

Colour	Result
Gold	Winner
Silver	Second place
Bronze	Third place
Green	Points classification
Blue	Non-points classification
Blue	Non-classified finish (NC)
Purple	Retired, not classified (Ret)
Red	Did not qualify (DNQ)
Red	Did not pre-qualify (DNPQ)
Black	Disqualified (DSQ)
White	Did not start (DNS)
White	Withdrew (WD)
White	Race cancelled (C)
Blank	Did not practice (DNP)
Blank	Did not arrive (DNA)
Blank	Excluded (EX)

**Bold** – Pole

Italics – Fastest Lap

† – Drivers did not finish the race, but were classified as they completed over 70% of the race distance.

=== Juniors' standings ===
Pos.	Driver	HUN (Hungary)		SVK (Slovakia)		POZ (Poland)		GRO (Croatia)		SVK (Slovakia)		BRN (Czech Republic)		Pts.
Pos.	Driver	RD1	RD2	RD1	RD2	RD1	RD2	RD1	RD2	RD1	RD2	RD1	RD2	Pts.
1	(Czech Republic) Michal Makeš	2	3	1	3	1	2	4	6	4	1	4	5	187
2	(Poland) Tomasz Rzepecki	6	8	4	13	4	7	8	5	Ret	Ret	7	8	66
3	(Poland) Łukasz Stolarczyk	5	2	7	12	7	Ret	Ret	DNS					40
4	(Czech Republic) Radim Adámek	13	12	10	10	13	11	10	4	7	6	10	11	30
5	(Poland) Szymon Jabłoński					3	4							28
6	(Bosnia and Herzegovina) Sanel Cehic	12	11	11	9	12	8	Ret	Ret	5	8	13	Ret	20
7	(Czech Republic) Miro Hornak			6	5									18
8	(Croatia) Žarko Knego	11	DNS	9	7			9	DNS	6	Ret			18
9	(Czech Republic) Petr Fulín Jr.	8	10											5
10	(Hungary) Gergö Baldi											8	Ret	4
11	(Austria) Rene Martinek									10	9			3
12	(Montenegro) Fraňo Dubreta											12	9	2
13	(Poland) Jakub Wyszomirski					14	9							2
14	(Poland) Sebastian Kołakowski					15	10	11	DNS					1
Pos.	Driver	HUN (Hungary)		SVK (Slovakia)		POZ (Poland)		GRO (Croatia)		SVK (Slovakia)		BRN (Czech Republic)		Pts.

Colour	Result
Gold	Winner
Silver	Second place
Bronze	Third place
Green	Points classification
Blue	Non-points classification
Blue	Non-classified finish (NC)
Purple	Retired, not classified (Ret)
Red	Did not qualify (DNQ)
Red	Did not pre-qualify (DNPQ)
Black	Disqualified (DSQ)
White	Did not start (DNS)
White	Withdrew (WD)
White	Race cancelled (C)
Blank	Did not practice (DNP)
Blank	Did not arrive (DNA)
Blank	Excluded (EX)

**Bold** – Pole

Italics – Fastest Lap

† – Drivers did not finish the race, but were classified as they completed over 70% of the race distance.
