= 2025 TCR Eastern Europe Trophy =

2025 European motorsport season

The 2025 TCR Eastern Europe Trophy was the seventh season of the TCR Eastern Europe Trophy.

== Calendar ==
The 2025 calendar was announced on 11 December 2024. The season remains at six events with two races per event for a total of 12 races.

Part of the TCR Croatia

Rnd.		Circuit/Location	Date
1	1	Red Bull Ring, Spielberg, Austria	13 April
1	2	Red Bull Ring, Spielberg, Austria	13 April
2	3	Salzburgring, Plainfeld, Austria	1 June
2	4	Salzburgring, Plainfeld, Austria	1 June
3	5	Autodrom Most, Most, Czech Republic	27 July
3	6	Autodrom Most, Most, Czech Republic	27 July
4	7	Automotodróm Slovakia Ring, Orechová Potôň, Slovakia	24 August
4	8	Automotodróm Slovakia Ring, Orechová Potôň, Slovakia	24 August
5	9	Brno Circuit, Brno, Czech Republic	7 September
5	10	Brno Circuit, Brno, Czech Republic	7 September
6	11	Balaton Park Circuit, Balatonfőkajár, Hungary	28 September
6	12	Balaton Park Circuit, Balatonfőkajár, Hungary	28 September

== Teams and drivers ==
Team	Car	No.	Drivers	Rounds	Ref.
(Slovenia) AMD Slovenija Avto	Hyundai Elantra N TCR	2	(Slovenia) Robert Pravdič	1, 3	
(Italy) MM Motorsport	Honda Civic Type R TCR (FL5)	3	(Italy) Giacomo Ghermandi	1–3	
(Sweden) MA:GP	Lynk & Co 03 TCR	10	(Sweden) Viktor Andersson	1	
(Czech Republic) Janik Motorsport	Hyundai Elantra N TCR	11	(Czech Republic) Jiří Zbožínek	All	
(Czech Republic) Janik Motorsport	Hyundai Elantra N TCR (2024)	68	(Czech Republic) Adam Kout	All	
(Czech Republic) Express Auto Racing	Cupra León VZ TCR	13	(Czech Republic) Petr Semerád	2	
(Czech Republic) Express Auto Racing	Cupra León VZ TCR	14	(Czech Republic) Petr Čížek	All	
(Czech Republic) Express Auto Racing	Cupra León Competición TCR	69	(Slovakia) Radoslav Obrtal	3–5	
(Czech Republic) Express Auto Racing	Cupra León Competición TCR	69	(Slovakia) Peter Szilagyi	3–5	
(Czech Republic) Express Auto Racing	Cupra León Competición TCR	82	(Czech Republic) Vít Smejkal	3–5	
(Latvia) LV Racing	Audi RS 3 LMS TCR (2021)	21	(Latvia) Ivars Vallers	1–5	
(Croatia) Auto Klub Dubrovnik	Cupra León Competición TCR	48	(Montenegro) Fraňo Dubreta	1–2	
(Croatia) Auto Klub Dubrovnik	Hyundai Elantra N TCR	74	(Croatia) Žarko Knego	All	
(Croatia) Auto Klub Dubrovnik	Hyundai i30 N TCR	703	(Croatia) Luka Fabijančić	4, 6	
(Czech Republic) Aditis Racing	Audi RS 3 LMS TCR (2021)	97	(Poland) Bartosz Groszek	All	
(Czech Republic) Aditis Racing	Audi RS 3 LMS TCR (2021)	301	(Czech Republic) Martin Kadlečík	All	
(Serbia) Ahilej Racing	Hyundai i30 N TCR	365	(Serbia) Nemanja Milovanović	4, 6	
(Austria) Bernhard Stitz	Hyundai Elantra N TCR	432	(Austria) Bernhard Stitz	1	
(Austria) Dominik Haselsteiner	Cupra León TCR	455	(Austria) Dominik Haselsteiner	1	
(Croatia) ASK Kastavac	Honda Civic FK2 TCR	701	(Croatia) Bojan Miljković	4, 6	

== Results ==
Rnd.		Circuit	Pole position	Fastest lap	Winning driver	Winning team
1	1	(Austria) Red Bull Ring	(Czech Republic) Adam Kout	(Czech Republic) Adam Kout	(Czech Republic) Adam Kout	(Czech Republic) Janik Motorsport
1	2	(Austria) Red Bull Ring		(Czech Republic) Adam Kout	(Italy) Giacomo Ghermandi	(Italy) MM Motorsport
2	3	(Austria) Salzburgring	(Italy) Giacomo Ghermandi	(Czech Republic) Martin Kadlečík	(Czech Republic) Martin Kadlečík	(Czech Republic) Aditis Racing
2	4	(Austria) Salzburgring		(Italy) Giacomo Ghermandi	(Czech Republic) Adam Kout	(Czech Republic) Janik Motorsport
3	5	(Czech Republic) Autodrom Most	(Czech Republic) Adam Kout	(Czech Republic) Martin Kadlečík	(Czech Republic) Martin Kadlečík	(Czech Republic) Aditis Racing
3	6	(Czech Republic) Autodrom Most		(Czech Republic) Adam Kout	(Czech Republic) Adam Kout	(Czech Republic) Janik Motorsport
4	7	Automotodróm Slovakia Ring	(Czech Republic) Adam Kout	(Czech Republic) Adam Kout	(Czech Republic) Adam Kout	(Czech Republic) Janik Motorsport
4	8	Automotodróm Slovakia Ring		(Czech Republic) Adam Kout	(Czech Republic) Adam Kout	(Czech Republic) Janik Motorsport
5	9	(Czech Republic) Brno Circuit	(Czech Republic) Adam Kout	(Czech Republic) Jiří Zbožínek	(Czech Republic) Martin Kadlečík	(Czech Republic) Aditis Racing
5	10	(Czech Republic) Brno Circuit		(Czech Republic) Jiří Zbožínek	(Czech Republic) Martin Kadlečík	(Czech Republic) Aditis Racing
6	11	(Hungary) Balaton Park Circuit	(Czech Republic) Adam Kout	(Czech Republic) Adam Kout	(Czech Republic) Adam Kout	(Czech Republic) Janik Motorsport
6	12	(Hungary) Balaton Park Circuit		(Czech Republic) Adam Kout	(Czech Republic) Jiří Zbožínek	(Czech Republic) Janik Motorsport

== Drivers' standings ==
Scoring system

Position	**1st**	**2nd**	**3rd**	**4th**	**5th**	**6th**	**7th**	**8th**	**9th**	**10th**	Fastest lap
Qualifying	3	2	1	—N/a							
Race	25	18	15	12	10	8	6	4	2	1	1

Pos.	Driver	RBR (Austria)		SLZ (Austria)		MOS (Czech Republic)		SVK (Slovakia)		BRN (Czech Republic)		BAL (Hungary)		Pts.
Pos.	Driver	R1	R2	R1	R2	R1	R2	R1	R2	R1	R2	R1	R2	Pts.
1	(Czech Republic) Adam Kout	**1**^{1}	2	8^{3}	1	**4**^{1}	1	**1**^{1}	1	**2**^{1}	2	**1**^{1}	2	262
2	(Czech Republic) Martin Kadlečík	3	3	1^{2}	3	1^{2}	2	2^{3}	2	1^{3}	1	2^{2}	Ret	226
3	(Poland) Bartosz Groszek	2^{3}	4	2	2	Ret^{3}	3	3	3	4	3	3^{3}	4	168
4	(Czech Republic) Jiří Zbožínek	4	6	7	7	3	6	5	6	3^{2}	4	5	1	139
5	(Czech Republic) Petr Čížek	7	9	Ret	6	2	Ret	4	5	5	5	4	3	105
6	(Croatia) Žarko Knego	5	Ret	4	4	6	Ret	6^{2}	4	6	6	6	Ret	88
7	(Latvia) Ivars Vallers	6	8	3	5	5	4	Ret	11	8	8			71
8	(Italy) Giacomo Ghermandi	9^{2}	1	**6**^{1}	Ret	9	Ret							45
9	(Czech Republic) Vít Smejkal					7	5	Ret	8	7	7			36
10	(Croatia) Luka Fabijančić							8	10			7	6	24
11	(Slovakia) Radoslav Obrtal					8	7	9	9	DNS	Ret			18
11	(Slovakia) Peter Szilagyi					8	7	9	9	DNS	Ret			18
12	(Czech Republic) Petr Semerád			5	8									14
13	(Sweden) Viktor Andersson	10	5											12
14	(Croatia) Bojan Miljković							Ret	12			8	7	12
15	(Slovakia) Robert Pravdič	11	11											3
Guest entries ineligible for points
-	(Serbia) Nemanja Milovanović							7	7			Ret	5	-
-	(Austria) Dominik Haselsteiner	DNS	7											-
-	(Austria) Bernhard Stitz	8	10											-
Pos.	Driver	RBR (Austria)		SLZ (Austria)		MOS (Czech Republic)		SVK (Slovakia)		BRN (Czech Republic)		BAL (Hungary)		Pts.

Colour	Result
Gold	Winner
Silver	Second place
Bronze	Third place
Green	Points classification
Blue	Non-points classification
Blue	Non-classified finish (NC)
Purple	Retired, not classified (Ret)
Red	Did not qualify (DNQ)
Red	Did not pre-qualify (DNPQ)
Black	Disqualified (DSQ)
White	Did not start (DNS)
White	Withdrew (WD)
White	Race cancelled (C)
Blank	Did not practice (DNP)
Blank	Did not arrive (DNA)
Blank	Excluded (EX)

**Bold** – Pole

Italics – Fastest Lap

^{1 2 3} – Qualifying position

† – Drivers did not finish the race, but were classified as they completed over 70% of the race distance.
