= Adam Kout =

Czech racing driver (born 1990)

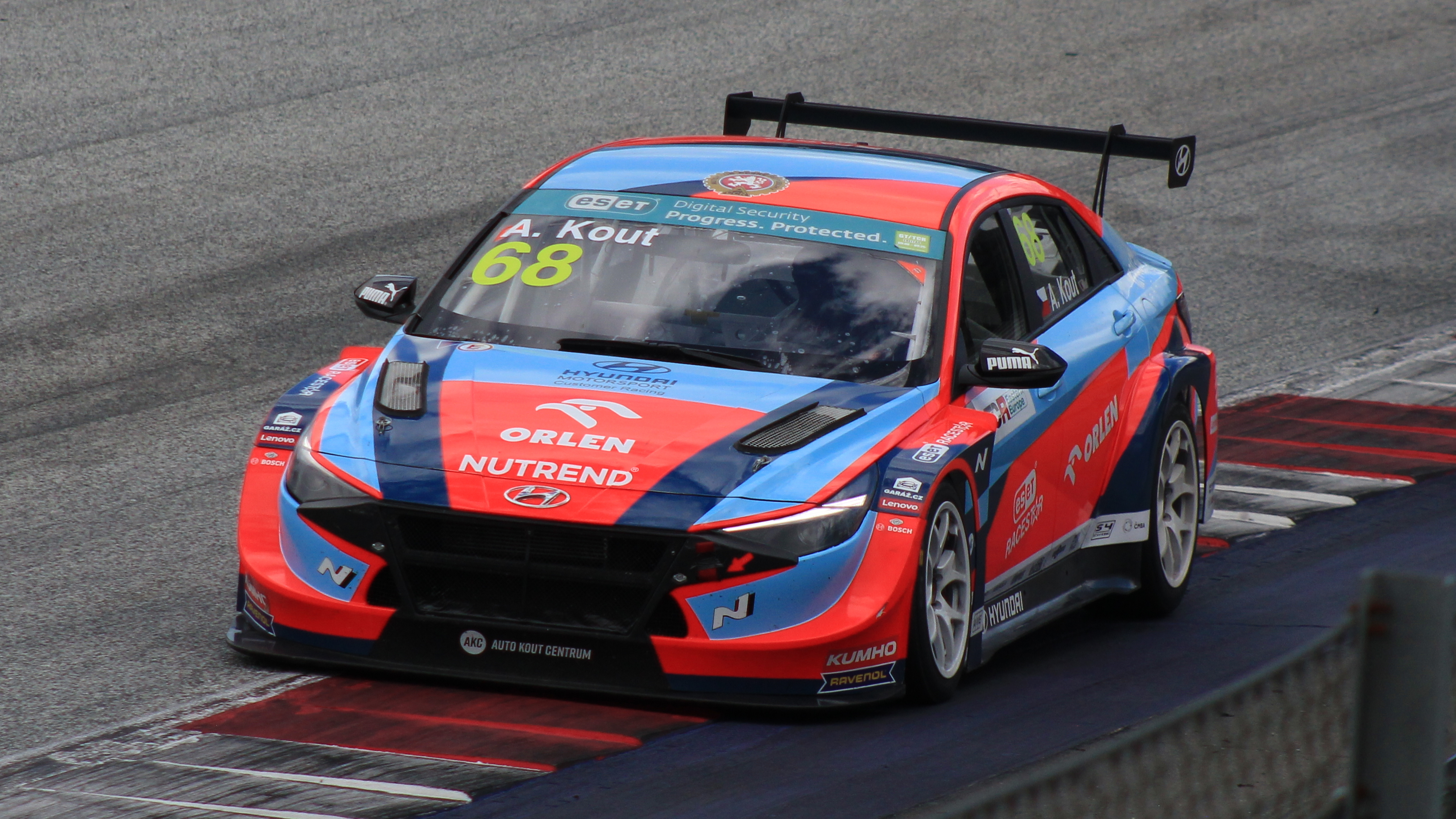
- Kout in 2024
- Nationality: (Czech Republic) Czech
- Born: 5 November 1990 (age 36) Brandýs nad Labem-Stará Boleslav, Czechoslovakia

Previous series
- 2023 2008–2010 2008–2010 2007: CEZ Circuit; Eurocup Formula Renault 2.0; Formula Renault 2.0 NEC; Formula Renault 2.0 Switzerland

Championship titles
- 2025 2007: TCR Eastern Europe Trophy; Formula Renault 2.0 Switzerland

Adam Kout (born 5 April 1990) is a Czech racing driver who currently competes for Hyundai / Janík Motorsport in the TCR Eastern Europe Touring Car Series.

Kout was the champion of the 2007 Formula Renault 2.0 Switzerland season before becoming a MS Kart factory driver for ten years, winning the FIA European Superkart Championship in 2015 and 2016.

After returning from retirement in 2023, Kout has raced in the TCR Eastern Europe Touring Car Series for Janík Motorsport, winning the 2025 title.

== Karting record ==
=== Karting career summary ===
Season	Series	Team	Position
2003	European Championship – Central Region Qualification – ICA Junior	MS Kart Racing Team	27th
2010	FIA European Championship – SK	MS Kart Racing Team	6th
2011	International Superkart Series – Division 1	MS Kart Racing Team	4th
2012	FIA European Championship – SK	MS Kart Racing Team	5th
2013	FIA European Championship – SK	MS Kart Racing Team	3rd
2014	French Superkart Championship		40th
2014	FIA European Championship – SK	MS Kart Racing Team	2nd
2015	FIA European Championship – SK	MS Kart Racing Team	1st
2016	FIA European Championship – SK	MS Kart Racing Team v ACR	1st
2017	FIA European Championship – SK	MS Kart Racing Team	2nd
2018	FIA European Championship – SK	MS Kart Racing Team	2nd
2019	FIA European Championship – SK		13th

== Racing record ==
=== Racing career summary ===
Season	Series	Team	Races	Wins	Poles	F/Laps	Podiums	Points	Position
2007	Formula Renault 2.0 Switzerland	Bossy Racing Team	12	2	0	4	8	242	**1st**
2008	Formula Renault 2.0 NEC	Krenek Motorsport	4	0	0	0	0	12	29th
2008	Eurocup Formula Renault 2.0	Krenek Motorsport	14	0	0	0	0	0	30th
2009	Formula Renault 2.0 NEC	Krenek Motorsport	4	1	1	0	1	63	20th
2009	Eurocup Formula Renault 2.0	Krenek Motorsport	14	0	0	0	1	15	13th
2010	Formula Renault 2.0 NEC	Krenek Motorsport	2	0	0	0	1	20	29th
2010	Eurocup Formula Renault 2.0	Krenek Motorsport	6	0	0	0	1	29	11th
2023	TCR Eastern Europe Trophy	Hyundai / Janík Motorsport	12	1	0	2	3	143	**3rd**
2023	CEZ Circuit – D4TC	Hyundai / Janík Motorsport	6	1	?	?	4	94	**2nd**
2024	TCR Eastern Europe Trophy	Hyundai / Janík Motorsport	12	4	2	7	10	231	**2nd**
2024	TCR Europe Touring Car Series	Hyundai / Janík Motorsport	2	0	0	0	0	0	NC†
2024	FIA Motorsport Games Touring Car Cup	Team Czech Republic	1	0	0	0	1	N/A	**3rd**
2025	TCR Eastern Europe Trophy	Hyundai / Janík Motorsport	12	9	6	7	10	262	**1st**
2026	TCR Eastern Europe Touring Car Series	Hyundai / Janík Motorsport	11	4	5	7	10	227	**2nd**

^{*} Season still in progress.
^{†} As Kout was a guest driver, he was ineligible to score points.

=== Complete Formula Renault 2.0 Switzerland results ===
(key) (Races in bold indicate pole position; races in italics indicate fastest lap)

Year	Entrant	1	2	3	4	5	6	7	8	9	10	11	12	DC	Points
2007	Bossy Racing Team	DIJ; 1; 2	DIJ; 2; 1	HOC; 1; 2	HOC; 2; 2	VAR; 1; 7	VAR; 2; 7	MOS; 1; 3	MOS; 2; 1	MAG; 1; 3	MAG; 2; 5	SAL; 1; 4	SAL; 2; 3	1st	242

=== Complete Formula Renault 2.0 NEC results ===
(key) (Races in bold indicate pole position) (Races in italics indicate fastest lap)

Year	Entrant	1	2	3	4	5	6	7	8	9	10	11	12	13	14	15	16	17	18	19	20	DC	Points
2008	Krenek Motorsport	HOC; 1	HOC; 2	ZAN; 1	ZAN; 2	ALA; 1	ALA; 2	OSC; 1	OSC; 2	ASS; 1	ASS; 2	ZOL; 1	ZOL; 2	NÜR; 1 Ret	NÜR; 2; 9	SPA; 1; 22	SPA; 2; 28†					29th	12
2009	Krenek Motorsport	ZAN; 1	ZAN; 2	HOC; 1	HOC; 2	ALA; 1	ALA; 2	OSC; 1; 11	OSC; 2; 13	ASS; 1	ASS; 2	**MST**; **1**; 1	MST; 2; 6	NÜR; 1	NÜR; 2	SPA; 1	SPA; 2					20th	63
2010	Krenek Motorsport	HOC; 1	HOC; 2	BRN; 1 Ret	BRN; 2; 3	ZAN; 1	ZAN; 2	OSC; 1	OSC; 2	OSC; 3	ASS; 1	ASS; 2	MST; 1	MST; 2	MST; 3	SPA; 1	SPA; 2	SPA; 3	NÜR; 1	NÜR; 2	NÜR; 3	29th	20

=== Complete Eurocup Formula Renault 2.0 results ===
(key) (Races in bold indicate pole position; races in italics indicate fastest lap)

Year	Entrant	1	2	3	4	5	6	7	8	9	10	11	12	13	14	DC	Points
2008	Krenek Motorsport	SPA; 1; 20	SPA; 2; 12	SIL; 1; 22	SIL; 2; 18	HUN; 1; 21	HUN; 2; 25	NÜR; 1; 24	NÜR; 2; 37†	LMS; 1; 11	LMS; 2; 28	EST; 1; 25	EST; 2; 23	CAT; 1; 22	CAT; 2 Ret	30th	0
2009	Krenek Motorsport	CAT; 1; 12	CAT; 2; 8	SPA; 1; 19	SPA; 2 Ret	HUN; 1; 11	HUN; 2; 11	SIL; 1 Ret	SIL; 2; 2	LMS; 1; 13	LMS; 2; 14	NÜR; 1; 19	NÜR; 2; 15	ALC; 1; 21	ALC; 2; 15	13th	15
2010	Krenek Motorsport	ALC; 1	ALC; 2	SPA; 1; 6	SPA; 2; 5	BRN; 1; 2	BRN; 2 Ret	MAG; 1 DNS	MAG; 2 DNS	HUN; 1; 7	HUN; 2 Ret	SIL; 1	SIL; 2	CAT; 1	CAT; 2	11th	29

=== Complete TCR Eastern Europe Touring Car Series results ===
(key) (Races in bold indicate pole position in class) (Races in italics indicate fastest lap in class)

Year	Entrant	Car	1	2	3	4	5	6	7	8	9	10	11	12	Rank	Points
2023	Hyundai / Janík Motorsport	Hyundai Elantra N TCR	OSH; 1; 3	OSH; 2; 4	HUN; 1; 5	HUN; 2; 4	RBR; 1; 13	RBR; 2; 7	SVK; 1; 4	SVK; 2; 7	MOS; 1; 5	MOS; 2; 1	BRN; 1; 4	BRN; 2; 2	3rd	143
2024	Hyundai / Janík Motorsport	Hyundai Elantra N TCR	**BAL**; **1**; 2	BAL; 2; 4	RBR; 1; 2	RBR; 2; 2	SVK; 1; 12	SVK; 2; 3	MOS; 1; 2	MOS; 2; 1	BRN; 1; 7	BRN; 2; 5	**SAL**; **1**; 1	SAL; 2; 1	2nd	231
2025	Hyundai / Janík Motorsport	Hyundai Elantra N TCR	**RBR**; **1**; 1	RBR; 2; 2	SAL; 1; 8	**SAL**; **2**; 1	**MOS**; **1**; 4	MOS; 2; 1	**SVK**; **1**; 1	SVK; 2; 1	**BRN**; **1**; 2	BRN; 2; 2	**BAL**; **1**; 1	BAL; 2; 2	1st	262
2026	Hyundai / Janík Motorsport	Hyundai Elantra N TCR	**GRO**; **1** Ret	GRO; 2; 3	**SAL**; **1**; 1	**SAL**; **2**; 1	SAL; 3; 2	MOS; 1	MOS; 2	SVK; 1	SVK; 2	HUN; 1	HUN; 2		2nd*	92*

^{*} Season still in progress.

=== Complete FIA Motorsport Games Touring Car Cup results ===
Year	Team	Cup	Qualifying	Quali Race	Main Race
2024	Team Czech Republic	**TCR Touring Car**	7th	**3rd**	**3rd**
