= 2023 TCR Eastern Europe Trophy =

2023 European motorsport event

The 2023 TCR Eastern Europe Trophy was the fifth season of the TCR Eastern Europe Trophy.

== Calendar ==
The TCR Eastern Europe calendar was launched on November 4, 2022, and includes six events in five countries.

Rnd.		Circuit/Location	Date
1	1	Motorsport Arena Oschersleben, Oschersleben, Germany	8–9 April
1	2	Motorsport Arena Oschersleben, Oschersleben, Germany	8–9 April
2	3	Hungaroring, Budapest, Hungary	29–30 April
2	4	Hungaroring, Budapest, Hungary	29–30 April
3	5	Red Bull Ring, Spielberg, Austria	20–21 May
3	6	Red Bull Ring, Spielberg, Austria	20–21 May
4	7	Automotodróm Slovakia Ring, Orechová Potôň, Slovakia	9–10 June
4	8	Automotodróm Slovakia Ring, Orechová Potôň, Slovakia	9–10 June
5	9	Autodrom Most, Most, Czech Republic	5–6 August
5	10	Autodrom Most, Most, Czech Republic	5–6 August
6	11	Brno Circuit, Brno, Czech Republic	9–10 September
6	12	Brno Circuit, Brno, Czech Republic	9–10 September

== Teams and drivers ==
Team	Car	No.	Drivers	Class	Rounds	Ref.
(Slovakia) Aditis Racing	Audi RS 3 LMS TCR (2021)	1	(Poland) Bartosz Groszek		6	
(Slovakia) Aditis Racing	Audi RS 3 LMS TCR (2021)	22	(Czech Republic) Petr Fulín		5	
(Slovakia) Aditis Racing	Audi RS 3 LMS TCR (2021)	23	(Germany) Sebastian Steibel		1–4	
(Slovakia) Aditis Racing	Audi RS 3 LMS TCR (2021)	38	(Czech Republic) Radim Adámek		All	
(Slovakia) Aditis Racing	Audi RS 3 LMS TCR (2017)	25	(Austria) Tobias Poschik	J T	1–4	
(Slovenia) Lema Racing	Audi RS 3 LMS TCR (2021)	3	(Italy) Giacomo Ghermandi		All	
(Switzerland) Vuković Motorsport	Renault Mégane R.S TCR	4	(Switzerland) Milan Vuković	J	2–3	
(Switzerland) Vuković Motorsport	Renault Mégane R.S TCR	75	(Switzerland) Milenko Vuković		2–3	
(Austria) Wimmer Werk Motorsport	Audi RS 3 LMS TCR (2017)	5	(Austria) Peter Gross		3	
(Austria) Wimmer Werk Motorsport	Cupra León Competición TCR	71	(Austria) Philipp Dietrich	J	2–4	
(Austria) Wimmer Werk Motorsport	Cupra León Competición TCR	114	(Austria) Dominik Haselsteiner		3	
(Germany) Mertel Motorsport	Honda Civic Type R TCR (FK8)	8	(Germany) René Kircher	J	All	
(Germany) Mertel Motorsport	Honda Civic Type R TCR (FK8)	9	(Georgia (country)) Davit Kajaia		All	
(Czech Republic) Express Auto Racing	Cupra León Competición TCR	14	(Czech Republic) Petr Čížek		All	
(Czech Republic) Express Auto Racing	Cupra León Competición TCR	82	(Czech Republic) Vít Smejkal		2–5	
(Czech Republic) Fullín Race Academy	Cupra León Competición TCR	21	(Germany) Carol Wittke		1–2, 4–6	
(Czech Republic) Fullín Race Academy	Cupra León Competición TCR	22	(Czech Republic) Petr Fulín		1	
(Czech Republic) Fullín Race Academy	Cupra León Competición TCR	96	(Czech Republic) Petr Fulín Jr.		2–6	
(Austria) RTM Motorsport	Honda Civic Type R TCR (FK8)	24	(Switzerland) Antonio Citera	T	1, 3–5	
(Austria) 78 Racing-Team	Honda Civic Type R TCR (FK8)	24	(Switzerland) Antonio Citera	T	6	
(Czech Republic) Janik Motorsport	Hyundai Elantra N TCR	32	(Poland) Carlo Czepiel	J	All	
(Czech Republic) Janik Motorsport	Hyundai Elantra N TCR	68	(Czech Republic) Adam Kout		All	
(Czech Republic) Janik Motorsport	Hyundai Elantra N TCR	70	(Slovakia) Mat'o Homola		All	
(Hungary) M1RA	Hyundai i30 N TCR	33	(Hungary) Attila Bucsi	J T	6	
(Poland) Basenhurt A&T Racing	Audi RS3 LMS TCR (2017)	34	(Poland) Adam Rzepecki	T	1–4	
(Poland) Honda Wyszomirski Racing	Honda Civic Type R TCR (FK8)	55	(Poland) Sebastian Kolakowski	T	All	
(Croatia) Auto Klub Dubrovnik Racing	Cupra León Competición TCR	74	(Croatia) Žarko Knego		1–3	
(Croatia) Auto Klub Dubrovnik Racing	Hyundai Elantra N TCR	74	(Croatia) Žarko Knego		4–6	
(Lithuania) LV Racing	Audi RS3 LMS TCR (2021)	121	(Latvia) Ivars Vallers		All	

== Results ==
Rnd.		Circuit	Pole position	Fastest lap	Winning driver	Winning team	Winning Junior driver	Winning Trophy driver
1	1	Motorsport Arena Oschersleben, Oschersleben, Germany	(Czech Republic) Petr Fulín	(Czech Republic) Adam Kout	(Slovakia) Mat'o Homola	(Czech Republic) Janik Motorsport	(Poland) Carlo Czepiel	(Austria) Tobias Poschik
1	2	Motorsport Arena Oschersleben, Oschersleben, Germany		(Poland) Carlo Czepiel	(Poland) Carlo Czepiel	(Czech Republic) Janik Motorsport	(Poland) Carlo Czepiel	(Austria) Tobias Poschik
2	3	Hungaroring, Budapest, Hungary	(Slovakia) Mat'o Homola	(Switzerland) Milan Vuković	(Switzerland) Milan Vuković	(Switzerland) Vuković Motorsport	(Switzerland) Milan Vuković	(Austria) Tobias Poschik
2	4	Hungaroring, Budapest, Hungary		(Germany) René Kircher	(Germany) René Kircher	(Germany) Mertel Motorsport	(Germany) René Kircher	(Austria) Tobias Poschik
3	5	Red Bull Ring, Spielberg, Austria	(Switzerland) Milan Vuković	(Switzerland) Milan Vuković	(Switzerland) Milan Vuković	(Switzerland) Vuković Motorsport	(Switzerland) Milan Vuković	(Austria) Tobias Poschik
3	6	Red Bull Ring, Spielberg, Austria		(Germany) René Kircher	(Georgia (country)) Davit Kajaia	(Germany) Mertel Motorsport	(Germany) René Kircher	(Austria) Tobias Poschik
4	7	Automotodróm Slovakia Ring, Orechová Potôň, Slovakia	(Germany) René Kircher	(Slovakia) Mat'o Homola	(Slovakia) Mat'o Homola	(Czech Republic) Janik Motorsport	(Poland) Carlo Czepiel	(Austria) Tobias Poschik
4	8	Automotodróm Slovakia Ring, Orechová Potôň, Slovakia		(Czech Republic) Adam Kout	(Slovakia) Mat'o Homola	(Czech Republic) Janik Motorsport	(Austria) Philipp Dietrich	(Poland) Adam Rzepecki
5	9	Autodrom Most, Most, Czech Republic	(Czech Republic) Petr Fulín	(Czech Republic) Petr Fulín	(Czech Republic) Petr Fulín	(Slovakia) Aditis Racing	(Germany) Rene Kircher	(Switzerland) Antonio Citera
5	10	Autodrom Most, Most, Czech Republic		(Slovakia) Mat'o Homola	(Czech Republic) Adam Kout	(Czech Republic) Janik Motorsport	(Poland) Carlo Czepiel	(Switzerland) Antonio Citera
6	11	Brno Circuit, Brno, Czech Republic	(Hungary) Attila Bucsi	(Hungary) Attila Bucsi	(Hungary) Attila Bucsi	(Hungary) M1RA	(Hungary) Attila Bucsi	(Hungary) Attila Bucsi
6	12	Brno Circuit, Brno, Czech Republic		(Germany) René Kircher	(Germany) René Kircher	(Germany) Mertel Motorsport	(Germany) René Kircher	(Hungary) Attila Bucsi

=== Drivers' standings ===
Scoring system

Position	**1st**	**2nd**	**3rd**	**4th**	**5th**	**6th**	**7th**	**8th**	**9th**	**10th**	Fastest lap
Qualifying	3	2	1	—N/a							
Race	25	18	15	12	10	8	6	4	2	1	1

Pos.	Driver	OSH (Germany)		HUN (Hungary)		RBR (Austria)		SVK (Slovakia)		MOS (Czech Republic)		BRN (Czech Republic)		Pts.
Pos.	Driver	R1	R2	R1	R2	R1	R2	R1	R2	R1	R2	R1	R2	Pts.
1	(Slovakia) Mat'o Homola	1^{3}	2	**4**^{1}	3	4	3	1^{2}	1	3	2	2^{2}	8	212
2	(Germany) René Kircher	4	6	2	1	2^{2}	4	**DSQ**^{1}	6	4	8	7	1	156
3	(Czech Republic) Adam Kout	3^{2}	4	5^{3}	4	13	7	4	7	5	1	4	2	143
4	(Georgia (country)) Davit Kajaia	5	7	3	2	7	1	2	3	9^{2}	4	16	16	129
5	(Poland) Carlo Czepiel	6	1	10^{2}	19	8	6	3^{3}	4	8	5	5	4	113
6	(Italy) Giacomo Ghermandi	13	11	8	12	5	5	5	9	7	3	6	5	75
7	(Switzerland) Milan Vukovic			1	5	**1**^{1}	21							65
8	(Czech Republic) Petr Fulín	**2**^{1}	5							**1**^{1}	Ret	DNS	WD	60
9	(Czech Republic) Petr Čížek	9	8	6	6	10	10	9	10	2^{3}	9	11	11	48
10	(Germany) Sebastian Steibel	7	9	7	10	6	2	Ret	8					45
11	(Hungary) Attila Bucsi											**1**^{1}	6	37
12	(Czech Republic) Petr Fulin Jr.			12	13	14	12	7	5	6	6	9	9	36
13	(Austria) Tobias Poschik	8	3	11	9	11	8	6	Ret					33
14	(Austria) Philipp Dietrich			9	8	9	9	8	2					32
15	(Croatia) Žarko Knego	10	Ret	14	11	12	11	11	12	10	7	8	3	27
16	(Switzerland) Milenko Vukovic			DSQ	7	3^{3}	Ret							22
17	(Poland) Bartosz Groszek											3^{3}	7	22
18	(Germany) Carol Wittke	11	10	13	14			10	11	11	10	10	10	5
19	(Austria) Antonio Citera	15	12			16	15	15	DNS	15	11	12	15	0
20	(Latvia) Ivars Vallers	14	13	16	15	20	14	16	16	13	12	13	12	0
21	(Czech Republic) Radim Adámek	17	16	17	16	Ret	17	12	15	12	14			0
22	(Poland) Adam Rzepecki	12	14	19	Ret	17	13	17	13					0
23	(Poland) Sebastian Kolakowski	16	15	15	18	19	19	13	14	16	13	14	14	0
24	(Czech Republic) Vit Smejkal			18	17	18	16	14	17	14	15	15	13	0
25	(Austria) Dominik Haselsteiner					15	20							0
26	(Austria) Peter Gross					21	18							0
Pos.	Driver	OSH (Germany)		HUN (Hungary)		RBR (Austria)		SVK (Slovakia)		MOS (Czech Republic)		BRN (Czech Republic)		Pts.

Colour	Result
Gold	Winner
Silver	Second place
Bronze	Third place
Green	Points classification
Blue	Non-points classification
Blue	Non-classified finish (NC)
Purple	Retired, not classified (Ret)
Red	Did not qualify (DNQ)
Red	Did not pre-qualify (DNPQ)
Black	Disqualified (DSQ)
White	Did not start (DNS)
White	Withdrew (WD)
White	Race cancelled (C)
Blank	Did not practice (DNP)
Blank	Did not arrive (DNA)
Blank	Excluded (EX)

**Bold** – Pole

Italics – Fastest Lap

^{1 2 3} – Qualifying position

† – Drivers did not finish the race, but were classified as they completed over 70% of the race distance.
