= 2026 TCR Eastern Europe Touring Car Series =

2025 European motorsport season

The 2026 TCR Eastern Europe Touring Car Series was the eighth season of the TCR Eastern Europe. The season began on 15 May at Automotodrom Grobnik and ended on 25 October at the Hungaroring.

== Calendar ==
The 2026 calendar was announced on 29 October 2025. The season remains at five events, with two races per event except for the Salzburgring round, which will feature three races, for a total of eleven races.

Race 1 & 2 at Salzburgring & at the Slovakia Ring and Hungaroring were part of the Croatian National Championship

Rnd.		Circuit/Location	Date	Supporting Program
1	1	Automotodrom Grobnik, Čavle, Croatia	15–17 May	Grobnik Grand Prix; Clio Cup Bohemia; Austria Formula Cup; ~~GT Cup Series~~
1	2	Automotodrom Grobnik, Čavle, Croatia	15–17 May	Grobnik Grand Prix; Clio Cup Bohemia; Austria Formula Cup; ~~GT Cup Series~~
2	3	Salzburgring, Plainfeld, Austria	29–31 May	Formula 4 CEZ Championship; Clio Cup Bohemia
2	4	Salzburgring, Plainfeld, Austria	29–31 May	Formula 4 CEZ Championship; Clio Cup Bohemia
2	5	Salzburgring, Plainfeld, Austria	29–31 May	Formula 4 CEZ Championship; Clio Cup Bohemia
3	6	Autodrom Most, Most, Czech Republic	31 July–2 August	Formula 4 CEZ Championship; GT Cup Series; Clio Cup Bohemia
3	7	Autodrom Most, Most, Czech Republic	31 July–2 August	Formula 4 CEZ Championship; GT Cup Series; Clio Cup Bohemia
4	8	Automotodróm Slovakia Ring, Orechová Potôň, Slovakia	21–23 August	GT Cup Series; Wyścigowe Samochodowe Mistrzostwa Polski; Clio Cup Bohemia; Austria Formula Cup
4	9	Automotodróm Slovakia Ring, Orechová Potôň, Slovakia	21–23 August	GT Cup Series; Wyścigowe Samochodowe Mistrzostwa Polski; Clio Cup Bohemia; Austria Formula Cup
5	10	Hungaroring, Mogyoród, Hungary	23–25 October	Eurocup-3; Formula 4 CEZ Championship; Clio Cup Bohemia
5	11	Hungaroring, Mogyoród, Hungary	23–25 October	Eurocup-3; Formula 4 CEZ Championship; Clio Cup Bohemia

== Teams and drivers ==
Team	Car	No.	Drivers	Rounds	Ref.
(Slovenia) AMD Slovenija Avto	Audi RS 3 LMS TCR (2021)	2	(Slovenia) Robert Pravdič	1	
(Czech Republic) Hyundai / Janík Motorsport	Hyundai Elantra N TCR	11	(Czech Republic) Jiří Zbožínek	All	
(Czech Republic) Hyundai / Janík Motorsport	Hyundai Elantra N TCR	68	(Czech Republic) Adam Kout	All	
(Czech Republic) 76 Racing	Cupra León VZ TCR	14	(Czech Republic) Petr Čížek	1, 3–5	
(Czech Republic) Aditis Racing	Audi RS 3 LMS TCR (2021)	38	(Czech Republic) Radim Adámek	All	
(Czech Republic) Aditis Racing	Audi RS 3 LMS TCR (2021)	301	(Czech Republic) Martin Kadlečík	All	
(Croatia) AK Konavle	Hyundai Elantra N TCR (2024)	44	(Croatia) Niko Pulić	1	
(Croatia) Auto Klub Dubrovnik	Cupra León Competición TCR	46	(Croatia) Frano Dubreta	1	
(Croatia) Auto Klub Dubrovnik	Hyundai Elantra N TCR (2024)	74	(Croatia) Zarko Knego	All	
(Croatia) Auto Klub Dubrovnik	Hyundai i30 N TCR	703	(Croatia) Luka Fabijančić	1, 4–5	
(Serbia) Ahilej Racing	Hyundai Elantra N TCR	365	(Serbia) Nemanja Milovanović	5	
(Croatia) ASK Kastavac	Honda Civic Type R TCR (FK2)	701	(Croatia) Bojan Miljkovič	1	

== Results ==
Rnd.		Circuit	Pole position	Fastest lap	Winning driver	Winning team
1	1	(Croatia) Automotodrom Grobnik	(Czech Republic) Adam Kout	(Czech Republic) Martin Kadlečík	(Czech Republic) Martin Kadlečík	(Czech Republic) Aditis Racing
1	2	(Croatia) Automotodrom Grobnik		(Czech Republic) Martin Kadlečík	(Czech Republic) Martin Kadlečík	(Czech Republic) Aditis Racing
2	3	(Austria) Salzburgring	(Czech Republic) Adam Kout	(Czech Republic) Adam Kout	(Czech Republic) Adam Kout	(Czech Republic) Hyundai / Janík Motorsport
2	4	(Austria) Salzburgring		(Czech Republic) Adam Kout	(Czech Republic) Adam Kout	(Czech Republic) Hyundai / Janík Motorsport
2	5	(Austria) Salzburgring		(Czech Republic) Adam Kout	(Czech Republic) Martin Kadlečík	(Czech Republic) Aditis Racing
3	6	(Czech Republic) Autodrom Most	(Czech Republic) Adam Kout	(Czech Republic) Adam Kout	(Czech Republic) Martin Kadlečík	(Czech Republic) Aditis Racing
3	7	(Czech Republic) Autodrom Most		(Czech Republic) Martin Kadlečík	(Czech Republic) Martin Kadlečík	(Czech Republic) Aditis Racing
4	8	Automotodróm Slovakia Ring	(Czech Republic) Adam Kout	(Czech Republic) Adam Kout	(Czech Republic) Adam Kout	(Czech Republic) Hyundai / Janík Motorsport
4	9	Automotodróm Slovakia Ring		(Czech Republic) Adam Kout	(Czech Republic) Martin Kadlečík	(Czech Republic) Aditis Racing
5	10	(Hungary) Hungaroring	(Czech Republic) Adam Kout	(Czech Republic) Martin Kadlečík	(Czech Republic) Martin Kadlečík	(Czech Republic) Aditis Racing
5	11	(Hungary) Hungaroring		(Czech Republic) Adam Kout	(Czech Republic) Adam Kout	(Czech Republic) Hyundai / Janík Motorsport

== Drivers' standings ==
Scoring system

Position	**1st**	**2nd**	**3rd**	**4th**	**5th**	**6th**	**7th**	**8th**	**9th**	**10th**	Fastest lap
Qualifying	3	2	1	—N/a							
Race	25	18	15	12	10	8	6	4	2	1	1

Pos	Driver	GRO (Croatia)		SLZ (Austria)			MOS (Czech Republic)		SVK (Slovakia)		HUN (Hungary)		Pts.
Pos	Driver	R1	R2	R1	R2	R3	R1	R2	R1	R2	R1	R2	Pts.
1	(Czech Republic) Martin Kadlečík	1	1	2^{2}	5	1	1^{2}	1	Ret^{2}	1	1^{2}	2	233
2	(Czech Republic) Adam Kout	**Ret**^{1}	3	**1**^{1}	1	2	**2**^{1}	2	**1**^{1}	2	**2**^{1}	1	227
3	(Czech Republic) Jiří Zbožínek	3^{2}	4	3	3	4	Ret^{3}	3	2^{3}	Ret	3^{3}	3	145
4	(Croatia) Zarko Knego	4	2	Ret^{3}	2	3	4	4	3	4	WD	WD	115
5	(Czech Republic) Petr Čížek	2	5				3	5	4	3	WD	WD	80
6	(Czech Republic) Radim Adámek	10	9	4	4	5	5	6	5	DNS	WD	WD	65
7	(Serbia) Nemanja Milovanović										4	4	24
8	(Croatia) Luka Fabijančić	8	11						WD	WD	5	5	24
9	(Croatia) Niko Pulić	6	6										16
10	(Croatia) Frano Dubreta	5^{3}	10										12
11	(Croatia) Bojan Miljkovič	7	8										10
12	(Slovenia) Robert Pravdič	9	7										8
Pos	Driver	GRO (Croatia)		SLZ (Austria)			MOS (Czech Republic)		SVK (Slovakia)		HUN (Hungary)		Pts.

Colour	Result
Gold	Winner
Silver	Second place
Bronze	Third place
Green	Points classification
Blue	Non-points classification
Blue	Non-classified finish (NC)
Purple	Retired, not classified (Ret)
Red	Did not qualify (DNQ)
Red	Did not pre-qualify (DNPQ)
Black	Disqualified (DSQ)
White	Did not start (DNS)
White	Withdrew (WD)
White	Race cancelled (C)
Blank	Did not practice (DNP)
Blank	Did not arrive (DNA)
Blank	Excluded (EX)

**Bold** – Pole

Italics – Fastest Lap

^{1 2 3} – Qualifying position

† – Drivers did not finish the race, but were classified as they completed over 70% of the race distance.
