= Tatuus N.T07 =

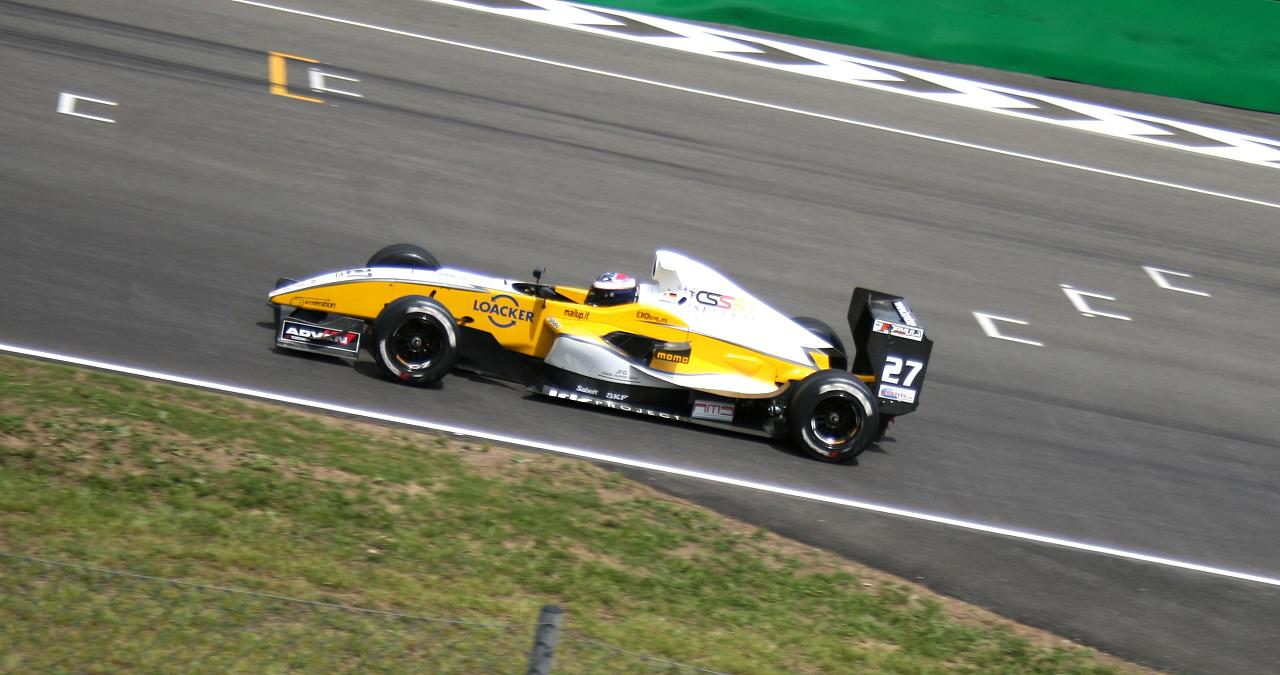
- Category: International Formula Master (2007-2010); Formula Master Italia (2008) see also: Current status
- Constructor: Tatuus; N.Technology

Technical specifications
- Chassis: carbon fibre monocoque
- Suspension (front): pushrod, height register with shim, single damper, aerodynamically-shaped wishbones
- Suspension (rear): pushrod, two dampers, aerodynamically-shaped wishbones
- Axle track: Front: 1550mm Rear: 1500mm
- Wheelbase: 2700mm
- Engine: Honda K20A 1,998 cc (121.9 cu in) N/A
- Transmission: Sadev 6-speed sequential
- Fuel: Panta
- Tyres: Yokohama; Front: 23/56-13; Rear: 28/58-13

Competition history
- Notable entrants: various
- Notable drivers: various

The Tatuus N.T07 (also known as the Formula S2000, Tatuus IFM or Formula N.T07) is a formula racecar designed by Tatuus for the International Formula Master.

== Technical ==
The car is designed by joined effort of Tatuus and N.Technology. N.Technology also created the International Formula Master. The car was designed to meet FIA Formula 3 safety standards. The chassis, bodywork and aerodynamic components are made out of carbon fibre. Most of the mechanical elements are constructed out of aluminium. The car features a Sadev 6-speed sequential gearbox.

=== Engine ===
The engine was based on a production Honda K20A engine. For the first season the engine was tuned by Heini Mader Racing. The engine meets FIA Super 2000 regulations, like the WTCC the IFM supports.

Specifications
Engine type	inline 4-cylinder
Material	Aluminium
Displacement	1,998cc
Horsepower	250 hp
ECU	Magneti Marelli MVL-381
Bore x Stroke	85mm x 85mm
Lubrication	Dry sump
Air intake chamber	carbon fibre airbox

=== Hybrid system ===
The car and engine were designed to allow a hybrid system in the future. The idea of a hybrid engine for the race series were formed in the early stages of development of the car. But in 2006 the hybrid technology was not well enough developed to be used in formula racing. The concept uses regenerative braking (a system like KERS in Formula 1). The stored energy would result in a 10% gain in engine performance and improved fuel consumption. The hybrid system remained in its concept phase.

== Competition history ==
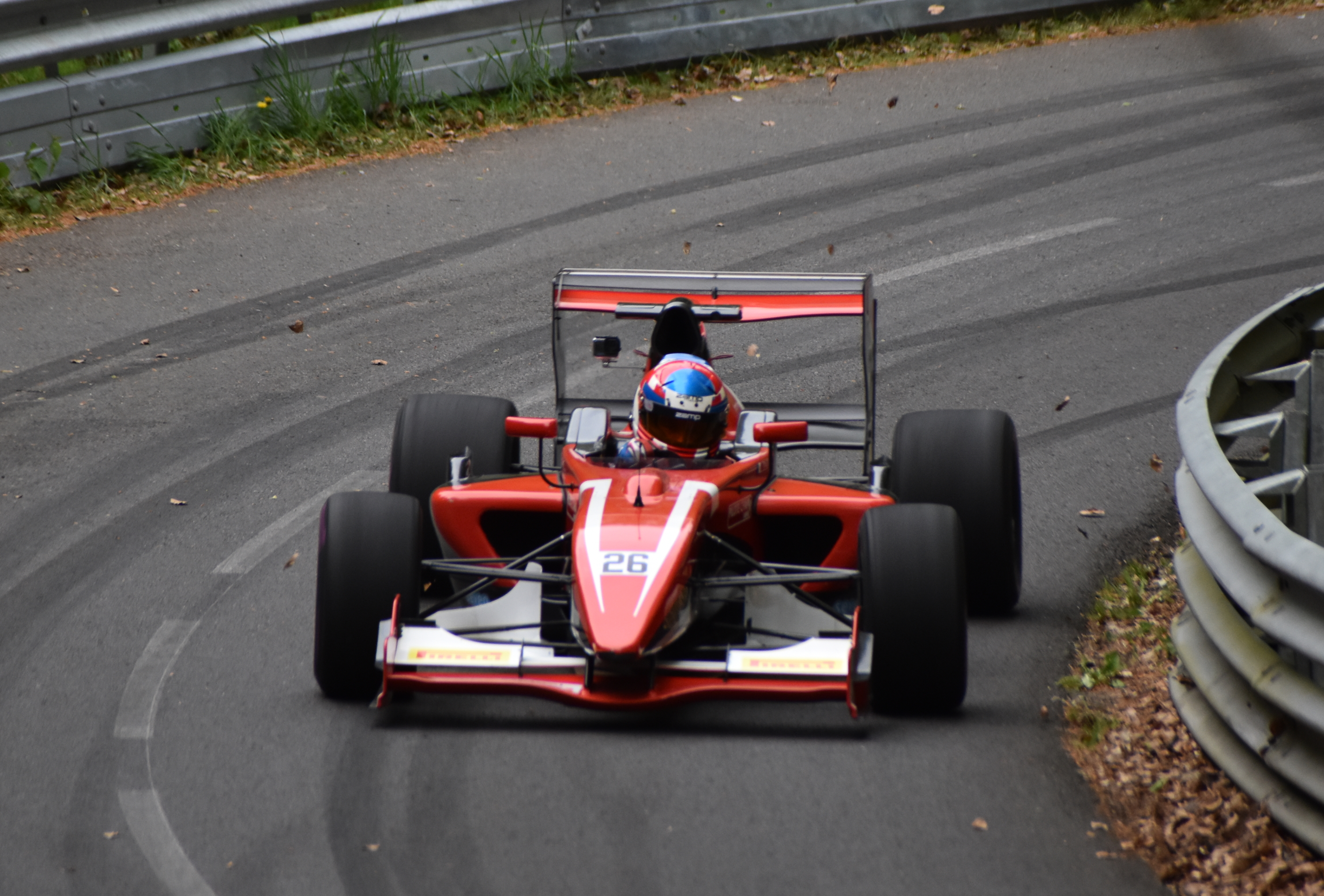
A Tatuus N.707 driven by Fabien Ponchant at the Abreschviller hillclimb in 2023

The cars first competitive outing was during preseason testing at Monza. Scuderia Fama driver Luca Persiani was fasted driver. During a demonstration run, before the first ever International Formula Master race, driver Bruno Senna crashed the car. There was significant damage to the car but Bruno Senna was unhurt. The final outing was during afterseason testing in 2009. At the Hungaroring Swede Philip Forsman drove the fastest time during the last testing session for AR Motorsport. Tatuus produced a total of 50 N.T07's.

=== Current status ===
After the dissolution of the International Formula Master the car was initially retired from racing. One of the cars was entered in the 2010 EuroBOSS Series season by Swiss driver Jean-Pierre Clement. The Tatuus N.T07 is a regular competitor in the V de V Single Seater Challenge where it competes against old and new Formula Renault 2.0 cars. The car is also seen in hillclimbing competitions in FIA Group E2.
