= 2010 EuroBOSS Series =

Motor race

2010 EuroBOSS Series season
Previous: 2009	Next: 2011

The 2010 EuroBOSS Series season was the tenth year of the EuroBOSS Series. The championship began on 8 August at Magny-Cours and was due to finish on 31 October at Portimão, after five double-header rounds. However, the last three race meetings were called off due to the lack of driver entries to the series. This meant the season ended with the Slovakiaring round on 22 August.

With two wins and two 2nd places from the four races held, Damien Charveriat won the EuroBOSS class at the wheel of his Zele Racing Dallara GP2/05 that had been formerly run in the GP2 Series. Andreas Zuber, himself a former GP2 racer, was the only other driver to compete in the class, winning both races at the Slovakiaring. As single entrants in the EuroBOSS Masters Class and the EuroBOSS Invitation Class respectively, Peter Milavec – double winner at the Slovakiaring – and Jean-Pierre Clement – one race win at Magny-Cours – won their classes unopposed. The EuroBOSS 3000 Class had the most competitors over the season, with four drivers competing in the two meetings. Gerhard Hille finished as the class winner, taking a win and two 2nd places to beat Norbert Groer by ten points.

== Drivers ==
#	Name	Team	Car	Series
11	(Switzerland) Jean-Pierre Clement		Tatuus N.T07 (Honda)	International Formula Master
18	(France) Damien Charveriat	Zele Racing	Dallara GP2/05 (Renault)	GP2 Series
19	(United Arab Emirates) Andreas Zuber	Zele Racing	Dallara GP2/05 (Renault)	GP2 Series
21	(Austria) Peter Milavec		Lola T92/50 (Cosworth)	International Formula 3000
22	(Portugal) Carlos Antunes Tavares		Dallara T02 (Nissan)	World Series by Nissan
23	(France) Christopher Brenier		Dallara SN01 (Nissan)	World Series by Nissan
33	(Austria) Norbert Groer		Dallara T05 (Nissan)	World Series by Nissan
35	(Austria) Gerhard Hille		Dallara T05 (Nissan)	World Series by Nissan

== Race calendar ==
The calendar consisted of five double-header meetings.

Round		Circuit	Country	Date	Pole position	Fastest lap	Winning driver
1	R1	Circuit de Nevers Magny-Cours	France	8 August	(France) Damien Charveriat	(France) Damien Charveriat	(France) Damien Charveriat
1	R2	Circuit de Nevers Magny-Cours	France	8 August	(France) Damien Charveriat	(France) Damien Charveriat	(France) Damien Charveriat
2	R1	Slovakiaring	Slovakia	22 August	(United Arab Emirates) Andreas Zuber	(United Arab Emirates) Andreas Zuber	(United Arab Emirates) Andreas Zuber
2	R2	Slovakiaring	Slovakia	22 August	(United Arab Emirates) Andreas Zuber	(United Arab Emirates) Andreas Zuber	(United Arab Emirates) Andreas Zuber
3	R1	Mondello Park	Ireland	12 September	Race meetings cancelled due to a lack of entries		
3	R2	Mondello Park	Ireland	12 September	Race meetings cancelled due to a lack of entries		
4	R1	Masaryk Circuit	Czech Republic	10 October	Race meetings cancelled due to a lack of entries		
4	R2	Masaryk Circuit	Czech Republic	10 October	Race meetings cancelled due to a lack of entries		
5	R1	Autódromo Internacional do Algarve	Portugal	31 October	Race meetings cancelled due to a lack of entries		
5	R2	Autódromo Internacional do Algarve	Portugal	31 October	Race meetings cancelled due to a lack of entries		
