= Aprilia RS457 =

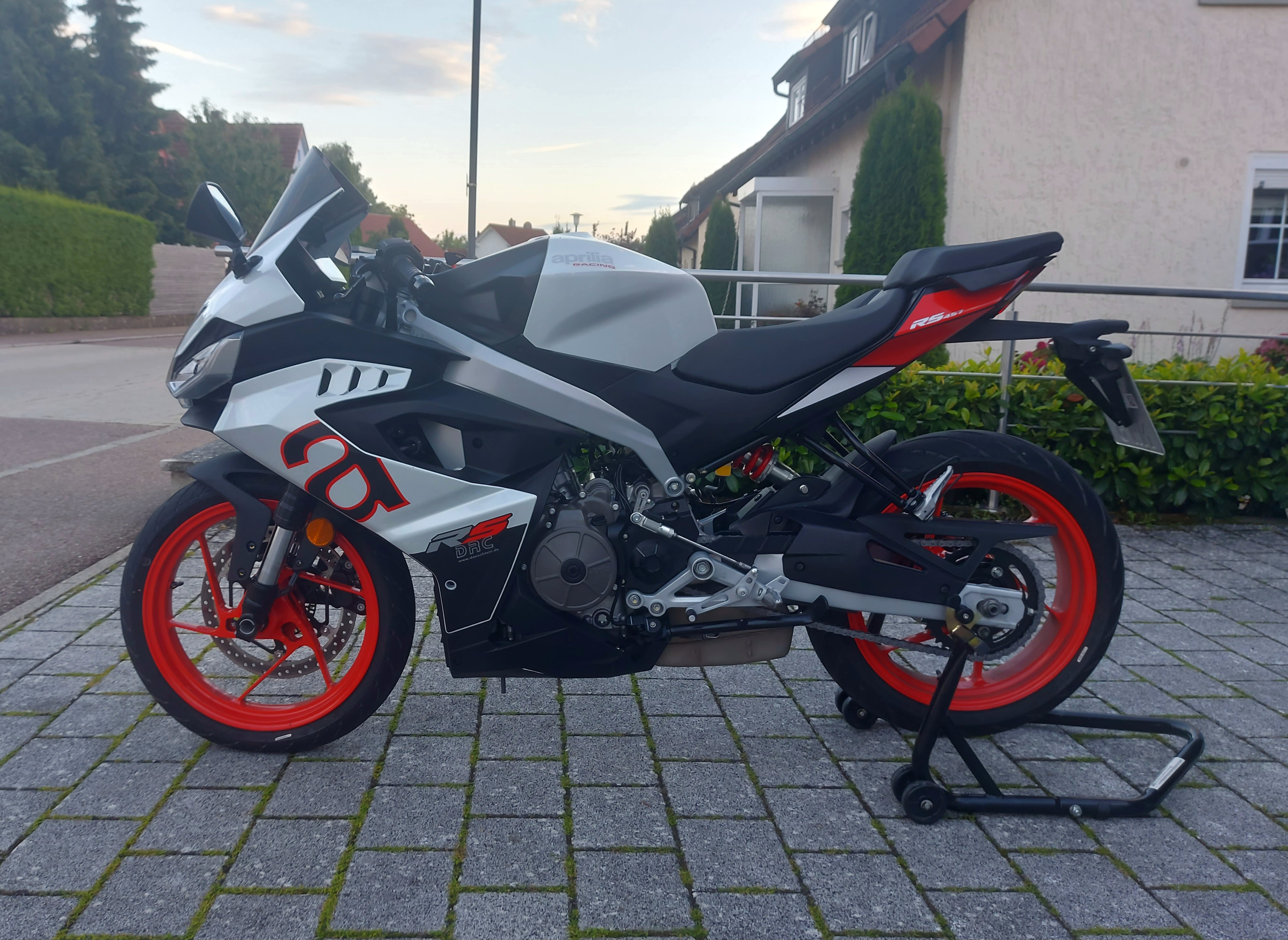
- Manufacturer: Aprilia
- Parent company: Piaggio
- Production: 2023-present
- Class: Sport bike
- Engine: 457 cc (27.9 cu in) double cylinder four-stroke engine
- Bore / stroke: 69.0 mm × 61.1 mm (2.72 in × 2.41 in)
- Power: 47.6 PS (35.0 kW) @ 9400 RPM
- Torque: 43.5 N⋅m (32.1 lbf⋅ft) @ 6700 RPM
- Transmission: 6 speed
- Suspension: Front : 41 mm (1.6 in) upside down hydraulic fork. Wheel travel 120 mm (4.7 in); Rear : Cast aluminium box section swingarm with asymmetric members. Hydraulic monoshock with adjustable spring preload. Wheel travel 130 mm.
- Brakes: 4 piston caliper with 320mm disc front; 2 piston caliper with 220mm disc rear.
- Tires: Tubeless radial. Front 110/70 17 in (430 mm) by 3 in (76 mm); Rear 150/60 17 in (430 mm) by 4.5 in (110 mm).
- Seat height: 800 mm (31 in)
- Weight: 350 lb (160 kg) (dry); 175 kg (386 lb) (wet)
- Fuel capacity: 13 L (2.9 imp gal; 3.4 US gal)
- Related: Aprilia RS660

The Aprilia RS457 is a sports motorcycle powered by a liquid cooled twin-cylinder four-stroke engine, and produced since late 2023.

== Design ==
The RS457 benefits from an aluminium perimeter frame, with the engine being structural to the chassis, like its sibling the RS660.
