= TCR Eastern Europe Touring Car Series =

Eastern European motorsport event

- Category: Touring cars
- Country: Eastern Europe
- Inaugural season: 2019
- Tyre suppliers: Kumho
- Drivers' champion: (Czech Republic) Adam Kout
- Teams' champion: (Czech Republic) Janik Motorsport
- Official website: https://easterneurope.tcr-series.com/

The TCR Eastern Europe is an annual touring car racing event that is held at various locations across Eastern Europe.

WSC Ltd and Race Event Management signed an agreement, to create the TCR Eastern Europe Trophy. The trophy is only eligible for teams and drivers from Eastern Europe. For 2019, they shared two events with TCR Europe Touring Car Series as well as having four events as part of the ESET V4 Cup.

== Circuits ==
- **Bold** denotes a circuit will be used in the 2026 season.

Number	Circuits	Rounds	Years
1	**Slovakia Ring**	8 (Note: Automotodróm Slovakia Ring hosted 2 rounds in 2021.)	2019–present
2	(Czech Republic) Brno Circuit	6	2019–2021, 2023–2025
3	(Hungary) **Hungaroring**	5	2019–2023, 2026
3	(Austria) Red Bull Ring	5	2019, 2022–2025
5	(Croatia) **Automotodrom Grobnik**	4	2019–2022, 2026
5	(Czech Republic) **Autodrom Most**	4	2022–present
7	(Poland) Tor Poznań	2	2021–2022
7	(Hungary) Balaton Park Circuit	2	2024–2025
7	(Austria) **Salzburgring**	2	2024–present
10	(Italy) Monza Circuit	1	2019
10	(Germany) Motorsport Arena Oschersleben	1	2023

== Champions ==
Year	Champion (Car)		Team Champions (Car)	
2019	(Serbia) Milovan Vesnić	Audi RS 3 LMS TCR	(Serbia) ASK Vesnić	Audi RS 3 LMS TCR
2020	(Serbia) Dušan Borković	Hyundai i30 N TCR	(Hungary) M1RA	Hyundai i30 N TCR
2021	(Czech Republic) Michal Makeš	CUPRA León TCR	(Czech Republic) Fullín Race Academy	CUPRA León Competición TCR
2022	(Poland) Bartosz Groszek	Audi RS 3 LMS TCR	(Czech Republic) Hyundai / Janik Motorsport	Hyundai i30 N TCR / Hyundai Elantra N TCR
2023	(Slovakia) Mat'o Homola	Hyundai Elantra N TCR	(Czech Republic) Hyundai / Janik Motorsport	Hyundai Elantra N TCR
2024	(Slovakia) Mat'o Homola	Hyundai Elantra N TCR	(Czech Republic) Hyundai / Janik Motorsport	Hyundai Elantra N TCR
2025	(Czech Republic) Adam Kout	Hyundai Elantra N TCR (2024)	(Czech Republic) Hyundai / Janik Motorsport	Hyundai Elantra N TCR (2024)
