= Automotodrom Grobnik =

Motorsport race track in Rijeka, Croatia

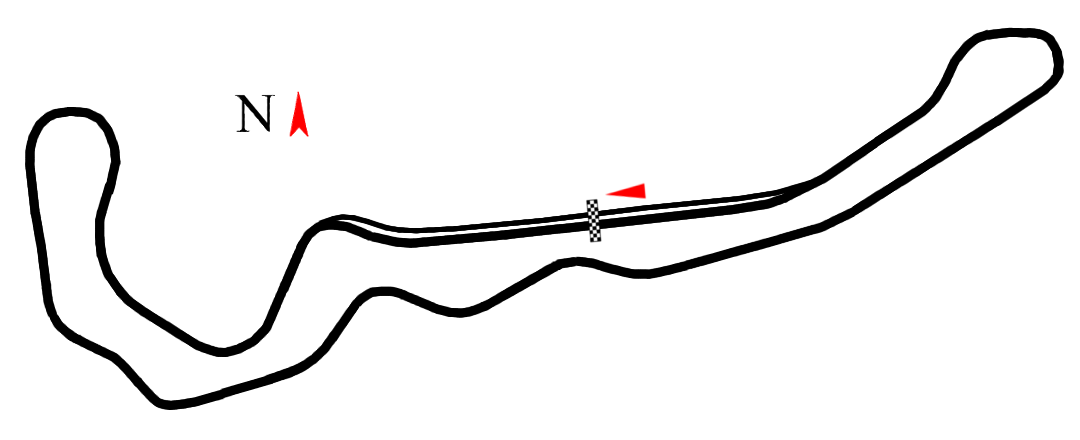
- Grand Prix Circuit (1978–present)
- Location: Čavle, Croatia
- Coordinates: 45°22′54″N 14°30′31″E
- FIA Grade: 4
- Owner: Automotodrom Grobnik d.o.o.
- Operator: Auto Moto Club Kvarner Rijeka
- Broke ground: June 1977; 48 years ago
- Opened: 14 September 1978; 47 years ago
- Major events: Current: Sidecar World Championship (1980, 1990, 1997–1998, 2005–2019, 2021–2022, 2026); TCR Eastern Europe (2019–2022, 2026); Austria Formula Cup (1999–2001, 2026); Alpe Adria International Motorcycle Championship (2011–present); Former: Grand Prix motorcycle racing Yugoslavian motorcycle Grand Prix (1978–1990); NASCAR Whelen Euro Series (2020–2022); Italian GT (1997, 2000); Interserie (1999–2000); Formula 750 (1979)
- Website: https://grobnik.hr/

Grand Prix Circuit (1978–present)
- Surface: Asphalt
- Length: 4.168 km (2.590 mi)
- Turns: 18
- Race lap record: 1:16.388 ( (Austria) Josef Neuhauser, Minardi M190, 2000, Interserie/F1)

Automotodrom Grobnik is a 4.168 km (2.590 mi) motorsport race track located in Grobnik, Croatia, about 10 km (6.2 mi) north of Rijeka. The circuit was built in 15 months and was opened in 14 September 1978. From 1978 to 1990, it hosted the Yugoslavian motorcycle Grand Prix of Grand Prix motorcycle racing. The circuit was renovated between December 2017 and April 2018.

Currently, among other competitions, the automotodrom hosts the Croatia Prix (Croatian: Nagrada Hrvatske), which is a valid race for the FIA CEZ Formula 3 and Circuit Championships.

In 2020, Rijeka also hosted NASCAR Whelen Euro Series rounds as a late replacement for Autodrom Most, whose round was cancelled late in the season due to COVID-19 restrictions. It has featured on the NASCAR Whelen Euro Series calendar also in 2021 and 2022.

== Events ==
Current

- May: Sidecar World Championship, Austria Formula Cup Nagrada Hrvatske, TCR Eastern Europe Touring Car Series, GT Cup Series, Alpe Adria International Motorcycle Championship
- June: Histo-Cup Austria Summer Race Rijeka/Grobnik
- September: Porsche Sprint Challenge Central Europe

Former

- ACCR Formula 4 Trophy (2022)
- Formula 750 (1979)
- Grand Prix motorcycle racing
  - Yugoslavian motorcycle Grand Prix (1978–1990)
- Interserie (1999–2000)
- Italian GT Championship (1997, 2000)
- NASCAR Whelen Euro Series
  - NASCAR GP Croatia (2020–2022)

== World Championship races ==
Period	Competition	Class	No. of races
1978–1990 (13)	Grand Prix motorcycle racing (Yugoslavian motorcycle Grand Prix)	50cc	6
1978–1990 (13)	Grand Prix motorcycle racing (Yugoslavian motorcycle Grand Prix)	80cc	7
1978–1990 (13)	Grand Prix motorcycle racing (Yugoslavian motorcycle Grand Prix)	125cc	13
1978–1990 (13)	Grand Prix motorcycle racing (Yugoslavian motorcycle Grand Prix)	250cc	13
1978–1990 (13)	Grand Prix motorcycle racing (Yugoslavian motorcycle Grand Prix)	350cc	6
1978–1990 (13)	Grand Prix motorcycle racing (Yugoslavian motorcycle Grand Prix)	500cc	12
1980, 1990, 1997–1998, 2005–2019, 2021–2022 (21)	FIM Sidecar World Championship		21

== Lap records ==
As of May 2026, the fastest official race lap records at the Automotodrom Grobnik are listed as:

Category	Time	Driver	Vehicle	Event
Grand Prix Circuit (1978–present): 4.168 km (2.590 mi)
Interserie/F1	1:16.388	Josef Neuhauser	Minardi M190	2000 Rijeka Interserie round
Formula Three	1:17.732	Paolo Brajnik	Dallara F318	2020 Rijeka FIA CEZ F3 round
GT3	1:21.705	Marcin Jedlinski	Audi R8 LMS GT3 Evo	2018 Rijeka FIA CEZ Circuit Endurance Championship round
Formula Regional	1:22.932	Karl-Heinz Matzinger	Tatuus F3 T-318	2026 Rijeka Austria Formula Cup round
Superbike	1:23.571	Yari Montella	Ducati Panigale V4 R	2026 Rijeka Alpe Adria Superbike round
Porsche Carrera Cup	1:23.848	Florian Janits	Porsche 911 (992 I) GT3 Cup	2023 Rijeka Porsche Sprint Challenge Central Europe round
Formula 4	1:24.039	Benjámin Berta	Tatuus F4-T014	2021 Nagrada Hrvatske
CN	1:25.320	Jacek Zielonka	Radical SR8	2021 Rijeka FIA CEZ Circuit Championship round
Supersport	1:28.031	Martin Vugrinec	Yamaha YZF-R6	2021 1st Rijeka Alpe Adria Supersport round
Stock car racing	1:28.508	Alon Day	Chevrolet Camaro NASCAR	2020 Rijeka NASCAR Whelen Euro Series round
500cc	1:29.220	Wayne Rainey	Yamaha YZR500	1990 Yugoslavian motorcycle Grand Prix
TCR Touring Car	1:30.119	Martin Kadlecik	Audi RS 3 LMS TCR (2021)	2026 Rijeka TCR Eastern Europe round
250cc	1:31.952	Reinhold Roth	Honda NSR250	1990 Yugoslavian motorcycle Grand Prix
Sportbike	1:32.897	Daniel Turecek	Aprilia RS660 Factory	2026 Rijeka Alpe Adria Sportbike round
350cc	1:36.900	Anton Mang	Kawasaki KR350	1981 Yugoslavian motorcycle Grand Prix
Supersport 300	1:37.869	Maxim Repak	Kawasaki Ninja 400	2019 Rijeka Alpe Adria Supersport 300 round
125cc	1:38.076	Doriano Romboni	Honda RS125R	1990 Yugoslavian motorcycle Grand Prix
GT2	1:38.131	Alex Dazzan	Porsche 911 Carrera RSR 3.8	1997 Rijeka Italian GT round
Renault Clio Cup	1:38.936	Michal Makes	Renault Clio R.S. IV	2018 Rijeka FIA CEZ Circuit Championship round
Super 1600	1:44.329	Dušan Kouril	Fiat Punto S1600	2018 Rijeka FIA CEZ Circuit Championship round
50cc	1:49.980	Ricardo Tormo	Garelli 50cc GP	1983 Yugoslavian motorcycle Grand Prix

== See also ==
- Preluk Circuit
