= Salzburgring =

Racing track in Austria

- Grand Prix Circuit (1998–present)
- Location: Plainfeld, Austria
- Coordinates: 47°49′16″N 013°09′34″E
- FIA Grade: 3
- Broke ground: 1968
- Opened: September 1969; 57 years ago
- Major events: Current: ADAC GT Masters (2025–2026); TCR Eastern Europe (2024–present); Formula 4 CEZ (2024–present); Former: Grand Prix motorcycle racing Austrian motorcycle Grand Prix (1971–1979, 1981–1991, 1993–1994); WTCC Race of Austria (2012–2014); TCR Europe (2024); World SBK (1995); Sidecar World Championship (1971–1979, 1981–1991, 2005–2007); TCR International (2015–2017); European Touring Car Cup (2008, 2010–2014); ETCC (1970–1981, 1983–1985); Formula Two (1972–1976); Formula 5000 (1970)
- Website: https://salzburgring.com/

Grand Prix Circuit (1998–present)
- Length: 4.241 km (2.635 mi)
- Turns: 15
- Race lap record: 1:16.843 ( (Malaysia) Akash Nandy, Dallara F308, 2015, F3)

Motorcycle Circuit (1986–1997)
- Length: 4.255 km (2.644 mi)
- Turns: 15
- Race lap record: 1:17.896 ( (Australia) Mick Doohan, Honda NSR500, 1994, 500cc)

Grand Prix Circuit (1976–1997)
- Length: 4.246 km (2.638 mi)
- Turns: 13
- Race lap record: 1:12.450 ( (Italy) Vittorio Brambilla, Alfa Romeo 33SC12, 1977, Group 6)

Grand Prix Circuit (1969–1975)
- Length: 4.238 km (2.633 mi)
- Turns: 11
- Race lap record: 1:10.500 ( (United Kingdom) Peter Gethin, McLaren M10B, 1970, F5000)

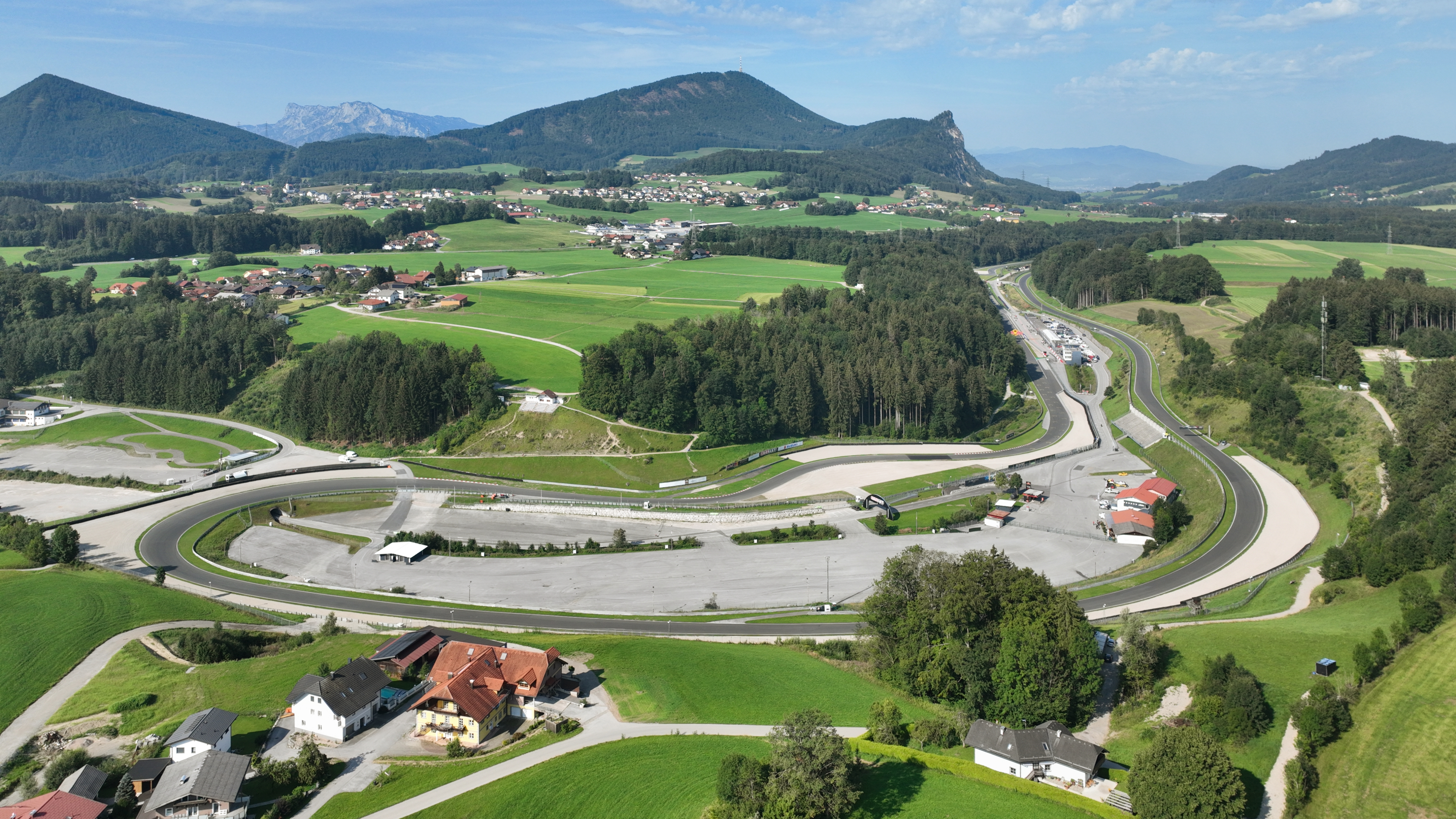
East-northeast view of the Salzburgring

The Salzburgring is a 4.241 km (2.635 mi) motorsport race track located in Plainfeld, east of Salzburg.

== Key facts ==
Track Length 4.241 km (2.635 mi)

Bends 15

Straights 4 (the longest being at start/finish which is 750m)

Incline maximum 3,8%

Decline maximum 1,8%

Altitude difference ca 25 m (82 ft)

Altitude 648.3 m (2,127 ft) to 670.6 m (2,200 ft)

Boxes 31

== History ==
1968 Groundbreaking ceremony

1969 Opening with a combined car and motorbike race

1970 First Grand Prix of Austria for Motorbikes

1971 First FIM Motorbike World Championship race

2012–2014 Touring Car World Championships

2013 First Electric Love Festival which, in 2018, brought 180,000 attendees to the track

2019 50th Anniversary

The race track was first opened in 1969. Lying in a narrow, alpine valley, it has a rather simple layout, with two long straights plus the sweeping and fast "Fahrerlagerkurve" ("paddock turn") at the bottom, and the narrow "Nockstein-Kehre" on the top. In spite of its simple layout, it garnered a fearsome reputation for the high speeds reached on the straights and the "Fahrerlagerkurve". Michael Doohan describes the section between 7 and 10 as his all time favorite piece of racetrack, likening it to "threading a motorcycle through the eye of a needle at 290 km/h (180 mph) whilst banging fairings with your competitors with armco barriers on each side". He continues "Sure it was fast and dangerous, but also enormous fun. To me it's what motorcycle racing is all about".

The Salzburgring track hosts touring car races like the German ADAC Procar Series, Deutsche Produktionswagen Meisterschaft, Deutsche Tourenwagen Challenge, Super Tourenwagen Cup and the European Touring Car Championship. It was also the home of the Austrian motorcycle Grand Prix from 1971 to 1994, except for the 1980 and 1992 seasons. Giacomo Agostini and Angel Nieto are the all-time leaders in motorcycle Grand Prix victories at the circuit, with six wins apiece. Sidecar motorcycle races were also held at the venue. The track has also hosted the Oldtimer Grand Prix as well as during the last years a "Rupert Hollaus Memorial" organized by Ex-Grand Prix motorcycle and sidecar racer, Wolfgang Stropek. In 2008, the circuit played host to the then one-off European Touring Car Cup, with the event being won by Michel Nykjaer.

=== Layout history ===
Original Grand Prix Circuit (1969–1975)

Grand Prix Circuit (1976–1997)

Motorcycling Circuit (1986–1997)

Grand Prix Circuit (1998–present)

== Events ==
Current

- May: TCR Eastern Europe Touring Car Series Rundstrecken Trophy Salzburgring, Formula 4 CEZ Championship
- September: ADAC GT Masters Salzburgring Motorsportfestival, Histo-Cup Austria Heimrennen am Salzburgring, ADAC Tourenwagen Junior Cup

Former

- ADAC TCR Germany Touring Car Championship (2022)
- Deutsche Rennsport Meisterschaft (1979–1982)
- Deutsche Tourenwagen Meisterschaft (1987)
- European Formula 5000 Championship (1970)
- European Formula Two Championship (1972–1976)
- European Superbike Championship (1990–1991, 1995)
- European Touring Car Championship (1970–1981, 1983–1985)
- European Touring Car Cup (2008, 2010–2014)
- Formula 750 (1977)
- Formula Renault 2.0 Northern European Cup (2006)
- Formula Renault 2000 Germany (1997, 1999, 2001–2004)
- Formula Volkswagen Germany (2001–2003)
- German Formula Three Championship (1972, 1974, 1981–1982, 1984–1986, 1988, 1997–1999, 2006)
- Grand Prix motorcycle racing
  - Austrian motorcycle Grand Prix (1971–1979, 1981–1991, 1993–1994)
- Porsche Carrera Cup Germany (1987–1989, 1993, 1999)
- SEAT León Eurocup (2014)
- Sidecar World Championship (1971–1979, 1981–1991, 2005–2007)
- Super Tourenwagen Cup (1994–1999)
- Superbike World Championship (1995)
- TCR Europe Touring Car Series (2024)
- TCR International Series (2015–2017)
- V8Star Series (2001–2002)
- World Sportscar Championship (1976–1977)
- World Touring Car Championship
  - FIA WTCC Race of Austria (2012–2014)

== Lap records ==
As of September 2026, the fastest official race lap records at the Salzburgring are listed as:

Category	Time	Driver	Vehicle	Event
Grand Prix Circuit (1998–present): 4.241 km (2.635 mi)
Formula Three	1:16.843	Akash Nandy	Dallara F308	2015 Salzburgring Austria F3 Cup round
GT3	1:17.755	Finn Zulauf	Lamborghini Huracán GT3 Evo 2	2026 Salzburgring ADAC GT Masters round
Porsche Carrera Cup	1:20.422	Colin Bönighausen	Porsche 911 (992 I) GT3 Cup	2023 Salzburgring Porsche Sprint Challenge Central Europe round
Formula 4	1:21.193	Elia Weiss	Tatuus F4-T421	2026 Salzburgring Formula 4 CEZ round
Formula Renault 2.0	1:21.235	Alexander Geier	Tatuus FR2.0	2026 Salzburgring Formula Renault 2.0
TC1	1:22.571	José María López	Citroën C-Elysée WTCC	2014 FIA WTCC Race of Austria
Formula Volkswagen	1:22.777	Walter Lechner Jr.	Reynard Formula Volkswagen	2002 Salzburgring Formula Volkswagen Germany round
V8Star Series	1:24.774	Robert Lechner	V8Star car	2002 Salzburgring V8Star round
TCR Touring Car	1:24.868	Adam Kout	Hyundai Elantra N TCR	2026 Salzburgring TCR Eastern Europe round
Super Touring	1:24.922	Christian Abt	Audi A4 STW	1998 Salzburgring STW Cup round
GT4	1:26.833	Edwin Waldhier	Porsche 718 Cayman GT4 Clubsport	2020 Salzburgring Porsche Sprint Challenge Central Europe round
Super 2000	1:26.875	Yvan Muller	Chevrolet Cruze 1.6T	2013 FIA WTCC Race of Austria
SEAT León Supercopa	1:27.701	Pol Rosell	SEAT León Cup Racer	2014 Salzburgring SEAT León Eurocup round
Renault Clio Cup	1:36.464	Tomáš Pekar	Renault Clio R.S. V	2026 Salzburgring Clio Cup Bohemia round
Super 1600	1:39.637	Jens Löhnig	Ford Fiesta 1.6 16V	2010 Salzburgring ETC round
Motorcycle Circuit (1986–1997): 4.255 km (2.644 mi)
500cc	1:17.896	Mick Doohan	Honda NSR500	1994 Austrian motorcycle Grand Prix
World SBK	1:20.147	Carl Fogarty	Ducati 916 R	1995 Salzburgring World SBK round
250cc	1:20.916	Loris Capirossi	Honda NSR250	1994 Austrian motorcycle Grand Prix
Sidecar (B2A)	1:25.149	Ralph Bohnhorst	Bohnhorst	1991 Austrian motorcycle Grand Prix
125cc	1:28.950	Dirk Raudies	Honda RS125R	1994 Austrian motorcycle Grand Prix
80cc	1:38.280	Ian McConnachie	Krauser 80	1986 Austrian motorcycle Grand Prix
Grand Prix Circuit (1976–1997): 4.246 km (2.638 mi)
Group 6	1:12.450	Vittorio Brambilla	Alfa Romeo 33SC12	1977 Salzburgring Elan Trophae
Group 5	1:13.620	Manfred Winkelhock	Porsche 935J	1980 Salzburgring DRM round
Formula Three	1:13.684	Timo Scheider	Dallara F397	1997 Salzburgring German F3 round
Formula Two	1:14.950	René Arnoux	Martini MK19	1976 Salzburgring F2 round
500cc	1:17.420	Christian Sarron	Yamaha YZR500	1985 Austrian motorcycle Grand Prix
Super Touring	1:19.243	Laurent Aïello	Peugeot 406	1997 Salzburgring STW Cup round
Group N	1:22.610	Kris Nissen	BMW M3 GTR	1993 Salzburgring ADAC GT Cup round
250cc	1:23.270	Freddie Spencer	Honda NSR250	1985 Austrian motorcycle Grand Prix
350cc	1:24.230	Anton Mang	Kawasaki KR350	1982 Austrian motorcycle Grand Prix
Group 2	1:25.760	Tim Schenken	Jaguar XJ12C	1977 Salzburgring ETCC round
Group A	1:26.930	Win Percy	Jaguar XJS	1984 Salzburgring ETCC round
125cc	1:28.130	Fausto Gresini	Garelli 125cc GP	1985 Austrian motorcycle Grand Prix
Grand Prix Circuit (1969–1975): 4.238 km (2.633 mi)
Formula 5000	1:10.500	Peter Gethin	McLaren M10B	1970 Olympia Trophy
Formula Two	1:10.840	Patrick Depailler	Alpine A367	1973 Salzburgring F2 round
Group 5	1:11.800	John Burton	Chevron B21	1972 Salzburgring European 2-Litre Championship round
Group 6	1:14.000	Vic Elford	Lola T212	1971 Taurenpokal Salzburgring
Group 2	1:16.810	Hans-Joachim Stuck	BMW 3.0 CSL	1974 Salzburgring ETCC round
Formula Three	1:20.700	Alceste Bodini	Tecno 70/T00	1974 Salzburgring German F3 round
500cc	1:21.780	Giacomo Agostini	Yamaha YZR500	1975 Austrian motorcycle Grand Prix
350cc	1:23.850	Hideo Kanaya	Yamaha TZ 350	1975 Austrian motorcycle Grand Prix
250cc	1:27.700	Börje Jansson	Derbi 250 GP	1972 Austrian motorcycle Grand Prix
125cc	1:31.690	Pier Paolo Bianchi	Morbidelli 125	1975 Austrian motorcycle Grand Prix
50cc	1:47.000	Jan de Vries	Kreidler 50 GP	1971 Austrian motorcycle Grand Prix

== Results ==
=== Motorcycle Grand Prix ===
- 1971 500cc: Giacomo Agostini - MV Agusta
- 1975 500cc: Hideo Kanaya - Yamaha
- 1978 500cc: Kenny Roberts - Yamaha
- 1983 500cc: Kenny Roberts - Yamaha
- 1987 500cc: Wayne Gardner - Honda
- 1990 500cc: Kevin Schwantz - Suzuki
- 1994 500cc: Michael Doohan - Honda

=== European Touring Car Championship ===
Year	Winner(s)	Car
1970	(Austria) Helmut Marko	BMW 1600
1971	(Italy) Gian Luigi Picchi	Alfa Romeo 1300 GTA Junior
1972	(Italy) Carlo Facetti	Alfa Romeo 1300 GTA Junior
1973	(West Germany) Dieter Glemser (United Kingdom) John Fitzpatrick	Ford Capri RS 2600 LW
1974	(West Germany) Hans-Joachim Stuck (Belgium) Jacky Ickx	BMW 3.0 CSL
1975	(Austria) Dieter Quester (Switzerland) Urs Zondler	BMW 3.0 CSL
1976	(Belgium) Hughes de Fierlant (Belgium) Patrick Nève	BMW 3.0 CSL
1977	(Sweden) Gunnar Nilsson (Austria) Dieter Quester	BMW 3.0 CSL
1978	(Italy) Martino Finotto (Italy) Carlo Facetti	BMW 3.0 CSL
1979	(Italy) Martino Finotto (Italy) Carlo Facetti	BMW 3.0 CSL
1980	(Austria) Dieter Quester (West Germany) Dieter Kindlmann	BMW 320
1981	(Italy) Umberto Grano (West Germany) Helmut Kelleners	BMW 635 CSi
1982	(Czech Republic) Zdeněk Vojtěch (Austria) Jo Gartner	BMW 528i
1983	(United Kingdom) Tom Walkinshaw (United Kingdom) Chuck Nicholson	Jaguar XJS
1984	(United Kingdom) Tom Walkinshaw (United Kingdom) Chuck Nicholson	Jaguar XJS
1985	(Italy) Gianfranco Brancatelli (Sweden) Thomas Lindström	Volvo 240T
