= Aprilia RS660 =

- 2026 Aprilia RS 660
- Manufacturer: Aprilia
- Parent company: Piaggio
- Production: 2020–present
- Engine: 659 cc (40.2 cu in) liquid-cooled 4-stroke parallel-twin
- Bore / stroke: 81 mm × 63.93 mm (3.189 in × 2.517 in)
- Compression ratio: 13.5:1
- Power: 100 hp (75 kW) @ 10,500 rpm
- Torque: 67 N⋅m (49 lb⋅ft) @ 8,500 rpm
- Ignition type: Capacitor discharge electronic ignition (CDI)
- Suspension: Front; Hydraulic telescopic fork
- Brakes: Front; Ø 320 mm double disc Rear; Ø 220 mm single disc
- Tires: Front; 120/70 R17; Rear; 180/55 ZR 17
- Wheelbase: 53.9 in (1,370 mm)
- Weight: 373 lb (169 kg) (dry); 403 lb (183 kg) (wet)
- Fuel capacity: 15 L (3.3 imp gal; 4.0 US gal)
- Related: Aprilia RS457

The Aprilia RS660 is a sport bike designed and produced by Italian manufacturer Aprilia since 2020. Created as a mid-size contender for racing championships, it has two road legal models being the RS 660 and the RS 660 Factory. There is also a track only variant, the RS 660 Trofeo.

The engine, a 659 cm^{3} twin-cylinder with a double overhead camshaft and connecting rod pins at 270°, is capable of delivering 98 peak horse power at 10500 rpm and 67 Nm of torque at 8500 rpm. The frame is an aluminum double beam contributing to a total weight of 169 kg dry. The shock absorbers are adjustable with 41 mm upside-down Kayaba front forks. Electronics are the dedicated Marelli APRC sports system, which gives five performance settings, eight-level traction control, anti-wheelie, ABS, three levels of engine braking, and ride-by-wire throttle control.

In 2025, a new engine was introduced that increased the power output to 105 Hp and added some extra features to the electronics package. These included an extra rider profile, and Aprilia launch control (ALC).

== History ==
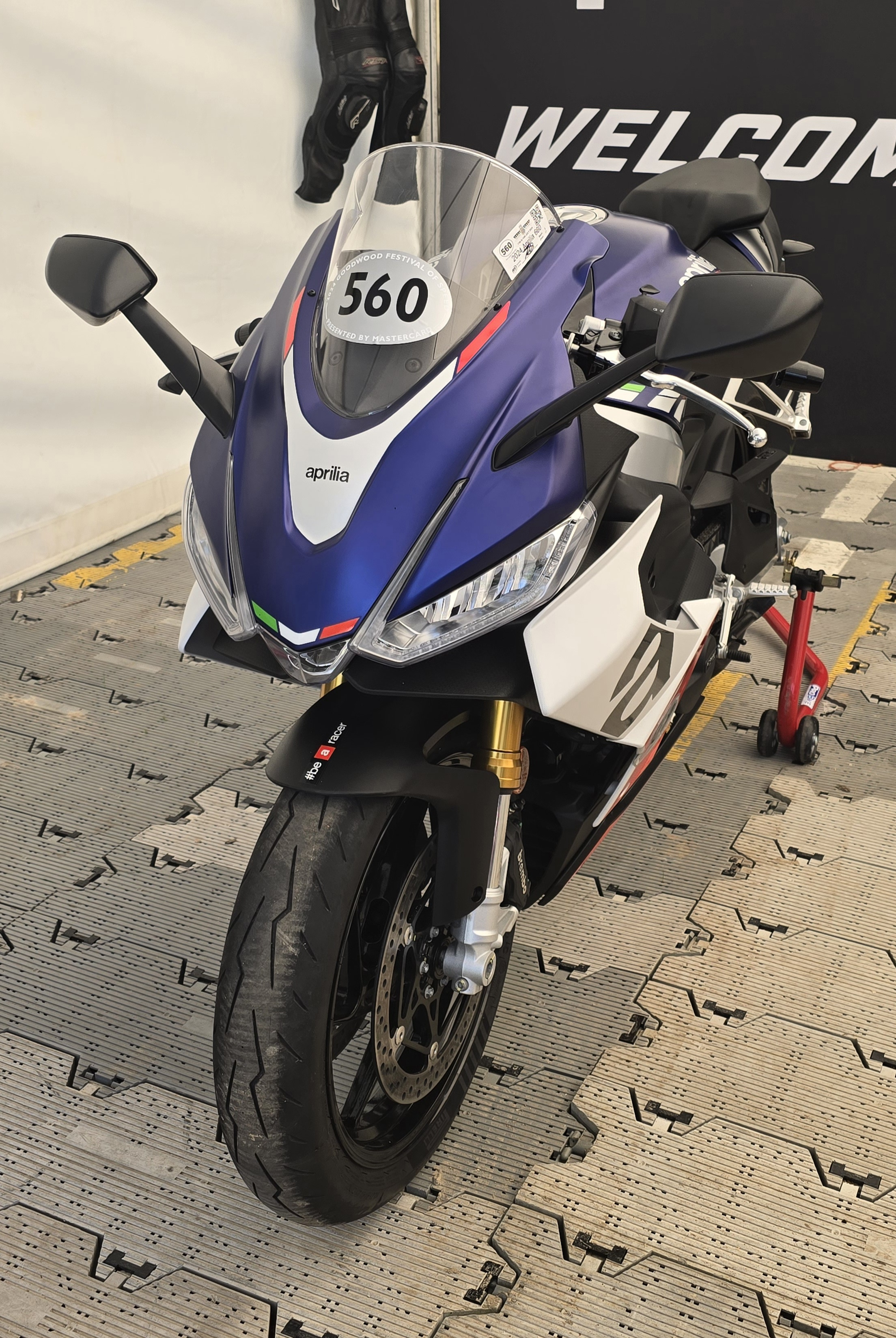
2024 Aprilia RS 660

In 2019 Aprilia displayed two sports prototypes, the RS 660 and the Tuono 660, at the 2019 EICMA show. The two were intended to fill a void in the range from the Noale manufacturer, to be able to compete with Japanese companies in the medium-displacement motorcycle sector. Designed as a smaller version of the new RSV4 1100, it shares its lines and chassis, the result of a project born in Piaggio Group Style Center.

In the spring of 2022, the factory version was introduced, which brought a technical update.

The machine finished second in the UK National Sportbike Championship, a new race series for 2024.

=== Aprilia RS660 Extrema ===
At the end of the year, a version called RS 660 Extrema was introduced, with modifications to the chassis for track use and lightening of some parts, reducing the weight to 166 kg.

=== Aprilia RS660 Trofeo ===
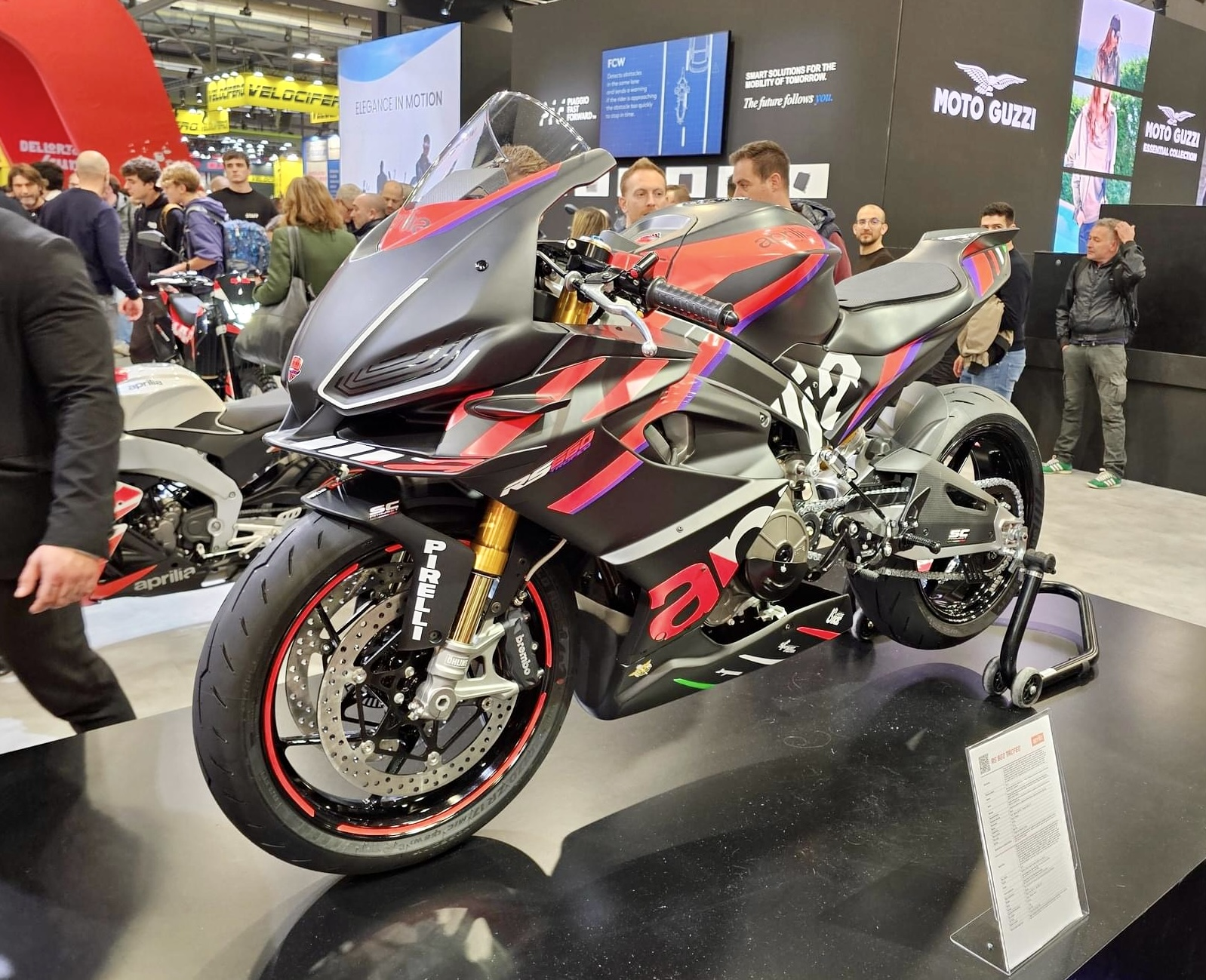
Aprilia RS660 Trofeo

A race-only (non-street-legal) version called the RS660 Trofeo was introduced in 2023, featuring updated electronics, fiberglass race bodywork, adjustable rearsets, a race top triple clamp, clip-ons and a full titanium SC-Project exhaust system. Reported power output was 105 hp and reported dry weight was 153 kg (337.3 lb).
