= Orechová Potôň =

Orechová Potôň Diósförgepatony
- Municipality
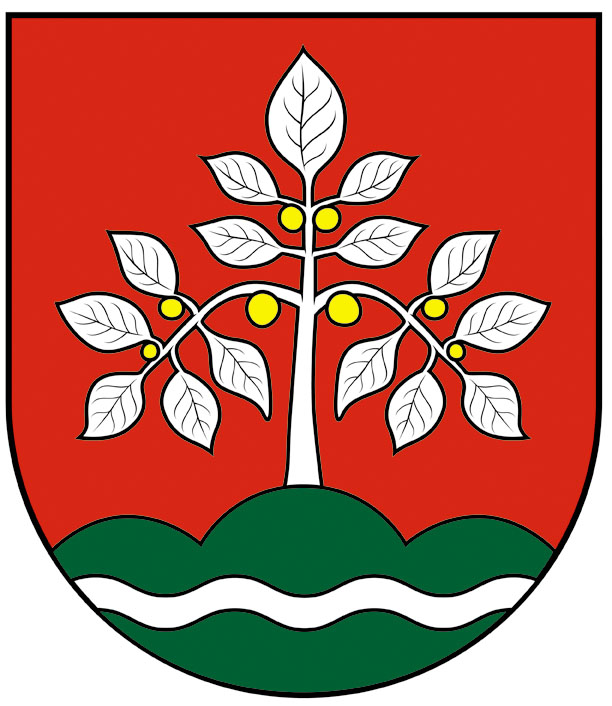
- Flag Coat of arms

- Location of Orechová Potôň in the Trnava Region Location of Orechová Potôň in Slovakia
- Coordinates: 48.02°N 17.54°E
- Country: Slovakia
- Region: Trnava Region
- District: Dunajská Streda District
- First mentioned: 1250

Government
  - Mayor: Szilárd Gállfy (Ind.)

Area
  - Total: 23.02 km^{2} (8.89 sq mi)
- Elevation: 118 m (387 ft)

Population (2025)
  - Total: 1,645

Ethnicity
  - Hungarians: 93,54%
  - Slovaks: 5,92%
- Time zone: UTC+1 (CET)
  - Summer (DST): UTC+2 (CEST)
- Postal code: 930 02
- Area code: +421 31
- Vehicle registration plate (until 2022): DS
- Website: www.orechovapoton.sk

Orechová Potôň (Hungarian: Diósförgepatony, pronounced [ˈdioːʃførɡɛpɒtoɲ]) is a village and municipality in the Dunajská Streda District in the Trnava Region of south-west Slovakia.

== History ==
In historical records the village was first mentioned in 1250. Until the end of World War I, it was part of Hungary and fell within the Dunaszerdahely district of Pozsony County. After the Austro-Hungarian army disintegrated in November 1918, Czechoslovak troops occupied the area. After the Treaty of Trianon of 1920, the village became officially part of Czechoslovakia. In November 1938, the First Vienna Award granted the area to Hungary, and it was held by Hungary until 1945. After Soviet occupation in 1945, Czechoslovak administration returned, and the village became officially part of Czechoslovakia in 1947.

Franco-Hungarian filmmaker Éva Balla-Falus was born there in 1913.

== Geography ==
The municipality lies at an altitude of 118 metres (387 ft) and covers an area of 23.02 km^{2} (8.89 sq mi) (2025).

== Population ==
Population statistic (10 years)
Year	1995	2005	2015	2025
Count	1622	1709	1686	1645
Difference		+5.36%	−1.34%	−2.43%

Population statistic
Year	2024	2025
Count	1676	1645
Difference		−1.84%

It has a population of 1645 people (31 December 2025).

=== Ethnicity ===
Census 2021 (1+ %)
Ethnicity	Number	Fraction
Hungarian	1352	79.29%
Slovak	360	21.11%
Not found out	79	4.63%
Total	1705	

In year 2021 was 1705 people by ethnicity 1352 as Hungarian, 360 as Slovak, 79 as Not found out, 5 as Romani, 3 as Czech, 3 as Other, 1 as Ukrainian, 1 as Rusyn, 1 as Russian, 1 as Polish and 1 as English.

Note on population: The difference values of population numbers in the table "Population statistic" and in the sections "Ethnicity" & "Religion" is caused by the use of various statistical methods.

=== Religion ===
Census 2021 (1+ %)
Religion	Number	Fraction
Roman Catholic Church	1060	62.17%
None	320	18.77%
Calvinist Church	189	11.09%
Not found out	65	3.81%
Greek Catholic Church	23	1.35%
Evangelical Church	19	1.11%
Total	1705	

In year 2021 was 1705 people by religion 1060 from Roman Catholic Church, 320 from None, 189 from Calvinist Church, 65 from Not found out, 23 from Greek Catholic Church, 19 from Evangelical Church, 13 from Christian Congregations in Slovakia, 3 from Other, 3 from Ad hoc movements, 2 from Jehovah's Witnesses, 2 from United Methodist Church, 2 from Buddhism, 1 from Old Catholic Church, 1 from Eastern Orthodox Church, 1 from Other and not ascertained christian church and 1 from Baptists Church.

== Motorsport ==
Automotodróm Slovakia Ring, the largest racing circuit in Slovakia, is located in Orechová Potôň. It was built between 2008 and 2009, and had since then hosted several major motorsport events, such as FIA World Touring Car Championship and FIA GT1 World Championship rounds.
