= Slovakia Ring =

Motor racing circuit in Orechová Potôň, Dunajská Streda District, Slovakia

Automotodróm Slovakia Ring
- Grand Prix Circuit (Variant 4) (2009–present)
- Location: Orechová Potôň, Slovakia
- Coordinates: 48°03′14″N 17°34′15″E
- Capacity: 6,500 (Grandstands)
- FIA Grade: 2 (for Variant V4b); 3 (for Variant V4)
- Broke ground: October 2008; 18 years ago
- Opened: 1 October 2009; 17 years ago
- Architect: Hans Roth
- Major events: Current: FIA European Truck Racing Championship (2017–2019, 2022–present); TCR Eastern Europe (2019–present); Former: FIA WTCR Race of Slovakia (2012–2016, 2018–2020); FIM EWC (2017–2019); Sidecar World Championship (2018); TCR Europe (2021); Blancpain GT Series (2014); FIA GT Series (2013); FIA GT1 (2012); ADAC GT Masters (2013–2014)
- Website: http://slovakiaring.sk/home-en/

Grand Prix Circuit (Variant 4b) (2018–present)
- Length: 5.935 km (3.688 mi)
- Turns: 16
- Race lap record: 1:45.932 ( (Netherlands) Klaas Zwart, Jaguar R5 F1, 2019, F1)

Grand Prix Circuit (Variant 4) (2009–present)
- Length: 5.922 km (3.680 mi)
- Turns: 14
- Race lap record: 1:43.115 ( (Austria) Andreas Zuber, Dallara GP2/05, 2010, GP2)

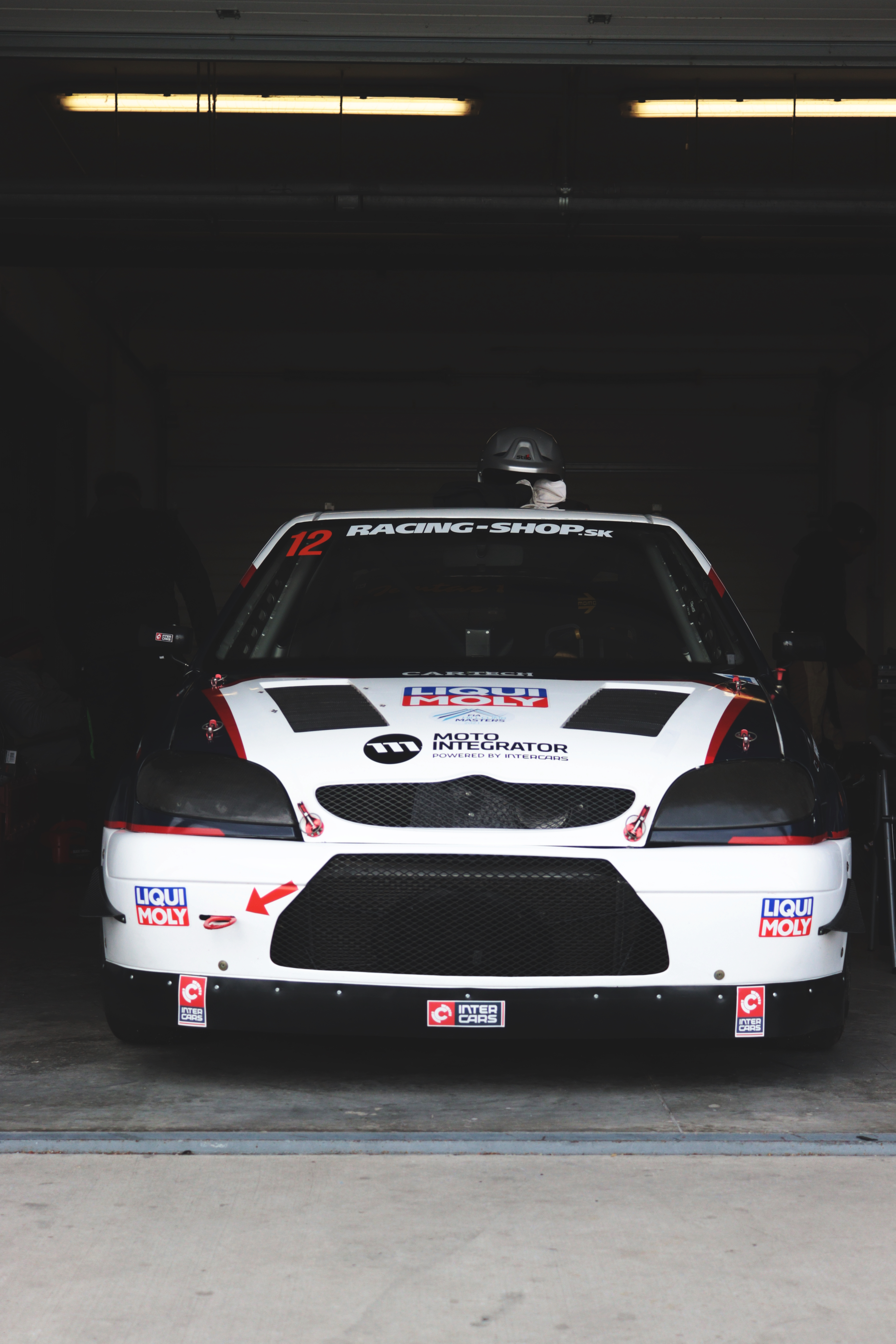

Automotodróm Slovakia Ring is a 5.935 km (3.688 mi) motor racing circuit in Orechová Potôň, Dunajská Streda District in Slovakia, approximately 30 km (19 mi) away from Bratislava Airport. It was built between 2008 and 2009.

== Description ==
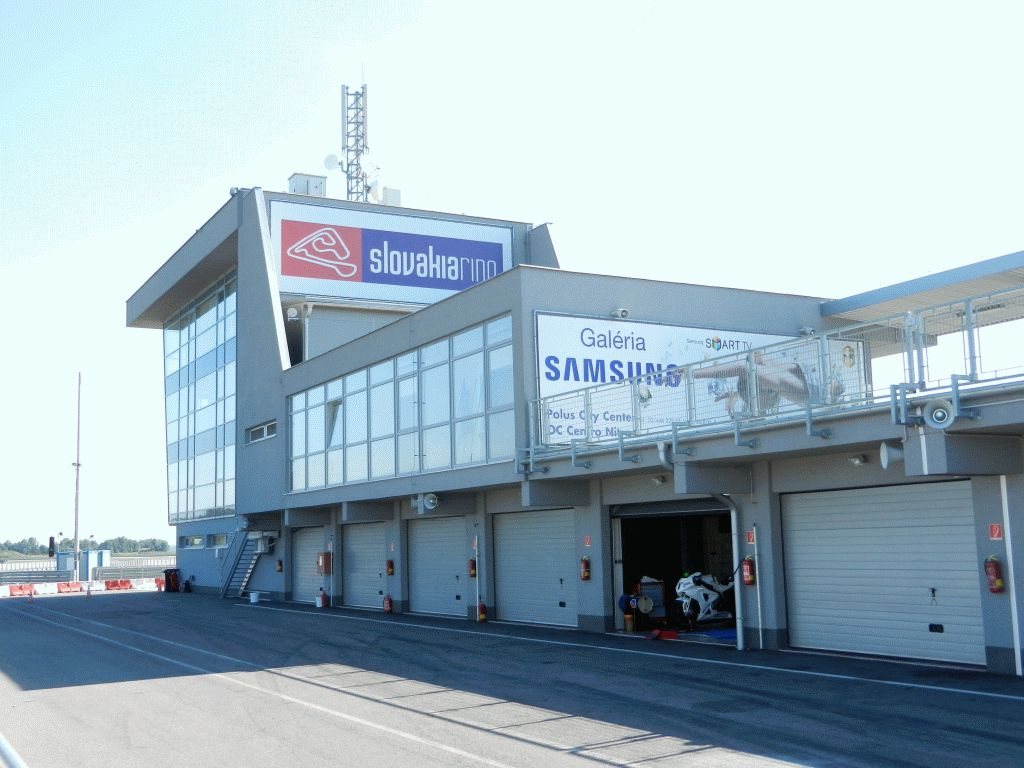
Pit lane and paddocks in 2012

New Zealand race car driver Matt Halliday suggested that the rear engine Porsches struggled with Slovakia Ring's long radius corners with much less front aerodynamics than the other cars.

A major feature of the circuit is a prominent hump on one of the straights that causes some cars to fly with the front wheels off the ground. Only one car has flipped over entirely and crashed after going over the hump at a high speed. Prior to start of the 2014 season the hump between turns 2 and 3 was rebuilt.

== Major events ==
=== FIA GT Championship and Blancpain Sprint Series ===
FIA GT3 European Championship

On 21 August 2011, the track hosted the fifth round of the 2011 FIA GT3 European Championship season. Winners of the two 29-lap races were Dominik Baumann and Brice Bosi in the first, and Philippe Giauque and Mike Parisy in the second, both teams driving in Mercedes-Benz SLS AMG. Many cars flew on the second hill.

FIA GT1 World Championship

On 10 June 2012, the track hosted the fourth round of the 2012 FIA GT1 World Championship season. The winners of the qualifying race were Filip Salaquarda and Toni Vilander in a Ferrari 458 Italia GT3, and the winners of the championship race were Michael Bartels and Yelmer Buurman in a BMW Z4 GT3.

FIA GT Series

On 18 August 2013, the track hosted the fourth round of the 2013 FIA GT Series season.

Blancpain Sprint Series

On 24 August 2014, the track hosted the fourth round of the 2014 Blancpain Sprint Series season, the successor of the FIA GT Series.

=== FIA World Touring Car Championship and Cup ===
On 6 February 2012, it was announced that Slovakia Ring will replace the Argentina race in the 2012 World Touring Car Championship calendar. The event took place on 29 April 2012, with Gabriele Tarquini winning the first race in a SEAT León and Robert Huff the second race in a Chevrolet Cruze.

It also hosted the Race of Slovakia in the following 2013 season calendar. The event took place on 28 April 2013, with Gabriele Tarquini winning the first race in a Honda Civic, and Tom Coronel the second race in BMW 320 TC.

The race took place on 11 May 2014 as part of the 2014 World Touring Car Championship season. The winning driver of the first race was Sébastien Loeb in a Citroën C-Elysée, while the second race was cancelled due to heavy rain.

In 2015, the race was pushed forward to 21 June, and the two winners were Yvan Muller and Sébastien Loeb, both in Citroën C-Elysée.

In 2016, it was pulled back to 17 April and the format of the championship was slightly changed, with an opening race with the top grid positions inversed and a second main race with the grid from the qualifying session. The winners were Tiago Monteiro in a Honda Civic in the opening race, and José María López in a Citroën C-Elysée in the main race.

In 2017, the race was not featured in the series calendar.

In 2018, with the new FIA World Touring Car Cup regulations and format, the race was added to the calendar on 7 June, once again as a replacement of the Argentina race. It took place on 13–15 July and the winners were Pepe Oriola in a Cupra León in the first race, and Gabriele Tarquini and Norbert Michelisz in the second and third races, both in Hyundai i30.

In 2019, the race was featured as the third round of the racing calendar, in the weekend 10–12 May. All three races took place on Sunday, as the event ran together with the FIM Endurance World Championship support series. The winners were Frédéric Vervisch (Audi RS3), Néstor Girolami (Honda Civic), and the Chinese driver Ma Qing Hua (Alfa Romeo Giulietta).

=== ADAC GT Masters ===
On 14 and 15 September 2013, the track hosted the seventh round of the 2013 ADAC GT Masters season.

Between 8 and 10 August 2014, the track hosted the fifth round of the 2014 ADAC GT Masters season.

=== Acceleration 2014 ===
Between 4 and 6 July 2014, the Slovakia Ring hosted the fifth weekend of Acceleration 2014, a series of festivals combining top class car and bike racing with music and entertainment.

=== Touring Car Endurance Series ===
The first ever 24 hours automobile sport event at the Slovakia Ring was the Hankook 24H SLOVAKIA RING on 15 and 16 June 2016, as part of the Touring Car Endurance Series. The race had a rather close finish. After 24 hours there was just a 20.9 seconds lead for ARC Bratislava by Ferry Monster Autosport. after 2016 Tour Car Endurance Series has not showed back to the event due to low car count.

=== FIA European Truck Racing Championship ===
Between 15 and 16 July 2017, the track will host the fourth round of the FIA European Truck Racing Championship.

The track was featured again in the 2018 season, between 14 and 15 July, as a support series of the FIA World Touring Car Cup.

The track was featured again in the 2022 season, between 2 and 3 July for the 3rd round of the FIA European Truck Racing Championship. From 2022, the track has been part of this championship.

== Events ==
Current

- June: FIA European Truck Racing Championship OMV MaxxMotion Truck Race of Slovakia, Formula 4 CEZ Championship, TCR European Endurance Touring Car Series, GT Cup Series, Porsche Sprint Challenge Central Europe
- August: TCR Eastern Europe Touring Car Series OMV MaxxMotion Grand Prix of Slovakia, Histo-Cup Austria Sunset Race Slovakia, GT Cup Series
- September: Alpe Adria International Motorcycle Championship

Former

- Acceleration 2014 (2014)
- ADAC Formel Masters (2013–2014)
- ADAC GT Masters (2013–2014)
- Blancpain GT Series (2014)
- EuroBOSS Series (2010)
- European Touring Car Cup (2012–2016)
- FIA GT Series (2013)
- FIA GT1 World Championship (2012)
- FIA GT3 European Championship (2011)
- FIM Endurance World Championship
  - 8 Hours of Slovakia Ring (2017–2019)
- Formula BMW Talent Cup (2013)
- GT4 European Series Northern Cup (2017)
- International GTSprint Series (2013)
- Sidecar World Championship (2018)
- Supercar Challenge (2013)
- Superstars Series (2013)
- TCR Europe Touring Car Series (2021)
- Touring Car Endurance Series
  - Hankook 24H Slovakia Ring (2016)
- Ultimate Cup Series (2019)
- World Touring Car Championship
  - FIA WTCC Race of Slovakia (2012–2016)
- World Touring Car Cup
  - FIA WTCR Race of Slovakia (2018–2020)

== Parameters ==
- Track length: 5.922 km (3.680 mi) (for Variant 4)
  5.935 km (3.688 mi) (for Variant 4b)
- Track width: 12 m (13 yd)
- Finishing point length: 900 m (980 yd)
- Finishing point width: 20 m (22 yd)
- Accelerating testing track length: 1.144 km (0.711 mi)
- Accelerating testing track width: 20 m (22 yd)

== Lap records ==
Klaas Zwart held the unofficial lap record with a lap of 1:39.002 with Jaguar R5 F1 in 2019. As of September 2026, the fastest official race lap records at the Automotodróm Slovakia Ring are listed as:

Category	Time	Driver	Vehicle	Event
Grand Prix Circuit Variant 4b (2018–present): 5.935 km (3.688 mi)
Formula One	1:45.932	Klaas Zwart	Jaguar R5 F1	2019 Slovakia Ring Maxx Formula round
Grand Prix Circuit Variant 4 (2009–present): 5.922 km (3.680 mi)
EuroBOSS/GP2	1:43.115	Andreas Zuber	Dallara GP2/05	2010 Slovakia Ring EuroBOSS round
LMP2	1:52.309	Miro Konôpka	Ligier JS P217	2017 Slovakia Ring ESET Cup round
LMP3	1:55.909	Miro Konôpka	Ligier JS P320	2025 1st Slovakia Ring GT Cup Endurance round
GT3	1:58.889	Krystian Korzeniowski	Ferrari 296 GT3	2024 2nd Slovakia Ring ESET Cup round
Superbike	2:02.371	Michal Filla	Ducati Panigale V4 R	2026 Slovakia Ring Alpe Adria Superbike round
Porsche Carrera Cup	2:02.650	Dieter Svepes	Porsche 911 (992 I) GT3 Cup	2023 Slovakia Ring Porsche Sprint Challenge Central Europe round
Formula 4	2:03.456	Michael Sauter	Tatuus F4-T421	2023 Slovakia Ring Formula 4 CEZ round
FIM EWC	2:03.886	Mike di Meglio	Honda CBR1000RR	2019 8 Hours of Slovakia Ring
TC1	2:05.748	Yvan Muller	Citroën C-Elysée WTCC	2015 FIA WTCC Race of Slovakia
ADAC Formel Masters	2:07.609	Marvin Dienst	Dallara Formulino	2013 Slovakia Ring ADAC Formel Masters round
Supersport	2:07.951	Bence Keskes	Yamaha YZF-R6	2025 Slovakia Ring Alpe Adria Supersport round
TCR Touring Car	2:10.590	Mikel Azcona	CUPRA León Competición TCR	2021 Slovakia Ring TCR Europe round
GT4	2:12.002	Ivan Kyam Potež	Mercedes-AMG GT4	2025 1st Slovakia Ring GT Cup Endurance round
Super 2000	2:12.918	Gabriele Tarquini	Honda Civic WTCC	2013 FIA WTCC Race of Slovakia
Sportbike	2:14.189	Daniel Turecek	Aprilia RS660	2026 Slovakia Ring Alpe Adria Sportbike round
Pickup truck racing	2:17.934	Danny Van Dongen	MWV6 Pick Up	2014 Slovakia Ring MW-V6 Pickup Series round
Supersport 300	2:22.086	Molik Mateusz	Yamaha YZF-R3	2023 2nd Slovakia Ring Alpe Adria Supersport 300 round
Renault Clio Cup	2:22.740	Szabolcs Lantos	Renault Clio R.S. IV Cup	2022 Slovakia Ring Clio Cup Bohemia round
Super 1600	2:30.513	Ulrike Krafft	Ford Fiesta 1.6 16V	2014 Slovakia Ring ETC round
Truck racing	2:42.803	Norbert Kiss	Mercedes-Benz Actros	2017 Slovakia Ring ETRC round
