= 2020 Drexler-Automotive Formula 3 Cup =

Motor racing competition

The 2020 Drexler-Automotive Formula 3 Cup was the 39th Austria Formula 3 Cup season and the second Drexler-Automotive Formula 3 Cup season.

== Teams and drivers ==
All Cup cars were built between 2008 and 2018, Trophy cars were built between 1992 and 2007, and Open class have more powerful engines.

Team	Chassis	Engine	No.	Driver	Class	Rounds
(Switzerland) Jo Zeller Racing	Dallara F306	Mercedes	2	(Switzerland) Urs Rüttimann	T	1, 4, 6
(Switzerland) Jo Zeller Racing	Dallara F308	Mercedes	11	(Switzerland) Kurt Böhlen	C	2, 6
(Switzerland) Jo Zeller Racing	Dallara F305	Mercedes	14	(Switzerland) Thomas Amweg	T	1
(Switzerland) Jo Zeller Racing	Dallara F312	Mercedes	44	(Switzerland) Sandro Zeller	C	1-4, 6
(Austria) Franz Wöss Racing	Dallara F306	Volkswagen	10	(Italy) Luca Iannoccone	C	1-3, 5
(Austria) Franz Wöss Racing	Dallara F308	Opel OPC	10	(Italy) Luca Iannoccone	C	4
(Austria) Franz Wöss Racing	Dallara F309	Volkswagen	12	(Switzerland) Thomas Aregger	C	1-4, 6
(Austria) Franz Wöss Racing	Dallara F309	Volkswagen	12	(Czech Republic) Antonin Sus	C	5
(Austria) Franz Wöss Racing	Dallara F308	Mugen	15	(Greece) Daniel Tapinos	C	3-6
(Austria) Franz Wöss Racing	Dallara F316	Opel OPC	17	(Austria) Stefan Fürtbauer	TBD	4
(Austria) Franz Wöss Racing	Dallara F305	Opel-Spiess	61	(Germany) Prof.-Dr.-Ing. Ralph Pütz	T	All
(Italy) Monolite Racing	Dallara F312	Mercedes	21	(Luxembourg) Brice Morabito	C	2-3
(Germany) Vogtland Racing Team	Dallara F308	Toyota	22	(Germany) Danny Luderer	C	3, 6
(Germany) Wachter Motorsport	Dallara F311	Fiat	24	(Germany) Christian Wachter	C	1
(Czech Republic) HKC Academy	Dallara F308	Fiat	62	(Czech Republic) Matej Kacovsky	C	1, 3
(Czech Republic) HKC Academy	Dallara F308	Fiat	62	(Czech Republic) Matej Kacovsky	O	5
(Czech Republic) Effective Racing Team	Dallara F313	TBD	7	(Czech Republic) Vladimir Netušil	O	4-5
(Czech Republic) GT2 Motorsport	Dallara F314	TBD	98	(Czech Republic) Vaclav Safar	O	4
Privateer	Dallara F313	Volkswagen	212	(Serbia) Paolo Brajnik	O	2-4, 6
Privateer	Dallara F317	TBD	212	(Serbia) Paolo Brajnik	O	5

Icon	Class
C	Championship
T	Trophy
O	Open

== Race calendar and results ==
R.	RN	Circuit	Date	Pole position	Fastest lap	Winning driver	Winning team	Trophy winner
1	1	(Austria) Salzburgring, Salzburg	12 July	(Switzerland) Thomas Aregger	(Switzerland) Sandro Zeller	(Switzerland) Sandro Zeller	(Switzerland) Jo Zeller Racing	(Switzerland) Thomas Amweg
1	2	(Austria) Salzburgring, Salzburg	12 July	(Switzerland) Sandro Zeller	(Switzerland) Sandro Zeller	(Switzerland) Sandro Zeller	(Switzerland) Jo Zeller Racing	(Switzerland) Thomas Amweg
2	1	(Italy) Mugello Circuit, Scarperia e San Piero	18 July	(Switzerland) Sandro Zeller	(Switzerland) Sandro Zeller	(Switzerland) Sandro Zeller	(Switzerland) Jo Zeller Racing	(Germany) Prof.-Dr.-Ing. Ralph Pütz
2	2	(Italy) Mugello Circuit, Scarperia e San Piero	19 July	TBD	(Luxembourg) Brice Morabito	(Switzerland) Sandro Zeller	(Switzerland) Jo Zeller Racing	(Germany) Prof.-Dr.-Ing. Ralph Pütz
3	1	(Italy) Autodromo Enzo e Dino Ferrari, Imola	29 August	(Italy) Bernardo Pellegrini (Note: Pellegrini was competing in the F2000 Italian Formula Trophy which shared the track with this championship.)	(Switzerland) Sandro Zeller	(Switzerland) Sandro Zeller	(Switzerland) Jo Zeller Racing	(Germany) Prof.-Dr.-Ing. Ralph Pütz
3	2	(Italy) Autodromo Enzo e Dino Ferrari, Imola	30 August	(Italy) Bernardo Pellegrini	(Switzerland) Sandro Zeller	(Switzerland) Sandro Zeller	(Switzerland) Jo Zeller Racing	(Germany) Prof.-Dr.-Ing. Ralph Pütz
4	1	(Czech Republic) Brno Circuit, Brno	5 September	(Switzerland) Sandro Zeller	(Switzerland) Sandro Zeller	(Switzerland) Sandro Zeller	(Switzerland) Jo Zeller Racing	(Switzerland) Urs Rüttimann
4	2	(Czech Republic) Brno Circuit, Brno	6 September	(Czech Republic) Vaclav Safar	(Switzerland) Sandro Zeller	(Switzerland) Sandro Zeller	(Switzerland) Jo Zeller Racing	(Switzerland) Urs Rüttimann
5	1	(Hungary) Hungaroring, Mogyoród	24 October	(Serbia) Paolo Brajnik	(Greece) Daniel Tapinos	(Greece) Daniel Tapinos	(Austria) Franz Wöss Racing	(Germany) Prof.-Dr.-Ing. Ralph Pütz
5	2	(Hungary) Hungaroring, Mogyoród	25 October	(Serbia) Paolo Brajnik	(Greece) Daniel Tapinos	(Greece) Daniel Tapinos	(Austria) Franz Wöss Racing	(Germany) Prof.-Dr.-Ing. Ralph Pütz
6	1	(Italy) Autodromo Nazionale Monza, Monza	7 November	(Switzerland) Sandro Zeller	(Switzerland) Sandro Zeller	(Switzerland) Thomas Aregger	(Austria) Franz Wöss Racing	(Switzerland) Urs Rüttimann
6	2	(Italy) Autodromo Nazionale Monza, Monza	8 November	(Switzerland) Thomas Aregger	(Switzerland) Sandro Zeller	(Switzerland) Sandro Zeller	(Switzerland) Jo Zeller Racing	(Switzerland) Urs Rüttimann

== Championship standings ==
Position	1st	2nd	3rd	4th	5th	6th	7th	8th	9th	10th
Main	25	18	15	12	10	8	6	4	2	1
Trophies	12.5	9	7.5	6	5	4	3	2	1	0.5

Standings for all competitions are shown below. There was no RAVENOL Formel 3 Cup classification for German drivers for this season.

=== Drexler-Automotive Formula 3 Cup ===
Pos	Driver	SAL (Austria)		MUG (Italy)		IMO (Italy)		BRN (Czech Republic)		HUN (Hungary)		MON (Italy)		Pts
1	(Switzerland) Sandro Zeller	1	**1**	**1**	1	1	1	**1**	1			**Ret**	1	225
2	(Switzerland) Thomas Aregger	**2**	2	2	2	3	2	2	2			1	**2**	184
3	(Germany) Dr. Ralph Pütz	7	6	6	6	5	4	5	5	4	3	5	7	115
4	(Greece) Daniel Tapinos					EX	3	4	4	1	1	3	6	112
5	(Switzerland) Urs Rüttimann	4	4					3	3			2	4	84
6	(Italy) Luca Iannaccone	5	5	5	5	Ret	DNS			3	DNP			55
7	(Switzerland) Kurt Böhlen			3	4							6	3	50
8	(Luxembourg) Brice Morabito			4	3	2	DNS							45
9	(Czech Republic) Antonin Sus									2	2			36
10	(Switzerland) Thomas Amweg	3	3											30
11	(Czech Republic) Matej Kacovsky	8	DNS			4	5							26
12	(Germany) Danny Luderer											4	5	22
13	(Germany) Christian Wachter	6	7											14
Pos	Driver	SAL		MUG		IMO		BRN		HUN		MON		Pts

Colour	Result
Gold	Winner
Silver	Second place
Bronze	Third place
Green	Points classification
Blue	Non-points classification
Blue	Non-classified finish (NC)
Purple	Retired, not classified (Ret)
Red	Did not qualify (DNQ)
Red	Did not pre-qualify (DNPQ)
Black	Disqualified (DSQ)
White	Did not start (DNS)
White	Withdrew (WD)
White	Race cancelled (C)
Blank	Did not practice (DNP)
Blank	Did not arrive (DNA)
Blank	Excluded (EX)

**Bold** – Pole
Italics – Fastest Lap

=== Drexler-Automotive Formula 3 Trophy ===
Pos	Driver	SAL (Austria)		MUG (Italy)		IMO (Italy)		BRN (Czech Republic)		HUN (Hungary)		MON (Italy)		Pts
1	(Germany) Dr. Ralph Pütz	7	6	6	6	5	4	5	5	4	3	5	7	126
2	(Switzerland) Urs Rüttimann	4	4					3	3			2	4	68
3	(Switzerland) Thomas Amweg	3	3											25
Pos	Driver	SAL		MUG		IMO		BRN		HUN		MON		Pts

=== Swiss Formula 3 Cup ===
Pos	Driver	SAL (Austria)		MUG (Italy)		IMO (Italy)		BRN (Czech Republic)		HUN (Hungary)	MON (Italy)		Pts
1	(Switzerland) Sandro Zeller	1	1	1	1	1	1	1	1		Ret	1	225
2	(Switzerland) Thomas Aregger	2	2	2	2	3	2	2	2		1	2	187
3	(Switzerland) Urs Rüttimann	4	4					3	3		2	4	84
4	(Switzerland) Kurt Böhlen			3	4						6	3	60
5	(Switzerland) Thomas Amweg	3	3										30
6	(Switzerland) Antonino Pellegrino (Note: Pellegrino was competing in the F2000 Italian Formula Trophy which shared the track with this championship.)			3	3								24
-	(Switzerland) Marcel Tobler												0
Pos	Driver	SAL		MUG		IMO		BRN		HUN	MON		Pts
