= 2015 Remus F3 Cup =

Motor racing competition

Seasons
- ← 2014 2016 →

The 2015 Remus F3 Cup was the 34th Austria Formula 3 Cup season and the third Remus F3 Cup season.

Jordi Weckx of Rennsport Rössler was crowned champion by one point over Performance Racing driver Akash Nandy, who missed the last round. Jörg Sandek became the Trophy class champion for the third time.

== Teams and drivers ==
All Cup cars were built between 2005 and 2011, while Trophy cars were built between 1992 and 2004.

Numbers used at Remus F3 Cup events listed; numbers used at races run to F2 Italian Trophy regulations displayed in tooltips.

Team	Chassis	Engine	No.	Driver	Class	Rounds
(Germany) CR-Racing Team	Dallara F308	Opel-Spiess	1	(Germany) Angelique Germann	C	1–3, 7
(Germany) CR-Racing Team	Dallara F309	Volkswagen-Spiess	6	(Germany) Andreas Germann	C	1–3, 7
(Germany) CR-Racing Team	Dallara F308	Mercedes	7	(Germany) Christian Zeller	C	2–4
(Italy) Facondini Racing	Dallara F308	Fiat-FPT	2	(Italy) Gianpaolo Lattanzi	C	7
(Switzerland) Jo Zeller Racing	Dallara F308	Mercedes	3	(Switzerland) Marcel Tobler	C	1, 7
(Switzerland) Jo Zeller Racing	Dallara F305	Opel-Spiess	14	(Switzerland) Thomas Amweg	C	1–5
(Switzerland) Jo Zeller Racing	Dallara F306	Mercedes	44	(Switzerland) Sandro Zeller	C	3–4
(Austria) Franz Wöss Racing (Note: In the Most round Christopher Höher's car was operated by Ma-Con Motorsport.)	Dallara F308	Opel-Spiess	4	(Austria) Stefan Neuburger	C	2
(Austria) Franz Wöss Racing	Dallara F308	Opel-Spiess	4	(Switzerland) Kurt Böhlen	C	3–7
(Austria) Franz Wöss Racing	Dallara F308	Opel-Spiess	5	(Austria) Christopher Höher	C	1–2, 4, 7
(Austria) Franz Wöss Racing	Dallara F312	Oreca	18	(Austria) Christopher Höher	C	5
(Austria) Franz Wöss Racing	Dallara F305	Opel-Spiess	10	(Germany) Dr. Ulrich Drechsler	C	1, 3–7
(Austria) Franz Wöss Racing	Dallara F303	Opel-Spiess	24	(Italy) Luca Iannaccone	T	All
(Austria) Lang Motorsport	Dallara F305	Opel-Spiess	8	(Austria) Manfred Lang	C	1–2, 4
(Austria) Lang Motorsport	Dallara F305	Opel-Spiess	9	(Austria) Mario Schopper	C	3, 7
(Italy) Puresport	Dallara F308	Fiat-FPT	8	(Italy) Dino Rasero	C	7
(Italy) Puresport	Dallara F308	Fiat-FPT	98	(Italy) Paolo Brajnik	C	7
(Hungary) Formula Student Kft.	Dallara F308	Fiat-FPT	11	(Hungary) Balázs Pödör	C	2
(Austria) Formel 1 Club	Dallara F305	Opel-Spiess	11	(Austria) Manfred Loach	C	6
(Germany) Rennsport Rössler	Dallara F308	Volkswagen-Spiess	12	(Belgium) Jordi Weckx	C	All
(Italy) Twister Italia	Dallara F308	Fiat-FPT	13	(Italy) Sergio Terrini	C	7
(Italy) Twister Italia	Dallara F308	Fiat-FPT	46	(Italy) Piero Longhi	C	7
(Italy) Twister Italia	Dallara F308	Toyota	51	(Italy) Bernardo Pellegrini	C	7
(Sweden) Performance Racing	Dallara F310	Volkswagen-Spiess	16	(Malaysia) Akash Nandy	C	1–6
(Poland) Inter Europol Competition	Dallara F308	Mercedes	19	(Poland) Jakub Śmiechowski	C	3–6
(France) Sylvain Warnecke	Dallara F302	Opel-Spiess	25	(France) Sylvain Warnecke	T	6–7
(Italy) One Racing	Dallara F308	Fiat-FPT	21	(Italy) Alessandro Bracalente	C	7
(Germany) Team Harder Motorsport	Dallara F302	Opel-Spiess	22	(Germany) Jörg Sandek	T	All
(Italy) HT Racing	Dallara F308	Volkswagen-Spiess	28	(Italy) Pierluigi Veronesi	C	7
(Germany) BELICON Motorsport	Reynard 903	Volkswagen	28	(Germany) Prof. Dr. Ralph Pütz	T	4–6
(Italy) TOMCAT Racing	Dallara F308	Fiat-FPT	29	(Italy) Renato Papaelo	C	7
(Italy) TOMCAT Racing	Dallara F314	Mercedes	69	(Italy) Marco Zanasi	C	1, 4, 7
(Italy) TOMCAT Racing	Dallara F308	Fiat-FPT	99	(Italy) Federico Ghirighelli	C	7
(Czech Republic) Frasmotorsport	Dallara F302	Opel-Spiess	72	(Czech Republic) Antonín Sus	T	2, 5, 7

Icon	Class
C	Cup
T	Trophy

== Calendar and race results ==
Round 1 and 7 (Monza and Brno) were held together with the F2 Italian Trophy. However, no Italian F2 Trophy competitors were eligible to score Remus F3 Cup points.

R.	RN	Circuit	Date	Pole position	Fastest lap	Winning driver	Winning team	Trophy winner
1	1	(Italy) Monza, Monza	18 May	(Malaysia) Akash Nandy	(Malaysia) Akash Nandy	(Malaysia) Akash Nandy	(Sweden) Performance Racing	(Germany) Jörg Sandek
1	2	(Italy) Monza, Monza	19 May		(Malaysia) Akash Nandy	(Malaysia) Akash Nandy	(Sweden) Performance Racing	(Italy) Luca Iannaccone
2	3	(Austria) Red Bull Ring, Spielberg	23 May	(Austria) Christopher Höher	(Austria) Christopher Höher	(Austria) Christopher Höher	(Austria) Franz Wöss Racing	(Germany) Jörg Sandek
2	4	(Austria) Red Bull Ring, Spielberg	24 May	(Malaysia) Akash Nandy	(Malaysia) Akash Nandy	(Malaysia) Akash Nandy	(Sweden) Performance Racing	(Czech Republic) Antonín Sus
3	5	(Germany) Hockenheimring, Hockenheim	3 July	(Malaysia) Akash Nandy	(Malaysia) Akash Nandy	(Malaysia) Akash Nandy	(Sweden) Performance Racing	(Germany) Jörg Sandek
3	6	(Germany) Hockenheimring, Hockenheim	4 July	(Malaysia) Akash Nandy	(Malaysia) Akash Nandy	(Malaysia) Akash Nandy	(Sweden) Performance Racing	(Germany) Jörg Sandek
4	7	(Austria) Salzburgring, Salzburg	25 July	(Malaysia) Akash Nandy	(Malaysia) Akash Nandy	(Switzerland) Sandro Zeller	(Switzerland) Jo Zeller Racing	(Germany) Jörg Sandek
4	8	(Austria) Salzburgring, Salzburg	26 July	(Malaysia) Akash Nandy	(Switzerland) Sandro Zeller	(Austria) Christopher Höher	(Austria) Franz Wöss Racing	(Germany) Jörg Sandek
5	9	(Czech Republic) Autodrom Most, Most	8 August	(Malaysia) Akash Nandy	(Malaysia) Akash Nandy	(Malaysia) Akash Nandy	(Sweden) Performance Racing	(Czech Republic) Antonín Sus
5	10	(Czech Republic) Autodrom Most, Most	9 August	(Malaysia) Akash Nandy	(Malaysia) Akash Nandy	(Malaysia) Akash Nandy	(Sweden) Performance Racing	(Czech Republic) Antonín Sus
6	11	(Germany) Lausitzring, Klettwitz	15 August	(Malaysia) Akash Nandy	(Malaysia) Akash Nandy	(Malaysia) Akash Nandy	(Sweden) Performance Racing	(Germany) Jörg Sandek
6	12	(Germany) Lausitzring, Klettwitz	16 August	(Malaysia) Akash Nandy	(Poland) Jakub Śmiechowski	(Belgium) Jordi Weckx	(Germany) Rennsport Rössler	(Germany) Jörg Sandek
7	13	(Czech Republic) Brno Circuit, Brno	19 September	(Austria) Christopher Höher	(Austria) Christopher Höher	(Austria) Christopher Höher	(Austria) Franz Wöss Racing	(Czech Republic) Antonín Sus
7	14	(Czech Republic) Brno Circuit, Brno	20 September	(Austria) Christopher Höher	(Austria) Christopher Höher	(Austria) Christopher Höher	(Austria) Franz Wöss Racing	(Czech Republic) Antonín Sus

== Championship standings ==
Position	1st	2nd	3rd	4th	5th	6th	7th	8th	9th	10th
Cup	20	18	15	12	10	8	6	4	2	1
Trophy	12.5	9	7.5	6	5	4	3	2	1	0.5

=== Cup ===
Pos	Driver	MON (Italy)		RBR (Austria)		HOC (Germany)		SAL (Austria)		MOS (Czech Republic)		LAU (Germany)		BRN (Czech Republic)		Pts
1	(Belgium) Jordi Weckx	4	3	4	2	4	3	6	3	3	2	2	1	2	2	219
2	(Malaysia) Akash Nandy	1	1	2	1	1	1	Ret	DNS	1	1	1	DNS			218
3	(Switzerland) Thomas Amweg	3	4	3	3	3	4	2	Ret	2	3					135
4	(Poland) Jakub Śmiechowski					NC	NC	4	8	5	4	3	2	1	1	121
5	(Austria) Christopher Höher	2	2	1	2			3	1	NC	NC			NC	NC	113
6	(Switzerland) Kurt Böhlen					6	6	5	2	8	5	4	3	6	4	105
7	(Switzerland) Sandro Zeller					2	2	1	5							71
8	(Germany) Jörg Sandek	8	7	8	11	9	10	8	4	6	7	6	5	12	8	69
9	(Czech Republic) Antonín Sus			9	7					4	6			5	6	46
10	(Austria) Mario Schopper					5	5							4	5	42
11	(Switzerland) Marcel Tobler	5	Ret											3	3	40
12	(Germany) Dr. Ulrich Drechsler	DNS	DNS			Ret	Ret	11	6	7	8	7	6	9	9	36
12	(Italy) Luca Iannaccone	9	6	10	9	12	12	10	7	9	9	8	7	10	10	36
14	(Austria) Manfred Lang	6	5	6	8			9	11							32
14	(Germany) Andreas Germann	7	8	11	12	7	7							8	7	32
16	(Germany) Christian Zeller			7	6	8	8	7	10							29
17	(Austria) Manfred Loach											5	4			22
18	(Austria) Stefan Neuburger			5	5											20
19	(Germany) Angelique Germann	10	9	Ret	10	10	9							7	12	13
20	(Germany) Dr. Ralph Pütz							Ret	9	10	10	10	9			7
21	(France) Sylvain Warnecke											9	8	11	11	6

=== Trophy ===
Pos	Driver	MON (Italy)		RBR (Austria)		HOC (Germany)		SAL (Austria)		MOS (Czech Republic)		LAU (Germany)		BRN (Czech Republic)		Pts
1	(Germany) Jörg Sandek	8	7	8	11	9	10	8	4	6	7	6	5	12	8	149.5
2	(Italy) Luca Iannaccone	9	6	10	9	12	12	10	7	9	9	8	7	10	10	123.5
3	(Czech Republic) Antonín Sus			9	7					4	6			5	6	71.5
4	(Germany) Dr. Ralph Pütz							Ret	9	10	10	10	9			31.5
5	(Germany) Dr. Ralph Pütz							Ret	9	10	10	10	9			31.5
5	(France) Sylvain Warnecke											9	8	11	11	28.5
