= 2016 Remus F3 Cup =

Motor racing competition

Seasons
- ← 2015 2017 →

The 2016 Remus F3 Cup was the 35th Austria Formula 3 Cup season and the fourth Remus F3 Cup season.

Despite missing the fifth round of the season, Sandro Zeller of Jo Zeller Racing was crowned champion by 69 points over Franz Wöss Racing driver Kurt Böhlen.

== Teams and drivers ==
All Cup cars were built between 2005 and 2011, while Trophy cars were built between 1992 and 2004.

Numbers used at Remus F3 Cup events listed; numbers used at races run to F2 Italian Trophy regulations displayed in Tooltips.

Team	Chassis	Engine	No.	Driver	Class	Rounds
(Austria) Franz Wöss Racing	Dallara F308	Opel-Spiess	1	(Germany) Angelique Germann	C	All
(Austria) Franz Wöss Racing	Dallara F308	Opel-Spiess	4	(Switzerland) Kurt Böhlen	C	All
(Austria) Franz Wöss Racing	Dallara F308	Opel-Spiess	5	(Austria) Franz Wöss	C	2–3, 7
(Austria) Franz Wöss Racing	Dallara F308	Opel-Spiess	5	(Austria) Stefan Neuburger	C	6
(Austria) Franz Wöss Racing	Dallara F305	Opel-Spiess	10	(Germany) Dr. Ulrich Drechsler	C	1–5
(Austria) Franz Wöss Racing	Dallara F303	Opel-Spiess	24	(Italy) Luca Iannaccone	T	All
(Switzerland) Jo Zeller Racing	Dallara F306	Opel-Spiess	2	(Switzerland) Urs Rüttimann	C	4, 6
(Switzerland) Jo Zeller Racing	Dallara F308	Mercedes	3	(Switzerland) Marcel Tobler	C	All
(Switzerland) Jo Zeller Racing	Dallara F308	Mercedes	44	(Switzerland) Sandro Zeller	C	1–4, 6–7
(Austria) Team LogiPlus	Dallara F308	Opel-Spiess	5	(Austria) Franz Wöss	C	1
(Germany) CR-Racing Team	Dallara F309	Volkswagen-Spiess	6	(Germany) Andreas Germann	C	All
(Austria) Lang Motorsport (Austria) LS-Performance	Dallara F305	Opel-Spiess	9	(Austria) Manfred Lang	C	2, 7
(Austria) Lang Motorsport (Austria) LS-Performance	Dallara F305	Opel-Spiess	10	(Austria) Mario Schopper	C	1, 3, 6
(Germany) Philipp Regensperger	Dallara F305	Opel-Spiess	12	(Germany) Philipp Regensperger	T	4, 7
(Germany) Team Harder Motorsport	Dallara F302	Opel-Spiess	22	(Germany) Jörg Sandek	T	All
(France) Sylvain Warnecke	Dallara F302	Opel-Spiess	25	(France) Sylvain Warnecke	T	5, 7
(Germany) BELICON Motorsport	Reynard 903	Volkswagen	28	(Germany) Prof. Dr. Ralph Pütz	T	1
(Czech Republic) Antonín Sus	Dallara F302	Opel-Spiess	72	(Czech Republic) Antonín Sus	T	1, 3, 6–7
(Italy) Puresport	Dallara F308	Volkswagen-Spiess	212	(Italy) Paolo Brajnik	C	All

Icon	Class
C	Cup
T	Trophy

== Calendar and race results ==
Round 2 and 4 (Imola and Hockenheim) were held together with the F2 Italian Trophy. However, no Italian F2 Trophy competitors were eligible to score Remus F3 Cup points.

R.	RN	Circuit	Date	Pole position	Fastest lap	Winning driver	Winning team	Trophy winner
1	1	(Austria) Red Bull Ring, Spielberg	14 May	(Switzerland) Sandro Zeller	(Italy) Paolo Brajnik	(Switzerland) Sandro Zeller	(Switzerland) Jo Zeller Racing	(Czech Republic) Antonín Sus
1	2	(Austria) Red Bull Ring, Spielberg	15 May	(Switzerland) Kurt Böhlen	(Italy) Paolo Brajnik	(Switzerland) Sandro Zeller	(Switzerland) Jo Zeller Racing	(Czech Republic) Antonín Sus
2	3	(Italy) Autodromo Enzo e Dino Ferrari, Imola	28 May	(Italy) Andrea Fontana	(Italy) Andrea Fontana	(Switzerland) Sandro Zeller	(Switzerland) Jo Zeller Racing	(Germany) Jörg Sandek
2	4	(Italy) Autodromo Enzo e Dino Ferrari, Imola	29 May	(Italy) Alessandro Bracalente	(Italy) Marco Zanasi	(Italy) Andrea Fontana	(Italy) HT Powertrain	(Germany) Jörg Sandek
3	5	(Czech Republic) Autodrom Most, Most	18 June	(Switzerland) Sandro Zeller	(Italy) Paolo Brajnik	(Italy) Paolo Brajnik	(Italy) Puresport	(Czech Republic) Antonín Sus
3	6	(Czech Republic) Autodrom Most, Most	19 June	(Switzerland) Sandro Zeller	(Switzerland) Sandro Zeller	(Switzerland) Sandro Zeller	(Switzerland) Jo Zeller Racing	(Czech Republic) Antonín Sus
4	7	(Germany) Hockenheimring, Hockenheim	8 July	(Switzerland) Sandro Zeller	(Switzerland) Sandro Zeller	(Switzerland) Sandro Zeller	(Switzerland) Jo Zeller Racing	(Germany) Jörg Sandek
4	8	(Germany) Hockenheimring, Hockenheim	9 July	(Switzerland) Sandro Zeller	(Switzerland) Sandro Zeller	(Switzerland) Sandro Zeller	(Switzerland) Jo Zeller Racing	(Germany) Jörg Sandek
5	9	(Germany) Lausitzring, Klettwitz	15 July	(Switzerland) Kurt Böhlen	(Germany) Andreas Germann	(Germany) Angelique Germann	(Austria) Franz Wöss Racing	(Germany) Jörg Sandek
5	10	(Germany) Lausitzring, Klettwitz	16 July	(Switzerland) Kurt Böhlen	(Switzerland) Kurt Böhlen	(Switzerland) Kurt Böhlen	(Austria) Franz Wöss Racing	(Germany) Jörg Sandek
6	11	(Austria) Salzburgring, Salzburg	6 August	(Switzerland) Kurt Böhlen	(Switzerland) Sandro Zeller	(Switzerland) Sandro Zeller	(Switzerland) Jo Zeller Racing	(Czech Republic) Antonín Sus
6	12	(Austria) Salzburgring, Salzburg	7 August	(Switzerland) Kurt Böhlen	(Switzerland) Sandro Zeller	(Switzerland) Sandro Zeller	(Switzerland) Jo Zeller Racing	(Czech Republic) Antonín Sus
7	13	(Czech Republic) Brno Circuit, Brno	10 September	(Germany) Philipp Regensperger	(Germany) Philipp Regensperger	(Italy) Paolo Brajnik	(Italy) Puresport	(Czech Republic) Antonín Sus
7	14	(Czech Republic) Brno Circuit, Brno	11 September	(Italy) Paolo Brajnik	(Italy) Paolo Brajnik	(Italy) Paolo Brajnik	(Italy) Puresport	(Czech Republic) Antonín Sus

== Championship standings ==
Position	1st	2nd	3rd	4th	5th	6th	7th	8th	9th	10th
Cup	20	18	15	12	10	8	6	4	2	1
Trophy	12.5	9	7.5	6	5	4	3	2	1	0.5

=== Cup ===
Pos	Driver	RBR (Austria)		IMO (Italy)		MOS (Czech Republic)		HOC (Germany)		LAU (Germany)		SAL (Austria)		BRN (Czech Republic)		Pts
1	(Switzerland) Sandro Zeller	1	1	1	4	2	1	1	1			1	1	8	2	265
2	(Switzerland) Kurt Böhlen	Ret	3	2	9	4	3	2	2	DNS	1	2	3	3	3	196
3	(Italy) Paolo Brajnik	2	2	18	5	1	2	5	5			5	Ret	1	1	193
4	(Switzerland) Marcel Tobler	3	4	5	10	3	Ret	7	8			4	4	4	5	135
5	(Germany) Angelique Germann	Ret	10	9	11	7	5	9	11	1	2	6	Ret	5	6	124
6	(Germany) Jörg Sandek	7	Ret	14	8	9	7	18	15	2	4	10	9	12	12	77
6	(Austria) Mario Schopper	4	5			5	4					3	2			77
8	(Germany) Andreas Germann	8	8	19	20	11	8	14	12	3	3	12	7	11	9	67
9	(Germany) Philipp Regensperger							11	7					2	4	50
9	(Czech Republic) Antonín Sus	6	6			6	6					9	8	6	8	50
11	(Austria) Franz Wöss	5	7	17	18	8	DNS							7	7	42
12	(Germany) Dr. Ulrich Drechsler	9	9	21	12	10	9	17	17	4	5					41
13	(Italy) Luca Iannaccone	10	11	24	19	12	10	19	18	5	6	11	10	10	11	23
14	(Switzerland) Urs Rüttimann							16	19			8	5			18
15	(Austria) Stefan Neuburger											7	6			14
16	(Austria) Manfred Lang			22	17									9	10	8
17	(France) Sylvain Warnecke													13	13	0

=== Trophy ===
Pos	Driver	RBR (Austria)		IMO (Italy)		MOS (Czech Republic)		HOC (Germany)		LAU (Germany)		SAL (Austria)		BRN (Czech Republic)		Pts
1	(Germany) Jörg Sandek	7	Ret	14	8	9	7	18	15	2	4	10	9	21	23	135
2	(Italy) Luca Iannaccone	13	12	24	21	16	10	19	18	8	6	11	10	17	17	118.5
3	(Czech Republic) Antonín Sus	6	6			6	7					9	8	6	8	100
4	(France) Sylvain Warnecke													13	13	12
Pos	Driver	RBR (Austria)		IMO (Italy)		MOS (Czech Republic)		HOC (Germany)		LAU (Germany)		SAL (Austria)		BRN (Czech Republic)		Pts

=== German F3 Trophy ===
Pos	Driver	RBR (Austria)		IMO (Italy)		MOS (Czech Republic)		HOC (Germany)		LAU (Germany)		SAL (Austria)		BRN (Czech Republic)		Pts
1	(Germany) Angelique Germann	Ret	10	9	11	7	5	9	11	1	2	6	Ret	5	6	262
2	(Germany) Andreas Germann	8	8	19	20	11	8	14	12	3	3	12	7	11	9	230
3	(Germany) Jörg Sandek	7	Ret	14	8	9	7	18	15	2	4	10	9	12	12	219
4	(Germany) Dr. Ulrich Drechsler	9	9	21	12	10	9	17	17	4	5					133
5	(Germany) Philipp Regensperger							11	7					2	4	93
6	(Germany) Prof. Dr. Ralph Pütz	Ret	DNS													0
Pos	Driver	RBR (Austria)		IMO (Italy)		MOS (Czech Republic)		HOC (Germany)		LAU (Germany)		SAL (Austria)		BRN (Czech Republic)		Pts

=== Swiss F3 Cup ===
Pos	Driver	RBR (Austria)		IMO (Italy)		MOS (Czech Republic)		HOC (Germany)		LAU (Germany)		SAL (Austria)		BRN (Czech Republic)		Pts
1	(Switzerland) Sandro Zeller	1	1	1	4	2	1	1	1			1	1	8	2	290
2	(Switzerland) Kurt Böhlen	Ret	3	2	9	4	3	2	2	DNS	1	2	3	3	3	227
3	(Switzerland) Marcel Tobler	3	4	5	10	3	Ret	7	8			4	4	4	5	174
4	(Switzerland) Urs Rüttimann							16	19			8	5			48
Pos	Driver	RBR (Austria)		IMO (Italy)		MOS (Czech Republic)		HOC (Germany)		LAU (Germany)		SAL (Austria)		BRN (Czech Republic)		Pts
