= 2014 Remus F3 Cup =

Motorsport event

Seasons
- ← 2013 2015 →

The 2014 Remus F3 Cup was the 33rd Austria Formula 3 Cup season and the second Remus F3 Cup season.

Thomas Amweg of Jo Zeller Racing was crowned champion by 127 points over Inter Europol Competition driver Jakub Śmiechowski. Florian Schnitzenbaumer became the Trophy class champion for the first time.

== Teams and drivers ==
All Cup cars were built between 2005 and 2011, while Trophy cars were built between 1992 and 2004.

Numbers used at Remus F3 Cup events listed; numbers used at races run to F2 Italian Trophy regulations displayed in tooltips.

Team	Chassis	Engine	No.	Driver	Class	Rounds
(Austria) Franz Wöss Racing	Dallara F305	Opel-Spiess	1	(Germany) Angelique Germann	C	1–3, 7
(Austria) Franz Wöss Racing	Dallara F308	Opel-Spiess	2	(Austria) Stefan Neuburger	C	1
(Austria) Franz Wöss Racing	Dallara F308	Opel-Spiess	2	(Austria) Franz Wöss	C	2, 4–5, 7
(Austria) Franz Wöss Racing	Dallara F308	Opel-Spiess	2	(Switzerland) Nikolaj Rogivue	C	6
(Austria) Franz Wöss Racing	Dallara F306	Opel-Spiess	9	(Finland) Jani Tammi	C	7
(Austria) Franz Wöss Racing	Dallara F308	Mercedes	10	(Austria) Christopher Höher	C	1
(Austria) Franz Wöss Racing	Dallara F305	Opel-Spiess	11	(Austria) Franz Wöss	C	1
(Austria) Franz Wöss Racing	Dallara F302	Opel-Spiess	23	(Austria) Florian Schnitzenbaumer	T	1
(Austria) Franz Wöss Racing	Dallara F302	Opel-Spiess	28	(Austria) Florian Schnitzenbaumer	T	2–5, 7
(Austria) Franz Wöss Racing	Dallara F302	Opel-Spiess	28	(Italy) Luca Iannaccone	T	6
(Switzerland) Jo Zeller Racing	Dallara F308	Mercedes	3	(Switzerland) Marcel Tobler	C	All
(Switzerland) Jo Zeller Racing	Dallara F305	Mercedes	14	(Switzerland) Thomas Amweg	C	All
(Italy) MI-VA	Dallara F308	Fiat-FPT	4	(Italy) Paolo Vaggiagini	C	1
(Italy) MI-VA	Dallara F308	Fiat-FPT	5	(Italy) Enrico Milani	C	1
(Germany) CR-Racing Team	Dallara F305	Opel-Spiess	6	(Germany) Andreas Germann	C	1–3, 7
(Germany) CR-Racing Team	Dallara F308	Mercedes	7	(Germany) Christian Zeller	C	1–3, 7
(Switzerland) Sträuli Motorsport	Dallara F306	Mercedes	8	(Switzerland) Willi Sträuli	C	3
(Austria) Lang Motorsport	Dallara F305	Opel-Spiess	9	(Austria) Manfred Lang	C	3–5
(Austria) Neuhauser Racing	Dallara F308	Volkswagen-Spiess	10	(Austria) Josef Neuhauser	C	2
(Poland) Inter Europol Competition	Dallara F308	Mercedes	19	(Poland) Jakub Śmiechowski	C	1, 4–7
(Germany) Team Harder Motorsport	Dallara F302	Opel-Spiess	21	(Germany) Dr. Ulrich Drechsler	T	1, 4, 6–7
(France) Sylvain Warnecke	Dallara F302	Opel-Spiess	22	(France) Sylvain Warnecke	T	3–4, 6–7
(Germany) Amkon Motorsport	Dallara F308	Opel-Spiess	25	(Germany) Maximilian Hackl	C	3
(Italy) Puresport	Dallara F302	Mugen-Honda	26	(Italy) Giorgio Venica	T	1

Icon	Class
C	Cup
T	Trophy

== Calendar and race results ==
Round 6 (Imola) was held together with the F2 Italian Trophy. Italian F2 Trophy competitors were ineligible to score Remus F3 Cup points.

R.	RN	Circuit	Date	Pole position	Fastest lap	Winning driver	Winning team	Trophy winner
1	1	(Austria) Red Bull Ring, Spielberg	17 May	(Austria) Christopher Höher	(Switzerland) Thomas Amweg	(Switzerland) Thomas Amweg	(Switzerland) Jo Zeller Racing	(Germany) Florian Schnitzenbaumer
1	2	(Austria) Red Bull Ring, Spielberg	18 May		(Austria) Christopher Höher	(Austria) Christopher Höher	(Austria) Franz Wöss Racing	(Italy) Giorgio Venica
2	3	(Austria) Salzburgring, Salzburg	4 July	(Switzerland) Thomas Amweg	(Switzerland) Thomas Amweg	(Switzerland) Thomas Amweg	(Switzerland) Jo Zeller Racing	(Germany) Florian Schnitzenbaumer
2	4	(Austria) Salzburgring, Salzburg	5 July	(Switzerland) Thomas Amweg	(Switzerland) Thomas Amweg	(Switzerland) Thomas Amweg	(Switzerland) Jo Zeller Racing	(Germany) Florian Schnitzenbaumer
3	5	(Germany) Hockenheimring, Hockenheim	25 July	(Switzerland) Thomas Amweg	(Germany) Maximilian Hackl	(Switzerland) Thomas Amweg	(Switzerland) Jo Zeller Racing	(Germany) Florian Schnitzenbaumer
3	6	(Germany) Hockenheimring, Hockenheim	26 July	(Switzerland) Thomas Amweg	(Switzerland) Thomas Amweg	(Switzerland) Thomas Amweg	(Switzerland) Jo Zeller Racing	(Germany) Florian Schnitzenbaumer
4	7	(Czech Republic) Autodrom Most, Most	9 August	(Switzerland) Thomas Amweg	(Switzerland) Thomas Amweg	(Switzerland) Thomas Amweg	(Switzerland) Jo Zeller Racing	(Germany) Florian Schnitzenbaumer
4	8	(Czech Republic) Autodrom Most, Most	10 August	(Switzerland) Thomas Amweg	(Switzerland) Thomas Amweg	(Switzerland) Thomas Amweg	(Switzerland) Jo Zeller Racing	(Germany) Florian Schnitzenbaumer
5	9	(Czech Republic) Brno Circuit, Brno	13 September	(Poland) Jakub Śmiechowski	(Poland) Jakub Śmiechowski	(Poland) Jakub Śmiechowski	(Poland) Inter Europol Competition	(Germany) Florian Schnitzenbaumer
5	10	(Czech Republic) Brno Circuit, Brno	14 September	(Switzerland) Marcel Tobler	(Switzerland) Marcel Tobler	(Poland) Jakub Śmiechowski	(Poland) Inter Europol Competition	(Germany) Florian Schnitzenbaumer
6	11	(Italy) Autodromo Enzo e Dino Ferrari, Imola	26 September	(Switzerland) Thomas Amweg	(Switzerland) Thomas Amweg	(Switzerland) Thomas Amweg	(Switzerland) Jo Zeller Racing	(France) Sylvain Warnecke
6	12	(Italy) Autodromo Enzo e Dino Ferrari, Imola	27 September	(Switzerland) Thomas Amweg	(Poland) Jakub Śmiechowski	(Switzerland) Thomas Amweg	(Switzerland) Jo Zeller Racing	(France) Sylvain Warnecke
7	13	(Germany) Hockenheimring, Hockenheim	10 October	(Switzerland) Thomas Amweg	(Poland) Jakub Śmiechowski	(Poland) Jakub Śmiechowski	(Poland) Inter Europol Competition	(France) Sylvain Warnecke
7	14	(Germany) Hockenheimring, Hockenheim	11 October	(Switzerland) Thomas Amweg	(Switzerland) Marcel Tobler	(Switzerland) Thomas Amweg	(Switzerland) Jo Zeller Racing	(France) Sylvain Warnecke

== Championship standings ==
Position	1st	2nd	3rd	4th	5th	6th	7th	8th	9th	10th
Cup	20	18	15	12	10	8	6	4	2	1

=== Cup ===
Pos	Driver	RBR (Austria)		SAL (Austria)		HOC (Germany)		MOS (Czech Republic)		BRN (Czech Republic)		IMO (Italy)		HOC (Germany)		Pts
1	(Switzerland) Thomas Amweg	1	2	1	1	1	1	1	1			1	1	3	1	283
2	(Poland) Jakub Śmiechowski							2	4	1	1	2	2	1	3	156
2	(Switzerland) Marcel Tobler					3	3	3	2	3	2	4	4	2	2	156
4	(Germany) Florian Schnitzenbaumer	4	8	3	4	4	6	4	3	2	3			4	Ret	135
5	(Germany) Christian Zeller	7	5	DNP	3	5	4							5	4	75
6	(Austria) Franz Wöss	5	Ret	5	5			8	5	5	Ret			6	6	70
7	(Germany) Andreas Germann	8	7	4	6	6	5							10	5	59
8	(Austria) Manfred Lang					7	8	5	6	4	4					52
9	(Austria) Christopher Höher	2	1													43
10	(Germany) Dr. Ulrich Drechsler	10	10					7	8			6	5	8	8	38
11	(Austria) Josef Neuhauser			2	2											36
11	(Germany) Maximilian Hackl					2	2									36
11	(France) Sylvain Warnecke							6	7			5	6	9	9	36
14	(Austria) Stefan Neuburger	3	3													30
14	(Switzerland) Nikolaj Rogivue											3	3			30
16	(Italy) Enrico Milani	6	4													20
16	(Germany) Angelique Germann	11	9	Ret	7	Ret	Ret							7	7	20
18	(Switzerland) Willi Sträuli					8	7									10
19	(Italy) Giorgio Venica	DNP	6													8
20	(Italy) Paolo Vagaggini	9	11													2
21	(Finland) Jani Tammi													DNP	DNP	0

=== Trophy ===
Pos	Driver	RBR (Austria)		SAL (Austria)		HOC (Germany)		MOS (Czech Republic)		BRN (Czech Republic)		IMO (Italy)		HOC (Germany)		Pts
1	(Germany) Florian Schnitzenbaumer	4	8	3	4	4	6	4	3	2	3					243
2	(France) Sylvain Warnecke							6	7			5	6	9	9	136
3	(Germany) Dr. Ulrich Drechsler	10	10													33
19	(Italy) Giorgio Venica	DNP	6													25

=== Swiss F3 Cup ===
Pos	Driver	RBR (Austria)		SAL (Austria)		MOS (Czech Republic)		IMO (Italy)		HOC (Germany)		Pts
1	(Switzerland) Thomas Amweg	1	2	1	1	1	1	1	1	3	1	243
2	(Switzerland) Marcel Tobler					3	2	4	4	2	2	115
3	(Switzerland) Nikolaj Rogivue							3	3			30
4	(Switzerland) Willi Sträuli											0
