= Austria Formula 3 Cup =

Motor racing competition

- Category: Single-seaters
- Country: Austria
- Inaugural season: 1982
- Constructors: Dallara, Opel, Fiat
- Drivers' champion: (Switzerland) Sandro Zeller
- Official website: afr-pokale.com (German)

The Austria Formula 3 Cup is an open wheel racing series based in Austria. The series has run since 1982 and regular visits such circuits as the Salzburgring and the Red Bull Ring in Austria, the Autodrom Most and the Brno Circuit in the Czech Republic and the Hockenheimring in Germany. It's now called the "Drexler-Automotive Formel 3 Pokal" for the main Cup and "Drexler-Automotive Formel 3 Trophy" for the B division older chassis cars.

== Scoring system ==
2009 scoring system for finishing
Position	1st	2nd	3rd	4th	5th	6th	7th	8th
Points	10	8	6	5	4	3	2	1

2010 scoring system for finishing
Position	1st	2nd	3rd	4th	5th	6th	7th	8th	9th	10th
Points	20	15	12	10	8	6	4	3	2	1

== Champions ==
Season	Formula 3 Cup Champion	Team & Car/Engine	Formula 3 Trophy Champion	Team & Car/Engine
1982	(Austria) Johann Reindl	(Austria) Walter Lechner Racing School - Ralt RT3 Toyota		
1983	No Championship			
1984	(Austria) Ernst Franzmeier	(Austria) Team Lechner Racing School - Ralt RT3 Volkswagen		
1985	(Austria) Willi Schuster	(Austria) Team Lechner Racing School - Ralt RT3 Volkswagen		
1986	(Austria) Franz Theuermann	(Austria) Team Lechner Racing School - Ralt RT3 Volkswagen		
1987	(Austria) Franz Binder	(Austria) Bross Druck Chemie Racing - Reynard 863 Volkswagen		
1988	(Austria) Karl Wendlinger	(Austria) Krafft Walzen Team - Ralt RT32 Alfa Romeo		
1989	(Austria) Josef Neuhauser	(Austria) MSC Aschau - Reynard 873 Volkswagen		
1990	(Austria) Josef Neuhauser	(Austria) MSC Aschau - Reynard 893 Volkswagen		
1991	(Austria) Josef Neuhauser	(Austria) Mönninghoff Sport Promotion - Reynard 903 Volkswagen		
1992	(Austria) Philipp Peter	(Switzerland) Jacques Isler Racing - Dallara F392 Alfa Romeo		
1993	(Italy) Massimiliano Angelelli	(Germany) BSR Volkswagen Motorsport - Dallara F393 Volkswagen		
1994	(Austria) Alexander Wurz	(Austria) G+M Escom Motorsport - Dallara F394 Opel	(Austria) Ewald Kapferer	(Austria) Franz Wöss Racing
1995	(Austria) Josef Neuhauser	(Austria) Achleitner Motorsport - Dallara F394 Opel	(Austria) Georg Holzer	(Austria) Franz Wöss Racing
1996	(Austria) Josef Neuhauser	(Austria) Achleitner Motorsport - Dallara F394 Opel	(Austria) Christian Windhofer	Dallara F388 Toyota
1997	(Czech Republic) Petr Krizan	(Austria) Franz Wöss Racing - Dallara F394 Opel	(Austria) Georg Holzer	(Austria) Franz Wöss Racing - Ralt RT35 Volkswagen
1998	(Germany) Andre Fibier	(Austria) Franz Wöss Racing - Dallara F395 Opel	(Germany) Jörg Sandek	(Germany) Silval Color - Dallara F393 Opel
1999	(Germany) Andre Fibier	(Austria) Franz Wöss Racing - Dallara F398 Opel	(Austria) Christian Eigl	(Austria) privateer - Dallara F394 Opel
2000	(Austria) Marco Schärf	(Austria) Fritz Kopp Racing - Dallara F398 Opel	(Germany) Reimund Scheidenfaden	(Germany) privateer - Dallara F394 Opel
2001	(Italy) Diego Romanini	(Austria) Franz Wöss Racing - Dallara F399 Opel	(Italy) Luca lannaccone	(Germany) Jenichen Motorsport - Dallara F396 Opel
2002	(Austria) Hannes Neuhauser	(Austria) Achleitner Motorsport - Dallara F394 Opel	(Austria) Hannes Neuhauser	(Austria) Achleitner Motorsport - Dallara F394 Opel
2003	(Italy) Diego Romanini	(Germany) JMS Jenichen Motorsport - Dallara F399 Opel	(Germany) Jörg Sandek	(Germany) JMS Jenichen Motorsport - Dallara F394 Fiat
2004	(Germany) Jan Seyffarth	(Germany) SMS Seyffarth Motorsport - Dallara F302 Renault	(Switzerland) Jürg Felix	(Switzerland) Formel Vau Club Schweiz - Dallara 397 Fiat
2005	(Germany) Florian Schnitzenbaumer	(Austria) Franz Wöss Racing - Dallara F399 Opel	(Switzerland) Jürg Felix	(Switzerland) Formel Vau Club Schweiz - Dallara F397 Fiat
2006	(Latvia) Harald Schlegelmilch	(Austria) HS Technik Motorsport - Dallara F304 Opel	(Austria) Michael Aberer	(Austria) privateer - Dallara F394 Opel
2007	(Austria) Stefan Neuburger	(Austria) Franz Wöss Racing - Dallara F304 Opel	(Germany) Klaus Dieter Häckel	(Germany) Auto Häckel Motorsport - Dallara F394 Opel
2008	(Austria) Patrick Tiller	(Germany) Jenichen Motorsport - Dallara F304 Opel	(Poland) Maurycy Kochanski	(Poland) privateer - Dallara F395 Honda Mugen
2009	(Italy) Francesco Lopez	(Austria) Franz Wöss Racing - Dallara F304 Opel	No Championship	
2010	(Switzerland) Philippe Chuard	(Switzerland) privateer - Dallara F302 Opel	No Championship	
2011	(Switzerland) Sandro Zeller	(Switzerland) Jo Zeller Racing - Dallara F307 Mercedes	(Switzerland) Marcel Tobler	(Switzerland) Jo Zeller Racing - Dallara F300 Opel
2012	(Germany) André Rudersdorf	(Germany) ma-con Motorsport - Dallara F305 Volkswagen	(Switzerland) Daniel Roider	(Switzerland) Jo Zeller Racing - Dallara F399 Opel
2013	(Austria) Christopher Höher	(Austria) Franz Wöss Racing - Dallara F305 Opel-Spiess	(Germany) Dr. Ulrich Drechsler	(Germany) Team Harder Motorsport - Dallara F302 Opel-Spiess
2014	(Switzerland) Thomas Amweg	(Switzerland) Jo Zeller Racing - Dallara F305 Mercedes	(Germany) Florian Schnitzenbaumer	(Austria) Franz Wöss Racing - Dallara F302 Spiess
2015	(Belgium) Jordi Weckx	(Germany) Rennsport Rössler - Dallara F308 Volkswagen	(Germany) Jörg Sandek	(Germany) Team Harder Motorsport - Dallara F302 Opel-Spiess
2016	(Switzerland) Sandro Zeller	(Switzerland) Jo Zeller Racing - Dallara F308 Mercedes	(Germany) Jörg Sandek	(Germany) Team Harder Motorsport - Dallara F302 Opel-Spiess
2017	(Switzerland) Sandro Zeller	(Switzerland) Jo Zeller Racing - Dallara F308 Mercedes & Dallara F306 Mercedes	(Switzerland) Sandro Zeller	(Switzerland) Jo Zeller Racing - Dallara F306 Mercedes
2018	(Switzerland) Sandro Zeller	(Switzerland) Jo Zeller Racing - Dallara F306 Mercedes	(Switzerland) Sandro Zeller	(Switzerland) Jo Zeller Racing - Dallara F306 Mercedes
2019	(Switzerland) Sandro Zeller	(Switzerland) Jo Zeller Racing - Dallara F308 Mercedes	(Switzerland) Florian Münger	(Switzerland) Jo Zeller Racing - Dallara F306 Mercedes
2020	(Switzerland) Sandro Zeller	(Switzerland) Jo Zeller Racing - Dallara F312 Mercedes	(Germany) Dr. Ralph Pütz	(Austria) Franz Wöss Racing - Dallara F305 Opel-Spiess
2021	(Switzerland) Sandro Zeller	(Switzerland) Jo Zeller Racing - Dallara F312 Mercedes	(Germany) Dr. Ralph Pütz	(Austria) Franz Wöss Racing - Dallara F305 Opel-Spiess
2022	(Switzerland) Sandro Zeller	(Switzerland) Jo Zeller Racing - Dallara F312 Mercedes	No Championship	
2023	(Hungary) Benjámin Berta	(Austria) Franz Wöss Racing - Dallara F316 Mercedes	(Switzerland) Marcel Tobler	(Austria) Jo Zeller Racing - Dallara F308 Mercedes
2024	(Hungary) Benjámin Berta	(Austria) Franz Wöss Racing - Dallara 320 Mercedes	(Switzerland) Marcel Tobler	(Austria) Jo Zeller Racing - Dallara F308 Mercedes HWA
2025	(Switzerland) Sandro Zeller	(Switzerland) Jo Zeller Racing - Dallara F312 Mercedes HWA	(Germany) André Petropoulos	(Austria) Jo Zeller Racing - Dallara F316 Opel Spiess

== See also ==
- Formula Three
