= 2013 Remus F3 Cup =

Motor racing competition

Seasons
- ← 2012 2014 →

The 2013 Remus F3 Cup was the 32nd Austria Formula 3 Cup season and the first Remus F3 Cup season.

Despite missing the last round, Christopher Höher of Franz Wöss Racing was crowned champion by 118 points over Jo Zeller Racing driver Thomas Amweg. Höher was only 16 years old at the end of the season. Dr. Ulrich Drechsler became the Trophy class champion for the first time.

== Teams and drivers ==
All Cup cars were built between 2005 and 2011, while Trophy cars were built between 1992 and 2004.

Team	Chassis	Engine	No.	Driver	Class	Rounds
(Austria) Franz Wöss Racing	Dallara F302	Opel-Spiess	1	(Austria) Franz Wöss	T	2–3
(Austria) Franz Wöss Racing	Dallara F308	Opel-Spiess	1	(Austria) Franz Wöss	C	6
(Austria) Franz Wöss Racing	Dallara F305	Opel-Spiess	2	(Austria) Christopher Höher	C	1–6
(Austria) Franz Wöss Racing	Dallara F305	Opel-Spiess	57	(Germany) Maximilian Hackl	C	3
(Austria) Franz Wöss Racing	Dallara F305	Opel-Spiess	3	(Germany) Maximilian Hackl	C	1
(Austria) Franz Wöss Racing	Dallara F302	Opel-Spiess	3	(Austria) Florian Schnitzenbaumer	T	4
(Switzerland) Jo Zeller Racing	Dallara F308	Mercedes	4	(Switzerland) Marcel Tobler	C	1–5, 7
(Switzerland) Jo Zeller Racing	Dallara F305	Mercedes	5	(Switzerland) Thomas Amweg	C	1–5, 7
(Switzerland) Jo Zeller Racing	Dallara F399	Opel-Spiess	21	(Switzerland) Daniel Roider	T	4, 7
(Germany) CR-Racing Team	Dallara F305	Opel-Spiess	6	(Germany) Andreas Germann	C	1, 7
(Switzerland) Sträuli Motorsport	Dallara F306	Mercedes	8	(Switzerland) Willi Sträuli	C	4, 6
(Italy) MI-VA Motorsport	Dallara F308	Fiat-FPT	17	(Italy) Paolo Vaggiagini	C	2, 6
(Italy) MI-VA Motorsport	Dallara F308	Fiat-FPT	19	(Italy) Enrico Milani	C	2, 6
(Italy) Puresport Team	Dallara F302	Mugen-Honda	18	(Italy) Giorgio Venica	T	2
(Switzerland) Philippe Chuard	Dallara F302	Opel-Spiess	22	(Switzerland) Philippe Chuard	T	2, 4–5, 7
(Germany) BSR	Dallara F300	Opel-Spiess	24	(Germany) Heinz Baltensperger	T	1
(Germany) Heinz Scherle	Reynard 873	Volkswagen	27	(Germany) Heinz Scherle	T	7
(France) Sylvain Warnecke	Dallara F302	Opel-Spiess	28	(France) Sylvain Warnecke	T	3–7
(Germany) Team Harder Motorsport	Dallara F302	Opel-Spiess	29	(Germany) Dr. Ulrich Drechsler	T	All
(Germany) TTCmotorsport	Dallara F305	Mercedes	65	(Germany) Hubertus-Carlos Vier	C	1

Icon	Class
C	Cup
T	Trophy

== Calendar and race results ==
R.	RN	Circuit	Date	Pole position	Fastest lap	Winning driver	Winning team	Trophy winner
1	1	(Germany) Hockenheimring, Hockenheim	7 April	(Austria) Christopher Höher	(Austria) Christopher Höher	(Austria) Christopher Höher	(Austria) Franz Wöss Racing	(Germany) Dr. Ulrich Drechsler
1	2	(Germany) Hockenheimring, Hockenheim	7 April	(Austria) Christopher Höher	(Germany) Hubertus-Carlos Vier	(Austria) Christopher Höher	(Austria) Franz Wöss Racing	(Germany) Dr. Ulrich Drechsler
2	3	(Austria) Red Bull Ring, Spielberg	12 May	(Austria) Christopher Höher	(Austria) Christopher Höher	(Austria) Christopher Höher	(Austria) Franz Wöss Racing	(Switzerland) Philippe Chuard
2	4	(Austria) Red Bull Ring, Spielberg	12 May	(Austria) Christopher Höher	(Austria) Christopher Höher	(Austria) Christopher Höher	(Austria) Franz Wöss Racing	(Switzerland) Philippe Chuard
3	5	(Germany) Lausitzring, Klettwitz	2 June	(Austria) Christopher Höher	(Austria) Christopher Höher	(Austria) Christopher Höher	(Austria) Franz Wöss Racing	(France) Sylvain Warnecke
3	6	(Germany) Lausitzring, Klettwitz	2 June	(Austria) Christopher Höher	(Austria) Christopher Höher	(Austria) Christopher Höher	(Austria) Franz Wöss Racing	(France) Sylvain Warnecke
4	7	(Austria) Salzburgring, Salzburg	7 July	(Austria) Christopher Höher	(Austria) Christopher Höher	(Austria) Christopher Höher	(Austria) Franz Wöss Racing	(Switzerland) Philippe Chuard
4	8	(Austria) Salzburgring, Salzburg	7 July	(Austria) Christopher Höher	(Austria) Christopher Höher	(Austria) Christopher Höher	(Austria) Franz Wöss Racing	(Germany) Florian Schnitzenbaumer
5	9	(Germany) Hockenheimring, Hockenheim	28 July	(Austria) Christopher Höher	(Austria) Christopher Höher	(Austria) Christopher Höher	(Austria) Franz Wöss Racing	(Switzerland) Philippe Chuard
5	10	(Germany) Hockenheimring, Hockenheim	28 July	(Austria) Christopher Höher	(Austria) Christopher Höher	(Austria) Christopher Höher	(Austria) Franz Wöss Racing	(Switzerland) Philippe Chuard
6	11	(Czech Republic) Autodrom Most, Most	11 August	(Austria) Christopher Höher	(Austria) Christopher Höher	(Austria) Christopher Höher	(Austria) Franz Wöss Racing	(Austria) Franz Wöss
6	12	(Czech Republic) Autodrom Most, Most	11 August	(Austria) Christopher Höher	(Austria) Christopher Höher	(Austria) Christopher Höher	(Austria) Franz Wöss Racing	(Austria) Franz Wöss
7	13	(Germany) Hockenheimring, Hockenheim	12 September	(Switzerland) Thomas Amweg	(Switzerland) Thomas Amweg	(Switzerland) Thomas Amweg	(Switzerland) Jo Zeller Racing	(Switzerland) Philippe Chuard
7	14	(Germany) Hockenheimring, Hockenheim	12 September	(Switzerland) Thomas Amweg	(Switzerland) Thomas Amweg	(Switzerland) Thomas Amweg	(Switzerland) Jo Zeller Racing	(Switzerland) Philippe Chuard
