= 2019 BOSS GP Series =

The 2019 BOSS GP season was the 25th season of the BOSS GP series. The championship began on 28 April at Hockenheim and finished on 13 October at Imola.

== Teams and Drivers ==
Team	Chassis	Engine	No.	Driver	Rounds
Open Class
Top Speed	Toro Rosso STR1	Cosworth TJ2005 3.0 L V10	1	(Austria) Ingo Gerstl	All
Speed Center	Forti FG03	Judd GV 4.0 L V10	5	(Germany) Hans Laub	4
ESBA Racing	Benetton B197	Judd GV 4.0 L V10	7	(Germany) Ulf Ehninger	1–2, 4, 6
Penn Elcom Racing	Dallara GP2/11	Judd GV 4.0 L V10	8	(United States) Phil Stratford	1
Penn Elcom Racing	Benetton B197	Judd GV 4.0 L V10	8	(United States) Phil Stratford	2–3, 6
Ray-Ban	Dallara T08	Renault V4Y 3.5 L V6	111	(France) 'Piter'	1, 3–4, 6
Formula Class
Zig-Zag	Lola B05/52	Gibson ZG348 3.4 L V8	16	(Monaco) Nicolas Matile	5–6
Zig-Zag	Dallara GP2/08	Mecachrome V8108 4.0 L V8	29	(Monaco) Marc Faggionato	5–6
Top Speed	Dallara GP2/11	Mecachrome V8108 4.0 L V8	19	(Austria) Christopher Höher	5
Top Speed	Dallara GP2/08	Mecachrome V8108 4.0 L V8	44	(Austria) Thomas Jakoubek	1–3, 5
Top Speed	Dallara GP2/11	Mecachrome V8108 4.0 L V8	69	(Italy) Salvatore De Plano	1–4, 6
Top Speed	Dallara GP2/08	Mecachrome V8108 4.0 L V8	88	(Germany) Florian Schnitzenbaumer	2, 5
MM International Motorsport	Dallara GP2/11	Mecachrome V8108 4.0 L V8	21	(Italy) Gianluca Ripoli	All
MM International Motorsport	Dallara GP2/05	Mecachrome V8108 4.0 L V8	35	(Italy) Armando Mangini	1–4, 6
MM International Motorsport	Dallara GP2/11	Mecachrome V8108 4.0 L V8	37	(Italy) Luca Martucci	All
Scuderia Palladio	Dallara GP2/11	Mecachrome V8108 4.0 L V8	27	(Italy) Marco Ghiotto	All
Scuderia Palladio	Dallara GP2/05	Mecachrome V8108 4.0 L V8	28	(Italy) Sergio Ghiotto	1–3
Speed Center	Dallara GP2/11	Mecachrome V8108 4.0 L V8	31	(Italy) Alessandro Bracalente	All
Speed Center	Dallara GP2/08	Mecachrome V8108 4.0 L V8	33	(Switzerland) Peter Göllner	All
Speed Center	Dallara GP2/08	Mecachrome V8108 4.0 L V8	55	(Switzerland) Christian Eicke	All
Speed Center	Dallara GP2/11	Mecachrome V8108 4.0 L V8	77	(France) Philippe Haezebrouck	3–6
Inter Europol Competition	Dallara GP2/05	Mecachrome V8108 4.0 L V8	47	(Germany) Walter Steding	All
Inter Europol Competition	Dallara GP2/11	Mecachrome V8108 4.0 L V8	77	(France) Philippe Haezebrouck	1–2
Fiedler Racing	Dallara GP2/05	Mecachrome V8108 4.0 L V8	66	(Germany) Andreas Fiedler	All

== Calendar ==
Round		Circuit	Date	Pole position	Fastest lap	Winning driver	Winning team	Formula Class Winner
1	R1	(Germany) Hockenheimring, Hockenheim	28 April	(Austria) Ingo Gerstl	(Italy) Salvatore de Plano	(Austria) Ingo Gerstl	(Austria) Top Speed	(Germany) Andreas Fiedler
1	R2	(Germany) Hockenheimring, Hockenheim	28 April		(Austria) Ingo Gerstl	(Austria) Ingo Gerstl	(Austria) Top Speed	(Germany) Andreas Fiedler
2	R3	(Austria) Red Bull Ring, Spielberg	24 May	(United States) Phil Stratford	(Austria) Ingo Gerstl	(Italy) Alessandro Bracalente	(Switzerland) Speed Center	(Italy) Alessandro Bracalente
2	R4	(Austria) Red Bull Ring, Spielberg	25 May		(Austria) Ingo Gerstl	(Austria) Ingo Gerstl	(Austria) Top Speed	(Italy) Alessandro Bracalente
3	R5	(Italy) Autodromo Nazionale Monza, Monza	15 June	(Austria) Ingo Gerstl	(Austria) Ingo Gerstl	(United States) Phil Stratford	(United States) Penn Elcom Racing	(Italy) Marco Giotto
3	R6	(Italy) Autodromo Nazionale Monza, Monza	16 June		(Austria) Ingo Gerstl	(Austria) Ingo Gerstl	(Austria) Top Speed	(Italy) Marco Giotto
4	R7	(Netherlands) TT Circuit Assen, Assen	20 July	(Austria) Ingo Gerstl	(Austria) Ingo Gerstl	(Austria) Ingo Gerstl	(Austria) Top Speed	(Italy) Gianluca Ripoli
4	R8	(Netherlands) TT Circuit Assen, Assen	21 July		(Austria) Ingo Gerstl	(Austria) Ingo Gerstl	(Austria) Top Speed	(Italy) Alessandro Bracalente
5	R9	(Czech Republic) Masaryk Circuit, Brno	7 September	(Austria) Ingo Gerstl	(Austria) Ingo Gerstl	(Austria) Ingo Gerstl	(Austria) Top Speed	(Austria) Christopher Höher
5	R10	(Czech Republic) Masaryk Circuit, Brno	8 September		(Germany) Andreas Fiedler	(Austria) Ingo Gerstl	(Austria) Top Speed	(Austria) Christopher Höher
6	R11	(Italy) Autodromo Enzo e Dino Ferrari, Imola	12 October	(Austria) Ingo Gerstl	(Austria) Ingo Gerstl	(Austria) Ingo Gerstl	(Austria) Top Speed	(Italy) Alessandro Bracalente
6	R12	(Italy) Autodromo Enzo e Dino Ferrari, Imola	13 October		(Austria) Ingo Gerstl	(Austria) Ingo Gerstl	(Austria) Top Speed	(Italy) Alessandro Bracalente

- ^1 Round 1 was originally scheduled for 27 April, but was postponed due to heavy rain.

== Championship standings ==
- Points for both championships were awarded as follows:

Race
Position	1st	2nd	3rd	4th	5th	6th	7th	8th	9th	10th	11th	12th	13th	14th	15th	16th	17th
All Races	25	22	20	18	16	14	12	10	9	8	7	6	5	4	3	2	1

=== Drivers Standings ===
Pos	Driver	HOC (Germany)		RBR (Austria)		MNZ (Italy)		ASS (Netherlands)		BRN (Czech Republic)		IMO (Italy)		Points
Open Class
1	(Austria) Ingo Gerstl	1	1	Ret	1	2	1	1	1	1	1	1	1	272
2	(France) 'Piter'	12	10			12	Ret	7	12			DNS	12	126
3	(United States) Phil Stratford	DNS	DNS	5	2	1	Ret					DNS	DNS	72
4	(Germany) Hans Laub							6	10					44
5	(Germany) Ulf Ehninger	DNS	DNS	9	DNS			Ret	DNS			Ret	DNS	22
Formula Class
1	(Italy) Marco Ghiotto	3	5	4	4	3	2	Ret	3	3	3	3	3	240
2	(Italy) Alessandro Bracalente	4	3	1	3	Ret	3	3	2	4	Ret	2	2	231
3	(Germany) Andreas Fiedler	2	2	DNS	Ret	4	4	10	8	5	5	6	6	184
4	(France) Philippe Haezebrouck	13	6	6	8	6	8	5	5	6	6	8	7	177
5	(Italy) Luca Martucci	Ret	Ret	3	Ret	5	5	8	4	9	4	4	4	164
6	(Italy) Gianluca Ripoli	5	8	8	Ret	7	6	2	6	10	7	Ret	8	150
7	(Italy) Armando Mangini	6	7	14	6	11	12	4	7			DNS	DNS	104
8	(Italy) Salvatore de Plano	8	4	7	DNS	Ret	7	Ret	14			5	5	103
9	(Germany) Walter Steding	9	Ret	12	Ret	8	10	9	11	11	8	9	Ret	94
10	(Switzerland) Christian Eicke	10	12	13	10	Ret	9	DNS	9	12	13	12	11	82
11	(Switzerland) Peter Göllner	11	11	10	DNS	Ret	11	11	13	DNS	9	11	9	81
12	(Austria) Thomas Jakoubek	7	9	11	9	9	DNS			13	10			72
13	(Austria) Christopher Höher									2	2			50
14	(Italy) Sergio Ghiotto	DNS	DNS	2	7	10	DNS							48
15	(Germany) Florian Schnitzenbaumer			Ret	5					7	11			42
16	(Monaco) Nicolas Matile									8	12	10	10	37
17	(Monaco) Marc Faggionato									Ret	Ret	7	Ret	14
Pos	Driver	HOC (Germany)		RBR (Austria)		MNZ (Italy)		ASS (Netherlands)		BRN (Czech Republic)		IMO (Italy)		Points
