= Christopher Höher =

Austrian racing driver (born 1997)

- Nationality: Austrian
- Born: 19 May 1997 (age 29) Villach, Austria

BOSS GP career
- Debut season: 2016
- Current team: Top Speed
- Categorisation: FIA Silver
- Car number: 19
- Starts: 12
- Wins: 6
- Poles: 5
- Fastest laps: 6
- Best finish: 8th in 2020

Previous series
- 2017 2014–15 2013–14 2013 2011, 13–15: ADAC GT Masters; GP3 Series; Euroformula Open Championship; ATS F3 Cup; Austria Formula 3 Cup

Championship titles
- 2013: Austria Formula 3 Cup

Christopher Höher (born 19 May 1997) is an Austrian former racing driver.

== Career ==
=== Formula 3 ===
Höher began his career in racing in 2011 in a Dallara 302 Opel Spiess for Franz Wöss Racing at the Austria Formula 3 Cup at the age of 13. His career took off in 2013, two years later, winning the Austria Formula 3 Cup with twelve victories out of fourteen races and also competing in races in the German Formula 3 and European F3 Open series. In total, he took part in five races that do not score any points. In the fight for the German Formula 3 trophy, he stood three times on the second step of the podium and eventually was classified in tenth position. In the 2014 season, Höher decided to continue racing in Euroformula Open Championship. During the second race at Monza stood on the podium. He collected a total of 35 points, which gave him the fourteenth place in the final drivers' standings.

=== GP3 Series ===
In the 2014 GP3 Series, season Höher replaced Hong Kong-based Adderly Fong at Jenzer Motorsport for the rounds at the Hungaroring, as Fong had a race in the Audi R8 LMS Cup that weekend. In both races, he came in the 23rd position. He was classified 36th in the final drivers' standings. In the 2015 GP3 Series season, Höher raced at the Silverstone rounds for the Campos Racing team finishing 23rd and 24th.

=== ADAC GT Masters ===
Höher participated in the Junior Class of the 2017 ADAC GT Masters season with Audi Sport Racing Academy, sharing the No. 9 Audi R8 LMS with Elia Erhart. He finished 15th in the Junior Class standings, scoring 35 points.

=== BOSS GP ===
Höher has been competing in BOSS GP since 2016. He drove in the 2016, 2019 and 2020 seasons for Top Speed in the Formula Class, driving Dallara GP2 cars. He would again compete for Top Speed in the Formula class in an ex-GP2 Dallara GP2/11.

== Racing record ==
=== Career Summary ===
Season	Series	Team	Races	Wins	Poles	F/Laps	Podiums	Points	Position
2011	Austria Formula 3 Cup	Franz Wöss Racing	12	0	?	?	0	63	5th
2013	Remus F3 Cup	Franz Wöss Racing	12	12	12	11	12	300	**1st**
2013	German Formula 3 Championship - Trophy	Franz Wöss Racing	3	0	0	0	3	44	10th
2013	German Formula 3 Championship	Franz Wöss Racing	3	0	0	0	0	0	NC
2013	European F3 Open Championship	Team West-Tec F3	2	0	0	0	0	0	NC
2014	Remus F3 Cup	Franz Wöss Racing	2	0	0	0	2	43	9th
2014	GP3 Series	Jenzer Motorsport	2	0	0	0	0	0	36th
2014	Euroformula Open Winter Series	Team West-Tec	1	0	0	0	0	0	NC
2014	Euroformula Open Championship	BVM Racing	8	0	0	0	1	35	14th
2015	GP3 Series	Campos Racing	2	0	0	0	0	0	31st
2015	Remus F3 Cup	Franz Wöss Racing	6	2	3	3	5	113	5th
2016	BOSS GP - Formula Class	Top Speed	6	2	4	3	3	72	14th
2017	ADAC GT Masters	Audi Sport racing academy	14	0	0	0	0	0	NC
2019	BOSS GP - Formula Class	Top Speed	2	2	1	1	2	50	13th
2020	BOSS GP - Formula Class	Top Speed	4	2	0	2	2	68	8th

=== Complete GP3 Series results ===
(key) (Races in bold indicate pole position) (Races in italics indicate fastest lap)

Year	Entrant	1	2	3	4	5	6	7	8	9	10	11	12	13	14	15	16	17	18	Pos.	Pts
2014	Jenzer Motorsport	CAT; FEA	CAT; SPR	RBR; FEA	RBR; SPR	SIL; FEA	SIL; SPR	HOC; FEA	HOC; SPR	HUN; FEA; 23	HUN; SPR; 23	SPA; FEA	SPA; SPR	MNZ; FEA	MNZ; SPR	SOC; FEA	SOC; SPR	YMC; FEA	YMC; SPR	36th	0
2015	Campos Racing	CAT; FEA	CAT; SPR	RBR; FEA	RBR; SPR	SIL; FEA; 23	SIL; SPR; 24	HUN; FEA	HUN; SPR	SPA; FEA	SPA; SPR	MNZ; FEA	MNZ; SPR	SOC; FEA	SOC; SPR	BHR; FEA	BHR; SPR	YMC; FEA	YMC; SPR	31st	0

== Bibliography ==
- Christopher Höher career summary at DriverDB.com
