= 2017 ADAC GT Masters =

Motorsport season

The 2017 ADAC GT Masters was the eleventh season of the ADAC GT Masters, the grand tourer-style sports car racing founded by the German automobile club ADAC. The season started on 29 April at Motorsport Arena Oschersleben and ended on 24 September at Hockenheim after seven double-header meetings.

== Entry list ==
Team	Car	No.	Driver	Status	Rounds
(Germany) Montaplast by Land-Motorsport	Audi R8 LMS	1	(Germany) Christopher Mies		All
(Germany) Montaplast by Land-Motorsport	Audi R8 LMS	1	(United States) Connor De Phillippi		All
(Germany) Montaplast by Land-Motorsport	Audi R8 LMS	2	(Germany) Christopher Haase		All
(Germany) Montaplast by Land-Motorsport	Audi R8 LMS	2	(Switzerland) Jeffrey Schmidt	J	All
(Germany) Aust Motorsport	Audi R8 LMS	3	(South Africa) Kelvin van der Linde		All
(Germany) Aust Motorsport	Audi R8 LMS	3	(Germany) Markus Pommer		1–5, 7
(Germany) Aust Motorsport	Audi R8 LMS	3	(South Africa) Sheldon van der Linde	J	6
(Germany) Aust Motorsport	Audi R8 LMS	4	(Germany) Dennis Marschall	J	All
(Germany) Aust Motorsport	Audi R8 LMS	4	(Switzerland) Patric Niederhauser		All
(Austria) HB Racing WDS Bau	Lamborghini Huracán GT3	6	(Germany) Florian Spengler		All
(Austria) HB Racing WDS Bau	Lamborghini Huracán GT3	6	(Switzerland) Christopher Zanella		All
(Austria) HB Racing WDS Bau	Lamborghini Huracán GT3	7	(Italy) Marco Mapelli		All
(Austria) HB Racing WDS Bau	Lamborghini Huracán GT3	7	(Austria) Norbert Siedler		All
(Germany) Audi Sport racing academy	Audi R8 LMS	8	(Switzerland) Ricardo Feller	J	All
(Germany) Audi Sport racing academy	Audi R8 LMS	8	(Sweden) Mikaela Åhlin-Kottulinsky	J	1–6
(Germany) Audi Sport racing academy	Audi R8 LMS	8	(Germany) Pierre Kaffer		7
(Germany) Audi Sport racing academy	Audi R8 LMS	9	(Germany) Elia Erhart		All
(Germany) Audi Sport racing academy	Audi R8 LMS	9	(Austria) Christopher Höher	J	All
(Czech Republic) Šenkýř Motorsport	BMW M6 GT3	11	(Austria) Michael Fischer	J	3
(Czech Republic) Šenkýř Motorsport	BMW M6 GT3	11	(Czech Republic) Jakub Knoll		3
(Austria) RWT Racing	Corvette C7 GT3-R	13	(Germany) Sven Barth	T	All
(Austria) RWT Racing	Corvette C7 GT3-R	13	(Germany) Maximilian Hackländer		All
(Germany) KÜS TEAM75 Bernhard	Porsche 911 GT3 R	17	(Germany) Michael Ammermüller		All
(Germany) KÜS TEAM75 Bernhard	Porsche 911 GT3 R	17	(France) Mathieu Jaminet		All
(Germany) KÜS TEAM75 Bernhard	Porsche 911 GT3 R	18	(Germany) Christopher Friedrich	J	All
(Germany) KÜS TEAM75 Bernhard	Porsche 911 GT3 R	18	(Belgium) Adrien De Leener		All
(Austria) GRT Grasser Racing Team	Lamborghini Huracán GT3	19	(Italy) Mirko Bortolotti		1–5, 7
(Austria) GRT Grasser Racing Team	Lamborghini Huracán GT3	19	(Argentina) Ezequiel Pérez Companc	J	1–5, 7
(Austria) GRT Grasser Racing Team	Lamborghini Huracán GT3	63	(Germany) Christian Engelhart		1–5, 7
(Austria) GRT Grasser Racing Team	Lamborghini Huracán GT3	63	(Switzerland) Rolf Ineichen	T	1–5, 7
(Germany) / Mercedes-AMG Team Zakspeed (Note: Both cars entered as Mercedes-AMG Team Zakspeed from Rounds 1 to 6, but at Round 7 both cars entered as Team Zakspeed. This happened after Mercedes-AMG terminated its contract with the team, following the double disqualifications at the Sachsenring.); (Germany) / Team Zakspeed	Mercedes-AMG GT3	20	(Denmark) Nicolai Sylvest	J	All
(Germany) / Mercedes-AMG Team Zakspeed; (Germany) / Team Zakspeed	Mercedes-AMG GT3	20	(Switzerland) Nikolaj Rogivue	J	1–5, 7
(Germany) / Mercedes-AMG Team Zakspeed; (Germany) / Team Zakspeed	Mercedes-AMG GT3	20	(Netherlands) Yelmer Buurman		6
(Germany) / Mercedes-AMG Team Zakspeed; (Germany) / Team Zakspeed	Mercedes-AMG GT3	21	(Germany) Luca Ludwig		All
(Germany) / Mercedes-AMG Team Zakspeed; (Germany) / Team Zakspeed	Mercedes-AMG GT3	21	(Germany) Luca Stolz	J	All
(Germany) MRS GT-Racing	Nissan GT-R Nismo GT3	22	(Switzerland) Remo Lips	T	All
(Germany) MRS GT-Racing	Nissan GT-R Nismo GT3	22	(Netherlands) Patrick Huisman	T	1–3
(Germany) MRS GT-Racing	Nissan GT-R Nismo GT3	22	(Germany) Marc Gassner		4–7
(Germany) BWT Mücke Motorsport	Audi R8 LMS	24	(Czech Republic) Filip Salaquarda		1–5, 7
(Germany) BWT Mücke Motorsport	Audi R8 LMS	24	(Germany) Markus Winkelhock		1–5, 7
(Germany) BWT Mücke Motorsport	Audi R8 LMS	24	(United Kingdom) Jamie Green		6
(Germany) BWT Mücke Motorsport	Audi R8 LMS	24	(Belgium) Alessio Picariello	J	6
(Germany) BWT Mücke Motorsport	Audi R8 LMS	25	(Germany) Mike David Ortmann	J	All
(Germany) BWT Mücke Motorsport	Audi R8 LMS	25	(Germany) Frank Stippler		1–5, 7
(Germany) BWT Mücke Motorsport	Audi R8 LMS	25	(Czech Republic) Filip Salaquarda		6
(Germany) BWT Mücke Motorsport	Mercedes-AMG GT3	26	(Germany) Sebastian Asch		All
(Germany) BWT Mücke Motorsport	Mercedes-AMG GT3	26	(Germany) Stefan Mücke		1–2, 4, 7
(Germany) BWT Mücke Motorsport	Mercedes-AMG GT3	26	(Austria) Lucas Auer		3, 5
(Germany) BWT Mücke Motorsport	Mercedes-AMG GT3	26	(Italy) Edoardo Mortara		6
(Germany) Schütz Motorsport	Porsche 911 GT3 R	36	(Austria) Klaus Bachler		All
(Germany) Schütz Motorsport	Porsche 911 GT3 R	36	(United Kingdom) Alex MacDowall		All
(Germany) BMW Team Schnitzer	BMW M6 GT3	42	(Austria) Philipp Eng		All
(Germany) BMW Team Schnitzer	BMW M6 GT3	42	(United Kingdom) Ricky Collard	J	1–3
(Germany) BMW Team Schnitzer	BMW M6 GT3	42	(Netherlands) Nick Catsburg		4–7
(Germany) Twin Busch Motorsport	Audi R8 LMS	44	(Germany) Dennis Busch		1–3, 5
(Germany) Twin Busch Motorsport	Audi R8 LMS	44	(Germany) Marc Busch		1–3, 5
(Germany) Mercedes-AMG Team HTP Motorsport	Mercedes-AMG GT3	48	(Netherlands) Indy Dontje	J	All
(Germany) Mercedes-AMG Team HTP Motorsport	Mercedes-AMG GT3	48	(Germany) Marvin Kirchhöfer (Note: Marvin Kirchhöfer only drove in Race 1 at the Nürburgring, while Maximilian Buhk only drove in Race 2. They both shared the car with Indy Dontje.)		All
(Germany) Mercedes-AMG Team HTP Motorsport	Mercedes-AMG GT3	48	(Germany) Maximilian Buhk		5
(Germany) Mercedes-AMG Team HTP Motorsport	Mercedes-AMG GT3	84	(Germany) Patrick Assenheimer	J	All
(Germany) Mercedes-AMG Team HTP Motorsport	Mercedes-AMG GT3	84	(Germany) Maximilian Götz		All
(Germany) YACO Racing	Audi R8 LMS	50	(Switzerland) Rahel Frey		All
(Germany) YACO Racing	Audi R8 LMS	50	(Germany) Philip Geipel		All
(Germany) ADAC NSA / Attempto Racing Team	Lamborghini Huracán GT3	66	(Germany) Jonathan Judek	J	All
(Germany) ADAC NSA / Attempto Racing Team	Lamborghini Huracán GT3	66	(Finland) Emil Lindholm	J	All
(Germany) Callaway Competition	Corvette C7 GT3-R	77	(France) Jules Gounon	J	All
(Germany) Callaway Competition	Corvette C7 GT3-R	77	(Germany) Daniel Keilwitz		1–3, 7
(Germany) Callaway Competition	Corvette C7 GT3-R	77	(Netherlands) Renger van der Zande		4, 6
(Germany) Callaway Competition	Corvette C7 GT3-R	77	(Spain) Albert Costa		5
(Germany) Precote Herberth Motorsport	Porsche 911 GT3 R	99	(Germany) Sven Müller		All
(Germany) Precote Herberth Motorsport	Porsche 911 GT3 R	99	(Germany) Robert Renauer		All

Icon	Legend
J	Junior
T	Trophy

== Race calendar and results ==
The seven-event calendar for the 2017 season was announced on 23 November 2016. It was held along with the Deutsche Tourenwagen Masters at the Lausitzring.

Round		Circuit	Date	Pole position	Race winner
1	R1	(Germany) Motorsport Arena Oschersleben	29 April	(Germany) No. 17 KÜS TEAM75 Bernhard	(Germany) No. 17 KÜS TEAM75 Bernhard
1	R1	(Germany) Motorsport Arena Oschersleben	29 April	(Germany) Michael Ammermüller (France) Mathieu Jaminet	(Germany) Michael Ammermüller (France) Mathieu Jaminet
1	R2	(Germany) Motorsport Arena Oschersleben	30 April	(Germany) No. 42 BMW Team Schnitzer	(Germany) No. 42 BMW Team Schnitzer
1	R2	(Germany) Motorsport Arena Oschersleben	30 April	(United Kingdom) Ricky Collard (Austria) Philipp Eng	(United Kingdom) Ricky Collard (Austria) Philipp Eng
2	R1	(Germany) Lausitzring	20 May	(Germany) No. 21 Mercedes-AMG Team Zakspeed	(Germany) No. 99 Precote Herberth Motorsport
2	R1	(Germany) Lausitzring	20 May	(Germany) Luca Ludwig (Germany) Luca Stolz	(Germany) Sven Müller (Germany) Robert Renauer
2	R2	(Germany) Lausitzring	21 May	(Austria) No. 19 GRT Grasser Racing Team	(Austria) No. 19 GRT Grasser Racing Team
2	R2	(Germany) Lausitzring	21 May	(Italy) Mirko Bortolotti (Argentina) Ezequiel Pérez Companc	(Italy) Mirko Bortolotti (Argentina) Ezequiel Pérez Companc
3	R1	(Austria) Red Bull Ring	10 June	(Germany) No. 77 Callaway Competition	(Germany) No. 77 Callaway Competition
3	R1	(Austria) Red Bull Ring	10 June	(France) Jules Gounon (Germany) Daniel Keilwitz	(France) Jules Gounon (Germany) Daniel Keilwitz
3	R2	(Austria) Red Bull Ring	11 June	(Austria) No. 63 GRT Grasser Racing Team	(Austria) No. 63 GRT Grasser Racing Team
3	R2	(Austria) Red Bull Ring	11 June	(Germany) Christian Engelhart (Switzerland) Rolf Ineichen	(Germany) Christian Engelhart (Switzerland) Rolf Ineichen
4	R1	(Netherlands) Circuit Park Zandvoort	22 July	(Germany) No. 77 Callaway Competition	(Germany) No. 77 Callaway Competition
4	R1	(Netherlands) Circuit Park Zandvoort	22 July	(France) Jules Gounon (Netherlands) Renger van der Zande	(France) Jules Gounon (Netherlands) Renger van der Zande
4	R2	(Netherlands) Circuit Park Zandvoort	23 July	(Austria) No. 19 GRT Grasser Racing Team	(Germany) No. 1 Montaplast by Land-Motorsport
4	R2	(Netherlands) Circuit Park Zandvoort	23 July	(Italy) Mirko Bortolotti (Argentina) Ezequiel Pérez Companc	(Germany) Christopher Mies (United States) Connor De Phillippi
5	R1	(Germany) Nürburgring	5 August	(Germany) No. 21 Mercedes-AMG Team Zakspeed	(Germany) No. 26 BWT Mücke Motorsport
5	R1	(Germany) Nürburgring	5 August	(Germany) Luca Ludwig (Germany) Luca Stolz	(Germany) Sebastian Asch (Austria) Lucas Auer
5	R2	(Germany) Nürburgring	6 August	(Germany) No. 42 BMW Team Schnitzer	(Germany) No. 3 Aust Motorsport
5	R2	(Germany) Nürburgring	6 August	(Netherlands) Nick Catsburg (Austria) Philipp Eng	(South Africa) Kelvin van der Linde (Germany) Markus Pommer
6	R1	(Germany) Sachsenring	16 September	(Germany) No. 1 Montaplast by Land-Motorsport	(Germany) No. 1 Montaplast by Land-Motorsport
6	R1	(Germany) Sachsenring	16 September	(Germany) Christopher Mies (United States) Connor De Phillippi	(Germany) Christopher Mies (United States) Connor De Phillippi
6	R2	(Germany) Sachsenring	17 September	(Germany) No. 20 Mercedes-AMG Team Zakspeed	(Germany) No. 26 BWT Mücke Motorsport
6	R2	(Germany) Sachsenring	17 September	(Netherlands) Yelmer Buurman (Denmark) Nicolai Sylvest	(Germany) Sebastian Asch (Italy) Edoardo Mortara
7	R1	(Germany) Hockenheimring	23 September	(Germany) No. 77 Callaway Competition	(Germany) No. 77 Callaway Competition
7	R1	(Germany) Hockenheimring	23 September	(France) Jules Gounon (Germany) Daniel Keilwitz	(France) Jules Gounon (Germany) Daniel Keilwitz
7	R2	(Germany) Hockenheimring	24 September	(Germany) No. 42 BMW Team Schnitzer	(Austria) No. 63 GRT Grasser Racing Team
7	R2	(Germany) Hockenheimring	24 September	(Netherlands) Nick Catsburg (Austria) Philipp Eng	(Germany) Christian Engelhart (Switzerland) Rolf Ineichen

== Championship standings ==
Scoring system

Championship points were awarded for the first ten positions in each race. Entries were required to complete 75% of the winning car's race distance in order to be classified and earn points. Individual drivers were required to participate for a minimum of 25 minutes in order to earn championship points in any race.

Position	**1st**	**2nd**	**3rd**	**4th**	**5th**	**6th**	**7th**	**8th**	**9th**	**10th**
Points	25	18	15	12	10	8	6	4	2	1

=== Drivers' championships ===
Pos.	Driver	Team	OSC (Germany)		LAU (Germany)		RBR (Austria)		ZAN (Netherlands)		NÜR (Germany)		SAC (Germany)		HOC (Germany)		Points
1	(France) Jules Gounon	(Germany) Callaway Competition	Ret	2	5	4	**1**	3	**1**	6	5	8	8	Ret	**1**	2	174
2	(Germany) Daniel Keilwitz	(Germany) Callaway Competition	Ret	2	5	4	**1**	3							**1**	2	123
3	(Germany) Christopher Mies (United States) Connor De Phillippi	(Germany) Montaplast by Land-Motorsport	3	10	18	2	8	Ret	12	1	17	6	**1**	9	2	8	120
4	(Austria) Philipp Eng	(Germany) BMW Team Schnitzer	10	**1**	17	5	3	5	6	21	9	**2**	3	4	17	**13**	116
5	(South Africa) Kelvin van der Linde	(Germany) Aust Motorsport	4	9	6	7	9	21	2	Ret	6	1	4	6	7	20	107
6	(Germany) Sebastian Asch	(Germany) BWT Mücke Motorsport	6	11	8	12	4	2	4	15	1	13	12	1	19	Ret	104
7	(Germany) Christian Engelhart (Switzerland) Rolf Ineichen	(Austria) GRT Grasser Racing Team	9	12	15	3	18	**1**	7	Ret	11	4			5	1	95
8	(Germany) Michael Ammermüller (France) Mathieu Jaminet	(Germany) KÜS TEAM75 Bernhard	**1**	Ret	7	Ret	7	9	8	5	2	10	10	11	4	7	91
9	(Germany) Christopher Haase (Switzerland) Jeffrey Schmidt	(Germany) Montaplast by Land-Motorsport	5	5	13	11	20	Ret	DNS	2	8	3	11	3	8	3	91
10	(Germany) Markus Pommer	(Germany) Aust Motorsport	4	9	6	7	9	21	2	Ret	6	1			7	20	87
11	(Germany) Luca Ludwig (Germany) Luca Stolz	(Germany) Mercedes-AMG Team Zakspeed	8	8	**2**	17	5	6	5	10	**3**	11	DSQ	DSQ			87
11	(Germany) Luca Ludwig (Germany) Luca Stolz	(Germany) Team Zakspeed													3	9	87
12	(Germany) Sven Müller (Germany) Robert Renauer	(Germany) Precote Herberth Motorsport	7	3	1	Ret	12	25	19	4	Ret	Ret	9	8	12	4	76
13	(Netherlands) Indy Dontje	(Germany) Mercedes-AMG Team HTP Motorsport	15	6	4	10	13	7	3	16	12	7	2	Ret	11	11	66
14	(United Kingdom) Ricky Collard	(Germany) BMW Team Schnitzer	10	**1**	17	5	3	5									61
15	(Germany) Marvin Kirchhöfer	(Germany) Mercedes-AMG Team HTP Motorsport	15	6	4	10	13	7	3	16	12		2	Ret	11	11	60
16	(Germany) Patrick Assenheimer (Germany) Maximilian Götz	(Germany) Mercedes-AMG Team HTP Motorsport	16	20	19	6	6	4	9	Ret	7	Ret	7	2	Ret	Ret	60
17	(Austria) Lucas Auer	(Germany) BWT Mücke Motorsport					4	2			1	13					55
18	(Italy) Mirko Bortolotti (Argentina) Ezequiel Pérez Companc	(Austria) GRT Grasser Racing Team	13	21	3	**1**	21	8	22	**Ret**	10	9			Ret	6	55
19	(Netherlands) Nick Catsburg	(Germany) BMW Team Schnitzer							6	21	9	**2**	3	4	17	**13**	55
20	(Netherlands) Renger van der Zande	(Germany) Callaway Competition							**1**	6			8	Ret			37
21	(Germany) Dennis Marschall (Switzerland) Patric Niederhauser	(Germany) Aust Motorsport	24	Ret	Ret	8	15	11	11	7	4	5	21	10	13	10	34
22	(Austria) Klaus Bachler (United Kingdom) Alex MacDowall	(Germany) Schütz Motorsport	2	14	Ret	13	23	DNS	13	9	25	Ret	6	13	Ret	19	28
23	(Italy) Edoardo Mortara	(Germany) BWT Mücke Motorsport											12	1			25
24	(Germany) Stefan Mücke	(Germany) BWT Mücke Motorsport	6	11	8	12			4	15					19	Ret	24
25	(Italy) Marco Mapelli (Austria) Norbert Siedler	(Austria) HB Racing WDS Bau	14	4	12	15	Ret	14	23	20	14	Ret	15	5	Ret	DNS	22
26	(Germany) Mike David Ortmann	(Germany) BWT Mücke Motorsport	12	Ret	10	14	24	10	14	8	13	12	19	7	14	5	22
27	(South Africa) Sheldon van der Linde	(Germany) Aust Motorsport											4	6			20
28	(Czech Republic) Filip Salaquarda	(Germany) BWT Mücke Motorsport	11	7	Ret	Ret	11	16	Ret	11	Ret	Ret	19	7	6	17	20
29	(Germany) Sven Barth (Germany) Maximilian Hackländer	(Austria) RWT Racing	22	Ret	14	Ret	2	Ret	15	22	21	15	14	Ret	10	14	19
30	(Germany) Florian Spengler (Switzerland) Christopher Zanella	(Austria) HB Racing WDS Bau	18	22	9	16	Ret	12	10	3	15	16	17	19	Ret	22	18
31	(Germany) Frank Stippler	(Germany) BWT Mücke Motorsport	12	Ret	10	14	24	10	14	8	13	12			14	5	16
32	(Spain) Albert Costa	(Germany) Callaway Competition									5	8					14
33	(Germany) Markus Winkelhock	(Germany) BWT Mücke Motorsport	11	7	Ret	Ret	11	16	Ret	11	Ret	Ret			6	17	14
34	(United Kingdom) Jamie Green (Belgium) Alessio Picariello	(Germany) BWT Mücke Motorsport											5	15			10
35	(Germany) Maximilian Buhk	(Germany) Mercedes-AMG Team HTP Motorsport										7					6
36	(Switzerland) Rahel Frey (Germany) Philip Geipel	(Germany) YACO Racing	25	16	11	9	10	13	Ret	19	16	14	Ret	17	15	16	3
37	(Denmark) Nicolai Sylvest	(Germany) Mercedes-AMG Team Zakspeed	21	13	Ret	18	22	15	16	23	20	Ret	DSQ	**DSQ**			2
37	(Denmark) Nicolai Sylvest	(Germany) Team Zakspeed													9	15	2
38	(Switzerland) Nikolaj Rogivue	(Germany) Mercedes-AMG Team Zakspeed	21	13	Ret	18	22	15	16	23	20	Ret					2
38	(Switzerland) Nikolaj Rogivue	(Germany) Team Zakspeed													9	15	2
	(Germany) Christopher Friedrich (Belgium) Adrien De Leener	(Germany) KÜS TEAM75 Bernhard	Ret	19	Ret	19	14	19	17	14	18	20	13	12	16	18	0
	(Switzerland) Ricardo Feller	(Germany) Audi Sport racing academy	17	23	20	20	Ret	17	21	13	22	17	18	16	18	12	0
	(Switzerland) Remo Lips	(Germany) MRS GT-Racing	26	24	21	22	Ret	23	20	12	24	Ret	16	14	Ret	Ret	0
	(Germany) Marc Gassner	(Germany) MRS GT-Racing							20	12	24	Ret	16	14	Ret	Ret	0
	(Germany) Pierre Kaffer	(Germany) Audi Sport racing academy													18	12	0
	(Sweden) Mikaela Åhlin-Kottulinsky	(Germany) Audi Sport racing academy	17	23	20	20	Ret	17	21	13	22	17	18	16			0
	(Germany) Jonathan Judek (Finland) Emil Lindholm	(Germany) ADAC NSA / Attempto Racing Team	20	15	23	21	Ret	24	Ret	18	19	19	20	Ret	20	23	0
	(Germany) Elia Erhart (Austria) Christopher Höher	(Germany) Audi Sport racing academy	19	17	16	23	16	18	18	17	Ret	18	Ret	18	Ret	21	0
	(Austria) Michael Fischer (Czech Republic) Jakub Knoll	(Czech Republic) Šenkýř Motorsport					17	22									0
	(Germany) Dennis Busch (Germany) Marc Busch	(Germany) Twin Busch Motorsport	23	18	22	Ret	19	20			23	DNS					0
	(Netherlands) Patrick Huisman	(Germany) MRS GT-Racing	26	24	21	22	Ret	23									0
	(Netherlands) Yelmer Buurman	(Germany) Mercedes-AMG Team Zakspeed											DSQ	**DSQ**			0
Pos.	Driver	Team	OSC (Germany)		LAU (Germany)		RBR (Austria)		ZAN (Netherlands)		NÜR (Germany)		SAC (Germany)		HOC (Germany)		Points

Key
Colour	Result
Gold	Race winner
Silver	2nd place
Bronze	3rd place
Green	Points finish
Blue	Non-points finish
Blue	Non-classified finish (NC)
Purple	Did not finish (Ret)
Black	Disqualified (DSQ)
Black	Excluded (EX)
White	Did not start (DNS)
White	Race cancelled (C)
White	Withdrew (WD)
Blank	Did not participate

**Bold** – Pole
Italics – Fastest Lap

==== Junior class ====
Pos.	Driver	Team	OSC (Germany)		LAU (Germany)		RBR (Austria)		ZAN (Netherlands)		NÜR (Germany)		SAC (Germany)		HOC (Germany)		Points
1	(France) Jules Gounon	(Germany) Callaway Competition	**Ret**	2	5	4	**1**	3	**1**	6	5	8	8	Ret	**1**	2	228
2	(Switzerland) Jeffrey Schmidt	(Germany) Montaplast by Land-Motorsport	5	5	13	11	20	Ret	DNS	2	8	**3**	13	3	8	**3**	175
3	(Germany) Luca Stolz	(Germany) Mercedes-AMG Team Zakspeed	8	8	**2**	17	5	6	5	10	**3**	11	DSQ	DSQ			168
3	(Germany) Luca Stolz	(Germany) Team Zakspeed													3	9	168
4	(Netherlands) Indy Dontje	(Germany) Mercedes-AMG Team HTP Motorsport	15	6	4	10	13	7	3	16	12	7	2	Ret	11	11	147
5	(Germany) Patrick Assenheimer	(Germany) Mercedes-AMG Team HTP Motorsport	16	20	19	6	6	**4**	9	Ret	7	Ret	7	2	Ret	Ret	112
6	(Germany) Dennis Marschall	(Germany) Aust Motorsport	24	Ret	Ret	8	15	11	11	7	4	5	21	10	13	10	107
7	(Germany) Mike David Ortmann	(Germany) BWT Mücke Motorsport	12	Ret	10	14	24	10	14	8	13	12	19	7	14	5	104
8	(United Kingdom) Ricky Collard	(Germany) BMW Team Schnitzer	10	**1**	17	5	3	5									92
9	(Argentina) Ezequiel Pérez Companc	(Austria) GRT Grasser Racing Team	13	21	3	**1**	21	8	22	**Ret**	10	9			Ret	6	92
10	(Germany) Christopher Friedrich	(Germany) KÜS TEAM75 Bernhard	Ret	19	Ret	19	14	19	17	14	18	20	13	12	16	18	61.5
11	(Denmark) Nicolai Sylvest	(Germany) Mercedes-AMG Team Zakspeed	21	13	Ret	18	22	15	16	23	20	Ret	**DSQ**	**DSQ**			46.5
11	(Denmark) Nicolai Sylvest	(Germany) Team Zakspeed													9	15	46.5
12	(Switzerland) Nikolaj Rogivue	(Germany) Mercedes-AMG Team Zakspeed	21	13	Ret	18	22	15	16	23	20	Ret					46.5
12	(Switzerland) Nikolaj Rogivue	(Germany) Team Zakspeed													9	15	46.5
13	(Switzerland) Ricardo Feller	(Germany) Audi Sport racing academy	17	23	20	20	Ret	17	21	13	22	17	18	16	18	12	46.5
14	(Sweden) Mikaela Åhlin-Kottulinsky	(Germany) Audi Sport racing academy	17	23	20	20	Ret	17	21	13	22	17	18	16			40.5
15	(Austria) Christopher Höher	(Germany) Audi Sport racing academy	19	17	16	23	16	18	18	17	Ret	18	Ret	18	Ret	21	35
16	(South Africa) Sheldon van der Linde	(Germany) Aust Motorsport											4	6			33
17	(Belgium) Alessio Picariello	(Germany) BWT Mücke Motorsport											6	15			21
18	(Germany) Jonathan Judek (Finland) Emil Lindholm	(Germany) ADAC NSA / Attempto Racing Team	20	15	23	21	Ret	24	Ret	18	19	19	21	Ret	20	23	20.25
19	(Austria) Michael Fischer	(Czech Republic) Šenkýř Motorsport					17	22									2
Pos.	Driver	Team	OSC (Germany)		LAU (Germany)		RBR (Austria)		ZAN (Netherlands)		NÜR (Germany)		SAC (Germany)		HOC (Germany)		Points

==== Trophy class ====
Pos.	Driver	Team	Points
1	(Switzerland) Remo Lips	(Germany) MRS GT-Racing	318.5
2	(Germany) Sven Barth	(Austria) RWT Racing	301.5
3	(Switzerland) Rolf Ineichen	(Austria) GRT Grasser Racing Team	261
4	(Netherlands) Patrick Huisman	(Germany) MRS GT-Racing	147

=== Teams' championship ===
Pos.	Team	Manufacturer	OSC (Germany)		LAU (Germany)		RBR (Austria)		ZAN (Netherlands)		NÜR (Germany)		SAC (Germany)		HOC (Germany)		Points
1	(Germany) Callaway Competition	Chevrolet	Ret	2	5	4	**1**	3	**1**	6	5	8	8	Ret	**1**	2	185
2	(Germany) Montaplast by Land-Motorsport	Audi	3	5	13	2	8	Ret	12	1	8	3	**1**	3	2	3	167
3	(Germany) BWT Mücke Motorsport	Audi; Mercedes-Benz	6	7	8	12	4	2	4	8	1	12	5	1	6	5	152
4	(Germany) Aust Motorsport	Audi	4	9	6	7	9	11	2	7	4	1	4	6	7	10	129
5	(Austria) GRT Grasser Racing Team	Lamborghini	9	12	3	**1**	18	**1**	7	**Ret**	10	4			5	1	125
6	(Germany) Mercedes-AMG Team HTP Motorsport	Mercedes-Benz	15	6	4	6	6	4	3	16	7	7	2	2	11	11	123
7	(Germany) BMW Team Schnitzer	BMW	10	**1**	17	5	3	5	6	21	9	**2**	3	4	17	**13**	121
8	(Germany) KÜS TEAM75 Bernhard	Porsche	**1**	Ret	7	19	7	9	8	5	2	10	10	11	4	7	109
9	(Germany) Precote Herberth Motorsport	Porsche	7	3	1	Ret	12	25	19	4	Ret	Ret	9	8	12	4	86
10	(Germany) Mercedes-AMG Team Zakspeed	Mercedes-Benz	8	8	**2**	17	5	6	5	10	**3**	11	DSQ	**DSQ**			77
11	(Austria) HB Racing WDS Bau	Lamborghini	14	4	9	15	Ret	12	10	3	14	16	15	5	Ret	22	49
12	(Germany) Schütz Motorsport	Porsche	2	14	Ret	13	23	DNS	13	9	25	Ret	6	13	Ret	19	34
13	(Austria) RWT Racing	Chevrolet	22	Ret	14	Ret	2	Ret	15	22	21	15	14	Ret	10	14	23
14	(Germany) Team Zakspeed	Mercedes-Benz													3	9	21
15	(Germany) YACO Racing	Audi	25	16	11	9	10	13	Ret	19	16	14	Ret	17	15	16	10
16	(Germany) MRS GT-Racing	Nissan	26	24	21	22	Ret	23	20	12	24	Ret	16	14	Ret	Ret	2
17	(Germany) Audi Sport racing academy	Audi	17	17	16	20	16	17	18	13	22	17	18	16	18	12	1
	(Germany) ADAC NSA / Attempto Racing Team	Lamborghini	20	15	23	21	Ret	24	Ret	18	19	19	20	Ret	20	23	0
	(Czech Republic) Šenkýř Motorsport	BMW					17	22									0
	(Germany) Twin Busch Motorsport	Audi	23	18	22	Ret	19	20			23	DNS					0
Pos.	Team	Manufacturer	OSC (Germany)		LAU (Germany)		RBR (Austria)		ZAN (Netherlands)		NÜR (Germany)		SAC (Germany)		HOC (Germany)		Points
