= Franz Wöss Racing =

Austrian motor racing team

(Austria) Franz Wöss Racing
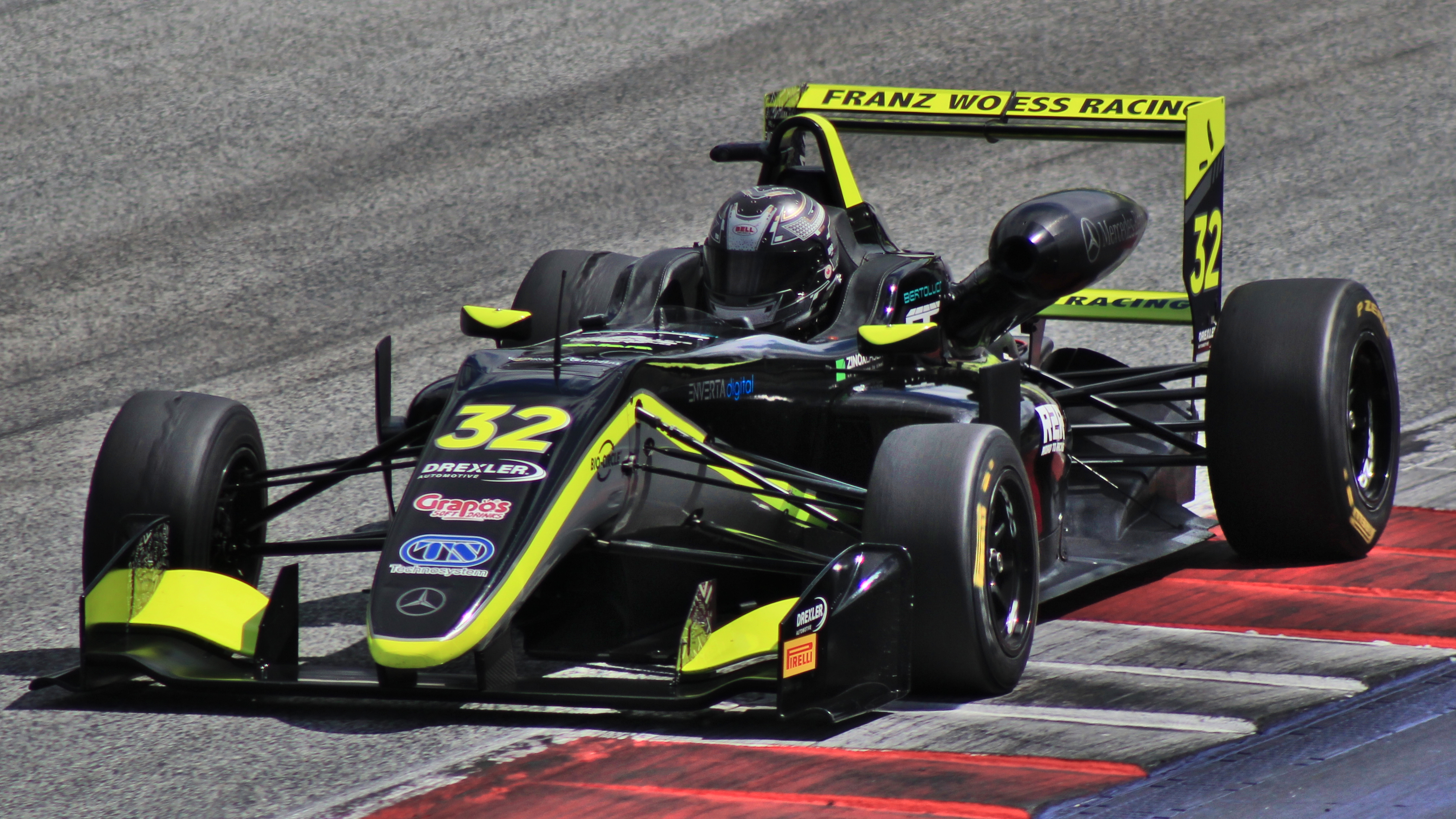
- Founded: 1990
- Team principal(s): Franz Wöss
- Current series: Drexler-Automotive Formula 3 Cup; F2000 Italian Formula Trophy
- Former series: German Formula 3
- Drivers' Championships: Austria Formula 3 Cup: 1997: Petr Krizan; 1998: André Fibier; 1999: André Fibier; 2001: Diego Romanini; 2005: Florian Schnitzenbaumer; 2007: Stefan Neuburger; 2009: Francesco Lopez; 2013: Christopher Höher

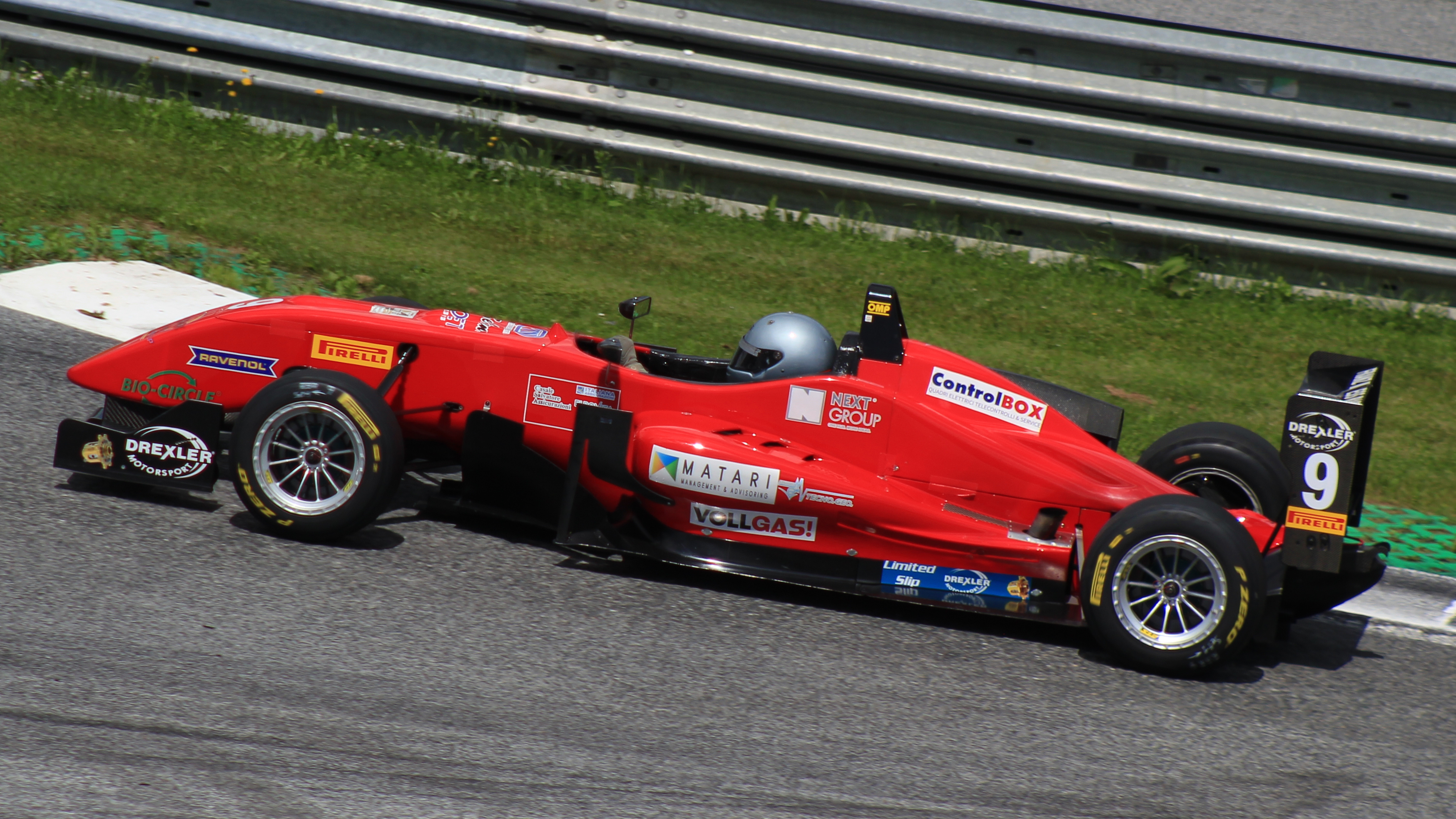
Luca Iannaccone in a Dallara F308 prepared by Franz Wöss Racing in 2022

Franz Wöss Racing is an Austrian motor racing team. It was founded in the early 1990s by Franz Wöss. Currently Franz Wöss Racing competes in the Remus F3 Cup. The team did also participate in the now folded German Formula 3 Championship occasionally.

Franz Wöss Racing didn't aim to compete for championships in German Formula 3, but rather entered and prepared any car from well-funded or so-called 'gentleman drivers'. From 2006 to 2013, with the exceptions of Hamad Al Fardan and their 2011 entries, they competed only in the Trophy Class which was restricted to older Formula 3 cars.

The team won their first drivers' championship in the 1997 Austria Formula 3 Cup season with Czech driver Petr Krizan. However, the team has won the 1994 Austria Formula 3 Trophy before.

Team founder and owner Franz Wöss is also the organizer of the Remus F3 Cup and the FIA CEZ Formula 3.

== Current series results ==
=== Austria Formula 3 Cup/Remus F3 Cup ===
Austria Formula 3 Cup
Year	Car	Drivers	Races	Wins	Poles	F/Laps	Points	D.C.
1994	Ralt	(Austria) Ewald Kapferer [T]	?	?	?	?	?	1st [T]
1995	?	(Austria) Georg Holzer [T]	?	?	?	?	?	1st [T]
1996	Dallara 393-Opel	(Poland) Jaroslaw Wierczuk	13	0	1	0	100	3rd
1996	Dallara 394-Opel	(Germany) Florian Schnitzenbaumer	13	0	0	1	74	4th
1996	Dallara 393-Opel; Dallara 393-FIAT	(Austria) Franz Wöss	11	0	0	0	62	6th
1996	Dallara 393-Opel; Dallara 393-FIAT	(Germany) Tobias Schlesinger	2	0	0	0	0	NC
1996	Ralt RT34-Volkswagen	(Austria) Kurt Fischer [T]	5	0	2	0	55	4th [T]
1996	Ralt RT34-Volkswagen	(Austria) Georg Holzer [T]	4	0	4	4	80	2nd [T]
1996	Ralt RT35-Volkswagen	(Austria) Georg Holzer [T]	4	0	4	4	80	2nd [T]
1996	Ralt RT35-Volkswagen	(Austria) Christoph Fuchs [T]	2	0	0	2	30	7th [T]
1997	Dallara 394-Opel	(Czech Republic) Petr Křižan	10	5	3	5	154	1st
1997	Dallara 394-Opel	(Germany) Florian Schnitzenbaumer	11	1	0	1	125	2nd
1997	Dallara 393-Opel	(Austria) Franz Wöss	10	0	0	1	90	4th
1997	Dallara 393-Opel	(Austria) Wolfgang Krebitz	2	0	0	0	7	15th
1997	Dallara 393-Opel	(Austria) Kurt Fischer	2	0	0	0	4	19th
1997	Dallara 393-Opel	(Germany) André Fibier	1	1	1	1	20	11th
1997	Dallara 394-FIAT	(Sweden) Nicklas Karlsson	1	0	0	0	0	NC
1997	Ralt RT34-Volkswagen; Dallara 393-Opel; Ralt RT35-Volkswagen	(Austria) Peter Schmid	5	0	0	0	7	15th
1997	Ralt RT34-Volkswagen	(Austria) Georg Holzer [T]	10	10	0	8	100	1st [T]
1998	Dallara F396-Opel	(Czech Republic) Jaromir Zdrazil	14	0	0	0	32	12th
1998	Dallara F396-Opel	(Austria) Franz Wöss	4	0	0	0	34	11th
1998	Dallara 395-Opel	(Germany) André Fibier	15	5	6	4	238	1st
1998	Dallara 394-Opel	(Norway) Ole Martin Lindum	2	0	0	0	18	16th
1998	Dallara 393-Opel	(Croatia) Hrvoje Baric [T]	8	0	0	0	47	3rd [T]
1999	Dallara F397-Opel	(Germany) André Fibier	15	6	6	4	249	1st
1999	Dallara F397-Opel	(Czech Republic) Jaromir Zdrazil	2	0	0	0	61	8th†
1999	Dallara F396-Opel	(Austria) Franz Wöss	15	0	0	0	106	5th
2000	Dallara F397-Opel	(Italy) Diego Romanini	11	0	0	1	130	3rd
2000	Dallara F397-Opel	(Germany) André Fibier	1	1	0	1	20	15th
2000	Dallara F397-Opel	(Germany) Heinz Baltensperger	8	0	0	0	20	15th
2000	Dallara F397-Opel	(Germany) Ingo Alton	4	0	0	0	24	13th
2000	Dallara F397-Opel	(Austria) Franz Wöss	14	0	2	2	106	4th
2000	Dallara F398-Opel	(Austria) Franz Wöss	14	0	2	2	106	4th
2000	Dallara F398-Opel	(Austria) Clemens Stadler	5	0	1	1	85	6th
2000	Dallara F396-Opel	(Germany) Christian Zeller	2	0	0	0	9	27th
2000	Dallara F396-Opel	(Germany) Heinz Baltensperger	8	0	0	0	20	15th
2000	Ralt RT37-Mugen-Honda	(Switzerland) Josef Sommerhalder	4	0	0	0	9	27th
2001	Dallara F399-Opel	(Italy) Diego Romanini	6	2	0	0	171	1st†
2001	Dallara F399-Opel	(Austria) Clemens Stadler	6	1	1	1	32	10th
2001	Dallara F399-Opel	(Austria) Franz Wöss	8	0	0	1	95	4th
2001	Dallara F398-Opel	(Germany) Christian Zeller	3	0	0	0	20	14th
2001	Dallara F300-Opel	(Austria) Georg Holzer	2	0	0	0	6	17th
2001	Dallara F396-Opel	(Germany) Heinz Baltensperger [T]	4	0	0	0	10	4th [T]
2002	Dallara F399-Opel	(Austria) Denis Watt	5	0	0	0	48	8th
2002	Dallara F399-Opel	(Austria) Franz Wöss	8	2	1	1	121	2nd
2002	Dallara F399-Opel	(Italy) Denis Lupo	2	0	0	0	18	17th
2002	Dallara F300-Opel	(Germany) Christian Zeller	8	0	0	0	52	6th
2002	Dallara F398-Opel	(France) Remy Striebig	4	0	0	0	35	13th
2002	Dallara F396-Opel	(Germany) Heinz Baltensperger [T]	4	1	0	0	45	4th† [T]
2003	Dallara F302-Opel	(Belgium) Olivier Muytjens	4	0	0	0	23	14th
2003	Dallara F302-Opel; Dallara F399-Opel	(Austria) Franz Wöss	6	0	0	0	56	8th†
2003	Dallara F399-Opel	(Germany) Sven Barth	10	4	0	0	167	3rd
2003	Dallara F399-Opel	(Germany) André Fibier	2	0	0	0	20	15th
2003	Dallara F399-Opel	(Germany) Marcel Lasée	2	0	0	0	0	NC
2003	Dallara F399-Opel	(Germany) David Hemkemeyer	4	0	0	0	28	13th
2004	Dallara F399-Opel; Dallara F302-Opel	(Austria) Franz Wöss	3	0	0	0	48	7th
2004	Dallara F399-Opel	(Germany) Ina Fabry	2	0	0	0	12	15th
2005	Dallara F301-Opel; Dallara F302-Opel	(Germany) Christopher Kuntz	8	2	0	0	105	2nd
2005	Dallara F302-Opel	(Austria) Franz Wöss	2	2	0	2	40	7th
2005	Dallara F399-Opel	(Germany) Florian Schnitzenbaumer	9	1	0	0	110	1st
2005	Dallara F301-Opel	(Germany) Thilo Matheis	6	0	0	0	50	6th
2006	Dallara F302-Opel	(Germany) Christopher Kuntz	2	1	0	0	35	10th
2006	Dallara F302-Opel	(Austria) Martin Konrad	12	0	0	0	157	2nd
2006	Dallara F302-Opel	(Austria) Franz Wöss	2	0	0	0	20	12th
2006	Dallara F302-Opel	(Austria) Denis Watt	9	0	0	0	84	3rd
2007	Dallara F303-Opel	(Germany) Francesco Lopez	10	1	1	1	119	2nd
2007	Dallara F302-Opel	(Austria) Stefan Neuburger	8	4	3	2	137	1st
2007	Dallara F302-Opel	(Germany) Florian Schnitzenbaumer	2	0	0	0	15	11th
2008	Dallara F302-Opel	(Austria) Stefan Neuburger	2	0	0	0	6	16th
2008	Dallara F302-Opel	(Germany) Francesco Lopez	4	0	0	0	30	5th
2008	Dallara F305-Mercedes	(Bahrain) Hamad Al Fardan	4	2	3	3	25	7th
2008	Dallara F305-Mercedes	(Austria) Franz Wöss	2	0	0	0	10	13th
2009	Dallara F302-Opel	(Germany) Florian Schnitzenbaumer	2	0	0	0	8	11th
2009	Dallara F302-Opel	(Germany) Francesco Lopez	10	10	10	10	100	1st
2010	Dallara F302-OPC Challenge	(Germany) Florian Schnitzenbaumer	10	2	2	2	139	2nd
2010	Dallara F302-OPC Challenge	(Austria) Franz Wöss	2	0	0	0	10	14th
2010	Dallara F302-Opel	(Germany) Francesco Lopez	4	0	0	0	46	8th
2010	Dallara F303-Opel	(Austria) Stefan Neuburger	2	0	0	0	3	16th
2011	Dallara F302-OPC Challenge	(Germany) Florian Schnitzenbaumer	14	0	0	0	152	2nd
2011	Dallara F305-OPC Challenge	(Austria) Franz Wöss	4	0	0	0	36	9th
2011	Dallara F305-OPC Challenge	(Germany) Francesco Lopez	2	0	0	0	12	18th
2011	Dallara F305-OPC Challenge	(Austria) Stefan Neuburger	2	0	0	0	19	17th
2011	Dallara F305-OPC Challenge	(Austria) Manfred Lang	2	0	0	0	0	26th
2011	Dallara F303-Opel	(Germany) Andreas Holzer	12	0	0	0	63	5th
2011	Dallara F306-Opel	(Switzerland) Dominik Kocher	12	0	0	0	57	6th
2012	Dallara F305-OPC Challenge	(Austria) Stefan Neuburger	2	0	0	0	16	16th
2012	Dallara F305-OPC Challenge	(Germany) Maximilian Hackl	4	0	0	0	34	11th
2012	Dallara F305-OPC Challenge	(Germany) Fabian Hamprecht	4	0	0	0	60	5th
2012	Dallara F306-Mercedes	(Finland) Jani Tammi	14	0	0	0	164	3rd
2012	Dallara F303-OPC Challenge	(Germany) Thomas Warken	9	0	0	0	58	8th
2012	Dallara F302-OPC Challenge	(Austria) Franz Wöss	6	0	0	0	34	11th
2012	Dallara F302-OPC Challenge	(Germany) Florian Schnitzenbaumer	2	0	0	0	10	18th
Remus F3 Cup
2013	Dallara F302-Opel; Dallara F308-OPC Challenge	(Austria) Franz Wöss	6	0	0	0	75	7th
2013	Dallara F305-Opel	(Austria) Christopher Höher	12	12	12	11	300	1st
2013	Dallara F305-Opel	(Germany) Maximilian Hackl	4	0	0	0	51	9th
2013	Dallara F302-Opel	(Germany) Florian Schnitzenbaumer [T]	2	0	0	0	43	6th [T]
2014	Dallara F305-Opel	(Germany) Angelique Germann	12	0	0	0	20	16th
2014	Dallara F308-Opel	(Austria) Stefan Neuburger	2	0	0	0	30	14th
2014	Dallara F308-Opel	(Switzerland) Nikolaj Rogivue	4	0	0	0	30	14th
2014	Dallara F308-Opel	(Austria) Franz Wöss	8	0	0	0	70	6th
2014	Dallara F306-Opel	(Finland) Jani Tammi	2	0	0	0	0	21st
2014	Dallara F308-Mercedes	(Austria) Christopher Höher	2	1	1	1	43	9th
2014	Dallara F302-Opel	(Germany) Florian Schnitzenbaumer [T]	12	9	0	0	243	1st [T]
2014	Dallara F302-Opel	(Italy) Luca Iannaccone [T]	2	0	0	0	0	NC
2015	Dallara F308-Opel	(Austria) Stefan Neuburger	2	0	0	0	20	18th
2015	Dallara F308-Opel	(Switzerland) Kurt Böhlen	8	0	0	0	105	6th
2015	Dallara F308-Opel; Dallara F312-Oreca	(Austria) Christopher Höher	10	4	3	3	113	5th
2015	Dallara F305-Opel	(Germany) Dr. Ulrich Drechsler	12	0	0	0	36	12th
2015	Dallara F303-Opel	(Italy) Luca Iannaccone [T]	14	1	0	0	123.5	2nd [T]
2016	Dallara F308-Opel	(Germany) Angelique Germann	14	1	0	0	124	5th
2016	Dallara F308-Opel	(Switzerland) Kurt Böhlen	14	1	5	1	196	2nd
2016	Dallara F308-Opel	(Austria) Franz Wöss	6	0	0	0	42	11th
2016	Dallara F308-Opel	(Austria) Stefan Neuburger	2	0	0	0	14	15th
2016	Dallara F305-Opel	(Germany) Dr. Ulrich Drechsler	10	0	0	0	41	12th
2016	Dallara F305-Opel	(Italy) Luca Iannaccone [T]	14	0	0	0	118.5	2nd [T]
2017	Dallara F308-Opel	(Germany) Angelique Germann	8	1	0	0	124	5th
2017	Dallara F308-Opel	(Switzerland) Kurt Böhlen	14	0	0	1	198	3rd
2017	Dallara F308-Opel	(Germany) Florian Schnitzenbaumer	2	0	0	0	0	NC
2017	Dallara F308-Opel	(Italy) Luca Iannaccone	8	0	0	0	24	11th†
2017	Dallara F308-Opel	(Switzerland) Thomas Aregger	2	0	0	0	24	11th
2017	Dallara F305-Opel	(Germany) Dr. Ulrich Drechsler [T]	12	1	0	0	127.5	2nd [T]
2017	Dallara F305-Opel	(Germany) Philipp Regensperger	14	2	2	2	213	2nd
2018	Dallara F308-Opel	(Germany) Angelique Germann	2	0	0	0	10	19th
2018	Dallara F308-Opel	(Germany) Dr. Ulrich Drechsler	4	0	0	0	8	20th
2018	Dallara F305-Volkswagen	(Switzerland) Thomas Aregger	2	0	0	0	0	26th
2018	Dallara F305-Volkswagen	(Italy) Luca Iannaccone	10	0	0	0	8	4th [T]

† – Shared results with other teams

== Former series results ==
=== German Formula 3 ===
German Formula Three Championship
Year	Car	Drivers	Races	Wins	Poles	F/Laps	Points	D.C.	T.C.
1991	Ralt RT34-Volkswagen	(Austria) Ewald Kapferer	4	0	0	0	1	27th	N/A
1991	Ralt RT34-Volkswagen	(Austria) Franz Wöss	2	0	0	0	0	40th	N/A
1992	Ralt RT34-Volkswagen	(Austria) Kurt Fischer	5	0	0	0	0	38th	N/A
1992	Ralt RT35-Volkswagen	(Austria) Franz Wöss	12	0	0	0	0	35th	N/A
1993	Ralt RT36-Volkswagen	(Germany) André Fibier	19	0	0	0	37	10th	N/A
1993	Ralt RT35-Volkswagen	(Austria) Georg Holzer	6	0	0	0	0	34th	N/A
1993	Ralt RT35-Volkswagen	(Austria) Franz Wöss	10	0	0	0	0	35th	N/A
1994	Dallara 393-Volkswagen	(Austria) Patrick Vallant	3	0	0	0	0	NC	N/A
1994	Dallara 393-Volkswagen	(Austria) Martin Albrecht	2	0	0	0	0	NC	N/A
1994	Dallara 393-Volkswagen	(Austria) Franz Wöss	13	0	0	0	0	NC	N/A
1994	Ralt RT36/956-Volkswagen	(Austria) Franz Wöss	13	0	0	0	0	NC	N/A
1994	Ralt RT36/956-Volkswagen	(Austria) Josef Neuhauser	2	0	0	0	0	NC	N/A
1994	Ralt RT36/956-Volkswagen	(Austria) Georg Holzer	2	0	0	0	0	NC	N/A
German Formula 3 Class B
1996	Dallara 394-FIAT; Dallara 393-Opel	(Poland) Jarosław Wierczuk	13	0	0	0	13	8th†	N/A
1996	Dallara 393-Opel	(Germany) Tobias Schlesinger	2	0	0	0	27	5th†	N/A
1996	Dallara 396-Alfa Romeo	(Austria) Georg Holzer	2	0	0	0	4	10th	N/A
1996	Dallara 396-Alfa Romeo	(Austria) Christoph Fuchs	2	0	0	0	2	12th	N/A
1996	Dallara 396-Alfa Romeo	(Germany) Florian Schnitzenbaumer	2	0	0	0	7	9th	N/A
German Formula Three Championship
2001	Dallara F399-Opel	(Austria) Clemens Stadler	2	0	0	0	0	36th†	N/A
2003	Dallara F302-Opel	(Belgium) Olivier Muytjens	4	0	0	0	6	17th	N/A
2003	Dallara F302-Opel	(Austria) Franz Wöss	2	0	0	0	1	26th†	N/A
2003	Dallara F399-Opel	(Germany) Sven Barth	16	1	0	0	191	2nd	N/A
2003	Dallara F399-Opel	(Germany) André Fibier	2	0	0	0	5	18th	N/A
2003	Dallara F399-Opel	(Germany) Marcel Lasée	2	0	0	0	8	16th	N/A
2003	Dallara F399-Opel	(Germany) Ina Fabry	6	0	0	0	3	22nd	N/A
2003	Dallara F399-Opel	(Germany) David Hemkemeyer	4	0	0	0	0	33rd	N/A
2004	Dallara F302-Opel	(Germany) Marcus Steinel	16	0	0	0	13	13th	N/A
2004	Dallara F399-Opel	(Austria) Franz Wöss	4	0	0	0	0	32nd	N/A
2004	Dallara F399-Opel	(Germany) Ina Fabry	2	0	0	0	0	31st	N/A
2004	Dallara F399-Opel	(Germany) Florian Schnitzenbaumer	1	0	0	0	0	28th	N/A
2004	Dallara F399-Opel	(Germany) André Fibier	1	0	0	0	0	29th	N/A
2005	Dallara F302-Opel	(Germany) Sven Barth	2	0	0	0	0	21st	N/A
2005	Dallara F302-Opel	(Austria) Franz Wöss	2	0	0	0	0	29th	N/A
2005	Dallara F302-Opel	(Germany) Christopher Kuntz	15	0	0	0	0	24th	N/A
2005	Dallara F301-Opel	(Germany) Christopher Kuntz	15	0	0	0	0	24th	N/A
2005	Dallara F301-Opel	(Italy) Diego Romanini [T]	2	0	0	0	0	35th	N/A
2005	Dallara F399-Opel	(Germany) Florian Schnitzenbaumer [T]	12	0	0	0	0	27th	N/A
German Formula 3 Trophy
2006	Dallara F302-Opel	(Austria) Martin Konrad	17	0	0	0	28	7st	N/A
2006	Dallara F302-Opel	(Austria) Denis G. Watt	10	0	0	0	3	23rd	N/A
2006	Dallara F301-Opel	(Germany) Christopher Kuntz	2	0	0	0	1	24th	N/A
2006	Dallara F303-Opel	(Finland) Marko Nevalainen	2	0	0	0	10	15th	N/A
2007	Dallara F303-Opel	(Austria) Michael Aberer	2	0	0	0	2	13th	N/A
2007	Dallara F303-Opel	(Germany) Francesco Lopez	2	0	0	0	8	10th	N/A
2007	Dallara F302-Opel	(Austria) Stefan Neuburger	2	0	0	0	0	NC	N/A
German Formula Three Championship
2008	Dallara F305-Mercedes	(Bahrain) Hamad Al Fardan	11	0	0	0	13	12th	N/A
2008	Dallara F303-Opel	(Austria) Bernd Herndlhofer [T]	11	3	0	0	116	2nd [T]	N/A
2008	Dallara F302-Opel	(Germany) Francesco Lopez [T]	6	0	0	0	27	8th [T]	N/A
German Formula 3 Trophy
2009	Dallara F302-Opel	(Germany) Stefan Neuburger	2	0	0	0	7	10th	N/A
2009	Dallara F302-Opel	(Germany) Francesco Lopez	14	0	0	0	89	3rd	N/A
German Formula Three Championship
2011	Dallara F306-OPC Challenge	(Switzerland) Dominik Kocher	4	0	0	0	0	NC	N/A
2011	Dallara F305-OPC Challenge	(Austria) Stefan Neuburger	2	0	0	0	0	NC	N/A
2011	Dallara F305-OPC Challenge	(Germany) Francesco Lopez	2	0	0	0	0	NC	N/A
German Formula 3 Trophy
2012	Dallara F305-OPC Challenge	(Germany) Maximilian Hackl	3	0	0	0	44	6th	N/A
2012	Dallara F302-Opel	(France) Sylvain Warnecke	3	0	0	0	14	7th	N/A
2013	Dallara F302-OPC Challenge	(Italy) Luca Iannaccone	3	0	0	0	95	8th†	9th
2013	Dallara F305-OPC Challenge	(Germany) Maximilian Hackl	20	0	0	0	175	4th	9th
2013	Dallara F305-OPC Challenge	(Austria) Christopher Höher	20	0	0	0	44	10th	9th
2013	Dallara F308-OPC Challenge	(Austria) Stefan Neuburger	20	0	0	0	31	11th	9th
German Formula Three Championship
2014	Dallara F305-OPC Challenge	(Italy) Luca Iannaccone	14	0	0	0	0	NC‡	NC
2014	Dallara F308-OPC Challenge	(Switzerland) Nikolaj Rogivue	3	0	0	0	0	NC‡	NC

† – Shared results with other teams ‡ – Guest driver – ineligible for points.
