= Jo Zeller Racing =

Swiss car racing team

(Switzerland) Jo Zeller Racing
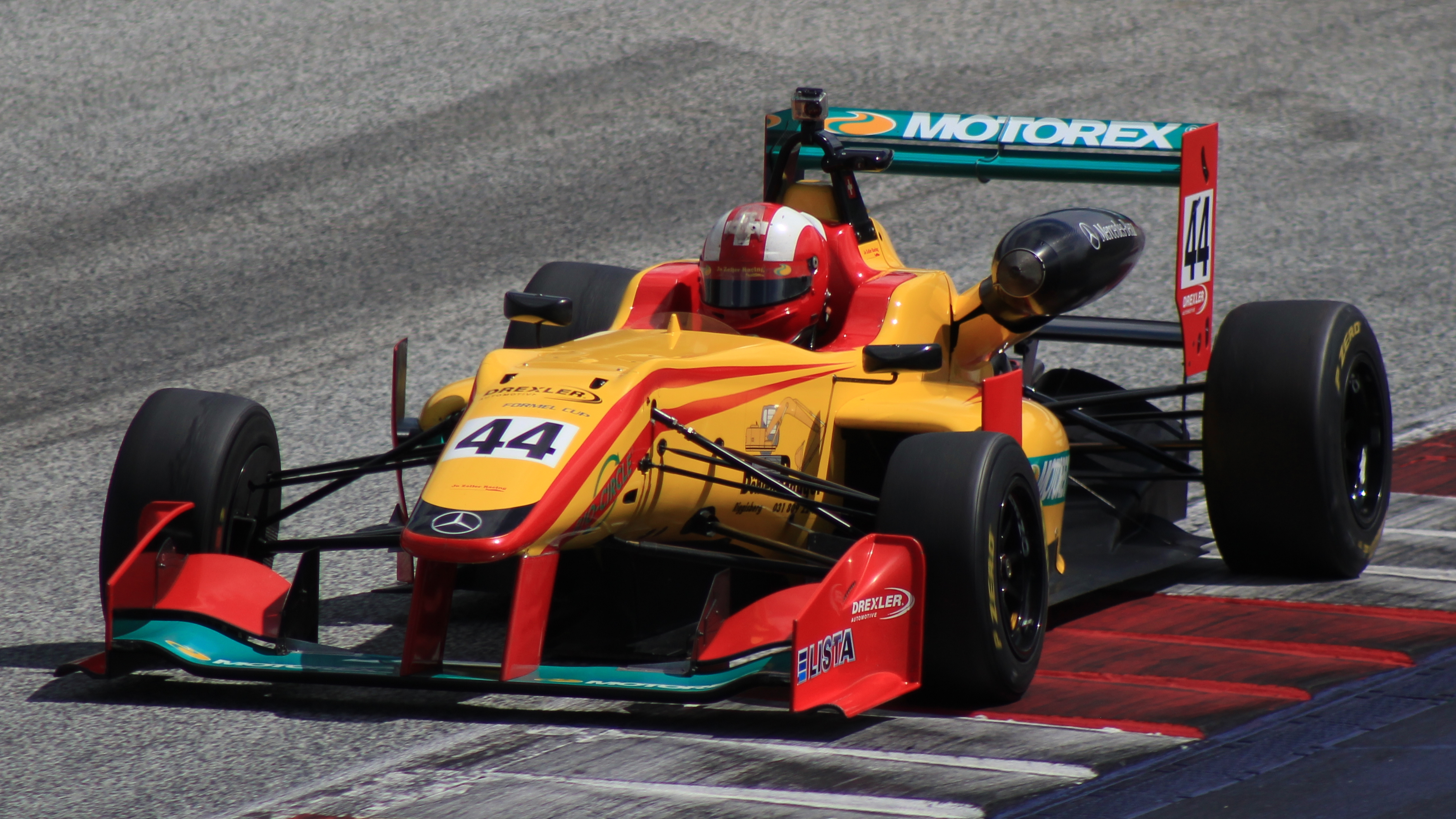
- Founded: 1990
- Team principal(s): Jo Zeller
- Current series: Drexler-Automotive Formula 3 Cup; F2000 Italian Formula Trophy; BOSS GP
- Former series: German Formula 3 Formula 3 Euro Series; Formula LO; FIA Formula 3 European Championship
- Current drivers: (Switzerland) Sandro Zeller
- Drivers' Championships: Swiss Formula 3: 1990-92: Jo Zeller; 1995: Jo Zeller; 1998-2003: Jo Zeller; 2004: Patrick Dütsch; 2006-08: Jo Zeller; 2014: Thomas Amweg; 2016-18: Sandro Zeller; German Formula 3: 2005: Peter Elkmann; 2008: Frédéric Vervisch; Formula Lista Junior: 2010: Michael Lamotte; Austria Formula 3 Cup: 2011: Sandro Zeller; 2016-18: Sandro Zeller
- Website: https://jozellerracing.com/

Jo Zeller Racing is a Swiss motor racing team. It was founded in the early 1990s by Jo Zeller. Currently Jo Zeller Racing competes in the Remus F3 Cup. Jo Zeller always focussed on regional and continental championships in Germany and Europe.

After winning multiple national championships with team founder Jo Zeller, the team had its first major success in the 2005 German Formula 3 Championship with Peter Elkmann.

== Current series results ==
=== Austria Formula 3 Cup/Remus F3 Cup ===
Austria Formula 3 Cup
Year	Car	Drivers	Races	Wins	Poles	F/Laps	Points	D.C.
2003	Dallara F396-Opel	(Switzerland) Urs Rüttimann	2	0	0	0	7	22nd
2005	Dallara F301-Opel	(Switzerland) Urs Rüttimann	2	1	0	0	35	9th
2005	Dallara F399-Opel	(Switzerland) Daniel Roider	2	0	0	0	18	13th
2006	Dallara F399-Opel	(Switzerland) Daniel Roider	2	0	0	0	19	13th
2007	Dallara F393-FIAT	(Switzerland) Daniel Savare	2	0	0	0	8	13th
2009	Dallara F300-Opel	(Switzerland) Marcel Tobler	4	0	0	0	26	3rd
2009	Dallara F399-Opel	(Switzerland) Daniel Roider	4	0	0	0	20	6th
2009	Dallara F394-FIAT	(Switzerland) Roland Müller	2	0	0	0	4	13th
2010	Dallara F306-Mercedes	(Switzerland) Sandro Zeller	8	3	6	5	115	3rd
2010	Dallara F300-Opel	(Switzerland) Marcel Tobler	10	0	0	0	104	5th
2010	Dallara F399-Opel	(Switzerland) Daniel Roider	12	0	0	0	104	4th
2011	Dallara F306-Mercedes	(Switzerland) Sandro Zeller	12	9	?	?	225	1st
2011	Dallara F399-Opel	(Switzerland) Daniel Roider	4	0	0	0	9	21st
2012	Dallara F306-Mercedes	(Switzerland) Sandro Zeller	10	7	7	7	185	2nd
2012	Dallara F399-Opel	(Switzerland) Daniel Roider	6	0	0	0	15	17th
2012	Dallara F399-Opel	(Germany) Gerd Lünsmann	2	0	0	0	1	22nd
Remus F3 Cup
2013	Dallara F308-Mercedes	(Switzerland) Marcel Tobler	10	0	0	0	122	3rd
2013	Dallara F305-Mercedes	(Switzerland) Thomas Amweg	10	2	2	2	182	2nd
2013	Dallara F399-Opel	(Switzerland) Daniel Roider	4	0	0	0	30	12th
2014	Dallara F308-Mercedes	(Switzerland) Marcel Tobler	10	0	1	2	156	2nd
2014	Dallara F305-Mercedes	(Switzerland) Thomas Amweg	12	10	10	7	283	1st
2015	Dallara F308-Mercedes	(Switzerland) Marcel Tobler	10	0	0	0	40	11th
2015	Dallara F305-Mercedes	(Switzerland) Thomas Amweg	10	0	0	0	135	3rd
2015	Dallara F306-Mercedes	(Switzerland) Sandro Zeller	12	1	0	1	71	7th
2016	Dallara F306-Opel	(Switzerland) Urs Rüttimann	4	0	0	0	18	14th
2016	Dallara F308-Mercedes	(Switzerland) Marcel Tobler	12	0	0	0	135	4th
2016	Dallara F308-Mercedes	(Switzerland) Sandro Zeller	12	9	5	5	265	1st
2017	Dallara F306-Mercedes	(Switzerland) Urs Rüttimann	4	0	0	0	20	15th
2017	Dallara F308-Mercedes	(Switzerland) Marcel Tobler	12	0	0	0	115	4th
2017	Dallara F308-Mercedes	(Switzerland) Sandro Zeller	2	2	1	0	300	1st
2017	Dallara F306-Mercedes	(Switzerland) Sandro Zeller	12	7	7	7	300	1st
2018	Dallara F306-Mercedes	(Switzerland) Sandro Zeller	14	13	7	9	326	1st
2018	Dallara F306-Mercedes	(Switzerland) Urs Rüttimann	6	0	0	0	23	12th
2018	Dallara F308-Mercedes	(Switzerland) Marcel Tobler	14	0	0	0	151	3rd
2018	Dallara F305-Opel	(Germany) Dr. Ralph Pütz	4	0	0	0	18	15th

== Former series results ==
=== German Formula 3 ===
German Formula Three Championship
Year	Car	Drivers	Races	Wins	Poles	F/Laps	Points	D.C.	T.C.
1994	Dallara F393-FIAT	(Switzerland) Jo Zeller	6	0	0	0	0	28th	N/A
1994	Ralt RT37-Mugen-Honda	(Switzerland) Urs Rüttimann	2	0	0	0	0	28th	N/A
2000	Dallara F399-Opel	(Switzerland) Mirco Schrepfer	4	0	0	0	0	33rd	N/A
2003	Dallara F301-Opel	(Switzerland) Jo Zeller	2	0	1	0	19	13th	N/A
2003	Dallara F301-Opel	(Switzerland) Tobias Blättler	2	0	0	0	5	19th†	N/A
2003	Dallara F396-Opel	(Switzerland) Urs Rüttimann	2	0	0	0	0	37th	N/A
2004	Dallara F302-Opel	(Germany) Timo Lienemann	18	2	3	0	208	2nd	N/A
2005	Dallara F302-Opel	(Germany) Peter Elkmann	18	6	8	9	150	1st	N/A
2005	Dallara F301-Opel	(Switzerland) Urs Rüttimann	4	0	0	0	0	26th	N/A
2005	Dallara F399-Opel	(Switzerland) Daniel Roider	2	0	0	0	0	42nd	N/A
2006	Dallara F301-Opel	(Switzerland) Urs Rüttimann [T]	6	0	0	0	13	13th [T]	N/A
2008	Dallara F307-Mercedes	(Belgium) Frédéric Vervisch	6	5	4	5	120	1st†	N/A
2008	Dallara F307-Mercedes	(Germany) Kevin Mirocha	2	0	0	0	56	6th†	N/A
2009	Dallara F306-Mercedes	(Switzerland) Rahel Frey	10	1	1	1	45	7th	N/A
2009	Dallara F306-Mercedes	(Germany) Tim Sandtler	2	0	0	0	8	15th	N/A
2009	Dallara F305-Mercedes	(Indonesia) Zahir Ali	4	0	0	0	0	24th†	N/A
2009	Dallara F305-Mercedes	(Austria) Bernd Herndlhofer	2	0	0	0	32	8th†	N/A
2009	Dallara F305-Mercedes	(Switzerland) Sandro Zeller	2	0	0	0	0	NC‡	N/A
2009	Dallara F301-Opel	(Switzerland) Urs Rüttimann [T]	4	0	0	0	23	7th [T]	N/A
2010	Dallara F306-Mercedes	(Switzerland) Sandro Zeller	16	0	0	0	3	17th	N/A
2010	Dallara F305-Mercedes	(Netherlands) Nigel Melker	2	0	0	0	0	NC‡	N/A
2011	Dallara F306-Mercedes	(Switzerland) Sandro Zeller	6	0	0	0	5	15th	N/A
2011	Dallara F306-Mercedes	(Germany) Markus Pommer	6	0	1	1	52	7th†	N/A
2011	Dallara F305-Mercedes	(Austria) René Binder	15	0	0	0	26	8th	N/A
2013	Dallara F305-Mercedes	(Switzerland) Thomas Amweg [T]	2	0	0	0	110	7th† [T]	13th
2014	Dallara F305-Mercedes	(Switzerland) Thomas Amweg [G]	5	0	0	0	0	NC‡	NC

† – Shared results with other teams ‡ – Guest driver – ineligible for points.

=== Formula 3 Euro Series ===
Formula 3 Euro Series
Year	Car	Drivers	Races	Wins	Poles	F/Laps	Points	D.C.	T.C.
2006	Dallara F306-Opel	(Germany) Peter Elkmann	14	1	0	1	14	14th	6th
2006	Dallara F306-Opel	(Switzerland) Natacha Gachnang	4	0	0	0	0	24th†	6th
2007	Dallara F306-Mercedes	(Germany) Tim Sandtler	20	0	0	0	8	16th	6th
2008	Dallara F308-Mercedes	(Germany) Michael Klein	8	0	0	0	2	23rd	7th
2008	Dallara F308-Mercedes	(France) Tom Dillmann	2	0	0	0	8	18rd†	7th
2010	Dallara F306-Mercedes	(Switzerland) Sandro Zeller	4	0	0	0	0	NC‡	NC
2011	Dallara F306-Mercedes	(Switzerland) Sandro Zeller	4	0	0	0	0	NC‡	NC
2011	Dallara F308-Mercedes	(Switzerland) Sandro Zeller	2	0	0	0	0	NC‡	NC
2012	Dallara F308-Mercedes	(Switzerland) Sandro Zeller	24	0	0	0	23	12th	5th
2012	Dallara F312-Mercedes	(Italy) Andrea Roda	24	0	0	0	25	13th	5th

† – Shared results with other teams ‡ – As Zeller was a guest driver, he was ineligible for points.

=== Formula Lista Junior ===
Formula Lista Junior
Year	Drivers	Races	Wins	Poles	F/Laps	Points	D.C.	T.C.
2008	(Switzerland) Andrina Gugger	12	1	0	1	87	4th	N/A
2008	(Switzerland) Sandro Zeller	12	0	1	0	17	14th	N/A
2009	(Switzerland) Sandro Zeller	12	1	1	1	115	5th	N/A
2010	(United States) Michael Lamotte	12	5	3	4	191	1st	2nd
2011	(Switzerland) Levin Amweg	12	1	0	1	103	4th	3rd
2011	(Switzerland) Kevin Jörg	2	0	0	0	5	12th	3rd
Formula LO
2012	(Germany) Max Schaumburg-Lippe	6	0	0	0	42	7th	4th

=== FIA Formula 3 International Trophy ===
FIA Formula 3 International Trophy
Year	Car	Drivers	Races	Wins	Poles	F.Laps	Points	D.C.
2011	Dallara F306-Mercedes	(Switzerland) Sandro Zeller [G]	2	0	0	0	0	NC‡

‡ – As Zeller was a guest driver, he was ineligible for points.

=== FIA Formula 3 European Championship ===
FIA Formula 3 European Championship
Year	Car	Drivers	Races	Wins	Poles	F/Laps	Points	D.C.	T.C.
2012	Dallara F308-Mercedes	(Switzerland) Sandro Zeller	20	0	0	0	0	NC‡	N/A
2012	Dallara F312-Mercedes	(Italy) Andrea Roda	20	0	0	0	8	12th	N/A
2013	Dallara F312-Mercedes	(Switzerland) Sandro Zeller	30	0	0	0	0	27th	11th
2014	Dallara F312-Mercedes	(Switzerland) Sandro Zeller	24	0	0	0	0	27th	8th
2014	Dallara F312-Mercedes	(Colombia) Tatiana Calderón	30	0	0	0	29	15th	8th

‡ – As Zeller was a guest driver, he was ineligible for points.
