= Spiess Tuning =

Spiess Tuning is the common identity of Siegfried Spiess Motorenbau GmbH, a motor vehicle engine company based in Ditzingen, Baden-Württemberg, Germany.

Siegfried Spiess Motorenbau GmbH is a family-run company that develops, manufactures and services its own high-performance engines in second generation. Currently, three pillars form the Siegfried Spiess Motorenbau GmbH: Spiess RACing, Spiess Classic and Spiess CNC. Spiess RACing is responsible for the development, production and assembly of racing engines. This also includes the on-site support of the teams and drivers. Spiess Classic is mainly concerned with the design and restoration of young and classic car engines. Spiess CNC manufactures complex one-offs and also offers contract manufacturing, both for private individuals and for companies.

== Links ==
http://www.berg-meisterschaft.de/?page_id=814

Historie - S. Spiess Motorenbau GmbH (spiess-racing.de)

Helmut Henzler | Racing career profile | Driver Database (driverdb.com)

https://www.euroformulaopen.net/en/

https://superformula-lights.com/

https://formel3guide.com/
