= Satria =

Satria means knight or warrior in Indonesian language. Satria may refer to:

== People ==
- Satria Tama Hardiyanto (born 1997), Indonesian footballer
- Bobby Satria (born 1986), Indonesian footballer
- Satria gens, minor plebeian family in ancient Rome

== Products ==
- Proton Satria, hatchback automobile produced by Malaysian manufacturer Proton from 1994 to 2005
- Proton Satria R3, limited edition, track-focused version of Proton's Satria hatchback made by R3
- Suzuki Satria, underbone motorcycle manufactured by Suzuki, first released as a 2-stroke in Indonesia in 1997

== Other ==
- Satria Stadium, a sports stadium located in Purwokerto, Central Java, Indonesia
- Satria, a planned communications satellite by PT Pasifik Satelit Nusantara

== See also ==
- Sartoria
- Sataria
- Sathria
- Satra
- Sattriya
- Saturia
- Sauteria
