= VXR =

Discontinued subsidiary of Vauxhall

- Product type: Automotive industry
- Current owner: Vauxhall (Stellantis)
- Country: United Kingdom
- Introduced: 2004 (VXR); 2007 (VX Racing)
- Discontinued: 2017
- Related brands: VX Racing
- Markets: United Kingdom
- Tagline: Live The Change
- Website: vxr.co.uk
- Successor: GSi

VXR was the branding for the high performance trim specification, used since 2004 for models in many of Vauxhall's car range in the United Kingdom. Holden has also used the VXR badge for some of its high-performance cars such as the Astra VXR, Insignia VXR, and the Commodore VXR.

European sourced VXR models were produced and developed by Opel Performance Center, a division of Opel. The VXR8 was produced and developed by Holden Special Vehicles. The VXR brand was closely linked to VX Racing, Vauxhall's British Touring Car Championship team, and the VXR versions of the cars were race track styled models, with high performance capabilities.

The VXR brand was quietly discontinued with the end of production of the Corsa E in 2019, despite some of the motoring press speculating about its subsequent return in the years that followed.

== History ==
The VX Racing name was first used in 2003 instead of Vauxhall Motorsport, taking part in the BTCC with cars prepared by Triple 8 Race Engineering. The VXR badge was first launched in the summer of 2004, at the British Motor Show, with enhanced consumer versions of the Monaro and VX220. In 2005, the VXR range included the Astra VXR and subsequently Zafira, Vectra, Corsa, Insignia and Meriva versions.

It was launched following discussions with the Directors (K Grice, P Marshall and N Reed) and several Regional Organisers of the Vauxhall Sports Car Club, at the time the official club for owners and enthusiasts of Vauxhall performance models to replace the GSi branding (which itself replaced the GTE label) which was previously used on top end high performance models.

Shortly after the introduction of the VXR brand, a dedicated website and discussion forum, VXRonline, was set up by the Directors of the Vauxhall Sports Car Club to provide technical assistance, advice, meetings and events for all owners and enthusiasts of the VXR models.

== Former VXR models ==
Corsa (E) VXR

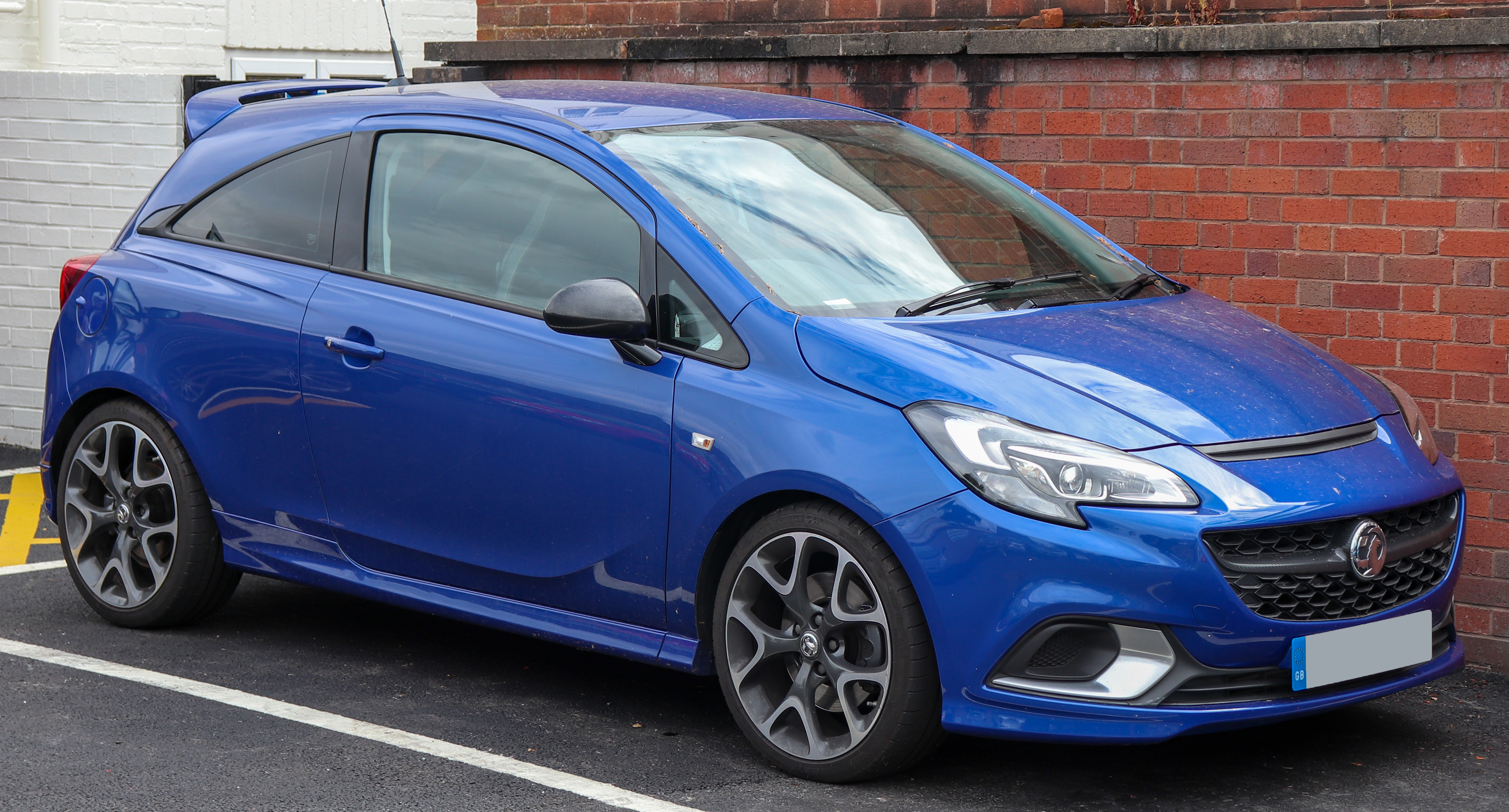
2015 Vauxhall Corsa VXR

- Launched 2015
- 1.6i Turbo 16v engine B16LER (uprated from previous Corsa VXR)
- 205 bhp (153 kW)
- LED running lights and bi xenon headlights
- VXR exterior and interior styling
- Twin Remus exhaust
- 0 to 62 mph (100 km/h) in 6.5 seconds
- Top speed of 143 mph (230 km/h)
- 17" alloys (optional 18")
- ESP stability control system
- Koni dampers
- Traction Control
- Heavily bolstered Recaro bucket seats and VXR badging
- Intellilink audio system
- Onstar
- 5 second Torque Overboost when fully depressing accelerator pedal

The Corsa VXR Performance Pack adds a Drexler limited slip differential, larger Brembo brakes (330 mm over standard 305 mm) and track grade suspension with retuned Koni dampers.

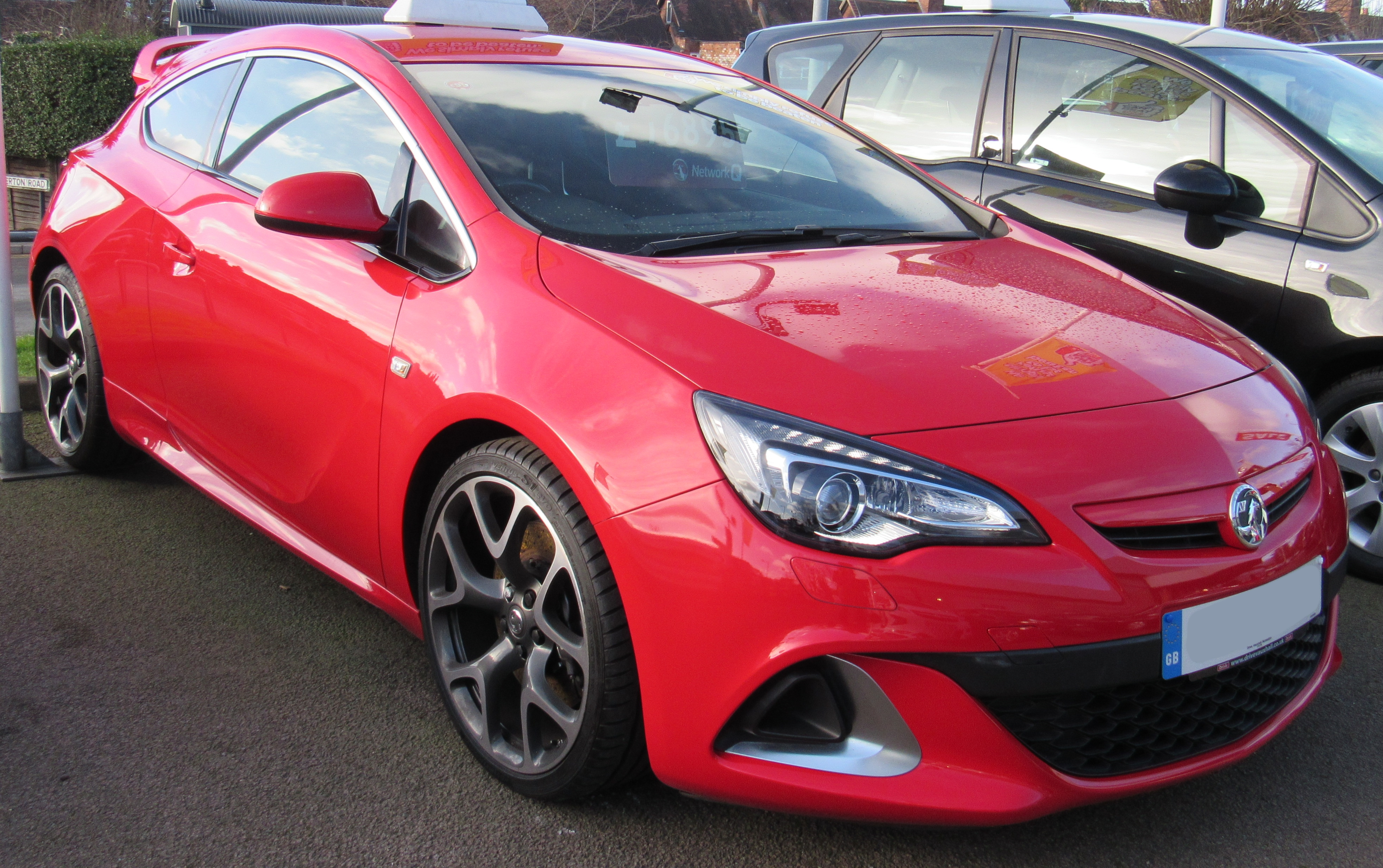
2015 Vauxhall Astra GTC VXR

Astra GTC VXR

- Only available in three door
- 2.0 litre four cylinder turbo producing 280 bhp (209 kW)
- 19" alloys or 20" forged alloys
- 0 to 62 mph (100 km/h) in 5.9 seconds
- Six speed manual transmission
- Recaro front sport seats
- Unique VXR gear knob, alloy pedals, still plates and flat bottom steering wheel
- Top speed: 155 mph (249 km/h) (electronically limited)
- Drexler limited slip differential
- Brembo brakes
- electro hydraulic power steering

Insignia VXR

- Available in the styles of the four door saloon, five door liftback, and five door sports tourer estate.
- 2.8 L (2,792 cc) turbo V6 engine producing 325 PS (321 bhp; 239 kW) at 5500 rpm and 435 N⋅m (321 lbf⋅ft) at 5500 rpm of torque.
- Six speed manual or automatic transmission
- Haldex all wheel drive
- 19" wheels (20" forged 7 spoke alloy wheels optional)
- 0 to 62 mph (100 km/h) in 5.6 seconds
- Interior features include Recaro front sport seats, VXR gear knob, alloy pedals, still plates and flat bottom steering wheel
- Navi 900 satellite navigation system
- Top speed: 155 mph (249 km/h) (electronically limited) 170 mph (274 km/h) (without limiter, i.e. with 'Unlimited' option)

VXR8 Bathurst S The Bathurst S version of the VXR8 became the most powerful ever Vauxhall to be offered, when it was launched in 2009.

- 6.2 litres (378 cu in) producing 565 bhp (421 kW)
- 0 to 60 mph (97 km/h) in 4.9 seconds (manual version)
- Electrically adjustable leather covered sports front seats
- Traction Control System (TCS)
- Six disc in dash CD player. MP3 compatible and Bluetooth, with eleven speakers including sub woofers
- Leather covered sports steering wheel
- Cruise control
- 21" inch hand smithed g6 twin spoke alloy wheels
- Aluminium VXR badged pedals
- Top speed of 201 mph (323 km/h)

VXR220 (2004–2005)

The VXR220 is a limited-edition version of the Lotus Elise based Vauxhall VX220, with a small production run of 65 vehicles. It was powered by a four-cylinder 2.0i turbo 16v engine producing 217 bhp (162 kW) at 6300 rpm and 210 lb⋅ft (285 N⋅m) of torque at 4800 rpm. It could accelerate from 0-60 mph (97 km/h) in 4.2 seconds and reach a top speed of 149 mph (240 km/h).

The VXR220 was fitted with five spoke Speedline satin black alloy wheels with 195/50R16 Yokohama A048R LTS tyres at the front and 225/45R17 Yokohama A048R LTS tyres at the back and uprated brakes with 288 mm discs.

Monaro VXR (2005–2007)

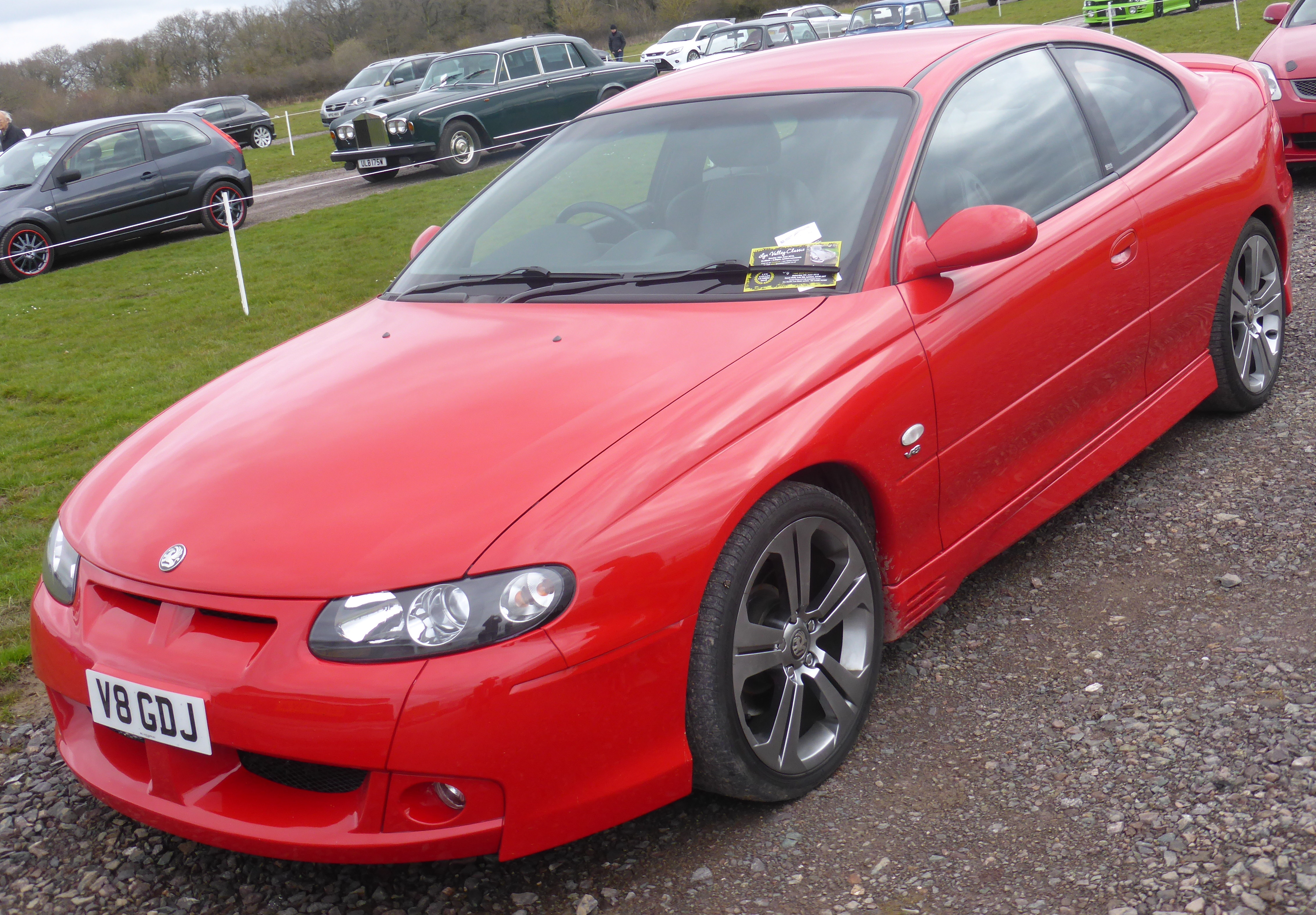
Vauxhall Monaro VXR

The Vauxhall Monaro VXR is a rebadged HSV GTO with a six-litre V8 engine producing 398 bhp (297 kW) at 6000 rpm and 391 lb⋅ft (530 N⋅m) of torque. It could accelerate from 0-62 mph (100 km/h) in 5.3 seconds and reach a top speed of 170 mph (274 km/h).

The Monaro featured a different grille, wide lower air intake and bonnet scoops, side sills with 'shark gills' and unique 19-inch (480 mm) alloy wheels and VXR branded brake calipers on later build numbers. It was replaced by the four door VXR8, also from Holden.

Astra VXR (2005–2011)

The original hot hatch Astra VXR was announced in January 2005, and went on sale in the summer of 2005. Based on the Vauxhall Astra Mark 5, it was fitted with a 2.0i turbo 16V engine (Z20LEH) producing 236 bhp (176 kW).

It could accelerate 0 to 62 mph (100 km/h) in 6.2 seconds and reach a top speed of 152 mph (245 km/h). Externally, it was different from the standard Astra with a central trapezoidal rear exhaust, 18" six spoke alloy wheels with 225/40R18 tyres (optional 19" ten spoke wheels), lowered and uprated suspension and VXR front fog lamps and other external styling including spoiler.

Corsa VXR

Launched mid April 2007

- 1.6i Turbo 16v engine A16LER (Z16LER <2010)
- Light weight body panels
- 189 brake horsepower (141 kW)
- Large front air intakes with honeycomb grilles, bulging wheel arches and ground hugging front spoiler
- Rear venturi style bumper
- Central trapezoidal exhaust
- 0 to 62 mph (100 km/h) in 6.8 seconds
- Top speed of 140 mph (225 km/h)
- 17" alloys (optional 18")
- ESP stability control system
- Traction Control
- Heavily bolstered Recaro bucket seats and VXR badging
- MP3 compatible sound system
- Five second Torque Overboost when fully depressing accelerator pedal

The Corsa VXR Nurburgring Edition, released in 2011, features a reworked version of the VXR's 1.6 litre turbo engine, as well as a sports exhaust and a modified turbocharger system.

Zafira VXR (2005–2010)

The seven seat Zafira VXR compact MPV was launched at the end of 2005, and sharing the same turbocharged 2.0 four cylinder engine of the Astra VXR, producing 237 bhp (177 kW; 240 PS). It could accelerate 0 to 62 mph (100 km/h) 7.2 seconds and reach a top speed of 144 mph (232 km/h). It could be identified by the VXR bodykit, twin trapezoidal rear exhausts and 18" alloy wheels. It was claimed as the fastest MPV in production

Vectra VXR (2005–2009)

The Vectra VXR was available in both hatchback and estate versions, fitted with 2.8i 24v V6 turbo engine and was based on the Opel Vectra OPC. Originally launched in December 2005, it produced 252 bhp (188 kW; 255 PS) and after the facelift of 2007, the output increased to 276 bhp (206 kW; 280 PS).

This post 2007 version could accelerate from 0 to 60 mph (97 km/h) in 6.1 seconds for the hatchback, 6.3 seconds for the estate, and had a claimed top speed of 161 mph (260 km/h) (hatchback), 158 mph (250 km/h) (estate). The Vectra was equipped with 18" five spoke alloy wheels with 225/45R18 tyres (optional 19" ten spoke wheels) and upgraded brakes (345 mm discs on front wheels, 292 mm on rear wheels). It was replaced by the Insignia VXR.

Meriva VXR (2006–2009)

The Meriva VXR is an unusual sporting version of the Vauxhall Meriva mini MPV. Fitted with a 1.6 turbo 16V engine producing 178 bhp (133 kW; 180 PS), it could reach a top speed of 137 mph (220 km/h) and accelerate to 60 mph (97 km/h) in 7.9 seconds. It was equipped with 17" six spoke alloy wheels and brakes of 308 mm front discs, 264 mm rear discs.

== See also ==
- Irmscher
- Steinmetz Opel Tuning
- Holden Special Vehicles
- Opel Performance Center
