= Opel GSe models =

Grand Sport Electric
- Company type: Division
- Industry: Vehicle engineering
- Predecessor: Opel Performance Center
- Founded: Rüsselsheim, Germany (2022)
- Headquarters: Rüsselsheim, Germany
- Products: High-performance cars; specialist body styling parts; automotive consumer goods
- Owner: Stellantis
- Parent: Opel

Opel Grand Sport Electric (GSe) is the replacement of the defunct Opel Performance Center (OPC), the high-performance division of the German carmaker, Opel.

== History ==
The abbreviation used to stand for Grand Sport Einspritzung, as in the case of the Opel Commodore GS/E and the Opel Monza GSE, but now it means Grand Sport Electric.

The Grand Sport Electric sub-brand for sporty models was established in September 2022, with the Astra L.

Prior to GSe models, Opel used the Opel Performance Center (OPC) designation for its high performance and hot hatch derivatives.

== GSe models ==
The retail versions developed by GSe are sold under the Opel brand, as special versions of the standard Opel vehicles.

Models:

- 2022–present Opel Astra GSe
- 2022–present Opel Grandland GSe - a version of the Opel Grandland, which has a 1.6 litre turbo engine and two electric with 221 kW (300 hp). The car can accelerate from 0 to 100 km/h (62 mph) in 6.1 seconds.

== Concept cars ==
2023 - Opel Experimental
