= S. spongiosa =

S. spongiosa may refer to:

- Sauteria spongiosa, a liverwort species
- Scorias spongiosa, a sooty mould fungus species
- Spongiochloris spongiosa, a green alga species
