= Opel Performance Center =

German automobile manufacturer division

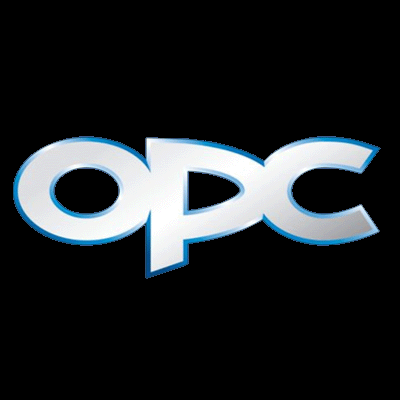
- Type: Division
- Industry: Vehicle engineering
- Founded: Rüsselsheim, Germany (1997)
- Defunct: 2022
- Successor: Opel GSe
- Headquarters: Rüsselsheim, Germany
- Key people: Volker Strycek, Managing Director
- Products: High-performance cars; specialist body styling parts; automotive consumer goods
- Owner: Stellantis
- Parent: Opel
- Website: opel-opc.ie

Opel Performance Center (OPC) was a division of the German automobile manufacturer Opel, initially set up as a subsidiary in 1997. The main focus of OPC is the development of performance derivatives of the Opel range, such as the hot hatch Corsa OPC and Astra OPC.

With the Insignia B OPC Line being discontinued in 2022, the OPC sub-brand will be replaced by GSe, which now stands for Grand Sport electric.

The OPC name is also used in some motorsport activities such as the VLN. In the United Kingdom, where Opel vehicles are sold under the Vauxhall marque, the VXR name is used instead. Former DTM racer Volker Strycek is managing director of Opel Performance Center.

== History ==
Opel Performance Center GmbH was established in 1997. The first OPC car was an Astra G launched in 1999.

Prior to OPC models, Opel used the Grand Sport Injection (GSi) designation in the mid 1980s and the end of the 1990s for its high performance and hot hatch derivatives. Opel has offered many GSi models, e.g. the Manta B GSi, Kadett E GSi or Astra F GSi. The last vehicle with the GSi moniker was the Corsa C GSi, which was offered in the Opel model range until 2004. After three years, Opel decided to use the GSi moniker for the Corsa D in 2007.

With the Insignia B OPC Line being discontinued in 2022, the OPC sub-brand will be replaced by GSe, which now stands for Grand Sport electric.

== OPC models ==
The retail versions developed by OPC are sold under the Opel brand, as special versions of the standard Opel vehicles. They are typically painted in a bright shade of blue, called Arden Blue (though other colours are also available). Their competition in Europe are, e.g. the ST versions of Ford's European range and Volkswagen's GTI and R range. In the United Kingdom, Vauxhall's versions of OPC models are badged as VXR.

=== Previous models ===
OPC has developed the following special versions of Opel vehicles:

- 1998–2004 Opel Vectra – a version of the sedan and hatchback.
- 1999–2004 Opel Astra G OPC – a version of the three door hatchback and five door station wagon (Caravan) Astra G which has a 2.0 litre engine with 118 kW (158 hp; 160 PS) and a 2.0 litre turbo engine with 147 kW (197 hp; 200 PS).
- 2001–2006 Opel Zafira A OPC – a version of the Opel Zafira A compact MPV which has a 2.0 litre turbo engine with 141 kW (189 hp; 192 PS).
- 2005–2011 Opel Astra H OPC – again, based on the three door Astra, this time the three door hatchback (GTC) version of the Astra H.
- 2005–2010 Opel Zafira B OPC – a version of the Opel Zafira B compact MPV.
- 2005–2008 Opel Vectra C OPC – a version of the Opel Vectra C five door liftback (GTS) and five door station wagon (Caravan).
- 2006–2010 Opel Meriva A OPC – a version of the Opel Meriva mini MPV.
- 2007–2014 Opel Corsa D OPC – a version of the Opel Corsa D three door hatchback, which has a 1.6 litre turbo engine with 141 kW (189 hp; 192 PS).
- 2009–2017 Opel Insignia OPC – a version of the Opel Insignia five door liftback, four door saloon and five door station wagon (Sports Tourer) which has a 2.8 litre V6 turbo engine with 239 kW (321 hp; 325 PS) and standard all wheel drive.
- 2012–2015 Opel Astra J OPC – a version of the Opel Astra GTC compact sports car which has a 2.0 litre turbo engine with 206 kW (276 hp; 280 PS).
- 2014–2019 Opel Corsa E OPC – a version of the Opel Corsa E three door hatchback.
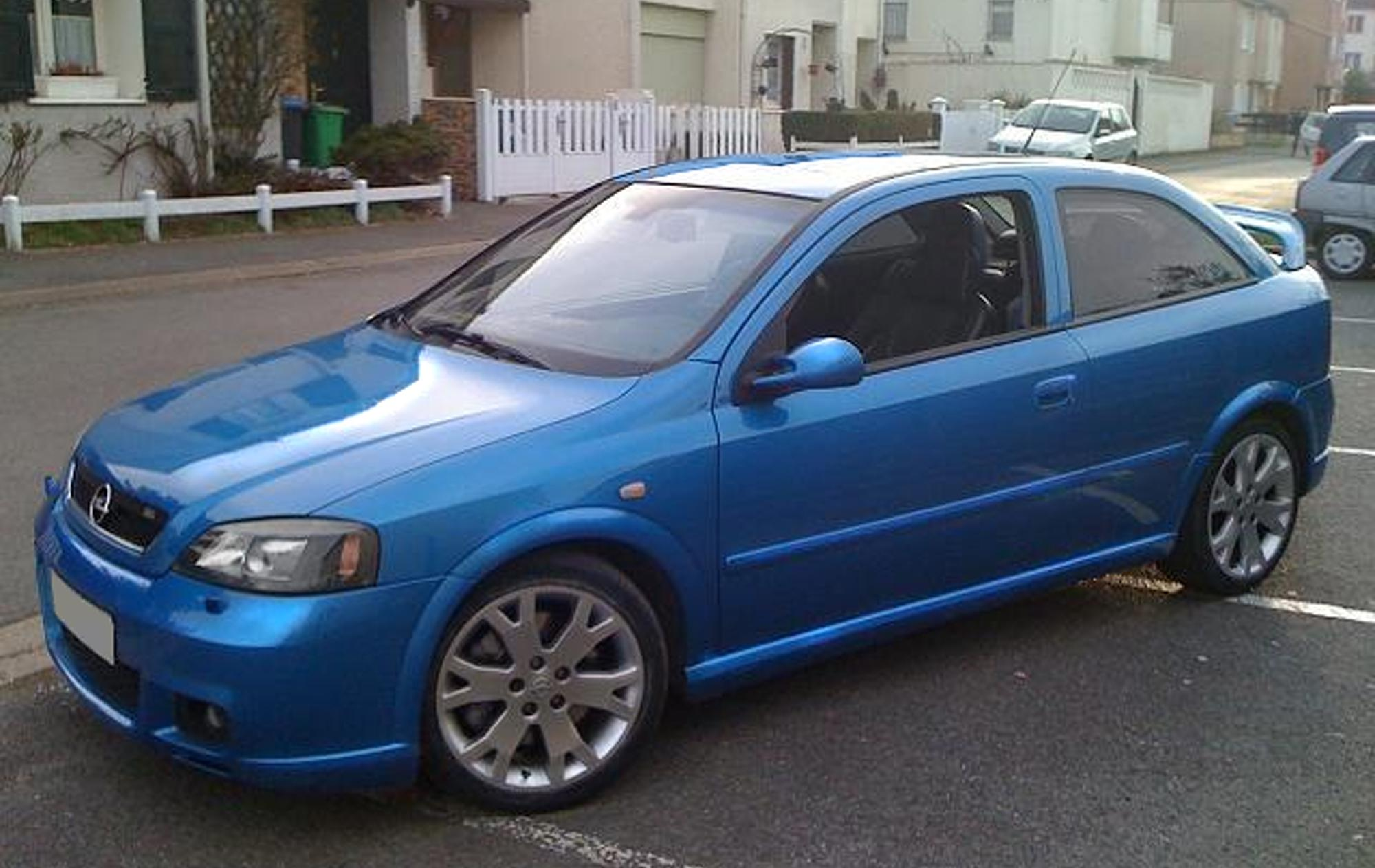
Opel Astra G OPC

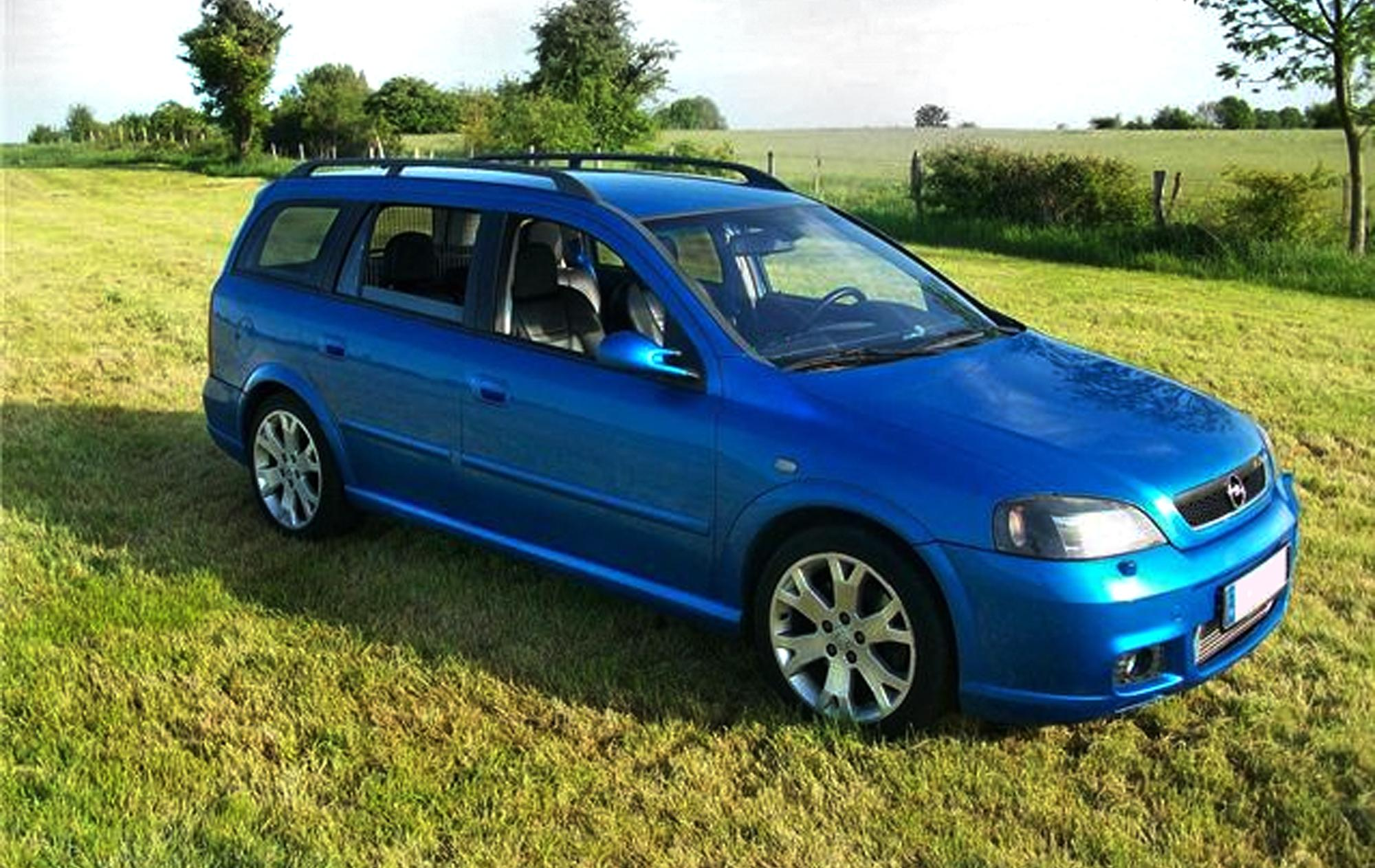
Opel Astra G OPC Caravan

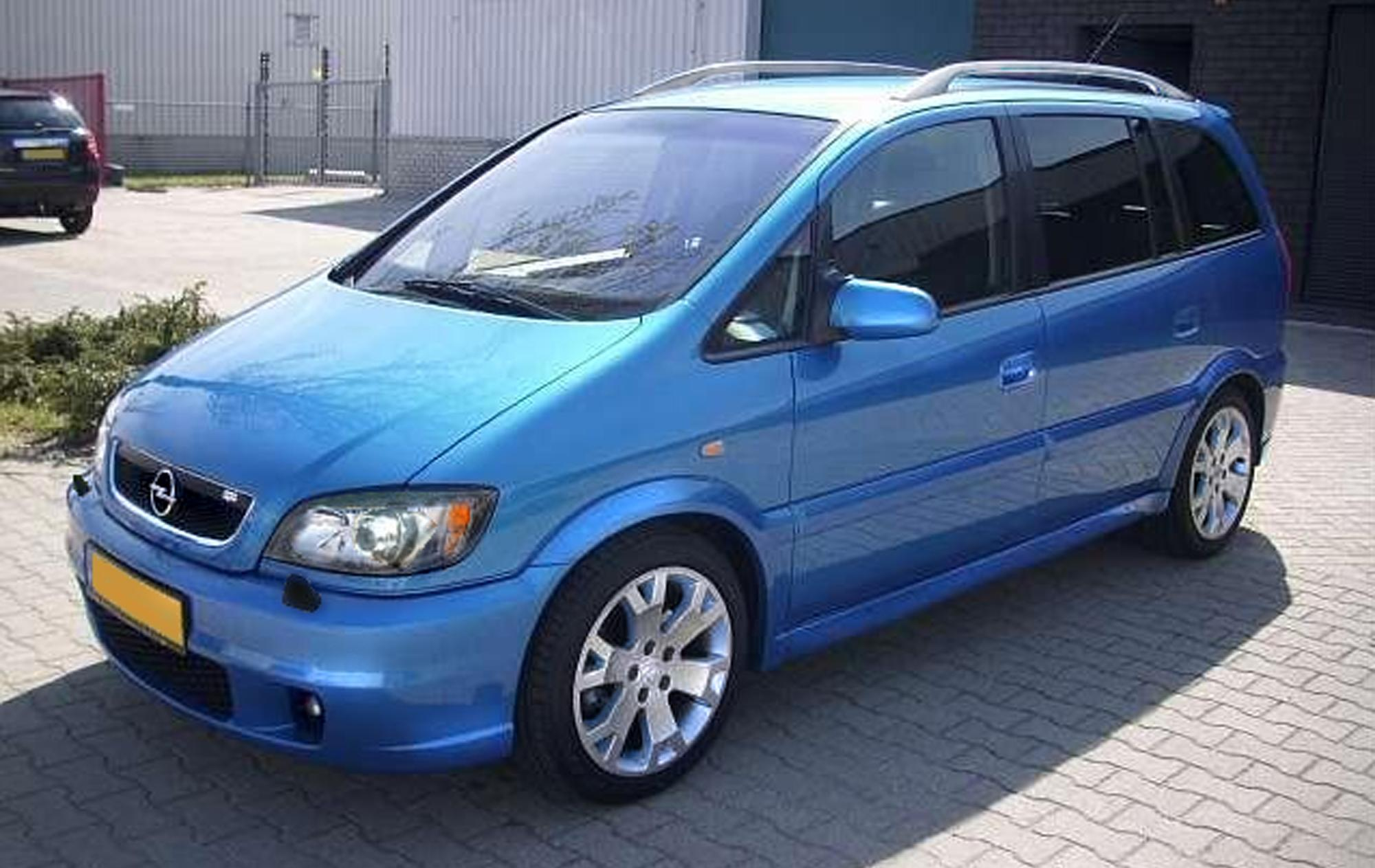
Opel Zafira A OPC

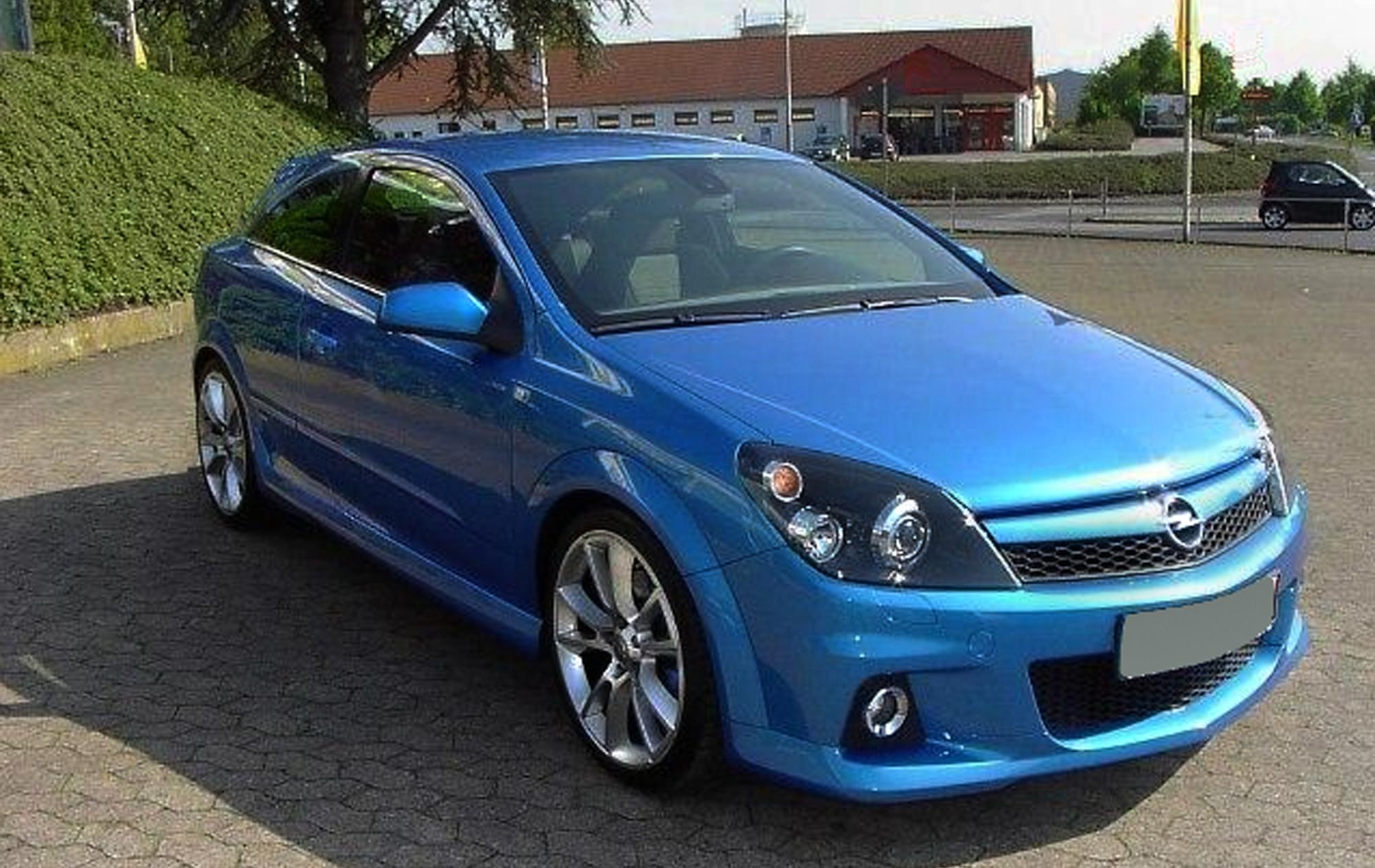
Opel Astra H OPC

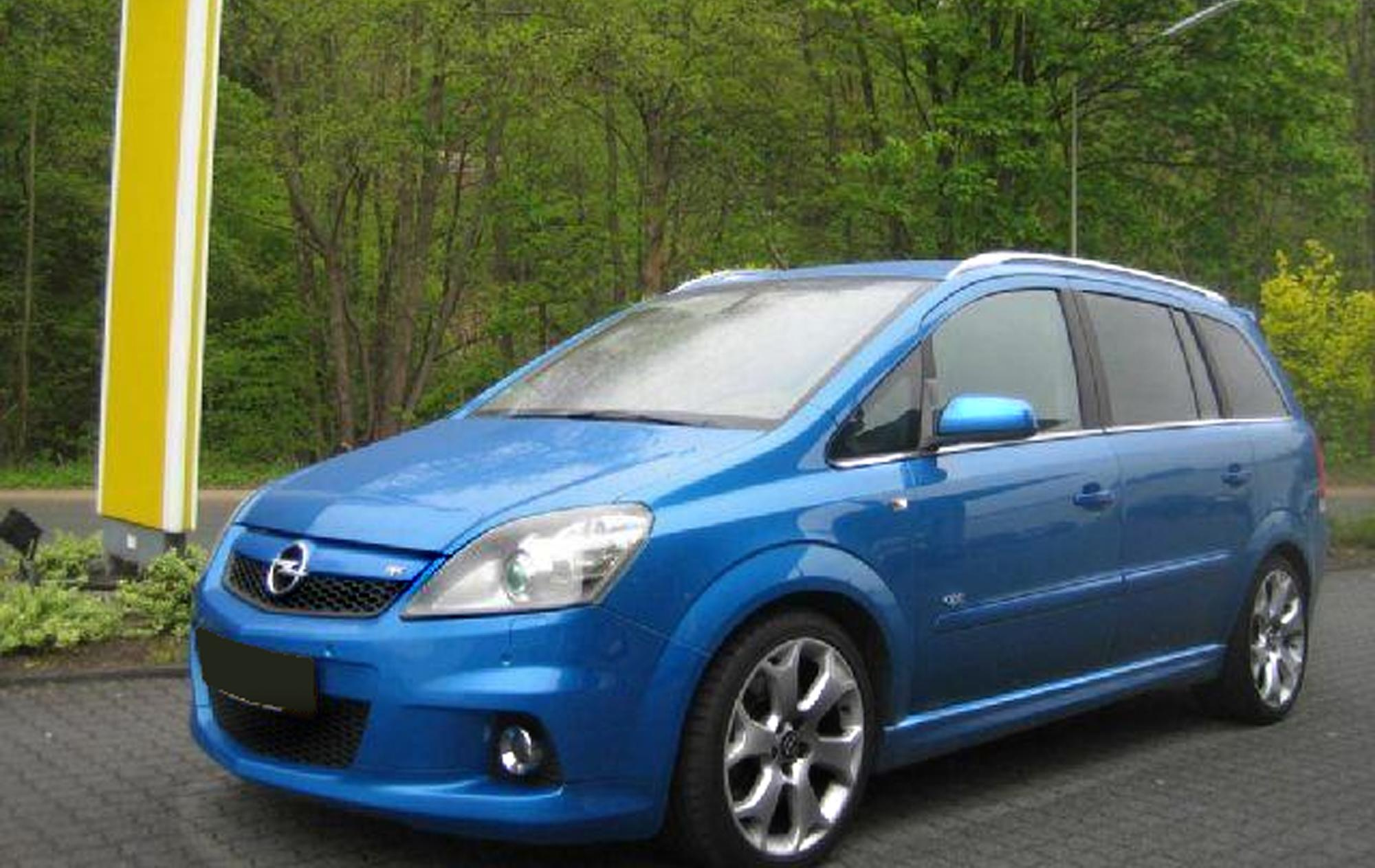
Opel Zafira B OPC

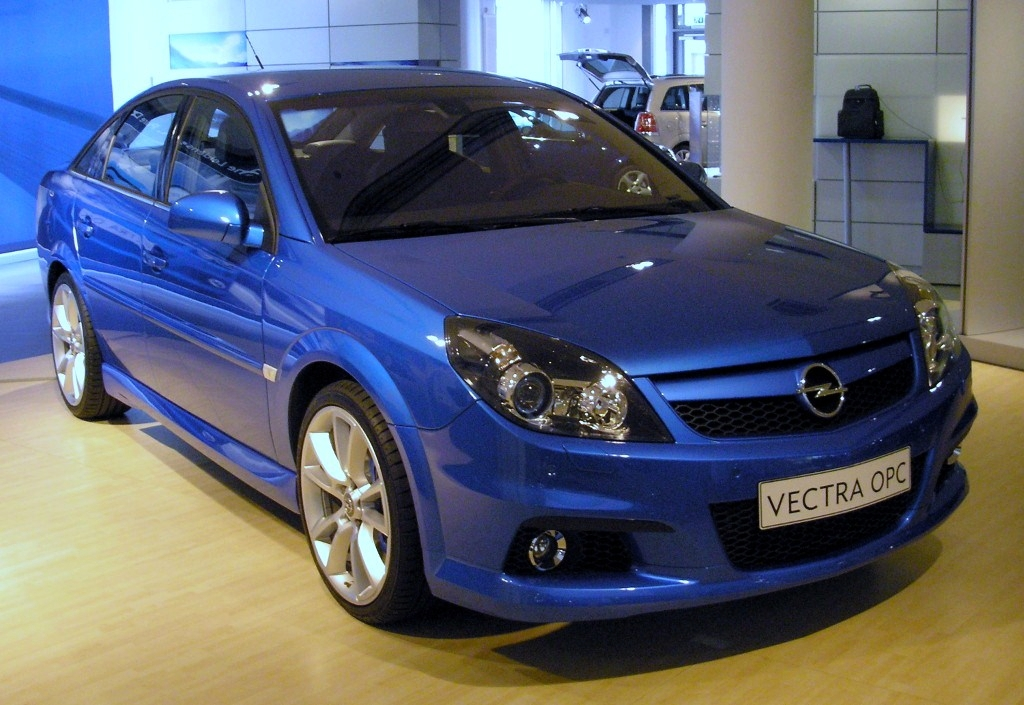
Opel Vectra C OPC

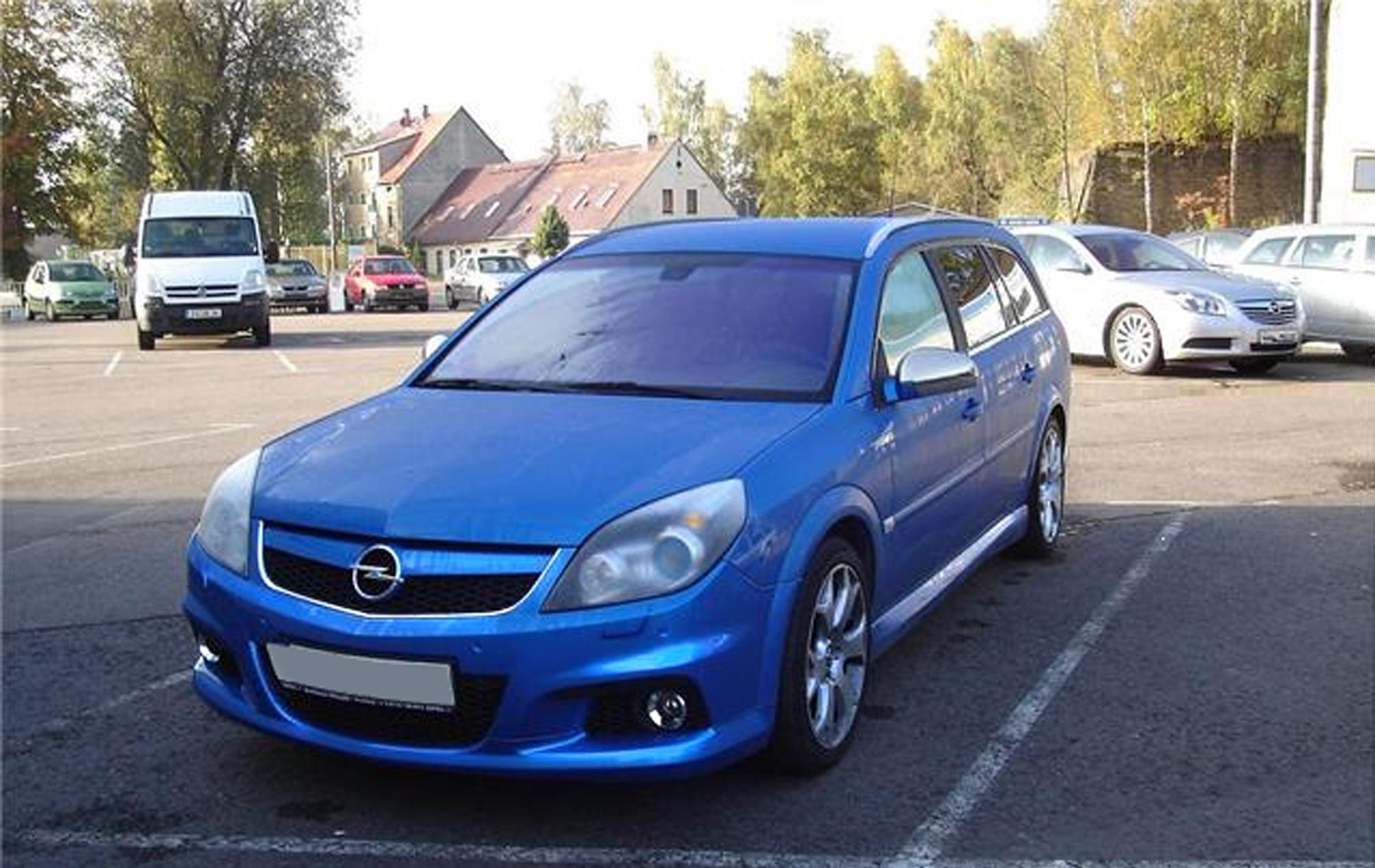
Opel Vectra C OPC Caravan (facelift)

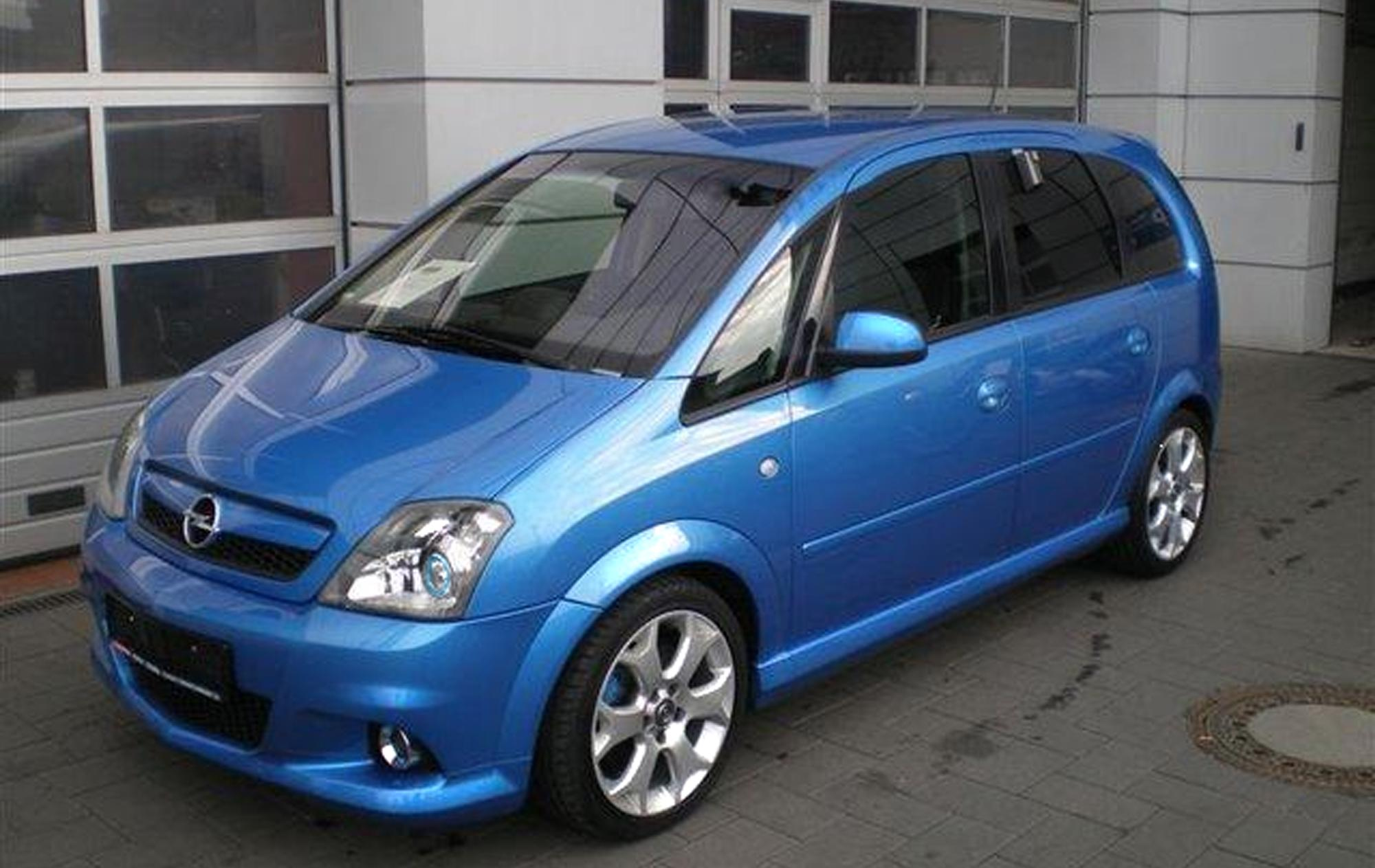
Opel Meriva A OPC

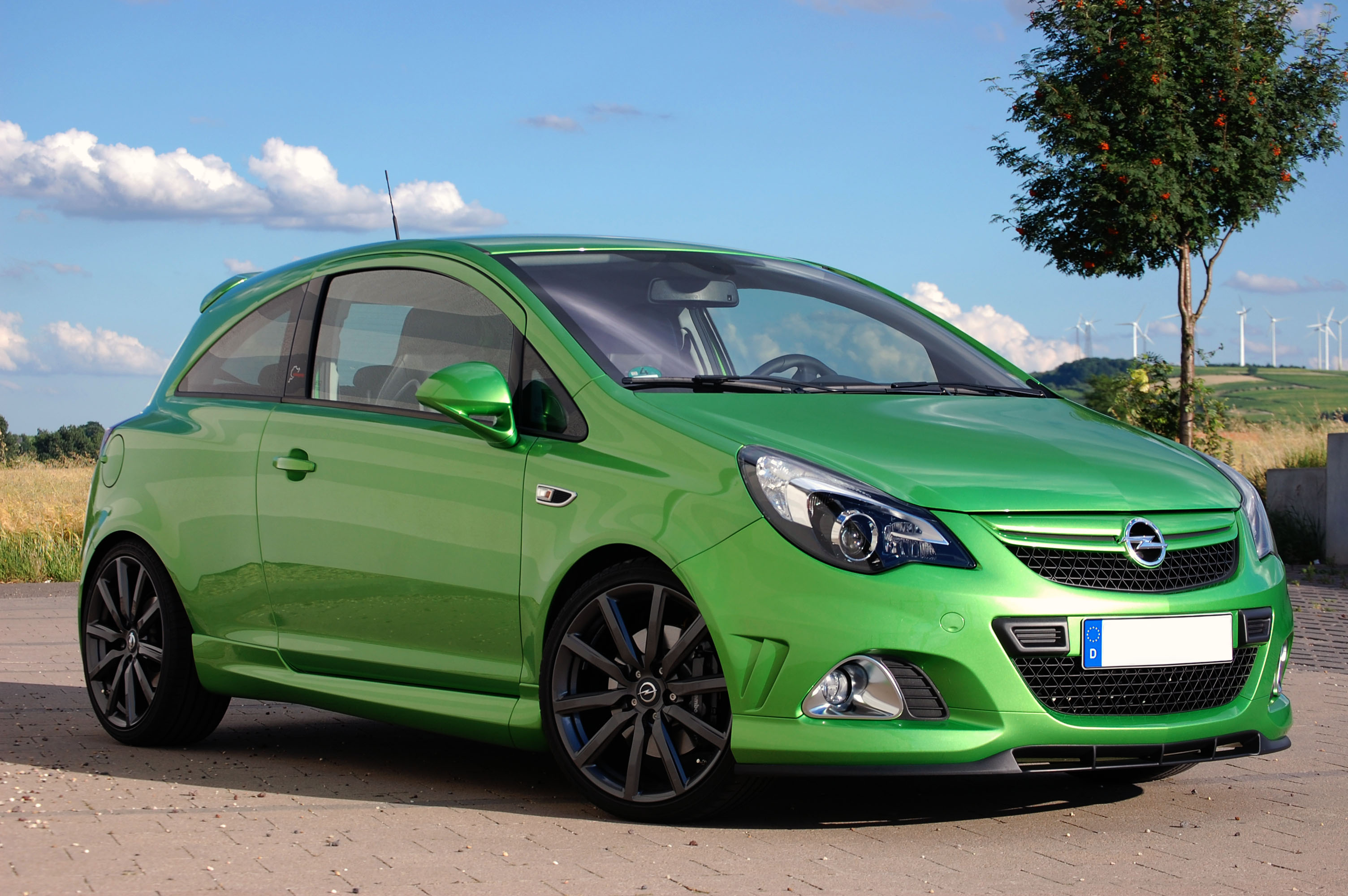
Opel Corsa D OPC (facelift)

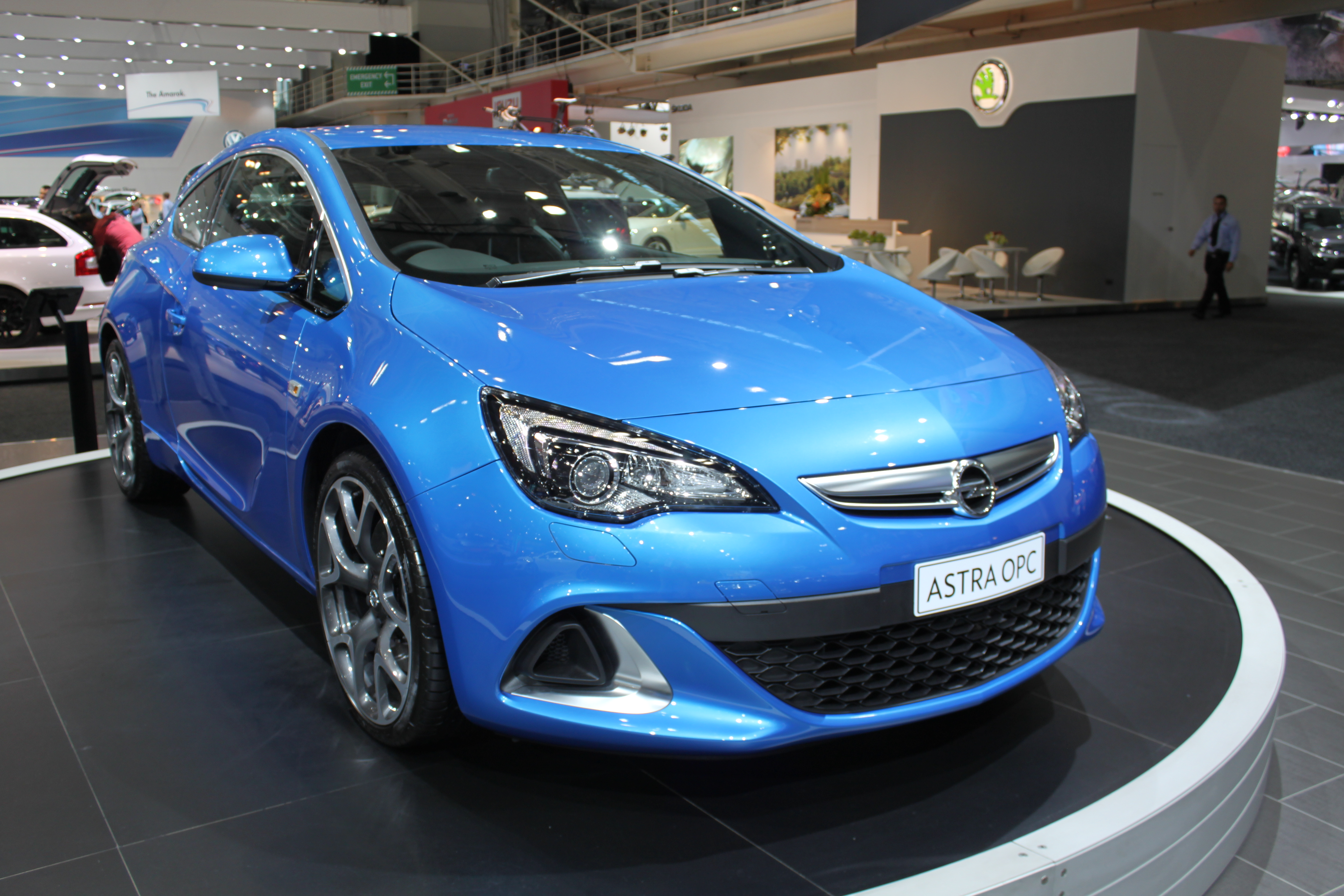
Opel Astra J OPC

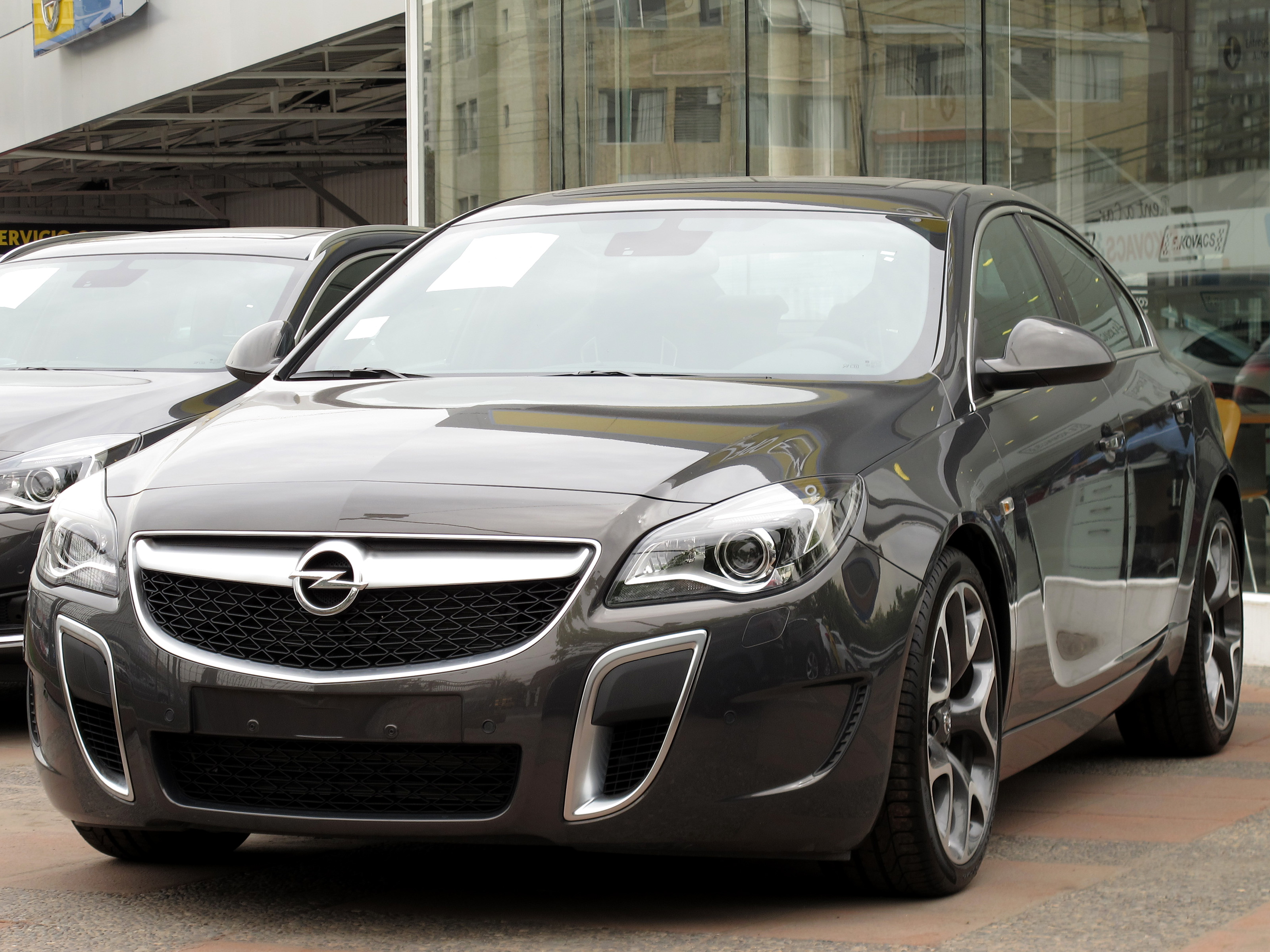
Opel Insignia OPC (facelift)

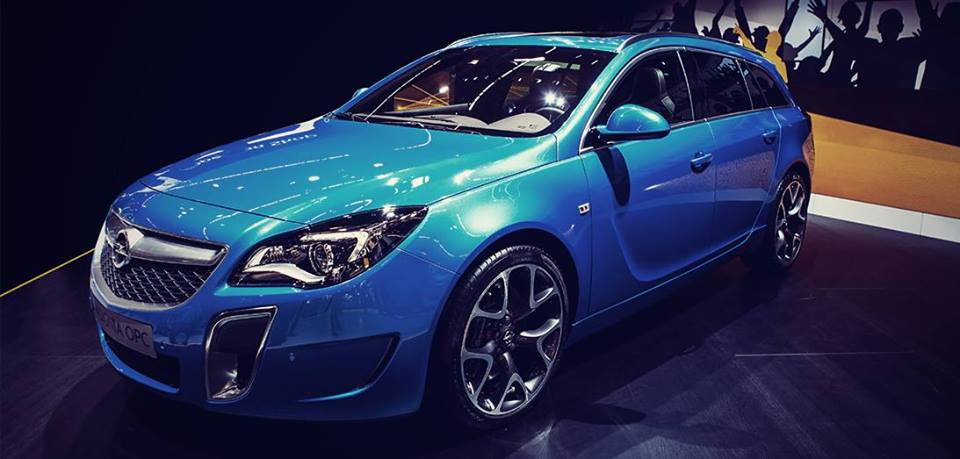
Opel Insignia OPC Sports Tourer (facelift)

== Concept cars ==
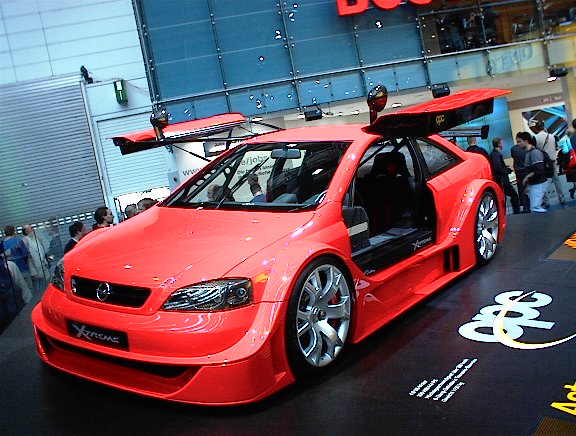
Opel Astra G OPC X-Treme Concept

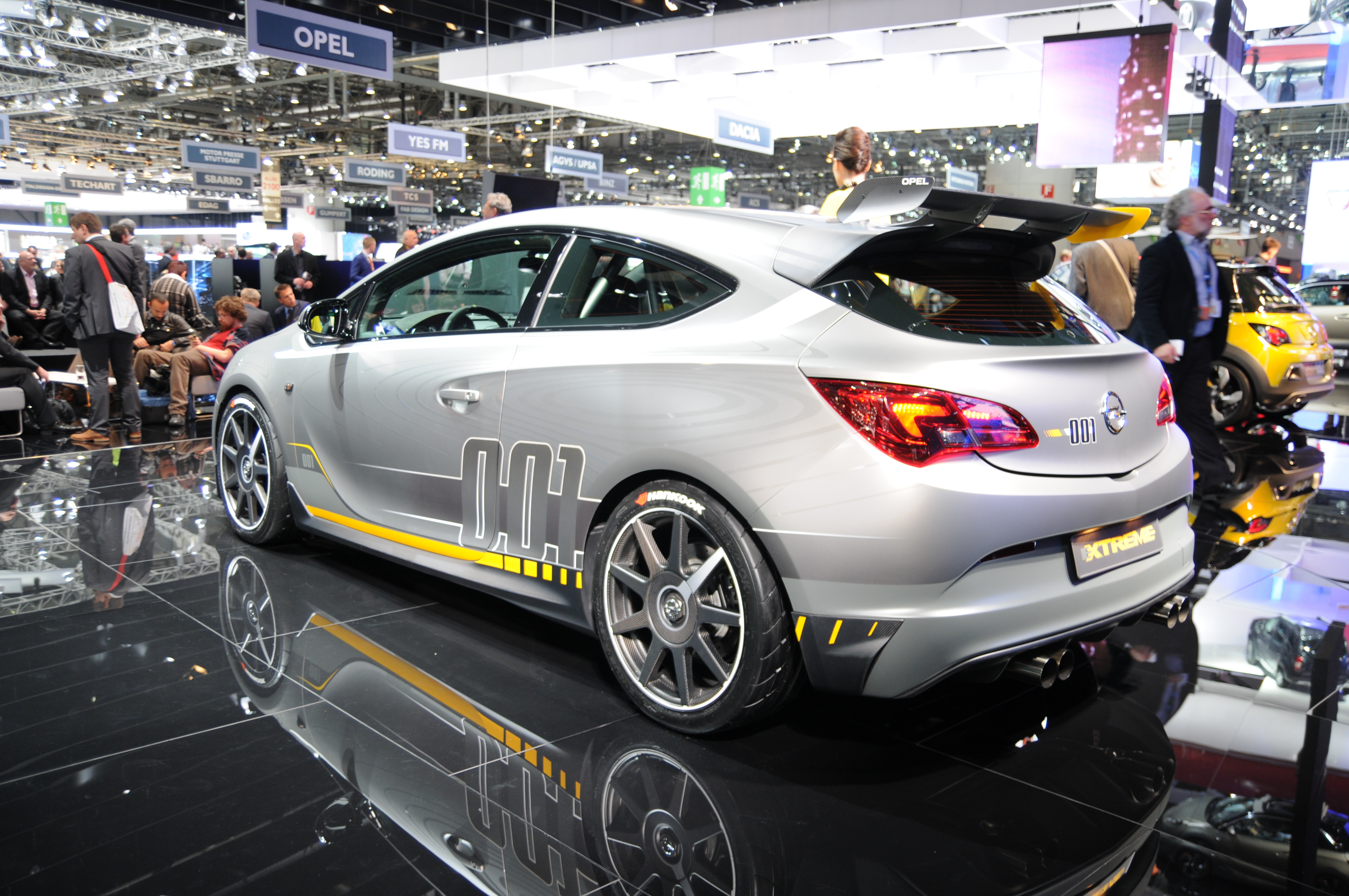
Opel Astra J OPC Extreme

Over the fifteen years of existence, OPC presented the following concept cars:

- 2001 Opel Astra Coupe OPC X-Treme – based on the DTM V8 powered version of the Opel Astra Coupe.
- 2002 Opel Corsa OPC – a very production ready version of the three door Opel Corsa C that, however, never made it to production.
- 2003 Opel Vectra OPC – contrary to the commercial Vectra OPC, this one was based on the pre facelift Vectra GTS and was powered by a tuned 1.9 CDTI engine.
- 2004 Opel Astra High Performance Concept – a study version of the later 2005 Opel Astra H OPC, but painted in "power red".
- 2014 Opel Astra J OPC EXTREME – a super sports car version of the Opel Astra J GTC.

== Motorsport ==
In November 2012, Opel announced the formation of the "Astra OPC Cup" at the 2013 VLN. In racing configuration, the Astra OPC is equipped with various carbon fibre components and makes 300 hp (224 kW; 304 PS) and 400 N⋅m (295 lb⋅ft) of torque.

== Slogans ==
OPC's corporate tagline is "OPC. Pure Passion".

== See also ==
- Irmscher
- Steinmetz Opel Tuning
- VXR
- VX Racing
- Holden Special Vehicles
