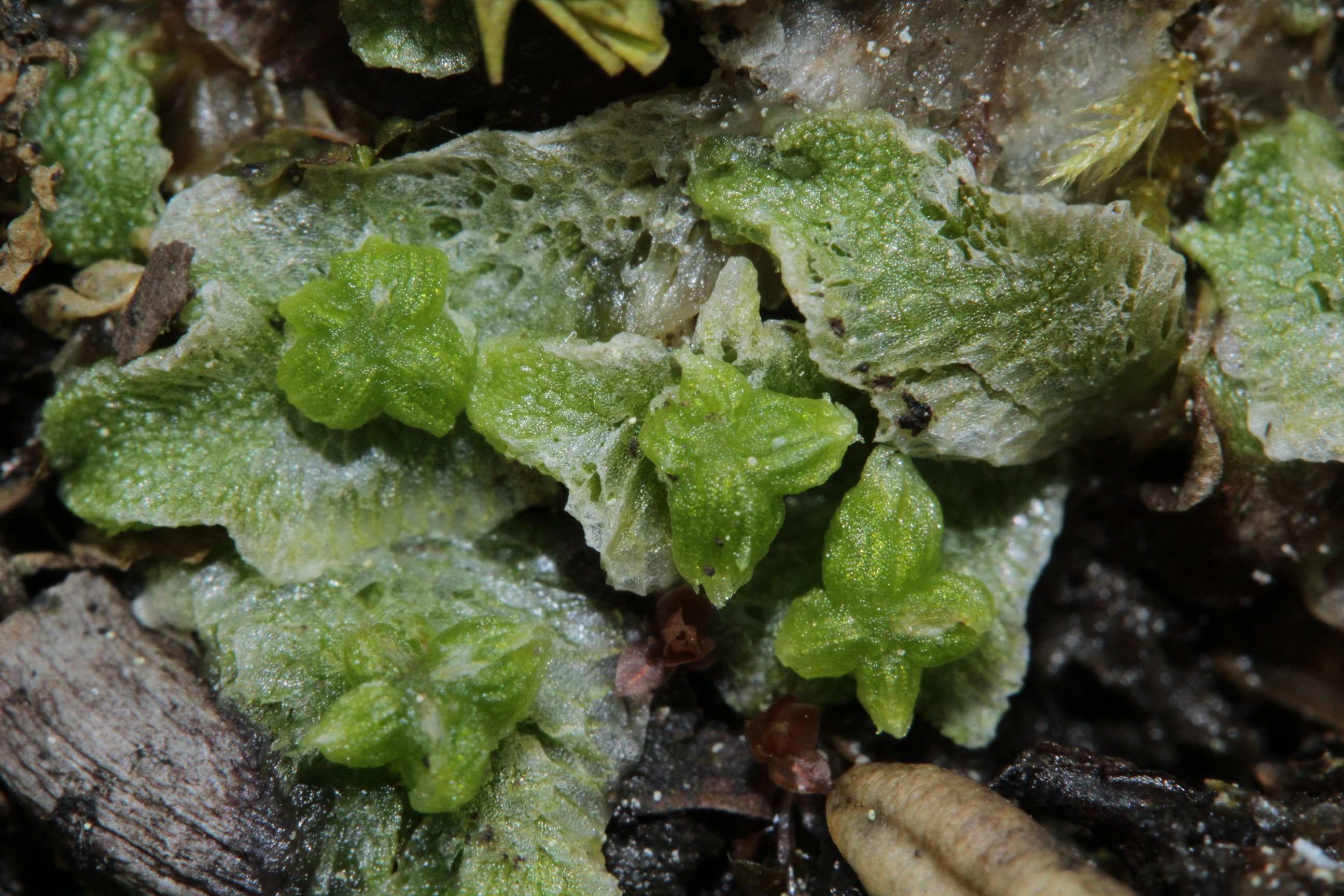
- Sauteria alpina

Scientific classification
- Kingdom: Plantae
- Division: Marchantiophyta
- Class: Marchantiopsida
- Order: Marchantiales
- Family: Cleveaceae
- Genus: Sauteria; Nees

= Sauteria =

Genus of liverworts

Sauteria is a genus of liverwort in the family Cleveaceae. It contains the following species:

- Sauteria alpina (Nees & Bisch.) Nees
- Sauteria berteroana Mont. [Unresolved]
- Sauteria chilensis (Lindenb. ex Mont.) Grolle
- Sauteria grandis S.O. Lindberg [Unresolved]
- Sauteria inflata C. Gao & G.C. Zhang
- Sauteria japonica (Shimizu & S. Hatt.) S. Hatt.
- Sauteria spongiosa (Kashyap) S. Hatt.
- Sauteria yatsuensis S. Hatt.
