= Sataria =

Scientific classification
- Kingdom: Animalia
- Phylum: Arthropoda
- Subphylum: Chelicerata
- Class: Arachnida
- Order: Opiliones
- Family: Sclerosomatidae
- Subfamily: Gagrellinae
- Genus: Sataria; Roewer, 1915

Genus of harvestmen/daddy longlegs

Sataria is a genus of harvestmen in the family Sclerosomatidae from India.

== Species ==
- Sataria coronata Roewer, 1929
- Sataria maculata Roewer, 1915
- Sataria unicolor Roewer, 1915

== Etymology ==
Initial two species were described from Satara district of Maharashtra, India.
