= Hot hatch =

Faster version of a mass-produced hatchback car

A hot hatch (shortened from hot hatchback) is a high-performance variant of a hatchback car. The term originated in the mid-1980s; however, sportier factory versions of hatchbacks have been produced since the 1970s. A front-engine, front-wheel-drive layout that uses petrol for fuel is the most common choice of powertrain, however all-wheel drive has become more commonly used since around 2010. Most hot hatches are of European or Asian origin.

Modern hot hatches

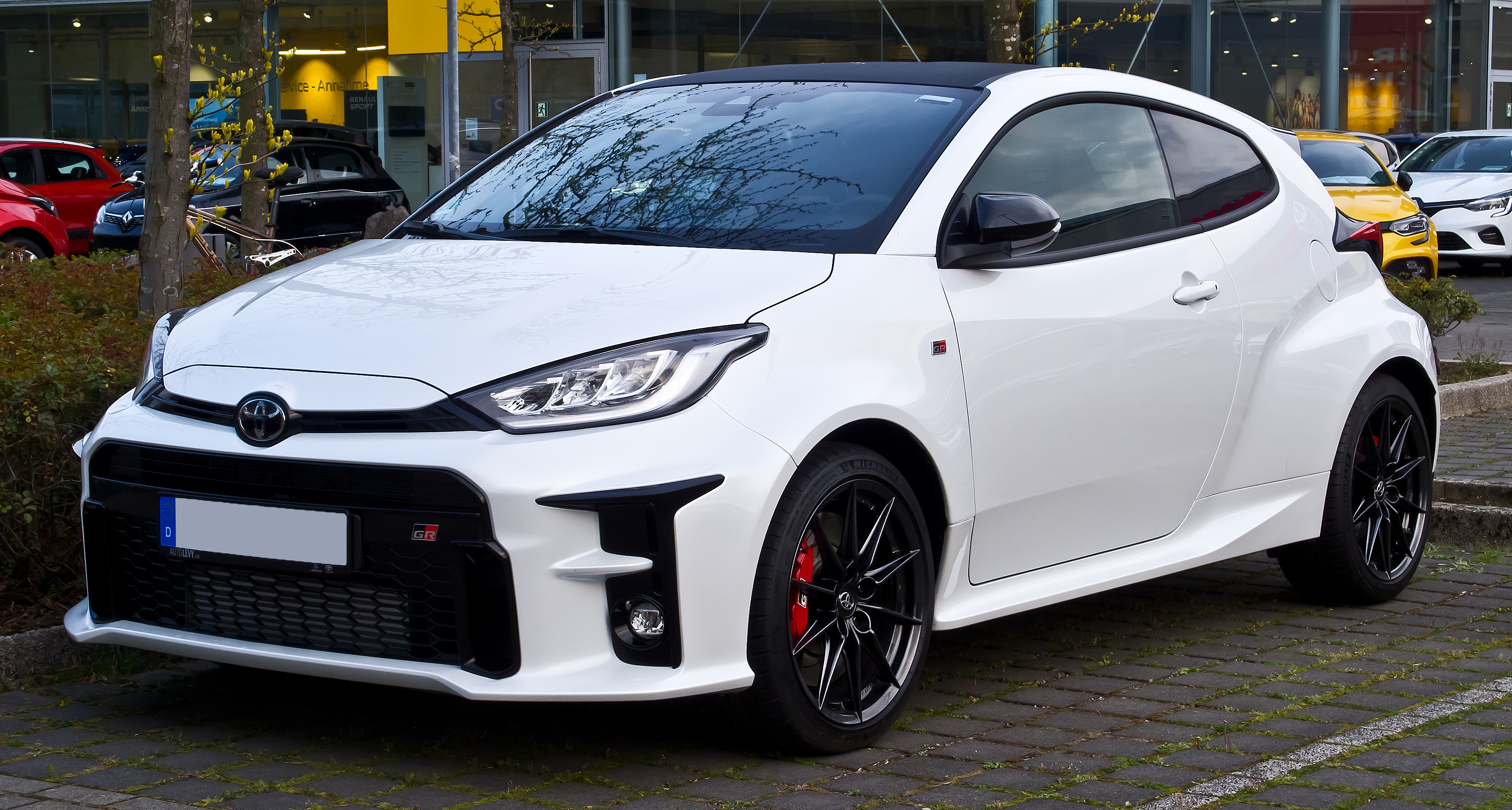
Toyota GR Yaris (XP210) (2020–present)

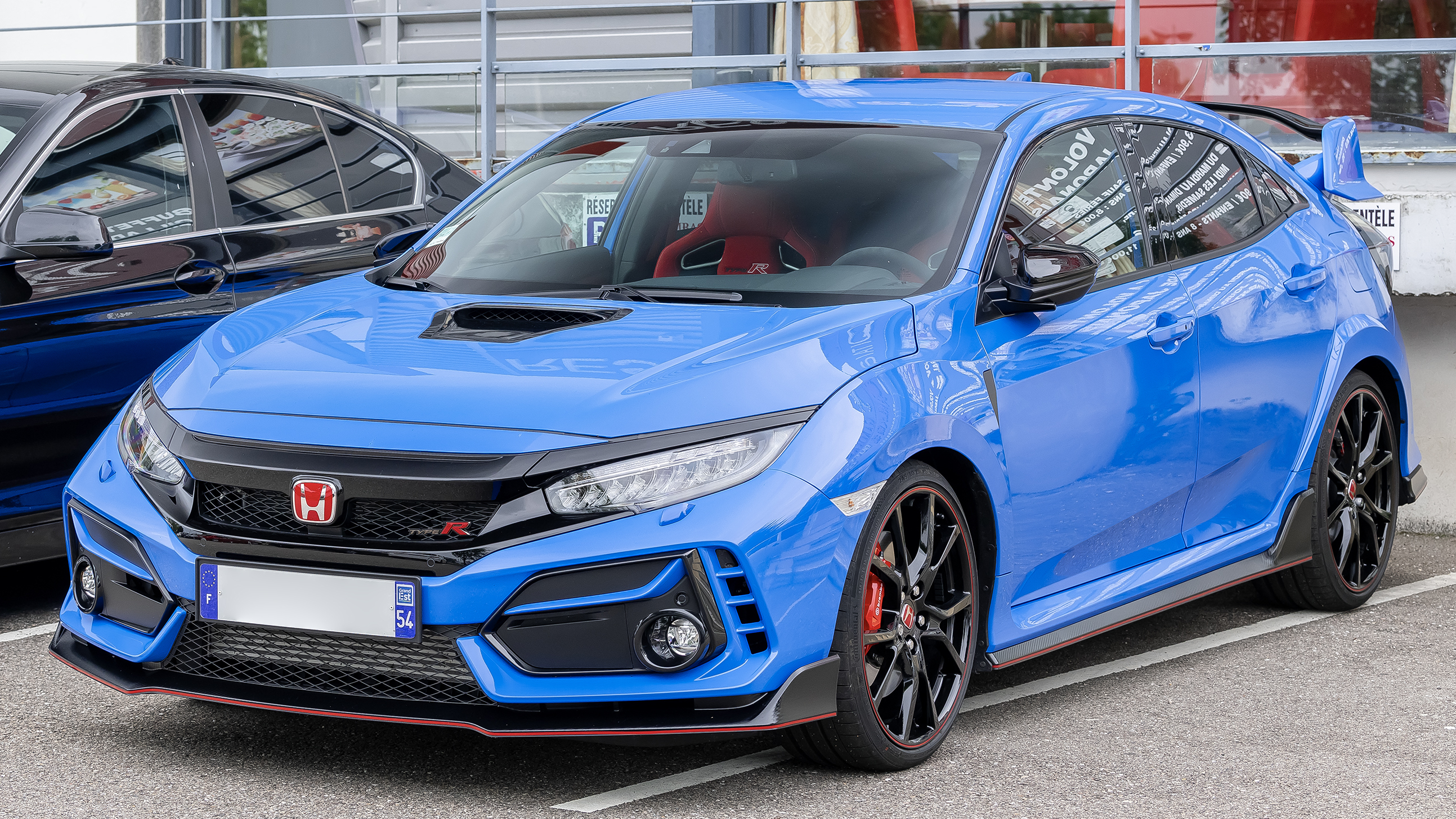
Honda Civic Type R (FK8) (2017–2021)

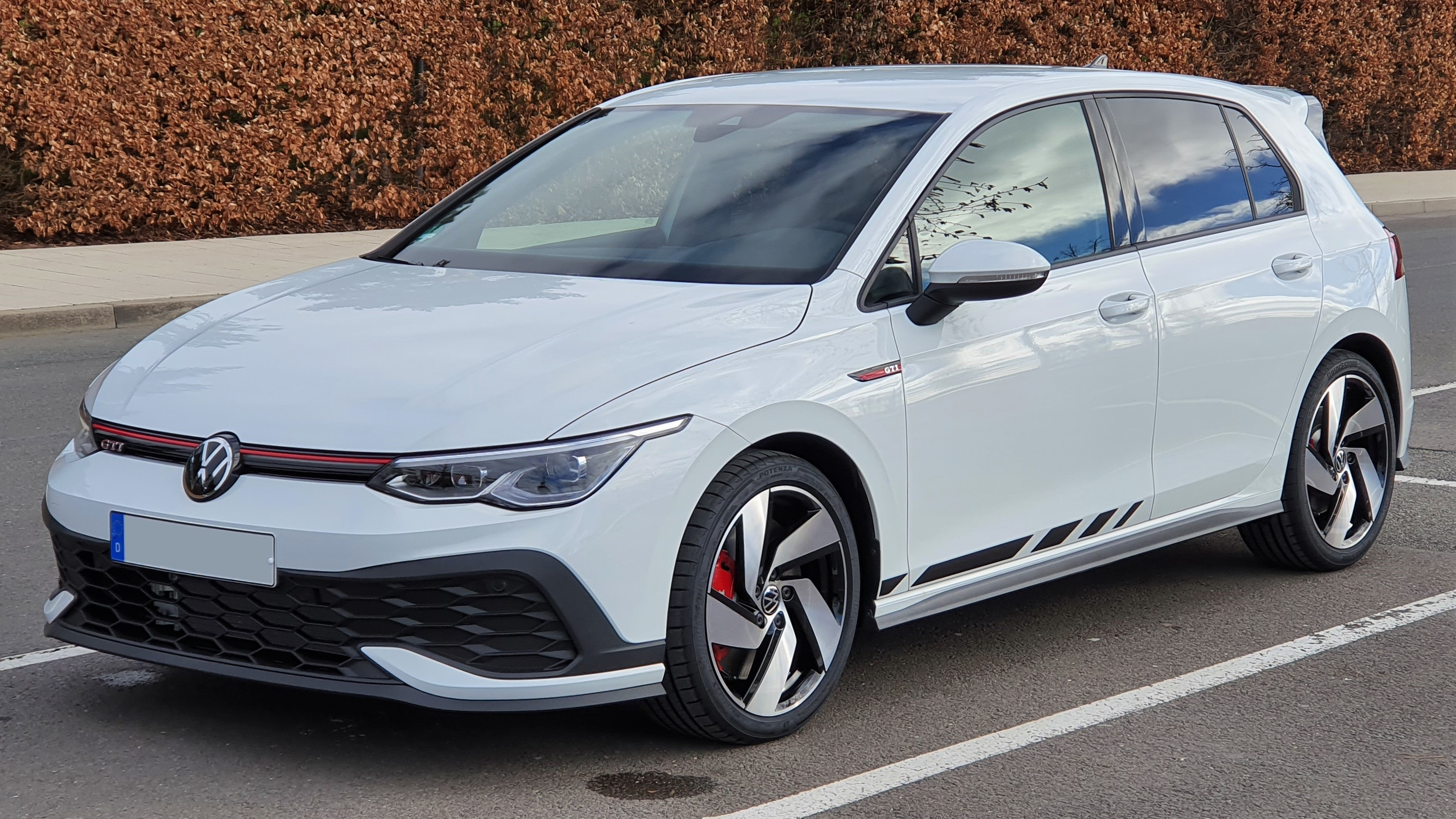
Volkswagen Golf GTI Clubsport (Mk8) (2021–present)

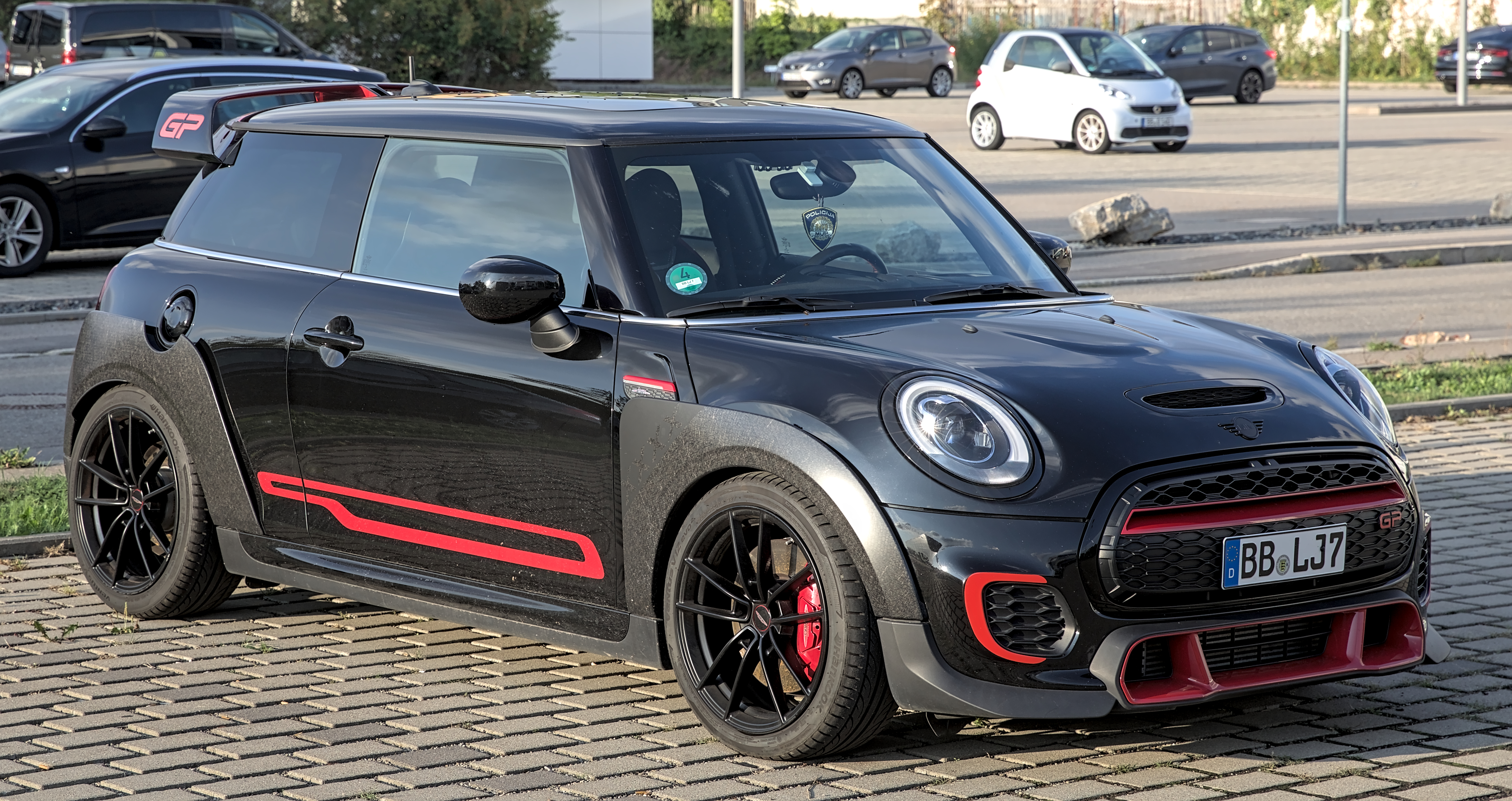
Mini Cooper (F56) JCW (2013–2023)

== Etymology ==
Usage of the term "hot hatchback" began in the United Kingdom in 1983, which was shortened to "hot hatch" in 1984. The term first appeared in The Times in 1985, and is now commonly and widely accepted as a mainstream, albeit informal, term. It is retrospectively applied to cars from the late 1970s but was not a phrase used at the time. While hot hatches generally come with two-box designs, three-box/sloped liftback designs are not unheard of, with some of them crossing into sports sedan territory.

Since the 1990s and 2000s, the term warm hatch has been used to describe sporting hatchback models that are slower than a hot hatch (i.e. a "junior" version of a hot hatch). Examples include the Mini Cooper (which sits below the Mini Cooper S), Peugeot 207 GT (which sits below the Peugeot 207 GTi) Suzuki Swift Sport, and Toyota Yaris SR.

== History ==
=== 1960s and 1970s ===
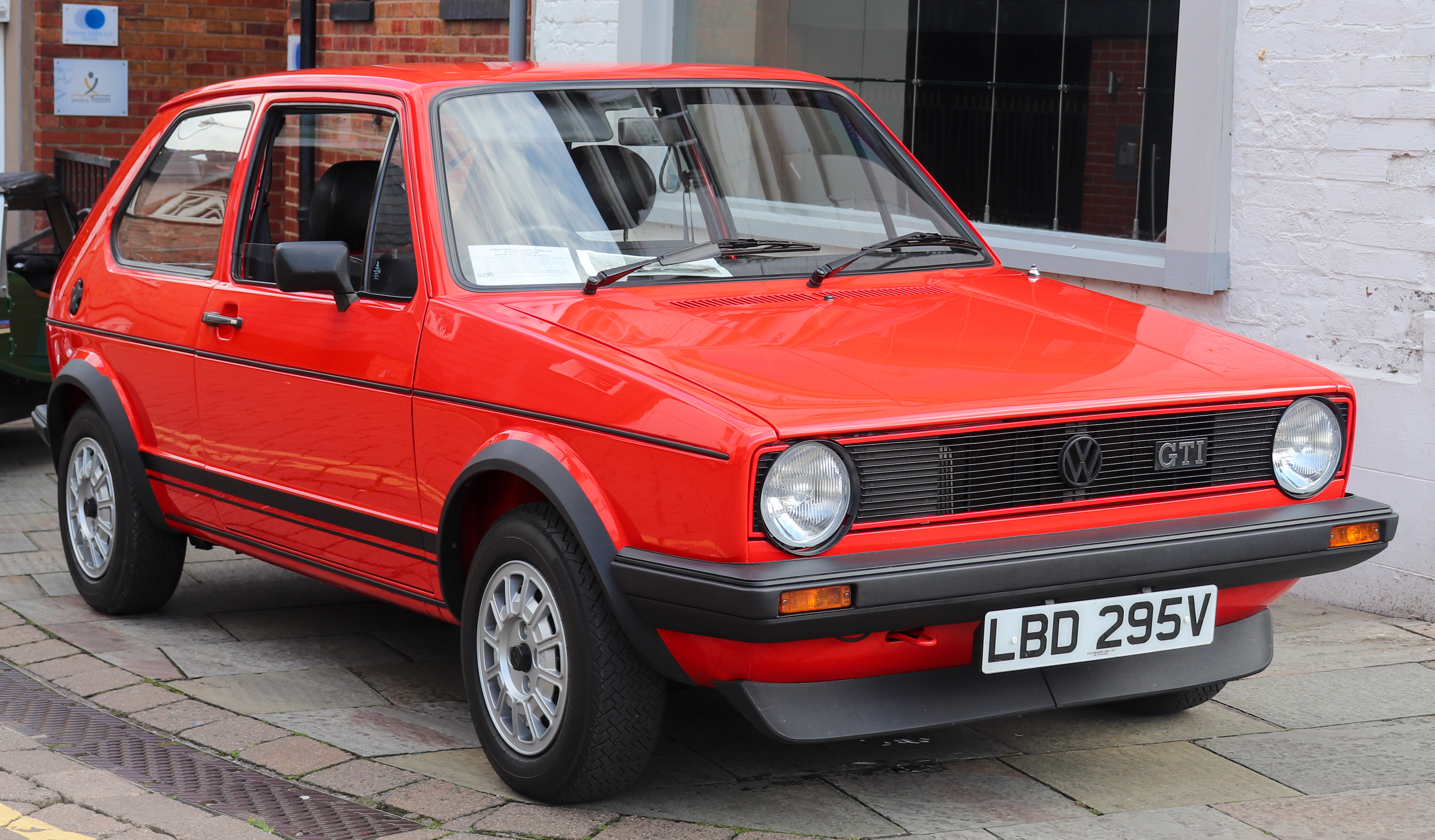
1979 Volkswagen Golf GTI (Mk1)

The 1961 Mini Cooper was one of the first performance cars to use a small body and an FF layout, both key characteristics of a hot hatchback. However, the Mini was not produced in a hatchback body style until 2001 and is therefore not considered a hot hatch.

The first car to meet the criteria of a hot hatch, the AMC Gremlin, was introduced in the United States on April 1, 1970. Promoted as "America's first subcompact", it came standard with a 3.3 L straight-six engine with an optional 3.8 L upgrade. By the 1972 model year it was available with a 5 L V-8 engine. The manufacturer described the Gremlin as "a pal to its friends and an ogre to its enemies," emphasizing its performance and radical design in comparison to other cars in its class. Compared to the Volkswagen Beetle, it was two inches longer, achieved comparable fuel economy, and sold for $1 less in the eastern US, though its base engine delivered 128 horsepower, more than twice that of the German subcompact.

The first European hot hatch was the Autobianchi A112 Abarth, introduced in September 1971. It was prepared by the motorsports division of the Fiat Group, at first with a 982 cc engine, obtained by increasing the stroke, coupled to a sporting exhaust, a twin-choke carburetor, and a different camshaft.

In 1973, the Simca 1100 Ti was launched. It had its power increased by 40% to 82 hp (61 kW), which resulted in a 0 to 60 mph (97 km/h) time of under 12 seconds and a top speed of 105 mph (169 km/h). Other upgrades included front disc brakes, front and rear spoilers and alloy wheels. The Alfa Romeo Alfasud Ti was launched in the same year. Along with a 5-speed gearbox, it featured a more powerful version of the standard 1.2 litre engine, brought to 68 PS (50 kW; 67 hp) by adopting a Weber twin-choke carburettor, allowing the small saloon to reach 160 km/h (99 mph).

The Renault 5 Alpine (called Gordini in the United Kingdom), which went on sale in May 1976. It had a top speed of 110 mph (177 km/h) and could accelerate from 0 to 60 mph in under 10 seconds.

The car credited with establishing the popularity of hot hatches is the Volkswagen Golf GTI, which was announced at the 1975 Frankfurt Motor Show. and released in July 1976. The Golf GTI was originally designated to be sold only in West Germany, but from 1977 Volkswagen began exports of the (left-hand drive only) GTI. Production of right-hand drive GTI's began in 1979.

The Renault 5 Alpine and Volkswagen Golf GTI, with the addition of a more powerful engine, sharper handling, distinctive body styling with additional spoilers and alloy wheels, helped create the birth of a huge market for small, practical hatchback cars with performance to match contemporary coupes such as the Ford Capri 2.0, Lancia Beta Coupe 2000 and Renault 17 TS. With top speeds above 110 mph (177 km/h), the Alpine and GTI enjoyed a short run of unparalleled sales success until the early 1980s.

There were two hot hatches created specifically for competition. In 1978, Vauxhall created the Chevette HS and HSR by fitting the 2.3 litre slant-four engine, using a 16-valve cylinder head. Fitted with two Stromberg carburettors the engine developed 135 bhp (the HSR developed 150 bhp). In 1979, Chrysler developed the Lotus Sunbeam which used the Lotus 1973 cc 16V slant four engine. Power output of 150 bhp (112 kW) and a 0-60 mph time of 6.6 seconds. Despite being rear-wheel drive, the Sunbeam is considered a hot hatch.

=== 1980s ===
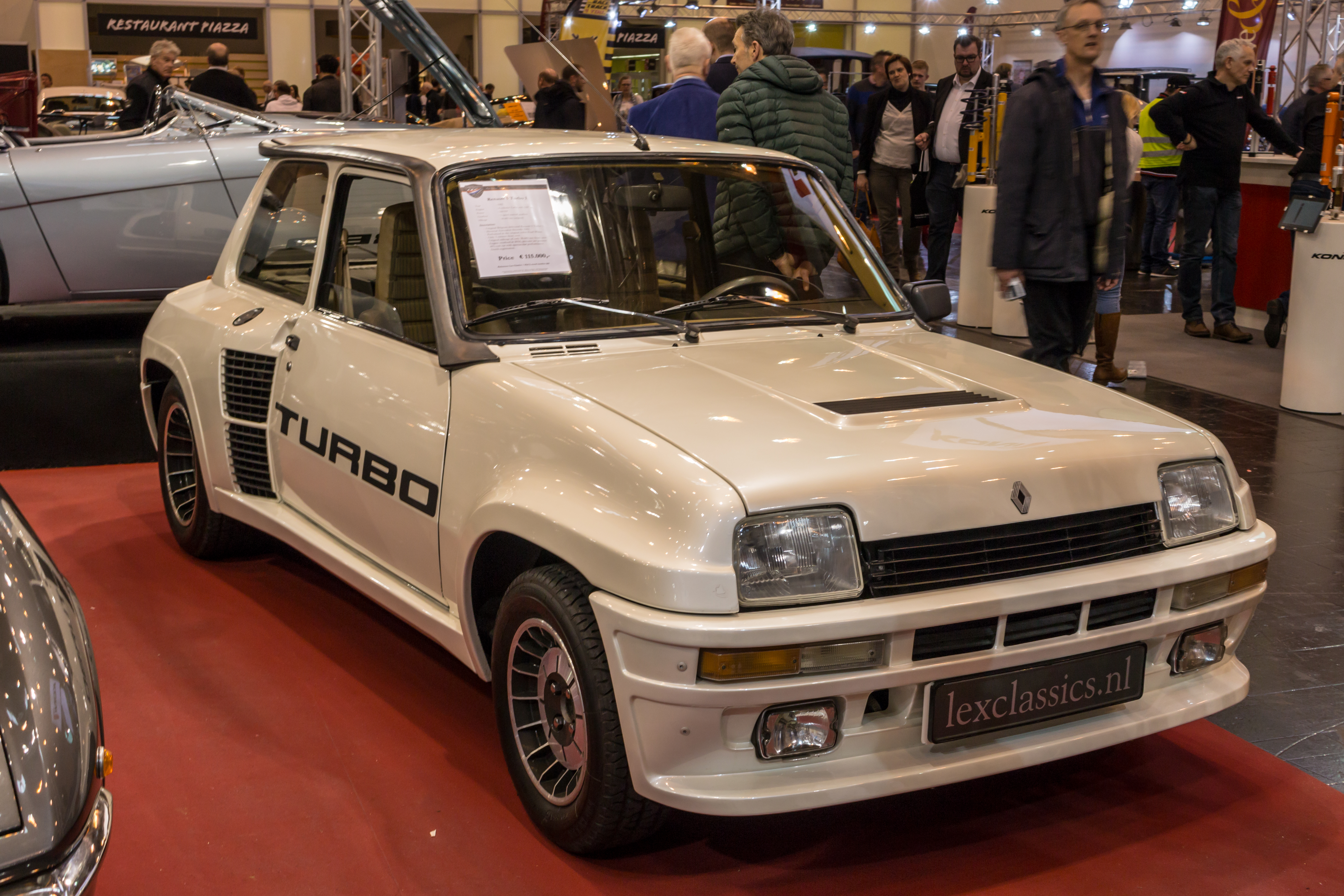
1982 Renault 5 Turbo

Until the early 1980s, the Volkswagen Golf Mk1 GTI and the Renault 5 Alpine/Gordini dominated the retrospectively named hot hatch market segment in many European markets.

From around 1984, the market for hatchbacks with sportier performance grew, and many manufacturers added a hot hatch variant to their range. Power increases were achieved through upgraded carburettors (e.g. the Ford Fiesta XR2), fuel injection (e.g. the Peugeot 205 GTI), turbocharging (e.g. the Renault 5 GT Turbo), supercharging (e.g. the Polo G40) or fitting larger engines (e.g. the 2.0 litre Fiat Ritmo/Strada Abarth 130 TC). Other significant hot hatches of the 1980s include the Ford Escort RS Turbo, Opel Kadett GTE (also known as Vauxhall Astra GTE), Renault 11 Turbo, Lancia Delta HF Integrale (all-wheel drive), Citroën AX GT and Suzuki Swift GTi.

By the end of the 1980s, the hot hatch was hugely popular in Europe, and was pushing into other worldwide markets. The brief heyday of Group B rallying pushed the hot hatch genre to its limits, and small numbers of ultra-high performance variants were manufactured to comply with the rally rules (often termed "homologation specials"). These vehicles represented a brief, extreme branch of the hot hatch, and included such notable vehicles as the Lancia Delta S4, MG Metro 6R4 and Peugeot 205 T16.

=== 1990s ===
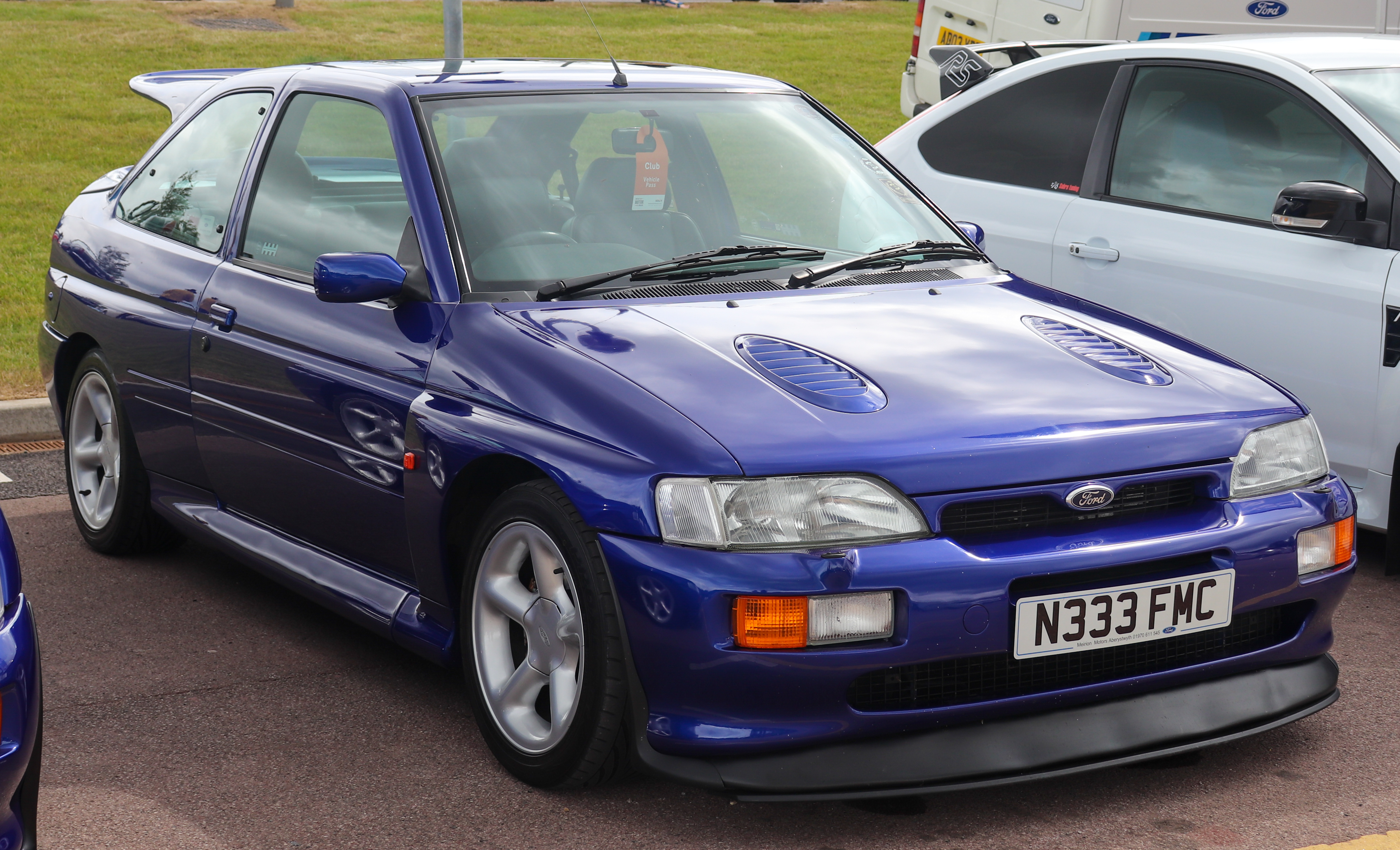
1992–1996 Ford Escort RS Cosworth

European manufacturers continued to produce hot hatches through the 1990s, including the Ford Fiesta RS Turbo, Ford Escort RS Cosworth, Peugeot 106 Rallye / GTi, Peugeot 306 GTi-6 / Rallye, Renault Clio Williams, SEAT Ibiza GTi / GT 16v / Cupra, Volkswagen Golf GTI / VR6 and Ford Focus ST170.

Japanese manufacturers also began to produce hot hatches, including the Honda Civic Type R, Mazda 323 GT-R, Nissan Pulsar GTI-R, Suzuki Swift GTi and Toyota Corolla GTi.

=== 2000s ===
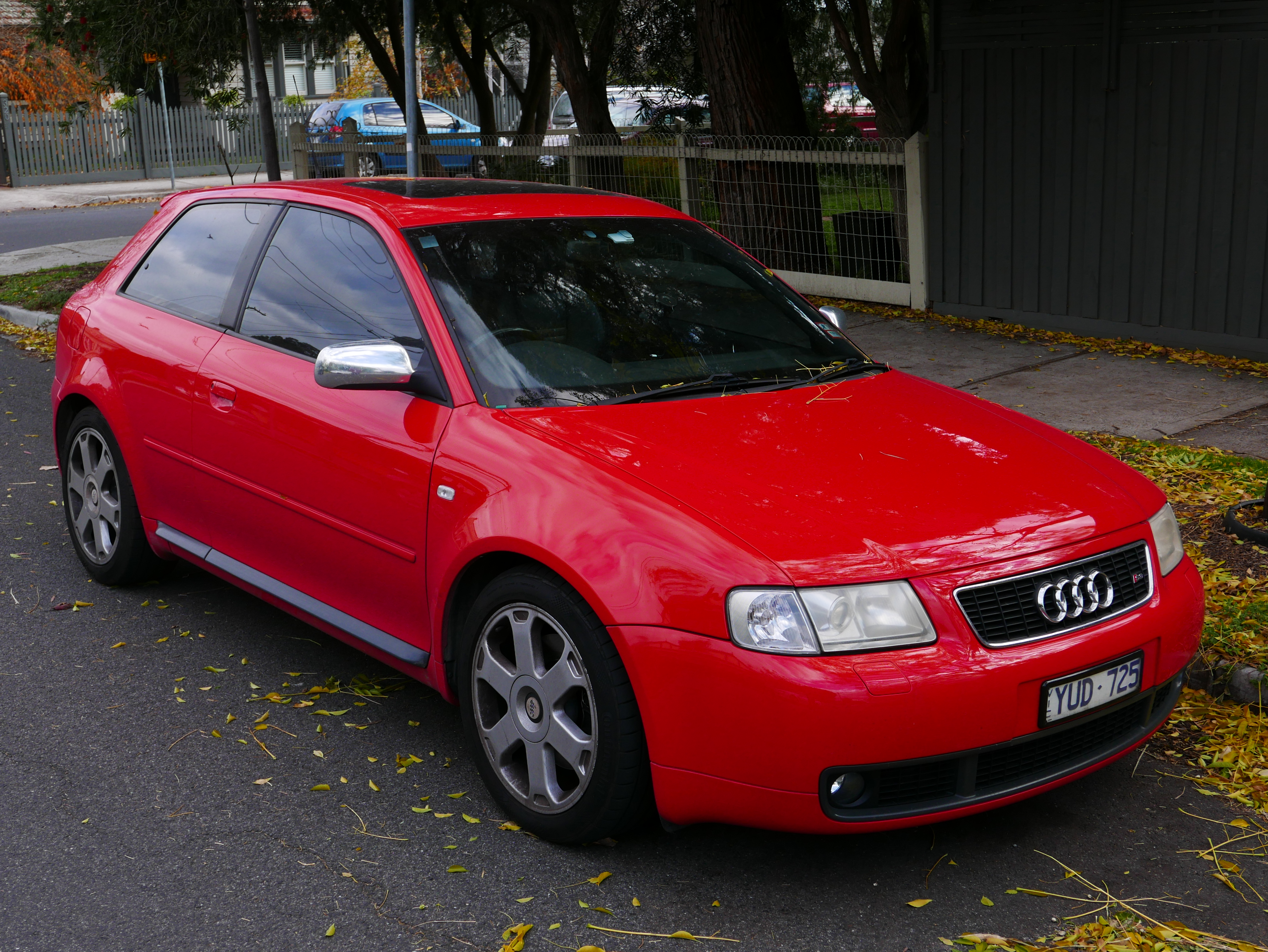
2000 Audi S3 (8L)

Hot hatches continued to get faster through the 2000s, with an increasing number of models using turbocharged engines. During the 2000s manufacturers started to emphasise the sub-brand of their hot hatch derivatives such as Renault's Renault Sport, Opel's OPC, Vauxhall's VXR and Fiat's Abarth.

European-built hot hatches from the 2000s include the Abarth Grande Punto, Alfa Romeo 147 GTA, Audi S3, Ford Fiesta ST, Ford Focus ST/RS, MG ZR, Mini Cooper S/JCW, Opel/Vauxhall Astra SRi Turbo/OPC/VXR, Peugeot 206 RC/207 GTi, Renault Clio RS/Mégane RS, SEAT León Cupra/FR+SEAT Ibiza Cupra/FR and Volkswagen Golf GTI/Golf R. Asian-built hot hatches included the Honda Civic Type R,Mazdaspeed 3, and Proton Satria GTi.

=== 2010s ===
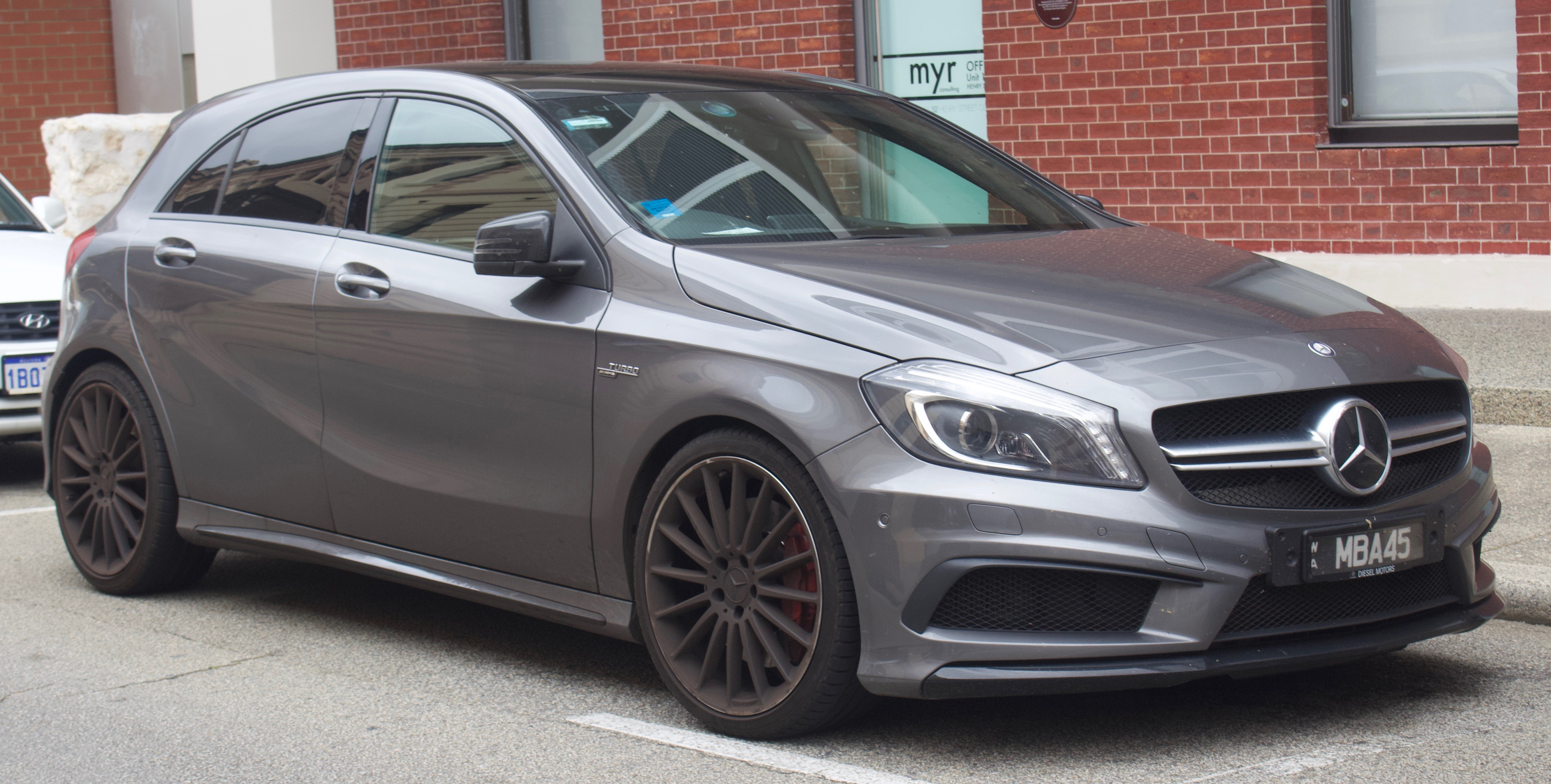
2012–2014 Mercedes-Benz A 45 AMG (W176)

Although all-wheel drive system has been made available for hot hatches since the 1980s, further increases to power outputs saw more adoption of the drivetrain on several hot hatches in the 2010s, such as the 2010 Volkswagen Golf R, 2011 Audi RS 3, 2013 Mercedes-Benz A 45 AMG, and the 2015 Ford Focus RS. With these models expanding the definition of hot hatches from front-wheel drive to also include all-wheel drive, the hatchback versions of the Subaru Impreza WRX/STI that have been produced at various times could be considered to be hot hatches. However, the WRX/STI is generally considered a compact saloon (to rival the Mitsubishi Lancer Evolution), rather than a hot hatch.

The majority of hot hatches continued with the traditional front-wheel drive layout, with many models producing in excess of 201 kW (270 bhp) and the Ford Focus RS 500 producing 257 kW (345 bhp). The BMW M135i/M140i is a rare example of a rear-wheel drive hot hatch from the 2010s.

Another technical development for hot hatches since 2010 is the increasing use of dual-clutch transmissions.

The W177 Mercedes-AMG A 45 S, which was introduced in 2019, is the first mass-produced hot hatch that exceeded the 298 kW (400 bhp) border, with its M139 engine producing 310 kW (416 bhp).

== Asia ==
Japanese-built hot hatches include the 1982 Honda City Turbo, 1984 Isuzu Piazza XS Turbo, 1986 Suzuki Cultus GTi, 1988 Nissan March Super Turbo, 1988 Toyota Corolla GTi (AE92), 1989 Daihatsu Charade GTti, 1990 Toyota Starlet GT Turbo, 1992 Mazda 323 GT-R, 1992 Mitsubishi Mirage Cyborg R, 1994 Nissan Pulsar GTI-R, 1995 Nissan Pulsar VZ-R N1, 1996 Toyota Starlet Glanza, 1997 Honda Civic Type R, 1999 Toyota Yaris TS, 2004 Toyota Corolla TS, 2005 Suzuki Swift Sport, 2006 Mitsubishi Colt Ralliart Version-R, 2007 Mazdaspeed3, 2008 Subaru Impreza WRX STI hatchback, 2020 Toyota GR Yaris.

South Korean manufacturers began to produce hot hatches in 2013 with the Kia Pro_Cee'd GT. Hyundai's first hot hatch, the i30 N, was released in 2017 and was awarded Best Hot Hatch at the 2018 UK Car of the Year Awards. The Veloster N was released in 2019 and was awarded the 2020 Performance Car of the Year by Road and Track Magazine.

Malaysian manufacturer Proton produced the Proton Satria R3 and the Satria Neo R3 which is the second-generation model.

== North America ==
In the 1980s, hot hatches built by Ford in the United States include the 1983 Escort GT (and its twin the Mercury Lynx XR3), Chrysler hot hatches include the 1984 Dodge Omni GLH ("Goes Like Hell") and the 1986 Shelby GLHS ("Goes Like Hell S'more"). General Motors produced the 1986 Chevrolet Cavalier Z24, 1986 Pontiac Sunbird GT and 1987 Buick Skyhawk Sport Hatch with rear hatches, however these are hatchback coupes, rather than traditional utilitarian hatchbacks.

More recent North American hot hatches include the 2002 Ford Focus SVT, 2008 Dodge Caliber SRT-4, and 2016 Ford Focus RS.

Ford stopped production of the Fiesta and Focus models in 2018, which also ended the production of the ST and RS models and left American automakers with no hot hatch offerings.

== Records ==
=== Acceleration ===
The fastest accelerating petrol hot hatch is the Audi RS 3 at 3.8 seconds to 62 mph while the fastest electric hot hatch is the Hyundai Ioniq 5 N at 3.4 seconds.

=== Top speed ===
The record top speed on a hot hatch is held by the Honda Civic Type R at 171 mph.

=== Most aerodynamic ===
The most aerodynamic hot hatchback is the Mercedes A-Class AMG with a drag coefficient of 0.25.

== See also ==
- Car classification
- Car body styles
- Sport compact
- Sports sedan
