= Sauteria spongiosa =

Conservation status
- Least Concern (IUCN 2.3)

Scientific classification
- Kingdom: Plantae
- Division: Marchantiophyta
- Class: Marchantiopsida
- Order: Marchantiales
- Family: Cleveaceae
- Genus: Sauteria
- Species: S. spongiosa

Binomial name
- Sauteria spongiosa (Kashyap) S.Hatt

Species of liverwort

Sauteria spongiosa is a species of liverwort in the Cleveaceae family. It is endemic to India.
