= Steinmetz Opel Tuning =

Company

Steinmetz GmbH
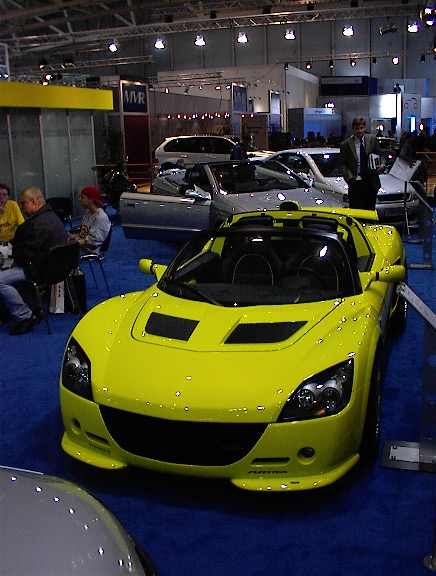
- Company type: GmbH
- Industry: Automotive
- Founded: 1993
- Founder: Klaus Steinmetz
- Headquarters: Aachen, Germany
- Key people: Rainer Vogel (CEO)
- Products: Automobiles
- Parent: Kohl automobile Vertriebs GmbH
- Website: www.steinmetz.de (English)

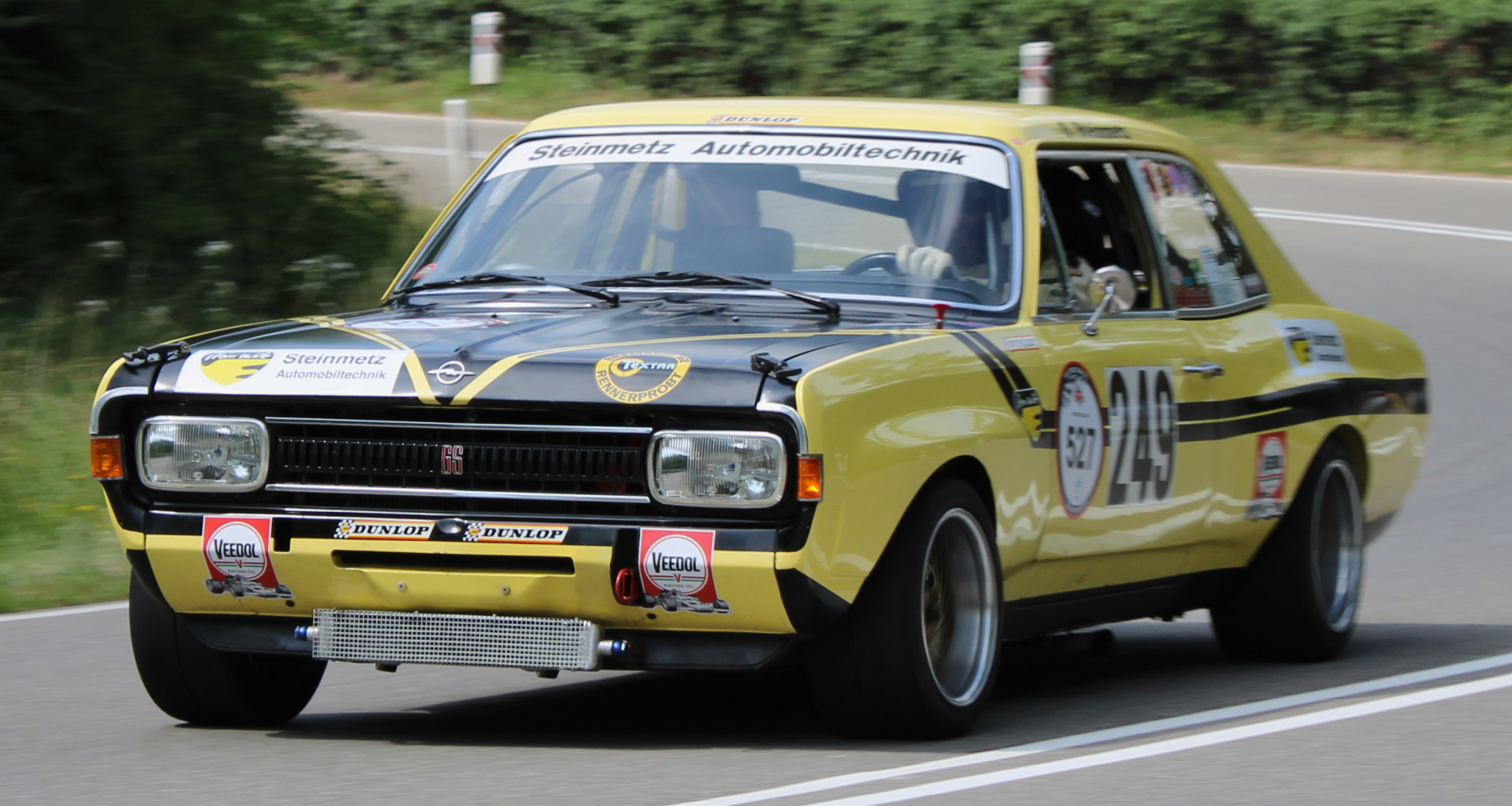
A 1970 Steinmetz Commodore A 3000 GS Motorsport Group II

Steinmetz Opel-Tuning is an automobile tuning company specializing in Opel cars, based in Aachen, Germany. They develop higher performance engines, sports suspension, special exhausts and complete aerodynamic bodystyling kits. Their engineers believe that the proving ground for all products is still in motorsport.

== See also ==
- Irmscher
- OPC

== Bibliography ==
- Klaus Steinmetz - Ein Leben für den Motorsport, Klaus Steinmetz, Oliver Steinmetz, Heel Verlag (2007), ISBN 3-898-80829-7 (German)
- Opel GT Motorsport 1968-1975, Stefan Müller, Detlef Kurzrock, Maurice Van Sevecotte, Petrolpics Verlag (2008), ISBN 978-3-940306-04-3 (German)
