= Proton Satria R3 =

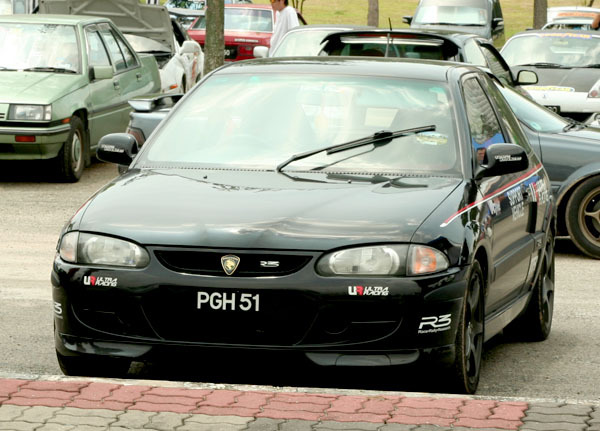

Overview
- Manufacturer: Proton
- Production: 2004–2005

Body and chassis
- Class: Hot hatch / Sport compact
- Body style: 3-door hatchback
- Layout: Front-engine, front-wheel drive
- Related: Mitsubishi Mirage / Proton Satria

Powertrain
- Engine: 1.8 L 4G93 I4
- Transmission: 5-speed manual

The Proton Satria R3 is a 3-door hot hatchback introduced in late 2004 by Malaysian automaker Proton. It was conceived as a run-out model of the successful Satria GTi, and was positioned at the top of the Satria range.

The Proton Satria R3 project began as an internal initiative by Proton’s Race, Rally, Research (R3) division to create a more performance-oriented version of the Satria GTi. Proton had been actively involved in motorsports, particularly in endurance racing and rallying, and wanted to apply its racing expertise to a road-going car.

The plans for the car were spearheaded by Dato’ Tengku Djan Ley, who was the head of Proton’s R3 division at the time. Tengku Djan was a key figure in Proton’s motorsports development and wanted to create a lighter, more driver-focused version of the Satria GTi.

The idea behind the Satria R3 was to build a lighter, sharper, and more track-focused version of the GTi, without significantly increasing power. Instead, the team at R3 focused on weight reduction, improved chassis tuning, better suspension, and a close-ratio gearbox to enhance the car’s driving dynamics. The project resulted in a limited production run of 150 units, each assembled by hand at Proton’s R3 facility.

== Second generation ==
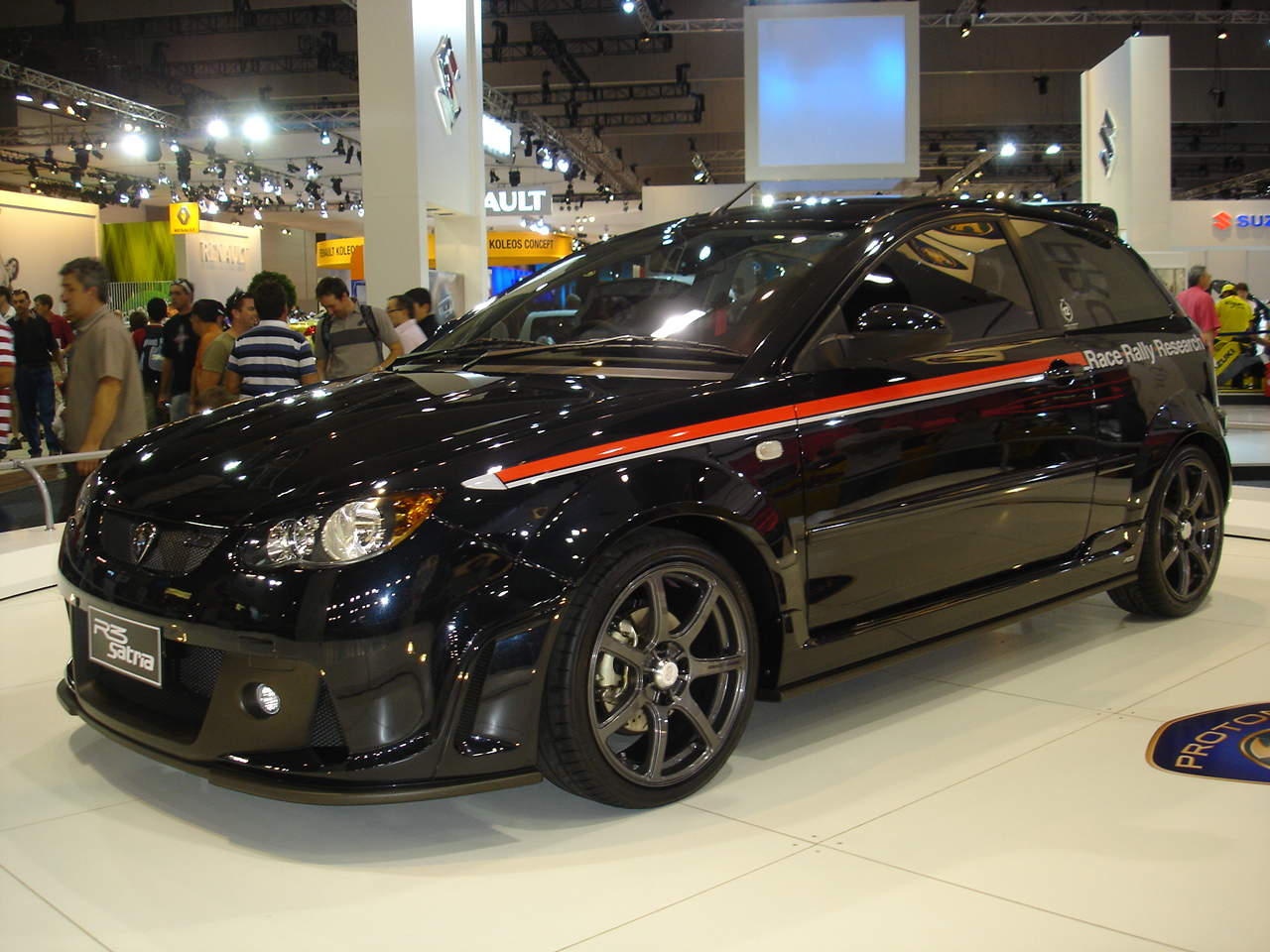
Proton Satria Neo R3, the second generation.

As a successor to the original Satria R3, Proton introduced a high performance version of the Satria Neo in 2008. It features a naturally aspired 1.6-liter engine producing 100 kW or 135 bhp, which Proton says will deliver a "controlled yet exciting driving experience". Other upgrades include a sportier bodykit, 16-inch wheels. , a lowered suspension setup derived from Lotus, an improved braking system, Recaro lightweight seats and a MOMO steering wheel. All of the 50 examples produced come in Incognito Black with a unique "Race, Rally Research" decal on the side.

=== Proton Satria Neo R3 Lotus Racing ===
The 25 unit-only Satria Neo R3 Lotus Racing on 30 March 2010. Sold at RM115k, this special version of Neo features some improvements over its sibling, Satria Neo CPS. The look similar to that Satria Neo R3, but some equipment is exclusive. The engine is R3-tuned with R3 Engine Management System, R3 Camshafts with adjustable alloy cams and R3 tuned exhaust system. R3 Division also used R3 Carbon Fibre Air Intake with K&N Air Filter System.

The engine now produces 145 bhp, approximately 13.8 percent more power than a normal CamPro CPS. with an improved torque of 168 Nm. Top speed notched reached 220 km/h figure and a century run is achieved in 9.2 seconds.

The gear ratios are also revised to match with the engine upgrade.

The chassis and handling are also improved with the use of Ohlins Adjustable coilovers. The wheels are 16-inch Advantis with Bridgestone Adrenalin tyres. The brakes are from AP Racing consisting of AP Racing calipers and pads.

Interior wise—the dash remains the same but it is now painted in greenish accent to match Lotus' green Trademark. Few enhancements are put in place such as the engine start button, dark green nappa leather and an alloy pedal set and gear knob.

=== Proton Satria Neo CPS R3 RS ===
To continue the legacy of the Satria Neo R3 Lotus Racing, Proton introduced the 2011 Proton Satria Neo CPS R3 RS with the price tag of RM79,797.00 are limited to 150 unit, much cheaper than its Lotus Racing sibling on 7 March 2011. Available only in bright red, the Satria Neo CPS R3 features a built-in 2-DIN navigation system, the first in Proton's history. Previously, several Proton models such as the Proton Persona and the Proton Exora did offer GPS navigation unit, but those units were portable stand-alone GPS units. The performance specifications of the 2011 Satria Neo CPS R3 remains the same as its Lotus Racing sibling.

Prior to its launch, the concept model for the 2011 Proton Satria Neo CPS R3 was debuted during the Tokyo Auto Salon 2011. Japanese auto part company CUSCO imports the 2011 Satria Neo CPS R3 and equips the Satria Neos with CUSCO performance parts before being resold to rally teams in Japan and Asia Pacific. In addition, CUSCO also forms their own team running on the Satria Neos to compete in the 2011 Asia-Pacific Rally Championship, making the team as the second team to use the Proton Satria Neo for the championship.

== Model information ==
The Satria R3, based on the original Satria (which itself is based on the Mitsubishi Mirage Cyborg), was introduced in late 2004. It was conceived as a run-out model of the successful Satria GTi, and was positioned at the top of the Satria range. Original Stage 1 R3s utilises the same Mitsubishi-sourced 1.8-litre, inline-4 engine as the Satria GTi (albeit with a new free-flow exhaust system), producing 140 bhp (105 kW) and 168 nm of torque. Power is channeled to the front wheels via a five-speed manual transmission, also sourced from the GTi.

The main modification that separated the R3 from the GTi was its double stitch welded chassis, which meant the car was welded twice for increased structural rigidity, aided by the inclusion of front and rear suspension strut braces. The R3 was also stripped of its sound-deadening material and driver's airbag, which helped bring the weight down to just 995 kg. Suspension improvements included uprated springs and dampers, thicker anti-roll bars and lower ride height.

The brakes were also modified to have anti-lock braking system removed as well as the original ventilated front discs and solid rear discs and replaced by cross-drilled and slotted DBA (Disc Brake Australia) discs all round. M1144 series brake pads were supplied by Mintex Racing.

Externally, the R3 is differentiated from the GTi by its lightweight 16-inch Advanti alloy wheels. Although they are the same size as those on the GTi, they have a five-spoke design with a gunmetal finish and wrapped in Yokohama Advan AD07 tyres. Also, the headlamps are smoked and the roof spoiler is now made of carbon fibre. Inside, the R3 has a three-spoke MOMO Tuner steering wheel, carbon fibre gearknob, titanium-effect trim and Recaro SR4 seats.

All R3s came in Incognito Black with R3's signature red and silver stripes on the sides, while the interiors of all cars were trimmed in black and red fabric. Only 150 units were ever produced.

Later, R3 introduced staged hop-ups for the Satria R3. The two stages (Stage 2 and 3) included a plethora of more hardcore upgrades for the powertrain and chassis.

The carbon fibre parts on the R3 are prone to theft. Many owners resorted to removing these lightweight parts and replacing them with those from the GTi, refitting them only during special events.

=== Second generation ===
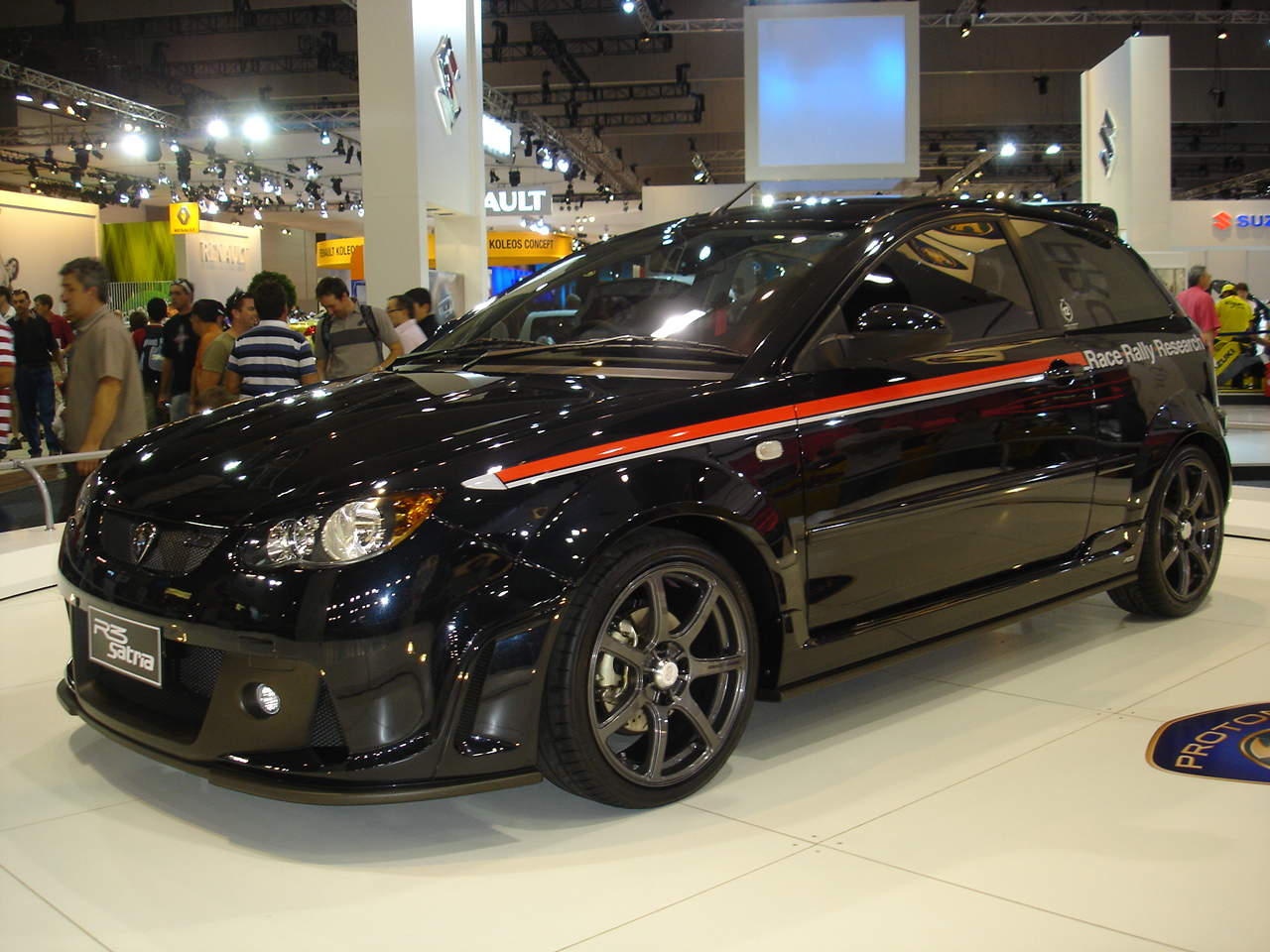
Proton Satria Neo R3, the second generation.

As a successor to the original Satria R3, Proton introduced a high performance version of the Satria Neo in 2008. It features a naturally aspired 1.6-liter engine producing 100 kW or 135 bhp, which Proton says will deliver a "controlled yet exciting driving experience". Other upgrades include a sportier bodykit, 16-inch wheels. , a lowered suspension setup derived from Lotus, an improved braking system, Recaro lightweight seats and a MOMO steering wheel. All of the 50 examples produced come in Incognito Black with a unique "Race, Rally Research" decal on the side.

==== Proton Satria Neo R3 Lotus Racing ====
The 25 unit-only Satria Neo R3 Lotus Racing on 30 March 2010. Sold at RM115k, this special version of Neo features some improvements over its sibling, Satria Neo CPS. The look similar to that Satria Neo R3, but some equipment is exclusive. The engine is R3-tuned with R3 Engine Management System, R3 Camshafts with adjustable alloy cams and R3 tuned exhaust system. R3 Division also used R3 Carbon Fibre Air Intake with K&N Air Filter System.

The engine now produces 145 bhp, approximately 13.8 percent more power than a normal CamPro CPS. with an improved torque of 168 Nm. Top speed notched reached 220 km/h figure and a century run is achieved in 9.2 seconds.

The gear ratios are also revised to match with the engine upgrade.

The chassis and handling are also improved with the use of Ohlins Adjustable coilovers. The wheels are 16-inch Advantis with Bridgestone Adrenalin tyres. The brakes are from AP Racing consisting of AP Racing calipers and pads.

Interior wise—the dash remains the same but it is now painted in greenish accent to match Lotus' green Trademark. Few enhancements are put in place such as the engine start button, dark green nappa leather and an alloy pedal set and gear knob.

==== Proton Satria Neo CPS R3 RS ====
To continue the legacy of the Satria Neo R3 Lotus Racing, Proton introduced the 2011 Proton Satria Neo CPS R3 RS with the price tag of RM79,797.00 are limited to 150 unit, much cheaper than its Lotus Racing sibling on 7 March 2011. Available only in bright red, the Satria Neo CPS R3 features a built-in 2-DIN navigation system, the first in Proton's history. Previously, several Proton models such as the Proton Persona and the Proton Exora did offer GPS navigation unit, but those units were portable stand-alone GPS units. The performance specifications of the 2011 Satria Neo CPS R3 remains the same as its Lotus Racing sibling.

Prior to its launch, the concept model for the 2011 Proton Satria Neo CPS R3 was debuted during the Tokyo Auto Salon 2011. Japanese auto part company CUSCO imports the 2011 Satria Neo CPS R3 and equips the Satria Neos with CUSCO performance parts before being resold to rally teams in Japan and Asia Pacific. In addition, CUSCO also forms their own team running on the Satria Neos to compete in the 2011 Asia-Pacific Rally Championship, making the team as the second team to use the Proton Satria Neo for the championship.

== Specifications ==
=== Suspension ===
- Front: Performance-tuned MacPherson struts, uprated coilsprings, revised static ride height and camber and 19mm anti-roll bar
- Rear: Multilink system with performance-tuned dampers, uprated coil springs and revised static ride height

=== Brakes ===
- Front: Disc Brakes
- Rear: Brake Shoes

=== Engine ===
- R3 Stage 2 Performance Camshafts
- R3 Stage 2 Performance Pulleys
- R3 Stage 2 Spark Plug Cables
- R3 Bumpsteer Kit
- R3 Stage 2 Engine Mounts
- R3 Stage 2 Front Splitter
- R3 Stage 3 4-1 Performance Header
- R3 Stage 2 Performance Bushes
- R3 Stage 3 Engine Upgrades

== Performance ==
Although the performance figures provided from R3 showed that the Satria R3 was actually slower than the Satria GTi (0–100 km/h in 9.6 seconds, 205 km/h top speed), Proton's original performance figures for the Satria GTI were optimistic.

- 0-100 km/h - 7.8 seconds
- Top speed - 220 km/h
