= 2025 Drexler-Automotive Formula Cup =

Motor racing competition

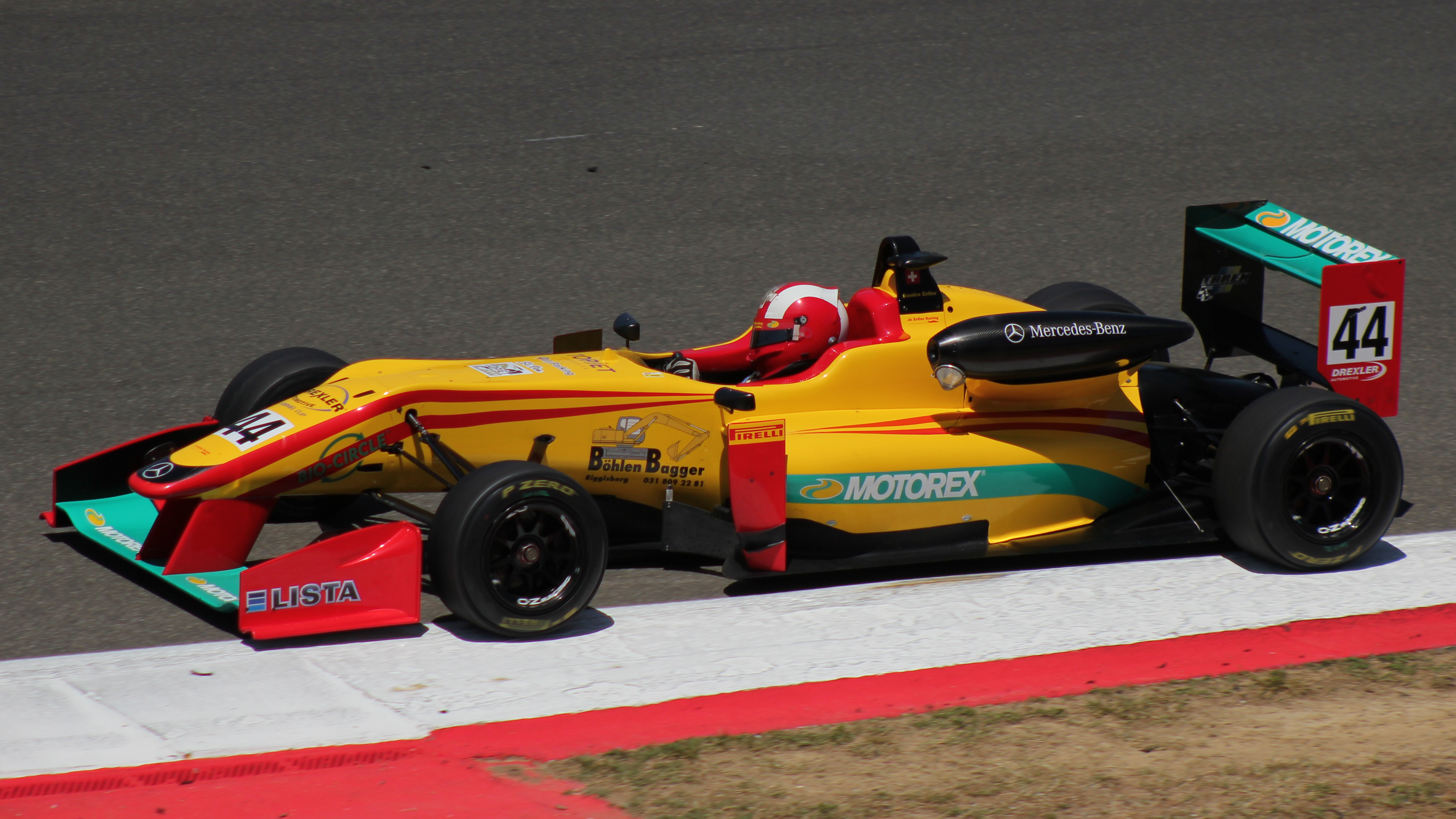
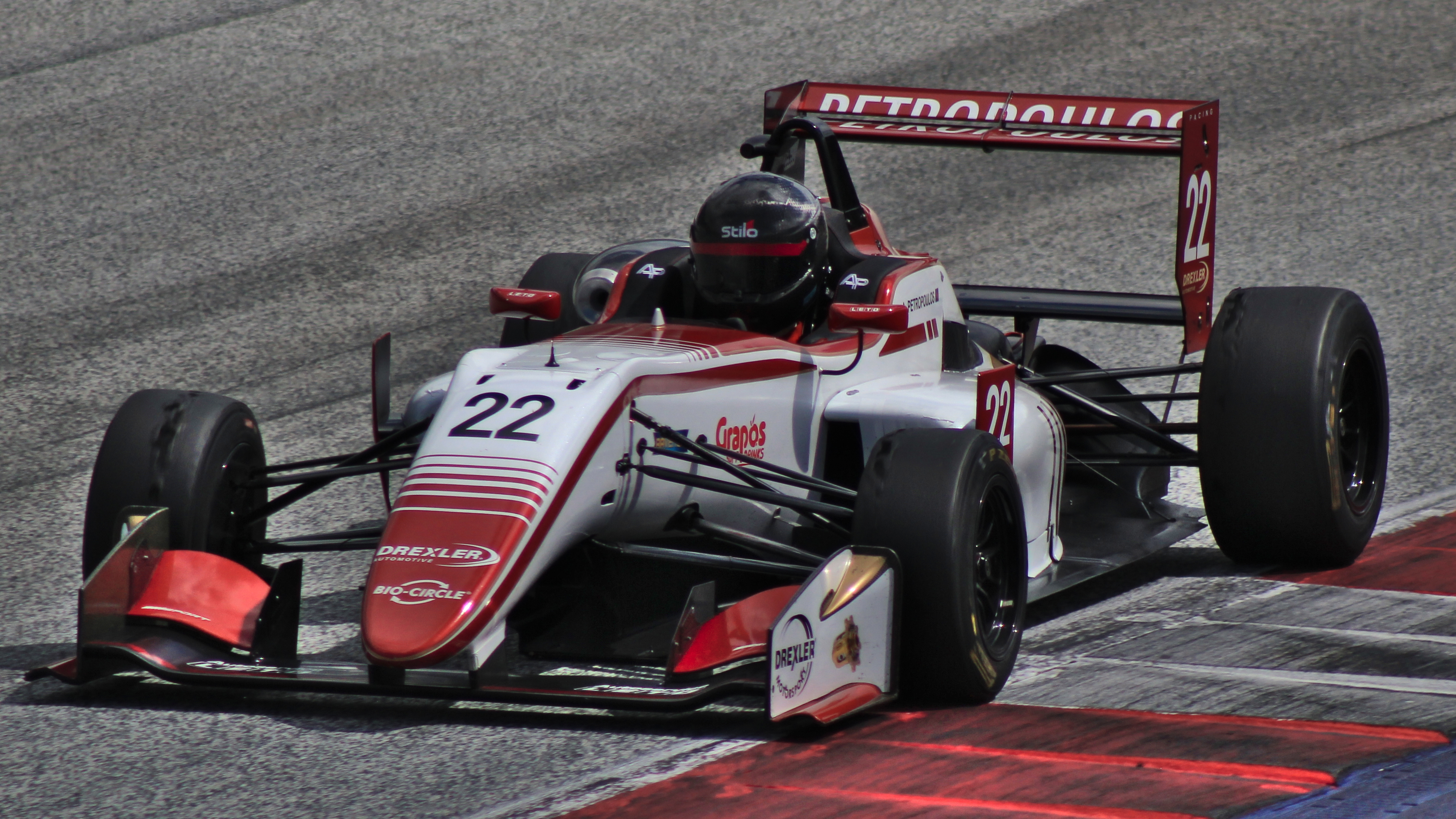
Jo Zeller Racing driver Sandro Zeller (top) won his eighth title in the highest class, the F3 Cup, while Team Hoffmann Racing's André Petropoulos (bottom) won the title in the F3 Trophy.

The 2025 Drexler-Automotive Formula Cup was the 44th Austria Formula 3 Cup season and the seventh season since Drexler-Automotive took over the title sponsoring of the series.

The 2025 season was held over seven race weekends across Europe. It began in April at Monza Circuit and concluded in October at Misano World Circuit. The championship continued its cooperation with the F2000 Italian Formula Trophy, with the two series sharing grids and race slots for multiple rounds.

Jo Zeller Racing's Sandro Zeller took his eighth title in the championship's highest class, the Formula 3 Cup. Team Hoffmann Racing's André Petropoulos was victorious in the Formula 3 Trophy, while STAC's Jérémy Clavaud became the inaugural Formula Regional Class winner and LRT's Michael Fischer claimed the Formula Light Cup title.

== Teams and drivers ==
The 2025 season saw the introduction of a Formula Regional Class, open for Tatuus F3 T-318 cars using Renault or Alfa Romeo engines. The other three classes remained the same: The Formula 3 Cup and Formula 3 Trophy classes divided the entered Formula 3 cars based on their age and power output, while the Formula Light Cup remained open for Formula Renault and Formula 4 cars.

=== Formula 3 Cup entries ===
Team	No.	Driver	Car	Engine	Rounds
(Austria) Franz Wöss Racing	1	(Hungary) Benjámin Berta	Dallara F320	Mercedes	1–3, 5–7
(Austria) Franz Wöss Racing	20	(Denmark) Stig Larsen	Dallara F320	Mercedes HWA	1–2, 5–7
(Austria) Franz Wöss Racing	21	(Germany) Ludwig Kronawitter	Dallara F320	Mercedes HWA	3, 5
(Austria) Franz Wöss Racing	21	(Switzerland) Christof Ledermann	Dallara F320		4
(Austria) Franz Wöss Racing	32	(Germany) Maximilian Malinowski	Dallara F316	Mercedes HWA	3
(Austria) Franz Wöss Racing	32	(Poland) Victor Smialek	Dallara F320		7
(Italy) Viola Formula Racing	2	(Italy) Laurence Balestrini	Dallara F317	Volkswagen	1–2
(Italy) Viola Formula Racing	14	(Italy) Andrea Benalli	Dallara F317	Mercedes HWA	1–2
(Italy) Puresport	14	(Italy) Andrea Benalli	Dallara F317	Mercedes HWA	5–7
(Italy) Puresport	8	(Italy) Dino Rasero	Dallara F320	Mercedes HWA	1–2, 5–7
(Switzerland) Jo Zeller Racing	11	(Switzerland) Kurt Böhlen	Dallara F316	Mercedes HWA	1, 5
(Switzerland) Jo Zeller Racing	44	(Switzerland) Sandro Zeller	Dallara F312	Mercedes HWA	All
(Italy) Perego Racing	46	(Italy) Riccardo Perego	Dallara F317	Volkswagen	1
(Italy) One Competition	70	(Italy) Enzo Stentella	Dallara F317	Volkswagen	1–2, 5–7
(Germany) Team Hoffmann Racing	98	(Czech Republic) Václav Šafář	Dallara F320	Volkswagen	5

=== Formula Regional entries ===
Team	No.	Driver	Car	Engine	Rounds
(France) Neri Autosport	10	(Italy) Luca Iannacone	Formula Regional	Renault	3–7
(Italy) Puresport	12	(Switzerland) Christof Ledermann	Formula Regional	Alfa Romeo	1–2, 5–6
(Italy) Puresport	16	(Italy) Sara Fruncillo	Formula Regional	Alfa Romeo	1
(Italy) Puresport	25	(Italy) Mattia Bagioni	Formula Regional	Alfa Romeo	1, 7
(France) Neri Autosport	30	(France) Sebastien Banchereau	Formula Regional	Renault	2, 6
(Italy) Alpha Team Racing	33	(Italy) Sandro de Virgilis	Formula Regional	Renault	1
(Italy) ASD Ruote Scoperte M.	38	(Italy) Andrea Masci	Formula Regional	Renault	1
(France) STAC	91	(France) Jérémy Clavaud	Formula Regional	Renault	1–2, 6

=== Formula 3 Trophy entries ===
Team	No.	Driver	Car	Engine	Rounds
(Switzerland) Jo Zeller Racing	3	(Switzerland) Marcel Tobler	Dallara F308	Mercedes	2–3, 5
(Switzerland) Jo Zeller Racing	4	(Switzerland) Urs Rüttimann	Dallara F306	Volkswagen	3–4
(Switzerland) Jo Zeller Racing	99	(United Kingdom) Lee Cunningham	Dallara F308	Mercedes HWA	1–3, 5–7
privateer	4	(Austria) Alexander Geier	Dallara F308		5
privateer	5	(Austria) Michael Aberer	Dallara F308		5, 7
privateer	15	(Austria) Roman Pöllinger	Dallara F300		4
privateer	90	(Italy) Antonio Marco Rinaldi	Dallara F393	Fiat FTP	6
(Italy) Facondini Racing	6	(Italy) Enrico Milani	Dallara F308	Fiat	5–7
(Italy) Facondini Racing	96	(Germany) Oliver Kratsch	Dallara F308	Toyota	1, 5–7
(Germany) Speed Center Team	7	(Germany) Christian Zeller	Dallara F305	Opel Spiess	3
(France) Neri Autosport	10	(Italy) Luca Iannacone	Dallara F311		2
(Italy) Twister Corse	13	(Italy) Sergio Terrini	Dallara F308	Fiat FTP	6
(Italy) ASD Living KC	21	(Italy) Umberto Vaglio	Dallara F308	Fiat FTP	1, 6–7
(Germany) Team Hoffmann Racing	22	(Germany) André Petropoulos	Dallara F316	Opel Spiess	2–3, 5–7
(Germany) Team Hoffmann Racing	98	(Czech Republic) Václav Šafář	Dallara F312	Toyota	6
(Italy) Bellspeed	27	(Italy) Patrick Bellezza	Dallara F300		7
(Italy) One Competition	28	(Italy) Federico Porri	Dallara F308		7
(France) Sud Motorsport	33	(Italy) Giuseppe Marinaro	Dallara F310	Fiat FTP	6
(Italy) ASD Autodromos - Nannini Racing	42	(Italy) Davide Pedetti	Dallara F317	Toyota	1–2, 6–7
(Italy) ASD Autodromos - Nannini Racing	88	(Italy) Francesco Solfaroli	Dallara F317	Toyota	6–7
(Czech Republic) Chabr Motorsport	54	(Czech Republic) Tomáš Chabr	Dallara F308	Mugen Honda	5–7
(Italy) Team Perodi	92	(Italy) Romano Cataldo	Dallara F316	Toyota	1–2, 6
(Italy) Corbetta Racing	93	(Italy) Antonio Montruccoli	Dallara F312	Mercedes HWA	1
(Italy) Antonio Racing	777	(Italy) Antonio Pellegrino	Dallara F312	Toyota	6–7
(Austria) APE Racing	912	(Austria) Nikolay Takev	Dallara F308	Opel Spiess	4–5

=== Formula Light Cup entries ===
Team	No.	Driver	Car	Engine	Rounds
privateer	4	(Austria) Alexander Geier	Tatuus FR2.0	Renault	7
privateer	28	(Germany) Thomas Hoffmann	Tatuus FR2.0	Renault	3, 6
privateer	31	(France) Sarene Ziffel	Tatuus FR2.0	Renault	3–5, 7
(Italy) Speed Motor	7	(Italy) Karim Sartori	Tatuus FR2.0	Renault	1–2, 6–7
(Germany) Speed Center Team	8	(Germany) Dennis Hübl	Tatuus FR2.0	Renault	3
(Italy) Henry Morrogh Drivers School	9	(Italy) Giovanni Ciccarelli	Tatuus F4-T014	Abarth	6
(Italy) Henry Morrogh Drivers School	37	(Italy) Matteo Zoccali	Tatuus F4-T014	Abarth	6–7
(Italy) GTM Motorsport	18	(Italy) Domenico Terron	Tatuus FR2.0	Renault	1–2, 6
(Italy) Team Perodi	19	(Italy) Vincenzo Siciliano	Tatuus FR2.0	Renault	1–2
(Italy) G Motorsport	19	(Italy) Vito di Bello	Tatuus FR2.0	Renault	7
(Italy) Team Hars	22	(Italy) Luca Guolo	Tatuus FR2.0	Renault	6
(France) Neri Autosport	23	(France) Bruno Mottez	Tatuus FR2.0	Renault	2, 6–7
(France) Team Morel Auto Racing	24	(France) Tristan Morel	Tatuus FR2.0	Renault	2
(Italy) Viola Formula Racing	26	(Portugal) Luis Aguiar	Tatuus FR2.0	Renault	1–2
(Italy) Valdelsa Classic Motor Club	59	(Italy) Riccardo Rossi	Tatuus FR2.0	Renault	1, 7
(Italy) ASD Ruote Scoperte M.	79	(Italy) Fabio Turchetto	Tatuus FR2.0	Renault	1, 6–7
(Austria) LRT	81	(Austria) Michael Fischer	Tatuus FR2.0	Renault	3–7
(Austria) LRT	101	(Austria) Norbert Lenzenweger	Tatuus FR2.0	Renault	3
(Austria) LRT	127	(Austria) Jürgen Berger	Tatuus FR2.0	Renault	3
(Austria) LRT	143	(Austria) Dominic Makolm	Tatuus FR2.0	Renault	6
(Austria) LRT	175	(Austria) Alexander Fritz	Tatuus FR2.0	Renault	3–5
(Austria) LRT	303	(Austria) Markus Fischer	Tatuus FR2.0	Renault	5
(Austria) Franz Wöss Racing	95	(Germany) Nicolas Löffler	Tatuus FR2.0	Renault	All
(Austria) Franz Wöss Racing	125	(United States) Robert Siska	Tatuus FR2.0	Renault	2–3, 6
(Hungary) Kermor Motorsport	104	(Hungary) Adam Kovacs	Tatuus FR2.0	Renault	4
(Hungary) Kermor Motorsport	146	(Hungary) Vida Benedek	Tatuus FR2.0	Renault	7
(Hungary) Kermor Motorsport	168	(Hungary) Zeno Kovacs	Tatuus FR2.0	Renault	4, 7
(Germany) Team Hoffmann Racing	122	(Austria) Dr. Norbert Groer	Tatuus FR2.0	Renault	2–7
(Austria) MSC Rottenegg	133	(Austria) Marco Milani	Tatuus FR2.0	Renault	5
(Switzerland) Jo Zeller Racing	717	(Switzerland) Stephan Glaser	Tatuus FR2.0	Renault	1

== Race calendar ==
The 2025 calendar was announced on 9 January 2025. The series made its debut on two tracks, the Automotodróm Slovakia Ring and the Misano World Circuit Marco Simoncelli. Three tracks left the calendar in the Lausitzring, the Red Bull Ring and Vallelunga Circuit, meaning the series downsized from eight to seven rounds and did compete in Austria for the first time in its history, despite its original name being the Austrian Formula 3 Cup.

R.		Circuit	Date	Support bill	Map of circuit locations
1	SR	(Italy) Monza Circuit, Monza	12 April	Monza Historic; F2000 Italian Formula Trophy	2025 Drexler-Automotive Formula Cup is located in Europe
1	FR	(Italy) Monza Circuit, Monza	13 April	Monza Historic; F2000 Italian Formula Trophy	2025 Drexler-Automotive Formula Cup is located in Europe
2	SR	(Italy) Mugello Circuit, Scarperia e San Piero	10 May	ACI Historic Racing Weekend Mugello; F2000 Italian Formula Trophy	2025 Drexler-Automotive Formula Cup is located in Europe
2	FR	(Italy) Mugello Circuit, Scarperia e San Piero	11 May	ACI Historic Racing Weekend Mugello; F2000 Italian Formula Trophy	2025 Drexler-Automotive Formula Cup is located in Europe
3	SR	(Germany) Hockenheimring, Hockenheim	26 July	P9 Challenge; Formula Vee Festival	2025 Drexler-Automotive Formula Cup is located in Europe
3	FR	(Germany) Hockenheimring, Hockenheim	26 July	P9 Challenge; Formula Vee Festival	2025 Drexler-Automotive Formula Cup is located in Europe
4	SR	Automotodróm Slovakia Ring, Orechová Potôň	23 August	ESET Cup Series; Formula 4 CEZ Championship	2025 Drexler-Automotive Formula Cup is located in Europe
4	FR	Automotodróm Slovakia Ring, Orechová Potôň	24 August	ESET Cup Series; Formula 4 CEZ Championship	2025 Drexler-Automotive Formula Cup is located in Europe
5	SR	(Czech Republic) Brno Circuit, Brno	6 September	TCR Eastern Europe Trophy; Formula 4 CEZ Championship	2025 Drexler-Automotive Formula Cup is located in Europe
5	FR	(Czech Republic) Brno Circuit, Brno	7 September	TCR Eastern Europe Trophy; Formula 4 CEZ Championship	2025 Drexler-Automotive Formula Cup is located in Europe
6	SR	(Italy) Imola Circuit, Imola	27 September	Italian GT Championship; F2000 Italian Formula Trophy	2025 Drexler-Automotive Formula Cup is located in Europe
6	FR	(Italy) Imola Circuit, Imola	28 September	Italian GT Championship; F2000 Italian Formula Trophy	2025 Drexler-Automotive Formula Cup is located in Europe
7	SR	(Italy) Misano World Circuit Marco Simoncelli, Misano Adriatico	26 October	Campionato Italiano Auto Storiche; F2000 Italian Formula Trophy	2025 Drexler-Automotive Formula Cup is located in Europe
7	FR	(Italy) Misano World Circuit Marco Simoncelli, Misano Adriatico	26 October	Campionato Italiano Auto Storiche; F2000 Italian Formula Trophy	2025 Drexler-Automotive Formula Cup is located in Europe

== Season report ==
=== First half ===
The 2025 season commenced in April at Monza Circuit. In the primary F3 Cup class, Franz Wöss Racing's Benjámin Berta and Jo Zeller Racing's Sandro Zeller took a win and a second place apiece, with Berta taking an early lead in the standings as his win came in the higher-rewarding feature race. Wins in the F3 Trophy went to Jo Zeller Racing's Lee Cunningham and Facondini Racing's Oliver Kratsch, while STAC's Jérémy Clavaud became the championship's inaugural Formula Regional class winner before following that up with a second victory in race two. Viola Formula Racing driver Luis Aguiar meanwhile claimed two wins on his debut in the Formula Light Cup to also establish an early lead.

Mugello Circuit hosted round two, where the battle between Zeller and Berta continued. Berta won race one, before the pair collided in race two. That saw Viola Formula's Andrea Benalli inherit victory as Berta retired and Zeller finished fourth in class to take the championship lead despite incurring a 20-second penalty for the collision with Berta. All three other classes saw unchallenged double victories, with Clavaud and Aguiar doubling up on their round one performances to grow their win streaks in Formula Regional and Formula Light, while Nannini Racing's Davide Pedetti took victory ahead of Team Hoffmann Racing's André Petropoulos in both races in the F3 Trophy.

The field for all four classes shrunk for the series' third round at the Hockenheimring. The F3 Cup was dominated by Berta, who was fastest in both qualifying sessions before doubling up and leading Zeller in both races to reclaim the championship lead. Clavaud did not travel to Germany to try to sustain his Formula Regional win streak, leaving Neri Autosport's Luca Iannacone to take two wins as the sole competitor in class. Similarly, Aguiar was absent in the Formula Light Cup, leaving LRT's Michael Fischer to dominate the field with a double win. Wins in the F3 Trophy were shared between Jo Zeller Racing's Marcel Tobler and Petropoulos, with Cunningham taking the standings lead in class.

Round four saw the series debut at the Slovakia Ring, but only 13 cars entered across all classes. Berta crucially was not among them, handing Zeller the lead in the F3 Cup on a silver platter - only half points were awarded for both races, though, as only two cars entered the class. Iannacone and Fischer continued their win streaks in Formula Regional and Formula Light, with the former once again the only competitor in his class and the latter now level on points with early season dominator Aguiar. Only three cars entered the F3 Trophy class, where APE Racing's Nikolay Takev and Jo Zeller Racing's Urs Rüttimann took a win each as none of the drivers topping the standings entered the event.

=== Second half ===
Berta returned to the field for round five at Brno Circuit in dominant fashion: he swept the weekend by setting pole position in both qualifying sessions before winning both races overall and in class, leading Zeller, closing the gap to the Swiss in the F3 Cup standings once again. The F3 Trophy saw the return of frontrunners Petropoulos and Cunningham, with the pair taking a race win each to end the weekend level on points. The Formula Regional class finally saw some competition for Iannacone, with Puresport's Christof Ledermann winning both races on his return to the category, while Fischer notched up two more wins in Formula Light to build his streak up to six and take the lead in the class.

The penultimate round at Imola Circuit delivered the next twist in the F3 Cup title battle. Berta claimed pole position in qualifying, but Zeller beat him in both races to take two more victories and move closer to securing the title. The F3 Trophy saw a multi-car crash in the first race that eliminated Petropoulos, with Sud Motorsport's Giuseppe Marinaro taking the win, before the German bounced back with victory in race two to move back into the championship lead. Neri's Sebastien Banchereau won race one in Formula Regional, before Clavaud was back on top in race two as Fischer's Formula Light streak was broken by Speed Motor's Karim Sartori, but the Austrian still wrapped up the title.

Three of the four class championships were yet to be decided in the final round at Misano. The F3 Cup title was decided in anticlimactic fashion when Berta retired with a mechanical issue in the first race, handing victory and the title to Zeller. The same issues prevented Berta from taking part in the second race, which was won by his teammate Victor Smialek on his return to the series. With Ledermann and Clavaud both absent, Puresport's Mattia Bagioni won both races in Formula Regional, while Petropoulos took the title in the F3 Trophy by coming second twice behind Kratsch. Sartori meanwhile took both victories in the Formula Light Cup to cement his second place in the standings.

Championship veteran Zeller claimed his eighth series title after two years of finishing behind Berta, but the picture might have been different had Berta not skipped the round in Slovakia and had he not suffered mechanical problems in the final round. Both took six victories each, but with Berta retiring twice, Zeller had the advantage. Title battles in the other classes were all shaped by high entry fluctuation, with no driver in the F3 Trophy and none of the race winners in Formula Light competing for the whole season. The newly-introduced Formula Regional class lastly suffered from low entry numbers all season long, with the high point of six cars from the opening round never reached again afterwards.

== Race results ==
R.		Circuit	Pole position	Fastest lap	F3 Cup winner	Formula Regional winner	F3 Trophy winner	Formula Light Cup winner
1	SR	(Italy) Monza Circuit		(Hungary) Benjámin Berta	(Switzerland) Sandro Zeller	(France) Jérémy Clavaud	(United Kingdom) Lee Cunningham	(Portugal) Luis Aguiar
1	FR	(Italy) Monza Circuit	(Hungary) Benjámin Berta	(Hungary) Benjámin Berta	(Hungary) Benjámin Berta	(France) Jérémy Clavaud	(Germany) Oliver Kratsch	(Portugal) Luis Aguiar
2	SR	(Italy) Mugello Circuit		(Hungary) Benjámin Berta	(Hungary) Benjámin Berta	(France) Jérémy Clavaud	(Italy) Davide Pedetti	(Portugal) Luis Aguiar
2	FR	(Italy) Mugello Circuit	(Hungary) Benjámin Berta	(Switzerland) Sandro Zeller	(Italy) Andrea Benalli	(France) Jérémy Clavaud	(Italy) Davide Pedetti	(Portugal) Luis Aguiar
3	SR	(Germany) Hockenheimring	(Hungary) Benjámin Berta	(Hungary) Benjámin Berta	(Hungary) Benjámin Berta	(Italy) Luca Iannacone	(Switzerland) Marcel Tobler	(Austria) Michael Fischer
3	FR	(Germany) Hockenheimring	(Hungary) Benjámin Berta	(Hungary) Benjámin Berta	(Hungary) Benjámin Berta	(Italy) Luca Iannacone	(Germany) André Petropoulos	(Austria) Michael Fischer
4	SR	Automotodróm Slovakia Ring		(Switzerland) Sandro Zeller	(Switzerland) Sandro Zeller	(Italy) Luca Iannacone	(Austria) Nikolay Takev	(Austria) Michael Fischer
4	FR	Automotodróm Slovakia Ring	(Switzerland) Sandro Zeller	(Switzerland) Sandro Zeller	(Switzerland) Sandro Zeller	(Italy) Luca Iannacone	(Switzerland) Urs Rüttimann	(Austria) Michael Fischer
5	SR	(Czech Republic) Brno Circuit	(Hungary) Benjámin Berta	(Hungary) Benjámin Berta	(Hungary) Benjámin Berta	(Switzerland) Christof Ledermann	(United Kingdom) Lee Cunningham	(Austria) Michael Fischer
5	FR	(Czech Republic) Brno Circuit	(Hungary) Benjámin Berta	(Hungary) Benjámin Berta	(Hungary) Benjámin Berta	(Switzerland) Christof Ledermann	(Germany) André Petropoulos	(Austria) Michael Fischer
6	SR	(Italy) Imola Circuit		(Hungary) Benjámin Berta	(Switzerland) Sandro Zeller	(France) Sebastien Banchereau	(Italy) Giuseppe Marinaro	(Austria) Michael Fischer
6	FR	(Italy) Imola Circuit	(Hungary) Benjámin Berta	(Hungary) Benjámin Berta	(Switzerland) Sandro Zeller	(France) Jérémy Clavaud	(Germany) André Petropoulos	(Italy) Karim Sartori
7	SR	(Italy) Misano World Circuit Marco Simoncelli		(Poland) Victor Smialek	(Switzerland) Sandro Zeller	(Italy) Mattia Bagioni	(Germany) Oliver Kratsch	(Italy) Karim Sartori
7	FR	(Italy) Misano World Circuit Marco Simoncelli	(Poland) Victor Smialek	(Poland) Victor Smialek	(Poland) Victor Smialek	(Italy) Mattia Bagioni	(Germany) Oliver Kratsch	(Italy) Karim Sartori

== Standings ==
=== Scoring system ===
The scoring system was overhauled in 2025. The shorter, first race of each weekend was designated the Sprint Race, where classified drivers scored the following points:

Position	**1st**	**2nd**	**3rd**	**4th**	**5th**	**6th**	**7th**	**8th**	**9th**	**10th**
Points	20	15	12	10	8	6	4	3	2	1

The second race of each weekend, the longer Feature Race, awarded more points:

Position	**1st**	**2nd**	**3rd**	**4th**	**5th**	**6th**	**7th**	**8th**	**9th**	**10th**
Points	25	18	15	12	10	8	6	4	2	1

Points were awarded per class. If less than three cars entered in a class, half points were awarded for the race.

=== Formula 3 Cup standings ===
Pos	Driver	MNZ (Italy)		MUG (Italy)		HOC (Germany)		SVK (Slovakia)		BRN (Czech Republic)		IMO (Italy)		MIS (Italy)		Pts
Pos	Driver	SR	FR	SR	FR	SR	FR	SR	FR	SR	FR	SR	FR	SR	FR	Pts
1	(Switzerland) Sandro Zeller	1	2	2	4	2	2	1*	**1***	2	2	1	1	1	2	236.5
2	(Hungary) Benjámin Berta	2	**1**	1	**Ret**	**1**	**1**			**1**	**1**	2	**2**	7	Ret	187
3	(Italy) Andrea Benalli	3	8	4	1					4	4	3	3	3	3	127
4	(Denmark) Stig Larsen	5	6	3	2					7	8	Ret	6	4	4	84
5	(Italy) Dino Rasero	7	4	6	Ret					6	7	4	4	5	5	74
6	(Italy) Enzo Stentella	6	5	5	Ret					8	6	5	5	6	6	67
7	(Switzerland) Kurt Böhlen	4	3							3	5					47
8	(Poland) Victor Smialek													2	**1**	40
9	(Germany) Maximilian Malinowski					3	3									27
10	(Germany) Ludwig Kronawitter					4	4†			9	9					26
11	(Italy) Laurence Balestrini	DNS	7	7	3											25
12	(Czech Republic) Václav Šafář									5	3					23
13	(Switzerland) Christof Ledermann							2*	2*							16.5
14	(Italy) Riccardo Perego	8	Ret													3
Pos	Driver	SR	FR	SR	FR	SR	FR	SR	FR	SR	FR	SR	FR	SR	FR	Pts
Pos	Driver	MNZ (Italy)		MUG (Italy)		HOC (Germany)		SVK (Slovakia)		BRN (Czech Republic)		IMO (Italy)		MIS (Italy)		Pts

=== Formula Regional Class standings ===
Pos	Driver	MNZ (Italy)		MUG (Italy)		HOC (Germany)		SVK (Slovakia)		BRN (Czech Republic)		IMO (Italy)		MIS (Italy)		Pts
Pos	Driver	SR	FR	SR	FR	SR	FR	SR	FR	SR	FR	SR	FR	SR	FR	Pts
1	(France) Jérémy Clavaud	1	1	1	1							Ret	1			115
2	(Switzerland) Christof Ledermann	3	3	3	2					1*	1*	2	2			112.5
3	(Italy) Luca Iannacone					1†*	1*	1*	1*	2*	2*	3	3	2*	2*	105
4	(Italy) Mattia Bagioni	2	2											1*	1*	55.5
5	(France) Sebastien Banchereau			2	3							1	DNS			40
6	(Italy) Sandro de Virgilis	Ret	4													12
7	(Italy) Andrea Masci	4	DNS													10
8	(Italy) Sara Fruncillo	5	Ret													8
Pos	Driver	SR	FR	SR	FR	SR	FR	SR	FR	SR	FR	SR	FR	SR	FR	Pts
Pos	Driver	MNZ (Italy)		MUG (Italy)		HOC (Germany)		SVK (Slovakia)		BRN (Czech Republic)		IMO (Italy)		MIS (Italy)		Pts

Colour	Result
Gold	Winner
Silver	Second place
Bronze	Third place
Green	Points classification
Blue	Non-points classification
Blue	Non-classified finish (NC)
Purple	Retired, not classified (Ret)
Red	Did not qualify (DNQ)
Red	Did not pre-qualify (DNPQ)
Black	Disqualified (DSQ)
White	Did not start (DNS)
White	Withdrew (WD)
White	Race cancelled (C)
Blank	Did not practice (DNP)
Blank	Did not arrive (DNA)
Blank	Excluded (EX)

**Bold** – Pole

Italics – Fastest Lap

† – Did not finish, but classified

* – half points awarded as less than three cars entered the race

=== Formula 3 Trophy standings ===
Pos	Driver	MNZ (Italy)		MUG (Italy)		HOC (Germany)		SVK (Slovakia)		BRN (Czech Republic)		IMO (Italy)		MIS (Italy)		Pts
Pos	Driver	SR	FR	SR	FR	SR	FR	SR	FR	SR	FR	SR	FR	SR	FR	Pts
1	(Germany) André Petropoulos			2	2	3	1			2	1	Ret	1	2	2	168
2	(United Kingdom) Lee Cunningham	1	3	3	6	4	5†			1	3	3	4	3	3	161
3	(Germany) Oliver Kratsch	2	1							3	2	2	3	1	1	145
4	(Italy) Davide Pedetti	4	4	1	1							4	5	5	6	103
5	(Switzerland) Marcel Tobler			4	3	1	3			4	4					82
6	(Switzerland) Urs Rüttimann					2	2	3†	1							70
7	(Italy) Romano Cataldo	3	2	5	4							7	8			58
8	(Austria) Nikolay Takev							1	3†	WD	WD					35
9	(Austria) Roman Pöllinger							2	2							33
10	(Italy) Enrico Milani									5	Ret	6	6	4	11	32
11	(Italy) Francesco Solfaroli											5	7	6	5	30
12	(Italy) Antonio Pellegrini											8	9	7	4	21
13	(Italy) Giuseppe Marinaro											1	Ret			20
14	(Germany) Christian Zeller					5	4									20
15	(Czech Republic) Václav Šafář											Ret	2			18
=16	(Italy) Antonio Montruccoli	5	6													16
=16	(Italy) Luca Iannacone			6	5											16
18	(Italy) Umberto Vaglio	DNS	5									10	10	12	12	12
19	(Italy) Federico Porri													10	7	7
20	(Czech Republic) Tomáš Chabr									WD	WD	WD	WD	8	10	4
21	(Austria) Michael Aberer									WD	WD			11	8	4
22	(Italy) Patrick Bellezza													9	9	4
23	(Italy) Antonio Marco Rinaldi											9	DNS			2
—	(Austria) Alexander Geier									WD	WD					0
—	(Italy) Sergio Terrini											WD	WD			0
Pos	Driver	SR	FR	SR	FR	SR	FR	SR	FR	SR	FR	SR	FR	SR	FR	Pts
Pos	Driver	MNZ (Italy)		MUG (Italy)		HOC (Germany)		SVK (Slovakia)		BRN (Czech Republic)		IMO (Italy)		MIS (Italy)		Pts

=== Formula Light Cup standings ===
Pos	Driver	MNZ (Italy)		MUG (Italy)		HOC (Germany)		SVK (Slovakia)		BRN (Czech Republic)		IMO (Italy)		MIS (Italy)		Pts
Pos	Driver	SR	FR	SR	FR	SR	FR	SR	FR	SR	FR	SR	FR	SR	FR	Pts
1	(Austria) Michael Fischer					1	1	1	1	1	1	1	2	2	2	206
2	(Italy) Karim Sartori	2	2	2	2							2	1	1	1	151
3	(Germany) Nicolas Löffler	4	DNS	3	3	7	3	Ret	7†	4	4	4	5	5	6	120
4	(France) Sarene Ziffel					2	2	Ret	3	3	2			7	3	97
5	(Portugal) Luis Aguiar	1	1	1	1											90
6	(Austria) Dr. Norbert Groer			5	5	5	10	5	6	5	5	Ret	6	10	9	72
7	(Austria) Alexander Fritz					8	7	3	2	2	3					69
8	(Hungary) Zeno Kovacs							2	4					3	4	51
9	(Germany) Thomas Hoffmann					4	4					5	4			42
10	(Italy) Fabio Turchetto	3	3									WD	WD	4	8	41
11	(Austria) Dominic Makolm											3	3			27
12	(Italy) Vincenzo Siciliano	7	5	7	7											24
13	(France) Tristan Morel			4	4											22
14	(United States) Robert Siska			Ret	8	9	8					6	7			22
15	(Germany) Dennis Hübl					3	6									20
16	(Hungary) Adam Kovacs							4	5							20
17	(Italy) Domenico Terron	6	Ret	6	6							WD	WD			20
18	(Italy) Riccardo Rossi	8	4											11	10	16
=19	(Switzerland) Stephan Glaser	5	6													16
=19	(Austria) Alexander Geier													6	5	16
21	(France) Bruno Mottez			8	9							7	8	13	Ret	15
22	(Austria) Jürgen Berger					10†	5									11
23	(Hungary) Vida Benedek													8	7	9
24	(Austria) Norbert Lenzenweger					6	9									8
25	(Italy) Matteo Zoccali											8	9	12	Ret	5
26	(Italy) Vito di Bello													9	11	2
—	(Austria) Markus Fischer									WD	WD					0
—	(Austria) Marco Milani									WD	WD					0
—	(Italy) Giovanni Ciccarelli											WD	WD			0
—	(Italy) Luca Guolo											WD	WD			0
Pos	Driver	SR	FR	SR	FR	SR	FR	SR	FR	SR	FR	SR	FR	SR	FR	Pts
Pos	Driver	MNZ (Italy)		MUG (Italy)		HOC (Germany)		SVK (Slovakia)		BRN (Czech Republic)		IMO (Italy)		MIS (Italy)		Pts
