= 2018 Remus F3 Cup =

Motor racing competition

The 2018 Remus F3 Cup was the 37th Austria Formula 3 Cup season and the sixth Remus F3 Cup season.

== Teams and drivers ==
All Cup cars were built between 2008 and 2011, while Trophy cars were built between 1992 and 2007.

Numbers used at Remus F3 Cup events listed; numbers used at races run to F2000 Italian Formula Trophy regulations displayed in tooltips.

Team	Chassis	Engine	No.	Driver	Class	Rounds
(Austria) Franz Wöss Racing	Dallara F308	Opel-Spiess	1	(Germany) Angelique Germann	C	5
(Austria) Franz Wöss Racing	Dallara F305	Volkswagen-Spiess	10	(Switzerland) Thomas Aregger	C	1
(Austria) Franz Wöss Racing	Dallara F305	Volkswagen-Spiess	10	(Italy) Luca Iannaccone	T	2–3, 6–7
(Austria) Franz Wöss Racing	Dallara F309	Volkswagen-Spiess	11	(Switzerland) Kurt Böhlen	C	1, 3–4, 6–7
(Austria) Franz Wöss Racing	Dallara F309	Volkswagen-Spiess	12	(Austria) Stefan Neuburger	C	2
(Austria) Franz Wöss Racing	Dallara F306	Opel-Spiess	12	(Italy) Luca Iannaccone	C	1
(Austria) Franz Wöss Racing	Dallara F308	Opel-Spiess	12	(Germany) Dr. Ulrich Drechsler	C	3–4
(Switzerland) Jo Zeller Racing	Dallara F306	Mercedes	2	(Switzerland) Urs Rüttimann	T	1, 3, 7
(Switzerland) Jo Zeller Racing	Dallara F308	Mercedes	3	(Switzerland) Marcel Tobler	C	All
(Switzerland) Jo Zeller Racing	Dallara F306	Volkswagen-Spiess	44	(Switzerland) Sandro Zeller	T	All
(Switzerland) Jo Zeller Racing	Dallara F305	Opel-Spiess	61	(Germany) Dr. Ralph Pütz	T	1, 5
(Germany) Speed Center Motorsport	Dallara F308	Mercedes	7	(Germany) Christian Zeller	C	1–2, 5
(Italy) Puresport	Dallara F310	Volkswagen-Spiess	8	(Italy) Dino Rasero	C	1–2, 4, 6
(Austria) LS Performance	Dallara F305	Opel-Spiess	9	(Austria) Mario Schopper	T	2
(Austria) LS Performance	Dallara F305	Opel-Spiess	9	(Austria) Manfred Lang	T	7
(Italy) Scuderia Antonio (Italy) Twister Italia	Dallara F312	Mercedes	16	(Switzerland) Antoine Bottiroli	C	5–6
(Italy) Scuderia Antonio (Italy) Twister Italia	Dallara F311	Volkswagen-Spiess	77	(Switzerland) Antonino Pellegrino	C	1–4, 6
(Italy) Scuderia Antonio (Italy) Twister Italia	Dallara F311	Fiat-FPT	78	(France) Jean-Luc Neri	C	1
(Republic of Ireland) SV-Racing	Dallara F302	Toyota	19	(Republic of Ireland) Tim Buckley	T	2–3
(Germany) Jörg Sandek	Dallara F302	Opel-Spiess	22	(Germany) Jörg Sandek	T	4–5
(Germany) Philipp Regensperger	Dallara F305	Opel-Spiess	33	(Germany) Philipp Regensperger	C	1–2, 4–5, 7
(Austria) HR-Formula-Racing	Dallara F308	Opel-Spiess	70	(Austria) Josef Halwachs	C	7
(Czech Republic) Frasmotorsport	Dallara F302	Opel-Spiess	72	(Czech Republic) Antonin Sus	T	2, 4–5
(Czech Republic) GT2 Motorsport	Dallara F308	Opel-Spiess	98	(Czech Republic) Václav Šafář	C	7
(Italy) Monolite Racing	Dallara F312	Mercedes	99	(Italy) Andrea Cola	C	All
(Italy) Paolo Brajnik	Dallara F311	Volkswagen-Spiess	212	(Italy) Paolo Brajnik	C	1–3, 6–7
(Hungary) Magyar Racing Team	Dallara F397	Opel-Spiess	999	(Hungary) Attila Penzes	T	All

== Calendar and race results ==
Round 2 to 4 and 6 (Red Bull Ring, Monza, Most and Imola) were held together with the F2000 Italian Formula Trophy, however, all F2000 competitors would be ineligible to score Remus F3 Cup points.

R.	RN	Circuit	Date	Pole position	Fastest lap	Winning driver	Winning team	Trophy winner
1	1	(Germany) Hockenheimring, Hockenheim	14 April	(Switzerland) Sandro Zeller	(Switzerland) Sandro Zeller	(Switzerland) Sandro Zeller	(Switzerland) Jo Zeller Racing	(Switzerland) Sandro Zeller
1	2	(Germany) Hockenheimring, Hockenheim	14 April	(Switzerland) Sandro Zeller	(Switzerland) Sandro Zeller	(Switzerland) Sandro Zeller	(Switzerland) Jo Zeller Racing	(Switzerland) Sandro Zeller
2	3	(Austria) Red Bull Ring, Spielberg	19 May	(Italy) Alessandro Bracalente	(Switzerland) Sandro Zeller	(Switzerland) Sandro Zeller	(Switzerland) Jo Zeller Racing	(Switzerland) Sandro Zeller
2	4	(Austria) Red Bull Ring, Spielberg	20 May	(Poland) Bartolomiej Mirecki	(Italy) Andrea Cola	(Switzerland) Sandro Zeller	(Switzerland) Jo Zeller Racing	(Switzerland) Sandro Zeller
3	5	(Italy) Autodromo Nazionale Monza, Monza	2 June	(Switzerland) Sandro Zeller	(Italy) Riccardo Perego	(Italy) Andrea Cola	(Italy) Monolite Racing	(Republic of Ireland) Tim Buckley
3	6	(Italy) Autodromo Nazionale Monza, Monza	3 June	(Switzerland) Sandro Zeller	(Switzerland) Sandro Zeller	(Switzerland) Sandro Zeller	(Switzerland) Jo Zeller Racing	(Switzerland) Sandro Zeller
4	7	(Czech Republic) Autodrom Most, Most	23 June	(Switzerland) Sandro Zeller	(Switzerland) Sandro Zeller	(Switzerland) Sandro Zeller	(Switzerland) Jo Zeller Racing	(Switzerland) Sandro Zeller
4	8	(Czech Republic) Autodrom Most, Most	24 June	(Italy) Alessandro Bracalente	(Switzerland) Sandro Zeller	(Switzerland) Sandro Zeller	(Switzerland) Jo Zeller Racing	(Switzerland) Sandro Zeller
5	9	(Germany) Lausitzring, Klettwitz	14 July	(Switzerland) Sandro Zeller	(Switzerland) Sandro Zeller	(Switzerland) Sandro Zeller	(Switzerland) Jo Zeller Racing	(Switzerland) Sandro Zeller
5	10	(Germany) Lausitzring, Klettwitz	15 July	(Switzerland) Sandro Zeller	(Switzerland) Sandro Zeller	(Switzerland) Sandro Zeller	(Switzerland) Jo Zeller Racing	(Switzerland) Sandro Zeller
6	11	(Italy) Autodromo Enzo e Dino Ferrari, Imola	28 July		(Italy) Alessandro Bracalente	(Switzerland) Sandro Zeller	(Switzerland) Jo Zeller Racing	(Switzerland) Sandro Zeller
6	12	(Italy) Autodromo Enzo e Dino Ferrari, Imola	29 July		(Italy) Alessandro Bracalente	(Switzerland) Sandro Zeller	(Switzerland) Jo Zeller Racing	(Switzerland) Sandro Zeller
7	13	(Czech Republic) Brno Circuit, Brno	8 September	(Czech Republic) Václav Šafář	(Czech Republic) Václav Šafář	(Switzerland) Sandro Zeller	(Switzerland) Jo Zeller Racing	(Switzerland) Sandro Zeller
7	14	(Czech Republic) Brno Circuit, Brno	9 September	(Czech Republic) Václav Šafář	(Switzerland) Sandro Zeller	(Switzerland) Sandro Zeller	(Switzerland) Jo Zeller Racing	(Switzerland) Sandro Zeller

== Championship standings ==
Position	1st	2nd	3rd	4th	5th	6th	7th	8th	9th	10th
Points	25	18	15	12	10	8	6	4	2	1

=== Cup ===
Pos	Driver	HOC (Germany)		RBR (Austria)		MON (Italy)		MOS (Czech Republic)		LAU (Germany)		IMO (Italy)		BRN (Czech Republic)		Pts
1	(Switzerland) Sandro Zeller	1	1	1	1	10	1	1	1	1	1	1	1	1	1	326
2	(Italy) Andrea Cola	DSQ	8	3	2	1	4	6	6	2	2	5	7	5	6	160
3	(Switzerland) Marcel Tobler	3	3	4	4	3	5	8	Ret	3	3	4	4	6	7	151
4	(Germany) Philipp Regensperger	2	4	2	3	2	2							3	4	126
5	(Switzerland) Kurt Böhlen	4	2			2	2	3	7			7	5	4	5	125
6	(Switzerland) Antonino Pellegrino	7	5	9	6	4	3	5	3			2	2			114
7	(Italy) Dino Rasero	5	6	6	8			7	5			3	3			76
8	(Italy) Paolo Brajnik			Ret	5	Ret	6					6	6	7	3	55
9	(Czech Republic) Václav Šafář													2	2	36
10	(Switzerland) Antoine Bottiroli							4	4			10	8			29
11	(Germany) Jörg Sandek									4	4					24
12	(Hungary) Attila Penzes	10	10	10	10	8	8	10	8			8	9	11	11	23
12	(Switzerland) Urs Rüttimann	8	9			6	7							9	10	23
14	(Germany) Christian Zeller	6	7	8	11											18
15	(Germany) Dr. Ralph Pütz									6	5					18
16	(Austria) Mario Schopper			5	Ret											10
17	(Republic of Ireland) Tim Buckley			Ret	12	5	11									10
18	(Czech Republic) Antonin Sus			7	9			9	DNS							10
19	(Germany) Angelique Germann									5	DNS					10
20	(Germany) Dr. Ulrich Drechsler					7	9	Ret	Ret							8
20	(Italy) Luca Iannoccone	9	11	11	13	9	10					9	10	12	12	8
22	(Austria) Josef Halwachs													8	8	8
23	(Austria) Stefan Neuburger			DNS	7											6
24	(Austria) Manfred Lang													10	9	6
25	(France) Jean-Luc Neri	12	13													0
26	(Switzerland) Thomas Aregger	DNS	DNS													0
Pos	Driver	HOC (Germany)		RBR (Austria)		MON (Italy)		MOS (Czech Republic)		LAU (Germany)		IMO (Italy)		BRN (Czech Republic)		Pts

=== Trophy ===
Pos	Driver	HOC (Germany)		RBR (Austria)		MON (Italy)		MOS (Czech Republic)		LAU (Germany)		IMO (Italy)		BRN (Czech Republic)		Pts
1	(Switzerland) Sandro Zeller	1	1	1	1	10	1	1	1	1	1	1	1	1	1	335
2	(Hungary) Attila Penzes	10	10	10	10	8	8	10	8			8	9	11	11	180
3	(Switzerland) Urs Rüttimann	8	9			6	7							9	10	105
4	(Italy) Luca Iannacone			11	13	9	10					9	10	12	12	94
5	(Germany) Dr. Ralph Pütz	11	12							6	5					54
6	(Czech Republic) Antonin Sus			7	9			9	DNS							51
7	(Germany) Jörg Sandek							11	DNS	4	4					48
8	(Republic of Ireland) Tim Buckley			Ret	12	5	11									47
9	(Austria) Manfred Lang													10	9	33
10	(Austria) Mario Schopper			5	Ret											18
Pos	Driver	HOC (Germany)		RBR (Austria)		MON (Italy)		MOS (Czech Republic)		LAU (Germany)		IMO (Italy)		BRN (Czech Republic)		Pts

=== Drexler Automotive Formula 3 Cup ===
All German drivers or drivers that use a Drexler Automotive gearbox are eligible to score points for the Drexler Automotive Formula 3 Cup.

Pos	Driver	HOC (Germany)		RBR (Austria)		MON (Italy)		MOS (Czech Republic)		LAU (Germany)		IMO (Italy)		BRN (Czech Republic)		Pts
1	(Switzerland) Sandro Zeller	1	1	1	1	10	1	1	1	1	1	1	1	1	1	335
2	(Switzerland) Antonino Pellegrino	7	5	9	6	4	3	5	3			2	2			163
3	(Germany) Philipp Regensperger	2	4	2	3			2	2					3	4	144
4	(Switzerland) Urs Rüttimann	8	9			6	7							9	10	53
5	(Germany) Christian Zeller	6	7	8	11											54
6	(Germany) Jörg Sandek							11	DNS	4	4					48
6	(Italy) Luca Martucci †			NC	NC							NC	NC			48
8	(Germany) Dr. Ralph Pütz	11	12							6	5					39
9	(Germany) Christian Wachter †	NC	NC	NC	NC											34
10	(Germany) Dr. Ulrich Drechsler					7	9									27
11	(Austria) Josef Halwachs													8	8	24
12	(Germany) Angelique Germann									5	DNS					10
Pos	Driver	HOC (Germany)		RBR (Austria)		MON (Italy)		MOS (Czech Republic)		LAU (Germany)		IMO (Italy)		BRN (Czech Republic)		Pts

† Although Wachter and Martucci weren't participating in any Remus F3 Cup classes, they were eligible to score points in the Drexler Automotive Formula 3 Cup.

=== HORAG Swiss Formula 3 Cup ===
Pos	Driver	HOC (Germany)		RBR (Austria)		MON (Italy)		MOS (Czech Republic)		LAU (Germany)		IMO (Italy)		BRN (Czech Republic)		Pts
1	(Switzerland) Sandro Zeller	1	1	1	1	10	1	1	1	1	1	1	1	1	1	285
2	(Switzerland) Marcel Tobler	3	3	4	4	3	5	8	Ret	3	3	4	4	6	7	205
3	(Switzerland) Kurt Böhlen	4	2			2	2	3	7			7	5	4	5	166
4	(Switzerland) Antonino Pellegrino	7	5	9	6	4	3	5	3			2	2			147
5	(Switzerland) Antoine Bottiroli †			NC	NC			4	4			10	8			85
6	(Switzerland) Urs Rüttimann	8	9			6	7							9	10	66
7	(Switzerland) Thomas Aregger	DNS	DNS													0
Pos	Driver	HOC (Germany)		RBR (Austria)		MON (Italy)		MOS (Czech Republic)		LAU (Germany)		IMO (Italy)		BRN (Czech Republic)		Pts

† Antoine Bottiroli was competing in F2000 Italian Trophy at the Red Bull Ring races.
