= 2017 Remus F3 Cup =

Motor racing competition

The 2017 Remus F3 Cup was the 36th Austria Formula 3 Cup season and the fifth Remus F3 Cup season.

== Teams and drivers ==
All Cup cars were built between 2008 and 2011, while Trophy cars were built between 1992 and 2007.

Numbers used at Remus F3 Cup events listed; numbers used at races run to F2 Italian Trophy and/or MSV F3 Cup regulations displayed in tooltips.

Team	Chassis	Engine	No.	Driver	Class	Rounds
(Austria) Franz Wöss Racing	Dallara F308	Opel-Spiess	1	(Germany) Angelique Germann	C	1–4
(Austria) Franz Wöss Racing	Dallara F308	Opel-Spiess	11	(Switzerland) Kurt Böhlen	C	All
(Austria) Franz Wöss Racing	Dallara F308	Opel-Spiess	5	(Germany) Florian Schnitzenbaumer	C	1
(Austria) Franz Wöss Racing	Dallara F308	Opel-Spiess	5	(Italy) Luca Iannaccone	C	3
(Austria) Franz Wöss Racing	Dallara F308	Opel-Spiess	12	(Italy) Luca Iannaccone	C	4, 6–7
(Austria) Franz Wöss Racing	Dallara F308	Opel-Spiess	12	(Switzerland) Thomas Aregger	C	5
(Austria) Franz Wöss Racing	Dallara F305	Opel-Spiess	10	(Germany) Dr. Ulrich Drechsler	T	1–2, 4–6
(Austria) Franz Wöss Racing	Dallara F305	Opel-Spiess	33	(Germany) Philipp Regensperger	C	All
(Switzerland) Jo Zeller Racing	Dallara F306	Mercedes	2	(Switzerland) Urs Rüttimann	T	1, 4
(Switzerland) Jo Zeller Racing	Dallara F308	Mercedes	3	(Switzerland) Marcel Tobler	C	1–4, 6–7
(Switzerland) Jo Zeller Racing	Dallara F308	Mercedes	44	(Switzerland) Sandro Zeller	C	1
(Switzerland) Jo Zeller Racing	Dallara F306	Volkswagen-Spiess	44	(Switzerland) Sandro Zeller	T	2–7
(Germany) CR-Racing Team	Dallara F309	Volkswagen-Spiess	6	(Germany) Andreas Germann	C	1
(Germany) CR-Racing Team	Dallara F308	Mercedes	7	(Germany) Christian Zeller	C	5
(Austria) LS-Performance	Dallara F305	Opel-Spiess	8	(Austria) Manfred Lang	T	1, 3, 5–6
(Republic of Ireland) VS Racing	Dallara F302	Toyota	990	(Republic of Ireland) Tim Buckley	T	2, 4
(United Kingdom) Chris Dittmann Racing	Dallara F308	Mercedes	9	(United Kingdom) Peter Venn	C	4
(Belgium) Jordi Weckx	Dallara F308	Volkswagen-Spiess	12	(Belgium) Jordi Weckx	C	6
(Italy) Scuderia F3 Italia	Dallara F311	Fiat-FPT	14	(Italy) Franco Cimarelli	C	2, 4
(Poland) AS Motorsport	Dallara F311	Toyota	22	(Poland) Alex Karkosik	C	3
(Germany) Christian Wachter	Dallara F308	Fiat-FPT	24	(Germany) Christian Wachter	C	1, 3–7
(France) Sylvain Warnecke	Dallara F302	Opel-Spiess	25	(France) Sylvain Warnecke	T	6
(Italy) Twister Italia	Dallara F308	Toyota	27	(Italy) Luca Iannaccone	C	2
(Italy) Puresport	Dallara F308	Fiat-FPT	28	(Italy) Dino Rasero	C	3–4
(Austria) HR-Formula- Racing	Dallara F308	Opel-Spiess	70	(Austria) Josef Halwachs	C	5–6
(Czech Republic) Fras Motorsport	Dallara F302	Opel-Spiess	72	(Czech Republic) Antonin Sus	T	3–4, 6
(Germany) Franz Xaver Guggenmos	Dallara F397	Opel	78	(Germany) Franz Guggenmos	T	3
(Italy) Monolite Racing	Dallara F312	Mercedes	99	(Italy) Andrea Cola	C	3–4, 6–7
(Italy) Paolo Brajnik	Dallara F308	Volkswagen-Spiess	212	(Italy) Paolo Brajnik	C	1–3, 6

Icon	Class
C	Cup
T	Trophy

== Calendar & Race results ==
Round 2, 4 and 7 (Imola, Spa-Francorchamps and Mugello) were held together with the F2 Italian Trophy. The MSV F3 Cup joined both series at Spa-Francorchamps. However, neither Italian F2 Trophy drivers nor MSV F3 Cup competitors were eligible to score Remus F3 Cup points.

R.	RN	Circuit	Date	Pole position	Fastest lap	Winning driver	Winning team	Trophy winner
1	1	(Germany) Hockenheimring, Hockenheim	8 April	(Italy) Paolo Brajnik	(Italy) Paolo Brajnik	(Switzerland) Sandro Zeller	(Switzerland) Jo Zeller Racing	(Germany) Dr. Ulrich Drechsler
1	2	(Germany) Hockenheimring, Hockenheim	9 April	(Switzerland) Sandro Zeller	(Italy) Paolo Brajnik	(Switzerland) Sandro Zeller	(Switzerland) Jo Zeller Racing	(Switzerland) Urs Rüttimann
2	3	(Italy) Autodromo Enzo e Dino Ferrari, Imola	29 April	(Germany) Philipp Regensperger	(Switzerland) Sandro Zeller	(Germany) Philipp Regensperger	(Austria) Franz Wöss Racing	(Switzerland) Sandro Zeller
2	4	(Italy) Autodromo Enzo e Dino Ferrari, Imola	30 April	(Germany) Philipp Regensperger	(Germany) Philipp Regensperger	(Switzerland) Sandro Zeller	(Switzerland) Jo Zeller Racing	(Switzerland) Sandro Zeller
3	5	(Austria) Red Bull Ring, Spielberg	20 May	(Switzerland) Sandro Zeller	(Germany) Philipp Regensperger	(Switzerland) Sandro Zeller	(Switzerland) Jo Zeller Racing	(Switzerland) Sandro Zeller
3	6	(Austria) Red Bull Ring, Spielberg	21 May	(Italy) Andrea Cola	(Switzerland) Sandro Zeller	(Italy) Andrea Cola	(Italy) Monolite Racing	(Switzerland) Sandro Zeller
4	7	(Belgium) Circuit de Spa-Francorchamps, Francorchamps	24 June	(United Kingdom) Hywel Lloyd	(United Kingdom) Hywel Lloyd	(United Kingdom) Hywel Lloyd	(United Kingdom) Chris Dittmann Racing	(Switzerland) Sandro Zeller
4	8	(Belgium) Circuit de Spa-Francorchamps, Francorchamps	25 June		(United Kingdom) Hywel Lloyd	(United Kingdom) Hywel Lloyd	(United Kingdom) Chris Dittmann Racing	(Switzerland) Sandro Zeller
5	9	(Germany) Lausitzring, Klettwitz	7 July	(Switzerland) Sandro Zeller		(Germany) Philipp Regensperger	(Austria) Franz Wöss Racing	(Switzerland) Sandro Zeller
5	10	(Germany) Lausitzring, Klettwitz	8 July	(Switzerland) Sandro Zeller	(Switzerland) Sandro Zeller	(Switzerland) Sandro Zeller	(Switzerland) Jo Zeller Racing	(Switzerland) Sandro Zeller
6	11	(Czech Republic) Brno Circuit, Brno	9 September	(Switzerland) Sandro Zeller	(Switzerland) Sandro Zeller	(Switzerland) Sandro Zeller	(Switzerland) Jo Zeller Racing	(Switzerland) Sandro Zeller
6	12	(Czech Republic) Brno Circuit, Brno	10 September	(Switzerland) Sandro Zeller	(Switzerland) Sandro Zeller	(Switzerland) Sandro Zeller	(Switzerland) Jo Zeller Racing	(Switzerland) Sandro Zeller
7	13	(Italy) Mugello Circuit, Mugello	7 October	(Switzerland) Sandro Zeller	(Switzerland) Sandro Zeller	(Switzerland) Sandro Zeller	(Switzerland) Jo Zeller Racing	(Switzerland) Sandro Zeller
7	14	(Italy) Mugello Circuit, Mugello	8 October	(Switzerland) Sandro Zeller	(Switzerland) Kurt Böhlen	(Switzerland) Sandro Zeller	(Switzerland) Jo Zeller Racing	(Switzerland) Sandro Zeller

== Championship standings ==
Position	1st	2nd	3rd	4th	5th	6th	7th	8th	9th	10th
Points	25	18	15	12	10	8	6	4	2	1

=== Cup ===
Pos	Driver	HOC (Germany)		IMO (Italy)		RBR (Austria)		SPA (Belgium)		LAU (Germany)		BRN (Czech Republic)		MUG (Italy)		Pts
1	(Switzerland) Sandro Zeller	1	1	2	1	1	2	13	7	2	1	1	1	1	1	300
2	(Germany) Philipp Regensperger	Ret	3	1	2	2	3	3	4	1	2	2	2	Ret	DNS	213
3	(Switzerland) Kurt Böhlen	3	4	4	3	3	5	12	3	3	3	4	6	2	2	198
4	(Switzerland) Marcel Tobler	4	6	6	5	5	4	10	20			6	5	4	4	115
5	(Italy) Andrea Cola					4	1	9	Ret			5	3	3	3	107
6	(Italy) Paolo Brajnik	2	2	3	Ret	Ret	11					3	4			78
7	(Germany) Angelique Germann	5	5	5	Ret	7	8	Ret	11							52
8	(Italy) Franco Cimarelli			Ret	4			6	12							40
9	(Austria) Manfred Lang	7	8			10	10			5	7	8	7			38
10	(Germany) Dr. Ulrich Drechsler	9	9	7	8			19	18	7	8	9	9			33
11	(Switzerland) Thomas Aregger									4	4					24
11	(Germany) Christian Wachter	10	10			14	15	16	Ret	8	Ret	13	DSQ	6	6	24
11	(Italy) Luca Iannaccone			9	7	13	14	20	25			11	11	7	5	24
14	(Italy) Dino Rasero					8	7	Ret	19							22
15	(Switzerland) Urs Rüttimann	6	7					Ret	17							20
15	(Republic of Ireland) Tim Buckley			8	6			Ret	16							20
17	(Germany) Christian Zeller									6	5					18
17	(Austria) Josef Halwachs									Ret	6	7	8			18
19	(Poland) Alex Karkosik					6	6									16
20	(United Kingdom) Peter Venn							11	Ret							10
20	(Czech Republic) Antonin Sus					9	9	14	22			10	10			10
22	(Germany) Andreas Germann	8	Ret													4
Pos	Driver	HOC (Germany)		IMO (Italy)		RBR (Austria)		SPA (Belgium)		LAU (Germany)		BRN (Czech Republic)		MUG (Italy)		Pts

=== Trophy ===
Pos	Driver	HOC (Germany)		IMO (Italy)		RBR (Austria)		SPA (Belgium)		LAU (Germany)		BRN (Czech Republic)		MUG (Italy)		Pts
1	(Switzerland) Sandro Zeller			2	1	1	1	13	7	2	1	1	1	1	1	225
2	(Germany) Dr. Ulrich Drechsler	9	9	7	8			19	18	7	8	9	9			127.5
3	(Austria) Manfred Lang	7	8			10	10			5	7	8	7			102
4	(Czech Republic) Antonin Sus					9	9	14	22			10	10			88
5	(Switzerland) Urs Rüttimann	6	7					Ret	17							40
6	(Republic of Ireland) Tim Buckley			8	6			Ret	16							34.5
7	(Germany) Franz Guggemos							12	13							20
7	(France) Sylvain Warnecke											12	12			20
Pos	Driver	HOC (Germany)		IMO (Italy)		RBR (Austria)		SPA (Belgium)		LAU (Germany)		BRN (Czech Republic)		MUG (Italy)		Pts

=== German F3 Trophy ===
Pos	Driver	HOC (Germany)		IMO (Italy)		RBR (Austria)		SPA (Belgium)		LAU (Germany)		BRN (Czech Republic)		MUG (Italy)		Pts
1	(Germany) Philipp Regensperger	Ret	3	1	2	2	3	3	4	1	2	2	2	Ret	DNS	275
2	(Germany) Dr. Ulrich Drechsler	9	9	7	8			19	18	7	8	9	9			186
3	(Germany) Christian Wachter	10	10			14	15	16	Ret	8	Ret	13	DSQ	6	6	151
4	(Germany) Angelique Germann	5	5	5	Ret	7	8	Ret	11							115
5	(Germany) Christian Zeller									6	5					36
6	(Germany) Franz Guggemos							12	13							24
7	(Germany) Andreas Germann	8	Ret													18
7	(United Kingdom) Peter Venn							11	Ret							18
Pos	Driver	HOC (Germany)		IMO (Italy)		RBR (Austria)		SPA (Belgium)		LAU (Germany)		BRN (Czech Republic)		MUG (Italy)		Pts

=== Swiss F3 Cup ===
Pos	Driver	HOC (Germany)		IMO (Italy)		RBR (Austria)		SPA (Belgium)		LAU (Germany)		BRN (Czech Republic)		MUG (Italy)		Pts
1	(Switzerland) Sandro Zeller	1	1	2	1	1	1	13	7	2	1	1	1	1	1	333
2	(Switzerland) Kurt Böhlen	3	4	4	3	3	5	12	3	3	3	4	6	2	2	253
3	(Switzerland) Marcel Tobler	4	6	6	5	5	4	10	20			6	5	4	4	193
4	(Switzerland) Urs Rüttimann	6	7					Ret	17							39
5	(Switzerland) Thomas Aregger									4	4					30
Pos	Driver	HOC (Germany)		IMO (Italy)		RBR (Austria)		SPA (Belgium)		LAU (Germany)		BRN (Czech Republic)		MUG (Italy)		Pts
