= 2021 Drexler-Automotive Formula 3 Cup =

Motor racing competition

The 2021 Drexler-Automotive Formula 3 Cup was the 40th Austria Formula 3 Cup season and the third Drexler-Automotive Formula 3 Cup season.

== Teams and drivers ==
All Cup cars were built before 2018, Trophy cars were built between 1990 and 2007, and Open class have more powerful engines.

Team	Chassis	Engine	No.	Driver	Class	Rounds
(Switzerland) Jo Zeller Racing	Dallara F306	Mercedes	2	(Switzerland) Urs Rüttimann	T	2, 4-5
(Switzerland) Jo Zeller Racing	Dallara F308	Mercedes	3	(Switzerland) Marcel Tobler	C	2, 4-5
(Switzerland) Jo Zeller Racing	Dallara F308	Mercedes	11	(Switzerland) Kurt Böhlen	C	4-5
(Switzerland) Jo Zeller Racing	Dallara F312	Mercedes	44	(Switzerland) Sandro Zeller	C	1-2, 4-6
(Czech Republic) Chabr Motorsport	Dallara F308	Mugen	4	(Czech Republic) Thomas Chabr	C	4-5
(Italy) AM Sport System	Dallara F312	Mercedes	5	(Italy) Marco Minelli	O	1, 5
Privateer	Dallara F312	Mercedes	5	(Italy) Marco Minelli	O	4, 6
(Italy) Facondini Racing	Dallara F308	Toyota	10	(Italy) Luca Iannaccone	C	1-2
(Austria) Franz Wöss Racing	Dallara F308	Opel-Spiess	10	(Italy) Luca Iannaccone	C	4-6
(Austria) Franz Wöss Racing	Dallara F309	Volkswagen	12	(Switzerland) Thomas Aregger	C	1-2, 4, 6
(Austria) Franz Wöss Racing	Dallara F308	Mugen	15	(Greece) Daniel Tapinos	C	All
(Austria) Franz Wöss Racing	Dallara F316	Opel	17	(Austria) Stefan Fürtbauer	C	1-5
(Austria) Franz Wöss Racing	Dallara F305	Opel-Spiess	61	(Germany) Prof. Dr. Ralph Pütz	T	3-4, 6
Privateer	Dallara F308	Fiat	6	(Italy) Enrico Milani	C	4
(Germany) Speed Center	Dallara F308	Mercedes	7	(Germany) Christian Zeller	C	4
(Germany) Speed Center	Dallara F317	Mercedes	13	(Germany) Philipp Todtenhaupt	C	4-5
(Germany) Speed Center	Dallara F317	Toyota	19	(Switzerland) Christian Eicke	C	4
(Germany) Speed Center	Dallara F317	Toyota	20	(Germany) Hans Laub	C	4
(Germany) Speed Center	Dallara F314	Toyota	99	(Germany) Markus Lehmann	C	4
Privateer	Dallara F311	Volkswagen	14	(Italy) Andrea Benalli	O	4
(Hungary) Gender Racing Team	Dallara F313	Toyota	12	(Slovakia) Nikolas Szabo	C	5
(Hungary) Gender Racing Team	Dallara F313	Toyota	113	(Hungary) Oliver Michl (Note: Oliver Michl is an Austrian-Hungarian driver who races under the Hungarian flag.)	C	1
(Austria) Team Hoffmann Racing	Dallara F314	Toyota	20	(Hungary) Benjamin Berta	C	5-6
(Austria) Team Hoffmann Racing	Dallara F314	Toyota	23	(Austria) Roman Hoffmann	C	3
(Germany) Rennsport Wachter	Dallara F308	Fiat	20	(Germany) Christian Wachter	O	1
(Germany) Rennsport Wachter	Dallara F308	Fiat	24	(Germany) Christian Wachter	O	2-4
Privateer	Dallara F312	Volkswagen	21	(Italy) Alesandro Bracalente	O	4
(Germany) Vogtland Racing Team	Dallara F308	Toyota	22	(Germany) Danny Luderer	C	1-2, 4
(Czech Republic) Effective Racing Team	Dallara F312	Mercedes	27	(Czech Republic) Vladimir Netušil	O	1-5
(Hungary) Magyar Racing Team	Tatuus FM	Honda	57	(Hungary) Janos Magyar	O	2, 4-5
(Czech Republic) HKC Academy Racing	Dallara F308	Fiat	62	(Czech Republic) Matej Kacovsky	C	1-2, 4
Privateer	Dallara 320	Volkswagen	212	(Serbia) Paolo Brajnik	O	1-2, 4
ASU NV Racing	Dallara 320	Volkswagen	212	(Serbia) Paolo Brajnik	O	5
Privateer	Dallara F312	Volkswagen	999	(Hungary) Attila Penzes	O	5

Icon	Class
C	Championship
T	Trophy
O	Open

== Race calendar and results ==
Round 5 was originally to be held at the Autodromo Enzo e Dino Ferrari, Imola between 16-18 July, but was cancelled by the organiser.

R.	RN	Circuit	Date	Pole position	Fastest lap	Cup Winner	Winning team	Trophy winner	Open Winner
1	1	(Italy) Autodromo Nazionale Monza, Monza	1 May	(Italy) Bernardo Pellegrini (Note: Pellegrini was competing in the F2000 Italian Formula Trophy which shared the track with this championship.)	(Switzerland) Sandro Zeller (Note: Bernardo Pellegrini set the overall fasted lap.)	(Switzerland) Sandro Zeller (Note: Bernardo Pellegrini was the overall race winner.)	(Switzerland) Jo Zeller Racing	no competitors	(Czech Republic) Vladimir Netušil
1	2	(Italy) Autodromo Nazionale Monza, Monza	2 May	(Italy) Bernardo Pellegrini	(Switzerland) Thomas Aregger	(Switzerland) Thomas Aregger	(Austria) Franz Wöss Racing	no competitors	(Czech Republic) Vladimir Netušil
2	1	(Austria) Red Bull Ring, Spielberg	21 May	(Switzerland) Sandro Zeller	(Serbia) Paolo Brajnik	(Switzerland) Sandro Zeller	(Switzerland) Jo Zeller Racing	no competitors	(Serbia) Paolo Brajnik
2	2	(Austria) Red Bull Ring, Spielberg	22 May	TBD	(Serbia) Paolo Brajnik	(Switzerland) Sandro Zeller	(Switzerland) Jo Zeller Racing	no competitors	(Serbia) Paolo Brajnik
3	1	(Austria) Salzburgring, Salzburg	12 June	(Czech Republic) Vladimir Netušil	(Czech Republic) Vladimir Netušil	(Austria) Stefan Fürtbauer	(Austria) Franz Wöss Racing	(Germany) Prof. Dr. Ralph Pütz	(Czech Republic) Vladimir Netušil
3	2	(Austria) Salzburgring, Salzburg	13 June	(Czech Republic) Vladimir Netušil	(Czech Republic) Vladimir Netušil	(Austria) Stefan Fürtbauer	(Austria) Franz Wöss Racing	(Germany) Prof. Dr. Ralph Pütz	(Czech Republic) Vladimir Netušil
4	1	(Belgium) Circuit de Spa-Francorchamps, Francorchamps	26 June	(Italy) Alesandro Bracalente	(Italy) Alesandro Bracalente	(Switzerland) Sandro Zeller	(Switzerland) Jo Zeller Racing	(Germany) Prof. Dr. Ralph Pütz	(Italy) Alesandro Bracalente
4	2	(Belgium) Circuit de Spa-Francorchamps, Francorchamps	27 June	(Italy) Alesandro Bracalente	(Italy) Alesandro Bracalente	(Switzerland) Sandro Zeller	(Switzerland) Jo Zeller Racing	(Switzerland) Urs Rüttimann	(Italy) Alesandro Bracalente
5	1	(Czech Republic) Brno Circuit, Brno	4 September	TBD	(Czech Republic) Vladimir Netušil	(Hungary) Benjamin Berta (Note: Vladimir Netušil was the overall race winner.)	(Austria) Team Hoffmann Racing	(Switzerland) Urs Rüttimann	(Czech Republic) Vladimir Netušil
5	2	(Czech Republic) Brno Circuit, Brno	5 September	TBD	(Hungary) Benjamin Berta	(Hungary) Benjamin Berta	(Austria) Team Hoffmann Racing	(Switzerland) Urs Rüttimann	(Czech Republic) Vladimir Netušil
6	1	(Italy) Autodromo Vallelunga, Vallelunga	30 October	(Italy) "Togo" (Note: "Togo" was competing in the F2000 Italian Formula Trophy which shared the track with this championship.)	(Italy) Marco Minelli (Note: Dino Rasero set the overall fasted lap.)	(Switzerland) Sandro Zeller	(Switzerland) Jo Zeller Racing	no drivers finished	(Italy) Marco Minelli
6	2	(Italy) Autodromo Vallelunga, Vallelunga	31 October	(Italy) Bernardo Pellegrini	(Italy) Marco Minelli	(Switzerland) Sandro Zeller	(Switzerland) Jo Zeller Racing	no competitors	(Italy) Marco Minelli

== Championship standings ==
Position	1st	2nd	3rd	4th	5th	6th	7th	8th	9th	10th
Main	25	18	15	12	10	8	6	4	2	1
Trophies	12.5	9	7.5	6	5	4	3	2	1	0.5

Standings for all competitions are shown below. There was no RAVENOL Formel 3 Cup classification for German drivers for this season.

=== Drexler-Automotive Formula 3 Cup ===
Pos	Driver	MON (Italy)		RBR (Austria)		SAL (Austria)		SPA (Belgium)		BRN (Czech Republic)		VAL (Italy)		Pts
1	(Switzerland) Sandro Zeller	1	Ret	**1**	1			1	1	2	2	1	1	211
2	(Switzerland) Thomas Aregger	4	1	2	2			2	2			2	Ret	124
3	(Austria) Stefan Fürtbauer	2	2	4	4	1	1	WD	WD	5	6			103
4	(Hungary) Benjamin Berta									1	1	2	2	86
5	(Switzerland) Marcel Tobler			3	3			3	3					78
6	(Italy) Luca Iannaccone	3	4	6	5			WD	WD	9	9	Ret	4	64
7	(Greece) Daniel Tapinos	WD	WD	WD	WD	2	2	6	11	21	7	4	3	59
8	(Switzerland) Kurt Böhlen							4	6	3	3			50
9	(Germany) Danny Luderer	Ret	3	5	6			8	5					47
10	(Czech Republic) Thomas Chabr							7	4	7	Ret			24
=10	(Slovakia) Nikolas Szabo									5	5			24
12	(Germany) Dr. Ralph Pütz					3	3	12	9			Ret	WD	17
13	(Switzerland) Urs Rüttimann			WD	WD			15	7	8	8			14
14	(Italy) Enrico Milani							5	13					10
15	(Germany) Hans Laub							11	8					4
16	(Germany) Christian Zeller							9	Ret					2
=16	(Germany) Philipp Todtemhaupt							9	25					2
18	(Germany) Markus Lehmann							10	14					1
19	(Switzerland) Christian Eicke							13	10					1
20	(Austria) Roman Hoffmann					Ret	WD							0
-	(Czech Republic) Matej Kacovsky	WD	WD	WD	WD			WD	WD					-
-	(Hungary) Oliver Michl	WD	WD											-
Pos	Driver	MON		RBR		SAL		SPA		BRN		VAL		Pts

Colour	Result
Gold	Winner
Silver	Second place
Bronze	Third place
Green	Points classification
Blue	Non-points classification
Blue	Non-classified finish (NC)
Purple	Retired, not classified (Ret)
Red	Did not qualify (DNQ)
Red	Did not pre-qualify (DNPQ)
Black	Disqualified (DSQ)
White	Did not start (DNS)
White	Withdrew (WD)
White	Race cancelled (C)
Blank	Did not practice (DNP)
Blank	Did not arrive (DNA)
Blank	Excluded (EX)

**Bold** – Pole
Italics – Fastest Lap

=== Drexler-Automotive Formula 3 Trophy ===
Pos	Driver	MON (Italy)	RBR (Austria)		SAL (Austria)		SPA (Belgium)		BRN (Czech Republic)		VAL (Italy)		Pts
1	(Germany) Dr. Ralph Pütz				3	3	12	9			Ret	WD	46.5
1=	(Switzerland) Urs Rüttimann		WD	WD			15	7	12	12			46.5
Pos	Driver	MON	RBR		SAL		SPA		BRN		VAL		Pts

=== Drexler-Automotive Formula 3 Open ===
Pos	Driver	MON (Italy)		RBR (Austria)		SAL (Austria)		SPA (Belgium)		BRN (Czech Republic)		VAL (Italy)		Pts
1	(Czech Republic) Vladimir Netušil	1	1	3	2	1	1	2	4	1	1			121.5
2	(Italy) Marco Minelli	Ret	DNS					5	3	4	2	1	1	67
2	(Italy) Alesandro Bracalente							1	1					50
4	(Germany) Christian Wachter			4	4	WD	WD	4	2					45
5	(Hungary) Janos Magyar			2	3			Ret	5	3	3			41.5
6	(Serbia) Paolo Brajnik			1	1			WD	WD					25
7	(Hungary) Attila Penzes									3	2			15
Drivers ineligible to score points
-	(Italy) Andrea Benalli							3	6					-
Pos	Driver	MON		RBR		SAL		SPA		BRN		VAL		Pts

=== Swiss Formula 3 Cup ===
Pos	Driver	MON (Italy)		RBR (Austria)		SAL (Austria)	SPA (Belgium)		BRN (Czech Republic)		Pts
1	(Switzerland) Sandro Zeller	1	Ret	1	1		1	1	1	1	175
2	(Switzerland) Thomas Aregger	4	1	2	2		2	2			115
3	(Switzerland) Marcel Tobler			3	3		3	3	3	3	90
4	(Switzerland) Kurt Böhlen						4	4	2	2	60
	(Switzerland) Urs Rüttimann			WD	WD		6	5	5	5	42
5	(Switzerland) Christian Eicke						5	6			18
Pos	Driver	MON		RBR		SAL	SPA		BRN		Pts
