= Sandro Zeller =

Swiss racing driver (born 1991)

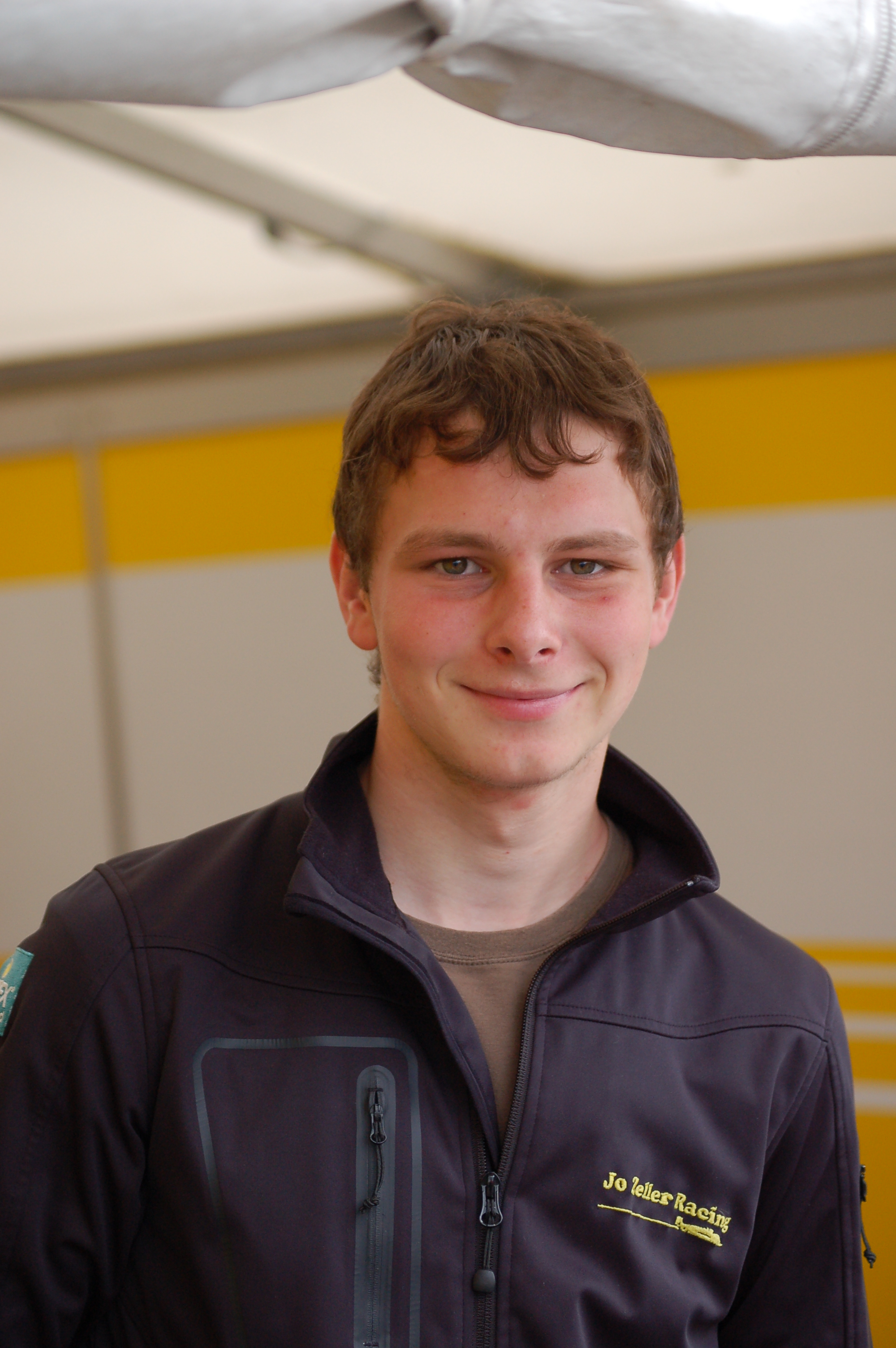
- Sandro Zeller at Zandvoort 2012
- Nationality: (Switzerland) Swiss
- Born: 16 November 1991 (age 34) Uster (Switzerland)
- Relatives: Jo Zeller (father)

FIA European Formula Three Championship career
- Debut season: 2012
- Current team: Jo Zeller Racing
- Car number: 17
- Starts: 77
- Wins: 0
- Poles: 0
- Fastest laps: 0
- Best finish: 27th in 2013 & 2014

Previous series
- 2010-12 2010-11 2010 2008–09: Formula 3 Euro Series; German Formula Three; Austria Formula 3 Cup; Formula Lista Junior

Championship titles
- 2011, 2016-18 2024 2025: Austria Formula 3 Cup; F2000 Italian Formula Trophy - Platinum class F2000 Italian Formula Trophy

Sandro Zeller (born 16 November 1991 in Uster) is a Swiss race car driver. He is son of the twelve-time Swiss Formula Three champion Jo Zeller who founded team Jo Zeller Racing.

== Career ==
=== Karting ===
Zeller made his karting debut in 2006, at the age of fifteen. In first season of the Swiss Rotax Max Challenge Junior he was twelfth, improving to the third place on the next year.

=== Formula Lista Junior ===
Zeller began his car racing career by driving in the Formula Lista Junior with Jo Zeller Racing in 2008. He amassed seventeen points and scored one pol on the way to fourteenth place in the championship standings.

Zeller remained in series for 2009 and improved to fifth place. He took one win at Dijon-Prenois and scored eleven point-scoring positions.

=== Formula Three ===
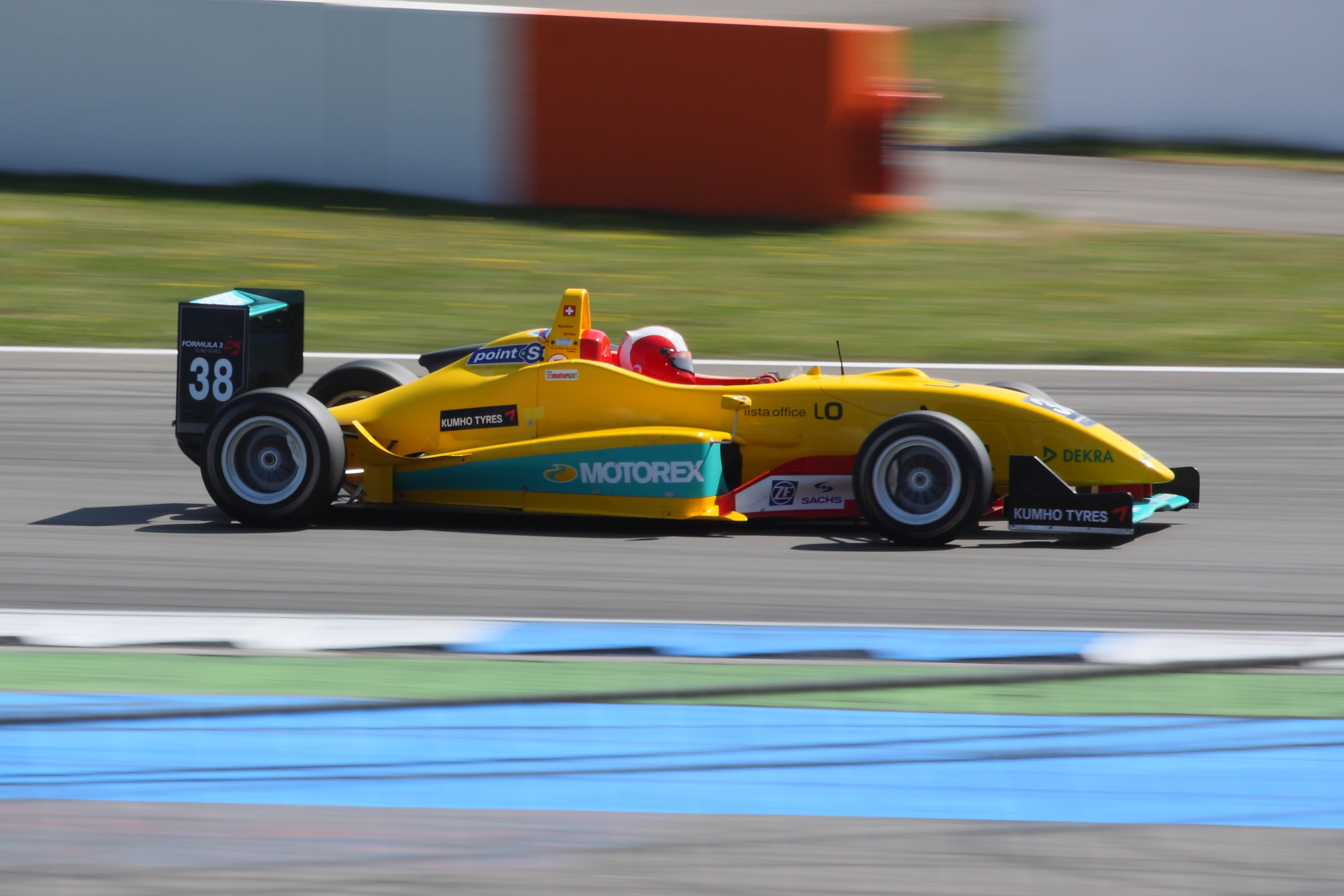
Zeller competing at the second round of the 2010 Formula 3 Euro Series at Hockenheim.

After two races in the final round at Motorsport Arena Oschersleben in 2009, Zeller remained in German Formula Three Championship for 2010. He also competed in the Hockenheimring round of the Austria Formula 3 Cup and Formula 3 Euro Series.

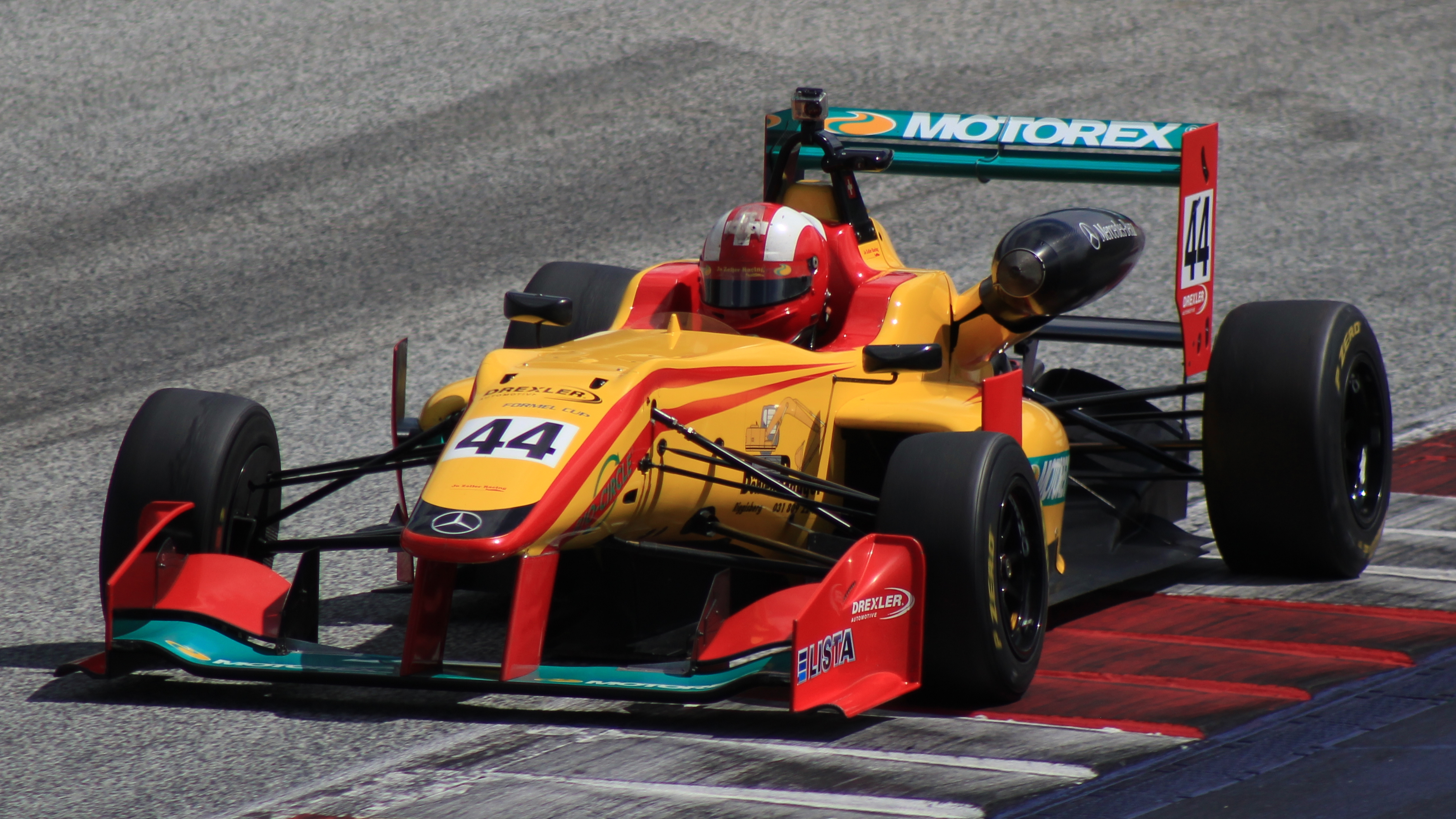
Zeller at the Red Bull Ring in 2024

2011 saw Zeller's best season to date. He won the Austria Formula 3 Cup winning nine races and completed a part season in the German Formula Three Championship and also the Formula 3 Euro Series.

== Racing career ==
=== Career summary ===
Season	Series	Team	Races	Wins	Poles	F/Laps	Podiums	Points	Position
2008	Formula Lista Junior	Jo Zeller Racing	12	0	1	0	0	17	14th
2009	Formula Lista Junior	Jo Zeller Racing	12	1	1	1	4	115	5th
2009	German Formula Three	Jo Zeller Racing	2	0	0	0	0	N/A	NC†
2010	German Formula Three	Jo Zeller Racing	16	0	0	0	0	3	17th
2010	Austria Formula 3 Cup	Jo Zeller Racing	8	3	6	5	6	115	3rd
2010	Formula 3 Euro Series	Jo Zeller Racing	4	0	0	0	0	N/A	NC†
2011	German Formula Three	Jo Zeller Racing	6	0	0	0	0	5	15th
2011	Austria Formula 3 Cup	Jo Zeller Racing	12	9	?	?	12	225	1st
2011	Formula 3 Euro Series	Jo Zeller Racing	9	0	0	0	0	0	NC
2012	Austria Formula 3 Cup	Jo Zeller Racing	10	7	7	7	10	185	2nd
2012	Formula 3 Euro Series	Jo Zeller Racing	24	0	0	0	0	23	12th
2013	FIA European Formula 3 Championship	Jo Zeller Racing	30	0	0	0	0	0	27th
2013	Masters of Formula 3	Jo Zeller Racing	1	0	0	0	0	N/A	17th
2014	FIA European Formula 3 Championship	Jo Zeller Racing	30	0	0	0	0	0	27th
2015	Austria Formula 3 Cup	Jo Zeller Racing	4	1	0	1	3	71	7th
2016	Austria Formula 3 Cup	Jo Zeller Racing	12	9	6	4	11	243	1st
2017	Austria Formula 3 Cup	Jo Zeller Racing	14	9	8	6	13	300	1st
2018	Austria Formula 3 Cup	Jo Zeller Racing	14	13	7	9	13	326	1st
2019	Drexler-Automotive Formula 3 Cup	Jo Zeller Racing	22	16	5	4	20	298	1st
2020	Drexler-Automotive Formula 3 Cup	Jo Zeller Racing	12	11	4	11	11	225	1st
2021	Drexler-Automotive Formula 3 Cup	Jo Zeller Racing	10	5	2	3	8	211	1st
2022	Drexler-Automotive Formula 3 Cup	Jo Zeller Racing	14	14	?	?	14	350	1st
2023	Drexler-Automotive Formula 3 Cup	Jo Zeller Racing	16	2	1	2	12	259	3rd
2023	F2000 Italian Formula Trophy	Jo Zeller Racing	12	1	0	0	7	231	3rd
2024	Drexler-Automotive Formula 3 Cup	Jo Zeller Racing	16	4	1	2	14	269	2nd
2024	F2000 Italian Formula Trophy	Jo Zeller Racing	14	3	0	0	11	239	3rd
2025	Drexler-Automotive Formula 3 Cup	Jo Zeller Racing	14	6	1	3	13	263	1st
2025	F2000 Italian Formula Trophy	Jo Zeller Racing	14	6	0	2	13	284	1st
2026	Austria Formula 3 Cup	Jo Zeller Racing	14	12	10	9	13	302	1st
2026	F2000 Italian Formula Trophy	Jo Zeller Racing	14	12	8	11	13	304	1st

† Guest driver – ineligible for points.

=== Complete Formula 3 Euro Series results ===
(key)

Year	Entrant	Chassis	Engine	1	2	3	4	5	6	7	8	9	10	11	12	13	14	15	16	17	18	19	20	21	22	23	24	25	26	27	DC	Points
2010	Jo Zeller Racing	Dallara F306	Mercedes	LEC; 1	LEC; 2	HOC1; 1; 15	HOC1; 2; 11	VAL; 1	VAL; 2	NOR; 1	NOR; 2	NÜR; 1	NÜR; 2	ZAN; 1	ZAN; 2	BRH; 1	BRH; 2	OSC; 1	OSC; 2	HOC2; 1; 13	HOC2; 2; 10										NC	0 †
2011	Jo Zeller Racing	Dallara F308	Mercedes	LEC; 1	LEC; 2	LEC; 3	HOC1; 1; 13	HOC1; 2; 15	HOC1; 3; 13	ZAN; 1	ZAN; 2	ZAN; 3	RBR; 1	RBR; 2	RBR; 3	NOR; 1 Ret	NOR; 2; 9	NOR; 3; 9	NÜR; 1	NÜR; 2	NÜR; 3	SIL; 1	SIL; 2	SIL; 3	VAL; 1	VAL; 2	VAL; 3	HOC2; 1; 11	HOC2; 2; 12	HOC2; 3; 10	NC	0 †
2012	Jo Zeller Racing	Dallara F308	Mercedes	HOC1; 1; 12	HOC1; 2; 15	HOC1; 3; 10	BSH; 1; 13	BSH; 2; 17	BSH; 3; 14	RBR; 1; 15	RBR; 2; 12	RBR; 3; 9	NOR; 1; 11	NOR; 2; 12	NOR; 3; 23	NÜR; 1; 16	NÜR; 2; 16	NÜR; 3; 9	ZAN; 1; 12	ZAN; 2; 10	ZAN; 3; 9	VAL; 1; 12	VAL; 2; 13	VAL; 3; 11	HOC2; 1; 15	HOC2; 2; 16	HOC2; 3; 14				12th	23

† – As Zeller was a guest driver, he was ineligible for points.

Sporting positions
Preceded by Philippe Chuard	Austria Formula 3 Cup champion 2011	Succeeded by André Rudersdorf
Preceded by Jordi Weckx	Austria Formula 3 Cup champion 2016–18	Succeeded by Incumbent
