= 2025 F2000 Italian Formula Trophy =

Motor racing championship

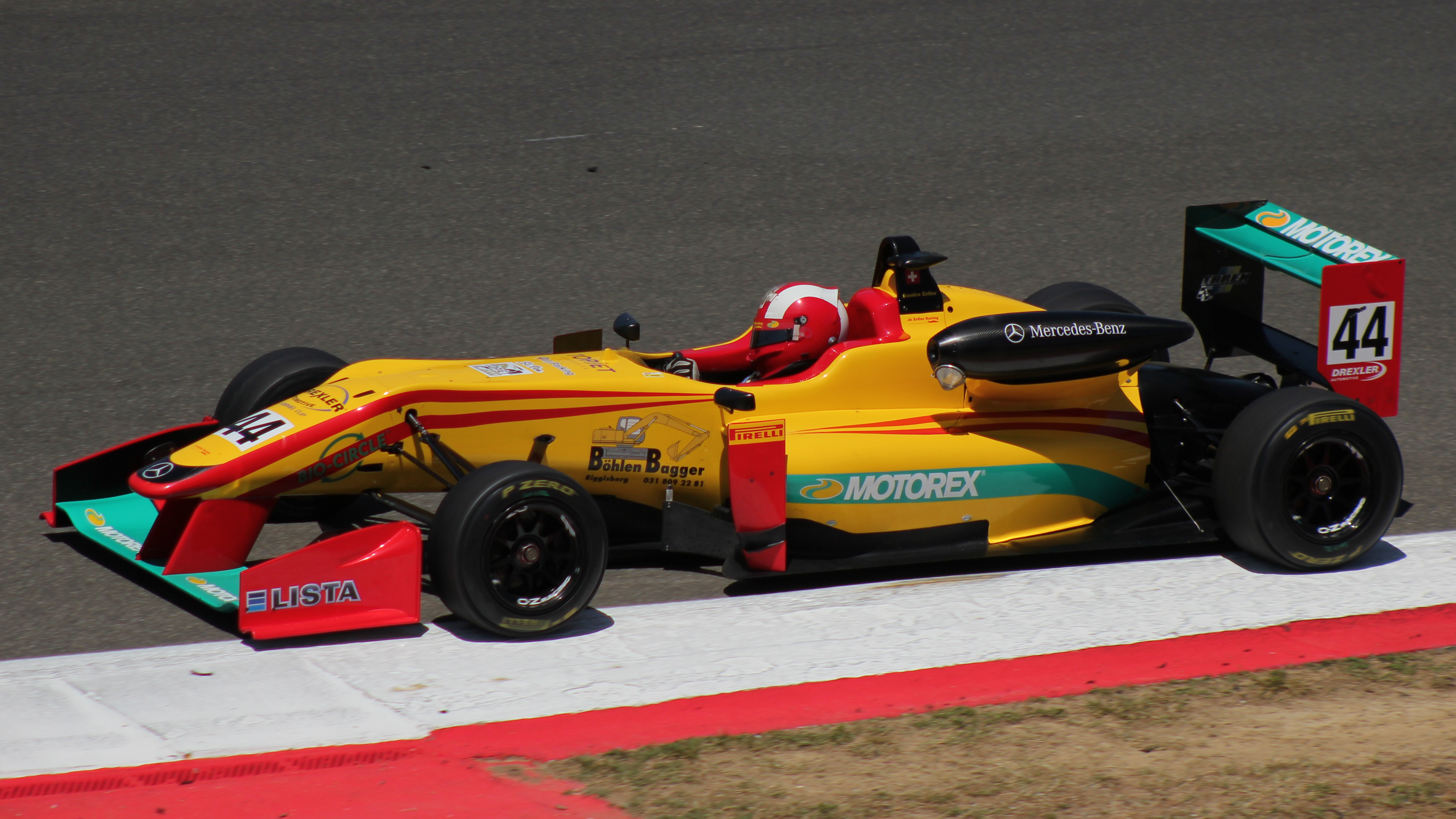
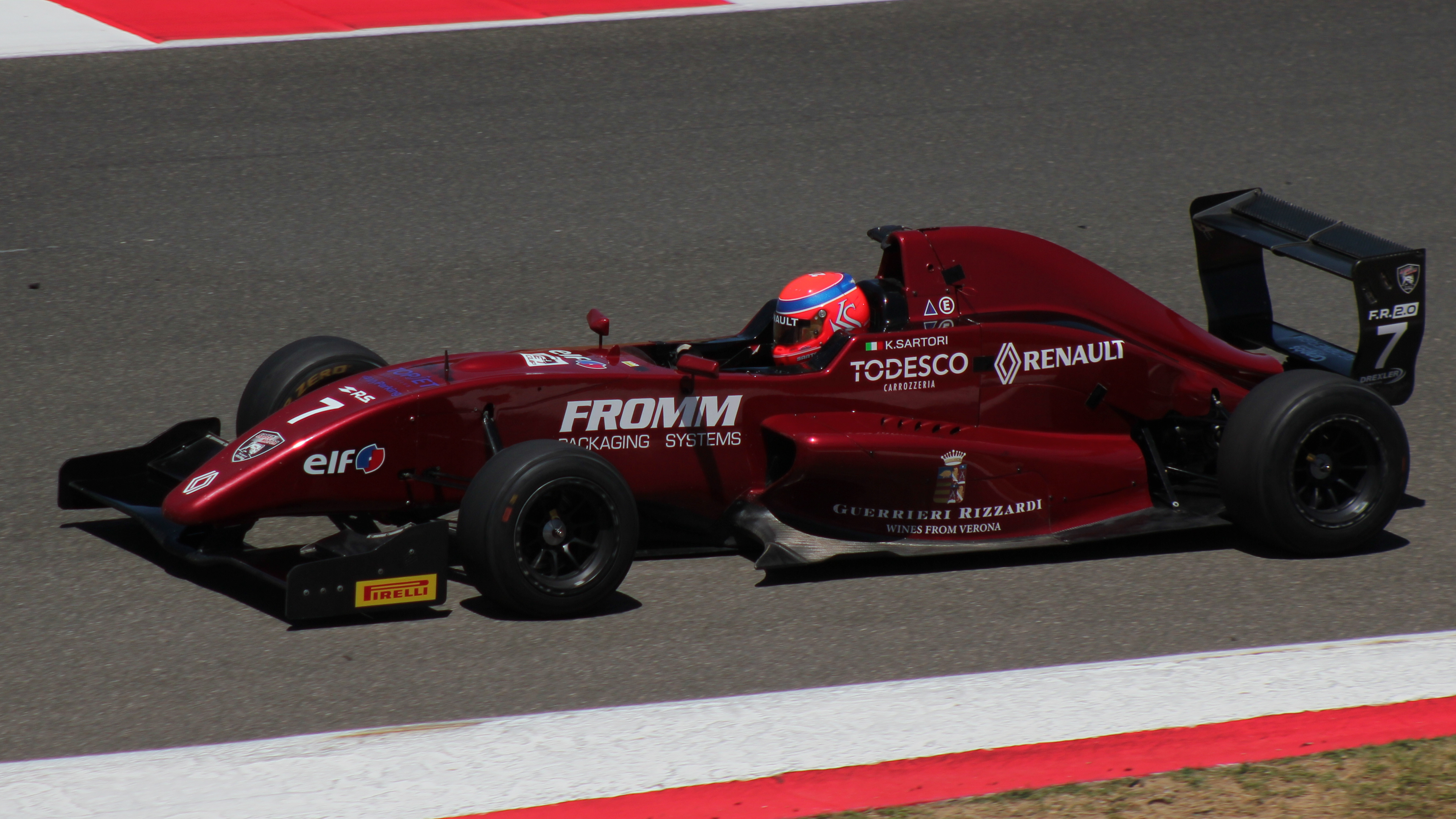
Jo Zeller Racing driver Sandro Zeller (top) won the F2000 Italian Formula Trophy for the first time, while Speed Motor's Karim Sartori (bottom) won the F2.0 Cup title.

The 2025 TopJet F2000 Italian Formula Trophy was a multi-event open-wheel single seater motor racing championship. This was the twelfth season of the series, featuring a mix of professional and amateur drivers competing in different classes and using multiple kinds of Formula 3-, Formula Regional-. Formula Renault- and Formula 4-level machinery.

The championship continued its cooperation with the Drexler-Automotive Formula Cup, with the two series sharing grids and race slots on multiple race weekends.

Jo Zeller Racing's Sandro Zeller won the overall F2000 Championship and in doing so also became Platinum Class Champion. Franz Wöss Racing's defending champion Benjámin Berta secured the Super Formula Class title as Nannini Racing's Davide Pedetti won in the Gold Class, Facondini Racing's Oliver Kratsch claimed the title in the Silver Class, STAC driver Jérémy Clavaud became the inaugural Formula Regional Class Champion and Matteo Zoccali won the Entry Level Class driving for the Henry Morrogh Drivers School. Franz Wöss Racing defended their F2000 Teams' Championship title.

In the F2.0 Cup, Speed Motor's Karim Sartori took the overall title as well as the Open Class title as his team claimed the F2.0 Teams' Championship. Neri Autosport's Bruno Mottez meanwhile won the title in the Light Class.

== Teams and drivers ==
Teams and drivers competing in the F2000 Trophy were divided into six classes: the Super Formula Class was open to Dallara F320 cars, while the Platinum, Gold and Silver Classes were open to other older F3 cars. The Bronze class was discontinued, while a new Formula Regional Class for cars conforming to these regulations was introduced. The Formula Entry Class lastly was open to Formula 4 cars. For competition in the F2.0 Cup, the field was divided into Pro and Light Class entries.

=== F2000 Trophy entries ===
Team	No.	Driver	Car	Engine	Status	Rounds
Super Formula Class entries
(Austria) Franz Wöss Racing	1	(Hungary) Benjámin Berta	Dallara F320	Mercedes		All
(Austria) Franz Wöss Racing	20	(Denmark) Stig Larsen	Dallara F320	Mercedes HWA		All
(Austria) Franz Wöss Racing	21	(Austria) Ludwig Kronawitter	Dallara F320			5
(Austria) Franz Wöss Racing	32	(Poland) Victor Smialek	Dallara F320			7
(Italy) Puresport	8	(Italy) Dino Rasero	Dallara F320	Mercedes HWA		All
Formula Regional Class entries
(France) Neri Autosport	10	(Italy) Luca Iannacone	Formula Regional			5–7
(France) Neri Autosport	30	(France) Sebastien Banchereau	Formula Regional	Renault		1–2, 6
(France) Neri Autosport	95	(France) Arthur Fouche	Formula Regional			4
(Italy) Puresport	12	(Switzerland) Christof Ledermann	Formula Regional	Alfa Romeo		1–3, 5–6
(Italy) Puresport	16	(Italy) Sara Fruncillo	Formula Regional	Alfa Romeo		1
(Italy) Puresport	25	(Italy) Mattia Bagioni	Formula Regional	Alfa Romeo		1, 7
(Italy) Alpha Team Racing	33	(Italy) Sandro de Virgilis	Formula Regional	Renault		1
(Italy) ASD Ruote Scoperte M.	38	(Italy) Andrea Masci	Formula Regional	Renault		1
(France) STAC	91	(France) Jérémy Clavaud	Formula Regional	Renault		1–4, 6
Platinum Class entries
(Italy) Viola Formula Racing	2	(Italy) Laurence Balestrini	Dallara F317	Volkswagen		1–2, 4
(Italy) Viola Formula Racing	14	(Italy) Andrea Benalli	Dallara F317	Mercedes HWA		All
(Switzerland) Jo Zeller Racing	44	(Switzerland) Sandro Zeller	Dallara F312	Mercedes HWA		All
(Italy) Perego Racing	46	(Italy) Riccardo Perego	Dallara F317	Volkswagen		1
(Italy) One Competition	70	(Italy) Enzo Stentella	Dallara F317	Volkswagen		All
(Italy) Facondini Racing	88	(Italy) Francesco Solfaroli	Dallara F317	Toyota		3, 6–7
Gold Class entries
(Switzerland) Jo Zeller Racing	4	(Switzerland) Urs Rüttimann	Dallara F306			4
(Italy) Facondini Racing	6	(Italy) Enrico Milani	Dallara F308	Fiat FTP		3, 5–7
(Germany) Team Hoffmann Racing	22	(Germany) Andre Petropoulos	Dallara F316	Opel Spiess		2, 5–7
(Italy) ASD Autodromos - Nannini Racing	42	(Italy) Davide Pedetti	Dallara F317	Toyota		1–3, 6–7
(Italy) ASD Autodromos - Nannini Racing	42	(Italy) Giancarlo Pedetti	Dallara F316			4
(Czech Republic) Chabr Motorsport	54	(Czech Republic) Tomas Chabr	Dallara F317			7
privateer	90	(Italy) Antonio Marco Rinaldi	Dallara F393			6
(Italy) Team Perodi	92	(Italy) Romano Cataldo	Dallara F316	Toyota		1–3, 6
(Italy) Corbetta Racing	93	(Italy) Antonio Montruccoli	Dallara F312	Mercedes HWA		1–3
(Italy) Antonino Racing	777	(Italy) Antonino Pellegrino	Dallara F312			6–7
Silver Class entries
privateer	5	(Austria) Michael Aberer	Dallara F308			7
(France) Neri Autosport	10	(Italy) Luca Iannacone	Dallara F311	Fiat FTP		1–2
(Italy) Twister Corse	13	(Italy) Sergio Terrini	Dallara F308	Fiat FTP		1
(Italy) Giordano Motorsport	21	(Italy) Umberto Vaglio	Dallara F308	Fiat FTP		1, 4, 6–7
(France) Sud Motorsport	22	(Italy) Giuseppe Marinaro	Dallara F310			6
(Italy) One Competition	23	(Italy) Federico Porri	Dallara F308			3, 7
(Italy) Bellspeed	27	(Italy) Patrick Bellezza	Dallara F300	Fiat Novamotor		1, 7
(Italy) Facondini Racing	96	(Germany) Oliver Kratsch	Dallara F308	Toyota		1, 3–7
Formula Entry Class entries
(United States) Scuderia Buell	27	(United States) Rafał Wołosz	Tatuus F4-T014			4
(Italy) G Motorsport	31	(Italy) Federico Antonioli	Tatuus F4-T014			3
(Italy) ASD Ruote Scoperte M.	34	(Italy) Sergio Conti	Tatuus F4-T014	Abarth		1
(Italy) Henry Morrogh Drivers School	37	(Italy) Matteo Zoccali	Tatuus F4-T014			6–7

=== F2.0 Cup entries ===
All drivers competed driving Tatuus FFR.0 cars with Renault engines.

Team	No.	Driver	Rounds
Light Class entries
(Italy) G Motorsport	19	(Italy) Vito di Bello	7
(France) Neri Autosport	23	(France) Bruno Mottez	2, 6–7
(Italy) Derva Corse	24	(Italy) Marco de Toffol	1
(France) Neri Autosport	24	(France) Wilfried Leroy	4
(Italy) Valdelsa Classic Motor Club	59	(Italy) Riccardo Rossi	1, 7
(Italy) ASD Ruote Scoperte M.	79	(Italy) Fabio Turchetto	1, 7
(Austria) Franz Wöss Racing	95	(Germany) Nicolas Löffler	5, 7
Open Class entries
(Austria) Geier Racing	4	(Austria) Alexander Geier	7
(Italy) Speed Motor	7	(Italy) Karim Sartori	1–4, 6–7
(Italy) GTM Motorsport	18	(Italy) Domenico Terron	1–4
(Italy) Team Perodi	19	(Italy) Vincenzo Siciliano	1–2
(France) Morel Auto Racing	24	(France) Tristan Morel	2
(Italy) Viola Formula Racing	26	(Portugal) Luis Aguiar	1–4
(France) Team Ziffel	31	(France) Sarene Ziffel	5, 7
(Switzerland) Jo Zeller Racing	717	(Switzerland) Roger Bucher	4

== Race calendar ==
The 2025 calendar was announced in late 2024. The series again only held a single round abroad, but that venue will change from the Red Bull Ring to the Brno Circuit.

Race weekend will hold races of the FR2.0 Cup

Round		Circuit	Date	Support bill	Map of circuit locations
1	SR	(Italy) Monza Circuit, Monza	12 April	Monza Historic; Campionato Italiano Auto Storiche	2025 F2000 Italian Formula Trophy is located in Europe
1	FR	(Italy) Monza Circuit, Monza	13 April	Monza Historic; Campionato Italiano Auto Storiche	2025 F2000 Italian Formula Trophy is located in Europe
2	SR	(Italy) Mugello Circuit, Scarperia e San Piero	10 May	Campionato Italiano Auto Storiche; AvD Sports Car Challenge	2025 F2000 Italian Formula Trophy is located in Europe
2	FR	(Italy) Mugello Circuit, Scarperia e San Piero	11 May	Campionato Italiano Auto Storiche; AvD Sports Car Challenge	2025 F2000 Italian Formula Trophy is located in Europe
3	SR	(Italy) Vallelunga Circuit, Campagnano di Roma	7 June	Porsche Carrera Cup Italy; Italian Sport Prototype Championship	2025 F2000 Italian Formula Trophy is located in Europe
3	FR	(Italy) Vallelunga Circuit, Campagnano di Roma	8 June	Porsche Carrera Cup Italy; Italian Sport Prototype Championship	2025 F2000 Italian Formula Trophy is located in Europe
4	SR	(Italy) Mugello Circuit, Scarperia e San Piero	12 July	Italian GT Championship; Italian F4 Championship	2025 F2000 Italian Formula Trophy is located in Europe
4	FR	(Italy) Mugello Circuit, Scarperia e San Piero	13 July	Italian GT Championship; Italian F4 Championship	2025 F2000 Italian Formula Trophy is located in Europe
5	SR	(Czech Republic) Brno Circuit, Brno	6 September	ESET Cup Series; Formula 4 CEZ Championship	2025 F2000 Italian Formula Trophy is located in Europe
5	FR	(Czech Republic) Brno Circuit, Brno	7 September	ESET Cup Series; Formula 4 CEZ Championship	2025 F2000 Italian Formula Trophy is located in Europe
6	SR	(Italy) Imola Circuit, Imola	27 September	Porsche Carrera Cup Italy; Italian GT Championship	2025 F2000 Italian Formula Trophy is located in Europe
6	FR	(Italy) Imola Circuit, Imola	28 September	Porsche Carrera Cup Italy; Italian GT Championship	2025 F2000 Italian Formula Trophy is located in Europe
7	SR	(Italy) Misano World Circuit Marco Simoncelli, Misano Adriatico	26 October	Campionato Italiano Auto Storiche; Historic Grand Prix Car Association	2025 F2000 Italian Formula Trophy is located in Europe
7	FR	(Italy) Misano World Circuit Marco Simoncelli, Misano Adriatico	26 October	Campionato Italiano Auto Storiche; Historic Grand Prix Car Association	2025 F2000 Italian Formula Trophy is located in Europe

== Race results ==
=== F2000 Trophy results ===
Round		Circuit	Pole position	Super Formula winner	Formula Regional winner	Platinum winner	Gold winner	Silver winner	Formula Entry winner
1	SR	(Italy) Monza Circuit		(Hungary) Benjámin Berta	(France) Jérémy Clavaud	(Switzerland) Sandro Zeller	(Italy) Romano Cataldo	(Germany) Oliver Kratsch	no starters
1	FR	(Italy) Monza Circuit	(Hungary) Benjámin Berta	(Hungary) Benjámin Berta	(France) Jérémy Clavaud	(Switzerland) Sandro Zeller	(Italy) Romano Cataldo	(Germany) Oliver Kratsch	no starters
2	SR	(Italy) Mugello Circuit		(Hungary) Benjámin Berta	(France) Jérémy Clavaud	(Switzerland) Sandro Zeller	(Italy) Davide Pedetti	(Italy) Luca Iannacone	no entries
2	FR	(Italy) Mugello Circuit	(Hungary) Benjámin Berta	(Denmark) Stig Larsen	(France) Jérémy Clavaud	(Italy) Andrea Benalli	(Italy) Davide Pedetti	(Italy) Luca Iannacone	no entries
3	SR	(Italy) Vallelunga Circuit		(Hungary) Benjámin Berta	(France) Jérémy Clavaud	(Switzerland) Sandro Zeller	(Italy) Enrico Milani	(Germany) Oliver Kratsch	no starters
3	FR	(Italy) Vallelunga Circuit	(Hungary) Benjámin Berta	(Hungary) Benjámin Berta	(France) Jérémy Clavaud	(Switzerland) Sandro Zeller	(Italy) Davide Pedetti	(Germany) Oliver Kratsch	no starters
4	SR	(Italy) Mugello Circuit		(Hungary) Benjámin Berta	(France) Jérémy Clavaud	(Switzerland) Sandro Zeller	(Switzerland) Urs Rüttimann	(Germany) Oliver Kratsch	(United States) Rafał Wołosz
4	FR	(Italy) Mugello Circuit	(Hungary) Benjámin Berta	(Hungary) Benjámin Berta	(France) Jérémy Clavaud	(Switzerland) Sandro Zeller	(Switzerland) Urs Rüttimann	(Germany) Oliver Kratsch	(United States) Rafał Wołosz
5	SR	(Czech Republic) Brno Circuit	(Hungary) Benjámin Berta	(Hungary) Benjámin Berta	(Switzerland) Christof Ledermann	(Switzerland) Sandro Zeller	(Germany) Andre Petropoulos	(Germany) Oliver Kratsch	no entries
5	FR	(Czech Republic) Brno Circuit	(Hungary) Benjámin Berta	(Hungary) Benjámin Berta	(Switzerland) Christof Ledermann	(Switzerland) Sandro Zeller	(Germany) Andre Petropoulos	(Germany) Oliver Kratsch	no entries
6	SR	(Italy) Imola Circuit		(Hungary) Benjámin Berta	(France) Sebastien Banchereau	(Switzerland) Sandro Zeller	(Italy) Enrico Milani	(Italy) Giuseppe Marinaro	(Italy) Matteo Zoccali
6	FR	(Italy) Imola Circuit	(Hungary) Benjámin Berta	(Hungary) Benjámin Berta	(France) Jérémy Clavaud	(Switzerland) Sandro Zeller	(Germany) Andre Petropoulos	(Germany) Oliver Kratsch	(Italy) Matteo Zoccali
7	SR	(Italy) Misano Circuit		(Poland) Victor Smialek	(Italy) Mattia Bagioni	(Switzerland) Sandro Zeller	(Germany) Andre Petropoulos	(Germany) Oliver Kratsch	(Italy) Matteo Zoccali
7	FR	(Italy) Misano Circuit	(Poland) Victor Smialek	(Poland) Victor Smialek	(Italy) Mattia Bagioni	(Switzerland) Sandro Zeller	(Germany) Andre Petropoulos	(Germany) Oliver Kratsch	no finishers

=== F2.0 Cup results ===
Round		Circuit	Pole position	Light Class winner	Open Class winner
1	SR	(Italy) Monza Circuit		(Italy) Fabio Turchetto	(Portugal) Luis Aguiar
1	FR	(Italy) Monza Circuit	(Portugal) Luis Aguiar	(Italy) Fabio Turchetto	(Portugal) Luis Aguiar
2	SR	(Italy) Mugello Circuit		(France) Bruno Mottez	(Portugal) Luis Aguiar
2	FR	(Italy) Mugello Circuit	(Portugal) Luis Aguiar	(France) Bruno Mottez	(Portugal) Luis Aguiar
3	SR	(Italy) Vallelunga Circuit		no entries	(Italy) Karim Sartori
3	FR	(Italy) Vallelunga Circuit	(Italy) Karim Sartori	no entries	(Italy) Karim Sartori
4	SR	(Italy) Mugello Circuit		(France) Wilfried Leroy	(Italy) Karim Sartori
4	FR	(Italy) Mugello Circuit	(Italy) Karim Sartori	(France) Wilfried Leroy	(Italy) Karim Sartori
5	SR	(Italy) Imola Circuit		(France) Bruno Mottez	(Italy) Karim Sartori
5	FR	(Italy) Imola Circuit	(Italy) Karim Sartori	(France) Bruno Mottez	(Italy) Karim Sartori
6	SR	(Italy) Misano Circuit		(Italy) Fabio Turchetto	(Italy) Karim Sartori
6	FR	(Italy) Misano Circuit	(Italy) Karim Sartori	(Germany) Nicolas Löffler	(Italy) Karim Sartori

== Season report ==
=== First half ===
The 2025 season began at Monza with defending champion Benjámin Berta claiming pole position for Franz Wöss Racing in qualifying. That saw him start eighth for the opening sprint race, in which he quickly rose to second place, but found no way past Jo Zeller Racing's Sandro Zeller. Viola Formula's Andrea Benalli took third as his teammate Luis Aguiar claimed the win in F2.0 on his debut in the series. Berta bounced back in the feature race, delivering a commanding performance in wet conditions to lead Zeller and STAC's Jérémy Clavaud lights-to-flag and take the championship lead. Aguiar took another win in the F2.0 Cup to cement an early lead over Speed Motor's Karim Sartori.

Qualifying for round two at Mugello saw Berta on top once again. He only needed one lap to claim the lead from eighth on the grid in the reversed-grid sprint race, leading Zeller and teammate Stig Larsen to an unchallenged victory as Aguiar also extended his winning streak in the F2.0 Cup. The feature race began with contact between Berta and Zeller, with the former retiring and the latter penalized. That left Benalli leading Nannini's Davide Pedetti and Team Hoffmann's Andre Petropoulos, taking the win in a race further interrupted by a red flag after multiple collisions. The picture in the F2.0 Cup was untroubled by the shake-up in the overall order, with Aguiar claiming his fourth win in a row.

Vallelunga hosted round three, and Berta continued his unbeaten streak in qualifying. His rise to the front in the sprint race was interrupted by a safety car, but when it was withdrawn, Berta and Zeller both attacked race leader Clavaud. Berta claimed the victory ahead of Zeller, with Larsen third. In F2.0, a qualifying accident for Aguiar forced him to miss the race, with Sartori claiming the win. The feature race brought a race-long battle between Zeller and Berta, with both leading at different stages before the Swiss came out in front to shorten the Hungarian's championship lead to only seven points. Petropoulos took third, while Sartori led Aguiar in F2.0, closing up further to the Portuguese.

The series returned to Mugello four round four, and Berta claimed another pole position. Zeller got a brilliant start to the sprint race to take the lead right away, with Berta taking longer to move through the field. That allowed Zeller to build a gap, and Berta was unable to challenge him for the victory. Larsen took another podium in third as the title battle in F2.0 heated up when Aguiar retired in the gravel and Sartori won the race. Zeller took the lead of the feature race for a single corner, before Berta got back in front and controlled the rest of the race as Benalli completed the podium. Sartori led Aguiar in F2.0 to take his fourth win in a row and with it the championship lead in the F2.0 Cup.

=== Second half ===
Round five saw the series' debut at Brno Circuit. Contrary to the other events, a separate qualifying session was held for the sprint race, in which Berta continued his pole position streak. Wet conditions saw the sprint race start under safety car conditions, but when racing got underway, Berta managed the race ahead of Zeller and Benalli to take a largely unchallenged victory. Berta doubled up in the second qualifying session to take another pole position, followed by an equally dominant display in the feature race. Leading Zeller and Benalli once again, untroubled by a mid-race safety car, Berta was able to sweep the weekend and significantly bolster his championship lead.

The penultimate round was held at Imola Circuit, where Berta claimed his seventh pole position of the season. The sprint race began with a multi-car crash that caused a safety car, and Zeller pounced on the restart to take a race lead he would not relinquish, despite Berta's best efforts. Benalli continued his podium streak in third, while the F2.0 Cup was back in action, albeit with only two cars, and Sartori won the race. Zeller doubled down in the feature race, taking a hard-fought win after a race-long battle with Berta to keep the title fight close heading into the final round. Sartori was victorious once again in F2.0 and the absence of his closest rival Aguiar saw him seal the title a round early.

The Misano Circuit hosted the season final, where Franz Wöss Racing's Victor Smialek denied Berta a full-season qualifying sweep. Berta started the sprint race in usual fashion by rising from seventh to the lead in one lap, but then slowed with a technical issue. He was classified 27th at the finish, while Zeller won ahead of Smialek and Benalli to set up a championship-deciding final race. That decision would not come on track, however, as Berta again had car issues and was forced to retire. Zeller was therefore able to finish second behind Smialek to claim the title as Facondini Racing's Oliver Kratsch took third. F2.0 Champion Sartori meanwhile ended his season with two more wins.

Almost nothing separated Zeller and Berta for much of the season. Both were in a league of their own, often dispatching the other cars put in front of them by the newly created reversed-grid sprint races in a matter of a few corners. They took six victories each, but a crucial final round saw Zeller come out on top in the end. With Berta denied back-to-back championship titles by no fault of his own, Zeller claimed his inaugural F2000 Italian Formula Trophy title without an on-track battle in the final, a matter which he regretted afterwards, before highlighting the consistency of both drivers that played part in the close year-long championship fight.

== Standings ==
=== Scoring system ===
Drivers scored points in the overall standings, as well as in separate standings per class. Five points were awarded to each driver attending an event. Claiming the fastest lap per race per class awarded a point if at least three cars took part in that class.

The scoring system was overhauled in 2025: The shorter first race of each weekend was designated as the Sprint Race, and finishing drivers scored the following points:

Position	1st	2nd	3rd	4th	5th	6th	7th	8th	9th	10th
Points	20	16	13	11	9	7	5	3	2	1

The second race of each weekend, called the Feature Race, awarded more points:

Position	1st	2nd	3rd	4th	5th	6th	7th	8th	9th	10th
Points	30	23	18	14	11	9	7	5	3	1

The final score was formed by counting each drivers' five best sprint race scores, six best feature race scores as well as the attendance points for all race weekends.

=== Drivers' standings ===
==== Overall standings ====
Pos	Driver	MNZ (Italy)		MUG1 (Italy)		VLL (Italy)		MUG2 (Italy)		BRN (Czech Republic)		IMO (Italy)		MIS (Italy)		Pts
Pos	Driver	SR	FR	SR	FR	SR	FR	SR	FR	SR	FR	SR	FR	SR	FR	Pts
1	(Switzerland) Sandro Zeller	1	2	(2)	(11)	(2)	1	1	2	2	2	1	1	1	2	284
2	(Hungary) Benjámin Berta	(2)	**1**	1	**Ret**	1	**2**	2	**1**	**1**	**1**	2	**2**	(27)	(Ret)	266
3	(Italy) Andrea Benalli	3	(18)	(4)	1	4	3	(5)	3	3	3	3	3	3	4	214
4	(Italy) Dino Rasero	6	6	6	(Ret)	(Ret)	7	6	5	4	5	6	5	(7)	7	130
5	(Denmark) Stig Larsen	4	10	3	4	3	13	3	17	5	6	(Ret)	(20)	(6)	6	129
6	(Italy) Enzo Stentella	5	7	5	(Ret)	(10)	4	4	4	6	4	(8)	8	8	11	127
7	(Germany) Oliver Kratsch	(12)	5			5	6	7	7	8	8	5	6	4	3	126
8	(Germany) Andre Petropoulos			8	3					7	7	Ret	4	5	5	87
9	(France) Jérémy Clavaud	7	3	9	5	12	5	10	8			Ret	7			85
10	(Italy) Davide Pedetti	15	15	7	2	Ret	9					15	10	10	12	58
11	(Italy) Karim Sartori	(11)	9	11	7	8	8	11	9			11	9	11	9	57
12	(Poland) Victor Smialek													2	**1**	53
13	(Portugal) Luis Aguiar	9	4	10	6	DNS	11	Ret	12							41
14	(Switzerland) Christof Ledermann	13	11	13	9	Ret	10			10	9	12	15			33
15	(Italy) Enrico Milani					7	Ret			9	Ret	10	11	9	24	30
16	(Italy) Francesco Solfaroli					6	DNS					9	12	12	10	25
17	(Italy) Romano Cataldo	14	14	14	8	Ret	12					13	13			25
18	(Italy) Mattia Bagioni	10	8											14	8	21
19	(Italy) Luca Iannacone	WD	WD	15	13					13	13	17	17	23	23	20
20	(Italy) Umberto Vaglio	DNS	16					16	DNS			20	16	29	25	20
21	(Italy) Laurence Balestrini	DNS	12	17	10			9	11							18
22	(Switzerland) Urs Rüttimann							8	6							17
23	(Italy) Giuseppe Marinaro											4	Ret			16
24	(France) Sebastien Banchereau	WD	WD	12	17							7	DNS			15
25	(Italy) Domenico Terron	19	Ret	18	14	11	14	WD	WD							15
26	(France) Bruno Mottez			20	16							18	18	28	Ret	15
27	(Italy) Federico Porri					9	Ret							17	14	12
28	(France) Sarene Ziffel									12	10			22	13	11
29	(Germany) Nicolas Löffler									14	12			20	18	10
30	(Italy) Antonino Pellegrino											14	14	13	DNS	10
31	(Italy) Fabio Turchetto	16	13											19	19	10
32	(Italy) Vincenzo Siciliano	20	20	19	15											10
33	(Italy) Matteo Zoccali											19	19	26	Ret	10
34	(Italy) Riccardo Rossi	21	19											25	20	10
35	(Italy) Riccardo Perego	8	Ret													8
36	(Italy) Giancarlo Pedetti							12	10							6
37	(Austria) Ludwig Kronawitter									11	11					5
38	(France) Tristan Morel			16	12											5
39	(France) Arthur Fouche							13	13							5
40	(France) Wilfried Leroy							14	16							5
41	(Switzerland) Roger Bucher							17	14							5
42	(United States) Rafał Wołosz							15	15							5
43	(Czech Republic) Tomas Chabr													15	21	5
=	(Austria) Alexander Geier													21	15	5
45	(Italy) Patrick Bellezza	WD	WD											16	17	5
46	(Austria) Michael Aberer													18	16	5
47	(Italy) Antonio Marco Rinaldi											16	DNS			5
48	(Italy) Andrea Masci	17	DNS													5
=	(Italy) Sandro de Virgilis	Ret	17													5
50	(Italy) Antonio Montruccoli	18	21	WD	WD	WD	WD									5
51	(Italy) Vito di Bello													24	22	5
52	(Italy) Sara Fruncillo	22	Ret													5
—	(Italy) Sergio Terrini	WD	WD													0
—	(Italy) Sergio Conti	WD	WD													0
—	(Italy) Marco de Toffol	WD	WD													0
—	(Italy) Federico Antonioli					WD	WD									0
Pos	Driver	SR	FR	SR	FR	SR	FR	SR	FR	SR	FR	SR	FR	SR	FR	Pts
Pos	Driver	MNZ (Italy)		MUG1 (Italy)		VLL (Italy)		MUG2 (Italy)		BRN (Czech Republic)		IMO (Italy)		MIS (Italy)		Pts

Key
Colour	Result
Gold	Winner
Silver	Second place
Bronze	Third place
Green	Other points position
Blue	Other classified position
Blue	Not classified, finished (NC)
Purple	Not classified, retired (Ret)
Red	Did not qualify (DNQ)
Red	Did not pre-qualify (DNPQ)
Black	Disqualified (DSQ)
White	Did not start (DNS)
White	Race cancelled (C)
Blank	Did not practice (DNP)
Blank	Excluded (EX)
Blank	Did not arrive (DNA)
Blank	Withdrawn (WD)
Blank	Did not enter (cell empty)
Text formatting	Meaning
**Bold**	Pole position
Italics	Fastest lap

==== F2000 standings per class ====
Pos	Driver	MNZ (Italy)		MUG1 (Italy)		VLL (Italy)		MUG2 (Italy)		BRN (Czech Republic)		IMO (Italy)		MIS (Italy)		Pts
Pos	Driver	SR	FR	SR	FR	SR	FR	SR	FR	SR	FR	SR	FR	SR	FR	Pts
Super Formula Class
1	(Hungary) Benjámin Berta	(1)	1	1	**Ret**	1	**1**	1	**1**	1	**1**	1	**1**	(4)	(Ret)	295
2	(Denmark) Stig Larsen	2	(3)	2	1	2	3	2	3	(3)	3	(Ret)	3	2	2	241
3	(Italy) Dino Rasero	(3)	2	3	(Ret)	(Ret)	2	3	2	2	2	2	2	3	3	239
4	(Poland) Victor Smialek													1	**1**	57
5	(Austria) Ludwig Kronawitter									4	4					30
Formula Regional Class
1	(France) Jérémy Clavaud	1	1	1	1	1	1	1	1			Ret	1			260
2	(Switzerland) Christof Ledermann	3	3	3	2	Ret	2			1	1	2	2			193
3	(Italy) Luca Iannacone									2	2	3	3	2	2	124
4	(Italy) Mattia Bagioni	2	2											1	1	99
5	(France) Sebastien Banchereau	WD	WD	2	3							1	DNS			65
6	(France) Arthur Fouche							2	2							44
7	(Italy) Sandro de Virgilis	Ret	4													19
8	(Italy) Andrea Masci	4	DNS													16
9	(Italy) Sara Fruncillo	5	Ret													14
Platinum Class
1	(Switzerland) Sandro Zeller	(1)	(1)	1	(3)	1	1	1	1	1	1	1	1	1	1	326
2	(Italy) Andrea Benalli	(2)	(4)	2	1	2	2	(3)	2	2	2	2	2	2	2	260
3	(Italy) Enzo Stentella	(3)	2	3	(Ret)	(4)	3	2	3	3	3	3	3	3	4	212
4	(Italy) Laurence Balestrini	DNS	3	4	2			4	4							92
5	(Italy) Francesco Solfaroli					3	DNS					4	4	4	3	82
6	(Italy) Riccardo Perego	4	Ret													16
Gold Class
1	(Italy) Davide Pedetti	2	2	1	1	Ret	1					4	2	3	2	214
2	(Germany) Andre Petropoulos			2	2					1	1	Ret	1	1	1	192
3	(Italy) Romano Cataldo	1	1	3	3	Ret	2					2	3			158
4	(Italy) Enrico Milani					1	Ret			2	Ret	1	5	2	4	119
5	(Switzerland) Urs Rüttimann							1	1							55
6	(Italy) Antonino Pellegrino											3	4	4	DNS	48
7	(Italy) Giancarlo Pedetti							2	2							44
8	(Italy) Antonio Montruccoli	3	3	WD	WD	WD	WD									36
9	(Czech Republic) Tomas Chabr													5	3	32
10	(Italy) Antonio Marco Rinaldi											5	DNS			14
Silver Class
1	(Germany) Oliver Kratsch	1	1			1	1	1	1	1	1	(2)	1	1	1	315
2	(Italy) Umberto Vaglio	DNS	2					2	DNS			3	2	5	5	115
3	(Italy) Federico Porri					2	Ret							3	2	62
4	(Italy) Luca Iannacone	WD	WD	1	1											55
5	(Italy) Patrick Bellezza	WD	WD											2	4	35
6	(Austria) Michael Aberer													4	3	34
7	(Italy) Giuseppe Marinaro											1	Ret			25
—	(Italy) Sergio Terrini	WD	WD													0
Formula Entry Class
1	(Italy) Matteo Zoccali											1	1	1	Ret	80
2	(United States) Rafał Wołosz							1	1							55
—	(Italy) Sergio Conti	WD	WD													0
—	(Italy) Federico Antonioli					WD	WD									0
Pos	Driver	SR	FR	SR	FR	SR	FR	SR	FR	SR	FR	SR	FR	SR	FR	Pts
Pos	Driver	MNZ (Italy)		MUG1 (Italy)		VLL (Italy)		MUG2 (Italy)		BRN (Czech Republic)		IMO (Italy)		MIS (Italy)		Pts

==== F2.0 Cup standings per class ====
The final score was formed by counting each drivers' five best sprint race scores, five best feature race scores as well as the attendance points for all race weekends.

Pos	Driver	MNZ (Italy)		MUG1 (Italy)		VLL (Italy)		MUG2 (Italy)		IMO (Italy)		MIS (Italy)		Pts
Pos	Driver	SR	FR	SR	FR	SR	FR	SR	FR	SR	FR	SR	FR	Pts
Overall
1	(Italy) Karim Sartori	(2)	(2)	2	2	1	1	1	1	1	1	1	1	275
2	(Portugal) Luis Aguiar	1	1	1	1	DNS	2	Ret	2					170
3	(Italy) Domenico Terron	4	Ret	4	4	2	3	WD	WD					85
4	(France) Bruno Mottez			6	6					2	2	8	Ret	73
5	(Italy) Fabio Turchetto	3	3									2	5	68
6	(Italy) Vincenzo Siciliano	5	5	5	5									50
7	(Italy) Riccardo Rossi	6	4									7	6	45
8	(France) Sarene Ziffel											5	2	37
9	(France) Tristan Morel			3	3									36
=	(Switzerland) Roger Bucher							3	3					36
11	(France) Wilfried Leroy							2	4					35
12	(Germany) Nicolas Löffler											3	4	32
=	(Austria) Alexander Geier											4	3	32
14	(Italy) Vito di Bello											6	7	19
—	(Italy) Marco de Toffol	WD	WD											0
Light Class
1	(France) Bruno Mottez			1	1					1	1	5	Ret	124
2	(Italy) Fabio Turchetto	1	1									1	2	104
3	(Italy) Riccardo Rossi	2	2									4	3	78
4	(France) Wilfried Leroy							1	1					55
5	(Germany) Nicolas Löffler											2	1	52
6	(Italy) Vito di Bello											3	4	32
—	(Italy) Marco de Toffol	WD	WD											0
Open Class
1	(Italy) Karim Sartori	(2)	(2)	2	2	1	1	1	1	1	1	1	1	275
2	(Portugal) Luis Aguiar	1	1	1	1	DNS	2	Ret	2					170
3	(Italy) Domenico Terron	3	Ret	4	4	2	3	WD	WD					87
4	(Italy) Vincenzo Siciliano	4	3	5	5									59
5	(Switzerland) Roger Bucher							2	3					39
6	(France) Sarene Ziffel											5	2	37
7	(France) Tristan Morel			3	3									36
8	(Austria) Alexander Geier											4	3	32
Pos	Driver	SR	FR	SR	FR	SR	FR	SR	FR	SR	FR	SR	FR	Pts
Pos	Driver	MNZ (Italy)		MUG1 (Italy)		VLL (Italy)		MUG2 (Italy)		IMO (Italy)		MIS (Italy)		Pts

=== Teams' standings ===
Each team counted the points of their two highest-finishing cars in each race.

==== F2000 Trophy ====
Pos	Team	Pts
1	(Austria) Franz Wöss Racing	488
2	(Italy) Puresport	387
3	(Switzerland) Jo Zeller Racing	329
4	(Italy) Facondini Racing	165
5	(Italy) One Competition	132
6	(Germany) Team Hoffmann Racing	91
7	(France) STAC	85
8	(Italy) ASD Autodromos - Nannini Racing	63
9	(Italy) Speed Motor	55
10	(France) Neri Autosport	55
11	(Italy) Viola Formula Racing	46
12	(Italy) Team Perodi	25
13	(Italy) G Motorsport	25
14	(Italy) Giordano Motorsport	25
15	(Italy) ASD Ruote Scoperte M.	15
16	(Italy) Henry Morrogh Drivers School	15
17	(Italy) Antonino Racing	15
18	(Italy) Valdelsa Classic Motor Club	10
19	(Italy) Bellspeed	10
20	(Italy) Alpha Team Racing	5
21	(France) Morel Auto Racing	5
22	(Italy) Scuderia Buell	5
23	(France) Team Ziffel	5
Pos	Team	Pts

==== F2.0 Cup ====
Pos	Team	Pts
1	(Italy) Speed Motor	315
2	(Italy) Viola Formula Racing	169
3	(France) Neri Autosport	112
4	(Italy) GTM Motorsport	95
5	(Italy) ASD Ruote Scoperte M.	71
6	(Italy) Valdelsa Classic Motor Club	51
7	(Italy) Team Perodi	50
8	(France) Team Ziffel	39
9	(France) Morel Auto Racing	36
10	(Switzerland) Jo Zeller Racing	36
11	(Austria) Franz Wöss Racing	36
12	(Italy) G Motorsport	23
Pos	Team	Pts
