= F2000 Italian Formula Trophy =

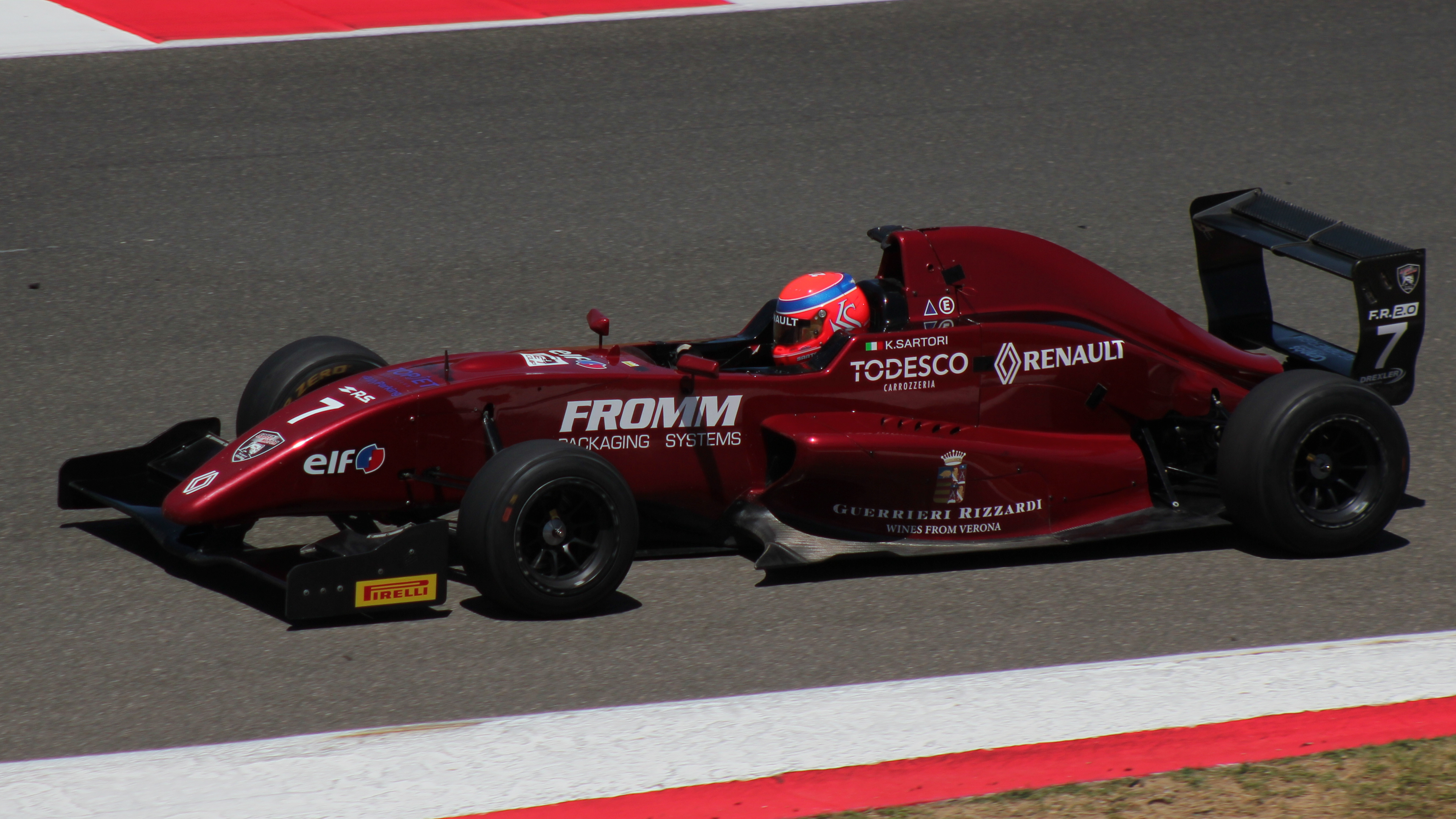
- Category: Single-seaters
- Country: Italy
- Inaugural season: 2014
- Constructors: Dallara, Mygale
- Engine suppliers: FIAT-FPT, Toyota
- Drivers' champion: (Switzerland) Sandro Zeller
- Teams' champion: (Austria) Franz Wöss Racing
- Official website: www.f2trophy.it

The F2000 Italian Formula Trophy is an open wheel racing series based in Italy. The series has run since 2014 under Formula Libre rules with mainly older Formula 3 cars and engines in use. Notable regular circuits include the Formula One circuits of Monza, Red Bull Ring and Imola.

== Champions ==
Season	Class 1 Champion	Team & Car/Engine	Class 2 Champion	Team & Car/Engine	Class 3 Champion	Team & Car/Engine
2014	(Italy) Marco Zanasi	(Italy) Tomcat Racing	(Italy) Domenico Liguori	(Italy) Victoria World	(Italy) Davide Pigozzi	(Italy) Twister Italia
2015	(Italy) Marco Zanasi	(Italy) TOMCAT Racing	(Italy) Domenico Liguori	(Italy) Domenico Liguori	(Italy) Davide Pigozzi	(Italy) Twister Italia
2016	(Italy) Andrea Fontana					
2017	(Italy) Riccardo Ponzio	(Italy) Puresport	(Italy) Dino Rasero	(Italy) Puresport	(Italy) Giorgio Berto	
2018	(Italy) Alessandro Bracalente	(Italy) Pave Motorsport				
2019	(Italy) Andrea Cola	(Italy) Monolite Racing	(Italy) Riccardo Perego			
2020	(Italy) Dino Rasero	(Italy) Puresport				
2021	(Italy) Bernarndo Pellegrini	(Italy) HT Racing				
2022	(Serbia) Paolo Brajnik	(Serbia) ASU NV Racing				
2023	(Japan) Juju Noda	(Japan) Noda Racing				
2024	(Hungary) Benjámin Berta	(Austria) Franz Wöss Racing				
2025	(Switzerland) Sandro Zeller	(Switzerland) Jo Zeller Racing				
