= 2024 Drexler-Automotive Formula Cup =

Motor racing competition

The 2024 Drexler-Automotive Formula Cup was the 43rd Austria Formula 3 Cup season and the sixth season since Drexler-Automotive took over the title sponsoring of the series.

The 2024 season was held over eight race weekends across Europe. It began in April at Vallelunga Circuit and concluded in October at Autodromo Nazionale Monza. The series continued its cooperation with the F2000 Italian Formula Trophy, with the two series sharing grids and race slots for multiple rounds.

Benjámin Berta, driving for Franz Wöss Racing, won his second Formula 3 Cup title with a race to spare, while Jo Zeller Racing driver Marcel Tobler defended his Formula 3 Trophy at the penultimate race weekend of the season. Viola Formula Racing's Emir Tanju clinched the Formula Light Cup at the final race of the season.

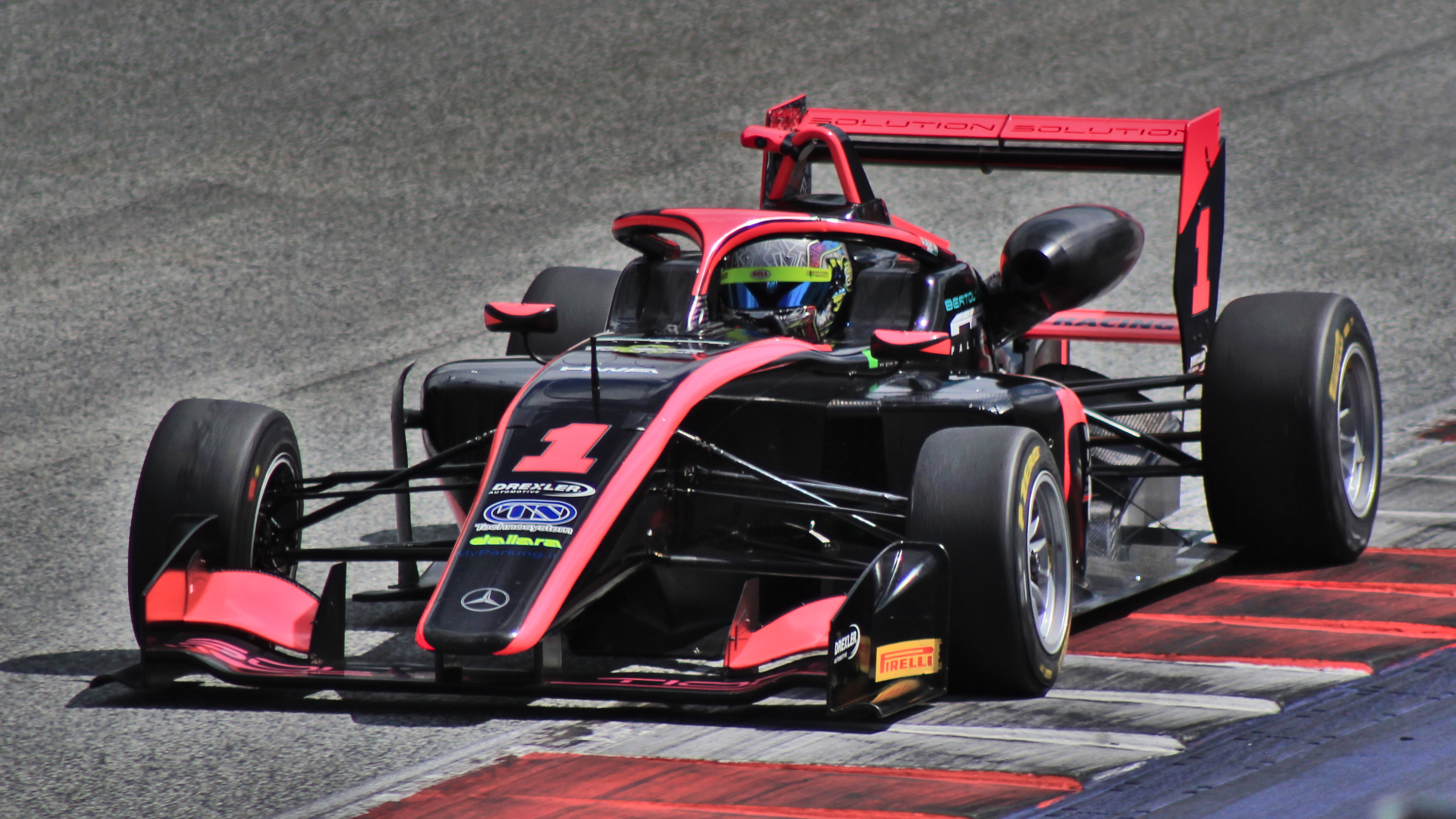
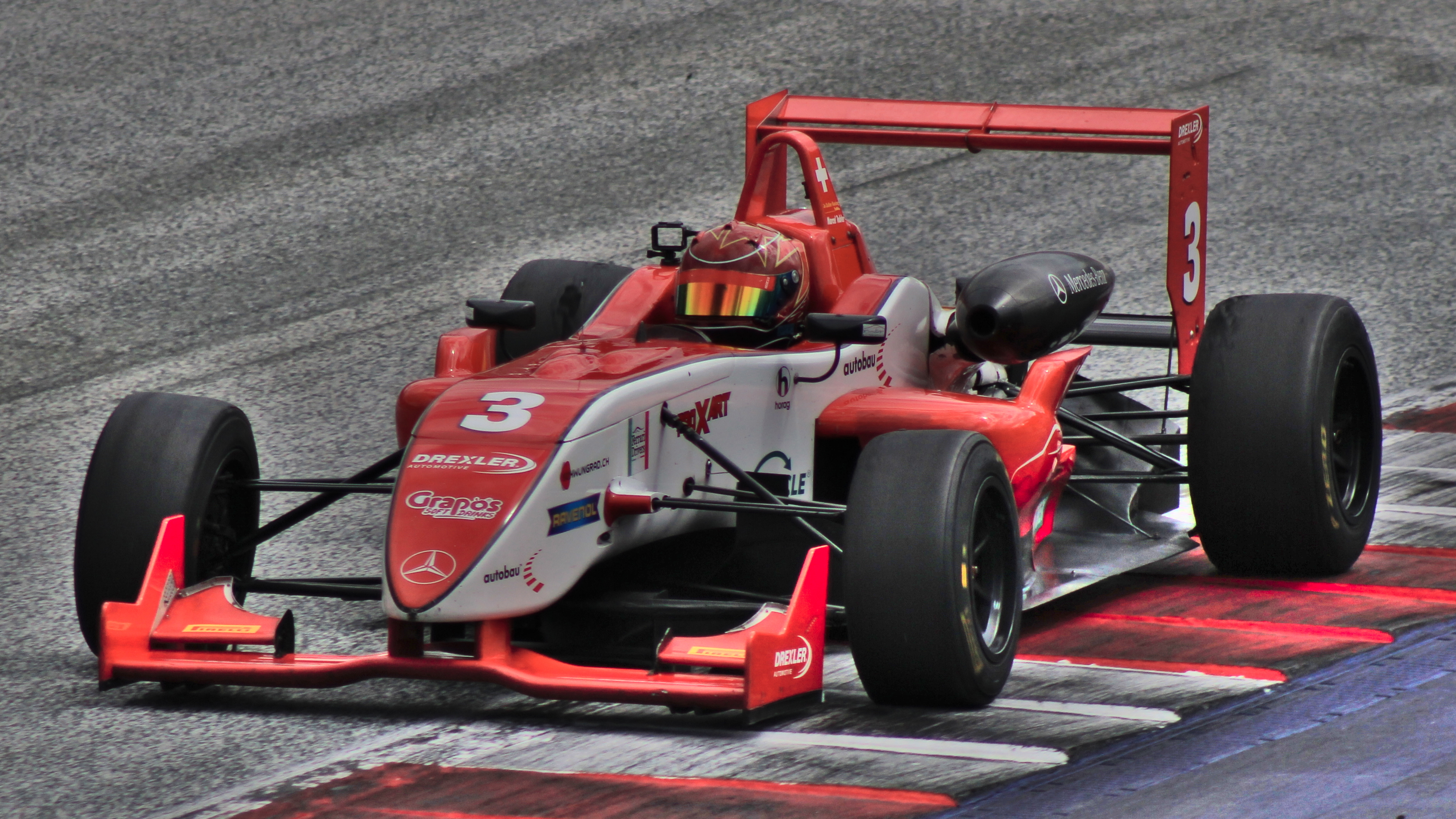
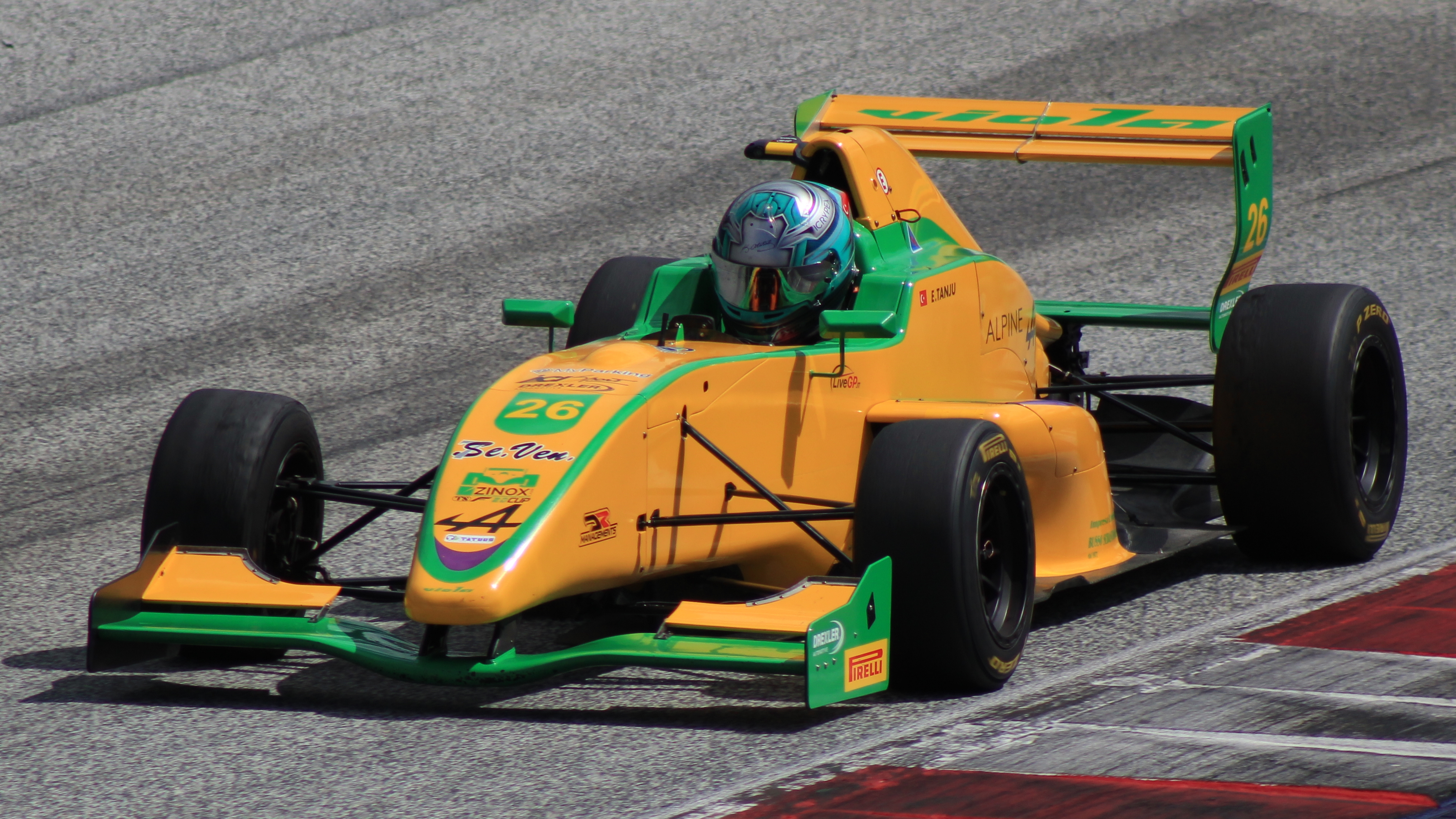
Benjámin Berta (top) and Marcel Tobler (middle) became back-to-back champions in the F3 Cup and the F3 Trophy. Emir Tanju (bottom) took the Formula Light Cup title.

== Teams and drivers ==
Teams and drivers competed in either Formula 3 or the Formula Light Cup. Formula 3 entries were divided between the Cup class and the Trophy class.

=== Formula 3 Cup entries ===
Team	No.	Driver	Car	Engine	Rounds
(Austria) Franz Wöss Racing	1	(Hungary) Benjámin Berta	Dallara F320	Mercedes	All
(Austria) Franz Wöss Racing	19	(Republic of Ireland) Cian Carey	Dallara F320	Mercedes	8
(Austria) Franz Wöss Racing	20	(Denmark) Stig Larsen	Dallara F320	Mercedes HWA	1–3, 5–6, 8
(Austria) Franz Wöss Racing	32	(Canada) Victor Smialek	Dallara F316	Mercedes HWA	All
(Italy) Viola Formula Racing	2	(Italy) Laurence Balestrini	Dallara F317	Volkswagen	6, 8
(Italy) Puresport	5	(Italy) Giorgio Venica	Dallara F308	Power Engine	3
(Italy) Puresport	8	(Italy) Dino Rasero	Dallara F320	Mercedes HWA	1, 3, 6, 8
(Italy) Puresport	12	(Switzerland) Christof Ledermann	Dallara F309	Power Engine	1
(Italy) Puresport	12	(Switzerland) Christof Ledermann	Tatuus F3 T-318	Alfa Romeo	2–3, 6, 8
(Italy) Puresport	14	(Italy) Andrea Benalli	Dallara F317	Mercedes HWA	1–3, 6, 8
(Italy) Puresport	33	(Qatar) Ahmad Shaheen Al Muhannadi	Dallara F312	Volkswagen	1–3, 6, 8
(Italy) Facondini Racing	41	(Italy) Franco Cimarelli	Dallara F312	VW	3, 8
(Switzerland) Jo Zeller Racing	11	(Switzerland) Kurt Böhlen	Dallara F316	Mercedes HWA	4–7
(Switzerland) Jo Zeller Racing	44	(Switzerland) Sandro Zeller	Dallara F316	Mercedes HWA	All
(Switzerland) Jo Zeller Racing	56	(Switzerland) Thomas Zeltner	Dallara F314	Mercedes	6
(Switzerland) Jo Zeller Racing	717	(Switzerland) Stephan Glaser	Dallara F314	Mercedes	7
(Italy) Bellspeed	27	(Italy) Patrick Bellezza	Dallara F300	Fiat Novamotor	8
(Italy) Team Automobile Tricolore	46	(Italy) Riccardo Perego	Dallara F317	Volkswagen	1–3, 6, 8
(Czech Republic) JMT Racing Klub	65	(Czech Republic) Roman Roubícek	Dallara F320	Mercedes HWA	2–8
(Italy) TVS Motorsport	69	(Italy) Enzo Stentella	Dallara F302	BMW	1–3, 6, 8
Racing in Italy	75	(Israel) Mei Shibi	Dallara F308	Volkswagen	1–3, 6, 8
(Czech Republic) GT2 Motorsport	98	(Czech Republic) Vaclav Safar	Dallara F320	Volkswagen	7
(Italy) G Motorsport	131	(Italy) Francesco Galli	Dallara F320	Volkswagen	1–3, 5–8
(Hungary) Magyar Racing Team	146	(Hungary) János Magyar	Tatuus N.T07	Honda	2, 7–8
(Serbia) ASU NV Racing	212	(Serbia) Paolo Brajnik	Dallara F320	Volkswagen	6

=== Formula 3 Trophy entries ===
Team	No.	Driver	Car	Engine	Rounds
(Switzerland) Jo Zeller Racing	2	(Switzerland) Urs Rüttimann	Dallara F306	VW Spiess	2–3, 8
(Switzerland) Jo Zeller Racing	3	(Switzerland) Marcel Tobler	Dallara F308	Mercedes HWA	2–3, 5, 7
(Germany) Team Hoffmann Racing	4	(Austria) Roman Hoffmann	Dallara F317	Toyota	2
(Germany) Team Hoffmann Racing	4	(Australia) Robert Rowe	Dallara F320	VW Spiess	5–7
(Germany) Team Hoffmann Racing	10	(Italy) Luca Iannacone	Dallara F308	Fiat FTP	2–4
(Germany) Team Hoffmann Racing	22	(Germany) André Petropoulos	Dallara F316	Opel Spiess	2, 4–7
(Italy) Facondini Racing	6	(Italy) Enrico Milani	Dallara F308	Fiat FTP	1, 3
(Italy) Facondini Racing	88	(Italy) Francesco Solfaroli	Dallara F317	Toyota	1, 3, 8
(Italy) Facondini Racing	96	(Germany) Oliver Kratsch	Dallara F308	Toyota	1–3
(Germany) Speed Center Team	7	(Germany) Christian Zeller	Dallara F305	Opel Spiess	5
(Germany) Speed Center Team	13	(Germany) Philipp Todtenhaupt	Dallara F317	Toyota	5
(Germany) Speed Center Team	199	(Switzerland) Thomas Zeltner	Dallara F314	Toyota	5
(Italy) Giordano Motorsport	9	(Italy) Giovanni Giordano	Dallara F308	Fiat FTP	1–3, 6, 8
(France) Neri Motorsport	10	(Italy) Luca Iannacone	Dallara F308	Fiat FTP	6–7
(Italy) ASD Living KC	21	(Italy) Umberto Vaglio	Dallara F308	Toyota	3, 6, 8
(Italy) Derva Corse ASD	24	(Italy) Marco de Toffol	Dallara F308	Fiat FTP	1–3, 6
(Italy) Bellspeed	27	(Italy) Patrick Bellezza	Dallara F300	Fiat Novamotor	3, 6
(Austria) Franz Wöss Racing	27	(Austria) Sedin Mujagic	Dallara F305	Opel Spiess	4–5, 7
(Italy) BMG Racing	28	(Italy) Giorgio Berto	Dallara F308	Fiat FTP	1, 8
(Italy) Team Automobile Tricolore	39	(Italy) Edoardo Bonanomi	Dallara F312	Mercedes HWA	1–3, 6, 8
(Italy) Nannini Racing	42	(Italy) Davide Pedetti	Dallara F317	Toyota	1–3
(Italy) Nannini Racing	43	(Italy) Giancarlo Pedetti	Dallara F317	Toyota	1–3, 6, 8
(Italy) Emotion Motorsport	83	(Italy) Daniele Radrizzani	Dallara F317	Toyota	2–3, 8
Privateer	911	(Austria) Nikolay Taykev	Dallara F308	Opel Spiess	7

=== Formula Light Cup entries ===
Team	No.	Driver	Car	Engine	Rounds
(Italy) Alpha Team Racing	3	(Italy) Giancarlo de Virgilis	Tatuus FR2.0	Renault	3, 8
(Italy) Speed Motor	7	(Italy) Karim Sartori	Tatuus FR2.0	Renault	1–3, 6, 8
(Germany) Speed Center Team	8	(Germany) Dennis Hübl	Tatuus FR2.0	Renault	5
(Germany) Speed Center Team	88	(Germany) Karl Todtenhaupt	Tatuus FR2.0	Renault	5
(Italy) Scuderia Cirelli	16	(Italy) Sara Fruncillo	Tatuus F4-T014	Abarth	6
(Italy) Scuderia Cirelli	17	(Italy) Tony di Giulio	Tatuus F4-T014	Abarth	1, 3
(Italy) GTM Motorsport	18	(Italy) Domenico Terron	Tatuus FR2.0	Renault	6
(France) Morel Auto Racing	23	(France) Tristan Morel	Tatuus FR2.0	Renault	2
(France) Neri Motorsport	23	(France) Bruno Mottez	Tatuus FR2.0	Renault	3
(France) Neri Motorsport	94	(France) Arthur Fouche	Tatuus FR2.0	Renault	6
(Italy) Viola Formula Racing	25	(Italy) Valentin Andreiux	Tatuus FR2.0	Renault	1–3, 8
(Italy) Viola Formula Racing	26	(Turkey) Emir Tanju	Tatuus FR2.0	Renault	1–3, 6, 8
(Italy) Viola Formula Racing	67	(Italy) Alessandro Zucco	Tatuus FR2.0	Renault	6, 8
Privateer	31	(France) Sarene Ziffel	Tatuus FR2.0	Renault	5
Privateer	33	(Germany) Andreas Stamann	Tatuus FR2.0	Renault	5
(Italy) ASD Ruote Scoperte M.	34	(Italy) Sergio Conti	Tatuus F4-T014	Abarth	2–3, 6, 8
(Italy) ASD Ruote Scoperte M.	79	(Italy) Fabio Turchetto	Tatuus FR2.0	Renault	3, 8
(Italy) Derva Corse ASD	40	(Italy) Andrea Cavigioli	Tatuus FR2.0	Renault	3, 6
(Italy) Derva Corse ASD	95	(Italy) Stefano Noal	Tatuus FR2.0	Renault	3, 6
(Germany) Conrad Racing Sport	68	(Germany) Hartmut Bertsch	Tatuus FR2.0	Renault	5
(Italy) Team HARS	71	(Italy) Luca Guolo	Tatuus FR2.0	Renault	3
(France) STAC	91	(France) Jérémy Clavaud	Tatuus FR2.0	Renault	3, 6, 8
(Italy) Team Perodi	92	(Italy) Romano Cataldo	Tatuus FR2.0	Renault	1, 3, 6, 8
(Germany) Team Hoffmann Racing	122	(Austria) Dr. Norbert Groer	Tatuus FR2.0	Renault	2, 4–8
(Germany) Team Hoffmann Racing	123	(Italy) Diego Romanini	Tatuus FR2.0	Renault	4
(Austria) Franz Wöss Racing	125	(United States) Robert Siska	Tatuus FR2.0	Renault	2, 6, 8
Privateer	163	(Germany) Falk Schwarze	Tatuus FR2.0	Renault	4, 7

== Race calendar ==
The championship changed three of its locations compared to 2023. Vallelunga and Monza returned to the calendar after a one-year absence, while the series also returned to the Lausitzring after last racing there in 2018. The rounds at Spa and the Hungaroring left the calendar, as well as the second round at Mugello.

R.	RN	Circuit	Date	Support bill	Map of circuit locations
1	1	(Italy) Vallelunga Circuit, Campagnano di Roma	21 April	TCR World Tour; TCR Europe Touring Car Series	2024 Drexler-Automotive Formula Cup is located in Europe
1	2	(Italy) Vallelunga Circuit, Campagnano di Roma	21 April	TCR World Tour; TCR Europe Touring Car Series	2024 Drexler-Automotive Formula Cup is located in Europe
2	1	(Austria) Red Bull Ring, Spielberg	18 May	Rundstreckentrophy; Eurocup-3	2024 Drexler-Automotive Formula Cup is located in Europe
2	2	(Austria) Red Bull Ring, Spielberg	19 May	Rundstreckentrophy; Eurocup-3	2024 Drexler-Automotive Formula Cup is located in Europe
3	1	(Italy) Imola Circuit, Imola	1 June	Italian GT Championship; Porsche Carrera Cup Italia	2024 Drexler-Automotive Formula Cup is located in Europe
3	2	(Italy) Imola Circuit, Imola	2 June	Italian GT Championship; Porsche Carrera Cup Italia	2024 Drexler-Automotive Formula Cup is located in Europe
4	1	(Germany) Lausitzring, Klettwitz	29 June	Porsche Club Historic Challenge; P9 Challenge	2024 Drexler-Automotive Formula Cup is located in Europe
4	2	(Germany) Lausitzring, Klettwitz	29 June	Porsche Club Historic Challenge; P9 Challenge	2024 Drexler-Automotive Formula Cup is located in Europe
5	1	(Germany) Hockenheimring, Hockenheim	27 July	Porsche Club Historic Challenge	2024 Drexler-Automotive Formula Cup is located in Europe
5	2	(Germany) Hockenheimring, Hockenheim	27 July	Porsche Club Historic Challenge	2024 Drexler-Automotive Formula Cup is located in Europe
6	1	(Italy) Mugello Circuit, Scarperia e San Piero	24 August	Euro 4 Championship; Italian GT Championship	2024 Drexler-Automotive Formula Cup is located in Europe
6	2	(Italy) Mugello Circuit, Scarperia e San Piero	25 August	Euro 4 Championship; Italian GT Championship	2024 Drexler-Automotive Formula Cup is located in Europe
7	1	(Czech Republic) Brno Circuit, Brno	7 September	TCR Europe Touring Car Series; TCR Eastern Europe	2024 Drexler-Automotive Formula Cup is located in Europe
7	2	(Czech Republic) Brno Circuit, Brno	8 September	TCR Europe Touring Car Series; TCR Eastern Europe	2024 Drexler-Automotive Formula Cup is located in Europe
8	1	(Italy) Monza Circuit, Monza	5 October	Italian GT Championship; Porsche Carrera Cup Italia	2024 Drexler-Automotive Formula Cup is located in Europe
8	2	(Italy) Monza Circuit, Monza	6 October	Italian GT Championship; Porsche Carrera Cup Italia	2024 Drexler-Automotive Formula Cup is located in Europe

== Race results ==
R.	RN	Circuit	Pole position	Fastest lap	F3 Cup winner	F3 Trophy winner	Formula Light Cup winner
1	1	(Italy) Vallelunga Circuit	(Italy) Francesco Galli	(Italy) Francesco Galli	(Italy) Francesco Galli	(Italy) Francesco Solfaroli	(Turkey) Emir Tanju
1	2	(Italy) Vallelunga Circuit		(Italy) Francesco Galli	(Italy) Francesco Galli	(Italy) Francesco Solfaroli	(Turkey) Emir Tanju
2	1	(Austria) Red Bull Ring	(Hungary) Benjámin Berta	(Hungary) Benjámin Berta	(Italy) Francesco Galli	(Switzerland) Marcel Tobler	(Italy) Valentin Andreiux
2	2	(Austria) Red Bull Ring		(Hungary) Benjámin Berta	(Switzerland) Sandro Zeller	(Switzerland) Marcel Tobler	(Italy) Karim Sartori
3	1	(Italy) Autodromo Enzo e Dino Ferrari	(Hungary) Benjámin Berta	(Italy) Francesco Galli	(Hungary) Benjámin Berta	(Switzerland) Marcel Tobler	(Italy) Karim Sartori
3	2	(Italy) Autodromo Enzo e Dino Ferrari		(Italy) Francesco Galli	(Switzerland) Sandro Zeller	(Italy) Francesco Solfaroli	(Turkey) Emir Tanju
4	1	(Germany) Lausitzring	(Hungary) Benjámin Berta	(Switzerland) Sandro Zeller	(Hungary) Benjámin Berta	(Germany) André Petropoulos	(Germany) Falk Schwarze
4	2	(Germany) Lausitzring		(Hungary) Benjámin Berta	(Hungary) Benjámin Berta	(Germany) André Petropoulos	(Germany) Falk Schwarze
5	1	(Germany) Hockenheimring	(Switzerland) Sandro Zeller	(Switzerland) Sandro Zeller	(Switzerland) Sandro Zeller	(Switzerland) Marcel Tobler	(France) Sarene Ziffel
5	2	(Germany) Hockenheimring		(Hungary) Benjámin Berta	(Canada) Victor Smialek	(Switzerland) Marcel Tobler	(France) Sarene Ziffel
6	1	(Italy) Mugello Circuit	(Hungary) Benjámin Berta	(Hungary) Benjámin Berta	(Switzerland) Sandro Zeller	(Italy) Edoardo Bonanomi	(France) Jérémy Clavaud
6	2	(Italy) Mugello Circuit		(Hungary) Benjámin Berta	(Hungary) Benjámin Berta	(Italy) Edoardo Bonanomi	(France) Jérémy Clavaud
7	1	(Czech Republic) Brno Circuit	(Hungary) Benjámin Berta	(Hungary) Benjámin Berta	(Hungary) Benjámin Berta	(Germany) André Petropoulos	(Austria) Dr. Norbert Groer
7	2	(Czech Republic) Brno Circuit		(Hungary) Benjámin Berta	(Hungary) Benjámin Berta	(Switzerland) Marcel Tobler	(Austria) Dr. Norbert Groer
8	1	(Italy) Monza Circuit	(Hungary) Benjámin Berta	(Hungary) Benjámin Berta	(Hungary) Benjámin Berta	(Switzerland) Urs Rüttimann	(Italy) Valentin Andreiux
8	2	(Italy) Monza Circuit		(Hungary) Benjámin Berta	(Italy) Francesco Galli	(Italy) Edoardo Bonanomi	(Italy) Valentin Andreiux

== Season report ==
=== First half ===
The season opened at Vallelunga with G Motorsport's Francesco Galli on pole position. He had to contend with Franz Wöss Racing's Benjámin Berta all race, but held on to take the win. Race two saw a repeat of the fight for the win, with Galli victorious again. Jo Zeller Racing's Sandro Zeller was third in race one and looked set to repeat that feat before colliding with Team Automobile Tricolore's Riccardo Perego in race two while battling for third. The F3 Trophy saw a double win for Facondini Racing's Francesco Solfaroli, while the Light Cup witnessed the opening exchange of blows in a season-long fight between Viola Formula's Emir Tanju and Speed Motor's Karim Sartori, with the Turk winning twice.

The Red Bull Ring hosted round two, and this time Berta took pole position. Still, Galli was the man to beat in the races as he overtook Berta right at the start and took his third win in a row. This streak came to a halt in race two when Galli slid off track and had to retire. This left Berta and Zeller fighting for the win, with Berta coming home first, but with a time penalty that handed Zeller the win. Berta's teammate Victor Smialek was third. Jo Zeller Racing's Marcel Tobler made his first appearance of the season in the F3 Trophy and took two wins right away, while wins in the Light Cup were shared between Viola Formula's Valentin Andreiux and Sartori. Tanju was second twice, thereby retaining his points lead.

Round three at Imola also began with Berta on pole position. Galli had superior race pace but once again made a mistake that forced him into retirement, leaving Berta to take his first win of the season as well as the championship lead, ahead of Zeller and Smialek. The Swiss then went one place better in race two, keeping his lead from pole position and fending off Galli and Berta all race. In the F3 Trophy, joint championship leaders Solfaroli and Tobler met each other on track for the first time. Both took a win and a second place, remaining equal on points. The picture in the Light Cup was similar, with leaders Tanju and Sartori also sharing the wins, further distancing themselves from the rest of the field.

Only eleven cars travelled to the Lausitzring, where Berta took another pole position. Galli was not among the attendees, so the fight for both races was between Berta and Zeller. Race one saw a close fight, while race two was dominated from pole - Berta was the winner both times. Smialek took two third places, thereby overtaking Galli in the standings. Both F3 Trophy leaders were absent too, leaving Team Hoffmann Racing’s André Petropoulos to take two wins and instantly move into second place in the standings. The same was seen in the Formula Light Cup, with Tanju and Sartori not joining the grid, allowing privateer entrant Falk Schwarze to take a double win on his debut in the championship.

=== Second half ===
The second half of the season began at Hockenheimring with a different pole sitter in Zeller. Berta initially got past him, but Zeller kept close to him to retake the lead and win the race. Smialek took third, before taking his maiden win ahead of returnee Galli and Jo Zeller Racing’s Kurt Böhlen in race two after Berta was hit with a 30-second penalty that dropped him to fourth. Tobler returned to the F3 Trophy and took two wins and the championship lead as Solfaroli was still absent. Petropoulos took a podium to reduce his distance to Solfaroli. The Formula Light Cup saw another double by a privateer debutant, with Sarene Ziffel sweeping the weekend as Tanju and Sartori missed another round.

Round six at Mugello brought the F2000 entries back to the field, with 39 cars entered. Berta won pole position once again, but collided with Galli a few laps into the first race and retired. Zeller was left to take the win ahead of Smialek and ASU NV’s one-off entry Paolo Brajnik. In the second race, Galli stalled at the start, with Berta taking the lead and the win ahead of Zeller and Smialek. Team Automobile Tricolore’s Eduardo Bonanomi took both F3 Trophy wins as Petropoulos was the only front-runner competing, taking one sixth place. Tanju and Sartori returned to the Formula Light Cup, but the winner of both races was STAC’s Jérémy Clavaud. Still, Sartori was able to overtake Tanju in the standings.

The penultimate round at Brno Circuit saw Berta take another pole position, which he then turned into a controlled lights-to-flag victory, with Smialek and Zeller making up the F3 Cup podium behind him. Race two began with Smialek taking the lead, before Berta retook it and reestablished the competitive picture seen in the first race. The top three finished the race in the same order, handing Berta a 28-point lead. Wins in the F3 Trophy were shared by Petropoulos and Tobler, with the former taking second in the standings and the latter crowned class champion. Team Hoffmann’s Dr. Norbert Groer was the sole entry in the Formula Light Cup and took two wins, each only worth half points.

Berta took his third pole position in a row for the season finale at Monza. After a delayed start to race one, Berta managed two restarts to take his seventh win of the season ahead of Smialek and Zeller, crowning him the champion in the process. Race two began with Smialek in the lead, but a bad mid-race restart saw him fall to fourth behind eventual winner Galli, Berta and Zeller. The top two drivers in the F3 Trophy were absent, leaving Jo Zeller Racing’s Urs Rüttimann and Bonanomi to finish the season with a win each. Andreiux won both races in the Formula Light Cup, but Tanju was able to claim the class title by just four points after Sartori was forced to retire from the final race.

Berta’s second championship in a row saw him notch up seven wins and 14 podiums in 16 races. At the start of the year, however, the fastest driver of the field was Galli, who began the season with three wins in a row. A double non-score then set him back considerably, and when he did not contest two of the rounds outside Italy, he was removed from contention. That left Zeller as Berta’s closest competitor, but he was no match for the Hungarian, just like in 2023. The F3 Trophy was once again characterized by high entry fluctuation, with Tobler repeating his 2023 feat of dominating the weekends he contested, while the Formula Light Cup saw a title battle closely fought across five of the eight rounds, with very little drivers traveling to Germany and Czechia.

== Standings ==
=== Scoring system ===
Points were awarded per class. If less than three cars entered in a class, half points were awarded for the race.

Position	**1st**	**2nd**	**3rd**	**4th**	**5th**	**6th**	**7th**	**8th**	**9th**	**10th**
Points	25	18	15	12	10	8	6	4	2	1

* - half points awarded as less than three cars entered the race

=== Formula 3 Cup standings ===
Pos	Driver	VLL (Italy)		RBR (Austria)		IMO (Italy)		LAU (Germany)		HOC (Germany)		MUG (Italy)		BRN (Czech Republic)		MNZ (Italy)		Pts
Pos	Driver	R1	R2	R1	R2	R1	R2	R1	R2	R1	R2	R1	R2	R1	R2	R1	R2	Pts
1	(Hungary) Benjámin Berta	2	2	**2**	2	**1**	3	**1**	1	2	4	**Ret**	1	**1**	1	**1**	2	310
2	(Switzerland) Sandro Zeller	3	10	3	1	2	1	2	2	**1**	7	1	2	3	3	3	3	269
3	(Canada) Victor Smialek	9	4	4	3	3	5	3	3	3	1	2	3	2	2	2	4	235
4	(Italy) Francesco Galli	**1**	1	1	Ret	Ret	2			6	2	11	6	WD	WD	4	1	164
5	(Denmark) Stig Larsen	8	7	5	6	6	7			4	5	7	4			Ret	7	88
6	(Italy) Riccardo Perego	4	3	9	5	4	4					9	8			Ret	Ret	69
7	(Switzerland) Kurt Böhlen							4	4	Ret	3	10	7	4	5			68
8	(Italy) Andrea Benalli	5	5	11	4	5	6					8	10			Ret	6	63
9	(Czech Republic) Roman Roubícek			12	9	10	13	5	5	5	6	5	Ret	Ret	7	9	13	59
10	(Italy) Enzo Stentella	7	6	10	12	12	14					4	5			8	Ret	41
11	(Italy) Dino Rasero	6	9			8	9					6	9			6	15	34
12	(Qatar) Ahmad Shaheen Al Muhannadi	11	11	6	8	7	8					Ret	DNS			7	10	29
13	(Hungary) János Magyar			Ret	7									6	6	13	9	24
14	(Czech Republic) Vaclav Safar													5	4			22
15	(Serbia) Paolo Brajnik											3	DNS					15
16	(Italy) Franco Cimarelli					13	DNS									5	8	14
17	(Republic of Ireland) Cian Carey															14	5	10
18	(Israel) Mei Shibi	12	12	7	10	9	10					WD	WD			DSQ	WD	10
19	(Switzerland) Christof Ledermann	10	8	8	11	Ret	12					13	13			11	12	9
20	(Switzerland) Stephan Glaser													7	Ret			6
21	(Italy) Laurence Balestrini											14	11			10	11	1
22	(Italy) Giorgio Venica					11	11											0
23	(Switzerland) Thomas Zeltner											12	12					0
24	(Italy) Patrick Bellezza															12	14	0
Pos	Driver	R1	R2	R1	R2	R1	R2	R1	R2	R1	R2	R1	R2	R1	R2	R1	R2	Pts
Pos	Driver	VLL (Italy)		RBR (Austria)		IMO (Italy)		LAU (Germany)		HOC (Germany)		MUG (Italy)		BRN (Czech Republic)		MNZ (Italy)		Pts

Colour	Result
Gold	Winner
Silver	Second place
Bronze	Third place
Green	Points classification
Blue	Non-points classification
Blue	Non-classified finish (NC)
Purple	Retired, not classified (Ret)
Red	Did not qualify (DNQ)
Red	Did not pre-qualify (DNPQ)
Black	Disqualified (DSQ)
White	Did not start (DNS)
White	Withdrew (WD)
White	Race cancelled (C)
Blank	Did not practice (DNP)
Blank	Did not arrive (DNA)
Blank	Excluded (EX)

**Bold** – Pole

Italics – Fastest Lap

† — Did not finish, but classified

=== Formula 3 Trophy standings ===
Pos	Driver	VLL (Italy)		RBR (Austria)		IMO (Italy)		LAU (Germany)		HOC (Germany)		MUG (Italy)		BRN (Czech Republic)		MNZ (Italy)		Pts
Pos	Driver	R1	R2	R1	R2	R1	R2	R1	R2	R1	R2	R1	R2	R1	R2	R1	R2	Pts
1	(Switzerland) Marcel Tobler			1	1	1	2			1	1			2	1			186
2	(Germany) André Petropoulos			Ret	3			1	1	Ret	2	Ret	6	1	2			134
3	(Italy) Francesco Solfaroli	1	1			2	1									3	2	126
4	(Italy) Edoardo Bonanomi	5	3	Ret	8	NC	NC					1	1			2	1	122
5	(Italy) Luca Iannacone			DNS	9	Ret	Ret	2	2			5	4	4	3			87
6	(Switzerland) Urs Rüttimann			2	2	5	3									1	Ret	86
7	(Australia) Robert Rowe									2	5	Ret	2	3	4			73
8	(Italy) Giancarlo Pedetti	Ret	7	4	10	7	7					2	5			4	Ret	71
9	(Italy) Giovanni Giordano	3	8	Ret	6	3	5					4	Ret			DNS	DNS	64
10	(Italy) Davide Pedetti	2	2	Ret	4	Ret	9											50
11	(Germany) Oliver Kratsch	Ret	4	3	7	4	8											49
12	(Austria) Sedin Mujagic							3	3	5	7†			WD	WD			46
13	(Italy) Umberto Vaglio					6	6					3	3			DNS	WD	46
14	(Italy) Enrico Milani	4	6			8	4											36
15	(Switzerland) Thomas Zeltner									3	4							27
17	(Italy) Daniele Radrizzani			Ret	DNS											5	3	25
17	(Germany) Philipp Todtenhaupt									4	6							20
18	(Italy) Marco de Toffol	Ret	5	Ret	5							WD	WD					20
19	(Germany) Christian Zeller									NC	3							15
20	(Italy) Giorgio Berto	Ret	9													DNS	4	14
—	(Austria) Roman Hoffmann			WD	WD													0
—	(Italy) Patrick Bellezza					WD	WD					WD	WD					0
—	(Austria) Nikolay Taykev													WD	WD			0
Pos	Driver	R1	R2	R1	R2	R1	R2	R1	R2	R1	R2	R1	R2	R1	R2	R1	R2	Pts
Pos	Driver	VLL (Italy)		RBR (Austria)		IMO (Italy)		LAU (Germany)		HOC (Germany)		MUG (Italy)		BRN (Czech Republic)		MNZ (Italy)		Pts

=== Formula Light Cup standings ===
Pos	Driver	VLL (Italy)		RBR (Austria)		IMO (Italy)		LAU (Germany)		HOC (Germany)		MUG (Italy)		BRN (Czech Republic)		MNZ (Italy)		Pts
Pos	Driver	R1	R2	R1	R2	R1	R2	R1	R2	R1	R2	R1	R2	R1	R2	R1	R2	Pts
1	(Turkey) Emir Tanju	1	1	2	2	2	1					4	Ret			4	3	168
2	(Italy) Karim Sartori	2	3	3	1	1	2					3	2			3	Ret	164
3	(Austria) Dr. Norbert Groer			5	4			3	3	3	3	9	6	1*	1*	6	DNS	125
4	(Italy) Valentin Andreiux	Ret	2	1	6	Ret	3									1	1	116
5	(France) Jérémy Clavaud					5	5					1	1			DNS	Ret	70
6	(Italy) Alessandro Zucco											2	3			2	2	69
=7	(Germany) Falk Schwarze							1	1					WD	WD			50
=7	(France) Sarene Ziffel									1	1							50
9	(Italy) Fabio Turchetto					3	4									5	4	49
10	(Italy) Romano Cataldo	Ret	4			WD	WD					7	4			Ret	5	40
11	(United States) Robert Siska			6	5							10	7			7	6	39
=12	(Italy) Diego Romanini							2	2									36
=12	(Germany) Dennis Hübl									2	2							36
14	(Italy) Stefano Noal					4	6					5	Ret					30
15	(France) Tristan Morel			4	3													27
16	(Italy) Sergio Conti			7	7	9	11					11	8			9	7	27
17	(Germany) Karl Todtenhaupt									4	4							24
18	(Italy) Andrea Cavigioli					Ret	7					8	5					20
19	(Italy) Giancarlo de Virgilis					8	10									8	8	13
20	(Italy) Luca Guolo					6	8											12
21	(France) Arthur Fouche											6	Ret					8
22	(France) Bruno Mottez					7	9											8
23	(Italy) Sara Fruncillo											12	9					2
—	(Italy) Tony di Giulio	Ret	Ret			WD	WD											0
—	(Germany) Andreas Stamann									WD	WD							0
—	(Germany) Hartmut Bertsch									WD	WD							0
—	(Italy) Domenico Terron											WD	WD					0
Pos	Driver	R1	R2	R1	R2	R1	R2	R1	R2	R1	R2	R1	R2	R1	R2	R1	R2	Pts
Pos	Driver	VLL (Italy)		RBR (Austria)		IMO (Italy)		LAU (Germany)		HOC (Germany)		MUG (Italy)		BRN (Czech Republic)		MNZ (Italy)		Pts
