= 2024 Euro 4 Championship =

Motor racing championship season

The 2024 Euro 4 Championship was the second season of the Euro 4 Championship. It was a multi-event motor racing championship for open wheel, formula racing cars regulated according to FIA Formula 4 regulations, run by ACI Sport and WSK Promotion. The championship used Tatuus F4-T421 chassis.

== Teams and drivers ==
Team	No.	Driver	Class	Rounds
(Netherlands) Van Amersfoort Racing	2	(United States) Hudson Schwartz		3
(Netherlands) Van Amersfoort Racing	6	(Japan) Hiyu Yamakoshi		All
(Netherlands) Van Amersfoort Racing	8	(Serbia) Andrija Kostić	R	All
(Netherlands) Van Amersfoort Racing	36	(Sweden) Gustav Jonsson		All
(Netherlands) Van Amersfoort Racing	55	(Italy) Alvise Rodella		1–2
(Netherlands) Van Amersfoort Racing	88	(Netherlands) Lin Hodenius		All
(Germany) PHM AIX Racing	3	(Italy) Maksimilian Popov (Note: Popov is Russian, but he competes under an Italian licence as Russian national emblems were banned by the FIA following the Russian invasion of Ukraine.)	R	All
(Germany) PHM AIX Racing	9	(United States) Everett Stack		All
(Germany) PHM AIX Racing	16	(Italy) Davide Larini		All
(Germany) PHM AIX Racing	78	(Brazil) Gabriel Gomez	R	1
(France) ART Grand Prix	4	(Philippines) Bianca Bustamante	W	3
(France) ART Grand Prix	57	(Brazil) Aurelia Nobels	W	3
(San Marino) AKM Motorsport	5	(Italy) Mattia Marchiante	R	3
(San Marino) AKM Motorsport	7	(Italy) Mattia Marchiante	R	1
(San Marino) AKM Motorsport	52	(Ukraine) Oleksandr Savinkov	R	1
(San Marino) AKM Motorsport	73	(Italy) Emanuele Olivieri	R	1, 3
(France) R-ace GP	7	(Finland) Luka Sammalisto	R	2–3
(France) R-ace GP	77	(Italy) Enzo Yeh (Note: Yeh is a Taiwanese driver competing under an Italian licence.)	R	All
(Romania) Real Racing	11	(Romania) Luca Viișoreanu	R	All
(Germany) US Racing	12	(Australia) Gianmarco Pradel		All
(Germany) US Racing	15	(United Kingdom) Edu Robinson	R	2–3
(Germany) US Racing	19	(Singapore) Kabir Anurag	R	All
(Germany) US Racing	31	(India) Akshay Bohra		All
(Germany) US Racing	45	(Australia) Jack Beeton		All
(Germany) US Racing	71	(Germany) Maxim Rehm	R	All
(Italy) Prema Racing	14	(United Arab Emirates) Rashid Al Dhaheri		1–2
(Italy) Prema Racing	27	(United Kingdom) Freddie Slater		All
(Italy) Prema Racing	33	(Latvia) Tomass Štolcermanis	R	All
(Italy) Prema Racing	50	(United Kingdom) Dion Gowda (Note: Gowda is an Indian driver competing under a British licence.)		All
(Italy) Prema Racing	51	(United Kingdom) Kean Nakamura-Berta (Note: Nakamura-Berta is a Japanese-Slovak driver competing under a British licence.)	R	All
(Italy) Prema Racing	80	(United States) Alex Powell (Note: Powell is a Jamaican-American driver competing under an American licence.)	R	All
(Switzerland) Jenzer Motorsport	21	(Switzerland) Ethan Ischer		All
(Switzerland) Jenzer Motorsport	22	(Switzerland) Enea Frey	R	All
(Switzerland) Jenzer Motorsport	23	(Netherlands) Reno Francot		3
(Italy) Cram Motorsport	35	(United Kingdom) Kai Daryanani (Note: Daryanani is an Indian driver competing under a British licence.)		2
(United Kingdom) Hitech Pulse-Eight	84	(United Kingdom) Reza Seewooruthun	R	2
(United Kingdom) Hitech Pulse-Eight	85	(United Kingdom) Thomas Bearman	R	2
(United Kingdom) Hitech Pulse-Eight	87	(United Kingdom) Deagen Fairclough		2

Icon	Legend
R	Rookie
W	Woman Trophy

== Race calendar and results ==
The provisional calendar was released on 4 August 2023. The Hungaroring round was provisionally included, but removed from the calendar later.

Round		Circuit	Date	Pole position	Fastest lap	Winning driver	Winning team	Rookie Winner	Supporting
1	R1	(Italy) Mugello Circuit, Scarperia e San Piero	24 August	(India) Akshay Bohra	(United Kingdom) Dion Gowda	(India) Akshay Bohra	(Germany) US Racing	(United Kingdom) Kean Nakamura-Berta	Italian GT Championship; Drexler-Automotive Formula Cup; F2000 Italian Formula Trophy
1	R2	(Italy) Mugello Circuit, Scarperia e San Piero	25 August	(India) Akshay Bohra	(Japan) Hiyu Yamakoshi	(Japan) Hiyu Yamakoshi	(Netherlands) Van Amersfoort Racing	(Germany) Maxim Rehm	Italian GT Championship; Drexler-Automotive Formula Cup; F2000 Italian Formula Trophy
1	R3	(Italy) Mugello Circuit, Scarperia e San Piero	25 August	(India) Akshay Bohra	(India) Akshay Bohra	(India) Akshay Bohra	(Germany) US Racing	(United Kingdom) Kean Nakamura-Berta	Italian GT Championship; Drexler-Automotive Formula Cup; F2000 Italian Formula Trophy
2	R1	(Austria) Red Bull Ring, Spielberg	14 September	(United Kingdom) Freddie Slater	(United Kingdom) Kean Nakamura-Berta	(United Kingdom) Freddie Slater	(Italy) Prema Racing	(Latvia) Tomass Štolcermanis	International GT Open; Formula Regional European Championship; Euroformula Open Championship; Porsche Carrera Cup Benelux
2	R2	(Austria) Red Bull Ring, Spielberg	15 September	(Latvia) Tomass Štolcermanis	(United Kingdom) Freddie Slater	(United Kingdom) Freddie Slater	(Italy) Prema Racing	(Germany) Maxim Rehm	International GT Open; Formula Regional European Championship; Euroformula Open Championship; Porsche Carrera Cup Benelux
2	R3	(Austria) Red Bull Ring, Spielberg	15 September	(United Kingdom) Freddie Slater	(United Kingdom) Reza Seewooruthun	(Japan) Hiyu Yamakoshi (Note: Slater originally won the race, but later received a 5-second time penalty for forcing Gustav Jonsson off track.)	(Netherlands) Van Amersfoort Racing	(United States) Alex Powell	International GT Open; Formula Regional European Championship; Euroformula Open Championship; Porsche Carrera Cup Benelux
3	R1	(Italy) Monza Circuit, Monza	5 October	(Germany) Maxim Rehm	(Italy) Davide Larini	(United States) Alex Powell	(Italy) Prema Racing	(United States) Alex Powell	Italian GT Championship; Drexler-Automotive Formula Cup; F2000 Italian Formula Trophy; Porsche Carrera Cup Italia
3	R2	(Italy) Monza Circuit, Monza	6 October	(Italy) Davide Larini	(Australia) Gianmarco Pradel	(United Kingdom) Kean Nakamura-Berta	(Italy) Prema Racing	(United Kingdom) Kean Nakamura-Berta	Italian GT Championship; Drexler-Automotive Formula Cup; F2000 Italian Formula Trophy; Porsche Carrera Cup Italia
3	R3	(Italy) Monza Circuit, Monza	6 October	(United Kingdom) Kean Nakamura-Berta	(United States) Alex Powell	(Germany) Maxim Rehm	(Germany) US Racing	(Germany) Maxim Rehm	Italian GT Championship; Drexler-Automotive Formula Cup; F2000 Italian Formula Trophy; Porsche Carrera Cup Italia

== Championship standings ==
Points are awarded to the top 10 classified finishers in each race. No points are awarded for pole position or fastest lap.

Position	**1st**	**2nd**	**3rd**	**4th**	**5th**	**6th**	**7th**	**8th**	**9th**	**10th**
Points	25	18	15	12	10	8	6	4	2	1

=== Drivers' championship ===
Pos	Driver	MUG (Italy)			RBR (Austria)			MNZ (Italy)			Pts
Pos	Driver	R1	R2	R3	R1	R2	R3	R1	R2	R3	Pts
1	(India) Akshay Bohra	**1**	**8**	**1**	4	12	4	2	2	5	124
2	(United Kingdom) Freddie Slater	5	2	10	**1**	1	**3**	5	9	Ret	106
3	(United Kingdom) Kean Nakamura-Berta	4	11	4	3	7	Ret	4	1	**3**	97
4	(Japan) Hiyu Yamakoshi	2	1	11	25†	3	1	11	7	15	89
5	(Latvia) Tomass Štolcermanis	Ret	7	5	2	**5**	6	3	5	7	83
6	(Germany) Maxim Rehm	8	6	Ret	5	4	25	**Ret**	8	1	63
7	(Sweden) Gustav Jonsson	3	3	Ret	7	2	16	9	12	22	56
8	(Australia) Jack Beeton	Ret	4	2	Ret	25	Ret	10	4	6	51
9	(United States) Alex Powell	9	Ret	21	8	13	5	1	6	14	49
10	(Australia) Gianmarco Pradel	Ret	5	6	11	8	Ret	Ret	3	4	49
11	(United Arab Emirates) Rashid Al Dhaheri	7	10	17	9	6	2				35
12	(Italy) Davide Larini	15	9	13	6	14	24	16	**10**	2	29
13	(Switzerland) Ethan Ischer	10	20	3	Ret	10	11	7	16	11	23
14	(United Kingdom) Dion Gowda	6	15	7	Ret	16	9	15	11	16	16
15	(Serbia) Andrija Kostić	22†	18	15	19	22	18	6	25	21	8
16	(United Kingdom) Edu Robinson				21	21	7	Ret	29	20	6
17	(Switzerland) Enea Frey	11	26†	8	13	19	13	23†	13	19	4
18	(Singapore) Kabir Anurag	Ret	14	Ret	22	27	15	8	18	13	4
19	(United Kingdom) Reza Seewooruthun				16	20	8				4
20	(Finland) Luka Sammalisto				Ret	17	17	Ret	21	8	4
21	(Italy) Maksimilian Popov	12	19	9	14	9	12	20	14	27	4
22	(Romania) Luca Viișoreanu	16	24	18	10	23	10	Ret	20	10	3
23	(Italy) Emanuele Olivieri	13	25†	14				21	17	9	2
24	(United Kingdom) Deagen Fairclough				12	11	14				0
25	(Italy) Enzo Yeh	14	16	12	24	26	19	12	15	24	0
26	(Brazil) Gabriel Gomez	18	12	16							0
27	(Netherlands) Reno Francot							Ret	22	12	0
28	(Netherlands) Lin Hodenius	Ret	13	Ret	18	15	21	13	23	17	0
29	(Brazil) Aurelia Nobels							14	27	26	0
30	(United States) Everett Stack	19	22	19	15	28	22	17	28	18	0
31	(Italy) Alvise Rodella	17	21	Ret	23	18	20				0
32	(Ukraine) Oleksandr Savinkov	20	17	22							0
33	(United Kingdom) Kai Daryanani				17	24	Ret				0
34	(Philippines) Bianca Bustamante							18	24	28	0
35	(United States) Hudson Schwartz							19	19	23	0
36	(Italy) Mattia Marchiante	21	23	20				22	26	25	0
37	(United Kingdom) Thomas Bearman				20	Ret	23				0
Pos	Driver	R1	R2	R3	R1	R2	R3	R1	R2	R3	Pts
Pos	Driver	MUG (Italy)			RBR (Austria)			MNZ (Italy)			Pts

Colour	Result
Gold	Winner
Silver	Second place
Bronze	Third place
Green	Points classification
Blue	Non-points classification
Blue	Non-classified finish (NC)
Purple	Retired, not classified (Ret)
Red	Did not qualify (DNQ)
Red	Did not pre-qualify (DNPQ)
Black	Disqualified (DSQ)
White	Did not start (DNS)
White	Withdrew (WD)
White	Race cancelled (C)
Blank	Did not practice (DNP)
Blank	Did not arrive (DNA)
Blank	Excluded (EX)

**Bold** – Pole
Italics – Fastest Lap
† — Did not finish, but classified

=== Rookies' championship ===
Pos	Driver	MUG (Italy)			RBR (Austria)			MNZ (Italy)			Pts
Pos	Driver	R1	R2	R3	R1	R2	R3	R1	R2	R3	Pts
1	(United Kingdom) Kean Nakamura-Berta	1	3	1	2	3	Ret	3	1	2	156
2	(Latvia) Tomass Štolcermanis	Ret	2	2	1	2	2	2	2	3	148
3	(Germany) Maxim Rehm	2	1	Ret	3	1	13	Ret	4	1	120
4	(United States) Alex Powell	3	Ret	11	4	5	1	1	3	8	106
5	(Italy) Maksimilian Popov	5	9	4	7	4	6	8	6	15	62
6	(Switzerland) Enea Frey	4	13†	3	6	7	7	11	5	9	59
7	(Italy) Enzo Yeh	7	6	5	13	12	11	6	7	13	38
8	(Romania) Luca Viișoreanu	8	11	9	5	11	5	Ret	11	6	34
9	(Italy) Emanuele Olivieri	6	12†	6				9	8	5	32
10	(Singapore) Kabir Anurag	Ret	5	Ret	12	13	8	5	9	7	32
11	(Serbia) Andrija Kostić	12†	8	7	9	10	10	4	13	11	26
12	(Finland) Luka Sammalisto				Ret	6	9	Ret	12	4	22
13	(United Kingdom) Reza Seewooruthun				8	8	4				20
14	(Brazil) Gabriel Gomez	9	4	8							18
15	(United Kingdom) Edu Robinson				11	9	3	Ret	15	10	18
16	(Ukraine) Oleksandr Savinkov	10	7	12							7
17	(United States) Hudson Schwartz							7	10	12	7
18	(Italy) Mattia Marchiante	11	10	10				10	14	14	3
19	(United Kingdom) Thomas Bearman				10	Ret	12				1
Pos	Driver	R1	R2	R3	R1	R2	R3	R1	R2	R3	Pts
Pos	Driver	MUG (Italy)			RBR (Austria)			MNZ (Italy)			Pts

=== Teams' championship ===
Pos	Team	Points
1	(Italy) Prema Racing	273
2	(Germany) US Racing	244
3	(Netherlands) Van Amersfoort Racing	153
4	(Germany) PHM AIX Racing	33
5	(Switzerland) Jenzer Motorsport	27
6	(United Kingdom) Hitech Pulse-Eight	4
7	(France) R-ace GP	4
8	(Romania) Real Racing	3
9	(San Marino) AKM Motorsport	2
10	(France) ART Grand Prix	0
11	(Italy) Cram Motorsport	0

== See also ==
- 2024 Italian F4 Championship
