= 2024 Porsche Carrera Cup Italia =

One-make motor racing series in Italy

The 2024 Porsche Carrera Cup Italia was a motor racing event held in Italy. It was the 18th season of the Porsche Carrera Cup Italia. The season began at Misano World Circuit Marco Simoncelli on 3 April and ended at Autodromo Nazionale di Monza on 6 October.

== Calendar ==
Round	Circuit	Date	Supporting	Map of circuit locations
1	Misano World Circuit Marco Simoncelli, Misano Adriatico, Italy	3–5 May	Italian GT Championship; TCR Italy Touring Car Championship; Italian F4 Championship	2024 Porsche Carrera Cup Italia is located in Italy
2	Autodromo Enzo e Dino Ferrari, Imola, Italy	31 May–2 June	Italian GT Championship; Italian F4 Championship; F2000 Italian Formula Trophy; Mini Challenge	2024 Porsche Carrera Cup Italia is located in Italy
3	Mugello Circuit, Scarperia e San Piero, Italy	12–14 July	Italian GT Championship; TCR Italy Touring Car Championship; Italian F4 Championship; Formula Regional European Championship; Campionato Italiano Sport Prototipi	2024 Porsche Carrera Cup Italia is located in Italy
4	Autodromo Enzo e Dino Ferrari, Imola, Italy	6–8 September	Italian GT Championship; TCR Italy Touring Car Championship; Formula Regional European Championship; Campionato Italiano Velocità Autostoriche	2024 Porsche Carrera Cup Italia is located in Italy
5	Vallelunga Circuit, Campagnano di Roma, Italy	20–22 September	TCR Italy Touring Car Championship; Campionato Italiano Sport Prototipi	2024 Porsche Carrera Cup Italia is located in Italy
6	Autodromo Nazionale di Monza, Monza, Italy	4–6 October	Italian GT Championship; Drexler-Automotive Formula Cup; F2000 Italian Formula Trophy; Euro 4 Championship; Campionato Italiano Velocità Autostoriche; Mini Challenge	2024 Porsche Carrera Cup Italia is located in Italy

== Entry list ==
Team	No.	Driver	Class	Rounds
(Italy) Enrico Fulgenzi Racing	1	(Netherlands) Larry ten Voorde	P	1–3, 5–6
(Italy) Enrico Fulgenzi Racing	2	(Netherlands) Sacha Norden	P	2
(Italy) Enrico Fulgenzi Racing	17	(Netherlands) Flynt Schuring	P	1–3, 5–6
(Italy) Enrico Fulgenzi Racing	17	(Netherlands) Sam Jongejan	P	4
(Italy) BeDriver	3	(Italy) Alberto Cerqui	P	All
(Italy) BeDriver	4	(Netherlands) Huub van Eijndhoven	P	6
(Italy) BeDriver	7	(Australia) Bayley Hall	P	All
(Italy) BeDriver	70	(Italy) Gianluca Giorgi	M	1–4
(Italy) Team Q8 Hi-Perform	8	(South Africa) Keagan Masters	P	All
(Italy) Prima Ghinzani Motorsport	10	(Italy) Pietro Armanni	P	All
(Italy) Prima Ghinzani Motorsport	38	(Italy) Simone Iaquinta	P	All
(Italy) Prima Ghinzani Motorsport	55	(Italy) Ilario Introna	M	2, 4
(Italy) Prima Ghinzani Motorsport	55	(Italy) Cosimo Barberini	M	3
(Italy) Prima Ghinzani Motorsport	56	(Italy) Cesare Brusa	M	All
(Italy) Prima Ghinzani Motorsport	69	(Finland) Kalle Rovanperä	P R	6
(Italy) Ombra Racing	11	(United Kingdom) Oliver Gray	P R	2–6
(Italy) Ombra Racing	12	(Germany) Lirim Zendeli	P R	All
(Italy) Ombra Racing	19	(United States) Anthony Imperato	P	1–5
(Italy) Ombra Racing	23	(Italy) Matteo Segre	P R	4
(Italy) Ombra Racing	53	(Japan) Motoki Takami	M	6
(Italy) Scuderia Villorba Corse	14	(Italy) Steven Giacon	P R	All
(Italy) Scuderia Villorba Corse	46	(Italy) Nicolas Pujatti	P R	All
(Italy) Scuderia Villorba Corse	99	(Romania) Horia-Traian Chirigut	M	1, 3–6
(Italy) Dinamic Motorsport	13	(Brazil) Miguel Paludo	P	4
(Italy) Dinamic Motorsport	15	(Italy) Aldo Festante	P	All
(Italy) Dinamic Motorsport	27	(Italy) Lodovico Larini	P	6
(Italy) Dinamic Motorsport	28	(Italy) Francesco Braschi	P R	All
(Italy) Dinamic Motorsport	88	(Italy) Luca Pastorelli	M	1–2
(Italy) Ebimotors	18	(Italy) Cosimo Papi	P R	4, 6
(Italy) Ebimotors	51	(Italy) Paolo Gnemmi	M	All
(Italy) Ebimotors	52	(Italy) Alberto De Amicis	M	All
(Italy) The Driving Experiences	21	(Italy) Diego Bertonelli	P	All
(Italy) The Driving Experiences	25	(Germany) Daniel Gregor	P R	All
(Italy) The Driving Experiences	33	(Austria) Horst Felix Felbermayr	P	1–3, 5–6
(Italy) Target Competition	22	(Netherlands) Senna van Soelen	P R	3
(Italy) Target Competition	22	(Netherlands) Robert de Haan	P R	6
(Italy) Target Competition	26	(France) Marvin Klein	P	All
(Italy) Target Competition	40	(Germany) Janne Stiak	P	1–3, 5–6
(Italy) Target Competition	40	(Belgium) Benjamin Paque	P	4
(Italy) Team Malucelli	24	(Italy) Filippo Fant	P R	All
(Italy) Team Malucelli	54	(Italy) Stefano Stefanelli	M	All
(Italy) Team Malucelli	60	(San Marino) Marco Galassi	M	3, 5
(Italy) Team Malucelli	69	(Italy) Massimiliano Montagnese	M	1–2
(Ukraine) Tsunami RT	32	(Italy) Gianmarco Quaresmini	P	All
(Ukraine) Tsunami RT	67	(Italy) Alex De Giacomi	M	1–5
(Italy) Raptor Engineering	44	(Italy) Flavio Olivieri	P R	All
(Italy) Raptor Engineering	50	(Italy) Francesco Maria Fenici	M	All

Icon	Class
P	Pro Cup
R	Rookie
M	Michelin Cup
	Guest Starter

- Silas Rytter was supposed to compete for Target Competition but did not appear in any round.

== Results ==
Round		Circuit	Pole position	Fastest lap	Overall winner	Winning team	Michelin Cup winner	Rookie winner
1	R1	(Italy) Misano World Circuit Marco Simoncelli	(Netherlands) Larry ten Voorde	(Netherlands) Larry ten Voorde	(Netherlands) Larry ten Voorde	(Italy) Enrico Fulgenzi Racing	(Italy) Luca Pastorelli	(Italy) Francesco Braschi
1	R2	(Italy) Misano World Circuit Marco Simoncelli	(Netherlands) Larry ten Voorde	(South Africa) Keagan Masters	(South Africa) Keagan Masters	(Italy) Team Q8 Hi-Perform	(Italy) Francesco Maria Fenici	(Germany) Lirim Zendeli
2	R1	(Italy) Autodromo Enzo e Dino Ferrari	(Netherlands) Larry ten Voorde	(Netherlands) Larry ten Voorde	(Netherlands) Larry ten Voorde	(Italy) Enrico Fulgenzi Racing	(Italy) Paolo Gnemmi	(Italy) Francesco Braschi
2	R2	(Italy) Autodromo Enzo e Dino Ferrari	(Netherlands) Larry ten Voorde	(Netherlands) Larry ten Voorde	(Netherlands) Larry ten Voorde	(Italy) Enrico Fulgenzi Racing	(Italy) Alex De Giacomi	(Germany) Lirim Zendeli
3	R1	(Italy) Mugello Circuit	(France) Marvin Klein	(Netherlands) Larry ten Voorde	(France) Marvin Klein	(Italy) Target Competition	(Italy) Alberto De Amicis	(Germany) Lirim Zendeli
3	R2	(Italy) Mugello Circuit	(Netherlands) Larry ten Voorde	(France) Marvin Klein	(Netherlands) Larry ten Voorde	(Italy) Enrico Fulgenzi Racing	(Italy) Stefano Stefanelli	(Germany) Lirim Zendeli
4	R1	(Italy) Autodromo Enzo e Dino Ferrari	(Germany) Lirim Zendeli	(South Africa) Keagan Masters	(France) Marvin Klein	(Italy) Target Competition	(Italy) Alberto De Amicis	(Germany) Lirim Zendeli
4	R2	(Italy) Autodromo Enzo e Dino Ferrari	(Germany) Lirim Zendeli	(Italy) Flavio Olivieri	(France) Marvin Klein	(Italy) Target Competition	(Italy) Cesare Brusa	(Italy) Francesco Braschi
5	R1	(Italy) Vallelunga Circuit	(Netherlands) Larry ten Voorde	(Netherlands) Larry ten Voorde	(Netherlands) Flynt Schuring	(Italy) Enrico Fulgenzi Racing	(Italy) Paolo Gnemmi	(Germany) Lirim Zendeli
5	R2	(Italy) Vallelunga Circuit	(Netherlands) Larry ten Voorde	(Netherlands) Larry ten Voorde	(Germany) Janne Stiak	(Italy) Target Competition	(Italy) Francesco Maria Fenici	(Germany) Lirim Zendeli
6	R1	(Italy) Autodromo Nazionale di Monza	(Netherlands) Robert de Haan	(France) Marvin Klein	(Italy) Simone Iaquinta	(Italy) Prima Ghinzani Motorsport	(Italy) Alberto De Amicis	(Germany) Daniel Gregor
6	R2	(Italy) Autodromo Nazionale di Monza	(South Africa) Keagan Masters	(Netherlands) Robert de Haan	(Netherlands) Robert de Haan	(Italy) Target Competition	(Italy) Alberto De Amicis	(United Kingdom) Oliver Gray

== Championship standings ==
=== Scoring system ===
11 best finishes count for the Overall, Michelin Cup and Rookies' classifications.

The points table for Overall classification is as follows:

Position	**1st**	**2nd**	**3rd**	**4th**	**5th**	**6th**	**7th**	**8th**	**9th**	**10th**	**11th**	**12th**	**13th**	**14th**	**15th**	**Pole**	**FL**
Points	25	20	17	14	12	10	9	8	7	6	5	4	3	2	1	2	1

The points table for Michelin Cup classification is as follows:

Position	**1st**	**2nd**	**3rd**	**4th**	**5th**	**6th**	**7th**	**8th**	**9th**	**10th**
Points	15	12	10	8	6	5	4	3	2	1

=== Overall ===
Pos.	Driver	Team	(Italy) MIS		(Italy) IMO1		(Italy) MUG		(Italy) IMO2		(Italy) VAL		(Italy) MON		Points
1	(South Africa) Keagan Masters	(Italy) Team Q8 Hi-Perform	2	1	2	2	5	7	2	3	5	6	2	**3**	206
2	(Netherlands) Larry ten Voorde	(Italy) Enrico Fulgenzi Racing	**1**	**2**	**1**	**1**	2	**1**			**26**	**10**	Ret	6	176
3	(France) Marvin Klein	(Italy) Target Competition	7	26	3	3	**1**	2	1	1	Ret	5	23	2	176
4	(Germany) Lirim Zendeli	(Italy) Ombra Racing	8	3	5	7	3	5	**4**	**7**	3	3	10	7	149
5	(Italy) Diego Bertonelli	(Italy) The Driving Experiences	11	9	9	5	6	13	7	12	4	2	3	21	108
6	(Germany) Janne Stiak	(Italy) Target Competition	12	8	6	4	10	6			11	1	5	5	106
7	(Italy) Simone Iaquinta	(Italy) Prima Ghinzani Motorsport	4	Ret	8	30	8	10	3	5	16	9	1	10	103
8	(Italy) Francesco Braschi	(Italy) Dinamic Motorsport	3	4	4	12	15	18	29	2	9	7	13	Ret	89
9	(Netherlands) Flynt Schuring	(Italy) Enrico Fulgenzi Racing	10	13	20	15	4	3			1	4	Ret	11	85
10	(Italy) Aldo Festante	(Italy) Dinamic Motorsport	5	7	11	6	31	4	10	11	6	11	20	17	76
11	(Australia) Bayley Hall	(Italy) BeDriver	13	11	10	14	14	27	9	6	2	14	9	9	71
12	(Italy) Alberto Cerqui	(Italy) BeDriver	6	6	7	8	11	9	8	10	10	27	17	14	71
13	(Italy) Gianmarco Quaresmini	(Ukraine) Tsunami RT	9	5	16	11	7	12	14	9	8	17	4	Ret	68
14	(United Kingdom) Oliver Gray	(Italy) Ombra Racing			15	Ret	9	8	22	4	7	8	12	4	65
15	(Germany) Daniel Gregor	(Italy) The Driving Experiences	15	10	14	9	12	14	15	8	15	25	7	15	42
16	(Netherlands) Robert de Haan	(Italy) Target Competition											**Ret**	1	28
17	(Italy) Nicolas Pujatti	(Italy) Scuderia Villorba Corse	25	14	26	24	21	17	6	18	12	28	11	13	24
18	(Italy) Pietro Armanni	(Italy) Prima Ghinzani Motorsport	16	12	13	10	32	16	11	26	Ret	23	14	16	20
19	(Finland) Kalle Rovanperä	(Italy) Prima Ghinzani Motorsport											6	8	18
20	(Austria) Horst Felix Felbermayr	(Italy) The Driving Experiences	14	15	12	31	29	15			13	12	Ret	Ret	15
21	(Belgium) Benjamin Paque	(Italy) Target Competition							5	30					12
22	(Netherlands) Huub van Eijndhoven	(Italy) BeDriver											8	12	12
23	(Italy) Flavio Olivieri	(Italy) Raptor Engineering	Ret	Ret	19	13	Ret	20	13	24	14	Ret	Ret	20	9
24	(Netherlands) Senna van Soelen	(Italy) Target Competition					13	11							8
25	(Netherlands) Sam Jongejan	(Italy) Enrico Fulgenzi Racing							12	29					4
26	(Italy) Filippo Fant	(Italy) Team Malucelli	20	17	18	23	18	19	17	15	18	13	16	18	4
27	(United States) Anthony Imperato	(Italy) Ombra Racing	Ret	18	29	26	24	25	25	13	21	24			3
28	(Italy) Cesare Brusa	(Italy) Prima Ghinzani Motorsport	Ret	22	23	27	27	28	26	14	27	DNS	Ret	26	2
29	(Italy) Steven Giacon	(Italy) Scuderia Villorba Corse	27	16	17	16	17	29	27	23	Ret	19	15	Ret	1
30	(Italy) Francesco Maria Fenici	(Italy) Raptor Engineering	18	19	25	22	22	26	20	16	19	15	21	24	1
31	(Italy) Alberto De Amicis	(Italy) Ebimotors	29	20	Ret	19	16	22	19	17	20	18	18	22	0
32	(Italy) Alex De Giacomi	(Ukraine) Tsunami RT	26	24	28	17	19	24	Ret	21	22	16			0
33	(Brazil) Miguel Paludo	(Italy) Dinamic Motorsport							16	25					0
34	(Italy) Paolo Gnemmi	(Italy) Ebimotors	21	23	21	21	23	23	24	19	17	21	25	25	0
35	(Italy) Luca Pastorelli	(Italy) Dinamic Motorsport	17	21	24	29									0
36	(Italy) Gianluca Giorgi	(Italy) BeDriver	19	25	22	18	25	Ret	Ret	DNS					0
37	(Italy) Cosimo Papi	(Italy) Ebimotors							18	27			19	23	0
38	(Italy) Lodovico Larini	(Italy) Dinamic Motorsport											Ret	19	0
39	(Romania) Horia-Traian Chirigut	(Italy) Scuderia Villorba Corse	24	Ret			30	30	21	20	24	20	26	29	0
40	(Italy) Stefano Stefanelli	(Italy) Team Malucelli	22	Ret	27	25	20	21	Ret	DNS	23	26	22	27	0
41	(Netherlands) Sacha Norden	(Italy) Enrico Fulgenzi Racing			Ret	20									0
42	(Italy) Ilario Introna	(Italy) Prima Ghinzani Motorsport			30	28			23	22					0
43	(San Marino) Marco Galassi	(Italy) Team Malucelli					28	32			25	22			0
44	(Italy) Massimiliano Montagnese	(Italy) Team Malucelli	23	Ret	Ret	DNS									0
45	(Japan) Motoki Takami	(Italy) Ombra Racing											24	28	0
46	(Italy) Cosimo Barberini	(Italy) Prima Ghinzani Motorsport					26	31							0
47	(Italy) Matteo Segre	(Italy) Ombra Racing							28	28					0
Pos.	Driver	Team	(Italy) MIS		(Italy) IMO1		(Italy) MUG		(Italy) IMO2		(Italy) VAL		(Italy) MON		Points

Colour	Result
Gold	Winner
Silver	Second place
Bronze	Third place
Green	Points classification
Blue	Non-points classification
Blue	Non-classified finish (NC)
Purple	Retired, not classified (Ret)
Red	Did not qualify (DNQ)
Red	Did not pre-qualify (DNPQ)
Black	Disqualified (DSQ)
White	Did not start (DNS)
White	Withdrew (WD)
White	Race cancelled (C)
Blank	Did not practice (DNP)
Blank	Did not arrive (DNA)
Blank	Excluded (EX)

**Bold** – Pole
Italics – Fastest Lap
† — Did not finish, but classified
Rookie

=== Michelin Cup ===
Pos.	Driver	Team	(Italy) MIS		(Italy) IMO1		(Italy) MUG		(Italy) IMO2		(Italy) VAL		(Italy) MON		Points
1	(Italy) Francesco Maria Fenici	(Italy) Raptor Engineering	2	1	5	5	4	5	2	2	2	1	2	2	128
2	(Italy) Alberto De Amicis	(Italy) Ebimotors	9	2	Ret	3	1	2	1	3	3	3	1	1	126
3	(Italy) Paolo Gnemmi	(Italy) Ebimotors	4	5	1	4	5	3	5	4	1	5	5	3	104
4	(Italy) Alex De Giacomi	(Ukraine) Tsunami RT	8	6	7	1	2	4	Ret	6	4	2			72
5	(Italy) Stefano Stefanelli	(Italy) Team Malucelli	5	Ret	6	6	3	1	Ret	DNS	5	7	3	5	67
6	(Italy) Cesare Brusa	(Italy) Prima Ghinzani Motorsport	Ret	4	3	7	8	6	6	1	8	DNS	Ret	4	61
7	(Romania) Horia-Traian Chirigut	(Italy) Scuderia Villorba Corse	7	Ret			10	7	3	5	6	4	6	7	47
8	(Italy) Gianluca Giorgi	(Italy) BeDriver	3	7	2	2	6	Ret	Ret	DNS					43
9	(Italy) Luca Pastorelli	(Italy) Dinamic Motorsport	1	3	4	9									35
10	(Italy) Ilario Introna	(Italy) Prima Ghinzani Motorsport			8	8			4	7					18
11	(Japan) Motoki Takami	(Italy) Ombra Racing											4	6	13
12	(San Marino) Marco Galassi	(Italy) Team Malucelli					9	9			7	6			13
13	(Italy) Cosimo Barberini	(Italy) Prima Ghinzani Motorsport					7	8							7
14	(Italy) Massimiliano Montagnese	(Italy) Team Malucelli	6	Ret	Ret	DNS									5
Pos.	Driver	Team	(Italy) MIS		(Italy) IMO1		(Italy) MUG		(Italy) IMO2		(Italy) VAL		(Italy) MON		Points

=== Teams ===
Pos.	Team	Points
1	(Italy) Target Competition	321
2	(Italy) Enrico Fulgenzi Racing	261
3	(Italy) Ombra Racing	240
4	(Italy) Dinamic Motorsport	197
5	(Italy) The Driving Experiences	188
6	(Italy) BeDriver	179
7	(Italy) Prima Ghinzani Motorsport	172
8	(Ukraine) Tsunami RT	84
9	(Italy) Scuderia Villorba Corse	41
10	(Italy) Raptor Engineering	16
11	(Italy) Team Malucelli	12
12	(Italy) Ebimotors	5
