= Tomass Štolcermanis =

Latvian racing driver (born 2007)

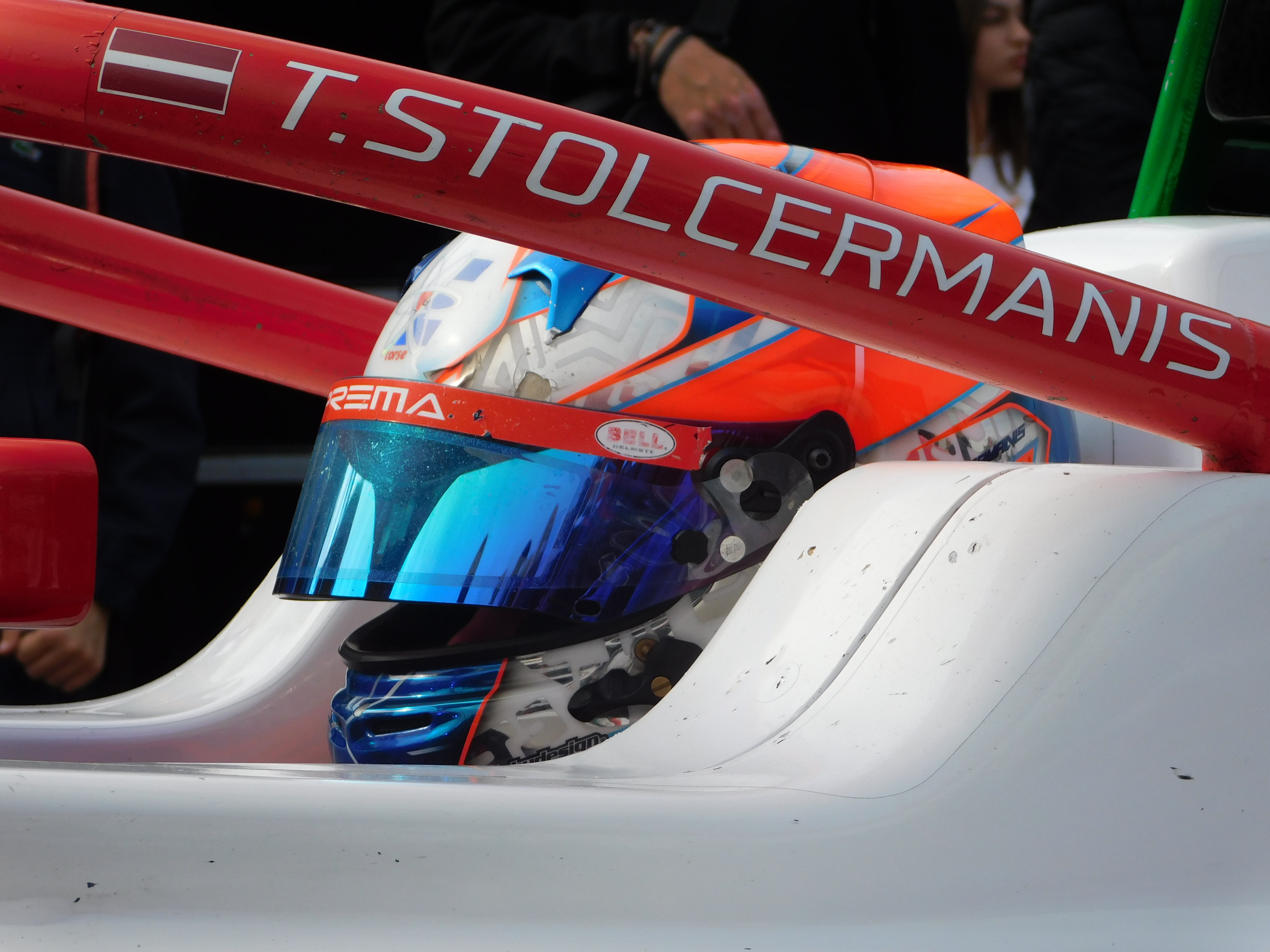
- Štolcermanis in 2024
- Nationality: (Latvia) Latvian
- Born: 28 May 2007 (age 19) Ropazi, Latvia

Formula Regional European Championship career
- Debut season: 2025
- Current team: Prema Racing
- Car number: 60
- Former teams: RPM
- Starts: 21
- Wins: 0
- Podiums: 0
- Poles: 0
- Fastest laps: 0
- Best finish: 17th in 2026

Previous series
- 2026 2025 2024–2025 2024 2023: UAE4 Series; F4 Middle East; Italian F4; F4 UAE; F4 SEA
- Statistics up to date as of 17 September 2026.

Tomass Štolcermanis (born 28 May 2007) is a Latvian racing driver who last competed in the Formula Regional European Championship for Prema Racing.

== Personal life ==
Štolcermanis' godfather is Harald Schlegelmilch, a former racing driver who competed in GP2 Asia in 2010.

== Career ==
=== Karting (2017–2023) ===
Štolcermanis began karting at the age of three, competing full-time until 2023. Mostly racing in the Baltic states in his first years in karting, Štolcermanis won the 2016 Latvian Republic Championship in Micro Max, before stepping up to junior karts and winning the 2019 Latvian Karting Championship and the 2021 Rotax Max Challenge Grand Finals.

Štolcermanis stepped up to senior karting in 2022. In his rookie year in Senior karts, he began the year by winning the Champions of the Future Winter Series, before then winning the WSK Open Cup in OK and the SKUSA SuperNationals in the KA100 Senior class. Continuing in OK for 2023, Štolcermanis most notably finished third in the WSK Champions Cup, a year in which he also made select appearances in KZ2, finishing third in the Karting European Championship and seventh in the World Cup. Towards the end of his karting career, Štolcermanis attended the Ferrari Driver Academy.

=== Formula 4 (2023–2026) ===
In late 2023, Štolcermanis made his single-seater debut driving for Prema Racing in the first Sepang round of the Formula 4 South East Asia Championship. In the three races, Štolcermanis scored a best result of third in race three.

Remaining with Prema Racing for his maiden full season in single-seaters the following year, Štolcermanis began the year by racing in the last two rounds of the Formula 4 UAE Championship. Racing at Yas Marina and Dubai, Štolcermanis scored a best result of second in the reverse-grid race of the latter round. Staying with Prema for the rest of the year, Štolcermanis raced with them in both the Italian F4 and Euro 4 Championships. In the former, he scored his only podium of the season by finishing third in race three at Le Castellet, en route to a ninth-place points finish. In Euro 4, Štolcermanis took his maiden podium by finishing second in race one at the Red Bull Ring and scoring pole for race two, before ending the season with a third-place finish in race one at Monza and securing fifth in the overall standings.

For his sophomore year in Formula 4, Štolcermanis began 2025 by racing for Prema-run Mumbai Falcons Racing in the newly rebranded F4 Middle East Championship. In the five-round winter series, Štolcermanis scored his maiden win in single-seaters in the first Yas Marina round and took four more podiums to secure fourth in points. Remaining with Prema for his sophomore season in Italian F4, Štolcermanis raced in the first two rounds, taking a second-place finish at Vallelunga before parting ways with the team ahead of the round in Monza. Four months after his last appearance in single-seaters, Štolcermanis joined AKM Motorsport for a one-off appearance at the Mugello round of the E4 Championship, in which he scored a best result of seventh in race three.

In early 2026, Štolcermanis made a one-off return to Formula 4 competition, racing at the season-ending Lusail round of the UAE4 Series for PHM Racing, in which he finished second in race two.

=== Formula Regional (2025–present) ===
Towards the end of 2025, Štolcermanis stepped up to the Formula Regional European Championship, joining Race Performance Motorsport for the season-ending round at Monza. On his series debut, Štolcermanis scored a best result of ninth in race two, but wasn't eligible to score points as he was a guest driver.

The following year, Štolcermanis returned to Prema Racing for his maiden full-time season in the Formula Regional European Championship, as a late replacement for Sebastian Wheldon. In his rookie season, Štolcermanis took a best result of fourth at Imola and four other points finishes to round out the season 17th overall.

== Karting record ==
=== Karting career summary ===
Season	Series	Team	Position
2017	South Garda Winter Cup — Mini ROK	Energy Corse	30th
2017	RMC Grand Finals — Mini Max	333 Autosport	10th
2018	Hungarian International Open Championship — Mini Max	Mareks Štolcermanis	19th
2018	ROK Cup International Final — Mini ROK		29th
2018	RMC Grand Finals — Mini Max	Mareks Štolcermanis	9th
2019	RMC Grand Finals — Junior Max	RM Latvia	21st
2020	Rotax Max Euro Winter Cup — Junior Max	RM Latvia	37th
2021	Rotax Max Euro Trophy — Junior Max	GKS Lemmens Power	32nd
2021	Champions of the Future — OK-J	Energy Corse	10th
2021	CIK-FIA European Championship — OK-J	Energy Corse	11th
2021	WSK Euro Series — OK-J	Energy Corse	49th
2021	IAME Euro Series — X30 Junior	Energy Corse	12th
2021	WSK Open Cup — OK-J	Energy Corse	14th
2021	CIK-FIA World Championship — OK-J	Energy Corse	5th
2021	South Garda Winter Cup — OK-J	Energy Corse	31st
2021	WSK Final Cup — OK-J	Energy Corse	NC
2021	BNL Series — Junior Max		9th
2021	RMC Grand Finals — Junior Max	RM Latvia	1st
2022	WSK Super Master Series — OK-J	Energy Corse	26th
2022	Champions of the Future Winter Series — OK	Energy Corse	1st
2022	WSK Super Master Series — OK	Energy Corse	8th
2022	Champions of the Future — OK	Energy Corse	3rd
2022	CIK-FIA European Championship — OK	Energy Corse	7th
2022	WSK Euro Series — OK	Energy Corse	4th
2022	CIK-FIA World Championship — OK	Energy Corse	7th
2022	WSK Open Cup — OK	Energy Corse	1st
2022	WSK Final Cup — OK	Energy Corse	12th
2022	Estonian Championship — DD2		10th
2022	SKUSA SuperNationals — KA100 Senior	Nash Motorsports	1st
2022	SKUSA SuperNationals — X30 Senior	Nash Motorsports	2nd
2023	WSK Champions Cup — OK	Energy Corse	3rd
2023	WSK Super Master Series — OK	Energy Corse	5th
2023	Champions of the Future — OK	Energy Corse	6th
2023	Road to Wackersdorf — KZ2	Energy Corse	1st
2023	CIK-FIA European Championship — OK	Energy Corse	4th
2023	CIK-FIA European Championship — KZ2	Energy Corse	3rd
2023	WSK Open Series — KZ2	Energy Corse	19th
2023	WSK Euro Series — OK	Energy Corse	4th
2023	Karting World Cup — KZ2	Energy Corse	7th
2023	CIK-FIA World Championship — OK	Energy Corse	31st
2025	Champions of the Future — KZ2	Energy Corse	122nd

== Racing record ==
=== Racing career summary ===
Season	Series	Team	Races	Wins	Poles	F/Laps	Podiums	Points	Position
2023	Formula 4 South East Asia Championship	Prema Racing	3	0	0	0	1	35	12th
2024	Formula 4 UAE Championship	Prema Racing	6	0	0	0	1	19	18th
2024	Italian F4 Championship	Prema Racing	21	0	0	1	1	97	9th
2024	Euro 4 Championship	Prema Racing	9	0	1	0	2	83	5th
2025	F4 Middle East Championship	Mumbai Falcons Racing Limited	15	1	0	1	5	212	4th
2025	Italian F4 Championship	Prema Racing	6	0	0	0	1	60	11th
2025	E4 Championship	AKM Motorsport	3	0	0	0	0	6	16th
2025	Formula Regional European Championship	RPM	2	0	0	0	0	0	NC†
2026	UAE4 Series	PHM Racing	3	0	0	0	1	20	17th
2026	Formula Regional European Championship	Prema Racing	19	0	0	0	0	32	17th

* Season still in progress.

=== Complete Formula 4 South East Asia Championship results ===
(key) (Races in bold indicate pole position; races in italics indicate fastest lap)

Year	Entrant	1	2	3	4	5	6	7	8	9	10	11	Pos	Points
2023	Prema Racing	ZZIC1; 1	ZZIC1; 2	ZZIC1; 3	MAC; 1	MAC; 2	SEP1; 1; 6	SEP1; 2; 4	SEP1; 3; 3	SEP2; 1	SEP2; 2	SEP2; 3	12th	35

=== Complete Formula 4 UAE Championship results ===
(key) (Races in bold indicate pole position; races in italics indicate fastest lap)

Year	Team	1	2	3	4	5	6	7	8	9	10	11	12	13	14	15	DC	Points
2024	Prema Racing	YMC1; 1	YMC1; 2	YMC1; 3	YMC2; 1	YMC2; 2	YMC2; 3	DUB1; 1	DUB1; 2	DUB1; 3	YMC3; 1; 25	YMC3; 2; 16	YMC3; 3 Ret	DUB2; 1; 10	DUB2; 2; 2	DUB2; 3 Ret	18th	19

=== Complete Italian F4 Championship results ===
(key) (Races in bold indicate pole position; races in italics indicate fastest lap)

Year	Team	1	2	3	4	5	6	7	8	9	10	11	12	13	14	15	16	17	18	19	20	21	22	23	24	25	DC	Points
2024	Prema Racing	MIS; 1; 9	MIS; 2; 8	MIS; 3; 14	IMO; 1; 5	IMO; 2; 4	IMO; 3; 8	VLL; 1; 8	VLL; 2; 4	VLL; 3; 12	MUG; 1; 7	MUG; 2; 9	MUG; 3; 9	LEC; 1; 10	LEC; 2 Ret	LEC; 3; 3	CAT; 1 Ret	CAT; 2; 8	CAT; 3; 5	MNZ; 1; 14	MNZ; 2; 6	MNZ; 3; 10					9th	97
2025	Prema Racing	MIS1; 1; 4	MIS1; 2; 5	MIS1; 3	MIS1; 4; 6	VLL; 1; 2	VLL; 2; 4	VLL; 3	VLL; 4 Ret	MNZ; 1	MNZ; 2	MNZ; 3	MUG; 1	MUG; 2	MUG; 3	IMO; 1	IMO; 2	IMO; 3	CAT; 1	CAT; 2	CAT; 3	MIS2; 1	MIS2; 2	MIS2; 3	MIS2; 4	MIS2; 5	11th	60

=== Complete Euro 4 / E4 Championship results ===
(key) (Races in bold indicate pole position; races in italics indicate fastest lap)

Year	Team	1	2	3	4	5	6	7	8	9	DC	Points
2024	Prema Racing	MUG; 1 Ret	MUG; 2; 7	MUG; 3; 5	RBR; 1; 2	**RBR**; **2**; 5	RBR; 3; 6	MNZ; 1; 3	MNZ; 2; 5	MNZ; 3; 8	5th	81
2025	AKM Motorsport	LEC; 1	LEC; 2	LEC; 3	MUG; 1; 18	MUG; 2; 18	MUG; 3; 7	MNZ; 1	MNZ; 2	MNZ; 3	16th	6

=== Complete F4 Middle East Championship / UAE4 Series results ===
(key) (Races in bold indicate pole position; races in italics indicate fastest lap)

Year	Team	1	2	3	4	5	6	7	8	9	10	11	12	13	14	15	DC	Points
2025	Mumbai Falcons Racing Limited	YMC1; 1; 8	YMC1; 2; 1	YMC1; 3; 3	YMC2; 1; 2	YMC2; 2; 6	YMC2; 3; 13	DUB; 1; 2	DUB; 2; 4	DUB; 3; 5	YMC3; 1; 4	YMC3; 2; 10	YMC3; 3; 2	LUS; 1; 4	LUS; 2; 5	LUS; 3; 6	4th	212
2026	PHM Racing	YMC1; 1	YMC1; 2	YMC1; 3	YMC2; 1	YMC2; 2	YMC2; 3	DUB; 1	DUB; 2	DUB; 3	LUS; 1; 9	LUS; 2; 2	LUS; 3 Ret				17th	20

=== Complete Formula Regional European Championship results ===
(key) (Races in bold indicate pole position) (Races in italics indicate fastest lap)

Year	Team	1	2	3	4	5	6	7	8	9	10	11	12	13	14	15	16	17	18	19	20	DC	Points
2025	RPM	MIS; 1	MIS; 2	SPA; 1	SPA; 2	ZAN; 1	ZAN; 2	HUN; 1	HUN; 2	LEC; 1	LEC; 2	IMO; 1	IMO; 2	RBR; 1	RBR; 2	CAT; 1	CAT; 2	HOC; 1	HOC; 2	MNZ; 1 Ret	MNZ; 2; 9	NC†	0
2026	Prema Racing	RBR; 1; 23	RBR; 2; 14	RBR; 3; 20	ZAN; 1 DSQ	ZAN; 2; 7	SPA; 1; 16	SPA; 2 C	SPA; 3; 27	MNZ; 1; 17	MNZ; 2; 7	MNZ; 3; 18	HUN; 1; 5	HUN; 2 Ret	LEC; 1; 14	LEC; 2; 11	IMO; 1 Ret	IMO; 2; 11	IMO; 3; 4	HOC; 1 Ret	HOC; 2 Ret	17th	32

† As Štolcermanis was a guest driver, he was ineligible for points.
