= 2024 F2000 Italian Formula Trophy =

Motor racing championship

The 2024 Zinox Laser F2000 Italian Formula Trophy was a multi-event open-wheel single seater motor racing championship. This was the eleventh season of the series, featuring a mix of professional and amateur drivers competing in different classes and using multiple kinds of Formula 3- and Formula Renault-level machinery. The championship continued its cooperation with the Drexler-Automotive Formula Cup, with the two series sharing grids and race slots on multiple race weekends.

Franz Wöss Racing's Benjámin Berta won the F2000 Trophy, but had to concede victory in the top-level Super Formula Class to G Motorsport's Francesco Galli, while Viola Formula Racing's Emir Tanju was the overall winner in the F2.0 Cup and with it also won the F2.0 Open Class. Sandro Zeller (Jo Zeller Racing), Ahmad Shaheen Al Muhannadi (Puresport), Giovanni Giordano (Giordano Motorsport), Luca Iannacone (Neri Autosport), Sergio Conti (ASD Ruote Scoperte M.) and Fabio Turchetto (ASD Ruote Scoperte M.) also took titles in their respective classes. Franz Wöss Racing and Viola Formula Racing took the Teams' Championships in the F2000 Trophy and the F2.0 Cup, respectively.

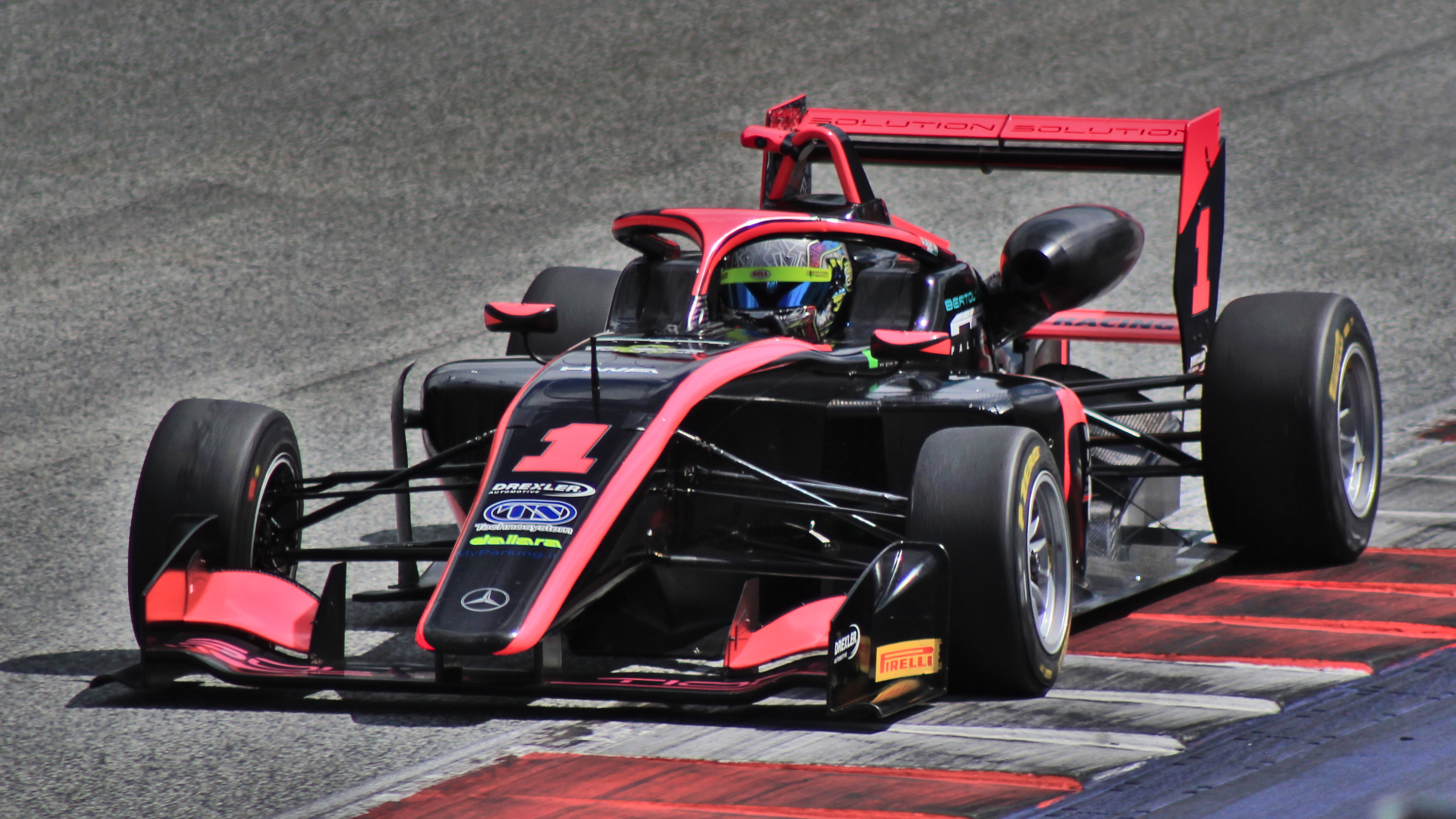
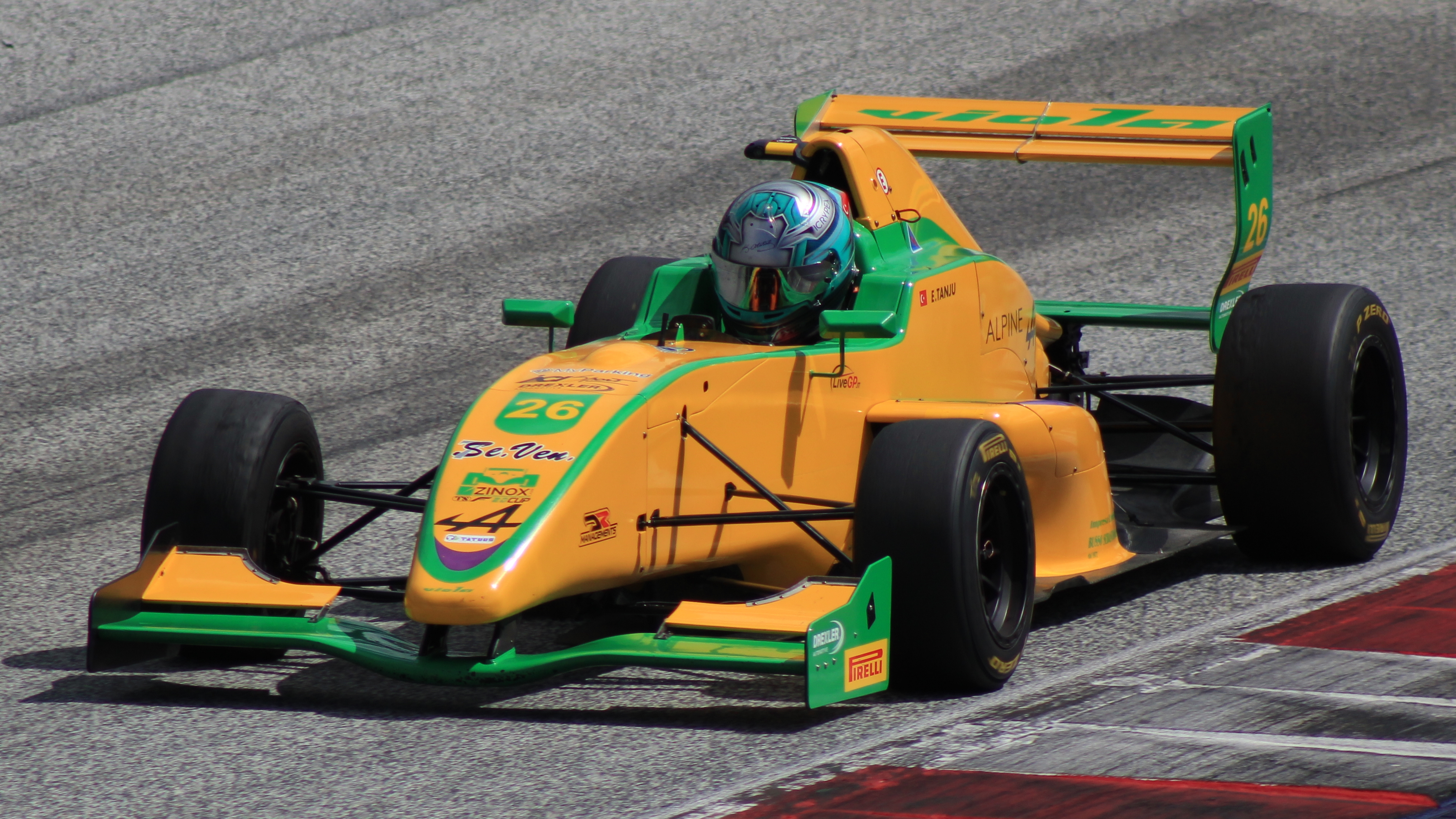
Benjámin Berta (Franz Wöss Racing, top) and Emir Tanju (Viola Formula Racing, bottom) became champions in the F2000 Trophy and the F2.0 Cup.

== Teams and drivers ==
Teams and drivers competing in the F2000 Trophy were divided into four classes: Platinum, Gold, Silver and Bronze ranked the field based on the cars' age and technical characteristics as well as the drivers' experience. For competition in the F2.0 Cup, the field was divided into Pro and Light entries.

=== F2000 Trophy entries ===
Team	No.	Driver	Car	Engine	Rounds
Super Formula Class entries
(Austria) Franz Wöss Racing	1	(Hungary) Benjámin Berta	Dallara F320	Mercedes	All
(Austria) Franz Wöss Racing	19	(Republic of Ireland) Cian Carey	Dallara F320		6
(Austria) Franz Wöss Racing	20	(Denmark) Stig Larsen	Dallara F320	Mercedes HWA	All
(Italy) Puresport	8	(Italy) Dino Rasero	Dallara F320	Mercedes HWA	1, 3–7
(Czech Republic) Stkmelnik.cz	65	(Czech Republic) Roman Roubícek	Dallara F320		5–7
(Italy) TVS Motorsport	69	(Italy) Enzo Stentella	Dallara F320	BMW	1
(Italy) G Motorsport	131	(Italy) Francesco Galli	Dallara F320	Volkswagen	All
(Serbia) ASU NV Racing	212	(Serbia) Paolo Brajnik	Dallara F320		5
Platinum Class entries
(Italy) Viola Formula Racing	2	(Italy) Laurence Balestrini	Dallara F317		5–6
(Italy) Puresport	12	(Switzerland) Christof Ledermann	Dallara F309	Power Engine	1
(Italy) Puresport	14	(Italy) Andrea Benalli	Dallara F317	Mercedes HWA	1–3, 5–6
(Germany) Team Hoffmann Racing	22	(Germany) André Petropoulos	Dallara F316	Opel Spiess	2
(Austria) Franz Wöss Racing	32	(Canada) Victor Smialek	Dallara F316	Mercedes HWA	All
(Italy) Facondini Racing	41	(Italy) Franco Cimarelli	Dallara F312	Volkswagen	1, 3, 6–7
(Italy) Facondini Racing	88	(Italy) Francesco Solfaroli	Dallara F317	Toyota	1, 3–4, 6–7
(Switzerland) Jo Zeller Racing	44	(Switzerland) Sandro Zeller	Dallara F312	Mercedes HWA	All
(Switzerland) Jo Zeller Racing	56	(Switzerland) Thomas Zeltner	Dallara F314		5
(Italy) Team Automobile Tricolore	46	(Italy) Riccardo Perego	Dallara F317	Volkswagen	All
(Italy) One Competition	69	(Italy) Enzo Stentella	Dallara F317		4–7
Racing in Italy	75	(Israel) Mei Shibi	Dallara F308	Volkswagen	1–3, 6
(Italy) Emotion Motorsport	83	(Italy) Daniele Radrizzani	Dallara F317	Toyota	2–3, 6
Gold Class entries
(Switzerland) Jo Zeller Racing	2	(Switzerland) Urs Rüttimann	Dallara F308		4, 6
(Italy) Puresport	5	(Italy) Giorgio Venica	Dallara F308	Power Engine	3
(Italy) Puresport	12	(Switzerland) Christof Ledermann	Tatuus F3 T-318	Alfa Romeo	2–6
(Italy) Puresport	33	(Qatar) Ahmad Shaheen Al Muhannadi	Dallara F312	Volkswagen	1–6
(Italy) Facondini Racing	6	(Italy) Enrico Milani	Dallara F308	Fiat FTP	1, 3–4
(France) Neri Autosport	10	(Italy) Luca Iannacone	Dallara F312	Toyota	3
(Germany) Team Hoffmann Racing	22	(Germany) André Petropoulos	Dallara F316	Opel Spiess	5
(Italy) One Competition	23	(Italy) Federico Porri	Dallara F308		7
(Italy) Team Automobile Tricolore	39	(Italy) Edoardo Bonanomi	Dallara F312	Mercedes HWA	All
(Italy) ASD Autodromos - Nannini Racing	42	(Italy) Davide Pedetti	Dallara F317	Toyota	1–4
(Italy) ASD Autodromos - Nannini Racing	43	(Italy) Giancarlo Pedetti	Dallara F316	Toyota	All
(Italy) TVS Motorsport	69	(Italy) Enzo Stentella	Dallara F302	BMW	2–3
(France) Sud Motorsport	90	(Italy) Antonio Rinaldi	Dallara F302		3
(Italy) Corbetta Racing	93	(Italy) Antonio Montruccoli	Dallara F3		7
Silver Class entries
(Italy) Giordano Motorsport	9	(Italy) Giovanni Giordano	Dallara F308	Fiat FTP	All
(Italy) ASD Living KC	21	(Italy) Umberto Vaglio	Dallara F308	Toyota	3, 5–7
(Italy) One Competition	23	(Italy) Federico Porri	Dallara F308		4
(Italy) Derva Corse ASD	24	(Italy) Marco de Toffol	Dallara F308	Fiat FTP	1–2
(Italy) Bellspeed	27	(Italy) Patrick Bellezza	Dallara F300	Fiat Novamotor	1, 3, 6–7
(Italy) BMG Racing	28	(Italy) Giorgio Berto	Dallara F308	Fiat FTP	1, 6
(France) Sud Motorsport	66	(Italy) Salvatore Marinaro	Dallara F310		4
(Italy) Facondini Racing	96	(Germany) Oliver Kratsch	Dallara F308	Toyota	1–4, 7
Bronze Class entries
(France) Neri Autosport	10	(Italy) Luca Iannacone	Dallara F308	Toyota	2, 5, 7
Formula Entry Class entries
(Italy) Team Racing Gubbio	12	(Italy) Lorenzo Mariani	Tatuus F4-T014		7
(Italy) Scuderia Cirelli	16	(Italy) Sara Fruncillo	Tatuus F4-T014		5
(Italy) Scuderia Cirelli	17	(Italy) Tony di Giulio	Tatuus F4-T014	Abarth	1
(Italy) ASD Ruote Scoperte M.	34	(Italy) Sergio Conti	Tatuus F4-T014	Abarth	2–3, 5–6

=== F2.0 Cup entries ===
All drivers competed driving Tatuus FR2.0 cars with Renault engines.

Team	No.	Driver	Rounds
Light Class entries
(Italy) Alpha Team Racing	3	(Italy) Giancarlo de Virgilis	3
(Italy) Alpha Team Racing	3	(Italy) Sandro de Virgilis	6
(France) Sud Motorsport	22	(France) Bruno Mottez	3
(Italy) Team HARS	71	(Italy) Luca Guolo	3
(Italy) ASD Ruote Scoperte M.	79	(Italy) Fabio Turchetto	3, 6
(France) Neri Autosport	94	(France) Arthur Fouche	5
Open Class entries
(Italy) Speed Motor	7	(Italy) Karim Sartori	1–3, 5–7
(Italy) GTM Motorsport	18	(Italy) Domenico Terron	5, 7
(France) Morel Auto Racing	22	(France) Tristan Morel	2
(Italy) Viola Formula Racing	25	(France) Valentin Andreiux	1–3, 6
(Italy) Viola Formula Racing	26	(Turkey) Emir Tanju	1–3, 5–7
(Italy) Viola Formula Racing	67	(Italy) Alessandro Zucco	5–7
(Italy) Derva Corse ASD	40	(Italy) Andrea Cavigioli	3, 5
(Italy) Derva Corse ASD	95	(Italy) Stefano Noal	3, 5, 7
(France) STAC	91	(France) Jérémy Clavaud	3, 5–6
(Italy) Team Perodi	92	(Italy) Romano Cataldo	1, 5–6

== Race calendar ==
The 2024 calendar was announced in early 2024. The round at Circuit de Spa-Francorchamps was replaced by a round at Monza Circuit, leaving the championship with only a single round abroad Italy.

Race weekend held races of the FR2.0 Cup

Round		Circuit	Date	Support bill	Map of circuit locations
1	R1	(Italy) Vallelunga Circuit, Campagnano di Roma	21 April	TCR World Tour; TCR Europe Touring Car Series	2024 F2000 Italian Formula Trophy is located in Italy
1	R2	(Italy) Vallelunga Circuit, Campagnano di Roma	21 April	TCR World Tour; TCR Europe Touring Car Series	2024 F2000 Italian Formula Trophy is located in Italy
2	R1	(Austria) Red Bull Ring, Spielberg	18 May	Eurocup-3; TCR Eastern Europe Trophy	2024 F2000 Italian Formula Trophy is located in Italy
2	R2	(Austria) Red Bull Ring, Spielberg	19 May	Eurocup-3; TCR Eastern Europe Trophy	2024 F2000 Italian Formula Trophy is located in Italy
3	R1	(Italy) Imola Circuit, Imola	1 June	Italian GT Championship; Porsche Carrera Cup Italia	2024 F2000 Italian Formula Trophy is located in Italy
3	R2	(Italy) Imola Circuit, Imola	2 June	Italian GT Championship; Porsche Carrera Cup Italia	2024 F2000 Italian Formula Trophy is located in Italy
4	R1	(Italy) Vallelunga Circuit, Campagnano di Roma	15 June	Italian GT Championship; Italian Sport Prototype Championship	2024 F2000 Italian Formula Trophy is located in Italy
4	R2	(Italy) Vallelunga Circuit, Campagnano di Roma	16 June	Italian GT Championship; Italian Sport Prototype Championship	2024 F2000 Italian Formula Trophy is located in Italy
5	R1	(Italy) Mugello Circuit, Scarperia e San Piero	24 August	Euro 4 Championship; Italian GT Championship	2024 F2000 Italian Formula Trophy is located in Italy
5	R2	(Italy) Mugello Circuit, Scarperia e San Piero	25 August	Euro 4 Championship; Italian GT Championship	2024 F2000 Italian Formula Trophy is located in Italy
6	R1	(Italy) Monza Circuit, Monza	5 October	Italian GT Championship; Porsche Carrera Cup Italia	2024 F2000 Italian Formula Trophy is located in Italy
6	R2	(Italy) Monza Circuit, Monza	6 October	Italian GT Championship; Porsche Carrera Cup Italia	2024 F2000 Italian Formula Trophy is located in Italy
7	R1	(Italy) Misano World Circuit Marco Simoncelli, Misano Adriatico	3 November	BOSS GP; Mitjet Italia Racing Series	2024 F2000 Italian Formula Trophy is located in Italy
7	R2	(Italy) Misano World Circuit Marco Simoncelli, Misano Adriatico	3 November	BOSS GP; Mitjet Italia Racing Series	2024 F2000 Italian Formula Trophy is located in Italy

== Race results ==
=== F2000 Trophy results ===
Round		Circuit	Pole position	Super Formula winner	Platinum winner	Gold winner	Silver winner	Bronze winner	Formula Entry winner
1	R1	(Italy) Vallelunga Circuit	(Italy) Francesco Galli	(Italy) Francesco Galli	(Switzerland) Sandro Zeller	(Italy) Davide Pedetti	(Italy) Giovanni Giordano	no entries	no finishers
1	R2	(Italy) Vallelunga Circuit		(Italy) Francesco Galli	(Italy) Riccardo Perego	(Italy) Davide Pedetti	(Germany) Oliver Kratsch	no entries	no finishers
2	R1	(Austria) Red Bull Ring	(Hungary) Benjámin Berta	(Italy) Francesco Galli	(Switzerland) Sandro Zeller	(Qatar) Ahmad Shaheen Al Muhannadi	(Germany) Oliver Kratsch	no starters	(Italy) Sergio Conti
2	R2	(Austria) Red Bull Ring		(Hungary) Benjámin Berta	(Switzerland) Sandro Zeller	(Qatar) Ahmad Shaheen Al Muhannadi	(Italy) Marco de Toffol	no starters	(Italy) Sergio Conti
3	R1	(Italy) Imola Circuit	(Hungary) Benjámin Berta	(Hungary) Benjámin Berta	(Switzerland) Sandro Zeller	(Qatar) Ahmad Shaheen Al Muhannadi	(Italy) Giovanni Giordano	no entries	(Italy) Sergio Conti
3	R2	(Italy) Imola Circuit		(Italy) Francesco Galli	(Switzerland) Sandro Zeller	(Qatar) Ahmad Shaheen Al Muhannadi	(Italy) Giovanni Giordano	no entries	(Italy) Sergio Conti
4	R1	(Italy) Vallelunga Circuit	(Italy) Francesco Galli	(Italy) Francesco Galli	(Canada) Victor Smialek	(Qatar) Ahmad Shaheen Al Muhannadi	(Italy) Giovanni Giordano	no entries	no entries
4	R2	(Italy) Vallelunga Circuit		(Italy) Francesco Galli	(Switzerland) Sandro Zeller	(Qatar) Ahmad Shaheen Al Muhannadi	(Germany) Oliver Kratsch	no entries	no entries
5	R1	(Italy) Mugello Circuit	(Hungary) Benjámin Berta	(Serbia) Paolo Brajnik	(Switzerland) Sandro Zeller	(Italy) Edoardo Bonanomi	(Italy) Umberto Vaglio	(Italy) Luca Iannacone	(Italy) Sergio Conti
5	R2	(Italy) Mugello Circuit		(Hungary) Benjámin Berta	(Switzerland) Sandro Zeller	(Italy) Edoardo Bonanomi	(Italy) Umberto Vaglio	(Italy) Luca Iannacone	(Italy) Sergio Conti
6	R1	(Italy) Monza Circuit	(Hungary) Benjámin Berta	(Hungary) Benjámin Berta	(Canada) Victor Smialek	(Switzerland) Urs Rüttimann	(Italy) Patrick Bellezza	no entries	(Italy) Sergio Conti
6	R2	(Italy) Monza Circuit		(Italy) Francesco Galli	(Switzerland) Sandro Zeller	(Qatar) Ahmad Shaheen Al Muhannadi	(Italy) Patrick Bellezza	no entries	(Italy) Sergio Conti
7	R1	(Italy) Misano Circuit	(Canada) Victor Smialek	(Hungary) Benjámin Berta	(Canada) Victor Smialek	(Italy) Edoardo Bonanomi	(Germany) Oliver Kratsch	(Italy) Luca Iannacone	no starters
7	R2	(Italy) Misano Circuit		(Hungary) Benjámin Berta	(Switzerland) Sandro Zeller	(Italy) Edoardo Bonanomi	(Italy) Giovanni Giordano	(Italy) Luca Iannacone	no starters

=== F2.0 Cup results ===
Round		Circuit	Pole position	Light Class winner	Open Class winner
1	R1	(Italy) Vallelunga Circuit	(Turkey) Emir Tanju	no entries	(Turkey) Emir Tanju
1	R2	(Italy) Vallelunga Circuit		no entries	(Turkey) Emir Tanju
2	R1	(Austria) Red Bull Ring	(Italy) Karim Sartori	no entries	(France) Valentin Andreiux
2	R2	(Austria) Red Bull Ring		no entries	(Italy) Karim Sartori
3	R1	(Italy) Imola Circuit	(Italy) Karim Sartori	(Italy) Fabio Turchetto	(Italy) Karim Sartori
3	R2	(Italy) Imola Circuit		(Italy) Fabio Turchetto	(Italy) Karim Sartori
4	R1	(Italy) Mugello Circuit	(France) Jérémy Clavaud	(France) Arthur Fouche	(France) Jérémy Clavaud
4	R2	(Italy) Mugello Circuit		no finishers	(France) Jérémy Clavaud
5	R1	(Italy) Monza Circuit	(France) Valentin Andreiux	(Italy) Fabio Turchetto	(France) Valentin Andreiux
5	R2	(Italy) Monza Circuit		(Italy) Fabio Turchetto	(France) Valentin Andreiux
6	R1	(Italy) Misano Circuit	(Turkey) Emir Tanju	no entries	(Italy) Karim Sartori
6	R2	(Italy) Misano Circuit		no entries	(Turkey) Emir Tanju

== Season report ==
=== First half ===
The 2024 F2000 Italian Formula Trophy commenced at Vallelunga, where Francesco Galli of G Motorsports secured pole position. Despite initially falling to third behind Benjámin Berta of Franz Wöss Racing and Sandro Zeller of Jo Zeller Racing, Galli quickly reclaimed the lead and won the opening race. In the second race, Galli maintained his lead from the start, successfully fending off Berta to win again. Zeller retired due to a puncture, which allowed Riccardo Perego of Team Automobile Tricolore to secure third. In the F2.0 Cup, Emir Tanju of Viola Formula Racing achieved back-to-back wins, with both Tanju and Galli emerging as early championship leaders in their respective categories.

During the second round at the Red Bull Ring, Berta secured pole position. Galli had a stronger start, overtaking Berta immediately and securing his third consecutive race victory, with Zeller finishing third. In the second race, Galli initially fell to fourth before veering off track and retiring. This left Zeller and Berta in contention for the win. Berta overtook Zeller outside the track limits, resulting in a time penalty that ultimately awarded Zeller the victory. Franz Wöss Racing’s Victor Smialek claimed third overall, while the F2.0 Cup victories were shared by Karim Sartori of Speed Motor and Valentin Andreiux of Viola Formula Racing. Tanju and Galli retained their respective class leads.

In the third round at Imola Circuit, Berta secured pole position once again. He engaged in a close battle with Galli through the opening part of the race, until the latter went off track, ultimately retiring after his car became stuck. This incident enabled Berta to take the victory ahead of Zeller and Smialek, propelling him to the top of the championship standings. In the second race, Zeller started from pole position and successfully held off challenges from Galli and Berta through an early safety car period, a restart, and the remainder of the race. In the F2.0 class, Tanju and Sartori each claimed a win, allowing Tanju to maintain his championship lead unchanged.

Galli was back in front in qualifying at the series’ return to Vallelunga. The first race saw both Berta and Zeller jump the start, resulting in penalties that allowed Galli to take a dominant and uncontested victory. Smialek and Perego joined him on the podium. In the second race, an intense battle for the lead unfolded between Galli and Berta, with Galli successfully defending against repeated challenges to secure his second win of the weekend. Zeller finished third, having bided his time for any mistakes from the front runners. Galli left Vallelunga back in the championship lead, while the F2.0 Cup skipped the event, leaving its points standings unchanged.

=== Second half ===
Mugello hosted the fifth round of the championship, where Berta secured pole position. In the opening race, Berta defended his lead from Galli, but a collision between the two title rivals resulted in Berta retiring with a puncture and Galli pitting for repairs. This saw Zeller win, finishing ahead of Smialek and NV Racing's one-off competitor Paolo Brajnik. In the second race, Galli stalled at the start, allowing Berta to win ahead of Zeller and Smialek after a race largely run under yellow. Galli came sixth, handing the championship lead back to Berta. The F2.0 Cup was back in action, with STAC's Jérémy Clavaud securing both wins, while a retirement for Tanju allowed Sartori to take the class points lead.

In the penultimate round at the Monza Circuit, Berta secured another pole position during qualifying. He maintained his lead to achieve a lights-to-flag victory despite two safety car restarts. Galli, initially in second, was involved in a collision with Franz Wöss Racing’s Cian Carey, dropping him to fourth and allowing Smialek and Zeller to claim podium finishes. In the second race, Smialek briefly led at the start but was overtaken and finished fourth, with Galli taking the victory ahead of Berta and Zeller. Andreiux dominated the weekend in the F2.0 Cup, winning both races. The championship standings shifted again as this time, Sartori managed to finish only one race, narrowing his lead over Tanju.

Smialek secured a surprise pole position for the season finale at Misano, which he converted into a victory as Berta and Galli engaged in a race-long battle for second place. Berta ultimately prevailed, setting up a decisive final race for the championship. Berta started that race from pole position, while Galli needed to finish ahead of him to contend for the championship. However, the Hungarian driver delivered a flawless performance, claiming the win and the championship title. Galli finished fourth behind Zeller and Smialek after incurring a penalty. The F2.0 Cup took more dramatic turns, as Sartori and Tanju each won a race while the other retired. That saw Tanju clinch the title by eight points.

Galli secured six victories compared to Berta's four, but the Hungarian driver demonstrated superior consistency by finishing in the top two in all but the dropped-score races. In contrast, Galli's results included three podium misses that were counted, giving Berta the edge needed to claim his maiden Italian F2000 championship. The F2.0 Cup featured a closely contested season-long rivalry between newcomer Tanju and returning competitor Sartori, with neither able to establish a clear dominance.

== Standings ==
=== Scoring system ===
Drivers scored points in the overall standings, as well as in separate standings per class. Five points were awarded to each driver attending an event. Claiming the fastest lap per race per class awarded a point if at least three cars took part in a class. Entrants counted the best eleven race results of their campaign, as well as the attendance points for all race weekends.

Position	1st	2nd	3rd	4th	5th	6th	7th	8th	9th	10th
Points	25	18	15	12	10	8	6	4	2	1

=== Drivers' standings ===
==== Overall standings ====
Pos	Driver	VLL1 (Italy)		RBR (Austria)		IMO (Italy)		VLL2 (Italy)		MUG (Italy)		MNZ (Italy)		MIS (Italy)		Pts
Pos	Driver	R1	R2	R1	R2	R1	R2	R1	R2	R1	R2	R1	R2	R1	R2	Pts
1	(Hungary) Benjámin Berta	2	2	**2**	2	**1**	(3)	(8)	2	(**Ret**)	1	**1**	2	2	1	267
2	(Italy) Francesco Galli	**1**	1	1	(Ret)	(Ret)	2	**1**	1	(12)	6	4	1	3	4	255
3	(Switzerland) Sandro Zeller	3	(23)	3	1	2	1	(10)	3	1	2	3	3	(4)	2	239
4	(Canada) Victor Smialek	(13)	(4)	4	3	3	(5)	2	4	2	3	2	4	**1**	3	211
5	(Denmark) Stig Larsen	(8)	(12)	5	6	6	7	5	5	7	4	(Ret)	7	6	5	129
6	(Italy) Riccardo Perego	4	3	15	5	4	4	3	(Ret)	9	7	Ret	Ret	(WD)	(WD)	114
7	(Italy) Enzo Stentella	7	6	16	15	(17)	(28)	9	6	4	5	11	(Ret)	9	7	89
8	(Italy) Andrea Benalli	5	5	17	4	5	6			8	10	Ret	6			88
9	(Italy) Dino Rasero	6	20			8	9	4	12	6	8	6	(26)	5	19	86
10	(Qatar) Ahmad Shaheen Al Muhannadi	18	24	6	7	7	8	6	7	Ret	(DNS)	8	9			75
11	(Italy) Edoardo Bonanomi	16	9	(Ret)	(DNS)	28	32	12	(Ret)	10	9	14	13	10	8	45
12	(Czech Republic) Roman Roubícek									5	Ret	12	14	7	6	39
13	(Italy) Davide Pedetti	10	8	Ret	8	Ret	27	7	8							39
14	(Italy) Francesco Solfaroli	9	7			10	10	11	10			18	18	13	9	38
15	(Germany) Oliver Kratsch	20	10	8	12	13	24	Ret	9					8	Ret	37
16	(Italy) Giancarlo Pedetti	(Ret)	17	11	(DNS)	19	19	17	14	11	23	21	(Ret)	15	15	35
17	(Turkey) Emir Tanju	14	14	10	16	15	12			18	(Ret)	17	17	Ret	10	32
18	(Israel) Mei Shibi	19	Ret	7	9	9	11					DSQ	WD			30
19	(Italy) Giovanni Giordano	11	19	(Ret)	11	12	17	14	17	21	Ret	(WD)	(WD)	11	12	30
20	(Switzerland) Christof Ledermann	15	15	13	13	(Ret)	21	16	18	19	17	16	11			30
21	(Italy) Karim Sartori	17	18	12	14	14	13			17	12	13	25	12	(Ret)	30
22	(Italy) Franco Cimarelli	WD	WD			27	DNS					5	8	Ret	Ret	29
23	(France) Valentin Andreiux	Ret	16	9	DNS	Ret	14					9	12			26
24	(Serbia) Paolo Brajnik									3	DNS					20
25	(Italy) Umberto Vaglio					16	18			16	15	DNS	WD	Ret	13	20
26	(Italy) Sergio Conti			18	17	26	31			27	21	24	23			20
27	(Italy) Luca Iannacone			DNS	DNS	Ret	Ret			26	20			18	16	20
28	(Switzerland) Urs Rüttimann							13	11			7	Ret			16
29	(Italy) Alessandro Zucco									15	13	10	15	16	11	16
30	(Republic of Ireland) Cian Carey											25	5			15
31	(France) Jérémy Clavaud					22	22			14	11	DNS	Ret			15
32	(Italy) Enrico Milani	12	13			21	16	15	13							15
33	(Italy) Patrick Bellezza	WD	WD			DNS	WD					20	16	14	Ret	15
34	(Italy) Stefano Noal					20	23			22	Ret			17	14	15
35	(Italy) Romano Cataldo	Ret	22							24	18	Ret	21			15
36	(Italy) Daniele Radrizzani			19	DNS	DNS	WD					22	20			15
37	(Italy) Marco de Toffol	Ret	11	Ret	10											12
38	(Italy) Laurence Balestrini									20	14	15	10			11
39	(Italy) Federico Porri							18	16					21	Ret	10
40	(Italy) Fabio Turchetto					18	20					19	19			10
41	(Italy) Andrea Cavigioli					Ret	25			25	19					10
42	(Italy) Giorgio Berto	Ret	21									DNS	22			10
43	(Italy) Giorgio Venica					11	15									5
44	(Switzerland) Thomas Zeltner									13	16					5
45	(France) Tristan Morel			14	16											5
46	(Italy) Salvatore Marinaro							19	15							5
47	(Italy) Antonio Montruccoli													20	17	5
48	(Italy) Domenico Terron									WD	WD			19	18	5
49	(Italy) Sara Fruncillo									28	22					5
50	(Italy) Sandro de Virgilis											23	24			5
51	(Italy) Luca Guolo					23	26									5
52	(France) Arthur Fouche									23	Ret					5
=53	(France) Bruno Mottez					24	29									5
=53	(Germany) André Petropoulos			WD	WD					29	24					5
55	(Italy) Giancarlo de Virgilis					25	30									5
56	(Italy) Tony di Giulio	Ret	DNS													5
—	(Italy) Antonio Rinaldi					WD	WD									0
—	(Italy) Lorenzo Mariani													WD	WD	0
Pos	Driver	R1	R2	R1	R2	R1	R2	R1	R2	R1	R2	R1	R2	R1	R2	Pts
Pos	Driver	VLL1 (Italy)		RBR (Austria)		IMO (Italy)		VLL2 (Italy)		MUG (Italy)		MNZ (Italy)		MIS (Italy)		Pts

Key
Colour	Result
Gold	Winner
Silver	Second place
Bronze	Third place
Green	Other points position
Blue	Other classified position
Blue	Not classified, finished (NC)
Purple	Not classified, retired (Ret)
Red	Did not qualify (DNQ)
Red	Did not pre-qualify (DNPQ)
Black	Disqualified (DSQ)
White	Did not start (DNS)
White	Race cancelled (C)
Blank	Did not practice (DNP)
Blank	Excluded (EX)
Blank	Did not arrive (DNA)
Blank	Withdrawn (WD)
Blank	Did not enter (cell empty)
Text formatting	Meaning
**Bold**	Pole position
Italics	Fastest lap

==== F2000 standings per class ====
Pos	Driver	VLL1 (Italy)		RBR (Austria)		IMO (Italy)		VLL2 (Italy)		MUG (Italy)		MNZ (Italy)		MIS (Italy)		Pts
Pos	Driver	R1	R2	R1	R2	R1	R2	R1	R2	R1	R2	R1	R2	R1	R2	Pts
Super Formula Class
1	(Italy) Francesco Galli	**1**	1	1	(Ret)	(Ret)	1	**1**	1	(5)	3	2	1	2	2	285
2	(Hungary) Benjámin Berta	(2)	2	**2**	1	**1**	2	(4)	2	(**Ret**)	1	**1**	2	1	1	280
3	(Denmark) Stig Larsen	(5)	(4)	3	2	2	3	3	3	4	2	(Ret)	4	4	3	200
4	(Italy) Dino Rasero	3	5			3	4	2	5	3	4	3	(6)	3	5	154
5	(Czech Republic) Roman Roubícek									2	Ret	4	5	5	4	77
6	(Italy) Enzo Stentella	4	3													32
7	(Serbia) Paolo Brajnik									1	DNS					30
8	(Republic of Ireland) Cian Carey											5	3			30
Platinum Class
1	(Switzerland) Sandro Zeller	1	(6)	1	1	1	1	(4)	1	1	1	2	1	(2)	1	318
2	(Canada) Victor Smialek	(5)	1	(2)	2	2	(3)	1	2	2	2	1	2	**1**	2	257
3	(Italy) Riccardo Perego	2	2	4	4	3	2	2	(Ret)	5	4	Ret	Ret	(WD)	(WD)	168
4	(Italy) Andrea Benalli	3	3	5	3	4	4			4	5	Ret	3			139
5	(Italy) Francesco Solfaroli	4	4			6	5	5	4			6	6	4	4	132
6	(Italy) Enzo Stentella							3	3	3	3	4	Ret	3	3	122
7	(Israel) Mei Shibi	7	Ret	3	5	5	6					DSQ	WD			71
8	(Italy) Franco Cimarelli	WD	WD			7	DNS					3	4	Ret	Ret	53
9	(Italy) Laurence Balestrini									7	6	5	5			44
10	(Italy) Daniele Radrizzani			DNS	DNS	DNS	WD					7	7			22
11	(Italy) Federico Porri													5	Ret	20
12	(Switzerland) Thomas Zeltner									6	7					19
13	(Switzerland) Christof Ledermann	6	5													17
—	(Germany) André Petropoulos			WD	WD											0
Gold Class
1	(Qatar) Ahmad Shaheen Al Muhannadi	4	5	1	1	1	1	1	1	Ret	(DNS)	2	1			250
2	(Italy) Edoardo Bonanomi	3	2	(Ret)	(DNS)	6	8	3	(Ret)	1	1	3	3	1	1	236
3	(Italy) Giancarlo Pedetti	(Ret)	4	2	(DNS)	4	4	7	5	2	3	5	(Ret)	2	2	190
4	(Switzerland) Christof Ledermann			3	3	Ret	5	6	6	3	2	4	2			141
5	(Italy) Davide Pedetti	1	1	Ret	2	Ret	6	2	2							132
6	(Italy) Enrico Milani	2	3			5	3	5	4							96
7	(Switzerland) Urs Rüttimann							4	3			1	Ret			63
8	(Italy) Enzo Stentella			4	4	3	7									61
9	(Italy) Giorgio Venica					2	2									41
10	(Italy) Antonio Montruccoli													3	3	35
11	(Germany) André Petropoulos									4	4					30
12	(Italy) Luca Iannacone					Ret	Ret									5
—	(Italy) Antonio Rinaldi					WD	WD									0
Silver Class
1	(Italy) Giovanni Giordano	1	3	(Ret)	2	1	1	1	4	2	Ret	(WD)	(WD)	2	1	232
2	(Germany) Oliver Kratsch	2	1	1	3	2	3	Ret	1					1	Ret	199
3	(Italy) Umberto Vaglio					3	2			1	1	DNS	WD	Ret	2	121
4	(Italy) Patrick Bellezza	WD	WD			DNS	WD					1	1	3	Ret	80
5	(Italy) Marco de Toffol	Ret	2	Ret	1											54
6	(Italy) Giorgio Berto	Ret	4									DNS	2			40
=7	(Italy) Federico Porri							2	3							38
=7	(Italy) Salvatore Marinaro							3	2							38
Bronze Class
1	(Italy) Luca Iannacone			DNS	DNS					1	1			1	1	105
Formula Entry Class
1	(Italy) Sergio Conti			1	1	1	1			1	1	1	1			220
2	(Italy) Sara Fruncillo									2	2					41
3	(Italy) Tony di Giulio	Ret	DNS													5
—	(Italy) Lorenzo Mariani													WD	WD	0
Pos	Driver	R1	R2	R1	R2	R1	R2	R1	R2	R1	R2	R1	R2	R1	R2	Pts
Pos	Driver	VLL1 (Italy)		RBR (Austria)		IMO (Italy)		VLL2 (Italy)		MUG (Italy)		MNZ (Italy)		MIS (Italy)		Pts

==== F2.0 Cup standings per class ====
Pos	Driver	VLL (Italy)		RBR (Austria)		IMO (Italy)		MUG (Italy)		MNZ (Italy)		MIS (Italy)		Pts
Pos	Driver	R1	R2	R1	R2	R1	R2	R1	R2	R1	R2	R1	R2	Pts
Overall
1	(Turkey) Emir Tanju	**1**	1	2	2	2	1	4	Ret	4	3	**Ret**	1	230
2	(Italy) Karim Sartori	2	2	**3**	1	**1**	2	3	2	3	Ret	1	Ret	222
3	(France) Valentin Andreiux	Ret	3	1	DNS	Ret	3			1	1			140
4	(Italy) Alessandro Zucco							2	3	2	2	2	2	121
5	(France) Jérémy Clavaud					5	5	**1**	1	DNS	Ret			86
6	(Italy) Stefano Noal					4	6	5	Ret			3	3	75
7	(Italy) Fabio Turchetto					3	4			5	4			60
8	(Italy) Romano Cataldo	Ret	4					7	4	Ret	5			55
9	(France) Tristan Morel			4	3									32
10	(Italy) Andrea Cavigioli					Ret	7	8	5					30
11	(Italy) Sandro de Virgilis									6	6			21
12	(Italy) Domenico Terron							WD	WD			Ret	4	17
13	(Italy) Luca Guolo					6	8							17
14	(France) Arthur Fouche							6	Ret					13
15	(France) Bruno Mottez					7	9							13
16	(Italy) Giancarlo de Virgilis					8	10							10
Light Class
1	(Italy) Fabio Turchetto					1	1			1	1			113
=2	(Italy) Luca Guolo					2	2							41
=2	(Italy) Sandro de Virgilis									2	2			41
4	(France) Bruno Mottez					3	3							35
5	(France) Arthur Fouche							1	Ret					30
6	(Italy) Giancarlo de Virgilis					4	4							29
Open Class
1	(Turkey) Emir Tanju	1	1	2	2	2	1	4	Ret	4	3	Ret	1	230
2	(Italy) Karim Sartori	2	2	3	1	1	2	3	2	3	Ret	1	Ret	222
3	(France) Valentin Andreiux	Ret	3	1	DNS	Ret	3			1	1			140
4	(Italy) Alessandro Zucco							2	3	2	2	2	2	121
5	(France) Jérémy Clavaud					4	4	1	1	DNS	Ret			90
6	(Italy) Stefano Noal					3	5	5	Ret			3	3	80
7	(Italy) Romano Cataldo	Ret	4					6	4	Ret	4			59
8	(Italy) Andrea Cavigioli					Ret	6	7	5					34
9	(France) Tristan Morel			4	3									32
10	(Italy) Domenico Terron							WD	WD			Ret	4	17
Pos	Driver	R1	R2	R1	R2	R1	R2	R1	R2	R1	R2	R1	R2	Pts
Pos	Driver	VLL (Italy)		RBR (Austria)		IMO (Italy)		MUG (Italy)		MNZ (Italy)		MIS (Italy)		Pts

=== Teams' standings ===
==== F2000 Trophy ====
Pos	Team	Pts
1	(Austria) Franz Wöss Racing	521.6
2	(Switzerland) Jo Zeller Racing	279
3	(Italy) G Motorsport	261.4
4	(Italy) Puresport	225
5	(Italy) Team Automobile Tricolore	145
6	(Italy) Facondini Racing	100.2
7	(Italy) ASD Autodromos - Nannini Racing	74
8	(Italy) Viola Formula Racing	70.2
9	(Italy) One Competition	59.4
10	(Czech Republic) Stkmelnik.cz	41.8
11	(Italy) Derva Corse ASD	37
12	(France) Neri Autosport	35
13	(Italy) Giordano Motorsport	31.2
14	(Italy) Speed Motor	30
15	(Italy) TVS Motorsport	29
16	Racing in Italy	25
17	(Italy) ASD Ruote Scoperte M.	20
18	(Italy) ASD Living KC	20
19	(Italy) Bellspeed	15
20	(Italy) Team Perodi	15
21	(France) STAC	15
22	(Italy) BMG Racing	10
23	(Italy) Scuderia Cirelli	10
24	(Italy) Alpha Team Racing	10
25	(Italy) Team HARS	5
26	(France) Sud Motorsport	5
—	(Germany) Team Hoffmann Racing	0
—	(Italy) Emotion Motorsport	0
—	(France) Morel Auto Racing	0
—	(Serbia) ASU NV Racing	0
—	(Italy) GTM Motorsport	0
—	(Italy) Team Racing Gubbio	0
—	(Italy) Corbetta Racing	0
Pos	Team	Pts

==== F2.0 Cup ====
Pos	Team	Pts
1	(Italy) Viola Formula Racing	451
2	(Italy) Speed Motor	224
3	(Italy) Derva Corse ASD	105
4	(France) STAC	86
5	(Italy) ASD Ruote Scoperte M.	60
6	(France) Neri Autosport	58
7	(Italy) Team Perodi	55
8	(Italy) Alpha Team Racing	31
9	(Italy) GTM Motorsport	29
10	(Italy) Team HARS	17
—	(France) Morel Auto Racing	0
—	(France) Sud Motorsport	0
—	(France) Neri Autosport	0
Pos	Team	Pts
