= List of 2023 motorsport champions =

2023 motorsport champions
Previous: 2022	Next: 2024

This list of 2023 motorsport champions is a list of national or international motorsport series with championships decided by the points or positions earned by a driver from multiple races where the season was completed during the 2023 calendar year.

== Dirt oval racing ==
Series	Champion	Refer
Lucas Oil Late Model Dirt Series	(United States) Hudson O'Neal	
World of Outlaws Late Model Series	(United States) Bobby Pierce	
World of Outlaws Sprint Car Series	(United States) Brad Sweet	
World of Outlaws Sprint Car Series	Teams: (United States) Kasey Kahne Racing	

== Drag racing ==
Series	Champion	Refer
NHRA Camping World Drag Racing Series	Top Fuel: (United States) Doug Kalitta	2023 NHRA Camping World Drag Racing Series
NHRA Camping World Drag Racing Series	Funny Car: (United States) Matt Hagan	2023 NHRA Camping World Drag Racing Series
NHRA Camping World Drag Racing Series	Pro Stock: (United States) Erica Enders	2023 NHRA Camping World Drag Racing Series
NHRA Camping World Drag Racing Series	Pro Stock Motorcycle: (United States) Gaige Herrera	2023 NHRA Camping World Drag Racing Series
European Drag Racing Championship	Top Fuel: (Finland) Ida Zetterström	
European Drag Racing Championship	Top Methanol: (Norway) Linn Floysvik	
European Drag Racing Championship	Pro Stock Car: (Sweden) Michael Malmgren	
European Drag Racing Championship	Pro Stock Modified: (Sweden) Jan Ericsson	

== Drift ==
Series	Champion	Refer
D1 Grand Prix	(Japan) Hideyuki Fujino	2023 D1 Grand Prix series
D1 Grand Prix	D1 Lights: (Japan) Hisato Yonai	2023 D1 Grand Prix series
D1NZ	(New Zealand) Daniel Woolhouse	2023 D1NZ season
D1NZ	Pro-Sport: (New Zealand) Kase Pullen-Burry	2023 D1NZ season
Drift Masters	(Republic of Ireland) Conor Shanahan	2023 Drift Masters
Drift Masters	Nations Cup: (Republic of Ireland) Ireland	2023 Drift Masters
Formula Drift	(United States) Chelsea DeNofa	2023 Formula Drift season
Formula Drift	Auto Cup: (United States) Ford	2023 Formula Drift season
Formula Drift	Tire Cup: (Singapore) GT Radial	2023 Formula Drift season

== Karting ==
Series	Driver	Season article
Karting World Championship	OK: Kirill Kutskov	
Karting World Championship	KZ: (Italy) Paolo Ippolito	
Karting World Championship	OKJ: (Belgium) Dries Van Langendonck	
Karting World Championship	KZ2: (Germany) Niels Tröger	
CIK-FIA Karting Academy Trophy	(Spain) Hugo Martí	2023 CIK-FIA Karting Academy Trophy
CIK-FIA Karting European Championship	OK: (Netherlands) René Lammers	
CIK-FIA Karting European Championship	OK-J: (Ukraine) Oleksandr Bondarev	
CIK-FIA Karting European Championship	KZ: (Italy) Danilo Albanese	
CIK-FIA Karting European Championship	KZ2: (United Kingdom) Freddie Slater	
WSK Champions Cup	KZ2: (Italy) Cristian Bertuca	
WSK Champions Cup	OK: (Ukraine) Oleksandr Bondarev	
WSK Champions Cup	OKJ: (United Kingdom) Lewis Wherrell	
WSK Euro Series	OK: Kirill Kutskov	
WSK Euro Series	OKJ: (Italy) Iacopo Martinese	
WSK Euro Series	60 Mini: (Romania) Bogdan Cosma Cristofor	
Rotax Max Challenge	DD2: (Estonia) Ragnar Veerus	
Rotax Max Challenge	DD2 Masters: (Canada) Ben Cooper	
Rotax Max Challenge	Senior: (Serbia) Andrej Petrović	
Rotax Max Challenge	Junior: (United Kingdom) Timo Jüngling	
Rotax Max Challenge	Mini: (United Kingdom) Rory Armstrong	
Rotax Max Challenge	Micro: (United Kingdom) Jenson Chalk	
Rotax Max Challenge	Nations Cup: United Kingdom	

== Motorcycle racing ==
Series	Champion	Refer
FIM MotoGP World Championship	(Italy) Francesco Bagnaia	2023 MotoGP World Championship
FIM MotoGP World Championship	Teams: (Italy) Prima Pramac Racing	2023 MotoGP World Championship
FIM MotoGP World Championship	Constructors: (Italy) Ducati	2023 MotoGP World Championship
FIM Moto2 World Championship	(Spain) Pedro Acosta	2023 Moto2 World Championship
FIM Moto2 World Championship	Teams: (Finland) Red Bull KTM Ajo	2023 Moto2 World Championship
FIM Moto2 World Championship	Constructors: (Germany) Kalex	2023 Moto2 World Championship
FIM Moto3 World Championship	(Spain) Jaume Masià	2023 Moto3 World Championship
FIM Moto3 World Championship	Teams: (Germany) Liqui Moly Husqvarna Intact GP	2023 Moto3 World Championship
FIM Moto3 World Championship	Constructors: (Austria) KTM	2023 Moto3 World Championship
MotoE	(Italy) Mattia Casadei	2023 MotoE World Championship
MotoE	Teams: (Spain) HP Pons Los40	2023 MotoE World Championship
FIM Moto2 European Championship	(Australia) Senna Agius	2023 FIM Moto2 European Championship
FIM Moto2 European Championship	Manufacturers: (Germany) Kalex	2023 FIM Moto2 European Championship
FIM JuniorGP World Championship	(Spain) Ángel Piqueras	2023 FIM JuniorGP World Championship
FIM JuniorGP World Championship	Manufacturers: (Austria) KTM	2023 FIM JuniorGP World Championship
Asia Road Racing Championship	ASBK 1000: (Germany) Markus Reiterberger	2023 Asia Road Racing Championship
Asia Road Racing Championship	ASBK 1000 Teams: (Malaysia) ONEXOX BMW TKKR Team	2023 Asia Road Racing Championship
Asia Road Racing Championship	ASBK 1000 Manufacturers: (Germany) BMW	2023 Asia Road Racing Championship
Asia Road Racing Championship	Supersports 600: (Japan) Soichiro Minamimoto	2023 Asia Road Racing Championship
Asia Road Racing Championship	Supersports 600 Teams: (Singapore) Boon Siew Honda Racing Team A	2023 Asia Road Racing Championship
Asia Road Racing Championship	Supersports 600 Manufacturers: (Japan) Honda	2023 Asia Road Racing Championship
Asia Road Racing Championship	AP 250: (Indonesia) Rheza Danica Ahrens	2023 Asia Road Racing Championship
Asia Road Racing Championship	AP 250 Teams: (Indonesia) ASTRA Honda Racing Team A	2023 Asia Road Racing Championship
Asia Road Racing Championship	AP 250 Manufacturers: (Japan) Honda	2023 Asia Road Racing Championship
Asia Road Racing Championship	UB 150: (Malaysia) Nazirul Izzat Bahauddin	2023 Asia Road Racing Championship
Asia Road Racing Championship	UB 150 Teams: (Malaysia) UMA Racing YAMAHA Maju Motor Asia	2023 Asia Road Racing Championship
Asia Road Racing Championship	UB 150 Manufacturers: (Japan) Yamaha	2023 Asia Road Racing Championship
Asia Road Racing Championship	TVS Asia One Make: (Malaysia) Muzakkir Mohamed	2023 Asia Road Racing Championship
Australian Superbike Championship	(Australia) Troy Herfoss	
British Superbike Championship	(United Kingdom) Tommy Bridewell	2023 British Superbike Championship
British Supersport Championship	(Australia) Ben Currie	2023 British Supersport Championship
MotoAmerica Superbike Championship	(United States) Jake Gagne	2023 MotoAmerica Superbike Championship
MotoAmerica Superbike Championship	Superbike Cup: (United States) Nolan Lamkin	2023 MotoAmerica Superbike Championship
Red Bull MotoGP Rookies Cup	(Spain) Ángel Piqueras	2023 Red Bull MotoGP Rookies Cup
Superbike World Championship	(Spain) Álvaro Bautista	2023 Superbike World Championship
Superbike World Championship	Teams: (Italy) Aruba.it Racing – Ducati	2023 Superbike World Championship
Superbike World Championship	Manufacturers: (Italy) Ducati	2023 Superbike World Championship
Supersport World Championship	(Italy) Nicolò Bulega	2023 Supersport World Championship
Supersport World Championship	Teams: (Netherlands) Ten Kate Racing Yamaha	2023 Supersport World Championship
Supersport World Championship	Manufacturers: (Italy) Ducati	2023 Supersport World Championship
Supersport 300 World Championship	(Netherlands) Jeffrey Buis	2023 Supersport 300 World Championship
Supersport 300 World Championship	Teams: (Belgium) MTM Kawasaki	2023 Supersport 300 World Championship
Supersport 300 World Championship	Manufacturers: (Japan) Kawasaki	2023 Supersport 300 World Championship

=== Motocross ===
Series	Champion	Refer
FIM Motocross World Championship	(Spain) Jorge Prado	2023 FIM Motocross World Championship
FIM Motocross World Championship	Manufacturers: (Japan) Yamaha	2023 FIM Motocross World Championship
FIM Motocross World Championship	MX2: (Italy) Andrea Adamo	2023 FIM Motocross World Championship
FIM Motocross World Championship	MX2 Manufacturers: (Japan) Yamaha	2023 FIM Motocross World Championship
FIM Women's Motocross World Championship	(New Zealand) Courtney Duncan	2023 FIM Women's Motocross World Championship
FIM Women's Motocross World Championship	Manufacturers: (Japan) Kawasaki	2023 FIM Women's Motocross World Championship
FIM Enduro World Championship	EnduroGP: (United Kingdom) Steve Holcombe	2023 FIM Enduro World Championship
FIM Enduro World Championship	Enduro 1: (Spain) Josep García	2023 FIM Enduro World Championship
FIM Enduro World Championship	Enduro 2: (United Kingdom) Steve Holcombe	2023 FIM Enduro World Championship
FIM Enduro World Championship	Enduro 3: (United Kingdom) Brad Freeman	2023 FIM Enduro World Championship
FIM Enduro World Championship	Junior: (United Kingdom) Jed Etchells	2023 FIM Enduro World Championship
FIM Enduro World Championship	Junior 1: (United Kingdom) Jed Etchells	2023 FIM Enduro World Championship
FIM Enduro World Championship	Junior 2: (United Kingdom) Albin Norrbin	2023 FIM Enduro World Championship
FIM Enduro World Championship	Youth: (Italy) Kevin Cristino	2023 FIM Enduro World Championship
FIM Enduro World Championship	Women: (United Kingdom) Jane Daniels	2023 FIM Enduro World Championship
FIM Enduro World Championship	Open 2-Stroke: (Czech Republic) Jiri Hadek	2023 FIM Enduro World Championship
FIM Enduro World Championship	Open 4-Stroke: (France) Enzo Marchal	2023 FIM Enduro World Championship
FIM Supercross World Championship	(Germany) Ken Roczen	2023 FIM Supercross World Championship
FIM Supercross World Championship	SX2: (United Kingdom) Max Anstie	2023 FIM Supercross World Championship
AMA Supercross Championship	450 SX: (United States) Chase Sexton	2023 AMA Supercross Championship
AMA Supercross Championship	250 SX West: (Australia) Jett Lawrence	2023 AMA Supercross Championship
AMA Supercross Championship	250 SX East: (Australia) Hunter Lawrence	2023 AMA Supercross Championship
European Motocross Championship	EMX250: (Italy) Andrea Bonacorsi	2023 European Motocross Championship
European Motocross Championship	EMX250 Manufacturers: (Japan) Yamaha	2023 European Motocross Championship
European Motocross Championship	EMX125: (Latvia) Jānis Reišulis	2023 European Motocross Championship
European Motocross Championship	EMX125 Manufacturers: (Japan) Yamaha	2023 European Motocross Championship
European Motocross Championship	EMXOpen: (France) Pierre Goupillon	2023 European Motocross Championship
European Motocross Championship	EMXOpen Manufacturers: (Austria) KTM	2023 European Motocross Championship
European Motocross Championship	EMX2T: (Netherlands) Cas Valk	2023 European Motocross Championship
European Motocross Championship	EMX2T Manufacturers: (Italy) Fantic	2023 European Motocross Championship
European Motocross Championship	EMX85: (Italy) Nicolò Alvisi	2023 European Motocross Championship
European Motocross Championship	EMX85 Manufacturers: (Spain) Gas Gas	2023 European Motocross Championship
European Motocross Championship	EMX65: (Italy) Francesco Assini	2023 European Motocross Championship
European Motocross Championship	EMX65 Manufacturers: (Spain) Gas Gas	2023 European Motocross Championship

=== Track racing ===
Series	Champion	Refer
Super Star Championship	(Japan) Shuhei Aoyama	Super Star Championship 2023

== Open-wheel racing ==
Series	Champion	Refer
FIA Formula One World Championship	(Netherlands) Max Verstappen	2023 Formula One World Championship
FIA Formula One World Championship	Constructors: (Austria) Red Bull Racing-Honda RBPT	2023 Formula One World Championship
FIA Formula 2 Championship	(France) Théo Pourchaire	2023 Formula 2 Championship
FIA Formula 2 Championship	Teams: (France) ART Grand Prix	2023 Formula 2 Championship
FIA Formula E Championship	(United Kingdom) Jake Dennis	2022–23 Formula E World Championship
FIA Formula E Championship	Teams: (United Kingdom) Envision Racing	2022–23 Formula E World Championship
IndyCar Series	(Spain) Álex Palou	2023 IndyCar Series
IndyCar Series	Manufacturers: (United States) Chevrolet	2023 IndyCar Series
IndyCar Series	Rookies: (New Zealand) Marcus Armstrong	2023 IndyCar Series
Indy NXT	(Denmark) Christian Rasmussen	2023 Indy NXT
Indy NXT	Teams: (United States) HMD Motorsports with Dale Coyne Racing	2023 Indy NXT
Indy NXT	Rookies: (United States) Nolan Siegel	2023 Indy NXT
Atlantic Championship	(United States) Jimmy Simpson	2023 Atlantic Championship
Atlantic Championship	Open: (United States) Austin Hill	2023 Atlantic Championship
BOSS GP	F1: (Austria) Ingo Gerstl	2023 BOSS GP Series
BOSS GP	Open: (Brazil) Antônio Pizzonia	2023 BOSS GP Series
BOSS GP	Formula: (Italy) Simone Colombo	2023 BOSS GP Series
BOSS GP	Super Lights: (Germany) Henry Clausnitzer	2023 BOSS GP Series
Formula Beat	(Japan) Kota Sasaki	2023 Formula Beat
Formula Car Challenge	Formula Mazda: (United States) Christian Okpysh	2023 Formula Car Challenge
Formula Car Challenge	Formula Speed: (United States) Tao Takaoka	2023 Formula Car Challenge
Formula Car Challenge	Pro Formula Mazda: (United States) Joe Briggs	2023 Formula Car Challenge
Fórmula Nacional Argentina	(Argentina) Nicolás Suárez	2023 Fórmula Nacional Argentina
Fórmula Nacional Argentina	Teams: (Argentina) Gabriel Werner Competición	2023 Fórmula Nacional Argentina
Formula Nordic	(Sweden) Linus Granfors	2023 Formula Nordic
Formula Pro USA Western Championship	FPUSA-3: (Canada) Nicole Havrda	2023 Formula Pro USA Western Championship
Formula Pro USA Western Championship	FPUSA-4: (United States) Dmitry Pistolyako	2023 Formula Pro USA Western Championship
Formula Pro USA Winter Series	FPUSA-3: (Canada) Nicole Havrda	2023 Formula Pro USA Winter Series
Formula Pro USA Winter Series	FPUSA-4: (Australia) Daniel Quimby	2023 Formula Pro USA Winter Series
Formula Winter Series	(Poland) Kacper Sztuka	2023 Formula Winter Series
Formula Winter Series	Rookies: (Australia) Gianmarco Pradel	2023 Formula Winter Series
FIA Masters Historic Formula One Championship	Fittipaldi/Stewart: (United Kingdom) Nick Padmore	2023 FIA Masters Historic Formula One Championship
FIA Masters Historic Formula One Championship	Head/Lauda: (United States) Ken Tyrrell	2023 FIA Masters Historic Formula One Championship
Indian Racing League	(South Africa) Raoul Hyman (India) Sohil Shah (No. 24 Goa Aces)	2023 Indian Racing League
Indian Racing League	Teams: (India) Bangalore Speedsters	2023 Indian Racing League
MRF Formula 2000	(India) Sandeep Kumar	2023 MRF Formula 2000 season
S5000 Australian Drivers' Championship	(Australia) Aaron Cameron	2023 S5000 Australian Drivers' Championship
S5000 Australian Drivers' Championship	Tasman Series: (Australia) Aaron Cameron	2023 S5000 Australian Drivers' Championship
Super Formula Championship	(Japan) Ritomo Miyata	2023 Super Formula Championship
Super Formula Championship	Teams: (Japan) Team Mugen	2023 Super Formula Championship
TTE Formula Renault Cup	(France) Jonathan Correrella	2023 TTE Formula Renault Cup
TTE Formula Renault Cup	Rookies: (France) Jonathan Correrella	2023 TTE Formula Renault Cup
TTE Formula Renault Cup	Gentlemen's Cup: (France) Serge Coperchini	2023 TTE Formula Renault Cup
USF Pro 2000 Championship	(United States) Myles Rowe	2023 USF Pro 2000 Championship
USF Pro 2000 Championship	Teams: (United States) Pabst Racing	2023 USF Pro 2000 Championship
USF2000 Championship	(United States) Simon Sikes	2023 USF2000 Championship
USF2000 Championship	Teams: (United States) Pabst Racing	2023 USF2000 Championship
USF Juniors	(Brazil) Nicolas Giaffone	2023 USF Juniors
Formula Three
FIA Formula 3 Championship	(Brazil) Gabriel Bortoleto	2023 FIA Formula 3 Championship
FIA Formula 3 Championship	Teams: (Italy) Prema Racing	2023 FIA Formula 3 Championship
Formula Regional Americas Championship	(New Zealand) Callum Hedge	2023 Formula Regional Americas Championship
Formula Regional Americas Championship	Teams: (United States) Crosslink Kiwi Motorsports	2023 Formula Regional Americas Championship
Formula Regional European Championship	(Italy) Andrea Kimi Antonelli	2023 Formula Regional European Championship
Formula Regional European Championship	Teams: (Italy) Prema Racing	2023 Formula Regional European Championship
Formula Regional Japanese Championship	(Japan) Sota Ogawa	2023 Formula Regional Japanese Championship
Formula Regional Japanese Championship	Teams: (Japan) Sutekina Racing Team	2023 Formula Regional Japanese Championship
Formula Regional Japanese Championship	Masters: (Japan) Yoshitsugu Kondo	2023 Formula Regional Japanese Championship
Formula Regional Middle East Championship	(Italy) Andrea Kimi Antonelli	2023 Formula Regional Middle East Championship
Formula Regional Middle East Championship	Teams: (India) Mumbai Falcons Racing Limited	2023 Formula Regional Middle East Championship
Formula Regional Middle East Championship	Rookies: (Italy) Andrea Kimi Antonelli	2023 Formula Regional Middle East Championship
Formula Regional Oceania Championship	(Austria) Charlie Wurz	2023 Formula Regional Oceania Championship
Formula Regional Oceania Championship	Teams: (New Zealand) M2 Competition	2023 Formula Regional Oceania Championship
Australian Formula Open Series	(Australia) Trent Grubel	2023 Australian Formula Open Series
Australian Formula Open Series	ARO1: (Australia) Trent Grubel	2023 Australian Formula Open Series
Australian Formula Open Series	ARO3: (Australia) Matthew Roesler	2023 Australian Formula Open Series
Australian Formula Open Series	ARO4: (Australia) Brodie Norris	2023 Australian Formula Open Series
Drexler-Automotive Formula Cup	(Hungary) Benjamin Berta	2023 Drexler-Automotive Formula Cup
Drexler-Automotive Formula Cup	Trophy: (Switzerland) Marcel Tobler	2023 Drexler-Automotive Formula Cup
Drexler-Automotive Formula Cup	Formula Light: (Italy) Fabio Turchetto	2023 Drexler-Automotive Formula Cup
Eurocup-3	(France) Esteban Masson	2023 Eurocup-3 season
Eurocup-3	Teams: (Spain) Campos Racing	2023 Eurocup-3 season
Eurocup-3	Rookies: (Spain) Bruno del Pino	2023 Eurocup-3 season
Euroformula Open Championship	(Mexico) Noel León	2023 Euroformula Open Championship
Euroformula Open Championship	Teams: (Germany) Team Motopark	2023 Euroformula Open Championship
Euroformula Open Championship	Rookies: (Germany) Jakob Bergmeister	2023 Euroformula Open Championship
F2000 Italian Formula Trophy	(Japan) Juju Noda	2023 F2000 Italian Formula Trophy
F2000 Italian Formula Trophy	Teams: (Japan) Noda Racing	2023 F2000 Italian Formula Trophy
F2000 Italian Formula Trophy	F2.0 Cup: (Italy) Stefano Palummieri	2023 F2000 Italian Formula Trophy
F2000 Italian Formula Trophy	F2.0 Cup Teams: (Italy) Derva Corse ASD	2023 F2000 Italian Formula Trophy
GB3 Championship	(United Kingdom) Callum Voisin	2023 GB3 Championship
GB3 Championship	Teams: (United Kingdom) JHR Developments	2023 GB3 Championship
Super Formula Lights	(Japan) Iori Kimura	2023 Super Formula Lights
Super Formula Lights	Teams: (Japan) B-Max Racing	2023 Super Formula Lights
Super Formula Lights	Engine manufacturers: (Germany) Siegfried Spiess Motorenbau GmbH	2023 Super Formula Lights
Super Formula Lights	Masters: (Japan) Nobuhiro Imada	2023 Super Formula Lights
Ultimate Cup Series	F3R: (France) Paul Trojani	2023 Ultimate Cup Series
Ultimate Cup Series	F3R Ultimate: (Switzerland) Walter Rykart	2023 Ultimate Cup Series
Ultimate Cup Series	FR2.0: (France) Jordan Roupnel	2023 Ultimate Cup Series
Ultimate Cup Series	F4: (France) Philippe Daric	2023 Ultimate Cup Series
Formula 4
F1 Academy	(Spain) Marta García	2023 F1 Academy season
F1 Academy	Teams: (Italy) Prema Racing	2023 F1 Academy season
F4 Brazilian Championship	(Brazil) Vinícius Tessaro	2023 F4 Brazilian Championship
F4 Brazilian Championship	Teams: (Brazil) Cavaleiro Sports	2023 F4 Brazilian Championship
F4 Brazilian Championship	Rookies: (Brazil) Matheus Comparatto	2023 F4 Brazilian Championship
F4 British Championship	(New Zealand) Louis Sharp	2023 F4 British Championship
F4 British Championship	Teams: (United Kingdom) Rodin Carlin	2023 F4 British Championship
F4 British Championship	Rookie: (Sweden) Gustav Jonsson	2023 F4 British Championship
Formula 4 CEZ Championship	(Switzerland) Ethan Ischer	2023 Formula 4 CEZ Championship
Formula 4 CEZ Championship	Teams: (Switzerland) Jenzer Motorsport	2023 Formula 4 CEZ Championship
F4 Chinese Championship	(Macau) Tiago Rodrigues	2023 F4 Chinese Championship
F4 Chinese Championship	Teams: (China) Smart Life Racing Team	2023 F4 Chinese Championship
F4 Chinese Championship	Masters: (China) Lü Sixiang	2023 F4 Chinese Championship
F4 Danish Championship	(Denmark) Mikkel Gaarde Pedersen	2023 F4 Danish Championship
F4 Danish Championship	Rookies: (Denmark) Mikkel Gaarde Pedersen	2023 F4 Danish Championship
F4 Danish Championship	Formula 5: (Denmark) Mads Hoe	2023 F4 Danish Championship
French F4 Championship	(France) Evan Giltaire	2023 French F4 Championship
F4 Indian Championship	(Australia) Cooper Webster	2023 F4 Indian Championship
Italian F4 Championship	(Poland) Kacper Sztuka	2023 Italian F4 Championship
Italian F4 Championship	Teams: (Italy) Prema Racing	2023 Italian F4 Championship
Italian F4 Championship	Rookies: (United Kingdom) Arvid Lindblad	2023 Italian F4 Championship
Italian F4 Championship	Women's: (Switzerland) Tina Hausmann	2023 Italian F4 Championship
F4 Japanese Championship	(Japan) Rikuto Kobayashi	2023 F4 Japanese Championship
F4 Japanese Championship	Teams: (Japan) TGR-DC Racing School	2023 F4 Japanese Championship
F4 Japanese Championship	Independent Cup: (Japan) Makoto Fujiwara	2023 F4 Japanese Championship
NACAM Formula 4 Championship	(Colombia) Pedro Juan Moreno	2023 NACAM Formula 4 Championship
Formula 4 South East Asia Championship	(Australia) Jack Beeton	2023 Formula 4 South East Asia Championship
Formula 4 South East Asia Championship	Teams: (China) Asia Racing Team	2023 Formula 4 South East Asia Championship
Formula 4 South East Asia Championship	Rookies: (France) Doriane Pin	2023 Formula 4 South East Asia Championship
F4 Spanish Championship	(Spain) Théophile Naël	2023 F4 Spanish Championship
F4 Spanish Championship	Teams: (Spain) Campos Racing Drivers Development	2023 F4 Spanish Championship
Formula 4 UAE Championship	(Australia) James Wharton	2023 Formula 4 UAE Championship
Formula 4 UAE Championship	Teams: (India) Mumbai Falcons Racing Limited	2023 Formula 4 UAE Championship
Formula 4 UAE Championship	Rookies: (Finland) Tuukka Taponen	2023 Formula 4 UAE Championship
Formula 4 United States Championship	(Canada) Patrick Woods-Toth	2023 Formula 4 United States Championship
Formula 4 United States Championship	Teams: (United States) Crosslink/Kiwi Motorsport	2023 Formula 4 United States Championship
Euro 4 Championship	(United States) Ugo Ugochukwu	2023 Euro 4 Championship
Euro 4 Championship	Teams: (Italy) Prema Powerteam	2023 Euro 4 Championship
GB4 Championship	(United Kingdom) Tom Mills	2023 GB4 Championship
GB4 Championship	Teams: (United Kingdom) KMR Sport	2023 GB4 Championship
Formula Ford
Australian Formula Ford Championship	(Australia) Matthew Hillyer	2023 Australian Formula Ford Championship
F1600 Championship Series	(United States) Porter Aiken	2023 F1600 Championship Series
F2000 Championship Series	(United States) JT Novosielski	2023 F2000 Championship Series
New Zealand Formula Ford Championship	(New Zealand) Alex Crosbie	2022–23 New Zealand Formula Ford Championship
Pacific F2000	(United States) Troy Shooter	2023 Pacific F2000 Championship
Toyo Tires F1600 Championship Series	(Canada) Logan Pacza	2023 Toyo Tires F1600 Championship Series
Other junior formulae
Chilean Formula Three Championship	(Chile) Tomás Álvarez	2023 Chilean Formula Three Championship

== Rally ==
Series	Champion	Refer
FIA World Rally Championship	(Finland) Kalle Rovanperä	2023 World Rally Championship
FIA World Rally Championship	Co-Drivers: (Finland) Jonne Halttunen	2023 World Rally Championship
FIA World Rally Championship	Manufacturers: (Japan) Toyota Gazoo Racing WRT	2023 World Rally Championship
FIA World Rally Championship-2	(Norway) Andreas Mikkelsen	2023 World Rally Championship-2
FIA World Rally Championship-2	Co-Drivers: (Norway) Torstein Eriksen	2023 World Rally Championship-2
FIA World Rally Championship-2	Teams: (Germany) Toksport WRT 2	2023 World Rally Championship-2
FIA World Rally Championship-2	Challenger: (Poland) Kajetan Kajetanowicz	2023 World Rally Championship-2
FIA World Rally Championship-2	Challenger Co-Drivers: (Poland) Maciej Szczepaniak	2023 World Rally Championship-2
FIA World Rally Championship-3	(Finland) Roope Korhonen	2023 World Rally Championship-3
FIA World Rally Championship-3	Co-Drivers: (Finland) Anssi Viinikka	2023 World Rally Championship-3
FIA Junior World Rally Championship	(Republic of Ireland) William Creighton	2023 Junior World Rally Championship
FIA Junior World Rally Championship	Co-Drivers: (Republic of Ireland) Liam Regan	2023 Junior World Rally Championship
African Rally Championship	(Kenya) Karan Patel	2023 African Rally Championship
African Rally Championship	Co-Drivers: (Kenya) Tauseef Khan	2023 African Rally Championship
Asia-Pacific Rally Championship	(Indonesia) Rifat Sungkar	2023 Asia-Pacific Rally Championship
Asia-Pacific Rally Championship	Co-Drivers: (Australia) Ben Searcy	2023 Asia-Pacific Rally Championship
Australian Rally Championship	(Australia) Harry Bates	2023 Australian Rally Championship
Australian Rally Championship	Co-Drivers: (Australia) Coral Taylor	2023 Australian Rally Championship
British Rally Championship	(France) Adrien Fourmaux	2023 British Rally Championship
British Rally Championship	Co-Drivers: (France) Alexandre Coria	2023 British Rally Championship
Canadian Rally Championship	(Canada) Jean-Sébastien Besner	2023 Canadian Rally Championship
Canadian Rally Championship	Co-Drivers: (Canada) Yvan Joyal	2023 Canadian Rally Championship
Codasur South American Rally Championship	(Paraguay) Fabrizio Zaldivar	
Czech Rally Championship	(Czech Republic) Jan Kopecký	2023 Czech Rally Championship
Czech Rally Championship	Co-Drivers: (Czech Republic) Jan Hloušek	2023 Czech Rally Championship
Deutsche Rallye Meisterschaft	(Germany) Marijan Griebel	
Estonian Rally Championship	(Estonia) Timmu Kõrge	2023 Estonian Rally Championship
Estonian Rally Championship	Co-Drivers: (Estonia) Arro Vahtra	2023 Estonian Rally Championship
European Rally Championship	(New Zealand) Hayden Paddon	2023 European Rally Championship
European Rally Championship	Co-Drivers: (New Zealand) John Kennard	2023 European Rally Championship
European Rally Championship	Teams: (India) Team MRF Tyres	2023 European Rally Championship
European Rally Championship	ERC3: (United Kingdom) Jon Armstrong	2023 European Rally Championship
European Rally Championship	ERC4: (Italy) Roberto Daprà	2023 European Rally Championship
European Rally Championship	ERC Junior: (Romania) Norbert Maior	2023 European Rally Championship
French Rally Championship	(France) Yoann Bonato	
Hungarian Rally Championship	(Hungary) Ferenc Vincze	
Hungarian Rally Championship	Co-Drivers: (Hungary) Nándor Percze	
Indian National Rally Championship	(India) Aroor Arjun Rao	
Indian National Rally Championship	Co-Drivers: (India) Satish Rajagopal	
Italian Rally Championship	(Italy) Andrea Crugnola	
Italian Rally Championship	Co-Drivers: (Italy) Pietro Elia Ometto	
Italian Rally Championship	Manufacturers: (Czech Republic) Škoda	
Middle East Rally Championship	(Qatar) Nasser Al-Attiyah (Oman) Abdullah Al-Rawah	
NACAM Rally Championship	(Mexico) Ricardo Cordero Jr.	
New Zealand Rally Championship	(New Zealand) Hayden Paddon	2023 New Zealand Rally Championship
New Zealand Rally Championship	Co-Drivers: (New Zealand) John Kennard	2023 New Zealand Rally Championship
Portuguese Rally Championship	(Portugal) Ricardo Teodósio	2023 Portuguese Rally Championship
Portuguese Rally Championship	Co-Drivers: (Portugal) José Teixeira	2023 Portuguese Rally Championship
Portuguese Rally Championship	Teams: (Portugal) Sports & You	2023 Portuguese Rally Championship
Polish Rally Championship	(Poland) Grzegorz Grzyb	
Romanian Rally Championship	(Romania) Simone Tempestini	
Scottish Rally Championship	(United Kingdom) David Henderson	2023 Scottish Rally Championship
Scottish Rally Championship	Co-Drivers: (United Kingdom) Chris Lees	2023 Scottish Rally Championship
Slovak Rally Championship	(Slovakia) Jaroslav Melichárek	
Slovak Rally Championship	Co-Drivers: (Slovakia) Erik Melichárek	
South African National Rally Championship	(South Africa) Johannes Potgieter	
South African National Rally Championship	Co-Drivers: (South Africa) Tommy Du Toit	
Spanish Rally Championship	(Spain) Álvaro Muñíz	
Spanish Rally Championship	Co-Drivers: (Spain) Néstor Casal	

=== Rally raid ===
Series	Champion	Refer
Extreme E	(Sweden) Johan Kristoffersson (Sweden) Mikaela Åhlin-Kottulinsky	2023 Extreme E Championship
Extreme E	Teams: (Germany) Rosberg X Racing	2023 Extreme E Championship
FIA World Rally-Raid Championship	(Qatar) Nasser Al-Attiyah	2023 World Rally-Raid Championship
FIA World Rally-Raid Championship	Co-Drivers: (France) Mathieu Baumel	2023 World Rally-Raid Championship
FIA World Rally-Raid Championship	Manufacturers: (Japan) Toyota Gazoo Racing	2023 World Rally-Raid Championship
FIA World Rally-Raid Championship	T3: (United States) Seth Quintero	2023 World Rally-Raid Championship
FIA World Rally-Raid Championship	T3 Co-Drivers: (Germany) Dennis Zenz	2023 World Rally-Raid Championship
FIA World Rally-Raid Championship	T4: (Lithuania) Rokas Baciuška	2023 World Rally-Raid Championship
FIA World Rally-Raid Championship	T4 Co-Drivers: (Spain) Oriol Vidal	2023 World Rally-Raid Championship
FIA World Rally-Raid Championship	T5: (Netherlands) Janus van Kasteren	2023 World Rally-Raid Championship
FIA World Rally-Raid Championship	T5 Co-Drivers: (Poland) Darek Rodewald; T5 Co-Drivers: (Netherlands) Marcel Snijders	2023 World Rally-Raid Championship
FIM World Rally-Raid Championship	(Argentina) Luciano Benavides	2023 World Rally-Raid Championship
FIM World Rally-Raid Championship	Manufacturers: (Japan) Monster Energy Honda Team	2023 World Rally-Raid Championship
FIM World Rally-Raid Championship	Rally2: (France) Romain Dumontier	2023 World Rally-Raid Championship
FIM World Rally-Raid Championship	Rally2 Junior: (France) Jean-Loup Lepan	2023 World Rally-Raid Championship
FIM World Rally-Raid Championship	Rally3: (Austria) Ardit Kurtaj	2023 World Rally-Raid Championship
FIM World Rally-Raid Championship	Quad: (Lithuania) Laisvydas Kancius	2023 World Rally-Raid Championship
FIM World Rally-Raid Championship	Women: (Netherlands) Mirjam Pol	2023 World Rally-Raid Championship
FIM World Rally-Raid Championship	Veterans: (Spain) Dominique Cizeau Girault	2023 World Rally-Raid Championship
FIM Bajas World Cup	(United Arab Emirates) Mohammed Al-Balooshi	2023 FIM Bajas World Cup
FIM Bajas World Cup	Quads: (France) Kevin Giroud	2023 FIM Bajas World Cup
FIM Bajas World Cup	Women: (Spain) Esther Merino García	2023 FIM Bajas World Cup
FIM Bajas World Cup	Junior: (Canada) Jonathan Finn	2023 FIM Bajas World Cup
FIM Bajas World Cup	Veteran: (Portugal) Pedro Bianchi Prata	2023 FIM Bajas World Cup
FIM Bajas World Cup	Manufacturers: (Austria) KTM	2023 FIM Bajas World Cup
FIA World Cup for Cross-Country Bajas	(Qatar) Nasser Al-Attiyah	2023 FIA World Cup for Cross-Country Bajas
FIA World Cup for Cross-Country Bajas	Co-Drivers: (Andorra) Mathieu Baumel	2023 FIA World Cup for Cross-Country Bajas
FIA World Cup for Cross-Country Bajas	Teams: (Belgium) Overdrive Racing	2023 FIA World Cup for Cross-Country Bajas
FIA World Cup for Cross-Country Bajas	T3: (Brazil) Otavio Sousa Leite	2023 FIA World Cup for Cross-Country Bajas
FIA World Cup for Cross-Country Bajas	T4: (Brazil) Cristiano De Sousa Batista	2023 FIA World Cup for Cross-Country Bajas
FIA World Cup for Cross-Country Bajas	T4 Teams: (Germany) South Racing Can-Am	2023 FIA World Cup for Cross-Country Bajas

=== Rallycross ===
Series	Champion	Refer
FIA World Rallycross Championship	(Sweden) Johan Kristoffersson	2023 FIA World Rallycross Championship
FIA World Rallycross Championship	Teams: (Sweden) Volkswagen Dealerteam BAUHAUS	2023 FIA World Rallycross Championship
FIA World Rallycross Championship	RX2e: (Sweden) Nils Andersson	2023 FIA World Rallycross Championship
FIA European Rallycross Championship	(Sweden) Anton Marklund	2023 FIA European Rallycross Championship
FIA European Rallycross Championship	RX3: (Poland) Damian Litwinowicz	2023 FIA European Rallycross Championship

== Sports car and GT ==
Series	Champion	Refer
FIA World Endurance Championship	Hypercar: (Switzerland) Sébastien Buemi; Hypercar: (New Zealand) Brendon Hartley; Hypercar: (Japan) Ryō Hirakawa	2023 FIA World Endurance Championship
FIA World Endurance Championship	Hypercar Manufacturers: (Japan) Toyota	2023 FIA World Endurance Championship
FIA World Endurance Championship	Hypercar Teams: (United Kingdom) Hertz Team Jota	2023 FIA World Endurance Championship
FIA World Endurance Championship	LMP2: (Angola) Rui Andrade; LMP2: (Switzerland) Louis Delétraz; LMP2: (Poland) Robert Kubica	2023 FIA World Endurance Championship
FIA World Endurance Championship	LMP2 Teams: (Belgium) Team WRT	2023 FIA World Endurance Championship
FIA World Endurance Championship	GTE Am: (Netherlands) Nicky Catsburg; GTE Am: (United States) Ben Keating; GTE Am: (Argentina) Nicolás Varrone	2023 FIA World Endurance Championship
FIA World Endurance Championship	GTE Teams: (United States) Corvette Racing	2023 FIA World Endurance Championship
24H GT Series	Overall Teams: (South Korea) No. 403 Atlas BX Motorsports	2023 24H GT Series
24H GT Series	GT3: (Belgium) Mathieu Detry	2023 24H GT Series
24H GT Series	GT3 Teams: (Antigua and Barbuda) No. 21 HAAS RT	2023 24H GT Series
24H GT Series	GT3 Pro-Am: (Germany) Elia Erhart; GT3 Pro-Am: (Germany) Pierre Kaffer	2023 24H GT Series
24H GT Series	GT3 Pro-Am Teams: (Germany) No. 1 Scherer Sport PHX	2023 24H GT Series
24H GT Series	GT3 Am: (United States) Charles Espenlaub; GT3 Am: (United States) Shane Lewis; GT3 Am: (United States) Charles Putman	2023 24H GT Series
24H GT Series	GT3 Am Teams: (United States) No. 85 CP Racing	2023 24H GT Series
24H GT Series	GT4: (Netherlands) Roelof Bruins; GT4: (Canada) Steven Cho; GT4: (South Korea) Kim Jong-kyum	2023 24H GT Series
24H GT Series	GT4 Teams: (South Korea) No. 403 Atlas BX Motorsports	2023 24H GT Series
24H GT Series	GTX: (Lithuania) Audrius Butkevicius; GTX: (Italy) Nicola Michelon; GTX: (Lithuania) Paulius Paskevicius	2023 24H GT Series
24H GT Series	GTX Teams: (Lithuania) No. 720 RD Signs – Siauliai Racing Team	2023 24H GT Series
24H GT Series	992: (Italy) Sabino de Castro; 992: (Romania) Sergiu Nicolae	2023 24H GT Series
24H GT Series	992 Teams: (Romania) No. 955 Willi Motorsport by Ebimotors	2023 24H GT Series
24H GT Series	992 Am: (Germany) Philip Hamprecht; 992 Am: (Sweden) Niclas Jönsson; 992 Am: (United States) Tracy Krohn	2023 24H GT Series
24H GT Series	992 Am Teams: (Germany) No. 907 RPM Racing	2023 24H GT Series
ADAC GT Masters	(Germany) Salman Owega (Finland) Elias Seppänen	2023 ADAC GT Masters
ADAC GT Masters	Teams: (Germany) Haupt Racing Team	2023 ADAC GT Masters
ADAC GT Masters	Junior: (Germany) Salman Owega; Junior: (Finland) Elias Seppänen	2023 ADAC GT Masters
ADAC GT4 Germany	(Germany) Hugo Sasse (Germany) Mike David Ortmann	2023 ADAC GT4 Germany
ADAC GT4 Germany	Teams: (Germany) W&S Motorsport	2023 ADAC GT4 Germany
ADAC GT4 Germany	Junior: (Germany) Simon Connor Primm	2023 ADAC GT4 Germany
ADAC GT4 Germany	Trophy: Marat Khayrov	2023 ADAC GT4 Germany
Asian Le Mans Series	LMP2: (Republic of Ireland) Charlie Eastwood; LMP2: (Turkey) Ayhancan Güven; LMP2: (Turkey) Salih Yoluç	2023 Asian Le Mans Series
Asian Le Mans Series	LMP2 Teams: (Luxembourg) #3 DKR Engineering	2023 Asian Le Mans Series
Asian Le Mans Series	LMP3: (France) François Heriau; LMP3: (Spain) Xavier Lloveras; LMP3: (France) Fabrice Rossello	2023 Asian Le Mans Series
Asian Le Mans Series	LMP3 Teams: (France) #8 Graff Racing	2023 Asian Le Mans Series
Asian Le Mans Series	GT: (Netherlands) Nicky Catsburg; GT: (United States) Chandler Hull; GT: (United States) Thomas Merrill	2023 Asian Le Mans Series
Asian Le Mans Series	GT Teams: (Germany) #34 Walkenhorst Motorsport	2023 Asian Le Mans Series
Australian National Trans Am Series	(Australia) James Moffat	2023 Australian National Trans Am Series
British Endurance Championship	(Philippines) Daryl DeLeon (United Kingdom) Adam Hatfield (United Kingdom) Bradley Thurston (United Kingdom) Alex Sedgwick	2023 British Endurance Championship
British Endurance Championship	Class A: (United Kingdom) Andrew Bentley; Class A: (United Kingdom) Marcus Clutton; Class A: (New Zealand) Peter Erceg	2023 British Endurance Championship
British Endurance Championship	Class B: (United Kingdom) John Seale; Class B: (United Kingdom) Jamie Stanley	2023 British Endurance Championship
British Endurance Championship	Class C: (Philippines) Daryl DeLeon; Class C: (United Kingdom) Adam Hatfield; Class C: (United Kingdom) Bradley Thurston; Class C: (United Kingdom) Alex Sedgwick	2023 British Endurance Championship
British Endurance Championship	GT4: (United Kingdom) Matt George; GT4: (United Kingdom) Chris Jones; GT4: (United Kingdom) Neville Jones	2023 British Endurance Championship
British Endurance Championship	TCR: (United Kingdom) Johnathan Beeson; TCR: (United Kingdom) George Heler	2023 British Endurance Championship
British Endurance Championship	Class G: (United Kingdom) Marc Elman; Class G: (United Kingdom) Owen Hizzey; Class G: (United Kingdom) Scott Symons	2023 British Endurance Championship
British Endurance Championship	Class F: (United Kingdom) Adam Thompson; Class F: (United Kingdom) Callum Thompson	2023 British Endurance Championship
British GT Championship	GT3: (United Kingdom) Darren Leung; GT3: (United Kingdom) Dan Harper	2023 British GT Championship
British GT Championship	GT3 Teams: (Bahrain) 2 Seas Motorsport	2023 British GT Championship
British GT Championship	GT3 Pro-Am: (United Kingdom) Darren Leung; GT3 Pro-Am: (United Kingdom) Dan Harper	2023 British GT Championship
British GT Championship	GT3 Silver-Am: (United Kingdom) Mark Sansom; GT3 Silver-Am: (United Kingdom) Will Tregurtha	2023 British GT Championship
British GT Championship	GT4: (United States) Erik Evans; GT4: (United Kingdom) Matt Cowley	2023 British GT Championship
British GT Championship	GT4 Teams: (United Kingdom) Century Motorsport	2023 British GT Championship
British GT Championship	GT4 Pro-Am: (United Kingdom) Michael Johnston; GT4 Pro-Am: (United Kingdom) Chris Salkeld	2023 British GT Championship
British GT Championship	GT4 Am: (United Kingdom) Ian Duggan; GT4 Am: (United Kingdom) James Townsend	2023 British GT Championship
British GT Championship	GT4 Silver: (United Kingdom) Jack Brown; GT4 Silver: (United Kingdom) Charles Clark	2023 British GT Championship
China Endurance Championship	GT3 Pro-Am: (China) Cheng Congfu; GT3 Pro-Am: (China) Li Sushang	2023 China Endurance Championship
China Endurance Championship	GT3 Am: (China) Liu Hangcheng	2023 China Endurance Championship
China Endurance Championship	GT3 Teams: (China) Phantom Pro Racing Team	2023 China Endurance Championship
China Endurance Championship	GT4 Am: (China) Han Lichao; GT4 Am: (China) Wang Hao	2023 China Endurance Championship
China Endurance Championship	GT4 Teams: TGR China Team Phantom Pro	2023 China Endurance Championship
China Endurance Championship	TCE: (China) Lai Jingwen; TCE: (China) Zhao Di; TCE: (China) Zhu Shengdong	2023 China Endurance Championship
China Endurance Championship	TCE Teams: (China) 326 Racing Team	2023 China Endurance Championship
China Endurance Championship	Manufacturers' Cup A: (China) Song Baihua	2023 China Endurance Championship
China Endurance Championship	Manufacturers' Cup B: (China) Wang Tao	2023 China Endurance Championship
China Endurance Championship	TC2000: (China) Yang Yang; TC2000: (China) Zhang Hanxu; TC2000: (China) Zhao Lin	2023 China Endurance Championship
China Endurance Championship	TC1600A: (China) Huang Ying; TC1600A: (China) Xiong Jiabao; TC1600A: (China) Yang Haoyu	2023 China Endurance Championship
China Endurance Championship	TC1600B: (China) Ji Hao; TC1600B: (China) Su Li	2023 China Endurance Championship
Deutsche Tourenwagen Masters	(Austria) Thomas Preining	2023 Deutsche Tourenwagen Masters
Deutsche Tourenwagen Masters	Teams: (Germany) Manthey EMA	2023 Deutsche Tourenwagen Masters
Deutsche Tourenwagen Masters	Manufacturers: (Germany) Porsche	2023 Deutsche Tourenwagen Masters
European Le Mans Series	LMP2: (Australia) James Allen; LMP2: (United Kingdom) Alex Lynn; LMP2: (Barbados) Kyffin Simpson	2023 European Le Mans Series
European Le Mans Series	LMP2 Teams: (Portugal) #25 Algarve Pro Racing	2023 European Le Mans Series
European Le Mans Series	LMP2 Pro-Am: (France) François Perrodo; LMP2 Pro-Am: (France) Matthieu Vaxivière	2023 European Le Mans Series
European Le Mans Series	LMP2 Pro-Am Teams: (Italy) #83 AF Corse	2023 European Le Mans Series
European Le Mans Series	LMP3: (France) Adrien Chila; LMP3: (Argentina) Marcos Siebert; LMP3: (Mexico) Alex García	2023 European Le Mans Series
European Le Mans Series	LMP3 Teams: (Switzerland) #17 Cool Racing	2023 European Le Mans Series
European Le Mans Series	LMGTE: (United States) Ryan Hardwick; LMGTE: (Belgium) Alessio Picariello; LMGTE: (Canada) Zacharie Robichon	2023 European Le Mans Series
European Le Mans Series	LMGTE Teams: (Germany) #16 Proton Competition	2023 European Le Mans Series
GT America Series	SRO3: (Mexico) Memo Gidley	2023 GT America Series
GT America Series	SRO3 Teams: (United States) TKO Motorsports with Flying Lizard	2023 GT America Series
GT America Series	GT2: (United States) CJ Moses	2023 GT America Series
GT America Series	GT2 Teams: (United States) GMG Racing	2023 GT America Series
GT America Series	GT4: (United States) Jason Bell	2023 GT America Series
GT America Series	GT4 Teams: (United States) Flying Lizard Motorsports	2023 GT America Series
GT Cup Championship	(United Kingdom) Paul Bailey (United Kingdom) James Dorlin (United Kingdom) Ross Wylie	2023 GT Cup Championship
GT Cup Championship	Group GTO: (United Kingdom) Paul Bailey; Group GTO: (United Kingdom) James Dorlin; Group GTO: (United Kingdom) Ross Wylie	2023 GT Cup Championship
GT Cup Championship	Group GT3: (United Kingdom) Hugo Cook; Group GT3: (United Kingdom) Sacha Kakad	2023 GT Cup Championship
GT Cup Championship	Group GTC: (United Kingdom) Charlotte Gilbert; Group GTC: (United Kingdom) Warren Gilbert; Group GTC: (United Kingdom) Sam Neary; Group GTC: (United Kingdom) Morgan Short; Group GTC: (United Kingdom) Gilbert Yates	2023 GT Cup Championship
GT Cup Championship	Group GTH: (United Kingdom) Chris Hart; Group GTH: (United Kingdom) Stephen Walton	2023 GT Cup Championship
GT Cup Championship	Teams: (United Kingdom) Orange Racing powered by JMH	2023 GT Cup Championship
GT Cup Championship	Sprint Challenge: (United Kingdom) Paul Bailey	2023 GT Cup Championship
GT Cup Championship	Sporting Challenge: (Republic of Ireland) Chris Murphy	2023 GT Cup Championship
GT Cup Open Europe	(Spain) Jorge Cabezas (Spain) Iván Velasco	2023 GT Cup Open Europe
GT Cup Open Europe	Teams: (Belgium) Q1-trackracing	2023 GT Cup Open Europe
GT Cup Open Europe	Am: (Belgium) Xander Przybylak; Am: (Belgium) Laurent Vandervelde	2023 GT Cup Open Europe
GT Cup Open Europe	Trophy: (France) Julien Darras; Trophy: (France) Jayan Fazal-Karim	2023 GT Cup Open Europe
GT World Challenge America	Pro: (United States) Eric Filgueiras; Pro: (United Kingdom) Stevan McAleer	2023 GT World Challenge America
GT World Challenge America	Pro Teams: (United States) RennSport1 - CBW Racing	2023 GT World Challenge America
GT World Challenge America	Pro-Am: (United States) Colin Braun; Pro-Am: (United States) George Kurtz	2023 GT World Challenge America
GT World Challenge America	Pro-Am Teams: (United States) CrowdStrike Racing by Riley Motorsports	2023 GT World Challenge America
GT World Challenge America	Am: (United States) Anthony Bartone; Am: (United Kingdom) Andy Pilgrim	2023 GT World Challenge America
GT World Challenge America	Am Teams: (United States) Bartone Bros Racing with RealTime	2023 GT World Challenge America
GT World Challenge Asia	GT3: (China) Anthony Xu Liu	2023 GT World Challenge Asia
GT World Challenge Asia	GT3 Teams: (China) R&B Racing	2023 GT World Challenge Asia
GT World Challenge Asia	GT4: (Japan) Masaki Kano; GT4: (Japan) Manabu Orido	2023 GT World Challenge Asia
GT World Challenge Asia	GT4 Teams: (Japan) YZ Racing with Studie	2023 GT World Challenge Asia
GT World Challenge Asia	GT3 Silver Cup: (China) Ling Kang; GT3 Silver Cup: (China) Cao Qi	2023 GT World Challenge Asia
GT World Challenge Asia	GT3 Pro-Am: (China) Anthony Xu Liu	2023 GT World Challenge Asia
GT World Challenge Asia	GT4 Silver-Am: (Japan) Masaki Kano; GT4 Silver-Am Cup: (Japan) Manabu Orido	2023 GT World Challenge Asia
GT World Challenge Asia	GT3 Am: (China) Bian Ye; GT3 Am Cup: (China) Hu Yuqi	2023 GT World Challenge Asia
GT World Challenge Asia	GT4 Am: (Japan) Sho Kobayashi; GT4 Am Cup: (Japan) Naohiko Otsuka	2023 GT World Challenge Asia
GT World Challenge Australia	GT3 Pro-Am: (Australia) Liam Talbot	2023 GT World Challenge Australia
GT World Challenge Australia	GT3 Am: (Australia) Brad Schumacher	2023 GT World Challenge Australia
GT World Challenge Australia	GT Trophy: (Australia) Renee Gracie	2023 GT World Challenge Australia
GT World Challenge Australia	GT4: (Australia) Mark Griffiths	2023 GT World Challenge Australia
GT World Challenge Europe	Timur Boguslavskiy (Switzerland) Raffaele Marciello	2023 GT World Challenge Europe
GT World Challenge Europe	Teams: (France) AKKodis ASP Team	2023 GT World Challenge Europe
GT World Challenge Europe	Pro-Am: (Switzerland) Alex Fontana; Pro-Am: (Switzerland) Ivan Jacoma; Pro-Am: (Switzerland) Nicolas Leutwiler	2023 GT World Challenge Europe
GT World Challenge Europe	Pro-Am Teams: (Germany) Car Collection Motorsport	2023 GT World Challenge Europe
GT World Challenge Europe	Gold Cup: (Germany) Niklas Krütten; Gold Cup: (Australia) Calan Williams	2023 GT World Challenge Europe
GT World Challenge Europe	Gold Cup Teams: (Belgium) Boutsen VDS	2023 GT World Challenge Europe
GT World Challenge Europe	Silver Cup: (Germany) Alex Aka; Silver Cup: (Italy) Lorenzo Patrese	2023 GT World Challenge Europe
GT World Challenge Europe	Silver Cup Teams: (Germany) Tresor Atttempto Racing	2023 GT World Challenge Europe
GT World Challenge Europe	Bronze Cup: (United Kingdom) Alex Malykhin	2023 GT World Challenge Europe
GT World Challenge Europe	Bronze Cup Teams: (Lithuania) Pure Rxcing	2023 GT World Challenge Europe
GT World Challenge Europe Endurance Cup	Timur Boguslavskiy (Andorra) Jules Gounon (Switzerland) Raffaele Marciello	2023 GT World Challenge Europe Endurance Cup
GT World Challenge Europe Endurance Cup	Teams: (France) AKKodis ASP Team	2023 GT World Challenge Europe Endurance Cup
GT World Challenge Europe Endurance Cup	Pro-Am: (Switzerland) Alex Fontana; Pro-Am: (Switzerland) Ivan Jacoma; Pro-Am: (Switzerland) Nicolas Leutwiler	2023 GT World Challenge Europe Endurance Cup
GT World Challenge Europe Endurance Cup	Pro-Am Teams: (Germany) Car Collection Motorsport	2023 GT World Challenge Europe Endurance Cup
GT World Challenge Europe Endurance Cup	Gold Cup: (Belgium) Nicolas Baert; Gold Cup: (Belgium) Maxime Soulet	2023 GT World Challenge Europe Endurance Cup
GT World Challenge Europe Endurance Cup	Gold Cup Teams: (Belgium) Comtoyou Racing	2023 GT World Challenge Europe Endurance Cup
GT World Challenge Europe Endurance Cup	Silver Cup: (Netherlands) Glenn van Berlo; Silver Cup: (Austria) Clemens Schmid; Silver Cup: (Chile) Benjamín Hites	2023 GT World Challenge Europe Endurance Cup
GT World Challenge Europe Endurance Cup	Silver Cup Teams: (Austria) GRT Grasser Racing Team	2023 GT World Challenge Europe Endurance Cup
GT World Challenge Europe Endurance Cup	Bronze Cup: (Italy) Eddie Cheever III; Bronze Cup: (United Kingdom) Chris Froggatt; Bronze Cup: (Hong Kong) Jonathan Hui	2023 GT World Challenge Europe Endurance Cup
GT World Challenge Europe Endurance Cup	Bronze Cup Teams: (United Kingdom) Sky – Tempesta Racing	2023 GT World Challenge Europe Endurance Cup
GT World Challenge Europe Sprint Cup	(San Marino) Mattia Drudi (Switzerland) Ricardo Feller	2023 GT World Challenge Europe Sprint Cup
GT World Challenge Europe Sprint Cup	Teams: (Germany) Tresor Orange1	2023 GT World Challenge Europe Sprint Cup
GT World Challenge Europe Sprint Cup	Gold Cup: (Germany) Niklas Krütten; Gold Cup: (Australia) Calan Williams	2023 GT World Challenge Europe Sprint Cup
GT World Challenge Europe Sprint Cup	Gold Cup Teams: (Belgium) Boutsen VDS	2023 GT World Challenge Europe Sprint Cup
GT World Challenge Europe Sprint Cup	Silver Cup: (Australia) Jordan Love	2023 GT World Challenge Europe Sprint Cup
GT World Challenge Europe Sprint Cup	Silver Cup Teams: (Germany) Haupt Racing Team	2023 GT World Challenge Europe Sprint Cup
GT World Challenge Europe Sprint Cup	Bronze Cup: (United Kingdom) Alex Malykhin	2023 GT World Challenge Europe Sprint Cup
GT World Challenge Europe Sprint Cup	Bronze Cup Teams: (Lithuania) Pure Rxcing	2023 GT World Challenge Europe Sprint Cup
GT2 European Series	Pro-Am: (France) Henry Hassid; Pro-Am: (France) Anthony Beltoise	2023 GT2 European Series
GT2 European Series	Am: (Czech Republic) Jan Krabec	2023 GT2 European Series
GT4 America Series	Silver: (United States) Zac Anderson	2023 GT4 America Series
GT4 America Series	Silver Teams: (United States) Auto Technic Racing	2023 GT4 America Series
GT4 America Series	Pro-Am: (United States) Jason Hart; Pro-Am: (United States) Matt Travis	2023 GT4 America Series
GT4 America Series	Pro-Am Teams: (United States) Flying Lizard Motorsports	2023 GT4 America Series
GT4 America Series	Am: (United Kingdom) Charlie Postins; Am: (United States) James Clay	2023 GT4 America Series
GT4 America Series	Am Teams: (United States) Bimmerworld Racing	2023 GT4 America Series
GT4 European Series	Silver: (Germany) Michael Schrey; Silver: (Italy) Gabriele Piana	2023 GT4 European Series
GT4 European Series	Silver Teams: (Switzerland) Hofor Racing by Bonk Motorsport	2023 GT4 European Series
GT4 European Series	Pro-Am: (France) Grégory Guilvert; Pro-Am: (France) Christophe Hamon	2023 GT4 European Series
GT4 European Series	Pro-Am Teams: (France) Saintéloc Junior Team	2023 GT4 European Series
GT4 European Series	Am: (France) Alban Varutti	2023 GT4 European Series
GT4 European Series	Am Teams: (France) AVR-Avvatar	2023 GT4 European Series
IMSA SportsCar Championship	GTP: (Brazil) Pipo Derani; GTP: (United Kingdom) Alexander Sims	2023 IMSA SportsCar Championship
IMSA SportsCar Championship	GTP Teams: (United States) #31 Whelen Engineering Racing	2023 IMSA SportsCar Championship
IMSA SportsCar Championship	GTP Manufacturers: (United States) Cadillac	2023 IMSA SportsCar Championship
IMSA SportsCar Championship	LMP2: (United States) Ben Keating; LMP2: (France) Paul-Loup Chatin	2023 IMSA SportsCar Championship
IMSA SportsCar Championship	LMP2 Teams: (United States) #52 PR1/Mathiasen Motorsports	2023 IMSA SportsCar Championship
IMSA SportsCar Championship	LMP3: (United States) Gar Robinson	2023 IMSA SportsCar Championship
IMSA SportsCar Championship	LMP3 Teams: (United States) #74 Riley Motorsports	2023 IMSA SportsCar Championship
IMSA SportsCar Championship	GTD Pro: (United Kingdom) Ben Barnicoat; GTD Pro: (United Kingdom) Jack Hawksworth	2023 IMSA SportsCar Championship
IMSA SportsCar Championship	GTD Pro Teams: (United States) #14 Vasser Sullivan Racing	2023 IMSA SportsCar Championship
IMSA SportsCar Championship	GTD Pro Manufacturers: (Japan) Lexus	2023 IMSA SportsCar Championship
IMSA SportsCar Championship	GTD: (United States) Bryan Sellers; GTD: (United States) Madison Snow	2023 IMSA SportsCar Championship
IMSA SportsCar Championship	GTD Teams: (United States) #1 Paul Miller Racing	2023 IMSA SportsCar Championship
IMSA SportsCar Championship	GTD Manufacturers: (Germany) BMW	2023 IMSA SportsCar Championship
IMSA VP Racing SportsCar Challenge	LMP3: (United States) Bijoy Garg	2023 IMSA VP Racing SportsCar Challenge
IMSA VP Racing SportsCar Challenge	LMP3 Teams: (United States) #3 Jr III Racing	2023 IMSA VP Racing SportsCar Challenge
IMSA VP Racing SportsCar Challenge	LMP3 Bronze Cup: (United States) Dan Goldburg	2023 IMSA VP Racing SportsCar Challenge
IMSA VP Racing SportsCar Challenge	GSX: (United States) Francis Selldorff	2023 IMSA VP Racing SportsCar Challenge
IMSA VP Racing SportsCar Challenge	GSX Teams: (United States) #95 Turner Motorsport	2023 IMSA VP Racing SportsCar Challenge
IMSA VP Racing SportsCar Challenge	GSX Manufacturers: (Germany) BMW	2023 IMSA VP Racing SportsCar Challenge
IMSA VP Racing SportsCar Challenge	GSX Bronze Cup: (United States) Vincent Barletta	2023 IMSA VP Racing SportsCar Challenge
Intercontinental GT Challenge	(Andorra) Jules Gounon	2023 Intercontinental GT Challenge
Intercontinental GT Challenge	Manufacturers: (Germany) Mercedes-AMG	2023 Intercontinental GT Challenge
Intercontinental GT Challenge	Independent Cup: (Hong Kong) Jonathan Hui	2023 Intercontinental GT Challenge
International GT Open	(Germany) Christopher Haase (Austria) Simon Reicher	2023 International GT Open
International GT Open	Teams: (Austria) Eastalent Racing	2023 International GT Open
International GT Open	Pro-Am: (Italy) Eddie Cheever III; Pro-Am: (Italy) Marco Pulcini	2023 International GT Open
International GT Open	Am: (Germany) Heiko Neumann; Am: (Germany) Timo Rumpfkeil	2023 International GT Open
Italian GT Championship	Endurance: (Italy) Giancarlo Fisichella; Endurance: (Italy) Tommaso Mosca	2023 Italian GT Championship
Italian GT Championship	Endurance Teams: (Italy) Scuderia Baldini 27	2023 Italian GT Championship
Italian GT Championship	Endurance GT3 Pro-Am: (Italy) Stefano Comandini; Endurance GT3 Pro-Am: (Italy) Marco Cassarà; Endurance GT3 Pro-Am: (Sweden) Alfred Nilsson	2023 Italian GT Championship
Italian GT Championship	Endurance GT3 Am: (Italy) Fulvio Ferri; Endurance GT3 Am: (Italy) Alberto "Naska" Fontana; Endurance GT3 Am: (Italy) Alessandro Marchetti	2023 Italian GT Championship
Italian GT Championship	Endurance GT Cup Pro-Am: (Italy) Luca Demarchi; Endurance GT Cup Pro-Am: (Italy) Simone Patrinicola; Endurance GT Cup Pro-Am: (Italy) Sabatino Di Mare	2023 Italian GT Championship
Italian GT Championship	Endurance GT Cup Am: (Italy) Alessio Caiola; Endurance GT Cup Am: (Italy) Alessandro Fabi; Endurance GT Cup Am: (Italy) Riccardo Ianiello	2023 Italian GT Championship
Italian GT Championship	Sprint: (Germany) Jens Klingmann; Sprint: (Canada) Bruno Spengler	2023 Italian GT Championship
Italian GT Championship	Sprint Teams: (Italy) Vincenzo Sospiri Racing	2023 Italian GT Championship
Italian GT Championship	Sprint GT3 Pro-Am: (United States) Philippe Denes; Sprint GT3 Pro-Am: (Kyrgyzstan) Dmitri Gvazava	2023 Italian GT Championship
Italian GT Championship	Sprint GT3 Am: (Italy) Giuseppe Fascicolo; Sprint GT3 Am: (Italy) Massimo Ciglia	2023 Italian GT Championship
Italian GT Championship	Sprint GT Cup Pro-Am: (Belgium) Gilles Stadsbader	2023 Italian GT Championship
Italian GT Championship	Sprint GT Cup Am: (Italy) Vincenzo Scarpetta	2023 Italian GT Championship
Le Mans Cup	LMP3: (Algeria) Julien Gerbi; LMP3: (France) Gillian Henrion	2023 Le Mans Cup
Le Mans Cup	LMP3 Teams: (Poland) No. 16 Team Virage	2023 Le Mans Cup
Le Mans Cup	GT3: (France) Valentin Hasse-Clot; GT3: (France) Arnold Robin	2023 Le Mans Cup
Le Mans Cup	GT3 Teams: (Switzerland) No. 10 Racing Spirit of Léman	2023 Le Mans Cup
Ligier European Series	JS P4: (Romania) Mihnea Ștefan	2023 Ligier European Series
Ligier European Series	JS P4 Teams: (Poland) #48 Team Virage	2023 Ligier European Series
Ligier European Series	JS2 R: (France) Julien Lemoine	2023 Ligier European Series
Ligier European Series	JS2 R Teams: (France) #42 ANS Motorsport	2023 Ligier European Series
Mazda MX-5 Cup	(United States) Jared Thomas	2023 Mazda MX-5 Cup
Mazda MX-5 Cup	Teams: (United States) JTR Motorsports Engineering	2023 Mazda MX-5 Cup
Michelin Pilot Challenge	GS: (United States) Robby Foley; GS: (United States) Vincent Barletta	2023 Michelin Pilot Challenge
Michelin Pilot Challenge	GS Teams: (United States) #96 Turner Motorsport	2023 Michelin Pilot Challenge
Michelin Pilot Challenge	GS Manufacturers: (Germany) Mercedes-AMG	2023 Michelin Pilot Challenge
Michelin Pilot Challenge	TCR: (Canada) Robert Wickens; TCR: (United States) Harry Gottsacker	2023 Michelin Pilot Challenge
Michelin Pilot Challenge	TCR Teams: (United States) #33 Bryan Herta Autosport with Curb-Agajanian	2023 Michelin Pilot Challenge
Michelin Pilot Challenge	TCR Manufacturers: (South Korea) Hyundai	2023 Michelin Pilot Challenge
Middle East Trophy	GT3: (Germany) Robert Renauer; GT3: (Germany) Alfred Renauer	2022–23 Middle East Trophy
Middle East Trophy	GT3 Teams: (Germany) Herberth Motorsport	2022–23 Middle East Trophy
Middle East Trophy	GT3 Pro-Am: (Germany) Elia Erhart; GT3 Pro-Am: (Austria) Michael Doppelmayr; GT3 Pro-Am: (Germany) Pierre Kaffer	2022–23 Middle East Trophy
Middle East Trophy	GT3 Pro-Am Teams: (Germany) Phoenix Racing	2022–23 Middle East Trophy
Middle East Trophy	GT3 Am: (United States) Charles Espenlaub; GT3 Am: (United States) Shane Lewis; GT3 Am: (United States) Charles Putman; GT3 Am: (United States) Joe Foster	2022–23 Middle East Trophy
Middle East Trophy	GT3 Am Teams: (United States) CP Racing	2022–23 Middle East Trophy
Middle East Trophy	992: (Italy) Sabino de Castro; 992: (Romania) Sergiu Nicolae; 992: (Italy) Fabrizio Broggi	2022–23 Middle East Trophy
Middle East Trophy	992 Teams: (Romania) Willi Motorsport by Ebimotors	2022–23 Middle East Trophy
Middle East Trophy	992 Am: (Qatar) Abdulla Ali Al Khelaifi	2022–23 Middle East Trophy
Middle East Trophy	992 Am Teams: (Germany) HRT Performance	2022–23 Middle East Trophy
Middle East Trophy	GTX: (Austria) Daniel Drexel	2022–23 Middle East Trophy
Middle East Trophy	GTX Teams: (Austria) razoon–more than racing	2022–23 Middle East Trophy
Middle East Trophy	GT4: (United Kingdom) David Holloway	2022–23 Middle East Trophy
Middle East Trophy	GT4 Teams: (United Kingdom) Century Motorsport	2022–23 Middle East Trophy
Middle East Trophy	TCR: (Latvia) Ivars Vallers; TCR: (Switzerland) Jasmin Preisig	2022–23 Middle East Trophy
Middle East Trophy	TCR Teams: (Switzerland) Wolf-Power Racing	2022–23 Middle East Trophy
Nürburgring Endurance Series	(Germany) Philipp Leisen (Norway) Oskar Sandberg (Germany) Daniel Zils	2023 Nürburgring Endurance Series
Nürburgring Endurance Series	Teams: (Germany) #34 Walkenhorst Motorsport	2023 Nürburgring Endurance Series
Nürburgring Endurance Series	SP9 Pro: (Germany) Marcel Marchewicz	2023 Nürburgring Endurance Series
Nürburgring Endurance Series	SP9 Pro Teams: (Germany) #34 Walkenhorst Motorsport	2023 Nürburgring Endurance Series
Nürburgring Endurance Series	SP9 Pro-Am: (Belgium) Maxime Dumarey	2023 Nürburgring Endurance Series
Nürburgring Endurance Series	SP9 Pro-Am Teams: (United States) #45 CP Racing	2023 Nürburgring Endurance Series
Nürburgring Endurance Series	SP9 Am: (Germany) Michael Heimrich; SP9 Am: (Germany) Lorenzo Rocco	2023 Nürburgring Endurance Series
Nürburgring Endurance Series	SP9 Am Teams: (Germany) #50 équipe vitesse	2023 Nürburgring Endurance Series
Nürburgring Endurance Series	SP10: (Germany) Thorsten Wolter; SP10: (Germany) Nick Wüstenhagen	2023 Nürburgring Endurance Series
Nürburgring Endurance Series	SP10 Teams: (Germany) #187 FK Performance Motorsport	2023 Nürburgring Endurance Series
Nürburgring Endurance Series	SP8T: (Germany) Reinhold Renger; SP8T: (Germany) Tim-Florian Wahl	2023 Nürburgring Endurance Series
Nürburgring Endurance Series	SP7: (Germany) Reiner Neuffer	2023 Nürburgring Endurance Series
Nürburgring Endurance Series	SP7 Teams: (Germany) #65 9und11 Racing	2023 Nürburgring Endurance Series
Nürburgring Endurance Series	SP4: (Germany) Jörg Schönfelder; SP4: (Germany) Serge van Vooren	2023 Nürburgring Endurance Series
Nürburgring Endurance Series	SP4T: (Belgium) "Brody"; SP4T: (Belgium) Jacques Derenne	2023 Nürburgring Endurance Series
Nürburgring Endurance Series	SP4T Teams: (Belgium) #266 HYRacing-AMC Sankt Vith	2023 Nürburgring Endurance Series
Nürburgring Endurance Series	SP3T: (Germany) Claudius Karch	2023 Nürburgring Endurance Series
Nürburgring Endurance Series	SP3T Teams: (Germany) #333 Schmickler Performance (powered by Ravenol)	2023 Nürburgring Endurance Series
Nürburgring Endurance Series	SP3: (Hungary) Adam Lengyel; SP3: (Hungary) Bendeguz Molnar	2023 Nürburgring Endurance Series
Nürburgring Endurance Series	SP3 Teams: (Hungary) #286 Car Competition Racing Team	2023 Nürburgring Endurance Series
Nürburgring Endurance Series	AT(-G): (Germany) Oliver Sprungmann	2023 Nürburgring Endurance Series
Nürburgring Endurance Series	AT(-G) Teams: (Germany) #420 Four Motors Bioconcept-Car	2023 Nürburgring Endurance Series
Nürburgring Endurance Series	TCR: (Germany) Mike Halder; TCR: (Switzerland) Roger Vögeli	2023 Nürburgring Endurance Series
Nürburgring Endurance Series	TCR Teams: (Norway) #801 Møller Bil Motorsport	2023 Nürburgring Endurance Series
Nürburgring Endurance Series	V6: (Germany) Lutz Rühl; V6: (Germany) Christian Büllesbach; V6: (Germany) Andreas Schettler	2023 Nürburgring Endurance Series
Nürburgring Endurance Series	V6 Teams: (Germany) #396 Adrenalin Motorsport Team Motec	2023 Nürburgring Endurance Series
Nürburgring Endurance Series	V5: (Germany) Daniel Korn; V5: (Germany) Tobias Korn; V5: (Germany) Ulrich Korn	2023 Nürburgring Endurance Series
Nürburgring Endurance Series	V5 Teams: (Germany) #444 Adrenalin Motorsport Team Motec	2023 Nürburgring Endurance Series
Nürburgring Endurance Series	V4: (Sweden) Dan Berghult; V5: (Finland) Juha Miettinen	2023 Nürburgring Endurance Series
Nürburgring Endurance Series	VT3: (Germany) Michael Eichhorn; VT3: (Germany) Tobias Jung	2023 Nürburgring Endurance Series
Nürburgring Endurance Series	VT3 Teams: (Germany) #474 Team Mathol Racing e.V.	2023 Nürburgring Endurance Series
Nürburgring Endurance Series	VT2-FWD: (Germany) Christian Alexander Dannesberger; VT2-FWD: (Germany) Daniel Mertens	2023 Nürburgring Endurance Series
Nürburgring Endurance Series	VT2-FWD Teams: (Germany) #491 Zierau Hochvolt by Mertens Motorsport	2023 Nürburgring Endurance Series
Nürburgring Endurance Series	VT2-R+4WD: (Germany) Philipp Leisen; VT2-R+4WD: (Norway) Oskar Sandberg; VT2-R+4WD: (Germany) Daniel Zils	2023 Nürburgring Endurance Series
Nürburgring Endurance Series	VT2-R+4WD Teams: (Germany) #1 Adrenalin Motorsport Team Motec	2023 Nürburgring Endurance Series
Nürburgring Endurance Series	NLS CUP2: (Germany) Nicholas Otto	2023 Nürburgring Endurance Series
Nürburgring Endurance Series	Porsche Endurance Trophy CUP2: (Germany) Christopher Brück; Porsche Endurance Trophy CUP2: (Germany) Moritz Kranz	2023 Nürburgring Endurance Series
Nürburgring Endurance Series	Porsche Endurance Trophy CUP2 Teams: (Germany) #121 KKrämer Racing	2023 Nürburgring Endurance Series
Nürburgring Endurance Series	CUP2 Am-Wertung: (Germany) Klaus Abbelen; CUP2 Am-Wertung: (United Kingdom) "Jules"	2023 Nürburgring Endurance Series
Nürburgring Endurance Series	NLS CUP3: (Germany) Heiko Eichenberg; NLS CUP3: (Switzerland) Patrik Grütter; NLS CUP3: (Germany) Fabio Grosse	2023 Nürburgring Endurance Series
Nürburgring Endurance Series	Porsche Endurance Trophy CUP3: (Germany) Heiko Eichenberg; Porsche Endurance Trophy CUP3: (Switzerland) Patrik Grütter; Porsche Endurance Trophy CUP3: (Germany) Fabio Grosse	2023 Nürburgring Endurance Series
Nürburgring Endurance Series	Porsche Endurance Trophy CUP3 Teams: (Germany) #959 SRS Team Sorg Rennsport	2023 Nürburgring Endurance Series
Nürburgring Endurance Series	CUP3 Am-Wertung: (Germany) Stefan Beyer; CUP3 Am-Wertung: (Germany) Carl-Friedrich Kolb	2023 Nürburgring Endurance Series
Nürburgring Endurance Series	BMW M240i Cup: (Germany) Sven Markert; BMW M240i Cup: (Germany) Nils Steinberg; BMW M240i Cup: (Germany) Yannick Fübrich	2023 Nürburgring Endurance Series
Nürburgring Endurance Series	BMW M240i Cup Teams: (Germany) #650 Adrenalin Motorsport Team Motec	2023 Nürburgring Endurance Series
Nürburgring Endurance Series	BMW M2 CS Cup: (Switzerland) Ranko Mijatović	2023 Nürburgring Endurance Series
Nürburgring Endurance Series	H4: (Germany) Bernd Kleeschulte	2023 Nürburgring Endurance Series
Prototype Challenge	(Luxembourg) Alain Berg (Belgium) Patrick Engelen	2023 Prototype Challenge
Prototype Challenge	Radical: (Netherlands) Eddie van Dam	2023 Prototype Challenge
Prototype Cup Germany	(Luxembourg) Gary Hauser (Germany) Markus Pommer	2023 Prototype Cup Germany
Prototype Cup Germany	Teams: (Luxembourg) Racing Experience	2023 Prototype Cup Germany
Prototype Cup Germany	Junior: (Netherlands) Mark van der Snel	2023 Prototype Cup Germany
Prototype Cup Germany	Trophy: (Netherlands) Mark van der Snel	2023 Prototype Cup Germany
Sports Car Championship Canada	GT4: (Canada) Jack Polito	2023 Sports Car Championship Canada
Sports Car Championship Canada	TCR: (Canada) Dean Baker	2023 Sports Car Championship Canada
Sports Car Championship Canada	TCA: (Canada) Trevor Hill	2023 Sports Car Championship Canada
Super GT	GT500: (Japan) Sho Tsuboi; GT500: (Japan) Ritomo Miyata	2023 Super GT Series
Super GT	Teams: (Japan) TGR Team au TOM'S	2023 Super GT Series
Super GT	GT300: (Japan) Hiroki Yoshida; GT300: (Japan) Kohta Kawaai	2023 Super GT Series
Super GT	GT300 Teams: (Japan) Saitama Toyopet Green Brave	2023 Super GT Series
Super Taikyū Series	ST-X: (Japan) #14 Zhongsheng ROOKIE Racing	2023 Super Taikyu Series
Super Taikyū Series	ST-Z: (Japan) #52 Saitama Toyopet GreenBrave	2023 Super Taikyu Series
Super Taikyū Series	ST-TCR: (Japan) #97 M&K Racing	2023 Super Taikyu Series
Super Taikyū Series	ST-1: (Japan) #2 K's Frontier KTM Cars	2023 Super Taikyu Series
Super Taikyū Series	ST-2: (Japan) #743 Honda R&D Challenge	2023 Super Taikyu Series
Super Taikyū Series	ST-3: (Japan) #38 Tracy Sports with Delta	2023 Super Taikyu Series
Super Taikyū Series	ST-4: (Japan) #41 Tracy Sports with Delta	2023 Super Taikyu Series
Super Taikyū Series	ST-5: (Japan) #72 Nihon Automobile College	2023 Super Taikyu Series
Supercar Challenge	GT: (Netherlands) Max Tubben; GT: (Netherlands) Max Weering	2023 Supercar Challenge
Supercar Challenge	GT Trophy: (Netherlands) Cees Wijsman	2023 Supercar Challenge
Supercar Challenge	Supersport 1: (Netherlands) Laurens de Wit	2023 Supercar Challenge
Supercar Challenge	Supersport 2: (Netherlands) Maik Broerson	2023 Supercar Challenge
Supercar Challenge	Sport 1: (Netherlands) Mark Jobst; Sport 1: (Netherlands) Oscar Vianen	2023 Supercar Challenge
Supercar Challenge	Sport 2: (Belgium) Robin Dries; Sport 2: (Belgium) Samuel Hilgers	2023 Supercar Challenge
Superrace Championship	(South Korea) Lee Chan-joon	2023 Superrace Championship
Superrace Championship	Teams: (South Korea) ECSTA Racing	2023 Superrace Championship
Thailand Super Series	GT3: (Thailand) Nattapong Horthongkum; GT3: (Thailand) Manat Kulapalanont	2023 Thailand Super Series
Thailand Super Series	GTM: (Thailand) Phaophong Chanchalia; GTM: (Thailand) Jakraphan Davee	2023 Thailand Super Series
Thailand Super Series	GT4: (Thailand) Chanon Asavasangsidhi; GT4: (Madagascar) Iaro Razanakoto	2023 Thailand Super Series
Thailand Super Series	GTC: (Thailand) Thanapongpan Sutumno	2023 Thailand Super Series
Thailand Super Series	Pickup: (Thailand) Thanaphon Chucharoenpon	2023 Thailand Super Series
Thailand Super Series	Compact: (Thailand) Thanaroj Tanasitnitikate; Compact: (Thailand) Chattraphol Jiemvijid	2023 Thailand Super Series
Thailand Super Series	Eco: (Thailand) Athipong Khumtong	2023 Thailand Super Series
Toyota Finance 86 Championship	(New Zealand) Brock Gilchrist	2023 Toyota Finance 86 Championship
Toyota Finance 86 Championship	Rookies: (Australia) Rylan Gray	2023 Toyota Finance 86 Championship
Toyota Finance 86 Championship	Masters: (New Zealand) John Penny	2023 Toyota Finance 86 Championship
TGR GR86/BRZ Cup	Professional Series: (Japan) Takuto Iguchi	2023 Toyota Gazoo Racing GR86/BRZ Cup
TGR GR86/BRZ Cup	Clubman Series: (Japan) Kōta Matsui	2023 Toyota Gazoo Racing GR86/BRZ Cup
Ultimate Cup Series	Proto Overall: (United Kingdom) George King	2023 Ultimate Cup Series
Ultimate Cup Series	Proto LMP3: (United Kingdom) George King	2023 Ultimate Cup Series
Ultimate Cup Series	Proto LMP3 Ultimate: (Austria) Martin Böhm; Proto LMP3 Ultimate: (Austria) Andreas Fojtik	2023 Ultimate Cup Series
Ultimate Cup Series	NP02: (Switzerland) Nicolas Maulini; NP02: (France) Jacques Wolff	2023 Ultimate Cup Series
Ultimate Cup Series	NP02 Ultimate: (Monaco) Marc Faggionato; NP02 Ultimate: (France) Philippe Mondolot	2023 Ultimate Cup Series
Ultimate Cup Series	CN: (Switzerland) Sacha Clavadetscher	2023 Ultimate Cup Series
Ultimate Cup Series	CN Ultimate: (Switzerland) Mike Fenzl; CN Ultimate: (Switzerland) Ivan Ruggiero; CN Ultimate: (Switzerland) Philipp Schlegel	2023 Ultimate Cup Series
Ultimate Cup Series	Prototype Challenge Teams: (Poland) Team Virage	2023 Ultimate Cup Series
Ultimate Cup Series	Endurance Overall: (France) Jean-Bernard Bouvet; Endurance Overall: (France) David Hallyday; Endurance Overall: (France) Jean-Paul Pagny	2023 Ultimate Cup Series
Ultimate Cup Series	Endurance 3A: (France) Jean-Bernard Bouvet; Endurance 3A: (France) David Hallyday; Endurance 3A: (France) Jean-Paul Pagny	2023 Ultimate Cup Series
Ultimate Cup Series	Endurance 3B: (France) Miguel Moiola	2023 Ultimate Cup Series
Ultimate Cup Series	Endurance PC: (France) Joffrey Dorchy; Endurance PC: (France) Mathieu Martins	2023 Ultimate Cup Series
Ultimate Cup Series	Endurance 4A: (Belgium) Daniel Waszczinsky	2023 Ultimate Cup Series
Ultimate Cup Series	Endurance 4B: (France) Julien Lemoine	2023 Ultimate Cup Series
Ultimate Cup Series	Endurance GT Touring Challenge Teams: (France) Martinet by Alméras	2023 Ultimate Cup Series
Ultimate Cup Series	Sprint 3A: (France) Eric Mouez	2023 Ultimate Cup Series
Ultimate Cup Series	Sprint 3A2: (Mexico) Alfredo Hernandez	2023 Ultimate Cup Series
Ultimate Cup Series	Sprint 3B: (Italy) Francesco Atzori	2023 Ultimate Cup Series
Ultimate Cup Series	Sprint PC: (France) Jérémy Faligand	2023 Ultimate Cup Series
Ultimate Cup Series	Sprint 4A: (France) Grégory Launier	2023 Ultimate Cup Series
Ultimate Cup Series	Sprint 4B: (Belgium) François Denis	2023 Ultimate Cup Series
Ultimate Cup Series	Sprint GT Touring Challenge Teams: (Italy) SR&R SRL	2023 Ultimate Cup Series
Lamborghini Super Trofeo
Lamborghini Super Trofeo Asia	Pro: (New Zealand) Marco Giltrap; Pro: (New Zealand) Chris van der Drift	2023 Lamborghini Super Trofeo Asia
Lamborghini Super Trofeo Asia	Pro-Am: (Hong Kong) Oscar Lee; Pro-Am: (Hong Kong) Dan Wells	2023 Lamborghini Super Trofeo Asia
Lamborghini Super Trofeo Asia	Am: (Thailand) Aniwat Lommahadthai; Am: (Thailand) Pasarit Promsombat	2023 Lamborghini Super Trofeo Asia
Lamborghini Super Trofeo Asia	LC Cup: (Thailand) Supachai Weeraborwornpong	2023 Lamborghini Super Trofeo Asia
Lamborghini Super Trofeo Europe	Pro: (New Zealand) Brendon Leitch	2023 Lamborghini Super Trofeo Europe
Lamborghini Super Trofeo Europe	Teams: (Italy) Vincenzo Sospiri Racing	2023 Lamborghini Super Trofeo Europe
Lamborghini Super Trofeo Europe	Pro-Am: (Poland) Andrzej Lewandowski	2023 Lamborghini Super Trofeo Europe
Lamborghini Super Trofeo Europe	Am: (Italy) Gabriele Rindone	2023 Lamborghini Super Trofeo Europe
Lamborghini Super Trofeo Europe	LC Cup: (San Marino) Luciano Privitelio; LC Cup: (France) Donovan Privitelio	2023 Lamborghini Super Trofeo Europe
Lamborghini Super Trofeo North America	Pro: (Costa Rica) Danny Formal; Pro: (Canada) Kyle Marcelli	2023 Lamborghini Super Trofeo North America
Lamborghini Super Trofeo North America	Teams: (United States) Wayne Taylor Racing with Andretti Autosport	2023 Lamborghini Super Trofeo North America
Lamborghini Super Trofeo North America	Dealer: (Florida) Palm Beach	2023 Lamborghini Super Trofeo North America
Lamborghini Super Trofeo North America	Pro-Am: (United States) Keawn Tandon	2023 Lamborghini Super Trofeo North America
Lamborghini Super Trofeo North America	Am: (United States) Glenn McGee; Am: (United States) Anthony McIntosh	2023 Lamborghini Super Trofeo North America
Lamborghini Super Trofeo North America	LC Cup: (United States) Mark Wilgus	2023 Lamborghini Super Trofeo North America
Porsche Supercup, Porsche Carrera Cup, GT3 Cup Challenge and Porsche Sprint Challenge
Porsche Supercup	(Denmark) Bastian Buus	2023 Porsche Supercup
Porsche Supercup	Teams: (Austria) BWT Lechner Racing	2023 Porsche Supercup
Porsche Supercup	Rookies: (France) Alessandro Ghiretti	2023 Porsche Supercup
Porsche Carrera Cup Asia	(France) Florian Latorre	2023 Porsche Carrera Cup Asia
Porsche Carrera Cup Asia	Teams: (China) Meidong Racing	2023 Porsche Carrera Cup Asia
Porsche Carrera Cup Asia	Pro-Am: (China) Bao Jinlong	2023 Porsche Carrera Cup Asia
Porsche Carrera Cup Asia	Am: (China) Yang Ruoyu	2023 Porsche Carrera Cup Asia
Porsche Carrera Cup Australia	(New Zealand) Callum Hedge	2023 Porsche Carrera Cup Australia
Porsche Carrera Cup Australia	Teams: (New Zealand) Earl Bamber Motorsport	2023 Porsche Carrera Cup Australia
Porsche Carrera Cup Australia	Pro-Am: (Australia) Adrian Flack	2023 Porsche Carrera Cup Australia
Porsche Carrera Cup France	(France) Dorian Boccolacci	2023 Porsche Carrera Cup France
Porsche Carrera Cup France	Teams: (France) Forestier Racing CLRT	2023 Porsche Carrera Cup France
Porsche Carrera Cup France	Pro-Am: (France) Jérôme Boullery	2023 Porsche Carrera Cup France
Porsche Carrera Cup France	Am: (France) Sébastien Poisson	2023 Porsche Carrera Cup France
Porsche Carrera Cup France	Rookies: (Belgium) Benjamin Paque	2023 Porsche Carrera Cup France
Porsche Carrera Cup Germany	(Netherlands) Larry ten Voorde	2023 Porsche Carrera Cup Germany
Porsche Carrera Cup Germany	Teams: (Netherlands) Team GP Elite	2023 Porsche Carrera Cup Germany
Porsche Carrera Cup Germany	Pro-Am: (Germany) Sören Spreng	2023 Porsche Carrera Cup Germany
Porsche Carrera Cup Germany	Rookies: (Germany) Theo Oeverhaus	2023 Porsche Carrera Cup Germany
Porsche Carrera Cup Great Britain	Pro: (United Kingdom) Adam Smalley	2023 Porsche Carrera Cup Great Britain
Porsche Carrera Cup Great Britain	Pro-Am: (United Kingdom) Max Bird	2023 Porsche Carrera Cup Great Britain
Porsche Carrera Cup Great Britain	Am: (United Kingdom) Justin Sherwood	2023 Porsche Carrera Cup Great Britain
Porsche Carrera Cup Great Britain	Rookies: (United Kingdom) Harry Foster	2023 Porsche Carrera Cup Great Britain
Porsche Carrera Cup Great Britain	Teams: (United Kingdom) Century Motorsport	2023 Porsche Carrera Cup Great Britain
Porsche Carrera Cup Italy	(Netherlands) Larry ten Voorde	2023 Porsche Carrera Cup Italy
Porsche Carrera Cup Italy	Teams: (Italy) Dinamic Motorsport	2023 Porsche Carrera Cup Italy
Porsche Carrera Cup Italy	Rookies: (Italy) Alberto De Amicis	2023 Porsche Carrera Cup Italy
Porsche Carrera Cup Japan	(Japan) Ryō Ogawa	2023 Porsche Carrera Cup Japan
Porsche Carrera Cup Japan	Teams: (Japan) BINGO RACING	2023 Porsche Carrera Cup Japan
Porsche Carrera Cup Japan	Pro-Am: (Japan) 'Motoki'	2023 Porsche Carrera Cup Japan
Porsche Carrera Cup Japan	Am: (Chinese Taipei) Tiger Wu	2023 Porsche Carrera Cup Japan
Porsche Carrera Cup North America	(United States) Riley Dickinson	2023 Porsche Carrera Cup North America
Porsche Carrera Cup North America	Teams: (United States) Kelly-Moss Road and Race	2023 Porsche Carrera Cup North America
Porsche Carrera Cup North America	Pro-Am: (Dominican Republic) Efrin Castro	2023 Porsche Carrera Cup North America
Porsche Carrera Cup North America	Am: (United States) Mark Kvamme	2023 Porsche Carrera Cup North America
Porsche Carrera Cup North America	Junior: (United States) Riley Dickinson	2023 Porsche Carrera Cup North America
Porsche Carrera Cup Scandinavia	(Sweden) Ola Nilsson	2023 Porsche Carrera Cup Scandinavia
Porsche Carrera Cup Scandinavia	Teams: (Sweden) Micke Kågered Racing	2023 Porsche Carrera Cup Scandinavia
Porsche Carrera Cup Scandinavia	Rookies: (Sweden) Mikael Karlsson	2023 Porsche Carrera Cup Scandinavia

== Stock car ==
Series	Champion	Refer
NASCAR Cup Series	(United States) Ryan Blaney	2023 NASCAR Cup Series
NASCAR Cup Series	Manufacturers: (United States) Chevrolet	2023 NASCAR Cup Series
NASCAR Xfinity Series	(United States) Cole Custer	2023 NASCAR Xfinity Series
NASCAR Xfinity Series	Manufacturers: (United States) Chevrolet	2023 NASCAR Xfinity Series
NASCAR Craftsman Truck Series	(United States) Ben Rhodes	2023 NASCAR Craftsman Truck Series
NASCAR Craftsman Truck Series	Manufacturers: (United States) Chevrolet	2023 NASCAR Craftsman Truck Series
NASCAR Brasil Sprint Race	PRO: (Brazil) Léo Torres	2023 NASCAR Brasil Sprint Race
NASCAR Brasil Sprint Race	PROAM: (Brazil) Leonardo Reis; PROAM: (Brazil) Rafael Reis	2023 NASCAR Brasil Sprint Race
NASCAR Brasil Sprint Race	AM: (Brazil) Henry Couto	2023 NASCAR Brasil Sprint Race
NASCAR Mexico Series	(Mexico) Salvador de Alba	2023 NASCAR Mexico Series
NASCAR Pinty's Series	(Canada) Treyten Lapcevich	2023 NASCAR Pinty's Series
NASCAR Pinty's Series	Manufacturers: (United States) Chevrolet	2023 NASCAR Pinty's Series
NASCAR Whelen Euro Series	EuroNASCAR PRO: (Italy) Gianmarco Ercoli	2023 NASCAR Whelen Euro Series
NASCAR Whelen Euro Series	Teams: (France) RDV Competition	2023 NASCAR Whelen Euro Series
NASCAR Whelen Euro Series	EuroNASCAR 2: (France) Paul Jouffreau	2023 NASCAR Whelen Euro Series
NASCAR Whelen Modified Tour	(United States) Ron Silk	2023 NASCAR Whelen Modified Tour
ARCA Menards Series	(United States) Jesse Love	2023 ARCA Menards Series
ARCA Menards Series East	(United States) William Sawalich	2023 ARCA Menards Series East
ARCA Menards Series West	(United States) Sean Hingorani	2023 ARCA Menards Series West
Turismo Carretera	(Argentina) Mariano Werner	2023 Turismo Carretera
Turismo Carretera	Copa de Oro: (Argentina) Mariano Werner	2023 Turismo Carretera

== Touring car ==
Series	Champion	Refer
Aussie Racing Cars	(Australia) Joel Heinrich	2023 Aussie Racing Car Series
Aussie Racing Cars	Rookies: (Australia) Nathan Williams	2023 Aussie Racing Car Series
Aussie Racing Cars	Gold Cup: (Australia) Sheridan Phillips	2023 Aussie Racing Car Series
Aussie Racing Cars	Masters Cup: (Australia) Kent Quinn	2023 Aussie Racing Car Series
British Touring Car Championship	(United Kingdom) Ashley Sutton	2023 British Touring Car Championship
British Touring Car Championship	Teams: (United Kingdom) NAPA Racing UK	2023 British Touring Car Championship
British Touring Car Championship	Manufacturers: (United Kingdom) Alliance Racing / Ford	2023 British Touring Car Championship
British Touring Car Championship	Independent: (United Kingdom) Josh Cook	2023 British Touring Car Championship
British Touring Car Championship	Independent Teams: (United Kingdom) One Motorsport with Starline Racing	2023 British Touring Car Championship
British Touring Car Championship	Jack Sears Trophy: (United Kingdom) Andrew Watson	2023 British Touring Car Championship
British Touring Car Championship	Goodyear Wingfoot Award: (United Kingdom) Ashley Sutton	2023 British Touring Car Championship
China Touring Car Championship	Super Cup (TCR China): Cao Hongwei	2023 China Touring Car Championship
China Touring Car Championship	Super Cup Teams: (China) Shell Gemini Lynk & Co	2023 China Touring Car Championship
China Touring Car Championship	Sports Cup: (China) No. 15 OUR Racing	2023 China Touring Car Championship
China Touring Car Championship	Sports Cup Teams: (China) Jiren Tianxiang Racing Team	2023 China Touring Car Championship
Global Touring Car Championship	(South Africa) Robert Wolk	2023 Global Touring Car Championship
Global Touring Car Championship	Manufacturers: (Japan) Toyota	2023 Global Touring Car Championship
Global Touring Car Championship	GTC SupaCup: (South Africa) Brad Liebenberg	2023 Global Touring Car Championship
Global Touring Car Championship	Masters: (South Africa) Danie van Niekerk	2023 Global Touring Car Championship
Russian Circuit Racing Series	TCR: (Russia) Dmitry Bragin	2023 Russian Circuit Racing Series
Russian Circuit Racing Series	TCR Teams: (Russia) Lukoil Racing Team	2023 Russian Circuit Racing Series
Russian Circuit Racing Series	Super Production: (Russia) Mikhail Mityaev	2023 Russian Circuit Racing Series
Russian Circuit Racing Series	Super Production Teams: (Russia) LADA Sport Rosneft	2023 Russian Circuit Racing Series
Russian Circuit Racing Series	Touring Light: (Russia) Mikhail Simonov	2023 Russian Circuit Racing Series
Russian Circuit Racing Series	Touring Light Teams: (Russia) Bragin Racing Team	2023 Russian Circuit Racing Series
Russian Circuit Racing Series	S1600: (Russia) Artem Antonov	2023 Russian Circuit Racing Series
Russian Circuit Racing Series	SMP GT4 Russia: Rinat Salikhov	2023 Russian Circuit Racing Series
Russian Circuit Racing Series	SMP GT4 Russia Teams: Yadro Motorsport	2023 Russian Circuit Racing Series
Stock Car Pro Series	(Brazil) Gabriel Casagrande	2023 Stock Car Pro Series
Stock Car Pro Series	Teams: (Brazil) RC Competições	2023 Stock Car Pro Series
Stock Series	(Brazil) Zezinho Muggiati	2023 Stock Series
Stock Series	Teams: (Brazil) W2 ProGP	2023 Stock Series
Stock Series	Rookies: (Brazil) Arthur Gama	2023 Stock Series
Supercars Championship	(Australia) Brodie Kostecki	2023 Supercars Championship
Supercars Championship	Teams: (Australia) Erebus Motorsport	2023 Supercars Championship
Supercars Championship	Manufacturers: (United States) Chevrolet	2023 Supercars Championship
Super2 Series	(Australia) Kai Allen	2023 Super2 Series
Super2 Series	Super3: (Australia) Jobe Stewart	2023 Super2 Series
TC America Series	TCX: (United States) Colin Garrett	2023 TC America Series
TC America Series	TCX Teams: (United States) Rooster Hall Racing	2023 TC America Series
TC America Series	TC: (United States) Clayton Williams	2023 TC America Series
TC America Series	TC Teams: (United States) MINI JCW Team	2023 TC America Series
TC America Series	TCA: (United States) Spencer Bucknum	2023 TC America Series
TC America Series	TCA Teams: (United States) TechSport Racing	2023 TC America Series
TC2000 Championship	(Argentina) Leonel Pernía	2023 TC2000 Championship
TC2000 Championship	Teams: (Argentina) Ambrogio Racing	2023 TC2000 Championship
TC2000 Championship	Manufacturers: (France) Renault	2023 TC2000 Championship
Touring Car Masters	(Australia) Steven Johnson	2023 Touring Car Masters
Touring Car Masters	Pro-Master: (Australia) Steven Johnson	2023 Touring Car Masters
Touring Car Masters	Pro-Am: (Australia) Cameron Tilley	2023 Touring Car Masters
Touring Car Masters	Pro-Sports: (Australia) Peter Burnitt	2023 Touring Car Masters
TCR Touring Car
TCR World Tour	(Hungary) Norbert Michelisz	2023 TCR World Tour
TCR World Tour	Teams: (Sweden) Cyan Racing Lynk & Co	2023 TCR World Tour
24H TCE Series	TCR: (Norway) Roy Edland; TCR: (Denmark) Jonas Holmgaard; TCR: (Denmark) Magnus Holmgaard	2023 24H TCE Series
24H TCE Series	TCR Teams: (Denmark) No. 102 Holmgaard Motorsport	2023 24H TCE Series
24H TCE Series	TC: (Germany) Michael Bonk; TC: (Switzerland) Martin Kroll	2023 24H TCE Series
24H TCE Series	TC Teams: (Switzerland) No. 331 Hofor Racing by Bonk Motorsport	2023 24H TCE Series
TCR Australia Touring Car Series	(Australia) Josh Buchan	2023 TCR Australia Touring Car Series
TCR Brazil Touring Car Championship	(Brazil) Galid Osman	2023 TCR Brazil Touring Car Championship
TCR Brazil Touring Car Championship	Teams: (Brazil) W2 ProGP	2023 TCR Brazil Touring Car Championship
TCR Brazil Touring Car Championship	Trophy: (Brazil) Guilherme Reischl	2023 TCR Brazil Touring Car Championship
TCR China Touring Car Championship	(China) Cao Hongwei	2023 TCR China Touring Car Championship
TCR China Touring Car Championship	Teams: (South Korea) Hyundai N Team	2023 TCR China Touring Car Championship
TCR China Touring Car Championship	Am Cup: (China) Liu Zichen	2023 TCR China Touring Car Championship
TCR Denmark Touring Car Series	(Denmark) Kasper Jensen	2023 TCR Denmark Touring Car Series
TCR Denmark Touring Car Series	Teams: (Denmark) GMB Motorsport	2023 TCR Denmark Touring Car Series
TCR Denmark Touring Car Series	Constructors: (Japan) Honda	2023 TCR Denmark Touring Car Series
TCR Denmark Touring Car Series	Trophy: (Denmark) René Povlsen	2023 TCR Denmark Touring Car Series
TCR Denmark Touring Car Series	U25: (Denmark) Gustav Birch	2023 TCR Denmark Touring Car Series
TCR Eastern Europe Trophy	(Slovakia) Mat'o Homola	2023 TCR Eastern Europe Trophy
TCR Eastern Europe Trophy	Teams: (Czech Republic) Janik Motorsport	2023 TCR Eastern Europe Trophy
TCR Eastern Europe Trophy	Junior: (Germany) Rene Kircher	2023 TCR Eastern Europe Trophy
TCR Eastern Europe Trophy	Trophy: (Poland) Sebastian Kolakowski	2023 TCR Eastern Europe Trophy
TCR Europe Touring Car Series	(Netherlands) Tom Coronel	2023 TCR Europe Touring Car Series
TCR Europe Touring Car Series	Teams: (Belgium) Comtoyou Racing	2023 TCR Europe Touring Car Series
TCR Europe Touring Car Series	Diamond Trophy: (Netherlands) Tom Coronel	2023 TCR Europe Touring Car Series
TCR Europe Touring Car Series	Rookies: (Belgium) Kobe Pauwels	2023 TCR Europe Touring Car Series
TCR Italy Touring Car Championship	(Argentina) Franco Girolami	2023 TCR Italy Touring Car Championship
TCR Italy Touring Car Championship	Teams: (Italy) Aikoa Racing	2023 TCR Italy Touring Car Championship
TCR Italy Touring Car Championship	DSG: (Turkey) Vedat Ali Dalokay	2023 TCR Italy Touring Car Championship
TCR Italy Touring Car Championship	Masters: (Italy) Denis Babuin	2023 TCR Italy Touring Car Championship
TCR Italy Touring Car Championship	Under-25: (Italy) Marco Butti	2023 TCR Italy Touring Car Championship
TCR Japan Touring Car Series	Saturday Series: (Japan) Anna Inotsume	2023 TCR Japan Touring Car Series
TCR Japan Touring Car Series	Sunday Series: (Japan) Anna Inotsume	2023 TCR Japan Touring Car Series
TCR Japan Touring Car Series	Teams: (Japan) Birth Racing Project	2023 TCR Japan Touring Car Series
TCR South America Touring Car Championship	(Argentina) Ignacio Montenegro	2023 TCR South America Touring Car Championship
TCR South America Touring Car Championship	Teams: (Argentina) Squadra Martino	2023 TCR South America Touring Car Championship
TCR South America Touring Car Championship	Trophy: (Brazil) Fabio Casagrande	2023 TCR South America Touring Car Championship
TCR Taiwan Series	(Taiwan) Shih Shih-Wei	2023 TCR Taiwan Series
TCR Taiwan Series	Teams: (Taiwan) GH-Team AAI	2023 TCR Taiwan Series
TCR Taiwan Series	Trophy: (Taiwan) He Shu-Hsien	2023 TCR Taiwan Series
TCR UK Touring Car Championship	(United Kingdom) Carl Boardley	2023 TCR UK Touring Car Championship
TCR UK Touring Car Championship	Teams: (United Kingdom) Area Motorsport	2023 TCR UK Touring Car Championship
TCR UK Touring Car Championship	Trophy: (United Kingdom) Carl Boardley	2023 TCR UK Touring Car Championship

== Truck racing ==
Series	Champion	Refer
Copa Truck	(Brazil) Felipe Giaffone	2023 Copa Truck season
Copa Truck	Super: (Brazil) Thiago Rizzo	2023 Copa Truck season
European Truck Racing Championship	(Hungary) Norbert Kiss	2023 European Truck Racing Championship
European Truck Racing Championship	Teams: (Hungary) Révész Racing	2023 European Truck Racing Championship
European Truck Racing Championship	Promoters Cup: (Portugal) José Eduardo Rodrigues	2023 European Truck Racing Championship
Fórmula Truck	(Brazil) Pedro Muffato	2023 Fórmula Truck
Fórmula Truck	Teams: (Brazil) Muffatão/Açucareira Energy	2023 Fórmula Truck
Stadium Super Trucks	(United States) Gavin Harlien	2023 Stadium Super Trucks
SuperUtes Series	(Australia) Aaron Borg	2023 SuperUtes Series
