= 2023 Formula Car Challenge =

2023 formula racing championship

The 2023 Formula Car Challenge presented by Goodyear was the 19th season of the Formula Car Challenge. It was a multi-event motor racing championship for single-seater open wheel formula racing cars held across the American west coast. The series was sanctioned by the Sports Car Club of America.

Christian Okpysh took the title in the main Formula Mazda class, while Tao Takaoka and Joe Briggs were victorious in the Formula Speed and Pro Formula Mazda categories, respectively.

== Drivers ==
Drivers competed in three classes, Formula Mazda, Formula Speed and Pro Formula Mazda.

No.	Driver	Car	Rounds
Formula Mazda entries
7	(United States) Woody Yerxa	2001 Mazda Formula	3–4, 7–8, 11–14
12	(Canada) Marcus Brodie	1997 Mazda Formula Mazda	9–10
20	(United States) Ben Booker	Formula Mazda Star Formula Mazda	1–2, 7–8, 13–14
28	(United States) Stew Tabak	1993 Mazda Formula	7–14
29	(United States) Christian Okpysh	1997 Mazda Formula Mazda	3–6, 9–14
63	(Denmark) Lars Jensen	1997 Star Formula Mazda	3–14
67	(United States) Bill Weaver	1997 Star Mazda Formula Mazda	7–14
75	(United States) C.J. Ray	1998 Mazda Star Formula	3–14
77	(United States) Derry O'Donovan	1996 Formula Mazda FM	3–4, 7–14
78	(United States) Brad Drew	1997 Mazda Formula	3–4, 7–14
88	(United States) Randy Sturgeon	1997 Mazda Star Formula Mazda	5–6, 9–10
91	(United States) Ritchie Hollingsworth	1995 Mazda Formula Mazda	7–8, 13–14
92	(United States) Rick Bostrom	1988 Mazda Formula	13–14
120	(United States) John Ertel	1994 Mazda Formula Star	11–12
Formula Speed entries
27	(United States) Tao Takaoka	2015 Formula Speed F S 2.0	3–4, 7–14
46	(United States) Frank Russell	2012 Formula Speed 2.0	9–14
51	(United States) Scott Vreeland	1986 Ralt RT-5	3–4
Pro Formula Mazda entries
0	(United States) Edd Ozard	2004 Mazda Pro Mazda	1–2, 9–10
9	(United States) Joe Briggs	2004 Mazda Pro Formula Mazda	1–4, 9–12
10	(United States) Vincent Tjelmeland	Pro Formula Mazda	9–10
37	(United States) Nevin Spieker	2019 Mazda Pro Formula	3–4, 9–10
41	(United States) Robert Merritt	Pro Formula Mazda	9–10
42	(United States) Gregory Perrin	Star Mazda	9–12
51	(United States) Scott Vreeland	1986 Ralt RT-5	13–14
123	(United States) JD Stuart	Pro Formula Mazda	9–10

== Race calendar ==
The 2023 schedule was announced on 1 December 2022. All races were held in California. The series returned to Buttonwillow Raceway Park after not competing there in 2022.

Round	Circuit	Date	Support bill	Map of circuit locations
1	(United States) Sonoma Raceway, Sonoma	25 February	Formula Pro USA Winter Series; San Francisco Region SCCA Series	2023 Formula Car Challenge is located in California
2	(United States) Sonoma Raceway, Sonoma	26 February	Formula Pro USA Winter Series; San Francisco Region SCCA Series	2023 Formula Car Challenge is located in California
3	(United States) Thunderhill Raceway Park, Willows	15 April	Formula Pro USA Western Championship; San Francisco Region SCCA Series	2023 Formula Car Challenge is located in California
4	(United States) Thunderhill Raceway Park, Willows	16 April	Formula Pro USA Western Championship; San Francisco Region SCCA Series	2023 Formula Car Challenge is located in California
5	(United States) Buttonwillow Raceway Park, Buttonwillow	29 April	Formula Pro USA Western Championship; California Sports Car Club	2023 Formula Car Challenge is located in California
6	(United States) Buttonwillow Raceway Park, Buttonwillow	30 April	Formula Pro USA Western Championship; California Sports Car Club	2023 Formula Car Challenge is located in California
7	(United States) Thunderhill Raceway Park, Willows	3 June	Formula Pro USA Western Championship; San Francisco Region SCCA Series	2023 Formula Car Challenge is located in California
8	(United States) Thunderhill Raceway Park, Willows	4 June	Formula Pro USA Western Championship; San Francisco Region SCCA Series	2023 Formula Car Challenge is located in California
9	(United States) WeatherTech Raceway Laguna Seca, Monterey	29 July	San Francisco Region SCCA Series; Pacific F2000 Championship	2023 Formula Car Challenge is located in California
10	(United States) WeatherTech Raceway Laguna Seca, Monterey	30 July	San Francisco Region SCCA Series; Pacific F2000 Championship	2023 Formula Car Challenge is located in California
11	(United States) Sonoma Raceway, Sonoma	2 September	Formula Pro USA Western Championship; San Francisco Region SCCA Series	2023 Formula Car Challenge is located in California
12	(United States) Sonoma Raceway, Sonoma	3 September	Formula Pro USA Western Championship; San Francisco Region SCCA Series	2023 Formula Car Challenge is located in California
13	(United States) Thunderhill Raceway Park, Willows	28 October	San Francisco Region SCCA Series; Pacific Northwest Spec Miata Tour	2023 Formula Car Challenge is located in California
14	(United States) Thunderhill Raceway Park, Willows	29 October	San Francisco Region SCCA Series; Pacific Northwest Spec Miata Tour	2023 Formula Car Challenge is located in California

== Race results ==
Round	Circuit	Pole position	Fastest lap	Formula Mazda winner	Formula Speed winner	Pro Formula Mazda winner
1	(United States) Sonoma Raceway	(United States) Joe Briggs	(United States) Edd Ozard	(United States) Ben Booker	no entries	(United States) Joe Briggs
2	(United States) Sonoma Raceway	(United States) Joe Briggs	(United States) Joe Briggs	(United States) Ben Booker‡	no entries	(United States) Joe Briggs
3	(United States) Thunderhill Raceway Park	(United States) Joe Briggs	(United States) Joe Briggs	(United States) Christian Okpysh	(United States) Tao Takaoka	(United States) Joe Briggs
4	(United States) Thunderhill Raceway Park	(United States) Joe Briggs	(United States) Joe Briggs	(United States) Brad Drew	(United States) Tao Takaoka	(United States) Joe Briggs
5	(United States) Buttonwillow Raceway Park	(United States) Christian Okpysh	(United States) Christian Okpysh	(United States) Christian Okpysh	no entries	no entries
6	(United States) Buttonwillow Raceway Park	(United States) C.J. Ray	(United States) C.J. Ray	(United States) Christian Okpysh	no entries	no entries
7	(United States) Thunderhill Raceway Park	(United States) Tao Takaoka	(United States) Brad Drew	(United States) Bill Weaver	(United States) Tao Takaoka	no entries
8	(United States) Thunderhill Raceway Park	(United States) Derry O'Donovan	(United States) C.J. Ray	(United States) C.J. Ray	(United States) Tao Takaoka	no entries
9	(United States) WeatherTech Raceway Laguna Seca	(United States) Joe Briggs	(United States) Joe Briggs	(United States) Bill Weaver	(United States) Tao Takaoka	(United States) Joe Briggs
10	(United States) WeatherTech Raceway Laguna Seca	(United States) Joe Briggs	(United States) Joe Briggs	(United States) Bill Weaver	(United States) Frank Russell	(United States) Joe Briggs
11	(United States) Sonoma Raceway	(United States) Joe Briggs	(United States) Joe Briggs	(United States) Christian Okpysh	(United States) Tao Takaoka	(United States) Joe Briggs
12	(United States) Sonoma Raceway	(United States) Joe Briggs	(United States) Joe Briggs	(United States) Bill Weaver	(United States) Tao Takaoka	(United States) Joe Briggs
13	(United States) Thunderhill Raceway Park	(United States) Joe Briggs	(United States) Joe Briggs	(United States) Bill Weaver	(United States) Tao Takaoka	(United States) Joe Briggs
14	(United States) Thunderhill Raceway Park	(United States) Joe Briggs	(United States) Joe Briggs	(United States) Brad Drew	(United States) Tao Takaoka	(United States) Joe Briggs

‡ - event or race did not award any points as it did not meet all FCC rules

== Championship standings ==
=== Scoring system ===
==== Formula Mazda ====
Points were awarded to the top twenty drivers in each class taking the green flag.

Position	1st	2nd	3rd	4th	5th	6th	7th	8th	9th	10th	11th	12th	13th	14th	15th	16th	17th	18th	19th	20th
Points	29	25	22	20	19	18	17	16	15	14	13	12	11	10	9	8	7	6	5	4

==== Pro Formula Mazda and Formula Speed ====
As the Formula Speed and Pro Formula Mazda classes ran alongside the San Francisco Region SCCA's regional FX and FA3 classes respectively, they used their points system.

Position	1st	2nd	3rd	4th	5th	6th	7th	8th	9th	10th	11th	12th	13th	14th	15th	16th	17th	18th	19th	20th
Points	25	21	18	17	16	15	14	13	12	11	10	9	8	7	6	5	4	3	2	1

Each driver's four worst results were dropped.

=== Drivers' standings ===
Pos	Driver	SON1		THU1		BUT		THU2		LAG		SON2		THU3		Pts
Pos	Driver	R1	R2	R3	R4	R5	R6	R7	R8	R9	R10	R11	R12	R13	R14	Pts
Formula Mazda Standings
1	(United States) Christian Okpysh			1	2	1	1			2	3	1	3	2	4	255
2	(United States) Brad Drew			2	1			2	4	3	2	2	2	3	1	247
3	(United States) C.J. Ray			3	5	2	2	3	1	(7)	4	3	(9)	7	2	226
4	(United States) Bill Weaver							1	9	1	1	8	1	1	3	198
5	(Denmark) Lars Jensen			4	4	3	4	6	6	5	5	5	(8)	5	DNS	194
6	(United States) Derry O'Donovan			5	6			4	2	4	7	DNS	5	4	8	174
7	(United States) Woody Yerxa			6	3			5	3			6	6	9	6	150
8	(United States) Stew Tabak							7	5	6	6	4	4	6	5	149
9	(United States) Ben Booker	1	1‡					9	8					10	10	88
10	(United States) Ritchie Hollingsworth							8	7					8	7	66
11	(United States) Randy Sturgeon					4	3									42
12	(United States) John Ertel											7	7			34
13	(Canada) Marcus Brodie									8	8					32
14	(United States) Rick Bostrom													11	9	28
Formula Speed Standings
1	(United States) Tao Takaoka			1	1			1	1	1	2	1	1	1	1	246
2	(United States) Frank Russell									2	1	Ret	DNS	2	2	88
—	(United States) Scott Vreeland			DNS	DNS											—
Pro Formula Mazda Standings
1	(United States) Joe Briggs	1	1	1	1					1	1	1	1	1	1	250
2	(United States) Gregory Perrin									3	2	2	2			81
3	(United States) Nevin Spieker			2	DNS					2	3					60
4	(United States) Scott Vreeland													2	2	42
=5	(United States) Vincent Tjelmeland									5	4					33
=5	(United States) Robert Merritt									4	5					33
6	(United States) Edd Ozard	2	DNS							Ret	DNS					21
—	(United States) JD Stuart									Ret	DNS					—
Pos	Driver	R1	R2	R3	R4	R5	R6	R7	R8	R9	R10	R11	R12	R13	R14	Pts
Pos	Driver	SON1		THU1		BUT		THU2		LAG		SON2		THU3		Pts

‡ - event or race did not award any points as it did not meet all FCC rules
