= 2023 Formula Pro USA Western Championship =

Season of motorsports

The 2023 Formula Pro USA Western Series was the fourth season of the championship for Formula Regional and Formula 4 cars established in the West Coast of the United States. The championship was promoted and organized by Exclusive Racing and Exclusive Auctions, and ran under the same sporting regulations as the FIA-sanctioned Formula Regional Americas Championship and Formula 4 United States Championship.

== Teams and drivers ==
=== Formula Pro USA 3 (FPUSA-3) ===
All drivers competed with Honda-powered Ligier JS-F3 cars on Avon tires.

Team	No.	Driver	Rounds
Valley Kitchens	2	(Canada) Nicole Havrda	All
Kiwi Motorsports	02	(United States) Jett Bowling	11–12
Kiwi Motorsports	20	(United States) Jake Bonilla	9–10
World Speed Motorsports	3	(United States) Larry Schnur	3–6, 11–12
World Speed Motorsports	37	(United States) Jay Horak	1–6, 9–12

=== Formula Pro USA 4 (FPUSA-4) ===
All drivers competed with Honda-powered Ligier JS-F4 cars on Avon tires.

Team	No.	Driver	Rounds
World Motorsports	00	(United States) Alexander Cornfeld	1–6, 11–12
World Motorsports	17	(United States) Preston Lambert	5–8, 11–12
Jensen Motorsports	1	(Netherlands) Emely de Heus	11–12
Kiwi Motorsports	02	(United States) Jett Bowling	7–10
Doran Motorsports Group	24	(Australia) Daniel Quimby	7–8
Doran Motorsports Group	24	(United States) Barrett Wolfe	11–12
Doran Motorsports Group	33	(United States) Dmitry Pistolyako	All
Atlantic Racing Team	177	(Canada) James Lawley	1–6

== Race calendar ==
The 2023 calendar was planned to be held over twelve races spanning across six weekends. Compared to 2022, Buttonwillow Raceway Park joined the schedule, replacing one of the three rounds at Thunderhill Raceway Park. The weekend at Laguna Seca was cancelled mid-weekend due to issues with the newly-resurfaced track, meaning only ten races were held.

Round	Circuit	Date	Support bill	Map of circuit locations
R1	Thunderhill Raceway Park, Willows	April 15	Formula Car Challenge; San Francisco Region SCCA Series	2023 Formula Pro USA Western Championship is located in California
R2	Thunderhill Raceway Park, Willows	April 16	Formula Car Challenge; San Francisco Region SCCA Series	2023 Formula Pro USA Western Championship is located in California
R3	Buttonwillow Raceway Park, Buttonwillow	April 29	Formula Car Challenge; California Sports Car Club	2023 Formula Pro USA Western Championship is located in California
R4	Buttonwillow Raceway Park, Buttonwillow	April 30	Formula Car Challenge; California Sports Car Club	2023 Formula Pro USA Western Championship is located in California
R5	Thunderhill Raceway Park, Willows	June 3	Formula Car Challenge; San Francisco Region SCCA Series	2023 Formula Pro USA Western Championship is located in California
R6	Thunderhill Raceway Park, Willows	June 4	Formula Car Challenge; San Francisco Region SCCA Series	2023 Formula Pro USA Western Championship is located in California
R7	WeatherTech Raceway Laguna Seca, Monterey	July 1	Formula Car Challenge; San Francisco Region SCCA Series	2023 Formula Pro USA Western Championship is located in California
R8	WeatherTech Raceway Laguna Seca, Monterey	July 2	Formula Car Challenge; San Francisco Region SCCA Series	2023 Formula Pro USA Western Championship is located in California
R9	Sonoma Raceway, Sonoma	September 2	Formula Car Challenge; San Francisco Region SCCA Series	2023 Formula Pro USA Western Championship is located in California
R10	Sonoma Raceway, Sonoma	September 3	Formula Car Challenge; San Francisco Region SCCA Series	2023 Formula Pro USA Western Championship is located in California
R11	Buttonwillow Raceway Park, Buttonwillow	October 14	California Sports Car Club	2023 Formula Pro USA Western Championship is located in California
R12	Buttonwillow Raceway Park, Buttonwillow	October 15	California Sports Car Club	2023 Formula Pro USA Western Championship is located in California

== Race results ==
Rnd.	Circuit	FPUSA-3				FPUSA-4			
Rnd.	Circuit	Pole position	Fastest lap	Winning driver	Winning team	Pole position	Fastest lap	Winning driver	Winning team
R1	Thunderhill Raceway Park	(United States) Jay Horak	(United States) Jay Horak	(Canada) Nicole Havrda	Valley Kitchens	(United States) Dmitry Pistolyako	(Canada) James Lawley	(United States) Dmitry Pistolyako	Doran Motorsports Group
R2	Thunderhill Raceway Park	(Canada) Nicole Havrda	(United States) Jay Horak	(Canada) Nicole Havrda	Valley Kitchens	(United States) Dmitry Pistolyako	(United States) Dmitry Pistolyako	(United States) Dmitry Pistolyako	Doran Motorsports Group
R3	Buttonwillow Raceway Park	(Canada) Nicole Havrda	(Canada) Nicole Havrda	(Canada) Nicole Havrda	Valley Kitchens	(United States) Dmitry Pistolyako	(United States) Dmitry Pistolyako	(United States) Dmitry Pistolyako	Doran Motorsports Group
R4	Buttonwillow Raceway Park	(Canada) Nicole Havrda	(Canada) Nicole Havrda	(Canada) Nicole Havrda	Valley Kitchens	(United States) Dmitry Pistolyako	(United States) Dmitry Pistolyako	(United States) Dmitry Pistolyako	Doran Motorsports Group
R5	Thunderhill Raceway Park	(United States) Jay Horak	(United States) Jay Horak	(Canada) Nicole Havrda	Valley Kitchens	(United States) Preston Lambert	(Canada) James Lawley	(United States) Dmitry Pistolyako	Doran Motorsports Group
R6	Thunderhill Raceway Park	(Canada) Nicole Havrda	(Canada) Nicole Havrda	(Canada) Nicole Havrda	Valley Kitchens	(United States) Dmitry Pistolyako	(Canada) James Lawley	(Canada) James Lawley	Atlantic Racing Team
R7	WeatherTech Raceway Laguna Seca	race weekend cancelled due to damage to surface							
R8	WeatherTech Raceway Laguna Seca	race weekend cancelled due to damage to surface							
R9	Sonoma Raceway	(Canada) Nicole Havrda	(United States) Jay Horak	(United States) Jay Horak	World Speed Motorsports	(United States) Dmitry Pistolyako	(United States) Dmitry Pistolyako	(United States) Jett Bowling	Kiwi Motorsports
R10	Sonoma Raceway	(United States) Jay Horak	(United States) Jake Bonilla	(United States) Jake Bonilla	Kiwi Motorsports	(United States) Jett Bowling	(United States) Jett Bowling	(United States) Jett Bowling	Kiwi Motorsports
R11	Buttonwillow Raceway Park	(United States) Jett Bowling	(Canada) Nicole Havrda	(United States) Jay Horak	World Speed Motorsports	(United States) Preston Lambert	(United States) Preston Lambert	(United States) Preston Lambert	World Motorsports
R12	Buttonwillow Raceway Park	(Canada) Nicole Havrda	(Canada) Nicole Havrda	(Canada) Nicole Havrda	Valley Kitchens	(United States) Preston Lambert	(United States) Dmitry Pistolyako	(United States) Preston Lambert	World Motorsports

== Championship standings ==
Points were awarded as follows:

Position	1st	2nd	3rd	4th	5th	6th	7th	8th	9th	10th	FL
Points	25	18	15	12	10	8	6	4	2	1	2

=== Formula Pro USA 3 (FPUSA-3) ===
Pos	Driver	THU1		BUT1		THU2		LAG		SON		BUT2		Pts
Pos	Driver	R1	R2	R3	R4	R5	R6	R7	R8	R9	R10	R11	R12	Pts
1	(Canada) Nicole Havrda	1	1	1	1	1	1	C	C	DNS	3	3	1	215
2	(United States) Jay Horak	2	2	3	2	2	2			1	2	1	2	199
3	(United States) Larry Schnur			2	3	3	3					2	3	96
4	(United States) Jake Bonilla									2	1			45
5	(United States) Jett Bowling											4	DNS	12
Pos	Driver	R1	R2	R3	R4	R5	R6	R7	R8	R9	R10	R11	R12	Pts
Pos	Driver	THU1		BUT1		THU2		LAG		SON		BUT2		Pts

=== Formula Pro USA 4 (FPUSA-4) ===
Pos	Driver	THU1		BUT1		THU2		LAG		SON		BUT2		Pts
Pos	Driver	R1	R2	R3	R4	R5	R6	R7	R8	R9	R10	R11	R12	Pts
1	(United States) Dmitry Pistolyako	1	1	1	1	1	2	C	C	2	DNS	2	2	207
2	(United States) Alexander Cornfeld	3	2	2	2	4	3					4	3	123
3	(Canada) James Lawley	2	3	3	3	3	1							109
4	(United States) Preston Lambert					2	4	C	C			1	1	82
5	(United States) Jett Bowling							C	C	1	1			52
6	(United States) Barrett Wolfe											3	4	27
7	(Netherlands) Emely de Heus											5	DSQ	10
—	(Australia) Daniel Quimby							C	C					—
Pos	Driver	R1	R2	R3	R4	R5	R6	R7	R8	R9	R10	R11	R12	Pts
Pos	Driver	THU1		BUT1		THU2		LAG		SON		BUT2		Pts

== See also ==
- 2023 Formula Pro USA Winter Series
