= 25 Hours of Thunderhill =

Annual endurance racing event in Northern California

The 25 Hours of Thunderhill was an annual endurance racing event held at the Thunderhill Raceway Park in Willows, California.

From 2003 to 2023, it was sanctioned by the National Auto Sport Association (NASA). Starting in 2025, the NASA 25-hour race moved to Ozarks International Raceway in Missouri.

Since 2025, the 24 Hours of Lemons has held an annual "25 Hours + 1 Minute" endurance race at Thunderhill.

In both its NASA era and its Lemons era, the series has garnered significant national publicity.
