= 2023 Formula Pro USA Winter Series =

The 2023 Formula Pro USA Winter Series was the third season of the winter series for Formula Regional and Formula 4 cars held as counterpart to the Formula Pro USA Western Championships. As is the main series, the winter championship is promoted and organized by Exclusive Racing and Exclusive Auctions. The championship was run under the same sporting regulations as the FIA-sanctioned Formula Regional Americas Championship and Formula 4 United States Championship.

== Teams and drivers ==
=== Formula Pro USA 3 (FPUSA-3) ===
All drivers competed with Honda-powered Ligier JS-F3 cars on Avon tires.

Team	No.	Driver	Rounds
Valley Kitchens Racing	2	(Canada) Nicole Havrda	All
Doran Motorsports Group	12	(United States) David Burketh	All

=== Formula Pro USA 4 (FPUSA-4) ===
All drivers competed with Honda-powered Ligier JS-F4 cars on Avon tires.

Team	No.	Driver	Rounds
Doran Motorsports Group	24	(Australia) Daniel Quimby	All
Doran Motorsports Group	68	(Canada) Braydon Arthur	All
Atlantic Racing Team	177	(Canada) James Lawley	All

== Race calendar ==
The 2023 winter series calendar consisted of two rounds with two races each. Compared to 2022, Auto Club Speedway did not return to the schedule, with Thunderhill Raceway Park replacing it.

Round		Circuit	Date	Support bill
1	R1	Sonoma Raceway, Sonoma	February 25	Formula Car Challenge; San Francisco Region SCCA Series
1	R2	Sonoma Raceway, Sonoma	February 26	Formula Car Challenge; San Francisco Region SCCA Series
2	R1	Thunderhill Raceway Park, Willows	March 4	SVRA Sprint Series; Trans-Am Series; Pacific F2000 Championship; Ultimate Street Car Association
2	R2	Thunderhill Raceway Park, Willows	March 5	SVRA Sprint Series; Trans-Am Series; Pacific F2000 Championship; Ultimate Street Car Association

== Race results ==
Rnd.		Circuit	FPUSA-3				FPUSA-4			
Rnd.		Circuit	Pole position	Fastest lap	Winning driver	Winning team	Pole position	Fastest lap	Winning driver	Winning team
1	R1	Sonoma Raceway	(United States) David Burketh	(United States) David Burketh	(United States) David Burketh	Doran Motorsports Group	(Canada) Braydon Arthur	(Australia) Daniel Quimby	(Australia) Daniel Quimby	Doran Motorsports Group
1	R2	Sonoma Raceway	(Canada) Nicole Havrda	(United States) David Burketh	(United States) David Burketh	Doran Motorsports Group	(Australia) Daniel Quimby	(Australia) Daniel Quimby	(Australia) Daniel Quimby	Doran Motorsports Group
2	R1	Thunderhill Raceway Park	(Canada) Nicole Havrda	(Canada) Nicole Havrda	(Canada) Nicole Havrda	Valley Kitchens Racing	(Australia) Daniel Quimby	(Australia) Daniel Quimby	(Australia) Daniel Quimby	Doran Motorsports Group
2	R2	Thunderhill Raceway Park	(Canada) Nicole Havrda	(Canada) Nicole Havrda	(Canada) Nicole Havrda	Valley Kitchens Racing	(Australia) Daniel Quimby	(Australia) Daniel Quimby	(Australia) Daniel Quimby	Doran Motorsports Group

== Championship standings ==
Points were awarded as follows:

Position	1st	2nd	3rd	4th	5th	6th	7th	8th	9th	10th	FL
Points	25	18	15	12	10	8	6	4	2	1	2

=== Formula Pro USA 3 (FPUSA-3) ===
Pos	Driver	SON		THU		Pts
Pos	Driver	R1	R2	R1	R2	Pts
1	(Canada) Nicole Havrda	2	2	1	1	90
2	(United States) David Burketh	1	1	DNS	DNS	54
Pos	Driver	R1	R2	R1	R2	Pts
Pos	Driver	SON		THU		Pts

=== Formula Pro USA 4 (FPUSA-4) ===
Pos	Driver	SON		THU		Pts
Pos	Driver	R1	R2	R1	R2	Pts
1	(Australia) Daniel Quimby	1	1	1	1	106
2	(Canada) Braydon Arthur	3	2	2	3	68
3	(Canada) James Lawley	2	3	3	2	66
Pos	Driver	R1	R2	R1	R2	Pts
Pos	Driver	SON		THU		Pts

== See also ==
- 2023 Formula Pro USA Western Championship
