= Nicole Havrda =

Canadian racing driver (born 2006)

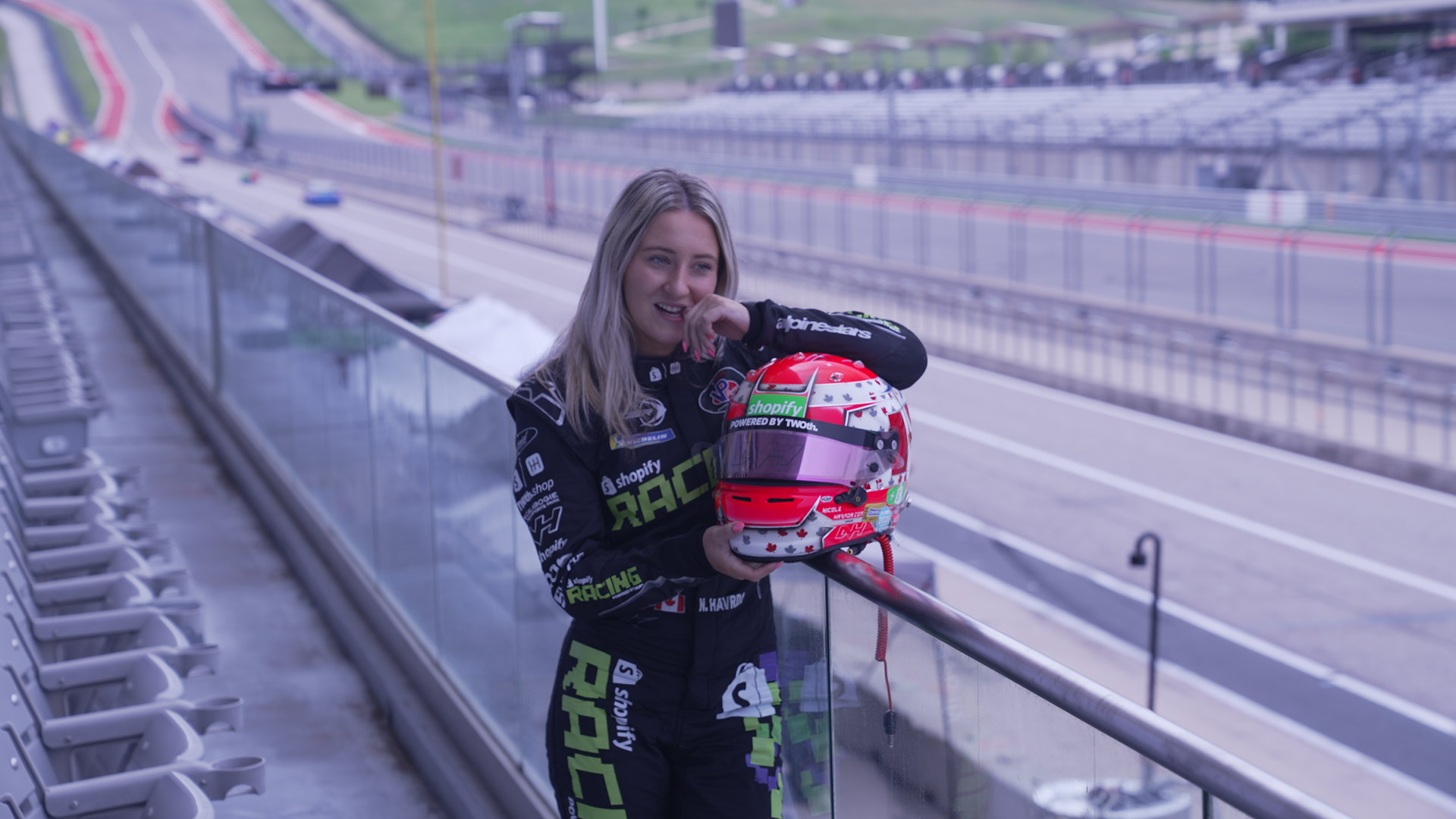
- Havrda at Circuit of the Americas in 2026
- Nationality: (Canada) Canadian (Czech Republic) Czech
- Born: 24 January 2006 (age 20) Courtenay, British Columbia, Canada

F1 Academy
- Categorisation: FIA Silver
- Years active: 2025
- Teams: Hitech TGR
- Car number: 2
- Starts: 14
- Wins: 0
- Podiums: 0
- Poles: 0
- Fastest laps: 0
- Best finish: 20th in 2025

Previous series
- 2023-2025; 2025: Formula Regional Americas Championship; Formula 4 CEZ Championship

Championship titles
- 2023 2023: Formula Pro USA Winter Series; Formula Pro USA Western Championship

Nicole Havrda (born 24 January 2006) is a Canadian and Czech racing driver who competes in IMSA VP Racing SportsCar Challenge for TWOth Autosport with support from Shopify.

== Career ==
=== Early career ===
Havrda started karting in 2020, gaining multiple podiums at the West Coast Kart Club, Rotax Max West Karting Championship, and the Western Canadian Karting Final.

In 2022, Havrda was the youngest driver in both the W Series shootout and the Heart of Racing shootout. She was also the youngest driver in the Indian Racing League.

In 2023, Havrda won both the Formula Pro USA Winter Series and the Western Championship. She continued in the Indian Racing League with Chennai Turbo Riders.

=== Formula Regional Americas ===
Havrda contested two rounds of the Formula Regional Americas Championship in 2023. She stepped up to the Formula Regional Americas Championship full time for the 2024 season, where she achieved four podium finishes, and finished the season in sixth place. She was awarded the PMH Powering Diversity Scholarship, and continued in the series for 2025.

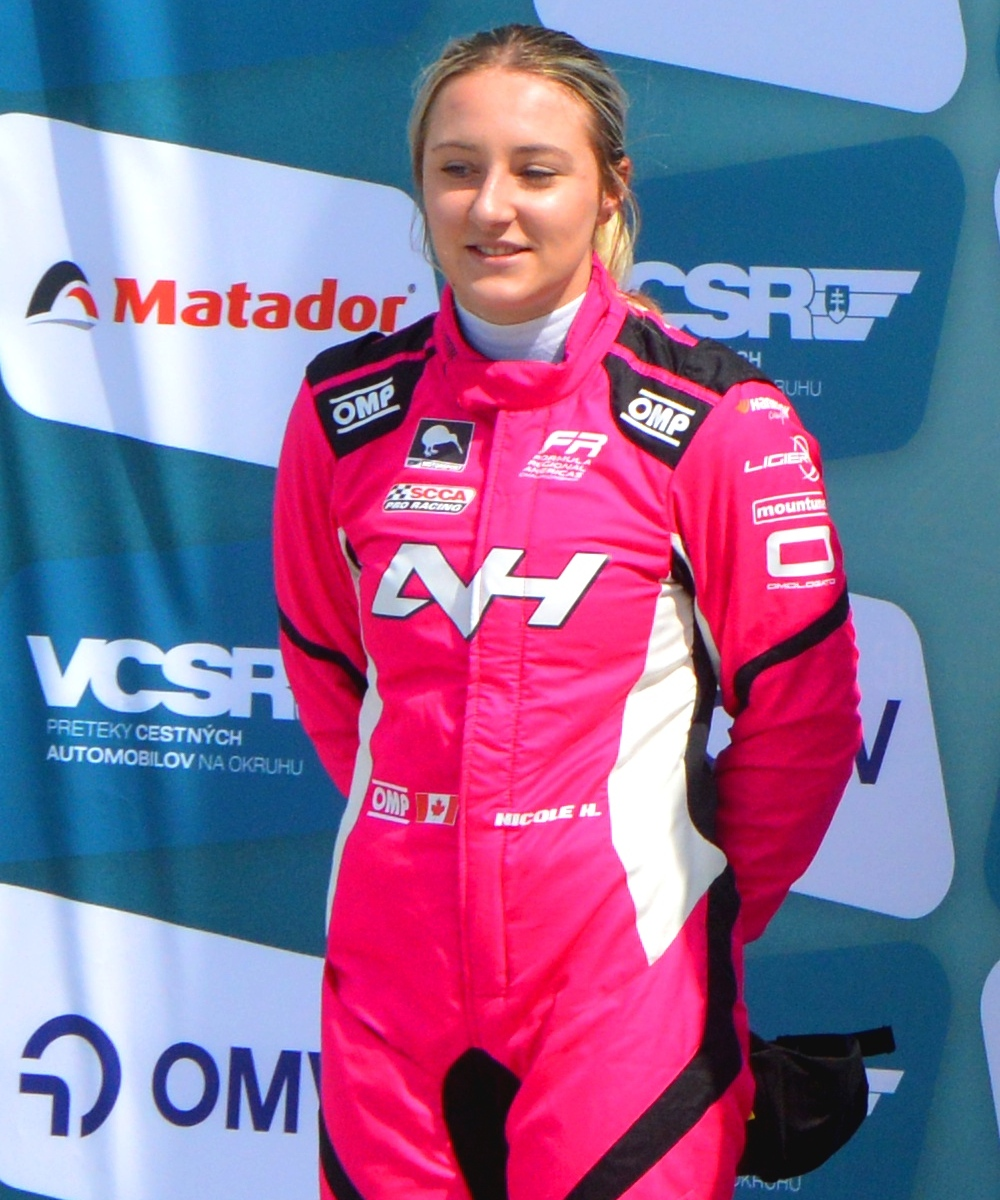
Havrda at the Slovakiaring in 2025

=== F1 Academy ===
Havrda drove for Hitech TGR in the 2025 F1 Academy season, with backing by American Express. In the first race weekend, Havrda was forced to retire from both races. She was hit from behind in race 1 by Chloe Chong, and in race 2, she was hit by Aurelia Nobels while both were trying to avoid the car of Joanne Ciconte.

=== F4 CEZ Championship ===
Havrda competed in the last two rounds of the 2025 Formula 4 CEZ Championship, at Slovakiaring and Brno for JMT Racing.

== Racing record ==
=== Racing career summary ===
Season	Series	Team	Races	Wins	Poles	F/Laps	Podiums	Points	Position
2022	Indian Racing League	Chennai Turbo Riders	6	0	0	0	0	65	11th
2022	Formula Pro USA Western Championship - FPUSA-3	Valley Kitchens Race Team	2	0	0	0	0	22	7th
2023	Formula Pro USA Winter Series - FPUSA-3	Valley Kitchens Racing	4	2	3	2	4	90	**1st**
2023	SCCA Majors Championship Western Conference - Formula Atlantic		2	2	1	0	2	50	5th
2023	Formula Pro USA Western Championship - FPUSA-3	Valley Kitchens	9	7	6	5	9	215	**1st**
2023	Indian Racing League	Chennai Turbo Riders	2	0	0	0	0	7‡	12th‡
2023	Formula Regional Americas Championship	Crosslink Kiwi Motorsport	6	0	0	0	0	38	12th
2024	Formula Regional Americas Championship	Crosslink Kiwi Motorsport	19	0	0	0	4	139.5	6th
2025	F1 Academy	Hitech TGR	14	0	0	0	0	1	20th
2025	Formula Regional Americas Championship	Kiwi Motorsports	3	0	0	0	0	0	23rd
2025	Formula 4 CEZ Championship	JMT Racing	6	0	0	0	0	4	20th
2026	HSR IMSA Classic Prototype Challenge - P3S	Shopify Racing	2	1	0	1	1	0	NC†
2026	IMSA VP Racing SportsCar Challenge - LMP3	Shopify Racing powered by TWOth	3	0	0	0	0	760	20th

‡ Team Standings
* Season still in progress.

=== Complete Formula Regional Americas Championship results ===
(key) (Races in bold indicate pole position) (Races in italics indicate fastest lap)

Year	Team	1	2	3	4	5	6	7	8	9	10	11	12	13	14	15	16	17	18	19	20	21	22	DC	Points
2023	Crosslink Kiwi Motorsport	NOL; 1	NOL; 2	NOL; 3	ROA; 1	ROA; 2	ROA; 3	MOH; 1	MOH; 2	MOH; 3	NJM; 1; 5	NJM; 2 Ret	NJM; 3; 5	VIR; 1; 6	VIR; 2 Ret	VIR; 3; 5	COA; 1	COA; 2	COA; 3					12th	38
2024	Crosslink Kiwi Motorsport	NOL; 1; 7	NOL; 2; 6	NOL; 3; 12†	ROA; 1; 5	ROA; 2; 3	ROA; 3; 3	IMS; 1; 8	IMS; 2; 3	IMS; 3; 4	MOH; 1; 6	MOH; 2; 6	NJM; 1 Ret	NJM; 2; 7	NJM; 3; 8	MOS; 1; 7	MOS; 2; 5	MOS; 3; 6	COT; 1; 7	COT; 2; 3				6th	139.5
2025	Kiwi Motorsports	NOL; 1; 12	NOL; 2; 13	NOL; 3; 12	ROA; 1	ROA; 2	ROA; 3	IMS; 1	IMS; 2	IMS; 3	MOH; 1	MOH; 2	MOH; 3	NJM; 1	NJM; 2	NJM; 3	MOS; 1	MOS; 2	MOS; 3	VIR; 1	VIR; 2	ALA; 2	ALA; 2	23rd	0

=== Complete F1 Academy results ===
(key) (Races in bold indicate pole position; races in italics indicate fastest lap)

Year	Entrant	1	2	3	4	5	6	7	8	9	10	11	12	13	14	15	DC	Points
2025	Hitech TGR	SHA; 1 Ret	SHA; 2 Ret	JED; 1; 15	JED; 2; 16	MIA; 1; 12	MIA; 2 C	MTL; 1; 10	MTL; 2 Ret	MTL; 3; 11	ZAN; 1; 10	ZAN; 2; 16	SIN; 1 Ret	SIN; 2 Ret	LVG; 1; 12	LVG; 2; 16	20th	1

=== Complete Formula 4 CEZ Championship results ===
(key) (Races in bold indicate pole position; races in italics indicate fastest lap)

Year	Team	1	2	3	4	5	6	7	8	9	10	11	12	13	14	15	16	17	18	DC	Points
2025	JMT Racing	RBR1; 1	RBR1; 2	RBR1; 3	RBR2; 1	RBR2; 2	RBR2; 3	SAL; 1	SAL; 2	SAL; 3	MOS; 1	MOS; 2	MOS; 3	SVK; 1; 10	SVK; 2; 13	SVK; 3; 9	BRN; 1; 13	BRN; 2; 10	BRN; 3; 13	20th	4

=== Complete IMSA VP Racing SportsCar Challenge results ===
(key) (Races in bold indicate pole position; races in italics indicate fastest lap)

Year	Entrant	Class	Make	Engine	1	2	3	4	5	6	7	8	9	10	11	12	13	14	Rank	Points
2026	TWOth Autosport	LMP3	Ligier JS P325	Toyota V35A-FTS 3.5 L Turbo V6	DAY; 1	DAY; 2	AUS1; 1	AUS1; 2	SEB; 5	AUS2; 7	MOH; 1	MOH; 2	VIR; 1; 5	MOS; 1	MOS; 2	ELK	ATL; 1	ATL; 2	20th	760
