= Buttonwillow Raceway Park =

Motorsport venue in California. United States

- Track map of Buttonwillow Raceway Park (1995–present)
- Location: 24551 Lerdo Highway; Buttonwillow, California 93206
- Coordinates: 35°29′28.7″N 119°32′41.8″W
- Owner: Cal Club Enterprises, Inc.
- Operator: California Sports Car Club
- Opened: 1995
- Major events: Future: Trans-Am West Coast Series (2025, 2027); Former: MazdaSpeed Miata Cup (2003)

Race #13 CW (1995–present)
- Surface: Asphalt
- Length: 3.000 mi (4.828 km)
- Turns: 23

Race #14 CW (1995–present)
- Surface: Asphalt
- Length: 2.640 mi (4.249 km)
- Turns: 21

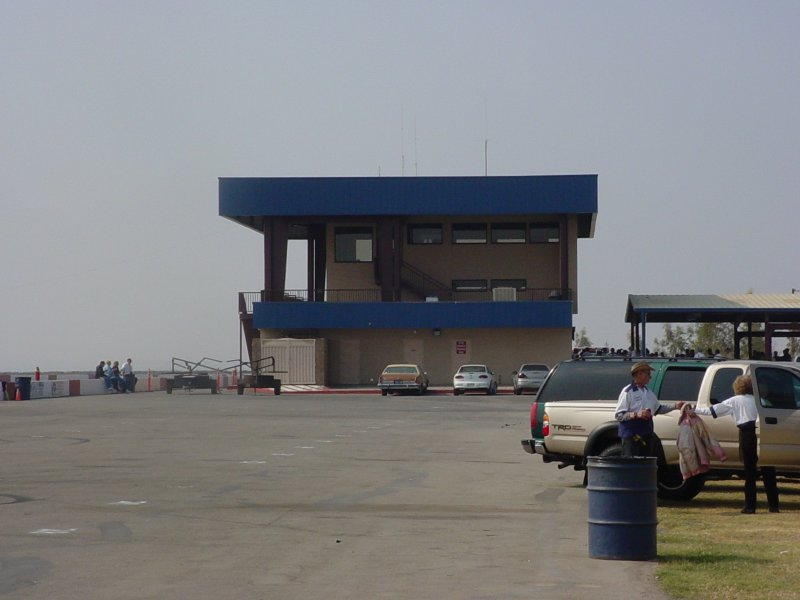
Race control tower

Buttonwillow Raceway Park is a motorsports park in Kern County, California, 10-mile (16 km) north of the town of Buttonwillow and 28-mile (45 km) northwest of Bakersfield. Opened in 1995, it is owned and operated by the California Sports Car Club, a region of SCCA, Buttonwillow is the "flagship" track of Cal Club, and is also the location of the club's administrative offices.

The track offers multiple configurations, with the configuration "Race #13 CW" being the most popular. Many time attack series, most notably Super Lap Battle, hold their events with the 13CW configuration.

The Super Lap Battle is a time attack event held at Buttonwillow since 2004.

The track was repaved in July 2014.

A new, technical circuit is scheduled to finish construction in 2023. The addition will include a new tower building, Tesla Supercharger stations, and new garages. The new track will be named as "The Circuit", with the original track being renamed as "The Classic".

== See also ==
- Chuckwalla Valley Raceway
- Willow Springs International Motorsports Park
- Thunderhill Raceway Park
