= Thunderhill Raceway Park =

Motorsports complex in Sacramento Valley, California, U.S.

- Thunderhill East Circuit (1997–present)

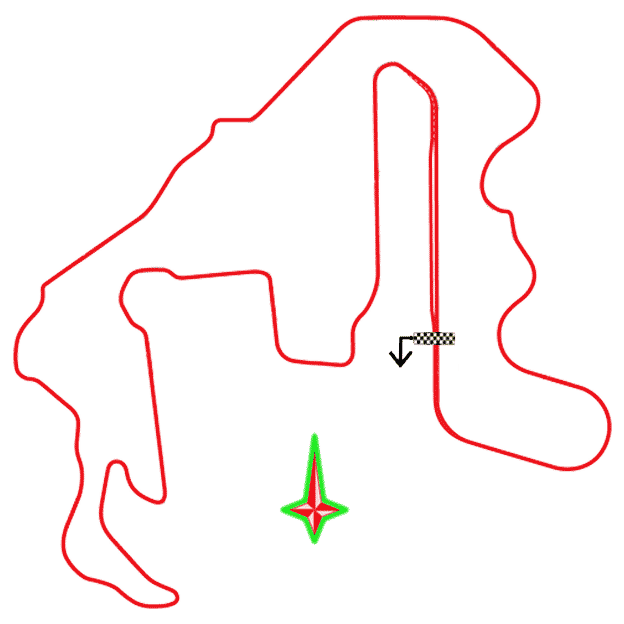
- Thunderhill Five Mile Circuit (2014–present)
- Location: Glenn County, Willows, California
- Coordinates: 39°32′25.2″N 122°19′50.5″W
- Owner: San Francisco Region Sports Car Club of America
- Operator: San Francisco Region Properties, Inc.
- Broke ground: January 1993; 33 years ago
- Opened: October 1993; 33 years ago
- Major events: Future: Trans-Am West Coast Series (2019–2025, 2027); Former: 25 Hours of Thunderhill (1998–2023)

Thunderhill East Circuit (1997–present)
- Surface: Asphalt
- Length: 2.866 mi (4.612 km)
- Turns: 16

Thunderhill West Circuit (2014–present)
- Surface: Asphalt
- Length: 2.000 mi (3.219 km)
- Turns: 10

Thunderhill Five Mile Circuit (2014–present)
- Surface: Asphalt
- Length: 4.600 mi (7.403 km)
- Turns: 26

Thunderhill East Circuit (1993–1997)
- Surface: Asphalt
- Length: 1.814 mi (2.919 km)
- Turns: 9

In summer 2026, Thunderhill Raceway Park completed a major resurfacing of its East Course, working with Apex Circuit Design, WSP, the National Center for Asphalt Technology (NCAT) and George Reed. The project followed approximately 18 months of planning and included a new multi-layer asphalt system, ground stabilisation, drainage improvements and 770 precast curb sections. The works sought to preserve the circuit's existing character while improving durability, safety and racing performance.

Thunderhill Raceway Park is a motorsports complex located 7 mi (11 km) west of Willows, California, United States, in the Sacramento Valley. It is the venue for the longest automobile race in the United States, the annual 25 Hours of Thunderhill.

Thunderhill has two tracks: the original 2.866 mi (4.612 km) track known as Thunderhill East and a 2.000 mi (3.219 km) track known as Thunderhill West. The two tracks can also be combined to offer a 4.600 mi (7.403 km) track. Thunderhill also offers two large skid pad areas as well for drifting and car control events.

The venue is available for a wide variety of events or functions. It can be rented for racing events, lapping day events, drifting events, go kart events, driving schools, ride and drive programs, corporate events, commercials, a movie location, trade shows, weddings, receptions, swap meets etc.

San Francisco Region Properties, Inc., doing business as Thunderhill Raceway Park, is a wholly owned subsidiary of the San Francisco Region Sports Car Club of America. Thunderhill Raceway has its own board of directors and operates nearly independently, sharing only a few employees with its parent organization for administrative purposes.

== History ==
Thunderhill Raceway Park was built in 1993 originally as a 1.814 mi (2.919 km), 9-turn track. Following the closure of the Baylands Raceway in Fremont, CA, the purchase of the land and construction of Thunderhill was funded by the San Francisco Region Sports Car Club of America.

In late 1997, the track was expanded to its present-day 2.866 mi (4.612 km) configuration, adding six new turns, a bypass for the "cyclone" corner, and additional paved paddock space.

Thunderhill West was conceptualized in 2013 and built in 2014 as a standalone track. Connectors were made to connect the original track with the new west track to make a five-mile-long track. At the time of construction, this was the longest racetrack in California, and it gained the nickname "Thunderschleife" as a nod to the Nurburgring Nordschleife.
