= Hotel Oakland =

- U.S. National Register of Historic Places
- Oakland Designated Landmark
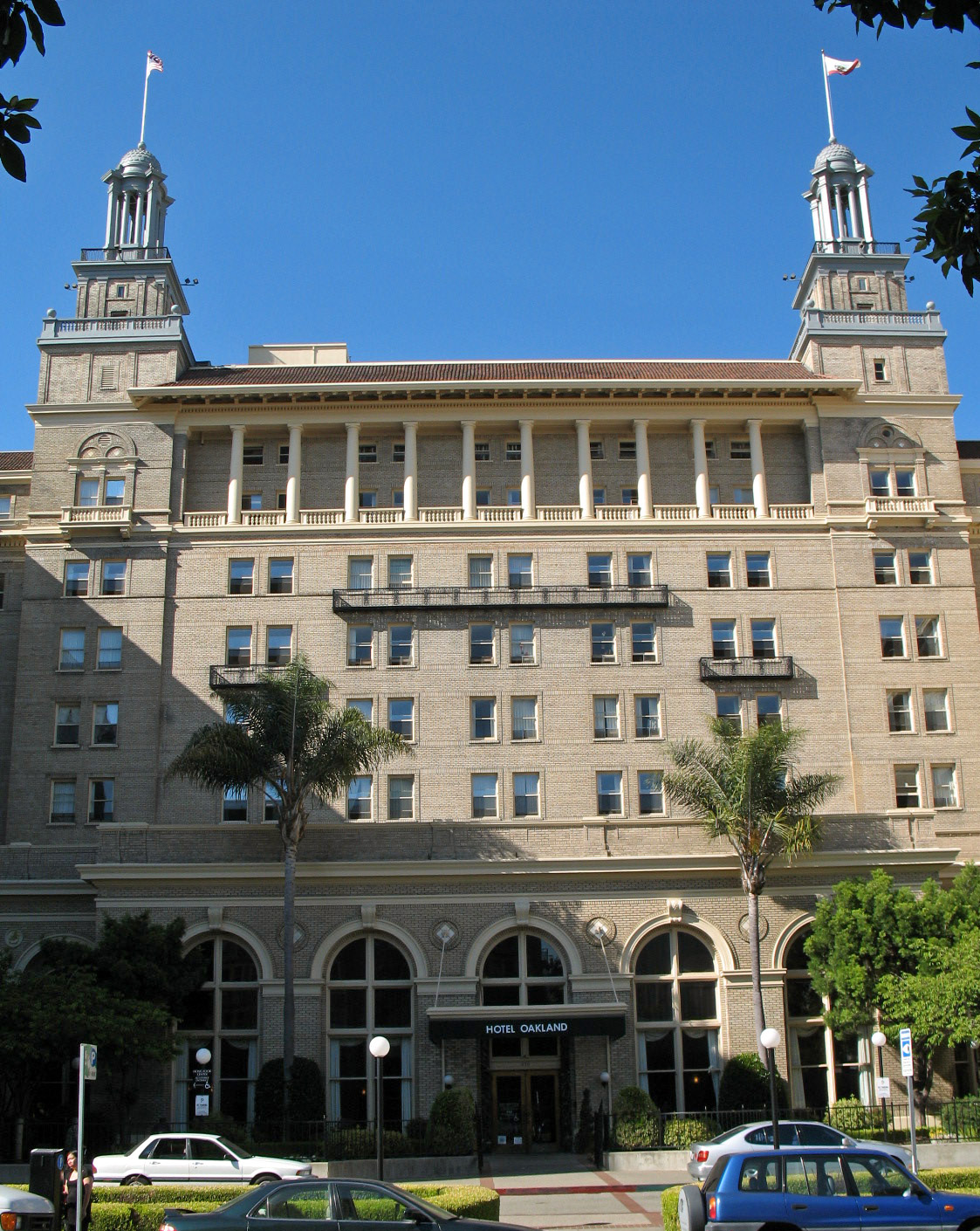

- Location within California
- Location: 260 13th Street, Oakland, California
- Coordinates: 37°48′09″N 122°15′58″W
- Area: 1.4 acres (0.57 ha)
- Built: 1912
- Built by: P.J. Walker
- Architects: Walter Danforth Bliss and William Baker Faville
- NRHP reference No.: 79000470
- ODL No.: 31

Significant dates
- Added to NRHP: September 4, 1979
- Designated ODL: 1979

The Hotel Oakland is a historic Renaissance Revival style building in Oakland, California. It was built as a luxury hotel in 1912. From 1943 to 1963, it was a hospital for the United States Army and the United States Department of Veterans Affairs. It was subsequently unoccupied until 1981, when it reopened as Hotel Oakland Village, a retirement home. It has been listed on the National Register of Historic Places since September 4, 1979.

== History ==
The proposal for the Hotel Oakland dates to 1906, prompted by the San Francisco earthquake and fire, which redirected much of the city's commerce to Oakland. This shift presented an opportunity for Oakland's business community, which aimed to position the city as a strong competitor to San Francisco. A grand hotel was deemed crucial for this goal, in order to host visitors and conventions.

The Oakland Hotel Company was established in September 1906, with initial funding through $750,000 in stock and bonds, later increased to $3,000,000. Major investors included business figures like F.M. "Borax" Smith, Edson Adams, and W.W. Garthwaite, the latter becoming the hotel's company president. Retail investors included prominent local businesses such as H.C. Capwell Co., Kahn Brothers, Taft and Pennoyer, and Charlie Jurgens.

Henry Janeway Hardenbergh, famed for designing New York's Plaza, was first chosen as the architect, but financial setbacks and Hardenburgh's travel difficulties led him to step down. The hotel was designed by Bliss and Faville, a renowned San Francisco firm known for prominent buildings like the St. Francis Hotel and the Bank of California. The building's U-shaped design allows all rooms to have street views and natural light. Purdy and Henderson of Seattle served as consulting engineers. Walter Bliss also designed the hotel's interior furnishings. The construction contract was awarded in August 1910 to the firm of P.J. Walker.

The hotel opened on December 23, 1912, with a grand dinner and ball attended by 1,150 guests, including local dignitaries and social elites. The evening featured a special menu and the "Hotel Oakland March" composed by orchestra director Gustave Schultheis.

Despite financial challenges that delayed the completion of the upper floors, the hotel became a prominent social hub in the East Bay, hosting significant events like a 1919 ball attended by 4,000 people and conventions such as the California Republican Assembly and the American Legion. Notable guests included Presidents Wilson, Coolidge, and Hoover, Charles Lindbergh, Amelia Earhart, Sarah Bernhardt, and Jean Harlow. Mary Pickford even sold Liberty Bonds at the hotel in 1918.

Management issues and the Great Depression led to multiple bankruptcies in the 1930s. The hotel was taken over by the Army during World War II, in February 1943, and converted to the Oakland Area Station Hospital, with the furnishings auctioned off. Post-war efforts to reopen the hotel were unsuccessful, and it remained the Veterans Administration Hospital until its closure in August 1963.

The building was vacant for many years, until it was bought by a Boston-based developer, who renovated it and reopened it in 1981 as Hotel Oakland Village, offering affordable housing for seniors. It underwent a seismic renovation in 1992, and as of 2021 had almost 400 senior residents.
