= Southern Pacific Building =

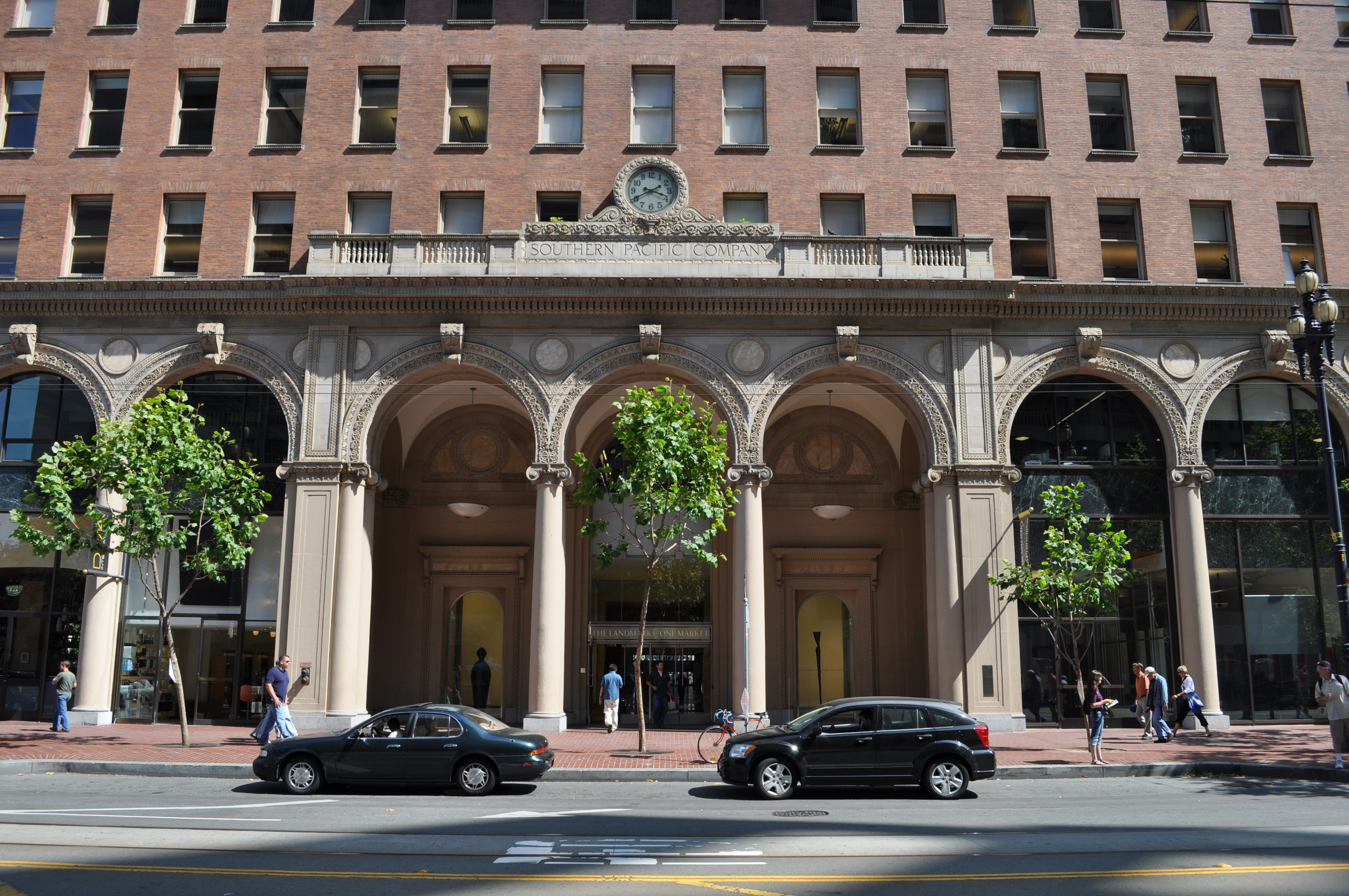
- The Market street facade of One Market Plaza

- Location within San Francisco Southern Pacific Building (California) Southern Pacific Building (the United States)

General information
- Type: Commercial offices
- Location: 1 Market Street; San Francisco, California; United States
- Coordinates: 37.79396°N 122.39496°W
- Completed: 1917
- Cost: US$1.5 million
- Owner: Morgan Stanley Real Estate; Paramount Group, Inc.

Height
- Roof: 65 m (213 ft)

Technical details
- Floor count: 12
- Floor area: 420,000 sq ft (39,000 m^{2})

Design and construction
- Architects: Walter Danforth Bliss; William Baker Faville
- Structural engineer: Tipping Mar + Associates (1999 retrofit)

The Southern Pacific Building is one of three office buildings comprising One Market Plaza along the Embarcadero in San Francisco, California. The historic E-shaped 11-story, 65-metre (213 ft) building, also known as "The Landmark", was started in 1916 and completed in 1917.

== History ==
The building served as the headquarters for the Southern Pacific Railroad after it relocated from the Flood Building in 1917, ten years after SP had moved into the Flood Building. At its completion, the building's first floor was devoted to retail except for the portion facing the rear courtyard (opening to Mission Street), which was reserved for Southern Pacific. SP rented the second floor to a tenant, but occupied floors three through ten with various offices. For many years, the building was topped with a large sign emblazoned with a gothic "S·P".

It was later incorporated into the 1976 One Market Plaza development which includes Spear Tower and Steuart Tower. By 1995, Sam Zell owned One Market Plaza. However, Union Pacific Railroad was still the owner of One Market Street until the building was sold for US$50,000,000 (equivalent to $98,764,802 in 2025) to The Martin Group (TMG) in 1998. TMG invested another $50 million to renovate the property, including a seismic retrofit, completing work in 1999. Equity Office Properties Trust sold One Market Street to The Blackstone Group in February 2007, and Blackstone, in turn, sold One Market to Morgan Stanley in June 2007 as part of a large real estate acquisition. Morgan Stanley sold approximately half of One Market Plaza to The Paramount Group in July 2007. One Market Plaza was owned jointly by Morgan Stanley (49% share) and The Paramount Group (51% share) until Morgan Stanley sold its share to Blackstone Real Estate Partners in 2014 for US$600,000,000 (equivalent to $815,996,626 in 2025).

== Design ==
When completed, One Market Street was hailed as the tallest steel-framed structure west of the Mississippi. The building is planned in the form of the capital letter "E", with the longest side, 275 ft (84 m) long, along Market Street. The wings on Spear and Steuart Streets are each 210 ft (64 m) long, and the central arm is occupied by elevators. It is designed in the Italian Renaissance style with details executed in Roman brick and terra cotta. The lobby was fitted with Colorado yule marble walls and an ornamental plaster ceiling.

During the 1998–99 refurbishment, two of the eight original passenger elevators were eliminated and custom-sized modern elevator cabs were installed in the other six shafts, running on the original guide rails. The elevators had received a major redesign in 1956, when elevator operators were eliminated by automatic operation.

== Gallery ==
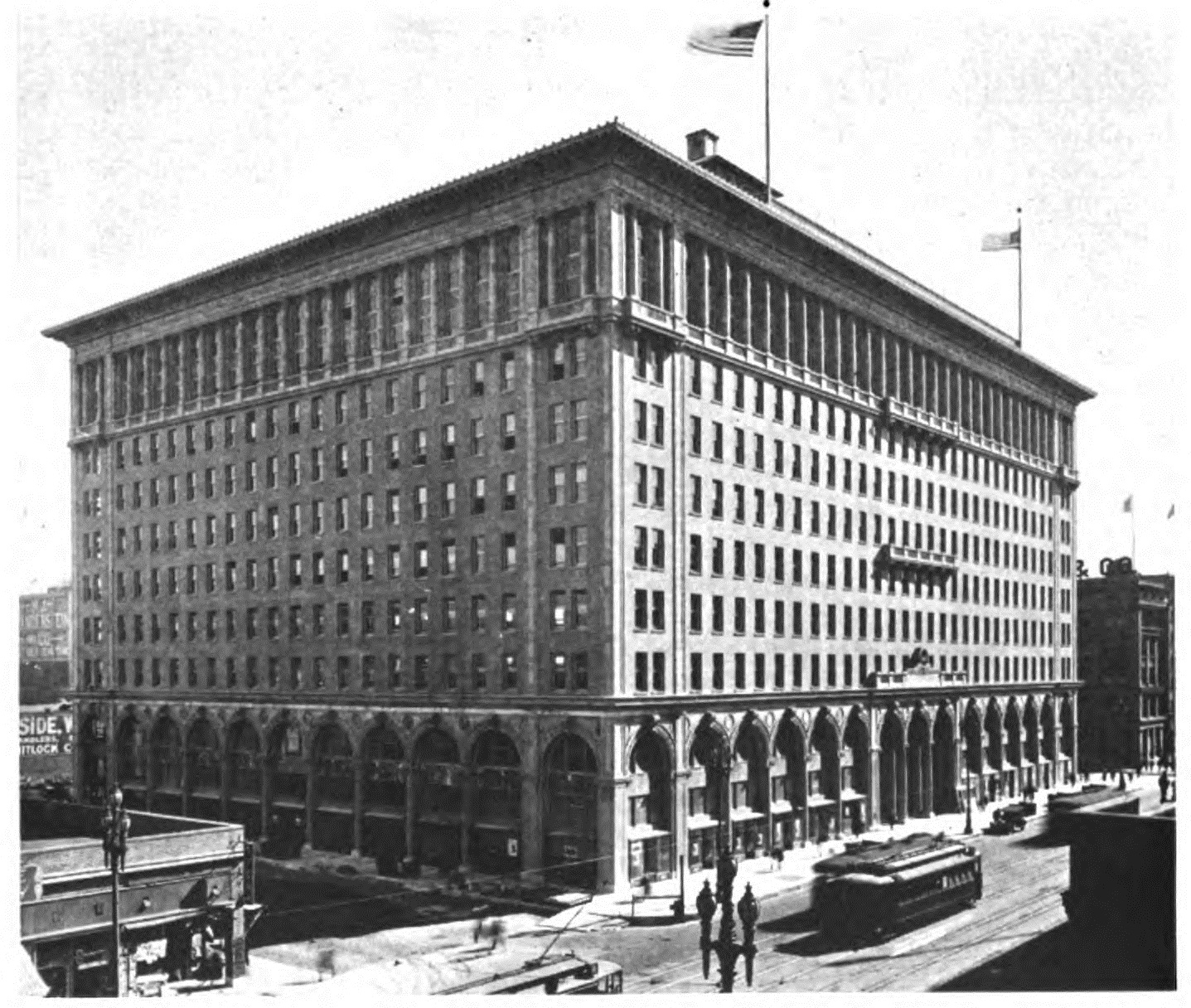
Soon after completion in 1917

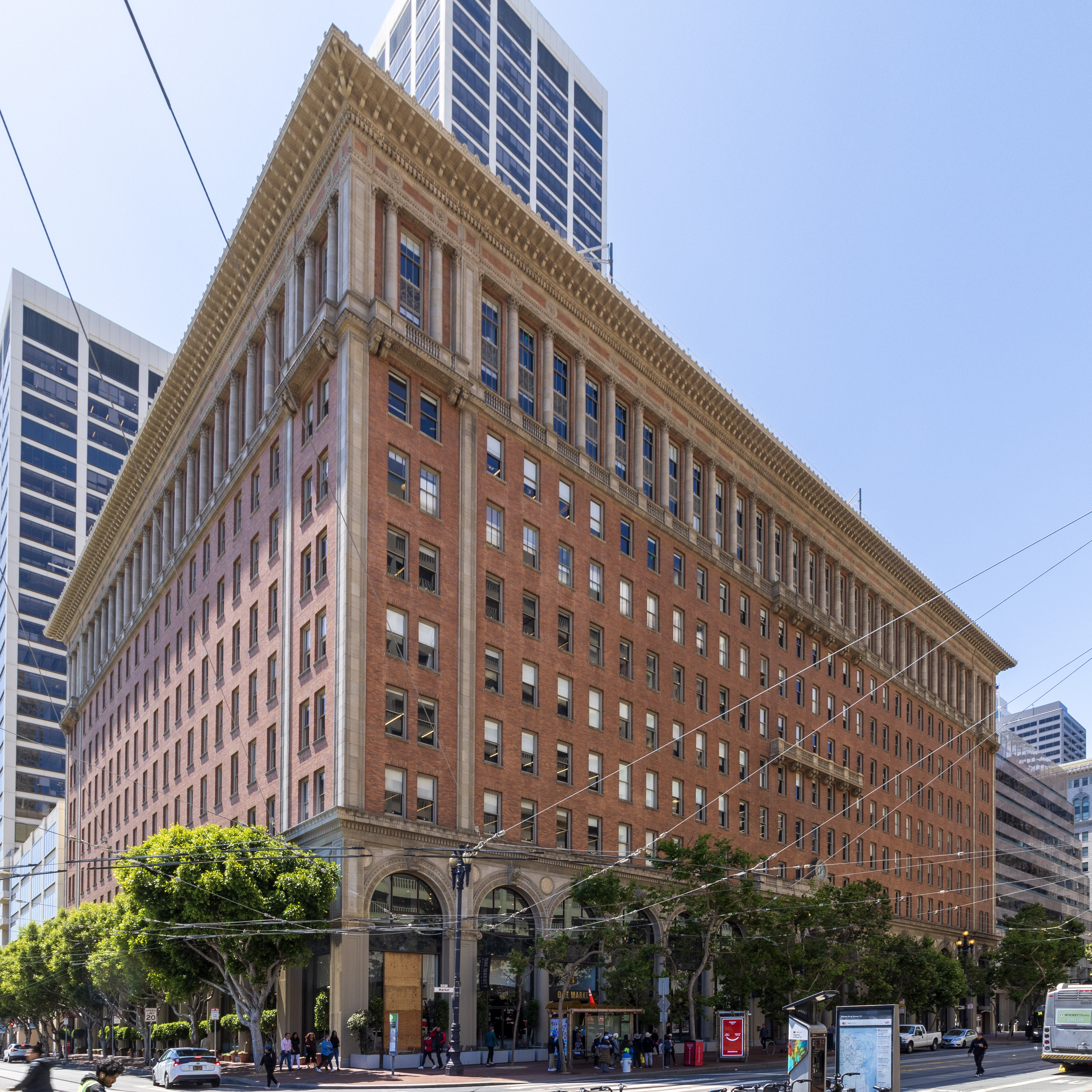
In 2023, seen from the end of Market Street

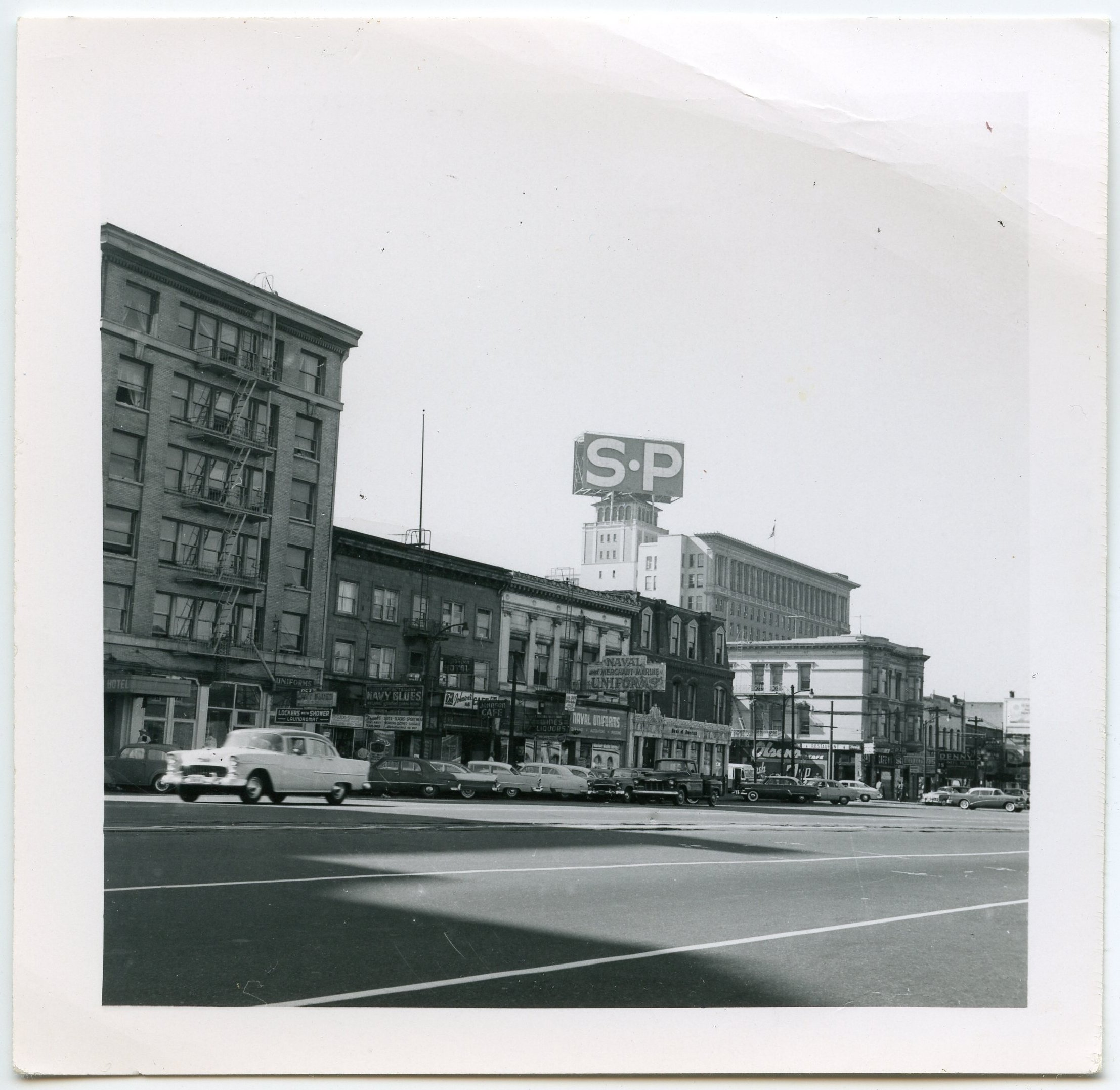
The "S·P" sign from The Embarcadero (1956)

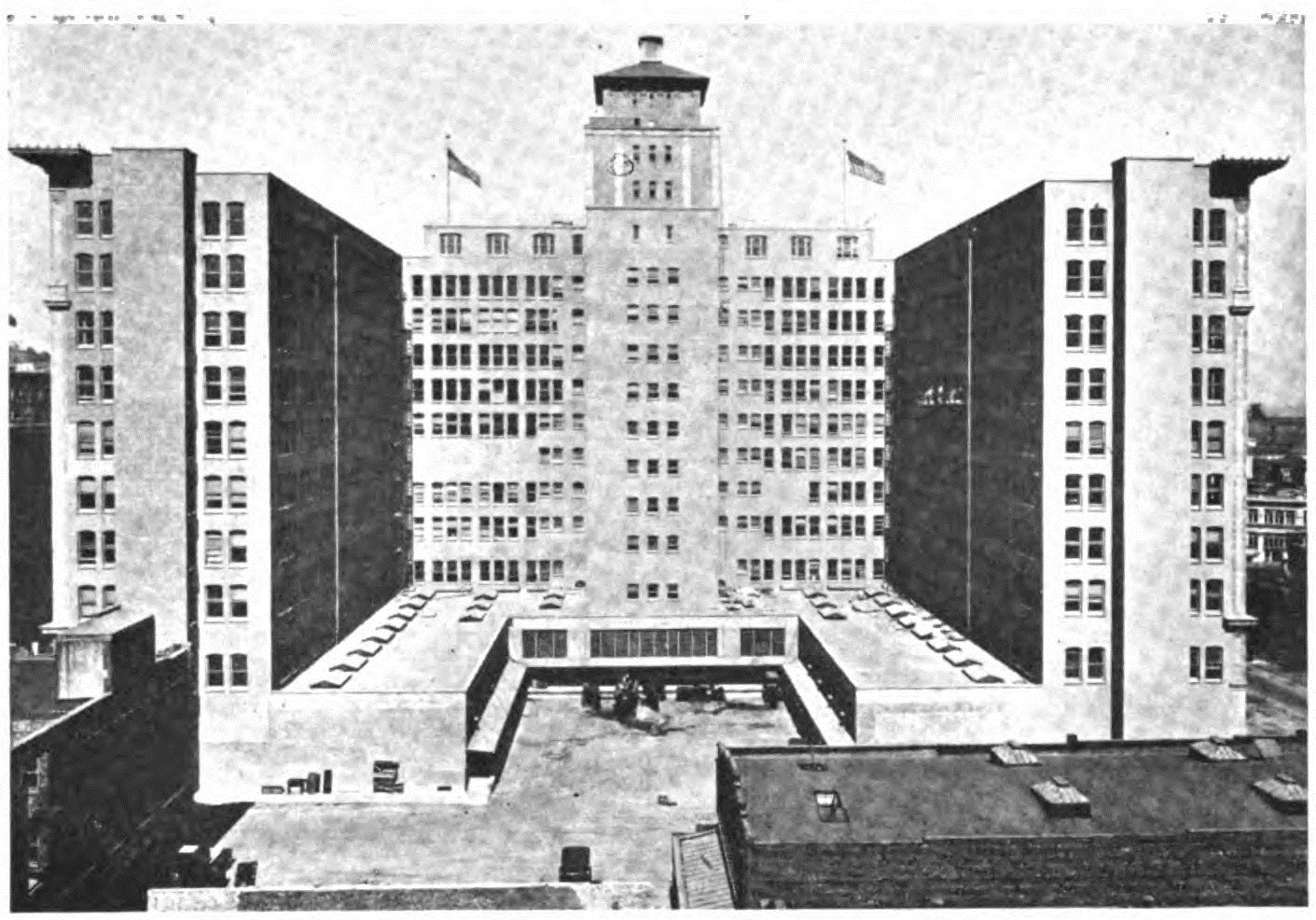
Rear courtyard opening on Mission (1917)

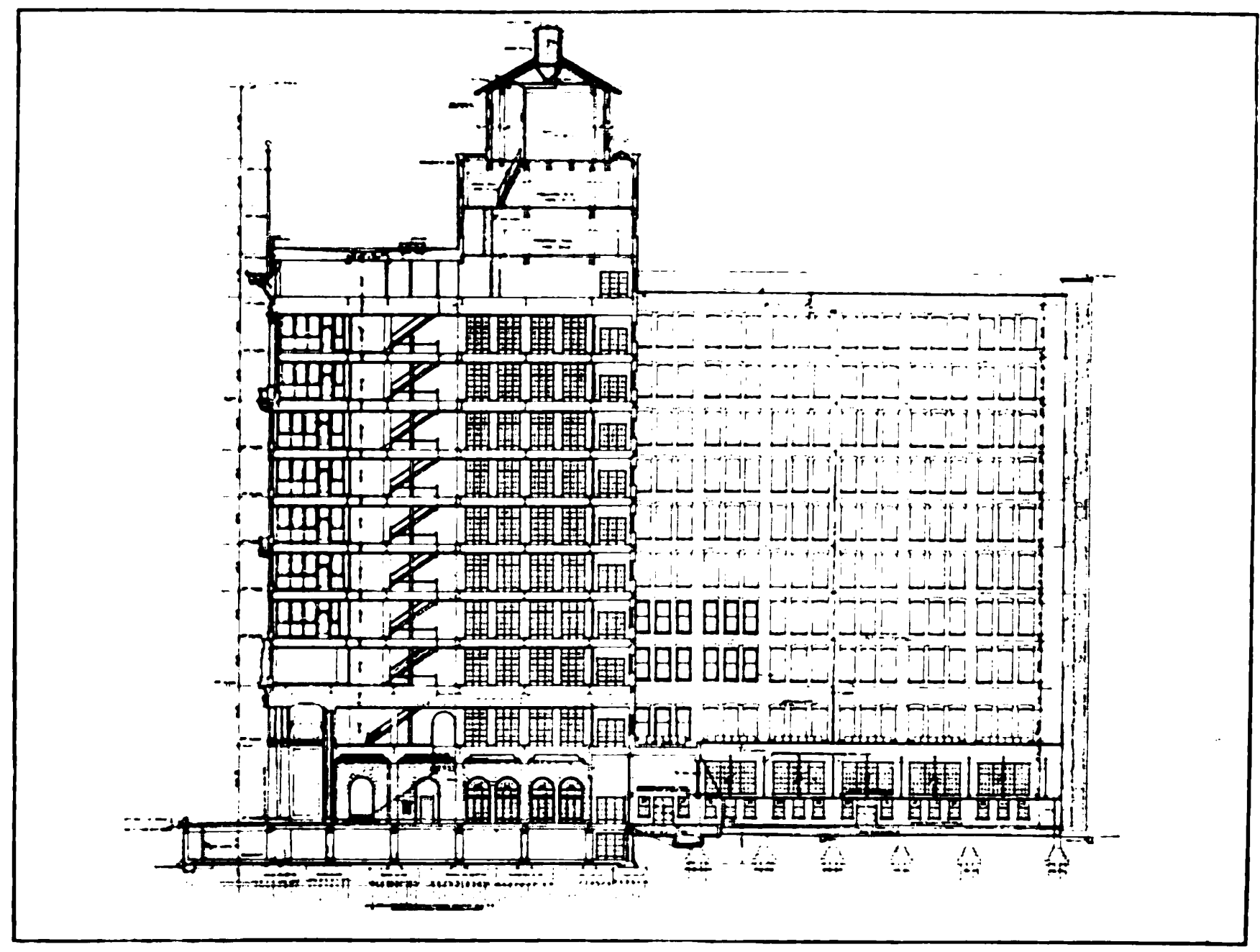
Cross-section drawing (parallel to Spear/Steuart)

== Former Tenants ==
- Southern Pacific
- Del Monte Foods
- Salesforce.com

== Current Tenants ==
- Autodesk
- Google

== See also ==
- San Francisco's tallest buildings
