= American Conservatory Theater =

Theater company and historic place in San Francisco, California

American Conservatory Theater (A.C.T.)
- Formation: 1965
- Type: Theatre group
- Location: San Francisco, California
- Artistic director: Pam MacKinnon
- Website: www.act-sf.org

- Geary Theater
- U.S. National Register of Historic Places
- San Francisco Designated Landmark
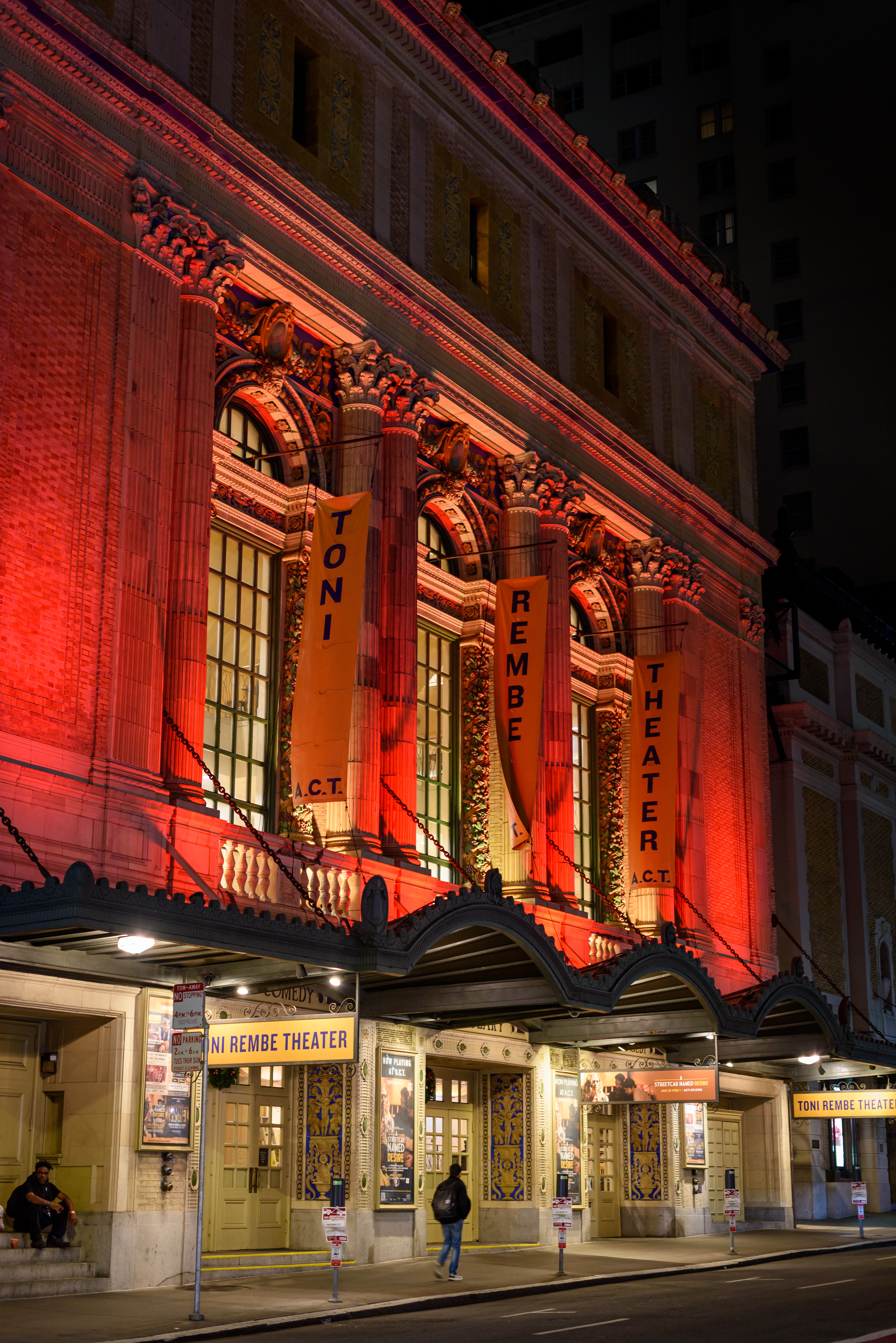
- (2025)

- Location within San Francisco County
- Location: 415 Geary Street; San Francisco, California
- Coordinates: 37°47′13″N 122°24′37″W
- Built: 1910
- Architects: Walter D. Bliss & William B. Faville
- Architectural style: Classical Revival; Late Victorian
- NRHP reference No.: 75000472
- SFDL No.: 82

Significant dates
- Added to NRHP: May 27, 1975
- Designated SFDL: July 11, 1976

The American Conservatory Theater (ACT) is a nonprofit theater company in San Francisco, California, United States, that offers both classical and contemporary theater productions. It has an attached acting school.

== History ==
The American Conservatory Theater was founded in 1965 in Pittsburgh, Pennsylvania, by theatre and opera director William Ball in conjunction with the Pittsburgh Playhouse and Carnegie Mellon University. In San Francisco, Ball presented twenty-seven fully staged productions in rotating repertory, in two different theaters – the Geary Theater and the Marines Memorial Theatre – during the first 40-week season.

A.C.T.'s original twenty-seven member acting company featured René Auberjonois, Peter Donat, Richard Dysart, Michael Learned, Ruth Kobart, Paul Shenar, Charles Siebert, Ken Ruta, Ray Reinhardt, and Kitty Winn among others. Ball's mid-1970s productions of Shakespeare's Taming of the Shrew, starring Marc Singer, and Rostand's Cyrano de Bergerac, starring Peter Donat and Marsha Mason, were televised by PBS.

In the mid-1980s, Ball, suffering from exhaustion and under accusations of financial mismanagement, was forced to relinquish his post as artistic director. He was succeeded by A.C.T. founding member and stage director Edward Hastings, who revived the company's fortunes until the Geary Theater was severely damaged by the 1989 Loma Prieta earthquake. The company continued performing in a number of San Francisco venues.

Carey Perloff served as A.C.T.'s artistic director from 1992 to 2018. In 2007, A.C.T. released a cast album of Perloff's production of the Bertolt Brecht and Kurt Weill musical Happy End, produced by LucasArts studios. It includes the full score and is the first English-language recording of this musical. Pam MacKinnon was appointed to succeed Perloff as artistic director, effective with the end of the 2017–2018 season.

== Theaters ==
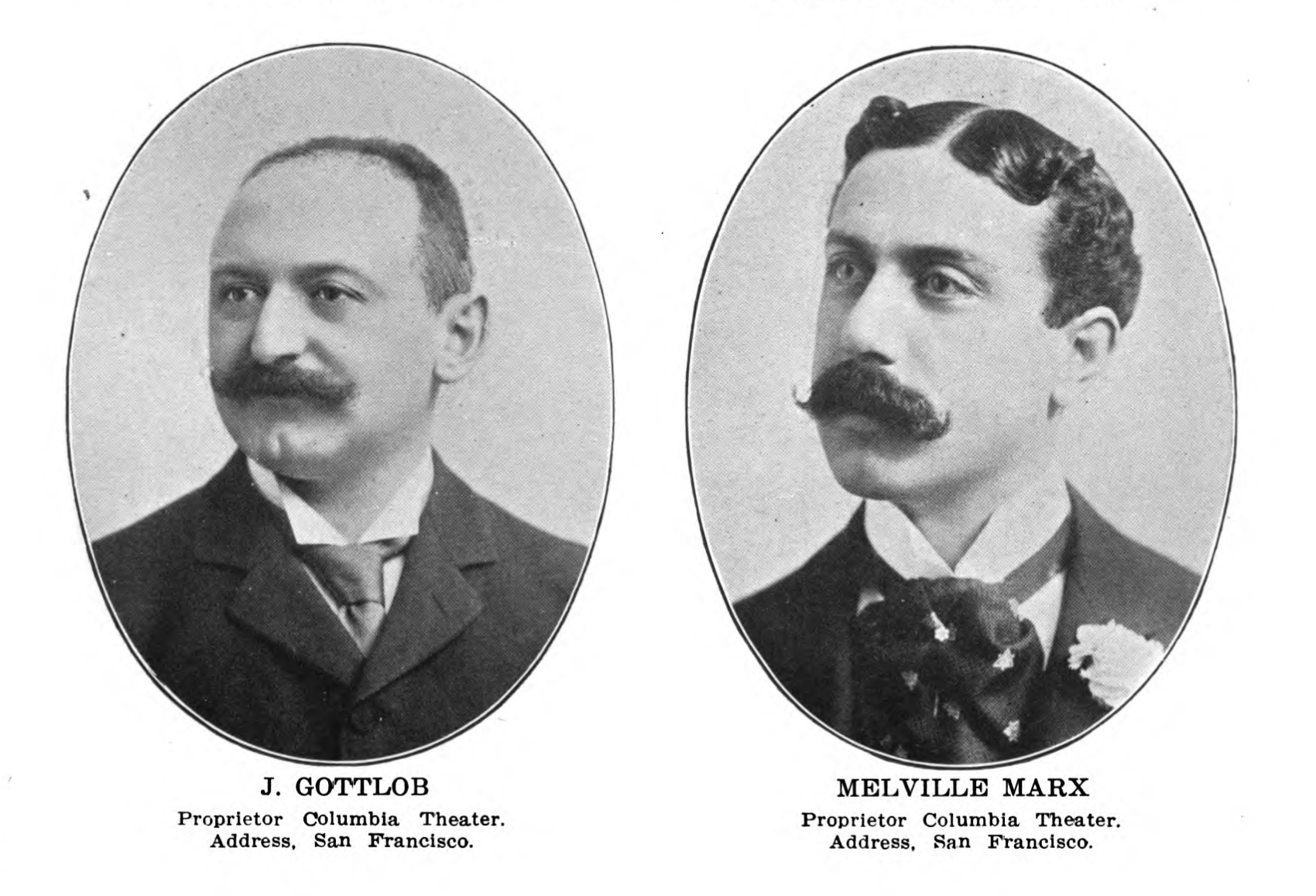
J. Gottlob and Melville Marx, proprietors of the former Columbia Theater

A.C.T.'s primary home in San Francisco is the Toni Rembe Theater (formerly the Geary Theater, located at 415 Geary Street near the corner of Mason Street in the Theatre District of San Francisco. Built in 1910 and designed by Walter D. Bliss and William B. Faville in the Classical Revival and Late Victorian styles, it was previously known as the Columbia Theater. It was listed on the National Register of Historic Places on May 27, 1975, under the name "Geary Theater", and was designated an official San Francisco Designated Landmark on July 11, 1976, under the name "Geary Theater". The name was changed to the Toni Rembe Theater in 2022 after a $35 million donation was made by an anonymous donor. Toni Rembe is member of the board and past chair of the board of the A.C.T.

In 2015, A.C.T. opened the Strand Theater at 1127 Market Street between 7th and 8th Streets, across from the U.N. Plaza in the Civic Center neighborhood of San Francisco. It originally opened in 1917 as a venue for silent films. It was later used as an adult movie theater and was shut down in 2003. It was purchased by the A.C.T. in 2012 and renovated by Skidmore, Owings & Merrill LLP. The building has a 283-seat theater as well as a 120-seat event and performance space. A.C.T. uses the theater to present educational workshops, cabaret performances and specially commissioned new works, as well as productions connected to their Conservatory programs.

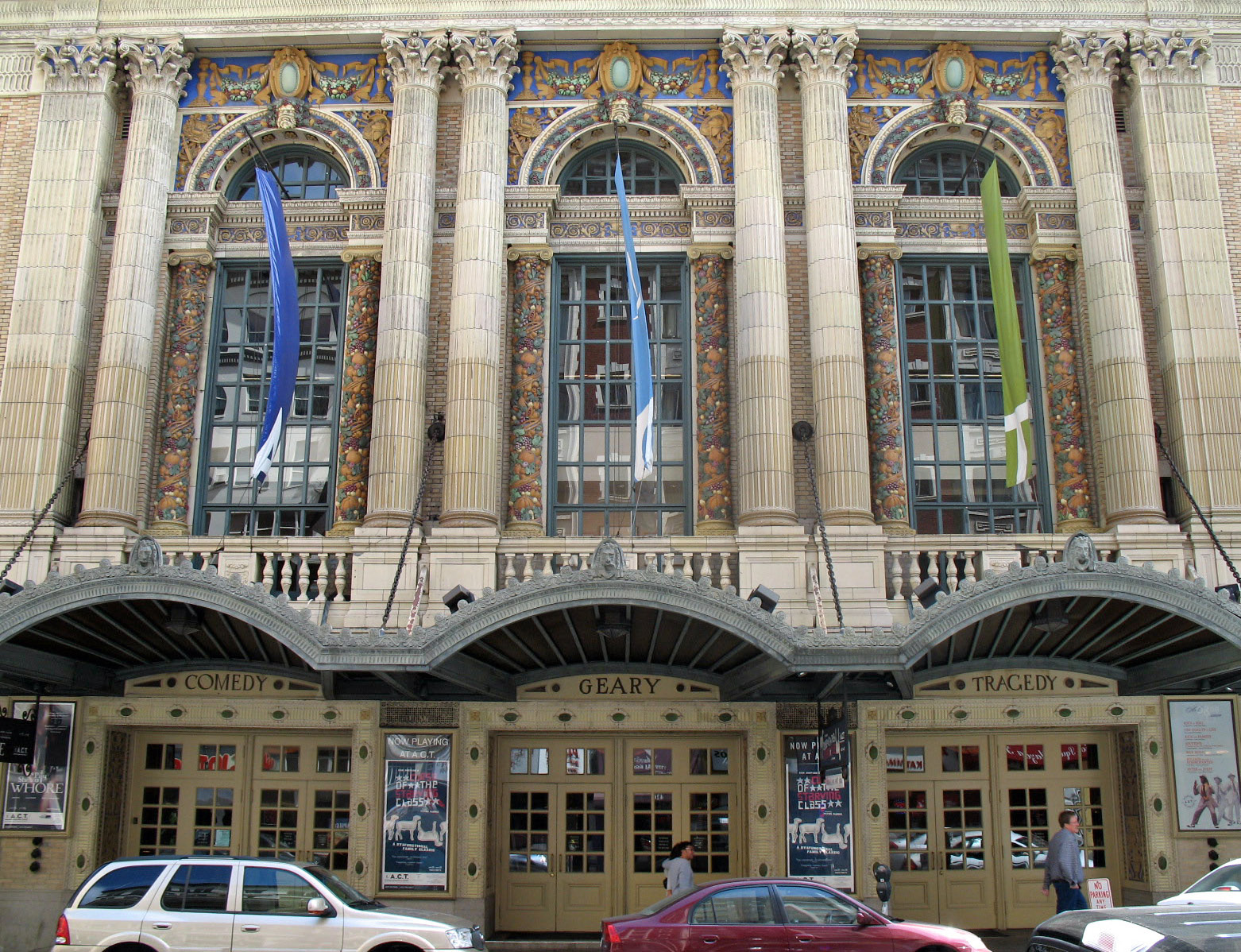
Close-up of The Toni Rembe Theatre (formerly Geary Theater) facade

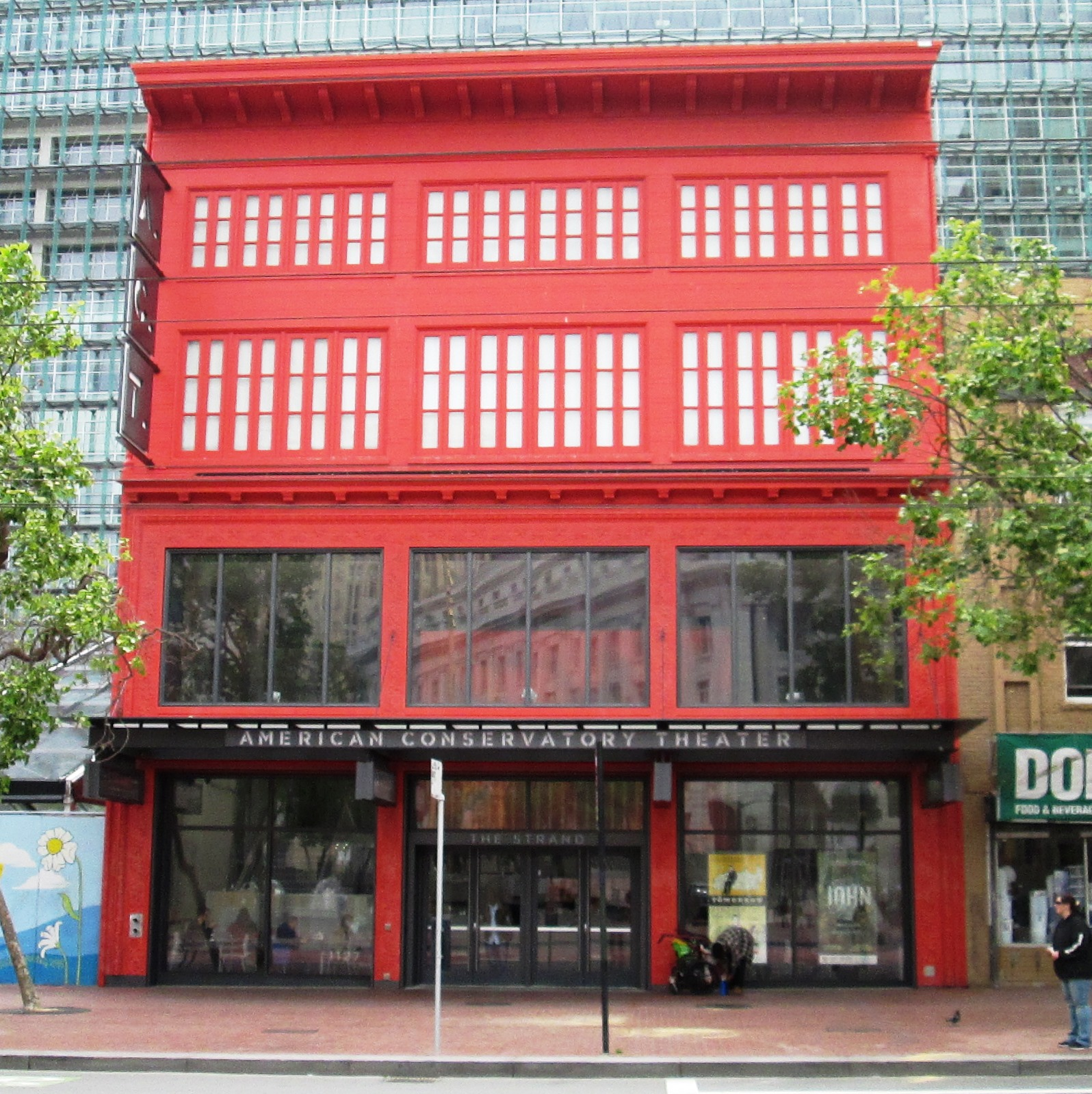
The Strand Theater, at 1127 Market Street, was opened in 2015 as A.C.T.'s second space (2017)

== Conservatory ==
A.C.T.'s Conservatory has been a core part of the organization since its earliest years and remains a major center for theater training in the San Francisco Bay Area. Current offerings include Studio A.C.T., which provides year-round part-time classes for adults; the Young Conservatory, a nationally recognized theater training program for youth; and the San Francisco Semester and Summer Training Congress, intensive full-time actor training programs for adults. The Conservatory also offers professional and workplace training opportunities through A.C.T. @work.

=== Young Conservatory ===
A.C.T.'s Young Conservatory is a theater training program for youth through the ages of 19. It was founded by Luanne and Ross Graham in 1971. Over more than five decades, the Young Conservatory has been led by directors including Candace Birk, Sharon Newman, Linda Aldrich, Susan Stauter, and Craig Slaight. Jill MacLean has been the director of the Young Conservatory since 2017.

Darren Criss, a Young Conservatory alumnus, thanked Craig Slaight "for shepherding me and so many people here" in his acceptance speech for best performance by a leading actor at the 2025 Tony Awards.

=== Intensive Actor Training ===
A.C.T. offers two full-time intensive actor training programs: the San Francisco Semester and the Summer Training Congress. The first Summer Training Congress took place in the summer of 1969. The San Francisco Semester was launched in 2013.

=== MFA ===
From 1984 to 2022, A.C.T. was WASC accredited to grant Master of Fine Arts degrees for actors. The MFA program concluded in 2022 after A.C.T. determined that it was not financially feasible to continue to offer a freestanding graduate acting training program not affiliated with a university.

== Sound design ==
The first person to be given the title sound designer in regional theater was Dan Dugan at A.C.T. in the late 1960s. The term sound design was introduced to the film world when Francis Ford Coppola directed a production of Private Lives at A.C.T. for which his father, Carmine Coppola, arranged the music and Charlie Richmond was the sound designer while the final cut of the film The Godfather was being edited in 1972.

== Alumni ==
=== Young conservatory actors ===
- Darren Criss
- Brie Larson
- Milo Ventimiglia
- Zendaya

=== Actors ===
- Tomas Arana
- Elizabeth Banks
- Anna Belknap
- Annette Bening
- Carlos Bernard
- Sarayu Blue
- Benjamin Bratt
- Christopher Fitzgerald
- Danny Glover
- Harry Hamlin
- Teri Hatcher
- Amy Irving
- Don Johnson
- Peter Kwong
- Michael Learned
- Delroy Lindo
- Lauren Lane
- Sacheen Littlefeather
- Elizabeth McGovern
- Omar Metwally
- William Paterson
- Dileep Rao
- Jean Rasey
- Anika Noni Rose
- Winona Ryder
- Greg Sestero
- Douglas Sills
- Anna Deavere Smith
- Morgan Spector
- Mfoniso Udofia
- Denzel Washington
- Gedde Watanabe
- Justin Whalin
- Sharr White
- Dane Witherspoon

=== Sound design ===
- Dan Dugan

== See also ==
- List of San Francisco Designated Landmarks
- American Musical Theatre of San Jose
