= 2025 Formula Car Challenge =

2025 formula racing championship

The 2025 Formula Car Challenge presented by Goodyear was the 21st season of the Formula Car Challenge, a multi-event motor racing championship for single-seater open wheel formula racing cars held across the American west coast. The series was sanctioned by the Sports Car Club of America.

Christian Okpysh defended his championship title for the third year in a row.

== Drivers ==
No.	Driver	Car	Status	Rounds
4	(United States) Melvin Kemper Jr.	Star Formula Mazda	G	4
7	(United States) Rodney A. Simmons	Mazda Formula Mazda		2
11	(United States) Ken Boatright	Formula Mazda		3, 5
12	(Canada) Marcus Brodie	1997 Mazda Formula Mazda		1–3
17	(United States) John Ertel	1994 Mazda Formula Star		5–6
20	(United States) Ben Booker	Formula Mazda Star Formula Mazda		1
26	(United States) Aidan Bennitt	Formula Mazda	G	4
28	(United States) Stew Tabak	1993 Mazda Formula		2–7
29	(United States) Christian Okpysh	1997 Mazda Formula Mazda		1–6
63	(Denmark) Lars Jensen	1997 Star Formula Mazda		3, 6–7
67	(United States) Bill Weaver	1997 Star Mazda Formula Mazda		1–2, 4–6
69	(United States) Jeff Clark	Formula Mazda	G	4
77	(United States) Derry O'Donovan	1996 Formula Mazda FM		2, 6–7
78	(United States) Brad Drew	1997 Mazda Formula		2–6

Icon	Legend
G	Guest driver

== Race calendar ==
The 2025 schedule was announced on November 25, 2024, with one round yet to be announced. The FCC Winter Series that saw no entries in 2024 will not return, while the eight-round main series visited the same five destinations it did in 2024. In December 2024, the calendar was revised and the Portland round was shifted to one month earlier.

Round		Circuit	Date	Support bill	Map of circuit locations
1	R1	Sonoma Raceway, Sonoma	March 15	SCCA Majors Championship; San Francisco Region SCCA Series	2025 Formula Car Challenge is located in USA West
1	R2	Sonoma Raceway, Sonoma	March 16	SCCA Majors Championship; San Francisco Region SCCA Series	2025 Formula Car Challenge is located in USA West
2	R3	Thunderhill Raceway Park, Willows	April 5	San Francisco Region SCCA Series; Formula Pro USA Western Championship	2025 Formula Car Challenge is located in USA West
2	R4	Thunderhill Raceway Park, Willows	April 6	San Francisco Region SCCA Series; Formula Pro USA Western Championship	2025 Formula Car Challenge is located in USA West
3	R5	Thunderhill Raceway Park, Willows	May 17	San Francisco Region SCCA Series	2025 Formula Car Challenge is located in USA West
3	R6	Thunderhill Raceway Park, Willows	May 18	San Francisco Region SCCA Series	2025 Formula Car Challenge is located in USA West
4	R7	Portland International Raceway, Portland	June 14	International Conference of Sports Car Clubs; Cascade Sports Car Club Series	2025 Formula Car Challenge is located in USA West
4	R8	Portland International Raceway, Portland	June 15	International Conference of Sports Car Clubs; Cascade Sports Car Club Series	2025 Formula Car Challenge is located in USA West
5	R9	WeatherTech Raceway Laguna Seca, Monterey	June 27	San Francisco Region SCCA Series; Formula Pro USA Western Championship	2025 Formula Car Challenge is located in USA West
5	R10	WeatherTech Raceway Laguna Seca, Monterey	June 28	San Francisco Region SCCA Series; Formula Pro USA Western Championship	2025 Formula Car Challenge is located in USA West
6	R11	Sonoma Raceway, Sonoma	September 13	NASA Northern California Region; Formula Pro USA Western Championship	2025 Formula Car Challenge is located in USA West
6	R12	Sonoma Raceway, Sonoma	September 14	NASA Northern California Region; Formula Pro USA Western Championship	2025 Formula Car Challenge is located in USA West
7	R13	Thunderhill Raceway Park, Willows	October 24	San Francisco Region SCCA Series; Formula Pro USA Western Championship	2025 Formula Car Challenge is located in USA West
7	R14	Thunderhill Raceway Park, Willows	October 25	San Francisco Region SCCA Series; Formula Pro USA Western Championship	2025 Formula Car Challenge is located in USA West
8	R15	Buttonwillow Raceway Park, Buttonwillow	November 14–16	Pacific F2000 Championship; Formula Pro USA Western Championship	2025 Formula Car Challenge is located in USA West
8	R16	Buttonwillow Raceway Park, Buttonwillow	November 14–16	Pacific F2000 Championship; Formula Pro USA Western Championship	2025 Formula Car Challenge is located in USA West

== Race results ==
Round		Circuit	Pole position	Fastest lap	Winning driver
1	R1	Sonoma Raceway	(Canada) Marcus Brodie	(United States) Christian Okpysh	(United States) Christian Okpysh
1	R2	Sonoma Raceway	(Canada) Marcus Brodie	(United States) Christian Okpysh	(Canada) Marcus Brodie
2	R3	Thunderhill Raceway Park	(United States) Christian Okpysh	(United States) Christian Okpysh	(United States) Christian Okpysh
2	R4	Thunderhill Raceway Park	(United States) Bill Weaver	(Canada) Marcus Brodie	(United States) Christian Okpysh
3	R5	Thunderhill Raceway Park	(United States) Christian Okpysh	(United States) Christian Okpysh	(United States) Christian Okpysh
3	R6	Thunderhill Raceway Park	(United States) Christian Okpysh	(United States) Christian Okpysh	(United States) Christian Okpysh
4	R7	Portland International Raceway	(United States) Bill Weaver	(United States) Christian Okpysh	(United States) Christian Okpysh
4	R8	Portland International Raceway	(United States) Bill Weaver	(United States) Bill Weaver	(United States) Bill Weaver
5	R9	WeatherTech Raceway Laguna Seca	(United States) Christian Okpysh	(United States) Christian Okpysh	(United States) Christian Okpysh
5	R10	WeatherTech Raceway Laguna Seca	(United States) Christian Okpysh	(United States) Christian Okpysh	(United States) Christian Okpysh
6	R11	Sonoma Raceway	(United States) Bill Weaver	(United States) Christian Okpysh	(United States) Christian Okpysh
6	R12	Sonoma Raceway	(United States) Christian Okpysh	(United States) Christian Okpysh	(United States) Christian Okpysh
7	R13	Thunderhill Raceway Park	(Denmark) Lars Jensen	(United States) Stew Tabak	(Denmark) Lars Jensen
7	R14	Thunderhill Raceway Park	(Denmark) Lars Jensen	(Denmark) Lars Jensen	(United States) Stew Tabak
8	R15	Buttonwillow Raceway Park	no entries		
8	R16	Buttonwillow Raceway Park	no entries		

== Championship standings ==
=== Scoring system ===
Points were awarded to the top twenty drivers taking the green flag.

Position	**1st**	**2nd**	**3rd**	**4th**	**5th**	**6th**	**7th**	**8th**	**9th**	**10th**	**11th**	**12th**	**13th**	**14th**	**15th**	**16th**	**17th**	**18th**	**19th**	**20th**
Points	29	25	22	20	19	18	17	16	15	14	13	12	11	10	9	8	7	6	5	4

Each driver's three worst results were dropped.

=== Drivers' standings ===
Pos	Driver	SON1		THU1		THU2		POR		LAG		SON2		THU3		BUT		Pts
Pos	Driver	R1	R2	R3	R4	R5	R6	R7	R8	R9	R10	R11	R12	R13	R14	R15	R16	Pts
1	(United States) Christian Okpysh	1	2	**1**	1	**1**	**1**	1	2	**1**	**1**	1	**1**					340
3	(United States) Stew Tabak			5	4	2	4	5	5	3	3	5	3	3	1			260
2	(United States) Bill Weaver	3	3	2	**3**			**2**	**1**	2	2	**2**	2					245
4	(United States) Brad Drew			4	6	3	3	3	3	4	4	4	5					205
5	(Canada) Marcus Brodie	**2**	**1**	3	2	6	2											144
6	(Denmark) Lars Jensen					4	5					3	4	**1**	**2**			135
7	(United States) Derry O'Donovan			7	5							6	6	2	3			119
8	(United States) Ken Boatright					5	6			6	6							73
9	(United States) John Ertel									5	5	7	7					72
10	(United States) Rodney A. Simmons			6	7													35
11	(United States) Ben Booker	DNS	3															22
Guest drivers ineligible to score points
—	(United States) Melvin Kemper Jr.							4	4									0
—	(United States) Aidan Bennitt							6	6									0
—	(United States) Jeff Clark							7	7									0
Pos	Driver	R1	R2	R3	R4	R5	R6	R7	R8	R9	R10	R11	R12	R13	R14	R15	R16	Pts
Pos	Driver	SON1		THU1		THU2		POR		LAG		SON2		THU3		BUT		Pts

Colour	Result
Gold	Winner
Silver	Second place
Bronze	Third place
Green	Points classification
Blue	Non-points classification
Blue	Non-classified finish (NC)
Purple	Retired, not classified (Ret)
Red	Did not qualify (DNQ)
Red	Did not pre-qualify (DNPQ)
Black	Disqualified (DSQ)
White	Did not start (DNS)
White	Withdrew (WD)
White	Race cancelled (C)
Blank	Did not practice (DNP)
Blank	Did not arrive (DNA)
Blank	Excluded (EX)

**Bold** – Pole
Italics – Fastest Lap
