= 2025 Formula Pro USA Western Championship =

Season of motorsports

The 2025 Formula Pro USA Western Series was the sixth season of the championship for Formula Regional and Formula 4 cars established in the West Coast of the United States. The championship was promoted and organized by Exclusive Racing and Exclusive Auctions, and was run under the same sporting regulations as the FIA-sanctioned Formula Regional Americas Championship and Formula 4 United States Championship.

It began in March, with the championship spanning six weekends until November. World Speed Motorsports driver Larry Schnur claimed the FPUSA-3 title with two races to spare when his closest competitor, Charles Duncan, did not enter the final round. The FPUSA-4 class was won by Ridgeley Welsh, also driving for World Speed Motorsports, while Kiwi Motorsport's Carolyn Fitzgerald took victory in the Women's Racing Series class.

== Teams and drivers ==
Drivers were able to enter either the FPUSA-3 or the FPUSA-4 class, with the former using a Ligier JS F3 car and the latter a Ligier JS-F4 car. All cars were powered by Honda and used Avon tires.

Team	No.	Driver	Class	Rounds
Formula Pro USA 3 (FPUSA-3) entries
Jensen Global Advisors	1	(United States) John O'Donnell		5
Jensen Global Advisors	11	(United States) Aiden Zelaya		6
World Speed Motorsports	3	(United States) Larry Schnur		1–3, 5–6
World Speed Motorsports	38	(United States) Dan Decker		4–5
World Speed Motorsports	63	(United States) Charles Duncan		2, 4–5
Crosslink Motorsports	13	(United States) Barrett Wolfe		3
Kiwi Motorsport	15	(United States) Jake Bonilla		4
Kiwi Motorsport	01	(Brazil) Bruno Ribeiro		3
Atlantic Racing Team	88	(Canada) James Lawley		1
Atlantic Racing Team	177	(Australia) Nicolas Stati		1
Formula Pro USA 4 (FPUSA-4) entries
Jensen Global Advisors	1	(United States) Marco Martin		3
Jensen Global Advisors	1	(South Africa) Zach Fourie		1
Jensen Global Advisors	15	(South Africa) Zach Fourie		3
Jensen Global Advisors	2	(United States) Ana Palestro	F	All
Jensen Global Advisors	3	(United States) Robert Arana		4, 6
Jensen Global Advisors	3	(United States) Aiden Zelaya		3
Jensen Global Advisors	7	(United States) Aiden Zelaya		4–5
Jensen Global Advisors	7	(United States) Max Parker		3
World Speed Motorsports	14	(United States) Ridgeley Welsh		All
World Speed Motorsports	15	(United States) Christopher DeFreitas		1–2
World Speed Motorsports	16	(United States) Yashom Kapoor		All
World Speed Motorsports	17	(United States) Austin Tiller		5
Crosslink Motorsports	20	(United States) Austin Kaszuba		6
Crosslink Motorsports	34	(United States) Aidan Schuh		6
Crosslink Motorsports	134	(United States) Joshua Griffith		3
Kiwi Motorsport	26	(United States) Ayden Kohut		3
Kiwi Motorsport	123	(United States) Carolyn Fitzgerald	F	All

Icon	Status
F	Female driver entered in the Women's Racing Series class

== Race calendar ==
The 2025 calendar was held over twelve races spanning across six weekends. The series raced at the same four circuits as it did the previous year.

Round		Circuit	Date	Support bill	Map of circuit locations
1	R1	Sonoma Raceway, Sonoma	March 15	SCCA Majors Championship; Formula Car Challenge	2025 Formula Pro USA Western Championship is located in California
1	R2	Sonoma Raceway, Sonoma	March 16	SCCA Majors Championship; Formula Car Challenge	2025 Formula Pro USA Western Championship is located in California
2	R3	Thunderhill Raceway Park, Willows	April 5	San Francisco Region SCCA Series; Formula Car Challenge	2025 Formula Pro USA Western Championship is located in California
2	R4	Thunderhill Raceway Park, Willows	April 6	San Francisco Region SCCA Series; Formula Car Challenge	2025 Formula Pro USA Western Championship is located in California
3	R5	WeatherTech Raceway Laguna Seca, Monterey	June 28	San Francisco Region SCCA Series; Pacific F2000 Championship	2025 Formula Pro USA Western Championship is located in California
3	R6	WeatherTech Raceway Laguna Seca, Monterey	June 29	San Francisco Region SCCA Series; Pacific F2000 Championship	2025 Formula Pro USA Western Championship is located in California
4	R7	Sonoma Raceway, Sonoma	September 13	NASA Northern California Region; Formula Car Challenge	2025 Formula Pro USA Western Championship is located in California
4	R8	Sonoma Raceway, Sonoma	September 14	NASA Northern California Region; Formula Car Challenge	2025 Formula Pro USA Western Championship is located in California
5	R9	Thunderhill Raceway Park, Willows	October 24	San Francisco Region SCCA Series; Formula Car Challenge	2025 Formula Pro USA Western Championship is located in California
5	R10	Thunderhill Raceway Park, Willows	October 25	San Francisco Region SCCA Series; Formula Car Challenge	2025 Formula Pro USA Western Championship is located in California
6	R11	Buttonwillow Raceway Park, Buttonwillow	November 15	California Sports Car Club; Formula Car Challenge	2025 Formula Pro USA Western Championship is located in California
6	R12	Buttonwillow Raceway Park, Buttonwillow	November 16	California Sports Car Club; Formula Car Challenge	2025 Formula Pro USA Western Championship is located in California

== Race results ==
Round		Circuit	Pole position	FPUSA-3		FPUSA-4		FPUSA-WRS
Round		Circuit	Pole position	Fastest lap	Winning driver	Fastest lap	Winning driver	Winning driver
1	R1	Sonoma Raceway	(Canada) James Lawley	(Australia) Nicolas Stati	(Canada) James Lawley	(South Africa) Zach Fourie	(South Africa) Zach Fourie	(United States) Carolyn Fitzgerald
1	R2	Sonoma Raceway	(Canada) James Lawley	(Australia) Nicolas Stati	(Canada) James Lawley	(South Africa) Zach Fourie	(South Africa) Zach Fourie	(United States) Carolyn Fitzgerald
2	R3	Thunderhill Raceway Park	(United States) Larry Schnur	(United States) Larry Schnur	(United States) Larry Schnur	(United States) Yashom Kapoor	(United States) Yashom Kapoor	(United States) Carolyn Fitzgerald
2	R4	Thunderhill Raceway Park	(United States) Larry Schnur	(United States) Larry Schnur	(United States) Larry Schnur	(United States) Ridgeley Welsh	(United States) Yashom Kapoor	(United States) Carolyn Fitzgerald
3	R5	WeatherTech Raceway Laguna Seca	(Brazil) Bruno Ribeiro	(Brazil) Bruno Ribeiro	(Brazil) Bruno Ribeiro	(South Africa) Zach Fourie	(South Africa) Zach Fourie	(United States) Ana Palestro
3	R6	WeatherTech Raceway Laguna Seca	(Brazil) Bruno Ribeiro	(Brazil) Bruno Ribeiro	(Brazil) Bruno Ribeiro	(South Africa) Zach Fourie	(South Africa) Zach Fourie	(United States) Ana Palestro
4	R7	Sonoma Raceway	(United States) Jake Bonilla	(United States) Jake Bonilla	(United States) Jake Bonilla	(United States) Aiden Zelaya	(United States) Robert Arana	(United States) Carolyn Fitzgerald
4	R8	Sonoma Raceway	(United States) Jake Bonilla	(United States) Jake Bonilla	(United States) Jake Bonilla	(United States) Yashom Kapoor	(United States) Yashom Kapoor	(United States) Ana Palestro
5	R9	Thunderhill Raceway Park	(United States) Dan Decker	(United States) Dan Decker	(United States) Dan Decker	(United States) Ridgeley Welsh	(United States) Ridgeley Welsh	(United States) Carolyn Fitzgerald
5	R10	Thunderhill Raceway Park	(United States) John O'Donnell	(United States) John O'Donnell	(United States) John O'Donnell	(United States) Ridgeley Welsh	(United States) Ridgeley Welsh	(United States) Ana Palestro
6	R11	Buttonwillow Raceway Park	(United States) Larry Schnur	(United States) Aiden Zelaya	(United States) Larry Schnur	(United States) Austin Kaszuba	(United States) Austin Kaszuba	(United States) Ana Palestro
6	R12	Buttonwillow Raceway Park	(United States) Aiden Zelaya	(United States) Aiden Zelaya	(United States) Aiden Zelaya	(United States) Austin Kaszuba	(United States) Austin Kaszuba	(United States) Ana Palestro

== Season report ==
The 2025 season commenced Sonoma Raceway with Atlantic's James Lawley claiming two pole positions. He then continued to head teammate Nicolas Stati and WSM's Larry Schnur in both races, with Stati setting the fastest laps on each day. The F4 class saw Jensen's Zach Fourie sweep the weekend, leading WSM's Ridgeley Welsh in both races, with his teammates Christopher DeFreitas and Yashom Kapoor each taking a third place. The standings after the weekend saw Fourie and Lawley leading their respective classes.

Thunderhill Raceway Park held round two, and the top two in F3 were absent, leaving Schnur to dominate in their stead, leading WSM's Charles Duncan in both races to take maximum points and the championship lead in class. The F4 class saw a similar picture, with an absent Fourie replaced by Kapoor as the man in front. Kapoor won both races to take a five-point lead in the standings, while Welsh claimed two more second places and Kiwi Motorsport's Carolyn Fitzgerald finished third on both occasions.

Round three at Laguna Seca brought yet another new face to the front in the F3 class, as Kiwi's Bruno Ribeiro and Crosslink's Barrett Wolfe formed the top two in both races on their series debut. Schnur collected two more third-place finishes to bolster his championship lead. The F4 class saw ten cars entered, a high-point for the series, but it was returnee Fourie who was once again on top in both races. Second and fourth place for Kapoor were enough to retain a one-point lead, with Welsh now ten points behind.

Formula Pro USA returned to Sonoma for round four, where Kiwi's Jake Bonilla dominated proceedings in F3, winning both races and taking the F3 track record in the process. Duncan claimed two more second places, leading teammate Dan Decker to close up to Schnur in the standings. The F4 class saw a new winner in race one in Jensen's Robert Arana, before Kapoor was back on top in race two to bolster his points lead again. Jensen's Aiden Zelaya and Welsh also claimed two further podium finishes.

A second round at Thunderhill was up next, where Decker won race one in F3 before race two went to another debutant in Jensen's John O'Donnell, despite dropping to the rear of the field at the start. Duncan meanwhile took two more second places to slightly close up to Schnur in the standings. Welsh dominated the field in F4 by taking two wins, taking the lead in the standings off of Kapoor, who had held it since the second round of the season. He finished third in both races, behind Zelaya, who built on his podium streak.

The season final was held at a rainy Buttonwillow Raceway Park. With Duncan and Decker both absent, Schnur was able to seal the F3 class title without opposition, sharing wins in the two races with Zelaya, who was the only other competitor in F3 when he made the mid-season step up from F4. Two second places for Welsh were enough to claim the F4 class title as both wins went to Crosslink's Austin Kaszuba on debut. Fitzgerald meanwhile narrowly became the inaugural Women's Racing Series champion in third overall.

== Championship standings ==
Points were awarded as follows:

Position	**1st**	**2nd**	**3rd**	**4th**	**5th**	**6th**	**7th**	**8th**	**9th**	**10th**	**FL**
Points	25	18	15	12	10	8	6	4	2	1	2

=== Drivers' standings ===
Pos	Driver	SON1		THU1		LAG		SON2		THU2		BUT		Pts
Pos	Driver	R1	R2	R3	R4	R5	R6	R7	R8	R9	R10	R11	R12	Pts
Formula Pro USA 3 (FPUSA-3)
1	(United States) Larry Schnur	3	3	**1**	**1**	3	3			3	4	**1**	2	184
2	(United States) Charles Duncan			2	2			2	2	2	2			108
3	(United States) Dan Decker							3	3	**1**	3			72
=4	(Brazil) Bruno Ribeiro					**1**	**1**							54
=4	(United States) Jake Bonilla							**1**	**1**					54
6	(Canada) James Lawley	**1**	**1**											50
7	(United States) Aiden Zelaya											2	**1**	47
8	(Australia) Nicolas Stati	2	2											40
9	(United States) John O'Donnell									4†	**1**			39
10	(United States) Barrett Wolfe					2	2							36
Formula Pro USA 4 (FPUSA-4)
1	(United States) Ridgeley Welsh	2	2	2	2	5	3	3	2	1	1	2	2	222
2	(United States) Yashom Kapoor	4	3	1	1	2	4	4	1	3	3	3	7	199
3	(United States) Carolyn Fitzgerald **F**	5	4	3	3	8	7	5	6	5	6	7	5	114
4	(United States) Ana Palestro **F**	6†	6	4	4†	7	6	6	5	6†	5	6	4	110
5	(South Africa) Zach Fourie	1	1			1	1							108
6	(United States) Aiden Zelaya					9	2	2	3	2	2			91
7	(United States) Robert Arana							1	4			5	6	55
8	(United States) Austin Kaszuba											1	1	54
9	(United States) Aidan Schuh											4	3	27
10	(United States) Christopher DeFreitas	3	5	Ret	Ret									25
11	(United States) Austin Tiller									4	4			24
12	(United States) Ayden Kohut					4	5							22
13	(United States) Joshua Griffith					3	9							17
14	(United States) Max Parker					6	8							12
—	(United States) Marco Martin					DNS	Ret							0
Pos	Driver	R1	R2	R3	R4	R5	R6	R7	R8	R9	R10	R11	R12	Pts
Pos	Driver	SON1		THU1		LAG		SON2		THU2		BUT		Pts

Colour	Result
Gold	Winner
Silver	Second place
Bronze	Third place
Green	Points classification
Blue	Non-points classification
Blue	Non-classified finish (NC)
Purple	Retired, not classified (Ret)
Red	Did not qualify (DNQ)
Red	Did not pre-qualify (DNPQ)
Black	Disqualified (DSQ)
White	Did not start (DNS)
White	Withdrew (WD)
White	Race cancelled (C)
Blank	Did not practice (DNP)
Blank	Did not arrive (DNA)
Blank	Excluded (EX)

**Bold** – Pole
Italics – Fastest Lap

=== Women's Racing Series standings ===
Women's Racing Series entrants scored championship points on their overall FPUSA-4 finishing position; the positions shown below are their finishing positions within the Women's Racing Series class.

Pos	Driver	SON1		THU1		LAG		SON2		THU2		BUT		Pts
Pos	Driver	R1	R2	R3	R4	R5	R6	R7	R8	R9	R10	R11	R12	Pts
1	(United States) Carolyn Fitzgerald	1	1	1	1	2	2	1	2	1	2	2	2	114
2	(United States) Ana Palestro	2†	2	2	2†	1	1	2	1	2†	1	1	1	110
Pos	Driver	R1	R2	R3	R4	R5	R6	R7	R8	R9	R10	R11	R12	Pts
Pos	Driver	SON1		THU1		LAG		SON2		THU2		BUT		Pts
