= William Baker Faville =

American architect (1866–1946)

William Baker Faville (November 13, 1866 –1946) was an American architect.

He was born in California, did some growing up in western New York State, and studied at the Massachusetts Institute of Technology. He met Walter Danforth Bliss, with whom he later partnered, and they both then worked for McKim, Mead & White. He returned to the west coast and stayed. In 1915, he served as president of the San Francisco chapter of the American Institute of Architects (AIA). In 1922-1924, he served as the AIA's national president.

A number of his works are listed on the National Register of Historic Places (NRHP).

Works he is associated with include:

- San Rafael Improvement Club, 1800 5th Ave., San Rafael, CA, designed to serve as the Victrola Pavilion in the 1915 San Francisco exposition, relocated and repurposed in 1916. NRHP-listed.
- Oakland Hotel, 260 13th St., Oakland, CA, (Bliss & Faville), NRHP-listed
- Oakland Public Library (1900–01), 659 14th St., Oakland, CA, (Bliss & Faville), NRHP-listed
- Rialto Building, 116 New Montgomery St., San Francisco, CA (Bliss and Faville), NRHP-listed
- Southern Pacific Railroad Company's Sacramento Depot, 5th and I Sts., Sacramento, CA (Bliss & Faville), NRHP-listed
- US Post Office-Willows Main, 315 W. Sycamore St., Willows, CA (Faville, William B.), NRHP-listed
- Woman's Athletic Club of San Francisco, 640 Sutter St., San Francisco, CA (Faville, William B.), NRHP-listed
- The second Saint Francis Hotel (1902 to 1904), 301–345 Powell Street on Union Square in San Francisco, destroyed in 1906 earthquake
- The third Saint Francis Hotel (1906).
- Bank of California Building, 400 California Street, San Francisco, California (Bliss & Faville), San Francisco Historic Landmark No. 3
- Geary Theater (originally named the Columbia Theater), 415 Geary Street, San Francisco, California (Bliss & Faville), San Francisco Historic Landmark No. 82
- Savings Union Bank Building, 1 Grant Avenue, San Francisco, California (Bliss & Faville), San Francisco Historic Landmark No. 132
- Masonic Temple, 25 Van Ness Avenue, San Francisco (Bliss & Faville)
- Matson Building (1924), 215 Market Street, San Francisco, California (Bliss & Faville)

Faville also designed the eight central palaces of the 1915 Panama-Pacific International Exposition in San Francisco: the palaces of Education, Food Products, Agriculture, Liberal Arts, Manufactures, Transportation, Mines and Metallurgy, and Varied Industries. These were temporary structures that were razed after the Exposition closed.
