= One Market Plaza =

Office buildings in San Francisco, California

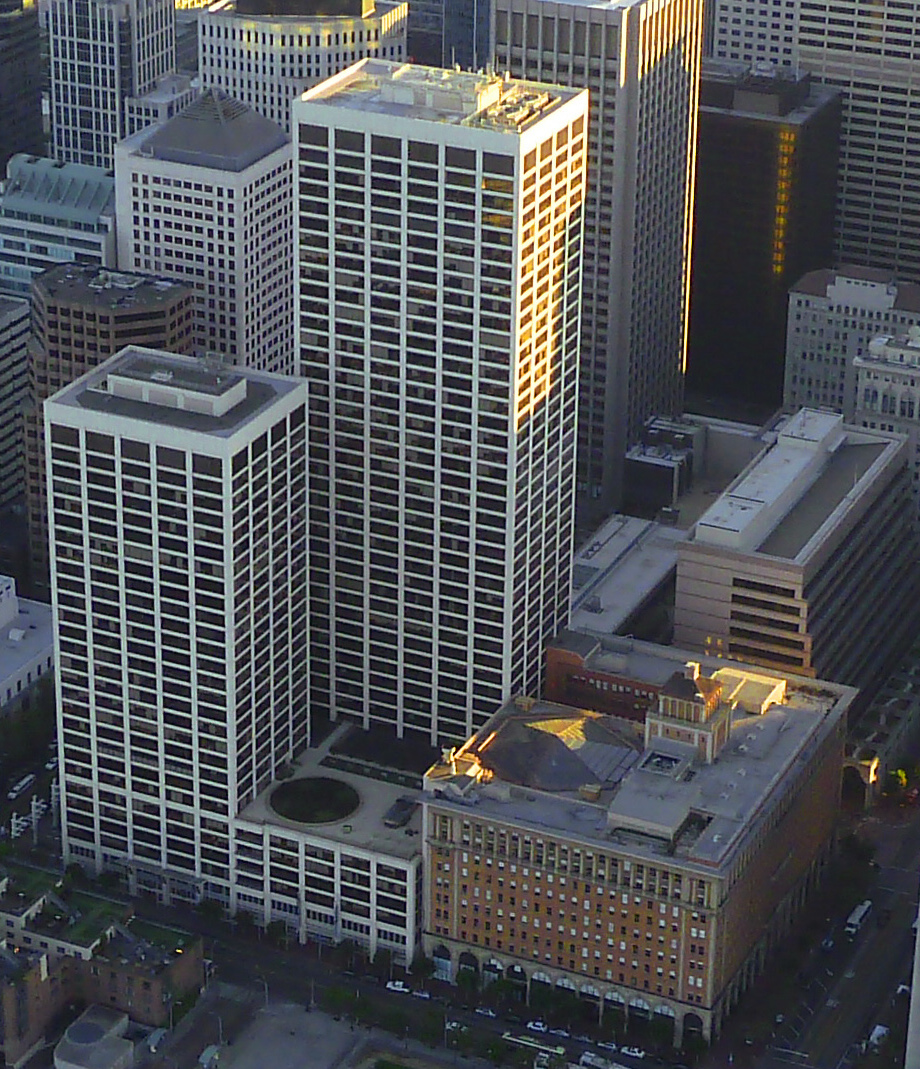
- Aerial view of One Market Plaza: Steuart Tower (left, shorter white building), Spear Tower (center, taller white building), and Southern Pacific Building (right, shortest brick building)

- Location within San Francisco
- Alternative names: Del Monte Building

General information
- Type: Commercial offices
- Location: 1 Market Street; San Francisco, California
- Coordinates: 37.79329°N 122.39452°W
- Completed: 1976
- Owner: Paramount Group, Inc.; Blackstone

Height
- Roof: 172 m (564 ft)

Technical details
- Floor count: 43
- Floor area: 1,460,071 sq ft (135,645.0 m^{2})

Design and construction
- Architect: Welton Becket Associates

Steuart Tower
- Interactive map of the Steuart Tower area

General information
- Type: Commercial offices
- Location: 1 Market Street; San Francisco, California
- Coordinates: 37.79335°N 122.39382°W
- Completed: 1976
- Owner: Paramount Group, Inc.

Height
- Roof: 111 m (364 ft)

Technical details
- Floor count: 28
- Floor area: 31,590 m^{2} (340,000 sq ft)

Design and construction
- Architect: Welton Becket Associates

One Market Plaza is a complex of three office buildings at 1 Market Street along the San Francisco Embarcadero. The historic 11-story Southern Pacific Building, also known as "The Landmark", was completed in 1916, and incorporated into the development in 1976 that includes the 43-storey 172 metres (564 feet) Spear Tower, and the 27-storey, 111 metres (364 feet) Steuart Tower. At over 1.5 billion pounds, the complex is considered the heaviest development in San Francisco.

== History ==
The plaza was first owned by Morgan Stanley Real Estate and Paramount Group. Later in 2007, Paramount Group purchased a half-interest from Morgan Stanley for $720 million. By 2014, Paramount controlled a 51% stake and the rest by Blackstone.

The complex was renovated in 1996 by the architect firm César Pelli & Associates Architects. In Spring 2014 a new renovation began, which was completed in 2016.

After Southern Pacific's merger with Union Pacific, the Landmark building was sold to The Martin Group in 1997 for $50 million, after plans by another developer to convert the building to a hotel fell through. An $88 million renovation brought modern amenities such as air conditioning and hot water to the building. It later hosted the headquarters of Del Monte Foods for ten years on the building's top three floors. In 2018, Google took lease of 300,000 sqft at The Landmark.

== Tenants ==
As of 2017, Google, as the anchor tenant, occupied 321,680 sqft. Others are Morgan, Lewis & Bockius, Autodesk, Visa Inc. and Capital Research.

== Gallery ==
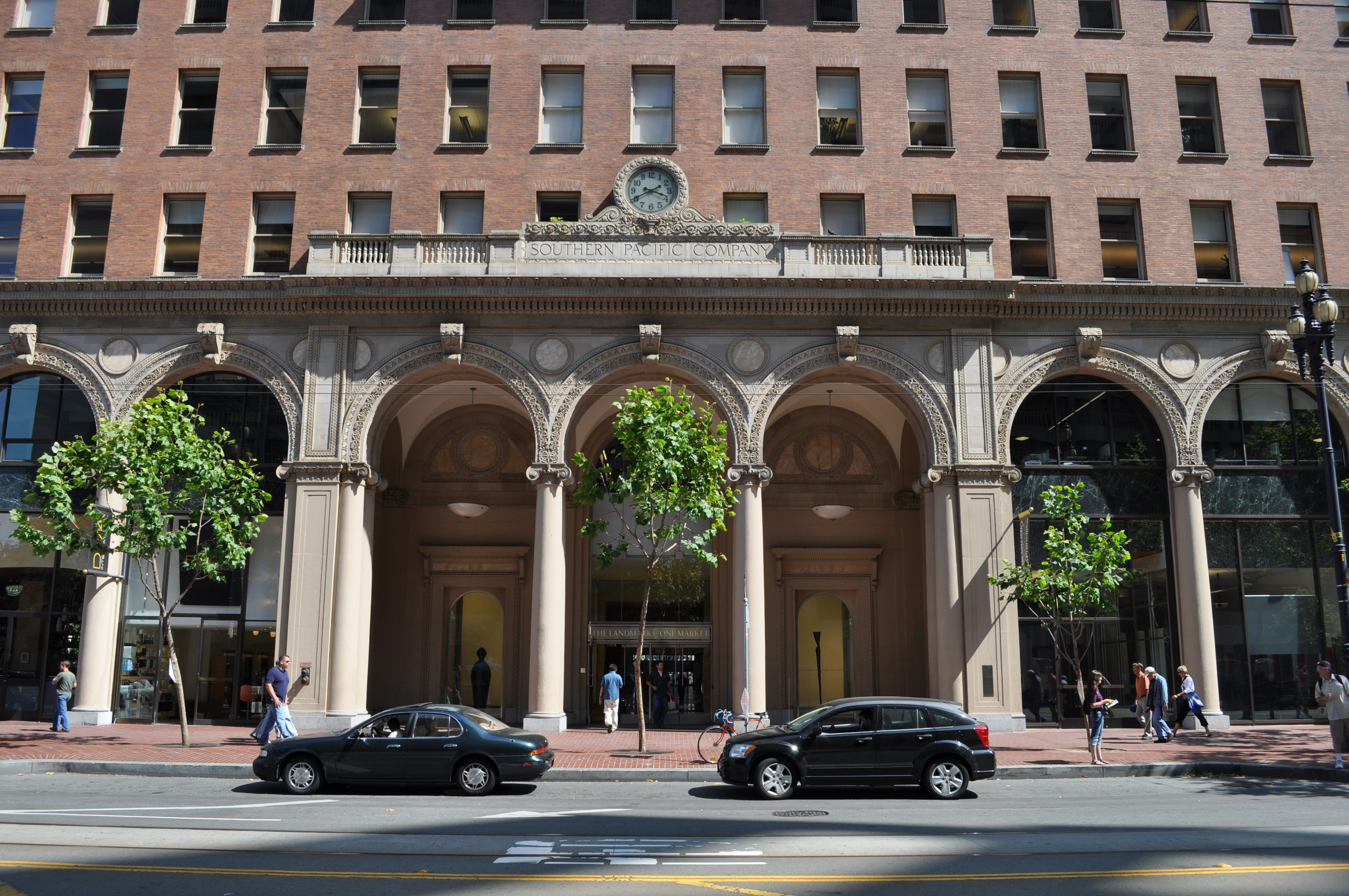
The Market street facade of the Southern Pacific Building

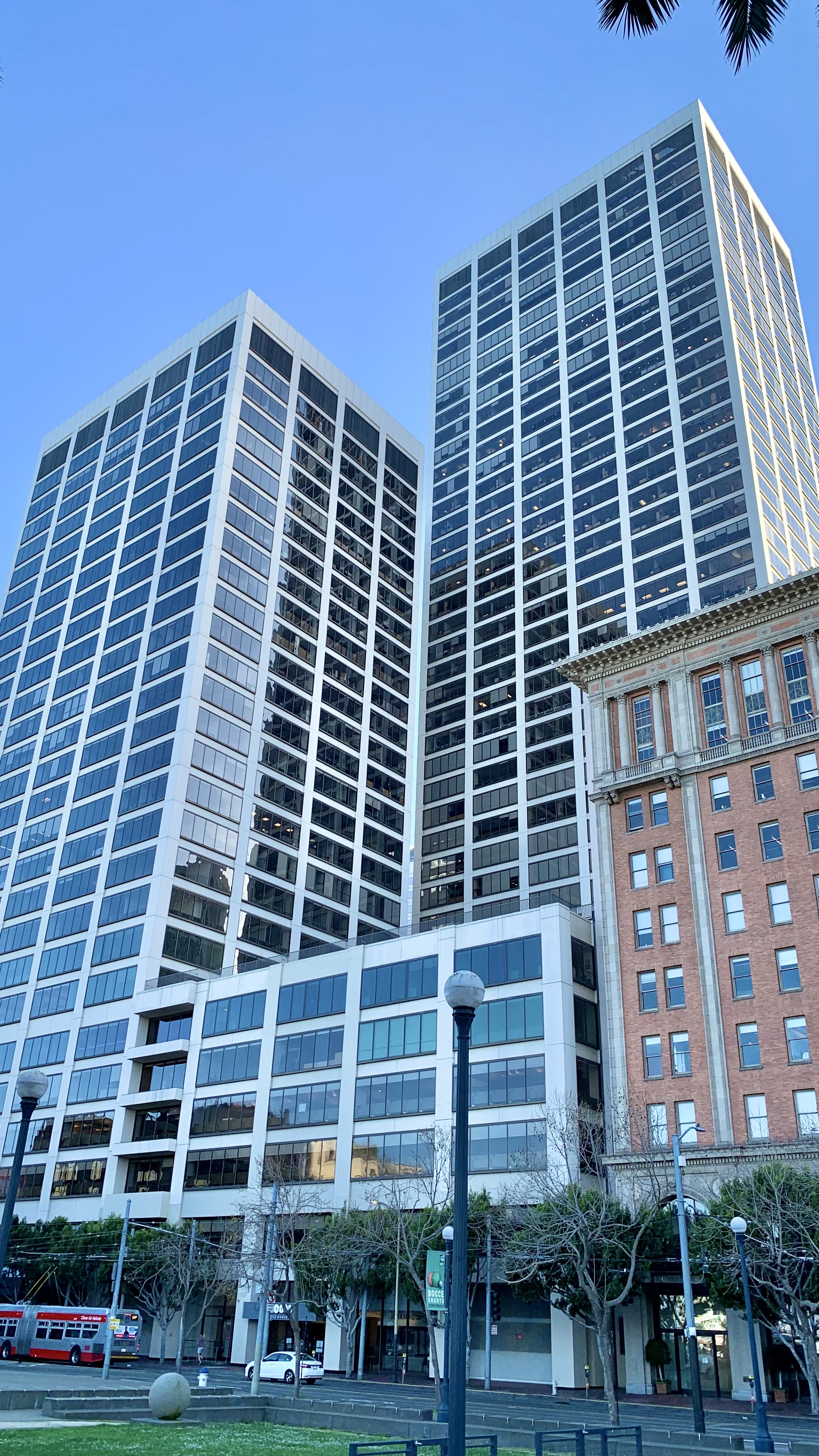
Steuart Tower and Spear Tower from the ground

== See also ==
- San Francisco's tallest buildings
