= San Rafael Improvement Club =

- U.S. National Register of Historic Places
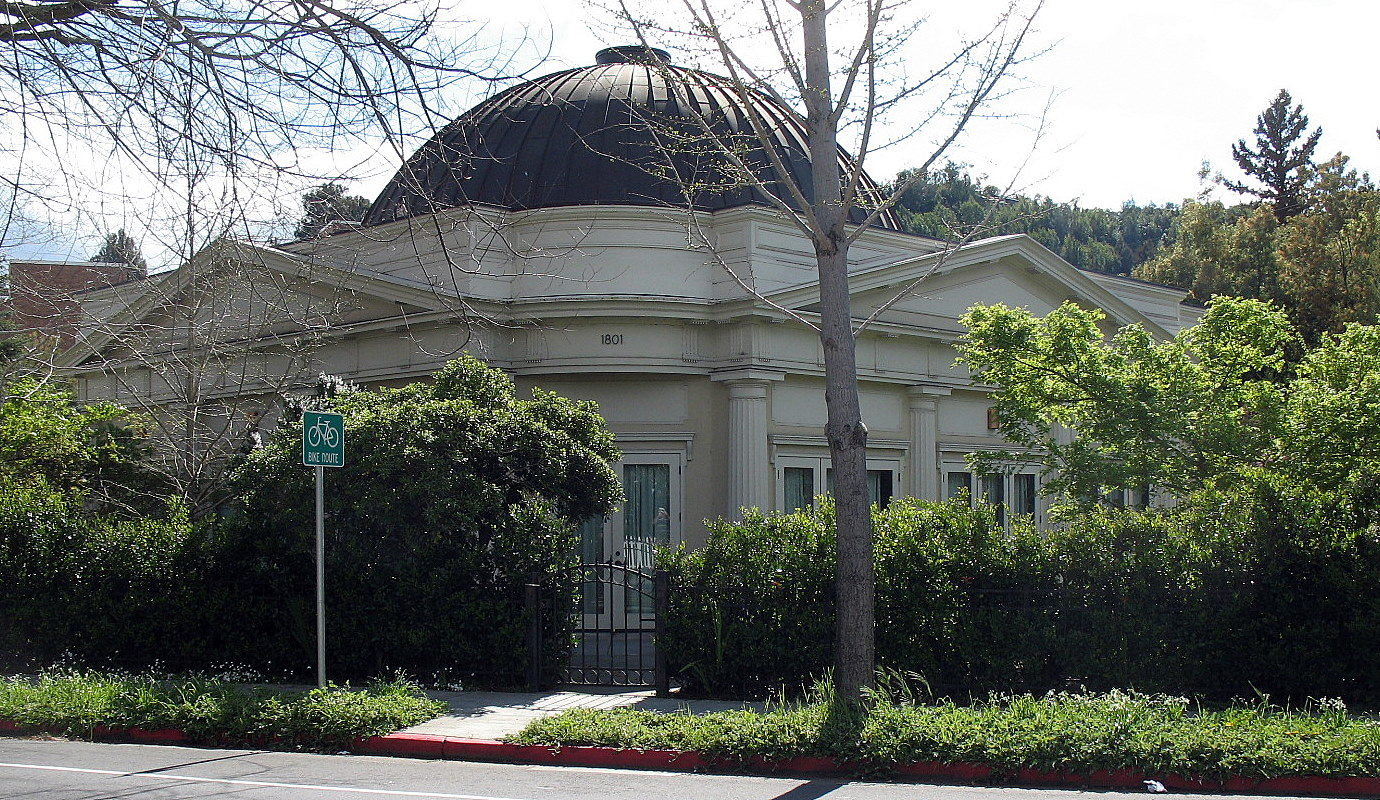

- Location within California
- Location: 1800 5th Ave., San Rafael, California
- Coordinates: 37°58′30″N 122°32′20″W
- Area: 0.6 acres (0.24 ha)
- Built: 1915, 1916
- Architect: William B. Faville
- Architectural style: Classical Revival
- NRHP reference No.: 84000907
- Added to NRHP: March 29, 1984

The San Rafael Improvement Club building, at 1800 5th Ave. in San Rafael, California, was built in 1915. It was listed on the National Register of Historic Places in 1984.

It was built in 1915 for the Panama–Pacific International Exposition in San Francisco, as the Victrola company Pavilion, inside the Palace of Liberal Arts. and was disassembled, relocated, and reassembled in 1916 at San Rafael, California to be used as a permanent clubhouse building the San Rafael Improvement Club, a civic organization founded in 1902.

"In 1902, local citizens formed a group to combat the mosquito infestation in Marin, which started with both men and women — originally called the Village — but later became a women’s organization." - Marin History Museum

It is a wooden building about 63 by 63 feet (19 m × 19 m) in plan. It was designed by William B. Faville in Classical Revival style. When it was reassembled, a roof was added. It was eventually sold by the club. It was unused from 1997 to at least 2018.

The only other building surviving from the 1915 exposition is the San Francisco Palace of Fine Arts.
