= Walter Danforth Bliss =

American architect

- Born: 1874; Nevada
- Died: May 9, 1956 (aged 81–82); Nevada
- Education: Massachusetts Institute of Technology
- Occupation: Architect
- Spouse: Edith P. Bliss
- Parent(s): Duane Leroy; Elizabeth Bliss

Walter Danforth Bliss (1874–1956) was an American architect from California. Many of his buildings are listed on the National Register of Historic Places.

== Biography ==
=== Early life ===
Walter Danforth Bliss was born in Nevada in 1874. His parents were Duane Leroy Bliss and Elizabeth Bliss. He graduated from the Massachusetts Institute of Technology in Cambridge, Massachusetts, with a Bachelor of Science in architecture.

=== Career ===
He started his career as a draftsman for McKim, Mead & White in New York City, the architectural firm of Charles Follen McKim (1847–1909), William Rutherford Mead (1846–1928) and Stanford White (1852–1906).

In 1903, he designed the private residence of banker Isaias W. Hellman (1842–1920) in Lake Tahoe, known as the Hellman-Ehrman Mansion.

==== Collaboration with William Baker Faville ====
Together with William Baker Faville (1866–1946), whom he met at MIT, he designed the building for the Oakland Public Library located at 659 14th Street in Oakland, California, in 1900–1901. The construction was partly funded by the Carnegie Foundation. It now serves as the African American Museum and Library at Oakland, and it is listed on the National Register of Historic Places listings in Alameda County, California, since August 11, 1983. In 1902, they designed the Rialto Building located at 116 New Montgomery Street in San Francisco, it was later destroyed by a fire that same year . It was demolished in 1906, and they rebuilt it in 1910. It was added to the National Register of Historic Places listings in San Francisco, California, on January 3, 2011. From 1902 to 1904, they designed the second Saint Francis Hotel located at 301-345 Powell Street on Union Square in San Francisco. The first San Francis Hotel had been designed by Hart Wood (1880–1957). This new 250-room hotel was commissioned by Charles Crocker (1822–1888), a railroad executive. However, it was destroyed and burned down by the 1906 San Francisco earthquake. In 1906, they built a third San Francis Hotel. It became the largest hotel on the Pacific Coast in the early twentieth century. In 1905, they designed the Magee Building in San Francisco. In 1907, they designed the second Columbia Theater in San Francisco. From 1909 to 1910, they designed the Geary Theater, located at 415 Geary Street. It is listed on the National Register of Historic Places listings in San Francisco, California, since May 27, 1975. It now houses the American Conservatory Theater.

In 1910 and 1911, they designed the Banker's Hotel in Oakland, California. In 1911, they designed the Mission of the Good Samaritan building of the Episcopal Community Center in San Francisco. In 1912–1915, they designed the James Leary Flood Mansion in Nob Hill, San Francisco. In 1916, they designed the Southern Pacific Building located at 1 Market Street in San Francisco. The same year, they designed the Metropolitan Club of San Francisco, a women's private member's club located at 640 Sutter Street. In 1918, they designed Guigné Court, a 16,000-square-foot Mediterranean Revival estate in Hillsborough, California. It was built for Christian de Guigne II, heir to the Stauffer Chemical, the Leslie Salt Company and gold rush fortunes.

In 1920, they designed the Hallidie Plaza branch of the Bank of Italy in San Francisco, California. In 1921, they designed the Matson Building and Annex located at 215 Market Street in San Francisco. It served as the headquarters of Matson, Inc. (NYSE: MATX) from 1922 to 1947. It was sold to the Pacific Gas and Electric Company (NYSE: PCG) in 1972. It was added to the National Register of Historic Places listings in San Francisco, California, on November 29, 1995. In 1922, they designed a State of California Office Building in San Francisco. In 1924, they designed the Administration Building, Atascadero Colony located at 6500 Palma Avenue in Atascadero, California, and the Atascadero Printery located at 6351 Olmeda in Atascadero, which are listed on the National Register of Historic Places listings in San Luis Obispo County, California. In 1924–1926, they designed the Southern Pacific Railroad Company's Sacramento Depot in Sacramento, California. It has been listed on the National Register of Historic Places listings in Sacramento County, California, since April 21, 1975.

From 1934 to 1936, they designed the Stockton United States Post Office located at 401 North San Joaquin Street in Stockton, California. It has been listed on the National Register of Historic Places listings in San Joaquin County, California, since February 10, 1983.

==== Collaboration with William Baker Faville and Hart Wood ====
Together with Hart Wood (1880–1957), in 1907 and 1908, they designed the Bank of California Building located at 400 California Street in San Francisco, California.

=== Personal life ===
He was married to Edith Pillsbury Bliss (Bliss and Holmes Descendants by Elinor Bliss and Arthur Bliss Dayton, New Haven County Historical Society, 1961). They resided at 2990 Vallejo Street in San Francisco, next door to architect Edgar A. Mathews.

=== Death ===
He died on May 9, 1956, in Nevada.
