= African American Museum and Library at Oakland =

- Oakland Public Library
- U.S. National Register of Historic Places
- Oakland Designated Landmark
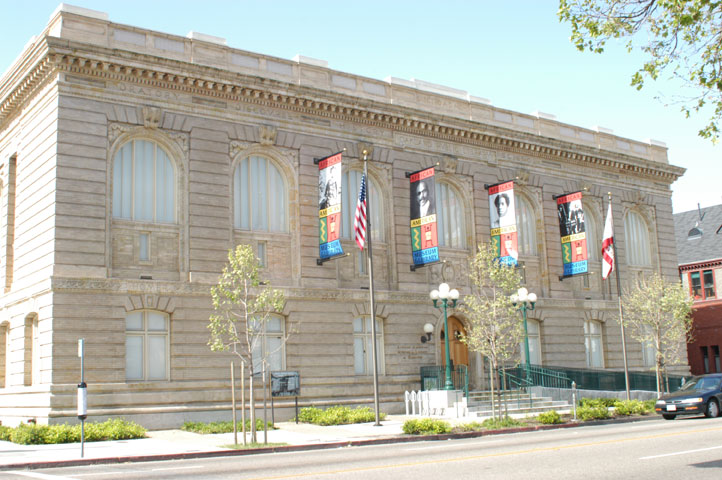
- The African American Museum & Library at Oakland

- Location within Oakland, California Location within California Location within the United States
- Location: 659 14th Street; Oakland, CA, U.S.
- Coordinates: 37°48′22″N 122°16′35″W
- Built: 1900
- Architects: Walter Danforth Bliss, William Baker Faville
- Architectural style: Beaux Arts
- NRHP reference No.: 83001173
- ODL No.: 48

Significant dates
- Added to NRHP: August 11, 1983
- Designated ODL: 1981

The African American Museum and Library at Oakland (AAMLO) is a museum and non-circulating library in the Oakland Public Library system dedicated to preserving African American history, experiences and culture. Located on 14th Street in Downtown Oakland, California, United States, the museum contains an extensive archival collection of such artifacts as diaries, correspondence, photos, and periodicals.

== History ==
The AAMLO is located at the Charles S. Greene building which previously was the Carnegie library. The building served as the Oakland Main Library from 1902 to 1951.

The AAMLO began as a private collection in 1946, and on July 2, 1965, became the East Bay Negro Historical Society (EBNHS). It later changed its name to the Northern California Center for Afro-American History & Life, before being incorporated into the city of Oakland in 1994 under its current name, the African American Museum and Library at Oakland.

Eugene and Ruth Lasartemay and Jesse and Marcella Ford began collecting artifacts and documents creating the private collection in 1946. Initially housed in a small shop front on Grove Street (now Martin Luther King Jr. Way), the collection grew quickly and in 1982, was moved into the Oakland Public Library's Golden Gate Branch. It officially became AAMLO, a public/private partnership, in 1994. AAMLO moved into its current location in 2002.

== Collections ==
Among more than 160 collections in the library are archives relating to Martin Luther King Jr., Malcolm X, the Black Panthers, Africa, and genealogy. Materials include photographs, manuscripts, letters, diaries, newspapers, recorded oral histories, videos, and microfilms. AAMLO's two galleries host changing exhibitions of art, history, and culture, including collaborative exhibitions.

AAMLO's collections include:

- Ida Jackson - Oakland's first African American schoolteacher
- Ron Dellums - Congressman and mayor of Oakland, California
- Marcus Foster - Superintendent of Oakland Schools assassinated in 1973
- Barbara Lee - Bay Area Congresswoman
- Morrie Turner - Cartoonist, creator of the comic strip Wee Pals
- Henry Delton Williams - Hollywood and Motown designer
- Records of the Oakland Black Cowboy Association

== See also ==
- List of museums focused on African Americans
