= United States Post Office (Willows, California) =

- US Post Office—Willows Main
- U.S. National Register of Historic Places
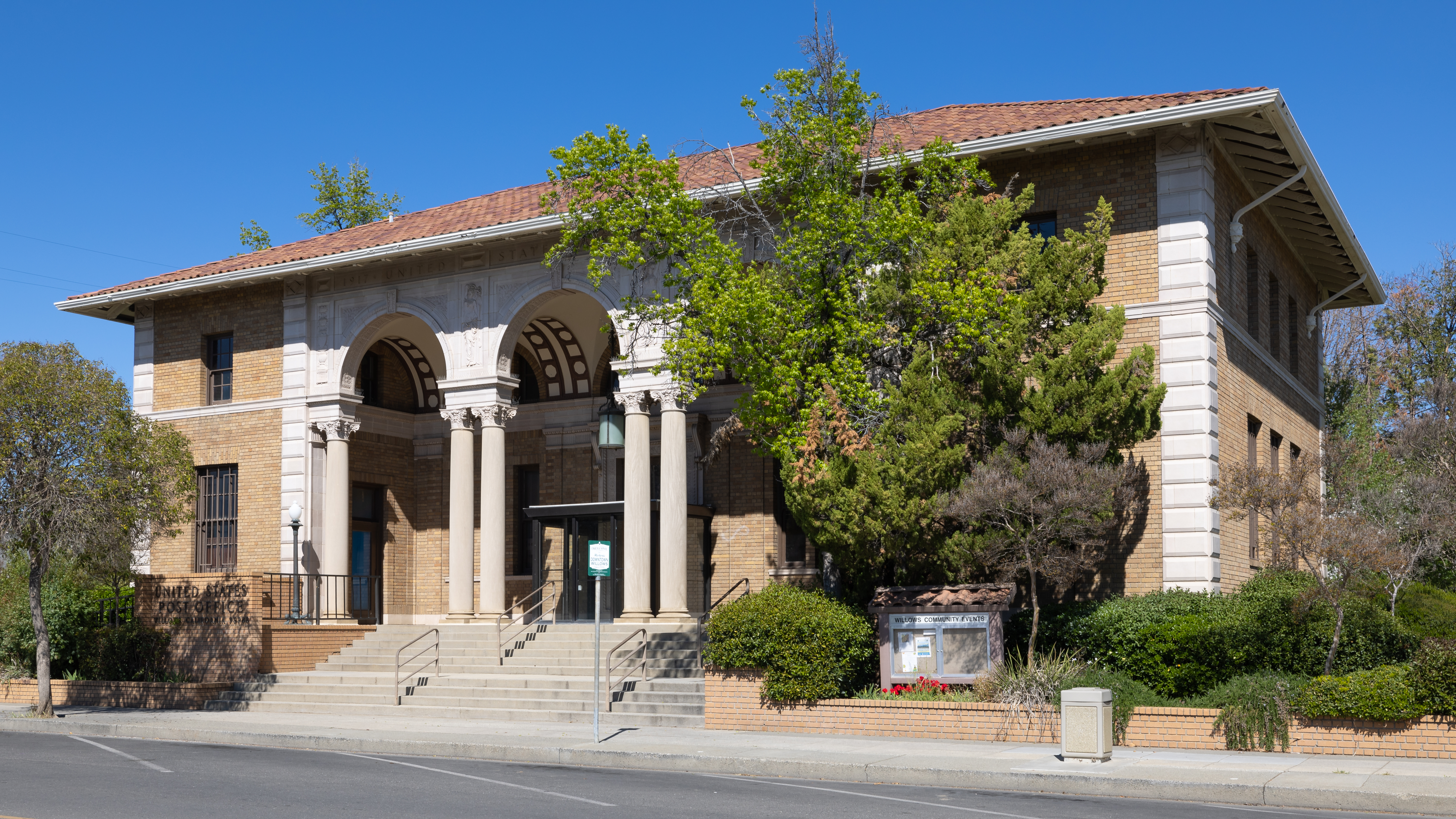
- Willows Main Post Office in March 2022

- Location within California Location within the United States
- Location: 315 W. Sycamore St., Willows, California
- Coordinates: 39°31′14″N 122°12′27″W
- Area: 0.5 acres (0.20 ha)
- Built: 1918
- Architect: Bliss, Walter D.; Faville, William B.
- Architectural style: Beaux-Arts, Italianate
- MPS: US Post Office in California 1900-1941 TR
- NRHP reference No.: 85000124
- Added to NRHP: January 11, 1985

The Willows Main Post Office is the main post office in Willows, California. Built in 1918, the post office was designed by Walter D. Bliss and William B. Faville, architects known for their work in San Francisco. The building was designed in the Italianate and Beaux-Arts styles. The building's roofline and arched arcade entrance with Doric columns were inspired by the Italianate style, while its detail work, including terra cotta reliefs, quoining, and decorative keystones, is Beaux-Arts styled. While many Italianate Beaux-Arts post offices were built in the early 20th century, the Willows post office was one of the few built in California. In addition, it is one of the few ornately designed buildings in Willows and has been called the "most sophisticated and imposing" of those which exist. The post office was added to the National Register of Historic Places as "US Post Office—Willows Main" on January 11, 1985.

== See also ==
- List of United States post offices
