= Bank of California Building (San Francisco) =

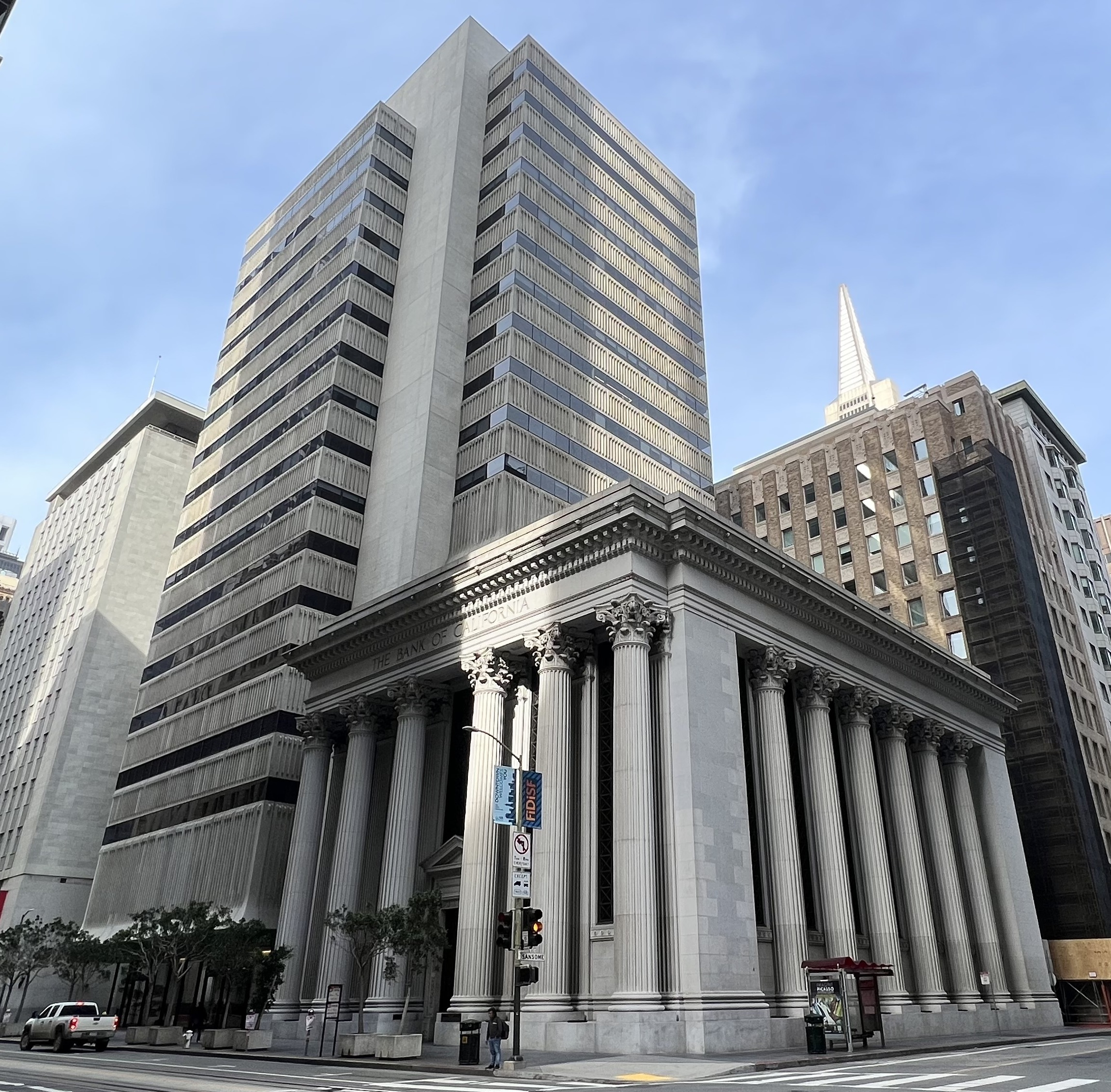
- 1908 structure at right, with 1967 structure behind at left
- Alternative names: 400 California Street; The Grand Old Lady of California Street

General information
- Type: Commercial offices
- Location: 400 California Street; San Francisco, California
- Coordinates: 37.7932°N 122.4016°W
- Completed: 1908 / 1967

Height
- Roof: 312 ft (95 m)

Technical details
- Floor count: 22

Design and construction
- Architects: Walter Danforth Bliss and William Baker Faville / Anshen & Allen

San Francisco Designated Landmark
- Designated: September 3, 1968
- Reference no.: 3

The Bank of California Building is a 1908 Greco-Roman style structure with a brutalist, 312 ft (95 m), 22-story tower annexed in 1967 at 400 California Street in the financial district of San Francisco, California.

Union Bank acquired the building in 1996 as part of its merger with Bank of California. It was one of the first commercial buildings to be completed following the 1906 San Francisco earthquake, leading to a rebirth of the city's financial district. Construction was based on the Knickerbocker Trust Company building in New York City.

== History ==
The Bank of California, a key financial institution in the West, was founded by William Chapman Ralston on July 5, 1864. As the bank rapidly expanded, it soon outgrew its original location. Renowned architects Walter Danforth Bliss and William Baker Faville were commissioned to design a grand new building on the same site.

In January 1906, the bank relocated temporarily to prepare for the construction of its impressive new headquarters. However, progress was abruptly halted by the earthquake and fire on April 18, 1906. Despite the setback, work resumed just six weeks later. The new Bank of California building, fondly known as "The Grand Old Lady of California Street," officially opened on September 8, 1908. It was the first commercial building in the Financial District to emerge from the devastation of the earthquake.

In 1996, the Bank of California merged with Union Bank, forming Union Bank of California, N.A. On September 8, 2008, the historic building was rededicated on its 100th anniversary by Union Bank of California President and CEO Masakki Tanaka, along with San Francisco Mayor Gavin Newsom.

== See also ==
- List of San Francisco Designated Landmarks
- San Francisco's tallest buildings
