= Matson Building =

- Matson Building and Annex
- U.S. National Register of Historic Places
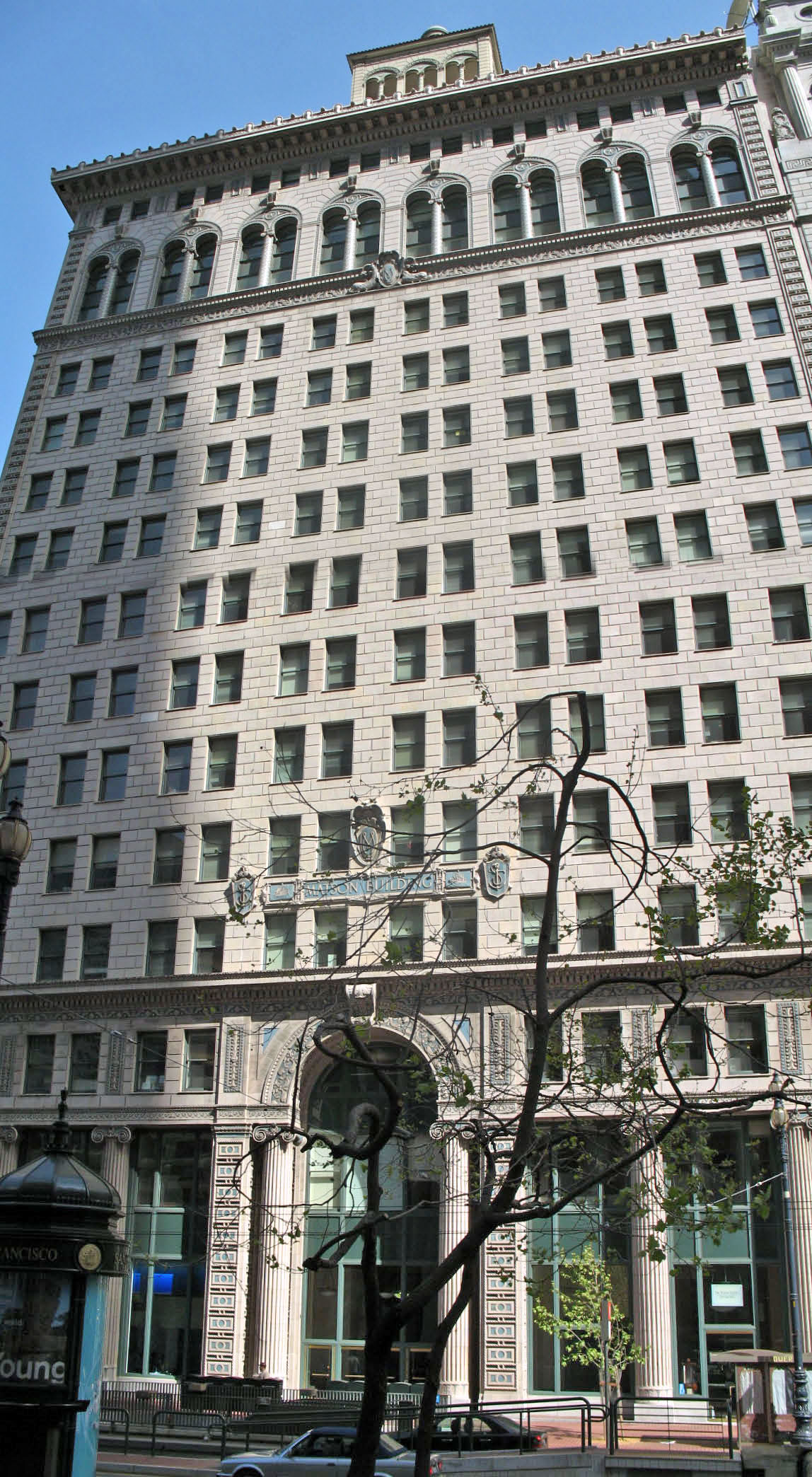

- Location within San Francisco County Location within California Location within the United States
- Location: 215 Market St., San Francisco, California
- Coordinates: 37°47′34″N 122°23′48″W
- Area: less than one acre
- Built: 1924
- Architects: Bliss & Faville
- Architectural style: Renaissance Revival
- NRHP reference No.: 95001384
- Added to NRHP: November 29, 1995

The Matson Building is a historic office building located at 215 Market Street in San Francisco, California.

== Description and history ==
The building was constructed in 1922–1924 to serve as the headquarters of the Matson Navigation Company, then the largest shipping and transportation company between the West Coast and Hawaii.

In addition, the building held mainland offices for three of Hawaii's Big Five corporations and multiple smaller Hawaiian firms, making it a prominent fixture in San Francisco–Hawaii commerce. Architects Bliss & Faville designed the Renaissance Revival building. The sixteen-story building is divided into three sections; the lower and upper sections feature extensive ornamentation, giving the building a column-like appearance. The outside of the building is clad in terra cotta, which is also used for the building's decorative elements. In 1945–1947, a matching annex was placed on the building to provide more space for Matson's offices.

The building was added to the National Register of Historic Places on November 29, 1995.
