= Willows, California =

City in California, United States

- City
- City of Willows
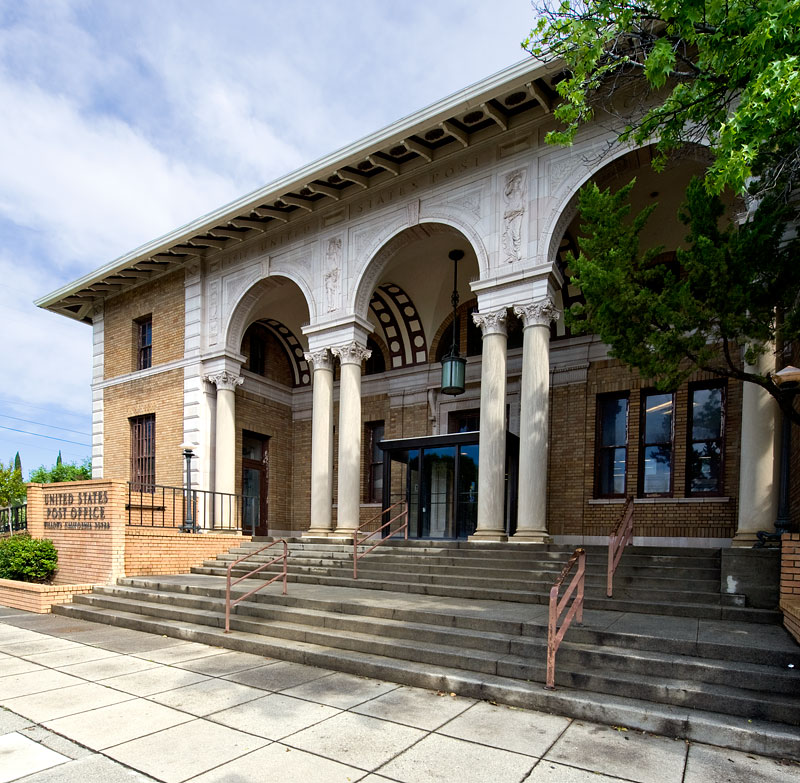
- The historic Willows post office
- Interactive map of Willows, California
- Location within California Location within the United States
- Coordinates: 39°31′28″N 122°11′37″W
- Country: United States
- State: California
- County: Glenn
- Incorporated: January 16, 1886

Area
  - Total: 2.85 sq mi (7.38 km^{2})
  - Land: 2.84 sq mi (7.35 km^{2})
  - Water: 0.012 sq mi (0.03 km^{2}) 0.42%
- Elevation: 138 ft (42 m)

Population (2020)
  - Total: 6,293
  - Density: 2,219/sq mi (856.7/km^{2})
- Time zone: UTC-08:00 (PST)
  - Summer (DST): UTC-07:00 (PDT)
- ZIP code: 95988
- Area codes: 530, 837
- FIPS code: 06-85684
- GNIS feature IDs: 1660184, 2412272
- Website: cityofwillows.org

Willows is a city in and the county seat of Glenn County, California, United States, located in the Sacramento Valley region of Northern California. The city is home to regional government offices, including the California Highway Patrol, the California Department of Motor Vehicles, the United States Bureau of Reclamation and the main offices of the Mendocino National Forest, which comprises about one million acres (404,686 ha) of Federal land located mostly in mountainous terrain west of Willows. The population was 6,293 at the 2020 census.

== History ==
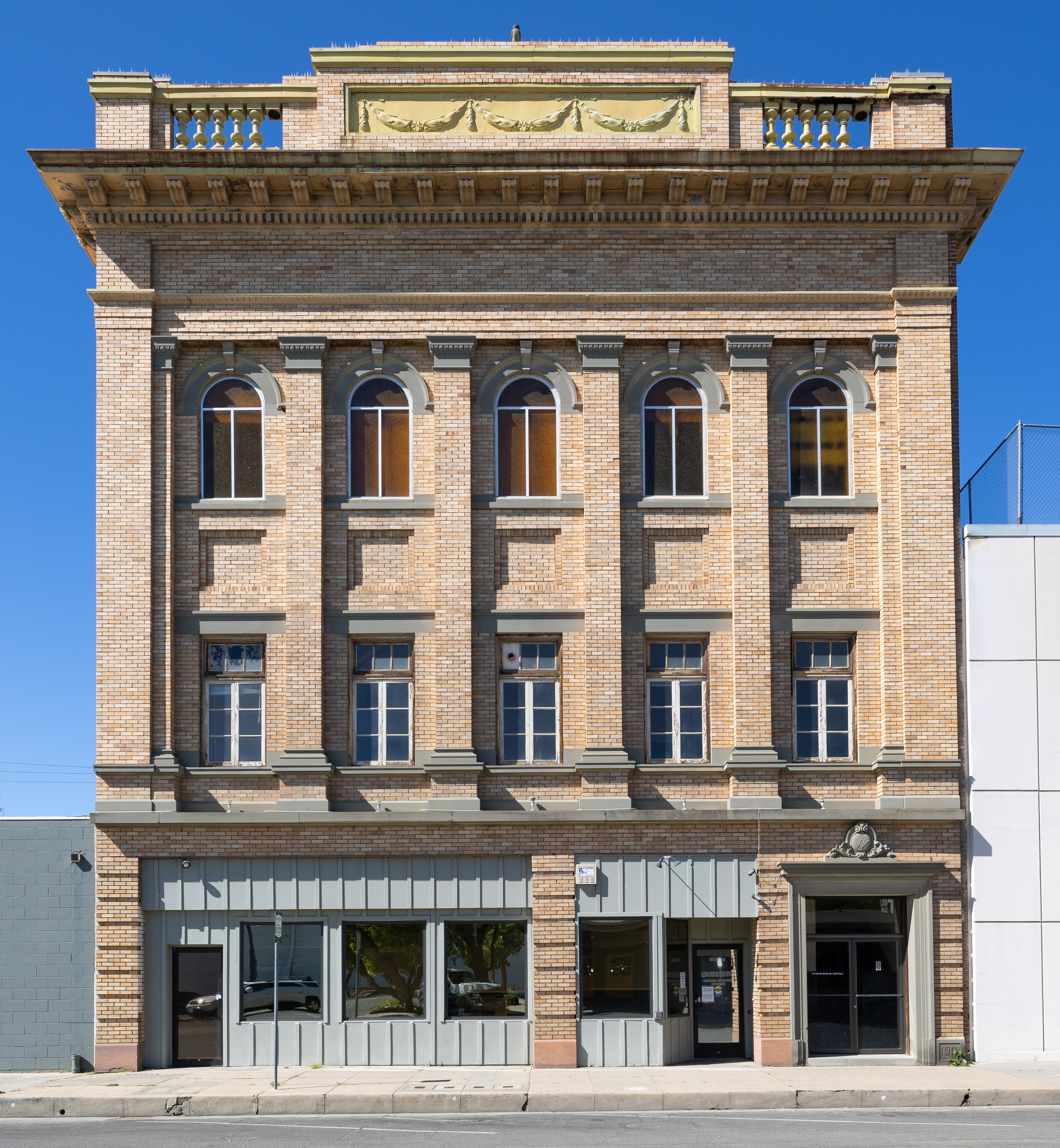
The historic Willows Masonic Lodge.

The Willow post office opened in 1862; the name was changed to Willows in 1916. The current post office building, which was built in 1918, is listed on the National Register of Historic Places. The Willows Auxiliary Field (1942–1945) was used for training World War II pilots.

== Geography ==
According to the United States Census Bureau, the city has a total area of 2.8 square miles (7.3 km^{2}), of which 2.8 square miles (7.3 km^{2}) is land and 0.01 square miles (0.026 km^{2}) (0.42%) is water.

=== Climate ===
Willows has a Hot-summer Mediterranean climate (Csa) according to the Köppen climate classification system.

Climate data for Willows, California, 1991–2020 normals, extremes 1906–present
| Month | Jan | Feb | Mar | Apr | May | Jun | Jul | Aug | Sep | Oct | Nov | Dec | Year |
|---|---|---|---|---|---|---|---|---|---|---|---|---|---|
| Record high °F (°C) | 83 (28) | 83 (28) | 88 (31) | 101 (38) | 109 (43) | 113 (45) | 117 (47) | 115 (46) | 115 (46) | 105 (41) | 92 (33) | 81 (27) | 117 (47) |
| Mean maximum °F (°C) | 70.5 (21.4) | 73.8 (23.2) | 80.2 (26.8) | 89.0 (31.7) | 96.4 (35.8) | 104.0 (40.0) | 105.1 (40.6) | 102.9 (39.4) | 102.3 (39.1) | 94.1 (34.5) | 80.5 (26.9) | 68.8 (20.4) | 107.6 (42.0) |
| Mean daily maximum °F (°C) | 58.4 (14.7) | 62.8 (17.1) | 67.9 (19.9) | 74.7 (23.7) | 82.5 (28.1) | 90.2 (32.3) | 94.8 (34.9) | 93.6 (34.2) | 91.0 (32.8) | 81.6 (27.6) | 67.3 (19.6) | 58.4 (14.7) | 76.9 (25.0) |
| Daily mean °F (°C) | 49.2 (9.6) | 52.3 (11.3) | 56.0 (13.3) | 61.0 (16.1) | 68.2 (20.1) | 75.1 (23.9) | 78.8 (26.0) | 77.5 (25.3) | 74.7 (23.7) | 67.1 (19.5) | 55.6 (13.1) | 48.7 (9.3) | 63.7 (17.6) |
| Mean daily minimum °F (°C) | 40.0 (4.4) | 41.9 (5.5) | 44.1 (6.7) | 47.3 (8.5) | 54.0 (12.2) | 60.1 (15.6) | 62.9 (17.2) | 61.3 (16.3) | 58.4 (14.7) | 52.6 (11.4) | 43.9 (6.6) | 39.0 (3.9) | 50.5 (10.3) |
| Mean minimum °F (°C) | 28.2 (−2.1) | 30.4 (−0.9) | 32.0 (0.0) | 33.8 (1.0) | 41.0 (5.0) | 47.4 (8.6) | 52.6 (11.4) | 51.5 (10.8) | 46.6 (8.1) | 40.7 (4.8) | 31.5 (−0.3) | 26.6 (−3.0) | 24.8 (−4.0) |
| Record low °F (°C) | 15 (−9) | 21 (−6) | 21 (−6) | 22 (−6) | 29 (−2) | 38 (3) | 43 (6) | 42 (6) | 37 (3) | 30 (−1) | 22 (−6) | 11 (−12) | 11 (−12) |
| Average precipitation inches (mm) | 4.40 (112) | 4.19 (106) | 2.77 (70) | 1.53 (39) | 1.20 (30) | 0.46 (12) | 0.03 (0.76) | 0.07 (1.8) | 0.22 (5.6) | 1.08 (27) | 2.35 (60) | 3.58 (91) | 21.88 (555.16) |
| Average precipitation days (≥ 0.01 in) | 9.2 | 8.3 | 8.5 | 4.3 | 3.7 | 1.6 | 0.1 | 0.3 | 1.0 | 3.1 | 4.2 | 5.9 | 50.2 |
Source 1: NOAA
Source 2: National Weather Service

== Demographics ==
Historical population
| Census | Pop. | Note | %± |
|---|---|---|---|
| 1880 | 728 | | — |
| 1890 | 1,176 | | 61.5% |
| 1900 | 893 | | −24.1% |
| 1910 | 1,139 | | 27.5% |
| 1920 | 2,190 | | 92.3% |
| 1930 | 2,024 | | −7.6% |
| 1940 | 2,215 | | 9.4% |
| 1950 | 3,019 | | 36.3% |
| 1960 | 4,139 | | 37.1% |
| 1970 | 4,085 | | −1.3% |
| 1980 | 4,777 | | 16.9% |
| 1990 | 5,988 | | 25.4% |
| 2000 | 6,220 | | 3.9% |
| 2010 | 6,166 | | −0.9% |
| 2020 | 6,293 | | 2.1% |
U.S. Decennial Census

=== 2020 census ===
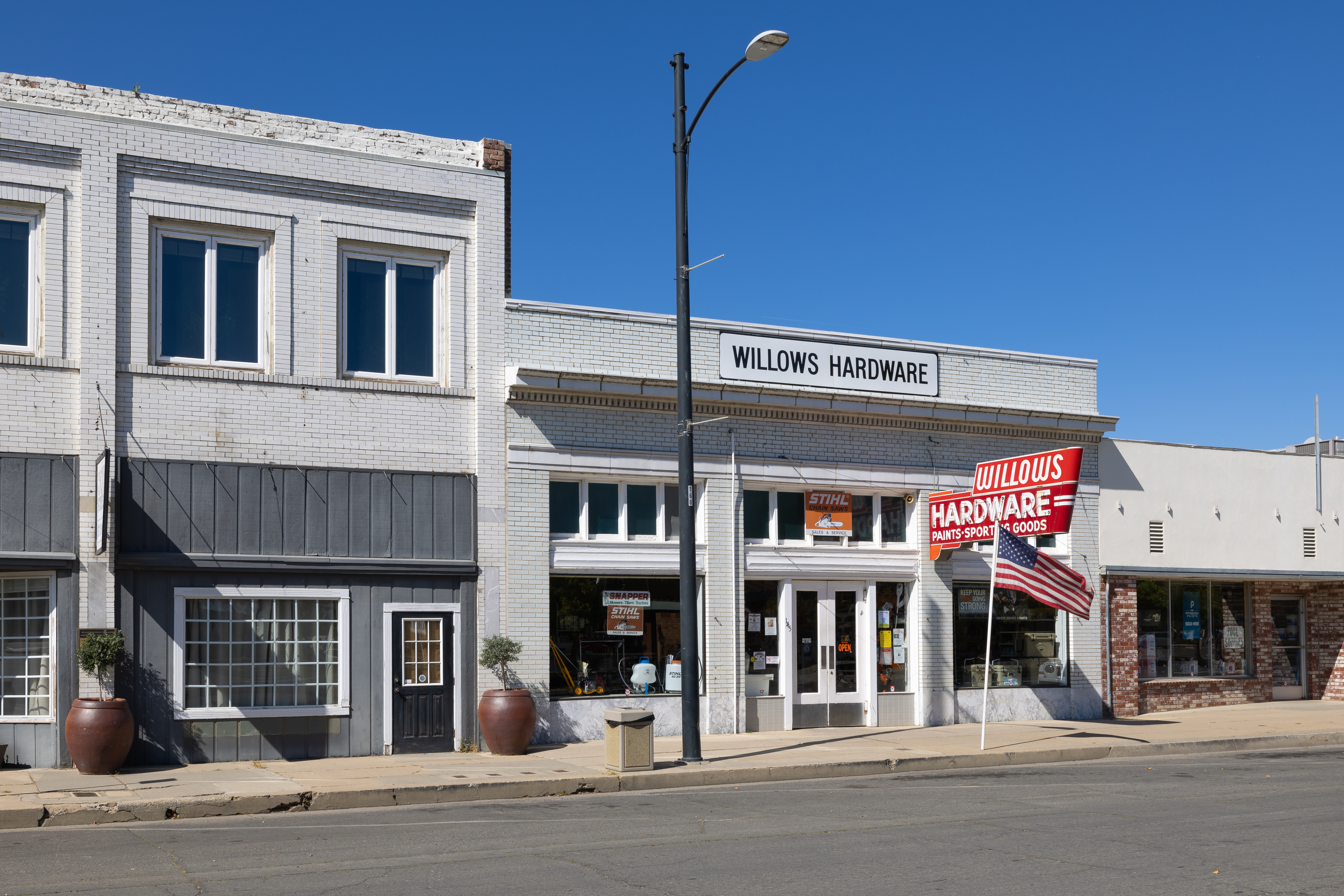
Downtown Willows.

As of the 2020 census, Willows had a population of 6,293 and a population density of 2,219.0 inhabitants per square mile (856.8/km^{2}). Racial and ethnic composition data is shown in the table below.

The census reported that 98.1% of the population lived in households and 1.9% were institutionalized, while 99.4% of residents lived in urban areas and 0.6% lived in rural areas.

There were 2,316 households, of which 36.6% had children under the age of 18 living in them. Of all households, 45.5% were married-couple households, 9.2% were cohabiting couple households, 17.7% were households with a male householder and no spouse or partner present, and 27.7% were households with a female householder and no spouse or partner present. About 26.9% of all households were made up of individuals, and 12.5% had someone living alone who was 65 years of age or older. The average household size was 2.67. There were 1,540 families (66.5% of all households).

The age distribution was 26.0% under the age of 18, 7.9% aged 18 to 24, 26.8% aged 25 to 44, 22.5% aged 45 to 64, and 16.7% who were 65 years of age or older. The median age was 35.8 years. For every 100 females, there were 98.2 males, and for every 100 females age 18 and over there were 95.1 males age 18 and over.

There were 2,460 housing units at an average density of 867.4 units per square mile (334.9 units/km^{2}), of which 2,316 (94.1%) were occupied. Of these occupied units, 51.3% were owner-occupied and 48.7% were occupied by renters. The homeowner vacancy rate was 1.2%, the rental vacancy rate was 3.7%, and 5.9% of housing units were vacant.

Racial composition as of the 2020 census
| Race | Number | Percent |
|---|---|---|
| White | 3,617 | 57.5% |
| Black or African American | 46 | 0.7% |
| American Indian and Alaska Native | 290 | 4.6% |
| Asian | 279 | 4.4% |
| Native Hawaiian and Other Pacific Islander | 7 | 0.1% |
| Some other race | 1,303 | 20.7% |
| Two or more races | 751 | 11.9% |
| Hispanic or Latino (of any race) | 2,330 | 37.0% |

=== Income and poverty ===
In 2023, the US Census Bureau estimated that the median household income was $78,179, and the per capita income was $32,606. About 11.6% of families and 15.3% of the population were below the poverty line.

=== 2010 census ===
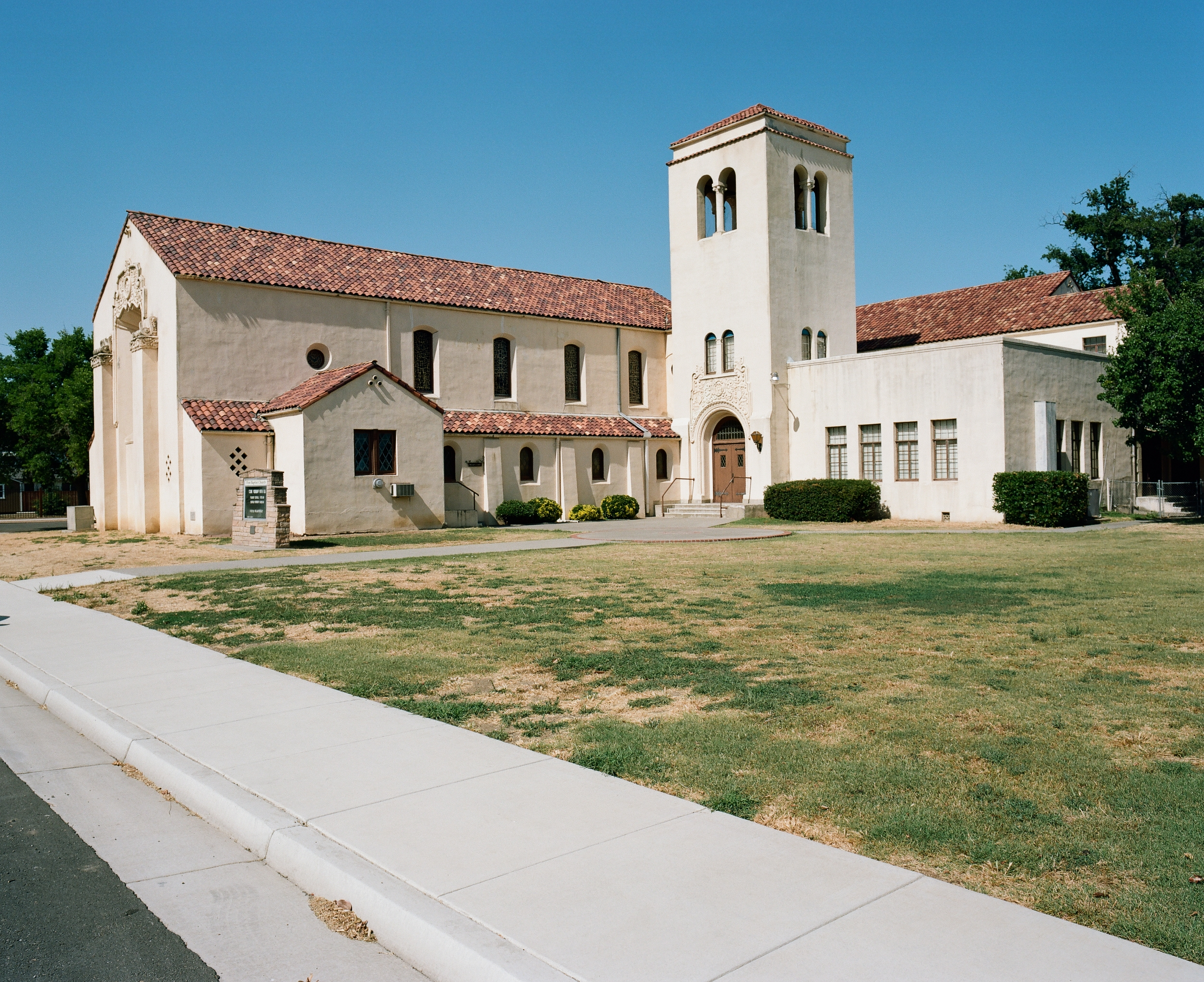
The Spanish Colonial Revival style First United Methodist Church.

At the 2010 census Willows had a population of 6,166. The population density was 2,146.2 inhabitants per square mile (828.7/km^{2}). The racial makeup of Willows was 4,304 (69.8%) White, 78 (1.3%) African American, 138 (2.2%) Native American, 312 (5.1%) Asian, 11 (0.2%) Pacific Islander, 1,099 (17.8%) from other races, and 224 (3.6%) from two or more races. Hispanic or Latino of any race were 2,020 persons (32.8%).

The census reported that 5,976 people (96.9% of the population) lived in households, 20 (0.3%) lived in non-institutionalized group quarters, and 170 (2.8%) were institutionalized.

There were 2,173 households, 839 (38.6%) had children under the age of 18 living in them, 1,037 (47.7%) were opposite-sex married couples living together, 327 (15.0%) had a female householder with no husband present, 133 (6.1%) had a male householder with no wife present. There were 225 (10.4%) unmarried opposite-sex partnerships, and 7 (0.3%) same-sex married couples or partnerships. 538 households (24.8%) were one person and 228 (10.5%) had someone living alone who was 65 or older. The average household size was 2.75. There were 1,497 families (68.9% of households); the average family size was 3.28.

The age distribution was 1,783 people (28.9%) under the age of 18, 614 people (10.0%) aged 18 to 24, 1,542 people (25.0%) aged 25 to 44, 1,445 people (23.4%) aged 45 to 64, and 782 people (12.7%) who were 65 or older. The median age was 32.6 years. For every 100 females, there were 97.4 males. For every 100 females age 18 and over, there were 94.5 males.

There were 2,399 housing units at an average density of 835.0 units per square mile (322.4 units/km^{2}), of which 2,173 were occupied, 1,148 (52.8%) by the owners and 1,025 (47.2%) by renters. The homeowner vacancy rate was 2.3%; the rental vacancy rate was 8.8%. 3,137 people (50.9% of the population) lived in owner-occupied housing units and 2,839 people (46.0%) lived in rental housing units.

== Politics ==
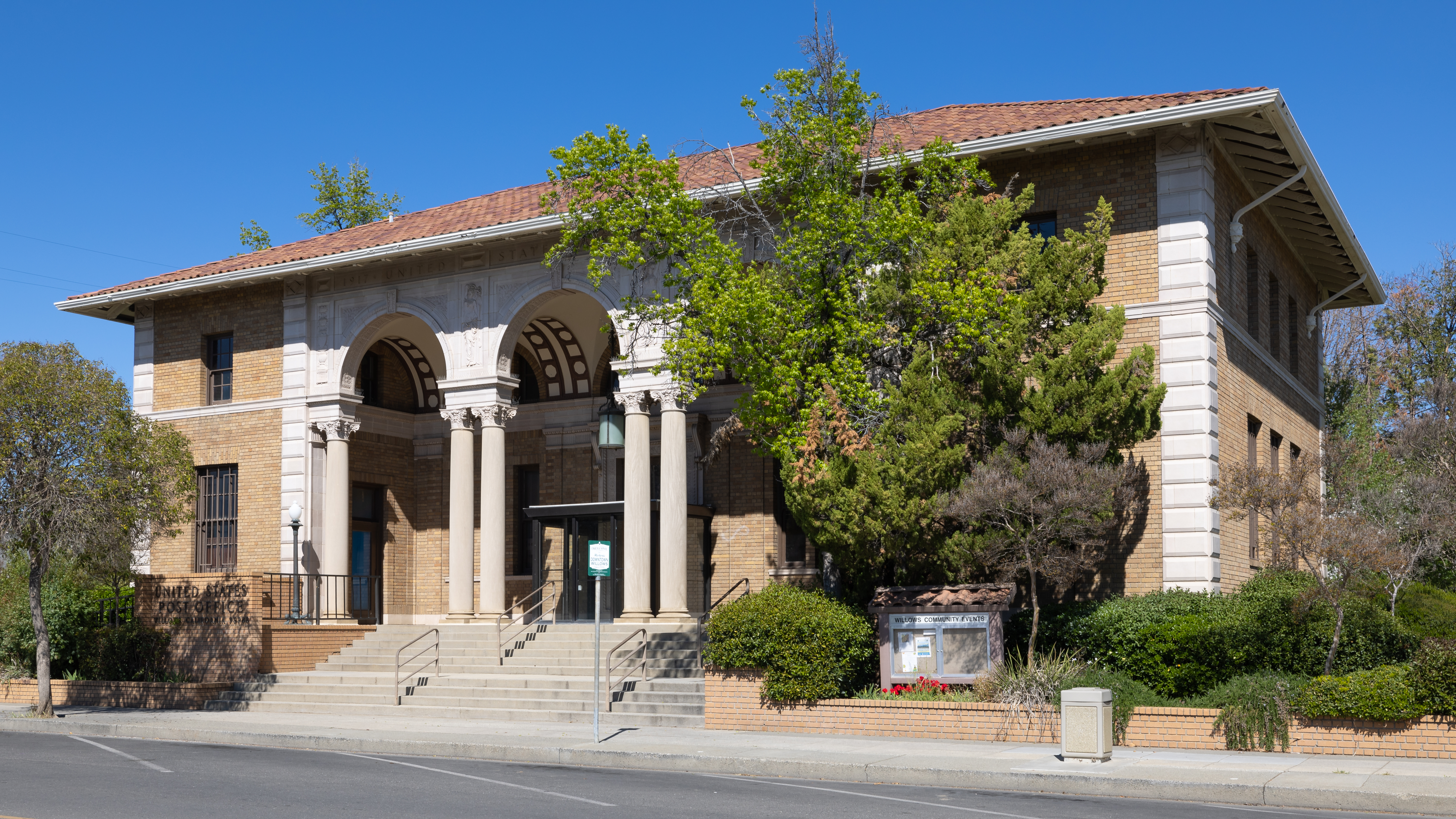
The historic Willows Post Office.

In the state legislature, Willows is in the 1st senatorial district, represented by Republican Megan Dahle, and in the 3rd Assembly district, represented by Vacant.

Federally, Willows is in California's 1st congressional district, represented by Republican James Gallagher.

== Education ==
Willows is served by the Willows Unified School District.

== Notable people ==
- Ace Adams, born in Willows, former major league baseball All-Star
- Mark Koenig, baseball player for championship New York Yankees teams, died in Willows
- Ron Ponciano, former college football coach
