= List of 2024 motorsport champions =

2024 motorsport champions
Previous: 2023	Next: 2025

This list of 2024 motorsport champions is a list of national or international motorsport series with championships decided by the points or positions earned by a driver from multiple races where the season was completed during the 2024 calendar year.

== Dirt oval racing ==
Series	Champion	Refer
Lucas Oil Late Model Dirt Series	(United States) Ricky Thornton Jr.	
World of Outlaws Late Model Series	(United States) Brandon Sheppard	
World of Outlaws Late Model Series	Teams: (United States) Bobby Pierce Racing	
World of Outlaws Sprint Car Series	(United States) David Gravel	
World of Outlaws Sprint Car Series	Teams: (United States) Big Game Motorsports	

== Drag racing ==
Series	Champion	Refer
NHRA Mission Foods Drag Racing Series	Top Fuel: (United States) Antron Brown	2024 NHRA Mission Foods Drag Racing Series
NHRA Mission Foods Drag Racing Series	Funny Car: (United States) Austin Prock	2024 NHRA Mission Foods Drag Racing Series
NHRA Mission Foods Drag Racing Series	Pro Stock: (United States) Greg Anderson	2024 NHRA Mission Foods Drag Racing Series
NHRA Mission Foods Drag Racing Series	Pro Stock Motorcycle: (United States) Gaige Herrera	2024 NHRA Mission Foods Drag Racing Series
European Drag Racing Championship	Top Fuel: (Switzerland) Jndia Erbacher	
European Drag Racing Championship	Top Methanol: (Sweden) Jonny Lagg	
European Drag Racing Championship	Pro Stock Car: (Sweden) Jimmy Alund	
European Drag Racing Championship	Pro Stock Modified: (Finland) Jere Rantaniemi	

== Drifting ==
Series	Champion	Refer
D1 Grand Prix	(Japan) Naoki Nakamura	2024 D1 Grand Prix series
D1 Grand Prix	D1 Lights: (Japan) Kenshiro Wada	2024 D1 Grand Prix series
D1NZ	(New Zealand) Kase Pullen-Burry	2024 D1NZ season
D1NZ	Pro-Sport: (New Zealand) Keisuke Nagashima	2024 D1NZ season
Drift Masters	(Finland) Lauri Heinonen	2024 Drift Masters season
Drift Masters	Nations Cup: (Republic of Ireland) Ireland	2024 Drift Masters season
Formula D	PRO: (Republic of Ireland) James Deane	2024 Formula Drift season
Formula D	PROSPEC: (Canada) Tommy Lemaire	2024 Formula Drift season
Formula D	Auto Cup: (Japan) Toyota	2024 Formula Drift season
Formula D	Tires: (Japan) Nitto	2024 Formula Drift season

== Kart racing ==
Series	Champion	Refer
FIA Karting World Championship	OK: (United Kingdom) Ethan Jeff-Hall	2024 Karting World Championship
FIA Karting World Championship	KZ: (Italy) Giuseppe Palomba	2024 Karting World Championship
FIA Karting World Championship	OK-J: (United Kingdom) Kenzo Craigie	2024 Karting World Championship
FIA Karting World Championship	KZ2: (Italy) Cristian Bertuca	2024 Karting World Championship
FIA Karting World Championship	OK-N: (South Korea) Kyuho Lee	2024 Karting World Championship
FIA Karting World Championship	KZ2-M: (France) Anthony Abbasse	2024 Karting World Championship
FIA Karting European Championship	OK: (United Kingdom) Joe Turney	2024 Karting European Championship
FIA Karting European Championship	KZ: (Italy) Lorenzo Travisanutto	2024 Karting European Championship
FIA Karting European Championship	OK-J: (Belgium) Dries Van Langendonck	2024 Karting European Championship
FIA Karting European Championship	KZ2: (France) Matteo Spirgel	2024 Karting European Championship
FIA Karting European Championship	KZ2-M: (Italy) Riccardo Nalon	2024 Karting European Championship
FIA Karting Academy Trophy	(Belgium) Gilles Herman	2024 Karting Academy Trophy
WSK Champions Cup	KZ2: (Estonia) Markus Kajak	2024 WSK Champions Cup
WSK Champions Cup	OKJ: (Austria) Niklas Schaufler	2024 WSK Champions Cup
WSK Euro Series	OK: (Sweden) Scott Lindblom	2024 WSK Euro Series
WSK Euro Series	OKJ: (United States) Jack Iliffe	2024 WSK Euro Series
WSK Euro Series	MINI Gr.3: (Spain) Daniel Miron Lorente	2024 WSK Euro Series
Rotax Max Challenge	DD2: (Slovenia) Xen De Ruwe	2024 Rotax Max Challenge
Rotax Max Challenge	DD2 Masters: (France) Nicolas Picot	2024 Rotax Max Challenge
Rotax Max Challenge	Senior: (Belgium) Vic Stevens	2024 Rotax Max Challenge
Rotax Max Challenge	Junior: (United Kingdom) Jacob Ashcroft	2024 Rotax Max Challenge
Rotax Max Challenge	Mini: (Czech Republic) Zdenek Babicek	2024 Rotax Max Challenge
Rotax Max Challenge	Micro: (United Kingdom) Joshua Cooke	2024 Rotax Max Challenge
Rotax Max Challenge	Nations Cup: (United Kingdom) Great Britain	2024 Rotax Max Challenge

== Motorcycle racing ==
Series	Champion	Refer
FIM MotoGP World Championship	(Spain) Jorge Martín	2024 MotoGP World Championship
FIM MotoGP World Championship	Teams: (Italy) Ducati Lenovo Team	2024 MotoGP World Championship
FIM MotoGP World Championship	Constructors: (Italy) Ducati	2024 MotoGP World Championship
FIM Moto2 World Championship	(Japan) Ai Ogura	2024 Moto2 World Championship
FIM Moto2 World Championship	Teams: (Spain) MT Helmets – MSi	2024 Moto2 World Championship
FIM Moto2 World Championship	Constructors: (Germany) Kalex	2024 Moto2 World Championship
FIM Moto3 World Championship	(Colombia) David Alonso	2024 Moto3 World Championship
FIM Moto3 World Championship	Teams: (Spain) CFMoto Aspar Team	2024 Moto3 World Championship
FIM Moto3 World Championship	Constructors: (China) CFMoto	2024 Moto3 World Championship
MotoE World Championship	(Spain) Héctor Garzó	2024 MotoE World Championship
MotoE World Championship	Teams: (Germany) Dynavolt Intact GP MotoE	2024 MotoE World Championship
FIM Women's Circuit Racing World Championship	(Spain) Ana Carrasco	2024 FIM Women's Circuit Racing World Championship
FIM JuniorGP World Championship	(Spain) Álvaro Carpe	2024 FIM JuniorGP World Championship
FIM JuniorGP World Championship	Constructors: (Austria) KTM	2024 FIM JuniorGP World Championship
FIM Moto2 European Championship	(Spain) Roberto García	2024 FIM Moto2 European Championship
FIM Moto2 European Championship	Constructors: (Germany) Kalex	2024 FIM Moto2 European Championship
FIM Stock European Championship	(Spain) Mario Mayor	2024 FIM Stock European Championship
Asia Road Racing Championship	ASB1000: (Japan) Yuki Kunii	2024 Asia Road Racing Championship
Asia Road Racing Championship	ASS600: (Thailand) Apiwat Wongthananon	2024 Asia Road Racing Championship
Asia Road Racing Championship	ASS250: (Indonesia) Kiandra Ramadhipa	2024 Asia Road Racing Championship
Asia Road Racing Championship	UB150: (Malaysia) Akid Aziz	2024 Asia Road Racing Championship
Asia Road Racing Championship	TVS Asia: (Japan) Hiroki Ono	2024 Asia Road Racing Championship
Asia Talent Cup	(Japan) Zen Mitani	2024 Asia Talent Cup
British Superbike Championship	(United Kingdom) Kyle Ryde	2024 British Superbike Championship
European Talent Cup	(Spain) Carlos Cano	2024 European Talent Cup
MotoAmerica	(United States) Josh Herrin	2024 MotoAmerica Superbike Championship
MotoAmerica	Superbike Cup: (United States) Ashton Yates	2024 MotoAmerica Superbike Championship
MotoAmerica	Supersport: (United States) Mathew Scholtz	2024 MotoAmerica Superbike Championship
MotoAmerica	Junior Cup: (United States) Matthew Chapin	2024 MotoAmerica Superbike Championship
Red Bull MotoGP Rookies Cup	(Spain) Álvaro Carpe	2024 Red Bull MotoGP Rookies Cup
Superbike World Championship	(Turkey) Toprak Razgatlıoğlu	2024 Superbike World Championship
Superbike World Championship	Teams: (Italy) Aruba.it Racing - Ducati	2024 Superbike World Championship
Superbike World Championship	Manufacturers: (Italy) Ducati	2024 Superbike World Championship
Supersport World Championship	(Spain) Adrián Huertas	2024 Supersport World Championship
Supersport World Championship	Teams: (Netherlands) Ten Kate Racing Yamaha	2024 Supersport World Championship
Supersport World Championship	Manufacturers: (Italy) Ducati	2024 Supersport World Championship
Supersport 300 World Championship	(Indonesia) Aldi Satya Mahendra	2024 Supersport 300 World Championship
Supersport 300 World Championship	Teams: (Belgium) MTM Kawasaki	2024 Supersport 300 World Championship
Supersport 300 World Championship	Manufacturers: (Japan) Kawasaki	2024 Supersport 300 World Championship

=== Motocross ===
Series	Champion	Refer
FIM Motocross World Championship	(Spain) Jorge Prado	2024 FIM Motocross World Championship
FIM Motocross World Championship	Manufacturers: (Japan) Honda	2024 FIM Motocross World Championship
FIM Motocross World Championship	MX2: (Netherlands) Kay de Wolf	2024 FIM Motocross World Championship
FIM Motocross World Championship	MX2 Manufacturers: (Sweden) Husqvarna	2024 FIM Motocross World Championship
FIM Women's Motocross World Championship	(Netherlands) Lotte van Drunen	2024 FIM Women's Motocross World Championship
FIM Women's Motocross World Championship	Manufacturers: (Japan) Yamaha	2024 FIM Women's Motocross World Championship
FIM Enduro World Championship	EnduroGP: (Spain) Josep García	2024 FIM Enduro World Championship
FIM Enduro World Championship	EnduroGP Manufacturers: (Austria) KTM	2024 FIM Enduro World Championship
FIM Enduro World Championship	Enduro 1: (Spain) Josep García	2024 FIM Enduro World Championship
FIM Enduro World Championship	Enduro 1 Manufacturers: (Austria) KTM	2024 FIM Enduro World Championship
FIM Enduro World Championship	Enduro 2: (Italy) Andrea Verona	2024 FIM Enduro World Championship
FIM Enduro World Championship	Enduro 2 Manufacturers: (Spain) Gas Gas	2024 FIM Enduro World Championship
FIM Enduro World Championship	Enduro 3: (United Kingdom) Brad Freeman	2024 FIM Enduro World Championship
FIM Enduro World Championship	Enduro 3 Manufacturers: (Italy) Beta	2024 FIM Enduro World Championship
FIM Enduro World Championship	Junior: (Sweden) Max Ahlin	2024 FIM Enduro World Championship
FIM Enduro World Championship	Junior 1: (Italy) Kevin Cristino	2024 FIM Enduro World Championship
FIM Enduro World Championship	Junior 2: (Sweden) Max Ahlin	2024 FIM Enduro World Championship
FIM Enduro World Championship	Youth: (Italy) Manuel Verzeroli	2024 FIM Enduro World Championship
FIM Enduro World Championship	Women: (Spain) Mireia Badia	2024 FIM Enduro World Championship
FIM Enduro World Championship	Open 2-stroke: (Belgium) Tim Louis	2024 FIM Enduro World Championship
FIM Enduro World Championship	Open 4-stroke: (United Kingdom) Alfie Webb	2024 FIM Enduro World Championship
AMA National Motocross Championship	450cc: (United States) Chase Sexton	2024 AMA National Motocross Championship
AMA National Motocross Championship	250cc: (United States) Haiden Deegan	2024 AMA National Motocross Championship
AMA Supercross Championship	450 SX: (Australia) Jett Lawrence	2024 AMA Supercross Championship
AMA Supercross Championship	250 SX West: (United States) RJ Hampshire	2024 AMA Supercross Championship
AMA Supercross Championship	250 SX East: (France) Tom Vialle	2024 AMA Supercross Championship
British Motocross Championship	MX1: (Netherlands) Jeffrey Herlings	2024 British Motocross Championship
British Motocross Championship	MX2: (Netherlands) Cas Valk	2024 British Motocross Championship
European Motocross Championship	EMX250: (France) Mathis Valin	2024 European Motocross Championship
European Motocross Championship	EMX250 Manufacturers: (Japan) Kawasaki	2024 European Motocross Championship
European Motocross Championship	EMX125: (Hungary) Noel Zanócz	2024 European Motocross Championship
European Motocross Championship	EMX125 Manufacturers: (Italy) Fantic	2024 European Motocross Championship
European Motocross Championship	EMXOpen: (Czech Republic) Jakub Terešák	2024 European Motocross Championship
European Motocross Championship	EMXOpen Manufacturers: (Austria) KTM	2024 European Motocross Championship
European Motocross Championship	EMX2T: (Austria) Marcel Stauffer	2024 European Motocross Championship
European Motocross Championship	EMX2T Manufacturers: (Austria) KTM	2024 European Motocross Championship
European Motocross Championship	EMX85: (France) Sleny Goyer	2024 European Motocross Championship
European Motocross Championship	EMX85 Manufacturers: (Spain) Gas Gas	2024 European Motocross Championship
European Motocross Championship	EMX65: (Croatia) Roko Ivandić	2024 European Motocross Championship
European Motocross Championship	EMX65 Manufacturers: (Austria) KTM	2024 European Motocross Championship
French Elite Motocross Championship	Elite MX1: (France) Maxime Desprey	2024 French Elite Motocross Championship
French Elite Motocross Championship	Elite MX2: (France) Mathis Valin	2024 French Elite Motocross Championship
Italian Prestige Motocross Championship	MX1: (Italy) Alessandro Lupino	2024 Italian Prestige Motocross Championship
Italian Prestige Motocross Championship	MX2: (Italy) Valerio Lata	2024 Italian Prestige Motocross Championship
New Zealand Motocross Championship	MX1: (New Zealand) Hamish Harwood	2024 New Zealand Motocross Championship
New Zealand Motocross Championship	MX2: (New Zealand) James Scott	2024 New Zealand Motocross Championship
ProMX	MX1: (Australia) Kyle Webster	2024 ProMX Championship
ProMX	MX2: (New Zealand) Brodie Connolly	2024 ProMX Championship
ProMX	MX3: (Australia) Jake Cannon	2024 ProMX Championship
ProMX	MXW: (Australia) Charli Cannon	2024 ProMX Championship
Spanish Motocross Championship	Elite-MX1: (Spain) José Butrón	2024 Spanish Motocross Championship
Spanish Motocross Championship	Elite-MX2: (Spain) Gerard Congost	2024 Spanish Motocross Championship
SuperMotocross World Championship	450SMX: (Australia) Jett Lawrence	2024 SuperMotocross World Championship
SuperMotocross World Championship	250SMX: (United States) Haiden Deegan	2024 SuperMotocross World Championship

== Open wheel racing ==
Series	Champion	Refer
FIA Formula One World Championship	(Netherlands) Max Verstappen	2024 Formula One World Championship
FIA Formula One World Championship	Constructors: (United Kingdom) McLaren-Mercedes	2024 Formula One World Championship
FIA Formula 2 Championship	(Brazil) Gabriel Bortoleto	2024 Formula 2 Championship
FIA Formula 2 Championship	Teams: (United Kingdom) Invicta Racing	2024 Formula 2 Championship
FIA Formula E World Championship	(Germany) Pascal Wehrlein	2023–24 Formula E World Championship
FIA Formula E World Championship	Teams: (United Kingdom) Jaguar Racing	2023–24 Formula E World Championship
FIA Formula E World Championship	Manufacturers: (Germany) Porsche	2023–24 Formula E World Championship
IndyCar Series	(Spain) Álex Palou	2024 IndyCar Series
IndyCar Series	Manufacturers: (United States) Chevrolet	2024 IndyCar Series
IndyCar Series	Rookies: (Sweden) Linus Lundqvist	2024 IndyCar Series
Indy NXT	(United Kingdom) Louis Foster	2024 Indy NXT
Indy NXT	Teams: (United States) Andretti Global	2024 Indy NXT
Indy NXT	Rookies: (Brazil) Caio Collet	2024 Indy NXT
Atlantic Championship	016 Class: (United States) Matthew Butson	2024 Atlantic Championship
Atlantic Championship	Open Class: (United States) Nathan Byrd	2024 Atlantic Championship
F2000 Italian Formula Trophy	(Hungary) Benjámin Berta	2024 F2000 Italian Formula Trophy
F2000 Italian Formula Trophy	F2000 Teams: (Austria) Franz Wöss Racing	2024 F2000 Italian Formula Trophy
F2000 Italian Formula Trophy	F2.0 Cup: (Turkey) Emir Tanju	2024 F2000 Italian Formula Trophy
F2000 Italian Formula Trophy	F2.0 Cup Teams: (Italy) Viola Formula Racing	2024 F2000 Italian Formula Trophy
Formula Car Challenge	(United States) Christian Okpysh	2024 Formula Car Challenge
Fórmula 2 Argentina	(Argentina) Nicolás Suárez	2024 Fórmula 2 Argentina
Fórmula 2 Argentina	Teams: (Argentina) Martínez Competición	2024 Fórmula 2 Argentina
Fórmula Nacional Argentina	(Argentina) Santiago Chiarello	2024 Fórmula Nacional Argentina
Fórmula Nacional Argentina	Teams: (Argentina) MG Competición	2024 Fórmula Nacional Argentina
Formula Nordic	(Sweden) Daniel Varverud	2024 Formula Nordic
Formula Pro USA Western Championship	FPUSA-3: (United States) Landan Matriano Lim	2024 Formula Pro USA Western Championship
Formula Pro USA Western Championship	FPUSA-4: (United States) Valentino Garbarino	2024 Formula Pro USA Western Championship
MRF Formula 2000	(India) Jaden Pariat	2024 MRF Formula 2000 season
Super Formula Championship	(Japan) Sho Tsuboi	2024 Super Formula Championship
Super Formula Championship	Teams: (Japan) Docomo Team Dandelion Racing	2024 Super Formula Championship
USF Pro 2000 Championship	(Australia) Lochie Hughes	2024 USF Pro 2000 Championship
USF Pro 2000 Championship	Teams: (United States) Turn 3 Motorsport	2024 USF Pro 2000 Championship
USF2000 Championship	(United States) Max Garcia	2024 USF2000 Championship
USF2000 Championship	Teams: (United States) Pabst Racing	2024 USF2000 Championship
USF Juniors	(United States) Max Taylor	2024 USF Juniors
USF Juniors	Teams: (United States) Velocity Racing Development	2024 USF Juniors
Formula Three / Formula Regional
FIA Formula 3 Championship	(Italy) Leonardo Fornaroli	2024 FIA Formula 3 Championship
FIA Formula 3 Championship	Teams: (Italy) Prema Racing	2024 FIA Formula 3 Championship
Formula Regional Americas Championship	(Canada) Patrick Woods-Toth	2024 Formula Regional Americas Championship
Formula Regional Americas Championship	Teams: (United States) Crosslink Kiwi Motorsports	2024 Formula Regional Americas Championship
Formula Regional European Championship	(Brazil) Rafael Câmara	2024 Formula Regional European Championship
Formula Regional European Championship	Teams: (Italy) Prema Racing	2024 Formula Regional European Championship
Formula Regional European Championship	Rookies: (Denmark) Noah Strømsted	2024 Formula Regional European Championship
Formula Regional Japanese Championship	(Switzerland) Michael Sauter	2024 Formula Regional Japanese Championship
Formula Regional Japanese Championship	Teams: (Japan) Birth Racing Project【BRP】	2024 Formula Regional Japanese Championship
Formula Regional Japanese Championship	Masters: (Japan) "Yugo”	2024 Formula Regional Japanese Championship
Formula Regional Middle East Championship	(Finland) Tuukka Taponen	2024 Formula Regional Middle East Championship
Formula Regional Middle East Championship	Teams: (France) R-ace GP	2024 Formula Regional Middle East Championship
Formula Regional Middle East Championship	Rookies: (Finland) Tuukka Taponen	2024 Formula Regional Middle East Championship
Formula Regional Oceania Championship	(Poland) Roman Bilinski	2024 Formula Regional Oceania Championship
Formula Regional Oceania Championship	Teams: (New Zealand) M2 Competition	2024 Formula Regional Oceania Championship
Formula Regional Oceania Championship	Rookies: (Canada) Patrick Woods-Toth	2024 Formula Regional Oceania Championship
Formula Regional Oceania Championship	Tasman Cup: (Australia) Christian Mansell	2024 Formula Regional Oceania Championship
Australian Formula Open	AFO1: (Australia) Ryan MacMillan	2024 Australian Formula Open
Australian Formula Open	AFO2: (Australia) Matthew Roesler	2024 Australian Formula Open
Australian Formula Open	AFO3: (Australia) Chris Huang	2024 Australian Formula Open
Australian Formula Open	AFO4: (Australia) Isaac McNeill	2024 Australian Formula Open
Drexler-Automotive Formula Cup	(Hungary) Benjámin Berta	2024 Drexler-Automotive Formula Cup
Drexler-Automotive Formula Cup	Formula 3 Trophy: (Switzerland) Marcel Tobler	2024 Drexler-Automotive Formula Cup
Drexler-Automotive Formula Cup	Formula Light Cup: (Italy) Karim Sartori	2024 Drexler-Automotive Formula Cup
Eurocup-3	(Singapore) Christian Ho	2024 Eurocup-3 season
Eurocup-3	Teams: (Netherlands) MP Motorsport	2024 Eurocup-3 season
Euroformula Open Championship	(United States) Brad Benavides	2024 Euroformula Open Championship
Euroformula Open Championship	Teams: (Germany) Team Motopark	2024 Euroformula Open Championship
Euroformula Open Championship	Rookies: (Brazil) Fernando Barrichello	2024 Euroformula Open Championship
GB3 Championship	(New Zealand) Louis Sharp	2024 GB3 Championship
GB3 Championship	Teams: (United Kingdom) Rodin Motorsport	2024 GB3 Championship
Super Formula Lights	(Japan) Syun Koide	2024 Super Formula Lights
Super Formula Lights	Teams: (Japan) TOM'S	2024 Super Formula Lights
Super Formula Lights	Masters: (Japan) "Dragon"	2024 Super Formula Lights
Formula 4
F1 Academy	(United Kingdom) Abbi Pulling	2024 F1 Academy season
F1 Academy	Teams: (Italy) Prema Racing	2024 F1 Academy season
Formula 4 Australian Championship	(Australia) James Piszcyk	2024 Formula 4 Australian Championship
Formula 4 Australian Championship	Teams: (Australia) AGI Sport	2024 Formula 4 Australian Championship
Formula 4 Australian Championship	Rookies: (Australia) Seth Gilmore	2024 Formula 4 Australian Championship
Formula 4 Australian Championship	Masters: (Australia) Nathan Gotch	2024 Formula 4 Australian Championship
F4 Brazilian Championship	(Brazil) Matheus Comparatto	2024 F4 Brazilian Championship
F4 Brazilian Championship	Teams: (Brazil) TMG Racing	2024 F4 Brazilian Championship
F4 Brazilian Championship	Rookies: (Brazil) Ethan Nobels	2024 F4 Brazilian Championship
F4 British Championship	(United Kingdom) Deagen Fairclough	2024 F4 British Championship
F4 British Championship	Teams: (United Kingdom) Hitech Grand Prix	2024 F4 British Championship
F4 British Championship	Rookies: (Hungary) Martin Molnár	2024 F4 British Championship
Formula 4 CEZ Championship	(Austria) Oscar Wurz	2024 Formula 4 CEZ Championship
Formula 4 CEZ Championship	Teams: (Switzerland) Jenzer Motorsport	2024 Formula 4 CEZ Championship
F4 Chinese Championship	(Sweden) Oscar Pedersen	2024 F4 Chinese Championship
F4 Chinese Championship	Teams: (China) Black Blade Racing	2024 F4 Chinese Championship
F4 Chinese Championship	Masters: (China) Fei Jun	2024 F4 Chinese Championship
French F4 Championship	(Japan) Taito Kato	2024 French F4 Championship
F4 Indian Championship	(South Africa) Aqil Alibhai	2024 F4 Indian Championship
Italian F4 Championship	(United Kingdom) Freddie Slater	2024 Italian F4 Championship
Italian F4 Championship	Teams: (Italy) Prema Racing	2024 Italian F4 Championship
Italian F4 Championship	Rookies: (United States) Alex Powell	2024 Italian F4 Championship
F4 Japanese Championship	(Japan) Yuto Nomura	2024 F4 Japanese Championship
F4 Japanese Championship	Teams: (Japan) HFDP with B-Max Racing Team	2024 F4 Japanese Championship
F4 Japanese Championship	Independent: (Japan) "Dragon"	2024 F4 Japanese Championship
F4 Japanese Championship	Independent Teams: (Japan) B-Max Racing Team	2024 F4 Japanese Championship
F4 Saudi Arabian Championship	(United Arab Emirates) Federico Al Rifai	2024 F4 Saudi Arabian Championship
F4 Saudi Arabian Championship	Rookies: (Serbia) Andrej Petrović	2024 F4 Saudi Arabian Championship
F4 Spanish Championship	(Italy) Mattia Colnaghi	2024 F4 Spanish Championship
F4 Spanish Championship	Teams: (Netherlands) KCL by MP Motorsport	2024 F4 Spanish Championship
Formula 4 UAE Championship	(United Kingdom) Freddie Slater	2024 Formula 4 UAE Championship
Formula 4 UAE Championship	Teams: (India) Mumbai Falcons Racing Limited	2024 Formula 4 UAE Championship
Formula 4 UAE Championship	Rookies: (United Kingdom) Kean Nakamura-Berta	2024 Formula 4 UAE Championship
Formula 4 United States Championship	(Australia) Daniel Quimby	2024 Formula 4 United States Championship
Formula 4 United States Championship	Teams: (United States) Crosslink Kiwi Motorsport	2024 Formula 4 United States Championship
Euro 4 Championship	(India) Akshay Bohra	2024 Euro 4 Championship
Euro 4 Championship	Teams: (Italy) Prema Racing	2024 Euro 4 Championship
Euro 4 Championship	Rookies: (United Kingdom) Kean Nakamura-Berta	2024 Euro 4 Championship
Formula Trophy UAE	(India) Kai Daryanani	2024 Formula Trophy UAE
Formula Winter Series	(Australia) Griffin Peebles	2024 Formula Winter Series
Formula Winter Series	Teams: (Netherlands) MP Motorsport	2024 Formula Winter Series
Formula Winter Series	Rookies: (Poland) Maciej Gładysz	2024 Formula Winter Series
GB4 Championship	(Sweden) Linus Granfors	2024 GB4 Championship
GB4 Championship	Teams: (United Kingdom) KMR Sport	2024 GB4 Championship
Ligier JS F4 Series	(United States) Teddy Musella	2024 Ligier JS F4 Series
Ligier JS F4 Series	Teams: (United States) Crosslink Kiwi Motorsport	2024 Ligier JS F4 Series
Nordic 4 Championship	(Denmark) Mathias Bjerre Jakobsen	2024 Nordic 4 Championship
Formula Ford
Australian Formula Ford Championship	(Australia) Eddie Beswick	2024 Australian Formula Ford Championship
New Zealand Formula Ford Championship	(New Zealand) Blake Knowles	2024 New Zealand Formula Ford Championship

== Powerboat racing ==
Series	Champion	Refer
UIM E1 World Championship	(Finland) Emma Kimiläinen (United Kingdom) Sam Coleman	2024 E1 Series Championship
UIM E1 World Championship	Teams: (United States) Team Brady	2024 E1 Series Championship
UIM F1 Powerboat World Championship	(Sweden) Jonas Andersson	2024 F1 Powerboat World Championship
UIM F1 Powerboat World Championship	Teams: Team Vietnam	2024 F1 Powerboat World Championship

== Rally ==
Series	Champion	Refer
FIA World Rally Championship	(Belgium) Thierry Neuville	2024 World Rally Championship
FIA World Rally Championship	Co-Drivers: (Belgium) Martijn Wydaeghe	2024 World Rally Championship
FIA World Rally Championship	Manufacturers: (Japan) Toyota Gazoo Racing WRT	2024 World Rally Championship
FIA WRC2 Championship	(Finland) Sami Pajari	2024 WRC2 Championship
FIA WRC2 Championship	Co-Drivers: (Finland) Enni Mälkönen	2024 WRC2 Championship
FIA WRC2 Championship	Teams: (Belgium) DG Sport Compétition	2024 WRC2 Championship
FIA WRC3 Championship	(Paraguay) Diego Dominguez Jr.	2024 WRC3 Championship
FIA WRC3 Championship	Co-Drivers: (Spain) Rogelio Peñate	2024 WRC3 Championship
FIA Junior WRC Championship	(Estonia) Romet Jürgenson	2024 Junior WRC Championship
FIA Junior WRC Championship	Co-Drivers: (Estonia) Siim Oja	2024 Junior WRC Championship
African Rally Championship	(Kenya) Karan Patel	2024 African Rally Championship
African Rally Championship	Co-Drivers: (Kenya) Tauseef Khan	2024 African Rally Championship
Asia-Pacific Rally Championship	(New Zealand) Hayden Paddon	2024 Asia-Pacific Rally Championship
Asia-Pacific Rally Championship	Co-Drivers: (New Zealand) Jared Hudson	2024 Asia-Pacific Rally Championship
Australian Rally Championship	(Australia) Harry Bates	
Australian Rally Championship	Co-Drivers: (Australia) Coral Taylor	
British Rally Championship	(United Kingdom) Chris Ingram	2024 British Rally Championship
British Rally Championship	Co-Drivers: (United Kingdom) Alex Kihurani	2024 British Rally Championship
British Rally Championship	Manufacturers: (Japan) Toyota	2024 British Rally Championship
Canadian Rally Championship	(Canada) Jean-Sébastien Besner	2024 Canadian Rally Championship
Canadian Rally Championship	Co-Drivers: (Canada) Alan Ockwell	2024 Canadian Rally Championship
Canadian Rally Championship	Manufacturers: (United States) Ford	2024 Canadian Rally Championship
Czech Rally Championship	(Czech Republic) Dominik Stříteský	
Czech Rally Championship	Co-Drivers: (Czech Republic) Jiří Hovorka	
Deutsche Rallye Meisterschaft	(Germany) Marijan Griebel	
Deutsche Rallye Meisterschaft	Co-Drivers: (Germany) Tobias Braun	
European Rally Championship	(New Zealand) Hayden Paddon	2024 European Rally Championship
European Rally Championship	Co-Drivers: (New Zealand) John Kennard	2024 European Rally Championship
European Rally Championship	Teams: (Italy) BRC Racing Team	2024 European Rally Championship
European Rally Championship	ERC3: (Czech Republic) Filip Kohn	2024 European Rally Championship
European Rally Championship	ERC3 Co-Drivers: (United Kingdom) Tom Woodburn	2024 European Rally Championship
European Rally Championship	ERC4: (Sweden) Mille Johansson	2024 European Rally Championship
European Rally Championship	ERC4 Co-Drivers: (Sweden) Johan Grönvall	2024 European Rally Championship
European Rally Championship	Junior ERC: (Sweden) Mille Johansson	2024 European Rally Championship
French Rally Championship	(France) Léo Rossel	
French Rally Championship	Co-Drivers: (France) Guillaume Mercoiret	
Hungarian Rally Championship	(Hungary) Ádám Velenczei	
Hungarian Rally Championship	Co-Drivers: (Hungary) Zsolt Vánsza	
Italian Rally Championship	(Italy) Andrea Crugnola	
Italian Rally Championship	Co-Drivers: (Italy) Pietro Elia Ometto	
Italian Rally Championship	Manufacturers: (Czech Republic) Škoda	
New Zealand Rally Championship	(New Zealand) Ben Hunt	2024 New Zealand Rally Championship
New Zealand Rally Championship	Co-Drivers: (New Zealand) Tony Rawstorn	2024 New Zealand Rally Championship
Polish Rally Championship	(Poland) Jarosław Szeja	
Polish Rally Championship	Co-Drivers: (Poland) Marcin Szeja	
Scottish Rally Championship	(United Kingdom) Euan Thorburn	2024 Scottish Rally Championship
Scottish Rally Championship	Co-Drivers: (United Kingdom) Keir Beaton	2024 Scottish Rally Championship
South African National Rally Championship	2WD: (South Africa) Chris Coertse	
South African National Rally Championship	2WD Co-Drivers: (South Africa) Carolyn Swan	
South African National Rally Championship	4WD: (South Africa) Anton Raaths	
South African National Rally Championship	4WD Co-Drivers: (South Africa) Isabel Raaths	

=== Rally raid ===
Series	Champion	Refer
World Rally-Raid Championship	(Qatar) Nasser Al-Attiyah	2024 World Rally-Raid Championship
World Rally-Raid Championship	Co-Drivers: (France) Édouard Boulanger	2024 World Rally-Raid Championship
World Rally-Raid Championship	Manufacturers: (Japan) Toyota	2024 World Rally-Raid Championship
World Rally-Raid Championship	Challenger: (Lithuania) Rokas Baciuška	2024 World Rally-Raid Championship
World Rally-Raid Championship	SSV: (Saudi Arabia) Yasir Seidan	2024 World Rally-Raid Championship

=== Rallycross ===
Series	Champion	Refer
FIA World Rallycross Championship	(Sweden) Johan Kristoffersson	2024 FIA World Rallycross Championship
FIA World Rallycross Championship	Teams: (Sweden) KMS - HORSE Powertrain	2024 FIA World Rallycross Championship
FIA European Rallycross Championship	RX1: (United Kingdom) Patrick O'Donovan	2024 FIA European Rallycross Championship
FIA European Rallycross Championship	RX2e: (Sweden) Nils Andersson	2024 FIA European Rallycross Championship
FIA European Rallycross Championship	RX3: (Germany) Nils Volland	2024 FIA European Rallycross Championship
Nitrocross	Group E: (Sweden) Robin Larsson	2023–24 Nitrocross Championship
Nitrocross	Group E Team: (United States) Dreyer & Reinbold Racing JC	2023–24 Nitrocross Championship
Nitrocross	NEXT: (Sweden) Casper Jansson	2023–24 Nitrocross Championship
Nitrocross	SxS: (United States) Kainan Baker	2023–24 Nitrocross Championship

== Sports car and GT ==
Series	Champion	Refer
FIA World Endurance Championship	Hypercar: (France) Kévin Estre; Hypercar: (Germany) André Lotterer; Hypercar: (Belgium) Laurens Vanthoor	2024 FIA World Endurance Championship
FIA World Endurance Championship	Hypercar Teams: (United Kingdom) #12 Hertz Team Jota	2024 FIA World Endurance Championship
FIA World Endurance Championship	Hypercar Manufacturers: (Japan) Toyota	2024 FIA World Endurance Championship
FIA World Endurance Championship	LMGT3: (Austria) Klaus Bachler; LMGT3: (Saint Kitts and Nevis) Alex Malykhin; LMGT3: (Germany) Joel Sturm	2024 FIA World Endurance Championship
FIA World Endurance Championship	LMGT3 Teams: (Lithuania) #92 Manthey PureRxcing	2024 FIA World Endurance Championship
24H Series	GT3: (Germany) Ralf Bohn; GT3: (United States) Jason Hart; GT3: (United States) Scott Noble	2024 24H Series
24H Series	GT3 Teams: (Germany) No. 91 Herberth Motorsport	2024 24H Series
24H Series	GT3 Pro-Am: (Germany) Pierre Kaffer; GT3 Pro-Am: (Austria) Michael Doppelmayr; GT3 Pro-Am: (Germany) Elia Erhart	2024 24H Series
24H Series	GT3 Pro-Am Teams: (France) No. 18 Saintéloc Junior Team	2024 24H Series
24H Series	GT3 Am: (Germany) Ralf Bohn; GT3 Am: (United States) Jason Hart; GT3 Am: (United States) Scott Noble	2024 24H Series
24H Series	GT3 Am Teams: (Germany) No. 91 Herberth Motorsport	2024 24H Series
24H Series	GTX: (France) Lionel Amrouche; GTX: (France) Philippe Bonnel; GTX: (France) Gilles Courtois	2024 24H Series
24H Series	GTX Teams: (France) No. 701 Vortex V8	2024 24H Series
24H Series	992: (Belgium) Ayrton Redant; 992: (Belgium) Yannick Redant	2024 24H Series
24H Series	992 Teams: (Belgium) No. 903 Red Ant Racing	2024 24H Series
24H Series	992 Am: (United States) Tracy Krohn; 992 Am: (Sweden) Niclas Jönsson; 992 Am: (Germany) Philip Hamprecht	2024 24H Series
24H Series	992 Am Teams: (Germany) No. 907 Krohn Racing	2024 24H Series
24H Series	GT4: (Seychelles) Aliyyah Koloc; GT4: (Czech Republic) Adam Lacko; GT4: (Czech Republic) David Vrsecky	2024 24H Series
24H Series	GT4: (United Arab Emirates) No. 416 Buggyra ZM Racing	2024 24H Series
24H Series	TCE: (Mexico) Benito Tagle; TCE: (Germany) Henning Eschweiler	2024 24H Series
24H Series	TCE Teams: (Germany) No. 127 SRS Team Sorg Rennsport	2024 24H Series
24H Series	TCX: (Mexico) Benito Tagle; TCX: (Germany) Henning Eschweiler	2024 24H Series
24H Series	TCX Teams: (Germany) No. 127 SRS Team Sorg Rennsport	2024 24H Series
ADAC GT Masters	(Germany) Tom Kalender (Finland) Elias Seppänen	2024 ADAC GT Masters
ADAC GT Masters	Teams: (Germany) Haupt Racing Team	2024 ADAC GT Masters
ADAC GT Masters	Pro-Am: (Germany) Alexander Schwarzer; Pro-Am: (Switzerland) Alexander Fach	2024 ADAC GT Masters
ADAC GT Masters	Silver: (Germany) Tom Kalender; Silver: (Finland) Elias Seppänen	2024 ADAC GT Masters
ADAC GT4 Germany	(Germany) Finn Zulauf (Czech Republic) Josef Knopp	2024 ADAC GT4 Germany
ADAC GT4 Germany	Teams: (Germany) AVIA W&S Motorsport	2024 ADAC GT4 Germany
ADAC GT4 Germany	Trophy: (Germany) Max Kronberg	2024 ADAC GT4 Germany
ADAC GT4 Germany	Junior: (Germany) Finn Zulauf; Junior: (Czech Republic) Josef Knopp	2024 ADAC GT4 Germany
Asian Le Mans Series	LMP2: (United States) Colin Braun; LMP2: (United States) George Kurtz; LMP2: (Denmark) Malthe Jakobsen	2023–24 Asian Le Mans Series
Asian Le Mans Series	LMP2 Teams: (Portugal) #4 CrowdStrike Racing by APR	2023–24 Asian Le Mans Series
Asian Le Mans Series	LMP3: (Saint Kitts and Nevis) Alexander Bukhantsov; LMP3: (United Kingdom) James Winslow	2023–24 Asian Le Mans Series
Asian Le Mans Series	LMP3 Teams: (Switzerland) #17 Cool Racing	2023–24 Asian Le Mans Series
Asian Le Mans Series	GT: (Saint Kitts and Nevis) Alex Malykhin; GT: (Austria) Klaus Bachler; GT: (Germany) Joel Sturm	2023–24 Asian Le Mans Series
Asian Le Mans Series	GT Teams: (Lithuania) #91 Pure Rxcing	2023–24 Asian Le Mans Series
British GT Championship	GT3: (United Kingdom) Ricky Collard; GT3: (United Kingdom) Rob Collard	2024 British GT Championship
British GT Championship	GT3 Teams: (United Kingdom) Barwell Motorsport	2024 British GT Championship
British GT Championship	GT3 Pro-Am: (United Kingdom) Ricky Collard; GT3 Pro-Am: (United Kingdom) Rob Collard	2024 British GT Championship
British GT Championship	GT3 Silver-Am: (United Kingdom) Shaun Balfe; GT3 Silver-Am: (United Kingdom) Adam Smalley	2024 British GT Championship
British GT Championship	GT4: (United Kingdom) Jack Brown; GT4: (United Kingdom) Zac Meakin	2024 British GT Championship
British GT Championship	GT4 Teams: (United Kingdom) Forsetti Motorsport	2024 British GT Championship
British GT Championship	GT4 Pro-Am: (United Kingdom) Charles Dawson; GT4 Pro-Am: (United Kingdom) Seb Morris	2024 British GT Championship
British GT Championship	GT4 Silver: (United Kingdom) Mikey Porter; GT4 Silver: (United Arab Emirates) Jamie Day	2024 British GT Championship
Deutsche Tourenwagen Masters	(Italy) Mirko Bortolotti	2024 Deutsche Tourenwagen Masters
Deutsche Tourenwagen Masters	Teams: (Germany) Schubert Motorsport	2024 Deutsche Tourenwagen Masters
Deutsche Tourenwagen Masters	Manufacturers: (Germany) Mercedes-AMG	2024 Deutsche Tourenwagen Masters
European Le Mans Series	LMP2: (Switzerland) Louis Delétraz; LMP2: (United Kingdom) Jonny Edgar; LMP2: (Poland) Robert Kubica	2024 European Le Mans Series
European Le Mans Series	LMP2 Teams: (United States) AO by TF	2024 European Le Mans Series
European Le Mans Series	LMP2 Pro-Am: (Italy) Alessio Rovera; LMP2 Pro-Am: (France) François Perrodo; LMP2 Pro-Am: (France) Matthieu Vaxivière	2024 European Le Mans Series
European Le Mans Series	LMP2 Pro-Am Teams: (Italy) AF Corse	2024 European Le Mans Series
European Le Mans Series	LMP3: (United Kingdom) Nick Adcock; LMP3: (Denmark) Michael Jensen; LMP3: (France) Gaël Julien	2024 European Le Mans Series
European Le Mans Series	LMP3 Teams: (United Kingdom) RLR MSport	2024 European Le Mans Series
European Le Mans Series	LMGT3: (Italy) Andrea Caldarelli; LMGT3: (Japan) Hiroshi Hamaguchi; LMGT3: (Zimbabwe) Axcil Jefferies	2024 European Le Mans Series
European Le Mans Series	LMGT3 Teams: (Italy) Iron Lynx	2024 European Le Mans Series
French GT4 Cup	Silver: (France) Victor Weyrich; Silver: (Ecuador) Mateo Villagomez	2024 French GT4 Cup
French GT4 Cup	Pro-Am: (France) Gael Castelli; Pro-Am: (France) Rodolphe Wallgren	2024 French GT4 Cup
French GT4 Cup	Am: (France) Mateo Salomone; Am: (France) Rudy Servol	2024 French GT4 Cup
French GT4 Cup	Silver Teams: (Switzerland) Racing Spirit of Léman	2024 French GT4 Cup
French GT4 Cup	Pro-Am Teams: (France) Schumacher CLRT	2024 French GT4 Cup
French GT4 Cup	Am Teams: (France) AV Racing	2024 French GT4 Cup
Ginetta Junior Championship	(United Kingdom) Ethan Jeff-Hall	2024 Ginetta Junior Championship
Ginetta Junior Championship	Teams: (United Kingdom) R Racing	2024 Ginetta Junior Championship
Ginetta Junior Championship	Rookies: (United Kingdom) Ethan Jeff-Hall	2024 Ginetta Junior Championship
GT America Series	SRO3: (United States) Johnny O'Connell	2024 GT America Series
GT America Series	SRO3 Teams: (United States) CRP/Daskalos Racing	2024 GT America Series
GT America Series	GT2: (United States) Alan Grossberg	2024 GT America Series
GT America Series	GT2 Teams: (United States) TPC with Dream Racing	2024 GT America Series
GT America Series	GT4: (United States) Isaac Sherman	2024 GT America Series
GT America Series	GT4 Teams: (Germany) Rotek Racing	2024 GT America Series
GT Cup Open Europe	(Germany) Luca Ludwig (Spain) Iván Velasco	2024 GT Cup Open Europe
GT Cup Open Europe	Teams: (Belgium) Q1-trackracing	2024 GT Cup Open Europe
GT Cup Open Europe	Am: (Brazil) Leandro Martins; Am: (Austria) Dieter Svepes	2024 GT Cup Open Europe
GT Winter Series	GT3: (Germany) Jay Mo Härtling; GT3: (Germany) Kenneth Heyer	2024 GT Winter Series
GT Winter Series	GT3 Teams: (Germany) SR Motorsport	2024 GT Winter Series
GT Winter Series	Cup 1: (United Kingdom) John Dhillon; Cup 1: (Republic of Ireland) Matt Griffin	2024 GT Winter Series
GT Winter Series	Cup 2: (Portugal) Leandro Martins; Cup 2: (Austria) Dieter Svepes	2024 GT Winter Series
GT Winter Series	Cup 3: (Denmark) Morten Strømsted	2024 GT Winter Series
GT Winter Series	Cup 4: (Poland) Adrian Lewandowski	2024 GT Winter Series
GT World Challenge Asia	(China) Leo Ye Hongli (China) Yuan Bo	2024 GT World Challenge Asia
GT World Challenge Asia	Teams: (China) Origine Motorsport	2024 GT World Challenge Asia
GT World Challenge Asia	Pro-Am Cup: (China) Anthony Liu Xu; Pro-Am Cup: (Belgium) Alessio Picariello	2024 GT World Challenge Asia
GT World Challenge Asia	Silver Cup: (China) Cheng Congfu; Silver Cup: (Hong Kong) Adderly Fong	2024 GT World Challenge Asia
GT World Challenge Asia	Silver-Am Cup: (China) Leo Ye Hongli; Silver-Am Cup: (China) Yuan Bo	2024 GT World Challenge Asia
GT World Challenge Asia	Am Cup: (Indonesia) David Tjiptobiantoro	2024 GT World Challenge Asia
GT World Challenge Asia	China Cup: Cheng Congfu; China Cup: (Hong Kong) Adderly Fong	2024 GT World Challenge Asia
GT World Challenge America	Pro: (United States) Adam Adelson; Pro: (United States) Elliott Skeer	2024 GT World Challenge America
GT World Challenge America	Pro Teams: (United States) Wright Motorsports	2024 GT World Challenge America
GT World Challenge America	Pro-Am: (United States) Robby Foley; Pro-Am: (United States) Justin Rothberg	2024 GT World Challenge America
GT World Challenge America	Pro-Am Teams: (United States) Turner Motorsport	2024 GT World Challenge America
GT World Challenge America	Am: (United States) Jay Schreibman; Am: (Brazil) Oswaldo Negri Jr.	2024 GT World Challenge America
GT World Challenge America	Am Teams: (Italy) AF Corse	2024 GT World Challenge America
GT World Challenge Australia	Pro-Am: (Australia) Chaz Mostert; Pro-Am: (Australia) Liam Talbot	2024 GT World Challenge Australia
GT World Challenge Australia	Pro-Am Teams: (Australia) Arise Racing GT	2024 GT World Challenge Australia
GT World Challenge Australia	Am: (Australia) Mike Sheargold; Am: (Australia) Garth Walden	2024 GT World Challenge Australia
GT World Challenge Australia	Am Teams: (Australia) Tigani Motorsport	2024 GT World Challenge Australia
GT World Challenge Australia	Endurance Pro-Am: (Australia) Liam Talbot	2024 GT World Challenge Australia
GT World Challenge Australia	Endurance Am: (Australia) Garth Walden	2024 GT World Challenge Australia
GT World Challenge Europe	(Austria) Lucas Auer (Germany) Maro Engel	2024 GT World Challenge Europe
GT World Challenge Europe	Teams: (Belgium) Team WRT	2024 GT World Challenge Europe
GT World Challenge Europe	Gold Cup: (France) Paul Evrard; Gold Cup: (Belgium) Gilles Magnus	2024 GT World Challenge Europe
GT World Challenge Europe	Gold Cup Teams: (France) Saintéloc Racing	2024 GT World Challenge Europe
GT World Challenge Europe	Silver Cup: (France) César Gazeau; Silver Cup: (France) Aurélien Panis	2024 GT World Challenge Europe
GT World Challenge Europe	Silver Cup Teams: (Belgium) Boutsen VDS	2024 GT World Challenge Europe
GT World Challenge Europe	Bronze Cup: (Italy) Eddie Cheever III; Bronze Cup: (Hong Kong) Jonathan Hui	2024 GT World Challenge Europe
GT World Challenge Europe	Bronze Cup Teams: (Germany) Rutronik Racing	2024 GT World Challenge Europe
GT World Challenge Europe Endurance Cup	(Italy) Alessandro Pier Guidi (Italy) Alessio Rovera	2024 GT World Challenge Europe Endurance Cup
GT World Challenge Europe Endurance Cup	Teams: (Italy) AF Corse - Francorchamps Motors	2024 GT World Challenge Europe Endurance Cup
GT World Challenge Europe Endurance Cup	Gold Cup: (France) Paul Evrard; Gold Cup: (Belgium) Gilles Magnus; Gold Cup: (France) Jim Pla	2024 GT World Challenge Europe Endurance Cup
GT World Challenge Europe Endurance Cup	Gold Cup Teams: (France) Saintéloc Racing	2024 GT World Challenge Europe Endurance Cup
GT World Challenge Europe Endurance Cup	Silver Cup: (Netherlands) Daan Arrow; Silver Cup: (Netherlands) Colin Caresani; Silver Cup: (Thailand) Tanart Sathienthirakul	2024 GT World Challenge Europe Endurance Cup
GT World Challenge Europe Endurance Cup	Silver Cup Teams: (United States) Winward Racing	2024 GT World Challenge Europe Endurance Cup
GT World Challenge Europe Endurance Cup	Bronze Cup: (Italy) Eddie Cheever III; Bronze Cup: (United Kingdom) Chris Froggatt; Bronze Cup: (Hong Kong) Jonathan Hui	2024 GT World Challenge Europe Endurance Cup
GT World Challenge Europe Endurance Cup	Bronze Cup Teams: (United Kingdom) SKY Tempesta Racing	2024 GT World Challenge Europe Endurance Cup
GT World Challenge Europe Sprint Cup	(Austria) Lucas Auer (Germany) Maro Engel	2024 GT World Challenge Europe Sprint Cup
GT World Challenge Europe Sprint Cup	Teams: (United States) Winward Racing Team Mann-Filter	2024 GT World Challenge Europe Sprint Cup
GT World Challenge Europe Sprint Cup	Gold Cup: (Germany) Luca Engstler; Gold Cup: (Austria) Max Hofer	2024 GT World Challenge Europe Sprint Cup
GT World Challenge Europe Sprint Cup	Gold Cup Teams: (Germany) Liqui Moly Team Engstler by OneGroup	2024 GT World Challenge Europe Sprint Cup
GT World Challenge Europe Sprint Cup	Silver Cup: (Australia) Calan Williams	2024 GT World Challenge Europe Sprint Cup
GT World Challenge Europe Sprint Cup	Silver Cup Teams: (Belgium) Team WRT	2024 GT World Challenge Europe Sprint Cup
GT World Challenge Europe Sprint Cup	Bronze Cup: (United Kingdom) Dan Harper; Bronze Cup: (United Kingdom) Darren Leung	2024 GT World Challenge Europe Sprint Cup
GT World Challenge Europe Sprint Cup	Bronze Cup Teams: (United Kingdom) Century Motorsport	2024 GT World Challenge Europe Sprint Cup
GT2 European Series	Pro-Am: (Switzerland) Martin Koch; Pro-Am: (Austria) Reinhard Kofler	2024 GT2 European Series
GT2 European Series	Pro-Am Teams: (Austria) MZR Motorsportzentrum Ried	2024 GT2 European Series
GT2 European Series	Am: (Monaco) Philippe Prette	2024 GT2 European Series
GT2 European Series	Am Teams: (Italy) LP Racing	2024 GT2 European Series
GT4 America Series	Silver: (United States) John Capestro-Dubets; Silver: (United States) Eric Filgueiras	2024 GT4 America Series
GT4 America Series	Pro-Am: (United States) Curt Swearingin; Pro-Am: (Netherlands) Kay van Berlo	2024 GT4 America Series
GT4 America Series	Am: (United States) Jaden Lander; Am: (United States) Robb Holland	2024 GT4 America Series
GT4 Australia Series	Silver: (Australia) Marcos Flack; Silver: (Australia) Tom Hayman	2024 GT4 Australia Series
GT4 Australia Series	Teams: (Australia) Method Motorsport	2024 GT4 Australia Series
GT4 Australia Series	Pro-Am: (Australia) Lachlan Mineeff; Pro-Am: (Australia) Shane Smollen	2024 GT4 Australia Series
GT4 Australia Series	Am: (Australia) Jacob Lawrence	2024 GT4 Australia Series
GT4 European Series	Silver: (United Kingdom) Tom Lebbon; Silver: (United Kingdom) Josh Rattican	2024 GT4 European Series
GT4 European Series	Silver Teams: (United Kingdom) Elite Motorsport with Entire Race Engineering	2024 GT4 European Series
GT4 European Series	Pro-Am: (Germany) Max Kronberg; Pro-Am: (Germany) Finn Zulauf	2024 GT4 European Series
GT4 European Series	Pro-Am Teams: (Germany) W&S Motorsport	2024 GT4 European Series
GT4 European Series	Am: (France) Pascal Huteau; Am: (France) Laurent Hurgon	2024 GT4 European Series
GT4 European Series	Am Teams: (France) Schumacher CLRT	2024 GT4 European Series
GT4 Winter Series	(United Arab Emirates) Jamie Day (United Kingdom) Mikey Porter	2024 GT4 Winter Series
GT4 Winter Series	Teams: (United Kingdom) Forsetti Motorsport	2024 GT4 Winter Series
GT4 Winter Series	Pro: (United Arab Emirates) Jamie Day; Pro: (United Kingdom) Mikey Porter	2024 GT4 Winter Series
GT4 Winter Series	Pro-Am: (United Kingdom) Charles Dawson; Pro-Am: (Norway) Emil Gjerdrum	2024 GT4 Winter Series
GT4 Winter Series	Am: (Switzerland) Max Huber	2024 GT4 Winter Series
GT4 Winter Series	Cayman Trophy: (Spain) Michael Sander	2024 GT4 Winter Series
IMSA Ford Mustang Challenge	(United States) Robert Noaker	2024 IMSA Ford Mustang Challenge
IMSA Ford Mustang Challenge	Teams: (United States) Robert Noaker Racing	2024 IMSA Ford Mustang Challenge
IMSA Ford Mustang Challenge	Legends: (United States) Zachry Lee	2024 IMSA Ford Mustang Challenge
IMSA SportsCar Championship	GTP: (United States) Dane Cameron; GTP: (Brazil) Felipe Nasr	2024 IMSA SportsCar Championship
IMSA SportsCar Championship	GTP Teams: (United States) #7 Porsche Penske Motorsport	2024 IMSA SportsCar Championship
IMSA SportsCar Championship	GTP Manufacturers: (Germany) Porsche	2024 IMSA SportsCar Championship
IMSA SportsCar Championship	LMP2: (United States) Nick Boulle; LMP2: (France) Tom Dillmann	2024 IMSA SportsCar Championship
IMSA SportsCar Championship	LMP2 Teams: (United States) #52 Inter Europol by PR1/Mathiasen Motorsports	2024 IMSA SportsCar Championship
IMSA SportsCar Championship	GTD Pro: (Germany) Laurin Heinrich	2024 IMSA SportsCar Championship
IMSA SportsCar Championship	GTD Pro Teams: (United States) #77 AO Racing	2024 IMSA SportsCar Championship
IMSA SportsCar Championship	GTD Pro Manufacturers: (Germany) Porsche	2024 IMSA SportsCar Championship
IMSA SportsCar Championship	GTD: (United States) Russell Ward; GTD: (Switzerland) Philip Ellis	2024 IMSA SportsCar Championship
IMSA SportsCar Championship	GTD Teams: (United States) #57 Winward Racing	2024 IMSA SportsCar Championship
IMSA SportsCar Championship	GTD Manufacturers: (Germany) Mercedes-AMG	2024 IMSA SportsCar Championship
IMSA VP Racing SportsCar Challenge	LMP3: (United States) Steven Aghakhani	2024 IMSA VP Racing SportsCar Challenge
IMSA VP Racing SportsCar Challenge	LMP3 Teams: (United States) #87 Fast MD Racing with Remstar	2024 IMSA VP Racing SportsCar Challenge
IMSA VP Racing SportsCar Challenge	LMP3 Bronze: (United States) Brian Thienes	2024 IMSA VP Racing SportsCar Challenge
IMSA VP Racing SportsCar Challenge	GSX: (United States) Luca Mars	2024 IMSA VP Racing SportsCar Challenge
IMSA VP Racing SportsCar Challenge	GSX Teams: (United States) #59 KohR Motorsports	2024 IMSA VP Racing SportsCar Challenge
IMSA VP Racing SportsCar Challenge	GSX Manufacturers: (United States) Ford	2024 IMSA VP Racing SportsCar Challenge
IMSA VP Racing SportsCar Challenge	GSX Bronze: (United States) Scott Blind	2024 IMSA VP Racing SportsCar Challenge
Indian Racing League	(India) No. 24 Goa Aces JA Racing ( (South Africa) Raoul Hyman/ (India) Sohil Shah)	2024 Indian Racing League
Indian Racing League	Teams: (India) Goa Aces JA Racing	2024 Indian Racing League
Intercontinental GT Challenge	(Belgium) Charles Weerts	2024 Intercontinental GT Challenge
Intercontinental GT Challenge	Manufacturers: (Germany) Porsche	2024 Intercontinental GT Challenge
Intercontinental GT Challenge	Independent: (Hong Kong) Antares Au	2024 Intercontinental GT Challenge
International GT Open	(Germany) Christopher Haase (Austria) Simon Reicher	2024 International GT Open
International GT Open	Teams: (Italy) Oregon Team	2024 International GT Open
International GT Open	Pro-Am: (Italy) Marco Pulcini	2024 International GT Open
International GT Open	Am: (Italy) Giuseppe Cipriani	2024 International GT Open
Italian GT Championship	Sprint GT3 Pro: (Germany) Jens Klingmann	2024 Italian GT Championship
Italian GT Championship	Sprint GT3 Pro-Am: (Brazil) Pedro Carvalho Ebrahim; Sprint GT3 Pro-Am: (Italy) Federico Malvestiti	2024 Italian GT Championship
Italian GT Championship	Sprint GT3 Am: (United States) Glenn McGee; Sprint GT3 Am: (United States) Anthony McIntosh	2024 Italian GT Championship
Italian GT Championship	Sprint GT Cup Pro-Am Div. 1: (France) Stephane Tribaudini; Sprint GT Cup Pro-Am Div. 1: (Italy) Ignazio Zanon	2024 Italian GT Championship
Italian GT Championship	Sprint GT Cup Pro-Am Div. 2: (Italy) Massimo Navatta; Sprint GT Cup Pro-Am Div. 2: (Italy) Andrea Palma	2024 Italian GT Championship
Italian GT Championship	Sprint GT Cup Am Div. 1: (Italy) Edoardo Borrelli; Sprint GT Cup Am Div. 1: (Monaco) Lorenzo Casè	2024 Italian GT Championship
Italian GT Championship	Sprint GT Cup Am Div. 2: (Italy) Nicolò Liana; Sprint GT Cup Am Div. 2: (Italy) Daniele Polverini	2024 Italian GT Championship
Italian GT Championship	Endurance GT3 Pro: (Italy) Giancarlo Fisichella; Endurance GT3 Pro: (Monaco) Arthur Leclerc; Endurance GT3 Pro: (Italy) Tommaso Mosca	2024 Italian GT Championship
Italian GT Championship	Endurance GT3 Pro-Am: (Belgium) Gilles Stadsbader	2024 Italian GT Championship
Italian GT Championship	Endurance GT3 Am: (Italy) Leonardo Colavita; Endurance GT3 Am: (Italy) Simone Riccitelli; Endurance GT3 Am: (Switzerland) Christoph Ulrich	2024 Italian GT Championship
Italian GT Championship	Endurance GT Cup Pro-Am Div. 1: (Italy) Luca Demarchi; Endurance GT Cup Pro-Am Div. 1: (Italy) Sabatino Di Mare; Endurance GT Cup Pro-Am Div. 1: (Italy) Simone Patrinicola	2024 Italian GT Championship
Italian GT Championship	Endurance GT Cup Pro-Am Div. 2: (Italy) Giovanni Berton; Endurance GT Cup Pro-Am Div. 2: (Italy) Ludovico Laurini; Endurance GT Cup Pro-Am Div. 2: (Italy) Constantino Peroni	2024 Italian GT Championship
Italian GT Championship	Endurance GT Cup Am Div. 1: (United Kingdom) Douglas Bolger; Endurance GT Cup Am Div. 1: (Italy) Alberto Clementi Pisani; Endurance GT Cup Am Div. 1: (Italy) Ferdinando D'Auria	2024 Italian GT Championship
Italian GT Championship	Endurance GT Cup Am Div. 2: (Italy) Andrea Buratti; Endurance GT Cup Am Div. 2: (Netherlands) Sandra van der Sloot	2024 Italian GT Championship
Lamborghini Super Trofeo Asia	Pro: (United Kingdom) Dan Wells	2024 Lamborghini Super Trofeo Asia
Lamborghini Super Trofeo Asia	Teams: (Australia) DW Evans GT	2024 Lamborghini Super Trofeo Asia
Lamborghini Super Trofeo Asia	Pro-Am: (China) Fangping Chen; Pro-Am: (Macau) André Couto	2024 Lamborghini Super Trofeo Asia
Lamborghini Super Trofeo Asia	Am: (South Korea) Changwoo Lee	2024 Lamborghini Super Trofeo Asia
Lamborghini Super Trofeo Asia	Lamborghini Cup: (Malaysia) Hairie Zairel Oh; Lamborghini Cup: (Malaysia) Haziq Zairel Oh	2024 Lamborghini Super Trofeo Asia
Lamborghini Super Trofeo Europe	Pro: (France) Amaury Bonduel	2024 Lamborghini Super Trofeo Europe
Lamborghini Super Trofeo Europe	Teams: (Italy) Target Racing	2024 Lamborghini Super Trofeo Europe
Lamborghini Super Trofeo Europe	Pro-Am: (Czech Republic) Bronislav Formánek; Pro-Am: (Czech Republic) Štefan Rosina	2024 Lamborghini Super Trofeo Europe
Lamborghini Super Trofeo Europe	Am: (Italy) Piergiacomo Randazzo; Am: (France) Stephane Tribaudini	2024 Lamborghini Super Trofeo Europe
Lamborghini Super Trofeo North America	Pro: (United States) Ernie Francis Jr. Pro: (South Africa) Giano Taurino	2024 Lamborghini Super Trofeo North America
Lamborghini Super Trofeo North America	Teams: (United States) Wayne Taylor Racing with Andretti	2024 Lamborghini Super Trofeo North America
Lamborghini Super Trofeo North America	Dealer: (United States) Lamborghini Palm Beach	2024 Lamborghini Super Trofeo North America
Lamborghini Super Trofeo North America	Pro-Am: (United States) AJ Muss; Pro-Am: (United States) Joel Miller	2024 Lamborghini Super Trofeo North America
Lamborghini Super Trofeo North America	Am: (United States) Anthony McIntosh; Am: (United States) Glenn McGee	2024 Lamborghini Super Trofeo North America
Lamborghini Super Trofeo North America	LB Cup: (United States) Nick Groat	2024 Lamborghini Super Trofeo North America
Le Mans Cup	LMP3: (France) Adrien Chila; LMP3: (Switzerland) David Droux	2024 Le Mans Cup
Le Mans Cup	LMP3 Teams: (Switzerland) #97 Cool Racing	2024 Le Mans Cup
Le Mans Cup	GT3: (Italy) Alessandro Balzan; GT3: (United States) Matt Kurzejewski	2024 Le Mans Cup
Le Mans Cup	GT3 Teams: (Italy) AF Corse	2024 Le Mans Cup
Ligier European Series	JS P4: (United Kingdom) Haydn Chance; JS P4: (United Kingdom) Theo Micouris	2024 Ligier European Series
Ligier European Series	JS P4 Teams: (Poland) #1 Team Virage	2024 Ligier European Series
Ligier European Series	JS P4 Pro-Am: (United Arab Emirates) Alim Geshev; JS P4 Pro-Am: (Colombia) Lucas Medina	2024 Ligier European Series
Ligier European Series	JS P4 Pro-Am Teams: (Poland) #32 Team Virage	2024 Ligier European Series
Ligier European Series	JS P4 Am: (Japan) Yuki Tanaka	2024 Ligier European Series
Ligier European Series	JS P4 Am Teams: (France) #16 Pegasus Racing	2024 Ligier European Series
Ligier European Series	JS2 R: (France) Julien Schell; JS2 R: (France) David Caussanel	2024 Ligier European Series
Ligier European Series	JS2 R Teams: (France) #29 Pegasus Racing	2024 Ligier European Series
Ligier European Series	JS2 R Pro-Am: (France) Julien Schell; JS2 R Pro-Am: (France) David Caussanel	2024 Ligier European Series
Ligier European Series	JS2 R Pro-Am Teams: (France) #29 Pegasus Racing	2024 Ligier European Series
Ligier European Series	JS2 R Am: (France) Louis Stern	2024 Ligier European Series
Ligier European Series	JS2 R Am Teams: (France) #18 Pegasus Racing	2024 Ligier European Series
Mazda MX-5 Cup	(United States) Gresham Wagner	2024 Mazda MX-5 Cup
Michelin Pilot Challenge	GS: (United States) Matt Plumb	2024 Michelin Pilot Challenge
Michelin Pilot Challenge	GS Teams: (United States) #46 Team TGM	2024 Michelin Pilot Challenge
Michelin Pilot Challenge	GS Manufacturers: (United Kingdom) Aston Martin	2024 Michelin Pilot Challenge
Michelin Pilot Challenge	TCR: (United States) Chris Miller; TCR: (South Africa) Mikey Taylor	2024 Michelin Pilot Challenge
Michelin Pilot Challenge	TCR Teams: (United States) #17 Unitronic/JDC-Miller MotorSports	2024 Michelin Pilot Challenge
Michelin Pilot Challenge	TCR Manufacturers: (South Korea) Hyundai	2024 Michelin Pilot Challenge
Middle East Trophy	GT3: (Italy) Cosimo Papi; GT3: (Italy) Fabrizio Broggi; GT3: (Italy) Sabino de Castro; GT3: (Romania) Sergiu Nicolae	2023–24 Middle East Trophy
Middle East Trophy	GT3 Teams: (United Arab Emirates) No. 95 Manamauri Energy by Ebimotors	2023–24 Middle East Trophy
Middle East Trophy	GT3 Pro-Am: (United Kingdom) Lewis Plato; GT3 Pro-Am: (United Kingdom) Carl Cavers; GT3 Pro-Am: (United Kingdom) Jack Barlow	2023–24 Middle East Trophy
Middle East Trophy	GT3 Pro-Am Teams: (United Kingdom) No. 22 Century Motorsport	2023–24 Middle East Trophy
Middle East Trophy	GT3 Am: (United States) Charles Putman; GT3 Am: (United States) Joe Foster; GT3 Am: (United States) Shane Lewis; GT3 Am: (United States) Charles Espenlaub	2023–24 Middle East Trophy
Middle East Trophy	GT3 Am Teams: (United States) No. 85 CP Racing	2023–24 Middle East Trophy
Middle East Trophy	992: (Netherlands) Ivo Breukers; 992: (Netherlands) Rik Breukers; 992: (Netherlands) Luc Breukers; 992: (Switzerland) Fabian Danz	2023–24 Middle East Trophy
Middle East Trophy	992 Teams: (Netherlands) No. 909 Red Camel-Jordans.nl	2023–24 Middle East Trophy
Middle East Trophy	992 Am: (Germany) Julian Hanses; 992 Am: (Qatar) Abdulla Ali Al Khelaifi; 992 Am: (Qatar) Ibrahim Al Abdulghani; 992 Am: (Qatar) Ghanim Al Ali	2023–24 Middle East Trophy
Middle East Trophy	992 Am Teams: (Qatar) No. 931 QMMF by HRT	2023–24 Middle East Trophy
Middle East Trophy	GTX: (United Kingdom) Lawrence Tomlinson; GTX: (United Kingdom) Freddie Tomlinson; GTX: (United Kingdom) Michael Simpson	2023–24 Middle East Trophy
Middle East Trophy	GTX Teams: (United Kingdom) No. 795 Toro Verde	2023–24 Middle East Trophy
Middle East Trophy	GT4: (Kyrgyzstan) Andrey Solukovtsev; GT4: (Cyprus) Vasily Vladykhin	2023–24 Middle East Trophy
Middle East Trophy	GT4 Teams: (United Kingdom) No. 429 Century Motorsport	2023–24 Middle East Trophy
Middle East Trophy	TCE: (United Kingdom) James Kaye	2023–24 Middle East Trophy
Middle East Trophy	TCE Teams: (United Kingdom) No. 138 Simpson Motorsport	2023–24 Middle East Trophy
Middle East Trophy	TCR: (United Kingdom) James Kaye	2023–24 Middle East Trophy
Middle East Trophy	TCR Teams: (United Kingdom) No. 138 Simpson Motorsport	2023–24 Middle East Trophy
Middle East Trophy	TCX: (United Kingdom) Colin White; TCX: (United Kingdom) Owen Hizzey	2023–24 Middle East Trophy
Middle East Trophy	TCX Teams: (United Kingdom) No. 278 CWS Engineering	2023–24 Middle East Trophy
Prototype Cup Germany	(Germany) Valentino Catalano (Germany) Markus Pommer	2024 Prototype Cup Germany
Prototype Cup Germany	Teams: (Germany) Gebhardt Motorsport	2024 Prototype Cup Germany
Prototype Cup Germany	Trophy: (Estonia) Antti Rammo	2024 Prototype Cup Germany
Prototype Cup Germany	Junior: (United States) Danny Soufi	2024 Prototype Cup Germany
Prototype Winter Series	Class 3: (United States) Danny Soufi	2024 Prototype Winter Series
Prototype Winter Series	Class 3 Teams: (Germany) No. 7 Konrad Motorsport	2024 Prototype Winter Series
Prototype Winter Series	Class 4: (France) Iko Segret	2024 Prototype Winter Series
Prototype Winter Series	Class 4 Teams: (France) No. 6 ANS Motorsport	2024 Prototype Winter Series
Prototype Winter Series	Class N: (Switzerland) Kevin Rabin	2024 Prototype Winter Series
Prototype Winter Series	Class N Teams: (France) No. 71 ANS Motorsport	2024 Prototype Winter Series
Sports Car Championship Canada	TCR: (Canada) Richard Boake	2024 Sports Car Championship Canada
Sports Car Championship Canada	GT4: (Canada) Jack Polito	2024 Sports Car Championship Canada
Sports Car Championship Canada	TCA: (Canada) Eric Kunz	2024 Sports Car Championship Canada
SRO Japan Cup	GT3: (Japan) Shinichi Takagi; GT3: (Japan) Daisuke Yamawaki	2024 SRO Japan Cup
SRO Japan Cup	GT3 Teams: (Japan) K-tunes Racing	2024 SRO Japan Cup
SRO Japan Cup	GT3 Pro-Am: (Japan) Shinichi Takagi; GT3 Pro-Am: (Japan) Daisuke Yamawaki	2024 SRO Japan Cup
SRO Japan Cup	GT3 Am: (Japan) Tadao Uematsu	2024 SRO Japan Cup
SRO Japan Cup	GTC: (Japan) Makoto Haga	2024 SRO Japan Cup
SRO Japan Cup	GTC Pro-Am: (Japan) Masataka Inoue; GTC Pro-Am: (Japan) Kiwamu Katayama	2024 SRO Japan Cup
SRO Japan Cup	GTC Am: (Japan) Makoto Haga	2024 SRO Japan Cup
SRO Japan Cup	GT4: (Japan) Takeshi Suehiro	2024 SRO Japan Cup
SRO Japan Cup	GT4 Teams: (Japan) Wakayama Toyota with Hojust Racing	2024 SRO Japan Cup
SRO Japan Cup	GT4 Silver-Am Cup: (Japan) Takeshi Suehiro	2024 SRO Japan Cup
SRO Japan Cup	GT4 Am: (Japan) Kenji Hama; GT4 Am: (Japan) Tatsuya Hoshino	2024 SRO Japan Cup
Super GT Series	GT500: (Japan) Sho Tsuboi; GT500: (Japan) Kenta Yamashita	2024 Super GT Series
Super GT Series	GT500 Teams: (Japan) No. 36 TGR Team au TOM'S	2024 Super GT Series
Super GT Series	GT300: (Japan) Takashi Kogure; GT300: (Japan) Yuya Motojima	2024 Super GT Series
Super GT Series	GT300 Teams: (Japan) No. 88 JLOC	2024 Super GT Series
Super Taikyu Series	ST-X: (Japan) No. 1 Zhongsheng ROOKIE Racing	2024 Super Taikyu Series
Super Taikyu Series	ST-Z: (Japan) No. 52 Saitama Green Brave	2024 Super Taikyu Series
Super Taikyu Series	ST-TCR: (Japan) No. 98 M&K Racing	2024 Super Taikyu Series
Super Taikyu Series	ST-Q: (Japan) No. 92 GR Spirit Racing	2024 Super Taikyu Series
Super Taikyu Series	ST-1: (Japan) No. 2 K's Frontier KTM Cars	2024 Super Taikyu Series
Super Taikyu Series	ST-2: (Japan) No. 225 KTMS	2024 Super Taikyu Series
Super Taikyu Series	ST-3: (Japan) No. 39 Tracy Sports with Delta	2024 Super Taikyu Series
Super Taikyu Series	ST-4: (Japan) No. 3 Endless Sports	2024 Super Taikyu Series
Super Taikyu Series	ST-5: (Japan) No. 17 Team NOPRO	2024 Super Taikyu Series
TC France Series	TCR: (France) Julien Paget	2024 TC France Series
TC France Series	TCR Teams: (France) Team Clairet Sport	2024 TC France Series
TC France Series	TC: (France) Viny Beltramelli	2024 TC France Series
TC France Series	TC Teams: (France) JSB Compétition	2024 TC France Series
TC France Series	TCA: (France) Franck Labescat	2024 TC France Series
TC France Series	TCA Teams: (France) CDRS	2024 TC France Series
TC France Series	TCA-2: (France) Quentin Prudent	2024 TC France Series
TC France Series	TCA-2 Teams: (France) ADWShop Motorsport	2024 TC France Series
TC France Series	TCA Light: (France) Colin Boreau	2024 TC France Series
TC France Series	TCA Light Teams: (France) Boreau Team Sport by JSB	2024 TC France Series
TC France Series	GT Light: (France) Nicco Ferrarin	2024 TC France Series
TC France Series	GT Light Teams: (France) CDRS	2024 TC France Series
TC France Series	GT Academy: (France) Ethan Gialdini	2024 TC France Series
TC France Series	GT Academy Teams: (France) Tierce Racing	2024 TC France Series
Toyota Finance 86 Championship	(New Zealand) Tom Bewley	2023–24 Toyota Finance 86 Championship
Toyota Gazoo Racing Australia 86 Series	(Australia) Max Geoghegan	2024 Toyota Gazoo Racing Australia 86 Series
Ultimate Cup Series	European Endurance Prototype Cup Overall: (Switzerland) Axel Gnos; European Endurance Prototype Cup Overall: (Greece) Georgios Kolovos	2024 Ultimate Cup Series
Ultimate Cup Series	LMP3 drivers: (Switzerland) Axel Gnos; LMP3 drivers: (Greece) Georgios Kolovos	2024 Ultimate Cup Series
Ultimate Cup Series	LMP3 Teams: (Poland) Team Virage	2024 Ultimate Cup Series
Ultimate Cup Series	LMP3 Ultimate: (Austria) Martin Böhm; LMP3 Ultimate: (Austria) Andreas Fojtik	2024 Ultimate Cup Series
Ultimate Cup Series	NP02 drivers: (Switzerland) Luis Sanjuan; NP02 drivers: (France) Eric Trouillet	2024 Ultimate Cup Series
Ultimate Cup Series	NP02 Teams: (France) Graff Racing	2024 Ultimate Cup Series
Ultimate Cup Series	NP02 Ultimate: (France) Denis Caillon; NP02 Ultimate: (France) Philippe Thirion	2024 Ultimate Cup Series
Ultimate Cup Series	GT Endurance Cup Overall: (France) Jean-Bernard Bouvet; GT Endurance Cup Overall: (France) Jean-Paul Pagny	2024 Ultimate Cup Series
Ultimate Cup Series	GT Endurance Cup UCS1 drivers: (France) Jean-Bernard Bouvet; GT Endurance Cup UCS1 drivers: (France) Jean-Paul Pagny	2024 Ultimate Cup Series
Ultimate Cup Series	GT Endurance Cup UCS3 drivers: (France) Christophe Derouineau; GT Endurance Cup UCS3 drivers: (France) Stéphane Gouverneur; GT Endurance Cup UCS3 drivers: (France) Jimmy Luminier	2024 Ultimate Cup Series
Ultimate Cup Series	GT Endurance Cup PC drivers: (France) Olivier Favre; GT Endurance Cup PC drivers: (France) Yann Penlou	2024 Ultimate Cup Series
Ultimate Cup Series	GT Endurance Cup UCS4 drivers: (Belgium) Daniel Waszczinsky	2024 Ultimate Cup Series
Ultimate Cup Series	GT Endurance Cup UCS Light drivers: (France) Julien Bounie; GT Endurance Cup UCS Light drivers: (France) Benoit Marion; GT Endurance Cup UCS Light drivers: (France) Olivier Martinez	2024 Ultimate Cup Series
Ultimate Cup Series	GT Endurance Cup Teams: (France) 2B Autosport	2024 Ultimate Cup Series
Ultimate Cup Series	GT-Sprint Cup Overall: (Italy) Francesco Atzori	2024 Ultimate Cup Series
Ultimate Cup Series	GT-Sprint Cup UCS1 drivers: (Italy) Francesco Atzori	2024 Ultimate Cup Series
Ultimate Cup Series	GT-Sprint Cup UCS2 drivers: (Mexico) Alfredo Hernandez	2024 Ultimate Cup Series
Ultimate Cup Series	GT-Sprint Cup UCS3 drivers: (Republic of Ireland) Lyle Schofield	2024 Ultimate Cup Series
Ultimate Cup Series	GT-Sprint Cup PC drivers: (France) César Vandewoestyne	2024 Ultimate Cup Series
Ultimate Cup Series	GT-Sprint Cup UCS4 drivers: (France) Pierre Arraou	2024 Ultimate Cup Series
Ultimate Cup Series	GT-Sprint Cup UCS Light drivers: (France) Marine Pidoux	2024 Ultimate Cup Series
Ultimate Cup Series	GT-Sprint Cup Teams: TBD	2024 Ultimate Cup Series
Ultimate Cup Series	GT-Sprint Cup Ultimate Cavalino Tridente Cup: (Republic of Ireland) Lyle Schofield	2024 Ultimate Cup Series
Ultimate Cup Series	GT-Sprint Cup Ultimate Cavalino Tridente Cup Teams': (Italy) SR&R SRL	2024 Ultimate Cup Series
Porsche Supercup, Porsche Carrera Cup, GT3 Cup Challenge and Porsche Sprint Challenge
Porsche Supercup	(Netherlands) Larry ten Voorde	2024 Porsche Supercup
Porsche Supercup	Teams: (France) Schumacher CLRT	2024 Porsche Supercup
Porsche Supercup	Rookies: (Netherlands) Robert de Haan	2024 Porsche Supercup
Porsche Carrera Cup Asia	(France) Alessandro Ghiretti	2024 Porsche Carrera Cup Asia
Porsche Carrera Cup Asia	Dealer Trophy: (Hong Kong) Team Jebsen	2024 Porsche Carrera Cup Asia
Porsche Carrera Cup Asia	Pro-Am: (China) Bao Jinlong	2024 Porsche Carrera Cup Asia
Porsche Carrera Cup Asia	Am: (Hong Kong) Eric Kwong	2024 Porsche Carrera Cup Asia
Porsche Carrera Cup Australia	(Australia) Harri Jones	2024 Porsche Carrera Cup Australia
Porsche Carrera Cup Australia	Pro-Am: (Australia) Adrian Flack	2024 Porsche Carrera Cup Australia
Porsche Carrera Cup Australia	Pro Endurance: (Australia) Jackson Walls	2024 Porsche Carrera Cup Australia
Porsche Carrera Cup Australia	Pro-Am Endurance: (Australia) Adrian Flack	2024 Porsche Carrera Cup Australia
Porsche Carrera Cup Australia	Junior: (Australia) Jackson Walls	2024 Porsche Carrera Cup Australia
Porsche Carrera Cup Benelux	(Netherlands) Dirk Schouten	2024 Porsche Carrera Cup Benelux
Porsche Carrera Cup Benelux	Teams: (Belgium) Q1-trackracing	2024 Porsche Carrera Cup Benelux
Porsche Carrera Cup Benelux	Pro-Am: (Finland) Jani Käkelä	2024 Porsche Carrera Cup Benelux
Porsche Carrera Cup Benelux	Rookies: (Belgium) Kobe Pauwels	2024 Porsche Carrera Cup Benelux
Porsche Carrera Cup Brasil	(Brazil) Marçal Müller	2024 Porsche Carrera Cup Brasil
Porsche Carrera Cup Brasil	Sport: (Brazil) Peter Ferter	2024 Porsche Carrera Cup Brasil
Porsche Carrera Cup Brasil	Rookies: (Brazil) Israel Salmen	2024 Porsche Carrera Cup Brasil
Porsche Carrera Cup Brasil	Endurance: (Brazil) Werner Neugebauer	2024 Porsche Carrera Cup Brasil
Porsche Carrera Cup Brasil	Endurance Sport: (Brazil) Rouman Ziemkiewicz	2024 Porsche Carrera Cup Brasil
Porsche Carrera Cup Brasil	Endurance Rookies: (Brazil) Bruno Campos	2024 Porsche Carrera Cup Brasil
Porsche Sprint Challenge Brasil	(Brazil) Miguel Mariotti	2024 Porsche Sprint Challenge Brasil
Porsche Sprint Challenge Brasil	Sport: (Brazil) Célio Brasil	2024 Porsche Sprint Challenge Brasil
Porsche Sprint Challenge Brasil	Rookies: (Brazil) Caio Chaves	2024 Porsche Sprint Challenge Brasil
Porsche Sprint Challenge Brasil	Trophy: (Brazil) José Moura Neto	2024 Porsche Sprint Challenge Brasil
Porsche Sprint Challenge Brasil	Trophy Sport: (Brazil) Neto Heil	2024 Porsche Sprint Challenge Brasil
Porsche Sprint Challenge Brasil	Endurance: (Brazil) Sadak Leite	2024 Porsche Sprint Challenge Brasil
Porsche Sprint Challenge Brasil	Endurance Sport: (Brazil) Alceu Feldmann Neto	2024 Porsche Sprint Challenge Brasil
Porsche Sprint Challenge Brasil	Endurance Rookies: (Brazil) Alceu Feldmann Neto	2024 Porsche Sprint Challenge Brasil
Porsche Carrera Cup France	(France) Alessandro Ghiretti	2024 Porsche Carrera Cup France
Porsche Carrera Cup France	Teams: (France) Schumacher CLRT	2024 Porsche Carrera Cup France
Porsche Carrera Cup France	Pro-Am: (France) Marc Guillot	2024 Porsche Carrera Cup France
Porsche Carrera Cup France	Am: (France) Cyril Caillo	2024 Porsche Carrera Cup France
Porsche Carrera Cup France	Rookie: (France) Marcus Amand	2024 Porsche Carrera Cup France
Porsche Carrera Cup Germany	(Netherlands) Larry ten Voorde	2024 Porsche Carrera Cup Germany
Porsche Carrera Cup Germany	Teams: (Germany) Proton Huber Competition	2024 Porsche Carrera Cup Germany
Porsche Carrera Cup Germany	Pro-Am: (Germany) Sören Spreng	2024 Porsche Carrera Cup Germany
Porsche Carrera Cup Germany	Rookie: (Netherlands) Flynt Schuring	2024 Porsche Carrera Cup Germany
Porsche Carrera Cup Great Britain	(United Kingdom) George Gamble	2024 Porsche Carrera Cup Great Britain
Porsche Carrera Cup Great Britain	Teams: (United Kingdom) Team Parker Racing	2024 Porsche Carrera Cup Great Britain
Porsche Carrera Cup Great Britain	Pro-Am: (United Kingdom) Angus Whiteside	2024 Porsche Carrera Cup Great Britain
Porsche Carrera Cup Great Britain	Am: (United Kingdom) Lee Mowle	2024 Porsche Carrera Cup Great Britain
Porsche Carrera Cup Great Britain	Rookie: (United Kingdom) Matthew Rees	2024 Porsche Carrera Cup Great Britain
Porsche Carrera Cup Italia	(South Africa) Keagan Masters	2024 Porsche Carrera Cup Italia
Porsche Carrera Cup Italia	Teams: (Italy) Target Competition	2024 Porsche Carrera Cup Italia
Porsche Carrera Cup Italia	Rookie: (Germany) Lirim Zendeli	2024 Porsche Carrera Cup Italia
Porsche Carrera Cup Italia	Michelin Cup: (Italy) Francesco Maria Fenici	2024 Porsche Carrera Cup Italia
Porsche Carrera Cup Japan	(Japan) Reimei Ito	2024 Porsche Carrera Cup Japan
Porsche Carrera Cup Japan	Teams: (Japan) Bingo Racing	2024 Porsche Carrera Cup Japan
Porsche Carrera Cup Japan	Pro-Am: (Japan) Shinji Takei	2024 Porsche Carrera Cup Japan
Porsche Carrera Cup Japan	Am: (Chinese Taipei) Tiger Wu	2024 Porsche Carrera Cup Japan
Porsche Carrera Cup Middle East	(Germany) Theo Oeverhaus	2023–24 Porsche Carrera Cup Middle East
Porsche Carrera Cup Middle East	Pro-Am: (Germany) Sören Spreng	2023–24 Porsche Carrera Cup Middle East
Porsche Carrera Cup Middle East	Am: (Italy) Sebastian Gorga	2023–24 Porsche Carrera Cup Middle East
Porsche Carrera Cup Middle East	Rookies: (Germany) Theo Oeverhaus	2023–24 Porsche Carrera Cup Middle East
Porsche Carrera Cup Middle East	Teams: (Netherlands) Team GP Elite	2023–24 Porsche Carrera Cup Middle East
Porsche Carrera Cup North America	(Netherlands) Loek Hartog	2024 Porsche Carrera Cup North America
Porsche Carrera Cup North America	Teams: (United States) Kellymoss	2024 Porsche Carrera Cup North America
Porsche Carrera Cup North America	Pro-Am: (United States) Alan Metni	2024 Porsche Carrera Cup North America
Porsche Carrera Cup North America	Masters: (United States) Matt Halcome	2024 Porsche Carrera Cup North America
Porsche Carrera Cup North America	Junior: (Netherlands) Loek Hartog	2024 Porsche Carrera Cup North America
Porsche Carrera Cup North America	Female: (United States) Sabré Cook	2024 Porsche Carrera Cup North America
Porsche Carrera Cup Scandinavia	(Sweden) Lukas Sundahl	2024 Porsche Carrera Cup Scandinavia
Porsche Carrera Cup Scandinavia	Teams: (Sweden) Micke Kågered Racing	2024 Porsche Carrera Cup Scandinavia
Porsche Carrera Cup Scandinavia	Pro-Am: (Sweden) Kjelle Lejonkrans	2024 Porsche Carrera Cup Scandinavia
Porsche Sprint Challenge Great Britain	RS Pro: (United Kingdom) Sebastian Hopkins	2024 Porsche Sprint Challenge Great Britain
Porsche Sprint Challenge Great Britain	RS Teams: (United Kingdom) Team Parker Racing	2024 Porsche Sprint Challenge Great Britain
Porsche Sprint Challenge Great Britain	RS Am: (United Kingdom) Jacob Tofts	2024 Porsche Sprint Challenge Great Britain
Porsche Sprint Challenge Great Britain	Clubsport Pro: (United Kingdom) Oscar Dix	2024 Porsche Sprint Challenge Great Britain
Porsche Sprint Challenge Great Britain	Clubsport Teams: (United Kingdom) Team Parker Racing	2024 Porsche Sprint Challenge Great Britain
Porsche Sprint Challenge Great Britain	Clubsport Am: (United Kingdom) Jonathan Beeson	2024 Porsche Sprint Challenge Great Britain
Porsche Sprint Challenge Southern Europe	(Israel) Ariel Levi	2024 Porsche Sprint Challenge Southern Europe
Porsche Sprint Challenge Southern Europe	Pro-Am: (Estonia) Alexander Reimann	2024 Porsche Sprint Challenge Southern Europe

== Stock car racing ==
Series	Champion	Refer
NASCAR Cup Series	(United States) Joey Logano	2024 NASCAR Cup Series
NASCAR Cup Series	Manufacturers: (United States) Ford	2024 NASCAR Cup Series
NASCAR Xfinity Series	(United States) Justin Allgaier	2024 NASCAR Xfinity Series
NASCAR Xfinity Series	Manufacturers: (United States) Chevrolet	2024 NASCAR Xfinity Series
NASCAR Craftsman Truck Series	(United States) Ty Majeski	2024 NASCAR Craftsman Truck Series
NASCAR Craftsman Truck Series	Manufacturers: (United States) Chevrolet	2024 NASCAR Craftsman Truck Series
NASCAR Canada Series	(Canada) Marc-Antoine Camirand	2024 NASCAR Canada Series
NASCAR Canada Series	Manufacturers: (United States) Chevrolet	2024 NASCAR Canada Series
NASCAR Mexico Series	(Mexico) Rubén García Jr.	2024 NASCAR Mexico Series
NASCAR Whelen Euro Series	EuroNASCAR PRO: (Italy) Vittorio Ghirelli	2024 NASCAR Whelen Euro Series
NASCAR Whelen Euro Series	EuroNASCAR 2: (Czech Republic) Martin Doubek	2024 NASCAR Whelen Euro Series
NASCAR Whelen Euro Series	Endurance: (France) #3 RDV Competition ( (France) Paul Jouffreau & (Austria) Patrick Schober)	2024 NASCAR Whelen Euro Series
NASCAR Whelen Euro Series	Club Challenge: (Italy) Federico Monti	2024 NASCAR Whelen Euro Series
NASCAR Whelen Modified Tour	(United States) Justin Bonsignore	2024 NASCAR Whelen Modified Tour
ARCA Menards Series	(Mexico) Andrés Pérez de Lara	2024 ARCA Menards Series
ARCA Menards Series East	(United States) William Sawalich	2024 ARCA Menards Series East
ARCA Menards Series West	(United States) Sean Hingorani	2024 ARCA Menards Series West
SMART Modified Tour	(United States) Luke Baldwin	2024 SMART Modified Tour
Turismo Carretera	(Argentina) Julián Santero	2024 Turismo Carretera

== Touring car racing ==
Series	Champion	Refer
British Touring Car Championship	(United Kingdom) Jake Hill	2024 British Touring Car Championship
British Touring Car Championship	Teams: (United Kingdom) NAPA Racing UK	2024 British Touring Car Championship
British Touring Car Championship	Manufacturers: (Germany) BMW	2024 British Touring Car Championship
British Touring Car Championship	Independent: (Republic of Ireland) Árón Taylor-Smith	2024 British Touring Car Championship
British Touring Car Championship	Independent Teams: (United Kingdom) Power Maxed Racing	2024 British Touring Car Championship
British Touring Car Championship	Jack Sears Trophy: (United Kingdom) Mikey Doble	2024 British Touring Car Championship
Scandinavian Touring Car Championship	(Sweden) Mikael Karlsson	2024 STCC Scandinavia Touring Car Championship
Scandinavian Touring Car Championship	Teams: (Sweden) Brink Motorsport	2024 STCC Scandinavia Touring Car Championship
Stock Car Pro Series	(Brazil) Gabriel Casagrande	2024 Stock Car Pro Series
Stock Car Pro Series	Teams: (Brazil) TMG Racing	2024 Stock Car Pro Series
Stock Series	(Brazil) Arthur Gama	2024 Stock Series
Stock Series	Teams: (Brazil) Artcon Racing	2024 Stock Series
Supercars Championship	(Australia) Will Brown	2024 Supercars Championship
Supercars Championship	Teams: (Australia) Triple Eight Race Engineering	2024 Supercars Championship
Supercars Championship	Manufacturers: (United States) Ford	2024 Supercars Championship
Super2 Series	(Australia) Zach Bates	2024 Super2 Series
Super2 Series	Super3: (Australia) Cody Burcher	2024 Super2 Series
TC America Series	TCX: (United States) Chris Walsh	2024 TC America Series
TC America Series	TCX Teams: (United States) Carrus Callas Raceteam	2024 TC America Series
TC America Series	TC: (United States) Jeff Ricca	2024 TC America Series
TC America Series	TC Teams: (United States) Ricca Autosport	2024 TC America Series
TC America Series	TCA: (Canada) P.J. Groenke	2024 TC America Series
TC America Series	TCA Teams: (United States) MINI JCW Team	2024 TC America Series
TC2000 Championship	(Argentina) Leonel Pernía	2024 TC2000 Championship
TC2000 Championship	Teams: (Argentina) Ambrogio Racing	2024 TC2000 Championship
TC2000 Championship	Manufacturers: (France) Renault	2024 TC2000 Championship
Renault Clio Cup
Renault Clio Cup Series	(Italy) Gabriele Torelli	2024 Renault Clio Cup Series
Renault Clio Cup Series	Juniors: (Italy) Damiano Puccetti	2024 Renault Clio Cup Series
Renault Clio Cup Series	Challengers: (France) Guillaume Maio	2024 Renault Clio Cup Series
Renault Clio Cup Series	Gentlemen: (France) Mickaël Carrée	2024 Renault Clio Cup Series
Renault Clio Cup España	(Italy) Damiano Puccetti	2024 Renault Clio Cup España
Renault Clio Cup España	Gentlemen: (France) Samuel Chaligne	2024 Renault Clio Cup España
Renault Clio Cup France	(Italy) Gabriele Torelli	2024 Renault Clio Cup France
Renault Clio Cup France	Juniors: (France) Florian Venturi	2024 Renault Clio Cup France
Renault Clio Cup France	Challengers: (France) Calvin Comte	2024 Renault Clio Cup France
Renault Clio Cup France	Gentlemen: (France) Mickaël Carrée	2024 Renault Clio Cup France
Renault Clio Cup Italia	(France) Anthony Jurado	2024 Renault Clio Cup Italia
Renault Clio Cup Italia	Juniors: (Italy) Leonardo Arduini	2024 Renault Clio Cup Italia
Renault Clio Cup Italia	Challengers: (Italy) Alex Lancellotti	2024 Renault Clio Cup Italia
Renault Clio Cup Italia	Gentlemen: (Italy) Cristian Ricciarini	2024 Renault Clio Cup Italia
Renault Clio Cup Mid-Europe	(Netherlands) Lorenzo van Riet	2024 Renault Clio Cup Mid-Europe
Renault Clio Cup Mid-Europe	Juniors: (Netherlands) Mauro Polderman	2024 Renault Clio Cup Mid-Europe
Renault Clio Cup Mid-Europe	Challengers: (Netherlands) Lorenzo van Riet	2024 Renault Clio Cup Mid-Europe
TCR
TCR World Tour	(Hungary) Norbert Michelisz	2024 TCR World Tour
TCR World Tour	Teams: (Sweden) Cyan Racing Lynk & Co	2024 TCR World Tour
TCR Asia Series	(China) Zhang Zhendong	2024 TCR Asia Series
TCR Asia Series	Teams: (China) Hyundai N Team Z.Speed	2024 TCR Asia Series
TCR Asia Series	TCR Cup: (Indonesia) Benny Santosa	2024 TCR Asia Series
TCR Australia Touring Car Series	(Australia) Josh Buchan	2024 TCR Australia Touring Car Series
TCR Eastern Europe Trophy	(Slovakia) Maťo Homola	2024 TCR Eastern Europe Trophy
TCR Eastern Europe Trophy	Teams: (Czech Republic) Janik Motorsport	2024 TCR Eastern Europe Trophy
TCR Eastern Europe Trophy	Junior: (Hungary) Attila Bucsi	2024 TCR Eastern Europe Trophy
TCR Europe Touring Car Series	(Argentina) Franco Girolami	2024 TCR Europe Touring Car Series
TCR Europe Touring Car Series	Teams: (Estonia) ALM Motorsport	2024 TCR Europe Touring Car Series
TCR Europe Touring Car Series	Rookies: (Argentina) Ignacio Montenegro	2024 TCR Europe Touring Car Series
TCR Europe Touring Car Series	Diamond Trophy: (Spain) Felipe Fernández	2024 TCR Europe Touring Car Series
TCR Italy Touring Car Championship	(Canada) Nicolas Taylor	2024 TCR Italy Touring Car Championship
TCR Italy Touring Car Championship	Teams: (Italy) Aikoa Racing	2024 TCR Italy Touring Car Championship
TCR Italy Touring Car Championship	Rookie: (Canada) Nicolas Taylor	2024 TCR Italy Touring Car Championship
TCR Italy Touring Car Championship	Master: (Italy) Nicola Baldan	2024 TCR Italy Touring Car Championship
TCR Italy Touring Car Championship	Under-25: (Estonia) Ruben Volt	2024 TCR Italy Touring Car Championship
TCR Italy Touring Car Championship	DSG: (Italy) Luca Franca	2024 TCR Italy Touring Car Championship
TCR Italy Touring Car Championship	DSG Teams: (Italy) Aikoa Racing	2024 TCR Italy Touring Car Championship
TCR Italy Touring Car Championship	DSG Master: (Italy) Fabio Antonello	2024 TCR Italy Touring Car Championship
TCR Italy Touring Car Championship	DSG Under-25: (Italy) Luca Verdi	2024 TCR Italy Touring Car Championship
TCR South America Touring Car Championship	(Brazil) Pedro Cardoso	2024 TCR South America Touring Car Championship
TCR South America Touring Car Championship	Teams: (Argentina) PMO Racing	2024 TCR South America Touring Car Championship
TCR South America Touring Car Championship	Trophy: (Uruguay) Enrique Maglione	2024 TCR South America Touring Car Championship
TCR Taiwan Series	(Taiwan) Kao Tzu-Lung	2024 TCR Taiwan Series
TCR Taiwan Series	Teams: (Taiwan) Liming Racing	2024 TCR Taiwan Series
TCR UK Touring Car Championship	(United Kingdom) Carl Boardley	2024 TCR UK Touring Car Championship
TCR UK Touring Car Championship	Teams: (United Kingdom) JH Racing	2024 TCR UK Touring Car Championship

== Truck racing ==
Series	Champion	Refer
European Truck Racing Championship	(Hungary) Norbert Kiss	2024 European Truck Racing Championship
European Truck Racing Championship	Teams: (Hungary) Révész Racing	2024 European Truck Racing Championship
European Truck Racing Championship	Chrome: (Portugal) José Eduardo Rodrigues	2024 European Truck Racing Championship
Stadium Super Trucks	(United States) Robby Gordon	2024 Stadium Super Trucks
SuperUtes Series	(Australia) Adam Marjoram	2024 SuperUtes Series
