= Brad Majman =

Australian racing driver (born 2009)

- Nationality: (Australia) Australian
- Born: Bradley Majman; 14 April 2009 (age 17) Melbourne, Victoria, Australia

USF2000 Championship career
- Debut season: 2025
- Current team: Pabst Racing
- Car number: 22
- Former teams: Jay Howard Driver Development
- Starts: 31
- Wins: 3
- Podiums: 8
- Poles: 2
- Fastest laps: 5
- Best finish: 2nd in 2026

Previous series
- 2024: Ligier JS F4 Series

Bradley Majman (born 14 April 2009) is an Australian racing driver who last competed for Pabst Racing in the USF2000 Championship.

Majman is a member of A14 Management, overseen by two-time Formula One world champion Fernando Alonso.

== Career ==
Majman began karting at the age of five, before making his competitive debut in 2016. Primarily competing in the Australian Kart Championship until 2024, Majman most notably took the 2024 Junior Top Guns title in KA2, as well as finishing third in the national series in 2023 in the same class. Internationally, Majman won the 2019 SKUSA SuperNationals in the Micro Swift class, competed for Shamick Racing an extensive European programme between 2021 and 2022, and also represented Australia in the 2023 Asia Pacific Motorsport Games.

In 2024, Majman made his single-seater debut in select rounds of the Formula Pro USA Western Championship for Kiwi Motorsports, in which he scored two wins in the FPUSA-4 class. Majman's main campaign that year was in the Ligier JS F4 Series for Crosslink Kiwi Motorsport. In his only season in the series, Majman scored his first podium at Road America, before winning all three races at New Jersey Motorsports Park to end the season fifth overall.

The following year, Majman joined Jay Howard Driver Development to make his debut in the USF2000 Championship. In his rookie season in the series, Majman took a best result of third at Indianapolis Raceway Park and scored three top fives in the last five races en route to a 12th-place championship finish at the end of the year. Switching to Pabst Racing for the 2026 season, Majman finished fourth in both races at St. Petersburg, before taking his maiden series win in race three at Indianapolis. Majman then finished second from pole in the opening two races at Road America and secured the win in race three, as well as a third-place finish at Mid-Ohio to enter the final three rounds second in points. In those final three rounds, Majman picked up a win at Markham as he secured runner-up honours in points.

== Karting record ==
=== Karting career summary ===
Season	Series	Team	Position
2019	Australian Kart Championship – Cadet 12		47th
2019	SKUSA SuperNationals – Micro Swift		1st
2020	Australian Kart Championship – Cadet 12		23rd
2021	Champions of the Future – OK-J	Shamick Europe	142nd
2021	Karting World Championship – OK-J	Shamick Europe	99th
2021	South Garda Winter Cup – OK-J	Shamick Europe	35th
2021	WSK Final Cup – OK-J	Shamick Europe	NC
2022	WSK Champions Cup – OK-J	Shamick Europe	19th
2022	WSK Super Master Series – OK-J	Shamick Europe	74th
2022	Champions of the Future Euro Series – OK-J	Shamick Europe	93rd
2022	Karting European Championship – OK-J	Shamick Europe	102nd
2022	WSK Euro Series – OK-J	Shamick Europe	57th
2022	Karting World Championship – OK-J	Shamick Europe	80th
2022	WSK Open Cup – OK-J	Shamick Europe	19th
2022	Trofeo Delle Industrie – OK-J	Shamick Europe	20th
2022	WSK Final Cup – OK-J	Shamick Europe	29th
2022	Australian Kart Championship – KA2		12th
2023	Australian Kart Championship – KA2		3rd
2024	Australian Kart Championship – KZ2		27th

== Racing record ==
=== Racing career summary ===
Season	Series	Team	Races	Wins	Poles	F/Laps	Podiums	Points	Position
2024	Formula Pro USA Western Championship – FPUSA-4	Kiwi Motorsports	6	2	0	2	4	110	**3rd**
2024	Ligier JS F4 Series	Crosslink Kiwi Motorsport	15	3	0	2	3	134	5th
2025	USF2000 Championship	Jay Howard Driver Development	13	0	0	0	1	127	12th
2026	USF2000 Championship	Pabst Racing	18	3	2	5	7	354	**2nd**

=== Complete Ligier JS F4 Series results ===
(key) (Races in bold indicate pole position; races in italics indicate fastest lap)

Year	Team	1	2	3	4	5	6	7	8	9	10	11	12	13	14	15	DC	Points
2024	Crosslink Kiwi Motorsport	NOL; 1; 5	NOL; 2; 5	NOL; 3; 9	ROA; 1; 2	ROA; 2 Ret	ROA; 3; 9	MOH; 1; 7	MOH; 2; 6	MOH; 3; 8	NJM; 1; 1	NJM; 2; 1	NJM; 3; 1	COA; 1; 12	COA; 2 Ret	COA; 3; 10	5th	134

=== American open-wheel racing results ===
==== USF2000 Championship ====
(key) (Races in bold indicate pole position) (Races in italics indicate fastest lap) (Races with * indicate most race laps led)

Year	Team	1	2	3	4	5	6	7	8	9	10	11	12	13	14	15	16	17	18	Rank	Points
2025	Jay Howard Driver Development	STP; 1; 19	STP; 2; 5	NOL; 1; 4	NOL; 2; 16	NOL; 3; 13	IMS; 1; 18	IMS; 2; 6	IRP; 3	ROA; 1	ROA; 2	MOH; 1 Wth	MOH; 2 Wth	MOH; 3 Wth	TOR; 1; 5	TOR; 2; 5	POR; 1; 9	POR; 2; 15	POR; 3; 5	12th	171
2026	Pabst Racing	STP; 1; 4	STP; 2; 4	IMS; 1; 15	IMS; 2; 5	IMS; 3; 1*	IRP; 5	**ROA1**; **1**; 2	**ROA1**; **2**; 2	ROA1; 3; 1*	MOH; 1; 3	MOH; 2; 4	POR; 1; 6	POR; 2; 13	MAR; 1; 2	MAR; 2; 1*	ROA2; 1; 18	ROA2; 2; 13	ROA2; 3; 5	2nd	354
