= 2024 Formula Pro USA Western Championship =

Season of motorsports

The 2024 Formula Pro USA Western Series was the fifth season of the championship for Formula Regional and Formula 4 cars established in the West Coast of the United States. The championship was promoted and organized by Exclusive Racing and Exclusive Auctions, and was run under the same sporting regulations as the FIA-sanctioned Formula Regional Americas Championship and Formula 4 United States Championship.

It began in March, with the championship spanning six weekends until November. In the FPUSA-3 class for Formula Regional cars, Kiwi Motorsports driver Landan Matriano Lim won the championship at the penultimate race, while World Speed Motorsports driver Valentino Garbarino won the FPUSA-4 class championship with two races to spare.

== Teams and drivers ==
Drivers were able to enter either the FPUSA-3 or the FPUSA-4 class, with the former using a Ligier JS F3 car and the latter a Ligier JS-F4 car. All cars were powered by Honda and use Avon tires. A female-only class called Formula Pro Women's Racing Series was to be introduced, running alongside the main championship and also using the Ligier JS-F4, but it received no entries for any of the events.

Team	No.	Driver	Rounds
Formula Pro USA 3 (FPUSA-3) entries
Jensen Global Advisors	1	(United States) Jake Pollack	5
World Speed Motorsports	8	(United States) Frank Vezer	5
World Speed Motorsports	13	(United States) Larry Schnur	1–2, 4
World Speed Motorsports	37	(United States) Jay Horak	All
Kiwi Motorsports	02	(United States) Jett Bowling	2
Kiwi Motorsports	55	(United States) Jonathan Collins	3–4
Kiwi Motorsports	73	(United States) Landan Matriano Lim	1–4, 6
Atlantic Racing Team	77	(Canada) James Lawley	1, 6
Crosslink Kiwi Motorsports	131	(United States) Barrett Wolfe	6
Formula Pro USA 4 (FPUSA-4) entries
World Motorsports	00	(United States) Alexander Cornfeld	2–4, 6
Jensen Global Advisors	1	(United States) Athan Sterling	4–6
Jensen Global Advisors	2	(United States) Ethan Brobston	4
Jensen Global Advisors	7	(United States) Robert Krayevsky	6
World Speed Motorsports	4	(United States) Valentino Garbarino	All
Kiwi Motorsports	74	(United States) Drew Szuch	1
Kiwi Motorsports	95	(Australia) Brad Majman	1–2, 4

== Race calendar ==
The 2024 calendar was held over twelve races spanning across six weekends. The series raced at the same four circuits as the previous year. A one-round winter series was scheduled to be held at the beginning of March, but it was instead converted into two days of open testing.

Round		Circuit	Date	Support bill	Map of circuit locations
1	R1	Thunderhill Raceway Park, Willows	March 23	San Francisco Region SCCA Series; Formula Car Challenge	2024 Formula Pro USA Western Championship is located in California
1	R2	Thunderhill Raceway Park, Willows	March 24	San Francisco Region SCCA Series; Formula Car Challenge	2024 Formula Pro USA Western Championship is located in California
2	R3	Thunderhill Raceway Park, Willows	April 20	SCCA Majors Championship; Formula Car Challenge	2024 Formula Pro USA Western Championship is located in California
2	R4	Thunderhill Raceway Park, Willows	April 21	SCCA Majors Championship; Formula Car Challenge	2024 Formula Pro USA Western Championship is located in California
3	R5	WeatherTech Raceway Laguna Seca, Monterey	June 8	San Francisco Region SCCA Series; Formula Car Challenge	2024 Formula Pro USA Western Championship is located in California
3	R6	WeatherTech Raceway Laguna Seca, Monterey	June 9	San Francisco Region SCCA Series; Formula Car Challenge	2024 Formula Pro USA Western Championship is located in California
4	R7	WeatherTech Raceway Laguna Seca, Monterey	July 6	San Francisco Region SCCA Series; Formula Car Challenge	2024 Formula Pro USA Western Championship is located in California
4	R8	WeatherTech Raceway Laguna Seca, Monterey	July 7	San Francisco Region SCCA Series; Formula Car Challenge	2024 Formula Pro USA Western Championship is located in California
5	R9	Sonoma Raceway, Sonoma	August 30	San Francisco Region SCCA Series; Formula Car Challenge	2024 Formula Pro USA Western Championship is located in California
5	R10	Sonoma Raceway, Sonoma	August 31	San Francisco Region SCCA Series; Formula Car Challenge	2024 Formula Pro USA Western Championship is located in California
6	R11	Buttonwillow Raceway Park, Buttonwillow	November 16	California Sports Car Club; Formula Car Challenge	2024 Formula Pro USA Western Championship is located in California
6	R12	Buttonwillow Raceway Park, Buttonwillow	November 17	California Sports Car Club; Formula Car Challenge	2024 Formula Pro USA Western Championship is located in California

== Season report ==
The 2024 season began at Thunderhill Raceway Park, where Kiwi Motorsports driver Landan Matriano Lim secured pole position for both races. Lim delivered a commanding performance in the F3 class, claiming victories in both events and recording the fastest lap in each. In the F4 class, the competition was closely contested, with Brad Majman of Kiwi Motorsports and Valentino Garbarino of World Speed Motorsports each winning a race, leaving the two tied on points at the end of the weekend.

In the second round, held at the same venue as the season's opening event, Lim extended his winning streak by claiming victory in the first race, while his teammate Jett Bowling secured first place in the second race. However, as Bowling did not participate in the first round, Lim was able to further increase his championship lead over Horak in second. Meanwhile, in the F4 class, Majman and Garbarino continued their rivalry, each earning wins and fastest laps to maintain their identical points progression.

The championship proceeded to Laguna Seca, where Lim delivered a commanding performance in the F3 class. He secured two pole positions, set two fastest laps and claimed two victories. Horak finished second in both events, leaving him 52 points behind Lim in the standings. In the F4 class, Majman did not participate, allowing Garbarino and Alexander Cornfeld of World Motorsports to each claim a win. Garbarino therefore capitalized on this opportunity to build up a 47-point gap over Majman.

The fourth round, also held at Laguna Seca, saw Lim continue his unchallenged dominance. He achieved another weekend sweep, securing 54 additional points and extending his lead, with Horak trailing by 73 points. In the F4 category, Jensen GA’s Athan Sterling made his series debut, immediately claiming two second-place finishes as Garbarino secured two more victories. Meanwhile, Majman returned to the competition but managed only fifth place in both races, enabling Garbarino to extend his lead to 81 points.

Sonoma Raceway hosted round five, and only three drivers entered the F3 class. Lim was not among them, leaving Jensen GA’s Jake Pollack to take both race wins on his debut weekend. Horak claimed two more second places to shorten Lim’s standings lead to 35 points ahead of the final event. The F4 class also saw only two competitors, with Cornfeld’s absence allowing Garbarino to notch two more race wins and claim the F4 class title in the process. Sterling, the only other F4 competitor, took two more second places.

The final round, held at Buttonwillow Raceway Park, saw Lim return to competition in style as he beat his teammate Barrett Wolfe to race one victory to clinch the championship. That allowed him to skip the second race, which was won by Atlantic Racing Team’s James Lawley, while two third places for Horak saw him finish the season 32 points behind Lim. The F4 class finished its season without any change at the top of the order, as the top two for both races were Garbarino ahead of Sterling for the third weekend in a row.

== Race results ==
Round		Circuit	Pole position	FPUSA-3		FPUSA-4	
Round		Circuit	Pole position	Fastest lap	Winning driver	Fastest lap	Winning driver
1	R1	Thunderhill Raceway Park	(United States) Landan Matriano Lim	(United States) Landan Matriano Lim	(United States) Landan Matriano Lim	(United States) Valentino Garbarino	(Australia) Brad Majman
1	R2	Thunderhill Raceway Park	(United States) Landan Matriano Lim	(United States) Landan Matriano Lim	(United States) Landan Matriano Lim	(Australia) Brad Majman	(United States) Valentino Garbarino
2	R3	Thunderhill Raceway Park	(United States) Landan Matriano Lim	(United States) Jett Bowling	(United States) Landan Matriano Lim	(United States) Valentino Garbarino	(Australia) Brad Majman
2	R4	Thunderhill Raceway Park	(United States) Jett Bowling	(United States) Jett Bowling	(United States) Jett Bowling	(Australia) Brad Majman	(United States) Valentino Garbarino
3	R5	WeatherTech Raceway Laguna Seca	(United States) Landan Matriano Lim	(United States) Landan Matriano Lim	(United States) Landan Matriano Lim	(United States) Valentino Garbarino	(United States) Alexander Cornfeld
3	R6	WeatherTech Raceway Laguna Seca	(United States) Landan Matriano Lim	(United States) Landan Matriano Lim	(United States) Landan Matriano Lim	(United States) Valentino Garbarino	(United States) Valentino Garbarino
4	R7	WeatherTech Raceway Laguna Seca	(United States) Landan Matriano Lim	(United States) Landan Matriano Lim	(United States) Landan Matriano Lim	(United States) Valentino Garbarino	(United States) Valentino Garbarino
4	R8	WeatherTech Raceway Laguna Seca	(United States) Landan Matriano Lim	(United States) Landan Matriano Lim	(United States) Landan Matriano Lim	(United States) Valentino Garbarino	(United States) Valentino Garbarino
5	R9	Sonoma Raceway	(United States) Jake Pollack	(United States) Jay Horak	(United States) Jake Pollack	(United States) Valentino Garbarino	(United States) Valentino Garbarino
5	R10	Sonoma Raceway	(United States) Jake Pollack	(United States) Jake Pollack	(United States) Jake Pollack	(United States) Valentino Garbarino	(United States) Valentino Garbarino
6	R11	Buttonwillow Raceway Park	(Canada) James Lawley	(United States) Landan Matriano Lim	(United States) Landan Matriano Lim	(United States) Valentino Garbarino	(United States) Valentino Garbarino
6	R12	Buttonwillow Raceway Park	(Canada) James Lawley	(Canada) James Lawley	(Canada) James Lawley	(United States) Valentino Garbarino	(United States) Valentino Garbarino

== Championship standings ==
Points were awarded as follows:

Position	**1st**	**2nd**	**3rd**	**4th**	**5th**	**6th**	**7th**	**8th**	**9th**	**10th**	**FL**
Points	25	18	15	12	10	8	6	4	2	1	2

=== Drivers' standings ===
Pos	Driver	THU1		THU2		LAG1		LAG2		SON		BUT		Pts
Pos	Driver	R1	R2	R3	R4	R5	R6	R7	R8	R9	R10	R11	R12	Pts
Formula Pro USA 3 (FPUSA-3)
1	(United States) Landan Matriano Lim	**1**	**1**	**1**	2	**1**	**1**	**1**	**1**			1	DNS	232
2	(United States) Jay Horak	3	2	3	3	2	2	2	3	2	2	3	3	200
3	(United States) Larry Schnur	4	3	4	4			3	2					84
4	(Canada) James Lawley	2	4									**4**	**1**	69
5	(United States) Jake Pollack									**1**	**1**			52
6	(United States) Jett Bowling			2	**1**									47
7	(United States) Jonathan Collins					3	3	4	DNS					42
8	(United States) Barrett Wolfe											2	2	36
9	(United States) Frank Vezer									3	3			30
Formula Pro USA 4 (FPUSA-4)
1	(United States) Valentino Garbarino	2	1	2	1	2	1	1	1	1	1	1	1	299
2	(United States) Alexander Cornfeld			3	3	1	2	4	3			3	DNS	115
3	(Australia) Brad Majman	1	2	1	2			5	5					110
4	(United States) Athan Sterling							2	2	2	2	2	2	108
5	(United States) Drew Szuch	3	3											30
=7	(United States) Ethan Brobston							3	4					27
=7	(United States) Robert Krayevsky											4	3	27
Pos	Driver	R1	R2	R3	R4	R5	R6	R7	R8	R9	R10	R11	R12	Pts
Pos	Driver	THU1		THU2		LAG1		LAG2		SON		BUT		Pts

Colour	Result
Gold	Winner
Silver	Second place
Bronze	Third place
Green	Points classification
Blue	Non-points classification
Blue	Non-classified finish (NC)
Purple	Retired, not classified (Ret)
Red	Did not qualify (DNQ)
Red	Did not pre-qualify (DNPQ)
Black	Disqualified (DSQ)
White	Did not start (DNS)
White	Withdrew (WD)
White	Race cancelled (C)
Blank	Did not practice (DNP)
Blank	Did not arrive (DNA)
Blank	Excluded (EX)

**Bold** – Pole

Italics – Fastest Lap
