= 2024 D1 Grand Prix series =

2024 Gran Turismo D1 Grand Prix Series was the 24th season of D1 Grand Prix drifting competition. It started on May 10 at Okuibuki Motorpark and ended on November 10 at Odaiba. The series is run by Sunpros under Japanese Automobile Federation (JAF) official semi-national competition format. The competition was held as JAF Japan Drift Championship as drifting category is added to Japan Championship by JAF.

Hideyuki Fujino entered the season as defending champion in both Overall and Single run championship.

Naoki Nakamura won his second Overall and Solo Run championship at the final round of the season from Daigo Saito and Tetsuya Hibino. Shibata Racing Team wins the team championship for the first time.

== Schedule ==
Calendar released by Japan Automobile Federation
Round	Venue	Date
1	Okuibuki Motorpark, Shiga Prefecture	May 11
2	Okuibuki Motorpark, Shiga Prefecture	May 12
3	Tsukuba Circuit, Ibaraki Prefecture	June 29
4	Tsukuba Circuit, Ibaraki Prefecture	June 30
5	Ebisu Circuit, Fukushima Prefecture	September 28
6	Ebisu Circuit, Fukushima Prefecture	September 29
7	(Ōita Prefecture) Autopolis, Oita Prefecture	October 26
8	(Ōita Prefecture) Autopolis, Oita Prefecture	October 27
9	Odaiba, Tokyo Bay	November 9
10	Odaiba, Tokyo Bay	November 10

== Rule Changes ==
=== Tyre Allocation Rules ===
On 21 March, D1GP changes tyre allocation rules.

Under the new regulation, tyre allocation for each round is limited to :

- Two sets in Friday practice sessions. A third set used in practice (for failures, et al.) shall result a ten-point deduction will be applied to Solo Run score.
- Four sets for Saturday and Sunday competition, with an additional set to be used in the final round. The set used in the morning check-run must be used in the solo run.
- An extra set will be added for the Autopolis and Tsukuba rounds.

=== Scoring Regulation ===
For this season the tires of the car had to be inside the clipping point as opposed to only body parts in previous seasons. This is to prevent teams and drivers fitting overly extended parts on the car.

== Drivers and Teams ==
Team	Tires	Machine	No	Driver	Round
Team Toyo Tires Drift	Toyo Tires	Toyota GR86 (ZN8)	66	(Japan) Hideyuki Fujino	All
Team Toyo Tires Drift	Toyo Tires	Toyota GR86 (ZN8)	88	(Japan) Masato Kawabata	All
Team Toyo Tires Drift +Leno Racing	Toyo Tires	Toyota GR Corolla (E210)	77	(Japan) Hokuto Matsuyama	All
Valino x N-Style	Valino	Nissan Silvia (S13)	99	(Japan) Naoki Nakamura	All
Shibata Racing Seimi Style Drift	Shibatire	Nissan Silvia (S15)	2	(Japan) Seimi Tanaka	All
Shibata Racing Team	Shibatire	Toyota GR86 (ZN8)	31	(Japan) Koudai Sobagiri	All
Shibata Racing Team	Shibatire	Toyota GR86 (ZN8)	18	(Japan) Tetsuya Hibino	All
Team D-Max Racing	Toyo Tires	Nissan Silvia (S15)	70	(Japan) Masashi Yokoi	All
Team D-Max Racing	Toyo Tires	Nissan Silvia (S15)	80	(Japan) Yuki Tano	All
Drift Star Racing	Valino	Nissan Onevia (S13)	98	(Japan) Hiroki Vito	All
Drift Star Racing	Valino	Toyota Chaser (JZX100)	75	(Japan) Yumeto Hatanaka	All
Vazestra	Valino	Nissan Silvia (S15)	15	(Japan) Katsuhiro Ueo	1–2, 7–8
Repair Create × Result Japan	Shibatire	Toyota GR86 (ZN8)	23	(Japan) Mitsuru Murakami	All
TOP Team G-Meister	Valino	BMW 3-Series (E92)	79	(Japan) Kojiro Mekuwa	All
TOP Team G-Meister	Valino	BMW 3-Series (E92)	16	(Japan) Koji Yamaguchi	All
広島トヨタ team DROO-P	Dunlop	Toyota GR86 (ZN8)	33	(Japan) Junya Ishikawa	All
広島トヨタ team DROO-P	Dunlop	Toyota Sprinter (AE85)	55	(Japan) Kazuya Matsukawa	All
Racing Service Watanabe	Antares	Mazda RX-7 (FC3S)	51	(Japan) Teruyoshi Iwai	All
Racing Service Watanabe	Habilead	Toyota Sprinter (AE86)	43	(Japan) Yosifumi Tadokoro	All
Fat Five Racing	Shibatire	Toyota Supra (J29/DB)	87	(Japan) Daigo Saito	All
Fat Five Racing	Toyo Tires	Toyota GR86 (ZN8)	21	(Malaysia) Tengku Djan Ley	1–2
TEAM RE雨宮 マツモトキヨシ シバタイヤ	Shibatire	Mazda RX-7 (FD3S)	7	(Japan) Yukio Matsui	All
Team Vertex	Shibatire	Lexus RC (XC10)	78	(Japan) Takahiro Ueno	All
Team Vertex	Toyo Tires	Nissan Silvia (S15)	95	(Thailand) Daychapon Toyingcharoen (Pond)	1–4
Team Vertex	Toyo Tires	Toyota GR86 (ZN8)	95	(Thailand) Daychapon Toyingcharoen (Pond)	5–8
GP Sports × Greentop	Valino	Nissan 180SX (RPS13)	56	(Japan) Takahiro Mori	All
GP Sports × Greentop	Valino	Nissan 180SX (RPS13)	47	(Japan) Hisato Yonai	All
Nexzter Drive to Drift	Shibatire	Nissan 180SX (RPS13)	63	(Thailand) Konpicit Toyingcharoen (Pay)	1–8
Nexzter Drive to Drift	Shibatire	Toyota GR86 (ZN8)	89	(Thailand) Lattapon Keawchin (Pop)	1–4
Nexzter Drive to Drift	Shibatire	BMW 2-Series (F22)	89	(Thailand) Lattapon Keawchin (Pop)	5–10
俺だっ! レーシング×ウエインズトヨタ神奈川	Yokohama	Toyota Supra (J29/DB)	90	(Japan) Maopo Yamanaka	1–6
ハイチュウ インターナショナル	Shibatire	Nissan 180SX (RPS13)	11	(Japan) Sumika Kubokawa	1–6
平野タイヤ ★ ハードコア ★ ロケットバニーレーシング	Dunlop	Nissan Silvia (S15)	93	(Japan) Hirotaka Kanou	1–6
27WORKS	Shibatire	Nissan Silvia (S15)	27	(Japan) Takeshi Mogi	1–6
FORGED crew × 佐藤牧場	Shibatire	Nissan Silvia (S15)	9	(Japan) Wataru Yamamoto	3–6
Team Miyaseimitsu	Valino	Nissan Silvia (S15)	38	(Japan) Hisashi Saito	3–6
Team RDS	Shibatire	Nissan Skyline (ER34)	84	(Japan) Masakazu Hashi	1–6
Team Frontier Next	Valino	Toyota GR86 (ZN8)	86	(Japan) Shigehisa Sasayama	1–2, 5–6
URAS Racing	Dunlop	Nissan Skyline (R34)	3	(Japan) Keiichi Nomura	1–6
Team MJ Style Valino	Valino	Toyota GR86 (ZN8)	10	(Japan) Hayato Miyoshi	1–6
Toyo Tires × RedBull TCP Magic	Toyo Tires	Mazda RX-3 (S102W)	12	(New Zealand) "Mad" Mike Whiddett	1–2, 5–6
Team Sasarin	Valino	Toyota GT86 (ZN6)	24	(Japan) Atsushi Hirayama	3–6
トヨプラス Racing Team	Valino	Nissan Silvia (S15)	57	(Japan) Toshiyuki Jinno	1–6
Garasi Drift × GP Sports	Vitour	Toyota GT86 (ZN6)	29	(Indonesia) Ziko Harnadi	9–10

=== Changes ===
- Hokuto Matsuyama is set to join the main Toyo Tires team but due to limit on drivers per team, He will be entering under Team Toyo Tires Drift +Leno Racing. He will be debuting a Toyota GR Corolla replacing his previous GR Supra.
- Naoki Nakamura announced he will be reusing his V8 powered S13 Silvia he previously use in 2022 season.
- Koudai Sobagiri will compete in a Toyota GR86 replacing the Infiniti Q60 he's been using since his debut in the series.
- D-Max will be using Toyo Tires for this season. A third tire manufacturer in 3 season.
- Masao Suenaga announced his retirement from pro-drifting competition at 2024 Tokyo Auto Salon. He will be replaced by 2022 D1 Lights champion Yuki Tano.
- Fat Five Racing entered 2 car for the first time since 2021
  - Daigo Saito is planned to replace his GR Supra with a Mercedes SLS AMG but due to the SLS not ready on time, he will compete in Supra he previously use in 2019 for the first four round. However the SLS is not finished and he would return to his Supra from previous season for the rest of the season.
  - Tengku Djan Ley will make his D1GP debut joining Daigo Saito in Fat Five Racing and will be driving Toyota GR86. Djan Ley supposed to be entering in 2020 but unable to do so due to COVID-19 pandemic.
- Drift Star Racing entered 2 car for the first time as Yumeto Hatanaka join Hiroki Vito.
- RE Amemiya will use Shibatire and entered as "TEAM RE雨宮 マツモトキヨシ シバタイヤ". Ending a partnership with Toyo Tires.
- Two-time D1 Street Legal champion Yusuke Kitaoka is leaving Team Mori after 7 season together. He will be participate in D1 Lights instead.
- 2023 D1 Lights champion Hisato Yonai will stepping up to the series joining Takahiro Mori at GP Sports. He will participate in Nissan 180SX.
- 2021 Formula Drift Japan 2 champion Maopo Yamanaka will make his series debut for 俺だっ! レーシング×ウエインズトヨタ神奈川 (Read as Ore Da! Racing x Weins Toyota Kanagawa) replacing Genki Mogami. Evangelion Racing will no longer be team's sponsor.
- Sumika Kubokawa will be sponsored by fruit candy maker Hi-Chew and entering under ハイチュウ インターナショナル (Hi-Chew International).
- Ken Nomura's son, Keiichi Nomura is set to make his debut in the series, having successfully score enough points for GP license in previous D1 Lights season. He will continue to drive his R34 Skyline he use in D1 Lights with Dunlop as tire supplier. He will be the second son of a former driver to compete in D1GP after Yumeto Hatanaka make his debut in previous season.
- "Mad" Mike Whiddett is set to return to D1GP, having previously competed in Formula Drift Japan and will be driving a Mazda RX-3 Wagon powered by a 4 rotor.
- D1 Lights driver Toshiyuki Jinno planned to enter D1GP with his S15 Silvia he previously use in D1 Lights.
- Hayato Miyoshi stepped up to D1GP and will be driving a GR86 previously driven by Shigehisa Sasayama
- On Ebisu round, Pop debut a VR38 powered BMW 2-Series replacing his GR86 which in turn, would be driven by Pond.
- On Odaiba round, Wataru Yamamoto is back to using a SPAN Racing built V8 powered GR Supra he use in 2022.
- 2024 D1GP Southeast Asia champion and YouTuber Ziko Harnadi will compete in final 2 round driving a Toyota GT86. He will be the first Indonesian to compete in D1GP since Emmanuelle Amandio in 2014.

== Results and standings ==
=== Round results ===
Round	Venue	Winner		Report
Round	Venue	Solo Run	Battle	Report
1	Okuibuki Motorpark	Naoki Nakamura	Naoki Nakamura	
2	Okuibuki Motorpark	Hokuto Matsuyama	Tetsuya Hibino	
3	Tsukuba Circuit	Naoki Nakamura	Daigo Saito	
4	Tsukuba Circuit	Tetsuya Hibino	Daigo Saito	
5	Ebisu	Naoki Nakamura	Koudai Sobagiri	
6	Ebisu	Koudai Sobagiri	Koudai Sobagiri	
7	Autopolis	Takahiro Ueno	Tetsuya Hibino	
8	Autopolis	Koudai Sobagiri	Daigo Saito	
9	Odaiba	Masato Kawabata	Maopo Yamanaka	
10	Odaiba	Naoki Nakamura	Masato Kawabata	

Further Information : 2024 D1 Grand Prix Series Ranking

=== Points System ===
Overall Standings
Positions	1st	2nd	3rd	4th	5th	6th	7th	8th	9th	10th	11th	12th	13th	14th	15th	16th
Drivers Point	25	21	18	16	13	12	11	10	8	7	6	5	4	3	2	1
Team Point	26	20	15	10	6	6	6	6	3	3	3	3	3	3	3	3
Tanso Points	4	3	2	1												
Tanso Standings
Point	20	16	15	14	13	12	11	10	8	7	6	5	4	3	2	1

=== Overall Standings ===
Rank	Driver	Okuibuki		Tsukuba		Ebisu		Autopolis		Odaiba		Total
Rank	Driver	RD.1	RD.2	RD.3	RD.4	RD.5	RD.6	RD.7	RD.8	RD.9	RD.10	Total
1	Naoki Nakamura	29	6	22	16	22	24	0	19	0	17	155
2	Daigo Saito	21	22	25	28	11	0	0	25	21	0	152
3	Tetsuya Hibino	16	25	10	25	14	18	25		4	13	150
4	Koudai Sobagiri	4	15	0	3	28	29	15	12	11	7	124
5	Masashi Yokoi	18	13	12	14	0	5	0	11	19	16	108
6	Masato Kawabata	0	5	0	18	0	4	12	21	17	25	102
7	Hideyuki Fujino	0	11	5	7	12	10	18	8	16	10	97
8	Hokuto Matsuyama	12	12	0	5	21	13	16	1	10	6	96
9	Mao Yamanaka	5	1	0	4	3	16	0	16	27	22	94
10	Mitsuru Murakami	11	16	14	0	6	15	0	10	0	0	72
11	Seimi Tanaka	2	0	16	12	0	11	21	3	0	3	68
12	Yuki Tano	0	21	16	6	10	0	2	5	0	2	62
13	Takahiro Mori	10	0	7	0	10	8	0	13	6	0	54
14	Takahiro Ueno	11	0	21	0	0	7	12	0	0	0	51
15	Junya Ishikawa	0	3	0	0	5	0	10	2	15	15	50
16	Hiroki Vito	0	4	0	11	16	0	0	10	8	0	49
17	Kojiro Mekuwa	13	0	3	0	0	0	10	0	0	8	34
18	Hisato Yonai	0	0	0	10	7	6	4	4	1	0	32
19	Hayato Miyoshi	0	10	0	0	0	0	0	0	0	18	28
20	Yukio Matsui	7	7	0	0	0	0	0	0	2	4	20
21	Teruyoshi Iwai	0	0	4	0	4	3	3	0	5	0	19
22	Takeshi Mogi	0	0	8	1	0	0	7	0	0	0	16
23	Hirotaka Kano	9	0	6	0	1	0	0	0	0	0	16
24	Koji Yamaguchi	0	0	0	0	0	0	0	12	0	0	12
25	Kazuya Matsukawa	0	0	0	0	0	0	11	0	0	0	11
26	Lattapon Keawchin (Pop)	0	2	0	0	0	0	0	0	3	5	10
27	Wataru Yamamoto	0	0	0	0	0	0	0	0	7	0	7
28	Katsuhiro Ueo	0	0	0	0	0	0	5	0	0	0	5
29	Yoshifumi Tadokoro	0	0	1	2	0	0	1	0	0	0	4
30	Yumeto Hatanaka	3	0	0	0	0	0	0	0	0	0	3
31	Tetsuro Nakata	0	0	0	0	0	2	0	0	0	0	2
32	Sumika Kubokawa	0	0	0	0	2	0	0	0	0	0	2
33	Akinori Utsumi	0	0	2	0	0	0	0	0	0	0	2
34	Toshiyuki Jinno	0	0	0	0	0	0	0	0	0	1	1
35	Shigehisa Sasayama	0	0	0	0	0	1	0	0	0	0	1
36	Daychapon Toyingcharoen (Pond)	1	0	0	0	0	0	0	0	0	0	1

=== Solo Run Standings ===
Rank.	Driver	RD.1	RD.2	RD.3	RD.4	RD.5	RD.6	RD.7	RD.8	RD.9	RD.10	Total
1	Naoki Nakamura	20	7	20	3	20	16		14		20	120
2	Koudai Sobagiri	8	15		4	16	20	15	20	13	8	119
3	Hideyuki Fujino		11	6	13	11	8	12	15	11	13	100
4	Tetsuya Hibino	4	13	8	20	14	13	8		4	15	99
5	Hokuto Matsuyama	10	20		11	5	14	4	4	12	6	86
6	Mitsuru Murakami	16	10	15		12	15		16			84
7	Masashi Yokoi	12	14	14	14		5		3	14	7	83
8	Yuki Tanno		16	16	12	15		6	13		2	80
9	Mao Yamanaka	13	2		8	4	6		12	15	14	74
10	Junya Ishikawa		4			8		16	6	16	16	66
11	Daigo Saito	2	12	5	16	10			7	10		62
12	Hisato Yonai				15	13	7	11	11	1		58
13	Masato Kawabata		6		5		4	7	1	20	12	55
14	Seimi Tanaka	6		12	10		11	2	8		3	52
15	Takahiro Ueno	5		11			10	20				46
16	Takahiro Mori	3		10		3	12		10	6		44
17	Teruyoshi Iwai			4		7	3	10		5		29
18	Yukio Matsui	14	8							2	4	28
19	Hiroki Vito		5		7	6			2	8		28
20	Takeshi Mogi			13	1			14				28
21	Kojiro Mekuwa	11		3	0			1			11	26
22	Hirotaka Kano	15		7		1						23
23	Katsuhiro Ueo							13				13
24	Hayato Miyoshi		1								10	11
25	Lattapon Keawchin (Pop)		3							3	5	11
26	Wataru Yamamoto									7		7
27	Yumeto Hatanaka	7										7
28	Yoshifumi Tadokoro			1	2			3				6
29	Koji Yamaguchi								5			5
30	Kazuya Matsukawa							5				5
31	Tetsuro Nakata						2					2
32	Sumika Kubokawa					2						2
33	Akinori Utsumi			2								2
34	Toshiyuki Jinno										1	1
35	Shigehisa Sasayama						1					1
36	Daychapon Toyingcharoen (Pond)	1										1

=== Team's Standings ===
Rank.	Team	RD.1	RD.2	RD.3	RD.4	RD.5	RD.6	RD.7	RD.8	RD.9	RD.10	Total
1	SHIBATA RACING TEAM	10	26	6	20	26	26	26	3	6	6	155
2	FAT FIVE RACING	20	20	26	26	6			26	20		144
3	TEAM VALINO × N-STYLE	26	3	15	10	15	20		15		6	110
4	TEAM TOYO TIRES DRIFT		6	3	15	6	6	15	20	10	26	107
5	TEAM D-MAX RACING	15	15	6	6	3	3	3	6	15	10	82
6	ウエインズトヨタ神奈川 × 俺だっ！レーシング	3	3		3	3	10		10	26	20	78
7	TEAM TOYO TIRES DRIFT 2	6	3		3	20	6	10	3	6	3	60
8	SEIMI STYLE SHIBATIRE DRIFT	3		10	6		6	20	3		3	51
9	GP SPORTS × GreenTop	6		3	3	6	3	3	6	3		33
10	TEAM VERTEX NEXZTER D2D	6		20			3	3				32
11	DRIFT STAR Racing	3	3		6	10			6	3		31
12	Repair Create × Result Japan	3	10	6		3	6		3			31
13	広島トヨタ team DROO-P		3			3		6	3	6	6	27
14	TOP Team G-meister	6		3	0			6	6		3	24
15	Team MJ-STYLE VALINO		6								15	21
16	レーシングサービス ワタナベ			3	3	3	3	3		3		18
17	TEAM RE雨宮 マツモトキヨシ シバタイヤ	3	3							3	3	12
18	NEXZTER DRIVE TO DRIFT		3							3	3	9
19	27WORKS			3	3			3				9
20	平野タイヤ ★ ハードコア ★ ロケットバニーレーシング	3		3		3						9
21	トヨプラス Racing Team										3	3
22	FORGED crew × 佐藤牧場									3		3
23	VAZESTRA							3				3
24	TEAM TNR LOVCA						3					3
25	Team FRONTIER NEXT						3					3
26	HI-CHEW International					3						3
27	BLUE FACE			3								3
