= 2024 Formula Car Challenge =

2024 formula racing championship

The 2024 Formula Car Challenge presented by Goodyear was the 20th season of the Formula Car Challenge. It was a multi-event motor racing championship for single-seater open wheel formula racing cars held across the American west coast. The series was sanctioned by the Sports Car Club of America.

Christian Okpysh defended his Drivers' Championship title, clinching it at the penultimate race of the season.

== Drivers ==
No.	Driver	Car	Rounds
4	(United States) Melvin Kemper Jr.	Star Formula Mazda	5
7	(United States) Rodney A. Simmons	Mazda Formula Mazda	2, 7
8	(France) Timothy Carel	2024 Tatuus AP T-021	8
9	(United States) Ritchie Hollingsworth	1995 Mazda Formula Mazda	7
11	(United States) Ken Boatright	Formula Mazda	6–7
12	(Canada) Marcus Brodie	1997 Mazda Formula Mazda	1, 3
17	(United States) John Ertel	1994 Mazda Formula Star	3
19	(United States) Brian Anderson	Formula Mazda	5
22	(United States) Michael Morgan	Mazda Formula Mazda	5
25	(United States) Bret Imhoff	Mazda Formula Mazda	3
28	(United States) Stew Tabak	1993 Mazda Formula	2–8
29	(United States) Christian Okpysh	1997 Mazda Formula Mazda	1–6, 8
63	(Denmark) Lars Jensen	1997 Star Formula Mazda	1–4, 7–8
67	(United States) Bill Weaver	1997 Star Mazda Formula Mazda	1, 3–5, 7–8
72	(United States) Taylor Carmona	Formula Mazda	2–3, 8
73	(United States) Gokul Manean	Formula Mazda	8
74	(United States) Steve Martin	2003 Formula Mazda	8
75	(United States) C.J. Ray	1998 Mazda Star Formula	1, 3, 6, 8
77	(United States) Derry O'Donovan	1996 Formula Mazda FM	3–4
78	(United States) Brad Drew	1997 Mazda Formula	1–6, 8
83	(United States) Cameron Parsons	2012 Fast Forward Formula	8
92	(United States) Rick Bostrom	1988 Mazda Formula	5

== Race calendar ==
The 2024 schedule was announced on 2 December 2023. The season was to open with a one-round winter series at the Attesa Podium Club, but that event attracted no entries in the FCC's class. The eight-round main season saw the return of Portland International Raceway.

Round		Circuit	Date	Support bill	Map of circuit locations
FCC Winter Series					2024 Formula Car Challenge is located in USA West
NC	R1	(United States) ~~Podium Club Attesa, Casa Grande~~	~~2–3 March~~	SCCA Majors Championship; Saguaro Series	2024 Formula Car Challenge is located in USA West
NC	R2	(United States) ~~Podium Club Attesa, Casa Grande~~	~~2–3 March~~	SCCA Majors Championship; Saguaro Series	2024 Formula Car Challenge is located in USA West
Formula Car Challenge					2024 Formula Car Challenge is located in USA West
1	R1	(United States) Thunderhill Raceway Park, Willows	23 March	San Francisco Region SCCA Series; Formula Pro USA Western Championship	2024 Formula Car Challenge is located in USA West
1	R2	(United States) Thunderhill Raceway Park, Willows	24 March	San Francisco Region SCCA Series; Formula Pro USA Western Championship	2024 Formula Car Challenge is located in USA West
2	R3	(United States) Thunderhill Raceway Park, Willows	20 April	SCCA Majors Championship; Formula Pro USA Western Championship	2024 Formula Car Challenge is located in USA West
2	R4	(United States) Thunderhill Raceway Park, Willows	21 April	SCCA Majors Championship; Formula Pro USA Western Championship	2024 Formula Car Challenge is located in USA West
3	R5	(United States) WeatherTech Raceway Laguna Seca, Monterey	8 June	San Francisco Region SCCA Series; Formula Pro USA Western Championship	2024 Formula Car Challenge is located in USA West
3	R6	(United States) WeatherTech Raceway Laguna Seca, Monterey	9 June	San Francisco Region SCCA Series; Formula Pro USA Western Championship	2024 Formula Car Challenge is located in USA West
4	R7	(United States) WeatherTech Raceway Laguna Seca, Monterey	6 July	San Francisco Region SCCA Series; Formula Pro USA Western Championship	2024 Formula Car Challenge is located in USA West
4	R8	(United States) WeatherTech Raceway Laguna Seca, Monterey	7 July	San Francisco Region SCCA Series; Formula Pro USA Western Championship	2024 Formula Car Challenge is located in USA West
5	R9	(United States) Portland International Raceway, Portland	10 August	Cascade Sports Car Club Series; International Conference of Sports Car Clubs Championship	2024 Formula Car Challenge is located in USA West
5	R10	(United States) Portland International Raceway, Portland	11 August	Cascade Sports Car Club Series; International Conference of Sports Car Clubs Championship	2024 Formula Car Challenge is located in USA West
6	R11	(United States) Sonoma Raceway, Sonoma	31 August	San Francisco Region SCCA Series; Formula Pro USA Western Championship	2024 Formula Car Challenge is located in USA West
6	R12	(United States) Sonoma Raceway, Sonoma	1 September	San Francisco Region SCCA Series; Formula Pro USA Western Championship	2024 Formula Car Challenge is located in USA West
7	R13	(United States) Thunderhill Raceway Park, Willows	25 October	San Francisco Region SCCA Series	2024 Formula Car Challenge is located in USA West
7	R14	(United States) Thunderhill Raceway Park, Willows	26 October	San Francisco Region SCCA Series	2024 Formula Car Challenge is located in USA West
8	R15	(United States) Buttonwillow Raceway Park, Buttonwillow	16 November	California Sports Car Club; Formula Pro USA Western Championship	2024 Formula Car Challenge is located in USA West
8	R16	(United States) Buttonwillow Raceway Park, Buttonwillow	17 November	California Sports Car Club; Formula Pro USA Western Championship	2024 Formula Car Challenge is located in USA West

== Race results ==
Round		Circuit	Pole position	Fastest lap	Winning driver
1	R1	(United States) Thunderhill Raceway Park	(United States) Bill Weaver	(United States) Bill Weaver	(United States) Bill Weaver
1	R2	(United States) Thunderhill Raceway Park	(United States) Bill Weaver	(United States) Bill Weaver	(United States) Bill Weaver
2	R3	(United States) Thunderhill Raceway Park	(United States) Stew Tabak	(United States) Christian Okpysh	(United States) Christian Okpysh
2	R4	(United States) Thunderhill Raceway Park	(United States) Christian Okpysh	(United States) Christian Okpysh	(United States) Christian Okpysh
3	R5	(United States) WeatherTech Raceway Laguna Seca	(United States) Christian Okpysh	(United States) Christian Okpysh	(United States) Christian Okpysh
3	R6	(United States) WeatherTech Raceway Laguna Seca	(United States) Christian Okpysh	(United States) Christian Okpysh	(United States) Christian Okpysh
4	R7	(United States) WeatherTech Raceway Laguna Seca	(United States) Christian Okpysh	(United States) Christian Okpysh	(United States) Christian Okpysh
4	R8	(United States) WeatherTech Raceway Laguna Seca	(United States) Christian Okpysh	(United States) Christian Okpysh	(United States) Christian Okpysh
5	R9	(United States) Portland International Raceway	(United States) Christian Okpysh	(United States) Christian Okpysh	(United States) Christian Okpysh
5	R10	(United States) Portland International Raceway	(United States) Christian Okpysh	(United States) Christian Okpysh	(United States) Christian Okpysh
6	R11	(United States) Sonoma Raceway	(United States) Christian Okpysh	(United States) Christian Okpysh	(United States) Christian Okpysh
6	R12	(United States) Sonoma Raceway	(United States) Christian Okpysh	(United States) Christian Okpysh	(United States) Christian Okpysh
7	R13	(United States) Thunderhill Raceway Park	(United States) Bill Weaver	(Denmark) Lars Jensen	(United States) Bill Weaver
7	R14	(United States) Thunderhill Raceway Park	(United States) Bill Weaver	(United States) Stew Tabak	(United States) Bill Weaver
8	R15	(United States) Buttonwillow Raceway Park	(France) Timothy Carel	(France) Timothy Carel	(France) Timothy Carel
8	R16	(United States) Buttonwillow Raceway Park	(United States) Christian Okpysh	(France) Timothy Carel	(France) Timothy Carel

== Championship standings ==
=== Scoring system ===
Points were awarded to the top twenty drivers taking the green flag.

Position	**1st**	**2nd**	**3rd**	**4th**	**5th**	**6th**	**7th**	**8th**	**9th**	**10th**	**11th**	**12th**	**13th**	**14th**	**15th**	**16th**	**17th**	**18th**	**19th**	**20th**
Points	29	25	22	20	19	18	17	16	15	14	13	12	11	10	9	8	7	6	5	4

Each driver's three worst results were dropped.

=== Drivers' standings ===
Pos	Driver	THU1		THU2		LAG1		LAG2		POR		SON		THU3		BUT		Pts
Pos	Driver	R1	R2	R3	R4	R5	R6	R7	R8	R9	R10	R11	R12	R13	R14	R15	R16	Pts
1	(United States) Christian Okpysh	6	DNS	1	**1**	**1**	**1**	**1**	**1**	**1**	**1**	**1**	**1**			2	**2**	366
2	(United States) Brad Drew	2	4	2	2	2	(9)	3	2	2	2	5	2			10	7	304
3	(United States) Bill Weaver	**1**	**1**			3	2	2	DNS	3	4			**1**	**1**	3	4	277
4	(United States) Stew Tabak			**4**	3	9	DNS	4	3	8	3	3	4	2	2	6	6	271
5	(Denmark) Lars Jensen	5	5	3	4	DNS	6	5	4					3	3	8	9	214
6	(United States) C.J. Ray	3	3			4	3					2	3			4	5	175
7	(United States) Taylor Carmona			5	5	8	4									9	10	105
8	(United States) Rodney A. Simmons			6	6									4	4			76
9	(United States) Ken Boatright											4	5	6	6			75
10	(United States) Derry O'Donovan					5	5	6	5									74
11	(Canada) Marcus Brodie	4	2			DNS	DNS											45
12	(United States) Cameron Parsons															5	3	45
13	(United States) Ritchie Hollingsworth													5	5			38
14	(United States) Bret Imhoff					6	7											35
15	(United States) Gokul Manean															7	8	35
16	(United States) John Ertel					7	8											33
17	(United States) Steve Martin															11	11	28
Drivers ineligible to score points as they did not meet all FCC rules
—	(France) Timothy Carel															**1**	1	—
—	(United States) Melvin Kemper Jr.									4	5							—
—	(United States) Brian Anderson									5	6							—
—	(United States) Rick Bostrom									6	7							—
—	(United States) Michael Morgan									7	8							—
Pos	Driver	R1	R2	R3	R4	R5	R6	R7	R8	R9	R10	R11	R12	R13	R14	R15	R16	Pts
Pos	Driver	THU1		THU2		LAG1		LAG2		POR		SON		THU3		BUT		Pts

Colour	Result
Gold	Winner
Silver	Second place
Bronze	Third place
Green	Points classification
Blue	Non-points classification
Blue	Non-classified finish (NC)
Purple	Retired, not classified (Ret)
Red	Did not qualify (DNQ)
Red	Did not pre-qualify (DNPQ)
Black	Disqualified (DSQ)
White	Did not start (DNS)
White	Withdrew (WD)
White	Race cancelled (C)
Blank	Did not practice (DNP)
Blank	Did not arrive (DNA)
Blank	Excluded (EX)

**Bold** – Pole

Italics – Fastest Lap
