= 2026 TC America Series =

Touring car racing season

The 2026 TC America Series Powered by Skip Barber Racing School was the eighth season of the TC America Series. The season began at Sonoma on March 27, and finished at Indianapolis on October 11.

== Calendar ==
The finalized calendar was released on September 19, 2025, featuring 14 races across seven rounds.

Round	Circuit	Date	Map
1	Sonoma Raceway, Sonoma, California	March 27–29	2026 TC America Series is located in the United States
2	Circuit of the Americas, Austin, Texas	April 24–26	2026 TC America Series is located in the United States
3	Sebring International Raceway, Sebring, Florida	May 8–10	2026 TC America Series is located in the United States
4	(Georgia (U.S. state)) Road Atlanta, Braselton, Georgia	June 12–14	2026 TC America Series is located in the United States
5	Road America, Elkhart Lake, Wisconsin	August 28–30	2026 TC America Series is located in the United States
6	Barber Motorsports Park, Birmingham, Alabama	September 25–27	2026 TC America Series is located in the United States
7	Indianapolis Motor Speedway, Indianapolis, Indiana	October 8–11	2026 TC America Series is located in the United States

== Entry list ==
Team	Car	No.	Drivers	Rounds
(Canada) JMF Motorsports	Toyota GR Corolla TC	2	(United States) James Klimas	4–5
(Canada) JMF Motorsports	Toyota GR Corolla TC	3	(United States) Jesse Dorkin	1–4
(Canada) JMF Motorsports	Toyota GR Corolla TC	3	(United States) Michai Stephens	5
(Canada) JMF Motorsports	Toyota GR Corolla TC	4	(Canada) Braydon Arthur	1–5
(United States) Skip Barber Racing	Acura Integra Type-S DE5	7	(United States) Dean Lambros	1–5
(United States) Skip Barber Racing	Acura Integra Type-S DE5	25	(United States) Logan Anderson	1–5
(United States) Ricca Autosport	Hyundai Elantra N1 TC Evo	8	(United States) Justin Gravett	1–5
(United States) Ricca Autosport	Hyundai Elantra N1 TC Evo	33	(Canada) Eric Kunz	1–5
(United States) Ricca Autosport	Hyundai Elantra N1 TC Evo	76	(Canada) PJ Groenke	2–4
(United States) Ricca Autosport	Hyundai Elantra N1 TC Evo	76	(Mexico) Ricardo Cordero Muniz	5
(United States) Ricca Autosport	Hyundai Elantra N1 TC Evo	77	(United States) Andre Castro	1–5
(United States) Ricca Autosport	Hyundai Elantra N1 TC Evo	78	(United States) Matan Rosenberg	1, 5
(United States) Ricca Autosport	Hyundai Elantra N1 TC Evo	78	(Puerto Rico) CJ Sepulveda	2–3
(United States) Ricca Autosport	Hyundai Elantra N1 TC Evo	78	(United States) Jeff Ricca	4
(Canada) Fawn Group Motorsports by Ricca Autosport	Hyundai Elantra N1 TC Evo	18	(Canada) Shelby Mills	1–2, 4–5
(Canada) Fawn Group Motorsports by Ricca Autosport	Hyundai Elantra N1 TC	18	(Canada) Shelby Mills	3
(United States) DRS	BMW M2 Racing (G87)	53	(United States) Robert Bellevue	1–5
(United States) FTG Racing	Mazda 3 TC	71	TBA	TBC
(United States) Precision Racing LA	Acura Integra Type-S DE5	73	(United States) Mike Lamarra	1–4

== Race results ==
Round		Circuit	Pole position	Race winners	Results
1	R1	(California) Sonoma	(Canada) #4 JMF Motorsports	(Canada) #4 JMF Motorsports	Report
1	R1	(California) Sonoma	(Canada) Braydon Arthur	(Canada) Braydon Arthur	Report
1	R2	(California) Sonoma	(United States) #77 Ricca Autosport	(United States) #77 Ricca Autosport	Report
1	R2	(California) Sonoma	(United States) Andre Castro	(United States) Andre Castro	Report
2	R1	(Texas) Austin	(Canada) #4 JMF Motorsports	(Canada) #4 JMF Motorsports	Report
2	R1	(Texas) Austin	(Canada) Braydon Arthur	(Canada) Braydon Arthur	Report
2	R2	(Texas) Austin	(United States) #77 Ricca Autosport	(Canada) #4 JMF Motorsports	Report
2	R2	(Texas) Austin	(United States) Andre Castro	(Canada) Braydon Arthur	Report
3	R1	(Florida) Sebring	(United States) #77 Ricca Autosport	(United States) #77 Ricca Autosport	Report
3	R1	(Florida) Sebring	(United States) Andre Castro	(United States) Andre Castro	Report
3	R2	(Florida) Sebring	(United States) #77 Ricca Autosport	(United States) #77 Ricca Autosport	Report
3	R2	(Florida) Sebring	(United States) Andre Castro	(United States) Andre Castro	Report
4	R1	(Georgia (U.S. state)) Road Atlanta	(Canada) #4 JMF Motorsports	(Canada) #4 JMF Motorsports	Report
4	R1	(Georgia (U.S. state)) Road Atlanta	(Canada) Braydon Arthur	(Canada) Braydon Arthur	Report
4	R2	(Georgia (U.S. state)) Road Atlanta	(Canada) #4 JMF Motorsports	(Canada) #4 JMF Motorsports	Report
4	R2	(Georgia (U.S. state)) Road Atlanta	(Canada) Braydon Arthur	(Canada) Braydon Arthur	Report
5	R1	(Wisconsin) Road America	(Canada) #4 JMF Motorsports	(Canada) #4 JMF Motorsports	Report
5	R1	(Wisconsin) Road America	(Canada) Braydon Arthur	(Canada) Braydon Arthur	Report
5	R2	(Wisconsin) Road America	(Canada) #4 JMF Motorsports	(Canada) #4 JMF Motorsports	Report
5	R2	(Wisconsin) Road America	(Canada) Braydon Arthur	(Canada) Braydon Arthur	Report
6	R1	(Alabama) Barber	(United States) #77 Ricca Autosport	(United States) #78 Ricca Autosport	Report
6	R1	(Alabama) Barber	(United States) Andre Castro	(United States) Matan Rosenberg	Report
6	R2	(Alabama) Barber	(United States) #77 Ricca Autosport	(United States) #77 Ricca Autosport	Report
6	R2	(Alabama) Barber	(United States) Andre Castro	(United States) Andre Castro	Report
7	R1	(Indiana) Indianapolis	(United States) #77 Ricca Autosport	(Canada) #4 JMF Motorsports	Report
7	R1	(Indiana) Indianapolis	(United States) Andre Castro	(Canada) Braydon Arthur	Report
7	R2	(Indiana) Indianapolis	(United States) #7 Skip Barber Racing	(Canada) #4 JMF Motorsports	Report
7	R2	(Indiana) Indianapolis	(United States) Dean Lambros	(Canada) Braydon Arthur	Report

== Championship standings ==
Scoring system

Championship points are awarded for the first ten positions in each race. Entries are required to complete 75% of the winning car's race distance in order to be classified and earn points.

Position	**1st**	**2nd**	**3rd**	**4th**	**5th**	**6th**	**7th**	**8th**	**9th**	**10th**
Points	25	18	15	12	10	8	6	4	2	1

=== Driver's championship ===
Pos.	Driver	Team	SON (California)		AUS (Texas)		SEB (Florida)		ATL (Georgia (U.S. state))		ELK (Wisconsin)		BAR (Alabama)		IMS (Indiana)		Points
Pos.	Driver	Team	RD1	RD2	RD1	RD2	RD1	RD2	RD1	RD2	RD1	RD2	RD1	RD2	RD1	RD2	Points
1	(Canada) Braydon Arthur	(Canada) JMF Motorsports	**1**	2	**1**	1	12	12	**1**	**1**	**1**	**1**					193
2	(United States) Andre Castro	(United States) Ricca Autosport	2	**1**	3	**3**	**1**	**1**	2	4	3	2					186
3	(United States) Justin Gravett	(United States) Ricca Autosport	3	5	4	5	2	2	3	3	2	3					146
4	(United States) Dean Lambros	(United States) Skip Barber Racing	6	3	2	2	4	5	5	2							109
5	(Canada) Eric Kunz	(United States) Ricca Autosport	4	4	6	6	3	3	12	DNS	10	10					72
6	(United States) Logan Anderson	(United States) Skip Barber Racing	9	10	7	4	7	7	6	11	8	4					57
7	(Canada) Shelby Mills	(Canada) Fawn Group Motorsports by Ricca Autosport	8	8	8	9	6	6	8	10	5	5					55
8	(United States) Mike Lamarra	(United States) Precision Racing LA	7	6	5	7	11	9	13	DNS							32
9	(Puerto Rico) CJ Sepulveda	(United States) Ricca Autosport			9	8	5	4									28
10	(United States) Jeff Ricca	(United States) Ricca Autosport							4	5							22
11	(United States) Matan Rosenberg	(United States) Ricca Autosport	5	7							9	8					22
12	(United States) Jesse Dorkin	(Canada) JMF Motorsports	10	9	DNS	11	9	8	7	8							19
13	(United States) Robert Bellevue	(United States) DRS	11	11	10	12	10	11	11	9	6	7					18
14	(United States) Michai Stephens	(Canada) JMF Motorsports									4	9					14
15	(Mexico) Ricardo Cordero Muniz	(United States) Ricca Autosport									7	6					14
16	(Canada) PJ Groenke	(United States) Ricca Autosport			11	10	8	10	10	7							13
17	(United States) James Klimas	(Canada) JMF Motorsports							9	6							10
Pos.	Driver	Team	SON (California)		AUS (Texas)		SEB (Florida)		ATL (Georgia (U.S. state))		ELK (Wisconsin)		BAR (Alabama)		IMS (Indiana)		Points

Key
Colour	Result
Gold	Race winner
Silver	2nd place
Bronze	3rd place
Green	Points finish
Blue	Non-points finish
Blue	Non-classified finish (NC)
Purple	Did not finish (Ret)
Black	Disqualified (DSQ)
Black	Excluded (EX)
White	Did not start (DNS)
White	Race cancelled (C)
White	Withdrew (WD)
Blank	Did not participate

**Bold** – Pole
Italics – Fastest Lap

=== Team's championship ===
Pos.	Teams	SON (California)		AUS (Texas)		SEB (Florida)		ATL (Georgia (U.S. state))		ELK (Wisconsin)		BAR (Alabama)		IMS (Indiana)		Points
Pos.	Teams	RD1	RD2	RD1	RD2	RD1	RD2	RD1	RD2	RD1	RD2	RD1	RD2	RD1	RD2	Points
1	(Canada) JMF Motorsports	1	2	1	1	4	4	1	1	1	1					217
2	(United States) Ricca Autosport	2	1	3	3	1	1	2	3	2	2					192
3	(United States) Skip Barber Racing	3	3	2	2	2	2	3	2	5	3					160
4	(Canada) Fawn Group Motorsports by Ricca Autosport	5	5	5	5	3	3	4	5	3	4					119
5	(United States) DRS	6	6	6	6	5	6	5	4	4	5					94
6	(United States) Precision Racing LA	4	4	4	4	6	5	6	DNS							74

=== Manufacturer's championship ===
Pos.	Manufacturer	SON (California)		AUS (Texas)		SEB (Florida)		ATL (Georgia (U.S. state))		ELK (Wisconsin)		BAR (Alabama)		IMS (Indiana)		Points
Pos.	Manufacturer	RD1	RD2	RD1	RD2	RD1	RD2	RD1	RD2	RD1	RD2	RD1	RD2	RD1	RD2	Points
1	(Japan) Toyota Gazoo Racing	1	2	1	1	3	3	1	1	1	1					223
2	(South Korea) Hyundai	2	1	3	3	1	1	2	3	2	2					192
3	(Japan) Acura	3	3	2	2	2	2	3	2	4	3					162
4	(Germany) BMW	4	4	4	4	4	4	4	4	3	4					123

=== Hyundai Cup ===
Drivers competing in the Hyundai Elantra N1 TC Evo are eligible for the Hyundai Cup. Scoring uses the same points system as the other championships. Other entries are made invisible.

Pos.	Drivers	AUS (Texas)		ATL (Georgia (U.S. state))		ELK (Wisconsin)		BAR (Alabama)		IMS (Indiana)		Points
Pos.	Drivers	RD1	RD2	RD1	RD2	RD1	RD2	RD1	RD2	RD1	RD2	Points
1	(United States) Andre Castro	1	1	1	2	2	1					136
2	(United States) Justin Gravett	2	2	2	1	1	2					122
3	(Canada) Shelby Mills	4	5	4	5	3	3					74
4	(Canada) Eric Kunz	3	3	6	DNS	6	6					54
5	(Canada) PJ Groenke	6	6	5	4							38
6	(United States) Jeff Ricca			3	3							30
7	(Mexico) Ricardo Cordero Muniz					4	4					24
8	(Puerto Rico) CJ Sepulveda	5	4									22
9	(United States) Matan Rosenberg					5	5					20

== See also ==
- 2026 TC France Series
