= Braydon Arthur =

Canadian racing driver (born 2003)

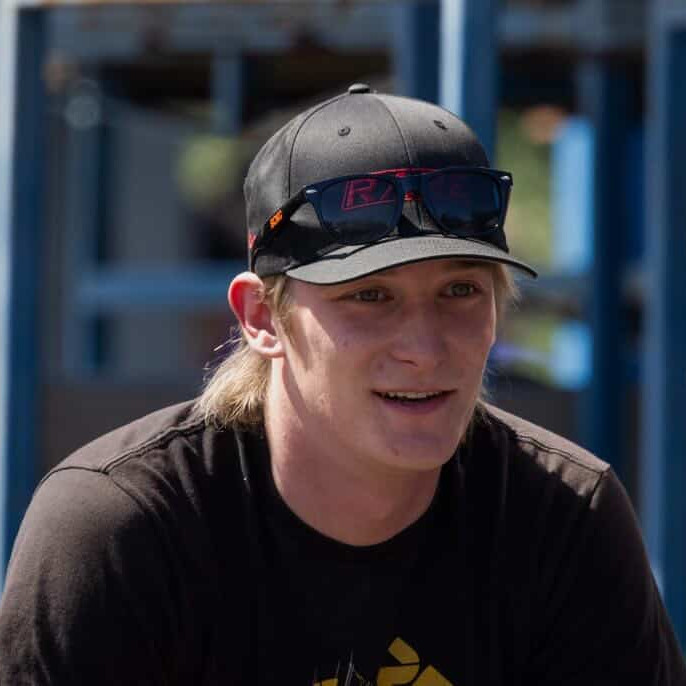
- Arthur at Greg Moore Raceway in 2026
- Nationality: Canada
- Born: May 16, 2003 (age 23) Mission, British Columbia, Canada

TC America Series career
- Current team: JMF Motorsports
- Car number: 4
- Starts: 14
- Wins: 9
- Podiums: 10
- Poles: 7

Championship titles
- 2026: TC America Series
- Statistics up to date as of October 11, 2026.

Braydon Arthur (born May 16, 2003) is a Canadian racing driver who last competed in the TC America Series, driving the No. 4 Toyota GR Corolla TC for JMF Motorsports. He is the 2026 TC America Series champion.

== Racing career ==
A third generation racer, Arthur began racing Formula Vee racecars at Mission Raceway Park in his hometown of Mission, British Columbia, alongside his brother Robbie. The brothers continue to participate in kart racing events across the Pacific Northwest.

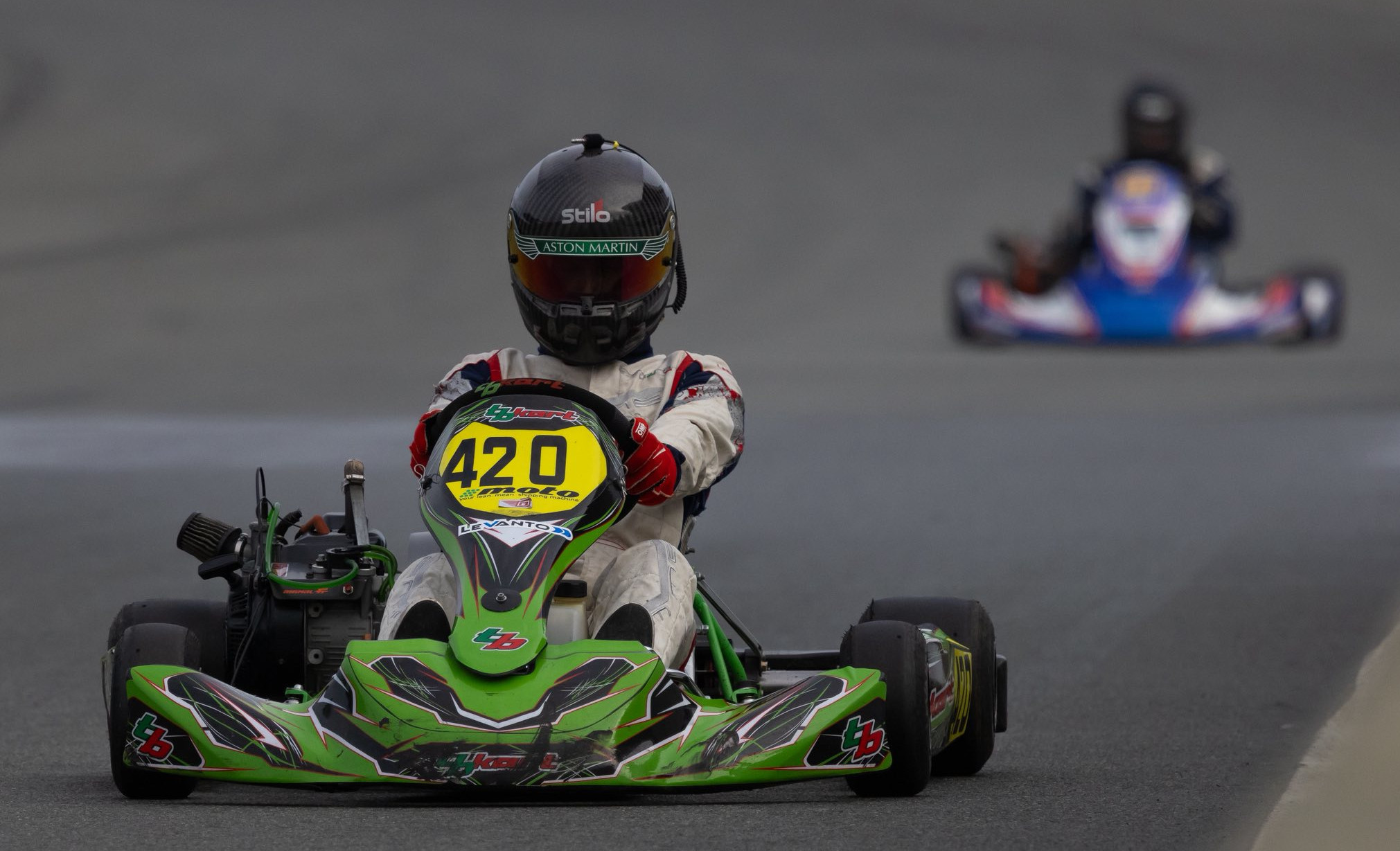
Arthur kart racing at the 2025 VIKA Enduro in Duncan, British Columbia

Arthur received an opportunity to race F4 cars in 2023 with Doran Motorsports, one of two drivers fielded by the team in the Formula Pro USA Winter Series. Given the limited competition, seat time and driver development were primary focuses in the entry.

In 2024, Arthur joined JMF Motorsports, an emergent team developed to promote young Canadian racing talent and give them opportunities for career advancement. Arthur would drive the No. 34 in the Toyota GR Cup North America. It was a difficult season for Arthur, taking six rounds to crack the points. In Round 8, the second race at Virginia International Raceway, Arthur endured a vicious rollover crash which closed the JMF No. 34 entry for the remainder of the season.

For 2025, Arthur was moved to the No. 4 Aston Martin Vantage AMR GT4 EVO in the GT4 America Series, paired with teammate Mike David Ortmann in the Silver Cup. The duo took 3rd place in the Silver Cup standings, securing overall victories at Road America and Indianapolis Motor Speedway.

Arthur returned to Toyota with JMF in 2026, this time in the TC America Series. He found success early, winning in three of the first four races. Arthur would win nine of the fourteen races to claim the championship, defeating Hyundai Motorsport driver Andre Castro in the final race at Indianapolis.

== Motorsports career results ==
(Bold – Pole position awarded)

Formula Pro USA Winter Series results
Year	Team	No.	Class	1	2	3	4	FPWSC	Pts	Ref
2023	Doran Motorsports	68	F4	**SON 1**; 3	SON 2; 2	THU 1; 2	THU 2; 3	2nd	68	

Toyota GR Cup North America results
Year	Team	No.	Make	1	2	3	4	5	6	7	8	9	10	11	12	13	14	TGRNAC	Pts	Ref
2024	JMF Motorsports	34	Toyota	SON 1; 16	SON 2; 11	SEB 1; 16	SEB 2; 17	COA 1 ret	COA 2; 9	VIR 1; 13	VIR 2 ret	ELK 1	ELK 2	ALA 1	ALA 2	IMS 1	IMS 2	T-23rd	4	

GT4 America Series results
Year	Team	No.	Make	1	2	3	4	5	6	7	8	9	10	11	12	13	GT4SC	Pts	Ref
2025	JMF Motorsports	4	Aston Martin	SON 1; 8	SON 2; 4	COA; 7	SEB 1; 10	SEB 2 ret	VIR 1; 10	VIR 2; 6	ELK 1; 16	ELK 2; 1	ALA 1; 3	ALA 2; 3	IMS 1; 2	IMS 2; 1	3rd	206	

TC America Series results
Year	Team	No.	Make	1	2	3	4	5	6	7	8	9	10	11	12	13	14	TCASC	Pts	Ref
2026	JMF Motorsports	4	Toyota	**SON 1**; 1	SON 2; 2	**COA 1**; 1	**COA 2**; 1	SEB 1 ret	SEB 2 ret	**ATL 1**; 1	**ATL 2**; 1	**ELK 1**; 1	**ELK 2**; 1	ALA 1 ret	ALA 2; 4	IMS 1; 1	IMS 2; 1	1st	259	

^{*} Season still in progress.
