= 2025 TC America Series =

Touring car racing season

The 2025 TC America Series Powered by Skip Barber Racing School was the seventh season of the TC America Series. The season began at Sonoma on March 28, and ended at Indianapolis on October 19.

== Calendar ==
The preliminary calendar released on June 26, 2024, featuring 16 races across seven rounds. On August 6, 2024, the calendar was finalized, and the date of Indianapolis round was pushed back two weeks.

Round	Circuit	Date	Map
1	Sonoma Raceway, Sonoma, California	March 28–30	2025 TC America Series is located in the United States
2	Circuit of the Americas, Austin, Texas	April 24–27	2025 TC America Series is located in the United States
3	Sebring International Raceway, Sebring, Florida	May 16–18	2025 TC America Series is located in the United States
4	Virginia International Raceway, Alton, Virginia	July 18–20	2025 TC America Series is located in the United States
5	Road America, Elkhart Lake, Wisconsin	August 15–17	2025 TC America Series is located in the United States
6	Barber Motorsports Park, Birmingham, Alabama	September 5–7	2025 TC America Series is located in the United States
7	Indianapolis Motor Speedway, Indianapolis, Indiana	October 16–19	2025 TC America Series is located in the United States

== Rule Changes ==
For 2025, the TCX and TC classes are now one class, called TC, with the TCA class eliminated. Races have been shortened to 25 minutes from 40 with two race weekends, Sebring and Barber consisting of 3 races.

== Entry list ==
Team	Car	No.	Drivers	Rounds
(United States) Skip Barber Racing	Acura Integra Type S	07	(United States) Michael Garcia	1–2
(United States) Skip Barber Racing	Acura Integra Type S	07	(United States) Mike Ogren	3
(United States) Skip Barber Racing	Acura Integra Type S	17	(United States) Dean Lambros	7
(United States) Skip Barber Racing	Toyota GR Corolla TC	61	(United States) James Klimas	All
(Canada) JMF Motorsports	Toyota GR Corolla TC	3	(Canada) Antonio Costantino	All
(Canada) JMF Motorsports	Toyota GR Corolla TC	4	(Canada) Jonathan Neudorf	All
(United States) Kaplan Racing Systems	BMW M2 CS (Cup)	18	(United States) Aaron Kaplan	1
(United States) Fast Track Racing	BMW M2 CS (Cup)	29	(United States) Nick Roberts	2
(United States) FTG Racing	Mazda 3 TC	69	(United States) Chris Taylor	6–7
(United States) FTG Racing	Mazda 3 TC	71	(United States) Joey Jordan	1, 4–7
(United States) FTG Racing	Mazda 3 TC	780	(United States) Sally McNulty	4–5
(United States) Ricca Autosport	Hyundai Elantra N1 TC Evo	74	(Canada) Alana Carter	6–7
(United States) Ricca Autosport	Hyundai Elantra N1 TC Evo	74	(South Korea) Gyumin Kim	2
(United States) Ricca Autosport	Hyundai Elantra N1 TC Evo	74	(Puerto Rico) CJ Sepulveda	3
(United States) Ricca Autosport	Hyundai Elantra N1 TC Evo	74	(United States) Andre Castro	4
(United States) Ricca Autosport	Hyundai Elantra N1 TC Evo	74	(United States) Justin Gravett	5
(United States) Ricca Autosport	Hyundai Elantra N1 TC Evo	75	(Canada) Connor Attrell	2–3, 6–7
(United States) Ricca Autosport	Hyundai Elantra N1 TC Evo	75	(United States) Antonio Abrom	1
(United States) Ricca Autosport	Hyundai Elantra N1 TC Evo	75	(Canada) Shelby Mills	5
(United States) Ricca Autosport	Hyundai Elantra N1 TC Evo	76	(Canada) PJ Groenke	All
(United States) Ricca Autosport	Hyundai Elantra N1 TC Evo	77	(Canada) Eric Kunz	2–7
(United States) Ricca Autosport	Hyundai Elantra N1 TC Evo	77	(Puerto Rico) CJ Sepulveda	1
(United States) Ricca Autosport	Hyundai Elantra N1 TC Evo	78	(United States) Jeff Ricca	2–7
(United States) Ricca Autosport	Hyundai Elantra N1 TC	78	(United States) Jeff Ricca	1
(United States) Ricca Autosport	Hyundai Elantra N1 TC Evo	79	(Puerto Rico) CJ Sepulveda	7

== Race results ==
Round		Circuit	Pole position	TC Winners	Results
1	R1	(California) Sonoma	(United States) #78 Ricca Autosport	(United States) #78 Ricca Autosport	Report
1	R1	(California) Sonoma	(United States) Jeff Ricca	(United States) Jeff Ricca	Report
1	R2	(California) Sonoma	(United States) #78 Ricca Autosport	(United States) #78 Ricca Autosport	Report
1	R2	(California) Sonoma	(United States) Jeff Ricca	(United States) Jeff Ricca	Report
2	R1	(Texas) Austin	(United States) #74 Ricca Autosport	(United States) #74 Ricca Autosport	Report
2	R1	(Texas) Austin	(South Korea) Gyumin Kim	(South Korea) Gyumin Kim	Report
2	R2	(Texas) Austin	(United States) #74 Ricca Autosport	(United States) #74 Ricca Autosport	Report
2	R2	(Texas) Austin	(South Korea) Gyumin Kim	(South Korea) Gyumin Kim	Report
3	R1	(Florida) Sebring	(United States) #78 Ricca Autosport	(United States) #78 Ricca Autosport	Report
3	R1	(Florida) Sebring	(United States) Jeff Ricca	(United States) Jeff Ricca	Report
3	R2	(Florida) Sebring	(United States) #78 Ricca Autosport	(United States) #78 Ricca Autosport	Report
3	R2	(Florida) Sebring	(United States) Jeff Ricca	(United States) Jeff Ricca	Report
3	R3	(Florida) Sebring	(United States) #78 Ricca Autosport	(United States) #78 Ricca Autosport	Report
3	R3	(Florida) Sebring	(United States) Jeff Ricca	(United States) Jeff Ricca	Report
4	R1	Virginia	(Canada) #4 JMF Motorsports	(Canada) #4 JMF Motorsports	Report
4	R1	Virginia	(Canada) Jonathan Neudorf	(Canada) Jonathan Neudorf	Report
4	R2	Virginia	(United States) #78 Ricca Autosport	(United States) #78 Ricca Autosport	Report
4	R2	Virginia	(United States) Jeff Ricca	(United States) Jeff Ricca	Report
5	R1	(Wisconsin) Road America	(United States) #78 Ricca Autosport	(United States) #78 Ricca Autosport	Report
5	R1	(Wisconsin) Road America	(United States) Jeff Ricca	(United States) Jeff Ricca	Report
5	R2	(Wisconsin) Road America	(United States) #78 Ricca Autosport	(United States) #78 Ricca Autosport	Report
5	R2	(Wisconsin) Road America	(United States) Jeff Ricca	(United States) Jeff Ricca	Report
6	R1	(Alabama) Barber	(United States) #78 Ricca Autosport	(Canada) #4 JMF Motorsports	Report
6	R1	(Alabama) Barber	(United States) Jeff Ricca	(Canada) Jonathan Neudorf	Report
6	R2	(Alabama) Barber	(United States) #78 Ricca Autosport	(Canada) #4 JMF Motorsports	Report
6	R2	(Alabama) Barber	(United States) Jeff Ricca	(Canada) Jonathan Neudorf	Report
6	R3	(Alabama) Barber	(United States) #78 Ricca Autosport	(Canada) #4 JMF Motorsports	Report
6	R3	(Alabama) Barber	(United States) Jeff Ricca	(Canada) Jonathan Neudorf	Report
7	R1	(Indiana) Indianapolis	(Canada) #4 JMF Motorsports	(Canada) #4 JMF Motorsports	Report
7	R1	(Indiana) Indianapolis	(Canada) Jonathan Neudorf	(Canada) Jonathan Neudorf	Report
7	R2	(Indiana) Indianapolis	(Canada) #4 JMF Motorsports	(Canada) #4 JMF Motorsports	Report
7	R2	(Indiana) Indianapolis	(Canada) Jonathan Neudorf	(Canada) Jonathan Neudorf	Report

== Championship standings ==
Scoring system

Championship points are awarded for the first ten positions in each race. Entries are required to complete 75% of the winning car's race distance in order to be classified and earn points.

Position	**1st**	**2nd**	**3rd**	**4th**	**5th**	**6th**	**7th**	**8th**	**9th**	**10th**
Points	25	18	15	12	10	8	6	4	2	1

=== Driver's championship ===
Pos.	Driver	Team	SON (California)		AUS (Texas)		SEB (Florida)			VIR (Virginia)		ELK (Wisconsin)		BAR (Alabama)			IMS (Indiana)		Points
Pos.	Driver	Team	RD1	RD2	RD1	RD2	RD1	RD2	RD3	RD1	RD2	RD1	RD2	RD1	RD2	RD3	RD1	RD2	Points
1	(United States) Jeff Ricca	(United States) Ricca Autosport	**1**	**1**	2	2	**1**	**1**	**1**	3	**1**	**1**	**1**	**6**	**2**	**2**	3	3	325
2	(Canada) Jonathan Neudorf	(Canada) JMF Motorsports	6	6	5	8	8	7	6	**1**	4	7	3	1	1	1	**1**	**1**	231
3	(Canada) PJ Groenke	(United States) Ricca Autosport	4	3	4	4	3	6	4	7	3	3	4	5	3	3	7	Ret	180
4	(Canada) Antonio Costantino	(Canada) JMF Motorsports	7	7	7	9	7	8	7	6	6	5	6	7	7	5	2	2	128
5	(Canada) Eric Kunz	(United States) Ricca Autosport			10	6	6	3	5	4	5	9	9	2	6	7	5	6	120
6	(Canada) Connor Attrell	(United States) Ricca Autosport			6	5	4	4	2					3	4	4	6	7	113
7	(United States) James Klimas	(United States) Skip Barber Racing	8	8	8	10	9	9	8	5	7	6	7	4	6	6	9	4	93
8	(Puerto Rico) CJ Sepulveda	(United States) Ricca Autosport	3	2			5	5	3								4	5	90
9	(United States) Michael Garcia	(United States) Skip Barber Racing	2	4	3	3													60
10	(South Korea) Gyumin Kim	(United States) Ricca Autosport			**1**	**1**													50
11	(United States) Mike Ogren	(United States) Skip Barber Racing					2	2	9										38
12	(United States) Andre Castro	(United States) Ricca Autosport								2	2								36
12	(United States) Justin Gravett	(United States) Ricca Autosport										2	2						36
13	(Canada) Shelby Mills	(United States) Ricca Autosport										4	5						22
14	(United States) Antonio Abrom	(United States) Ricca Autosport	5	5															20
15	(United States) Joey Jordan	(United States) FTG Racing								8	DNS	8	8				8	8	20
16	(United States) Nick Roberts	(United States) Fast Track Racing			9	7													8
17	(United States) Sally McNulty	(United States) FTG Racing								9	DNS	10	10						4
Pos.	Driver	Team	SON (California)		AUS (Texas)		SEB (Florida)			VIR (Virginia)		ELK (Wisconsin)		BAR (Alabama)			IMS (Indiana)		Points

Key
Colour	Result
Gold	Race winner
Silver	2nd place
Bronze	3rd place
Green	Points finish
Blue	Non-points finish
Blue	Non-classified finish (NC)
Purple	Did not finish (Ret)
Black	Disqualified (DSQ)
Black	Excluded (EX)
White	Did not start (DNS)
White	Race cancelled (C)
White	Withdrew (WD)
Blank	Did not participate

**Bold** – Pole

Italics – Fastest Lap

=== Team's championship ===
Pos.	Team	SON (California)		AUS (Texas)		SEB (Florida)			VIR (Virginia)		ELK (Wisconsin)		BAR (Alabama)			IMS (Indiana)		Points
Pos.	Team	RD1	RD2	RD1	RD2	RD1	RD2	RD3	RD1	RD2	RD1	RD2	RD1	RD2	RD3	RD1	RD2	Points
1	(United States) Ricca Autosport	**1**	**1**	**1**	**1**	**1**	**1**	**1**	2	**1**	**1**	**1**	**2**	**2**	**2**	2	3	355
2	(Canada) JMF Motorsports	3	3	3	4	3	3	2	**1**	2	2	2	1	1	1	**1**	**1**	309
3	(United States) Skip Barber Racing	2	2	2	2	2	2	3	3	3	3	3	3	3	3	4	2	258
4	(United States) FTG Racing								4	DNS	4	4	4	4	4	3	4	99
5	(United States) Fast Track Racing			4	3													27
Pos.	Team	SON (California)		AUS (Texas)		SEB (Florida)			VIR (Virginia)		ELK (Wisconsin)		BAR (Alabama)			IMS (Indiana)		Points

Key
Colour	Result
Gold	Race winner
Silver	2nd place
Bronze	3rd place
Green	Points finish
Blue	Non-points finish
Blue	Non-classified finish (NC)
Purple	Did not finish (Ret)
Black	Disqualified (DSQ)
Black	Excluded (EX)
White	Did not start (DNS)
White	Race cancelled (C)
White	Withdrew (WD)
Blank	Did not participate

**Bold** – Pole

Italics – Fastest Lap

=== Manufacturer's championship ===
Pos.	Manufacturer	SON (California)		AUS (Texas)		SEB (Florida)			VIR (Virginia)		ELK (Wisconsin)		BAR (Alabama)			IMS (Indiana)		Points
Pos.	Manufacturer	RD1	RD2	RD1	RD2	RD1	RD2	RD3	RD1	RD2	RD1	RD2	RD1	RD2	RD3	RD1	RD2	Points
1	(South Korea) Hyundai	**1**	**1**	**1**	**1**	**1**	**1**	**1**	2	**1**	**1**	**1**	**2**	**2**	**2**	3	3	352
2	(Japan) Toyota	3	3	3	4	3	3	2	**1**	2	2	2	1	1	1	**1**	**1**	309
3	(Japan) Acura	2	2	2	2	2	2	3								2	2	159
4	(Japan) Mazda								3	DNS	3	3	3	3	3	4	4	114
5	(Germany) BMW			4	3													27
Pos.	Manufacturer	SON (California)		AUS (Texas)		SEB (Florida)			VIR (Virginia)		ELK (Wisconsin)		BAR (Alabama)			IMS (Indiana)		Points

Key
Colour	Result
Gold	Race winner
Silver	2nd place
Bronze	3rd place
Green	Points finish
Blue	Non-points finish
Blue	Non-classified finish (NC)
Purple	Did not finish (Ret)
Black	Disqualified (DSQ)
Black	Excluded (EX)
White	Did not start (DNS)
White	Race cancelled (C)
White	Withdrew (WD)
Blank	Did not participate

**Bold** – Pole

Italics – Fastest Lap

=== Hyundai Cup ===
Drivers competing in the Hyundai Elantra N1 TC Evo are eligible for the Hyundai Cup. Scoring uses the same points system as the other championships. Other entries are made invisible.

Pos.	Driver	Team	AUS (Texas)		SEB (Florida)			BAR (Alabama)			IMS (Indiana)		Points
Pos.	Driver	Team	RD1	RD2	RD1	RD2	RD3	RD1	RD2	RD3	RD1	RD2	Points
1	(United States) Jeff Ricca	(United States) Ricca Autosport	2	2	**1**	**1**	**1**	**5**	**1**	**1**	1	**1**	221
2	(Canada) Connor Attrell	(United States) Ricca Autosport	4	4	3	3	2	3	3	4	4	5	136
3	(Canada) Eric Kunz	(United States) Ricca Autosport	5	5	5	2	5	2	4	5	3	3	128
4	(Canada) PJ Groenke	(United States) Ricca Autosport	3	3	2	5	4	4	2	2	**5**	Ret	128
5	(Puerto Rico) CJ Sepulveda	(United States) Ricca Autosport			4	4	3				2	2	75
6	(Canada) Alana Carter	(United States) Ricca Autosport						1	5	3	6	4	70
7	(South Korea) Gyumin Kim	(United States) Ricca Autosport	**1**	**1**									50
Pos.	Driver	Team	AUS (Texas)		SEB (Florida)			BAR (Alabama)			IMS (Indiana)		Points

Key
Colour	Result
Gold	Race winner
Silver	2nd place
Bronze	3rd place
Green	Points finish
Blue	Non-points finish
Blue	Non-classified finish (NC)
Purple	Did not finish (Ret)
Black	Disqualified (DSQ)
Black	Excluded (EX)
White	Did not start (DNS)
White	Race cancelled (C)
White	Withdrew (WD)
Blank	Did not participate

**Bold** – Pole

Italics – Fastest Lap

== See also ==
- 2025 TC France Series
