= Greg Moore Raceway =

Kart circuit in Chilliwack, British Columbia

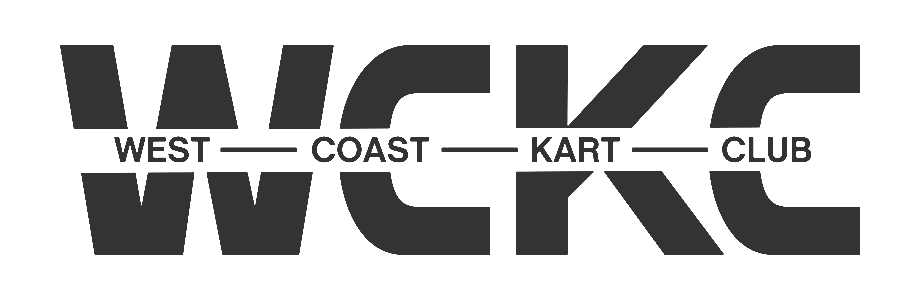
- WCKC logo (2024-Present)

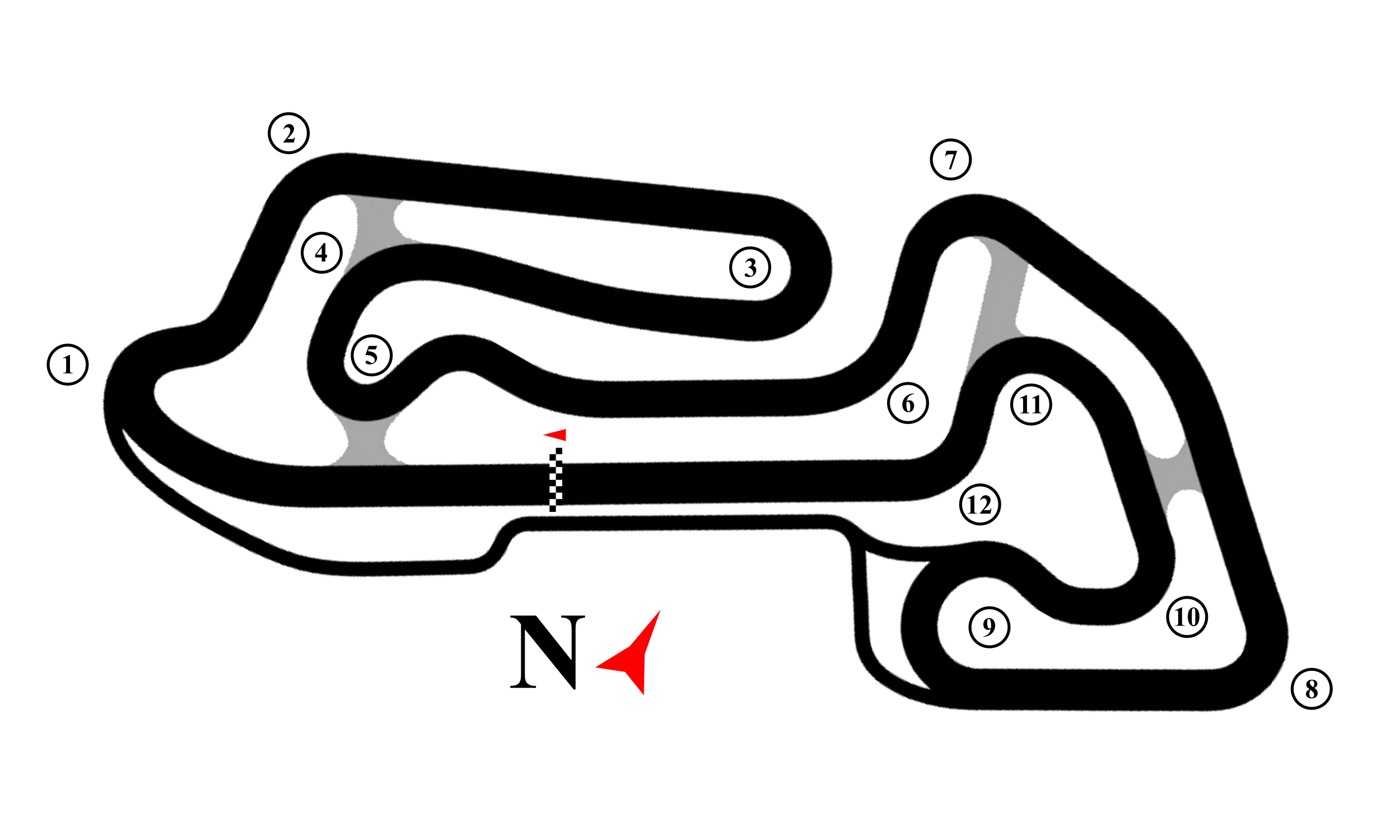
- Championship Circuit (2002-Present)
- Location: Chilliwack, British Columbia (Canada)
- Coordinates: 49°10′21″N 121°58′41″W
- Operator: West Coast Kart Club
- Opened: 2002; 24 years ago
- Former names: Chilliwack Area Race Track (CART BC)
- Website: westcoastkartclub.ca

Championship Circuit (2002–present)
- Surface: Asphalt
- Length: 1.224 km (0.761 mi)
- Turns: 12

Greg Moore Raceway is a 1.224 km kart circuit in Chilliwack, British Columbia. It is the only outdoor karting facility in the Lower Mainland. The circuit was completed in 2002, and is home to the West Coast Kart Club.

The venue was homologated to CIK-FIA Class B standards by the Commission Internationale de Karting in 2006. There are ten additional layouts available.

== History ==
Throughout the 1990s, kart racing in the Lower Mainland was primarily hosted in the parking lot of TRADEX in Abbotsford. Growing competition and the desire for a dedicated circuit prompted the organizers to secure land for construction.

The Chilliwack Area Race Track Association was formed in December of 2000. In January 2001, a deal was struck with the Skwá First Nation to build a racing circuit, and ground broke on leased land with Skwah Indian Reserve No. 4 later that year. Construction was not completed until June 2002 due to complications related to the lease agreement. The first race at the circuit was hosted in August of 2002.

The current owner and operator, West Coast Kart Club, was established following the merger of the Westwood Karting Association, Coastal Kart Racers, and track organizers CART BC. WKA had experienced a severe decline in membership after relocating from GMR to the significantly larger Mission Raceway Park and, under financial pressure, was subsequently absorbed into the other two clubs.

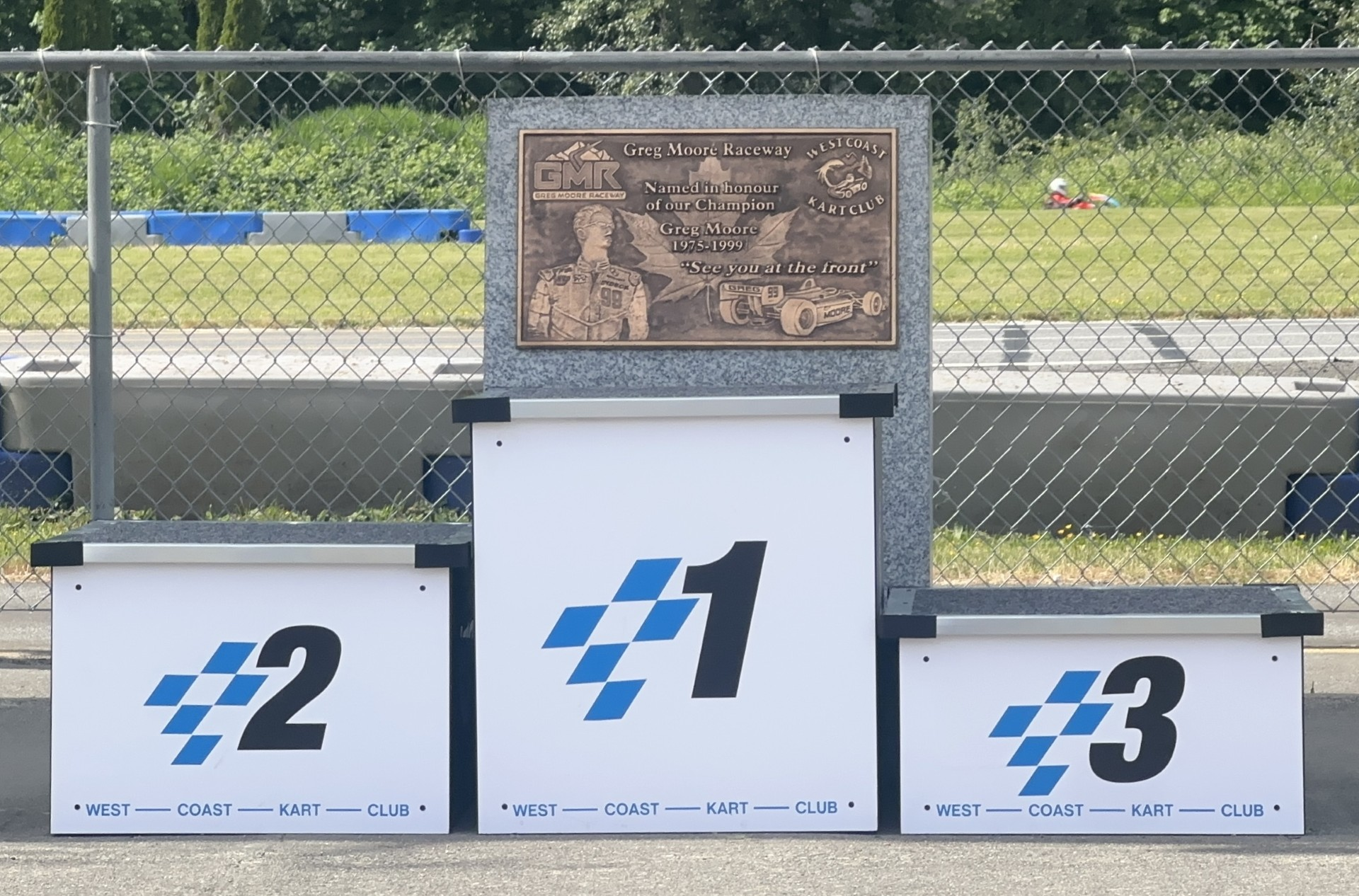
Podiums at WCKC and the Greg Moore memorial

Greg Moore Raceway is widely considered one of the most respected kart circuits in Canada. The track has previously hosted the North West Gold Cup, Can-Am Rotax Challenge, Western Canadian Championship and the Canadian National Championship. In 2023, it hosted the Max Karting Group Canada Final. Senior Max was won by Ariel Elkin, with British driver Oliver Hodgson securing the RMC Grand Final ticket.

The circuit was named in honor of the late Greg Moore, five-time CART race winner and native of nearby Maple Ridge. A small memorial to Moore has been placed underneath the scoring tower. Use of the number 99 has been retired at the club in his memory.

== In popular culture ==
Greg Moore Raceway was added to the 2013 sim racing game RFactor 2 as an additional track to the KartSim North America software in 2025.

The track served as the main filming location for the 2025 documentary Trackside by Marcus Eriksson.

== Alumni ==
- Braydon Arthur - TC America Series driver
- Nicole Havrda - F1 Academy driver
- Sting Ray Robb - IndyCar driver, trained at the circuit.
