= 2026 TC France Series =

French car racing championship

The 2026 Championnat de France FFSA Tourisme - TC France season was the sixth season of the French FFSA Tourisme Championship, a sports car and touring car championship created and organised by the Stephane Ratel Organisation (SRO). The season began on 3 April at Circuit Paul Armagnac and finished on 11 October at Circuit Paul Ricard.

The 2026 season introduced two new editions to the grid, the new BMW M2 Racing cars and the new TC6 cars.

== Calendar ==
Round	Circuit	Date
1	Circuit Paul Armagnac, Nogaro, France	3–6 April
2	Dijon-Prenois, Prenois, France	16–17 May
3	Circuit de Spa-Francorchamps, Stavelot, Belgium	20–21 June
4	Circuit de Nevers Magny-Cours, Magny-Cours, France	1–2 August
5	Circuit Paul Ricard, Le Castellet, France	10–11 October

== Entry list ==
Team	Car	No.	Drivers	Class	Rounds
TCR entries
(France) Optimum Racing by JP Concept Auto Sport	Cupra Leon Competición TCR	6	(France) Maxence Passaquet		1–3
(France) JSB Compétition	Hyundai Elantra N TCR	16	(France) Franck Salvi		2
(France) JSB Compétition	Hyundai Elantra N TCR	145	(France) Raphaël Fournier		1–3
(France) JSB Compétition	Cupra Leon Competición TCR	69	(France) Rodolphe Spitz		2–3
(France) Team Clairet Sport	Audi RS 3 LMS TCR (2021)	20	(France) Sébastien Thome		1–3
(France) Team Clairet Sport	Audi RS 3 LMS TCR (2021)	117	(France) Guillaume Savoldelli		1
(France) SP Compétition	Cupra León VZ TCR	22	(France) Gilles Chauvin		1–3
(France) SP Compétition	Cupra León VZ TCR	38	(France) Tom Pussier		1–3
(France) SP Compétition	Cupra Leon Competición TCR	71	(France) Stéphane Biajoux		1–3
(France) Comte Racing Team	Cupra Leon Competición TCR	107	(France) Pierre Bredeaux		1–3
(France) Comte Racing Team	Cupra Leon Competición TCR	107	(France) Nicolas Roumezy		1–3
GT Light entries
(France) Team CDRS	Ligier JS2 R	5	(France) Stéphane Codet		1, 3
(France) Team CDRS	Ligier JS2 R	8	(France) Pascal Trieux		1
(France) Team CDRS	Ligier JS2 R	8	(France) Guillaume Huber		3
(France) Team CDRS	Ligier JS2 R	23	(France) Christophe Veses		1, 3
(France) Team CDRS	Ligier JS2 R	29	(France) David Chiche		1
(France) Duc Racing	Ligier JS2 R	27	(France) Romain Duqueine		1–3
(France) Duc Racing	Ligier JS2 R	27	(France) Vincent Duqueine		1–3
(France) TCP Racing by STR	Ginetta G55 Cup	28	(France) Olivier Hulot		2–3
(France) TCP Racing by STR	Ginetta G55 Cup	28	(France) Thierry Pellerzi		2–3
(France) J'Nov Auto Racing by JSB	Ligier JS2 R	79	(France) Laurent Joubert		1–3
TC entries
(France) Team Pilote 69 by JSB	Peugeot 308 Racing Cup	3	(France) Brady Beltramelli		1–3
(France) Team Pilote 69 by JSB	Peugeot 308 Racing Cup	3	(France) José Beltramelli		1–3
(France) JSB Compétition	Peugeot 308 Racing Cup	7	(France) Mathis Briché		1–3
(France) JSB Compétition	Peugeot 308 Racing Cup	25	(France) Karel Eyoum		1–3
(France) JSB Compétition	Peugeot 308 Racing Cup	25	(France) Théo Vidal		1–3
(France) JSB Compétition	Peugeot 308 Racing Cup	78	(France) Denis Gibaud		1
(France) JSB Compétition	Peugeot 308 Racing Cup	78	(France) Martial Camurac		3
(France) STR	Ginetta G50 Cup	9	(France) Eric Oddos-Piantone		3
(France) 2RT	Peugeot 208 TC	49	(France) Kévin Ropars		1–3
(France) 2RT	Peugeot 208 TC	212	(France) Matthieu Collin		2–3
(France) JMRP Racing	Peugeot 308 Racing Cup	276	(France) Guillaume Lentier		3
TCA entries
(France) FRT by JSB Compétition	Renault Clio Cup IV	2	(France) Emma Ferstler		2
(France) FRT by JSB Compétition	Renault Clio Cup IV	2	(France) Gilles Ferstler		2
(France) AL Motorsports by JSB	Renault Clio Cup IV	24	(France) Yannis Lafon		1–3
(France) JSB Compétition	Renault Clio Cup IV	44	(France) Martial Camurac		1–2
(France) Team Clairet Sport	Peugeot 208 TC6	11	(France) Eric Coppens	L	1
(France) Team Clairet Sport	Peugeot 208 TC6	11	(France) Marvin Barinsky	L	2–3
(France) LB Compétition	Renault Clio Cup V	14	(France) Lucas Guichard		2
(France) Team Leal Compétition	Renault Clio Cup V	17	(France) Thomas Leal		1
(France) Team Leal Compétition	Renault Clio Cup IV	19	(France) Thierry Cardinaud		1
(France) Team Leal Compétition	Renault Clio Cup IV	33	(France) Claude Carlos		1–3
(France) Team Leal Compétition	Renault Clio Cup IV	33	(France) Julien Carlos		1–3
(France) Team Leal Compétition	Renault Clio Cup IV	55	(France) Patrick Pujol		1–3
(France) Team Leal Compétition	Renault Clio Cup IV	95	(France) Christophe Henry		1–3
(France) Team Leal Compétition	Renault Clio Cup IV	95	(France) Lubin Henry		1–3
(France) Optimum Racing by JP Concept Auto Sport	Renault Clio Cup IV	21	(France) Julien Pellegrini		1–3
(France) Optimum Racing by JP Concept Auto Sport	Renault Clio Cup IV	89	(France) Jacques Paget	L	2
(France) Optimum Racing by JP Concept Auto Sport	Renault Clio Cup IV	89	(France) Julien Paget	L	2
(France) Optimum Racing by JP Concept Auto Sport	Renault Clio Cup IV	93	(France) Christophe Petitjean		2–3
(France) Fox Racing Team	Renault Clio Cup IV	26	(France) Michel Béziat		1–3
(France) Fox Racing Team	Renault Clio Cup IV	26	(France) Bastien Girard		1–3
(France) Team CDRS	Mini Cooper F56 1.5T	64	(France) François Tillos	L	1
(France) Team CDRS	Mini Cooper F56 1.5T	64	(France) Jacques Tillos	L	1
(France) Sport Cup 88	Renault Clio Cup V	88	(France) Julien Morance		1
(France) Sport Cup 88	Renault Clio Cup V	88	(France) François Samy		1
(France) Team 3C	Renault Clio Cup IV	99	(France) Hervé Cuynet		2
(France) Beyond Virtual by 2RT	Peugeot 208 TC6	712	(France) Sébastien Bortot	L	1–3
TC Cup entries
(France) eXigence Motorsport	Mini JCW Challenge	37	(France) Christophe Gaillard		2–3
(France) ADWShop Motorsport	Mini Cooper R56 MCS-R	115	(France) Mickaël Boisdur		1–3
(France) ADWShop Motorsport	Mini Cooper R56 MCS-R	122	(France) Hugo Camilleri		3
(France) ADWShop Motorsport	Mini Cooper R56 MCS-R	129	(France) Grégory Linxe		1–2
(France) ADWShop Motorsport	Mini Cooper R56 MCS-R	129	(France) Richard Gino		1–2

Icon	Class
L	TCA Light

== Results ==
Bold indicates the overall winner.

Round		Circuit	Pole position	TCR Winners	GT Light Winners	TC Winners	TCA Winners	TCA Light Winners	TC Cup Winners
1	R1	(France) Circuit Paul Armagnac	(France) No. 107 Comte Racing Team	(France) No. 107 Comte Racing Team	(France) No. 5 Team CDRS	(France) No. 49 2RT	(France) No. 17 Team Leal Compétition	(France) No. 11 Team Clairet Sport	(France) No. 115 ADWShop Motorsport
1	R1	(France) Circuit Paul Armagnac	(France) Pierre Bredeaux	(France) Pierre Bredeaux	(France) Stéphane Codet	(France) Kévin Ropars	(France) Thomas Leal	(France) Eric Coppens	(France) Mickaël Boisdur
1	R2	(France) Circuit Paul Armagnac		(France) No. 117 Team Clairet Sport	(France) No. 5 Team CDRS	(France) No. 49 2RT	(France) No. 26 Fox Racing Team	(France) No. 11 Team Clairet Sport	(France) No. 115 ADWShop Motorsport
1	R2	(France) Circuit Paul Armagnac		(France) Guillaume Savoldelli	(France) Stéphane Codet	(France) Kévin Ropars	(France) Bastien Girard	(France) Eric Coppens	(France) Mickaël Boisdur
1	R3	(France) Circuit Paul Armagnac	(France) No. 117 Team Clairet Sport	(France) No. 6 Optimum Racing by JP Concept Auto Sport	(France) No. 29 Team CDRS	(France) No. 49 2RT	(France) No. 33 Team Leal Compétition	(France) No. 11 Team Clairet Sport	(France) No. 129 ADWShop Motorsport
1	R3	(France) Circuit Paul Armagnac	(France) Guillaume Savoldelli	(France) Maxence Passaquet	(France) David Chiche	(France) Kévin Ropars	(France) Claude Carlos	(France) Eric Coppens	(France) Richard Gino
1	R4	(France) Circuit Paul Armagnac		(France) No. 117 Team Clairet Sport	(France) No. 5 Team CDRS	(France) No. 3 Team Pilote 69 by JSB	(France) No. 26 Fox Racing Team	(France) No. 11 Team Clairet Sport	(France) No. 129 ADWShop Motorsport
1	R4	(France) Circuit Paul Armagnac		(France) Guillaume Savoldelli	(France) Stéphane Codet	(France) Brady Beltramelli	(France) Bastien Girard	(France) Eric Coppens	(France) Richard Gino
2	R1	(France) Circuit de Dijon-Prenois	(France) No. 145 JSB Compétition	(France) No. 145 JSB Compétition	(France) No. 28 TCP Racing by STR	(France) No. 49 2RT	(France) No. 26 Fox Racing Team	(France) No. 11 Team Clairet Sport	(France) No. 37 eXigence Motorsport
2	R1	(France) Circuit de Dijon-Prenois	(France) Raphaël Fournier	(France) Raphaël Fournier	(France) Olivier Hulot	(France) Kévin Ropars	(France) Bastien Girard	(France) Marvin Barinsky	(France) Christophe Gaillard
2	R2	(France) Circuit de Dijon-Prenois		(France) No. 145 JSB Compétition	(France) No. 27 Duc Racing	(France) No. 3 Team Pilote 69 by JSB	(France) No. 33 Team Leal Compétition	(France) No. 11 Team Clairet Sport	(France) No. 37 eXigence Motorsport
2	R2	(France) Circuit de Dijon-Prenois		(France) Raphaël Fournier	(France) Romain Duqueine	(France) José Beltramelli	(France) Claude Carlos	(France) Marvin Barinsky	(France) Christophe Gaillard
2	R3	(France) Circuit de Dijon-Prenois	(France) No. 145 JSB Compétition	(France) No. 107 Comte Racing Team	(France) No. 79 J'Nov Auto Racing by JSB	(France) No. 49 2RT	(France) No. 93 Optimum Racing by JP Concept Auto Sport	(France) No. 11 Team Clairet Sport	(France) No. 115 ADWShop Motorsport
2	R3	(France) Circuit de Dijon-Prenois	(France) Raphaël Fournier	(France) Pierre Bredeaux	(France) Laurent Joubert	(France) Kévin Ropars	(France) Christophe Petitjean	(France) Marvin Barinsky	(France) Mickaël Boisdur
2	R4	(France) Circuit de Dijon-Prenois		(France) No. 145 JSB Compétition	(France) No. 27 Duc Racing	(France) No. 49 2RT	(France) No. 33 Team Leal Compétition	(France) No. 11 Team Clairet Sport	(France) No. 37 eXigence Motorsport
2	R4	(France) Circuit de Dijon-Prenois		(France) Raphaël Fournier	(France) Romain Duqueine	(France) Kévin Ropars	(France) Julien Carlos	(France) Marvin Barinsky	(France) Christophe Gaillard
3	R1	(Belgium) Circuit de Spa-Francorchamps	(France) No. 107 Comte Racing Team	(France) No. 20 Team Clairet Sport	(France) No. 29 Team CDRS	(France) No. 49 2RT	(France) No. 21 Optimum Racing by JP Concept Auto Sport	(France) No. 11 Team Clairet Sport	(France) No. 115 ADWShop Motorsport
3	R1	(Belgium) Circuit de Spa-Francorchamps	(France) Pierre Bredeaux	(France) Sébastien Thome	(France) David Chiche	(France) Kévin Ropars	(France) Julien Pellegrini	(France) Marvin Barinsky	(France) Mickaël Boisdur
3	R2	(Belgium) Circuit de Spa-Francorchamps		(France) No. 145 JSB Compétition	(France) No. 5 Team CDRS	(France) No. 49 2RT	(France) No. 95 Team Leal Compétition	(France) No. 11 Team Clairet Sport	(France) No. 122 ADWShop Motorsport
3	R2	(Belgium) Circuit de Spa-Francorchamps		(France) Raphaël Fournier	(France) Stéphane Codet	(France) Kévin Ropars	(France) Lubin Henry	(France) Marvin Barinsky	(France) Hugo Camilleri
3	R3	(Belgium) Circuit de Spa-Francorchamps	(France) No. 20 Team Clairet Sport	(France) No. 107 Comte Racing Team	(France) No. 5 Team CDRS	(France) No. 49 2RT	(France) No. 21 Optimum Racing by JP Concept Auto Sport	(France) No. 11 Team Clairet Sport	(France) No. 115 ADWShop Motorsport
3	R3	(Belgium) Circuit de Spa-Francorchamps	(France) Sébastien Thome	(France) Pierre Bredeaux	(France) Stéphane Codet	(France) Kévin Ropars	(France) Julien Pellegrini	(France) Marvin Barinsky	(France) Mickaël Boisdur
3	R4	(Belgium) Circuit de Spa-Francorchamps		(France) No. 38 SP Compétition	(France) No. 5 Team CDRS	(France) No. 49 2RT	(France) No. 26 Fox Racing Team	(France) No. 11 Team Clairet Sport	(France) No. 122 ADWShop Motorsport
3	R4	(Belgium) Circuit de Spa-Francorchamps		(France) Tom Pussier	(France) Stéphane Codet	(France) Kévin Ropars	(France) Bastien Girard	(France) Marvin Barinsky	(France) Hugo Camilleri
4	R1	(France) Circuit de Nevers Magny-Cours							
4	R2	(France) Circuit de Nevers Magny-Cours							
4	R3	(France) Circuit de Nevers Magny-Cours							
4	R4	(France) Circuit de Nevers Magny-Cours							
5	R1	(France) Circuit Paul Ricard							
5	R2	(France) Circuit Paul Ricard							
5	R3	(France) Circuit Paul Ricard							
5	R4	(France) Circuit Paul Ricard							

== Championship standings ==
=== Scoring system ===
Championship points are awarded for the first ten positions in each race. Entries are required to complete 75% of the winning car's race distance in order to be classified and earn points.

Position	1st	2nd	3rd	4th	5th	6th	7th	8th	9th	10th
Points	25	18	15	12	10	8	6	4	2	1

== See also ==
- 2026 TC America Series
