= Andre Castro (racing driver) =

American racing driver (born 1999)

- Nationality: American
- Born: January 6, 1999 (age 27) New York City, New York, U.S.

TC America Series career
- Debut season: 2025
- Current team: Ricca Autosport
- Car number: 77

Previous series
- 2026 2023–2025 2017, 2021, 2023 2022 2022 2021 2019–2020: IMSA Michelin Pilot Challenge; NASCAR Xfinity Series; USF2000 Championship; United States F4 Championship; USF Juniors; Formula Ford Festival; NASCAR Whelen Euro Series

Awards
- 2021: Team USA Scholarship

Andre Castro (born January 6, 1999) is an American racing driver from New York City. He competes in the TC America TC class for Ricca Autosport, driving the No. 77 Hyundai Elantra N1 TC Evo. He has also competed in the TCR class of the IMSA Michelin Pilot Challenge for Bryan Herta Autosport, the NASCAR Xfinity Series, the USF2000 Championship, USF Juniors, the United States F4 Championship and the NASCAR Whelen Euro Series.

Castro was a recipient of the 2021 Team USA Scholarship and finished third in the 2021 Formula Ford Festival.

== Early life and education ==
Castro was born and raised in New York City. His family is originally from Colombia, and he is a first-generation Colombian American. He began karting at the age of seven.

Castro attended Stuyvesant High School in New York City. He later attended the University of Chicago, where he earned a bachelor's degree in economics with a specialization in business in 2022.

== Racing career ==
=== Early career ===
Castro began karting at age seven and later moved into car racing. He won a Skip Barber Karts to Cars scholarship and recorded three victories, five pole positions and ten podium finishes in the 2016 Skip Barber Racing Series.

In 2017, he competed in four races in the U.S. F2000 National Championship for Newman Wachs Racing.

Castro later competed in the NASCAR Whelen Euro Series. In 2019, he recorded four podium finishes and one pole position. He returned to the series in 2020 with DF1 Racing.

=== Team USA Scholarship and Formula Ford ===
Castro returned to open-wheel competition on a part-time basis in 2021, competing in USF2000 and the F1600 Championship Series.

In October 2021, Castro and Max Esterson were selected as recipients of the Team USA Scholarship. They competed in the Formula Ford Festival at Brands Hatch and the Walter Hayes Trophy at Silverstone Circuit.

Castro finished third in the Formula Ford Festival Grand Final, while Esterson finished second, giving Team USA two drivers on the podium.

=== USF Juniors and Formula 4 ===
In 2022, Castro competed in the inaugural USF Juniors season with International Motorsport. He finished fifth in the championship and recorded one podium finish.

He also competed in the United States F4 Championship during the 2022 season, recording one pole position and four podium finishes.

Castro returned to the USF2000 Championship for two races in 2023.

=== NASCAR Xfinity Series ===
Castro made his NASCAR Xfinity Series debut in 2023 at the Chicago Street Course. He made five Xfinity Series starts between 2023 and 2025.

His fifth start came at the 2025 Chicago Street Race, where he drove the No. 35 Chevrolet for Joey Gase Motorsports.

=== Touring-car racing ===
==== TC America ====
Castro entered Hyundai touring-car competition with Ricca Autosport during the 2025 TC America season. He made his TC America debut at Virginia International Raceway, finishing second in both races.

For 2026, Castro joined Ricca Autosport for a full TC America campaign in the TC class, driving the No. 77 Hyundai Elantra N1 TC Evo.

During the first eight races of the season, Castro recorded three victories and seven podium finishes. He won once at Sonoma Raceway and swept both races at Sebring International Raceway. He also recorded two third-place finishes at Circuit of the Americas and a second-place finish at Michelin Raceway Road Atlanta.

At Road America in August 2026, Castro finished third in the first race and second in the second race, extending his season total to nine podium finishes in ten races. Following the event, he was seven points behind championship leader Braydon Arthur with four races remaining.

Castro also competed in the Hyundai N Trophy Cup and led the Trophy Cup standings following the Road America round.

==== IMSA Michelin Pilot Challenge ====
In January 2026, Castro made his IMSA Michelin Pilot Challenge debut in the season-opening BMW M Endurance Challenge at Daytona International Speedway. He shared the No. 98 Bryan Herta Autosport with Curb Agajanian Hyundai Elantra N TCR with Madison Aust and Mark Wilkins.

The trio finished fourth in the TCR class.

== Racing record ==
=== Career summary ===
Season	Series	Team	Races	Wins	Poles	Podiums	Points	Position
2017	U.S. F2000 National Championship	Newman Wachs Racing	4	0	0	0	25	29th
2019	NASCAR Whelen Euro Series – Elite 2	PK Carsport	8	0	1	4	280	18th
2019	NASCAR Whelen Euro Series – Elite 2	Marko Stipp Motorsport	3	0	0	0	280	18th
2020	EuroNASCAR 2	DF1 Racing	3	0	0	0	88	24th
2021	Formula Ford Festival	Low Dempsey Racing	1	0	0	1	—	3rd
2021	F1600 Championship Series	Rice Race Prep	3	0	0	1	64	36th
2021	USF2000 Championship	Legacy Autosport	6	0	0	0	45	25th
2022	USF Juniors	International Motorsport	16	0	0	1	233	5th
2022	United States F4 Championship	Future Star Racing	9	0	1	4	78.5	8th
2023	USF2000 Championship	Future Star Racing	2	0	0	0	13	33rd
2023	NASCAR Xfinity Series	Jesse Iwuji Motorsports	2	0	0	0	2	67th
2024	NASCAR Xfinity Series	SS-Green Light Racing	2	0	0	0	16	67th
2025	NASCAR Xfinity Series	Joey Gase Motorsports	1	0	0	0	4	71st
2025	TC America Series	Ricca Autosport	2	0	0	2	36	12th
2026	TC America Series	Ricca Autosport	14	4	7	11	244	2nd
2026	IMSA Michelin Pilot Challenge – TCR	Bryan Herta Autosport	1	0	0	0	—	—

* Season in progress.

=== NASCAR Xfinity Series ===
Year	Team	No.	Make	Starts	Best finish	Points position
2023	Jesse Iwuji Motorsports	34	Chevrolet	2	36th	67th
2024	SS-Green Light Racing	14	Chevrolet	2	23rd	67th
2025	Joey Gase Motorsports	35	Chevrolet	1	33rd	71st
