= TC America Series =

Touring car racing series based in the United States

- Category: Touring cars
- Country: United States
- Inaugural season: 2019
- Official website: http://www.tcamerica.us

The TC America Series (known as TC America Series Powered by Skip Barber Racing School for sponsorship reasons) is a touring car racing series based in the United States. It is managed by the Stéphane Ratel Organisation and sanctioned by the United States Auto Club.

== History ==
With the separation of classes from the Pirelli World Challenge, WC Vision and the SRO Motorsport Group created the TC America Series, for cars that previously competed in the TC / TCA / TCR categories. For the initial season of 2019, there were 8 events with 2 40-minute races. A DSG Cup was also announced for cars equipped with DSG transmission. For the 2025 season, the TCX and TC classes were combined, while the TCA class was discontinued. On February 19, 2026, Skip Barber Racing School, renewed as title sponsor of the series in a new multi-year agreement.

== Champions ==
Year	TCR	TCR DSG Cup	TCA	TC
2019	(United States) Michael Hurczyn (United States) FCP Euro (Germany) Volkswagen	(United States) Brian Putt (United States) eEuroparts.com ROWE Racing & BSport Racing (Germany) Audi	(United States) Tyler Maxson (United States) Copeland Motorsports (Japan) Mazda	(Denmark) Johan Schwartz (United States) Rooster Hall Racing (Germany) BMW
Year	TCR	TCR DSG Cup	TCA	TC
2020	(United States) Tyler Maxson (United States) Copeland Motorsports (South Korea) Hyundai		(United States) Kevin Boehm (United States) Hard Motorsport (Japan) Honda	(United States) James Clay (United Kingdom) MINI JCW Team (Germany) BMW
Year	TCX	TC	TCA	
2021	(United States) Jacob Ruud (United States) Classic BMW (Germany) BMW	(United States) Caleb Bacon (United States) Forbush Performance (South Korea) Hyundai	(United States) Eric Powell (United States) Skip Barber Racing School (Germany) BMW	
2022	(United States) Jacob Ruud (United States) Fast Track Racing (Germany) BMW	(United States) Kevin Boehm (United States) Skip Barber Racing School (Japan) Honda	(United States) Gresham Wagner (United States) TechSport Racing (Japan) Subaru	
2023	(United States) Colin Garrett (United States) Rooster Hall Racing (Germany) BMW	(United States) Clayton Williams (United States) MINI JCW Team (United Kingdom) Mini	(United States) Spencer Bucknum (United States) LA Honda World Racing (Japan) Honda	
2024	(United States) Chris Walsh (United States) Carrus Callas Raceteam (Germany) BMW	(United States) Jeff Ricca (United States) Ricca Autosport (South Korea) Hyundai	(Canada) P.J. Groenke (United States) MINI JCW Team (United Kingdom) Mini	
Year	TC			
2025	(United States) Jeff Ricca (United States) Ricca Autosport (South Korea) Hyundai			
2026	(Canada) Braydon Arthur (Canada) JMF Motorsports (Japan) Toyota			
