= Toyota GR Corolla =

High-performance variant of the E210 Toyota Corolla

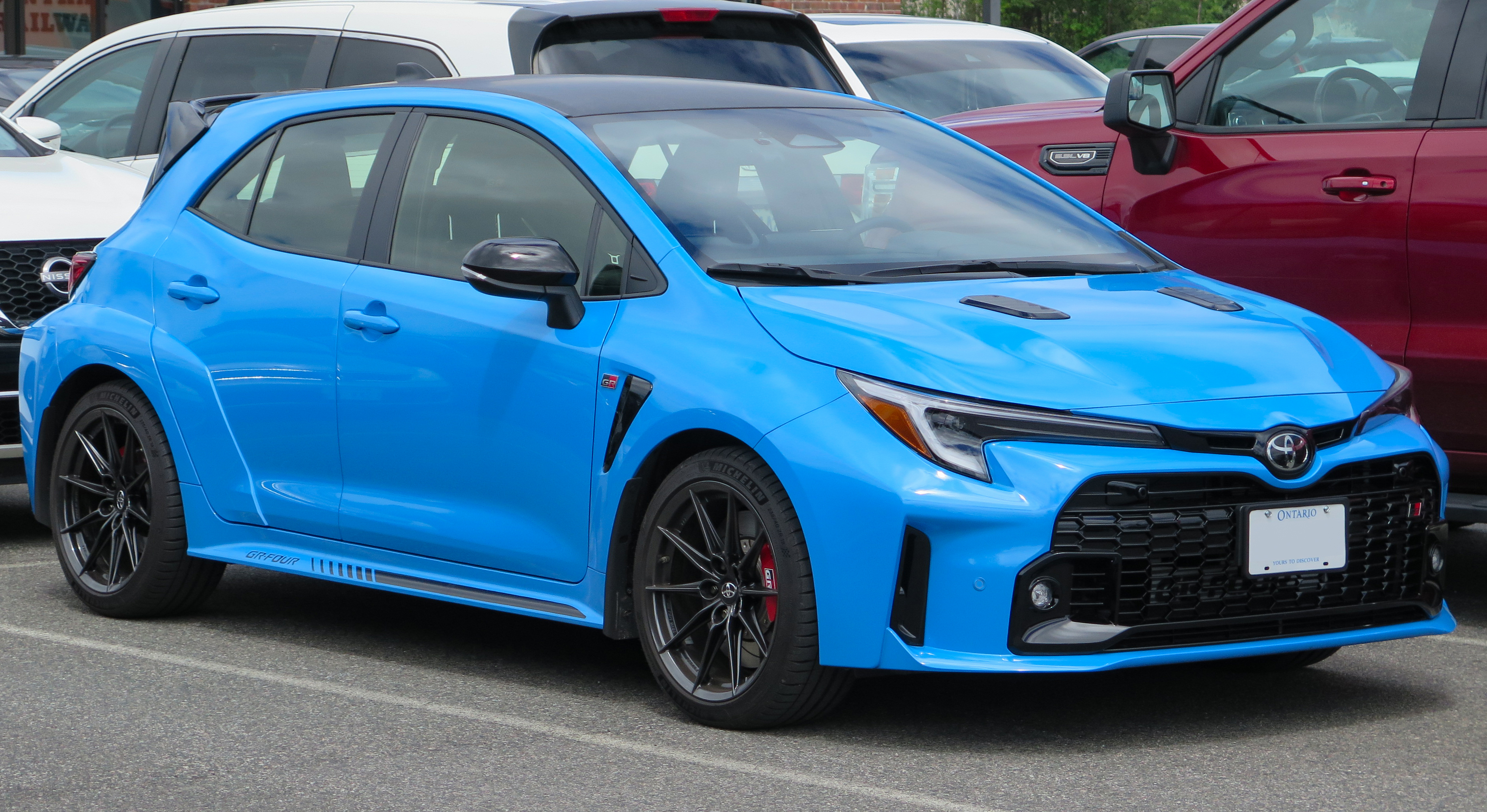
- 2024 GR Corolla Circuit Edition (Canada)

Overview
- Manufacturer: Toyota
- Model code: GZEA14
- Production: 2022–present
- Model years: 2023–present
- Assembly: Japan: Toyota, Aichi (Motomachi plant); United Kingdom: Burnaston, England (TMUK, from 2026)
- Designer: Sungwon Lee and Masayuki Sugiura

Body and chassis
- Class: Hot hatch / sport compact (C)
- Body style: 5-door hatchback
- Layout: Front-engine, four-wheel-drive
- Platform: TNGA: GA-C
- Related: Toyota Corolla (E210); Toyota GR Yaris

Powertrain
- Engine: Gasoline: 1618 cc G16E-GTS turbo I3
- Power output: 221–224 kW (296–300 hp; 300–304 PS)
- Transmission: 6-speed EA67F manual; 6-speed EA68F manual (Morizo Edition); 8-speed "GR-DAT" automatic (2024–present)

Dimensions
- Wheelbase: 2,640 mm (103.9 in)
- Length: 4,410 mm (173.6 in)
- Width: 1,850 mm (72.8 in)
- Height: 1,450–1,455 mm (57.1–57.3 in)
- Curb weight: 1,440–1,493 kg (3,175–3,292 lb)

The Toyota GR Corolla (Japanese: トヨタ・GRカローラ, Hepburn: Toyota Jīāru Karōra) is a sport compact car manufactured by Japanese marque Toyota since 2022 with assistance from the company's Gazoo Racing (GR) division. It is a hot hatch variant of the E210 series Corolla.

The GR Corolla was introduced on March 31, 2022 for the 2023 model year. The GR Corolla is built mainly for the North American market as Europe received the GR Yaris (which is not sold in Canada and the United States). Both vehicles are assembled at the "GR Factory" inside the Motomachi plant, a production line dedicated to GR-branded vehicles. Aside from North America, the GR Corolla is also sold in Japan, Thailand, Malaysia, Australia, New Zealand, Brazil, South Africa, Indonesia, the Philippines, and Middle East (starting 2026).

== Overview ==
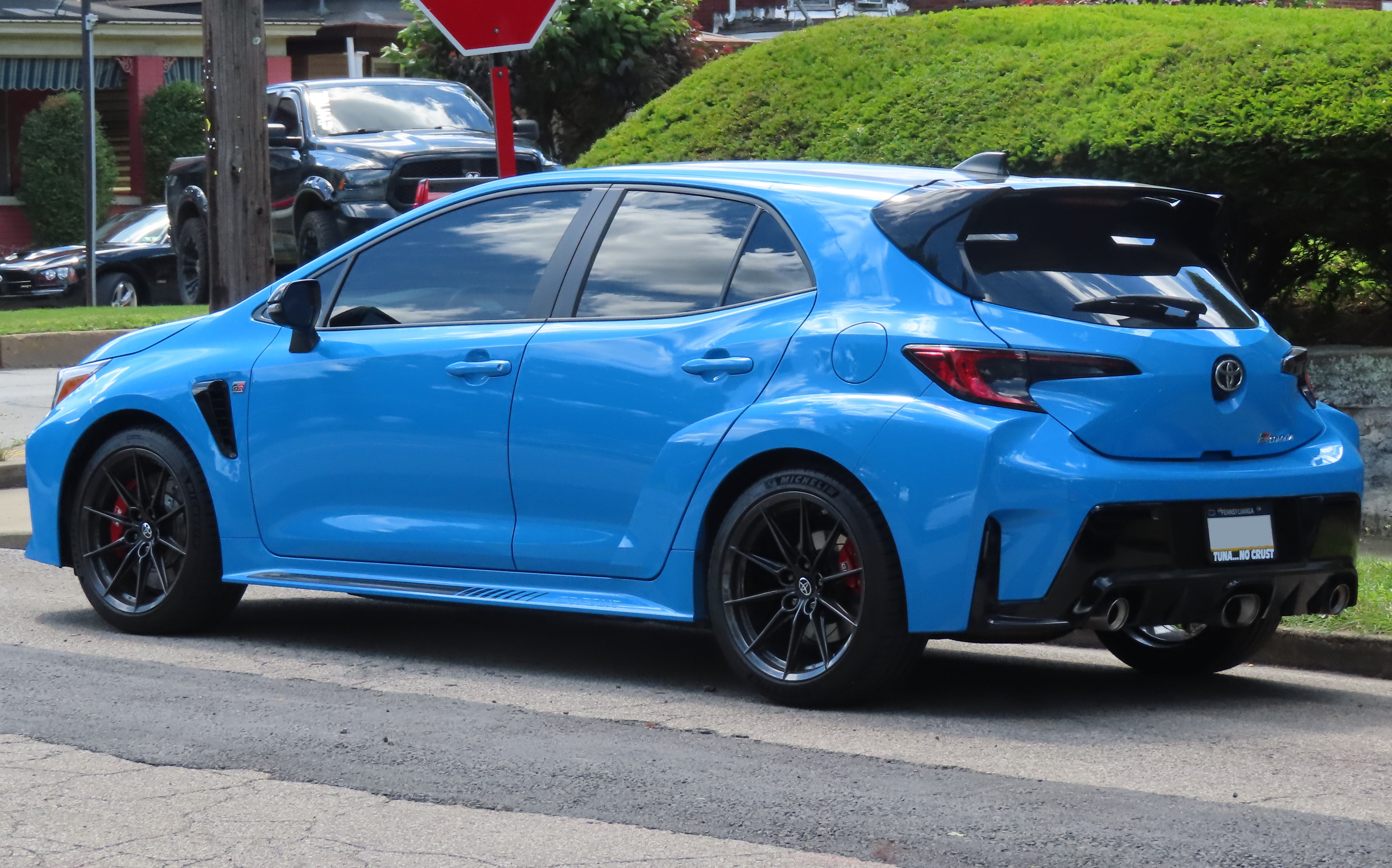
Rear view

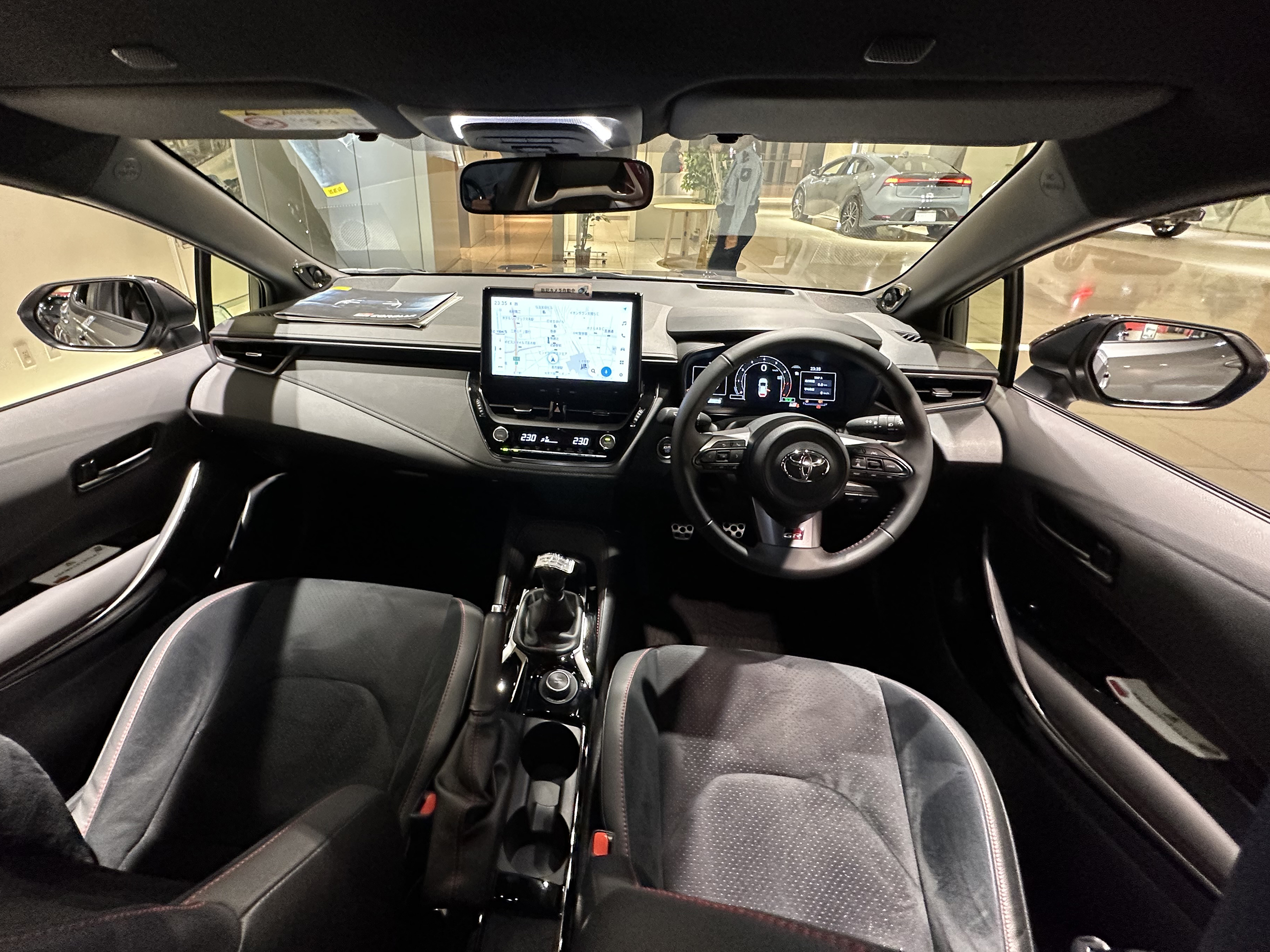
Interior

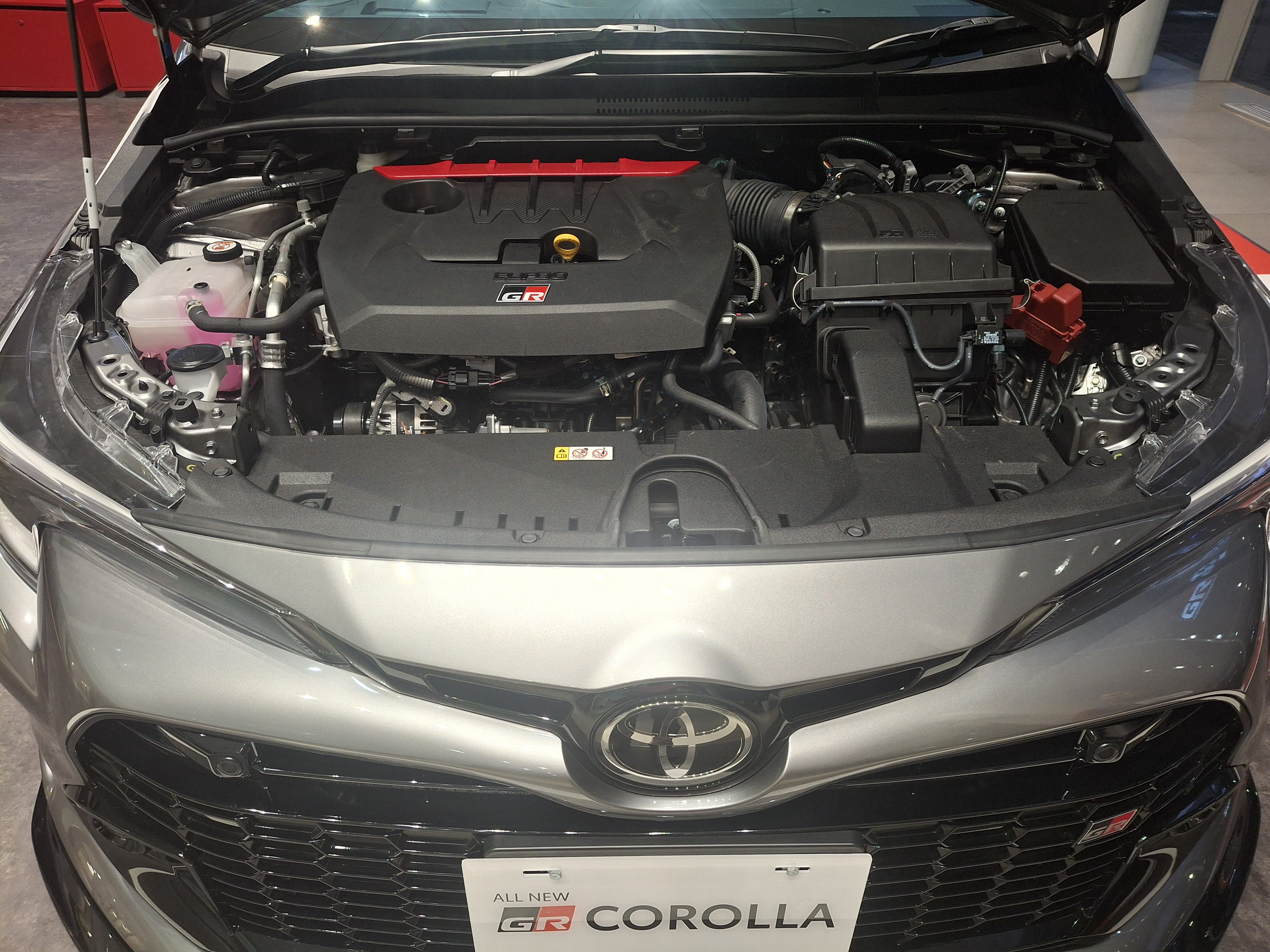
G16E-GTS engine

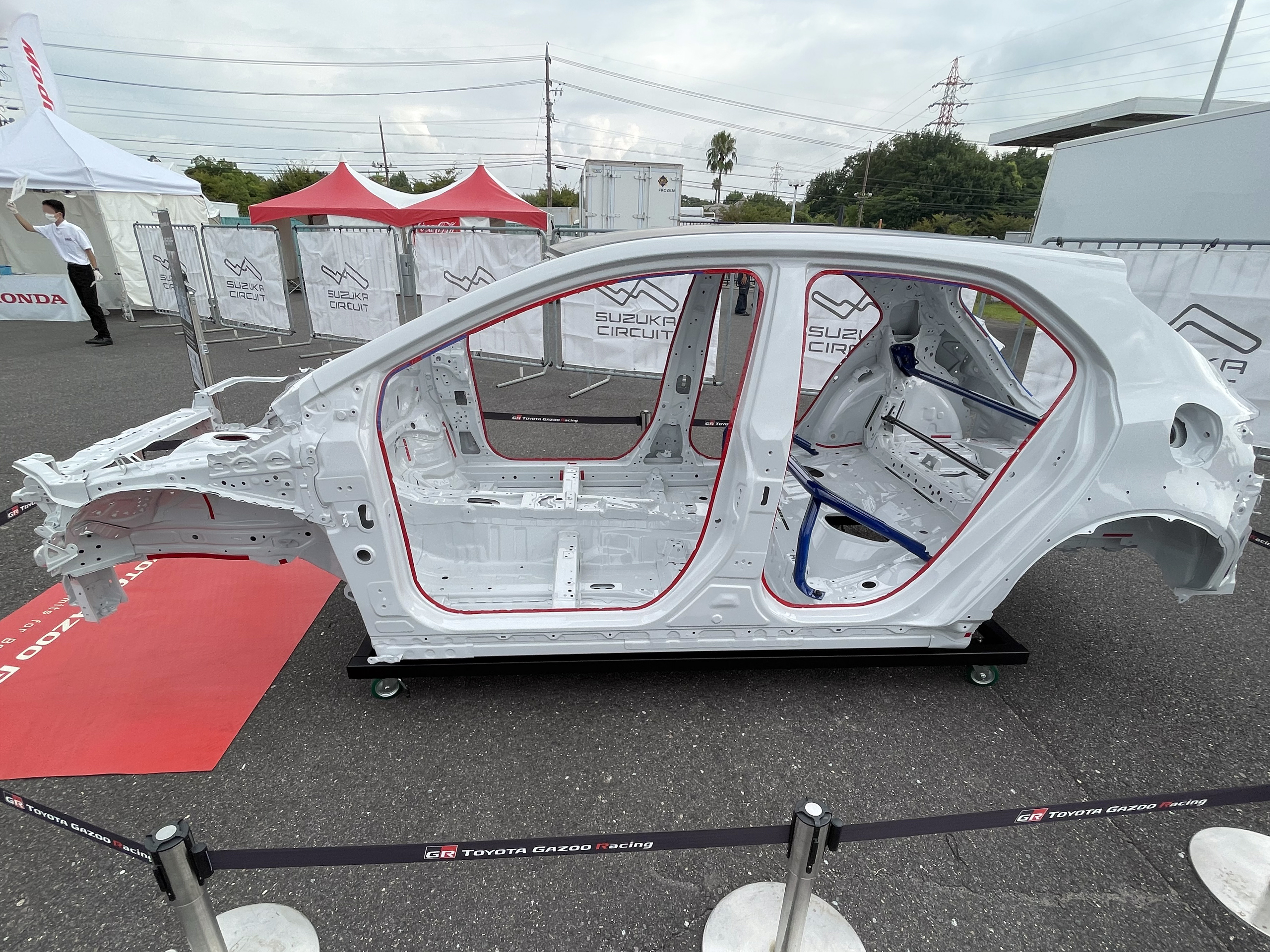
GR Corolla chassis

In 2020, Toyota unveiled the GR Yaris, a hatchback developed by the company's Gazoo Racing (GR) division for its World Rally Championship (WRC) team. It is not sold in the United States and Canada because the regular Yaris, upon which it is nominally based, isn't sold in those markets during this period due to low sales and the discontinuation of the model.

The decision led to years of speculation that Toyota would eventually bring a hot hatch to the United States and Canada. The introduction of the vehicle was scheduled to be revealed in 2021 but it was delayed by a year to 2022, because Akio Toyoda, then CEO of Toyota, also a racing driver, was not satisfied with the tuning of a prototype, and asked the GR team to make changes. Development of the vehicle was led by chief engineer Naoyuki Sakamoto.

On March 31, 2022, the GR Corolla was introduced for the 2023 model year, which while based on the larger E210 series Corolla compact hatchback, includes several features originally developed for the GR Yaris. The vehicle is powered by the 1.6-liter G16E-GTS turbocharged straight-three engine that powers the GR Yaris. The version of the engine found in the GR Yaris makes up to 200 kW (268 hp; 272 PS), but the version for the GR Corolla generates 221–224 kW (296–300 hp; 300–304 PS) and 370–400 N⋅m (273–295 lbf⋅ft) of torque. Among other strategies to achieve this increased power output, the GR Corolla has three tailpipes for reduced backpressure. A six-speed manual transmission is standard in the GR Corolla.

The GR Corolla also uses the GR-Four all-wheel drive system first developed for the GR Yaris. The standard setting is a 60:40 front to rear torque distribution, but it can go as rear-wheel biased as 30:70.

The vehicle is equipped with Toyota Safety Sense 3.0 suite of advanced driver-assistance systems and Toyota's updated audio multimedia system that debuted on the XK70 series Tundra.

The GR Corolla is produced alongside the GR Yaris at the "GR Factory" inside Toyota's Motomachi plant. Unlike most automobile plants, the "GR Factory" does not use a conveyor belt assembly line. Instead, vehicles are built at stations with more manual assembly processes. The "GR Factory" employs experienced technicians recruited from throughout the company. It was announced in May 2025 that the GR Corolla for the North American market will be produced in Burnaston, England. On May 5, 2026, the first GR Corollas produced in Burnaston, England, arrived in the United States.

== Pre-facelift ==
Depending on the countries, the GR Corolla is offered in at least one of three different model grades. The Core is the base model, the upgrade model is marketed as RZ in Japan, or Circuit Edition in North America, and the light weight ready-to-race model is the Morizo Edition.

=== Core ===
Toyota GR Corolla Core without hood vents (US)

The Core is the most affordable GR Corolla as it doesn't feature carbon fiber roof, hood bulge with vents, and other features. The Core model is offered in North America, Brazil, and South Africa.

A better equipped model based on the Core is marketed in the United States and Canada for 2024 model year as the Premium model. It comes standard with front and rear Torsen limited-slip differentials, front and rear parking sensors, and red brake calipers. The interior was also upgraded with suede-trimmed interior, heated seats and steering wheel, as well as JBL Premium sound system.

=== RZ / Circuit Edition ===
The Circuit Edition is a higher grade of the GR Corolla which offers performance upgrades such as Torsen limited-slip differentials for the front and rear axles (optional for the Core trim level). It also offers a forged carbon fiber roof, hood bulge with functional vents, a larger rear spoiler, and other upgrades.

For the Japanese market, beside the Morizo Edition, the regular GR Corolla is only available as the fully-equipped RZ trim level. Rear fog lamps, heated side mirrors, Head-Up Display (HUD), heated steering wheel, and heated seats are optional.

In New Zealand, Indonesia, Malaysia, and Thailand, the only model offered is the one similar to the Circuit Edition. The Australian GR Corolla GTS is the equivalent of Japanese RZ or North American Circuit Edition.

=== Morizo Edition ===
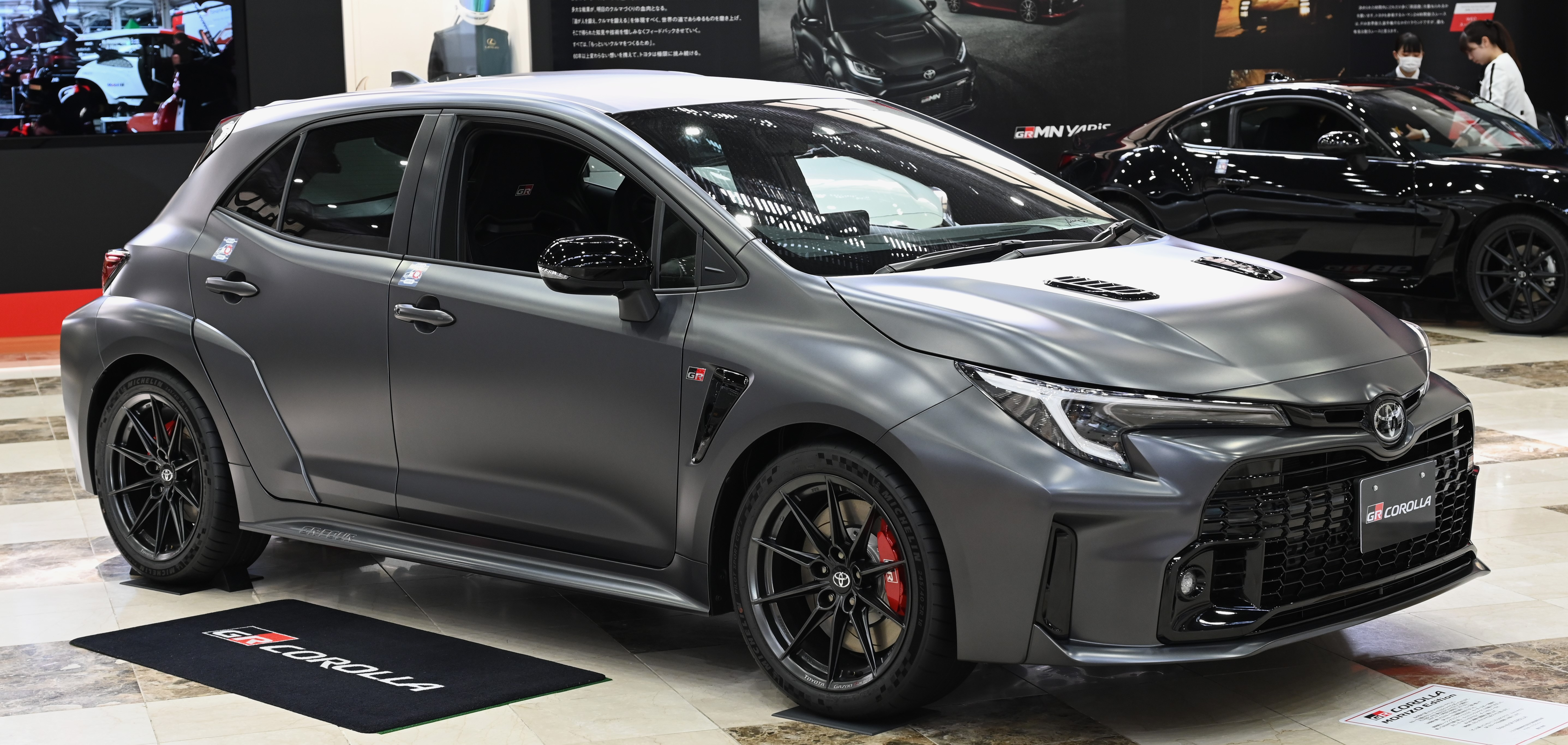

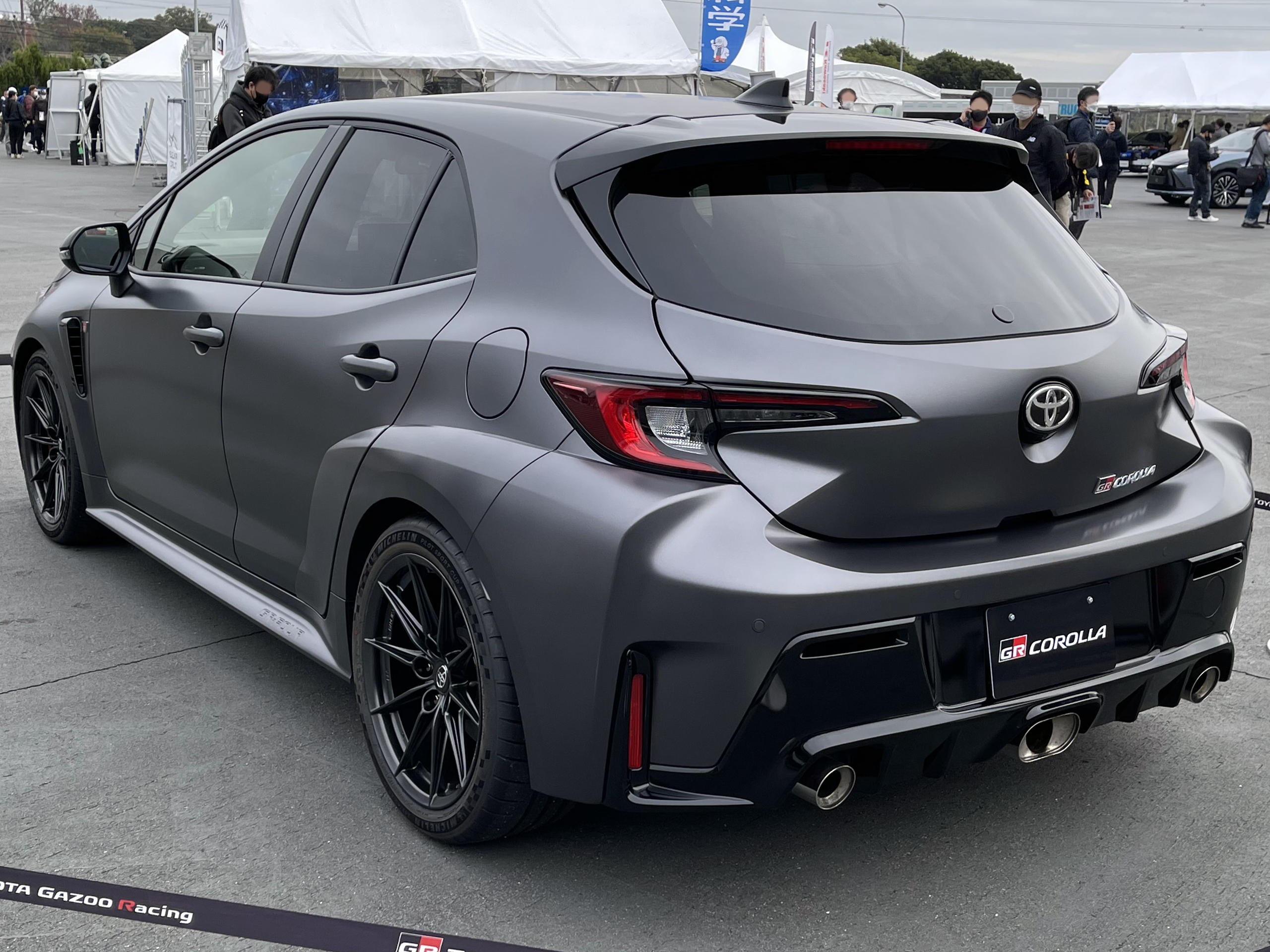
GR Corolla Morizo Edition (Japan)

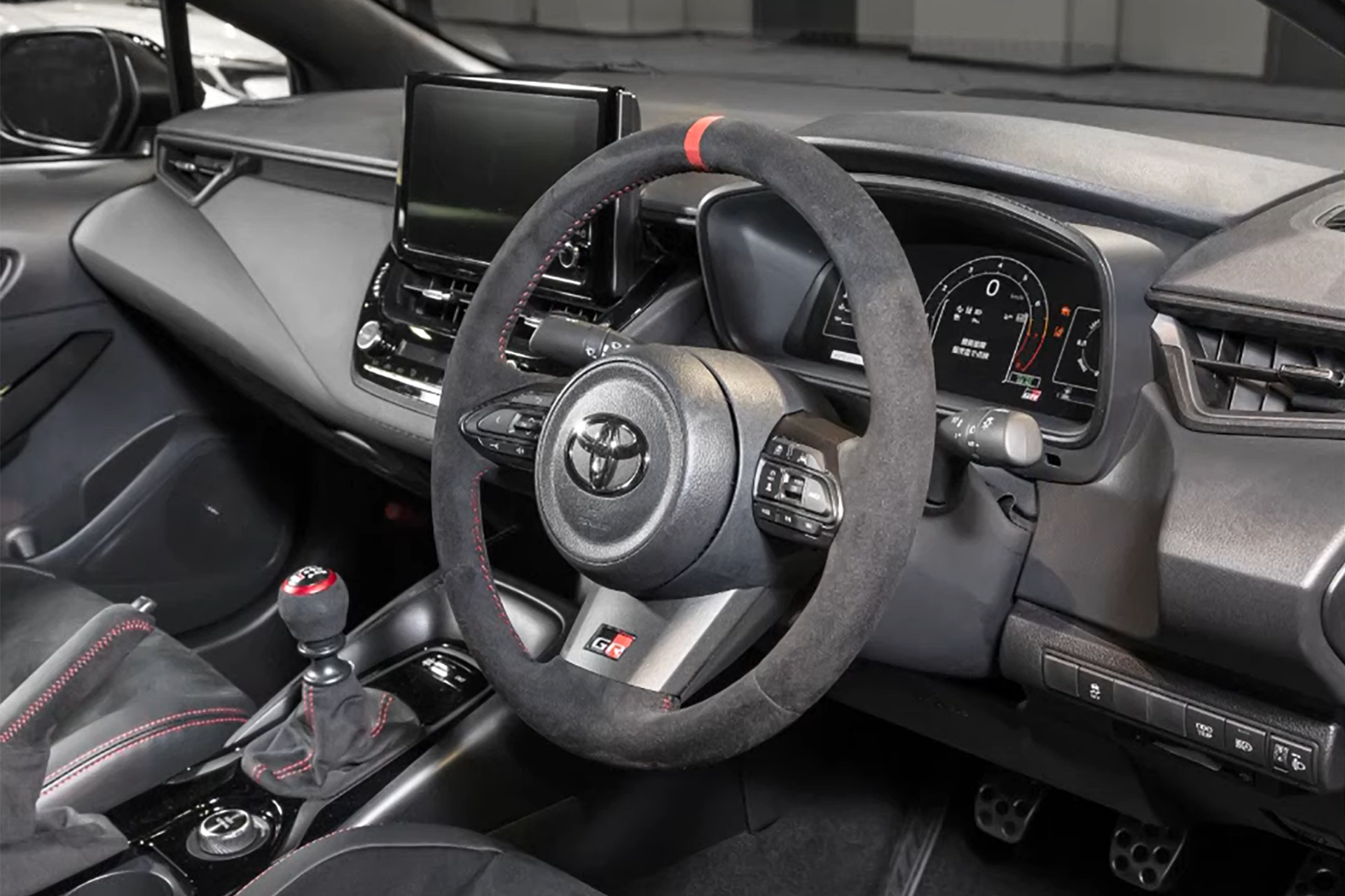
Interior (Morizo Edition)

The Morizo Edition (stylized "MORIZO") is a limited-production "track-ready" variant of the GR Corolla with reduced weight, increased performance figures, and enhanced handling, which is both available in Japan and North America.

The curb weight was reduced by approximately 45 kg (100 lb) from the Circuit Edition model to 1,445 kg (3,186 lb) by removing the rear seats, adding forged carbon fiber roof (also available on the Circuit Edition), removing the speakers and window regulators from the rear doors, and removing the rear wiper blade and motor. The engine torque output was increased by 30 N⋅m (22 lb⋅ft) to 400 N⋅m (295 lb⋅ft), while the horsepower figure remain unchanged. To improve handling, the suspension was re-tuned with monotube shock absorbers, 10 mm (0.4 in) wider tires on lighter rims were used, and body rigidity was increased with 349 additional spot welds, over an additional 6 m (19.7 ft) of structural adhesive, and body reinforcement braces. Engineers adjusted the transmission gear ratios, differential gear ratio and engine tuning to support sustained acceleration at peak torque on the Morizo Edition.

The special edition was named after "Morizo", the pseudonym used by Akio Toyoda when participating in races.

== Facelift ==
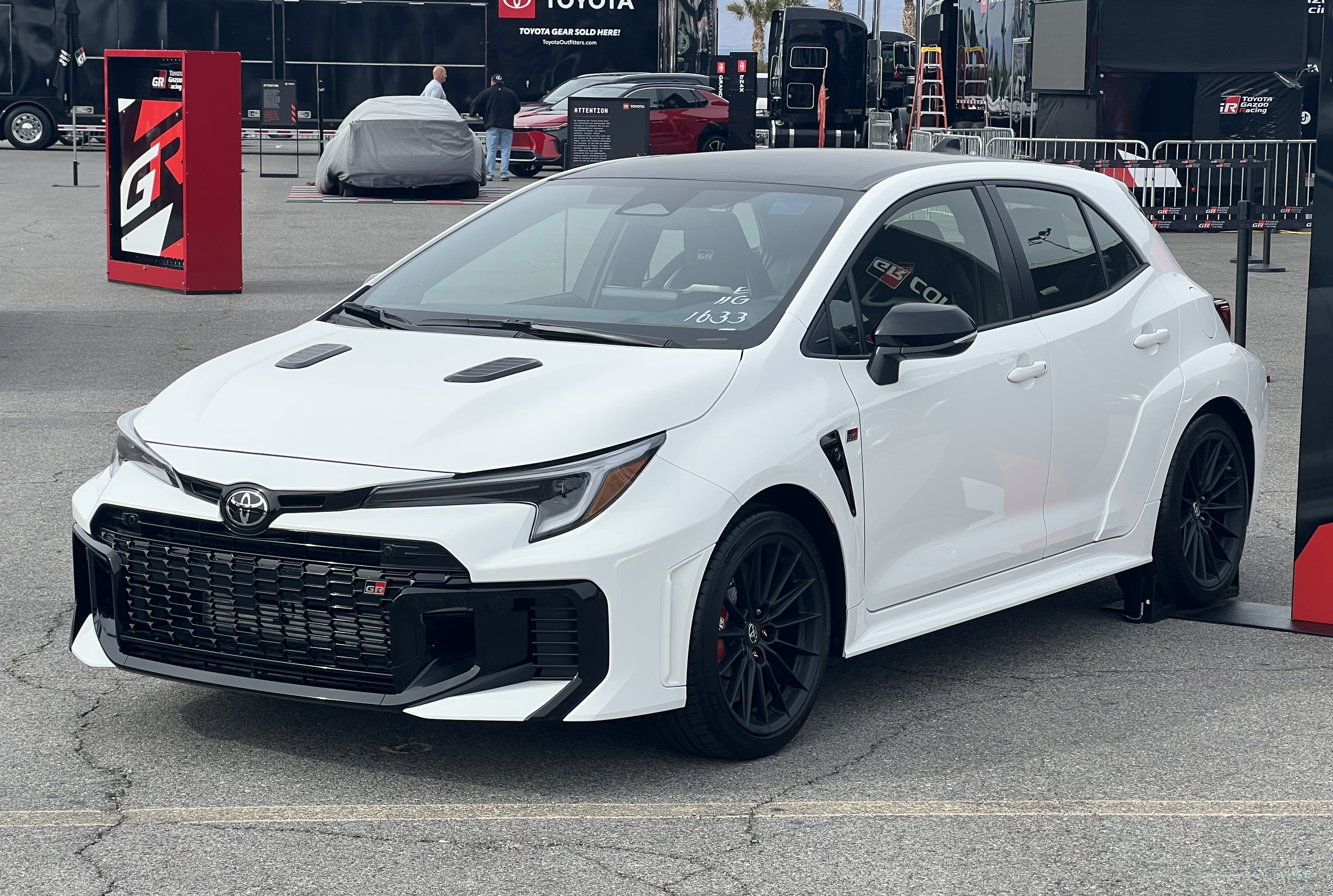

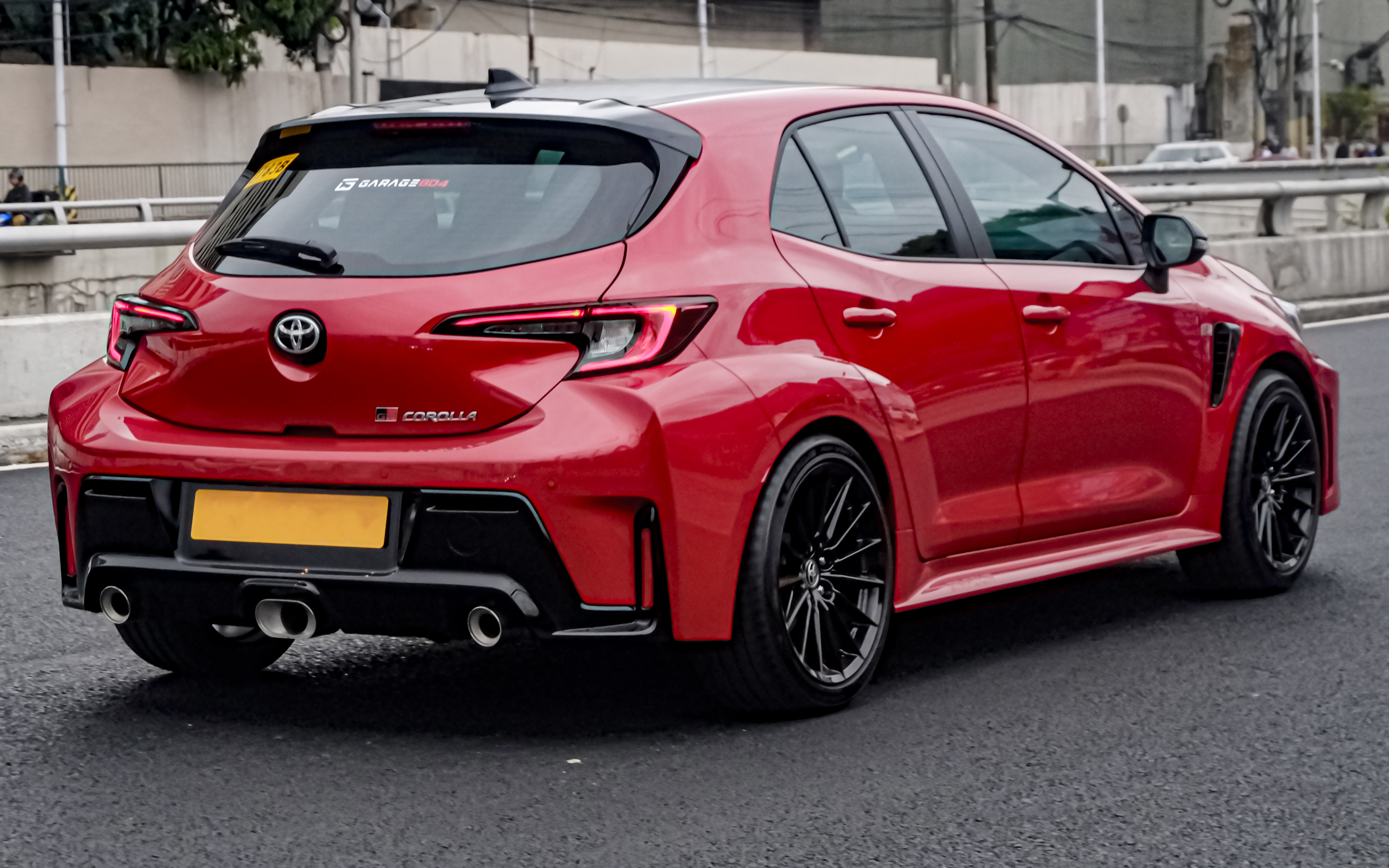
Toyota GR Corolla (facelift)

The facelifted GR Corolla was revealed on August 1, 2024, for the 2025 model year in North America. The GR 8-speed Direct Automatic Transmission (DAT) option became available including Formula One-style paddle-shifters for semi-automatic mode. The restyled front bumper was designed for better cooling and aerodynamics.

=== RZ ===
The GR Corolla RZ continued to become available for the Japanese Domestic Market. Optional Sport Package includes black semi-bucket front seats with GR logo, black Ultrasuede 3-spoke steering wheel with Toyota (T) logo on the center and GR emblem on the bottom spoke, black Ultrasuede shift knob with black boot with red stitching, black parking brake with red stitching, and red seatbelts. Other options are steering wheel heater, seat heater, drive recorder, and JBL Premium Sound System with Display Audio (Connected Navi) Plus.

=== Core, Premium & Premium Plus ===
The model grades for the US market are the Core, Premium, and Premium Plus. Behind the right-hand side of the bumper, a sub-radiator is standard on the Premium Plus, or optional on the Premium. While the left-hand side of the bumper houses the transmission fluid cooler for the 8-speed DAT. All trims now produce 400 N⋅m (295 ft⋅lb) of torque and come with front and rear torsen limited slip differentials standard. With hood bulge and vents, forged carbon roof, the US market Premium Plus is the successor of the Circuit Edition.

In Canada, the model grades are slightly different from the US. The manual only Core is still the base model. The upgrade model which is called Premium which is available with either manual or automatic gearbox. The Canadian Premium has the features that are on the US market Premium Plus such as the forged carbon roof, heads up display, bulged hood with vents, and sub-radiator.

For the South African market, the plain hood GR Corolla Core was discontinued. The upgraded model with hood vents continues to be called Circuit, and offered with manual and automatic gearbox.

The GR Corolla facelift was unveiled in the Middle East on February 16, 2026. It is offered in a higher grade similar to US Premium Plus with the choice of manual or automatic transmission.

=== GRMN Corolla ===
GRMN Corolla

In June 2026, The GRMN Corolla was unveiled. The GRMN Corolla is a "track-ready" variant of the GR Corolla with reduced weight, increased performance figures, and enhanced handling. It is featured with carbon fiber hood, front fenders, front side spoilers, and adjustable rear spoiler. A pre-production version of the GRMN Corolla was unveiled with a camouflage paint scheme at the Nürburgring. The 1.6-liter inline 3-cylinder G16E-GTS turbo engine retains the same maximum output but increases maximum torque by 15 N⋅m (11 lb⋅ft; 2 kg⋅m), reaching 415 N⋅m (306 lb⋅ft; 42 kg⋅m).

The GRMN Corolla will be produced in the limited quantities of 730 units worldwide. It will be available in Japan, North America, and Australia at least starting in 2027.

=== Morizo RR Edition ===
The GR Corolla Morizo RR is under development. It's a 5-seater with 8-speed DAT.

== Motorsport ==
=== GR Corolla TC ===
The GR Corolla TC at Indianapolis Motor Speedway.

The GR Corolla TC race car made its debut at the opening round of the 2025 TC America Series at Sonoma Raceway. The car retains the 1.6 L 3-cylinder turbo engine, 8-speed Direct Automatic Transmission (DAT) and GR-Four all-wheel drive system that is used in the road going version. Upgrades made were Alcon 6-piston front and 2-piston rear brakes, custom MacPherson struts, JRi dual-adjustable shocks, and various aerodynamic improvements. Multiple safety improvements were also made with the car now equipped with an FIA-approved roll cage, an OMP fiberglass seat with a six-point harness, and an OMP electronically activated fire extinguishing system.

=== GR Corolla RC2 ===
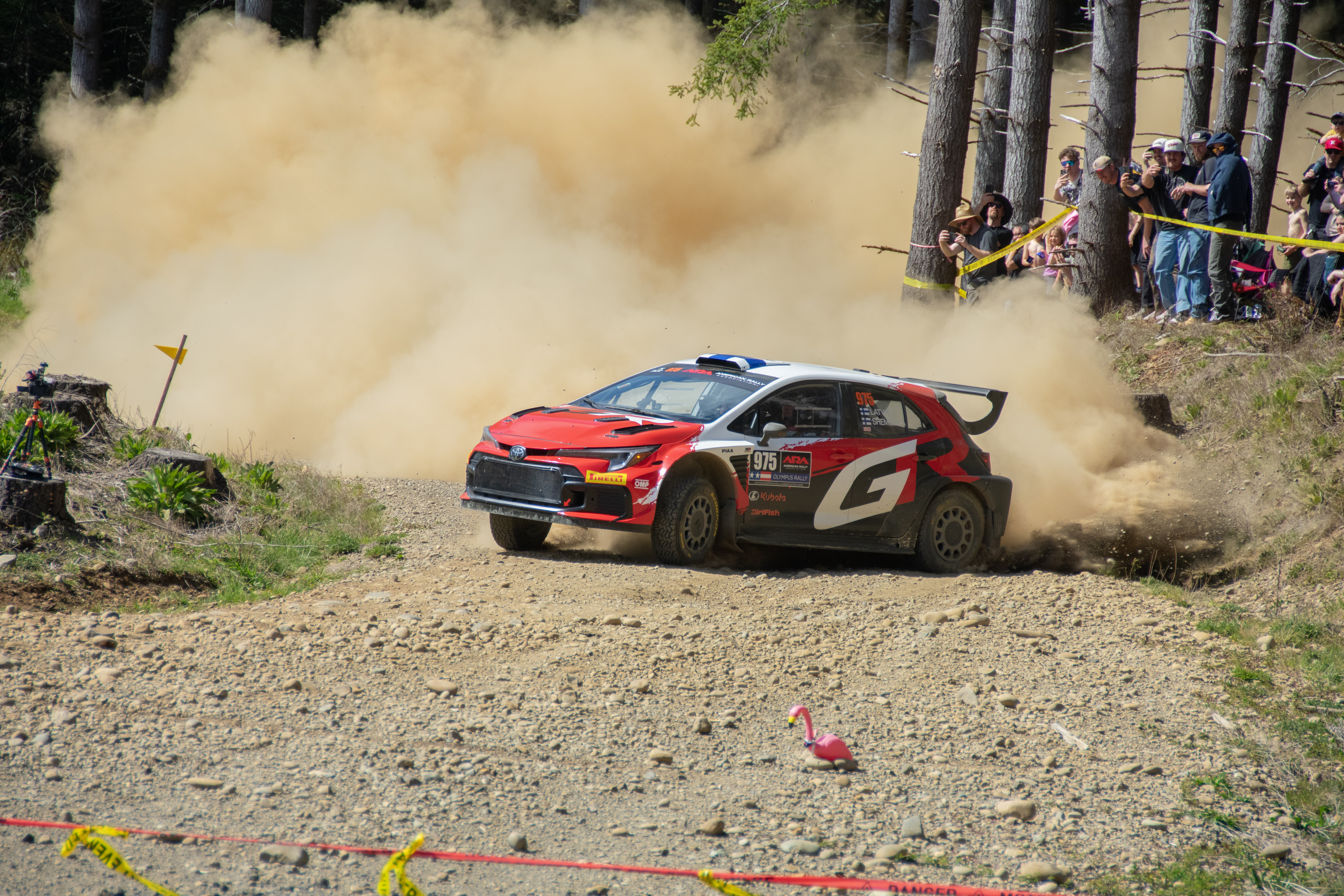
The GR Corolla RC2 at the 2026 Olympus Rally.

Development on a rallying version of the GR Corolla began following the 2025 Tokyo Auto Salon. Developed in conjunction with Rallysport Services, the GR Corolla RC2 features the same 1.6 L 3-cylinder turbo engine and Sadev 5-speed sequential transmission used in the GR Yaris Rally2. Toyota formally announced their commitment to the American Rally Association National Championship on December 19, 2025. The car made its debut at the 2026 100 Acre Wood Rally, where it would fail to finish due to mechanical problems and a crash. The car scored its first victory at the 2026 Olympus Rally driven by Jari-Matti Latvala. Seth Quintero has subsequently taken three victories with the car.

=== GR Corolla H2 Concept ===
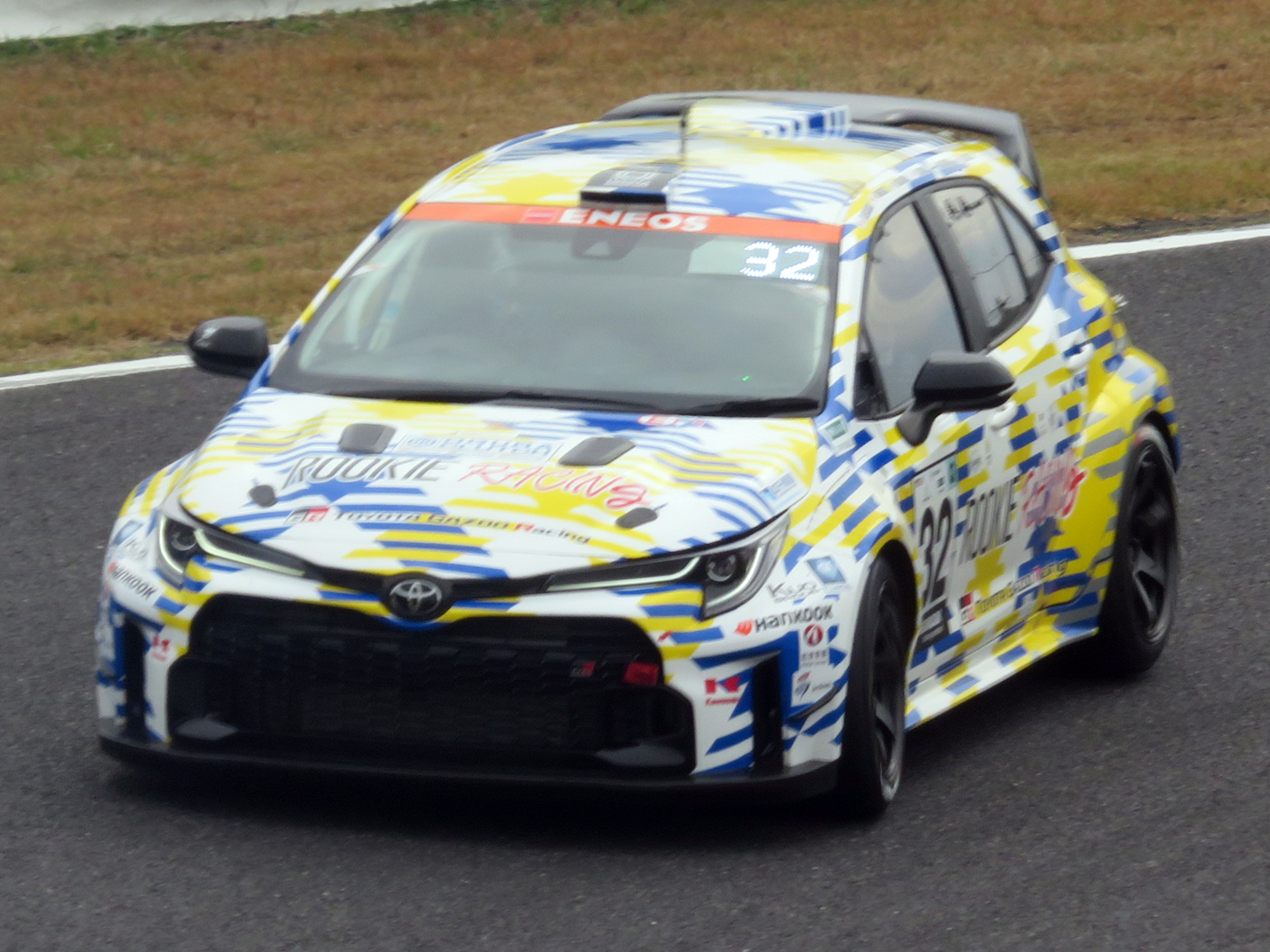
The GR Corolla H2 Concept at the 2022 Suzuka 5 Hours Endurance Race

On April 22, 2021, Toyota announced plans to enter hydrogen-powered race cars in the Super Taikyu Series with Rookie Racing. After campaigning a Corolla Sport throughout the 2021 season and the beginning of 2022, Rookie Racing would debut the gaseous hydrogen-powered GR Corolla H2 concept at the 2022 SUGO Super Taikyu 3 Hours Race racing in the ST-Q class. Following the remainder of the season, Toyota further developed the car for 2023, this time switching to liquid hydrogen propulsion, the first of its kind in motorsport. The new H2 Concept was scheduled to debut at the 2023 Suzuka Super Taikyu 5 Hours race, but a fire in testing forced the team's withdrawal. It would ultimately make its debut at the 2023 NAPAC Fuji SUPER TEC 24 Hours Race and has since made sporadic appearances in the Super Taikyu Series.
