= Jason Hart (racing driver) =

American racing driver (born 1976)

- Hart in 2022
- Nationality: (United States) American
- Born: 20 February 1976 (age 50) Flower Mound, Texas, U.S.
- Categorisation: FIA Silver

Championship titles
- 2025 2024 2021-2023: Lamborghini Super Trofeo North America – Pro-Am; 24H Series – GT3 Am; GT4 America Series – Pro-Am

Jason Hart (born February 20, 1976) is an American racing driver who last competed in the GT World Challenge Europe Endurance Cup for 2 Seas Motorsport and the GTD Pro class of the IMSA SportsCar Championship for Winward Racing.

== Career ==
Hart made his racing debut in 2006 at the 25 Hours of Thunderhill for PDQ Motorsports, winning the race in the E2 class. After acting primarily as a driver coach for the next three years, Hart joined RSR Motorsports in 2011 to race in the Continental Tire Sports Car Challenge for the next two seasons. During 2012, Hart also made his debut in the Rolex Sports Car Series for Horton Autosport in the GT class at Lime Rock Park in the team's Porsche 911 GT3 Cup.

The following year, Hart joined fellow Porsche customer team Park Place Motorsports to compete in select rounds of the Rolex Sports Car Series, before returning to the team in 2014 to race in the 24 Hours of Daytona in the GTD class of the newly-renamed United SportsCar Championship. Hart then primarily returned to his duties as a driver coach for 2015, but made a one-off return to racing at that year's Lone Star Le Mans for Audi-fielding Flying Lizard Motorsports in GTD.

After not racing in 2016, Hart joined Porsche-fielding Nolasport to compete in select rounds of the SprintX GT Championship Series the following year, finishing runner-up in GTS Am with two class wins to his name. Part-time campaigns in the SprintX GT Championship Series and the Continental Tire SportsCar Challenge in GT4 machinery then ensued the following year, in which he primarily raced with Classic BMW, taking a best result of fourth in the latter at Daytona. At the end of 2018, Hart won the 24 Hours of COTA with the same team in the GT4 class.

Returning to Nolasport for 2019, Hart raced with Matt Travis in the SprintX series of GT4 America in Pro-Am. In his first year in the series, Hart began with five wins in a row, before taking further wins at Portland and Road America en route to runner-up honors in Pro-Am. Staying with the team for the 2020 season, Hart won both races at Circuit of the Americas, race three at VIR and race one at Sonoma, as well as taking three podiums to end the year runner-up in Pro-Am. Continuing for a third consecutive campaign in 2021, Hart started the season with five wins in a row, four of them being overall, before ending the year with four consecutive class wins as he clinched his first Pro-Am title. Towards the end of the year, Hart also raced with the same team at the 24 Hours of Sebring, winning it in the GT4 class alongside Zac Anderson, Alex Mayer, Scott Noble and Travis.

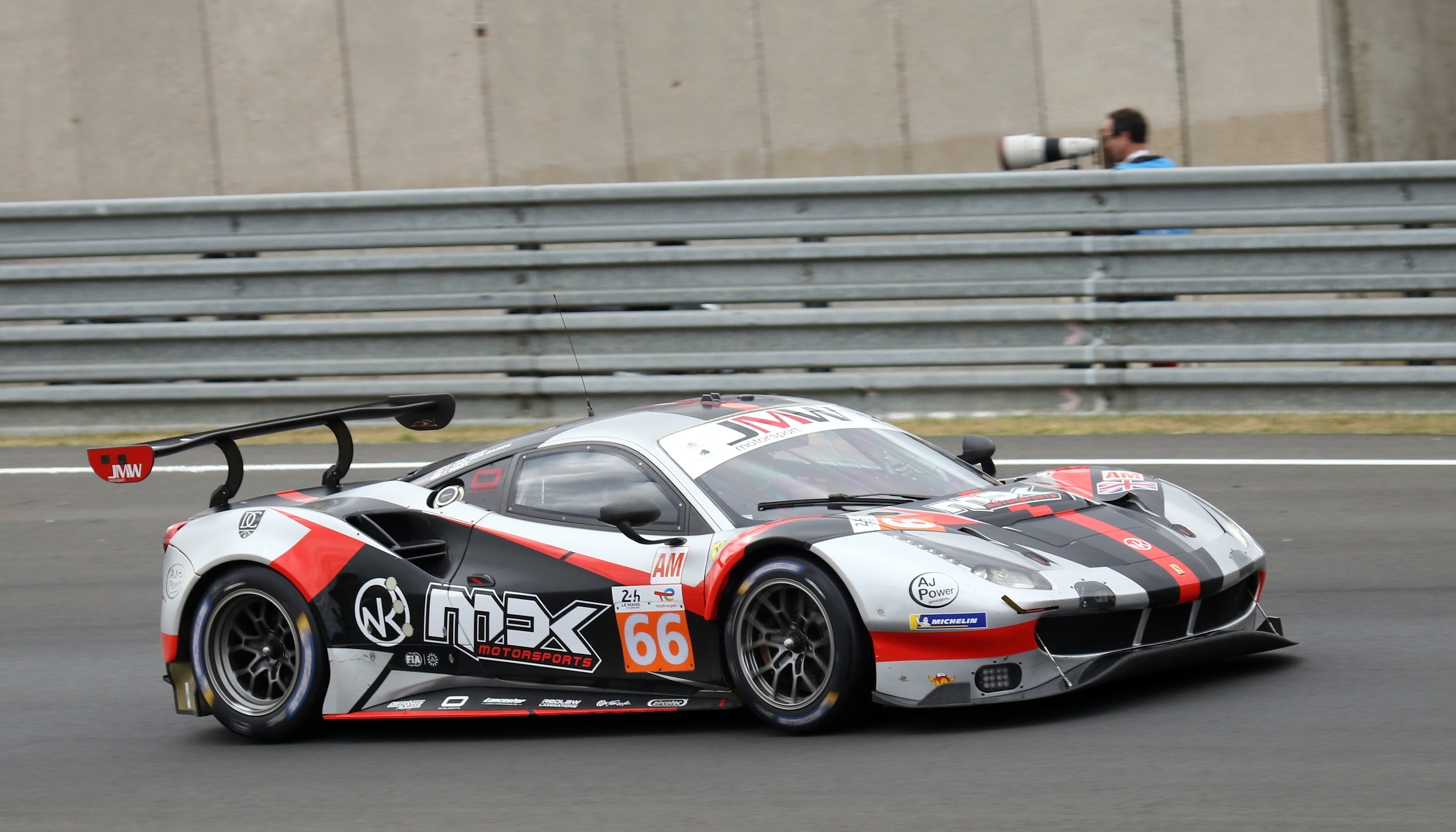
Hart's MDK-branded JMW Motorsport Ferrari at the 2022 24 Hours of Le Mans.

The following year, Hart remained with Nolasport for a dual campaign in GT4 America, with Noble, and the GS class of the Michelin Pilot Challenge, with Travis. Between the two campaigns, Hart found more success in the former, scoring two class wins and four more podiums en route to his second consecutive Pro-Am title. During 2022, Hart also made his 24 Hours of Le Mans debut for JMW Motorsport in LMGTE Am, sharing a Ferrari 488 GTE Evo with Mark Kvamme and Renger van der Zande. In 2023, Hart reunited with Matt Travis for another season of GT4 America, scoring an overall win at Sonoma and a class one at Sebring, as he clinched his third Pro-Am title by one point after taking six other podiums. In parallel, Hart also raced in Porsche Carrera Cup North America for MDK Motorsports, finishing fifth in the overall standings with a win at Watkins Glen. During 2023, Hart also raced at the 24 Hours of Daytona in GTD Pro for the same team, as a last-minute substitute for an injured Kevin Magnussen.

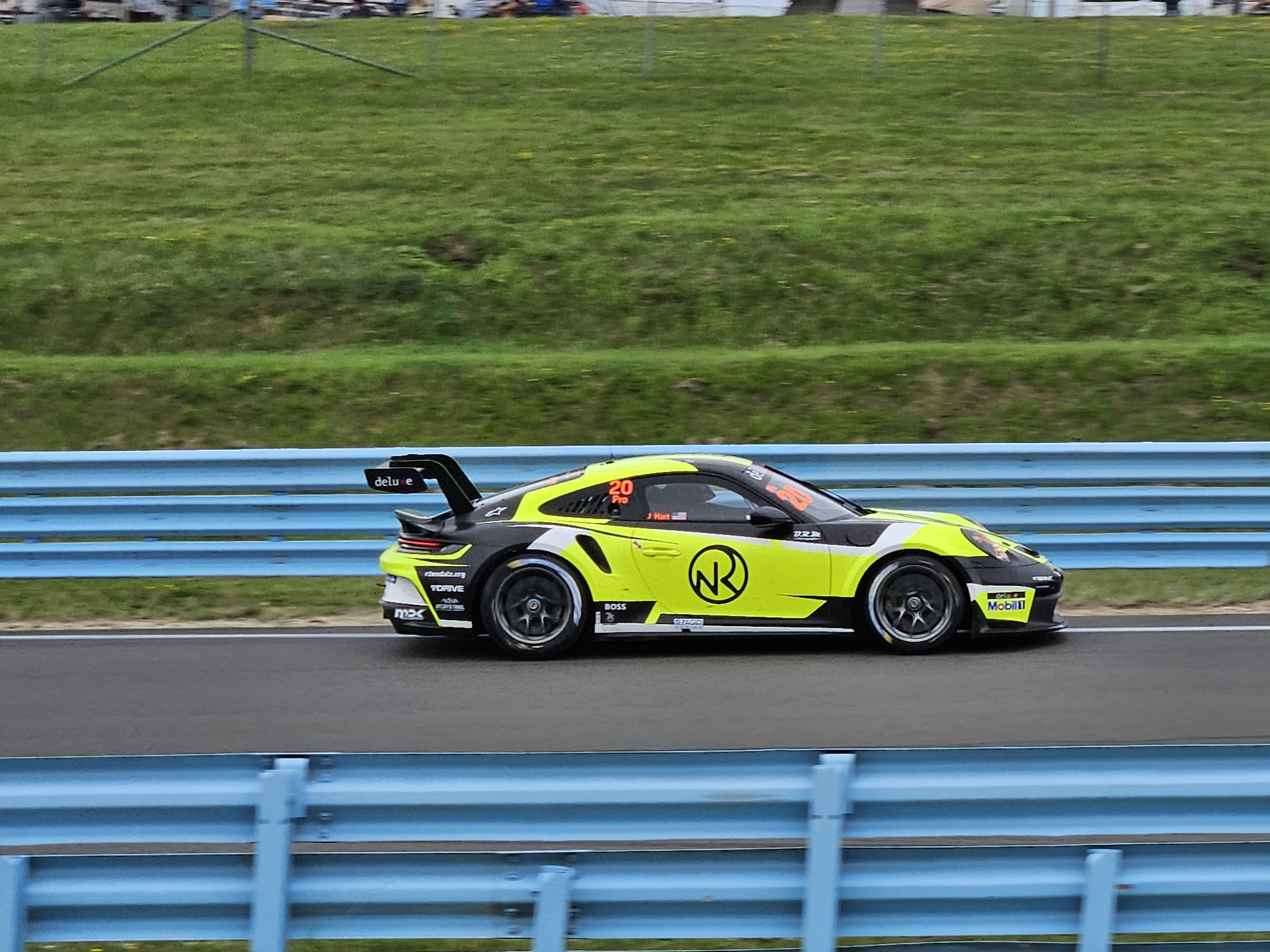
Hart racing in Porsche Carrera Cup North America at Watkins Glen in 2023.

Continuing with Porsche machinery for 2024, Hart joined Herberth Motorsport to race in the 24H Series alongside Ralf Bohn and Scott Noble in GT3 Am. In his first full season in the series, Hart won the 24 Hours of Barcelona overall, as well as the 12 Hours of Mugello and the 24 Hours of Portimão in class, en route to the GT3 Am title. During 2024, Hart also made his European Le Mans Series debut, racing in the final two rounds for JMW Motorsport in the LMGT3 class alongside Noble and Ben Tuck. Hart then joined TR3 Racing to race in the following year's Lamborghini Super Trofeo North America season, winning race two at Road America and both races at Misano to secure the Pro-Am title on countback. In parallel, Hart also raced full-time in the European Le Mans Series for JMW Motorsport alongside Noble and Gianmaria Bruni, as well as making a one-off appearance in the IMSA SportsCar Championship for Ferrari-linked Triarsi Competizione in GTD.

In 2026, Hart joined Mercedes-linked Winward Racing and GetSpeed Team Noble Racing to race in the GTD Pro class of the IMSA SportsCar Championship and a one-off cameo in the Bronze Cup of the GT World Challenge Europe Endurance Cup, respectively. The season began with a landmark third-place finish at the 24 Hours of Daytona, as both GTD Pro teams containing bronze-rated drivers—75 Express and Winward—made the podium. Following that, Hart made a cameo in International GT Open and also raced at the 24 Hours of Spa for 2 Seas Motorsport.

== Racing record ==
=== Racing career summary ===
Season	Series	Team	Races	Wins	Poles	F/Laps	Podiums	Points	Position
2006	NASA 25 Hours of Thunderhill – E2	PDQ Motorsports	1	1	0	0	1	—N/a	**1st**
2007	ASCS Gulf South Regional Series							110	61st
2008	American Bank of Oklahoma ASCS Sooner Region Series							199	71st
2011	Continental Tire Sports Car Challenge – ST	RSR Motorsports	9	0	0	0	0	141	20th
2012	Continental Tire Sports Car Challenge – ST	RSR Motorsports	9	0	0	0	0	96	30th
2012	Rolex Sports Car Series – GT	Horton Autosport	1	0	0	0	0	18	66th
2013	Rolex Sports Car Series – GT	Park Place Motorsports	4	0	0	0	0	78	22nd
2014	United SportsCar Championship – GTD	Park Place Motorsports	1	0	0	0	0	1	131st
2015	United SportsCar Championship – GTD	Flying Lizard Motorsports	1	0	0	0	0	21	51st
2017	SprintX GT Championship Series – GTS Am	Nolasport	4	2	2	2	4	94	**2nd**
2017	Trans-Am Series – TA2	Speedlogix	1	0	0	0	1	33	34th
2017	24H Series Continents – CUP1	Classic BMW	1	1	0	0	1	0	NC
2018	SprintX GT Championship Series – GTS Pro-Am	Classic BMW	4	0	0	0	0	52	18th
2018	SprintX GT Championship Series – GTS Pro-Am	Nolasport	2	0	0	0	2	52	18th
2018	Continental Tire SportsCar Challenge – GS	Classic BMW	4	0	0	0	0	84	30th
2018	Continental Tire SportsCar Challenge – GS	RS1	1	0	0	0	0	84	30th
2018	24H GT Series Continents – GT4	Classic BMW	1	1	0	0	1	44	NC
2019	Michelin Pilot Challenge – GS	Nolasport	2	0	0	0	0	28	59th
2019	GT4 America SprintX – Pro-Am	Nolasport	16	7	11	6	13	302	**2nd**
2019	24H GT Series Continents – GT4	Sorg Rennsport	1	0	0	0	0	26	NC
2020	GT4 America SprintX – Pro-Am	Nolasport	15	4	3	2	7	230	**2nd**
2021	GT4 America Series – Pro-Am	Nolasport	13	9	6	0	10	267	**1st**
2021	Trans Am Series – XGT	GSpeed	1	0	0	0	1	19	4th
2021	Indianapolis 8 Hours – GT4 Pro-Am	Nolasport	1	0	0	0	0	—N/a	5th
2021	24H GT Series – GT4	Nolasport	1	1	0	0	1	29	NC
2022	Michelin Pilot Challenge – GS	Nolasport	7	0	0	0	0	1000	31st
2022	GT4 America Series – Pro-Am	Nolasport	14	2	1	0	6	191	**1st**
2022	Trans Am Series – XGT	GSpeed	1	0	0	0	0	16	6th
2022	24 Hours of Le Mans – LMGTE Am	JMW Motorsport	1	0	0	0	0	—N/a	15th
2022–23	Middle East Trophy – GT3 Pro-Am	Herberth Motorsport	1	0	0	0	1	36	NC
2023	IMSA SportsCar Championship – GTD Pro	MDK Motorsports	1	0	0	0	0	250	26th
2023	GT4 America Series – Pro-Am	Nolasport	14	2	0	0	8	190	**1st**
2023	Porsche Carrera Cup North America	MDK Motorsports	15	1	0	0	3	141	5th
2023–24	Middle East Trophy – GT3 Am	Huber Motorsport	1	0	0	0	0	28	NC
2024	24H Series – GT3 Am	Herberth Motorsport	5	3	2	3	3	188	**1st**
2024	Michelin Pilot Challenge – GS	Nolasport	1	0	0	0	0	320	52nd
2024	GT4 European Series – Pro-Am	Nolasport	2	0	0	0	0	6	25th
2024	Le Mans Cup – GT3	Herberth Motorsport	1	0	0	0	0	0	NC†
2024	European Le Mans Series – LMGT3	JMW Motorsport	2	0	0	0	0	9	15th
2024	GT4 America Series – Pro-Am	Nolasport	2	0	0	0	0	0	NC†
2025	Lamborghini Super Trofeo North America – Pro-Am	TR3 Racing	12	3	?	?	6	113	**1st**
2025	European Le Mans Series – LMGT3	JMW Motorsport	6	0	0	0	0	11	18th
2025	IMSA SportsCar Championship – GTD	Triarsi Competizione	1	0	0	0	0	207	75th
2025	GT4 European Series – Pro-Am	Nolasport	2	0	0	0	0	8	19th
2026	IMSA SportsCar Championship – GTD Pro	Winward Racing	2	0	0	0	1	512	29th
2026	GT World Challenge Europe Endurance Cup	GetSpeed Team Noble Racing	1	0	0	0	0	0	NC
2026	GT World Challenge Europe Endurance Cup	2 Seas Motorsport	1	0	0	0	0	0	NC
2026	GT World Challenge Europe Endurance Cup – Bronze	GetSpeed Team Noble Racing	1	0	0	0	0	4	35th
2026	GT World Challenge Europe Endurance Cup – Bronze	2 Seas Motorsport	1	0	0	0	0	4	35th
2026	International GT Open	2 Seas Motorsport	1	0	0	0	0	0	73rd
2026	International GT Open – Am	2 Seas Motorsport	1	0	1	0	0	0	22nd
2026	Intercontinental GT Challenge	2 Seas Motorsport	1	0	0	0	0	0	NC

^{†} As Hart was a guest driver, he was ineligible to score points.

=== Complete Michelin Pilot Challenge results ===
(key) (Races in bold indicate pole position) (Races in italics indicate fastest lap)

Year	Entrant	Class	Make	1	2	3	4	5	6	7	8	9	10	Rank	Points
2011	RSR Motorsports	Street Tuner	Mini Cooper S	DAY; 7	HMS; 16	BAR; 28	VIR; 6	LIM; 14	WGL; 32	ELK; 7	LGA; 9	NJMP; 20	MOH	20th	141
2012	RSR Motorsports	Street Tuner	Mini Cooper S	DAY; 16	BAR; 33	HMS; 23								30th	96
2012	RSR Motorsports	Street Tuner	Honda Civic Si				NJMP; 12	MOH; 28	ELK; 32	WGL	IMS; 6	LGA; 12	LIM; 24	30th	96
2018	Classic BMW	Grand Sport	BMW M4 GT4	DAY; 4	SEB; 25	MOH	WGL; 24	MOS	LIM	ELK	VIR; 11	LGA		30th	84
2018	Nolasport	Grand Sport	Porsche Cayman GT4 RS Clubsport										ATL; 12	30th	84
2019	Nolasport	Grand Sport	Porsche 718 Cayman GT4 RS Clubsport	DAY; 8	SEB; 26	MOH	WGL	MOS	LIM	ELK	VIR	LGA	ATL	59th	28
2022	Nolasport	Grand Sport	Porsche 718 Cayman GT4 RS Clubsport	DAY; 19	SEB; 24	LGA; 5	MOH	WGL; DNS	MOS	LIM; 22†	ELK; 26	VIR; 7	ATL; 14	31st	1000
2024	Nolasport	Grand Sport	Porsche 718 Cayman GT4 RS Clubsport	DAY	SEB; 8	LGA	MOH	WGL	MOS	ELK	VIR	IMS	ATL	52nd	230

=== Complete Grand-Am Rolex Sports Car Series results ===
(key) (Races in bold indicate pole position; results in italics indicate fastest lap)

Year	Team	Class	Make	Engine	1	2	3	4	5	6	7	8	9	10	11	12	13	Rank	Points	Ref
2012	Horton Autosport	GT	Porsche 911 GT3 Cup	Porsche 4.0L F6	DAY	BAR	MIA	NJMP	BEL	MOH	ELK	WGL	IMS	WGL	CGV	LAG	LIM; 13	66th	18	
2013	Park Place Motorsports	GT	Porsche 911 GT3 Cup	Porsche 4.0L F6	DAY; 16	COA; 12	BAR	ATL; 10	BEL	MOH	WGL	IMS; 9	ELK	KNS	LAG	LIM		22nd	78	

=== Complete IMSA SportsCar Championship results ===
(key) (Races in bold indicate pole position) (Races in italics indicate fastest lap)

Year	Entrant	Class	Make	Engine	1	2	3	4	5	6	7	8	9	10	11	Pos.	Points	Ref
2014	Park Place Motorsports	GTD	Porsche 911 GT America	Porsche 4.0L Flat-6	DAY; 13	SEB	LGA	DET	WGL	MOS	IND	ELK	VIR	COA	PET	131st	1	
2015	Flying Lizard Motorsports	GTD	Audi R8 LMS ultra	Audi DAR 5.2 L V10	DAY	SEB	LGA	DET	WGL	LIM	ELK	VIR	AUS; 11	PET		51st	21	
2023	MDK Motorsports	GTD Pro	Porsche 911 GT3 R (992)	Porsche 4.2 L Flat-6	DAY; 6	SEB	LBH	LGA	WGL	MOS	LIM	ELK	VIR	IMS	PET	26th	250	
2025	Triarsi Competizione	GTD	Ferrari 296 GT3	Ferrari 3.0 L Turbo V6	DAY	SEB	LBH	LGA	WGL; 12	MOS	ELK	VIR	IMS	PET		75th	207	
2026	Winward Racing	GTD Pro	Mercedes-AMG GT3 Evo	Mercedes-AMG M159 6.2 L V8	DAY; 3	SEB; 12	LGA	DET	WGL	MOS	ELK	VIR	IMS	PET		29th	512	

=== Complete 24 Hours of Le Mans results ===
Year	Team	Co-Drivers	Car	Class	Laps	Pos.	Class Pos.
2022	(United Kingdom) JMW Motorsport	(United States) Mark Kvamme (Netherlands) Renger van der Zande	Ferrari 488 GTE Evo	LMGTE Am	331	50th	15th

=== Complete Porsche Carrera Cup North America results ===
(key) (Races in bold indicate pole position) (Races in italics indicate fastest lap)

Year	Team	Class	1	2	3	4	5	6	7	8	9	10	11	12	13	14	15	16	Pos	Points
2023	MDK Motorsports	Pro	SEB; 1; 4	SEB; 2; 3	LBH; 1; 30	LBH; 2 DNS	MIA; 1; 18	MIA; 2; 7	WGL; 1; 1	WGL; 2; 3	ROA; 1; 9	ROA; 2; 5	IMS; 1; 9	IMS; 2; 24	LGA; 1; 4	LGA; 2; 15	COA; 1; 10	COA; 2; 5	5th	141

=== Complete GT4 European Series results ===
(key) (Races in bold indicate pole position) (Races in italics indicate fastest lap)

Year	Team	Car	Class	1	2	3	4	5	6	7	8	9	10	11	12	Pos	Points
2024	Nolasport	Porsche 718 Cayman GT4 RS Clubsport	Pro-Am	LEC; 1	LEC; 2	MIS; 1	MIS; 2	SPA; 1; 38	SPA; 2; 20	HOC; 1	HOC; 2	MNZ; 1	MNZ; 2	JED; 1	JED; 2	25th	6
2025	Nolasport	Porsche 718 Cayman GT4 RS Clubsport	Pro-Am	LEC; 1	LEC; 2	ZAN; 1	ZAN; 2	SPA; 1; 29	SPA; 2; 18	MIS; 1	MIS; 2	NÜR; 1	NÜR; 2	CAT; 1	CAT; 2	19th	8

=== Complete European Le Mans Series results ===
(key) (Races in bold indicate pole position; races in italics indicate fastest lap)

Year	Entrant	Class	Chassis	Engine	1	2	3	4	5	6	Pos.	Points
2024	JMW Motorsport	LMGT3	Ferrari 296 GT3	Ferrari F163 3.0 L Turbo V6	CAT	LEC	IMO	SPA	MUG; 6	ALG; 10	15th	9
2025	JMW Motorsport	LMGT3	Ferrari 296 GT3	Ferrari F163CE 3.0 L Turbo V6	CAT; 12	LEC; 10	IMO; 6	SPA; 11	SIL; 9	ALG; 11	18th	11

=== Complete GT World Challenge Europe results ===
==== GT World Challenge Europe Endurance Cup ====
(key) (Races in bold indicate pole position) (Races in italics indicate fastest lap)

Year	Team	Car	Class	1	2	3	4	5	6	7	Pos.	Points
2026	GetSpeed Team Noble Racing	Mercedes-AMG GT3 Evo	Bronze	LEC; 46	MNZ						35th	4
2026	2 Seas Motorsport	Mercedes-AMG GT3 Evo	Bronze			SPA; 6H; 61	SPA; 12H; 53	SPA; 24H; 44	NÜR	ALG	35th	4
