= 2023 Porsche Carrera Cup North America =

Motor racing competition

The 2023 Porsche Carrera Cup North America, known as the 2023 Porsche Deluxe Carrera Cup North America for sponsorship reasons, was the third season of the Porsche Carrera Cup North America. It began on March 15 at Sebring International Raceway and ended on October 22 at Circuit of the Americas.

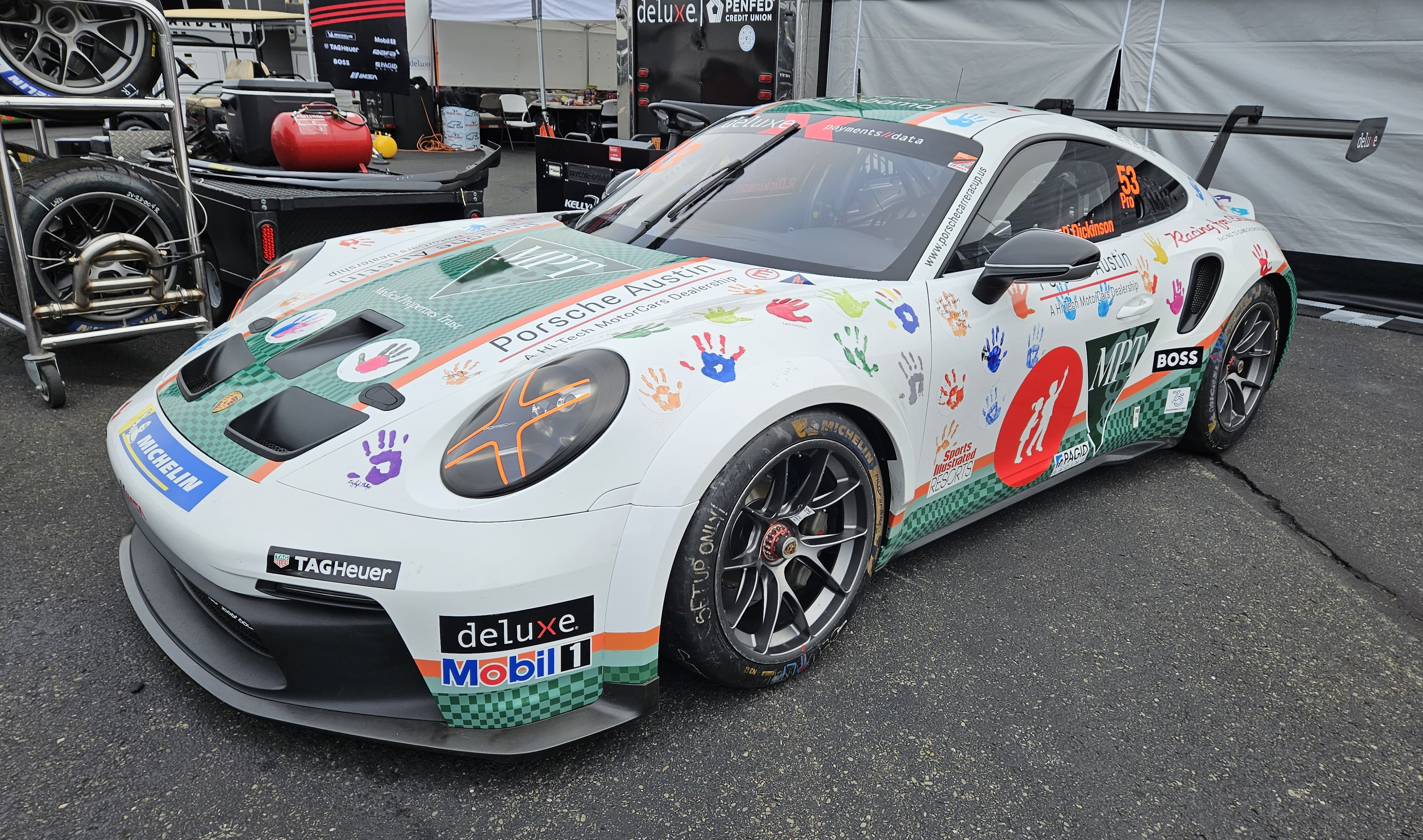
Riley Dickinson and Kellymoss took the Drivers' and Teams' championships titles

== Calendar ==
The calendar was released on February 8, 2023, featuring eight rounds.

Round	Circuit	Date
1	Sebring International Raceway, Sebring, Florida	March 15–16
2	Long Beach Street Circuit, Long Beach, California	April 14–16
3	Miami International Autodrome, Miami Gardens, Florida	May 5–7
4	(New York (state)) Watkins Glen International, Watkins Glen, New York	June 22–25
5	Road America, Elkhart Lake, Wisconsin	July 27–29
6	Indianapolis Motor Speedway, Speedway, Indiana	September 15–17
7	WeatherTech Raceway Laguna Seca, Monterey, California	September 28 – October 1
8	Circuit of the Americas, Austin, Texas	October 20–22

== Entry list ==
Team	No.	Driver	Rounds
Pro Class
(United States) Kellymoss	2	(United States) Sean Varwig	All
(United States) Kellymoss	7	(United States) Michael McCarthy	All
(United States) Kellymoss	37	(United States) Sabré Cook	1–6
(United States) Kellymoss	53	(United States) Riley Dickinson	All
(United States) Kellymoss	99	(United States) Francis Selldorff	8
(United States) MDK Motorsports	3	(United States) Nick Boulle	7–8
(United States) MDK Motorsports	20	(United States) Jason Hart	All
(United States) MDK Motorsports	74	(Dominican Republic) Jimmy Llibre	All
(United States) MDK Motorsports	93	(Canada) Stefan Rzadzinski	All
(United States) JDX Racing	4	(United States) Elias De La Torre IV	All
(United States) JDX Racing	9	(United Kingdom) Will Martin	All
(United States) PT Autosport with JDX Racing	98	(United Kingdom) Alex Sedgwick	All
(United States) McCann Racing	8	(United States) Michael McCann	All
(United States) GMG Racing	11	(United States) Blake McDonald	8
(United States) Wright Motorsports	13	(United States) Varun Choksey	All
(United States) Wright Motorsports	15	(Canada) Nicky Hays	7
(Australia) McElrea Racing	17	(Australia) Tom Sargent	All
(Australia) McElrea Racing	24	(Canada) Thomas Nepveu	1–4
(Australia) McElrea Racing	24	(Australia) Bayley Hall	7–8
(United States) Accelerating Performance	33	(Netherlands) Kay van Berlo	3
(United States) Accelerating Performance	33	(United States) Michael Cooper	4–5, 7–8
(United States) Nolasport	47	(United States) Thomas Merrill	1–3, 5–8
(United States) Nolasport-Reis Nichols	64	(United Kingdom) Dan Clarke	All
(United States) 762 Motorsports	58	(United States) T.J. Fischer	1
(United States) 762 Motorsports	58	(United States) Nick Boulle	4
(United States) Topp Racing	77	(United States) Travis Wiley	All
(United States) Topp Racing	78	(New Zealand) Ryan Yardley	All
(United States) ACI Motorsports	81	(United States) Grant Talkie	1–3
(United States) Rearden Racing	85	(United States) Jake Pedersen	1–2, 4–8
(United States) Irish Mike's Racing	95	(United States) Conor Flynn	1, 3
Pro-Am Class
(United States) GMG Racing	11	(United States) Blake McDonald	7
(United States) GMG Racing	14	(United States) James Sofronas	8
(United States) GMG Racing	32	(United States) Kyle Washington	2–3, 5–8
(United States) GMG Racing	89	(United States) Todd Parriott	2–3, 5, 8
(United States) Kellymoss	23	(United States) P. J. Hyett	2, 4–5, 7–8
(United States) Kellymoss	65	(Dominican Republic) Efrin Castro	All
(United States) Kellymoss	89	(United States) Todd Parriott	7
(United States) Kellymoss	99	(United States) Alan Metni	1–2, 4, 6
(United States) McCann Racing	27	(United States) Christian Cole	1–4
(United States) MDK Motorsports	42	(United States) Don Yount	3
(United States) MDK Motorsports	68	(United States) Chris Bellomo	All
(United States) Accelerating Performance	44	Moisey Uretsky (Note: Moisey Uretsky is Russian, but he competes as a neutral competitor as Russian national emblems were banned by the FIA due to the Russian invasion of Ukraine.)	1–5, 7–8
(United States) Nolasport	46	(United States) Kayden Kelly	8
(United States) Goldcrest Motorsports	55	(United States) Matt Halcome	1
(United States) Topp Racing	56	(United States) Jeff Mosing	1–5
(United States) BGB Motorsports	69	(United States) Thomas Collingwood	3, 7–8
(United States) ACI Motorsports	82	(Canada) Marco Cirone	1–6
Am Class
(United States) MDK Motorsports	10	(United States) Scott Noble	All
(United States) MDK Motorsports	43	(United States) Mark Kvamme	All
(United States) Kellymoss	19	(United States) Tom Balames	1, 3, 5, 7
(United States) Goldcrest Motorsports	21	(United States) Grady Willingham	1, 3–8
(United States) Goldcrest Motorsports	28	(United States) Bob Mueller	1, 3, 7
(United States) Goldcrest Motorsports	29	(United States) Jeffrey Majkrzak	1
(United States) Goldcrest Motorsports	72	(United States) Phillip Martien	1, 3–4, 8
(United States) Goldcrest Motorsports	80	(United States) Joe Still	1
(United States) Wright Motorsports	57	(United States) John Goetz	All
(United States) McCann Racing	63	(United States) Michael Merritt	1–5, 7–8
(United States) McCann Racing	83	(United States) James McCann	All

== Results ==
Round	Circuit	Date	Pole position	Fastest lap	Winning driver	Winning team	Winning Pro-Am	Winning Am
1	Sebring International Raceway, Sebring, Florida	March 15–16	(United States) Riley Dickinson	(United States) Riley Dickinson	(United States) Riley Dickinson	(United States) Kelly-Moss Road and Race	(United States) Moisey Uretsky	(United States) Scott Noble
2	Sebring International Raceway, Sebring, Florida	March 15–16	(United States) Riley Dickinson	(United States) Riley Dickinson	(United States) Riley Dickinson	(United States) Kelly-Moss Road and Race	(United States) Alan Metni	(United States) Mark Kvamme
3	Long Beach Street Circuit, Long Beach, California	April 14–16	(United States) Riley Dickinson	(Australia) Tom Sargent	(United States) Riley Dickinson	(United States) Kelly-Moss Road and Race	(United States) Alan Metni	(United States) Mark Kvamme
4	Long Beach Street Circuit, Long Beach, California	April 14–16	(Australia) Tom Sargent	(United States) Riley Dickinson	(United Kingdom) Will Martin	(United States) JDX Racing	(Canada) Marco Cirone	(United States) Mark Kvamme
5	Miami International Autodrome, Miami Gardens, Florida	May 5–7	(United States) Riley Dickinson	(United States) Riley Dickinson	(United States) Riley Dickinson	(United States) Kelly-Moss Road and Race	(Dominican Republic) Efrin Castro	(United States) Mark Kvamme
6	Miami International Autodrome, Miami Gardens, Florida	May 5–7	(United States) Riley Dickinson	(United States) Riley Dickinson	(United States) Riley Dickinson	(United States) Kelly-Moss Road and Race	(Dominican Republic) Efrin Castro	(United States) Mark Kvamme
7	(New York (state)) Watkins Glen International, Watkins Glen, New York	June 22–25	(United Kingdom) Will Martin	(United Kingdom) Will Martin	(United States) Jason Hart	(United States) MDK Motorsports	(United States) Jeff Mosing	(United States) John Goetz
8	(New York (state)) Watkins Glen International, Watkins Glen, New York	June 22–25	(United Kingdom) Will Martin	(United Kingdom) Will Martin	(United Kingdom) Will Martin	(United States) JDX Racing	(United States) Jeff Mosing	(United States) Mark Kvamme
9	Road America, Elkhart Lake, Wisconsin	July 27–29	(United States) Riley Dickinson	(United States) Riley Dickinson	(United States) Riley Dickinson	(United States) Kelly-Moss Road and Race	(Dominican Republic) Efrin Castro	(United States) Scott Noble
10	Road America, Elkhart Lake, Wisconsin	July 27–29	(United States) Riley Dickinson	(United States) Riley Dickinson	(United States) Riley Dickinson	(United States) Kelly-Moss Road and Race	(Dominican Republic) Efrin Castro	(United States) Scott Noble
11	Indianapolis Motor Speedway, Speedway, Indiana	September 15–17	(United States) Riley Dickinson	(Australia) Tom Sargent	(United States) Riley Dickinson	(United States) Kelly-Moss Road and Race	(Dominican Republic) Efrin Castro	(United States) Scott Noble
12	Indianapolis Motor Speedway, Speedway, Indiana	September 15–17	(United States) Riley Dickinson	(United States) Riley Dickinson	(United States) Riley Dickinson	(United States) Kelly-Moss Road and Race	(Dominican Republic) Efrin Castro	(United States) Scott Noble
13	WeatherTech Raceway Laguna Seca, Monterey, California	September 28 – October 1	(United Kingdom) Will Martin	(United Kingdom) Alex Sedgwick	(Australia) Tom Sargent	(Australia) McElrea Racing	(Dominican Republic) Efrin Castro	(United States) Scott Noble
14	WeatherTech Raceway Laguna Seca, Monterey, California	September 28 – October 1	(United Kingdom) Will Martin	(United Kingdom) Will Martin	(United Kingdom) Will Martin	(United States) JDX Racing	(United States) P. J. Hyett	(United States) Scott Noble
15	Circuit of the Americas, Austin, Texas	October 20–22	(Australia) Tom Sargent	(United States) Riley Dickinson	(United States) Riley Dickinson	(United States) Kelly-Moss Road and Race	(United States) James Sofronas	(United States) Mark Kvamme
16	Circuit of the Americas, Austin, Texas	October 20–22	(United States) Riley Dickinson	(United States) Riley Dickinson	(United States) Riley Dickinson	(United States) Kelly-Moss Road and Race	(United States) James Sofronas	(United States) Mark Kvamme

== Championship standings ==
=== Points system ===
Championship points are awarded in each class at the finish of each event. Points are awarded based on finishing positions in the race as shown in the chart below.

Position	**1st**	**2nd**	**3rd**	**4th**	**5th**	**6th**	**7th**	**8th**	**9th**	**10th**	**11th**	**12th**	**13th**	**14th**	**15th**	Pole	FL
Points	25	20	17	14	12	10	9	8	7	6	5	4	3	2	1	2	1

For Pro-Am and Am championship, lowest two race results before the final round are dropped. All pole position and fastest lap points are retained.

=== Driver's Championship ===
Pos.	Driver	SEB (Florida)		LBH (California)		MIA (Florida)		WGL (New York (state))		ELK (Wisconsin)		IMS (Indiana)		LGA (California)		AUS (Texas)		Points
Overall
1	(United States) Riley Dickinson	**1**	**1**	**1**	3	**1**	**1**	2	2	**1**	**1**	**1**	**1**	36	2	1	**1**	382
2	(Australia) Tom Sargent	2	2	2	**2**	2	20	3	4	6	9	6	19	1	3	**2**	3	243
3	(United Kingdom) Will Martin	3	4	4	1	37	2	**32**	**1**	4	12	16	2	**35**	**1**	6	28	199
4	(United Kingdom) Alex Sedgwick	7	12	8	5	25	3	4	5	2	10	3	3	9	10	3	4	181
5	(United States) Jason Hart	4	3	30	DNS	18	7	1	3	9	5	9	24	4	15	10	5	141
6	(United Kingdom) Dan Clarke	5	5	9	29	38	DNS	5	6	3	25	2	5	3	4	12	31	137
7	(New Zealand) Ryan Yardley	11	25	5	7	4	8	7	11	19	7	28	6	5	5	7	2	134
8	(Dominican Republic) Jimmy Llibre	15	7	6	4	39	11	8	18	7	8	4	10	10	6	9	29	107
9	(United States) Sean Varwig	8	36	10	30	12	12	10	8	11	4	7	26	2	7	11	24	98
10	(United States) Thomas Merrill	10	9	7	10	28	15			10	2	5	7	8	18	8	27	92
11	(United States) Varun Choksey	6	6	31	8	35	6	22	9	12	11	10	8	30	13	35	6	81
12	(United States) Michael McCarthy	9	8	29	DNS	14	17	6	7	20	28	13	4	33	11	4	11	77
13	(United States) Travis Wiley	16	15	27	9	5	10	12	16	8	6	8	25	6	8	36	DNS	74
14	(United States) Michael McCann	26	14	3	31	3	4	34	19	WD	WD	11	23	11	16	18	23	60
15	(United States) Michael Cooper							33	10	5	3			31	9	5	30	54
16	(United States) Sabré Cook	14	16	12	26	6	9	13	15	13	29	12	27					34
17	(Dominican Republic) Efrin Castro	23	26	16	15	8	14	15	14	14	14	15	11	13	25	19	12	31
18	(Canada) Thomas Nepveu	13	11	11	28	32	5	11	33									30
19	(United States) Elias De La Torre	34	21	13	27	19	18	9	12	15	13	14	9	DNS	DNS	14	32	29
20	(Canada) Stefan Rzadzinski	33	23	14	12	7	37	21	17	16	31	19	14	14	17	16	7	28
21	(United States) Grant Talkie	12	13	DNS	6	29	13											20
22	(Australia) Bayley Hall													7	12	17	34	13
23	(Canada) Marco Cirone	18	20	19	13	9	16	16	21	17	30	17	28					10
24	(United States) Chris Bellomo	24	38	24	18	13	21	23	32	24	19	25	21	16	22	20	10	9
25	(United States) Kyle Washington			32	21	10	24			31	27	20	15	17	29	26	14	9
26	(United States) Francis Selldorff															23	8	8
27	(United States) James Sofronas															15	9	8
28	(United States) Jake Pedersen	39	27	17	11			35†	20	23	17	18	13	19	28	34	33	8
29	(United States) Nick Boulle							20	22					15	20	13	13	7
30	(United States) Jeff Mosing	27	18	18	14	33	38	14	13	33	DNS							7
31	(United States) T.J. Fischer	38	10															6
32	Moisey Uretsky	17	19	20	19	11	19	18	23	18	15			32	26	24	16	6
33	(Canada) Nicky Hays													12	14			6
34	(United States) Alan Metni	19	17	15	DNS			19	31			21	12					5
35	(United States) Mark Kvamme	21	24	21	16	15	22	26	24	22	18	23	17	22	23	21	17	1
36	(United States) Kayden Kelly															27	15	1
37	(United States) Scott Noble	30	39	22	22	34	25	25	25	21	16	22	16	20	21	22	35	0
38	(United States) Thomas Collingwood					16	23							24	27	32	DNS	0
39	(United States) P. J. Hyett			DNS	DNS			17	DNS	32	DNS			18	19	37	26	0
40	(United States) John Goetz	22	40	33	17	40	28	24	29	30	20	24	18	23	30	28	20	0
41	(United States) Michael Merritt	40	32	23	24	17	29	27	30	29	21			26	32	30	21	0
42	(United States) Todd Parriott			25	25	23	31			28	26			34	DNS	29	18	0
43	(United States) Blake McDonald													21	24	25	19	0
44	(United States) Christian Cole	29	30	28	20	20	30	28	27									0
45	(United States) James McCann	36	35	26	23	22	34	29	26	27	24	26	20	27	33	33	25	0
46	(United States) Don Yount					21	33											0
47	(United States) Grady Willingham	32	31			26	35	30	28	25	22	27	22	28	31	31	22	0
48	(United States) Conor Flynn	30	22			31	26											0
49	(United States) Tom Balames	35	34			24	32			26	23			29	34			0
50	(United States) Bob Mueller	25	37			30	DNS							25	35			0
51	(United States) Phillip Martien	37	33			27	36	31	34							DNS	DNS	0
52	(United States) Jeffrey Majkrzak	28	28															0
53	(United States) Matt Halcome	31	29															0
54	(United States) Joe Still	DNS	DNS															0
Guest drivers ineligible to score points
	(Netherlands) Kay van Berlo					36	27											0
Pro-Am
1	(Dominican Republic) Efrin Castro	(**23**)	(**26**)	16	15	**8**	**14**	**15**	**14**	**14**	14	**15**	**11**	13	**25**	19	**12**	337
2	(Canada) Marco Cirone	18	20	19	**13**	9	16	16	21	17	**30**	17	28					214
3	Moisey Uretsky	17	19	20	19	11	19	18	23	18	15			32	26	24	16	209
4	(United States) Chris Bellomo	24	(38)	24	18	13	21	(23)	32	24	19	25	21	16	22	**20**	10	208
5	(United States) Kyle Washington			32	21	10	24			31	27	20	15	17	29	26	14	152
6	(United States) Jeff Mosing	27	18	18	14	33	38	14	13	33	DNS							138
7	(United States) Alan Metni	19	17	**15**	DNS			19	31			21	12					124
8	(United States) Todd Parriott			25	25	23	31			28	26			34	DNS	29	18	85
9	(United States) P. J. Hyett			DNS	DNS			17	DNS	32	DNS			**18**	19	37	26	80
10	(United States) Christian Cole	29	30	28	20	20	30	28	27									74
11	(United States) Thomas Collingwood					16	23							24	27	32	DNS	54
12	(United States) James Sofronas															15	9	51
13	(United States) Kayden Kelly															27	15	22
14	(United States) Matt Halcome	31	29															18
15	(United States) Don Yount					21	33											15
Am
1	(United States) Mark Kvamme	21	24	**21**	**16**	**15**	22	(26)	24	(22)	18	23	17	**22**	**23**	21	17	334
2	(United States) Scott Noble	**30**	(**39**)	22	22	(34)	**25**	25	**25**	**21**	**16**	**22**	**16**	20	21	**22**	**35**	331
3	(United States) John Goetz	22	(40)	33	17	(40)	28	24	29	30	20	24	18	23	30	28	20	236
4	(United States) Michael Merritt	40	32	23	24	17	29	27	30	29	21			26	32	30	21	186
5	(United States) James McCann	(36)	(35)	26	23	22	34	**29**	26	27	24	26	20	27	33	33	25	177
6	(United States) Grady Willingham	32	31			26	35	30	28	25	22	27	22	28	31	31	22	174
7	(United States) Tom Balames	35	34			24	32			26	23			29	34			86
8	(United States) Phillip Martien	37	33			27	36	31	34							DNS	DNS	55
9	(United States) Bob Mueller	25	37			30	DNS							25	35			54
10	(United States) Jeffrey Majkrzak	28	28															32
11	(United States) Joe Still	DNS	DNS															0
Pos.	Driver	SEB (Florida)		LBH (California)		MIA (Florida)		WGL (New York (state))		ELK (Wisconsin)		IMS (Indiana)		LGA (California)		AUS (Texas)		Points

Colour	Result
Gold	Winner
Silver	Second place
Bronze	Third place
Green	Points classification
Blue	Non-points classification
Blue	Non-classified finish (NC)
Purple	Retired, not classified (Ret)
Red	Did not qualify (DNQ)
Red	Did not pre-qualify (DNPQ)
Black	Disqualified (DSQ)
White	Did not start (DNS)
White	Withdrew (WD)
White	Race cancelled (C)
Blank	Did not practice (DNP)
Blank	Did not arrive (DNA)
Blank	Excluded (EX)

- **Bold** - Pole position
- Italics - Fastest lap

†: Post-event penalty. Car moved to back of class.
