= Riley Dickinson =

American racing driver

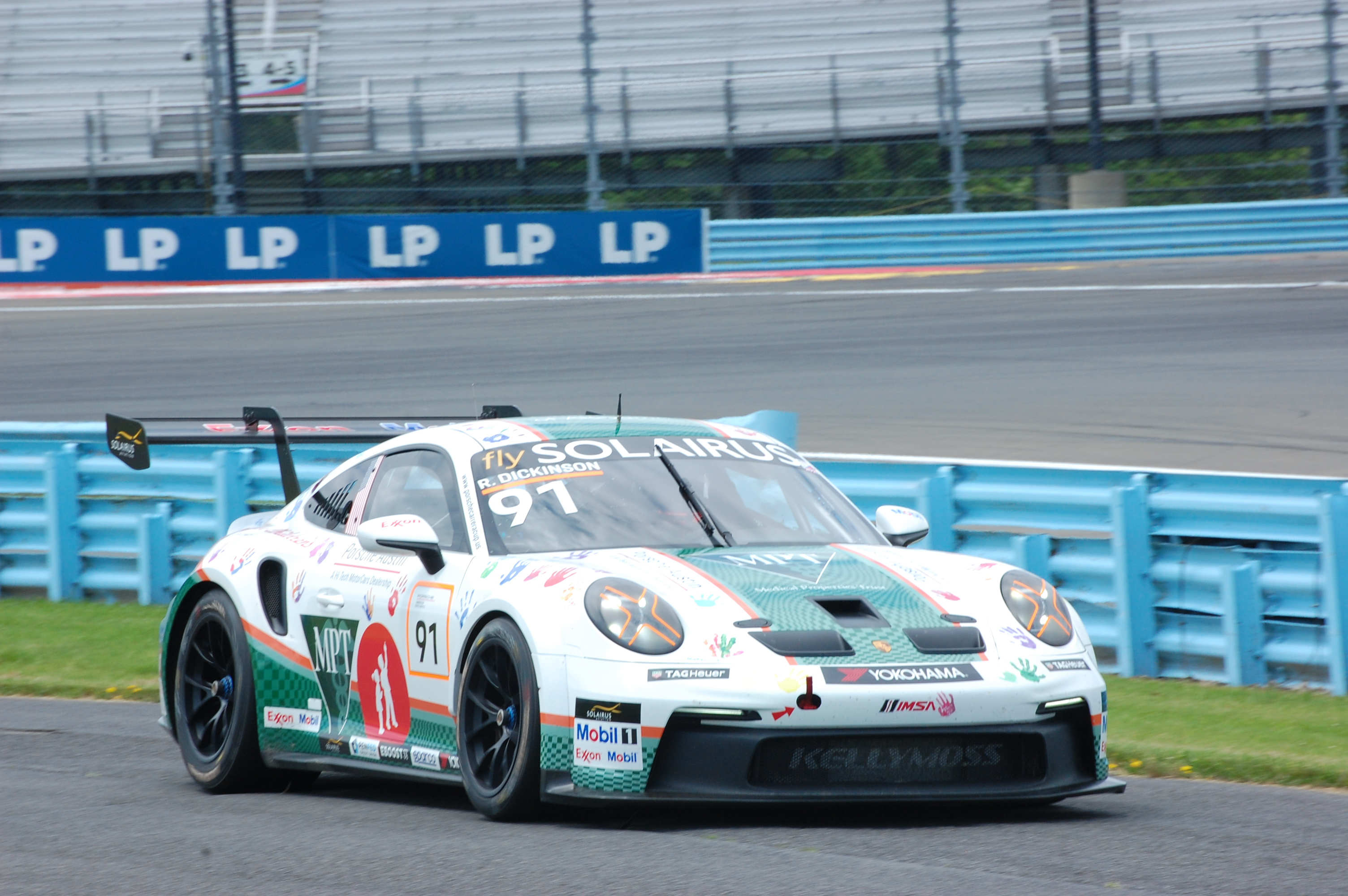
- Dickinson during the Watkins Glen round of the 2025 Porsche Carrera Cup North America
- Nationality: (United States) American
- Born: May 11, 2002 (age 24) New Braunfels, Texas, United States

Porsche Carrera Cup North America career
- Debut season: 2021
- Current team: Kelly-Moss Road and Race
- Categorisation: FIA Silver
- Car number: 53
- Former teams: Team Hardpoint EBM
- Starts: 48
- Wins: 12
- Podiums: 34
- Poles: 11
- Fastest laps: 16

Championship titles
- 2023: Porsche Carrera Cup North America
- Statistics up to date as of October 27, 2023.

Riley Dickinson (born May 10, 2002) is an American racing driver who competes in the Porsche Carrera Cup North America.

== Career ==
=== Early career ===
Dickinson began his karting career at the age of seven, electing to cease playing baseball in favor of a potential career on four wheels. He became one of the top karting drivers in the state of Texas, eventually winning the SKUSA S2 Pro Tour. In 2018, he linked up with driver coach Derek Eastty – friend of Moorespeed president David Moore – paving the way for Dickinson's jump to Porsche Cup competition in 2019.

=== IMSA GT3 Cup Challenge ===
At the age of 16, Dickinson graduated to full-time racing cars from the karting ladder, joining Moorespeed for the 2019 IMSA GT3 Cup Challenge season. He enjoyed a strong start to his pro racing career, claiming two podium finishes in the opening weekend of the season at Barber Motorsports Park. Later that season at Road Atlanta, Dickinson claimed his first career victory in the series, winning from pole in the first race of the weekend. Through 16 races, he claimed seven podium finishes en route to a third-place championship finish. Following the season's completion, Dickinson took part in the Porsche Motorsport North America Young Driver Academy back at Barber Motorsports Park, with the aims of securing the IMSA Hurley Haywood Scholarship for the 2020 GT3 Cup Challenge season. He would win the scholarship following the academy weekend, earning him a full-season entry for 2020 alongside tires, parts, and racing equipment.

Dickinson used his scholarship to return to Moorespeed for 2020, remaining in the platinum class. During the season, Dickinson also filed a column with news publication Sportscar365. After a delayed start to the season due to the COVID-19 pandemic, Dickinson scored his second career series victory in August at Road America, and became locked in a season-long points battle with Jeff Kingsley for the series championship. Dickinson went on to win four races during the 2020 season, but fell short of Kingsley and settled for second in the championship.

=== Porsche Carrera Cup North America ===
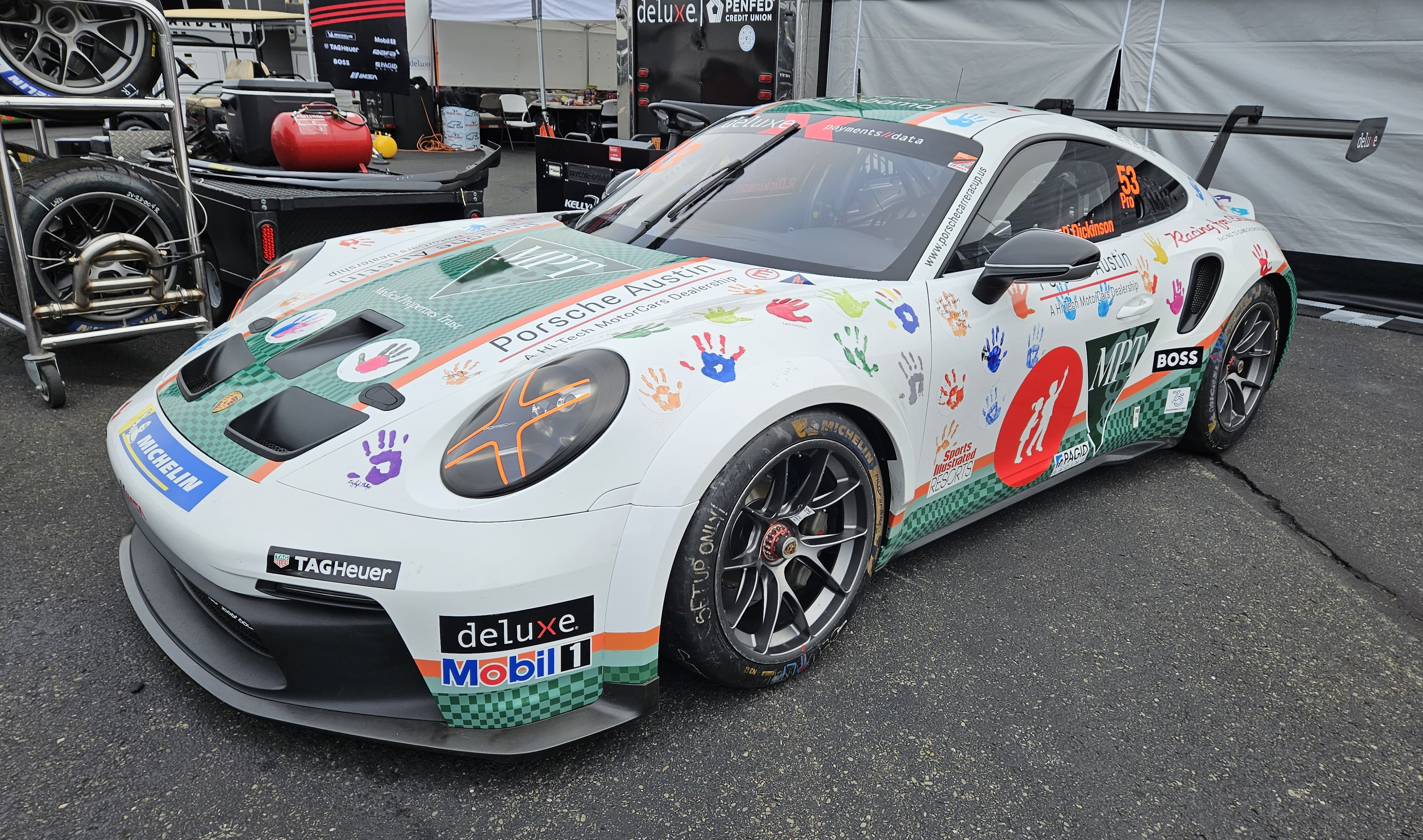
Dickinson's Porsche 911 GT3 Cup at Watkins Glen in 2023.

Despite the reformatting of the IMSA GT3 Cup Challenge to the Porsche Carrera Cup North America for 2021, Dickinson remained in the series, switching teams to join Team Hardpoint EBM in the Pro class. Although he claimed no race victories, Dickinson finished fourth in the championship thanks to eight podium finishes during the 16-race season, 42 points behind third-placed Parker Thompson.

2022 saw Dickinson join Kelly-Moss Road and Race as Team Hardpoint EBM discontinued their participation in the series. Additionally, Dickinson paired with a new sponsor, seeing his car sponsored by the Medical Properties Trust and their Racing for Children's program. The sponsor held particular significance for Dickinson, as he'd lost a teammate to cancer during his karting days. His 2022 season began auspiciously, as Dickinson topped the series' pre-season test at Sebring. He claimed his sole overall victory of the 2022 season at Indianapolis in September, and finished third in the championship with 11 podiums to his name. Late in the 2022 season, Dickinson embarked on a one-off appearance in the Porsche Supercup at Silverstone, finishing 15th.

Ahead of the 2023 season, Dickinson joined the Porsche Junior Program North America alongside a number of his Pro-class competitors in the Carrera Cup. He quickly established himself as a championship contender during the 2023 season, sweeping the opening weekend at Sebring as well as at Miami and Road America. Additionally, he finished on the podium in each of the first ten races of the season. After completing another weekend sweep at Indianapolis in September, Dickinson clinched the series championship with four races to spare.

== Racing record ==
=== Career summary ===
| Season | Series | Team | Races | Wins | Poles | F/Laps | Podiums | Points | Position |
|---|---|---|---|---|---|---|---|---|---|
| 2019 | IMSA GT3 Cup Challenge - Platinum | Moorespeed | 16 | 1 | 2 | 3 | 7 | 427 | **3rd** |
| 2019 | Radical Cup North America - Masters | Moorespeed | 3 | 1 | 2 | 2 | 1 | 107 | 8th |
| 2019 | Porsche Carrera Cup Asia | Earl Bamber Motorsport | 2 | 0 | 0 | 0 | 0 | 0 | 28th |
| 2020 | IMSA GT3 Cup Challenge - Platinum | Moorespeed | 16 | 4 | 3 | 7 | 14 | 514 | **2nd** |
| 2021 | Porsche Carrera Cup North America - Pro | Team Hardpoint EBM | 16 | 0 | 0 | 3 | 8 | 216 | 4th |
| 2022 | Porsche Carrera Cup North America - Pro | Kelly-Moss Road and Race | 16 | 1 | 1 | 3 | 11 | 264 | **3rd** |
| 2022 | Porsche Supercup | Kelly-Moss Road and Race | 1 | 0 | 0 | 0 | 0 | 0 | NC† |
| 2022 | IMSA Prototype Challenge | Mühlner Motorsports America | 1 | 0 | 0 | 0 | 0 | 160 | 39th |
| 2023 | Porsche Carrera Cup North America - Pro | Kelly-Moss Road and Race | 16 | 11 | 10 | 10 | 15 | 382 | **1st** |
| 2024 | Michelin Pilot Challenge - GS | Kellymoss with Riley | 10 | 2 | 0 | 0 | 2 | 2350 | 6th |
| 2024 | IMSA SportsCar Championship - GTD | Kellymoss with Riley | 1 | 0 | 0 | 0 | 0 | 251 | 55th |
| 2025 | GT4 America Series - Pro-Am | ACI Motorsports | | | | | | | |
| 2025 | Porsche Carrera Cup North America | Kellymoss | 16 | 5 | 4 | 5 | 9 | 294 | **2nd** |
| 2026 | GT World Challenge America - Pro-Am | Kellymoss | 7 | 0 | 0 | 0 | 0 | 24 | 14th |
| 2026 | GT4 America Series - Silver | Kellymoss | | | | | | | |

^{*} Season still in progress.
^{†} As Dickinson was a guest driver, he was ineligible to score points.

=== Complete Porsche Carrera Cup North America results ===
(key) (Races in bold indicate pole position) (Races in italics indicate fastest lap)

| Year | Team | 1 | 2 | 3 | 4 | 5 | 6 | 7 | 8 | 9 | 10 | 11 | 12 | 13 | 14 | 15 | 16 | Pos | Points |
|---|---|---|---|---|---|---|---|---|---|---|---|---|---|---|---|---|---|---|---|
| 2021 | Team Hardpoint EBM | SEB; 1; 6 | SEB; 2; 3 | AUS; 1; 4 | AUS; 2; 3 | WGL; 1; 4 | WGL; 2; 7 | ELK; 1; 3 | ELK; 2; 7 | IMS; 1; 3 | IMS; 2; 12 | IMS; 3; 2 | VIR; 1; 3 | VIR; 2; 2 | ATL; 1; 4 | ATL; 2; 25 | ATL; 3; 3 | 4th | 216 |
| 2022 | Kelly-Moss Road and Race | SEB; 1; 3 | SEB; 2; 2 | LBH; 1; 6 | LBH; 2; 29 | LGA; 1; 3 | **LGA**; **2**; 2 | WGL; 1; 2 | WGL; 2; 2 | TOR; 1; 3 | TOR; 2; 3 | ELK; 1; 7 | ELK; 2; 10 | IMS; 1; 2 | IMS; 2; 1 | ATL; 1; 5 | ATL; 2; 2 | 3rd | 264 |
| 2023 | Kellymoss | **SEB**; **1**; 1 | **SEB**; **2**; 1 | **LBH**; **1**; 1 | LBH; 2; 3 | **MIA**; **1**; 1 | **MIA**; **2**; 1 | WGL; 1; 2 | WGL; 2; 2 | **ELK**; **1**; 1 | **ELK**; **2**; 1 | **IMS**; **1**; 1 | **IMS**; **2**; 1 | LGA; 1; 36 | LGA; 2; 2 | AUS; 1; 1 | **AUS**; **2**; 1 | 1st | 382 |

^{*} Season still in progress.

=== Complete Porsche Supercup results ===
(key) (Races in bold indicate pole position) (Races in italics indicate fastest lap)

| Year | Team | 1 | 2 | 3 | 4 | 5 | 6 | 7 | 8 | Pos. | Points |
|---|---|---|---|---|---|---|---|---|---|---|---|
| 2022 | Kelly-Moss Road and Race | IMO | MON | SIL; 15 | RBR | LEC | SPA | ZND | MNZ | NC† | 0 |

^{†} As Dickinson was a guest driver, he was ineligible to score points.

=== Complete IMSA SportsCar Championship results ===
(key) (Races in bold indicate pole position; results in italics indicate fastest lap)

| Year | Team | Class | Make | Engine | 1 | 2 | 3 | 4 | 5 | 6 | 7 | 8 | 9 | 10 | Pos. | Points |
|---|---|---|---|---|---|---|---|---|---|---|---|---|---|---|---|---|
| 2024 | Kelly-Moss with Riley | GTD | Porsche 911 GT3 R (992) | Porsche M97/80 4.2 L Flat-6 | DAY | SEB | LBH | LGA | WGL | MOS | ELK | VIR | IMS; 8 | PET | 55th | 251 |
