= Efrin Castro =

Racing driver from the Dominican Republic

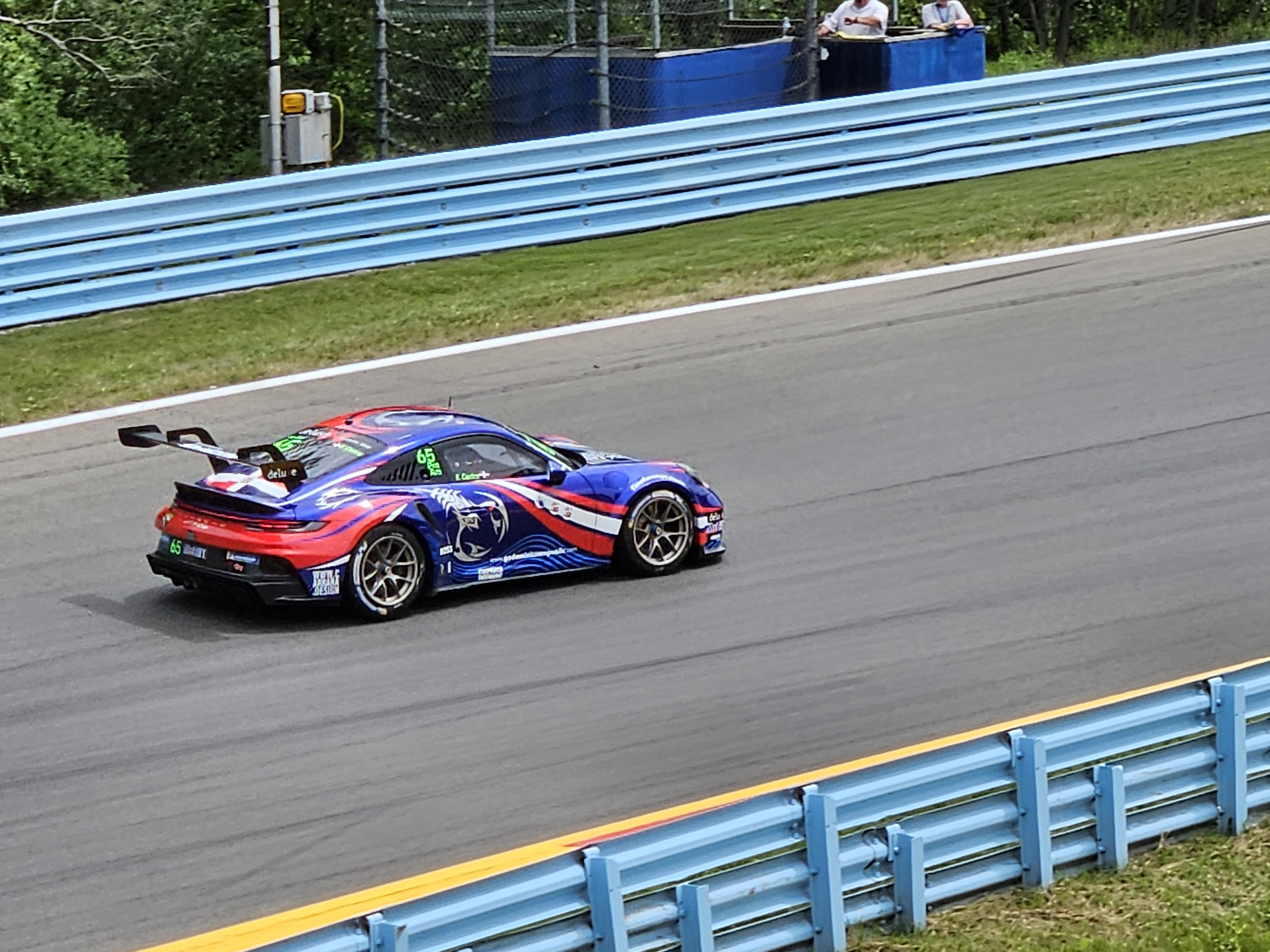
- Nationality: Dominican
- Born: 27 October 1975 (age 51)

FIA World Endurance Championship career
- Current team: Project 1 Motorsport
- Categorisation: FIA Bronze
- Years active: 2023
- Starts: 1 (1 entry)
- Wins: 0
- Podiums: 0
- Poles: 0
- Fastest laps: 0

Previous series
- 2018 2019–2020 2021–2023 2022 2022 2023: SprintX GT Championship Series – GTS; Porsche GT3 Cup Challenge USA – Gold; Porsche Carrera Cup North America – Pro-Am; IMSA SportsCar Championship – LMP3; IMSA Prototype Challenge; Porsche GT3 Cup Challenge Middle East

Championship titles
- 2021: Porsche Carrera Cup North America – Pro-Am

Efrin Castro (born 27 October 1975) is a Dominican racing driver who last raced in the 2024 Porsche Carrera Cup North America. He previously competed in the FIA World Endurance Championship.

== Racing record ==
=== Career summary ===
Season	Series	Team	Races	Wins	Poles	F/Laps	Podiums	Points	Position
2018	SprintX GT Championship Series - GTS Class	Mühlner Motorsport	2	0	0	0	2	44	19th
2019	Porsche GT3 Cup Challenge USA - Gold Class	ACI Motorsports	16	0	0	0	4	433	4th
2020	Porsche GT3 Cup Challenge USA - Gold Class	TPC Racing	13	6	4	10	13	520	**2nd**
2021	Porsche Carrera Cup North America - Pro-Am	Earl Bamber Motorsport	16	7	4	7	13	318	**1st**
2022	IMSA SportsCar Championship - LMP3	Mühlner Motorsport	1	0	0	0	0	0	NC
2022	IMSA Prototype Challenge	Mühlner Motorsport	1	0	0	0	0	160	39th
2022	Porsche Carrera Cup North America - Pro-Am	Kelly-Moss Road and Race	16	9	0	11	0	288	**2nd**
2023	Porsche Sprint Challenge Middle East	Team GP Elite	2	0	0	0	0	?	?
2023	Porsche Carrera Cup North America	Kelly-Moss Road and Race	16	0	0	0	0	31	17th
2023	Porsche Carrera Cup North America - Pro-Am	Kelly-Moss Road and Race	16	7	11	7	14	337	**1st**
2023	FIA World Endurance Championship - GTEAm	Project 1 – AO	1	0	0	0	0	4	25th
2024	Porsche Carrera Cup North America	Kellymoss	14	0	0	0	0	24	17th

*Season in progress

=== Complete 24 Hours of Daytona results ===
Year	Team	Co-Drivers	Car	Class	Laps	Pos.	Class Pos.
2022	(Belgium) Mühlner Motorsport	(Germany) Moritz Kranz (United States) Joel Miller (United States) Ayrton Ori	Duqueine D-08	LMP3	363	DNF	DNF

=== Complete FIA World Endurance Championship results ===
(key) (Races in bold indicate pole position; races in italics indicate fastest lap)

Year	Entrant	Class	Car	Engine	1	2	3	4	5	6	7	Rank	Points
2023	Project 1 – AO	LMGTE Am	Porsche 911 RSR-19	Porsche M97/80 4.2 L Flat-6	SEB	PRT	SPA	LMS	MNZ; 8	FUJ	BHR	25th	4

*Season in progress.
