= Porsche Carrera Cup North America =

International sporting competition

- Category: One-make racing by Porsche
- Country: North America
- Inaugural season: 2021
- Constructors: Porsche
- Tyre suppliers: Yokohama
- Drivers' champion: (United States) Tyler Maxson
- Teams' champion: (United States) Topp Racing
- Official website: Carrera Cup North America

Porsche Carrera Cup North America is a one-make racing series that takes place in North America featuring Porsche 911 GT3 Cup cars. The series is sanctioned by the International Motor Sports Association.

== History ==
In September 2020, Porsche announced the creation of a new single-make racing series to take place in the United States and Canada, replacing both IMSA GT3 Cup Challenge USA and IMSA GT3 Cup Challenge Canada. The Porsche Carrera Cup North America would be launched in 2021 in partnership with sanctioning body IMSA and Michelin, who would become the exclusive tire provider for the series. The 2021 class structure consisted of the open Pro class, a Pro-Am class designated for drivers 45 years of age and older, and Pro-Am 991 for older generation 991.2-spec Porsche 911 GT3 Cup cars.

The series' inaugural race at Sebring would also mark the worldwide customer racing debut of the new-for-2021 992-spec Porsche 911 GT3 Cup car. By October 2020, five months before the first race was set to begin, Porsche had sold out of their allocations of the new car for North America. The first ever race was won by Sebastian Priaulx, who would become the series' inaugural champion.

The series would garner title sponsorship from the Cayman Islands Department of Tourism for the 2021 and 2022 seasons. With this title sponsorship came an expanded prize package, which included a trip to a five-star resort in the Cayman Islands. The series also underwent a change to the class structure in 2022, with the Pro-Am 991 class dropped in favor of an Am class for drivers over the age of 57. That year, JDX Racing's Parker Thompson would win the series title.

In 2023, Deluxe Corporation took over title sponsorship. The series also expanded its support bill beyond the IMSA umbrella, supporting two Formula 1 Grands Prix at Miami and Circuit of the Americas as well as the Nascar Xfinity Series event at Road America. With four races to spare in the 2023 championship, Riley Dickinson would score the overall title.

For 2024, Long Beach and Laguna Seca were dropped from the schedule in favor of a return to Road Atlanta and an additional round supporting the Canadian Grand Prix. The ANDIAL Cup was also launched, an in-season championship for the rounds supporting IMSA-sanctioned events designed to incentivize entries outside of the 40-car limit when supporting Formula 1. Replacing Michelin, Yokohama became the series' exclusive tire supplier for 2024.

== Circuits ==
- (Quebec) Circuit Gilles Villeneuve (2024–2025)
- (Texas) Circuit of the Americas (2021, 2023–present)
- (Florida) Daytona International Speedway (2027)
- (Indiana) Indianapolis Motor Speedway (2021–2026)
- (California) Laguna Seca (2022–2023)
- (California) Long Beach Street Circuit (2022–2023, 2026)
- (Florida) Miami International Autodrome (2023–present)
- (Wisconsin) Road America (2021–present)
- (Georgia (U.S. state)) Road Atlanta (2021–2022, 2024–present)
- (Florida) Sebring International Raceway (2021–present)
- (Ontario) Toronto Street Circuit (2022)
- Virginia International Raceway (2021)
- (New York (state)) Watkins Glen International (2021–2026)

== Champions ==
Season	Champion	Pro-Am Champion	PA991 Champion	Team Champion
2021	(Guernsey) Sebastian Priaulx	(Dominican Republic) Efrin Castro	(United States) Matt Halcome	(Canada) Kelly-Moss Road and Race
Season	Champion	Pro-Am Champion	Am/Masters Champion	Team Champion
2022	(Canada) Parker Thompson	(United States) Alan Metni	(United States) Mark Kvamme	(United States) Kelly-Moss Road and Race
2023	(United States) Riley Dickinson	(Dominican Republic) Efrin Castro	(United States) Mark Kvamme	(United States) Kellymoss
2024	(Netherlands) Loek Hartog	(United States) Alan Metni	(United States) Chris Bellomo	(United States) Kellymoss
2026	(New Zealand) Ryan Yardley	(United States) JP Martinez	(United States) Scott Blind	(United States) Topp Racing
2026	(United States) Tyler Maxson	(United States) Patrick Mulcahy	(Canada) Marco Cirone	(United States) Topp Racing
