= Mark Kvamme =

American venture capitalist and race car driver

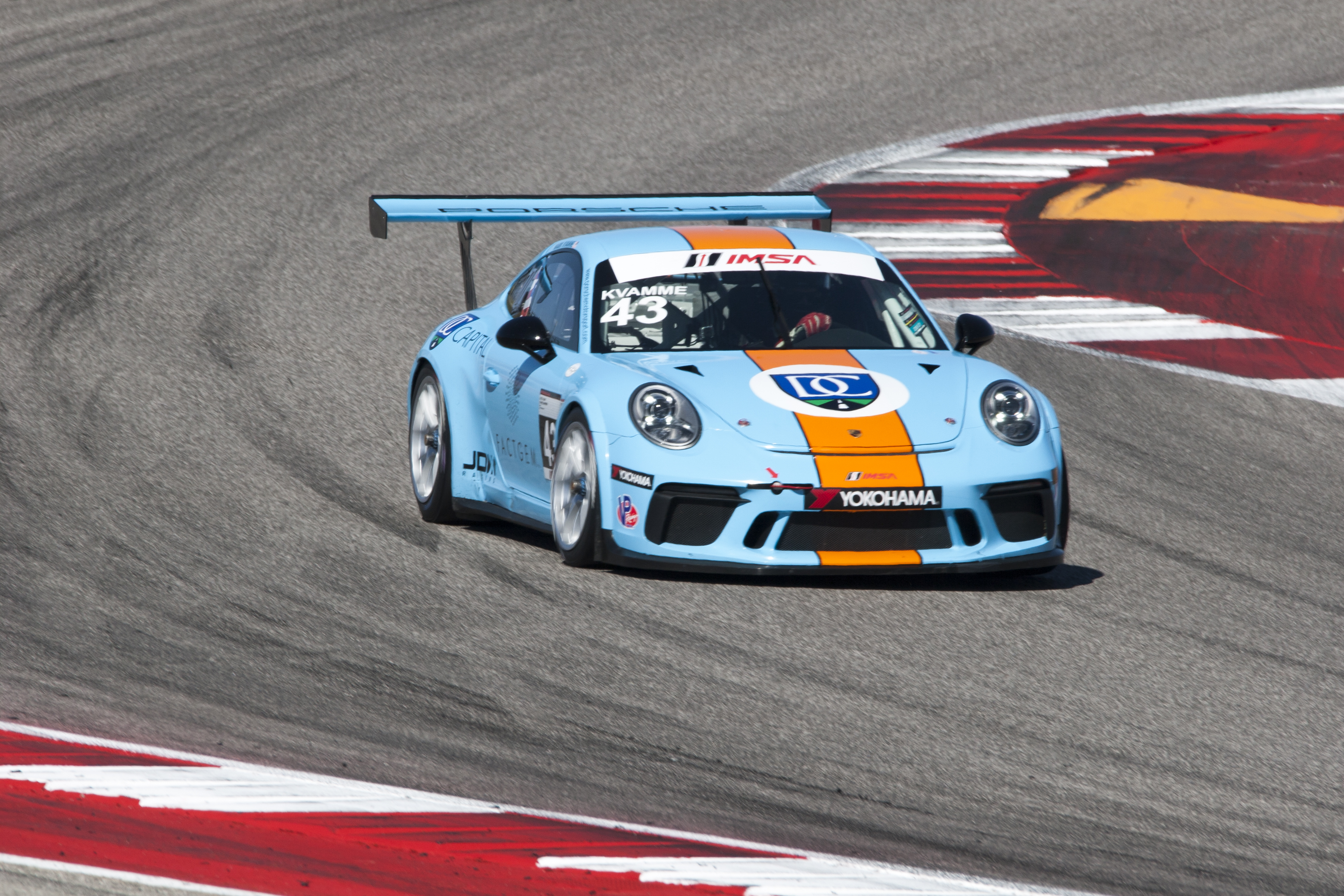
- Born: Mark David Kvamme; February 20, 1961 (age 65); Sunnyvale, California, U.S.
- Education: University of California, Berkeley
- Occupations: Co-founder and partner of Drive Capital, The Ohio Fund, Eagle Electronics, and 1872 AI
- Spouse: MJ
- Children: 8
- Parent(s): Jean and Floyd Kvamme
- Family: Kvamme Family

WeatherTech SportsCar Championship career
- Debut season: 2014
- Current team: MDK Motorsports
- Categorisation: FIA Bronze
- Car number: 53
- Former teams: Muehlner Motorsports, RG Racing, Starworks Motorsport, BAR1 Motorsports, Turner Motorsport
- Starts: 21
- Championships: 0
- Wins: 0
- Podiums: 3
- Poles: 0
- Best finish: 8th in 2017
- Finished last season: 14th (2019)

Asian Le Mans Series career
- Debut season: 2019–20
- Current team: Rick Ware Racing
- Car number: 52
- Engine: Acura AR35TT 3.5 L Turbo V6
- Co-driver: Cody Ware
- Starts: 1
- Championships: 0
- Wins: 0
- Podiums: 1
- Poles: 0

Previous series
- 2017–2018: Porsche GT3 Cup Challenge USA
- Statistics up to date as of November 26, 2019.

Mark David Kvamme (born February 20, 1961) is an American venture capitalist who founded Drive Capital and a sports car racing driver and team owner of MDK Motorsports.

== Business career ==
Kvamme founded Drive Capital with Chris Olsen in 2013. He currently sits on the board of Wexner Center for the Arts, Aver Informatics, FarmLogs, Clinc, Funny or Die, Gecko Robotics, Muve Health, Physna, and Udacity. He specializes in innovative technology, healthcare and consumer investments in the Midwest. Before Drive Capital, Kvamme was the interim chief investment officer and president of JobsOhio. Prior to JobsOhio, Kvamme was a partner at Sequoia Capital, the chairman and CEO of CKS Group, the director of international marketing at Wyse Technology, president and CEO of International Solutions and a founding member of Apple France.

Kvamme formerly worked as state development director in the administration of Ohio Governor John Kasich. In 2015, Kvamme donated $500,000 to Kasich's 2016 presidential campaign through the limited liability corporation MMWP12.

== Racing career ==
Kvamme grew up in motorcycle racing, but did not pursue a career in it. After competing in off-road truck racing, he moved to sports cars, racing in the WeatherTech SportsCar Championship starting in 2014. In 2017, he placed third at the Rolex 24hrs of Daytona in the Prototype Challenge class. He also began competing in the Porsche GT3 Cup Challenge USA, and finished second in the Platinum Cup Masters championship with two wins (Barber Motorsports Park and Virginia International Raceway).

In late 2019, Kvamme joined Rick Ware Racing's Asian Le Mans Series program, where he shared the No. 52 Ligier JS P2 with Cody Ware. In their first race at Shanghai International Circuit, despite missing qualifying and only having two laps of practice, Ware and Kvamme finished second in the LMPS Am class and 14th overall.

Kvamme's team MDK Motorsports was also active in motocross during the early 2000s, and returned to the sport for the 2022 season of the reborn FIM World Supercross Championship.

== Personal life ==
Kvamme is the son of E. Floyd Kvamme, a former entrepreneur and a venture capitalist at Kleiner Perkins Caufield & Byers. Apple France was created in 1982; as a "Founding Member", Kvamme was living in France at that time and working for Jean Louis Gassee.

Kvamme has a BA from the University of California, Berkeley.

== Motorsports career results ==
=== Complete WeatherTech SportsCar Championship results ===
(key)(Races in bold indicate pole position, Results are overall/class)

Year	Team	Class	Make	Engine	1	2	3	4	5	6	7	8	9	10	11	Rank	Points
2015	RG Racing	P	Riley Mk XXVI DP	Dinan (BMW) 5.0 L V8	DAY; 6	SIR	LBH	LGA	DET	WGL	MSP	ELK	COA	PET		27th	26
2022	Forty7 Motorsports	LMP3	Duqueine M30 - D08	Nissan VK56DE 5.6 L V8	DAY; 8	SEB; 8	MDO	WGL	MOS	ELK	PET					34th	251
2023	MDK Motorsports	GTD Pro	Porsche 911 GT3 R (992)	Porsche 4.2 L Flat-6	DAY; 6	SEB	LBH	MON	WGL	MOS	LIM	ELK	VIR	IMS	PET	26th	250

=== Asian Le Mans Series results ===
(key) (Races in bold indicate pole position) (Races in italics indicate fastest lap)

Year	Entrant	Class	Make	Engine	1	2	3	4	Pos	Points
2019–20	Rick Ware Racing	LMP2 Am	Ligier JS P2	Nissan VK45DE 4.5 L V8	SHA; 2	BEN	SEP	CHA	6th	18

=== Complete 24 Hours of Le Mans results ===
Year	Team	Co-Drivers	Car	Class	Laps	Pos.	Class Pos.
2022	(United Kingdom) JMW Motorsport	(United States) Jason Hart (Netherlands) Renger van der Zande	Ferrari 488 GTE Evo	GTE; Am	331	50th	15th
2023	(Poland) Inter Europol Competition	(Denmark) Anders Fjordbach (Denmark) Jan Magnussen	Oreca 07-Gibson	LMP2	117	DNF	DNF
