= 2023 12 Hours of Sebring =

71st 12 Hours of Sebring race

Sebring International Raceway

The 2023 12 Hours of Sebring (formally known as the 71st Mobil 1 Twelve Hours of Sebring Presented by Advance Auto Parts) was an endurance sports car race held at Sebring International Raceway near Sebring, Florida from 15 to 18 March 2023. It was the second round of both the 2023 IMSA SportsCar Championship and the Michelin Endurance Cup. Cadillac Racing entered as the defending overall winners of the 12-hour event, albeit in the new-for-2023 GTP class rather than DPi.

The race was won by the #31 Whelen Engineering Racing entry, driven by Pipo Derani, Jack Aitken, and Alexander Sims, after a late accident eliminated the top three GTP-class cars.

== Background ==
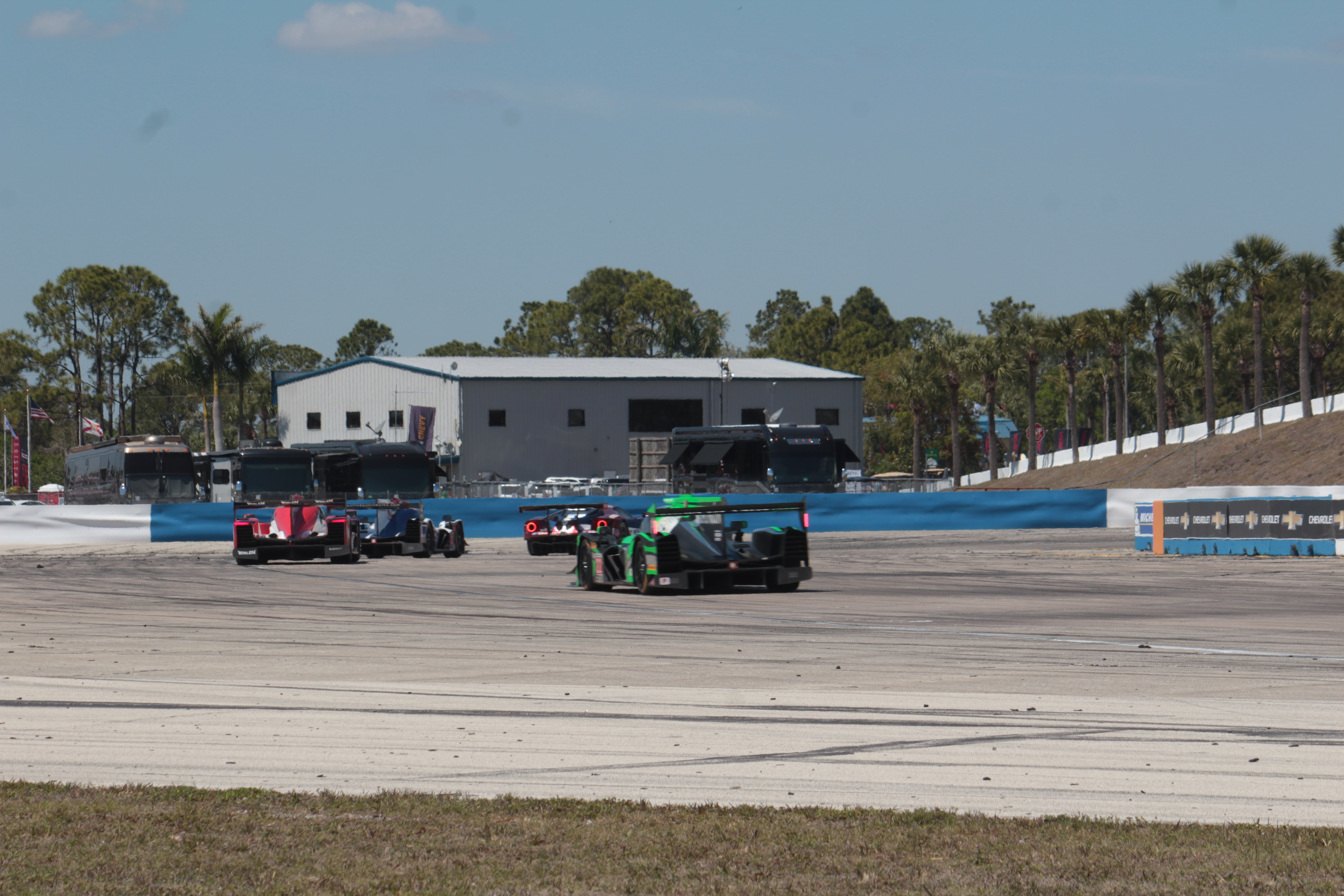
Sebring International Raceway, where the race was held.

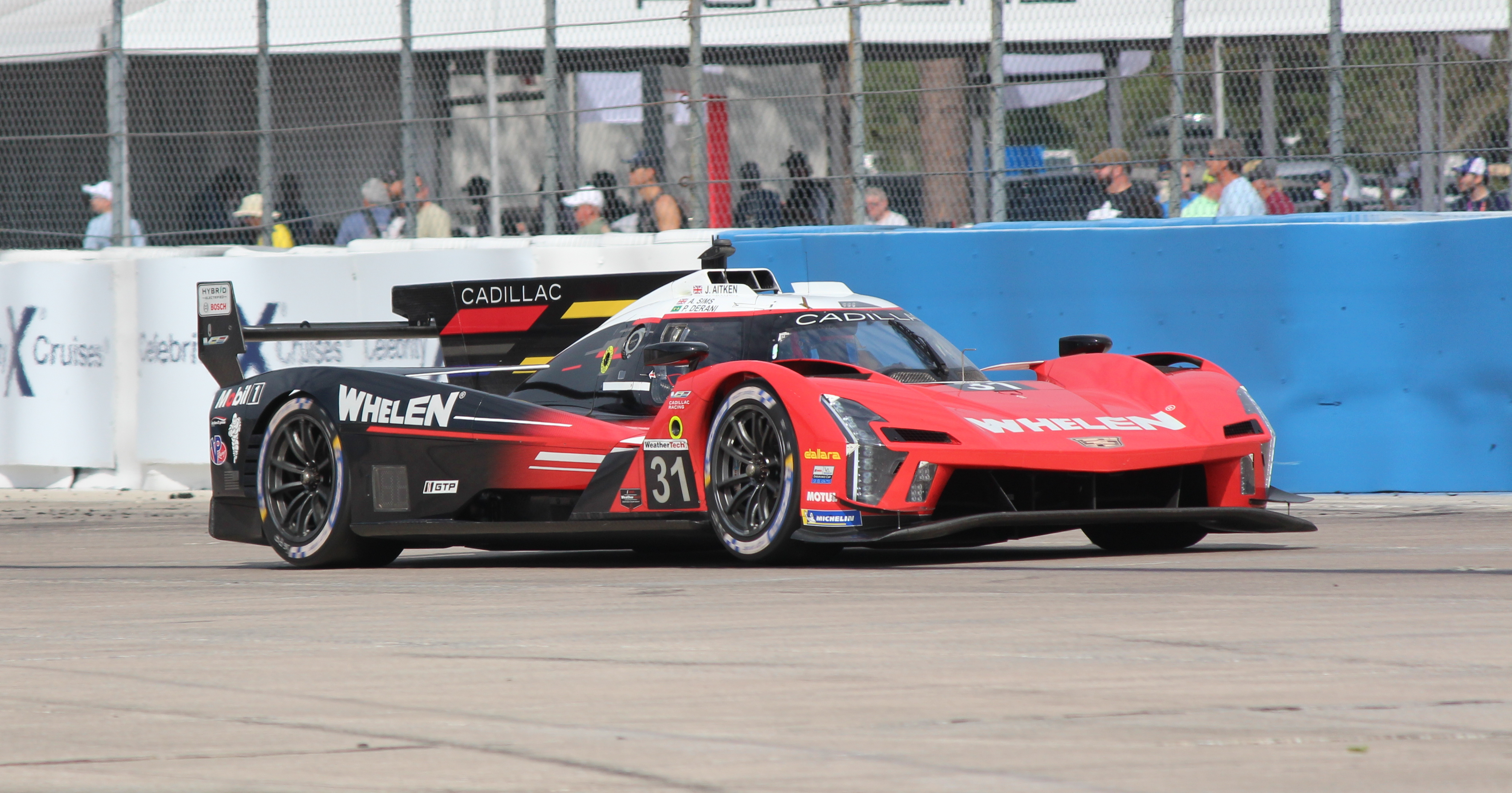
The #31 Whelen Engineering Racing Cadillac V-Series.R en route to victory.

International Motor Sports Association's (IMSA) president John Doonan confirmed the race was part of the schedule for the 2023 IMSA SportsCar Championship (IMSA SCC) in August 2022. It was the tenth consecutive year it was part of the IMSA SCC, and 71st 12 Hours of Sebring. The 12 Hours of Sebring was the second of eleven scheduled sports car endurance races of 2023 by IMSA, and the second of four races of the Michelin Endurance Cup (MEC). It was held at the 17-turn, 3.741-mile (6.021 km) Sebring International Raceway in Sebring, Florida on March 18, 2023.

2023 saw the introduction of LMDh machinery into the IMSA SportsCar Championship and FIA World Endurance Championship, allowing teams in the top classes to compete in both marquee series on the same weekend. The Acura ARX-06 of Meyer Shank Racing with Curb-Agajanian claimed victory in the first race in class history, the 2023 24 Hours of Daytona, and the car continued its early success by topping IMSA's sanctioned test that took place at Sebring approximately a month before the 12-hour event, albeit this time in the hands of Wayne Taylor Racing. Former racing driver and Sebring Hall of Fame inductee Lyn St. James served as the race's grand marshal.

The "Super Sebring" weekend also presented the opportunity for a number of drivers in other classes to compete in both endurance events in the same weekend. The Iron Dames trio of Michelle Gatting, Rahel Frey, and Sarah Bovy, for instance, competed in both the GTE Am category of the 1000 Miles of Sebring as well as the GTD class in the 12-hour. A total of 27 drivers pulled double duty across the two races, with only Dane Cameron and Michael Christensen running in the top class for both.

After the 24 Hours of Daytona five weeks earlier, Tom Blomqvist, Colin Braun, Hélio Castroneves, and Simon Pagenaud were leading the GTP Drivers' Championship with 385 points. However, on March 8, 2023, Meyer Shank Racing with Curb-Agajanian were penalized for manipulating tire pressure data during the Daytona race. As a result, the team lost its lead in the GTP championship standings, received a 200-point penalty, lost all team and driver Michelin Endurance Cup points, and forfeited race prize money. After the penalty was applied, Filipe Albuquerque, Ricky Taylor, Louis Delétraz, and Brendon Hartley took the lead in the GTP Drivers' Championship with 350 points while WTR with Andretti Autosport took the lead in the GTP Teams' Championship. Jules Gounon, Daniel Juncadella, Maro Engel, and Cooper MacNeil led the GTD Pro Drivers' Championship. In GTD, Roman De Angelis, Marco Sørensen, Ian James, and Darren Turner led the Drivers' Championship with 375 points. Acura, Mercedes-AMG, and Aston Martin were leading their respective Manufacturers' Championships, while WeatherTech Racing, and Heart of Racing Team each led their own Teams' Championships. LMP2 drivers and teams as well as LMP3 drivers and teams would be scoring their first championship points of the season due to Daytona only counting towards the Michelin Endurance Cup championship.

On March 8, 2023, IMSA released the latest technical bulletin outlining Balance of Performance for the GTP and LMP2 classes. Wholesale changes were introduced to the top class following the 24 Hours of Daytona, where all cars ran on equal metrics. All cars ran on a 1030 kilogram base weight at Daytona, whereas at Sebring the Cadillac ran at the lowest weight (1038 kg), with the BMW at 1040 kg, the Porsche at 1048 kg, and the Acura at 1054 kg. As a result, the Cadillac and BMW both ran at 513 kilowatts of power, while the Porsche ran with 517 kW and the Acura with 520 kW – up from 500 kW across the board at Daytona. Maximum stint energy figures were also adjusted. No performance changes were announced for the LMP2 class. On March 9, IMSA released the balance of performance metrics for the GTD class. The Porsche received a five millimeter increase to its air restrictor after suffering from a lack of straight-line speed at Daytona. This change marked a four millimeter increase from the Sebring test, after which several Porsche teams threatened to withdraw their entries from the series if BoP concerns were not addressed. The new-for-2023 Lamborghini also received an air restrictor size increase from 47 to 49 millimeters after suffering from a similar lack of pace in the opening round. The Ferrari received an increase in turbo boost pressure as well as a 15 kg weight increase, while the Acura also received similar changes in boost pressure but instead lost 15 kg. Other cars that received a weight break included the Aston Martin, BMW, Corvette, and Lexus, while the Mercedes received an equivalent increase.

Aside from the WEC support race, the Michelin Pilot Challenge and Porsche Carrera Cup North America made up the support bill. The former race was won by Robby Foley and Vin Barletta of Turner Motorsport, while Riley Dickinson swept the pair of Carrera Cup events.

=== Entries ===
A total of 53 cars took part in the event, split across five classes. 8 were entered in GTP, 8 in LMP2, 9 in LMP3, 8 in GTD Pro, and 20 in GTD.

In GTP, the field was reduced by one entry following the season-opening round. Cadillac Racing's second car, in accordance with the team's plan for the entry to conduct the 2023 FIA World Endurance Championship season, was removed. Wayne Taylor Racing, BMW M Team RLL, and Meyer Shank Racing also removed the fourth driver from their entries, being Brendon Hartley, Colton Herta, and Simon Pagenaud respectively. In LMP2, entries from Proton Competition and AF Corse did not return following Daytona, reducing the entry to eight cars. Nolan Siegel was also added to CrowdStrike Racing's entry.

In LMP3, Ave Motorsports made their season debut, competing with Seth Lucas, Trenton Estep, and Tõnis Kasemets. Jr III Racing, also making their season debut at Sebring, added Dakota Dickerson to their driver lineup of Ari Balogh and Garett Grist just weeks before the event, ensuring that the class runners-up from 2022 returned. Dickerson's place in the Andretti Autosport lineup was filled by Dutch driver Glenn van Berlo. Dan Goldburg joined the JDC-Miller MotorSports lineup, while Robert Mau was an addition to the Performance Tech Motorsports entry. Performance Tech finalized their entry with the addition of Tristan Nunez. FastMD Racing also did not continue their entry past Daytona. Late in the weekend, MRS-GT Racing removed their entry.

In GTD Pro, Risi Competizione added Stock Car Pro Series driver Gabriel Casagrande to their lineup, with the Brazilian making his first IMSA start since 2014, where he drove in the PC class for Performance Tech. Both Team TGM and MDK Motorsports also did not continue to field an entry at Sebring, with MDK scaling back their planned Endurance Cup campaign due to BoP concerns. Kyle Kirkwood and Franck Perera were added to the Vasser Sullivan Racing and Iron Lynx lineups, respectively. After initially committing to the Michelin Endurance Cup, SunEnergy1 Racing were also absent from the Sebring entry list, as were NTE Sport and the Iron Lynx #19. NTE Sport cited financial difficulties following their Daytona crash as the primary reason for their absence. Julien Andlauer was also added to the #92 Kelly-Moss lineup. Inception Racing, which competed with the McLaren 720S GT3 base model at Daytona, upgraded to the Evo specification for Sebring, giving the package its global race debut.

== Practice ==
There were four practice sessions preceding the start of the race on Saturday, three on Thursday and one on Friday. The first two 90 minute sessions were on Thursday morning and afternoon. The third held later that evening ran for 90 minutes; the fourth on Friday morning lasted 10 minutes.

In the first session, Filipe Albuquerque's No. 10 Acura lapped quickest at 1:48.303, 0.133 seconds ahead of CGR's Renger van der Zande. Jack Aitken was third in WER's No. 31 car. Connor De Phillippi and his teammate Augusto Farfus were fourth and fifth for BMW. The quickest LMP2 lap was set by Christian Rasmussen in Era Motorsport's Oreca. Dakota Dickerson led LMP3 in Jr III Racing's No. 30 Ligier. The GTD Pro class was topped by the No. 14 Vasser Sullivan Racing Lexus RC F GT3 of Jack Hawksworth while Trent Hindman set the fastest time amongst all GTD cars.

In the second session, Blomqvist's No. 60 MSR Acura lapped quickest at 1;47.049, 0.026 seconds ahead of Bourdais and WTR's Delétraz was third. Derani in the No. 31 Cadillac was fourth and Nasr's No. 7 Porsche was fifth. Rasmussen led LMP2 with a 1:50.506 lap in Era Motorsport's car, 0.767 seconds ahead of Nolan Siegel in CrowdStrike's No. 04 car. LMP3 was led by Jr III Racing's No. 30 Ligier, driven by Dickerson, with a 1:56.382 lap. Tommy Milner was fastest in GTD Pro while Russell Ward set the fastest time amongst all GTD cars.

The third session ran at night and saw Sims' No. 31 Cadillac set the fastest overall lap of 1 minute, 48.820 seconds. Tandy was 0.152 seconds behind in second, with the No. 10 WTR Acura of Louis Delétraz in third. Philipp Eng in the No. 24 BMW was fourth and Bourdais' No. 01 Cadillac was fifth. Pierson led LMP2 in TDS Racing's No. 35 car, 0.299 seconds ahead of Rasmussen in Era Motorsport's second-placed No. 18 entry. Garett Grist set the fastest time in LMP3. The GTD Pro class was topped by the No. 3 Corvette Racing Chevrolet Corvette C8.R GTD of Jordan Taylor while Indy Dontje was fastest in GTD.

Mathieu Jaminet led the final session in the No. 6 Penske Porsche with a lap of 1 minute, 47.086 seconds. Ricky Taylor's No. 10 Acura was second-fastest. The No. 31 Cadillac of Derani set the third-quickest lap. Blomqvist's No. 60 Acura, along with De Phillippi's No. 25 BMW were fourth and fifth. Fjordbach's No. 20 High Class Oreca led LMP2. LMP3 was led by Goldburg's No. 85 JDC Duqueine. The GTD Pro class was topped by the No. 62 Risi Competizione Ferrari 296 GT3 of Daniel Serra while Mikaël Grenier was fastest in GTD.

== Qualifying ==
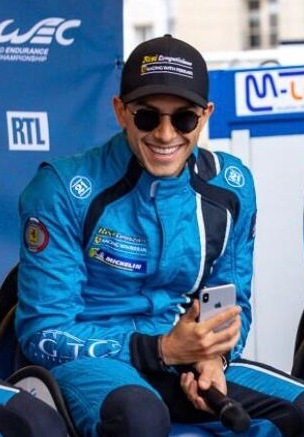
Pipo Derani (pictured in 2019) took the overall pole position for Whelen Engineering Racing.

Friday's morning qualifying was broken into three sessions, with one session for the GTP, LMP2 and LMP3, GTD Pro and GTD classes, which lasted for 20 minutes for the GTP session, and 15 minutes for the LMP2 and LMP3, and GTD Pro/GTD sessions. The rules dictated that all teams nominated a driver to qualify their cars, with the Pro-Am LMP2 class requiring a Bronze rated driver to qualify the car while the LMP3 class required a Bronze/Silver Rated driver to qualify the car. The competitors' fastest lap times determined the starting order. IMSA then arranged the grid to put GTPs ahead of the LMP2, LMP3, GTD Pro, and GTD cars.

The first was cars in the GTD Pro and GTD classes. Antonio García qualified on pole in GTD Pro driving the #3 Corvette Racing entry. Kyle Marcelli qualified on pole in GTD driving the #93 Racers Edge Motorsports with WTR entry, besting Philip Ellis in the #57 Winward Racing entry. The session saw one incident when Klaus Bachler, #9 Pfaff Motorsports entry, crashed at turn one. Bachler had his best two laps from the session deleted for causing a red flag, effectively leaving him with no time set.

The second session was for cars in the LMP2 and LMP3 classes. Ben Keating qualified on pole in LMP2 driving the No. 52 car for PR1/Mathiasen Motorsports, beating François Heriau driving the No. 35 TDS Racing entry by just over one tenth of a second. Glenn van Berlo qualified on pole in LMP3 driving the No. 36 car for Andretti Autosport.

The final session of qualifying was for the GTP class. Pipo Derani qualified on pole driving the No. 31 car for Whelen Engineering Racing, beating Sébastien Bourdais in the #01 Cadillac Racing entry by less than one tenth of a second. The session saw one incident when Matt Campbell, driving the #7 Porsche Penske Motorsport entry, crashed at turn one. Campbell had his best two laps from the session deleted for causing a red flag.

=== Qualifying results ===
Pole positions in each class are indicated in bold and by ‡.

Pos.	Class	No.	Team	Driver	Time	Gap	Grid
1	**GTP**	**31**	(United States) Whelen Engineering Racing	(Brazil) **Pipo Derani**	**1:45.836**	**_**	1‡
2	GTP	01	(United States) Cadillac Racing	(France) Sébastien Bourdais	1:45.923	+0.087	2
3	GTP	10	(United States) Wayne Taylor Racing with Andretti Autosport	(United States) Ricky Taylor	1:46.100	+0.264	3
4	GTP	6	(Germany) Porsche Penske Motorsport	(France) Mathieu Jaminet	1:46.426	+0.590	4
5	GTP	60	(United States) Meyer Shank Racing with Curb-Agajanian	(United Kingdom) Tom Blomqvist	1:46.603	+0.767	5
6	GTP	24	(United States) BMW M Team RLL	(Brazil) Augusto Farfus	1:46.756	+0.920	6
7	GTP	7	(Germany) Porsche Penske Motorsport	(Australia) Matt Campbell	1:46.851	+1.015	7 (Note: The #7 Porsche Penske Motorsport entry had its two fastest laps invalidated for causing a red flag.)
8	GTP	25	(United States) BMW M Team RLL	(United States) Connor De Phillippi	1:46.908	+1.072	8
9	**LMP2**	**52**	**(United States) PR1/Mathiasen Motorsports**	(United States) **Ben Keating**	**1:51.780**	**+5.944**	9‡
10	LMP2	35	(France) TDS Racing	(France) François Heriau	1:51.900	+6.064	10
11	LMP2	11	(France) TDS Racing	(United States) Steven Thomas	1:52.169	+6.333	11
12	LMP2	04	(United States) CrowdStrike Racing by APR	(United States) George Kurtz	1:52.486	+6.650	12
13	LMP2	20	(Denmark) High Class Racing	(Denmark) Dennis Andersen	1:53.350	+7.514	13
14	LMP2	8	(United States) Tower Motorsports	(Canada) John Farano	1:53.579	+7.743	14
15	LMP2	51	(United States) Rick Ware Racing	(United States) Eric Lux	1:53.673	+7.837	15
16	LMP2	18	(United States) Era Motorsport	(United States) Dwight Merriman	1:53.963	+8.127	16
17	**LMP3**	**36**	**(United States) Andretti Autosport**	(Netherlands) **Glenn van Berlo**	**1:55.215**	**+9.379**	17‡
18	LMP3	4	(United States) Ave Motorsports	(Estonia) Tõnis Kasemets	1:56.874	+11.038	25 (Note: The #4 Ave Motorsports entry started at the rear of the LMP3 class due to a technical infraction.)
19	LMP3	85	(United States) JDC-Miller MotorSports	(United States) Daniel Goldburg	1:56.984	+11.148	18
20	LMP3	74	(United States) Riley Motorsports	(United States) Gar Robinson	1:57.012	+11.176	19
21	LMP3	30	(United States) Jr III Motorsports	(United States) Ari Balogh	1:58.092	+12.256	20
22	LMP3	17	(Canada) AWA	(Canada) Anthony Mantella	1:58.164	+12.328	21
23	LMP3	38	(United States) Performance Tech Motorsports	(United States) Christopher Allen	1:58.724	+12.888	22
24	LMP3	13	(Canada) AWA	(Canada) Orey Fidani	1:59.160	+13.324	23
25	**GTD Pro**	**3**	**(United States) Corvette Racing**	(Spain) **Antonio García**	**1:59.315**	**+13.479**	26‡
26	LMP3	33	(United States) Sean Creech Motorsport	(United States) Lance Willsey	1:59.458	+13.622	24
27	GTD Pro	14	(United States) Vasser Sullivan Racing	(United Kingdom) Jack Hawksworth	1:59.582	+13.746	27
28	GTD Pro	79	(United States) WeatherTech Racing	(Spain) Daniel Juncadella	1:59.635	+13.799	52 (Note: The #79 WeatherTech Racing entry started at the rear of the GTD Pro class due to a technical infraction.)
29	**GTD**	**93**	**(United States) Racers Edge Motorsports with WTR Andretti**	(Canada) **Kyle Marcelli**	**1:59.714**	**+13.878**	28‡
30	GTD	57	(United States) Winward Racing	(Switzerland) Philip Ellis	1:59.834	+13.998	53 (Note: The #57 Winward Racing entry started at the rear of the GTD class due to a technical infraction.)
31	GTD Pro	23	(United States) Heart of Racing Team	(Spain) Alex Riberas	1:59.925	+14.089	29
32	GTD Pro	62	(United States) Risi Competizione	(Spain) Daniel Serra	1:59.939	+14.103	30
33	GTD	12	(United States) Vasser Sullivan Racing	(United States) Aaron Telitz	1:59.944	+14.108	31
34	GTD	16	(United States) Wright Motorsports	(Belgium) Jan Heylen	2:00.022	+14.186	32
35	GTD	023	(United States) Triarsi Competizione	(Italy) Alessio Rovera	2:00.124	+14.288	33
36	GTD	1	(United States) Paul Miller Racing	(United States) Madison Snow	2:00.229	+14.393	34
37	GTD	96	(United States) Turner Motorsport	(United States) Patrick Gallagher	2:00.504	+14.668	35
38	GTD	78	(United States) Forte Racing Powered by US RaceTronics	(Italy) Loris Spinelli	2:00.639	+14.803	36
39	GTD Pro	63	(Italy) Iron Lynx	(France) Franck Perera	2:00.763	+14.927	37
40	GTD	70	(United Kingdom) Inception Racing	(United States) Brendan Iribe	2:01.395	+15.559	38
41	GTD	47	(Italy) Cetilar Racing	(Italy) Giorgio Sernagiotto	2:01.451	+15.615	39
42	GTD	21	(Italy) AF Corse	(United Kingdom) Simon Mann	2:01.588	+15.752	40
43	GTD	83	(Italy) Iron Dames	(Denmark) Michelle Gatting	2:01.652	+15.816	41
44	GTD	27	(United States) Heart of Racing Team	(United Kingdom) Ian James	2:01.652	+15.816	46 (Note: The #27 Heart of Racing Team entry started at the rear of the GTD class after deciding to change their starting race tires.)
45	GTD	91	(United States) Kelly-Moss w/ Riley	(United States) Alan Metni	2:01.927	+16.091	48 (Note: The #91 Kelly-Moss with Riley entry started at the rear of the GTD class after deciding to change their starting race tires.)
46	GTD	44	(United States) Magnus Racing	(United States) John Potter	2:02.115	+16.279	42
47	GTD	77	(United States) Wright Motorsports	(United States) Alan Brynjolfsson	2:02.612	+16.776	43
48	GTD	80	(United States) AO Racing Team	(United States) P. J. Hyett	2:02.678	+16.842	44
49	GTD	66	(United States) Gradient Racing	(United States) Sheena Monk	2:03.342	+17.506	45
50	GTD	92	(United States) Kelly-Moss w/ Riley	(United States) David Brule	2:04.555	+18.719	47 (Note: The #92 Kelly-Moss with Riley entry started at the rear of the GTD class after deciding to change their starting race tires.)
—	GTD Pro	9	(Canada) Pfaff Motorsports	No Time Set			49 (Note: The #9 Pfaff Motorsports entry had its two fastest laps invalidated for causing a red flag.)
—	GTD Pro	95	(United States) Turner Motorsport	Time Disallowed			50 (Note: The #95 Turner Motorsport entry had its lap times invalidated after the driver exited the car before the end of the qualifying session.)
—	GTD	32	(United States) Team Korthoff Motorsports	Time Disallowed			51 (Note: The #32 Team Korthoff Motorsports entry had its lap times invalidated after the driver exited the car before the end of the qualifying session.)
QUALIFYING RESULTS STARTING GRID

== Warm-Up ==
A 20-minute warm-up session was held on the morning on March 18. Jaminet lapped fastest with a time of 1 minute, 48.398 seconds. Mikkel Jensen led LMP2 while Goldburg led LMP3. The fastest GTD Pro lap set by Jordan Taylor in the No. 3 Corvette, and Antonio Fuoco's No. 47 Ferrari set the fastest time amongst all GTD cars.

== Race ==
=== Start and early hours ===
Weather conditions at the start were dry and clear. The air temperature throughout the race was between 78.2 and 88.3 °F (25.7 and 31.3 °C) and the track temperature ranged from 75.0 to 87.0 °F (23.9 to 30.6 °C). A chance of rain was in the forecast in the evening of March 18. The race began at 10:10 am Eastern Standard Time (UTC−5:00). Ricky Taylor got a great start and passed Bourdais for second on the first lap. Lance Willsey's No. 33 Sean Creech Motorsport Ligier crashed at turn one and suffered front end damage. Debris from the car necessitated the first full course caution for eight minutes. When racing resumed, Brendan Iribe spun at turn five after making contact with Michelle Gatting's No. 83 Lamborghini while Dwight Merriman spun at turn seven after making contact with Eric Lux's No. 51 LMP2 car. Merriman would be given a drive-through penalty for incident responsibility. Willsey received a stop plus 60 for pitting for emergency service while the pits were closing during the full course caution period. Dennis Andersen spun at turn thirteen while lapping the GTD field. Heriau passed Keating at turn seventeen for the lead in LMP2 on lap 24.

Bourdais jumped Derani to take the lead overall after the first pit stop cycle. Keating retook the lead of LMP2 after Heriau picked up a drive-through penalty for speeding in the pits. The second full course caution was issued when Kurtz's No. 04 LMP2 car spun at turn seven and got stuck on the curbs. Anthony Mantella's No. 17 AWA Duqueine ran out of fuel. After 25 minutes of caution, racing resumed.

== Post-race ==
As a result of winning the race, Derani, Sims, and Aitken advanced from fourth to first in the GTP Drivers' Championship while De Phillippi, Yelloly, and van der Linde jumped from eighth to fourth. Since it was the season's first points paying race, Farano, McLaughlin, and Simpson led the LMP2 Drivers' Championship with 375 points. Since it was the season's first points paying race, Burdon, Fraga, and Robinson led the LMP3 Drivers' Championship with 380 points. The result kept Gounon, Juncadella, and Engel atop the GTD Pro Drivers' Championship. In GTD, Iribe, Millroy, and Schandorff advanced from third to first in the Drivers' Championship. Lewis, Sellers, and Snow jumped from eighth to second while De Angelis, Sørensen, and James dropped from first to fifth. Cadillac and McLaren took the lead in their respective Manufacturers' Championships while Mercedes-AMG continued to top the GTD Pro Manufacturers' Championship. WeatherTech Racing continued to top the GTD Pro Teams' Championship while Whelen Engineering Racing, and Inception Racing took the lead in their respective Teams' Championships with nine races remaining in the season. Tower Motorsports and Riley Motorsports became the leaders of their respective class Teams' Championships.

=== Race results ===
Class winners are denoted in bold and with ‡.

Pos	Class	No.	Team / Entrant	Drivers	Chassis	Laps	Time/Retired
Pos	Class	No.	Team / Entrant	Drivers	Engine	Laps	Time/Retired
1	**GTP**	**31**	**(United States) Whelen Engineering Racing**	**(United Kingdom) Jack Aitken (Brazil) Pipo Derani (United Kingdom) Alexander Sims**	**Cadillac V-Series.R**	**322**	**12:00:53.382‡**
1	**GTP**	**31**	**(United States) Whelen Engineering Racing**	**(United Kingdom) Jack Aitken (Brazil) Pipo Derani (United Kingdom) Alexander Sims**	**Cadillac LMC55R 5.5 L V8**	**322**	**12:00:53.382‡**
2	GTP	25	(United States) BMW M Team RLL	(United States) Connor De Phillippi (South Africa) Sheldon van der Linde (United Kingdom) Nick Yelloly	BMW M Hybrid V8	322	+2.940
2	GTP	25	(United States) BMW M Team RLL	(United States) Connor De Phillippi (South Africa) Sheldon van der Linde (United Kingdom) Nick Yelloly	BMW P66/3 4.0 L Turbo V8	322	+2.940
3	**LMP2**	**8**	**(United States) Tower Motorsports**	**(Canada) John Farano (New Zealand) Scott McLaughlin (Barbados) Kyffin Simpson**	**Oreca 07**	**318**	**+4 Laps‡**
3	**LMP2**	**8**	**(United States) Tower Motorsports**	**(Canada) John Farano (New Zealand) Scott McLaughlin (Barbados) Kyffin Simpson**	**Gibson GK428 4.2 L V8**	**318**	**+4 Laps‡**
4	LMP2	11	(France) TDS Racing	(United States) Scott Huffaker (Denmark) Mikkel Jensen (United States) Steven Thomas	Oreca 07	318	+4 Laps
4	LMP2	11	(France) TDS Racing	(United States) Scott Huffaker (Denmark) Mikkel Jensen (United States) Steven Thomas	Gibson GK428 4.2 L V8	318	+4 Laps
5	LMP2	18	(United States) Era Motorsport	(United Kingdom) Ryan Dalziel (United States) Dwight Merriman (Denmark) Christian Rasmussen	Oreca 07	318	+4 Laps
5	LMP2	18	(United States) Era Motorsport	(United Kingdom) Ryan Dalziel (United States) Dwight Merriman (Denmark) Christian Rasmussen	Gibson GK428 4.2 L V8	318	+4 Laps
6	LMP2	52	(United States) PR1/Mathiasen Motorsports	(France) Paul-Loup Chatin (United States) Ben Keating (United Kingdom) Alex Quinn	Oreca 07	318	+4 Laps
6	LMP2	52	(United States) PR1/Mathiasen Motorsports	(France) Paul-Loup Chatin (United States) Ben Keating (United Kingdom) Alex Quinn	Gibson GK428 4.2 L V8	318	+4 Laps
7	LMP2	04	(United States) CrowdStrike Racing by APR	(United Kingdom) Ben Hanley (United States) George Kurtz (United States) Nolan Siegel	Oreca 07	318	+4 Laps
7	LMP2	04	(United States) CrowdStrike Racing by APR	(United Kingdom) Ben Hanley (United States) George Kurtz (United States) Nolan Siegel	Gibson GK428 4.2 L V8	318	+4 Laps
8	LMP2	20	(Denmark) High Class Racing	(Denmark) Dennis Andersen (Denmark) Anders Fjordbach (United Arab Emirates) Ed Jones	Oreca 07	317	+5 Laps
8	LMP2	20	(Denmark) High Class Racing	(Denmark) Dennis Andersen (Denmark) Anders Fjordbach (United Arab Emirates) Ed Jones	Gibson GK428 4.2 L V8	317	+5 Laps
9 DNF	GTP	6	(Germany) Porsche Penske Motorsport	(United States) Dane Cameron (France) Mathieu Jaminet (United Kingdom) Nick Tandy	Porsche 963	315	Accident
9 DNF	GTP	6	(Germany) Porsche Penske Motorsport	(United States) Dane Cameron (France) Mathieu Jaminet (United Kingdom) Nick Tandy	Porsche 9RD 4.6 L Turbo V8	315	Accident
10 DNF	GTP	10	(United States) Wayne Taylor Racing w/ Andretti Autosport	(Portugal) Filipe Albuquerque (Switzerland) Louis Delétraz (United States) Ricky Taylor	Acura ARX-06	315	Accident
10 DNF	GTP	10	(United States) Wayne Taylor Racing w/ Andretti Autosport	(Portugal) Filipe Albuquerque (Switzerland) Louis Delétraz (United States) Ricky Taylor	Acura AR24e 2.4 L Turbo V6	315	Accident
11 DNF	GTP	7	(Germany) Porsche Penske Motorsport	(Australia) Matt Campbell (Denmark) Michael Christensen (Brazil) Felipe Nasr	Porsche 963	315	Accident
11 DNF	GTP	7	(Germany) Porsche Penske Motorsport	(Australia) Matt Campbell (Denmark) Michael Christensen (Brazil) Felipe Nasr	Porsche 9RD 4.6 L Turbo V8	315	Accident
12	**LMP3**	**74**	**(United States) Riley Motorsports**	**(Australia) Josh Burdon (Brazil) Felipe Fraga (United States) Gar Robinson**	**Ligier JS P320**	**309**	**+13 Laps‡**
12	**LMP3**	**74**	**(United States) Riley Motorsports**	**(Australia) Josh Burdon (Brazil) Felipe Fraga (United States) Gar Robinson**	**Nissan VK56DE 5.6 L V8**	**309**	**+13 Laps‡**
13	LMP3	13	(Canada) AWA	(United Kingdom) Matt Bell (Canada) Orey Fidani (Germany) Lars Kern	Duqueine M30 - D08	308	+14 Laps
13	LMP3	13	(Canada) AWA	(United Kingdom) Matt Bell (Canada) Orey Fidani (Germany) Lars Kern	Nissan VK56DE 5.6 L V8	308	+14 Laps
14	LMP3	85	(United States) JDC-Miller MotorSports	(United Kingdom) Till Bechtolsheimer (United States) Dan Goldberg (Netherlands) Tijmen van der Helm	Duqueine M30 - D08	308	+14 Laps
14	LMP3	85	(United States) JDC-Miller MotorSports	(United Kingdom) Till Bechtolsheimer (United States) Dan Goldberg (Netherlands) Tijmen van der Helm	Nissan VK56DE 5.6 L V8	308	+14 Laps
15	LMP3	17	(Canada) AWA	(United Kingdom) Wayne Boyd (Canada) Anthony Mantella (Argentina) Nicolás Varrone	Duqueine M30 - D08	307	+15 Laps
15	LMP3	17	(Canada) AWA	(United Kingdom) Wayne Boyd (Canada) Anthony Mantella (Argentina) Nicolás Varrone	Nissan VK56DE 5.6 L V8	307	+15 Laps
16	LMP3	4	(United States) Ave Motorsports	(United States) Trenton Estep (Estonia) Tõnis Kasemets (United States) Seth Lucas	Ligier JS P320	306	+16 Laps
16	LMP3	4	(United States) Ave Motorsports	(United States) Trenton Estep (Estonia) Tõnis Kasemets (United States) Seth Lucas	Nissan VK56DE 5.6 L V8	306	+16 Laps
17	**GTD Pro**	**9**	**(Canada) Pfaff Motorsports**	**(Austria) Klaus Bachler (France) Patrick Pilet (Belgium) Laurens Vanthoor**	**Porsche 911 GT3 R (992)**	**303**	**+19 Laps‡**
17	**GTD Pro**	**9**	**(Canada) Pfaff Motorsports**	**(Austria) Klaus Bachler (France) Patrick Pilet (Belgium) Laurens Vanthoor**	**Porsche 4.2 L Flat-6**	**303**	**+19 Laps‡**
18	GTD Pro	14	(United States) Vasser Sullivan Racing	(United Kingdom) Ben Barnicoat (United Kingdom) Jack Hawksworth (United States) Kyle Kirkwood	Lexus RC F GT3	303	+19 Laps
18	GTD Pro	14	(United States) Vasser Sullivan Racing	(United Kingdom) Ben Barnicoat (United Kingdom) Jack Hawksworth (United States) Kyle Kirkwood	Toyota 2UR 5.0 L V8	303	+19 Laps
19	GTD Pro	79	(United States) WeatherTech Racing	(Germany) Maro Engel (Andorra) Jules Gounon (Spain) Daniel Juncadella	Mercedes-AMG GT3 Evo	303	+19 Laps
19	GTD Pro	79	(United States) WeatherTech Racing	(Germany) Maro Engel (Andorra) Jules Gounon (Spain) Daniel Juncadella	Mercedes-AMG M159 6.2 L V8	303	+19 Laps
20	GTD Pro	63	(Italy) Iron Lynx	(France) Romain Grosjean (South Africa) Jordan Pepper (France) Franck Perera	Lamborghini Huracán GT3 Evo 2	303	+19 Laps
20	GTD Pro	63	(Italy) Iron Lynx	(France) Romain Grosjean (South Africa) Jordan Pepper (France) Franck Perera	Lamborghini 5.2 L V10	303	+19 Laps
21	GTD Pro	3	(United States) Corvette Racing	(Spain) Antonio García (United States) Tommy Milner (United States) Jordan Taylor	Chevrolet Corvette C8.R GTD	303	+19 Laps
21	GTD Pro	3	(United States) Corvette Racing	(Spain) Antonio García (United States) Tommy Milner (United States) Jordan Taylor	Chevrolet 5.5 L V8	303	+19 Laps
22	GTD Pro	62	(United States) Risi Competizione	(Brazil) Gabriel Casagrande (Italy) Davide Rigon (Brazil) Daniel Serra	Ferrari 296 GT3	303	+19 Laps
22	GTD Pro	62	(United States) Risi Competizione	(Brazil) Gabriel Casagrande (Italy) Davide Rigon (Brazil) Daniel Serra	Ferrari 3.0 L Turbo V6	303	+19 Laps
23	GTD Pro	95	(United States) Turner Motorsport	(United States) Bill Auberlen (United States) Chandler Hull (United States) John Edwards	BMW M4 GT3	302	+20 Laps
23	GTD Pro	95	(United States) Turner Motorsport	(United States) Bill Auberlen (United States) Chandler Hull (United States) John Edwards	BMW SS58B30T0 3.0 L Turbo I6	302	+20 Laps
24	GTP	60	(United States) Meyer Shank Racing w/ Curb-Agajanian	(United Kingdom) Tom Blomqvist (United States) Colin Braun (Brazil) Hélio Castroneves	Acura ARX-06	301	+21 Laps
24	GTP	60	(United States) Meyer Shank Racing w/ Curb-Agajanian	(United Kingdom) Tom Blomqvist (United States) Colin Braun (Brazil) Hélio Castroneves	Acura AR24e 2.4 L Turbo V6	301	+21 Laps
25	**GTD**	**1**	**(United States) Paul Miller Racing**	**(United States) Corey Lewis (United States) Bryan Sellers (United States) Madison Snow**	**BMW M4 GT3**	**301**	**+21 Laps‡**
25	**GTD**	**1**	**(United States) Paul Miller Racing**	**(United States) Corey Lewis (United States) Bryan Sellers (United States) Madison Snow**	**BMW SS58B30T0 3.0 L Turbo I6**	**301**	**+21 Laps‡**
26	GTD	96	(United States) Turner Motorsport	(United States) Michael Dinan (United States) Robby Foley (United States) Patrick Gallagher	BMW M4 GT3	301	+21 Laps
26	GTD	96	(United States) Turner Motorsport	(United States) Michael Dinan (United States) Robby Foley (United States) Patrick Gallagher	BMW SS58B30T0 3.0 L Turbo I6	301	+21 Laps
27	GTD	92	(United States) Kelly-Moss w/ Riley	(France) Julien Andlauer (United States) David Brule (United States) Alec Udell	Porsche 911 GT3 R (992)	301	+21 Laps
27	GTD	92	(United States) Kelly-Moss w/ Riley	(France) Julien Andlauer (United States) David Brule (United States) Alec Udell	Porsche 4.2 L Flat-6	301	+21 Laps
28	GTD	70	(United Kingdom) Inception Racing	(United States) Brendan Iribe (United Kingdom) Ollie Millroy (Denmark) Frederik Schandorff	McLaren 720S GT3 Evo	301	+21 Laps
28	GTD	70	(United Kingdom) Inception Racing	(United States) Brendan Iribe (United Kingdom) Ollie Millroy (Denmark) Frederik Schandorff	McLaren M840T 4.0 L Turbo V8	301	+21 Laps
29	GTD	12	(United States) Vasser Sullivan Racing	(United States) Frankie Montecalvo (United States) Aaron Telitz (Canada) Parker Thompson	Lexus RC F GT3	301	+21 Laps
29	GTD	12	(United States) Vasser Sullivan Racing	(United States) Frankie Montecalvo (United States) Aaron Telitz (Canada) Parker Thompson	Toyota 2UR 5.0 L V8	301	+21 Laps
30	GTD	16	(United States) Wright Motorsports	(United States) Ryan Hardwick (Belgium) Jan Heylen (Canada) Zacharie Robichon	Porsche 911 GT3 R (992)	301	+21 Laps
30	GTD	16	(United States) Wright Motorsports	(United States) Ryan Hardwick (Belgium) Jan Heylen (Canada) Zacharie Robichon	Porsche 4.2 L Flat-6	301	+21 Laps
31	GTD	91	(United States) Kelly-Moss w/ Riley	(New Zealand) Jaxon Evans (United States) Alan Metni (Netherlands) Kay van Berlo	Porsche 911 GT3 R (992)	301	+21 Laps
31	GTD	91	(United States) Kelly-Moss w/ Riley	(New Zealand) Jaxon Evans (United States) Alan Metni (Netherlands) Kay van Berlo	Porsche 4.2 L Flat-6	301	+21 Laps
32	GTD	77	(United States) Wright Motorsports	(United States) Alan Brynjolfsson (United States) Trent Hindman (United States) Max Root	Porsche 911 GT3 R (992)	301	+21 Laps
32	GTD	77	(United States) Wright Motorsports	(United States) Alan Brynjolfsson (United States) Trent Hindman (United States) Max Root	Porsche 4.2 L Flat-6	301	+21 Laps
33	GTD	44	(United States) Magnus Racing	(United States) Andy Lally (United States) John Potter (United States) Spencer Pumpelly	Aston Martin Vantage AMR GT3	301	+21 Laps
33	GTD	44	(United States) Magnus Racing	(United States) Andy Lally (United States) John Potter (United States) Spencer Pumpelly	Aston Martin 4.0 L Turbo V8	301	+21 Laps
34	GTD	32	(United States) Team Korthoff Motorsports	(Canada) Mikaël Grenier (United States) Kenton Koch (United States) Mike Skeen	Mercedes-AMG GT3 Evo	301	+21 Laps
34	GTD	32	(United States) Team Korthoff Motorsports	(Canada) Mikaël Grenier (United States) Kenton Koch (United States) Mike Skeen	Mercedes-AMG M159 6.2 L V8	301	+21 Laps
35	GTD	83	(Italy) Iron Dames	(Belgium) Sarah Bovy (Switzerland) Rahel Frey (Denmark) Michelle Gatting	Lamborghini Huracán GT3 Evo 2	300	+22 Laps
35	GTD	83	(Italy) Iron Dames	(Belgium) Sarah Bovy (Switzerland) Rahel Frey (Denmark) Michelle Gatting	Lamborghini 5.2 L V10	300	+22 Laps
36	GTD	66	(United States) Gradient Racing	(United Kingdom) Katherine Legge (United States) Marc Miller (United States) Sheena Monk	Acura NSX GT3 Evo22	298	+24 Laps
36	GTD	66	(United States) Gradient Racing	(United Kingdom) Katherine Legge (United States) Marc Miller (United States) Sheena Monk	Acura 3.5 L Turbo V6	298	+24 Laps
37	GTD Pro	23	(United States) Heart of Racing Team	(United Kingdom) Ross Gunn (United Kingdom) David Pittard (Spain) Alex Riberas	Aston Martin Vantage AMR GT3	297	+25 Laps
37	GTD Pro	23	(United States) Heart of Racing Team	(United Kingdom) Ross Gunn (United Kingdom) David Pittard (Spain) Alex Riberas	Aston Martin 4.0 L Turbo V8	297	+25 Laps
38	GTD	21	(Italy) AF Corse	(Italy) Francesco Castellacci (United Kingdom) Simon Mann (Spain) Miguel Molina	Ferrari 296 GT3	294	+28 Laps
38	GTD	21	(Italy) AF Corse	(Italy) Francesco Castellacci (United Kingdom) Simon Mann (Spain) Miguel Molina	Ferrari 3.0 L Turbo V6	294	+28 Laps
39	LMP3	38	(United States) Performance Tech Motorsports	(United States) Christopher Allen (United States) Robert Mau (United States) Tristan Nunez	Ligier JS P320	293	+29 Laps
39	LMP3	38	(United States) Performance Tech Motorsports	(United States) Christopher Allen (United States) Robert Mau (United States) Tristan Nunez	Nissan VK56DE 5.6 L V8	293	+29 Laps
40	GTD	47	(Italy) Cetilar Racing	(Italy) Antonio Fuoco (Italy) Roberto Lacorte (Italy) Giorgio Sernagiotto	Ferrari 296 GT3	290	+32 Laps
40	GTD	47	(Italy) Cetilar Racing	(Italy) Antonio Fuoco (Italy) Roberto Lacorte (Italy) Giorgio Sernagiotto	Ferrari 3.0 L Turbo V6	290	+32 Laps
41 DNF	LMP2	51	(United States) Rick Ware Racing	(Canada) Devlin DeFrancesco (Brazil) Pietro Fittipaldi (United States) Eric Lux	Oreca 07	289	Accident
41 DNF	LMP2	51	(United States) Rick Ware Racing	(Canada) Devlin DeFrancesco (Brazil) Pietro Fittipaldi (United States) Eric Lux	Gibson GK428 4.2 L V8	289	Accident
42 DNF	GTD	27	(United States) Heart of Racing Team	(Canada) Roman De Angelis (United Kingdom) Ian James (Denmark) Marco Sørensen	Aston Martin Vantage AMR GT3	287	Accident
42 DNF	GTD	27	(United States) Heart of Racing Team	(Canada) Roman De Angelis (United Kingdom) Ian James (Denmark) Marco Sørensen	Aston Martin 4.0 L Turbo V8	287	Accident
43	GTD	80	(United States) AO Racing Team	(United States) P. J. Hyett (United States) Gunnar Jeannette (United Kingdom) Sebastian Priaulx	Porsche 911 GT3 R (992)	285	+37 Laps
43	GTD	80	(United States) AO Racing Team	(United States) P. J. Hyett (United States) Gunnar Jeannette (United Kingdom) Sebastian Priaulx	Porsche 4.2 L Flat-6	285	+37 Laps
44	LMP3	33	(United States) Sean Creech Motorsports	(Portugal) João Barbosa (Chile) Nico Pino (United States) Lance Willsey	Ligier JS P320	283	+39 Laps
44	LMP3	33	(United States) Sean Creech Motorsports	(Portugal) João Barbosa (Chile) Nico Pino (United States) Lance Willsey	Nissan VK56DE 5.6 L V8	283	+39 Laps
45 DNF	LMP3	30	(United States) Jr III Racing	(United States) Ari Balogh (United States) Dakota Dickerson (Canada) Garett Grist	Ligier JS P320	282	Accident
45 DNF	LMP3	30	(United States) Jr III Racing	(United States) Ari Balogh (United States) Dakota Dickerson (Canada) Garett Grist	Nissan VK56DE 5.6 L V8	282	Accident
46 DNF	GTD	78	(United States) Forte Racing Powered by US RaceTronics	(Canada) Misha Goikhberg (Chile) Benjamín Hites (Italy) Loris Spinelli	Lamborghini Huracán GT3 Evo 2	279	Accident
46 DNF	GTD	78	(United States) Forte Racing Powered by US RaceTronics	(Canada) Misha Goikhberg (Chile) Benjamín Hites (Italy) Loris Spinelli	Lamborghini 5.2 L V10	279	Accident
47 DNF	GTP	01	(United States) Cadillac Racing	(France) Sébastien Bourdais (New Zealand) Scott Dixon (Netherlands) Renger van der Zande	Cadillac V-Series.R	241	Fire
47 DNF	GTP	01	(United States) Cadillac Racing	(France) Sébastien Bourdais (New Zealand) Scott Dixon (Netherlands) Renger van der Zande	Cadillac LMC55R 5.5 L V8	241	Fire
48 DNF	LMP3	36	(United States) Andretti Autosport	(United States) Jarett Andretti (Colombia) Gabby Chaves (Netherlands) Glenn van Berlo	Ligier JS P320	230	Engine
48 DNF	LMP3	36	(United States) Andretti Autosport	(United States) Jarett Andretti (Colombia) Gabby Chaves (Netherlands) Glenn van Berlo	Nissan VK56DE 5.6 L V8	230	Engine
49 DNF	GTD	57	(United States) Winward Racing	(Netherlands) Indy Dontje (United Kingdom) Philip Ellis (United States) Russell Ward	Mercedes-AMG GT3 Evo	198	Accident
49 DNF	GTD	57	(United States) Winward Racing	(Netherlands) Indy Dontje (United Kingdom) Philip Ellis (United States) Russell Ward	Mercedes-AMG M159 6.2 L V8	198	Accident
50 DNF	GTD	93	(United States) Racers Edge Motorsports with WTR Andretti	(Costa Rica) Danny Formal (United States) Ashton Harrison (Canada) Kyle Marcelli	Acura NSX GT3 Evo22	186	Collision
50 DNF	GTD	93	(United States) Racers Edge Motorsports with WTR Andretti	(Costa Rica) Danny Formal (United States) Ashton Harrison (Canada) Kyle Marcelli	Acura 3.5 L Turbo V6	186	Collision
51 DNF	GTP	24	(United States) BMW M Team RLL	(Austria) Philipp Eng (Brazil) Augusto Farfus (Germany) Marco Wittmann	BMW M Hybrid V8	172	Overheating
51 DNF	GTP	24	(United States) BMW M Team RLL	(Austria) Philipp Eng (Brazil) Augusto Farfus (Germany) Marco Wittmann	BMW P66/3 4.0 L Turbo V8	172	Overheating
52 DNF	LMP2	35	(France) TDS Racing	(France) François Heriau (United States) Josh Pierson (Netherlands) Giedo van der Garde	Oreca 07	132	Accident
52 DNF	LMP2	35	(France) TDS Racing	(France) François Heriau (United States) Josh Pierson (Netherlands) Giedo van der Garde	Gibson GK428 4.2 L V8	132	Accident
53 DNF	GTD	023	(United States) Triarsi Competizione	(Italy) Alessio Rovera (United States) Charlie Scardina (United States) Onofrio Triarsi	Ferrari 296 GT3	95	Alternator
53 DNF	GTD	023	(United States) Triarsi Competizione	(Italy) Alessio Rovera (United States) Charlie Scardina (United States) Onofrio Triarsi	Ferrari 3.0 L Turbo V6	95	Alternator

== Standings after the race ==
GTP Drivers' Championship standings
Pos.	+/–	Driver	Points
1	3	(Brazil) Pipo Derani (United Kingdom) Alexander Sims (United Kingdom) Jack Aitken	670
2	1	(Portugal) Filipe Albuquerque (United States) Ricky Taylor (Switzerland) Louis Delétraz	660
3	1	(France) Sébastien Bourdais (Netherlands) Renger van der Zande (New Zealand) Scott Dixon	600
4	4	(United States) Connor De Phillippi (United Kingdom) Nick Yelloly (South Africa) Sheldon van der Linde	586
5	2	(United Kingdom) Nick Tandy (France) Mathieu Jaminet (United States) Dane Cameron	580

LMP2 Drivers' Championship standings
Pos.	Driver	Points
1	(Canada) John Farano (New Zealand) Scott McLaughlin (Barbados) Kyffin Simpson	375
2	(United States) Scott Huffaker (Denmark) Mikkel Jensen (United States) Steven Thomas	350
3	(United Kingdom) Ryan Dalziel (United States) Dwight Merriman (Denmark) Christian Rasmussen	323
4	(France) Paul-Loup Chatin (United States) Ben Keating (United Kingdom) Alex Quinn	315
5	(United Kingdom) Ben Hanley (United States) George Kurtz	288

LMP3 Drivers' Championship standings
Pos.	Driver	Points
1	(Australia) Josh Burdon (Brazil) Felipe Fraga (United States) Gar Robinson	380
2	(United Kingdom) Matt Bell (Canada) Orey Fidani (Germany) Lars Kern	344
3	(United Kingdom) Till Bechtolsheimer (Netherlands) Tijmen van der Helm	332
4	(United States) Daniel Goldburg	332
5	(United Kingdom) Wayne Boyd (Canada) Anthony Mantella (Argentina) Nicolás Varrone	306

GTD Pro Drivers' Championship standings
Pos.	+/–	Driver	Points
1		(Andorra) Jules Gounon (Spain) Daniel Juncadella (Germany) Maro Engel	708
2	1	(United Kingdom) Ben Barnicoat (United Kingdom) Jack Hawksworth	682
3	2	(Austria) Klaus Bachler (France) Patrick Pilet (Belgium) Laurens Vanthoor	659
4	2	(Spain) Antonio García (United States) Jordan Taylor (United States) Tommy Milner	643
5	1	(France) Romain Grosjean (South Africa) Jordan Pepper	612

GTD Drivers' Championship standings
Pos.	+/–	Driver	Points
1	2	(United States) Brendan Iribe (United Kingdom) Ollie Millroy (Denmark) Frederik Schandorff	629
2	6	(United States) Corey Lewis (United States) Bryan Sellers (United States) Madison Snow	628
3	2	(United States) Andy Lally (United States) John Potter (United States) Spencer Pumpelly	577
4	1	(United States) Aaron Telitz (United States) Frankie Montecalvo (Canada) Parker Thompson	576
5	4	(Canada) Roman De Angelis (Denmark) Marco Sørensen (United Kingdom) Ian James	554

- Note: Only the top five positions are included for all sets of standings.

GTP Teams' Championship standings
Pos.	+/–	Team	Points
1	3	(United States) #31 Whelen Engineering Racing	670
2	1	(United States) #10 WTR with Andretti Autosport	660
3	1	(United States) #01 Cadillac Racing	600
4	4	(United States) #25 BMW M Team RLL	586
5	2	(Germany) #6 Porsche Penske Motorsport	580

LMP2 Teams' Championship standings
Pos.	Team	Points
1	(United States) #8 Tower Motorsports	375
2	(France) #11 TDS Racing	350
3	(United States) #18 Era Motorsport	323
4	(United States) #52 PR1/Mathiasen Motorsports	315
5	(United States) #04 CrowdStrike Racing by APR	260

LMP3 Teams' Championship standings
Pos.	Team	Points
1	(United States) #74 Riley Motorsports	380
2	(Canada) #13 AWA	344
3	(United States) #85 JDC-Miller MotorSports	332
4	(Canada) #17 AWA	306
5	(United States) #4 Ave Motorsports	282

GTD Pro Teams' Championship standings
Pos.	+/–	Team	Points
1		(United States) #79 WeatherTech Racing	708
2	1	(United States) #14 Vasser Sullivan Racing	682
3	2	(Canada) #9 Pfaff Motorsports	659
4	2	(United States) #3 Corvette Racing	643
5	1	(Italy) #63 Iron Lynx	612

GTD Teams' Championship standings
Pos.	+/–	Team	Points
1	2	(United Kingdom) #70 Inception Racing	629
2	6	(United States) #1 Paul Miller Racing	628
3	1	(United States) #44 Magnus Racing	577
4	1	(United States) #12 Vasser Sullivan Racing	576
5	4	(United States) #27 Heart of Racing Team	554

- Note: Only the top five positions are included for all sets of standings.

GTP Manufacturers' Championship standings
Pos.	+/–	Manufacturer	Points
1	1	(United States) Cadillac	735
2	1	(Japan) Acura	697
3		(Germany) BMW	676
4		(Germany) Porsche	642

GTD Pro Manufacturers' Championship standings
Pos.	+/–	Manufacturer	Points
1		(Germany) Mercedes-AMG	708
2	1	(Japan) Lexus	682
3	2	(Germany) Porsche	659
4	2	(United States) Chevrolet	643
5	1	(Italy) Lamborghini	612

GTD Manufacturers' Championship standings
Pos.	+/–	Manufacturer	Points
1	1	(United Kingdom) McLaren	674
2	1	(United Kingdom) Aston Martin	661
3	3	(Germany) BMW	650
4		(Japan) Lexus	618
5	2	(Germany) Porsche	613

- Note: Only the top five positions are included for all sets of standings.

IMSA SportsCar Championship
Previous race: 2023 24 Hours of Daytona	2023 season	Next race: 2023 Grand Prix of Long Beach
