= IMSA GT3 Cup Challenge =

One-make racing series featuring the Porsche 911 GT3

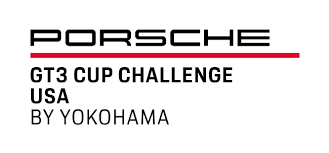
- Category: One-make racing by Porsche
- Country: United States
- Inaugural season: 2005
- Folded: 2020
- Constructors: Porsche
- Tyre suppliers: Yokohama
- Last Drivers' champion: (Canada) Jeff Kingsley/ (United States) Curt Swearingin
- Last Teams' champion: (United States) Kelly Moss / (United States) ACI Motorsports
- Official website: porschegt3cupusa.imsa.com

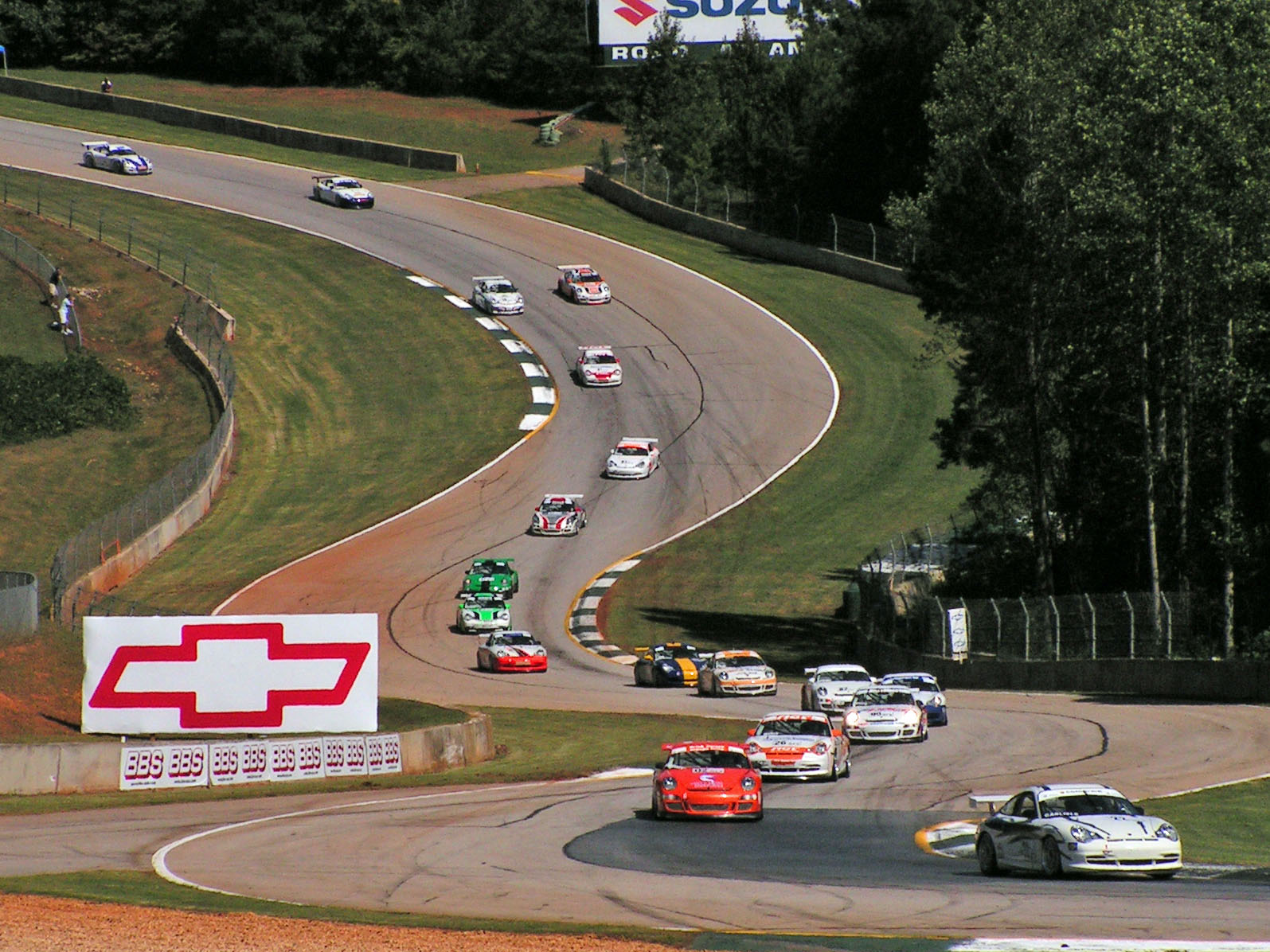
Start of the 2006 race at Road Atlanta

The Porsche GT3 Cup Challenge USA by Yokohama (also known as IMSA GT3 Cup Challenge) was a one-make racing series based in the United States using Porsche 911 GT3s.

The Porsche GT3 Cup Challenge USA by Yokohama entered its 16th & final season in 2020 and was the largest of Porsche's 20 single-make Cup Challenge series in the world. The series produced competition for semi-professional and aspiring professional drivers in the world's most produced race car, the Porsche 911 GT3 Cup.

Racing was divided into two classes – Platinum Cup, featuring the 2017-2019 Porsche 911 GT3 Cup car, which is based on the eighth generation of the street car (991.2), and Gold Cup, featuring the 2014–2016 Porsche 911 GT3 Cup car, which is based on the seventh generation of the street car (991.1). A Masters Championship also was conducted in Platinum class, this class consisted of drivers 45 years of age or older. Each class was awarded with its own podium at the end of every race and individual champion at the end of every season. Points were awarded by finish in class.

The series was sanctioned by the International Motor Sports Association, and was a support series to the WeatherTech SportsCar Championship. It has now been replaced by Porsche Carrera Cup North America starting in 2021.

== Circuits ==
- (Illinois) Autobahn Raceway (2009)
- (Maryland) Baltimore Street Circuit (2013)
- (Alabama) Barber Motorsports Park (2017–2019)
- (Ontario) Canadian Tire Motorsport Park (2006–2009, 2011–2015)
- (Quebec) Circuit Gilles Villeneuve (2008, 2011–2012, 2016, 2019)
- (Texas) Circuit of the Americas (2013–2017)
- (Indiana) Indianapolis Motor Speedway (2007)
- (California) Laguna Seca (2005–2016, 2019)
- (Connecticut) Lime Rock Park (2011, 2014, 2003–2015)
- Mid-Ohio Sports Car Course (2005–2008, 2010, 2018–2020)
- New Jersey Motorsports Park (2010)
- (Louisiana) NOLA Motorsports Park (2015)
- (Oregon) Portland International Raceway (2005)
- (Wisconsin) Road America (2005–2006, 2009–2020)
- (Georgia (U.S. state)) Road Atlanta (2005–2014, 2016–2020)
- (Florida) Sebring International Raceway (2006–2020)
- (California) Sonoma Raceway (2017–2018)
- (Florida) St. Petersburg Street Circuit (2020)
- Utah Motorsports Campus (2006–2012)
- Virginia International Raceway (2012, 2015–2020)
- (New York (state)) Watkins Glen International (2013–2019)

== Champions ==
Season	Champion	
2005	(United States) Jay Policastro	
2006	997 Class Champion	996 Class Champion
2006	(United States) Nathan Swartzbaugh	(United States) Dino Loles
2007	Champion	
2007	(United States) Bob Faieta	
2008	Platinum Class Champion	Gold Class Champion
2008	(United States) Bob Faieta	(United States) Tony Rivera
2009	Platinum Class Champion	Gold Class Champion
2009	(United States) Bob Faieta	(United States) Melanie Snow
2010	Platinum Class Champion	Gold Class Champion
2010	(United States) Ross Smith	(United States) Henrique Cisneros
2011	Platinum Class Champion	Gold Class Champion
2011	(United States) Henrique Cisneros	(United States) Madison Snow
2012	Platinum Class Champion	Gold Class Champion
2012	(United States) Sean Johnston	(Venezuela) Angel Benitez, Jr
2013	Platinum Class Champion	Gold Class Champion
2013	(United States) Madison Snow	(United States) Michael Levitas
2014	Platinum Class Champion	Gold Class Champion
2014	(United States) Colin Thompson	(Haiti) Patrick-Otto Madsen
2015	Platinum Class Champion	Gold Class Champion
2015	(United States) Elliott Skeer	(United States) Jeff Mosing
2016	Platinum Class Champion	Gold Class Champion
2016	(Canada) Jesse Lazare	(United States) Michael de Quesada
2017	Platinum Class Champion	Gold Class Champion
2017	(United States) Jake Eidson	(United States) Fred Kaimer
2018	Platinum Class Champion	Gold Class Champion
2018	(United States) Trenton Estep	(United States) Victor Gomez
2019	Platinum Class Champion	Gold Class Champion
2019	(Canada) Roman De Angelis	(Puerto Rico) Sebastian Carazo
2020	Platinum Class Champion	Gold Class Champion
2020	(Canada) Jeff Kingsley	(United States) Curt Swearingin
