= Gunnar Jeannette =

American racing driver (born 1982)

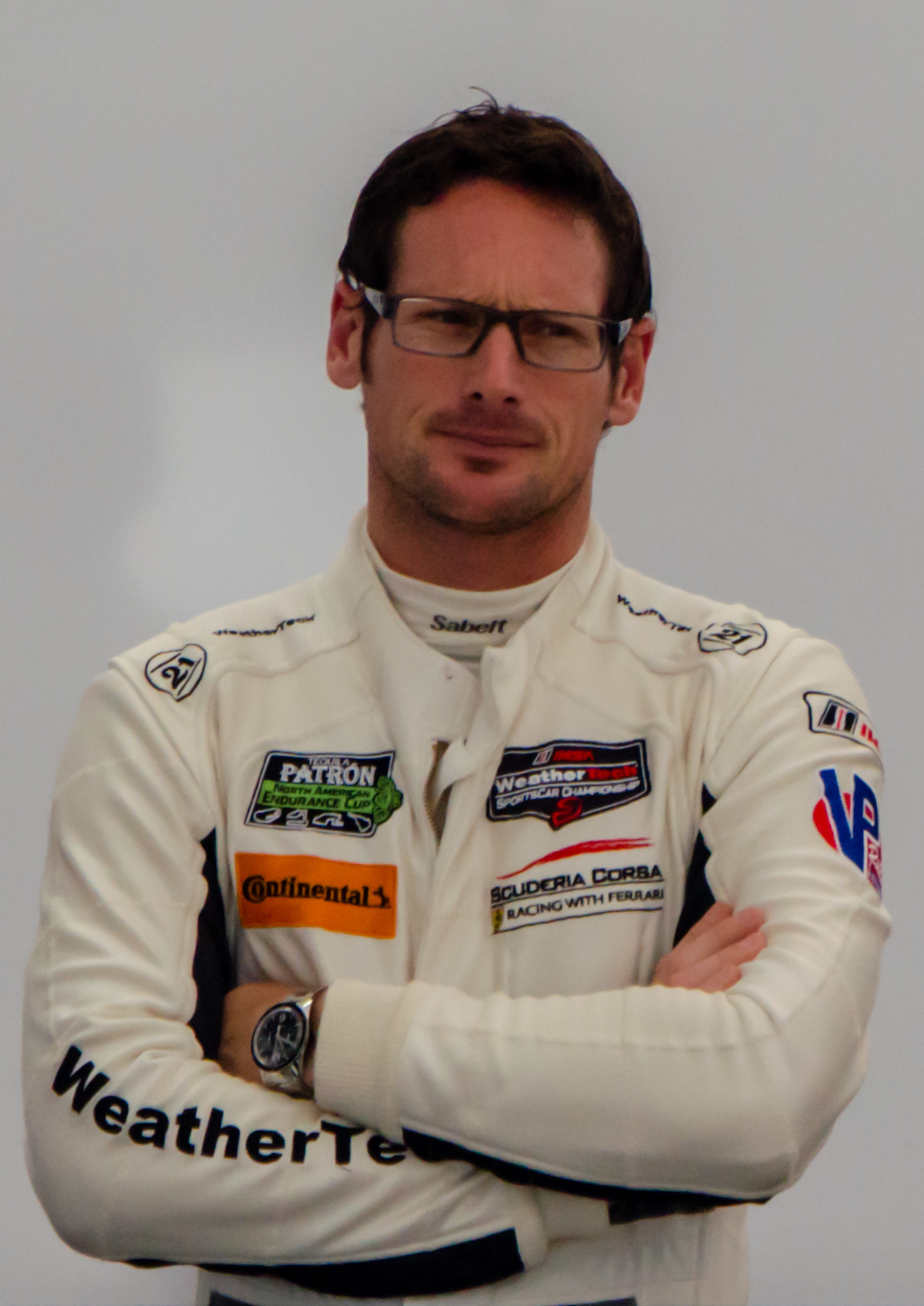
- Jeannette at the 2018 Petit Le Mans
- Nationality: American
- Born: May 5, 1982 (age 44) West Palm Beach, Florida, U.S.

IMSA WeatherTech Championship career
- Current team: WeatherTech Racing
- Categorisation: FIA Gold (until 2015, 2019–2021); FIA Silver (2016–2018, 2022–)

Previous series
- American Le Mans Series; Rolex Sports Car Series; World Endurance Championship; European LeMans Series

Championship titles
- 2011: ALMS – LMPC

Gunnar Patrick Jeannette (born May 5, 1982 in West Palm Beach, Florida) is an American racing driver who serves as the Team Principal for AO Racing. He won the 2011 American Le Mans Series season LMPC Drivers' Championship.

== Early racing career ==
Jeannette started racing, driving in Historic Sports Car racing at the age of 16. He made the jump to the professional ranks less than one year later.

== American Le Mans Series ==
Jeannette made his American Le Mans Series debut in 2000, scoring six top-ten finishes in seven starts in both the Prototype and GT classes. In 2002, he made his LMP900 class debut in a Panoz before moving to the factory supported JML Team Panoz squad in 2003, where he scored his best-ever overall finish of third (2nd in class) at Mosport.

For 2004, Jeannette moved back to GT2, piloting the Panoz Esperante GTLM for what turned out to be a three-year stint with two different teams. His best result was a fourth at Mosport and Petit Le Mans with co-driver Tommy Milner in 2006.

After making a handful of starts in 2008 for Corsa Motorsports, Jeannette returned to full-time ALMS competition in 2010 in the new LMPC class. Driving for his father's Green Earth Team Gunnar outfit, Jeannette became the first LMPC pole winner in series history. He went on to win four races with Elton Julian and finish second in the Drivers Championship that year.

Jeannette joined CORE autosport for 2011 and continued his streak of success in LMPC, taking two wins, three pole positions and three fastest race laps en route to the LMPC Drivers Championship. He shared the honor with season-long co-driver Ricardo Gonzalez and Genoa Racing's Eric Lux, who ended up on equal points to the CORE autosport duo.

== 24 Hours of Le Mans ==
At the age of 18, Jeannette became the youngest-ever driver to finish the 24 Hours of Le Mans, in his race debut in 2000. He's since competed an additional seven times, with a best finish of fifth overall in 2003.

== Grand-Am ==
Jeannette made his debut in the Grand-Am Rolex Sports Car Series GTU class at the 2000 Rolex 24 at Daytona. He won his first-ever Rolex Series race one year later in the GTS class and has since made sporadic starts in the series.

In 2005, Jeannette ran his first full season in the Continental Tire Sports Car Challenge, finishing sixth in GS Points Standings with two victories to his credit driving for Multimatic Motorsports. He returned to full-time competition in 2010 with co-driver Frankie Montecalvo, finishing tenth in the GS class championship.

For 2012, Jeannette rejoined Multimatic Motorsports for its new Street Tuner-class Ford Focus ST-R development program.

== FIA World Endurance Championship ==
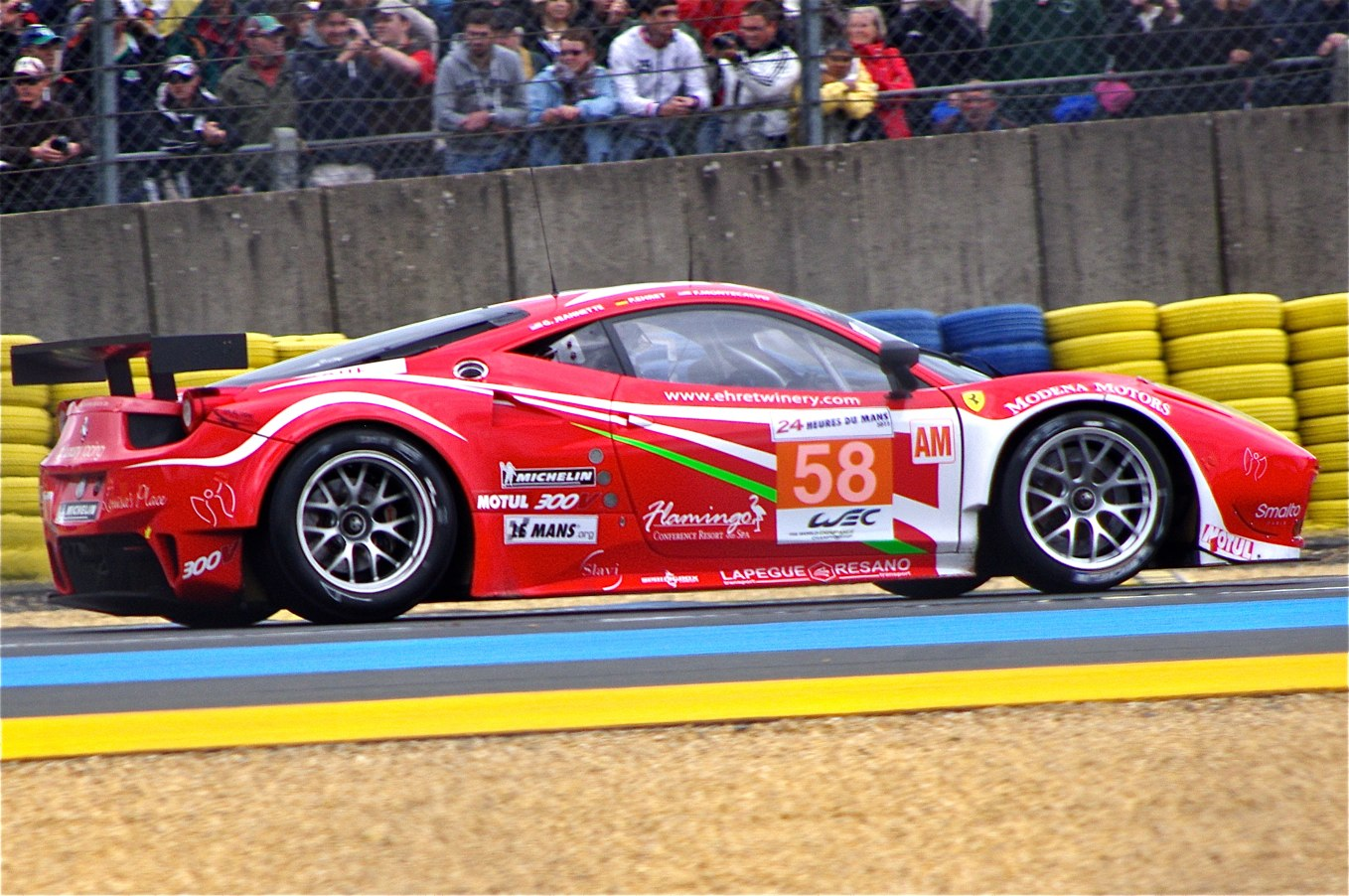
The No. 58 458 Italia GT2 that Jeannate drove during the 2012 24 Hours of Le Mans

Jeannette made his FIA World Endurance Championship debut in the 6 Hours of Spa-Francorchamps on May 5, 2012, co-driving the No. 58 Luxury Racing Ferrari F458 Italia with Frankie Montecalvo and Pierre Ehret to a fifth-place finish in the GTE-Am class. The trio did not finish the 2012 24 Hours of Le Mans after suffering an accident during the overnight hours.

== 24H Series ==
Jeannette made his 24H Series return, at the first round of 2021 in the Dubai 24 Hour at the Dubai Autodrome for Simpson Motorsport in an Audi RS3 LMS TCR. He had previously raced in 2013 in a Ferrari 458 Italia GT3 for Ram Racing.

== Personal life ==
Jeannette is an avid extreme sporting enthusiast. Since 2004, he has done over 1,500 skydives and 200 BASE jumps in various locations worldwide. Jeannette has also participated in world record skydives and has been featured on MTV, People Magazine, USA Today and several other local and national publications.

== Racing record ==
=== 24 Hours of Le Mans results ===
Year	Team	Co-Drivers	Car	Class	Laps	Pos.	Class Pos.
2000	(Germany) Manthey Racing (United States) Gunnar Racing	(United States) Michael Brockman (United States) Mike Lauer	Porsche 911 GT3-R	GT	261	27th	6th
2001	(Germany) Freisinger Motorsport	(France) Romain Dumas (France) Philippe Haezebrouck	Porsche 911 GT3-RS	GT	282	7th	**2nd**
2002	(United States) Panoz Motor Sports	(United States) Bill Auberlen (United States) David Donohue	Panoz LMP01 Evo-Élan	LMP900	230	DNF	DNF
2003	(United States) JML Team Panoz	(Monaco) Olivier Beretta (Italy) Max Papis	Panoz LMP01 Evo-Élan	LMP900	360	5th	**3rd**
2004	(France) Epsilon Sport	(France) Renaud Derlot (United Kingdom) Gavin Pickering	Courage C65-JPX	LMP2	124	DNF	DNF
2006	(Canada) Multimatic Motorsport Team Panoz	(Canada) Scott Maxwell (United States) Tommy Milner	Panoz Esperante GT-LM	GT2	34	DNF	DNF
2008	(United Kingdom) Team Bruichladdich Radical	(France) Marc Rostan (United Kingdom) Ben Devlin	Radical SR9-AER	LMP2	297	31st	6th
2012	(France) Luxury Racing	(Germany) Pierre Ehret (United States) Frankie Montecalvo	Ferrari 458 Italia GTC	GTE; Am	146	DNF	DNF
2023	(Germany) Project 1 – AO	(Italy) Matteo Cairoli (United States) P. J. Hyett	Porsche 911 RSR-19	GTE; Am	309	35th	7th

=== Complete European Le Mans Series results ===
(key) (Races in bold indicate pole position)

Year	Team	Class	Make	Engine	1	2	3	4	5	Rank	Points
2013	Ram Racing	LMGTE	Ferrari 458 Italia GT2	Ferrari F142 4.5L V8	SIL; 3	IMO; 3	RBR; 3	HUN; 6	LEC; 5	5th	63
2020	JMW Motorsport	LMGTE	Ferrari 488 GTE Evo	Ferrari F154CB 3.9 L Turbo V8	LEC	SPA; 9	LEC; 7	MNZ; 6	ALG; 7	11th	26

=== Complete IMSA SportsCar Championship results ===
(key) (Races in bold indicate pole position)

Year	Team	Class	Make	Engine	1	2	3	4	5	6	7	8	9	10	11	12	Rank	Points	Ref
2014	PR1/Mathiasen Motorsports	PC	Oreca FLM09	Chevrolet 6.2L LS3 V8	DAY; 4	SEB; 9	LGA; 4	KAN; 4	WGL; 3	IMS; 5	ELK; 7	VIR; 8	COT; 4	PET; 3			4th	255	
2016	Alex Job Racing	GTD	Porsche 911 GT3 R	Porsche 4.0L Flat-6	DAY; 13	SEB; 5	LGA	DET	WGL; 5†	MOS	LIM	ELK; 13	VIR	AUS	PET		23rd	66	
2017	Riley Motorsports - WeatherTech Racing	GTD	Mercedes-AMG GT3	Mercedes-AMG M159 6.2 V8	DAY; 21	SEB; 21	LBH; 1	COA; 6	DET; 12	WGL; 4	MOS; 11	LIM; 10					11th	254	
2017	Riley Motorsports - WeatherTech Racing	GTD	Porsche 911 GT3 R	Porsche 4.0L Flat-6									ELK; 9	VIR; 6	LGA; 6	PET; 17	11th	254	
2018	Scuderia Corsa	GTD	Ferrari 488 GT3	Ferrari F154CB 3.9 Turbo V8	DAY; 10	SEB; 2	MDO	DET	WGL; 7	MOS	LIM; 3	ELK	VIR; 4	LGA; 8	**PET**; 1		4th	295	
2023	AO Racing Team	GTD	Porsche 911 GT3 R (992)	Porsche 4.2 L Flat-6	DAY; 14	SEB; 16	LBH	MON; 11	WGL; 14	MOS	LIM	ELK	VIR	IMS	PET; 8		27th	995	

^{†} Jeannette did not complete sufficient laps in order to score full points.
