= P. J. Hyett =

American software developer and co-founder of GitHub (born 1983)

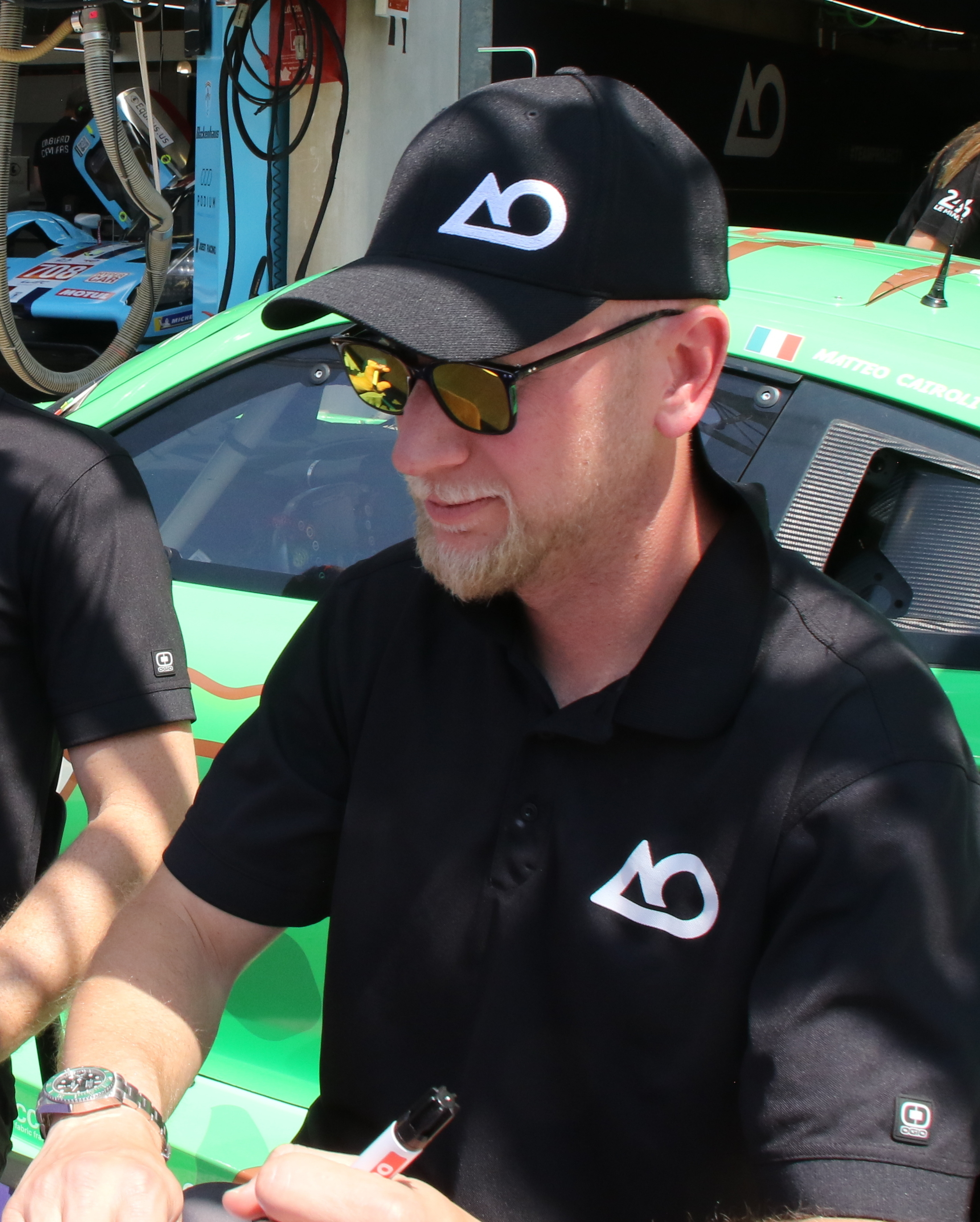
- Hyett in 2023
- Born: Phillip Jeffrey Hyett; August 10, 1983 (age 43); Naperville, Illinois, US
- Education: North Central College
- Occupations: Software developer Racing driver
- Categorisation: FIA Bronze
- Known for: Co-founder of GitHub
- Spouse: Kendra Hyett
- Children: 2
- Awards: 2025 Jim Trueman Award
- Website: https://hyett.com/

Phillip Jeffrey Hyett (born August 10, 1983) is an American software developer, technology entrepreneur, racing driver, and a co-founder of GitHub, an Internet hosting service for software development and version control using Git, which he created with Tom Preston-Werner and Chris Wanstrath in 2008.

In 2022, Hyett founded an auto racing team, AO Racing in the IMSA WeatherTech SportsCar Championship. He himself also competes in the IMSA LMP2 class and is a 24 Hours of Le Mans class winner.

== Early life ==
Hyett was born on August 10, 1983, and grew up in Naperville, Illinois. He earned a bachelor's degree in computer science from North Central College.

== Career ==
After graduation, Hyett moved to San Francisco. He was a senior software engineer at CNET Networks, and then a partner at Error Free, before co-founding GitHub in 2008.

Following the acquisition of GitHub by Microsoft in June 2018, Hyett's stake in the company had an estimated value of "close to $1 billion". In 2021, his net worth was estimated at $1.6 billion.

== Personal life ==
Hyett is married to Kendra, who works in the non-profit sector, and has a bachelor's degree in English from North Central College. They have two children and live in west Chicago.

== Racing career ==
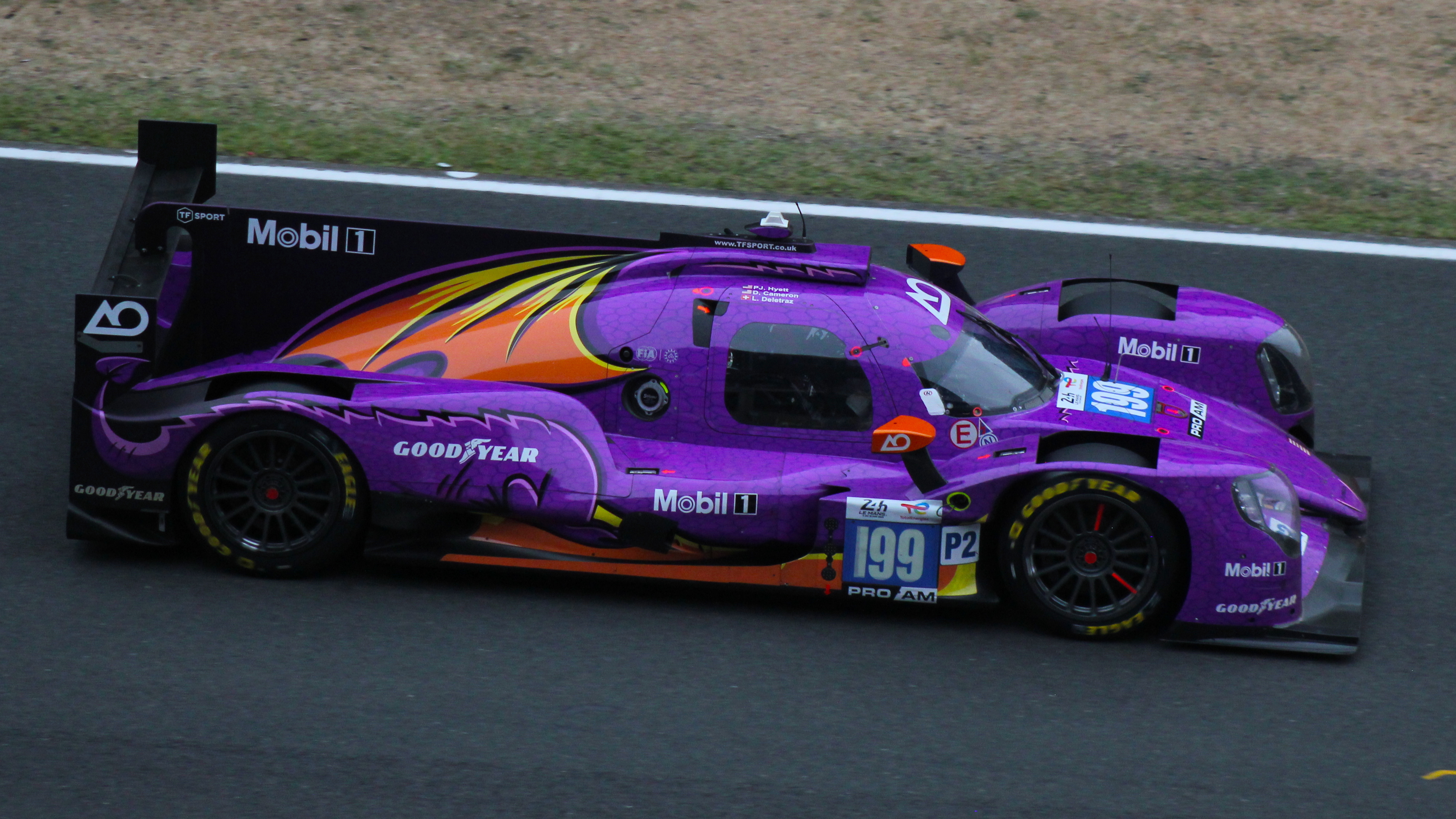
Hyett's class-winning No. 199 car at the 2025 24 Hours of Le Mans

In 2022, Hyett made his racing debut at the Watkins Glen circuit in the GT World Challenge America series, driving for Team Hardpoint alongside Gunnar Jeannette. The duo subsequently partook in the final round of the Le Mans Cup prior to moving into the LMGTE Am class of the FIA World Endurance Championship. Led by pro driver Ben Barnicoat, Hyett and Jeannette finished second on their first WEC outing at Bahrain.

Having formed AO Racing in the autumn of 2022, the Hyett and Jeannette duo partnered with WEC outfit Team Project 1 to contest the full season in 2023. As well as that, Hyett took part in the GTD class of the IMSA SportsCar Championship, driving together with Sebastian Priaulx. The campaign did not prove fruitful, as Hyett missed out on any podiums in addition to suffering a crash in qualifying which made him miss the 6 Hours of Spa-Francorchamps due to a back injury.

Hyett experienced a turnaround during the winter, where he partnered Paul-Loup Chatin and Harry Tincknell in the LMP2 class of the Asian Le Mans Series. After two top-five finishes at Sepang, Hyett scored the first pole position of his car at the Dubai Autodrome. Though he and his Proton Competition teammates finished a lowly eighth in the teams' standings, Hyett had demonstrated improved pace in the leadup to a full-time switch to the category, as he and Chatin paired up for AO Racing in the IMSA SportsCar Championship.

Hyett also took part in the 24 Hours of Le Mans in 2024, driving an AO Racing Oreca 07 run by TF Sport alongside Louis Delétraz and Alex Quinn. In 2025, he won the LMP2 Pro-Am class and finished on the overall LMP2 podium.

== Racing record ==
=== Racing career summary ===
Season	Series	Team	Races	Wins	Poles	F/Laps	Podiums	Points	Position
2022	FIA World Endurance Championship - LMGTE Am	Team Project 1	1	0	0	0	1	27	18th
2022	GT World Challenge America - Pro-Am	Team Hardpoint	1	0	0	0	0	4	17th
2022	GT America Series - SR03	Team Hardpoint	2	0	0	1	1	0	NC†
2022	Le Mans Cup - GT3	Schnitzelalm Racing	1	0	0	0	0	0	NC†
2023	FIA World Endurance Championship - LMGTE Am	Project 1 – AO	4	0	0	0	0	24	17th
2023	24 Hours of Le Mans - LMGTE Am	Project 1 – AO	1	0	0	0	0	N/A	7th
2023	IMSA SportsCar Championship - GTD	AO Racing Team	9	0	0	0	0	2015	16th
2023	Porsche Carrera Cup North America	Kelly-Moss Road and Race	6	0	0	0	0	0	38th
2023–24	Asian Le Mans Series - LMP2	Proton Competition	5	0	1	0	0	30	9th
2024	IMSA SportsCar Championship - LMP2	AO Racing	7	0	4	0	1	1942	6th
2024	24 Hours of Le Mans - LMP2	AO by TF	1	0	0	0	0	N/A	6th
2025	IMSA SportsCar Championship - LMP2	AO Racing	7	2	2	0	3	2254	**1st**
2025	European Le Mans Series - LMP2 Pro-Am	AO by TF	6	1	2	0	5	100	**1st**
2025	24 Hours of Le Mans - LMP2 Pro-Am	AO by TF	1	1	0	0	1	N/A	**1st**
2026	IMSA SportsCar Championship - LMP2	AO Racing	7	1	1	1	2	2087	4th
2026	European Le Mans Series - LMP2	AO by TF	6	0	1	0	2	45	8th
2026	24 Hours of Le Mans - LMP2 Pro-Am	AO by TF	1	0	0	0	1	N/A	**3rd**

† As Hyett was a guest driver, he was ineligible to score championship points.

=== Complete FIA World Endurance Championship results ===
(key) (Races in bold indicate pole position; races in italics indicate fastest lap)

Year	Entrant	Class	Chassis	Engine	1	2	3	4	5	6	7	Rank	Points
2022	Team Project 1	LMGTE Am	Porsche 911 RSR-19	Porsche 4.2 L Flat-6	SEB	SPA	LMS	MON	FUJ	BHR; 2		18th	27
2023	Project 1 – AO	LMGTE Am	Porsche 911 RSR-19	Porsche 4.2 L Flat-6	SEB; 12	PRT	SPA; WD	LMS; 7	MNZ	FUJ; 5	BHR; 10	17th	24

=== 24 Hours of Le Mans results ===
Year	Team	Co-Drivers	Car	Class	Laps	Pos.	Class Pos.
2023	(Germany) Project 1 - AO	(Italy) Matteo Cairoli (United States) Gunnar Jeannette	Porsche 911 RSR-19	GTE; Am	309	35th	7th
2024	(United States) AO by TF	(Switzerland) Louis Delétraz (United Kingdom) Alex Quinn	Oreca 07-Gibson	LMP2	295	20th	6th
2024	(United States) AO by TF	(Switzerland) Louis Delétraz (United Kingdom) Alex Quinn	Oreca 07-Gibson	LMP2 Pro-Am	295	20th	**2nd**
2025	(United States) AO by TF	(United States) Dane Cameron (Switzerland) Louis Delétraz	Oreca 07-Gibson	LMP2	366	20th	**3rd**
2025	(United States) AO by TF	(United States) Dane Cameron (Switzerland) Louis Delétraz	Oreca 07-Gibson	LMP2 Pro-Am	366	20th	**1st**
2026	(United States) AO by TF	(Australia) James Allen (United States) Dane Cameron	Oreca 07-Gibson	LMP2	356	24th	10th
2026	(United States) AO by TF	(Australia) James Allen (United States) Dane Cameron	Oreca 07-Gibson	LMP2 Pro-Am	356	24th	**3rd**

=== Complete IMSA SportsCar Championship results ===
(key) (Races in bold indicate pole position)

Year	Team	Class	Make	Engine	1	2	3	4	5	6	7	8	9	10	11	Rank	Points	Ref
2023	AO Racing Team	GTD	Porsche 911 GT3 R (992)	Porsche 4.2 L Flat-6	DAY; 14	SEB; 16	LBH; DNS	MON	WGL; 14	MOS; 8	LIM; 7	ELK; 11	VIR; 6	IMS; 10	PET; 8	16th	2015	
2024	AO Racing	LMP2	Oreca 07	Gibson GK428 4.2 L V8	DAY; 8	**SEB**; 11	**WGL**; 7	**MOS**; 8	**ELK**; 3	IMS; 4	ATL; 7					6th	1942	
2025	AO Racing	LMP2	Oreca 07	Gibson GK428 4.2 L V8	DAY; 5	SEB; 7	**WGL**; 2	**MOS**; 1	ELK; 1	IMS; 5	PET; 6					1st	2254	
2026	AO Racing	LMP2	Oreca 07	Gibson GK428 4.2 L V8	DAY; 5	SEB; 6	WGL; 1	MOS; 3	ELK; 4	IMS; 8	PET; 10					4th	2087	

=== Complete Asian Le Mans Series results ===
(key) (Races in bold indicate pole position) (Races in italics indicate fastest lap)

Year	Team	Class	Car	Engine	1	2	3	4	5	Pos.	Points
2023–24	Proton Competition	LMP2	Oreca 07	Gibson GK428 4.2 L V8	SEP; 1; 4	SEP; 2; 5	**DUB**; 7	ABU; 1; 10	ABU; 2 Ret	9th	30

=== Complete European Le Mans Series results ===
(key) (Races in bold indicate pole position; results in italics indicate fastest lap)

Year	Entrant	Class	Chassis	Engine	1	2	3	4	5	6	Rank	Points
2025	AO by TF	LMP2 Pro-Am	Oreca 07	Gibson GK428 4.2 L V8	CAT; 8	**LEC**; 2	IMO; 1	SPA; 3	**SIL**; 2	ALG; 2	1st	100
2026	AO by TF	LMP2 Pro-Am	Oreca 07	Gibson GK428 4.2 L V8	CAT; 10	**LEC**; 2	IMO; 9	SPA; 3	SIL; 6	ALG; Ret	8th	45

^{*} Season still in progress.
