= 2024 Chevrolet Grand Prix =

Seventh round of the 2024 IMSA SportsCar Championship season

The layout of Canadian Tire Motorsports Park, where the race was held.

The 2024 Chevrolet Grand Prix was a sports car race held at Canadian Tire Motorsports Park in Bowmanville, Ontario, Canada, on July 14, 2024. It was the seventh round of the 2024 IMSA SportsCar Championship.

== Background ==
=== Preview ===
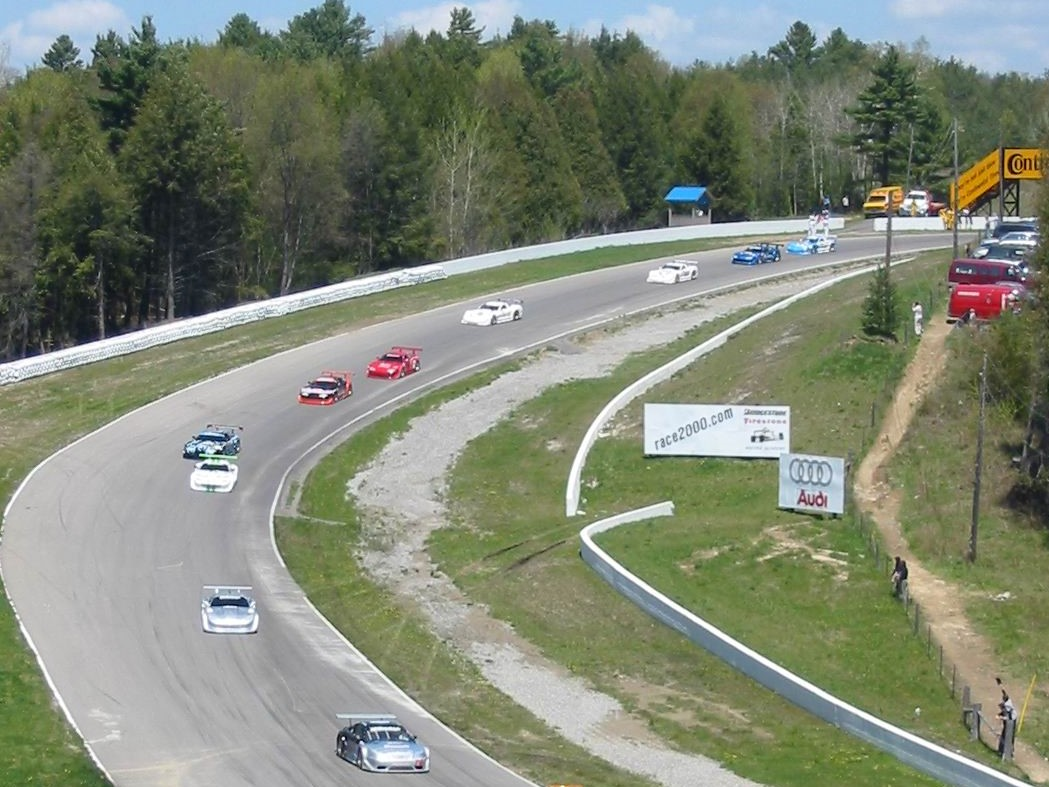
Canadian Tire Motorsports Park, where the race was held.

International Motor Sports Association (IMSA) president John Doonan confirmed the race was part of the 2024 IMSA SportsCar Championship (IMSA SCC) in August 2023. It was the ninth time the IMSA SCC hosted a race at Mosport. The 2024 Chevrolet Grand Prix was the seventh of eleven scheduled sports car races of 2024 by IMSA. The race was held at the ten-turn 2.459 mi (3.957 km) Canadian Tire Motorsports Park on July 14, 2024.

=== Standings before the race ===
The LMP2 Drivers' Championship was led by Josh Burdon, Felipe Fraga, and Gar Robinson after their second-place finish in Watkins Glen. They held a six-point lead over second-placed Ryan Dalziel, Dwight Merriman, Connor Zilisch, with Nick Boulle, Tom Dillmann, and Jakub Śmiechowski in third, 40 points behind Burdon, Fraga, and Robinson. The GTD Pro Drivers' Championship was topped by Laurin Heinrich and Sebastian Priaulx with 1632 points, 49 ahead of Ben Barnicoat and Jack Hawksworth in second. Ross Gunn sat in third, 60 points behind Heinrich and Priaulx. The GTD Drivers' Championship was led by Philip Ellis and Russell Ward with 1745 points after their fourth win of the season in Watkins Glen, 305 points ahead of Robby Foley and Patrick Gallagher in second. The Manufacturers' Championships were led by Porsche and Mercedes-AMG, respectively, and the Teams Championships' were led by Riley, AO Racing, and Winward Racing, respectively.

== Entry list ==
The entry list was revealed on July 3, 2024, and featured 35 entries: 12 entries in LMP2, 9 entries in GTD Pro, and 14 entries in GTD. The LMP2 class saw some changes: Filipe Albuquerque, Renger van der Zande, Scott Huffaker, Stuart Wilshire, Pipo Derani, and Louis Delétraz all participated in the headline LMP2 class during the event. In GTD Pro, Ross Gunn was once again partnered by Mario Farnbacher in the No. 23 Heart of Racing Team Aston Martin. In GTD, Spencer Pumpelly re-joined the No. 27 Heart of Racing Aston Martin. Furthermore, the No. 43 Andretti Motorsports Porsche and No. 120 Wright Motorsports Porsche were absent during the event.

No.	Entrant	Car	Driver 1	Driver 2
LMP2 (Le Mans Prototype 2) (12 entries)
04	(United States) CrowdStrike Racing by APR	Oreca 07-Gibson	(United States) Colin Braun	(United States) George Kurtz
2	(United States) United Autosports USA	Oreca 07-Gibson	(United Kingdom) Ben Hanley	(United States) Ben Keating
8	(United States) Tower Motorsports	Oreca 07-Gibson	(Canada) John Farano	(Netherlands) Renger van der Zande
11	(France) TDS Racing	Oreca 07-Gibson	(United States) Scott Huffaker	(United States) Steven Thomas
18	(United States) Era Motorsport	Oreca 07-Gibson	(United Kingdom) Ryan Dalziel	(United Kingdom) Stuart Wiltshire
20	(Denmark) MDK by High Class Racing	Oreca 07-Gibson	(Denmark) Dennis Andersen	(United States) Seth Lucas
22	(United States) United Autosports USA	Oreca 07-Gibson	(Portugal) Filipe Albuquerque	(United States) Dan Goldburg
33	(United States) Sean Creech Motorsport	Ligier JS P217-Gibson	(Portugal) João Barbosa	(United States) Lance Willsey
52	(Poland) Inter Europol by PR1/Mathiasen Motorsports	Oreca 07-Gibson	(United States) Nick Boulle	(France) Tom Dillmann
74	(United States) Riley	Oreca 07-Gibson	(Brazil) Felipe Fraga	(United States) Gar Robinson
88	(Italy) Richard Mille AF Corse	Oreca 07-Gibson	(Argentina) Luis Pérez Companc	(Brazil) Pipo Derani
99	(United States) AO Racing	Oreca 07-Gibson	(Switzerland) Louis Delétraz	(United States) P. J. Hyett
GTD Pro (GT Daytona Pro) (9 entries)
1	(United States) Paul Miller Racing	BMW M4 GT3	(United States) Bryan Sellers	(United States) Madison Snow
3	(United States) Corvette Racing by Pratt Miller Motorsports	Chevrolet Corvette Z06 GT3.R	(Spain) Antonio García	(United Kingdom) Alexander Sims
4	(United States) Corvette Racing by Pratt Miller Motorsports	Chevrolet Corvette Z06 GT3.R	(Netherlands) Nicky Catsburg	(United States) Tommy Milner
9	(Canada) Pfaff Motorsports	McLaren 720S GT3 Evo	(United Kingdom) Oliver Jarvis	(Germany) Marvin Kirchhöfer
14	(United States) Vasser Sullivan	Lexus RC F GT3	(United Kingdom) Ben Barnicoat	(United Kingdom) Jack Hawksworth
23	(United States) Heart of Racing Team	Aston Martin Vantage AMR GT3 Evo	(Germany) Mario Farnbacher	(United Kingdom) Ross Gunn
64	(Canada) Ford Multimatic Motorsports	Ford Mustang GT3	(Germany) Mike Rockenfeller	(United Kingdom) Harry Tincknell
65	(Canada) Ford Multimatic Motorsports	Ford Mustang GT3	(United States) Joey Hand	(Germany) Dirk Müller
77	(United States) AO Racing	Porsche 911 GT3 R (992)	(Germany) Laurin Heinrich	(United Kingdom) Sebastian Priaulx
GTD (GT Daytona) (13 entries)
12	(United States) Vasser Sullivan	Lexus RC F GT3	(United States) Frankie Montecalvo	(Canada) Parker Thompson
13	(Canada) AWA	Chevrolet Corvette Z06 GT3.R	(United Kingdom) Matt Bell	(Canada) Orey Fidani
27	(United States) Heart of Racing Team	Aston Martin Vantage AMR GT3 Evo	(Canada) Roman De Angelis	(United States) Spencer Pumpelly
32	(United States) Korthoff/Preston Motorsports	Mercedes-AMG GT3 Evo	(Canada) Mikaël Grenier	(United States) Mike Skeen
34	(United States) Conquest Racing	Ferrari 296 GT3	(Spain) Albert Costa	(United States) Manny Franco
45	(United States) Wayne Taylor Racing with Andretti	Lamborghini Huracán GT3 Evo 2	(Costa Rica) Danny Formal	(Canada) Kyle Marcelli
55	(Germany) Proton Competition	Ford Mustang GT3	(Italy) Giammarco Levorato	(United States) Corey Lewis
57	(United States) Winward Racing	Mercedes-AMG GT3 Evo	(Switzerland) Philip Ellis	(United States) Russell Ward
66	(United States) Gradient Racing	Acura NSX GT3 Evo22	(United Kingdom) Stevan McAleer	(United States) Sheena Monk
70	(United Kingdom) Inception Racing	McLaren 720S GT3 Evo	(United States) Brendan Iribe	(Denmark) Frederik Schandorff
78	(United States) Forte Racing	Lamborghini Huracán GT3 Evo 2	(Canada) Misha Goikhberg	(Italy) Loris Spinelli
86	(United States) MDK Motorsports	Porsche 911 GT3 R (992)	(Denmark) Anders Fjordbach	(China) Kerong Li
96	(United States) Turner Motorsport	BMW M4 GT3	(United States) Robby Foley	(United States) Patrick Gallagher

== Qualifying ==
Saturday's afternoon qualifying session was broken into two sessions, with one session for the LMP2, GTD Pro and GTD classes, which lasted 15 minutes each. The rules dictated that all teams nominated a driver to qualify their cars, with the Pro-Am LMP2 class requiring a Bronze rated driver to qualify the car. The competitors' fastest lap times determined the starting order. IMSA then arranged the grid to put LMP2s ahead of the GTD Pro, and GTD cars.

=== Qualifying results ===
Pole positions in each class are indicated in bold and with ‡.

Pos.	Class	No.	Entry	Driver	Time	Gap	Grid
1	**LMP2**	**99**	**(United States) AO Racing**	**(United States) P. J. Hyett**	**1:09.582**	—	1‡
2	LMP2	22	(United States) United Autosports USA	(United States) Dan Goldburg	1:09.672	+0.090	2
3	LMP2	74	(United States) Riley	(United States) Gar Robinson	1:09.690	+0.108	3
4	LMP2	52	(Poland) Inter Europol by PR1/Mathiasen Motorsports	(United States) Nick Boulle	1:09.756	+0.174	4
5	LMP2	11	(France) TDS Racing	(United States) Steven Thomas	1:09.824	+0.242	5
6	LMP2	04	(United States) CrowdStrike Racing by APR	(United States) George Kurtz	1:10.017	+0.435	6
7	LMP2	2	(United States) United Autosports USA	(United States) Ben Keating	1:11.392	+1.810	7
8	LMP2	8	(United States) Tower Motorsports	(Canada) John Farano	1:12.020	+2.438	8
9	LMP2	33	(United States) Sean Creech Motorsport	(United States) Lance Willsey	1:13.891	+4.309	9
10	LMP2	18	(United States) Era Motorsport	(United Kingdom) Stuart Wiltshire	1:13.919	+4.337	10
11	LMP2	88	(Italy) Richard Mille AF Corse	(Argentina) Luis Pérez Companc	1:14.195^{1}	+4.613	11
12	**GTD Pro**	**3**	**(United States) Corvette Racing by Pratt Miller Motorsports**	**(United Kingdom) Alexander Sims**	**1:14.373**	**+4.791**	13‡
13	GTD Pro	14	(United States) Vasser Sullivan	(United Kingdom) Jack Hawksworth	1:14.640	+4.791	14
14	**GTD**	**12**	**(United States) Vasser Sullivan**	**(United States) Frankie Montecalvo**	**1:15.060**	**+5.478**	15‡
15	GTD Pro	4	(United States) Corvette Racing by Pratt Miller Motorsports	(United States) Tommy Milner	1:15.105	+5.523	16
16	GTD Pro	64	(Canada) Ford Multimatic Motorsports	(United Kingdom) Harry Tincknell	1:15.177	+5.595	17
17	GTD Pro	1	(United States) Paul Miller Racing	(United States) Madison Snow	1:15.193	+5.611	18
18	GTD Pro	23	(United States) Heart of Racing Team	(Germany) Mario Farnbacher	1:13.318	+5.736	19
19	GTD Pro	9	(Canada) Pfaff Motorsports	(Germany) Marvin Kirchhöfer	1:15.390	+5.808	20
20	GTD	27	(United States) Heart of Racing Team	(United States) Spencer Pumpelly	1:15.392	+5.810	21
21	GTD Pro	77	(United States) AO Racing	(United Kingdom) Sebastian Priaulx	1:15.519	+5.937	22
22	GTD	96	(United States) Turner Motorsport	(United States) Patrick Gallagher	1:15.560	+5.978	23
23	GTD	32	(United States) Korthoff/Preston Motorsports	(Canada) Mikaël Grenier	1:15.605	+6.023	24
24	GTD	70	(United Kingdom) Inception Racing	(United States) Brendan Iribe	1:15.693	+6.111	25
25	GTD	57	(United States) Winward Racing	(United States) Russell Ward	1:15.742	+6.160	26
26	GTD	45	(United States) Wayne Taylor Racing with Andretti	(Canada) Kyle Marcelli	1:15.807	+6.225	27
27	GTD Pro	65	(Canada) Ford Multimatic Motorsports	(United States) Joey Hand	1:16.000	+6.418	28
28	GTD	78	(United States) Forte Racing	(Canada) Misha Goikhberg	1:16.314	+6.732	29
29	GTD	66	(United States) Gradient Racing	(United States) Sheena Monk	1:16.372	+6.790	30
30	GTD	55	(Germany) Proton Competition	(Italy) Giammarco Levorato	1:16.614	+7.032	31
31	GTD	13	(Canada) AWA	(Canada) Orey Fidani	1:16.821	+7.239	32
32	GTD	86	(United States) MDK Motorsports	(China) Kerong Li	1:18.122	+8.540	33
33	LMP2	20	(Denmark) MDK by High Class Racing	(Denmark) Dennis Andersen	No Time Established^{2}		12
34	GTD	34	(United States) Conquest Racing	No Time Established^{3}			34
Sources:

- ^{1} The No. 88 Richard Mille AF Corse entry had its two fastest laps deleted as penalty for causing a red flag during its qualifying session.
- ^{2} The No. 20 MDK by High Class Racing entry had its two fastest laps deleted as penalty for causing a red flag during its qualifying session.
- ^{3} The No. 34 Conquest Racing entry had its two fastest laps deleted as penalty for causing a red flag during its qualifying session.

== Post-race ==
The final results kept Fraga and Robinson atop the LMP2 Drivers' Championship with 1308 points, 12 ahead of race winners Boulle and Dillmann. The final results of GTD Pro meant Heinrich and Priaulx extended their advantage to 98 points as Gunn advanced to second. Sims and García jumped from sixth to fourth while Sellers and Snow dropped to fifth. Ellis and Ward's second-place finish allowed them to extend their advantage to 340 points over fourth-place finishers Foley and Gallagher in the GTD Drivers' Championship. Porsche and Mercedes-AMG continued to top their respective Manufactures' Championships while Riley, AO Racing, and Winward Racing kept their respective advantages in their of Teams' Championships with four rounds remaining.

Class winners are in bold and ‡.

Pos	Class	No	Team	Drivers	Chassis	Laps	Time/Retired
Pos	Class	No	Team	Drivers	Engine	Laps	Time/Retired
1	**LMP2**	**52**	**(Poland) Inter Europol by PR1/Mathiasen Motorsports**	**(United States) Nick Boulle (France) Tom Dillmann**	**Oreca 07**	**117**	**2:40:34.358‡**
1	**LMP2**	**52**	**(Poland) Inter Europol by PR1/Mathiasen Motorsports**	**(United States) Nick Boulle (France) Tom Dillmann**	**Gibson GK428 4.2 L V8**	**117**	**2:40:34.358‡**
2	LMP2	74	(United States) Riley	(Brazil) Felipe Fraga (United States) Gar Robinson	Oreca 07	117	+0.658
2	LMP2	74	(United States) Riley	(Brazil) Felipe Fraga (United States) Gar Robinson	Gibson GK428 4.2 L V8	117	+0.658
3	LMP2	11	(France) TDS Racing	(United States) Scott Huffaker (United States) Steven Thomas	Oreca 07	117	+4.776
3	LMP2	11	(France) TDS Racing	(United States) Scott Huffaker (United States) Steven Thomas	Gibson GK428 4.2 L V8	117	+4.776
4	LMP2	2	(United States) United Autosports USA	(United Kingdom) Ben Hanley (United States) Ben Keating	Oreca 07	117	+5.079
4	LMP2	2	(United States) United Autosports USA	(United Kingdom) Ben Hanley (United States) Ben Keating	Gibson GK428 4.2 L V8	117	+5.079
5	LMP2	22	(United States) United Autosports USA	(Portugal) Filipe Albuquerque (United States) Dan Goldburg	Oreca 07	117	+11.740
5	LMP2	22	(United States) United Autosports USA	(Portugal) Filipe Albuquerque (United States) Dan Goldburg	Gibson GK428 4.2 L V8	117	+11.740
6	LMP2	8	(United States) Tower Motorsports	(Canada) John Farano (Netherlands) Renger van der Zande	Oreca 07	117	+13.540
6	LMP2	8	(United States) Tower Motorsports	(Canada) John Farano (Netherlands) Renger van der Zande	Gibson GK428 4.2 L V8	117	+13.540
7	LMP2	04	(United States) CrowdStrike Racing by APR	(United States) Colin Braun (United States) George Kurtz	Oreca 07	117	+13.641
7	LMP2	04	(United States) CrowdStrike Racing by APR	(United States) Colin Braun (United States) George Kurtz	Gibson GK428 4.2 L V8	117	+13.641
8	LMP2	99	(United States) AO Racing	(Switzerland) Louis Delétraz (United States) P. J. Hyett	Oreca 07	117	+13.773
8	LMP2	99	(United States) AO Racing	(Switzerland) Louis Delétraz (United States) P. J. Hyett	Gibson GK428 4.2 L V8	117	+13.773
9	LMP2	88	(Italy) Richard Mille AF Corse	(Argentina) Luis Pérez Companc (Brazil) Pipo Derani	Oreca 07	116	+1 Lap
9	LMP2	88	(Italy) Richard Mille AF Corse	(Argentina) Luis Pérez Companc (Brazil) Pipo Derani	Gibson GK428 4.2 L V8	116	+1 Lap
10	LMP2	33	(United States) Sean Creech Motorsport	(Portugal) João Barbosa (United States) Lance Willsey	Ligier JS P217	115	+2 Laps
10	LMP2	33	(United States) Sean Creech Motorsport	(Portugal) João Barbosa (United States) Lance Willsey	Gibson GK428 4.2 L V8	115	+2 Laps
11	LMP2	18	(United States) Era Motorsport	(United Kingdom) Ryan Dalziel (United Kingdom) Stuart Wiltshire	Oreca 07	113	+4 Laps
11	LMP2	18	(United States) Era Motorsport	(United Kingdom) Ryan Dalziel (United Kingdom) Stuart Wiltshire	Gibson GK428 4.2 L V8	113	+4 Laps
12	**GTD Pro**	**3**	**(United States) Corvette Racing by Pratt Miller Motorsports**	**(Spain) Antonio García (United Kingdom) Alexander Sims**	**Chevrolet Corvette Z06 GT3.R**	**113**	**+4 Laps‡**
12	**GTD Pro**	**3**	**(United States) Corvette Racing by Pratt Miller Motorsports**	**(Spain) Antonio García (United Kingdom) Alexander Sims**	**Chevrolet LT6 5.5 L V8**	**113**	**+4 Laps‡**
13	GTD Pro	4	(United States) Corvette Racing by Pratt Miller Motorsports	(Netherlands) Nicky Catsburg (United States) Tommy Milner	Chevrolet Corvette Z06 GT3.R	113	+4 Laps
13	GTD Pro	4	(United States) Corvette Racing by Pratt Miller Motorsports	(Netherlands) Nicky Catsburg (United States) Tommy Milner	Chevrolet LT6 5.5 L V8	113	+4 Laps
14	GTD Pro	77	(United States) AO Racing	(Germany) Laurin Heinrich (United Kingdom) Sebastian Priaulx	Porsche 911 GT3 R (992)	113	+4 Laps
14	GTD Pro	77	(United States) AO Racing	(Germany) Laurin Heinrich (United Kingdom) Sebastian Priaulx	Porsche M97/80 4.2 L Flat-6	113	+4 Laps
15	GTD Pro	64	(Canada) Ford Multimatic Motorsports	(Germany) Mike Rockenfeller (United Kingdom) Harry Tincknell	Ford Mustang GT3	113	+4 Laps
15	GTD Pro	64	(Canada) Ford Multimatic Motorsports	(Germany) Mike Rockenfeller (United Kingdom) Harry Tincknell	Ford Coyote 5.4 L V8	113	+4 Laps
16	GTD Pro	23	(United States) Heart of Racing Team	(Germany) Mario Farnbacher (United Kingdom) Ross Gunn	Aston Martin Vantage AMR GT3 Evo	112	+5 Laps
16	GTD Pro	23	(United States) Heart of Racing Team	(Germany) Mario Farnbacher (United Kingdom) Ross Gunn	Aston Martin M177 4.0 L Turbo V8	112	+5 Laps
17	GTD Pro	9	(Canada) Pfaff Motorsports	(United Kingdom) Oliver Jarvis (Germany) Marvin Kirchhöfer	McLaren 720S GT3 Evo	112	+5 Laps
17	GTD Pro	9	(Canada) Pfaff Motorsports	(United Kingdom) Oliver Jarvis (Germany) Marvin Kirchhöfer	McLaren M840T 4.0 L Turbo V8	112	+5 Laps
18	GTD Pro	65	(Canada) Ford Multimatic Motorsports	(United States) Joey Hand (Germany) Dirk Müller	Ford Mustang GT3	112	+5 Laps
18	GTD Pro	65	(Canada) Ford Multimatic Motorsports	(United States) Joey Hand (Germany) Dirk Müller	Ford Coyote 5.4 L V8	112	+5 Laps
19	**GTD**	**27**	**(United States) Heart of Racing Team**	**(Canada) Roman De Angelis (United States) Spencer Pumpelly**	**Aston Martin Vantage AMR GT3 Evo**	**112**	**+5 Laps‡**
19	**GTD**	**27**	**(United States) Heart of Racing Team**	**(Canada) Roman De Angelis (United States) Spencer Pumpelly**	**Aston Martin M177 4.0 L Turbo V8**	**112**	**+5 Laps‡**
20	GTD	57	(United States) Winward Racing	(Switzerland) Philip Ellis (United States) Russell Ward	Mercedes-AMG GT3 Evo	112	+5 Laps
20	GTD	57	(United States) Winward Racing	(Switzerland) Philip Ellis (United States) Russell Ward	Mercedes-AMG M159 6.2 L V8	112	+5 Laps
21	GTD	70	(United Kingdom) Inception Racing	(United States) Brendan Iribe (Denmark) Frederik Schandorff	McLaren 720S GT3 Evo	112	+5 Laps
21	GTD	70	(United Kingdom) Inception Racing	(United States) Brendan Iribe (Denmark) Frederik Schandorff	McLaren M840T 4.0 L Turbo V8	112	+5 Laps
22	GTD	96	(United States) Turner Motorsport	(United States) Robby Foley (United States) Patrick Gallagher	BMW M4 GT3	112	+5 Laps
22	GTD	96	(United States) Turner Motorsport	(United States) Robby Foley (United States) Patrick Gallagher	BMW P58 3.0 L Turbo I6	112	+5 Laps
23	GTD	12	(United States) Vasser Sullivan	(United States) Frankie Montecalvo (Canada) Parker Thompson	Lexus RC F GT3	111	+6 Laps
23	GTD	12	(United States) Vasser Sullivan	(United States) Frankie Montecalvo (Canada) Parker Thompson	Toyota 2UR-GSE 5.0 L V8	111	+6 Laps
24	GTD	45	(United States) Wayne Taylor Racing with Andretti	(Costa Rica) Danny Formal (Canada) Kyle Marcelli	Lamborghini Huracán GT3 Evo 2	111	+6 Laps
24	GTD	45	(United States) Wayne Taylor Racing with Andretti	(Costa Rica) Danny Formal (Canada) Kyle Marcelli	Lamborghini DGF 5.2 L V10	111	+6 Laps
25	GTD	66	(United States) Gradient Racing	(United Kingdom) Stevan McAleer (United States) Sheena Monk	Acura NSX GT3 Evo22	111	+6 Laps
25	GTD	66	(United States) Gradient Racing	(United Kingdom) Stevan McAleer (United States) Sheena Monk	Acura JNC1 3.5 L Turbo V6	111	+6 Laps
26	GTD	32	(United States) Korthoff/Preston Motorsports	(Canada) Mikaël Grenier (United States) Mike Skeen	Mercedes-AMG GT3 Evo	111	+6 Laps
26	GTD	32	(United States) Korthoff/Preston Motorsports	(Canada) Mikaël Grenier (United States) Mike Skeen	Mercedes-AMG M159 6.2 L V8	111	+6 Laps
27	GTD Pro	1	(United States) Paul Miller Racing	(United States) Bryan Sellers (United States) Madison Snow	BMW M4 GT3	111	+6 Laps
27	GTD Pro	1	(United States) Paul Miller Racing	(United States) Bryan Sellers (United States) Madison Snow	BMW P58 3.0 L Turbo I6	111	+6 Laps
28	GTD	78	(United States) Forte Racing	(Canada) Misha Goikhberg (Italy) Loris Spinelli	Lamborghini Huracán GT3 Evo 2	111	+6 Laps
28	GTD	78	(United States) Forte Racing	(Canada) Misha Goikhberg (Italy) Loris Spinelli	Lamborghini DGF 5.2 L V10	111	+6 Laps
29	GTD	86	(United States) MDK Motorsports	(Denmark) Anders Fjordbach (China) Kerong Li	Porsche 911 GT3 R (992)	111	+6 Laps
29	GTD	86	(United States) MDK Motorsports	(Denmark) Anders Fjordbach (China) Kerong Li	Porsche M97/80 4.2 L Flat-6	111	+6 Laps
30	GTD	34	(United States) Conquest Racing	(Spain) Albert Costa (United States) Manny Franco	Ferrari 296 GT3	111	+6 Laps
30	GTD	34	(United States) Conquest Racing	(Spain) Albert Costa (United States) Manny Franco	Ferrari F163 3.0 L Turbo V6	111	+6 Laps
31	GTD	55	(Germany) Proton Competition	(Italy) Giammarco Levorato (United States) Corey Lewis	Ford Mustang GT3	110	+7 Laps
31	GTD	55	(Germany) Proton Competition	(Italy) Giammarco Levorato (United States) Corey Lewis	Ford Coyote 5.4 L V8	110	+7 Laps
32 DNF	GTD Pro	14	(United States) Vasser Sullivan	(United Kingdom) Ben Barnicoat (United Kingdom) Jack Hawksworth	Lexus RC F GT3	88	Retired
32 DNF	GTD Pro	14	(United States) Vasser Sullivan	(United Kingdom) Ben Barnicoat (United Kingdom) Jack Hawksworth	Toyota 2UR-GSE 5.0 L V8	88	Retired
33 DNF	GTD	13	(Canada) AWA	(United Kingdom) Matt Bell (Canada) Orey Fidani	Chevrolet Corvette Z06 GT3.R	27	Retired
33 DNF	GTD	13	(Canada) AWA	(United Kingdom) Matt Bell (Canada) Orey Fidani	Chevrolet LT6 5.5 L V8	27	Retired
34 DNF	LMP2	20	(Denmark) MDK by High Class Racing	(Denmark) Dennis Andersen (United States) Seth Lucas	Oreca 07	15	Retired
34 DNF	LMP2	20	(Denmark) MDK by High Class Racing	(Denmark) Dennis Andersen (United States) Seth Lucas	Gibson GK428 4.2 L V8	15	Retired

== Standings after the race ==
GTP Drivers' Championship standings
Pos.	+/–	Driver	Points
1		(United States) Dane Cameron (Brazil) Felipe Nasr	2044
2		(France) Sébastien Bourdais (Netherlands) Renger van der Zande	1951
3		(France) Mathieu Jaminet (United Kingdom) Nick Tandy	1912
4		(Switzerland) Louis Delétraz (United States) Jordan Taylor	1845
5		(United Kingdom) Jack Aitken (Brazil) Pipo Derani	1838

LMP2 Drivers' Championship standings
Pos.	+/–	Driver	Points
1		(Brazil) Felipe Fraga (United States) Gar Robinson	1308
2	1	(United States) Nick Boulle (France) Tom Dillmann	1296
3	1	(United Kingdom) Ryan Dalziel	1173
4		(United States) Dan Goldburg	1142
5	1	(United States) Steven Thomas	1125

GTD Pro Drivers' Championship standings
Pos.	+/–	Driver	Points
1		(Germany) Laurin Heinrich (United Kingdom) Sebastian Priaulx	1955
2	1	(United Kingdom) Ross Gunn	1857
3	1	(United Kingdom) Ben Barnicoat (United Kingdom) Jack Hawksworth	1835
4	2	(Spain) Antonio García (United Kingdom) Alexander Sims	1774
5	1	(United States) Bryan Sellers (United States) Madison Snow	1679

GTD Drivers' Championship standings
Pos.	+/–	Driver	Points
1		(Switzerland) Philip Ellis (United States) Russell Ward	2090
2		(United States) Robby Foley (United States) Patrick Gallagher	1750
3		(Canada) Parker Thompson	1648
4	1	(Canada) Mikaël Grenier (United States) Mike Skeen	1521
5	1	(Spain) Albert Costa (United States) Manny Franco	1508

- Note: Only the top five positions are included for all sets of standings.

GTP Teams' Championship standings
Pos.	+/–	Team	Points
1		#7 Porsche Penske Motorsport	2044
2		#01 Cadillac Racing	1951
3		#6 Porsche Penske Motorsport	1912
4		#40 Wayne Taylor Racing with Andretti	1845
5		#31 Whelen Cadillac Racing	1838

LMP2 Teams' Championship standings
Pos.	+/–	Team	Points
1	1	#74 Riley	1308
2	1	#52 Inter Europol by PR1/Mathiasen Motorsports	1296
3	1	#18 Era Motorsport	1173
4		#22 United Autosports USA	1142
5	1	#11 TDS Racing	1125

GTD Pro Teams' Championship standings
Pos.	+/–	Team	Points
1		#77 AO Racing	1955
2	1	#23 Heart of Racing Team	1857
3	1	#14 Vasser Sullivan	1835
4	2	#3 Corvette Racing by Pratt Miller Motorsports	1774
5	1	#1 Paul Miller Racing	1679

GTD Teams' Championship standings
Pos.	+/–	Team	Points
1		#57 Winward Racing	2090
2		#96 Turner Motorsport	1750
3	1	#32 Korthoff/Preston Motorsports	1511
4	1	#34 Conquest Racing	1508
5	2	#12 Vasser Sullivan	1455

- Note: Only the top five positions are included for all sets of standings.

GTP Manufacturers' Championship standings
Pos.	+/–	Manufacturer	Points
1		(Germany) Porsche	2175
2		(United States) Cadillac	2134
3		(Japan) Acura	2061
4		(Germany) BMW	1880
5		(Italy) Lamborghini	572

GTD Pro Manufacturers' Championship standings
Pos.	+/–	Manufacturer	Points
1		(Germany) Porsche	2001
2	1	(United Kingdom) Aston Martin	1892
3	1	(Japan) Lexus	1879
4		(United States) Chevrolet	1859
5		(United Kingdom) McLaren	1743

GTD Manufacturers' Championship standings
Pos.	+/–	Manufacturer	Points
1		(Germany) Mercedes-AMG	2185
2		(Japan) Lexus	1788
3	2	(United Kingdom) Aston Martin	1765
4		(Italy) Lamborghini	1729
5	2	(Germany) Porsche	1721

- Note: Only the top five positions are included for all sets of standings.

IMSA SportsCar Championship
Previous race: Sahlen's Six Hours of The Glen	2024 season	Next race: IMSA SportsCar Weekend
