= AO Racing =

American racing team

(United States) AO Racing
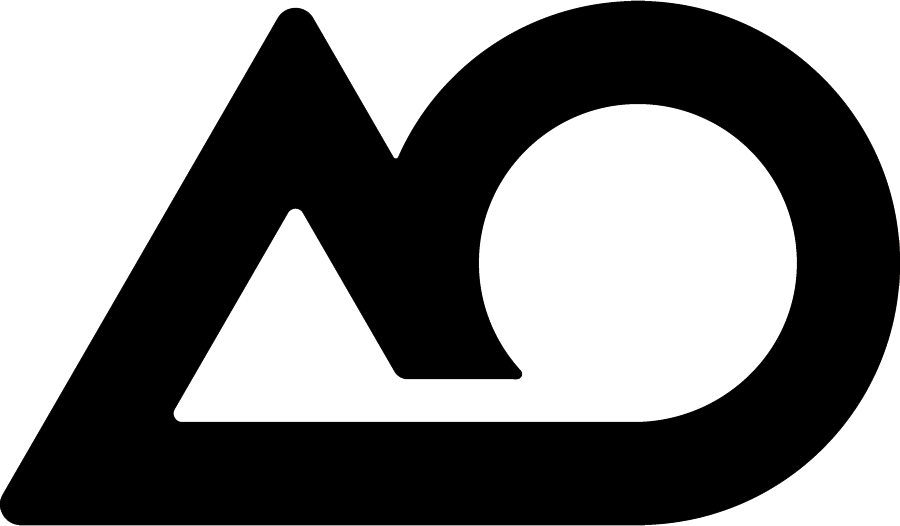
- Founded: 2022
- Founder(s): P. J. Hyett (owner); Gunnar Jeannette
- Base: St. Charles, Illinois, United States
- Team principal(s): Gunnar Jeannette
- Current series: European Le Mans Series; IMSA SportsCar Championship
- Former series: FIA World Endurance Championship
- Current drivers: IMSA SportsCar Championship: 77. (United Kingdom) Nick Tandy (United Kingdom) Harry King (Belgium) Alessio Picariello; 99. (United States) Dane Cameron (United Kingdom) Jonny Edgar (United States) P. J. Hyett (Denmark) Christian Rasmussen; 177. (United Kingdom) Jonny Edgar (Belgium) Laurens Vanthoor; European Le Mans Series: 99. (United States) Dane Cameron (Switzerland) Louis Delétraz (United States) P. J. Hyett
- Noted drivers: (United States) Gunnar Jeannette (United Kingdom) Sebastian Priaulx (Denmark) Michael Christensen (France) Julien Andlauer
- Teams' Championships: IMSA SportsCar Championship: 2024 (GTD Pro class): 2025 (LMP2 class); European Le Mans Series: 2024 (LMP2 class); 2025 (LMP2 Pro/Am class)
- Drivers' Championships: IMSA SportsCar Championship: 2024: Laurin Heinrich (GTD Pro class); 2025: Dane Cameron, P. J. Hyett (LMP2 class); European Le Mans Series: 2024: Louis Delétraz, Jonny Edgar, Robert Kubica (LMP2 class); 2025: Dane Cameron, Louis Delétraz, P. J. Hyett (LMP2 Pro/Am class)
- Website: https://aoracing.com/

Autumn Oaks Racing, doing business as AO Racing, is an American sports car racing team based in St. Charles, Illinois, established in 2022 by American software developer and entrepreneur P. J. Hyett and American racing driver Gunnar Jeannette. The team currently competes in the LMP2 and the GTD Pro classes of the IMSA SportsCar Championship and in LMP2 in the European Le Mans Series. AO Racing have previously competed in the FIA World Endurance Championship in a collaborative effort with Project 1 Motorsport. The team won the 2024 IMSA SportsCar Championship in the GTD Pro class with Porsche factory driver Laurin Heinrich.

== Background ==
AO Racing was founded in 2022 by GitHub co-founder and technology entrepreneur P. J. Hyett, and American race car driver Gunnar Jeannette. Hyett and Jeannette met through vintage racing and became friends. In September 2022, they made the decision to form an auto racing team to compete in the IMSA SportsCar Championship. The name AO is an abbreviation for Autumn Oaks, which is the name of Hyett's car collection.

=== Branding approach ===
In lieu of the conventional approach focusing on sponsor exposure and brand prestige, AO Racing promotes a playful and expressive brand personality, utilizing a dedicated canon, faux creature designs, and mascots with a large focus on fan engagement, a strategy which has allowed them to grow into a fan favorite team in sports car racing especially among families and children. The team operates a kids' club similar to professional sporting teams, with members receiving a merchandise pack and access to an exclusive garage tour and driver autograph session at most IMSA events. Hyett credits Jeannette for originating AO Racing's brand approach, stating that he had come up with the idea based on the public reception towards Hyett's race helmet. His race helmet includes a Tyrannosaurus rex and a unicorn on either side, a design he began using at the 2023 24 Hours of Daytona inspired by his son and daughter.

As of 2026, the team has four mascots, each represented on the cars that they use. "Rexy", a green male Tyrannosaurus rex, was created by designer T. J. Harley and first unveiled at the 2023 12 Hours of Sebring. "Roxy", a pink female Tyrannosaurus rex, was introduced five months later at the 2023 Michelin GT Challenge at VIR after the Rexy design was moved to AO Racing and Project 1 Motorsport's Porsche 911 RSR-19 for the 2023 FIA World Endurance Championship. Roxy has since reappeared as an occasional substitute to the team's full-time Rexy design in select races, which the team describe as Rexy "taking a vacation". "Spike", a purple and orange dragon, was introduced following the team's expansion into the LMP2 class for the 2024 IMSA SportsCar Championship. AO Racing describe Rexy and Roxy as siblings and Spike as their cousin. "Rockie", a red female winged horse based on Pegasus, was introduced ahead of the 2026 24 Hours of Le Mans as their LMP2 Pro-Am entry, stemming from the team's partnership with Mobil. Rockie made her IMSA debut at the 2026 Petit Le Mans.

AO Racing sometimes take creative liberties with their creature designs, including Halloween-themed skeleton liveries of both Rexy and Spike at Petit Le Mans, Rexy sporting boxing gloves and a mouthguard for the 2026 Detroit Sports Car Classic (referencing both the city's strong boxing history as well as the combative reputation of the street race), and a version of Spike featuring gold scales celebrating their 2025 IMSA SportsCar Championship LMP2 title. Rexy and Roxy are also altered to include golden teeth each time the team secures a race win, with a permanent gold tooth added following their 2024 IMSA season championship.

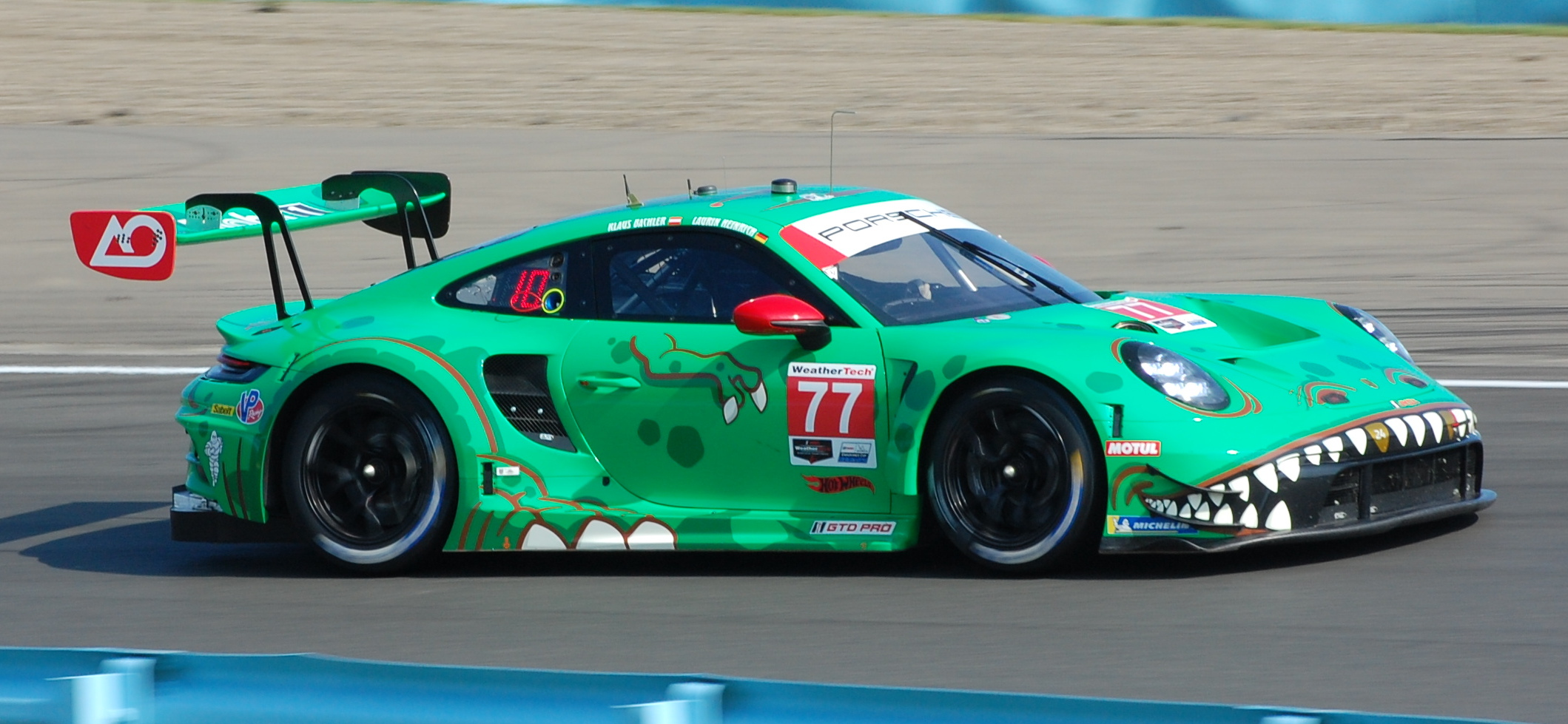
"Rexy", carrying a green male Tyrannosaurus rex theme.

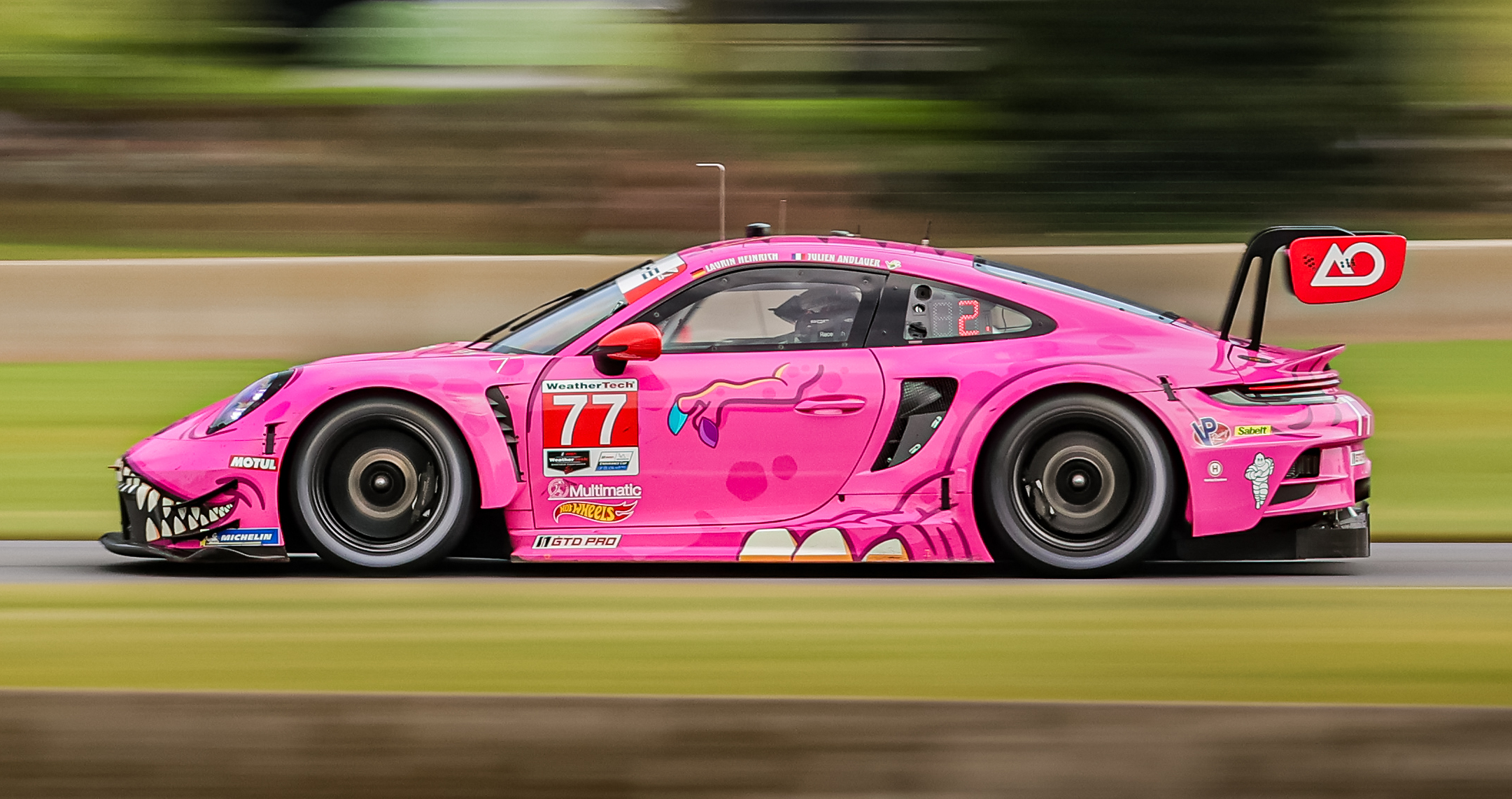
"Roxy", carrying a pink female Tyrannosaurus rex theme.

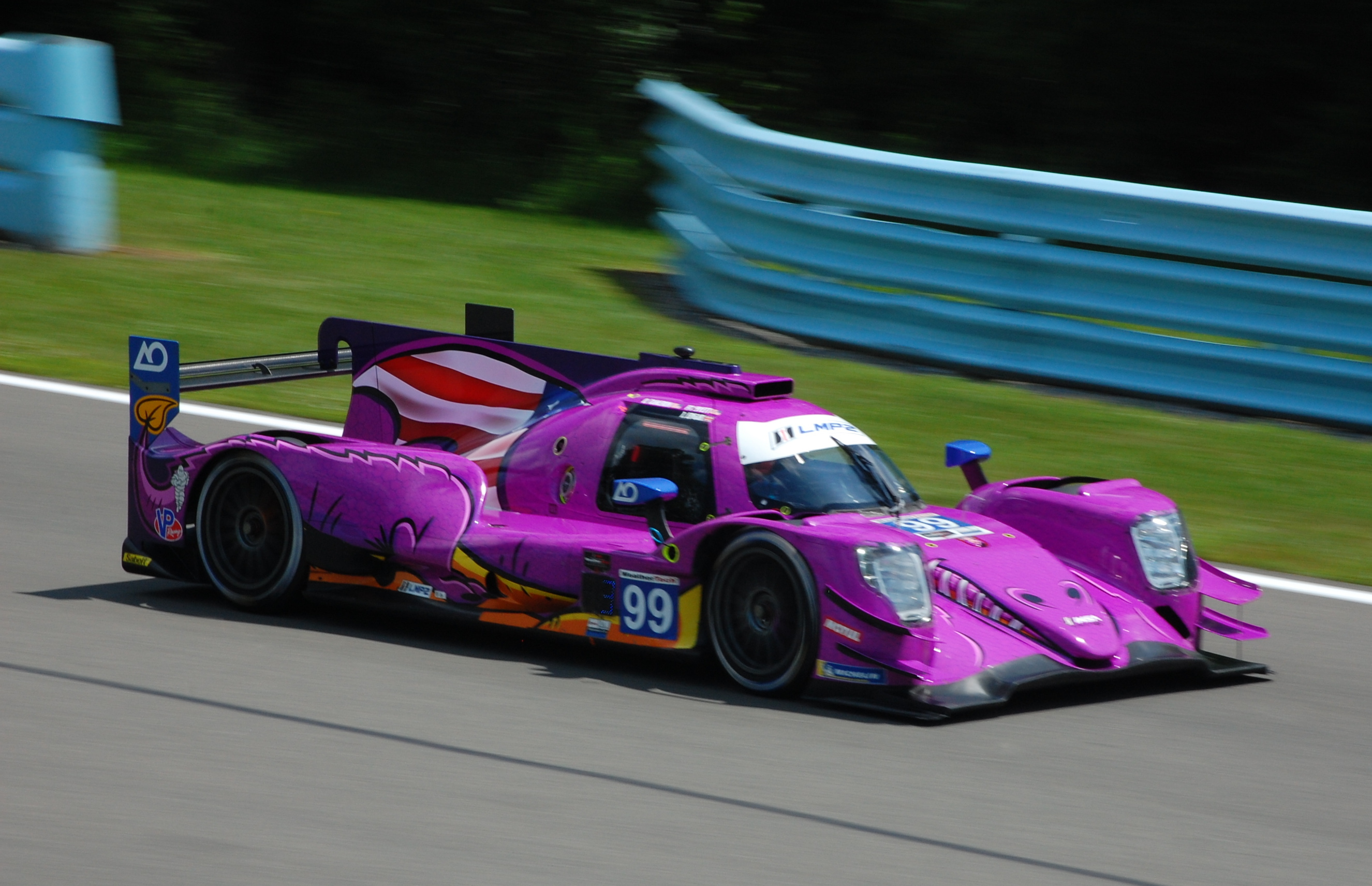
"Spike", carrying a purple and orange dragon theme.

== Racing history ==
=== European Le Mans Series ===
On November 29, 2023, the team announced that they would field an LMP2 entry in the 2024 European Le Mans Series season in partnership with TF Sport. The team signed Louis Delétraz, Jonny Edgar, and former Formula One driver Robert Kubica to drive the car full-time. Polish oil company Orlen would sponsor the car for the full season and the team would compete as Orlen Team AO by TF. The team would go on to win the LMP2 championship ahead of the No. 43 Inter Europol Competition entry.

The team returned to the European Le Mans Series for a second season in 2025, once again partnering with TF Sport. LMP2 class champion Louis Delétraz remained with the team, with team owner P. J. Hyett entering the series for the first time. The team would be competing in the LMP2 Pro-Am category as Hyett is an FIA Bronze driver.

=== FIA World Endurance Championship ===
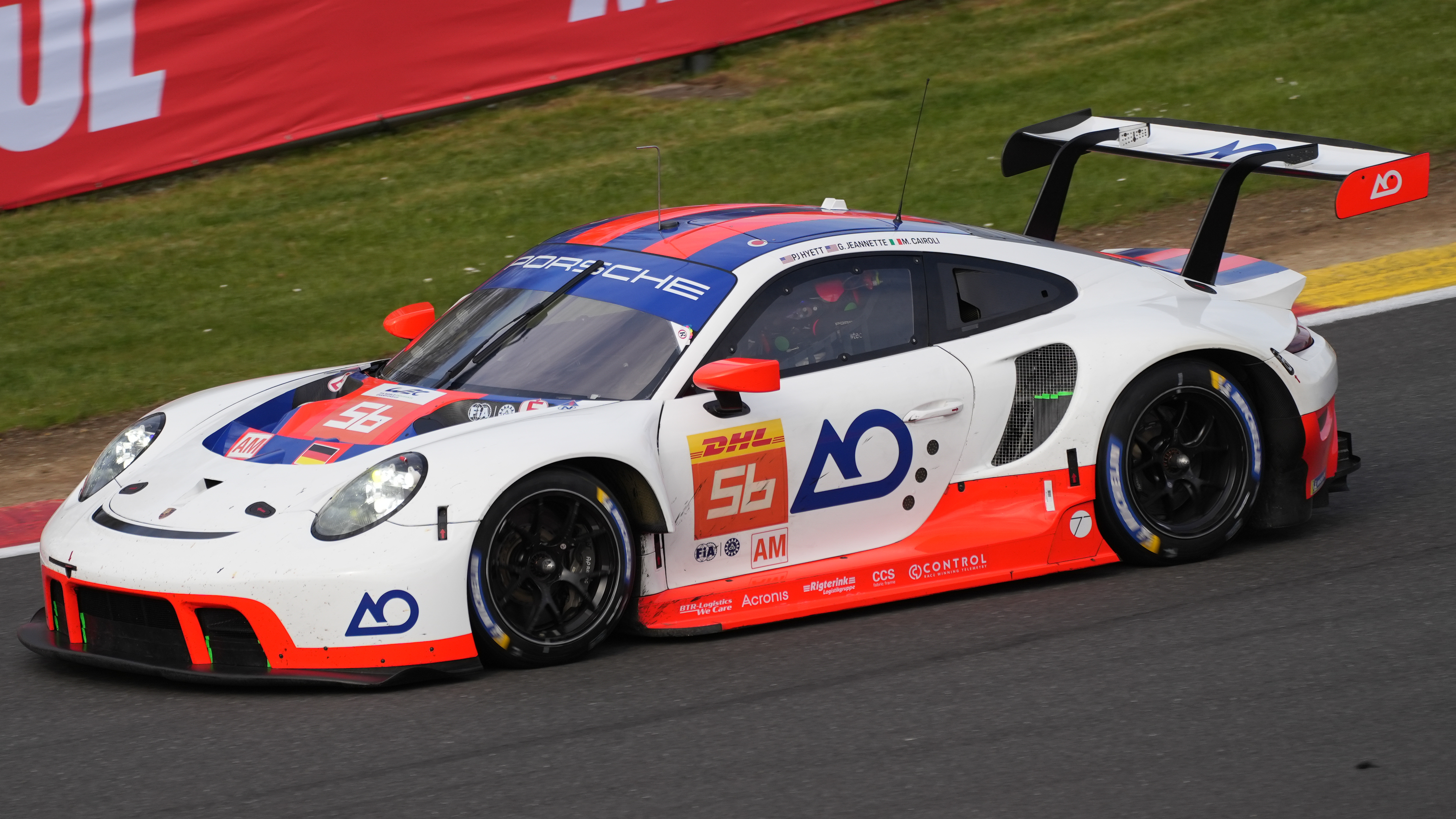
Project 1 – AO's No. 56 Porsche 911 RSR-19 at the 2023 6 Hours of Spa-Francorchamps.

In partnership with Project 1 Motorsport, AO Racing fielded a Porsche 911 RSR-19 in the 2023 FIA World Endurance Championship. At the third round of the series in the 2023 6 Hours of Spa-Francorchamps, the team were forced to withdraw following an accident suffered by P. J. Hyett in qualifying, evaluating that the chassis of their car was too damaged to race. The joint effort team were unable to collect high scoring results, which meant they finished 11th out of 14 teams in the LM GTE class standings. AO Racing effectively left the series after Project 1 Motorsport filed for bankruptcy in 2024.

=== IMSA SportsCar Championship ===
AO Racing completed their sports car racing debut at the 2023 24 Hours of Daytona, entering a Porsche 911 (992) GT3 R driven by Harry Tincknell, Sebastian Priaulx, and team founders Gunnar Jeannette and P. J. Hyett. The team sported a tribute livery based on the Porsche 935 from Henn's Swap Shop Racing that won the race 40 years prior. AO Racing experienced a difficult race, finishing 19 laps down on the GTD class winner.

At the 2023 12 Hours of Sebring, AO Racing unveiled "Rexy" for the first time as their new full-season livery, a design which would also become the basis for the team's bold brand personality. The livery, which received widespread fanfare for its unconventional theme in contrast to other competitors, was inspired by P. J. Hyett's two children, who had both influenced his helmet design which included a Tyrannosaurus rex and a unicorn. The race would prove difficult, finishing the race 16 laps down on the GTD leader. They would spend the 2023 IMSA SportsCar Championship in the midfield, completing the season 13th in class. Entering the 2024 IMSA SportsCar Championship, the team announced that they would field a second car, set to compete in the LMP2 class. The team's third mascot, "Spike", was revealed for the first time in the announcement, with AO Racing's new Oreca 07 wearing the purple and orange dragon themed livery. The team signed Matthew Brabham and Paul-Loup Chatin to partner P. J. Hyett for the full season in the LMP2 entry, with Alex Quinn joining the team for the Michelin Endurance Cup. The GTD Pro entry would see Michael Christensen, Laurin Heinrich, and Sebastian Priaulx drive the team's Porsche 911 GT3 R (992) for the full season. At the third round of the 2024 season at Laguna Seca, the team scored their first win as an organization in the GTD Pro class with Heinrich and Priaulx behind the wheel of "Rexy". After two further wins at Detroit and Indianapolis, the team, and subsequently Laurin Heinrich, became GTD Pro champions by four points at the last race at Road Atlanta.

AO Racing's "Skeleton Rexy" No. 77 Porsche 911 GT3 R (992) at the 2025 Petit Le Mans.

The team returned for the 2025 season once again competing in the LMP2 and GTD Pro classes. 2024 IMSA SportsCar Championship GTD Pro champion Laurin Heinrich remained with the team to drive the No. 77 Porsche 911 GT3 R. Joining him was Klaus Bachler, who drove the No. 77 Virginia International Raceway in 2024, and Belgian racer Alessio Picariello. For the No. 99 LMP2 entry, the team signed Dane Cameron, Jonny Edgar, and Christian Rasmussen to partner team owner P. J. Hyett. The No. 99 LMP2 car won the title in its class in the 2025 IMSA SportsCar Championship at the 2025 Petit Le Mans season finale.

The 2026 IMSA campaign saw a driver change for the GTD Pro team; Heinrich was promoted by Porsche to the GTP class and split time with the Penske factory team and the JDC–Miller MotorSports privateers, while Bachler transferred to fellow Porsche GTD Pro outfit Manthey Racing. British drivers Nick Tandy and Harry King piloted the No. 77 with Picariello joining them for the longer endurance races. The season saw both cars finish fourth in the overall standings; the GTD Pro team reached the podium five times but could not claim a class win, while the LMP2 car won the Six Hours of the Glen and finished third at Mosport but otherwise was kept off the podium.

=== Stéphane Ratel Organization ===
AO Racing made their SRO Intercontinental GT Challenge debut at the 2026 Suzuka 1000 km in partnership with Hong Kong-based team Absolute Racing. Regular AO IMSA driver Picariello was joined by Heinrich as well as fellow Porsche factory driver Julien Andlauer for the race, which saw AO also introduce a special livery named "Bushi Rex", described as "Rexy's ancient samurai ancestor". The trio piloted the No. 8 entry to victory from sixth place on the starting grid, in the process securing Porsche's first win at Suzuka since 1994.

The tie-up between AO and Absolute Racing will continue at the 2026 SRO FIA GT World Cup at Macau. Heinrich will drive the No. 8 car in another special livery, named Chìjīn (lit. "red and gold") Rex, in tribute to Chinese culture.

== Racing record ==
=== Complete IMSA SportsCar Championship results ===
(key) (Races in bold indicate pole position; races in italics indicate fastest lap)

Year	Entrant	Class	No	Chassis	Engine	Drivers	1	2	3	4	5	6	7	8	9	10	11	Pos.	Pts
2023							DAY	SEB	LBH	LGA	WGL	MOS	LIM	ELK	VIR	IMS	PET		
2023	(United States) AO Racing Team	GTD	80	Porsche 911 GT3 R (992)	Porsche M97/80 4.2 L Flat-6	(United States) P. J. Hyett (United States) Gunnar Jeannette (United Kingdom) Sebastian Priaulx (United Kingdom) Harry Tincknell	14	16	DNS	11	14	8	7	11	6	10	8	13th	2245
2024							DAY	SEB	LGA	DET	WGL	MOS		ELK	VIR	IMS	PET		
2024	(United States) AO Racing	LMP2	99	Oreca 07	Gibson GK428 4.2 L V8	(Australia) Matthew Brabham (France) Paul-Loup Chatin (United States) P. J. Hyett (United Kingdom) Alex Quinn	8	**Ret**			**7**	**8**		**3**		4	7	6th	1942
2024	(United States) AO Racing	GTD Pro	77	Porsche 911 GT3 R (992)	Porsche M97/80 4.2 L Flat-6	(France) Julien Andlauer (Austria) Klaus Bachler (Denmark) Michael Christensen (Germany) Laurin Heinrich (United Kingdom) Sebastian Priaulx	**2**	9	1	1	6	3		4	7	1	**11**	1st	3122
2025							DAY	SEB	LBH	LGA	DET	WGL	MOS	ELK	VIR	IMS	ATL		
2025	(United States) AO Racing	LMP2	99	Oreca 07	Gibson GK428 4.2 L V8	(United States) Dane Cameron (United Kingdom) Jonny Edgar (United States) P. J. Hyett (Denmark) Christian Rasmussen	5	7				**2**	**1**	**1**		5	6	1st	2254
2025	(United States) AO Racing	GTD Pro	77	Porsche 911 GT3 R (992)	Porsche M97/80 4.2 L Flat-6	(Austria) Klaus Bachler (Germany) Laurin Heinrich (Belgium) Alessio Picariello	8	1		1	5	5	3	8	5	7	8	5th	2963
2025	(United States) AO Racing	GTD	177	Porsche 911 GT3 R (992)	Porsche M97/80 4.2 L Flat-6	(United Kingdom) Jonny Edgar (Belgium) Laurens Vanthoor			1									21st	382
2026*							DAY	SEB	LBH	LGA	DET	WGL	MOS	ELK	VIR	IMS	ATL		
2026*	(United States) AO Racing	LMP2	99	Oreca 07	Gibson GK428 4.2 L V8	(United States) Dane Cameron (United Kingdom) Jonny Edgar (United States) P. J. Hyett (Denmark) Christian Rasmussen	5	6				1	3	4		8	10	4th	2087
2026*	(United States) AO Racing	GTD Pro	77	Porsche 911 GT3 R (992.2)	Porsche M97/80 4.2 L Flat-6	(United Kingdom) Nick Tandy (United Kingdom) Harry King (Belgium) Alessio Picariello	9	2		3	9	7	2	2	9	10	2	4th	2921
2026*	(United States) AO Racing	GTD	177	Porsche 911 GT3 R (992.2)	Porsche M97/80 4.2 L Flat-6	(United Kingdom) Harry King (Denmark) Mikkel O. Pedersen			13									22nd	202

* Season in progress.

=== Complete FIA World Endurance Championship results ===
(key) (Races in bold indicate pole position; races in italics indicate fastest lap)

Year	Entrant	Class	No	Chassis	Engine	Drivers	1	2	3	4	5	6	7	Pos.	Pts
2023							SEB	POR	SPA	LMN	MON	FUJ	BHR		
2023	(Germany) Project 1 - AO	LMGTE Am	56	Porsche 911 RSR-19	Porsche M97/80 4.2 L Flat-6	(Italy) Matteo Cairoli (United States) P. J. Hyett (United States) Gunnar Jeannette (Portugal) Guilherme Oliveira (Portugal) Miguel Ramos (Dominican Republic) Efrin Castro	12	6	WD	7	8	5	10	11th	36

=== 24 Hours of Le Mans results ===
Year	Entrant	No.	Car	Drivers	Class	Laps	Pos.	Class Pos.
2023	(Germany) Project 1 – AO	56	Porsche 911 RSR-19	(Italy) Matteo Cairoli (United States) P. J. Hyett (United States) Gunnar Jeannette	LMGTE Am	309	35th	7th
2024	(United States) AO by TF	14	Oreca 07-Gibson	(Switzerland) Louis Delétraz (United States) P. J. Hyett (United Kingdom) Alex Quinn	LMP2 (Pro-Am)	295	20th	**2nd**
2025	(United States) AO by TF	199	Oreca 07-Gibson	(United States) Dane Cameron (Switzerland) Louis Delétraz (United States) P. J. Hyett	LMP2 (Pro-Am)	366	20th	**1st**
2026	(United States) AO by TF	99	Oreca 07-Gibson	(Australia) James Allen (United States) Dane Cameron (United States) P. J. Hyett	LMP2 (Pro-Am)	356	24th	**3rd**

=== Complete European Le Mans Series results ===
(key) (Races in bold indicate pole position; races in italics indicate fastest lap)

Year	Entrant	Class	No	Chassis	Engine	Drivers	1	2	3	4	5	6	Pos.	Pts
2024							CAT	LEC	IMO	SPA	MUG	POR		
2024	(United States) Orlen Team AO by TF	LMP2	14	Oreca 07	Gibson GK428 4.2 L V8	(Switzerland) Louis Delétraz (United Kingdom) Jonny Edgar (Poland) Robert Kubica	7	3	2	**1**	5	2	1st	93
2025							CAT	LEC	IMO	SPA	SIL	POR		
2025	(United States) AO by TF	LMP2 Pro-Am	99	Oreca 07	Gibson GK428 4.2 L V8	(United States) Dane Cameron (Switzerland) Louis Delétraz (United States) P. J. Hyett	8	**2**	1	3	**2**	2	1st	100
2026*							BAR	LEC	IMO	SPA	SIL	POR		
2026*	(United States) AO by TF	LMP2 Pro-Am	99	Oreca 07	Gibson GK428 4.2 L V8	(United States) Dane Cameron (United States) P. J. Hyett (Switzerland) Louis Delétraz (United Kingdom) Jonny Edgar	10	**2**	9				9th	22

* Season in progress.

== Race Wins ==
=== Overall Wins ===
#	Season	Championship	Date	Classes	Track / Race	No.	Winning drivers	Chassis	Engine
1	2024	ELMS	August 25	LMP2	Circuit de Spa-Francorchamps	14	(United Kingdom) Jonny Edgar / (Switzerland) Louis Delétraz / (Poland) Robert Kubica	Oreca 07	Gibson GK428 4.2 L V8
2	2026	IGTC	September 13	GT3	Suzuka Circuit	8	(France) Julien Andlauer / (Germany) Laurin Heinrich / (Belgium) Alessio Picariello	Porsche 911 GT3 R (992)	Porsche M97/80 4.2 L Flat-6

=== Class Wins ===
#	Season	Championship	Date	Classes	Track / Race	No.	Winning drivers	Chassis	Engine
1	2024	IMSA	May 12	GTD Pro	Laguna Seca	77	(Germany) Laurin Heinrich / (United Kingdom) Sebastian Priaulx	Porsche 911 GT3 R (992)	Porsche M97/80 4.2 L Flat-6
2	2024	IMSA	June 1	GTD Pro	Detroit Street Circuit	77	(Germany) Laurin Heinrich / (United Kingdom) Sebastian Priaulx	Porsche 911 GT3 R (992)	Porsche M97/80 4.2 L Flat-6
3	2024	IMSA	September 22	GTD Pro	Indianapolis Motor Speedway	77	(Germany) Laurin Heinrich / (Denmark) Michael Christensen	Porsche 911 GT3 R (992)	Porsche M97/80 4.2 L Flat-6
4	2025	IMSA	March 15	GTD Pro	Sebring International Raceway	77	(Austria) Klaus Bachler / (Germany) Laurin Heinrich / (Belgium) Alessio Picariello	Porsche 911 GT3 R (992)	Porsche M97/80 4.2 L Flat-6
5	2025	IMSA	April 12	GTD	Long Beach Street Circuit	177	(United Kingdom) Jonny Edgar / (Belgium) Laurens Vanthoor	Porsche 911 GT3 R (992)	Porsche M97/80 4.2 L Flat-6
6	2025	IMSA	May 11	GTD Pro	Laguna Seca	77	(Austria) Klaus Bachler / (Germany) Laurin Heinrich	Porsche 911 GT3 R (992)	Porsche M97/80 4.2 L Flat-6
7	2025	N/A	June 14–15	LMP2 Pro-Am	Circuit de la Sarthe	199	(United States) Dane Cameron / (Switzerland) Louis Delétraz / (United States) P. J. Hyett	Oreca 07	Gibson GK428 4.2 L V8
8	2025	ELMS	July 6	LMP2 Pro-Am	Imola Circuit	99	(United States) Dane Cameron / (Switzerland) Louis Delétraz / (United States) P. J. Hyett	Oreca 07	Gibson GK428 4.2 L V8
9	2025	IMSA	July 13	LMP2	Canadian Tire Motorsports Park	99	(United States) Dane Cameron / (United States) P. J. Hyett	Oreca 07	Gibson GK428 4.2 L V8
10	2025	IMSA	August 3	LMP2	Road America	99	(United States) Dane Cameron / (United States) P. J. Hyett	Oreca 07	Gibson GK428 4.2 L V8
11	2026	IMSA	June 28	LMP2	Watkins Glen International	99	(United States) Dane Cameron / (United Kingdom) Jonny Edgar / (United States) P. J. Hyett	Oreca 07	Gibson GK428 4.2 L V8
