= 2023 Michelin GT Challenge at VIR =

Ninth round of the 2023 IMSA SportsCar Championship season

Track map of VIR

The 2023 Michelin GT Challenge at VIR was a sports car race sanctioned by the International Motor Sports Association (IMSA). The Race was held at Virginia International Raceway in Alton, Virginia on August 27, 2023. The event was the ninth round of the 2023 IMSA SportsCar Championship, and the sixth round of the WeatherTech Sprint Cup.

== Background ==
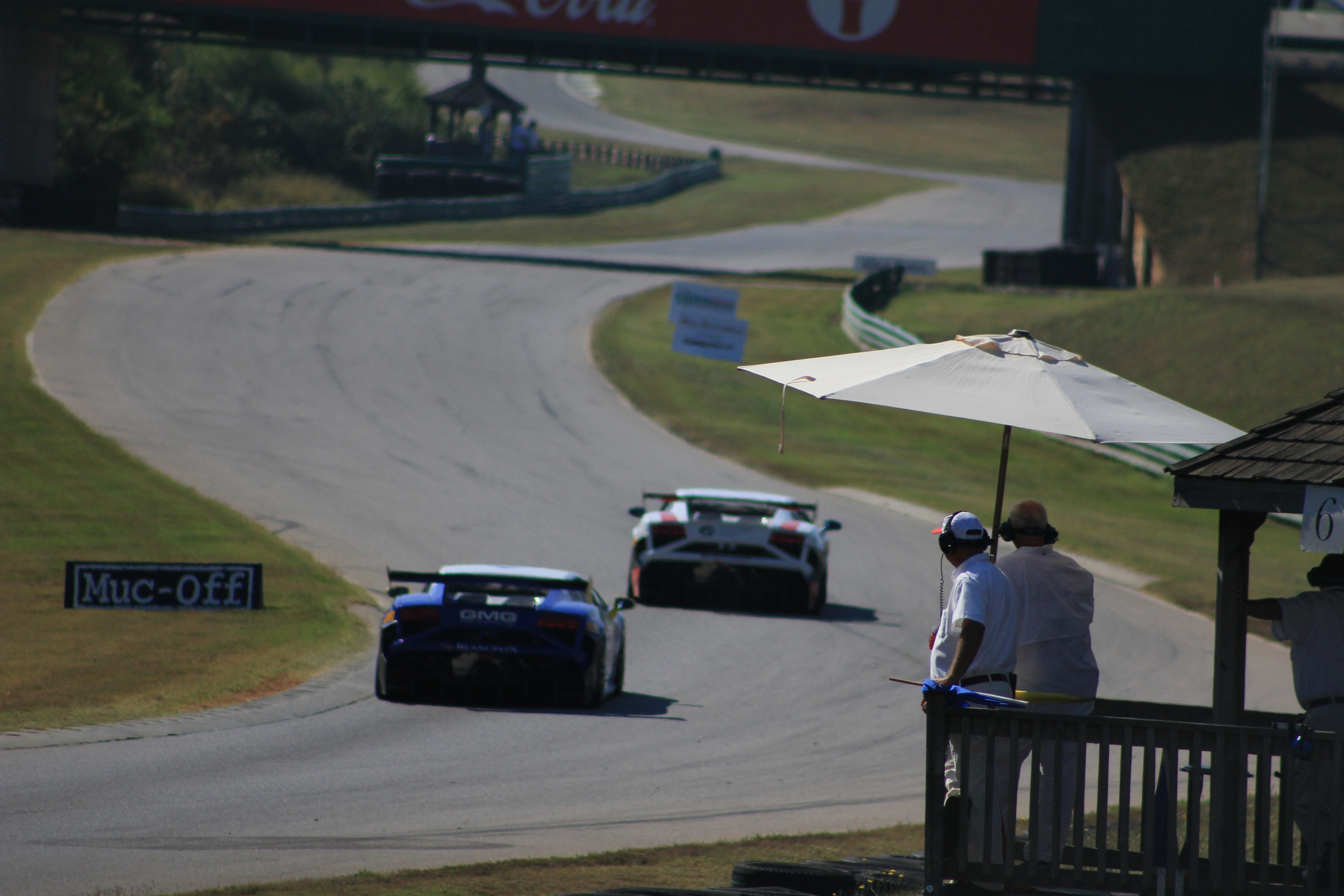
Virginia International Raceway, where the race was held.

International Motor Sports Association's (IMSA) president John Doonan confirmed the race was part of the schedule for the 2023 IMSA SportsCar Championship (IMSA SCC) in August 2022. It was the tenth consecutive year the event will be held as part of the WeatherTech SportsCar Championship. The 2023 Michelin GT Challenge at VIR was the ninth of eleven scheduled sports car races of 2023 by IMSA, and it was the sixth round held as part of the WeatherTech Sprint Cup. The race was held at the seventeen-turn 3.270 mi (5.263 km) Virginia International Raceway on August 27, 2023. As in previous years, it will be the second of two GT-only rounds of the IMSA SportsCar Championship, in which only the GTD Pro and GTD classes will compete.

IMSA released two separate technical bulletins regarding the Balance of Performance for the event. The first one was released on August 16, 2023. In this bulletin, the Aston Martin Vantage AMR GT3 received a 12-horsepower decrease, as well as a four-liter fuel capacity reduction. The second technical bulletin was released on August 18, 2023. In this bulletin, the Mercedes-AMG GT3 Evo received a 15 kilogram weight increase, as well as a 0.5 mm larger air restrictor and a one-liter fuel capacity increase. The Porsche 911 GT3 R (992) received a 10 kilogram weight increase, 2 mm larger air restrictor, and an increase in fuel capacity of one liter.

Before the race, Ben Barnicoat and Jack Hawksworth led the GTD Pro Drivers' Championship with 2810 points, ahead of Antonio García and Jordan Taylor in second with 2641 points, and Jules Gounon and Daniel Juncadella in third. In GTD, the Drivers' Championship was led by Bryan Sellers and Madison Snow with 2611 points, ahead of Roman De Angelis and Marco Sørensen with 2406 points. Lexus and BMW were leading their respective Manufacturers' Championships, while Vasser Sullivan Racing and Paul Miller Racing each led their own Teams' Championships.

=== Entries ===
A total of 19 cars took part in the event split across two classes. 5 cars are entered in GTD Pro and 14 in GTD. Andretti Autosport skipped the event.

== Practice and qualifying ==
There were two practice sessions preceding the race start on Sunday, one on Friday afternoon and one on Saturday morning. The first session on Friday afternoon ran for 90 minutes while the second session on Saturday morning ran for 105 minutes.

In the first session, Ben Barnicoat's No. 14 Lexus lapped quickest at 1 minute, 45.201 seconds. Patrick Pilet's No. 9 Pfaff Porsche was second-fastest. Antonio García was third in Corvette's No. 3 car. GTD was led by Patrick Gallagher in Turner Motorsport's No. 96 car with a 1:45.234 lap, 0.160 seconds ahead of Aaron Telitz in VSR's No. 12 Lexus. Winward's Philip Ellis was third. Frederik Schandorff's No. 70 McLaren, along with Bryan Sellers' No. 1 Paul Miller BMW were fourth and fifth. The No. 79 WeatherTech Racing Mercedes of Daniel Juncadella caught fire in the pitlane in the closing minutes.

Juncadella led the final session with a lap of 1 minute, 44.539 seconds. Hawksworth was 0.030 seconds behind in second, with the No. 3 Corvette of García in third. Snow led GTD in Paul Miller's No. 1 BMW, 0.069 seconds ahead of Gallagher in Turner Motorsport's No. 96 BMW. Grenier was third in the No. 32 Korthoff Mercedes-AMG. Ward placed the No. 57 Winward Mercedes-AMG in fourth.

Saturday’s afternoon qualifying was broken into one sessions for the GTD Pro and GTD classes, which lasted for 15 minutes. The rules dictated that all teams nominated a driver to qualify their cars. The competitors' fastest lap times determined the starting order.

Jack Hawksworth for VSR took his third pole position of the season, and the tenth of his career, with a time of 1 minute, 44.780 seconds. He was joined on the grid's front row by Daniel Juncadella whose best lap in the No. 79 WeatherTech Mercedes-AMG was 0.096 seconds slower, and Antonio García drove the No. 3 Corvette to third. The Pffaf Motorsports Porsche and the No. 23 Heart Aston Martin rounded out the GTD Pro qualifiers. In GTD, snow took his second pole position of the season, and the eleventh of his career with a lap of 1 minute and 45.225 seconds. He was joined by Telitz's No. 12 Lexus on grid's the front row with his best lap being 0.153 second slower, and Loris Spinelli drove the No. 78 Forte Racing Lamborghini to third place. Following in fourth was Skeen's No. 32 Korthoff Mercedes-AMG, with Gallagher's slower No. 96 Turner BMW in fifth.

=== Qualifying results ===
Pole positions in each class are indicated in bold and by ‡.

Pos.	Class	No.	Team	Driver	Time	Gap	Grid
1	**GTD Pro**	**14**	**(United States) Vasser Sullivan Racing**	**(United Kingdom) Jack Hawksworth**	**1:44.780**	**_**	1‡
2	GTD Pro	79	(United States) WeatherTech Racing	(Spain) Daniel Juncadella	1:44.876	+0.096	2
3	GTD Pro	3	(United States) Corvette Racing	(Spain) Antonio García	1:45.133	+0.353	3
4	**GTD**	**1**	**(United States) Paul Miller Racing**	**(United States) Madison Snow**	**1:45.225**	**+0.445**	4‡
5	GTD	12	(United States) Vasser Sullivan Racing	(United States) Aaron Telitz	1:45.378	+0.598	5
6	GTD	78	(United States) Forte Racing powered by US RaceTronics	(Italy) Loris Spinelli	1:45.416	+0.636	6
7	GTD	32	(United States) Team Korthoff Motorsports	(United States) Mike Skeen	1:45.447	+0.667	7
8	GTD	96	(United States) Turner Motorsport	(United States) Patrick Gallagher	1:45.913	+1.133	8
9	GTD	27	(United States) Heart of Racing Team	(Canada) Roman De Angelis	1:45.918	+1.138	9
10	GTD Pro	9	(Canada) Pfaff Motorsports	(France) Patrick Pilet	1:45.974	+1.194	10
11	GTD Pro	23	(United States) Heart of Racing Team	(United Kingdom) Ross Gunn	1:45.977	+1.197	11
12	GTD	70	(United Kingdom) Inception Racing	(United States) Brendan Iribe	1:46.098	+1.318	12
13	GTD	57	(United States) Winward Racing	(United States) Russell Ward	1:46.271	+1.491	13
14	GTD	97	(United States) Turner Motorsport	(United States) Chandler Hull	1:46.919	+2.139	14
15	GTD	66	(United States) Gradient Racing	(United States) Sheena Monk	1:47.504	+2.724	15
16	GTD	80	(United States) AO Racing Team	(United States) P.J. Hyett	1:47.544	+2.764	16
17	GTD	91	(United States) Kelly-Moss with Riley	(United States) Alan Metni	1:47.635	+2.855	17
18	GTD	77	(United States) Wright Motorsports	(United States) Alan Brynjolfsson	1:48.047	+3.267	18
19	GTD	92	(United States) Kelly-Moss with Riley	(United States) David Brule	1:49.230	+4.450	19

== Warm up ==
A 20-minute morning warm-up session was held on the morning of August 27. Antonio García led GTD Pro with a lap time of 1:46.295, 0.055 seconds ahead of Jules Gounon. Frederik Schandorff set the fastest time amongst all GTD cars.

== Race ==
=== Post-race ===
The result kept Barnicoat and Hawksworth atop the GTD Pro Drivers' Championship. Bachler and Pilet advanced from fourth to third while Gounon and Juncadella dropped from third to fourth. With 2996 points, Sellers and Snow's victory allowed them to increase their advantage over De Angelis and Sørensen in the GTD Drivers' Championship. Foley and Gallagher advanced from seventh to fifth while Iribe and Schandorff dropped from third to fourth. Lexus and BMW continued to top their respective Manufacturers' Championships, while Vasser Sullivan Racing, and Paul Miller Racing kept their respective advantages in their respective of Teams' Championships with two rounds remaining in the season.

=== Race Result ===
Class winners are in bold and ‡.

Pos	Class	No	Team	Drivers	Chassis	Laps	Time/Retired
Pos	Class	No	Team	Drivers	Engine	Laps	Time/Retired
1	**GTD Pro**	**3**	**(United States) Corvette Racing**	**(Spain) Antonio García (United States) Jordan Taylor**	**Chevrolet Corvette C8.R GTD**	**81**	**2:41:28.719‡**
1	**GTD Pro**	**3**	**(United States) Corvette Racing**	**(Spain) Antonio García (United States) Jordan Taylor**	**Chevrolet 5.5 L V8**	**81**	**2:41:28.719‡**
2	GTD Pro	14	(United States) Vasser Sullivan Racing	(United Kingdom) Ben Barnicoat (United Kingdom) Jack Hawksworth	Lexus RC F GT3	81	+2.068
2	GTD Pro	14	(United States) Vasser Sullivan Racing	(United Kingdom) Ben Barnicoat (United Kingdom) Jack Hawksworth	Toyota 2UR 5.0 L V8	81	+2.068
3	**GTD**	**1**	**(United States) Paul Miller Racing**	**(United States) Bryan Sellers (United States) Madison Snow**	**BMW M4 GT3**	**81**	**+17.261‡**
3	**GTD**	**1**	**(United States) Paul Miller Racing**	**(United States) Bryan Sellers (United States) Madison Snow**	**BMW S58B30T0 3.0 L Turbo I6**	**81**	**+17.261‡**
4	GTD	96	(United States) Turner Motorsport	(United States) Robby Foley (United States) Patrick Gallagher	BMW M4 GT3	81	+29.448
4	GTD	96	(United States) Turner Motorsport	(United States) Robby Foley (United States) Patrick Gallagher	BMW S58B30T0 3.0 L Turbo I6	81	+29.448
5	GTD	57	(United States) Winward Racing	(United Kingdom) Philip Ellis (United States) Russell Ward	Mercedes-AMG GT3 Evo	81	+33.223
5	GTD	57	(United States) Winward Racing	(United Kingdom) Philip Ellis (United States) Russell Ward	Mercedes-AMG M159 6.2 L V8	81	+33.223
6	GTD	97	(United States) Turner Motorsport	(United States) Bill Auberlen (United States) Chandler Hull	BMW M4 GT3	81	+38.346
6	GTD	97	(United States) Turner Motorsport	(United States) Bill Auberlen (United States) Chandler Hull	BMW S58B30T0 3.0 L Turbo I6	81	+38.346
7	GTD	12	(United States) Vasser Sullivan Racing	(United States) Frankie Montecalvo (United States) Aaron Telitz	Lexus RC F GT3	81	+43.073
7	GTD	12	(United States) Vasser Sullivan Racing	(United States) Frankie Montecalvo (United States) Aaron Telitz	Toyota 2UR 5.0 L V8	81	+43.073
8	GTD	80	(United States) AO Racing Team	(United States) P.J. Hyett (United Kingdom) Sebastian Priaulx	Porsche 911 GT3 R (992)	81	+44.575
8	GTD	80	(United States) AO Racing Team	(United States) P.J. Hyett (United Kingdom) Sebastian Priaulx	Porsche 4.2 L Flat-6	81	+44.575
9	GTD	70	(United Kingdom) Inception Racing	(United States) Brendan Iribe (Denmark) Frederik Schandorff	McLaren 720S GT3 Evo	81	+48.144
9	GTD	70	(United Kingdom) Inception Racing	(United States) Brendan Iribe (Denmark) Frederik Schandorff	McLaren M840T 4.0 L Turbo V8	81	+48.144
10	GTD	91	(United States) Kelly-Moss with Riley	(Netherlands) Kay van Berlo (United States) Alan Metni	Porsche 911 GT3 R (992)	81	+50.818
10	GTD	91	(United States) Kelly-Moss with Riley	(Netherlands) Kay van Berlo (United States) Alan Metni	Porsche 4.2 L Flat-6	81	+50.818
11	GTD	77	(United States) Wright Motorsports	(United States) Alan Brynjolfsson (United States) Trent Hindman	Porsche 911 GT3 R (992)	81	+58.899
11	GTD	77	(United States) Wright Motorsports	(United States) Alan Brynjolfsson (United States) Trent Hindman	Porsche 4.2 L Flat-6	81	+58.899
12	GTD Pro	9	(Canada) Pfaff Motorsports	(Austria) Klaus Bachler (France) Patrick Pilet	Porsche 911 GT3 R (992)	81	+1:03.366
12	GTD Pro	9	(Canada) Pfaff Motorsports	(Austria) Klaus Bachler (France) Patrick Pilet	Porsche 4.2 L Flat-6	81	+1:03.366
13	GTD	66	(United States) Gradient Racing	(United Kingdom) Katherine Legge (United States) Sheena Monk	Acura NSX GT3 Evo22	81	+1:05.530
13	GTD	66	(United States) Gradient Racing	(United Kingdom) Katherine Legge (United States) Sheena Monk	Acura 3.5 L Turbo V6	81	+1:05.530
14	GTD	32	(United States) Team Korthoff Motorsports	(Canada) Mikaël Grenier (United States) Mike Skeen	Mercedes-AMG GT3 Evo	81	+1:15.565
14	GTD	32	(United States) Team Korthoff Motorsports	(Canada) Mikaël Grenier (United States) Mike Skeen	Mercedes-AMG M159 6.2 L V8	81	+1:15.565
15	GTD Pro	23	(United States) Heart of Racing Team	(United Kingdom) Ross Gunn (Spain) Alex Riberas	Aston Martin Vantage AMR GT3	81	+1:19.046
15	GTD Pro	23	(United States) Heart of Racing Team	(United Kingdom) Ross Gunn (Spain) Alex Riberas	Aston Martin 4.0 L Turbo V8	81	+1:19.046
16	GTD	27	(United States) Heart of Racing Team	(Canada) Roman De Angelis (Denmark) Marco Sørensen	Aston Martin Vantage AMR GT3	81	+1:38.403
16	GTD	27	(United States) Heart of Racing Team	(Canada) Roman De Angelis (Denmark) Marco Sørensen	Aston Martin 4.0 L Turbo V8	81	+1:38.403
17	GTD Pro	79	(United States) WeatherTech Racing	(Andorra) Jules Gounon (Spain) Daniel Juncadella	Mercedes-AMG GT3 Evo	79	+2 Laps
17	GTD Pro	79	(United States) WeatherTech Racing	(Andorra) Jules Gounon (Spain) Daniel Juncadella	Mercedes-AMG M159 6.2 L V8	79	+2 Laps
18 DNF	GTD	78	(United States) Forte Racing powered by US RaceTronics	(Canada) Misha Goikhberg (Italy) Loris Spinelli	Lamborghini Huracán GT3 Evo 2	28	Did Not Finish
18 DNF	GTD	78	(United States) Forte Racing powered by US RaceTronics	(Canada) Misha Goikhberg (Italy) Loris Spinelli	Lamborghini 5.2 L V10	28	Did Not Finish
19 DNF	GTD	92	(United States) Kelly-Moss with Riley	(United States) David Brule (United States) Alec Udell	Porsche 911 GT3 R (992)	4	Did Not Finish
19 DNF	GTD	92	(United States) Kelly-Moss with Riley	(United States) David Brule (United States) Alec Udell	Porsche 4.2 L Flat-6	4	Did Not Finish

== Standings after the race ==
GTP Drivers' Championship standings
Pos.	+/–	Driver	Points
1		(Portugal) Filipe Albuquerque (United States) Ricky Taylor	2171
2		(Brazil) Pipo Derani (United Kingdom) Alexander Sims	2157
3		(United States) Connor De Phillippi (United Kingdom) Nick Yelloly	2098
4		(United Kingdom) Nick Tandy (France) Mathieu Jaminet	2073
5		(United Kingdom) Tom Blomqvist (United States) Colin Braun	2053

LMP2 Drivers' Championship standings
Pos.	+/–	Driver	Points
1		(France) Paul-Loup Chatin (United States) Ben Keating	1345
2		(Denmark) Mikkel Jensen (United States) Steven Thomas	1300
3		(United Kingdom) Ben Hanley (United States) George Kurtz	1248
4		(Netherlands) Giedo van der Garde	1194
5		(United Kingdom) Ryan Dalziel (United States) Dwight Merriman	1182

LMP3 Drivers' Championship standings
Pos.	+/–	Driver	Points
1		(United States) Gar Robinson	1495
2		(United Kingdom) Matt Bell (Canada) Orey Fidani	1244
3		(Canada) Garett Grist	1233
4		(United Kingdom) Wayne Boyd (Canada) Anthony Mantella	1218
5		(Portugal) João Barbosa	1143

GTD Pro Drivers' Championship standings
Pos.	+/–	Driver	Points
1		(United Kingdom) Ben Barnicoat (United Kingdom) Jack Hawksworth	3165
2		(Spain) Antonio García (United States) Jordan Taylor	3021
3	1	(Austria) Klaus Bachler (France) Patrick Pilet	2915
4	1	(Andorra) Jules Gounon (Spain) Daniel Juncadella	2886
5		(United Kingdom) Ross Gunn (Spain) Alex Riberas	2774

GTD Drivers' Championship standings
Pos.	+/–	Driver	Points
1		(United States) Bryan Sellers (United States) Madison Snow	2996
2		(Canada) Roman De Angelis (Denmark) Marco Sørensen	2621
3	1	(United States) Aaron Telitz (United States) Frankie Montecalvo	2553
4	1	(United States) Brendan Iribe (Denmark) Frederik Schandorff	2536
5	2	(United States) Robby Foley (United States) Patrick Gallagher	2298

- Note: Only the top five positions are included for all sets of standings.

GTP Teams' Championship standings
Pos.	+/–	Team	Points
1		(United States) #10 WTR with Andretti Autosport	2171
2		(United States) #31 Whelen Engineering Racing	2157
3		(United States) #25 BMW M Team RLL	2098
4		(Germany) #6 Porsche Penske Motorsport	2073
5		(United States) #60 Meyer Shank Racing with Curb-Agajanian	2053

LMP2 Teams' Championship standings
Pos.	+/–	Team	Points
1		(United States) #52 PR1/Mathiasen Motorsports	1345
2		(France) #11 TDS Racing	1300
3		(United States) #04 CrowdStrike Racing by APR	1248
4		(United States) #8 Tower Motorsports	1201
5		(France) #35 TDS Racing	1194

LMP3 Teams' Championship standings
Pos.	+/–	Team	Points
1		(United States) #74 Riley Motorsports	1495
2		(Canada) #13 AWA	1244
3		(United States) #30 Jr III Motorsports	1233
4		(Canada) #17 AWA	1218
5		(United States) #33 Sean Creech Motorsport	1143

GTD Pro Teams' Championship standings
Pos.	+/–	Team	Points
1		(United States) #14 Vasser Sullivan Racing	3165
2		(United States) #3 Corvette Racing	3021
3	1	(Canada) #9 Pfaff Motorsports	2915
4	1	(United States) #79 WeatherTech Racing	2886
5		(United States) #23 Heart of Racing Team	2774

GTD Teams' Championship standings
Pos.	+/–	Team	Points
1		(United States) #1 Paul Miller Racing	2996
2		(United States) #27 Heart of Racing Team	2621
3	1	(United States) #12 Vasser Sullivan Racing	2553
4	1	(United Kingdom) #70 Inception Racing	2536
5	2	(United States) #96 Turner Motorsport	2298

- Note: Only the top five positions are included for all sets of standings.

GTP Manufacturers' Championship standings
Pos.	+/–	Manufacturer	Points
1		(United States) Cadillac	2414
2		(Japan) Acura	2379
3		(Germany) Porsche	2367
4		(Germany) BMW	2340

GTD Pro Manufacturers' Championship standings
Pos.	+/–	Manufacturer	Points
1		(Japan) Lexus	3165
2		(United States) Chevrolet	3021
3	1	(Germany) Porsche	2915
4	1	(Germany) Mercedes-AMG	2886
5		(United Kingdom) Aston Martin	2785

GTD Manufacturers' Championship standings
Pos.	+/–	Manufacturer	Points
1		(Germany) BMW	3205
2		(United Kingdom) Aston Martin	2861
3	2	(Japan) Lexus	2763
4	1	(United Kingdom) McLaren	2754
5	1	(Germany) Porsche	2750

- Note: Only the top five positions are included for all sets of standings.

IMSA SportsCar Championship
Previous race: 2023 IMSA SportsCar Weekend	2023 season	Next race: 2023 IMSA Battle on the Bricks
