= 2023 Northeast Grand Prix =

Seventh round of the 2023 IMSA SportsCar Championship season

Track map of Lime Rock Park

The 2023 Northeast Grand Prix was a sports car race sanctioned by the International Motor Sports Association (IMSA). The race was held at Lime Rock Park in Lakeville, Connecticut, on July 22, 2023. The race was seventh round of the 2023 IMSA SportsCar Championship, and the fourth round of the 2023 WeatherTech Sprint Cup.

== Background ==
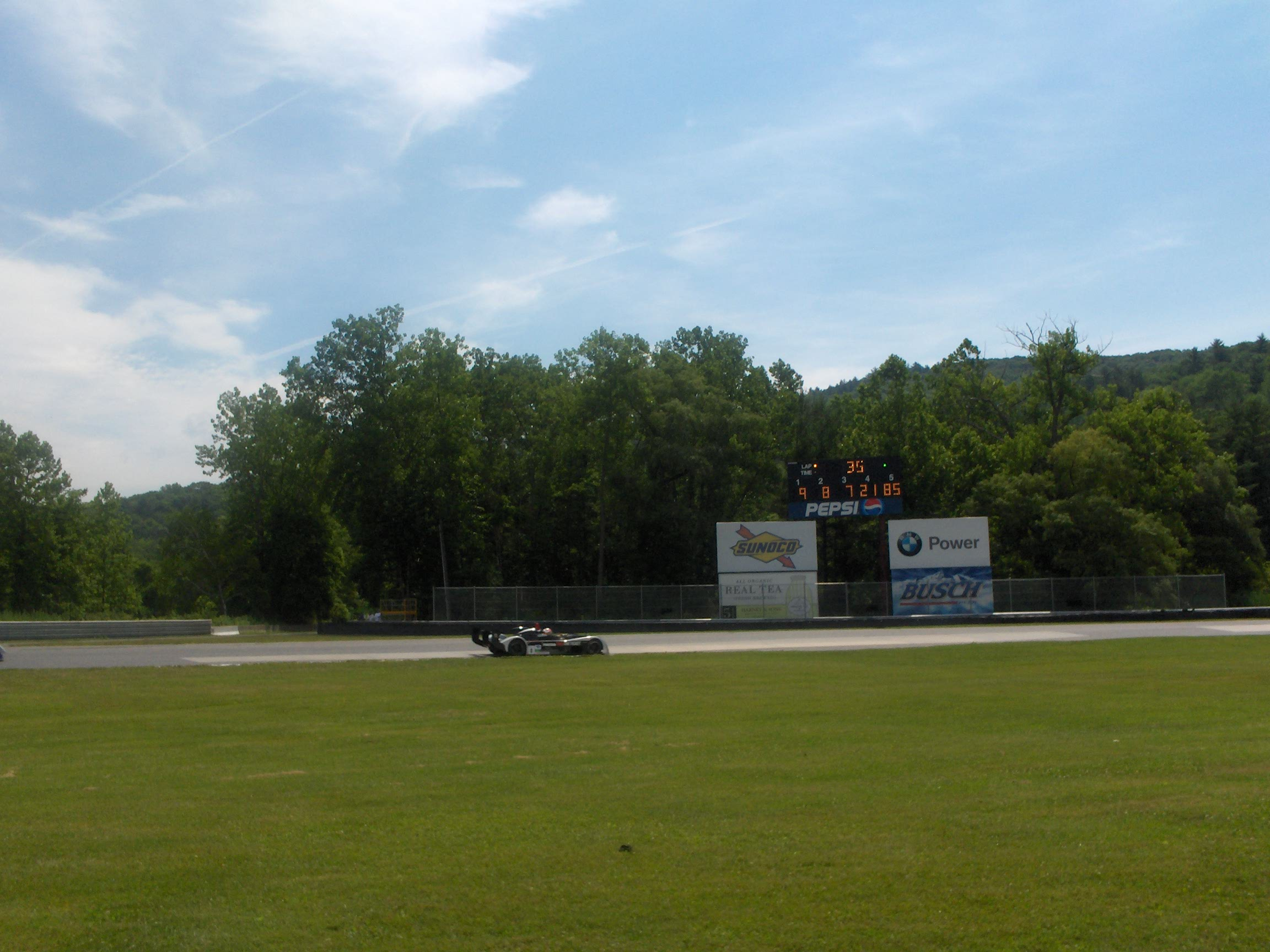
Lime Rock Park, where the race was held.

International Motor Sports Association's (IMSA) president John Doonan confirmed the race was part of the schedule for the 2023 IMSA SportsCar Championship (IMSA SCC) in August 2022. It was the eighth year the event was held as part of the WeatherTech SportsCar Championship and the thirty-first annual running of the race. The 2023 Northeast Grand Prix was the seventh of eleven scheduled sports car races of 2023 by IMSA, and it was the fourth round held as part of the WeatherTech Sprint Cup. The race was held at the seven-turn 1.530 mi (2.462 km) Lime Rock Park on July 22, 2023. As in previous years, it was the first of two GT-only rounds of the IMSA SportsCar Championship, in which only the GTD Pro and GTD classes will compete.

After the Chevrolet Grand Prix 13 days earlier, Ben Barnicoat and Jack Hawksworth led the GTD Pro Drivers' Championship with 2110 points, ahead of Jules Gounon and Daniel Juncadella with 2014 points followed by Antonio García and Jordan Taylor with 2001 points. With 1974 points, Bryan Sellers and Madison Snow led the GTD Drivers' Championship by 212 points over Roman De Angelis and Marco Sørensen. Lexus and BMW were leading their respective Manufacturers' Championships, while Vasser Sullivan Racing and Paul Miller Racing each led their own Teams' Championships.

On July 13, 2023, IMSA released the latest technical bulletin outlining Balance of Performance for the GTD Pro, and GTD classes. The Mercedes-AMG GT3 Evo received a 10 kilogram weight increase and gained 5.9 horsepower as well as 1 liter of fuel capacity. The Porsche 911 GT3 R (992) received a 20 kilogram weight reduction.

== Entries ==
A total of 20 cars took part in the event split across two classes. 5 cars were entered in GTD Pro, and 15 in GTD. In GTD, Andretti Autosport made their first appearance since the Laguna Seca round. Julien Andlauer returned to the No. 92 Kelly-Moss with Riley entry.

== Practice ==
There were two practice sessions preceding the start of the race on Saturday, two on Friday. The first session lasted an hour on Friday morning while the second session lasted for 75 minutes on Friday afternoon.

=== Practice 1 ===
The first practice session took place at 11:45 am ET and ended with Aaron Telitz topping the charts for Vasser Sullivan Racing, with a lap time of 51.762. Antonio García set the fastest time in GTD Pro.

Pos.	Class	No.	Team	Driver	Time	Gap
1	GTD	12	Vasser Sullivan Racing	Aaron Telitz	51.762	_
2	GTD Pro	3	Corvette Racing	Antonio García	51.821	+0.059
3	GTD	78	Forte Racing powered by US RaceTronics	Misha Goikhberg	51.832	+0.070

=== Practice 2 ===
The second and final practice session took place at 2:45 pm ET and ended with Antonio García topping the charts for Corvette Racing, with a lap time of 51.029. Frederik Schandorff set the fastest time in GTD.

Pos.	Class	No.	Team	Driver	Time	Gap
1	GTD Pro	3	Corvette Racing	Antonio García	51.029	_
2	GTD Pro	14	Vasser Sullivan Racing	Jack Hawksworth	51.155	+0.126
3	GTD Pro	9	Pfaff Motorsports	Patrick Pilet	51.195	+0.166

== Qualifying ==
Qualifying featured one session. The only session was for cars in the GTD Pro and GTD classes. Ross Gunn qualified on pole in GTD Pro driving the No. 23 Heart of Racing Team car, beating Jack Hawksworth in the No. 14 Vasser Sullivan Racing by just under two tenths of a second. Mike Skeen qualified on pole in GTD driving the No. 32 car for Team Korthoff Motorsports, besting Frederik Schandorff in the Inception Racing entry.

=== Qualifying results ===
Pole positions in each class are indicated in bold and by ‡.

Pos.	Class	No.	Team	Driver	Time	Gap	Grid
1	**GTD Pro**	**23**	**(United States) Heart of Racing Team**	**(United Kingdom) Ross Gunn**	**50.593**	**_**	1‡
2	GTD Pro	14	(United States) Vasser Sullivan Racing	(United Kingdom) Jack Hawksworth	50.784	+0.191	2
3	GTD Pro	3	(United States) Corvette Racing	(Spain) Antonio García	50.897	+0.304	3
4	GTD Pro	79	(United States) WeatherTech Racing	(Andorra) Jules Gounon	50.932	+0.339	4
5	GTD Pro	9	(Canada) Pfaff Motorsports	(France) Patrick Pilet	51.074	+0.481	5
6	**GTD**	**32**	**(United States) Team Korthoff Motorsports**	**(United States) Mike Skeen**	**51.157**	**+0.564**	6‡
7	GTD	70	(United Kingdom) Inception Racing	(Denmark) Frederik Schandorff	51.164	+0.571	7
8	GTD	78	(United States) Forte Racing powered by US RaceTronics	(Canada) Misha Goikhberg	51.184	+0.591	8
9	GTD	27	(United States) Heart of Racing Team	(Canada) Roman De Angelis	51.283	+0.690	9
10	GTD	12	(United States) Vasser Sullivan Racing	(United States) Frankie Montecalvo	51.400	+0.807	10
11	GTD	96	(United States) Turner Motorsport	(United States) Patrick Gallagher	51.419	+0.826	11
12	GTD	97	(United States) Turner Motorsport	(United States) Bill Auberlen	51.469	+0.876	12
13	GTD	92	(United States) Kelly-Moss with Riley	(United States) Alec Udell	51.476	+0.883	13
14	GTD	1	(United States) Paul Miller Racing	(United States) Madison Snow	51.643	+1.050	14
15	GTD	57	(United States) Winward Racing	(United States) Russell Ward	51.758	+1.165	15
16	GTD	80	(United States) AO Racing Team	(United States) P.J. Hyett	51.834	+1.241	16
17	GTD	94	(United States) Andretti Autosport	(United States) Jarett Andretti	52.030	+1.437	17
18	GTD	91	(United States) Kelly-Moss with Riley	(United States) Alan Metni	52.051	+1.458	18
19	GTD	77	(United States) Wright Motorsports	(United States) Alan Brynjolfsson	52.095	+1.502	19
20	GTD	66	(United States) Gradient Racing	(United States) Sheena Monk	52.632	+2.039	20

== Race ==
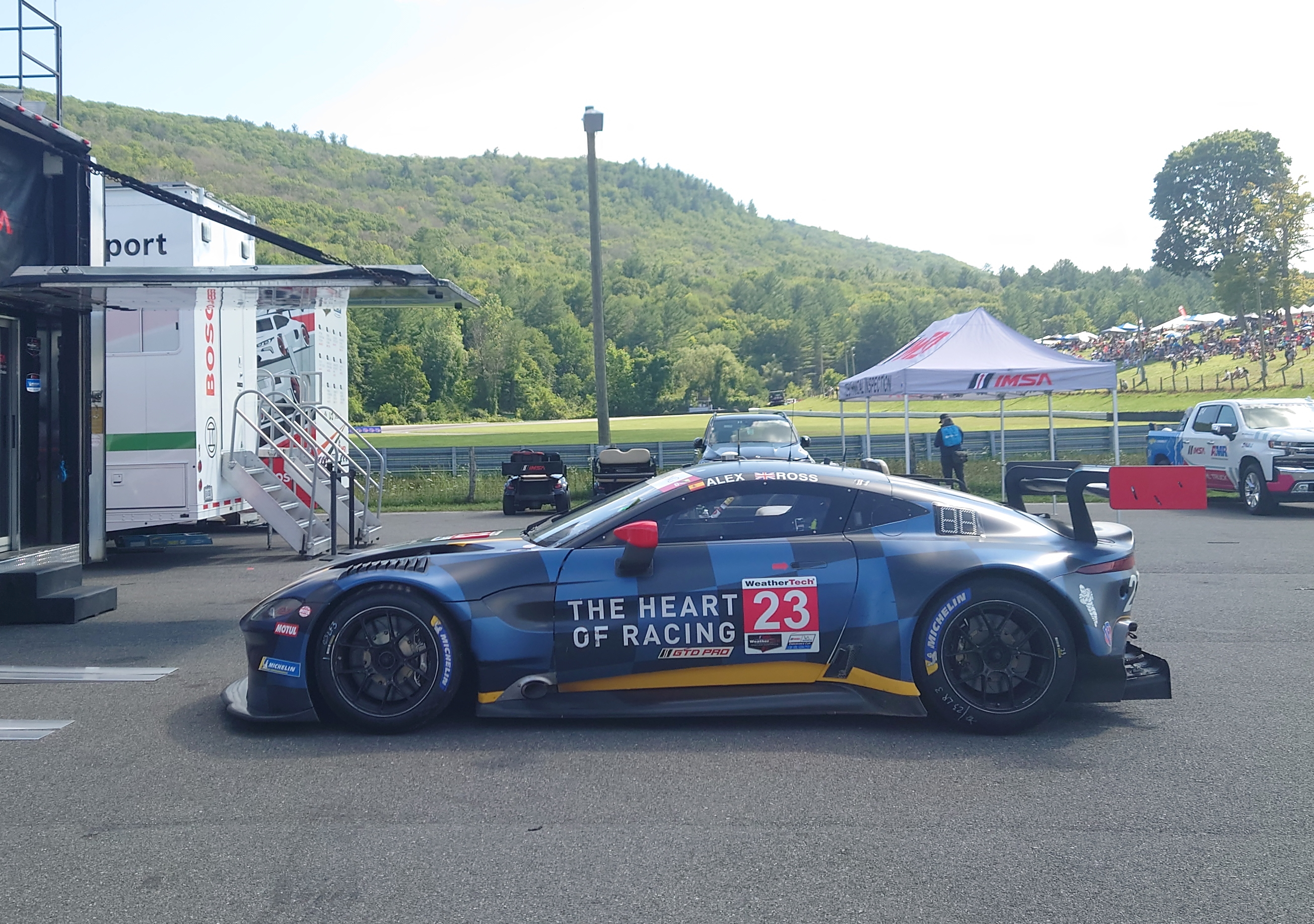
The winning Aston Martin Vantage AMR GT3

=== Post-race ===
The result kept Barnicoat and Hawksworth atop the GTD Pro Drivers' Championship with 2462 points. García and Taylor advanced from third to second. The results kept Sellers and Snow atop the GTD Drivers' Championship with 2226 points, 86 points ahead of race winners De Angelis and Sørensen. Brynjolfsson and Hindman advanced from eighth to fifth while Grenier and Skeen dropped from fifth to ninth. Lexus and BMW continued to lead their respective Manufactures' Championships while Vasser Sullivan Racing and Paul Miller Racing kept their advantages in the Teams' Championships with four rounds left in the season.

== Results ==
Class winners denoted in bold and with ‡

Pos	Class	No	Team	Drivers	Chassis	Laps	Time/Retired
Pos	Class	No	Team	Drivers	Engine	Laps	Time/Retired
1	**GTD Pro**	**23**	**(United States) Heart of Racing Team**	**(United Kingdom) Ross Gunn (Spain) Alex Riberas**	**Aston Martin Vantage AMR GT3**	**168**	**2:40.25.371‡**
1	**GTD Pro**	**23**	**(United States) Heart of Racing Team**	**(United Kingdom) Ross Gunn (Spain) Alex Riberas**	**Aston Martin 4.0 L Turbo V8**	**168**	**2:40.25.371‡**
2	GTD Pro	14	(United States) Vasser Sullivan Racing	(United Kingdom) Ben Barnicoat (United Kingdom) Jack Hawksworth	Lexus RC F GT3	168	+0.336
2	GTD Pro	14	(United States) Vasser Sullivan Racing	(United Kingdom) Ben Barnicoat (United Kingdom) Jack Hawksworth	Toyota 2UR 5.0 L V8	168	+0.336
3	GTD Pro	9	(Canada) Pfaff Motorsports	(Austria) Klaus Bachler (France) Patrick Pilet	Porsche 911 GT3 R (992)	168	+0.859
3	GTD Pro	9	(Canada) Pfaff Motorsports	(Austria) Klaus Bachler (France) Patrick Pilet	Porsche 4.2 L Flat-6	168	+0.859
4	GTD Pro	3	(United States) Corvette Racing	(Spain) Antonio García (United States) Jordan Taylor	Chevrolet Corvette C8.R GTD	168	+1.138
4	GTD Pro	3	(United States) Corvette Racing	(Spain) Antonio García (United States) Jordan Taylor	Chevrolet 5.5 L V8	168	+1.138
5	**GTD**	**27**	**(United States) Heart of Racing Team**	**(Canada) Roman De Angelis (Denmark) Marco Sørensen**	**Aston Martin Vantage AMR GT3**	**168**	**+14.443‡**
5	**GTD**	**27**	**(United States) Heart of Racing Team**	**(Canada) Roman De Angelis (Denmark) Marco Sørensen**	**Aston Martin 4.0 L Turbo V8**	**168**	**+14.443‡**
6	GTD	92	(United States) Kelly-Moss with Riley	(France) Julien Andlauer (United States) Alec Udell	Porsche 911 GT3 R (992)	168	+14.998
6	GTD	92	(United States) Kelly-Moss with Riley	(France) Julien Andlauer (United States) Alec Udell	Porsche 4.2 L Flat-6	168	+14.998
7	GTD	77	(United States) Wright Motorsports	(United States) Alan Brynjolfsson (United States) Trent Hindman	Porsche 911 GT3 R (992)	168	+15.451
7	GTD	77	(United States) Wright Motorsports	(United States) Alan Brynjolfsson (United States) Trent Hindman	Porsche 4.2 L Flat-6	168	+15.451
8	GTD	96	(United States) Turner Motorsport	(United States) Robby Foley (United States) Patrick Gallagher	BMW M4 GT3	168	+17.228
8	GTD	96	(United States) Turner Motorsport	(United States) Robby Foley (United States) Patrick Gallagher	BMW S58B30T0 3.0 L Turbo I6	168	+17.228
9	GTD	78	(United States) Forte Racing powered by US RaceTronics	(Canada) Misha Goikhberg (Italy) Loris Spinelli	Lamborghini Huracán GT3 Evo 2	168	+19.880
9	GTD	78	(United States) Forte Racing powered by US RaceTronics	(Canada) Misha Goikhberg (Italy) Loris Spinelli	Lamborghini 5.2 L V10	168	+19.880
10	GTD	66	(United States) Gradient Racing	(United Kingdom) Katherine Legge (United States) Sheena Monk	Acura NSX GT3 Evo22	168	+25.336
10	GTD	66	(United States) Gradient Racing	(United Kingdom) Katherine Legge (United States) Sheena Monk	Acura 3.5 L Turbo V6	168	+25.336
11	GTD	80	(United States) AO Racing Team	(United States) P.J. Hyett (United Kingdom) Sebastian Priaulx	Porsche 911 GT3 R (992)	168	+25.893
11	GTD	80	(United States) AO Racing Team	(United States) P.J. Hyett (United Kingdom) Sebastian Priaulx	Porsche 4.2 L Flat-6	168	+25.893
12	GTD Pro	79	(United States) WeatherTech Racing	(Andorra) Jules Gounon (Spain) Daniel Juncadella	Mercedes-AMG GT3 Evo	168	+26.841
12	GTD Pro	79	(United States) WeatherTech Racing	(Andorra) Jules Gounon (Spain) Daniel Juncadella	Mercedes-AMG M159 6.2 L V8	168	+26.841
13	GTD	1	(United States) Paul Miller Racing	(United States) Bryan Sellers (United States) Madison Snow	BMW M4 GT3	168	+30.943
13	GTD	1	(United States) Paul Miller Racing	(United States) Bryan Sellers (United States) Madison Snow	BMW S58B30T0 3.0 L Turbo I6	168	+30.943
14	GTD	57	(United States) Winward Racing	(United Kingdom) Philip Ellis (United States) Russell Ward	Mercedes-AMG GT3 Evo	168	+37.213
14	GTD	57	(United States) Winward Racing	(United Kingdom) Philip Ellis (United States) Russell Ward	Mercedes-AMG M159 6.2 L V8	168	+37.213
15	GTD	32	(United States) Team Korthoff Motorsports	(Canada) Mikaël Grenier (United States) Mike Skeen	Mercedes-AMG GT3 Evo	168	+38.011
15	GTD	32	(United States) Team Korthoff Motorsports	(Canada) Mikaël Grenier (United States) Mike Skeen	Mercedes-AMG M159 6.2 L V8	168	+38.011
16	GTD	97	(United States) Turner Motorsport	(United States) Bill Auberlen (United States) Chandler Hull	BMW M4 GT3	167	+1 lap
16	GTD	97	(United States) Turner Motorsport	(United States) Bill Auberlen (United States) Chandler Hull	BMW S58B30T0 3.0 L Turbo I6	167	+1 lap
17	GTD	12	(United States) Vasser Sullivan Racing	(United States) Frankie Montecalvo (United States) Aaron Telitz	Lexus RC F GT3	166	+2 Lqps
17	GTD	12	(United States) Vasser Sullivan Racing	(United States) Frankie Montecalvo (United States) Aaron Telitz	Toyota 2UR 5.0 L V8	166	+2 Lqps
18 DNF	GTD	70	(United Kingdom) Inception Racing	(United States) Brendan Iribe (Denmark) Frederik Schandorff	McLaren 720S GT3 Evo	102	Did Not Finish
18 DNF	GTD	70	(United Kingdom) Inception Racing	(United States) Brendan Iribe (Denmark) Frederik Schandorff	McLaren M840T 4.0 L Turbo V8	102	Did Not Finish
19 DNF	GTD	91	(United States) Kelly-Moss with Riley	(Netherlands) Kay van Berlo (United States) Alan Metni	Porsche 911 GT3 R (992)	46	Did Not Finish
19 DNF	GTD	91	(United States) Kelly-Moss with Riley	(Netherlands) Kay van Berlo (United States) Alan Metni	Porsche 4.2 L Flat-6	46	Did Not Finish
20 DNF	GTD	94	(United States) Andretti Autosport	(United States) Jarett Andretti (Colombia) Gabby Chaves	Aston Martin Vantage AMR GT3	41	Did Not Finish
20 DNF	GTD	94	(United States) Andretti Autosport	(United States) Jarett Andretti (Colombia) Gabby Chaves	Aston Martin 4.0 L Turbo V8	41	Did Not Finish

== Standings after the race ==
GTP Drivers' Championship standings
Pos.	+/–	Driver	Points
1		(Brazil) Pipo Derani (United Kingdom) Alexander Sims	1872
2		(United States) Connor De Phillippi (United Kingdom) Nick Yelloly	1862
3		(Portugal) Filipe Albuquerque (United States) Ricky Taylor	1843
4		(United Kingdom) Nick Tandy (France) Mathieu Jaminet	1809
5		(France) Sébastien Bourdais (Netherlands) Renger van der Zande	1743

LMP2 Drivers' Championship standings
Pos.	+/–	Driver	Points
1		(United Kingdom) Ben Hanley (United States) George Kurtz	973
2		(Denmark) Mikkel Jensen (United States) Steven Thomas	970
3		(France) Paul-Loup Chatin (United States) Ben Keating	967
4		(United Kingdom) Ryan Dalziel (United States) Dwight Merriman	906
5		(Netherlands) Giedo van der Garde	850

LMP3 Drivers' Championship standings
Pos.	+/–	Driver	Points
1		(Brazil) Felipe Fraga (United States) Gar Robinson	1115
2		(United Kingdom) Wayne Boyd (Canada) Anthony Mantella	934
3		(Canada) Garett Grist	928
4		(United Kingdom) Matt Bell (Canada) Orey Fidani	916
5		(Portugal) João Barbosa (United States) Lance Willsey	788

GTD Pro Drivers' Championship standings
Pos.	+/–	Driver	Points
1		(United Kingdom) Ben Barnicoat (United Kingdom) Jack Hawksworth	2462
2	1	(Spain) Antonio García (United States) Jordan Taylor	2311
3	1	(Andorra) Jules Gounon (Spain) Daniel Juncadella	2302
4		(Austria) Klaus Bachler (France) Patrick Pilet	2281
5		(United Kingdom) Ross Gunn (Spain) Alex Riberas	2083

GTD Drivers' Championship standings
Pos.	+/–	Driver	Points
1		(United States) Bryan Sellers (United States) Madison Snow	2226
2		(Canada) Roman De Angelis (Denmark) Marco Sørensen	2140
3		(United States) Aaron Telitz (United States) Frankie Montecalvo	1971
4		(United States) Brendan Iribe (Denmark) Frederik Schandorff	1920
5	3	(United States) Alan Brynjolfsson (United States) Trent Hindman	1748

- Note: Only the top five positions are included for all sets of standings.

GTP Teams' Championship standings
Pos.	+/–	Team	Points
1		(United States) #31 Whelen Engineering Racing	1872
2		(United States) #25 BMW M Team RLL	1862
3		(United States) #10 WTR with Andretti Autosport	1843
4		(Germany) #6 Porsche Penske Motorsport	1809
5		(United States) #01 Cadillac Racing	1743

LMP2 Teams' Championship standings
Pos.	+/–	Team	Points
1		(United States) #04 CrowdStrike Racing by APR	973
2		(France) #11 TDS Racing	970
3		(United States) #52 PR1/Mathiasen Motorsports	967
4		(United States) #18 Era Motorsport	906
5		(United States) #8 Tower Motorsports	889

LMP3 Teams' Championship standings
Pos.	+/–	Team	Points
1		(United States) #74 Riley Motorsports	1115
2		(Canada) #17 AWA	934
3		(United States) #30 Jr III Motorsports	928
4		(Canada) #13 AWA	916
5		(United States) #4 Ave Motorsports	808

GTD Pro Teams' Championship standings
Pos.	+/–	Team	Points
1		(United States) #14 Vasser Sullivan Racing	2462
2	1	(United States) #3 Corvette Racing	2311
3	1	(United States) #79 WeatherTech Racing	2302
4		(Canada) #9 Pfaff Motorsports	2281
5		(United States) #23 Heart of Racing Team	2083

GTD Teams' Championship standings
Pos.	+/–	Team	Points
1		(United States) #1 Paul Miller Racing	2226
2		(United States) #27 Heart of Racing Team	2140
3		(United States) #12 Vasser Sullivan Racing	1971
4		(United Kingdom) #70 Inception Racing	1920
5	3	(United States) #77 Wright Motorsports	1748

- Note: Only the top five positions are included for all sets of standings.

GTP Manufacturers' Championship standings
Pos.	+/–	Manufacturer	Points
1		(United States) Cadillac	2079
2		(Germany) BMW	2032
3		(Japan) Acura	2029
4		(Germany) Porsche	1985

GTD Pro Manufacturers' Championship standings
Pos.	+/–	Manufacturer	Points
1		(Japan) Lexus	2462
2	1	(United States) Chevrolet	2311
3	1	(Germany) Mercedes-AMG	2302
4		(Germany) Porsche	2281
5		(United Kingdom) Aston Martin	2094

GTD Manufacturers' Championship standings
Pos.	+/–	Manufacturer	Points
1		(Germany) BMW	2435
2		(United Kingdom) Aston Martin	2319
3	1	(Germany) Porsche	2194
4	1	(Japan) Lexus	2141
5	1	(United Kingdom) McLaren	2117

- Note: Only the top five positions are included for all sets of standings.

IMSA SportsCar Championship
Previous race: 2023 Chevrolet Grand Prix	2023 season	Next race: 2023 IMSA SportsCar Weekend
