= Patrick Liddy =

American racing driver (born 1997)

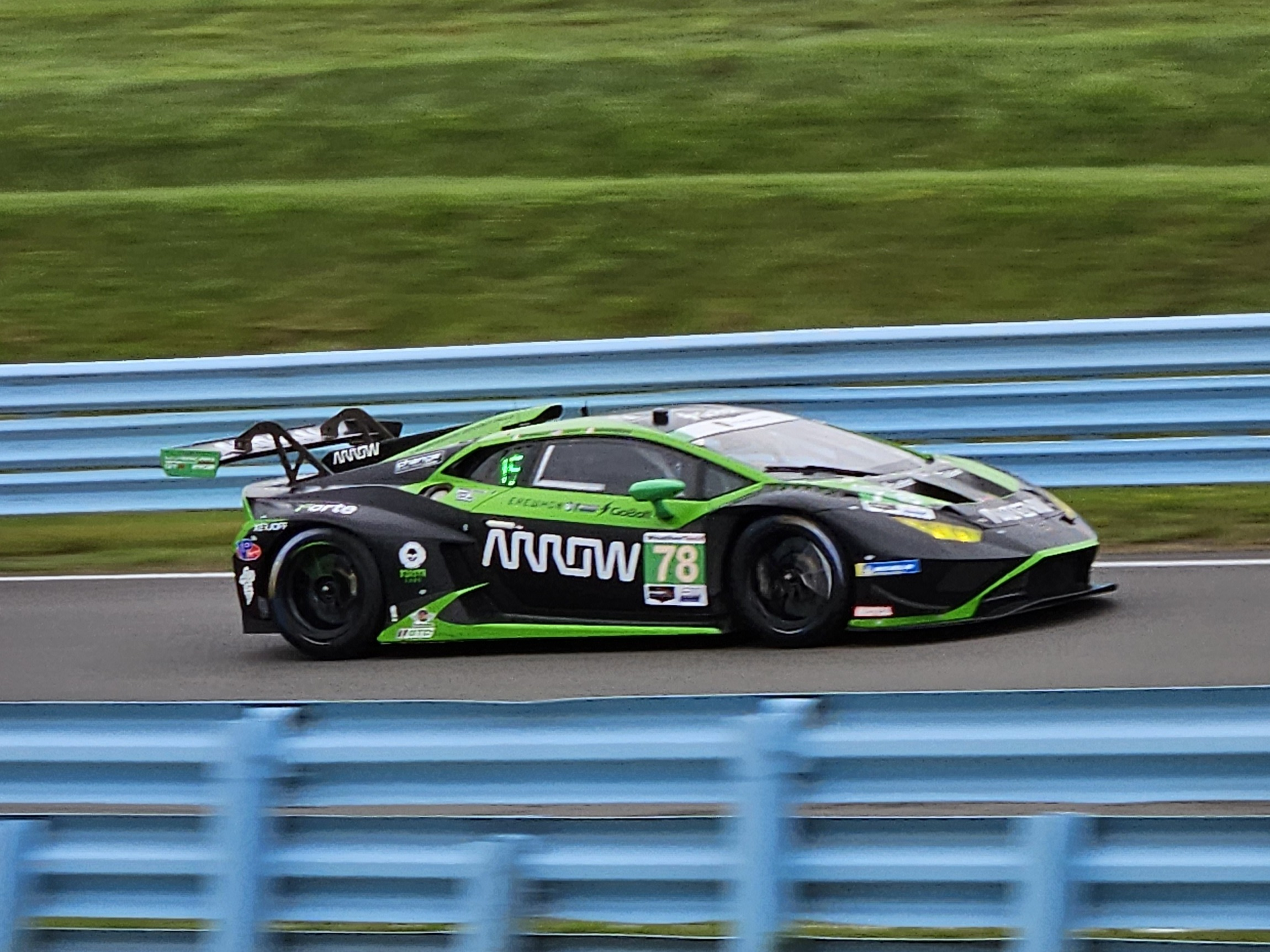
- Liddy in 2023
- Nationality: (United States) American
- Born: August 8, 1997 (age 29) Pasadena, California, U.S.

24H Series career
- Debut season: 2025
- Current team: GetSpeed Team JR286
- Categorisation: FIA Silver
- Car number: 286
- Starts: 6
- Wins: 1
- Podiums: 3
- Poles: 0
- Fastest laps: 0
- Best finish: 3rd in 2026 (GT3 Am)

Previous series
- 2018–2019, 2021–2024 2023–24 2023 2020: Lamborghini Super Trofeo North America; Asian Le Mans Series; IMSA SportsCar Championship; Lamborghini Super Trofeo Europe

Championship titles
- 2026 2022: McLaren Trophy America – Pro; Radical World Finals – Pro 1340

Patrick Liddy (born August 8, 1997) is an American racing driver who last competed for GetSpeed Team JR286 in the 24H Series.

== Career ==
Liddy began club racing in his early years, primarily competing in Spec Miata races until 2018, when he made his Lamborghini Super Trofeo North America debut for Precision Performance Motorsports. Entering only the opening two rounds of the season in the Pro-Am class, Liddy won on debut at Mid-Ohio alongside Dylan Murcott, enough for fourth in the standings. In 2019, Liddy moved to US RaceTronics to partner Bryce Miller in the Pro class, as a member of the Lamborghini Young Driver program. After a lone class podium at Barber, the pair switched to the Pro-Am class at Road America, and scored three poles and six podiums to finish third in points. Liddy also made his Michelin Pilot Challenge debut for Porsche-fielding Bodymotion Racing at Daytona.

In 2020, Liddy moved to Europe to race in Lamborghini Super Trofeo Europe for GSM Racing, finishing fifth in the Pro standings alongside Jonathan Cecotto. Moving back to North America for 2021, Liddy reunited with US RaceTronics to race on a part-time basis, in which he scored three podiums and two poles. Continuing with the team for a full season in 2022, Liddy won in class at Watkins Glen and took three poles and three other podiums to end the year fourth in the Pro-Am standings alongside Damon Ockey. Towards the end of the year, Liddy also clinched the Radical World Finals title in the Pro 1340 class.

Liddy graduated to GT3 for 2023, joining newly-renamed Forte Racing for two rounds of the IMSA SportsCar Championship. Sharing a Lamborghini Huracán GT3 Evo 2 with Misha Goikhberg and Loris Spinelli, Liddy won Petit Le Mans in the GTD class. That year, Liddy also made a brief return to Lamborghini Super Trofeo North America with the team, taking a Pro-Am win at Vallelunga alonside Blake McDonald. In early 2024, Liddy made his LMP2 debut, competing in the UAE leg of the Asian Le Mans Series for Nielsen Racing, taking a best finish of eighth with McDonald and Matt Bell. For the rest of the year, Liddy returned to Forte for another season in LSTNA. Dabbling between the Pro and Pro-Am classes, Liddy found more success in the latter, with five class podiums and sixth place in points. Liddy also drove for Corvette-fielding DXDT Racing at the Indianapolis 8 Hours alongside McDonald and Bryan Sellers.

In 2025, Liddy competed for Dragon Racing at the Dubai 24 Hour, for GetSpeed Performance at the 24 Hours of Barcelona, and for Forte Racing in McLaren Trophy America, where he took three wins from three starts. In 2026, Liddy joined GetSpeed to race a Mercedes-AMG GT3 Evo on a full-time basis in the 24H Series, as well as continuing with Forte in McLaren Trophy America. In the former, Liddy won the 12 Hours of Nürburgring in class and took two other podiums to end the year third in class. In the latter, Liddy took an outright win at Road Atlanta, as well as two other Pro class wins, to clinch the title with Tanner Harvey six hours after the finale due to a miscalculation in points by the timing and scoring system. During 2026, Liddy also drove for Forte Racing's LMP3 division in the IMSA VP Racing SportsCar Challenge on a part-time basis.

== Racing record ==
=== Racing career summary ===
Season	Series	Team	Races	Wins	Poles	F/Laps	Podiums	Points	Position
2018	Lamborghini Super Trofeo North America – Pro-Am	Precision Performance Motorsports	4	1	0	0	4	51	4th
2019	Michelin Pilot Challenge – GS	Bodymotion Racing	1	0	0	0	0	10	76th
2019	Lamborghini Super Trofeo North America – Pro	US RaceTronics	5	0	0	0	1	40	6th
2019	Lamborghini Super Trofeo North America – Pro-Am	US RaceTronics	7	0	3	0	6	81	**3rd**
2019	Lamborghini Super Trofeo World Finals – Pro-Am	US RaceTronics	2	0	0	0	0	7	8th
2020	Lamborghini Super Trofeo Europe – Pro	GSM Racing						59	5th
2020	Italian Sport Prototype Championship		2	0	0	0	0	3	20th
2021	Lamborghini Super Trofeo North America – Pro-Am	US RaceTronics	6	0	2	0	3	50	5th
2022	Lamborghini Super Trofeo North America – Pro-Am	US RaceTronics	12	1	3	0	4	101	4th
2022	Radical World Finals – Pro 1340		4	2	0	1	3		**1st**
2023	IMSA SportsCar Championship – GTD	Forte Racing powered by US RaceTronics	2	1	0	0	1	645	37th
2023	Lamborghini Super Trofeo North America – Pro-Am	Forte Racing powered by US RaceTronics	2	1	1	1	1	24	15th
2023–24	Asian Le Mans Series – LMP2	Nielsen Racing	3	0	0	0	0	6	16th
2024	Lamborghini Super Trofeo North America – Pro-Am	Forte Racing	6	0	0	0	5	62	6th
2024	Lamborghini Super Trofeo North America – Pro	Forte Racing	4	0	1	0	1	27	8th
2024	GT World Challenge America – Pro-Am	DXDT Racing	1	0	0	0	0	0	NC†
2025	Middle East Trophy – GT3 Pro-Am	Dragon Racing	1	0	0	0	0	0	NC
2025	24H Series – GT3 Am	GetSpeed Performance	1	0	0	0	0	34	NC
2025	McLaren Trophy America – Pro-Am	Forte Racing	3	3	0	1	3	0	NC†
2025–26	24H Series Middle East – GT3	Optimum Motorsport	1	0	0	0	0	0	NC
2026	24H Series – GT3 Am	GetSpeed Team JR286	5	1	0	0	3	148	**3rd**
2026	McLaren Trophy America – Pro	Forte Racing	10	3	1	0	8	88	**1st**
2026	IMSA VP Racing SportsCar Challenge – LMP3	Forte Racing	2	0	0	0	0	510	25th
2027	Kyalami 24 Hours – GT3 Am	GetSpeed Performance						—N/a	

^{†} As Liddy was a guest driver, he was ineligible to score points.

=== Complete IMSA SportsCar Championship results ===
(key) (Races in bold indicate pole position; results in italics indicate fastest lap)

Year	Team	Class	Make	Engine	1	2	3	4	5	6	7	8	9	10	11	Pos.	Points
2023	Forte Racing powered by US RaceTronics	GTD	Lamborghini Huracán GT3 Evo 2	Lamborghini DGF 5.2 L V10	DAY	SEB	LBH	LGA	**WGL**; 7	MOS	LIM	ELK	VIR	IMS	ATL; 1	37th	645

=== Complete Asian Le Mans Series results ===
(key) (Races in bold indicate pole position) (Races in italics indicate fastest lap)

Year	Team	Class	Car	Engine	1	2	3	4	5	Pos.	Points
2023–24	Nielsen Racing	LMP2	Oreca 07	Gibson GK428 4.2 L V8	SEP; 1	SEP; 2	DUB; 1 Ret	ABU; 1; 8	ABU; 2; 9	16th	6

=== Complete IMSA VP Racing SportsCar Challenge results ===
(key) (Races in bold indicate pole position; results in italics indicate fastest lap)

Year	Entrant	Class	Chassis	1	2	3	4	5	6	7	8	9	10	11	12	13	14	Rank	Points
2026	Forte Racing	LMP3	Ligier JS P325	DAY; 1	DAY; 2	AUS1; 1	AUS1; 2	SEB	AUS2	MOH; 1	MOH; 2	VIR; 8	MOS; 1	MOS; 2	ELK; 4	ATL; 1	ATL; 2	25th	510
