= Andrew Davis (racing driver) =

American racing driver (born 1977)

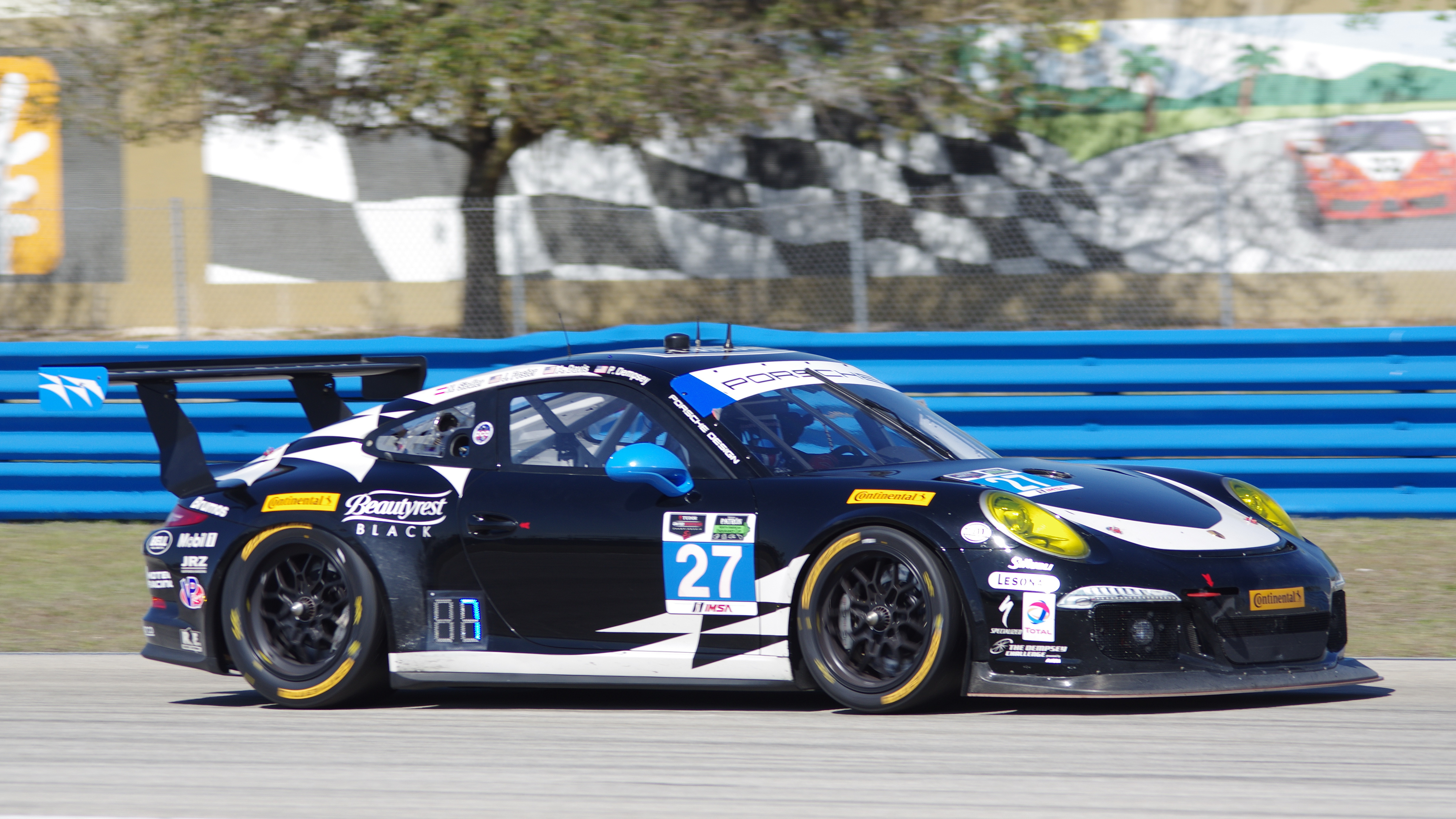
- Davis in 2014
- Nationality: (United States) American
- Born: 2 November 1977 (age 49) Lilburn, Georgia, U.S.
- Categorisation: FIA Platinum (until 2012); FIA Gold (2013–2014); FIA Silver (2015–)

Championship titles
- 2026 2015 2011: Porsche Endurance Challenge North America – Cayman Pro-Am; Continental Tire Sports Car Challenge – GS; Rolex Sports Car Series – GT

Andrew Davis (born 2 November 1977) is an American racing driver who last competed in GT World Challenge America for Rebel Rock Racing.

== Career ==
Davis made his car racing debut in 1998, racing in the Sports 2000 class of the SCCA National Championship Runoffs. Two years in the USF2000 Championship then ensued, before making his sportscar racing debut in 2001 with Archangel Motorsports at the 24 Hours of Daytona and Petit Le Mans, finishing second in LMP675 in the latter. Across the following three seasons, Davis made one-off appearances in the American Le Mans Series and Rolex Sports Car Series, before joining Tafel Racing for his first full-time season in the GT class of the Rolex Sports Car Series in 2005.

Spending two and a half seasons with Porsche-fielding Tafel, Davis scored a best result of second in Utah in 2006 en route to sixth in points, before leaving the team with five rounds yet to be run the following year to join Synergy Racing for select starts. In 2008, Davis joined Robin Liddell at Pontiac-fielding Stevenson Motorsports to continue in the series, and took wins in Mexico, VIR and Montreal to secure runner-up honors in GT. Continuing with the team for 2009, Davis began the season with a win at VIR, before ending the year with wins at Barber and Montreal en route to a third-place points finish. A third season with Stevenson then followed, in which Davis scored a lone win in Utah and three podiums to finish fourth in the GT standings, driving a Chevrolet Camaro GT.R.

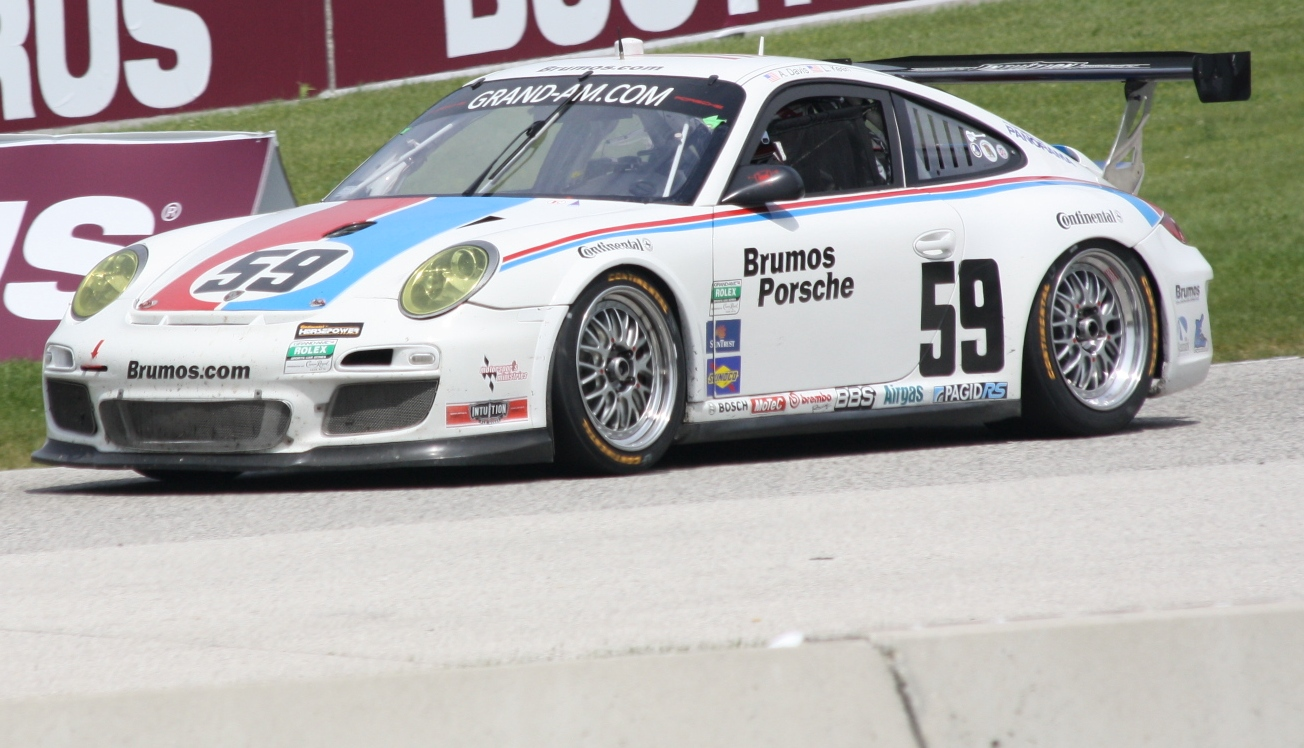
Davis' Brumos Racing Porsche at Road America in 2011, the year he was crowned Grand-Am champion.

Switching to Porsche customer team Brumos Racing for 2011, Davis scored wins at Watkins Glen and Laguna Seca and finished third at Lime Rock to secure the GT class title alongside Leh Keen. Continuing with Brumos for 2012, Davis scored a best result of third four times and a pole at the 24 Hours of Daytona to end the year fifth in points. A third season with the team then ensued, in which Davis scored a best result of third at Circuit of the Americas among his selected starts en route to a 17th-place points finish.

When the American Le Mans Series and the Rolex Sports Car Series merged to become the United SportsCar Championship in 2014, Davis joined Porsche-linked Dempsey Racing to compete in the GTD class of the newly-created series. In his maiden full-time season in the series, Davis scored a best result of third at VIR to end the year 19th in points. In parallel, Davis raced for Stevenson Motorsports in the Continental Tire Sports Car Challenge, reuniting with Robin Liddell and scoring wins at Sebring, Watkins Glen and Indianapolis en route to third in the GS standings, aboard a Chevrolet Camaro GT4. Continuing with Stevenson Motorsports for his sophomore season in the Continental Tire Sports Car Challenge, Davis scored four wins and four other podiums to secure the GS class title. During 2015, Davis also joined Porsche-affiliated Alex Job Racing to compete in the endurance rounds of the United SportsCar Championship, scoring a best result of second at the 24 Hours of Daytona.

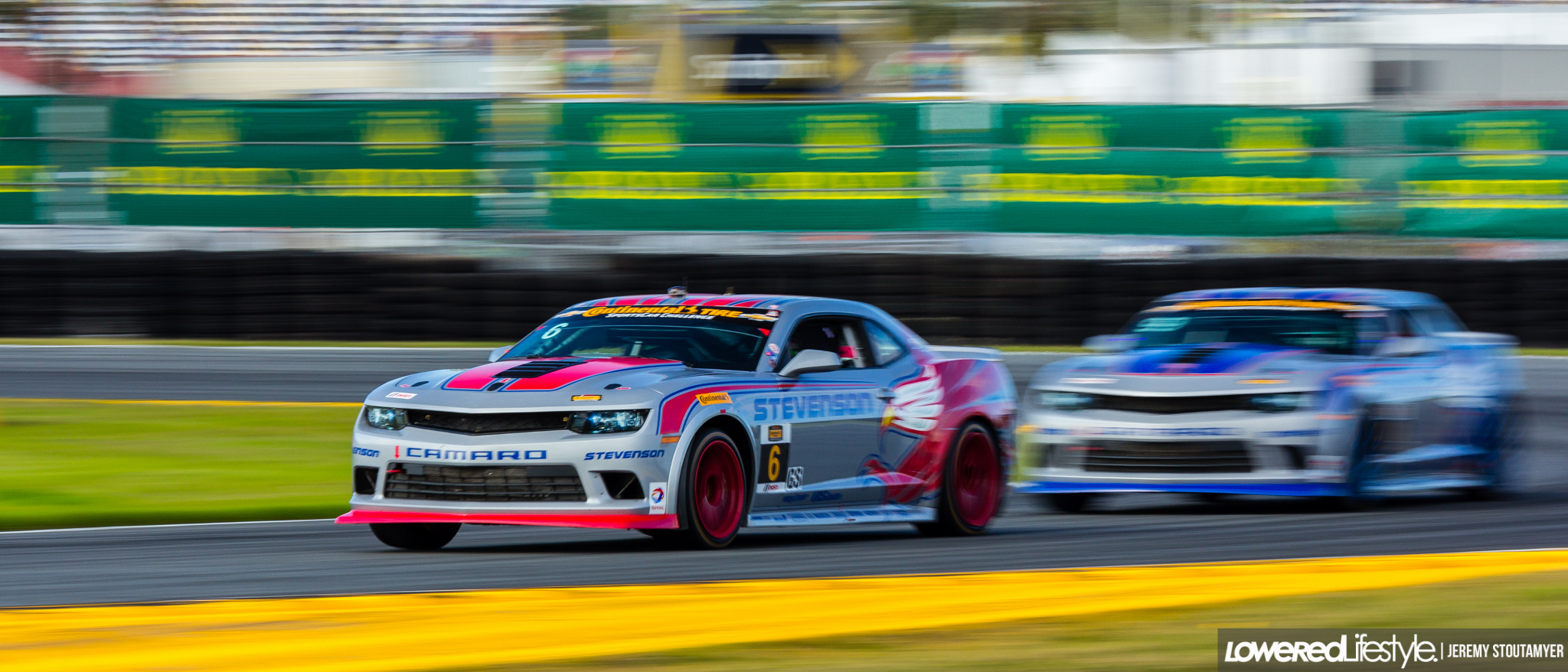
Davis on his way to the 2015 CTSCC title, driving Stevenson's Chevrolet Camaro at Daytona.

Remaining with Stevenson Motorsports in 2016, as the team joined the newly-rebranded IMSA SportsCar Championship with an Audi R8 LMS in GTD, Davis and Liddell scored a pair of second-place finishes at Mosport and Lime Rock to end the season fourth in points. Staying with the team for 2017, Davis scored his only series win at Mosport and finished third at Road America en route to seventh in the GTD standings. Across the following two seasons, Davis primarily raced in the Endurance Cup of the IMSA SportsCar Championship for fellow Audi-fielding teams Magnus Racing and Moorespeed in 2018 and 2019, respectively. During this time period, Davis also made select appearances in the Continental Tire SportsCar Challenge, in which he most notably finished third at VIR for Rebel Rock Racing in 2018, driving a Chevrolet Camaro GT4.

Davis then joined GMG Racing to compete in the GT4 America Series, in which he scored an outright win at Circuit of the Americas and three other class podiums to take fourth in the Pro-Am standings. During 2020, Davis also made select appearances in the IMSA SportsCar Championship for Team Hardpoint, and in the Michelin Pilot Challenge for Rebel Rock Racing, in which he won at Road Atlanta. The following year, Davis joined Audi-fielding McCann Racing to return to full-time competition in the Michelin Pilot Challenge, taking a best result of fourth at Road Atlanta and ending the year seventh in the GS standings. During 2021, Davis also raced full-time in GT4 America for Aston Martin-fielding GMG Racing, as well as making select appearances in the IMSA SportsCar Championship for Audi customer team NTE Sport and Aston Martin-linked Team Hardpoint EBM.

Continuing with McCann Racing for 2022, as they switched to a Porsche Cayman, Davis scored a lone podium at Mid-Ohio en route to 13th in points. During 2022, Davis also returned to GMG Racing for his third consecutive full-time season in GT4 America. Returning full-time to the latter, albeit moving to Porsche-linked ACI Motorsports, Davis secured a best result of third at Indianapolis and two other class podiums to finish sixth in the Silver Cup standings. During 2023, Davis also raced at the 24 Hours of Daytona for Kelly-Moss with Riley in a Porsche 911 GT3 R (992), as well as racing in the endurance rounds of the Michelin Pilot Challenge for Camaro-fielding Rebel Rock Racing.

A part-time season in Michelin Pilot Challenge split between Rebel Rock and Ruckus Racing the following year then followed, before Davis returned to full-time competition in McLaren Trophy America in 2025 for RWE Motorsport. Racing in the Pro-Am class in his only season in the series, Davis scored an outright win at VIR, two further class wins and four other podiums to clinch runner-up honors in class. During 2025, Davis also returned to Rebel Rock Racing, which now fielded an Aston Martin Vantage GT4, for the endurance rounds of the Michelin Pilot Challenge. Davis continued with Rebel Rock Racing for a similar program the following year, in which he and Robin Liddell opened up the season by winning at Daytona, before returning at the end of the year to compete in the Indianapolis 8 Hour with the team. During 2026, Davis also clinched the Cayman Pro-Am title in Porsche Endurance Challenge North America alongside William Peluchiwski.

== Racing record ==
=== Racing career summary ===
Season	Series	Team	Races	Wins	Poles	F/Laps	Podiums	Points	Position
1998	SCCA National Championship Runoffs – Sports 2000		1	0	0	0	0	—N/a	11th
1999	USF2000 National Championship		3	0	0	0	0	23	25th
1999	SCCA National Championship Runoffs – Formula Continental		1	0	0	0	0	—N/a	19th
2000	USF2000 National Championship		10	0	0	0	0	91	13th
2001	Grand American Road Racing Championship – SRPII	Archangel Motorsport Services	1	0	0	0	0	30	34th
2001	American Le Mans Series – LMP675	Archangel Motorsports	1	0	0	0	0	26	9th
2002	American Le Mans Series – LMP675	Archangel Motorsports	1	0	0	0	0	19	39th
2003	Rolex Sports Car Series – GT	The Racer's Group	1	0	0	0	0	39	21st
2003	Rolex Sports Car Series – GT	Foxhill Racing	1	0	0	0	0	39	21st
2003	Grand-Am Cup – GS	Foxhill Racing	6	0	0	0	0		
2003	American Le Mans Series – GT	ACEMCO Motorsports	2	0	0	0	0	8	49th
2003	American Le Mans Series – LMP675	Essex Racing	1	0	0	0	0	16	20th
2004	Rolex Sports Car Series – SGS	Foxhill Racing	1	0	0	0	0	26	41st
2004	Rolex Sports Car Series – Prototype	Silverstone Racing Services	2	0	0	0	0	60	34th
2004	Rolex Sports Car Series – Prototype	The Spark of Georgia Tech	1	0	0	0	0	60	34th
2004	American Le Mans Series – GT	Foxhill Racing/Comprent Motor Sports	1	0	0	0	0	0	NC
2005	Rolex Sports Car Series – GT	Tafel Racing	13	0	0	0	0	307	9th
2005	Grand-Am Cup – GS	Race Prep Motorsports	1	0	0	0	0	0	119th
2005	American Le Mans Series – GT2	TRG	0	0	0	0	0	0	NC
2006	Rolex Sports Car Series – GT	Tafel Racing	13	0	0	0	1	351	6th
2006	Grand-Am Cup – GS	Tafel Racing	1	0	0	0	0	3	98th
2006	Grand-Am Cup – GS	Race Prep Motorsports	1	0	0	0	0	3	98th
2006	American Le Mans Series – LMP2	Miracle Motorsports	0	0	0	0	0	0	NC
2007	KONI Sports Car Challenge – GS	TRG	1	0	0	0	0	11	91st
2007	KONI Sports Car Challenge – ST	V-Pack Motorsport	1	0	0	0	0	81st	21
2007	KONI Sports Car Challenge – ST	Kinetic Motorsports	1	0	0	0	0	81st	21
2007	Rolex Sports Car Series – GT	Tafel Racing	7	0	0	0	0	185	20th
2007	Rolex Sports Car Series – GT	Synergy Racing	3	0	0	0	0	185	20th
2008	KONI Sports Car Challenge – GS	Motorsports Technology Group	9	0	0	0	0	143	20th
2008	Rolex Sports Car Series – GT	Stevenson Motorsports	13	3	0	0	9	364	**2nd**
2009	KONI Sports Car Challenge – GS	Maxwell Paper Racing	2	0	0	0	0	3	79th
2009	Rolex Sports Car Series – GT	Stevenson Motorsports	12	3	0	0	5	317	**3rd**
2010	Rolex Sports Car Series – GT	Stevenson Motorsports	12	1	0	0	4	315	4th
2010	American Le Mans Series – GTC	Magnus Racing	1	0	0	0	0	0	NC
2011	Rolex Sports Car Series – GT	Brumos Racing	12	1	0	0	2	319	**1st**
2011	American Le Mans Series – GTC	Kelly-Moss Motorsports	3	0	0	0	0	32	16th
2012	Rolex Sports Car Series – GT	Brumos Racing	13	0	0	0	4	329	5th
2012	American Le Mans Series – GTC	Competition Motorsports	1	0	0	0	0	0	NC
2013	Rolex Sports Car Series – GT	Brumos Racing	7	0	0	0	1	143	17th
2013	American Le Mans Series – GTC	Dempsey Racing/Del Piero	2	0	0	0	0	16	16th
2014	Continental Tire Sports Car Challenge – GS	Stevenson Motorsports	12	3	1	1	5	312	**3rd**
2014	United SportsCar Championship – GTD	Dempsey Racing	11	0	0	0	1	178	19th
2015	Continental Tire Sports Car Challenge – GS	Stevenson Motorsports	10	4	0	0	8	318	**1st**
2015	United SportsCar Championship – GTD	Alex Job Racing	4	0	0	0	1	109	16th
2016	IMSA SportsCar Championship – GTD	Stevenson Motorsports	11	0	0	0	3	290	4th
2016	Pirelli World Challenge – GT	Calvert Dynamics	13	0	0	0	0	755	16th
2017	IMSA SportsCar Championship – GTD	Stevenson Motorsports	12	1	0	0	2	283	7th
2017	Pirelli World Challenge – GT	McCann Racing	2	0	1	0	1	51	35th
2017	Pirelli World Challenge – GT	Magnus Racing	2	0	0	0	0	51	35th
2017	SprintX GT Championship Series – GT	McCann Racing	2	0	1	0	1	51	21st
2017	SprintX GT Championship Series – GT	Magnus Racing	2	0	0	0	0	51	21st
2017	Intercontinental GT Challenge	Calvert Dynamics / GMG Racing	1	0	0	0	0	4	14th
2018	Continental Tire SportsCar Challenge – GS	GMG Racing	1	0	0	0	0	65	35th
2018	Continental Tire SportsCar Challenge – GS	Rebel Rock Racing	3	0	0	0	1	65	35th
2018	IMSA SportsCar Championship – GTD	Magnus Racing	4	0	0	0	0	79	28th
2018	24H GT Series Continents – GT4	Classic BMW	1	1	0	0	1	44	NC
2019	Michelin Pilot Challenge – GS	Rebel Rock Racing	2	0	0	0	0	53	43rd
2019	IMSA SportsCar Championship – GTD	Moorespeed	2	0	0	0	0	34	44th
2019	GT4 America Series – East Pro-Am	Kelly-Moss Road & Race	4	0	0	0	0	34	9th
2019	GT4 America Series – SprintX Pro-Am	GMG Racing	2	0	0	0	0	12	12th
2019	24H GT Series Continents – 991	Kelly-Moss Road and Race	1	0	0	0	0	0	NC
2020	Michelin Pilot Challenge – GS	Rebel Rock Racing	2	1	0	0	1	53	36th
2020	GT4 America Series – Pro-Am	GMG Racing	15	1	2	1	4	172	4th
2020	IMSA SportsCar Championship – GTD	Team Hardpoint	2	0	0	0	0	46	34th
2021	Michelin Pilot Challenge – GS	McCann Racing	10	0	0	0	0	2210	7th
2021	IMSA SportsCar Championship – GTD	NTE Sport	1	0	0	0	0	656	34th
2021	IMSA SportsCar Championship – GTD	Team Hardpoint EBM	2	0	0	0	0	656	34th
2021	GT4 America Series – Pro-Am	GMG Racing	14	0	0	0	0	71	11th
2021	Indianapolis 8 Hours – GT4 Pro-Am	GMG Racing	1	0	0	0	0	—N/a	DNF
2022	Michelin Pilot Challenge – GS	McCann Racing	10	0	1	0	1	1740	13th
2022	GT4 America Series – Pro-Am	GMG Racing	11	0	0	0	0	40	14th
2023	Michelin Pilot Challenge – GS	Rebel Rock Racing	2	0	0	0	0	290	42nd
2023	IMSA SportsCar Championship – GTD	Kelly-Moss with Riley	1	0	0	0	0	114	70th
2023	GT4 America Series – Silver	ACI Motorsports	14	0	0	0	3	145	6th
2024	Michelin Pilot Challenge – GS	Rebel Rock Racing	2	0	0	0	0	610	34th
2024	Michelin Pilot Challenge – GS	Ruckus Racing	1	0	0	0	0	610	34th
2025	Michelin Pilot Challenge – GS	Rebel Rock Racing	2	0	0	0	0	320	50th
2025	McLaren Trophy America – Pro-Am	RWE Motorsport	10	3	0	0	7	106	**2nd**
2026	Michelin Pilot Challenge – GS	Rebel Rock Racing	1	1	0	0	1	350	46th
2026	Porsche Endurance Challenge North America – Cayman Pro-Am		4	4	4	4	4	302	**1st**
2026	GT World Challenge America – Pro-Am	Rebel Rock Racing	1	0	0	0	0	0	NC†

=== Complete Grand-Am Rolex Sports Car Series results ===
(key) (Races in bold indicate pole position; results in italics indicate fastest lap)

Year	Team	Class	Make	Engine	1	2	3	4	5	6	7	8	9	10	11	12	13	14	Rank	Points	Ref
2001	Archangel Motorsport Services	SRPII	Lola B2K/40	Nissan 3.0 L V6	DAY; 5	MIA	PHX	WGL	LIM	MOH	ELK	TRO	WGL	DAY					34th	30	
2003	The Racer's Group	GT	Porsche 996 GT3-RS	Porsche 3.6 L Flat-6	DAY; 16	MIA	PHX; 20	BAR	CAL	WGL	MOH								21st	39	
2003	Foxhill Racing	GT	Porsche 996 GT3 Cup	Porsche 3.6 L Flat-6								DAY; 7	WGL	MTT	VIR	DAY			21st	39	
2004	Foxhill Racing	SGS	Porsche 996 GT3 Cup	Porsche 3.6 L Flat-6	DAY; 5	MIA; DNA	PHX; DNA		WGL; DNA	DAY; DNA	MOH	WGL; DNA	MIA			CAL; DNA			41st	26	
2004	Silverstone Racing Services	P	Crawford DP03	Chevrolet LS6 5.5 L V8				MTT; 9	WGL; 14										34th	60	
2004	The Spark of Georgia Tech	P	Crawford DP03	Chevrolet LS6 5.5 L V8										VIR; WD	BAR; 10				34th	60	
2005	Tafel Racing	GT	Porsche 997 GT3 Cup	Porsche 3.6L F6	DAY; 4	MIA; 11	CAL; 8	LAG; 7	MTT; 8	WGL; 4	DAY; 5	BAR; 8	WGL; 11	MOH; 5	PHX; 8	WGL; 9	VIR; 10	MEX	9th	307	
2006	Tafel Racing	GT	Porsche 997 GT3 Cup	Porsche 3.6L F6	DAY; 12	MEX; 5	MIA; 13	VIR; 12	LAG; 16	PHX; 10	LIM; 13	WGL; 8	MOH; 18	DAY; 4	BAR; 6	SON; 11	MIL; 2		6th	351	
2007	Tafel Racing	GT	Porsche 997 GT3 Cup	Porsche 3.6L F6	DAY; 18	MEX; 5	MIA; 19	VIR; 4	LAG; 17	LIM; 22	WGL; WD	MOH; 8							20th	185	
2007	Synergy Racing	GT	Porsche 997 GT3 Cup	Porsche 3.6L F6									DAY; 19	IOW	BAR	CGV; 7	MIL; 7		20th	185	
2008	Stevenson Motorsports	GT	Pontiac GXP.R	Pontiac 6.0L V8	DAY; 9	MIA; 24	MEX; 1	VIR; 1	LAG; 17	LIM; 3	WGL; 2	MOH; 2	DAY; 3	BAR; 4	CGV; 1	NJMP; 2	MIL; 2		2nd	364	
2009	Stevenson Motorsports	GT	Pontiac GXP.R	Pontiac 6.0L V8	DAY; 6	VIR; 1	NJMP; 5	LAG; 6	WGL; 8	MOH; 2	DAY; 16†	BAR; 1	WGL; 4	CGV; 1	MIL; 7	MIA; 2			3rd	317	
2010	Stevenson Motorsports	GT	Chevrolet Camaro GT.R	GM LS3 6.0L V8	DAY; 4	MIA; 2	BAR; 4	VIR; 7	LIM; 12	WGL; 9	MOH; 5	DAY; 3	NJMP; 7	WGL; 14	CGV; 3	MIL; 1			4th	315	
2011	Brumos Racing	GT	Porsche 911 GT3 Cup	Porsche 3.6L F6	DAY; 5	MIA; 7	BAR; 10	VIR; 5	LIM; 3	WGL; 1	ELK; 6	LAG; 1	NJMP; 12	WGL; 7	CGV; 5	MOH; 4			1st	319	
2012	Brumos Racing	GT	Porsche 911 GT3 Cup	Porsche 3.8L F6	**DAY**; 3	BAR; 3	MIA; 6	NJMP; 9	BEL; 13	MOH; 7	ELK; 5	WGL; 6	IMS; 3	WGL; 3	CGV; 4	LAG; 6	LIM; 15		5th	329	
2013	Brumos Racing	GT	Porsche 911 GT3 Cup	Porsche 4.0L F6	DAY; 13	COA; 3	BAR; 10	ATL; 4	BEL	MOH; 9	WGL; 16†	IMS; 7	ELK	KNS	LAG	LIM			17th	143	

=== Complete American Le Mans Series results ===
(key) (Races in bold indicate pole position)

Year	Team	Class	Make	Engine	1	2	3	4	5	6	7	8	9	10	Rank	Points	Ref
2001	Archangel Motorsports	LMP675	Lola B2K/40	Nissan (AER) VQL 3.0L V6	TEX	SEB	DON	JAR	SON	POR	MOS	MOH	MON	PET; 2	9th	26	
2002	Archangel Motorsports	LMP675	Reynard 01Q	Ford (Nicholson-McLaren) 3.3 L V8	SEB	SON	MOH	ELK	WAS	TRO	MOS	LGA	MIA	PET; 6	39th	19	
2003	ACEMCO Motorsports	GT	Ferrari 360 Modena GTC	Ferrari 3.6L V8	SEB; 17	ATL; 5	SON	TRO	MOS	ELK	LGA	MIA			49th	8	
2003	Essex Racing	LMP675	Lola B2K/40	Nissan (AER) VQL 3.0 L V6									PET; 4		20th	16	
2004	Foxhill Racing/Comprent Motor Sports	GT	Porsche 911 GT3-RS	Porsche 3.6 L Flat-6	SEB	MOH	LIM	SON	POR	MOS	ELK	PET; Ret	LGA		NC	0	
2005	TRG	GT2	Porsche 911 GT3-RSR	Porsche 3.6 L Flat-6	SEB; WD	ATL	MOH	LIM	SON	POR	ELK	MOS	PET	LGA	NC	0	
2006	Miracle Motorsports	LMP2	Courage C65	AER P07 2.0L Turbo I4	SEB; WD	REL	MOH	LIM	MIL	POR	RDA	MOS	PET	LGA	NC	0	
2010	Magnus Racing	GTC	Porsche 997 GT3 Cup	Porsche 3.8 L Flat-6	SEB	LBH	LAG	UTA	LIM	MDO	ELK	MOS	PET; 3		NC	0	
2011	Kelly-Moss Motorsports	GTC	Porsche 997 GT3 Cup	Porsche 3.8 L Flat-6	SEB; 6	LBH	LIM; WD	MOS	MDO; 6	ELK	BAL; 4	LAG	PET		16th	32	
2012	Competition Motorsports	GTC	Porsche 997 GT3 Cup	Porsche 4.0 L Flat-6	SEB	LBH	LAG	LIM	MOS	MDO	ELK	BAL	VIR	PET; Ret	NC	0	
2013	Dempsey Racing/Del Piero	GTC	Porsche 997 GT3 Cup	Porsche 4.0 L Flat-6	SEB; 7	LBH	LGA; 6	LIM	MOS	ELK	BAL	COT	VIR	PET	16th	16	

=== Complete Michelin Pilot Challenge results ===
(key) (Races in bold indicate pole position) (Races in italics indicate fastest lap)

Year	Entrant	Class	Make	1	2	3	4	5	6	7	8	9	10	11	12	Rank	Points
2003	Foxhill Racing	GS I	Porsche 996 GT3 Cup	DAY; 10	HMS; 10	PHX	BAR; 7	CAL	WGL; 5	MOH	MOS	MTT; 6	VIR; 5	DAY		?	?
2005	Race Prep Motorsports	Grand Sport	Porsche 996	DAY	CAL; 44	LGA	WGL	MOS	BAR	TRO	MOH	PHX	VIR			119th	0
2006	Tafel Racing	Grand Sport	Porsche 996	DAY	VIR	LGA	PHX	LIM	MOH	BAR; 31	TRO	UTA				98th	3
2006	Race Prep Motorsports	Grand Sport	Porsche 996										VIR; 28			98th	3
2007	TRG	Grand Sport	Porsche 997	DAY	HMS	IOW	LGA	LIM	MOS	MOH	WGL	BAR; 10				91st	11
2007	V-Pack Motorsport	Street Tuner	BMW 330i									BAR; 20	TRO	UTA		81st	21
2007	Kinetic Motorsports	Street Tuner	BMW 330i												VIR; 31	81st	21
2008	Motorsports Technology Group	Grand Sport	Porsche 997	DAY; 29	LIM; 8	MOS; 9	MOH	WGL; 17		IOW; 11	TRO	NJMP; 19	UTA; 12			20th	143
2008	Motorsports Technology Group	Grand Sport	BMW Z4						BAR; 6					VIR; 24		20th	143
2009	Maxwell Paper Racing	Grand Sport	Mazda RX-8	DAY; 22												79th	3
2009	Maxwell Paper Racing	Grand Sport	Porsche 997		HMS; 23	NJMP	LGA	LIM	WGL	MOH	BAR	TRO	UTA	VIR		79th	3
2014	Stevenson Motorsports	Grand Sport	Chevrolet Camaro GT4.R	DAY; 24	SEB; 1	LGA; 18	LIM; 8	KAN; 6	WGL; 1	MOS; 5	IMS; 1	ELK; 2	VIR; 2	COA; 4	ATL; 10	3rd	312
2015	Stevenson Motorsports	Grand Sport	Chevrolet Camaro GT4.R	DAY; 2	SEB; 1	LGA; 1	WGL; 1	MOS; 3	LIM; 4	ELK; 5	VIR; 3	COA; 1	ATL; 2			1st	318
2018	GMG Racing	Grand Sport	Audi R8 LMS GT4	DAY; 25	SEB	MOH	WGL	MOS	LIM	ELK						35th	65
2018	Rebel Rock Racing	Grand Sport	Chevrolet Camaro GT4.R								VIR; 3	LGA; 12	ATL; 22			35th	65
2019	Rebel Rock Racing	Grand Sport	Chevrolet Camaro GT4.R	DAY; 35	SEB	MOH	WGL; 5	MOS	LIM; 5	ELK	VIR	LGA	ATL			43rd	53
2020	Rebel Rock Racing	Grand Sport	Chevrolet Camaro GT4.R	DAY; 13	SEB	ELK	VIR	ATL; 1	MOH; 1	MOH; 2	ATL	LAG	SEB			36th	53
2021	McCann Racing	Grand Sport	Audi R8 LMS GT4 Evo	DAY; 11	SEB; 12	MOH; 6	WGI; 1; 7	WGI; 2; 8	LIM; 12	RAM; 5	LAG; 7	VIR; 18	ATL; 4			7th	2210
2022	McCann Racing	Grand Sport	Porsche 718 Cayman GT4 RS Clubsport	**DAY**; 25	SEB; 11	LGA; 10	MOH; 3	WGL; 16	MOS; 12	LIM; 12	ELK; 20	VIR; 14	ATL; 15			13th	1740
2023	Rebel Rock Racing	Grand Sport	Chevrolet Camaro GT4.R	DAY; 32	SEB	LGA	DET	WGL	MOS	ELK	VIR	IMS; 4	ATL			42nd	290
2024	Rebel Rock Racing	Grand Sport	Aston Martin Vantage AMR GT4 Evo	DAY; 9	SEB	LGA	MOH; 5	WGL								34th	610
2024	Ruckus Racing	Grand Sport	Aston Martin Vantage AMR GT4 Evo						MOS; 18	ELK	VIR	IMS	ATL			34th	610
2025	Rebel Rock Racing	Grand Sport	Aston Martin Vantage AMR GT4 Evo	DAY; 22	SEB	LGA	MOH; 8	WGL	MOS	ELK	VIR	IMS	ATL			50th	320
2026	Rebel Rock Racing	Grand Sport	Aston Martin Vantage AMR GT4 Evo	DAY; 1	SEB	LGA	MOH	WGL	MOS	ELK	VIR	IMS	ATL			46th	350

=== Complete IMSA SportsCar Championship results ===
(key) (Races in bold indicate pole position; results in italics indicate fastest lap)

Year	Team	Class	Make	Engine	1	2	3	4	5	6	7	8	9	10	11	12	Pos.	Points	Ref
2014	Dempsey Racing	GTD	Porsche 911 GT America	Porsche 4.0 L Flat-6	DAY; 24	SEB; 15	LGA; 20	DET; 17	WGL; 4	MOS; 11	IND; 9	ELK; 13	VIR; 3	COA; 14	PET; 18		19th	178	
2015	Alex Job Racing	GTD	Porsche 911 GT America	Porsche 4.0 L Flat-6	DAY; 2	SEB; 7	LGA	DET	WGL; 5	LIM	ELK	VIR	COA	PET			16th	109	
2016	Stevenson Motorsports	GTD	Audi R8 LMS	Audi DAR 5.2 L V10	DAY; 14	SEB; 8	LAG; 4	DET; 5	WGL; 11	MOS; 2	LIM; 2	ROA; 5	VIR; 3	COA; 10	PET; 7		4th	290	
2017	Stevenson Motorsports	GTD	Audi R8 LMS	Audi DAR 5.2 L V10	DAY; 4	SEB; 7	LBH; 13	COA; 10	DET; 13	WGL; 9	MOS; 1	LIM; 4	ELK; 3	VIR; 12	LGA; 11	PET; 13	7th	283	
2018	Magnus Racing	GTD	Audi R8 LMS	Audi DAR 5.2 L V10	DAY; 6	SEB; 13	MOH	BEL	WGL; 17	MOS	LIM	ELK	VIR	LGA	PET; 9		28th	79	
2019	Moorespeed	GTD	Audi R8 LMS Evo	Audi DAR 5.2 L V10	DAY; 11	SEB; 17	MOH	DET	WGL; DNS	MOS	LIM	ELK	VIR	LGA	PET		44th	34	
2020	Team Hardpoint	GTD	Audi R8 LMS Evo	Audi DAR 5.2 L V10	DAY	DAY	SEB	ELK	VIR	ATL	MOH	CLT	PET; 13	LGA	SEB; 5		34th	46	
2021	NTE Sport	GTD	Audi R8 LMS Evo	Audi DAR 5.2 L V10	DAY; 15	SEB	MOH	DET									34th	656	
2021	Team Hardpoint EBM	GTD	Porsche 911 GT3 R	Porsche 4.0 L Flat-6					WGL; 10	WGL	LIM	ELK	LGA	LBH	VIR	PET; 8	34th	656	
2023	Kelly-Moss with Riley	GTD	Porsche 911 GT3 R (992)	Porsche M97/80 4.2 L Flat-6	DAY; 21	SEB	LBH	LGA	WGL	MOS	LIM	ELK	VIR	IMS	ATL		70th	114	
