= 2026 McLaren Trophy America =

Second season of the McLaren Trophy America

The 2026 McLaren Trophy America was a motor racing championship for McLaren Artura Trophy cars and the second running of the McLaren Trophy America. It is organized and promoted by the SRO Motorsports Group. The championship began at Sonoma on March 27, and finished at Indianapolis on October 9.

== Calendar ==
Round	Circuit	Date	Supporting
1	(California) Sonoma Raceway	March 27–29	GT World Challenge America
2	(Florida) Miami International Autodrome	May 1–3	FIA Formula One World Championship
3	(Georgia (U.S. state)) Road Atlanta	June 12–24	GT World Challenge America
4	(Wisconsin) Road America	August 28–30	GT World Challenge America
5	(Indiana) Indianapolis Motor Speedway	October 7–9	Intercontinental GT Challenge; GT World Challenge America

== Entries ==
All teams use the McLaren Artura Trophy Evo. Pro-Am and Am drivers over a certain age or with limited experience, are eligible with the Papaya Cup.

Team	No.	Drivers	Class	Papaya Cup	Rounds
(United States) OMS	3	(United States) Scott Sorbaro	Am		1–3
(United States) OMS	4	(United States) Tony Davis	Am		2
(United States) OMS	15	(Brazil) Fabio Grecco	Am		1–3
(United States) OMS	49	(United States) Stephen Sorbaro	Am	PC	1–3
(United States) OMS	65	(United States) Matt Bell	P		2–3
(United States) OMS	65	(United States) Robby Stockard	P		2–3
(United States) GMG Racing	5	(United States) Jeff Cook	Am		1–3
(United States) GMG Racing	5	(United States) Deniz Teoman	Am	PC	1–3
(United States) GMG Racing	7	(United States) Randy Highland	PA	PC	1–3
(United States) GMG Racing	7	(United Kingdom) Michael O'Brien	PA		2–3
(United States) GMG Racing	7	(United States) John Capestro-Dubets	PA		1
(United States) Forte Racing	8	(United States) Paul Holton	P		1–3
(United States) Forte Racing	8	(United States) Kaia Teo	P		1–3
(United States) Forte Racing	24	(United States) Tanner Harvey	P		1–3
(United States) Forte Racing	24	(United States) Patrick Liddy	P		1–3
(United States) Forte Racing	100	(United States) Cooper Broll	Am		1–3
(United States) Relapsing Polychondritis Motorsports/Forte Racing	53	(United States) Neil Langberg	PA	PC	1–3
(United States) Relapsing Polychondritis Motorsports/Forte Racing	53	(United States) Kevin Madsen	PA		1–3
(United States) RWE Motorsport	11	(Spain) Tommy Pintos	PA		1–3
(United States) RWE Motorsport	11	(United States) Spencer Schmidt	PA		1
(United States) RWE Motorsport	11	(United States) Edmond Barseghian	PA		2–3
(United States) RWE Motorsport	47	(United States) Alex Pollard	Am		1
(United States) RWE Motorsport	47	(United States) Spencer Schmidt	PA		2–3
(United States) RWE Motorsport	47	(United States) Alex Pollard	PA		2
(United States) RWE Motorsport	47	(United States) Cody Kishel	PA		3
(United States) RWE Motorsport	74	(United States) James Li	P		1–3
(United States) RWE Motorsport	74	(United Kingdom) Sam Neser	P		1–3
(United States) ANSA	13	(United States) CR Sincock	Am	PC	2
(United States) ANSA	44	(United States) Ned MacPherson	Am	PC	2
(United States) TechSport Racing	21	(United States) Colin Harrison	Am		1–3
(United Kingdom) Greystone GT	22	(United States) Ryan James	PA		1–3
(United Kingdom) Greystone GT	22	(United Kingdom) Oliver Webb	PA		1–3
(United Kingdom) Greystone GT	80	(United Kingdom) Jon Lancaster	PA		2
(United Kingdom) Greystone GT	80	(United States) Ron Trenka	PA		2
(United States) Flying Lizard Motorsports	29	(United States) Johnny O'Connell	Am		1–3
(United States) Flying Lizard Motorsports	29	(United States) Philip Ploskas	Am	PC	1–3
(United States) Flying Lizard Motorsports	413	(United States) Zach Lumsden	Am		3
(United States) Aero-B	52	(Sweden) Erik Behrens	PA		2
(United States) Aero-B	52	(United Kingdom) Joe Osborne	PA		2
(Canada) Motorsports In Action	43	(United States) Alex Hainer	P		2
(Canada) Motorsports In Action	43	(Canada) Jesse Lazare	P		2
(Canada) Motorsports In Action	69	(United States) Bill Fenech	Am		2
(United States) Bryan Herta Autosport w/ Curb Agajanian	98	(United States) Daniel Hanley	P		3
(United States) Bryan Herta Autosport w/ Curb Agajanian	98	(United States) Bryson Morris	P		3
(United States) RAFA Racing Team	101	(United States) Keegan Massey	Am	PC	2
(United States) RAFA Racing Team	101	(Canada) Michael Steeves	Am	PC	2
(United States) RAFA Racing Team	812	(United States) Keegan Massey	Am	PC	1, 3
(United States) RAFA Racing Team	812	(Canada) Michael Steeves	Am	PC	1, 3

Icon	Class
P	Pro class
PA	Pro-Am class
Am	Am class
PC	Papaya Cup

== Results and standings ==
=== Race results ===
Bold indicates overall winner.

Round	Race	Circuit	Pole position	Pro Winners	Pro-Am Winners	Am Winners	Papaya Cup winners
1	R1	Sonoma Raceway	(United States) #8 Forte Racing	(United States) #24 Forte Racing	**(United States) #11 RWE Motorsport**	(United States) #100 Forte Racing	(United States) #5 GMG Racing
1	R1	Sonoma Raceway	(United States) Paul Holton (United States) Kaia Teo	(United States) Tanner Harvey (United States) Patrick Liddy	**(Spain) Tommy Pintos** **(United States) Spencer Schmidt**	(United States) Cooper Broll	(United States) Deniz Teoman
1	R2	Sonoma Raceway	(United States) #11 RWE Motorsport	(United States) #8 Forte Racing	**(United States) #11 RWE Motorsport**	(United States) #100 Forte Racing	(United States) #5 GMG Racing
1	R2	Sonoma Raceway	(Spain) Tommy Pintos (United States) Spencer Schmidt	(United States) Paul Holton (United States) Kaia Teo	**(Spain) Tommy Pintos** **(United States) Spencer Schmidt**	(United States) Cooper Broll	(United States) Deniz Teoman
2	R1	Miami International Autodrome	(United States) #5 GMG Racing	**(United States) #74 RWE Motorsport**	(United Kingdom) #22 Greystone GT	(United States) #5 GMG Racing	(United States) #5 GMG Racing
2	R1	Miami International Autodrome	(United States) Jeff Cook (United States) Deniz Teoman	**(United States) James Li** **(United Kingdom) Sam Neser**	(United States) Ryan James (United Kingdom) Oliver Webb	(United States) Jeff Cook (United States) Deniz Teoman	(United States) Deniz Teoman
2	R2	Miami International Autodrome	(United States) #74 RWE Motorsport	Race canceled due to weather.			
2	R2	Miami International Autodrome	(United States) James Li (United Kingdom) Sam Neser	Race canceled due to weather.			
3	R1	Road Atlanta	(United States) #5 GMG Racing	**(United States) #98 Bryan Herta Autosport w/ Curb Agajanian**	(United Kingdom) #22 Greystone GT	(United States) #15 OMS	(United States) #49 OMS
3	R1	Road Atlanta	(United States) Jeff Cook (United States) Deniz Teoman	**(United States) Daniel Hanley** **(United States) Bryson Morris**	(United States) Ryan James (United Kingdom) Oliver Webb	(Brazil) Fabio Grecco	(United States) Stephen Sorbaro
3	R2	Road Atlanta	(United States) #7 GMG Racing	**(United States) #5 GMG Racing**	(United States) #47 RWE Motorsport	(United States) #100 Forte Racing	(United States) #7 GMG Racing
3	R2	Road Atlanta	(United States) Randy Highland (United Kingdom) Michael O'Brien	**(United States) Jeff Cook** **(United States) Deniz Teoman**	(United States) Cody Kishel (United States) Spencer Schmidt	(United States) Cooper Broll	(United States) Randy Highland
4	R1	Road America					
4	R2	Road America					
5	R1	Indianapolis Motor Speedway					
5	R2	Indianapolis Motor Speedway					

== Championship standings ==
=== Scoring system ===
Drivers' points

Championship points are awarded for the first ten positions in each race.

Position	1st	2nd	3rd	4th	5th	6th	7th	8th
Points	12	9	7	5	4	3	2	1

=== Drivers' championship ===
Pos.	Driver	Team	SON		MIA		ATL		ELK		IND		Points
Pos.	Driver	Team	R1	R2	R1	R2	R1	R2	R1	R2	R1	R2	Points
Pro class
Pro-Am class
Am class
Pos.	Driver	Team	R1	R2	R1	R2	R1	R2	R1	R2	R1	R2	Points
Pos.	Driver	Team	SON		MIA		ATL		ELK		IND		Points

Colour	Result
Gold	Winner
Silver	Second place
Bronze	Third place
Green	Points classification
Blue	Non-points classification
Blue	Non-classified finish (NC)
Purple	Retired, not classified (Ret)
Red	Did not qualify (DNQ)
Red	Did not pre-qualify (DNPQ)
Black	Disqualified (DSQ)
White	Did not start (DNS)
White	Withdrew (WD)
White	Race cancelled (C)
Blank	Did not practice (DNP)
Blank	Did not arrive (DNA)
Blank	Excluded (EX)

== See also ==
- 2026 McLaren Trophy Europe
