= 2025 McLaren Trophy America =

First season of the McLaren Trophy America

The 2025 McLaren Trophy America was a motor racing championship for McLaren Artura Trophy cars and the first running of the McLaren Trophy America. It was organized and promoted by the SRO Motorsports Group. The championship began at Sonoma on March 28, and ended at Indianapolis on October 17.

== Calendar ==
Round	Circuit	Date	Supporting
1	(California) Sonoma Raceway	March 28–30	GT World Challenge America
2	(Texas) Circuit of the Americas	April 25–27	GT World Challenge America
3	Virginia International Raceway	July 18–20	GT World Challenge America
4	(Wisconsin) Road America	August 15–17	GT World Challenge America
5	(Indiana) Indianapolis Motor Speedway	October 16–18	Intercontinental GT Challenge; GT World Challenge America

=== Calendar changes ===
After race 2 for the Sonoma Raceway round was cancelled, a third race for the Circuit of the Americas round was added.

== Entries ==
All teams use the McLaren Artura Trophy. Additionally, from the round at Virginia International Raceway, Pro-Am and Am drivers over a certain age or with limited experience, are eligible with the Papaya Cup.

Team	No.	Drivers	Class	Papaya Cup	Rounds
(United States) Flying Lizard Motorsports	3	(United States) Spencer Bucknum	PA		1–3
(United States) Flying Lizard Motorsports	3	(United States) George Lawrence	PA		1–3
(United States) Flying Lizard Motorsports	18	(United States) Brandon Kreutz	PA	PC	All
(United States) Flying Lizard Motorsports	18	(United States) Canaan O'Connell	PA		All
(United States) GMG Racing	4	(United States) John Capestro-Dubets	PA 1 P 2–3		1–3
(United States) GMG Racing	4	(United States) Andrew Chinnici	PA 1 P 2–3		1
(United States) GMG Racing	4	(Costa Rica) André Solano	PA 1 P 2–3		2
(United States) GMG Racing	14	(United States) James Sofronas	Am		All
(United States) Dark Horse Racing	5	(United States) Jeff Cook	Am		All
(United States) Dark Horse Racing	5	(United States) Deniz Teoman	Am	PC	All
(United States) RWE Motorsport	10	(United States) Andrew Davis	PA		All
(United States) RWE Motorsport	10	(United States) John Dempsey	PA		All
(United States) RWE Motorsport	74	(United States) Casey Dennis	P		All
(United States) RWE Motorsport	74	(United States) James Li	P		All
(United States) Moonfire Motorsports	11	(Australia) Kezia Dawn	Am		2
(United States) Moonfire Motorsports	11	(United States) Vince Zampella	Am		2
(United States) Riley Motorsports	17	(United States) Eric Filgueiras	PA		1–4
(United States) Riley Motorsports	17	(United States) Tom Kopczynski	PA	PC	1–4
(United States) TechSport	21	(United States) Colin Harrison	Am		All
(United States) Forte Racing	24	(United States) Tanner Harvey	PA		4–5
(United States) Forte Racing	24	(United States) Patrick Liddy	PA		4–5
(United States) RP Motorsports by Forte Racing	53	(United States) Neil Langberg	Am	PC	All
(United States) RP Motorsports by Forte Racing	53	(United States) Kevin Madsen	Am		All
(Canada) Motorsports In Action	43	(United States) Alexandra Hainer	PA		All
(Canada) Motorsports In Action	43	(Canada) Jesse Lazare	PA		All
(United States) OMS	49	(United States) Stephen Sorbaro	Am	PC	All
(United States) AERO-B Motorsports	52	(Puerto Rico) Jason Guzman	PA		1–2, 4–5
(United States) AERO-B Motorsports	52	(United States) Chris Leichtweis	PA	PC	1–2, 4–5
(United States) Skip Barber Racing	919	(United States) Cooper Broll	P		All
(United States) Skip Barber Racing	919	(Spain) Tommy Pintos	P		All
(United States) Hooper Street Racing	56	(United States) Bob Stockard	Am	PC	All
(United States) Hooper Street Racing	56	(United States) Robby Stockard	Am		1–2, 4
(United States) RAFA Racing Club	812	(United Kingdom) Jon Lancaster	PA		2
(United States) RAFA Racing Club	812	(United States) Rafael Martinez	PA		2
(United States) RAFA Racing Club	812	(United States) Keegan Massey	Am		5
(United States) RAFA Racing Club	812	(Canada) Michael Steeves	Am		5

Icon	Class
P	Pro class
PA	Pro-Am class
Am	Am class
PC	Papaya Cup

== Results and standings ==
=== Race results ===
Bold indicates overall winner.

Round	Race	Circuit	Pole position	Pro Winners	Pro-Am Winners	Am Winners	Papaya Cup Winners
1	R1	Sonoma Raceway	(United States) John Capestro-Dubets (United States) K.C. King	(United States) Casey Dennis (United States) James Li	**(United States) John Capestro-Dubets** **(United States) K.C. King**	(United States) Colin Harrison	
1	R2	Sonoma Raceway	Postponed - weather; Made-up at the following round in COTA				
2	R1	Circuit of the Americas	(United States) Cooper Broll (Spain) Tommy Pintos	**(United States) Casey Dennis** **(United States) James Li**	(United States) Alexandra Hainer (Canada) Jesse Lazare	(United States) James Sofronas	
2	R2	Circuit of the Americas	(United States) James Sofronas	**(United States) John Capestro-Dubets** **(Costa Rica) André Solano**	(United States) Alexandra Hainer (Canada) Jesse Lazare	(United States) James Sofronas	
2	R3	Circuit of the Americas	(United States) John Capestro-Dubets (Costa Rica) André Solano	**(United States) John Capestro-Dubets** **(Costa Rica) André Solano**	(United Kingdom) Jon Lancaster (United States) Rafael Martinez	(United States) James Sofronas	
3	R1	Virginia International Raceway	(United States) Cooper Broll (Spain) Tommy Pintos	(United States) Casey Dennis (United States) James Li	**(United States) Andrew Davis** **(United States) John Dempsey**	(United States) Jeff Cook (United States) Deniz Teoman	(United States) Deniz Teoman
3	R2	Virginia International Raceway	(United States) Jeff Cook (United States) Deniz Teoman	**(United States) Casey Dennis** **(United States) James Li**	(United States) Andrew Davis (United States) John Dempsey	(United States) James Sofronas	(United States) Stephen Sorbaro
4	R1	Road America	(United States) Cooper Broll (Spain) Tommy Pintos	**(United States) Cooper Broll** **(Spain) Tommy Pintos**	(United States) Tanner Harvey (United States) Patrick Liddy	(United States) James Sofronas	(United States) Bob Stockard
4	R2	Road America	(United States) Neil Langberg (United States) Kevin Madsen	**(United States) Cooper Broll** **(Spain) Tommy Pintos**	(United States) Andrew Davis (United States) John Dempsey	(United States) Colin Harrison	(United States) Stephen Sorbaro
5	R1	Indianapolis Motor Speedway	(United States) James Sofronas	(United States) Casey Dennis (United States) James Li	**(United States) Tanner Harvey** **(United States) Patrick Liddy**	(United States) Colin Harrison	(United States) Deniz Teoman
5	R2	Indianapolis Motor Speedway	(United States) Cooper Broll (Spain) Tommy Pintos	**(United States) Cooper Broll** **(Spain) Tommy Pintos**	(United States) Tanner Harvey (United States) Patrick Liddy	(United States) James Sofronas	(United States) Stephen Sorbaro

== Championship standings ==
=== Scoring system ===
Drivers' points

Championship points are awarded for the first ten positions in each race.

Position	1st	2nd	3rd	4th	5th	6th	7th	8th	9th	10th
Points	15	12	10	8	6	5	4	3	2	1

=== Drivers' championship ===
Pos.	Driver	Team	SON		AUS		VIR		ELK (Note: Race 1 was abandoned with 30 minutes to go due to weather conditions; half points were awarded.)		IND		Points
Pos.	Driver	Team	R1	R2	R1	R2	R1	R2	R1	R2	R1	R2	Points
Pro class
1	(United States) Casey Dennis (United States) James Li	(United States) RWE Motorsport	1	1	3	3	1	1	2	2	1	2	125
2	(United States) Cooper Broll (Spain) Tommy Pintos	(United States) Skip Barber Racing	2	3	2	2	2	2	1	1	2	1	119.5
3	(United States) John Capestro-Dubets	(United States) GMG Racing		2	1	1	DNS						42
4	(Costa Rica) André Solano	(United States) GMG Racing		2	1	1							42
Pro-Am class
1	(United States) Alexandra Hainer (Canada) Jesse Lazare	(Canada) Motorsports In Action	7	1	1	2	2	2	1	2	1	1	119.5
2	(United States) Andrew Davis (United States) John Dempsey	(United States) RWE Motorsport	2	6	2	5	1	1	2	1	2	4	106
3	(United States) Brandon Kreutz (United States) Canaan O'Connell	(United States) Flying Lizard Motorsports	4	3	3	4	3	4	4	4	3	2	88
4	(United States) Eric Filgueiras (United States) Tom Kopczynski	(United States) Riley Motorsports	3	5	6	6	4	3	3	3			59
5	(Puerto Rico) Jason Guzman (United States) Chris Leichtweis	(United States) AERO-B Motorsports	6	2					5		4	3	38
6	(United States) Spencer Bucknum (United States) George Lawrence	(United States) Flying Lizard Motorsports	5	4	4	3							32
7	(United Kingdom) Jon Lancaster (United States) Rafael Martinez	(United States) RAFA Racing Club			5	1							21
8	(United States) John Capestro-Dubets (United States) Andrew Chinnici	(United States) GMG Racing	1										15
Am class
1	(United States) James Sofronas	(United States) GMG Racing	2	1	1	1	4	1	1	2	2	1	126.5
2	(United States) Colin Harrison	(United States) TechSport	1	2	2	2	6	2	3	1	1	2	115
3	(United States) Stephen Sorbaro	(United States) OMS	4	5	7	3	3	3	4	3	4	3	80
4	(United States) Jeff Cook (United States) Deniz Teoman	(United States) Dark Horse Racing	3	4	4	5	1	4	6	5	3	6	78.5
5	(United States) Kevin Madsen (United States) Neil Langberg	(United States) RP Motorsports by Forte Racing	5	6	3	7	2	5	5	4	5	4	68
7	(United States) Bob Stockard	(United States) Hooper Street Racing	6	3	5	6	5	6	2	6	6	5	59
8	(United States) Robby Stockard	(United States) Hooper Street Racing		3	5	6			2	6			32
9	(Puerto Rico) Jason Guzman (United States) Chris Leichtweis	(United States) AERO-B Motorsports			6	4							13
Pos.	Driver	Team	SON		AUS		VIR		ELK		IND		Points

Key
Colour	Result
Gold	Race winner
Silver	2nd place
Bronze	3rd place
Green	Points finish
Blue	Non-points finish
Blue	Non-classified finish (NC)
Purple	Did not finish (Ret)
Black	Disqualified (DSQ)
Black	Excluded (EX)
White	Did not start (DNS)
White	Race cancelled (C)
White	Withdrew (WD)
Blank	Did not participate

== See also ==
- 2025 McLaren Trophy Europe
