= Tommy Pintos =

Spanish racing driver (born 2005)

- Nationality: (Spain) Spanish
- Born: 22 December 2005 (age 20) Cabanillas del Campo, Spain

GT World Challenge Europe Endurance Cup career
- Debut season: 2026
- Current team: Greystone GT
- Categorisation: FIA Silver
- Car number: 44
- Starts: 5
- Wins: 0
- Podiums: 0
- Poles: 0
- Fastest laps: 0
- Best finish: NC in 2026

Previous series
- 2023–2024 2022 2020: McLaren Trophy Europe; Iberian Supercars Endurance Championship; Ginetta Junior Championship

Championship titles
- 2023: McLaren Trophy Europe – Artura Trophy

Tomás "Tommy" Pintos Aragonés (born 22 December 2005) is a Spanish racing driver who last competed in the GT World Challenge Europe Endurance Cup for Greystone GT and McLaren Trophy America for RWE Motorsport.

== Career ==
Pintos began karting at the age of 3 and competed until 2018. Starting out in micro karts, Pintos won the 2014 Madrid Karting Championship in the Micro Max class, earning an invitation to the RMC Grand Finals, in which he finished fourth. Moving to Mini karts in 2016, Pintos most notably finished tenth in the Andrea Margutti Trophy in 2017, before stepping up to junior karts the following year.

Pintos moved to autocross in 2019, placing third in the Junior Car Cross standings of the Spanish Autocross Championship. Focusing on circuit racing for 2020, Pintos joined Elite Motorsport to compete in the Ginetta Junior Championship. In his debut season in the series, Pintos scored a lone podium at Snetterton en route to seventh in points. Pintos was set to return to the team for 2021, but was unable to re-enter the United Kingdom after the COVID-19 pandemic and spent the year testing and sim racing for DUX Gaming.

Returning to competition in 2022, Pintos joined McLaren-affiliated SMC Motorsport in Iberian Supercars. Racing in the GT4 Pro class alongside Guillermo Aso, Pintos took class wins at Algarve and Estoril to secure third in points. In 2023, Pintos remained with SMC to contest the new McLaren Trophy Europe. Sharing a McLaren Artura with Gonzalo de Andrés, the pair took four wins and five other podiums to secure the inaugural series title. Staying at SMC for his title defence in 2024, Pintos scored three wins to end the year runner-up in the Artura Trophy standings with Adalberto Baptista.

In 2025, Pintos joined Skip Barber Racing to move to the newly-created McLaren Trophy America, as a McLaren Graduate Driver. In his rookie season in the series, Pintos won both races at Road America and the finale at Indianapolis to secure runner-up honours in the Pro standings. In 2026, Pintos switched to RWE Motorsport for his second season in the series, as well as graduating to the GT World Challenge Europe Endurance Cup with Greystone GT as a member of the McLaren GT3 Junior Driver roster. In the former, Pintos primarily competed in Pro-Am, taking two overall wins with Spencer Schmidt at Sonoma and two other podiums to take fourth in points.

== Karting record ==
=== Karting career summary ===
Season	Series	Team	Position
2014	RMC Grand Finals – Micro Max		4th
2017	Andrea Margutti Trophy – 60 Mini	Gamoto ASD	10th
2018	IAME Winter Cup – X30 Junior		14th

== Racing record ==
=== Racing career summary ===
Season	Series	Team	Races	Wins	Poles	F/Laps	Podiums	Points	Position
2020	Ginetta Junior Championship	Elite Motorsport	21	0	0	0	1	269	7th
2022	Iberian Supercars Endurance Championship – GT4 Pro	SMC Motorsport	8	2	0	1	5	134	**3rd**
2023	McLaren Trophy Europe – Artura Trophy	SMC Motorsport	9	4	?	?	9		**1st**
2024	McLaren Trophy Europe – Artura Trophy	SMC Motorsport	10	3	?	?	7		**2nd**
2025	McLaren Trophy America – Pro	Skip Barber Racing	10	3	4	0	10	119.5	**2nd**
2025	GT Cup Open Europe – Pro-Am	SMC Motorsport	2	0	0	0	0	3	12th
2026	McLaren Trophy America – Pro-Am	RWE Motorsport	7	2	1	0	4	55	4th
2026	McLaren Trophy America – Pro	RWE Motorsport	1	0	0	0	0	0	NC†
2026	GT World Challenge Europe Endurance Cup	Greystone GT	5	0	0	0	0	0	NC
2026	GT World Challenge Europe Endurance Cup – Silver	Greystone GT	5	0	0	0	0	2	35th

^{†} As Pintos was a guest driver, he was ineligible to score points.

=== Complete Ginetta Junior Championship results ===
(key) (Races in bold indicate pole position) (Races in italics indicate fastest lap)

Year	Team	1	2	3	4	5	6	7	8	9	10	11	12	13	14	15	16	17	18	19	20	21	DC	Points
2020	Elite Motorsport	DON; 1 (12)	DON; 2; 11	DON; 3; 4	BHGP; 1; 8	BHGP; 2; 7	BHGP; 3; 10	KNO; 1; 11	KNO; 2; 10	KNO; 3; 10	THR; 1 (19)	THR; 2; 7	SIL; 1; 10	SIL; 2; 10	SIL; 3; 11	CRO; 1; 8	CRO; 2; 10	SNE; 1; 4	SNE; 2; 3	SNE; 3; 5	BHI; 1 Ret	BHI; 2; 8	7th	269

=== Complete GT World Challenge Europe results ===
==== GT World Challenge Europe Endurance Cup ====
(key) (Races in bold indicate pole position) (Races in italics indicate fastest lap)

Year	Team	Car	Class	1	2	3	4	5	6	7	Pos.	Points
2026	Greystone GT	McLaren 720S GT3 Evo	Silver	LEC; Ret	MNZ; 42†	SPA; 6H; 34	SPA; 12H; 52	SPA; 24H; 37	NÜR; Ret	ALG; Ret	35th	2
