= 2023 Grand Prix of Long Beach =

Third round of the 2023 IMSA SportsCar Championship season

The layout of the Long Beach Street Circuit

The 2023 Grand Prix of Long Beach (formally known as the Acura Grand Prix of Long Beach) was a sports car race held at Long Beach Street Circuit in Long Beach, California on April 15, 2023. It was the third round of the 2023 IMSA SportsCar Championship and the first round of the 2023 WeatherTech Sprint Cup.

The No. 10 Acura driven by Filipe Albuquerque won the pole position by posting the fastest lap in qualifying and held the lead until a slow pit stop. This handed the lead to Mathieu Jaminet in the No. 6 Porsche who held the first position until 2 laps remaining. Ricky Taylor attempted a pass at turn one, but crashed into the tire barrier and handed Jaminet the victory. The No. 25 BMW of Connor De Phillippi and Nick Yelloly finished in second, and the No. 7 Porsche Penske Motorsport car of Matt Campbell and Felipe Nasr came in third.

Ben Barnicoat and Jack Hawksworth in the No. 14 Vasser Sullivan Racing Lexus were unchallenged throughout the race and took the victory in the Grand Touring Daytona Professional (GTD Pro) class ahead of second-placed No. 3 Corvette Racing drivers Antonio García and Jordan Taylor. The Grand Touring Daytona (GTD) class was won by Bryan Sellers and Madison Snow after they took the lead during the pit stop cycle to secure their second victory of the season, and was followed by the No. 27 Heart of Racing Team car of Roman De Angelis and Marco Sørensen.

The result meant Jaminet and Tandy took over the lead of the GTP Drivers' Championship with 955 points. Matt Campbell and Felipe Nasr moved from sixth to fifth while Pipo Derani and Alexander Sims dropped from first to second. Cadillac remained in the lead of the Manufcatures' Championship, but their advantage was reduced to 41 points as BMW and Porsche jumped one position each. In the GTD Pro Drivers' Championship, Barnicoat and Hawksworth the lead from Jules Gounon and Daniel Juncadella as Lexus took lead of the GTD Pro Manufactures' Championship. Sellers and Snow jumped from second to first in the GTD Drivers' Championship with 1008 points, as BMW took the lead of the GTD Manufactures' Championship with eight races left in the season.

== Background ==
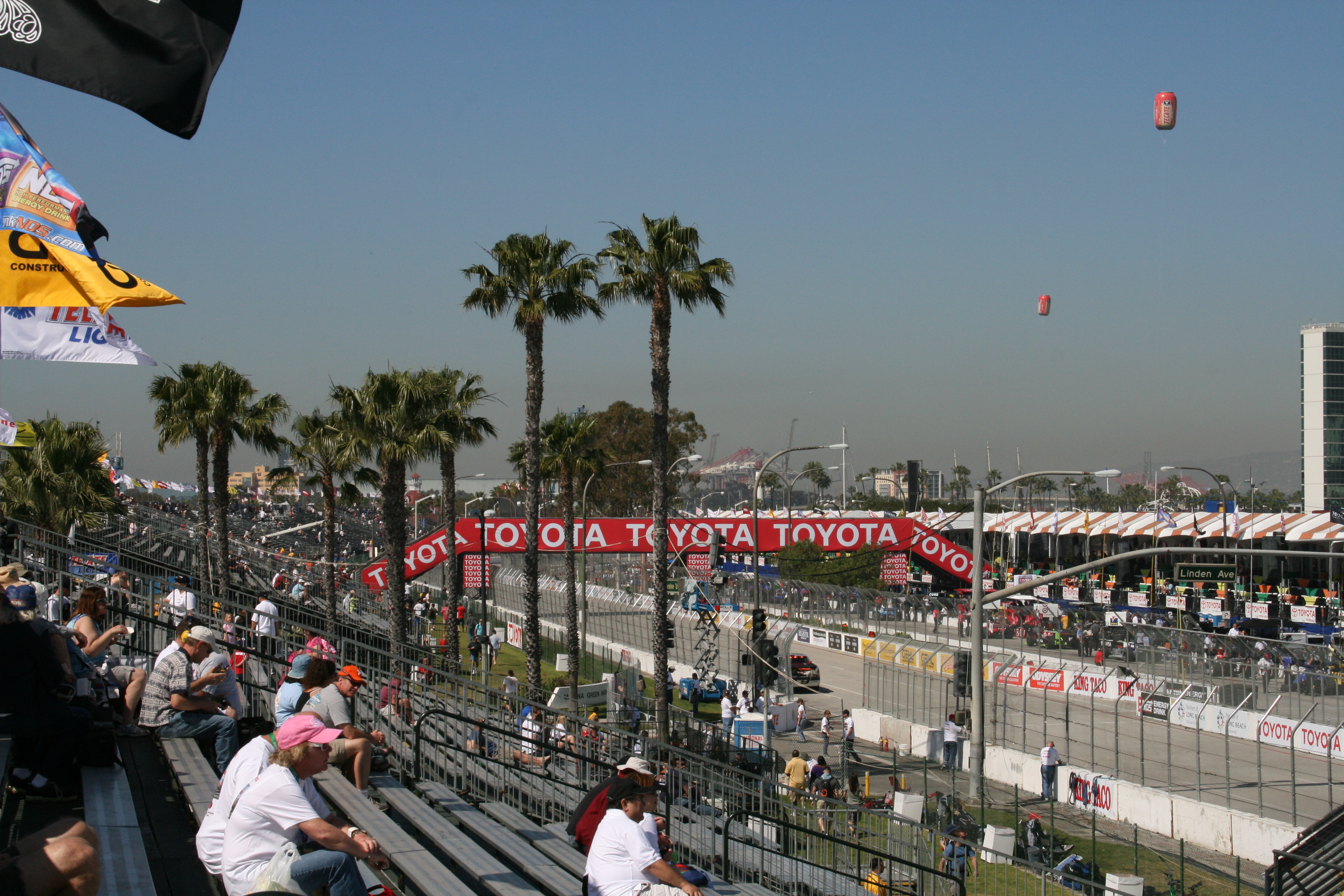
The Long Beach Street Circuit (pictured in 2009), where the race was held.

International Motor Sports Association's (IMSA) president John Doonan confirmed the race was part of the schedule for the 2023 IMSA SportsCar Championship (IMSA SCC) in August 2022. It was the ninth year the event was held as part of the WeatherTech SportsCar Championship, and the fifteenth annual running of the race, counting the period between 2006 and 2013 when it was a round of the Rolex Sports Car Series and the American Le Mans Series respectively. The 2023 Grand Prix of Long Beach was the third of eleven scheduled sports car races of 2023 by IMSA, the shortest of the season in terms of distance, and it was the first round held as part of the WeatherTech Sprint Cup. The race was held at the eleven-turn 1.968 mi (3.167 km) Long Beach street circuit on April 15, 2023.

After the 12 Hours of Sebring four weeks earlier, Pipo Derani, Alexander Sims, and Jack Aitken led the GTP Drivers' Championship with 670 points, ahead of Filipe Albuquerque, Ricky Taylor, and Louis Delétraz with 660 points followed by Sébastien Bourdais, Renger van der Zande, and Scott Dixon with 600 points. With 708 points, GTD Pro was led by Jules Gounon, Daniel Juncadella, and Maro Engel with a twenty-six point advantage over Ben Barnicoat and Jack Hawksworth. In GTD, the Drivers' Championship was led by Brendan Iribe, Ollie Millroy, and Frederik Schandorff with 629 points; the trio held a one-point gap over Corey Lewis, Bryan Sellers, and Madison Snow. Cadillac, Mercedes-AMG, and McLaren were leading their respective Manufacturers' Championships, while Whelen Engineering Racing, WeatherTech Racing, and Inception Racing each led their own Teams' Championships.

On April 3, 2023, IMSA released the latest technical bulletin outlining Balance of Performance for the GTP, GTD Pro, and GTD classes. In GTP, all cars received weight reductions compared to Sebring. The Cadillac ran at the lowest weight (1031 kg), with the BMW and Porsche at 1036 kg, and the Acura at 1045 kg. As a result, the Cadillac ran on 513 kilowatts of power, while the BMW ran on 515 kW (up 2 kW from Sebring), the Porsche ran on 515 kW (down 2 kW from Sebring), and the Acura on 520 kW. Maximum stint energy figures were also adjusted. In GTD Pro and GTD, the Acura and BMW received weight adjustments. The Corvette, Lamborghini, and the Mercedes received air restrictor size changes. Other changes included a change in fuel tank capacity for almost all cars, except the BMW and Mercedes, and an adjustment of average power delta.

=== Entries ===
A total of 28 cars took part in the event, split across three classes. 8 were entered in GTP, 5 in GTD Pro, and 15 in GTD. Risi Competizione and Iron Lynx were absent in GTD Pro while Turner Motorsport moved its entry to GTD. In GTD, Jeroen Bleekmeolen replaced David Brule in the #92 Kelly-Moss lineup. Wright Motorsports scaled down to 1 car after initially citing BoP concerns and scaling back their #16 entry to only contesting the Michelin Endurance Cup. Racers Edge Motorsports with WTR added a partial sprint campaign in addition to committing to the Michelin Endurance Cup.

== Practice ==
There were two practice sessions preceding the start of the race on Saturday, one on Friday morning and one on Friday afternoon. The first session lasted one hour on Friday morning while the second session on Friday afternoon lasted 105 minutes.

=== Practice 1 ===
The first practice session took place at 9:00 AM PT on Friday after being delayed by ten minutes due to the opening practice for Porsche Deluxe Carrera Cup North America having track communication issues which delayed the practice session. Eventually, opening practice for the IMSA SportsCar Championship got underway and ended with Ricky Taylor topping the charts for Wayne Taylor Racing with Andretti Autosport, with a lap time of 1:11.942. Tom Blomqvist was second fastest in the No. 60 Acura followed by Mathieu Jaminet in the No. 6 Porsche Penske Motorsport entry. The GTD Pro class was topped by the #23 Heart of Racing Team Aston Martin Vantage AMR GT3 of Alex Riberas with a time of 1:19.303, 0.071 seconds faster than Jack Hawksworth's No. 14 Lexus. Alec Udell was fastest in GTD with a time of 1:19.488, ahead of Loris Spinelli in the No. 78 Forte Racing Powered by US RaceTronics entry.

Pos.	Class	No.	Team	Driver	Time	Gap
1	GTP	10	Wayne Taylor Racing with Andretti Autosport	Ricky Taylor	1:11.942	_
2	GTP	60	Meyer Shank Racing with Curb-Agajanian	Tom Blomqvist	1:12.800	+0.858
3	GTP	6	Porsche Penske Motorsport	Mathieu Jaminet	1:13.550	+1.608

=== Final Practice ===
The second and final practice session took place at 12:45 PM PT on Friday and ended with Tom Blomqvist topping the charts for Meyer Shank Racing with Curb-Agajanian, with a lap time of 1:10.391. Filipe Albuquerque was second fastest in the No. 10 Acura followed by Nick Yelloly in the No. 25 BMW M Team RLL entry. The GTD Pro class was topped by the #14 Vasser Sullivan Racing Lexus RC F GT3 of Jack Hawksworth with a time of 1:17.876. Patrick Pilet was second in the No. 9 Pfaff Motorsports Porsche and Antonio García rounded out the top 3. Mario Farnbacher was fastest in GTD with a time of 1:18.516.

Pos.	Class	No.	Team	Driver	Time	Gap
1	GTP	60	Meyer Shank Racing with Curb-Agajanian	Tom Blomqvist	1:10.391	_
2	GTP	10	Wayne Taylor Racing with Andretti Autosport	Filipe Albuquerque	1:10.714	+0.323
3	GTP	25	BMW M Team RLL	Nick Yelloly	1:11.693	+1.302

== Qualifying ==
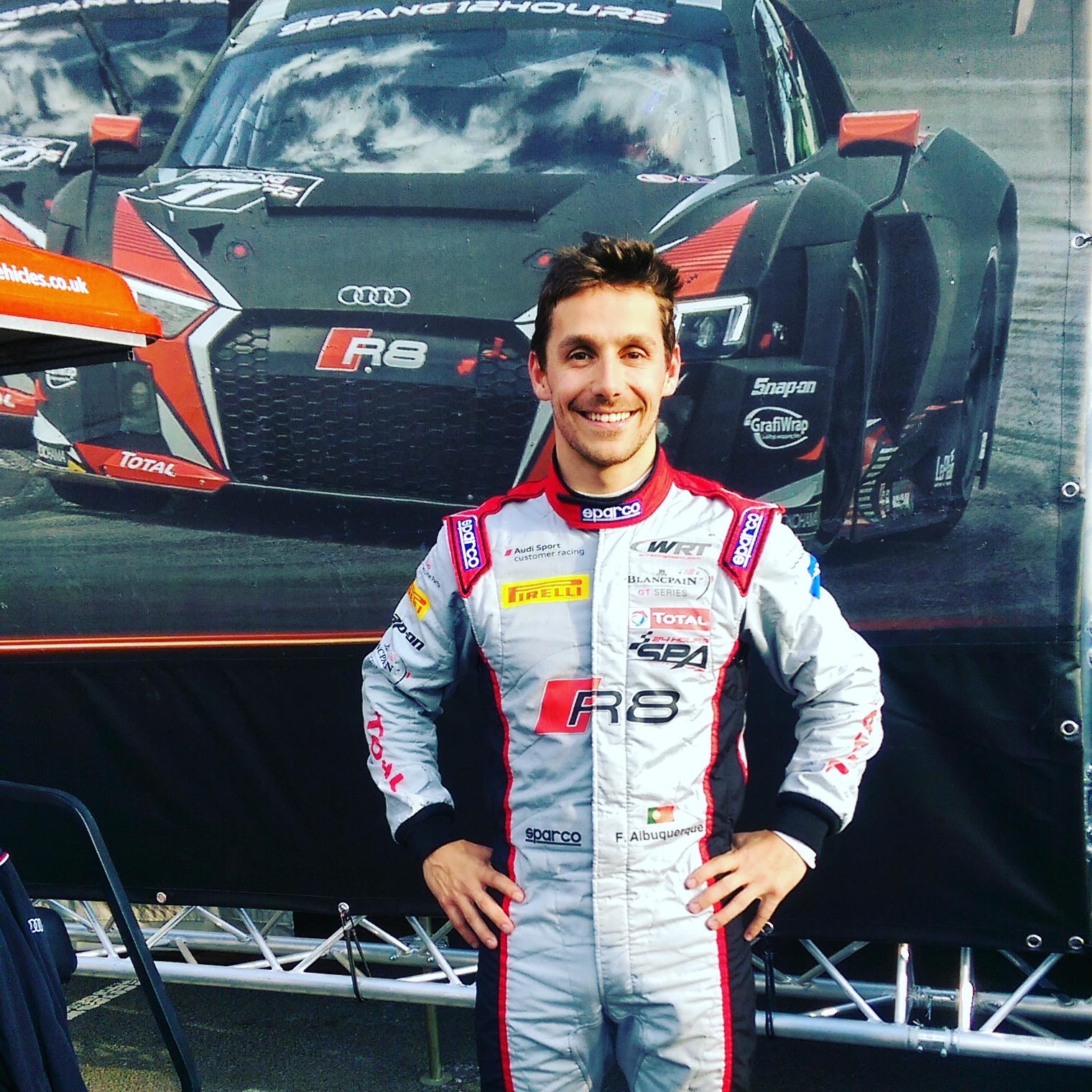
Filipe Albuquerque (pictured in 2016) took the overall pole position for Wayne Taylor Racing with Andretti Autosport.

Friday's qualification session was divided into two groups with the first session lasting 15 minutes while the second session lasted 20 minutes. Cars in GTD Pro and GTD were sent out first. After a ten-minute interval, GTP vehicles drove onto the track. Regulations stipulated teams to nominate one qualifying driver, with the fastest laps determining each classes starting order. IMSA arranged the grid to put GTP vehicles ahead of the GTD Pro and GTD cars.

Qualifying was broken into two sessions. The first was cars in the GTD Pro and GTD classes. Jack Hawksworth qualified on pole in GTD Pro driving the No. 14 Vasser Sullivan Racing entry, beating Ross Gunn in the No. 23 Heart of Racing Team entry by 0.141 seconds. Following in third was Pilet's No. 9 Porsche. The No. 3 Corvette Racing Chevrolet Corvette C8.R GTD and the No. 79 WeatherTech Racing Mercedes rounded out the GTD Pro qualifiers. Marco Sørensen set the fastest time among all GTD cars driving the No. 27 car for Heart of Racing Team, 0.006 seconds faster than GTD Pro pole winner Hawksworth. Sørensen was five-tenths clear of Frankie Montecalvo in the No. 12 Lexus followed by Madison Snow in the No. 1 Paul Miller Racing Car in third. The session was shortened after Ashton Harrison driving the No. 93 car for Racers Edge Motorsports with WTR crashed at turn eight. Moments later, P. J. Hyett driving the No. 80 car for AO Racing Team also crashed at turn eight. The Racers Edge Motorsports Acura caught fire and Harrison walked away from the accident. Hyett walked away from the incident unhurt. For causing the red flag, both the No. 93 and No. 80 had their best two times from the session deleted. Due to the extensive damage on their cars, Racers Edge Motorsports with WTR and AO Racing Team withdrew from the event.

The final session of qualifying was for the GTP class. Several teams scrubbed tires in the first half of the session for the race. Filipe Albuquerque qualified on pole driving the #10 car for Wayne Taylor Racing with Andretti Autosport, beating Tom Blomqvist in the #60 Meyer Shank Racing with Curb-Agajanian entry by over six-tenths of a second. Following in third was the No. 01 Cadillac of Sébastien Bourdais, with the No. 25 BMW of Nick Yelloly in fourth. Augusto Farfus completed the top 5 in the slower No. 24 BMW. Porsche Penske Motorsport were sixth and eighth: Nick Tandy in the No. 6 car was faster than the sister No. 7 entry of Felipe Nasr. They were separated by the seventh-placed Alexander Sims in the No. 31 Whelen Engineering Racing Cadillac V-Series.R.

=== Qualifying results ===
Pole positions in each class are indicated in bold and by ‡.

Pos.	Class	No.	Team	Driver	Time	Gap	Grid
1	**GTP**	**10**	**(United States) Wayne Taylor Racing with Andretti Autosport**	**(Portugal) Filipe Albuquerque**	**1:09.909**	**_**	1‡
2	GTP	60	(United States) Meyer Shank Racing with Curb-Agajanian	(United Kingdom) Tom Blomqvist	1:10.583	+0.674	2
3	GTP	01	(United States) Cadillac Racing	(France) Sébastien Bourdais	1:10.981	+1.072	3
4	GTP	25	(United States) BMW M Team RLL	(United Kingdom) Nick Yelloly	1:11.002	+1.093	4
5	GTP	24	(United States) BMW M Team RLL	(Brazil) Augusto Farfus	1:11.368	+1.459	5
6	GTP	6	(Germany) Porsche Penske Motorsport	(United Kingdom) Nick Tandy	1:11.406	+1.497	6
7	GTP	31	(United States) Whelen Engineering Racing	(United Kingdom) Alexander Sims	1:11.410	+1.501	7
8	GTP	7	(Germany) Porsche Penske Motorsport	(Brazil) Felipe Nasr	1:11.591	+1.682	8
9	**GTD**	**27**	**(United States) Heart of Racing Team**	**(Denmark) Marco Sørensen**	**1:17.811**	**+7.902**	9‡
10	**GTD Pro**	**14**	(United States) **Vasser Sullivan Racing**	**(United Kingdom) Jack Hawksworth**	**1:17.817**	**+7.908**	10‡
11	GTD Pro	23	(United States) Heart of Racing Team	(United Kingdom) Ross Gunn	1:17.958	+8.049	11
12	GTD Pro	9	(Canada) Pfaff Motorsports	(France) Patrick Pilet	1:18.083	+8.174	12
13	GTD Pro	3	(United States) Corvette Racing	(Spain) Antonio García	1:18.329	+8.420	16
14	GTD	12	(United States) Vasser Sullivan Racing	(United States) Frankie Montecalvo	1:18.376	+8.467	17
15	GTD	1	(United States) Paul Miller Racing	(United States) Madison Snow	1:18.383	+8.474	13
16	GTD	32	(United States) Team Korthoff Motorsports	(United States) Mike Skeen	1:18.455	+8.546	14
17	GTD	78	(United States) Forte Racing Powered by US RaceTronics	(Canada) Misha Goikhberg	1:18.831	+8.922	15
18	GTD	57	(United States) Winward Racing	(United States) Russell Ward	1:18.943	+9.034	18
19	GTD	97	(United States) Turner Motorsport	(United States) Chandler Hull	1:19.159	+9.250	19
20	GTD	96	(United States) Turner Motorsport	(United States) Patrick Gallagher	1:19.171	+9.262	20
21	GTD	70	(United Kingdom) Inception Racing	(United States) Brendan Iribe	1:19.188	+9.279	21
22	GTD Pro	79	(United States) WeatherTech Racing	(Spain) Daniel Juncadella	1:19.436	+9.527	22
23	GTD	93	(United States) Racers Edge Motorsports with WTR	(United States) Ashton Harrison	1:19.583	+9.674	27^{1}
24	GTD	77	(United States) Wright Motorsports	(United States) Alan Brynjolfsson	1;19.629	+9.720	25^{2}
25	GTD	66	(United States) Gradient Racing	(United States) Sheena Monk	1:19.716	+9.807	26^{3}
26	GTD	80	(United States) AO Racing Team	(United States) P. J. Hyett	1:19.767	+9.858	28^{4}
27	GTD	92	(United States) Kelly-Moss w/ Riley	(Netherlands) Jeroen Bleekemolen	1:19.807	+9.989	23
28	GTD	91	(United States) Kelly-Moss w/ Riley	(United States) Alan Metni	1:20.789	+10.880	24
Sources:

- ^{1} The No. 93 Racers Edge Motorsports with WTR entry had its two fastest laps deleted as penalty for causing a red flag during its qualifying session.
- ^{2} The No. 77 Wright Motorsports started at the rear of the GTD class after deciding to change their starting race tires.
- ^{3} The No. 66 Gradient Racing entry started at the rear of the GTD class after deciding to change their starting race tires.
- ^{4} The No. 80 AO Racing Team entry had its two fastest laps deleted as penalty for causing a red flag during its qualifying session.

== Race ==
Weather conditions at the start were dry and clear. The race began at 2:05 pm Pacific Standard Time (UTC−08:00).

Albuquerque maintained his pole position advantage while Tom Blomqvist blocked Sébastien Bourdais. Bourdais lifted to avoid touching the rear of the No. 60 Acura. Moments later, the No. 01 Cadillac was on the marbles and Bourdais outbraked himself going into turn one and crashed into the barrier. Blomqvist's Acura was tagged by the No. 25 BMW of Nick Yelloly, sending the Acura into a spin. The No. 01 Cadillac and No. 60 Acura came to a stop at the turn one runoff area. Blomqvist stalled his Acura and a full course caution was displayed soon after. Blomqvist lost a lap and continued while Bourdais's Cadillac retired due to heavy nose damage.

Racing resumed with 90 minutes remaining with Albuquerque maintaining his lead over Nick Tandy with Jack Hawksworth leading the five-car GTD Pro field and Marco Sørensen led GTD. The No. 31 Whelen Engineering Racing Cadillac V-Series.R of Alexander Sims pitted at the end of lap 7. The No. 31 Cadillac was refueled and Pipo Derani took over from Sims. With 78 minutes and 39 seconds remaining, The No. 70 Inception Racing McLaren of Brendan Iribe made contact with the No. 97 Turner Motorsport BMW of Chandler Hull at turn eleven. 6 minutes later, Hull spun Iribe at the same corner and blocked the track for several cars. Hull was issued a drive-through penalty for incident responsibility.

Majority of the field made their first scheduled pit stops for fuel, tires, and driver changes. Sellers overtook De Angelis in the pit cycle to take the lead of GTD after the No. 1 Paul Miller Racing BMW pitted one lap after the No. 27 Aston Martin. Sellers held off De Angelis on his out lap and kept the GTD lead. The No. 10 Acura had a slow pit stop after Ricky Taylor selected neutral on the car's steering wheel causing the car to not launch. Taylor eventually got the clutch engaged and rejoined the race. Mathieu Jaminet, Matt Campbell, Pipo Derani, and Connor De Phillippi jumped Taylor in the pit cycle.

Derani passed Campbell for second at turn six with 49 minutes and 42 seconds remaining. Jordan Taylor passed Klaus Bachler for second in GTD Pro at the same corner 8 minutes later. The No. 31 Cadillac of Pipo Derani pitted on lap 52 and dropped to sixth in the GTP class. De Phillippi attempted to pass Campbell at turn six on lap 59, but missed his braking point and went into the runoff area. De Phillippi spun his car around in the runoff area and Ricky Taylor was promoted to third place while De Phillippi rejoined in fourth. The No. 60 Acura of Colin Braun received a drive-through penalty for speeding in the pits.

On lap 60, the No. 25 BMW M Hybrid V8 of Connor De Phillippi set the overall fastest lap of the race, a 1:11.503. Ricky Taylor caught Jaminet on lap 62 and passed Campbell at turn 6, but was quickly overtaken by Campbell. The No. 10 Acura touched the rear of the No. 7 Porsche on seaside way one lap later and the Porsche lost its left-rear wing endplate. On the next lap, Taylor went around the outside at turn six to try overtaking Campbell for second overall. Campbell blocked Taylor from overtaking him for second position. Ricky Taylor went wide at turn eight on lap 67 was caught by De Phillippi's BMW. 3 laps later, Taylor passed Campbell for second position at turn eight while De Phillippi overtook Campbell for third position shortly afterwards.

Going into turn one on the penultimate lap, Ricky Taylor dived down the inside of Mathieu Jaminet and out braked Jaminet going into turn one. However, Taylor carried too much speed and went into the tire barrier. A full course caution was displayed soon after and the race ended behind the safety car. Jaminet inherited the overall lead and took the first win of the season for the No. 6 Porsche. De Phillippi finished second in the No. 25 BMW, and Campbell completed the podium positions by finishing third. The No. 14 Vasser Sullivan Racing Lexus of Barnicoat and Hawksworth secured victory in GTD Pro, ahead of the No. 3 Corvette of Antonio García and Jordan Taylor, and third-position finishers Klaus Bachler and Patrick Pilet of Pfaff Motorsports. Bryan Sellers and Madison Snow took their second win of the season in GTD. The No. 27 Heart of Racing Team entry of Roman De Angelis and Marco Sørensen finished second, and Frankie Montecalvo and Aaron Telitz in the No. 12 Vasser Sullivan Racing entry rounded out the podium.

=== Post-race ===
Ricky Taylor expressed his disappointment after crashing out on the penultimate lap: "I’m very sorry for Acura, HPD and the WTRAndretti team. With the [previous] Acura ARX-05, this was always the track where we had the most performance deficit to the field. It just says so much about Acura, HPD, ORECA and Wayne Taylor Racing with Andretti Autosport to turn our weakest track into our strongest track [with the new Acura ARX-06]. Unfortunately, we got behind with a little issue mid race, but we had such a strong car while fighting back. It came down so close in the end, if we had more time maybe I would have been more patient, but we just wanted to win this for Acura. Everyone at Acura, HPD and Wayne Taylor Racing with Andretti Autosport deserved to win this today and it’s just disappointing, but I’m just so proud to drive an Acura and be part of this team." Jaminet admitted he saw Taylor's overtake attempt happening: "I kind of saw it coming. He had fresher tires and I got held up in traffic the lap before. It was two to go and he went for us. I braked very late and I just saw he was going and if he could make it stop I’d be impressed."

Hawksworth described the No. 14 Lexus victory in GTD Pro as a "perfect weekend": "One of the best-executed races we’ve been a part of. It was good to clear Sorensen off the start, and that put our Lexus RC F GT3 up at the front. Had an amazing pit stop and then Ben drove his tail off from there."

De Angelis admitted the No. 27 Aston Martin couldn't keep pace with the GTD class winning No. 1 BMW: "We just didn’t have the pace of the BMW. We are looking long term and want to win the championship. I’m still disappointed we didn’t win the race today, but we still have to be happy for good points."

As a result of winning the race, Tandy and Jaminet advanced from fifth to first in the GTP Drivers' Championship. In GTD Pro, Barnicoat and Hawksworth moved to first after being second coming into Long Beach. In the GTD Drivers' Championship, De Angelis and Sørensen advanced from fifth to second while Iribe and Millroy dropped from first to fourth. Additionally, Foley and Gallagher jumped from eighth to fifth. Cadillac continued to top their respective Manufacturers' Championship while Lexus took the lead of the GTD Pro Manufacturers' Championship while BMW took the lead of the GTD Manufacturers' Championship. Porsche Penske Motorsport, Vasser Sullivan Racing, and Paul Miller Racing took the lead in the trio of Teams' Championships with eight races left in the season.

=== Race results ===
Class winners are denoted in bold and ‡.

Pos	Class	No.	Team	Drivers	Chassis	Laps	Time/Retired
Pos	Class	No.	Team	Drivers	Engine	Laps	Time/Retired
1	**GTP**	**6**	**(Germany) Porsche Penske Motorsport**	**(France) Mathieu Jaminet (United Kingdom) Nick Tandy**	**Porsche 963**	**78**	**1:42:08.126‡**
1	**GTP**	**6**	**(Germany) Porsche Penske Motorsport**	**(France) Mathieu Jaminet (United Kingdom) Nick Tandy**	**Porsche 9RD 4.6 L Turbo V8**	**78**	**1:42:08.126‡**
2	GTP	25	(United States) BMW M Team RLL	(United States) Connor De Phillippi (United Kingdom) Nick Yelloly	BMW M Hybrid V8	78	+0.903
2	GTP	25	(United States) BMW M Team RLL	(United States) Connor De Phillippi (United Kingdom) Nick Yelloly	BMW P66/3 4.0 L Turbo V8	78	+0.903
3	GTP	7	(Germany) Porsche Penske Motorsport	(Australia) Matt Campbell (Brazil) Felipe Nasr	Porsche 963	78	+2.904
3	GTP	7	(Germany) Porsche Penske Motorsport	(Australia) Matt Campbell (Brazil) Felipe Nasr	Porsche 9RD 4.6 L Turbo V8	78	+2.904
4	GTP	24	(United States) BMW M Team RLL	(Austria) Philipp Eng (Brazil) Augusto Farfus	BMW M Hybrid V8	78	+3.692
4	GTP	24	(United States) BMW M Team RLL	(Austria) Philipp Eng (Brazil) Augusto Farfus	BMW P66/3 4.0 L Turbo V8	78	+3.692
5	GTP	31	(United States) Whelen Engineering Racing	(Brazil) Pipo Derani (United Kingdom) Alexander Sims	Cadillac V-Series.R	78	+56.151
5	GTP	31	(United States) Whelen Engineering Racing	(Brazil) Pipo Derani (United Kingdom) Alexander Sims	Cadillac LMC55R 5.5 L V8	78	+56.151
6	GTP	60	(United States) Meyer Shank Racing with Curb-Agajanian	(United Kingdom) Tom Blomqvist (United States) Colin Braun	Acura ARX-06	77	+1 lap
6	GTP	60	(United States) Meyer Shank Racing with Curb-Agajanian	(United Kingdom) Tom Blomqvist (United States) Colin Braun	Acura AR24e 2.4 L Turbo V6	77	+1 lap
7 DNF	GTP	10	(United States) Wayne Taylor Racing with Andretti Autosport	(United States) Ricky Taylor (Portugal) Filipe Albuquerque	Acura ARX-06	76	Accident
7 DNF	GTP	10	(United States) Wayne Taylor Racing with Andretti Autosport	(United States) Ricky Taylor (Portugal) Filipe Albuquerque	Acura AR24e 2.4 L Turbo V6	76	Accident
8	**GTD Pro**	**14**	**(United States) Vasser Sullivan Racing**	**(United Kingdom) Ben Barnicoat (United Kingdom) Jack Hawksworth**	**Lexus RC F GT3**	**73**	**+5 Laps‡**
8	**GTD Pro**	**14**	**(United States) Vasser Sullivan Racing**	**(United Kingdom) Ben Barnicoat (United Kingdom) Jack Hawksworth**	**Toyota 2UR 5.0 L V8**	**73**	**+5 Laps‡**
9	GTD Pro	3	(United States) Corvette Racing	(Spain) Antonio García (United States) Jordan Taylor	Chevrolet Corvette C8.R GTD	73	+5 Laps
9	GTD Pro	3	(United States) Corvette Racing	(Spain) Antonio García (United States) Jordan Taylor	Chevrolet 5.5L V8	73	+5 Laps
10	GTD Pro	9	(Canada) Pfaff Motorsports	(Austria) Klaus Bachler (France) Patrick Pilet	Porsche 911 GT3 R (992)	73	+5 Laps
10	GTD Pro	9	(Canada) Pfaff Motorsports	(Austria) Klaus Bachler (France) Patrick Pilet	Porsche 4.2 L Flat-6	73	+5 Laps
11	**GTD**	**1**	**(United States) Paul Miller Racing**	**(United States) Bryan Sellers (United States) Madison Snow**	**BMW M4 GT3**	**73**	**+5 Laps‡**
11	**GTD**	**1**	**(United States) Paul Miller Racing**	**(United States) Bryan Sellers (United States) Madison Snow**	**BMW SS58B30T0 3.0 L Turbo I6**	**73**	**+5 Laps‡**
12	GTD	27	(United States) Heart of Racing Team	(Canada) Roman De Angelis (Denmark) Marco Sørensen	Aston Martin Vantage AMR GT3	73	+5 Laps
12	GTD	27	(United States) Heart of Racing Team	(Canada) Roman De Angelis (Denmark) Marco Sørensen	Aston Martin 4.0 L Turbo V8	73	+5 Laps
13	GTD Pro	23	(United States) Heart of Racing Team	(United Kingdom) Ross Gunn (Spain) Alex Riberas	Aston Martin Vantage AMR GT3	73	+5 Laps
13	GTD Pro	23	(United States) Heart of Racing Team	(United Kingdom) Ross Gunn (Spain) Alex Riberas	Aston Martin 4.0 L Turbo V8	73	+5 Laps
14	GTD	12	(United States) Vasser Sullivan Racing	(United States) Frankie Montecalvo (United States) Aaron Telitz	Lexus RC F GT3	73	+5 Laps
14	GTD	12	(United States) Vasser Sullivan Racing	(United States) Frankie Montecalvo (United States) Aaron Telitz	Toyota 2UR 5.0 L V8	73	+5 Laps
15	GTD	32	(United States) Team Korthoff Motorsports	(Canada) Mikaël Grenier (United States) Mike Skeen	Mercedes-AMG GT3 Evo	72	+6 Laps
15	GTD	32	(United States) Team Korthoff Motorsports	(Canada) Mikaël Grenier (United States) Mike Skeen	Mercedes-AMG M159 6.2 L V8	72	+6 Laps
16	GTD	57	(United States) Winward Racing	(United Kingdom) Philip Ellis (United States) Russell Ward	Mercedes-AMG GT3 Evo	72	+6 Laps
16	GTD	57	(United States) Winward Racing	(United Kingdom) Philip Ellis (United States) Russell Ward	Mercedes-AMG M159 6.2 L V8	72	+6 Laps
17	GTD	70	(United Kingdom) Inception Racing	(United States) Brendan Iribe (Denmark) Frederik Schandorff	McLaren 720S GT3 Evo	72	+6 Laps
17	GTD	70	(United Kingdom) Inception Racing	(United States) Brendan Iribe (Denmark) Frederik Schandorff	McLaren M840T 4.0 L Turbo V8	72	+6 Laps
18	GTD	78	(United States) Forte Racing Powered by US RaceTronics	(Canada) Misha Goikhberg (Italy) Loris Spinelli	Lamborghini Huracán GT3 Evo 2	72	+6 Laps
18	GTD	78	(United States) Forte Racing Powered by US RaceTronics	(Canada) Misha Goikhberg (Italy) Loris Spinelli	Lamborghini 5.2 L V10	72	+6 Laps
19	GTD	96	(United States) Turner Motorsport	(United States) Robby Foley (United States) Patrick Gallagher	BMW M4 GT3	72	+6 Laps
19	GTD	96	(United States) Turner Motorsport	(United States) Robby Foley (United States) Patrick Gallagher	BMW SS58B30T0 3.0 L Turbo I6	72	+6 Laps
20	GTD	66	(United States) Gradient Racing	(United Kingdom) Katherine Legge (United States) Sheena Monk	Acura NSX GT3 Evo22	72	+6 Laps
20	GTD	66	(United States) Gradient Racing	(United Kingdom) Katherine Legge (United States) Sheena Monk	Acura 3.5 L Turbo V6	72	+6 Laps
21	GTD	77	(United States) Wright Motorsports	(United States) Alan Brynjolfsson (United States) Trent Hindman	Porsche 911 GT3 R (992)	72	+6 Laps
21	GTD	77	(United States) Wright Motorsports	(United States) Alan Brynjolfsson (United States) Trent Hindman	Porsche 4.2 L Flat-6	72	+6 Laps
22	GTD Pro	79	(United States) WeatherTech Racing	(Andorra) Jules Gounon (Spain) Daniel Juncadella	Mercedes-AMG GT3 Evo	72	+6 Laps
22	GTD Pro	79	(United States) WeatherTech Racing	(Andorra) Jules Gounon (Spain) Daniel Juncadella	Mercedes-AMG M159 6.2 L V8	72	+6 Laps
23	GTD	97	(United States) Turner Motorsport	(United States) Bill Auberlen (United States) Chandler Hull	BMW M4 GT3	72	+6 Laps
23	GTD	97	(United States) Turner Motorsport	(United States) Bill Auberlen (United States) Chandler Hull	BMW SS58B30T0 3.0 L Turbo I6	72	+6 Laps
24	GTD	91	(United States) Kelly-Moss w/ Riley	(United States) Alan Metni (Netherlands) Kay van Berlo	Porsche 911 GT3 R (992)	71	+7 Laps
24	GTD	91	(United States) Kelly-Moss w/ Riley	(United States) Alan Metni (Netherlands) Kay van Berlo	Porsche 4.2 L Flat-6	71	+7 Laps
25	GTD	92	(United States) Kelly-Moss w/ Riley	(United States) Alec Udell (Netherlands) Jeroen Bleekemolen	Porsche 911 GT3 R (992)	71	+7 Laps
25	GTD	92	(United States) Kelly-Moss w/ Riley	(United States) Alec Udell (Netherlands) Jeroen Bleekemolen	Porsche 4.2 L Flat-6	71	+7 Laps
26 DNF	GTP	01	(United States) Cadillac Racing	(France) Sébastien Bourdais (Netherlands) Renger van der Zande	Cadillac V-Series.R	0	Accident
26 DNF	GTP	01	(United States) Cadillac Racing	(France) Sébastien Bourdais (Netherlands) Renger van der Zande	Cadillac LMC55R 5.5 L V8	0	Accident
WD	GTD	80	(United States) AO Racing Team	(United States) P. J. Hyett (United Kingdom) Sebastian Priaulx	Porsche 911 GT3 R (992)	--	Did not start (Note: The #80 AO Racing Team entry did not make the start due to sustaining too much damage in an accident in qualifying.)
WD	GTD	80	(United States) AO Racing Team	(United States) P. J. Hyett (United Kingdom) Sebastian Priaulx	Porsche 4.2 L Flat-6	--	Did not start
WD	GTD	93	(United States) Racers Edge Motorsports with WTR	(United States) Ashton Harrison (Germany) Mario Farnbacher	Acura NSX GT3 Evo22	--	Did not start (Note: The #93 Racers Edge Motorsports with WTR entry did not make the start due to sustaining too much damage in an accident in qualifying.)
WD	GTD	93	(United States) Racers Edge Motorsports with WTR	(United States) Ashton Harrison (Germany) Mario Farnbacher	Acura 3.5 L Turbo V6	--	Did not start

== Standings after the race ==
GTP Drivers' Championship standings
Pos.	+/–	Driver	Points
1	4	(United Kingdom) Nick Tandy (France) Mathieu Jaminet	955
2	1	(Brazil) Pipo Derani (United Kingdom) Alexander Sims	954
3	1	(Portugal) Filipe Albuquerque (United States) Ricky Taylor	934
4		(United States) Connor De Phillippi (United Kingdom) Nick Yelloly	879
5	1	(Australia) Matt Campbell (Brazil) Felipe Nasr	860

LMP2 Drivers' Championship standings
Pos.	+/–	Driver	Points
1		(Canada) John Farano (New Zealand) Scott McLaughlin (Barbados) Kyffin Simpson	375
2		(United States) Scott Huffaker (Denmark) Mikkel Jensen (United States) Steven Thomas	350
3		(United Kingdom) Ryan Dalziel (United States) Dwight Merriman (Denmark) Christian Rasmussen	323
4		(France) Paul-Loup Chatin (United States) Ben Keating (United Kingdom) Alex Quinn	315
5		(United Kingdom) Ben Hanley (United States) George Kurtz	288

LMP3 Drivers' Championship standings
Pos.	+/–	Driver	Points
1		(Australia) Josh Burdon (Brazil) Felipe Fraga (United States) Gar Robinson	380
2		(United Kingdom) Matt Bell (Canada) Orey Fidani (Germany) Lars Kern	344
3		(United Kingdom) Till Bechtolsheimer (Netherlands) Tijmen van der Helm	332
4		(United States) Daniel Goldburg	332
5		(United Kingdom) Wayne Boyd (Canada) Anthony Mantella (Argentina) Nicolás Varrone	306

GTD Pro Drivers' Championship standings
Pos.	+/–	Driver	Points
1	1	(United Kingdom) Ben Barnicoat (United Kingdom) Jack Hawksworth	1067
2	1	(Andorra) Jules Gounon (Spain) Daniel Juncadella	994
3	1	(Spain) Antonio García (United States) Jordan Taylor	991
4	1	(Austria) Klaus Bachler (France) Patrick Pilet	989
5	1	(United Kingdom) Ross Gunn (Spain) Alex Riberas	844

GTD Drivers' Championship standings
Pos.	+/–	Driver	Points
1	1	(United States) Bryan Sellers (United States) Madison Snow	1008
2	3	(Canada) Roman De Angelis (Denmark) Marco Sørensen	909
3	1	(United States) Frankie Montecalvo (United States) Aaron Telitz	908
4	3	(United States) Brendan Iribe (United Kingdom) Ollie Millroy	901
5	3	(United States) Robby Foley (United States) Patrick Gallagher	759

- Note: Only the top five positions are included for all sets of standings.

GTP Teams' Championship standings
Pos.	+/–	Team	Points
1	4	(Germany) #6 Porsche Penske Motorsport	955
2	1	(United States) #31 Whelen Engineering Racing	954
3	1	(United States) #10 WTR with Andretti Autosport	935
4		(United States) #25 BMW M Team RLL	934
5	1	(Germany) #7 Porsche Penske Motorsport	879

LMP2 Teams' Championship standings
Pos.	+/–	Team	Points
1		(United States) #8 Tower Motorsports	375
2		(France) #11 TDS Racing	350
3		(United States) #18 Era Motorsport	323
4		(United States) #52 PR1/Mathiasen Motorsports	315
5		(United States) #04 CrowdStrike Racing by APR	260

LMP3 Teams' Championship standings
Pos.	+/–	Team	Points
1		(United States) #74 Riley Motorsports	380
2		(Canada) #13 AWA	344
3		(United States) #85 JDC-Miller MotorSports	332
4		(Canada) #17 AWA	306
5		(United States) #4 Ave Motorsports	282

GTD Pro Teams' Championship standings
Pos.	+/–	Team	Points
1	1	(United States) #14 Vasser Sullivan Racing	1067
2	1	(United States) #79 WeatherTech Racing	994
3	1	(United States) #3 Corvette Racing	991
4	1	(Canada) #9 Pfaff Motorsports	989
5	1	(United States) #23 Heart of Racing Team	844

GTD Teams' Championship standings
Pos.	+/–	Team	Points
1	1	(United States) #1 Paul Miller Racing	1008
2	3	(United States) #27 Heart of Racing Team	909
3	1	(United States) #12 Vasser Sullivan Racing	908
4	3	(United Kingdom) #70 Inception Racing	901
5	3	(United States) #96 Turner Motorsport	759

- Note: Only the top five positions are included for all sets of standings.

GTP Manufacturers' Championship standings
Pos.	+/–	Manufacturer	Points
1		(United States) Cadillac	1067
2	1	(Germany) BMW	1026
3	1	(Germany) Porsche	1020
4	2	(Japan) Acura	1012

GTD Pro Manufacturers' Championship standings
Pos.	+/–	Manufacturer	Points
1	1	(Japan) Lexus	1067
2	1	(Germany) Mercedes-AMG	994
3	1	(United States) Chevrolet	991
4	1	(Germany) Porsche	989
5	1	(United Kingdom) Aston Martin	854

GTD Manufacturers' Championship standings
Pos.	+/–	Manufacturer	Points
1	2	(Germany) BMW	1030
2		(United Kingdom) Aston Martin	1016
3	2	(United Kingdom) McLaren	959
4		(Japan) Lexus	950
5		(Germany) Porsche	866

- Note: Only the top five positions are included for all sets of standings.

IMSA SportsCar Championship
Previous race: 2023 12 Hours of Sebring	2023 season	Next race: 2023 Motul Course de Monterey
