= Virginia International Raceway =

Motorsport track in the United States

- Full Course (1957–1974, 2000–present)
- Location: Alton, Virginia, United States
- Coordinates: 36°33′42″N 79°12′17″W
- FIA Grade: 2 (Note: Virginia International Raceway's Grade 2 licence expired on 4 July 2025.)
- Opened: 3 August 1957; 69 years ago Re-opened: March 2000; 26 years ago
- Closed: 1974
- Architect: Hooper D. Johnson
- Major events: Current: IMSA SportsCar Championship; Michelin GT Challenge at VIR (1957–1964, 1971–1972, 2002–present); Trans-Am Series (1966, 2002, 2009–2011, 2013–present); MotoAmerica (2001–2010, 2015–2019, 2021–2022, 2025–present); Former: GT World Challenge America (2002, 2008, 2010, 2017–2025); SCCA Runoffs (2019, 2022–2023); NASCAR K&N Pro Series East; Biscuitville 125 (2013–2016)

Full Course (1957–1974, 2000–present)
- Surface: Asphalt
- Length: 3.270 mi (5.262 km)
- Turns: 17
- Race lap record: 1:36.112 ( (Germany) Lucas Luhr, HPD ARX-03a, 2012, LMP1)

Grand East Course (2003–present)
- Length: 4.200 mi (6.759 km)
- Turns: 25

Grand West Course (2003–present)
- Length: 4.100 mi (6.598 km)
- Turns: 28

North Course (2000–present)
- Length: 2.250 mi (3.621 km)
- Turns: 17
- Race lap record: 1:19.843 ( (United States) Kenton Koch, Élan DP02, 2015, Prototype Lites)

South Course (2000–present)
- Length: 1.650 mi (2.655 km)
- Turns: 12

Patriot Course (2003–present)
- Length: 1.100 mi (1.770 km)
- Turns: 12

Virginia International Raceway (VIR) is a race track that is located in Alton, Virginia, which is near Danville. It is less than a half-mile from the North Carolina/Virginia border just outside Milton, North Carolina, as well on the banks of the Dan River. VIR hosts amateur and professional automobile and motorcycle events, driving schools, club days, and private test rentals.

== History ==
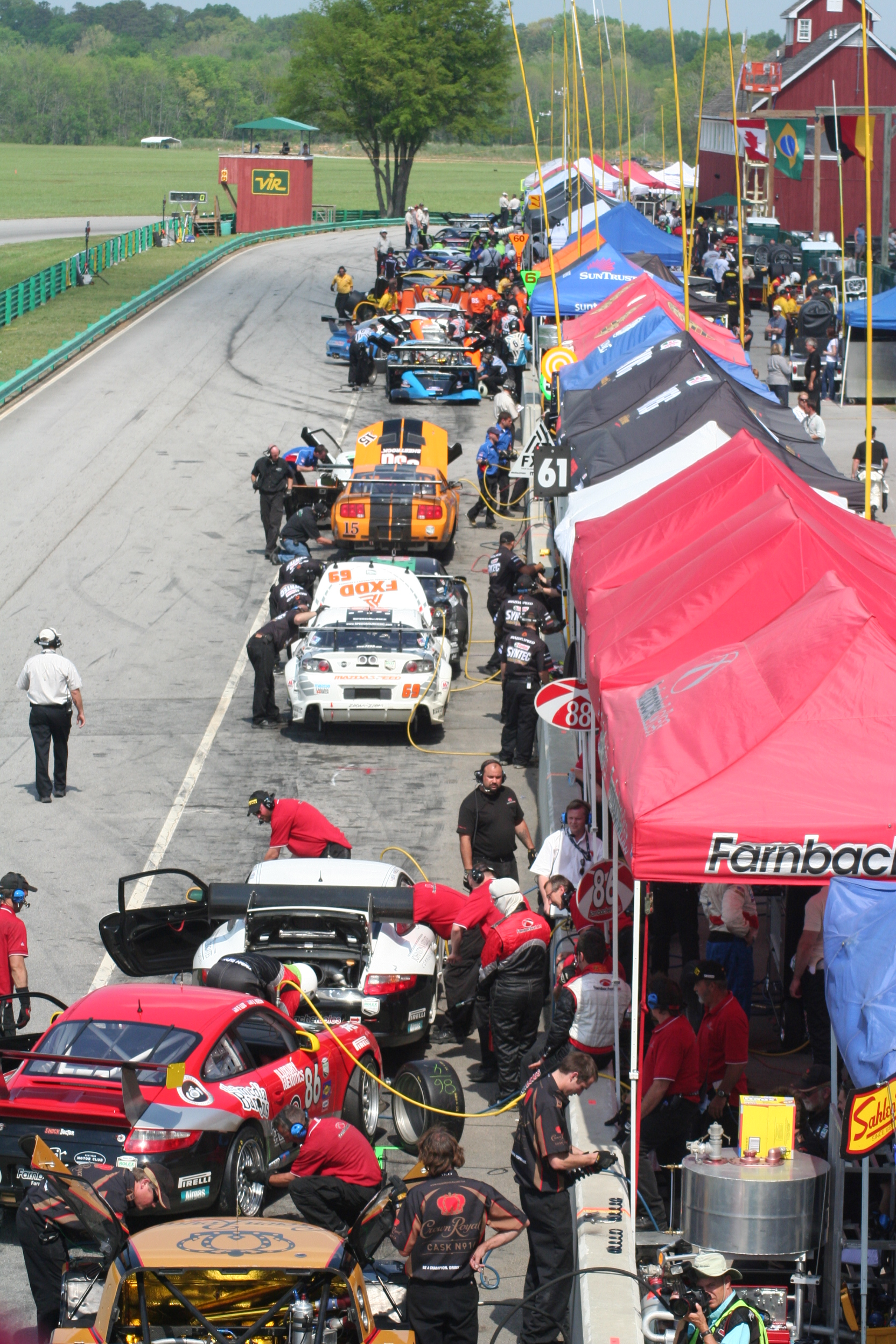
Pit road during 2008 Grand-Am race

The track originally opened August 3, 1957, and was created by a group of men using a bulldozer. The track had been closed from 1974 prior to its reopening in March 2000. The track was reopened in 2000 by New Yorker Harvey Siegel and Connie Nyholm using a "country club" model. Memberships to the track are sold. Each member of the VIR Club receives track time on member days, tickets to all spectator events, and other benefits. VIR's membership model has since been followed by other racetracks across the United States.

There have been at least four deaths in track history, with three fatalities coming since the reopening of the facility. The most recent death was that of 14-year-old Toriano Wilson in a US Rookie Cup motorcycle race in August 2008.

The track hosted the SCCA National Sports Car Championship from its opening in 1957 until the series' demise in 1964. The IMSA GT Championship visited VIR in 1971 and 1972. After its re-opening, the AMA Superbike Championship held races at VIR from 2001 until 2010 on the North Course. The Rolex Sports Car Series utilized the Full Course from 2002 through 2011. The American Le Mans Series used the Full Course configuration for its inaugural event at VIR in September 2012 where a new track record was set by Klaus Graf driving the Muscle Milk LMP1 car.

Driving a Maserati 450S, Carroll Shelby won the feature race on the track’s inaugural weekend in August 1957. The list of other well-known drivers who raced at VIR during its first incarnation includes Briggs Cunningham, Walt Hansgen, Roger Penske, Mark Donohue, Richard Petty, Bob Holbert, Augie Pabst, Curtis Turner, Dick Thompson, Peter Revson, Wendell Scott, Bob Tullius, Janet Guthrie, Skip Barber, Ricky Rudd, Gene Felton, Denise McCluggage, Hurley Haywood, Brock Yates, Don Yenko, Lance Reventlow, Dan Gurney and Parnelli Jones.

The track hosts many events throughout the year, including the annual Gold Cup Historic Race as well as AMA races, ChampCar Endurance Series, SCCA, NASCAR K&N Pro Series East, NASCAR test days, and local car club events. Various driving training classes are available on the paved and unpaved (off-road) courses. The site also hosts a go kart track.

Since 2014, VIR has hosted a GT only race in the IMSA WeatherTech SportsCar Championship.

== Track description ==
VIR offers six track configurations, of which two can be run simultaneously. The "Full Course" is 3.270 mi (5.263 km) in length while the "Patriot Course" stretches for 1.100 mi (1.770 km) entirely inside the Full Course. The "North Course" is 2.250 mi (3.621 km) long and the "South Course" covers a distance of 1.650 mi (2.655 km). Both consist of a portion of the "Full Course" and short connecting sections that connect to portions of the "Patriot Course" to produce the two courses that can run simultaneously. There is a second pit complex that is used only when running the "South Course". The longest configuration, "Grand East Course", is 4.200 mi (6.759 km) long, and combines most of the "Full Course" and most of the "Patriot Course" by means of two of the short sections of connecting track used to make the "South Course" and "North Course". There is also another, seldom run, long configuration called the "Grand West Course" that uses the other two short connecting sections between the "Full Course" and the "Patriot Course." Car and Driver magazine has an annual test of fast cars called "The Lightning Lap" using the "Grand West Course". Since the Patriot course is contained completely inside the Full Course, they can be run simultaneously.

The "Full Course" is the most common configuration. One of the most notable sections of the course, second only to "Oak Tree" (T11), are the "Climbing Esses" which consist of an initial left up-hill (T7), followed by a right which crests at the apex then dropping slightly into a left (T8) which again crests at the apex dropping slightly, and then up into a final right (T9). The complexity and difficulty of this section is multiplied by the incredible entry speed because of a straight section leading into the Climbing Esses. This is followed by a cresting blind left hand turn (T10), "South Bend", that finishes in a steep downward slope. Another signature section is the "Roller Coaster" (T14) which is a scaled-down mirror image to the famed "Corkscrew" at Mazda Raceway Laguna Seca.

There are two main straights on the track. The front straight is approximately 3,000 ft (910 m) long while the back straight is approximately 4,000 ft (1,200 m) long. While the back straight is 33% longer, the front straight is where higher speeds are reached since "Hog Pen" (T17) leads onto it and is a much faster corner than "Oak Tree" (T11), which leads onto the longer back straight. There is 130 ft (40 m) of elevation change throughout the course.

Some of the raceway's other named curves include "Oak Tree", "Horse Shoe", "NASCAR Bend" (because NASCAR drivers Richard Petty, David Pearson and Wendell Scott had difficulties there during a 1966 Trans Am race), "Snake", "Spiral", "Fish Hook", and "The Bitch".

=== Layout configurations ===
Virginia International Circuit layout configurations
Full Course (1957–1974, 2000–present)
3.270 mi (5.263 km) layout with 17 turns

Grand East Course
4.200 mi (6.759 km) layout with 25 turns

Grand West Course
4.100 mi (6.598 km) layout with 28 turns

North Course
2.250 mi (3.621 km) layout with 17 turns

South Course
1.650 mi (2.655 km) layout with 12 turns

Patriot Course
1.100 mi (1.770 km) layout with 12 turns

== Events ==
Current

- April: SCCA Super Tour VIR Spring Sprints
- June: IMSA VP Racing SportsCar Challenge, Porsche Sprint Challenge North America
- July: GT World Challenge America, GT4 America Series, TC America Series, Toyota Gazoo Racing Cup North America
- August: IMSA SportsCar Championship Michelin GT Challenge at VIR, MotoAmerica MotoAmerica Superbikes at Virginia, Michelin Pilot Challenge Virginia Is Racing for Lovers Grand Prix, IMSA VP Racing SportsCar Challenge, Global MX-5 Cup, Mustang Challenge North America, ChampCar Endurance Series
- September: Trans-Am Series VIR SpeedTour, Formula Regional Americas Championship, Formula 4 United States Championship, Sportscar Vintage Racing Association
- December: ChampCar Endurance Series

Future

- McLaren Trophy America (2025, 2027)

Former

- American Le Mans Series
  - Oak Tree Grand Prix (2012–2013)
- Atlantic Championship Series (2014–2019)
- F1600 Championship Series (2014–2019)
- F2000 Championship Series (2014–2019)
- Ferrari Challenge North America (2007, 2021)
- Formula BMW Americas (2009)
- Formula Lites (2015)
- GT America Series (2021–2025)
- GT World Challenge America (2002, 2008, 2010, 2017–2025)
- GT4 America Series (2019–2025)
- IMSA GT Championship (1971–1972)
- IMSA GT3 Cup Challenge (2012, 2015–2020)
- IMSA Prototype Challenge (2012, 2014–2015, 2018–2022)
- Lamborghini Super Trofeo North America (2013–2023)
- NASCAR K&N Pro Series East
  - Biscuitville 125 (2013–2016)
- Porsche Carrera Cup North America (2021)
- Radical Cup World Finals (2025)
- Rolex Sports Car Series
  - Bosch Engineering 250 at VIR (2002–2011)
- SCCA National Championship Runoffs (2019, 2022–2023)
- SCCA National Sports Car Championship (1957–1964)
- TC America Series (2019–2025)
- Star Mazda Championship (2007, 2009)
- USF2000 Championship (2012)
- USF Juniors (2022–2024)

== Lap records ==
As of August 2026, the fastest official race lap records at Virginia International Raceway (VIR) are listed as:

Category	Time	Driver	Vehicle	Event
Full Grand Prix Road Course (1957–1974, 2000–present): 3.270 mi (5.262 km)
LMP1	1:36.112	Lucas Luhr	HPD ARX-03a	2012 American Le Mans Series VIR 240
LMP2	1:39.393	Martin Plowman	Morgan LMP2	2012 American Le Mans Series VIR 240
LMP900	1:39.618	Didier Theys	Dallara SP1	2002 VIR 500
LM GTE	1:40.638	Earl Bamber	Porsche 911 RSR	2019 Oak Tree Grand Prix
LMP3	1:40.735	Garett Grist	Ligier JS P320	2021 Virginia IMSA Prototype Challenge round
LMPC	1:41.608	Colin Braun	Oreca FLM09	2014 Oak Tree Grand Prix
Formula Atlantic	1:41.817	David Grant	Swift 016.a	2017 Virginia Atlantic Championship round
DP	1:42.878	Max Angelelli	Dallara DP01	2009 Bosch Engineering 250 at VIR
TA1	1:43.502	Connor Zilisch	Chevrolet Camaro Trans-Am	2023 Virginia Trans-Am round
Lamborghini Super Trofeo	1:43.715	Sandy Mitchell	Lamborghini Huracán Super Trofeo Evo	2019 Virginia Lamborghini Super Trofeo North America round
Formula Regional	1:44.015	Mathias Soler-Obel	Ligier JS F3	2019 Virginia F3 Americas round
GT3	1:44.150	Loris Spinelli	Mercedes-AMG GT3 Evo	2022 Virginia GT World Challenge America round
LMP675	1:45.289	Terry Borcheller	Lola B2K/40	2002 VIR 500
Porsche Carrera Cup	1:46.726	Sebastian Priaulx	Porsche 911 (992 I) GT3 Cup	2021 Virginia Porsche Carrera Cup North America round
Star Mazda	1:46.998	Adam Christodoulou	Star Formula Mazda 'Pro'	2009 Virginia Star Mazda round
Radical Cup	1:47.044	Scott Wagner	Radical SR10 XXR	2025 Radical World Finals
Ferrari Challenge	1:49.615	Cooper MacNeil	Ferrari 488 Challenge Evo	2021 Virginia Ferrari Challenge North America round
Stock car racing	1:49.931	Joe Nemechek	Toyota Camry	2024 Virginia NASCAR Classic round
TA2	1:49.934	Connor Zilisch	Chevrolet Camaro Trans-Am	2023 Virginia Trans-Am round
McLaren Trophy	1:50.060	Tommy Pintos	McLaren Artura Trophy	2025 Virginia McLaren Trophy America round
US F2000	1:50.298	Spencer Pigot	Van Diemen DP08	2012 Virginia USF2000 round
GT1 (GTS)	1:50.943	Ken Wilden	Chevrolet Corvette C5-R	2003 VIR 400
F2000 Championship	1:51.651	Sam Beasley	Van Diemen F2000	2014 Virginia F2000 Championship round
SRO GT2	1:51.706	C.J. Moses	Audi R8 LMS GT2	2022 Virginia GT America round
American GT	1:52.502	Tommy Riggins	Ford Mustang	2002 VIR 500
GT4	1:52.740	Ross Gunn	Aston Martin AMR Vantage GT4	2019 Virginia Is For Racing Lovers Grand Prix
Formula 4	1:52.860	Cooper Shipman	Ligier JS F422	2025 Virginia F4 United States round
GT	1:53.375	João Barbosa	Mosler MT900R	2002 VIR 500
TCR Touring Car	1:54.604	Michael James Lewis	Hyundai i30 N TCR	2018 Grand Prix of Virginia presented by Audi Sport
USF Juniors	1:54.619	Jack Jeffers	Tatuus JR-23	2023 Cooper Tires VIR Grand Prix
Mustang Challenge	1:56.096	Robert Noaker	Ford Mustang Dark Horse R	2025 Virginia Mustang Challenge round
Formula BMW	1:56.217	Giancarlo Vilarinho	Mygale FB02	2009 Virginia Formula BMW Americas round
F1600 Championship	1:57.422	Ayla Ågren	Mygale SJ 2012	2014 Virginia F1600 Championship round
Mazda MX-5 Cup	2:06.481	Jared Thomas	Mazda MX-5 (ND)	2024 Virginia Mazda MX-5 Cup round
Toyota GR Cup	2:06.728	Lucas Weisenberg	Toyota GR86	2023 Virginia Toyota GR Cup North America round
Group 7	2:08.400	Bob Nagel	McKee Mk.7	1968 SCCA National Championship Races
Group 3	2:14.400	Ed Lowther (Note: Both drivers took the same lap time independently.); Bob Grossman	Shelby Cobra 427	1967 SCCA Northeast Division National Championship Sports Car Races
North Course (2000–present): 2.250 mi (3.621 km)
Prototype Lites	1:19.843	Kenton Koch	Élan DP02	2015 Virginia IMSA Prototype Lites round
Formula Lites	1:23.514	Vinicius Papareli	Crawford FL15	2015 Virginia Formula Lites round
Superbike	1:23.834	Jake Gagne	Yamaha YZF-R1	2021 Virginia MotoAmerica Superbike round
Supersport	1:26.094	P. J. Jacobsen	Ducati Panigale V2	2025 Virginia MotoAmerica Supersport round
Twins Cup	1:29.674	Hank Vossberg	Aprilia RS660	2026 Virginia MotoAmerica Twins round
Supersport 300	1:36.493	Alex Dumas	KTM RC 390 R	2018 Virginia MotoAmerica Junior Cup round

== Testing ==
The track is frequently used for test sessions by NASCAR teams. The teams use the road course to test their road course cars for the Watkins Glen International and Sonoma Raceway races. Since the track is not currently active on the principal NASCAR circuit (Trucks, Xfinity and Cup), a practice session is not charged against their allotment.

The track is also used by various manufacturers in testing of new or updated vehicles.

== Celebrities at VIR ==
Several celebrities have visited VIR. In 2010, part of a special episode of the British television show Top Gear was filmed at the raceway and aired later that year as a part of season 16.

Country music superstar Reba McEntire visited the raceway in 2012 when her son took part in the race.

In early October 2013 actor Patrick Dempsey, a star of Grey's Anatomy, and former athlete and reality-TV star Caitlyn Jenner raced at the track.

== Video games and simulators ==
All six configurations are featured in racing simulators Automobilista and rFactor 2.

VIR is featured in Forza Motorsport 6 as part of the Porsche Expansion Pack released on March 1, 2016. The track is featured with all six of its layouts, as well as daytime, nighttime, dry, and wet conditions. It is also featured in Forza Motorsport 7, released in October 2017.

It is also in the game iRacing as part of the base content. It only has 5 layouts, lacking the Grand East Course layout.

VIR's North Course is featured in the video games Supercar Challenge and Ferrari Challenge Trofeo Pirelli.

All layouts of VIR were scratch built as a mod for Kunos Simulazioni's racing simulation Assetto Corsa.

== See also ==
- 944 Cup
- ChampCar Endurance Series
