= McLaren Trophy America =

Sports car racing series based in the United States

- Category: Sports car racing
- Country: United States
- Inaugural season: 2025
- Engine suppliers: Pirelli
- Makes' champion: McLaren
- Official website: https://mclarentrophyamerica.com/

The McLaren Trophy America is a sports car racing series based in the United States, established in 2025. It is managed and promoted by SRO Motorsports Group and sanctioned by the United States Auto Club.

== History ==
Following the success of the McLaren Trophy Europe, the inaugural season for its American counterpart was announced on July 1, 2024, with ten races at five circuits, all supporting the 2025 GT World Challenge America season. Eligible cars are the McLaren Artura Trophy and the McLaren 570S Trophy.

== Format ==
The race weekend consists of two, 15-minute qualifying sessions and two, 50-minute races with a mandatory pit-stop for a driver change.

There are three classes in the championship divided by FIA Driver Categorisation. The Pro class consists of a pair of Silver graded drivers, while Pro-Am has one Bronze and one Silver, Gold or Platinum sharing the car. The final class is the Am category where only Bronze can compete either solo or with another Bronze driver.

A subcategory for drivers over a certain age or with limited experience are eligible for the Papaya Cup. Am drivers over the age of 60 and Am drivers younger than 60 based on their previous levels of experience compete amongst one another for specially commissioned Papaya Cup medals. The top Papaya Cup Pro-Am and Am drivers are recognized at the McLaren Trophy championship awards at the McLaren Technology Centre in Woking, England.

The top ten finishers in each class score points for their respective category. The scoring system for both drivers' and teams' championship is as follows: 15-12-10-8-6-5-4-3-2-1.

== Champions ==
=== Drivers' ===
Year	Pro	Pro-Am	Am
2025	(United States) Casey Dennis (United States) James Li	(United States) Alexandra Hainer (Canada) Jesse Lazare	(United States) James Sofronas

=== Teams' ===
Year	Entrant
2025	(United States) GMG Racing

== Circuits ==
- (California) Sonoma Raceway (2025–2026)
- (Texas) Circuit of the Americas (2025, 2027)
- Virginia International Raceway (2025, 2027)
- (Wisconsin) Road America (2025–2026)
- (Indiana) Indianapolis Motor Speedway (2025–2026)
- (Florida) Miami International Autodrome (2026)
- (Georgia (U.S. state)) Road Atlanta (2026)
- (Alabama) Barber Motorsports Park (2027)
- (New York (state)) Watkins Glen International (2027)
