= Forte Racing =

American sports car racing team

(United States) Forte Racing
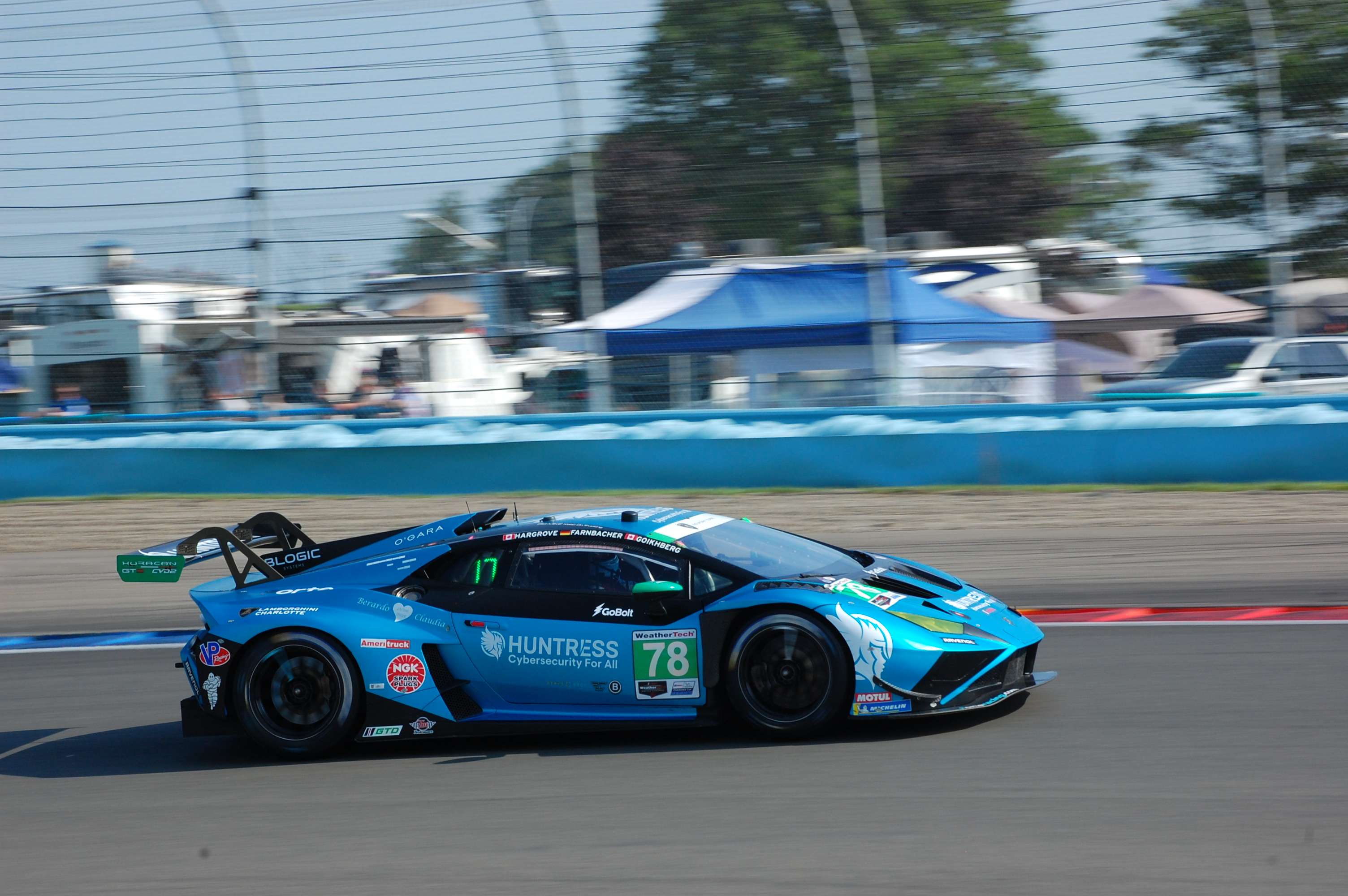
- Founded: 2005
- Founder(s): Shane Seneviratne
- Base: Buttonwillow, California, U.S.
- Current series: IMSA VP Racing SportsCar Challenge; Lamborghini Super Trofeo North America; McLaren Trophy America
- Former series: IMSA SportsCar Championship
- Website: https://forteracing.com

Forte Racing, formerly known as US RaceTronics (USRT), is an American sports car racing team based in Buttonwillow, California, In 2022, USRT merged with O’Gara Motorsports and Change Racing before rebranding into Forte Racing the following year.

== History ==
It was founded by former Dorricott Racing Team Manager Shane Seneviratne. Seneviratne and the Dorricott Racing organization dominated both the Toyota Atlantic and Indy Lights open wheel series. The team won numerous awards and race wins, including series championships in 1999, 2001, and 2002. Dorricott Racing founder Bob Dorricott died of cancer in 2002 and Seneviratne assisted in the liquidation of the team’s assets after the 2003 season.

== Toyota Atlantic Championship ==
=== 2005 ===
At the end of 2004 season, which Seneviratne and Dorricott Racing did not participate in, Seneviratne formed US RaceTronics with the hopes of competing in the 2005 Toyota Atlantic Championship season. Purchasing some of the old Dorricott equipment as well as a Swift 014.a chassis, produced by Swift Engineering, Seneviratne set out to enter the team in the 2005 season opening race at Long Beach. After hiring a skeleton crew the team entered its first official race with driver Roby Feazel. Feazell and US RaceTronics finished the race in 13th. Monterrey, Mexico driver David Martinez signed on to drive for US RaceTronics after the team's Long Beach debut for his home race in Monterrey, Mexico. Martinez and the team finished 3rd for that race. They went on to complete the season together and finished 5th place in the final Championship standings at the year’s end. Martinez had 10 top-10 finishes, 5 of those were top-3 finishes. He also garnered a pole position award at Montreal.

=== 2006 ===
For 2006 the team purchased the new Swift 016.a chassis (2006 was the first year that the Swift 016.a chassis was introduced into the series) and entered their sophomore year with driver David Martinez rejoining the team. Once again Martinez and the team enjoyed success as the 12-race schedule included 10 top-10 finishes, 1 of those was a top-3 finish. Martinez’s race finishing position averaged 6 gained positions.

=== 2007 ===
2007 included the expansion of US RaceTronics from a 1-car team to a 2-car operation. American Carl Skerlong and Mexican driver David Garza joined the team to compete in the 12-race series Champ Car Atlantic Championship Series schedule. In Portland the team announced that it would become the “junior team” for Pacific Coast Motorsports Champ Car team. The new partnership would share resources and capitalize on both west coast racing team operations. As the season concluded Skerlong’s performance was topped off by 4 top-10 race finishes, two of those were top-3 finishes. Garza’s performance included 4 top-10 race finishes. The season concluded with Seneviratne being selected as the Champ Car Atlantic Series Team Owner of the Year for 2007.

=== 2008 ===
The US RaceTronics team was renamed to “Pacific Coast Motorsports powered by US RaceTronics”. The driver makeup of the team changed as well. Skerlong continued with the team, however the team was joined by second year Atlantic series racer Frankie Muniz. Facing the challenge of the collapse of the Champ Car series, the team continued in the Atlantic Series and saw continued success. The team experienced its first win after 45 races when Skerlong won on September 14, 2008 at the New Jersey Motorsports Park’s Thunderbolt Raceway. At the end of the season Skerlong had 7 top-10 finishes, 4 of those were top-3 finishes. Muniz also excelled as he continued his transition from Hollywood actor turned professional race car driver. His results included 4 top-10 finishes. Muniz averaged 2 gained races positions at every race event.

=== 2009 ===
With the partnership with Pacific Coast Motorsports dissolving in 2009, US RaceTronics signed Atlantic Championship series regular Simona de Silvestro and resigned Frankie Muniz to compete in the 2009 season. Imran Safiulla joined the team as Team Principal

De Silvestro participated in an IndyCar Series test on December 8 and 9 at Sebring, a joint effort between HVM Racing and Team Stargate Worlds.
