= 2021 Porsche Carrera Cup North America =

Motor racing competition

Seasons
- ← none 2022 →

The 2021 Porsche Carrera Cup North America was the first Porsche Carrera Cup North America season, sanctioned by the International Motor Sports Association (IMSA) which in turn replaced both Porsche GT3 Cup Challenge USA & Porsche GT3 Cup Challenge Canada. It began on March 19 at Sebring International Raceway and ended on November 12 at Road Atlanta.

== Teams and drivers ==
The following teams and drivers were signed to run the 2021 season.

Team	No.	Driver	Class	Rounds
992 Pro Class
(United States) JDX Racing	2	(United States) Sean McAlister	R	All
(United States) JDX Racing	9	(Canada) Parker Thompson	R	All
(Canada) Kelly-Moss Road and Race	3	(Netherlands) Kay van Berlo	R	All
(Canada) Kelly-Moss Road and Race	15	(Guernsey) Sebastian Priaulx	R	All
(Canada) Kelly-Moss Road and Race	27	(Puerto Rico) Sebastian Carazo	R	All
(United States) / Moorespeed-Wright Motorsports (Note: Car No. 19 entered as Moorespeed-Wright Motorsports and car No. 88 entered as Wright Motorsports.); (United States) / Wright Motorsports	7	(United States) Max Root	R	All
(United States) / Moorespeed-Wright Motorsports; (United States) / Wright Motorsports	88	(United States) Hutton McKenna		All
(United States) 311RS Motorsport	11	(United States) Ryan Gates		All
(United States) 311RS Motorsport	12	(United States) Leh Keen		All
(Germany) MRS GT-Racing	14	(Sweden) Erik Johansson		1–4, 6
(Germany) MRS GT-Racing	14	(Germany) Leon Köhler		7
(Germany) MRS GT-Racing	16	(Canada) Jeffrey Kingsley		1
(Germany) MRS GT-Racing	16	(Dominican Republic) Jimmy Llibre		4
(United States) BGB Motorsports	38	(United States) Dylan Murry	R	All
(New Zealand) Team Hardpoint EBM	53	(United States) Riley Dickinson	R	All
(United States) Topp Racing	58	(United States) TJ Fischer		All
992 Pro-Am Class
(United States) TPC Racing	10	(United States) Vernon McClure		1, 3–6
(Germany) MRS GT-Racing	14	(Hungary) Andor Kovacs		5
(Germany) MRS GT-Racing	16	(United States) Mark Thomas		2
(Germany) MRS GT-Racing	16	(Romania) Alexander Marmureanu		5
(Germany) MRS GT-Racing	16	(United States) Steve Dunn		6–7
(United States) ACI Motorsports	17	(United States) Curt Swearingin		All
(United States) Goldcrest Motorsports	29	(United States) Jeffrey Majkrzak		5–7
(United States) Topp Racing	42	(United States) Bill Smith		All
(United States) Black Swan with JDX Racing	54	(United States) Tim Pappas		1, 4–6
(United States) Wright Motorsports	57	(United States) John Goetz		All
(New Zealand) Team Hardpoint EBM	65	(Dominican Republic) Efrin Castro		All
(United States) BGB Motorsport	69	(Canada) Thomas Collingwood		All
(Canada) / Kelly-Moss Road and Race (Note: Car No. 84 entered as Kelly-Moss Road and Race and car No. 99 entered as iFLY Racing/Kelly-Moss.); (Canada) / iFLY Racing/Kelly-Moss	84	(United States) Rene Robichaud		1, 3, 7
(Canada) / Kelly-Moss Road and Race; (Canada) / iFLY Racing/Kelly-Moss	99	(United States) Alan Metni		All
991 Pro-Am Class
(United States) Goldcrest Motorsports	8	(United States) Joe Still		1–3, 6–7
(United States) Goldcrest Motorsports	21	(United States) Grady Willingham		All
(United States) Goldcrest Motorsports	29	(United States) Jeffrey Majkrzak		1–4
(United States) Goldcrest Motorsports	55	(United States) Matt Halcome		All
(United States) Goldcrest Motorsports	72	(United States) Phillip Martien		1–2
(United States) Goldcrest Motorsports	96	(United States) Dimitri Dimakos		7
(United States) / ACI Motorsports (Note: Cars No. 18 and 24 entered as ACI Motorsports and car No. 64 entered as Teama TGM); (United States) / Team TGM	18	(United States) Richard Edge		3
(United States) / ACI Motorsports; (United States) / Team TGM	24	(United States) Kurt Hunt		1, 3–4, 7
(United States) / ACI Motorsports; (United States) / Team TGM	64	(United States) Ted Giovanis		1
(United States) Topp Racing	56	(United States) Frank Raso		1–2
(Canada) Kelly-Moss Racing	59	(United States) Tom Balames		1, 3–4, 7
(Canada) Kelly-Moss Racing	92	(United States) Joseph Lombardo		1, 3, 5, 7
(United States) Flying Lizard Motorsports	68	(United States) Chris Bellomo		4, 7
(United States) Irish Mike's Racing	95	(United States) Conor Flynn		4–7
(United States) Irish Mike's Racing	97	(United States) Craig Conway		1, 3–7

Icon	Class
R	Rookie
G	Guest

== Race calendar and results ==
The revised calendar was announced on September 25, 2020.

Round	Circuit	Date	Pole position	Fastest lap	Winning driver	Winning team
1	(United States) Sebring International Raceway, Sebring, Florida	March 19	(Guernsey) Sebastian Priaulx	(Netherlands) Kay van Berlo	(Guernsey) Sebastian Priaulx	(Canada) Kelly-Moss Road and Race
2	(United States) Sebring International Raceway, Sebring, Florida	March 20	(Guernsey) Sebastian Priaulx	(Guernsey) Sebastian Priaulx	(Netherlands) Kay van Berlo	(Canada) Kelly-Moss Road and Race
3	(United States) Circuit of The Americas, Austin, Texas	April 30	(Guernsey) Sebastian Priaulx	(Guernsey) Sebastian Priaulx	(Canada) Parker Thompson	(United States) JDX Racing
4	(United States) Circuit of The Americas, Austin, Texas	May 2	(Guernsey) Sebastian Priaulx	(Netherlands) Kay van Berlo	(Netherlands) Kay van Berlo	(Canada) Kelly-Moss Road and Race
5	(United States) Watkins Glen International, Watkins Glen, New York	June 24	(United States) Max Root	(Guernsey) Sebastian Priaulx	(Netherlands) Kay van Berlo	(Canada) Kelly-Moss Road and Race
6	(United States) Watkins Glen International, Watkins Glen, New York	June 27	(Guernsey) Sebastian Priaulx	(Netherlands) Kay van Berlo	(Netherlands) Kay van Berlo	(Canada) Kelly-Moss Road and Race
	(Canada) Honda Indy Toronto, Toronto, Ontario	Cancelled				
7	(United States) Road America, Elkhart Lake, Wisconsin	August 6	(Netherlands) Kay van Berlo	(Netherlands) Kay van Berlo	(Netherlands) Kay van Berlo	(Canada) Kelly-Moss Road and Race
8	(United States) Road America, Elkhart Lake, Wisconsin	August 8	(Netherlands) Kay van Berlo	(United States) Riley Dickinson	(Canada) Parker Thompson	(United States) JDX Racing
9	(United States) Indianapolis Motor Speedway, Indianapolis, Indiana	September 11	(Guernsey) Sebastian Priaulx	(Guernsey) Sebastian Priaulx	(Guernsey) Sebastian Priaulx	(Canada) Kelly-Moss Road and Race
10	(United States) Indianapolis Motor Speedway, Indianapolis, Indiana	September 12	(Guernsey) Sebastian Priaulx	(Canada) Parker Thompson	(Canada) Parker Thompson	(United States) JDX Racing
11	(United States) Indianapolis Motor Speedway, Indianapolis, Indiana	September 12	(Guernsey) Sebastian Priaulx	(Canada) Parker Thompson	(Guernsey) Sebastian Priaulx	(Canada) Kelly-Moss Road and Race
12	(United States) Virginia International Raceway, Alton, Virginia	October 9	(Netherlands) Kay van Berlo	(Guernsey) Sebastian Priaulx	(Netherlands) Kay van Berlo	(Canada) Kelly-Moss Road and Race
13	(United States) Virginia International Raceway, Alton, Virginia	October 10	(Guernsey) Sebastian Priaulx	(Guernsey) Sebastian Priaulx	(Guernsey) Sebastian Priaulx	(Canada) Kelly-Moss Road and Race
14	(United States) Michelin Raceway Road Atlanta, Braselton, Georgia	November 10	(Guernsey) Sebastian Priaulx	(United States) Riley Dickinson	(Guernsey) Sebastian Priaulx	(Canada) Kelly-Moss Road and Race
15	(United States) Michelin Raceway Road Atlanta, Braselton, Georgia	November 11	(Guernsey) Sebastian Priaulx	(United States) Riley Dickinson	(Netherlands) Kay van Berlo	(Canada) Kelly-Moss Road and Race
16	(United States) Michelin Raceway Road Atlanta, Braselton, Georgia	November 12	(Guernsey) Sebastian Priaulx	(Guernsey) Sebastian Priaulx	(Guernsey) Sebastian Priaulx	(Canada) Kelly-Moss Road and Race

== Final standings ==
Pos	Driver	Team	Points
1	(Guernsey) Sebastian Priaulx	(Canada) Kelly-Moss Road and Race	371
2	(Netherlands) Kay van Berlo	(Canada) Kelly-Moss Road and Race	287
3	(Canada) Parker Thompson	(United States) JDX Racing	258
4	(United States) Riley Dickinson	(New Zealand) Team Hardpoint EBM	216
5	(United States) Leh Keen	(United States) 311RS Motorsports	191
6	(United States) TJ Fischer	(United States) Topp Racing	163
7	(United States) Dylan Murry	(United States) BGB Motorsport	123
8	(United States) Max Root	(United States) Wright Motorsports	120
9	(Puerto Rico) Sebastian Carazo	(Canada) Kelly-Moss Road and Race	105
10	(United States) Ryan Gates	(United States) 311RS Motorsports	98
11	(United States) Sean McAlister	(United States) JDX Racing	94
12	(Dominican Republic) Efrin Castro	(New Zealand) Team Hardpoint EBM	58
13	(United States) Alan Metni	(Canada) Kelly-Moss Road and Race	58
14	(Sweden) Erik Johansson	(Germany) MRS GT-Racing	50
15	(United States) Hutton McKenna	(United States) Topp Racing	35
16	(United States) Curt Swearingin	(United States) ACI Motorsports	30
17	(Germany) Leon Köhler	(Germany) MRS GT-Racing	23
18	(United States) Tim Pappas	(United States) Black Swan with JDX Racing	23
19	(United States) John Goetz	(United States) Wright Motorsports	15
20	(United States) Steve Dunn	(Germany) MRS GT-Racing	12
21	(United States) Jimmy Llibre	(Germany) MRS GT-Racing	10
22	(Canada) Thomas Collingwood	(United States) BGB Motorsport	7
23	(United States) Bill Smith	(United States) Topp Racing	6
24	(United States) Jeffrey Majkrzak	(United States) Goldcrest Motorsports	3
25	(United States) Rene Robichaud	(Canada) Kelly-Moss Road and Race	2
