= IFLY (company) =

Indoor skydiving company

iFLY
- iFLY logo
- Formerly: SkyVenture
- Type: Private
- Industry: Entertainment
- Founders: Alan Metni; Bill Kitchen
- Headquarters: Austin, Texas
- Services: Indoor Skydiving
- Website: https://www.iflyworld.com/

iFLY Holdings (formerly SkyVenture) is an operator and manufacturer of vertical wind tunnels for indoor skydiving.

== History ==
iFLY was founded as SkyVenture in 1999 by American inventor Bill Kitchen in Orlando, Florida. The Orlando tunnel was the first one built specifically for commercial use, and solved many issues relating to safety and enjoyability. In 2002, entrepreneur and skydiving enthusiast Alan Metni visited the SkyVenture tunnel and was so impressed by the experience that he purchased the business from Kitchen and rebranded it as iFLY.

iFLY manufactures recirculating tunnels ranging from 10.5 to 14 feet in diameter. Since its founding, iFLY has commissioned 100 tunnels, operated in 20 countries, and flown over 54 million flights. iFLY offers both corporate owned as well as franchised locations. A full list of tunnel locations can be found here.
