= Alan Metni =

American entrepreneur and racing driver

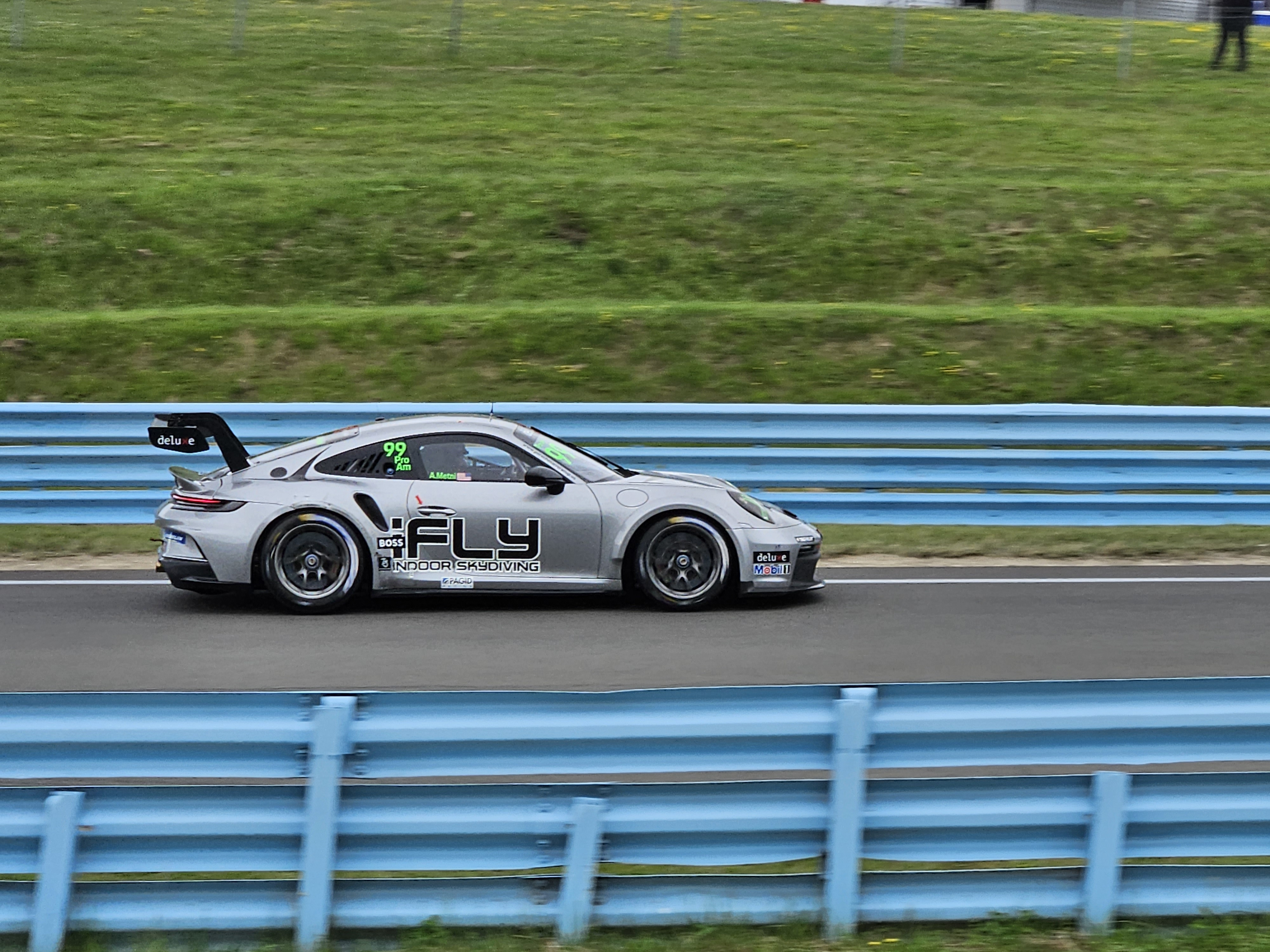
- Metni at Watkins Glen in 2023
- Nationality: (United States) American
- Born: April 15, 1967 (age 59) Austin, Texas, United States

IMSA SportsCar Championship career
- Debut season: 2021
- Current team: Kelly-Moss with Riley
- Categorisation: FIA Bronze
- Car number: 99
- Former teams: NTE Sport
- Starts: 10
- Wins: 1
- Podiums: 1
- Poles: 0
- Fastest laps: 0

Championship titles
- 2022: Porsche Carrera Cup North America – Pro-Am
- Statistics up to date as of November 3, 2023.

Alan Metni (born April 15, 1967) is an American racing driver who competes in the IMSA SportsCar Championship and Porsche Carrera Cup North America. He is a former skydiver and CEO of IFly Holdings.

== Motorsports ==
=== Early career ===
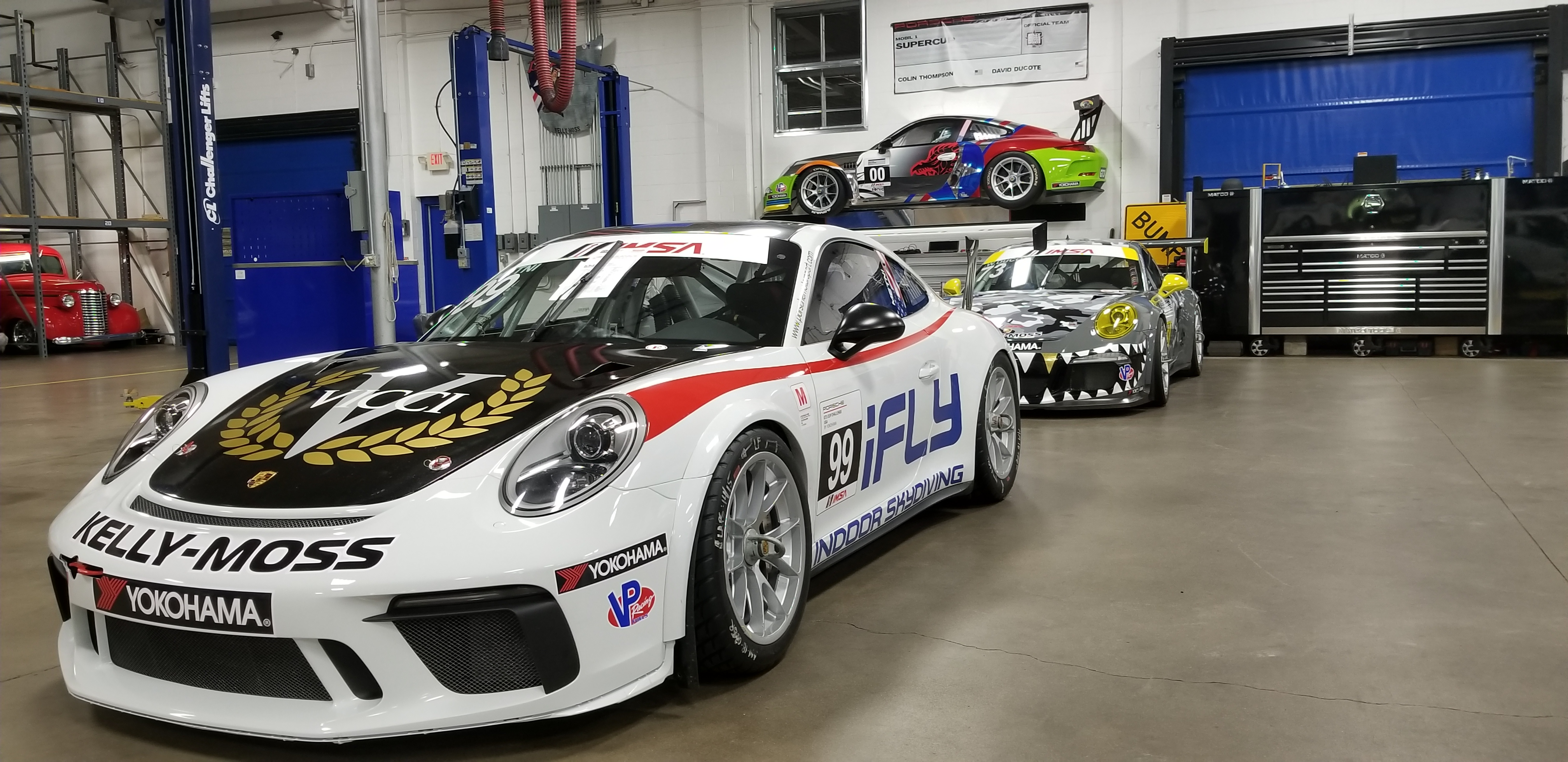
Metni's Porsche 911 GT3 Cup in 2018.

Metni began his professional racing career in 2017, taking part in the Gold class of the IMSA GT3 Cup Challenge for Kelly-Moss Road and Race. Prior to the start of the season, Metni had only participated in track days, and "came to [motorsports] really, really late." He was invited to a track day by a friend, which eventually led to him searching for a full-time drive with Kelly-Moss for 2017. Through 16 races, he claimed a sole class podium finish en route to a sixth-place finish in the championship. At the end of the year, Metni also took part in the 24 Hours of COTA with Brookspeed International Motorsport, taking the SP3 class victory.

Metni returned to the series in 2018, graduating to the Platinum class designated for current-spec Porsche Cup cars. Metni competed in the Platinum Masters subclass, composed of drivers over the age of 45. With three class victories in the final four races, Metni claimed the Platinum Masters title following the final race of the season at Road Atlanta. Metni also completed a one-off weekend in the Pirelli World Challenge at COTA, claiming a podium finish in the second race of the weekend. Metni claimed his second consecutive Platinum Masters title in 2019, scoring eight class victories over the course of 16 races. During the 2019 season, Metni stated that his goal was to be competing at the front end of the overall field by the end of the year.

2020 saw Metni continue in the IMSA GT3 Cup Challenge for its final season, once again with Kelly-Moss. At VIR in August, he claimed his maiden overall victory in the series, claiming that his race win was "one for the old guys." This victory was one of ten Platinum Masters victories that Metni collected in 2020 as he scored his third consecutive class title. He once again added a single weekend in the Am class of the GT World Challenge America, driving for Park Place Motorsports.

=== Porsche Carrera Cup North America ===
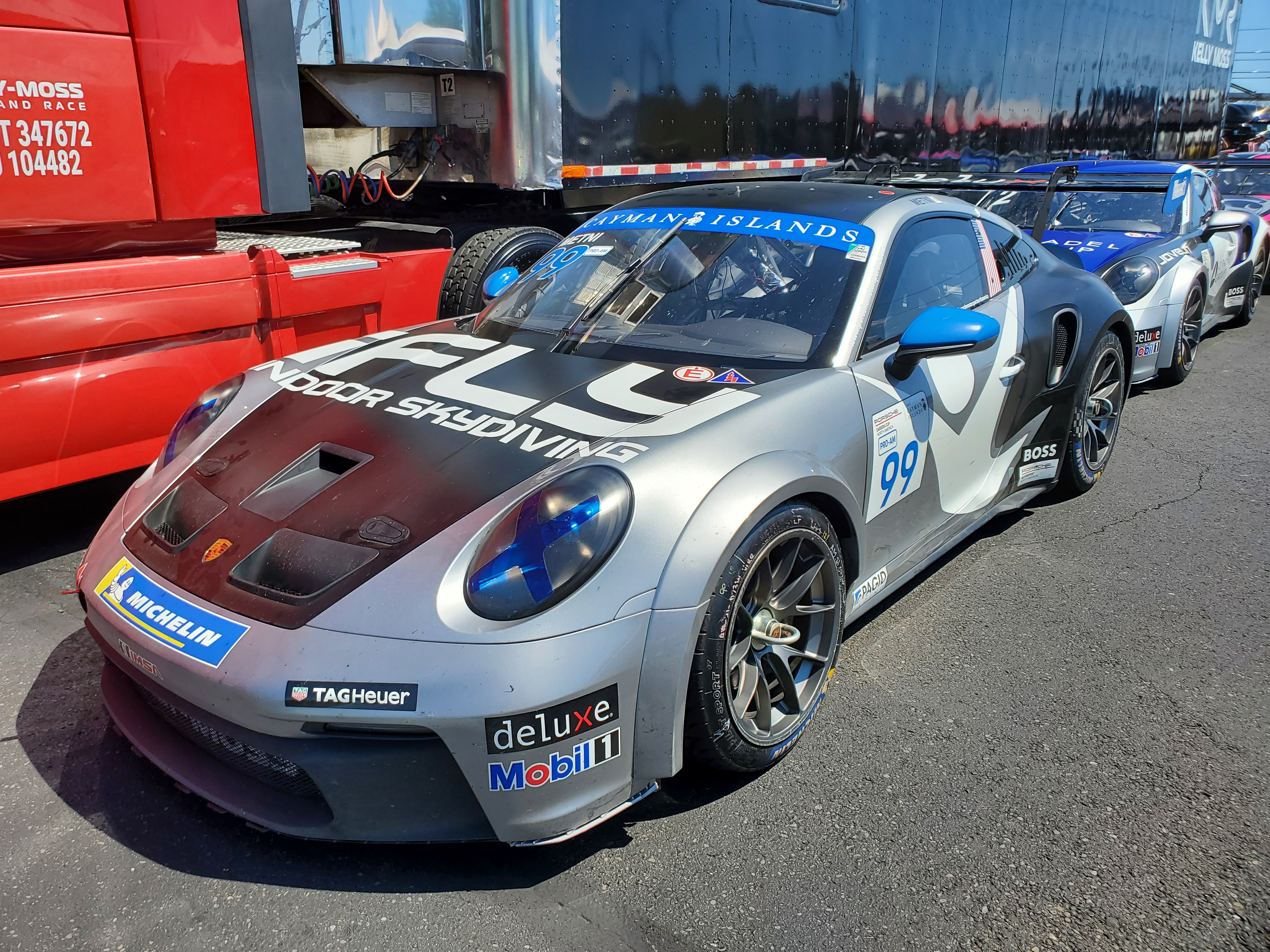
Metni's Porsche 911 GT3 Cup at Watkins Glen in 2022.

Metni remained with Kelly-Moss through the transition from IMSA GT3 Cup Challenge to Porsche Carrera Cup North America, lining up in the Pro-Am class for 2021. Metni also engaged in a full-time effort in the Lamborghini Super Trofeo North America, taking part in the Am class for Change Racing. Prior to the start of each of these campaigns, however, Metni made his debut in the IMSA SportsCar Championship, taking on a drive in the 2021 24 Hours of Daytona with NTE Sport. The entry finished 15th in GTD with Metni, Don Yount, Andrew Davis, and J. R. Hildebrand at the wheel following gearbox problems. Metni's Porsche Cup campaign began successfully, as he claimed the series' first Pro-Am class victory at Sebring. He became engaged in a season-long battle for the Pro-Am championship with Efrin Castro, with Metni taking an early lead thanks to a sweep of the first two race weekends. However, Castro's sweep of the triple-header finale at Road Atlanta, combined with two poor finishes for Metni, meant that Castro scored the Pro-Am title for 2021. Metni also saw early success in his Super Trofeo campaign, leading to a difficult double-header weekend between the two series in September. The Porsche Cup event at Indianapolis fell on the same weekend as the Super Trofeo round at Laguna Seca, and with Metni still in contention for both championships he elected to attempt both. He began the weekend in California before flying overnight to Indiana to take on the second and third Porsche Cup races, scoring last-place points in both championships for the races he missed.

Metni consolidated his efforts in 2022, running only in the Porsche Carrera Cup North America. Once again, himself and Castro were embroiled in the Pro-Am championship battle throughout the season, entering the final weekend separated by just 14 points. Despite Castro's seven victories far outnumbering Metni's three, Metni entered the Road Atlanta round with the championship lead. Although Castro swept the weekend, a second and third-place finish for Metni in the last two races meant he claimed the championship by one point.

=== IMSA SportsCar Championship ===
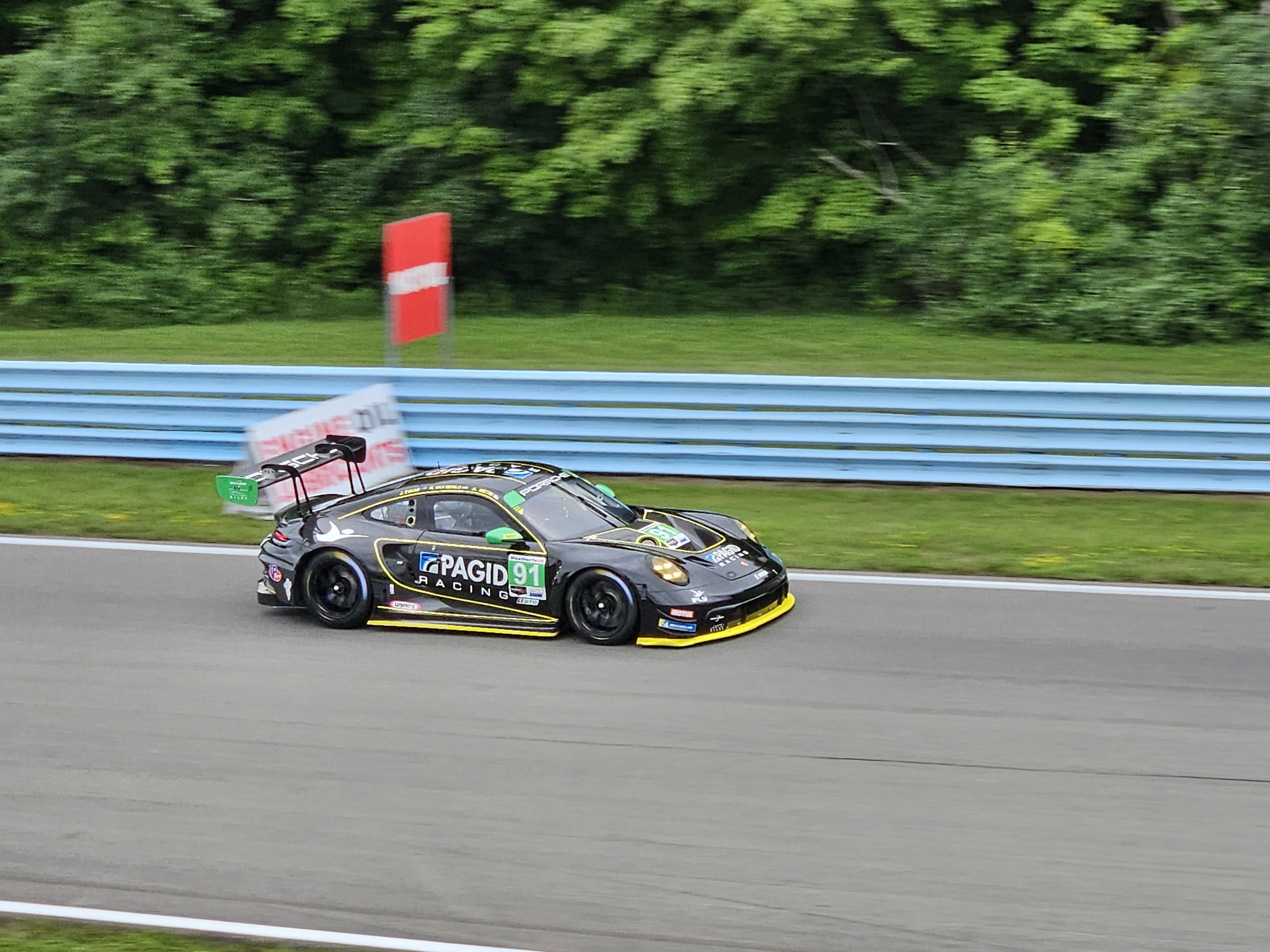
Metni's Porsche 911 GT3 R in 2023.

In 2023, Metni graduated to a full-time drive in the IMSA SportsCar Championship, driving for the new Kelly-Moss with Riley operation alongside Kay van Berlo. Metni additionally continued part-time in the Porsche Carrera Cup, pulling double duty on several weekends between both series in order to gain more track experience. At Laguna Seca in May, Metni claimed his first IMSA SportsCar Championship victory. However, the rest of the season saw Metni and van Berlo finish no higher than seventh in any given race, and a non-racing injury for Metni forced the team to miss the season-ending Petit Le Mans.

== Skydiving ==
=== Career ===
Metni's skydiving career began at the age of 21 after reading a newspaper advertisement for a local skydiving establishment, Skydive San Marcos. Following his first flight, he developed a passion for the sport, joining the Texas Skydivers Club in association with the University of Texas at Austin, where he was studying at the time. After successes in regional and national championships, Metni quit his job as a lawyer, electing to pursue a spot on the national skydiving team and moving to Arizona.

=== IFly Indoor Skydiving ===
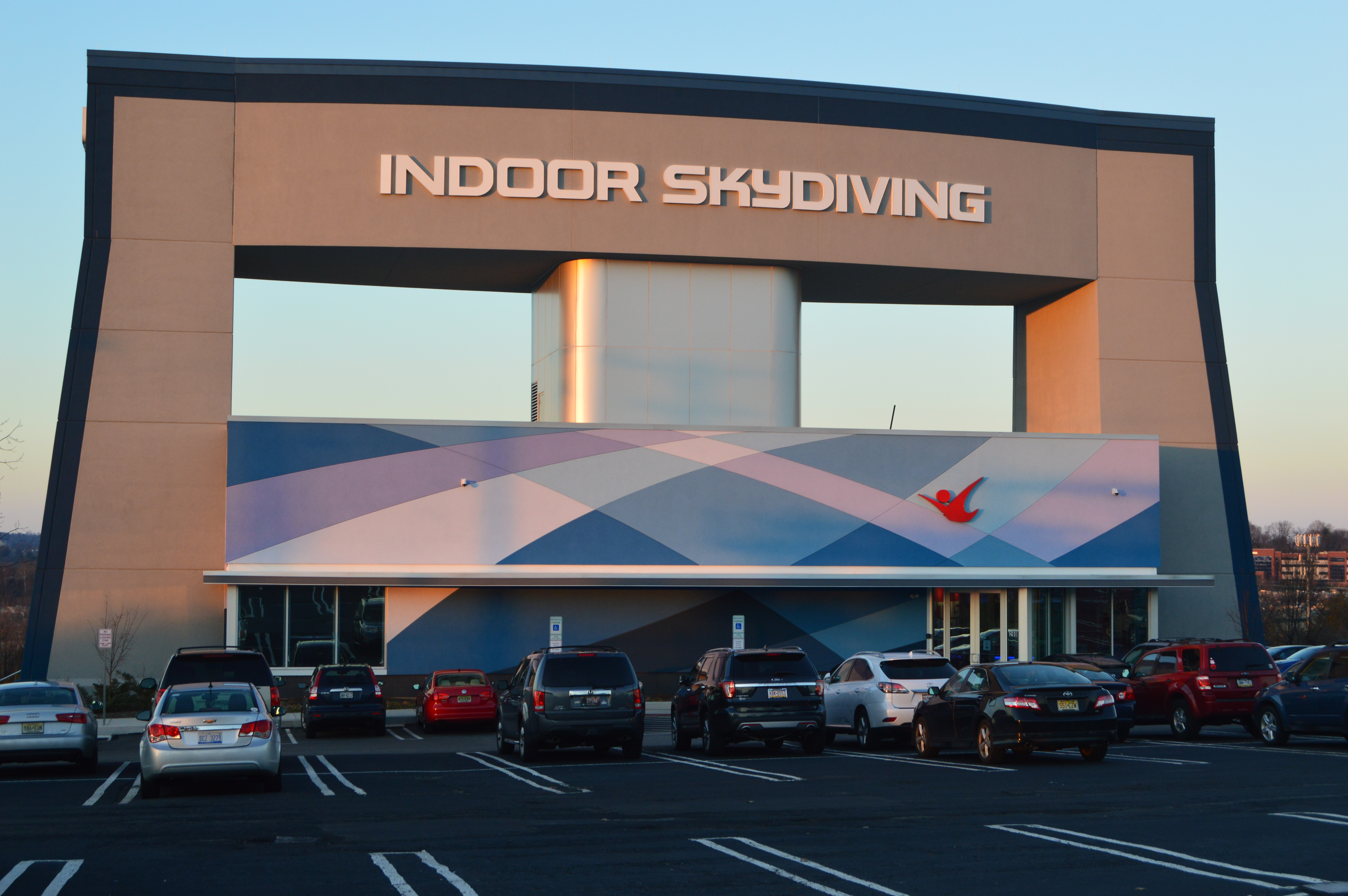
IFly location in King of Prussia, Pennsylvania.

In 1999, Metni paid a visit to SkyVenture, an indoor skydiving facility located in Orlando, Florida. Impressed with the facility, Metni proposed a business venture between himself and SkyVenture's owner Bill Kitchen, leading to the creation of iFLY in 2002. The company's wind tunnels featured a unique wall-to-wall or open-flow wind tunnel design, which pulled air upwards through the enclosed chamber. Such a design improved airflow, but drastically increased noise and removed the ability for interior climate control.

As of 2023, the company has opened over 100 locations in more than nine countries. Locations also engage in STEM events to teach the public about the science behind the company's wind tunnels.

== Racing record ==
=== Career summary ===
Season	Series	Team	Races	Wins	Poles	F/Laps	Podiums	Points	Position
2017	IMSA GT3 Cup Challenge – Gold	Kelly-Moss Road and Race	16	0	0	0	1	154	6th
2017	24H Series – SP3-GT4	Brookspeed International Motorsport	1	1	0	0	1	0	NC
2018	IMSA GT3 Cup Challenge – Platinum	AM Motorsports/Kelly-Moss	16	0	0	0	0	345	7th
2018	Pirelli World Challenge SprintX – GTC	AM Motorsports	2	0	1	1	1	43	**2nd**
2018	24H Series – 991	JDX Racing	1	1	0	0	1	42	NC
2019	IMSA GT3 Cup Challenge – Platinum	Kelly-Moss/AM Motorsports	16	0	0	0	3	388	5th
2019	IMSA GT3 Cup Challenge Canada – Platinum	Kelly-Moss/AM Motorsports	?	?	?	?	?	?	?
2019	GT World Challenge America – Am	Autometrics Motorsports	2	0	1	0	0	26	11th
2019	24H Series – 991	Kelly-Moss Road and Race	1	0	0	0	0	0	NC
2020	IMSA GT3 Cup Challenge – Platinum	Kelly-Moss/AM Motorsports	16	1	0	1	6	433	4th
2020	GT World Challenge America – Am	Park Place Motorsports	2	0	2	0	2	36	**3rd**
2021	Porsche Carrera Cup North America – Pro-Am	iFLY Racing/Kelly-Moss	15	8	7	8	12	316	**2nd**
2021	Lamborghini Super Trofeo North America – Am	Change Racing	12	0	0	1	8	120	**3rd**
2021	IMSA SportsCar Championship – GTD	NTE Sport	1	0	0	0	0	176	73rd
2021	24H Series – GT4	RENNtech Motorsports	1	0	0	0	0	0	NC
2022	Porsche Carrera Cup North America – Pro-Am	Kelly-Moss Road and Race	16	3	?	?	13	289	**1st**
2023	IMSA SportsCar Championship – GTD	Kelly-Moss with Riley	10	1	0	0	1	2289	13th
2023	Porsche Carrera Cup North America	Kelly-Moss Road and Race	7	0	0	0	0	5	34th
2023	Porsche Carrera Cup North America – Pro-Am	Kelly-Moss Road and Race	7	2	1	1	4	124	7th
2024	Porsche Carrera Cup North America	Kellymoss	16	0	0	0	0	21	18th
2024	GT World Challenge America – Pro-Am	Mercedes-AMG Austin with Esses Racing	2	0	0	0	0	3	23rd
2024	GT World Challenge America – Am	Mercedes-AMG Austin with Esses Racing	2	1	1	1	2	43	**2nd**
2025	Porsche Carrera Cup North America	Kellymoss	16	0	0	0	0	24	19th
2026	Porsche Carrera Cup North America	Kellymoss	16	0	0	0	0	94	8th

^{*} Season still in progress.

=== Complete WeatherTech SportsCar Championship results ===
(key) (Races in bold indicate pole position)

Year	Team	Class	Make	Engine	1	2	3	4	5	6	7	8	9	10	11	12	Rank	Points
2021	NTE Sport	GTD	Audi R8 LMS Evo	Audi 5.2 L V10	DAY; 15	SEB	MDO	DET	WGL	WGL	LIM	ELK	LGA	LBH	VIR	PET	73rd	175
2023	Kelly-Moss with Riley	GTD	Porsche 911 GT3 R (992)	Porsche 4.2 L Flat-6	DAY; 16	SEB; 7	LBH; 12	LGA; 1	WGL; 17	MOS; 9	LIM; 14	ELK; 9	VIR; 8	IMS; 11	PET		13th	2289

^{*} Season still in progress.

Sporting positions
Preceded by Efrin Castro	Porsche Carrera Cup North America; Pro-Am Champion; 2022	Succeeded by Efrin Castro
