= 2021 24 Hours of Daytona =

59th 24 Hours of Daytona race

Previous: 2020	Next: 2022
Index: Races | Winners

Map of the Daytona International Speedway combined road course

The 2021 24 Hours of Daytona (formally the 2021 Rolex 24 at Daytona) was an endurance sports car race sanctioned by the International Motor Sports Association (IMSA). The event was held at Daytona International Speedway combined road course in Daytona Beach, Florida, on January 30–31, 2021. This event was the 59th running of the 24 Hours of Daytona, and the first of 12 races across multiple classes in the 2021 IMSA SportsCar Championship, as well as the first of four rounds in the 2021 Michelin Endurance Cup. Acura scored its first overall 24 Hours of Daytona victory, while Wayne Taylor Racing became the second team to win the race three times in a row.

== Background ==
Daytona International Speedway, where the race was held

NASCAR founder Bill France Sr., who built Daytona International Speedway in 1959, conceived of the 24 Hours of Daytona to attract European sports-car endurance racing to the United States and provide international exposure to the speedway. It is informally considered part of the Triple Crown of Endurance Racing, with the 12 Hours of Sebring and the 24 Hours of Le Mans.

International Motor Sports Association's (IMSA) president John Doonan confirmed the race was part of the schedule for the 2021 IMSA SportsCar Championship (IMSA SCC) in September 2020. It was the eighth consecutive year it was part of the IMSA SCC, and 59th 24 Hours of Daytona. The 24 Hours of Daytona was the first of twelve sports car endurance races of 2021 by IMSA, and the first of four races of the Michelin Endurance Cup (MEC). It took place at the 12-turn, 3.56-mile (5.73 km) Daytona International Speedway in Daytona Beach, Florida from January 30 to 31.

== Entries ==
With the addition of the Le Mans Prototype 3 (LMP3) class, despite the onset of the COVID-19 pandemic, the number of entrants to the 24-hour race saw a marked improvement from the 2020 running of the event, with 50 entries registered. There were seven entries in the Daytona Prototype International (DPi) class, ten in LMP2, seven in LMP3, six in GT Le Mans (GTLM), and 20 in GT Daytona (GTD). Some notable entries include Chip Ganassi Racing, who are registered to participate in the Daytona Prototype international (DPi) class with the Cadillac DPi-V.R. This marked Chip Ganassi Racing's return to top-level sportscar competition in America after a one-year absence following the withdrawal of their Ford GTE program at the end of the 2019 season, and their first race in prototypes since the 2016 edition of the 24-hour race.

The Le Mans Prototype 2 (LMP2) class also saw a flourish of international interest, with ten entries registered, the highest entry count since LMP2 was made its own class. Several of the teams, such as DragonSpeed, Racing Team Nederland, and High Class Racing, are mainstays of the FIA World Endurance Championship. Many of the LMP2 driver rosters include world-class drivers, such as Nicolas Lapierre, Giedo van der Garde, and Ben Hanley, among others.

The entry count would drop to 49 for the race itself. Just prior to the testing weekend, the team owner of Porsche GT Daytona entrant Black Swan Racing, Tim Pappas, tested positive for COVID-19. He had contracted it after racing in the 2021 Dubai 24 Hour event two weeks prior. As a safety precaution, Pappas withdrew the entire team, which consisted of himself, Porsche factory driver Patrick Pilet, Patrick Lindsey, and Larry ten Voorde, who also tested positive for COVID-19 shortly after Pappas.

== Pre-race ==
=== Balance of Performance ===
Prior to the 24-hour race, and indeed the mandatory testing session that came a week prior, IMSA released a technical bulletin regarding the Balance of Performance for the 24 Hours of Daytona. Every year a unique set of BoP constraints are determined exclusively for the 24-hour event, due to the unique challenges the length of the race brings relative to the other events in the IMSA calendar. There was a large focus on changes in the GT classes. After winning both the 2019 and 2020 editions of the Rolex, the BMW M8 GTE was put at a 10-kilogram weight disadvantage, along with restricted levels of turbo boost. Meanwhile, the Porsche 911 RSR and Chevrolet Corvette C8.R were both given increases in the sizes of their air restrictors, with the latter being made 10 kilograms lighter. In GTD, several cars had their constraints changed, most notably the Porsche 911 GT3 R and 2020-edition-winning Lamborghini Huracan GT3. The former was given a hefty 20-kilogram weight increase, and the latter would run at restricted power levels.

== Roar Before the 24 ==
=== Motul Pole Award 100 ===
The Motul Pole Award 100 was held January 24. It was a qualifying race, awarding qualifying points and determining the starting lineup for the 24 Hours of Daytona.

==== Results ====
Pos	Class	No.	Team / Entrant	Drivers	Chassis	Laps	Time/Retired
Pos	Class	No.	Team / Entrant	Drivers	Engine	Laps	Time/Retired
1	**DPi**	**31**	**Whelen Engineering Racing**	**(Brazil) Pipo Derani (Brazil) Felipe Nasr**	**Cadillac DPi-V.R**	**51**	**1:41:06.688**
1	**DPi**	**31**	**Whelen Engineering Racing**	**(Brazil) Pipo Derani (Brazil) Felipe Nasr**	**Cadillac 5.5 L V8**	**51**	**1:41:06.688**
2	DPi	55	Mazda Motorsports	(United Kingdom) Oliver Jarvis (United Kingdom) Harry Tincknell	Mazda RT24-P	51	+3.664
2	DPi	55	Mazda Motorsports	(United Kingdom) Oliver Jarvis (United Kingdom) Harry Tincknell	Mazda MZ-2.0T 2.0 L Turbo I4	51	+3.664
3	DPi	5	Mustang Sampling / JDC-Miller Motorsports	(France) Loïc Duval (France) Tristan Vautier	Cadillac DPi-V.R	51	+4.627
3	DPi	5	Mustang Sampling / JDC-Miller Motorsports	(France) Loïc Duval (France) Tristan Vautier	Cadillac 5.5 L V8	51	+4.627
4	DPi	60	Meyer Shank Racing w/Curb-Agajanian	(United States) Dane Cameron (France) Olivier Pla (Colombia) Juan Pablo Montoya	Acura ARX-05	51	+6.995
4	DPi	60	Meyer Shank Racing w/Curb-Agajanian	(United States) Dane Cameron (France) Olivier Pla (Colombia) Juan Pablo Montoya	Acura AR35TT 3.5 L Turbo V6	51	+6.995
5	DPi	10	Konica Minolta Acura ARX-05	(Portugal) Filipe Albuquerque (United States) Ricky Taylor	Acura ARX-05	51	+8.997
5	DPi	10	Konica Minolta Acura ARX-05	(Portugal) Filipe Albuquerque (United States) Ricky Taylor	Acura AR35TT 3.5 L Turbo V6	51	+8.997
6	DPi	48	Ally Cadillac Racing	(United States) Jimmie Johnson (Japan) Kamui Kobayashi	Cadillac DPi-V.R	51	+19.985
6	DPi	48	Ally Cadillac Racing	(United States) Jimmie Johnson (Japan) Kamui Kobayashi	Cadillac 5.5 L V8	51	+19.985
7	DPi	01	Cadillac Chip Ganassi Racing	(Denmark) Kevin Magnussen (Netherlands) Renger van der Zande	Cadillac DPi-V.R	51	+1:14.834
7	DPi	01	Cadillac Chip Ganassi Racing	(Denmark) Kevin Magnussen (Netherlands) Renger van der Zande	Cadillac 5.5 L V8	51	+1:14.834
8	**LMP2**	**52**	**PR1 Mathiasen Motorsports**	**(Denmark) Mikkel Jensen** **(United States) Ben Keating**	**Oreca 07**	**51**	**+1:33.798**
8	**LMP2**	**52**	**PR1 Mathiasen Motorsports**	**(Denmark) Mikkel Jensen** **(United States) Ben Keating**	**Gibson Technology GK428 4.2 L V8**	**51**	**+1:33.798**
9	LMP2	20	High Class Racing	(Denmark) Dennis Andersen (Austria) Ferdinand Habsburg-Lothringen	Oreca 07	50	+1 Lap
9	LMP2	20	High Class Racing	(Denmark) Dennis Andersen (Austria) Ferdinand Habsburg-Lothringen	Gibson Technology GK428 4.2 L V8	50	+1 Lap
10	LMP2	8	Tower Motorsport	(France) Gabriel Aubry (Canada) John Farano	Oreca 07	50	+1 Lap
10	LMP2	8	Tower Motorsport	(France) Gabriel Aubry (Canada) John Farano	Gibson Technology GK428 4.2 L V8	50	+1 Lap
11	LMP2	29	Racing Team Nederland	(Netherlands) Frits van Eerd (Netherlands) Giedo van der Garde	Oreca 07	50	+1 Lap
11	LMP2	29	Racing Team Nederland	(Netherlands) Frits van Eerd (Netherlands) Giedo van der Garde	Gibson Technology GK428 4.2 L V8	50	+1 Lap
12	LMP2	81	DragonSpeed USA LLC	(Canada) Garett Grist (United States) Rob Hodes	Oreca 07	50	+1 Lap
12	LMP2	81	DragonSpeed USA LLC	(Canada) Garett Grist (United States) Rob Hodes	Gibson Technology GK428 4.2 L V8	50	+1 Lap
13	LMP2	47	Cetilar Racing	(Italy) Antonio Fuoco (Italy) Roberto Lacorte	Dallara P217	50	+1 Lap
13	LMP2	47	Cetilar Racing	(Italy) Antonio Fuoco (Italy) Roberto Lacorte	Gibson Technology GK428 4.2 L V8	50	+1 Lap
14	LMP2	18	Era Motorsport	(France) Paul-Loup Chatin (United States) Dwight Merriman	Oreca 07	49	+2 Laps
14	LMP2	18	Era Motorsport	(France) Paul-Loup Chatin (United States) Dwight Merriman	Gibson Technology GK428 4.2 L V8	49	+2 Laps
15	LMP2	51	RWR-Eurasia	(United States) Cody Ware (Turkey) Salih Yoluç	Ligier JS P217	49	+2 Laps
15	LMP2	51	RWR-Eurasia	(United States) Cody Ware (Turkey) Salih Yoluç	Gibson Technology GK428 4.2 L V8	49	+2 Laps
16	**GTLM**	**4**	**Corvette Racing**	**(United Kingdom) Alexander Sims** **(United Kingdom) Nick Tandy**	**Chevrolet Corvette C8.R**	**49**	**+2 Laps**
16	**GTLM**	**4**	**Corvette Racing**	**(United Kingdom) Alexander Sims** **(United Kingdom) Nick Tandy**	**Chevrolet 5.5 L V8**	**49**	**+2 Laps**
17	GTLM	3	Corvette Racing	(Netherlands) Nicky Catsburg (United States) Jordan Taylor	Chevrolet Corvette C8.R	49	+2 Laps
17	GTLM	3	Corvette Racing	(Netherlands) Nicky Catsburg (United States) Jordan Taylor	Chevrolet 5.5 L V8	49	+2 Laps
18	GTLM	79	WeatherTech Racing	(France) Kévin Estre (United States) Cooper MacNeil	Porsche 911 RSR-19	49	+2 Laps
18	GTLM	79	WeatherTech Racing	(France) Kévin Estre (United States) Cooper MacNeil	Porsche 4.2 L Flat-6	49	+2 Laps
19	LMP2	82	DragonSpeed USA LLC	(Canada) Devlin DeFrancesco (United States) Eric Lux	Oreca 07	48	+3 Laps
19	LMP2	82	DragonSpeed USA LLC	(Canada) Devlin DeFrancesco (United States) Eric Lux	Gibson Technology GK428 4.2 L V8	48	+3 Laps
20	LMP2	11	WIN Autosport	(United States) Tristan Nunez (United States) Steven Thomas	Oreca 07	48	+3 Laps
20	LMP2	11	WIN Autosport	(United States) Tristan Nunez (United States) Steven Thomas	Gibson Technology GK428 4.2 L V8	48	+3 Laps
21	GTLM	62	Risi Competizione	(United Kingdom) James Calado (Italy) Alessandro Pier Guidi	Ferrari 488 GTE	48	+3 Laps
21	GTLM	62	Risi Competizione	(United Kingdom) James Calado (Italy) Alessandro Pier Guidi	Ferrari F154CB 3.9 L Turbo V8	48	+3 Laps
22	**GTD**	**96**	**Turner Motorsport**	**(United States) Bill Auberlen** **(United States) Robby Foley**	**BMW M6 GT3**	**48**	**+3 Laps**
22	**GTD**	**96**	**Turner Motorsport**	**(United States) Bill Auberlen** **(United States) Robby Foley**	**BMW 4.4 L Turbo V8**	**48**	**+3 Laps**
23	GTD	9	Pfaff Motorsports	(Canada) Zacharie Robichon (Belgium) Laurens Vanthoor	Porsche 911 GT3 R	48	+3 Laps
23	GTD	9	Pfaff Motorsports	(Canada) Zacharie Robichon (Belgium) Laurens Vanthoor	Porsche 4.0 L Flat-6	48	+3 Laps
24	GTD	111	GRT Grasser Racing Team	(Italy) Mirko Bortolotti (Switzerland) Rolf Ineichen	Lamborghini Huracán GT3 EVO	48	+3 Laps
24	GTD	111	GRT Grasser Racing Team	(Italy) Mirko Bortolotti (Switzerland) Rolf Ineichen	Lamborghini 5.2 L V10	48	+3 Laps
25	GTLM	25	BMW Team RLL	(Austria) Philipp Eng (Germany) Timo Glock	BMW M8 GTE	48	+3 Laps
25	GTLM	25	BMW Team RLL	(Austria) Philipp Eng (Germany) Timo Glock	BMW S63 4.0 L Turbo V8	48	+3 Laps
26	GTD	14	Vasser Sullivan	(United Kingdom) Oliver Gavin (United States) Aaron Telitz	Lexus RC F GT3	48	+3 Laps
26	GTD	14	Vasser Sullivan	(United Kingdom) Oliver Gavin (United States) Aaron Telitz	Lexus 5.4 L V8	48	+3 Laps
27	**LMP3**	**6**	**Mühlner Motorsports America**	**(Germany) Laurents Hörr** **(Germany) Moritz Kranz**	**Duqueine D-08**	**48**	**+3 Laps**
27	**LMP3**	**6**	**Mühlner Motorsports America**	**(Germany) Laurents Hörr** **(Germany) Moritz Kranz**	**Nissan VK56DE 5.6L V8**	**48**	**+3 Laps**
28	GTD	57	Winward Racing	(United Kingdom) Philip Ellis (United States) Russell Ward	Mercedes-AMG GT3	48	+3 Laps
28	GTD	57	Winward Racing	(United Kingdom) Philip Ellis (United States) Russell Ward	Mercedes-AMG M159 6.2 L V8	48	+3 Laps
29	GTD	23	Heart of Racing Team	(Canada) Roman De Angelis (United Kingdom) Ian James	Aston Martin Vantage GT3	47	+4 Laps
29	GTD	23	Heart of Racing Team	(Canada) Roman De Angelis (United Kingdom) Ian James	Aston Martin 4.0 L Turbo V8	47	+4 Laps
30	LMP3	7	Forty7 Motorsports	(United States) Mark Kvamme (United States) Ryan Norman	Duqueine D-08	47	+4 Laps
30	LMP3	7	Forty7 Motorsports	(United States) Mark Kvamme (United States) Ryan Norman	Nissan VK56DE 5.6L V8	47	+4 Laps
31	GTLM	24	BMW Team RLL	(Brazil) Augusto Farfus (Germany) Marco Wittmann	BMW M8 GTE	47	+4 Laps
31	GTLM	24	BMW Team RLL	(Brazil) Augusto Farfus (Germany) Marco Wittmann	BMW S63 4.0 L Turbo V8	47	+4 Laps
32	LMP3	54	CORE Autosport	(United States) Jon Bennett (United States) George Kurtz	Ligier JS P320	47	+4 Laps
32	LMP3	54	CORE Autosport	(United States) Jon Bennett (United States) George Kurtz	Nissan VK56DE 5.6L V8	47	+4 Laps
33	GTD	63	Scuderia Corsa	(United States) Bret Curtis (United Arab Emirates) Ed Jones	Ferrari 488 GT3	47	+4 Laps
33	GTD	63	Scuderia Corsa	(United States) Bret Curtis (United Arab Emirates) Ed Jones	Ferrari F154CB 3.9 L Turbo V8	47	+4 Laps
34	GTD	16	Wright Motorsports	(United States) Ryan Hardwick (United States) Patrick Long	Porsche 911 GT3 R	47	+4 Laps
34	GTD	16	Wright Motorsports	(United States) Ryan Hardwick (United States) Patrick Long	Porsche 4.0 L Flat-6	47	+4 Laps
35	GTD	12	Vasser Sullivan	(United States) Robert Megennis (United States) Zach Veach	Lexus RC F GT3	46	+5 Laps
35	GTD	12	Vasser Sullivan	(United States) Robert Megennis (United States) Zach Veach	Lexus 5.4 L V8	46	+5 Laps
36	GTD	75	SunEnergy1	(Australia) Kenny Habul (Italy) Raffaele Marciello	Mercedes-AMG GT3	46	+5 Laps
36	GTD	75	SunEnergy1	(Australia) Kenny Habul (Italy) Raffaele Marciello	Mercedes-AMG M159 6.2 L V8	46	+5 Laps
37	GTD	44	Magnus with Archangel	(United States) Andy Lally (United States) John Potter	Acura NSX GT3	45	+6 Laps
37	GTD	44	Magnus with Archangel	(United States) Andy Lally (United States) John Potter	Acura 3.5 L Turbo V6	45	+6 Laps
38	GTD	97	TF Sport	(Republic of Ireland) Charlie Eastwood (United States) Max Root	Aston Martin Vantage GT3	45	+6 Laps
38	GTD	97	TF Sport	(Republic of Ireland) Charlie Eastwood (United States) Max Root	Aston Martin 4.0 L Turbo V8	45	+6 Laps
39	GTD	88	Team Hardpoint EBM	(New Zealand) Earl Bamber (Denmark) Christina Nielsen	Porsche 911 GT3 R	45	+6 Laps
39	GTD	88	Team Hardpoint EBM	(New Zealand) Earl Bamber (Denmark) Christina Nielsen	Porsche 4.0 L Flat-6	45	+6 Laps
40	GTD	28	Alegra Motorsports	(Canada) Daniel Morad (United States) Michael de Quesada	Mercedes-AMG GT3	45	+6 Laps
40	GTD	28	Alegra Motorsports	(Canada) Daniel Morad (United States) Michael de Quesada	Mercedes-AMG M159 6.2 L V8	45	+6 Laps
41	GTD	21	AF Corse	(Italy) Simon Mann (Denmark) Nicklas Nielsen	Ferrari 488 GT3	44	+7 Laps
41	GTD	21	AF Corse	(Italy) Simon Mann (Denmark) Nicklas Nielsen	Ferrari F154CB 3.9 L Turbo V8	44	+7 Laps
42 DNF	LMP3	33	Sean Creech Motorsport	(Portugal) João Barbosa (United States) Lance Willsey	Ligier JS P320	30	Not Running
42 DNF	LMP3	33	Sean Creech Motorsport	(Portugal) João Barbosa (United States) Lance Willsey	Nissan VK56DE 5.6L V8	30	Not Running
43 DNF	GTD	42	NTE Sport	(United States) Andrew Davis (United States) Alan Metni	Audi R8 LMS GT3	18	Not Running
43 DNF	GTD	42	NTE Sport	(United States) Andrew Davis (United States) Alan Metni	Audi BXA 5.2 L V10	18	Not Running
44 DNF	LMP3	38	Performance Tech Motorsports	(Canada) Cameron Cassels (Sweden) Rasmus Lindh	Ligier JS P320	13	Not Running
44 DNF	LMP3	38	Performance Tech Motorsports	(Canada) Cameron Cassels (Sweden) Rasmus Lindh	Nissan VK56DE 5.6L V8	13	Not Running
45 DNF	LMP3	91	Riley Motorsports	(United States) Jim Cox (United States) Dylan Murry	Ligier JS P320	8	Not Running
45 DNF	LMP3	91	Riley Motorsports	(United States) Jim Cox (United States) Dylan Murry	Nissan VK56DE 5.6L V8	8	Not Running
46 DNF	GTD	1	Paul Miller Racing	(United States) Madison Snow (United States) Bryan Sellers	Lamborghini Huracán GT3	2	Not Running
46 DNF	GTD	1	Paul Miller Racing	(United States) Madison Snow (United States) Bryan Sellers	Lamborghini 5.2 L V10	2	Not Running
47^{†}	GTD	19	GRT Grasser Racing Team	(Canada) Misha Goikhberg (France) Franck Perera	Lamborghini Huracán GT3	48	+3 Laps
47^{†}	GTD	19	GRT Grasser Racing Team	(Canada) Misha Goikhberg (France) Franck Perera	Lamborghini 5.2 L V10	48	+3 Laps
DNS	LMP3	74	Riley Motorsports	(United States) Spencer Pigot (United States) Gar Robinson	Ligier JS P320	0	Not Started
DNS	LMP3	74	Riley Motorsports	(United States) Spencer Pigot (United States) Gar Robinson	Nissan VK56DE 5.6L V8	0	Not Started
DNS	GTD	64	Team TGM	(United States) Ted Giovanis (United States) Owen Trinkler	Porsche 911 GT3 R	0	Not Started
DNS	GTD	64	Team TGM	(United States) Ted Giovanis (United States) Owen Trinkler	Porsche 4.0 L Flat-6	0	Not Started

Class winners in bold.

†: Post-event penalty. Moved to back of class.

== Post-race ==
Since it was the season's first race, Albuquerque, Castroneves, Ricky Taylor, and Rossi Pagenaud led the DPi Drivers' Championship with 376 points each. Johnson, Kobayashi, Pagenaud, and Rockenfeller were second with 345 points. Bomarito, Jarvis, and Tincknell were third with 332 points. Nicky Catsburg, Jordan Taylor, and Antonio García led the GTLM Drivers' Championship with 382 points each. Milner, Sims, and Tandy were second with 355 points. Edwards, Farfus, Krohn, and Wittmann were third with 325 points. Dontje, Ward, Ellis, and Engel led the GTD Drivers' Championship, followed by the second-placed Grenier, Habul, Marciello, and Stolz. Caldarelli, Lewis, Snow, and Sellers were third. LMP2 drivers and teams as well as LMP3 drivers and teams didn't score full season points due to the event only counting towards the Michelin Endurance Cup. WTR-Konica Minolta Acura, Corvette Racing, and Winward Racing became the leaders of their respective class Teams' Championships. Acura, Chevrolet, and Mercedes-AMG assumed the lead of their respective Manufacturers' Championships with eleven races left in the season.

== Results ==
Class winners denoted in bold and with ‡

Pos	Class	No.	Team / Entrant	Drivers	Chassis	Laps	Time/Retired
Pos	Class	No.	Team / Entrant	Drivers	Engine	Laps	Time/Retired
1	**DPi**	**10**	**(United States) Konica Minolta Acura ARX-05**	**(Portugal) Filipe Albuquerque (Brazil) Hélio Castroneves (United States) Alexander Rossi (United States) Ricky Taylor**	**Acura ARX-05**	**807**	**24:00:14.673‡**
1	**DPi**	**10**	**(United States) Konica Minolta Acura ARX-05**	**(Portugal) Filipe Albuquerque (Brazil) Hélio Castroneves (United States) Alexander Rossi (United States) Ricky Taylor**	**Acura AR35TT 3.5 L Turbo V6**	**807**	**24:00:14.673‡**
2	DPi	48	(United States) Ally Cadillac Racing	(United States) Jimmie Johnson (Japan) Kamui Kobayashi (France) Simon Pagenaud (Germany) Mike Rockenfeller	Cadillac DPi-V.R	807	+4.704
2	DPi	48	(United States) Ally Cadillac Racing	(United States) Jimmie Johnson (Japan) Kamui Kobayashi (France) Simon Pagenaud (Germany) Mike Rockenfeller	Cadillac 5.5 L V8	807	+4.704
3	DPi	55	(Canada) Mazda Motorsports	(United States) Jonathan Bomarito (United Kingdom) Oliver Jarvis (United Kingdom) Harry Tincknell	Mazda RT24-P	807	+6.562
3	DPi	55	(Canada) Mazda Motorsports	(United States) Jonathan Bomarito (United Kingdom) Oliver Jarvis (United Kingdom) Harry Tincknell	Mazda MZ-2.0T 2.0 L Turbo I4	807	+6.562
4	DPi	60	(United States) Meyer Shank Racing w/ Curb-Agajanian	(United States) A. J. Allmendinger (United States) Dane Cameron (Colombia) Juan Pablo Montoya (France) Olivier Pla	Acura ARX-05	807	+54.418
4	DPi	60	(United States) Meyer Shank Racing w/ Curb-Agajanian	(United States) A. J. Allmendinger (United States) Dane Cameron (Colombia) Juan Pablo Montoya (France) Olivier Pla	Acura AR35TT 3.5 L Turbo V6	807	+54.418
5	DPi	01	(United States) Cadillac Chip Ganassi Racing	(New Zealand) Scott Dixon (Denmark) Kevin Magnussen (Netherlands) Renger van der Zande	Cadillac DPi-V.R	807	+1:07.744
5	DPi	01	(United States) Cadillac Chip Ganassi Racing	(New Zealand) Scott Dixon (Denmark) Kevin Magnussen (Netherlands) Renger van der Zande	Cadillac 5.5 L V8	807	+1:07.744
6	**LMP2**	**18**	**(United States) Era Motorsport**	**(France) Paul-Loup Chatin (United Kingdom) Ryan Dalziel (United States) Dwight Merriman (United Kingdom) Kyle Tilley**	**Oreca 07**	**787**	**+20 Laps‡**
6	**LMP2**	**18**	**(United States) Era Motorsport**	**(France) Paul-Loup Chatin (United Kingdom) Ryan Dalziel (United States) Dwight Merriman (United Kingdom) Kyle Tilley**	**Gibson Technology GK428 V8**	**787**	**+20 Laps‡**
7	LMP2	8	(United Kingdom) Tower Motorsports by Starworks	(France) Gabriel Aubry (France) Timothé Buret (Canada) John Farano (France) Matthieu Vaxivière	Oreca 07	787	+20 Laps
7	LMP2	8	(United Kingdom) Tower Motorsports by Starworks	(France) Gabriel Aubry (France) Timothé Buret (Canada) John Farano (France) Matthieu Vaxivière	Gibson Technology GK428 V8	787	+20 Laps
8	DPi	31	(United States) Whelen Engineering Racing	(United Kingdom) Mike Conway (Brazil) Pipo Derani (United States) Chase Elliott (Brazil) Felipe Nasr	Cadillac DPi-V.R	783	+24 Laps
8	DPi	31	(United States) Whelen Engineering Racing	(United Kingdom) Mike Conway (Brazil) Pipo Derani (United States) Chase Elliott (Brazil) Felipe Nasr	Cadillac 5.5 L V8	783	+24 Laps
9	LMP2	82	(United States) DragonSpeed USA LLC	(Canada) Devlin DeFrancesco (United States) Eric Lux (Germany) Christopher Mies (Germany) Fabian Schiller	Oreca 07	783	+24 Laps
9	LMP2	82	(United States) DragonSpeed USA LLC	(Canada) Devlin DeFrancesco (United States) Eric Lux (Germany) Christopher Mies (Germany) Fabian Schiller	Gibson Technology GK428 V8	783	+24 Laps
10	LMP2	51	(Philippines) RWR-Eurasia	(United States) Austin Dillon (Germany) Sven Müller (United States) Cody Ware (Turkey) Salih Yoluç	Ligier JS P217	778	+29 Laps
10	LMP2	51	(Philippines) RWR-Eurasia	(United States) Austin Dillon (Germany) Sven Müller (United States) Cody Ware (Turkey) Salih Yoluç	Gibson Technology GK428 V8	778	+29 Laps
11	**GTLM**	**3**	**(United States) Corvette Racing**	**(Netherlands) Nicky Catsburg (Spain) Antonio García (United States) Jordan Taylor**	**Chevrolet Corvette C8.R**	**770**	**+37 Laps‡**
11	**GTLM**	**3**	**(United States) Corvette Racing**	**(Netherlands) Nicky Catsburg (Spain) Antonio García (United States) Jordan Taylor**	**Chevrolet 5.5 L V8**	**770**	**+37 Laps‡**
12	GTLM	4	(United States) Corvette Racing	(United States) Tommy Milner (United Kingdom) Alexander Sims (United Kingdom) Nick Tandy	Chevrolet Corvette C8.R	770	+37 Laps
12	GTLM	4	(United States) Corvette Racing	(United States) Tommy Milner (United Kingdom) Alexander Sims (United Kingdom) Nick Tandy	Chevrolet 5.5 L V8	770	+37 Laps
13	GTLM	24	(United States) BMW Team RLL	(United States) John Edwards (Brazil) Augusto Farfus (Finland) Jesse Krohn (Germany) Marco Wittmann	BMW M8 GTE	769	+38 Laps
13	GTLM	24	(United States) BMW Team RLL	(United States) John Edwards (Brazil) Augusto Farfus (Finland) Jesse Krohn (Germany) Marco Wittmann	BMW S63 4.0 L Turbo V8	769	+38 Laps
14	GTLM	62	(United States) Risi Competizione	(United Kingdom) James Calado (France) Jules Gounon (Italy) Alessandro Pier Guidi (Italy) Davide Rigon	Ferrari 488 GTE	769	+38 Laps
14	GTLM	62	(United States) Risi Competizione	(United Kingdom) James Calado (France) Jules Gounon (Italy) Alessandro Pier Guidi (Italy) Davide Rigon	Ferrari F154CB 3.9 L Turbo V8	769	+38 Laps
15	GTLM	25	(United States) BMW Team RLL	(Austria) Philipp Eng (Germany) Timo Glock (United States) Connor De Phillippi (Canada) Bruno Spengler	BMW M8 GTE	768	+39 Laps
15	GTLM	25	(United States) BMW Team RLL	(Austria) Philipp Eng (Germany) Timo Glock (United States) Connor De Phillippi (Canada) Bruno Spengler	BMW S63 4.0 L Turbo V8	768	+39 Laps
16	LMP2	11	(United States) WIN Autosport	(United Kingdom) Matthew Bell (United States) Thomas Merrill (United States) Tristan Nunez (United States) Steven Thomas	Oreca 07	764	+43 Laps
16	LMP2	11	(United States) WIN Autosport	(United Kingdom) Matthew Bell (United States) Thomas Merrill (United States) Tristan Nunez (United States) Steven Thomas	Gibson Technology GK428 V8	764	+43 Laps
17	GTLM	79	(United States) WeatherTech Racing	(Italy) Gianmaria Bruni (France) Kévin Estre (Austria) Richard Lietz (United States) Cooper MacNeil	Porsche 911 RSR-19	760	+47 Laps
17	GTLM	79	(United States) WeatherTech Racing	(Italy) Gianmaria Bruni (France) Kévin Estre (Austria) Richard Lietz (United States) Cooper MacNeil	Porsche 4.2 L Flat-6	760	+47 Laps
18	**LMP3**	**74**	**(United States) Riley Motorsports**	**(Australia) Scott Andrews (United States) Oliver Askew (United States) Spencer Pigot (United States) Gar Robinson**	**Ligier JS P320**	**757**	**+50 Laps‡**
18	**LMP3**	**74**	**(United States) Riley Motorsports**	**(Australia) Scott Andrews (United States) Oliver Askew (United States) Spencer Pigot (United States) Gar Robinson**	**Nissan VK56DE 5.6 L V8**	**757**	**+50 Laps‡**
19	LMP3	33	(United States) Sean Creech Motorsport	(Portugal) João Barbosa (United Kingdom) Wayne Boyd (France) Yann Clairay (United States) Lance Willsey	Ligier JS P320	754	+53 Laps
19	LMP3	33	(United States) Sean Creech Motorsport	(Portugal) João Barbosa (United Kingdom) Wayne Boyd (France) Yann Clairay (United States) Lance Willsey	Nissan VK56DE 5.6 L V8	754	+53 Laps
20	LMP3	6	(Belgium) Mühlner Motorsport America	(Germany) Laurents Hörr (United States) Kenton Koch (Germany) Mortiz Kranz (United Kingdom) Stevan McAleer	Duqueine M30 - D08	750	+57 Laps
20	LMP3	6	(Belgium) Mühlner Motorsport America	(Germany) Laurents Hörr (United States) Kenton Koch (Germany) Mortiz Kranz (United Kingdom) Stevan McAleer	Nissan VK56DE 5.6 L V8	750	+57 Laps
21	LMP3	91	(United States) Riley Motorsports	(Netherlands) Jeroen Bleekemolen (United States) Jim Cox (United States) Austin McCusker (United States) Dylan Murry	Ligier JS P320	746	+61 Laps
21	LMP3	91	(United States) Riley Motorsports	(Netherlands) Jeroen Bleekemolen (United States) Jim Cox (United States) Austin McCusker (United States) Dylan Murry	Nissan VK56DE 5.6 L V8	746	+61 Laps
22	**GTD**	**57**	**(United States) HTP Winward Racing**	**(Netherlands) Indy Dontje (United Kingdom) Philip Ellis (Germany) Maro Engel (United States) Russell Ward**	**Mercedes-AMG GT3 Evo**	**745**	**+62 Laps‡**
22	**GTD**	**57**	**(United States) HTP Winward Racing**	**(Netherlands) Indy Dontje (United Kingdom) Philip Ellis (Germany) Maro Engel (United States) Russell Ward**	**Mercedes-AMG M159 6.2 L V8**	**745**	**+62 Laps‡**
23	GTD	75	(Australia) SunEnergy1 Racing	(Canada) Mikaël Grenier (Australia) Kenny Habul (Italy) Raffaele Marciello (Germany) Luca Stolz	Mercedes-AMG GT3 Evo	745	+62 Laps
23	GTD	75	(Australia) SunEnergy1 Racing	(Canada) Mikaël Grenier (Australia) Kenny Habul (Italy) Raffaele Marciello (Germany) Luca Stolz	Mercedes-AMG M159 6.2 L V8	745	+62 Laps
24	GTD	1	(United States) Paul Miller Racing	(Italy) Andrea Caldarelli (United States) Corey Lewis (United States) Bryan Sellers (United States) Madison Snow	Lamborghini Huracán GT3 Evo	745	+62 Laps
24	GTD	1	(United States) Paul Miller Racing	(Italy) Andrea Caldarelli (United States) Corey Lewis (United States) Bryan Sellers (United States) Madison Snow	Lamborghini 5.2 L V10	745	+62 Laps
25	GTD	16	(United States) Wright Motorsports	(Austria) Klaus Bachler (Belgium) Jan Heylen (United States) Trent Hindman (United States) Patrick Long	Porsche 911 GT3 R	745	+62 Laps
25	GTD	16	(United States) Wright Motorsports	(Austria) Klaus Bachler (Belgium) Jan Heylen (United States) Trent Hindman (United States) Patrick Long	Porsche 4.0 L Flat-6	745	+62 Laps
26	GTD	23	(United States) Heart of Racing Team	(Canada) Roman De Angelis (United Kingdom) Ross Gunn (United Kingdom) Ian James (United Kingdom) Darren Turner	Aston Martin Vantage AMR GT3	745	+62 Laps
26	GTD	23	(United States) Heart of Racing Team	(Canada) Roman De Angelis (United Kingdom) Ross Gunn (United Kingdom) Ian James (United Kingdom) Darren Turner	Aston Martin 4.0 L Turbo V8	745	+62 Laps
27	GTD	96	(United States) Turner Motorsport	(United States) Bill Auberlen (United States) Robby Foley (United States) Colton Herta (Australia) Aidan Read	BMW M6 GT3	744	+63 Laps
27	GTD	96	(United States) Turner Motorsport	(United States) Bill Auberlen (United States) Robby Foley (United States) Colton Herta (Australia) Aidan Read	BMW 4.4 L Turbo V8	744	+63 Laps
28	GTD	97	(United Kingdom) TF Sport	(Republic of Ireland) Charlie Eastwood (United States) Ben Keating (United States) Max Root (United Kingdom) Richard Westbrook	Aston Martin Vantage AMR GT3	744	+63 Laps
28	GTD	97	(United Kingdom) TF Sport	(Republic of Ireland) Charlie Eastwood (United States) Ben Keating (United States) Max Root (United Kingdom) Richard Westbrook	Aston Martin 4.0 L Turbo V8	744	+63 Laps
29	GTD	21	(Italy) AF Corse	(Italy) Matteo Cressoni (Italy) Simon Mann (Denmark) Nicklas Nielsen (Brazil) Daniel Serra	Ferrari 488 GT3 Evo 2020	743	+64 Laps
29	GTD	21	(Italy) AF Corse	(Italy) Matteo Cressoni (Italy) Simon Mann (Denmark) Nicklas Nielsen (Brazil) Daniel Serra	Ferrari F154CB 3.9 L Turbo V8	743	+64 Laps
30	GTD	28	(United States) Alegra Motorsports	(Germany) Maximilian Buhk (United States) Billy Johnson (Canada) Daniel Morad (United States) Mike Skeen	Mercedes-AMG GT3 Evo	741	+66 Laps
30	GTD	28	(United States) Alegra Motorsports	(Germany) Maximilian Buhk (United States) Billy Johnson (Canada) Daniel Morad (United States) Mike Skeen	Mercedes-AMG M159 6.2 L V8	741	+66 Laps
31	LMP3	54	(United States) CORE Autosport	(United States) Jon Bennett (United States) Colin Braun (United States) George Kurtz (United States) Matt McMurry	Ligier JS P320	737	+70 Laps
31	LMP3	54	(United States) CORE Autosport	(United States) Jon Bennett (United States) Colin Braun (United States) George Kurtz (United States) Matt McMurry	Nissan VK56DE 5.6 L V8	737	+70 Laps
32	GTD	88	(United States) Team Hardpoint EBM	(New Zealand) Earl Bamber (United States) Rob Ferriol (United Kingdom) Katherine Legge (Denmark) Christina Nielsen	Porsche 911 GT3 R	737	+70 Laps
32	GTD	88	(United States) Team Hardpoint EBM	(New Zealand) Earl Bamber (United States) Rob Ferriol (United Kingdom) Katherine Legge (Denmark) Christina Nielsen	Porsche 4.0 L Flat-6	737	+70 Laps
33	GTD	44	(United States) Magnus Racing with Archangel Motorsports	(Germany) Mario Farnbacher (United States) Andy Lally (United States) John Potter (United States) Spencer Pumpelly	Acura NSX GT3 Evo	736	+71 Laps
33	GTD	44	(United States) Magnus Racing with Archangel Motorsports	(Germany) Mario Farnbacher (United States) Andy Lally (United States) John Potter (United States) Spencer Pumpelly	Acura 3.5 L Turbo V6	736	+71 Laps
34 DNF	DPi	5	(United States) JDC-Mustang Sampling Racing	(France) Sébastien Bourdais (France) Loïc Duval (France) Tristan Vautier	Cadillac DPi-V.R	723	Accident damage
34 DNF	DPi	5	(United States) JDC-Mustang Sampling Racing	(France) Sébastien Bourdais (France) Loïc Duval (France) Tristan Vautier	Cadillac 5.5 L V8	723	Accident damage
35	LMP2	47	(Italy) Cetilar Racing	(Italy) Andrea Belicchi (Italy) Antonio Fuoco (Italy) Roberto Lacorte (Italy) Giorgio Sernagiotto	Dallara P217	710	+97 Laps
35	LMP2	47	(Italy) Cetilar Racing	(Italy) Andrea Belicchi (Italy) Antonio Fuoco (Italy) Roberto Lacorte (Italy) Giorgio Sernagiotto	Gibson Technology GK428 V8	710	+97 Laps
36	GTD	9	(Canada) Pfaff Motorsports	(Australia) Matt Campbell (Germany) Lars Kern (Canada) Zacharie Robichon (Belgium) Laurens Vanthoor	Porsche 911 GT3 R	702	+105 Laps
36	GTD	9	(Canada) Pfaff Motorsports	(Australia) Matt Campbell (Germany) Lars Kern (Canada) Zacharie Robichon (Belgium) Laurens Vanthoor	Porsche 4.0 L Flat-6	702	+105 Laps
37	LMP3	38	(United States) Performance Tech Motorsports	(Canada) Cameron Cassels (Sweden) Rasmus Lindh (Guatemala) Mateo Llarena (United States) Ayrton Ori	Ligier JS P320	687	+120 Laps
37	LMP3	38	(United States) Performance Tech Motorsports	(Canada) Cameron Cassels (Sweden) Rasmus Lindh (Guatemala) Mateo Llarena (United States) Ayrton Ori	Nissan VK56DE 5.6 L V8	687	+120 Laps
38	GTD	12	(United States) Vasser Sullivan Racing	(United States) Townsend Bell (United States) Robert Megennis (United States) Frankie Montecalvo (United States) Zach Veach	Lexus RC F GT3	681	+126 Laps
38	GTD	12	(United States) Vasser Sullivan Racing	(United States) Townsend Bell (United States) Robert Megennis (United States) Frankie Montecalvo (United States) Zach Veach	Lexus 5.4 L V8	681	+126 Laps
39 DNF	GTD	63	(United States) Scuderia Corsa	(Australia) Ryan Briscoe (United States) Bret Curtis (Brazil) Marcos Gomes (United Arab Emirates) Ed Jones	Ferrari 488 GT3 Evo 2020	676	Overheating
39 DNF	GTD	63	(United States) Scuderia Corsa	(Australia) Ryan Briscoe (United States) Bret Curtis (Brazil) Marcos Gomes (United Arab Emirates) Ed Jones	Ferrari F154CB 3.9 L Turbo V8	676	Overheating
40 DNF	GTD	42	(United States) NTE Sport	(United States) Andrew Davis (United States) J. R. Hildebrand (United States) Alan Metni (United States) Don Yount	Audi R8 LMS Evo	665	Gearbox
40 DNF	GTD	42	(United States) NTE Sport	(United States) Andrew Davis (United States) J. R. Hildebrand (United States) Alan Metni (United States) Don Yount	Audi BXA 5.2 L V10	665	Gearbox
41 DNF	LMP2	52	(United States) PR1/Mathiasen Motorsports	(United States) Scott Huffaker (Denmark) Mikkel Jensen (United States) Ben Keating (France) Nicolas Lapierre	Oreca 07	664	Starter motor
41 DNF	LMP2	52	(United States) PR1/Mathiasen Motorsports	(United States) Scott Huffaker (Denmark) Mikkel Jensen (United States) Ben Keating (France) Nicolas Lapierre	Gibson Technology GK428 V8	664	Starter motor
42 DNF	GTD	14	(United States) Vasser Sullivan Racing	(United Kingdom) Oliver Gavin (United Kingdom) Jack Hawksworth (United States) Kyle Kirkwood (United States) Aaron Telitz	Lexus RC F GT3	641	Mechanical
42 DNF	GTD	14	(United States) Vasser Sullivan Racing	(United Kingdom) Oliver Gavin (United Kingdom) Jack Hawksworth (United States) Kyle Kirkwood (United States) Aaron Telitz	Lexus 5.4 L V8	641	Mechanical
43 DNF	GTD	64	(United States) Team TGM	(United States) Ted Giovanis (United States) Hugh Plumb (United States) Matt Plumb (United States) Owen Trinkler	Porsche 911 GT3 R	515	Drivetrain
43 DNF	GTD	64	(United States) Team TGM	(United States) Ted Giovanis (United States) Hugh Plumb (United States) Matt Plumb (United States) Owen Trinkler	Porsche 4.0 L Flat-6	515	Drivetrain
44 DNF	LMP3	7	(United States) Forty7 Motorsports	(Colombia) Gabby Chaves (United States) Trenton Estep (United States) Mark Kvamme (United States) Ryan Norman	Duqueine M30 - D-08	413	Oil cooling pump
44 DNF	LMP3	7	(United States) Forty7 Motorsports	(Colombia) Gabby Chaves (United States) Trenton Estep (United States) Mark Kvamme (United States) Ryan Norman	Nissan VK56DE 5.6 L V8	413	Oil cooling pump
45 DNF	GTD	111	(Austria) GRT Grasser Racing Team	(Italy) Mirko Bortolotti (Switzerland) Rolf Ineichen (Italy) Marco Mapelli (Netherlands) Steijn Schothorst	Lamborghini Huracán GT3 Evo	347	Electrical
45 DNF	GTD	111	(Austria) GRT Grasser Racing Team	(Italy) Mirko Bortolotti (Switzerland) Rolf Ineichen (Italy) Marco Mapelli (Netherlands) Steijn Schothorst	Lamborghini 5.2 L V10	347	Electrical
46 DNF	GTD	19	(Austria) GRT Grasser Racing Team	(Spain) Albert Costa (Canada) Misha Goikhberg (France) Franck Perera (Germany) Tim Zimmermann	Lamborghini Huracán GT3 Evo	195	Engine
46 DNF	GTD	19	(Austria) GRT Grasser Racing Team	(Spain) Albert Costa (Canada) Misha Goikhberg (France) Franck Perera (Germany) Tim Zimmermann	Lamborghini 5.2 L V10	195	Engine
47 DNF	LMP2	29	(Netherlands) Racing Team Nederland	(Netherlands) Frits van Eerd (Netherlands) Giedo van der Garde (France) Charles Milesi (Netherlands) Job van Uitert	Oreca 07	64	Gearbox
47 DNF	LMP2	29	(Netherlands) Racing Team Nederland	(Netherlands) Frits van Eerd (Netherlands) Giedo van der Garde (France) Charles Milesi (Netherlands) Job van Uitert	Gibson Technology GK428 V8	64	Gearbox
48 DNF	LMP2	20	(Denmark) High Class Racing	(Denmark) Dennis Andersen (Denmark) Anders Fjordbach (Austria) Ferdinand Habsburg-Lothringen (Poland) Robert Kubica	Oreca 07	56	Gearbox
48 DNF	LMP2	20	(Denmark) High Class Racing	(Denmark) Dennis Andersen (Denmark) Anders Fjordbach (Austria) Ferdinand Habsburg-Lothringen (Poland) Robert Kubica	Gibson Technology GK428 V8	56	Gearbox
49 DNF	LMP2	81	(United States) DragonSpeed USA LLC	(Canada) Garett Grist (United Kingdom) Ben Hanley (United States) Rob Hodes (Netherlands) Rinus VeeKay	Oreca 07	53	Misfire
49 DNF	LMP2	81	(United States) DragonSpeed USA LLC	(Canada) Garett Grist (United Kingdom) Ben Hanley (United States) Rob Hodes (Netherlands) Rinus VeeKay	Gibson Technology GK428 V8	53	Misfire
Box Score

== Standings after the race ==
DPi Drivers' Championship standings
Pos.	Driver	Points
1	(Portugal) Filipe Albuquerque (Brazil) Hélio Castroneves (United States) Alexander Rossi (United States) Ricky Taylor	376
2	(United States) Jimmie Johnson (Japan) Kamui Kobayashi (France) Simon Pagenaud (Germany) Mike Rockenfeller	345
3	(United States) Jonathan Bomarito (United Kingdom) Oliver Jarvis (United Kingdom) Harry Tincknell	332
4	(United States) A. J. Allmendinger (United States) Dane Cameron (Colombia) Juan Pablo Montoya (France) Olivier Pla	308
5	(United Kingdom) Mike Conway (Brazil) Pipo Derani (United States) Chase Elliott (Brazil) Felipe Nasr	285

LMP2 Drivers' Championship standings
Pos.	Driver	Points
1	(United Kingdom) Ryan Dalziel (United States) Dwight Merriman (France) Paul-Loup Chatin (United Kingdom) Kyle Tilley	0‡
2	(France) Gabriel Aubry (Canada) John Farano (France) Timothé Buret (France) Matthieu Vaxivière	0‡
3	(Canada) Devlin DeFrancesco (United States) Eric Lux (Germany) Christopher Mies (Germany) Fabian Schiller	0‡
4	(United States) Ben Keating (United States) Austin Dillon (Germany) Sven Müller (United States) Cody Ware (Turkey) Salih Yoluç	0‡
5	(United States) Tristan Nunez (United States) Steven Thomas (United Kingdom) Matthew Bell (United States) Thomas Merrill	0‡

LMP3 Drivers' Championship standings
Pos.	Driver	Points
1	(Australia) Scott Andrews (United States) Oliver Askew (United States) Spencer Pigot (United States) Gar Robinson	0‡
2	(Portugal) João Barbosa (United Kingdom) Wayne Boyd (France) Yann Clairay (United States) Lance Willsey	0‡
3	(Germany) Laurents Hörr (United States) Kenton Koch (Germany) Moritz Kranz (United Kingdom) Stevan McAleer	0‡
4	(Netherlands) Jeroen Bleekemolen (United States) Jim Cox (United States) Austin McCusker (United States) Dylan Murry	0‡
5	(United States) Jon Bennett (United States) Colin Braun (United States) George Kurtz (United States) Matt McMurry	0‡

GTLM Drivers' Championship standings
Pos.	Driver	Points
1	(Netherlands) Nicky Catsburg (Spain) Antonio García (United States) Jordan Taylor	382
2	(United States) Tommy Milner (United Kingdom) Alexander Sims (United Kingdom) Nick Tandy	355
3	(United States) John Edwards (Brazil) Augusto Farfus (Finland) Jesse Krohn (Germany) Marco Wittmann	325
4	(United Kingdom) James Calado (France) Jules Gounon (Italy) Alessandro Pier Guidi (Italy) Davide Rigon	308
5	(United States) Connor De Phillippi (Austria) Philipp Eng (Germany) Timo Glock (Canada) Bruno Spengler	286

GTD Drivers' Championship standings
Pos.	Driver	Points
1	(Netherlands) Indy Dontje (United Kingdom) Philip Ellis (Germany) Maro Engel (United States) Russell Ward	376
2	(Canada) Mikaël Grenier (Australia) Kenny Habul (Italy) Raffaele Marciello (Germany) Luca Stolz	341
3	(Italy) Andrea Caldarelli (United States) Corey Lewis (United States) Madison Snow (United States) Bryan Sellers	314
4	(Austria) Klaus Bachler (Belgium) Jan Heylen (United States) Trent Hindman (United States) Patrick Long	303
5	(Canada) Roman De Angelis (United Kingdom) Ross Gunn (United Kingdom) Ian James (United Kingdom) Darren Turner	285

- Note: Only the top five positions are included for all sets of standings.
- ‡: Points only awarded towards Michelin Endurance Cup championship.

DPi Teams' Championship standings
Pos.	Team	Points
1	(United States) #10 WTR-Konica Minolta Acura	376
2	(United States) #48 Ally Cadillac Racing	345
3	(Canada) #55 Mazda Motorsports	332
4	(United States) #60 Meyer Shank Racing w/ Curb-Agajanian	308
5	(United States) #31 Whelen Engineering Racing	285

LMP2 Teams' Championship standings
Pos.	Team	Points
1	(United States) #18 Era Motorsport with IDEC Sport	0‡
2	(United States) #8 Tower Motorsport	0‡
3	(United States) #82 DragonSpeed USA	0‡
4	(Philippines) #51 RWR-Eurasia	0‡
5	(United States) #11 WIN Autosport	0‡

LMP3 Teams' Championship standings
Pos.	Team	Points
1	(United States) #74 Riley Motorsports	0‡
2	(United States) #33 Sean Creech Motorsport	0‡
3	(Belgium) #6 Mühlner Motorsports America	0‡
4	(United States) #91 Riley Motorsports	0‡
5	(United States) #54 CORE Autosport	0‡

GTLM Teams' Championship standings
Pos.	Team	Points
1	(United States) #3 Corvette Racing	382
2	(United States) #4 Corvette Racing	355
3	(United States) #24 BMW Team RLL	325
4	(United States) #62 Risi Competizione	308
5	(United States) #25 BMW Team RLL	296

GTD Teams' Championship standings
Pos.	Team	Points
1	(United States) #57 Winward Racing	376
2	(Australia) #75 SunEnergy1 Racing	341
3	(United States) #1 Paul Miller Racing	314
4	(United States) #16 Wright Motorsports	303
5	(United States) #96 Turner Motorsport	285

- Note: Only the top five positions are included for all sets of standings.
- ‡: Points only awarded towards Michelin Endurance Cup championship.

DPi Manufacturers' Championship standings
Pos.	Manufacturer	Points
1	(Japan) Acura	380
2	(United States) Cadillac	355
3	(Japan) Mazda	332

GTLM Manufacturers' Championship standings
Pos.	Manufacturer	Points
1	(United States) Chevrolet	385
2	(Germany) BMW	348
3	(Italy) Ferrari	330
4	(Germany) Porsche	312

GTD Manufacturers' Championship standings
Pos.	Manufacturer	Points
1	(Germany) Mercedes-AMG	376
2	(Italy) Lamborghini	350
3	(Germany) Porsche	332
4	(United Kingdom) Aston Martin	305
5	(Germany) BMW	295

- Note: Only the top five positions are included for all sets of standings.

IMSA SportsCar Championship
Previous race: None	2021 season	Next race: 2021 12 Hours of Sebring
