= 2023 Chevrolet Grand Prix =

Sixth round of the 2023 IMSA SportsCar Championship season

The Canadian Tire Motorsports Park

The 2023 Chevrolet Grand Prix was a sports car race sanctioned by the International Motor Sports Association (IMSA). The race was held at Canadian Tire Motorsports Park in Bowmanville, Ontario, Canada on July 9, 2023. The race was the sixth round of the 2023 IMSA SportsCar Championship, and the third round of the 2023 WeatherTech Sprint Cup.

== Background ==
International Motor Sports Association's (IMSA) president John Doonan confirmed the race was part of the schedule for the 2023 IMSA SportsCar Championship (IMSA SCC) in August 2022. It was the eighth year the event was held as part of the WeatherTech SportsCar Championship and the fortieth annual running of the race. The 2023 Chevrolet Grand Prix was the sixth of eleven scheduled sports car races of 2023 by IMSA, and the third of seven races of the WeatherTech Sprint Cup. The race was held at the ten-turn 2.459 mi (3.957 km) Canadian Tire Motorsports Park on July 9, 2023.

After the Sahlen's Six Hours of The Glen two weeks earlier, Pipo Derani and Alexander Sims led the GTP Drivers' Championship with 1602 points, ahead of Connor De Phillippi and Nick Yelloly with 1583 points followed by Nick Tandy and Mathieu Jaminet with 1527 points. With 730 points, Josh Burdon, Felipe Fraga, and Gar Robinson led the LMP3 Drivers' Championship ahead of Wayne Boyd, Anthony Mantella, and Nicolás Varrone with 606 points. Ben Barnicoat and Jack Hawksworth led the GTD Pro Drivers' Championship with 1795 points ahead of Jules Gounon and Daniel Juncadella with 1682 points. In GTD, the Drivers' Championship was led by Bryan Sellers and Madison Snow with 1592 points, ahead of Frankie Montecalvo and Aaron Telitz with 1488 points. Cadillac, Lexus, and BMW were leading their respective Manufacturers' Championships, while Whelen Engineering Racing, Riley Motorsports, Vasser Sullivan Racing, and Paul Miller Racing each led their own Teams' Championships.

On July 4, 2023, IMSA released the latest technical bulletin outlining Balance of Performance for the GTP, GTD Pro, and GTD classes. In GTP, all of the cars received weight breaks. The Acura ran at 1046 kg, the BMW ran at 1031 kg, the Cadillac ran at 1030 kg, and the Porsche ran at 1037 kg. Maximum stint energy figures were also adjusted. In GTD Pro and GTD, the Acura, Corvette, McLaren, Mercedes, and Porsche received power increases as well as fuel capacity increases.

=== Entries ===
A total of 34 cars took part in the event split across four classes. 9 cars were entered in GTP, 6 in LMP3, 5 in GTD Pro, and 14 in GTD.

In LMP3, Andretti Autosport, Performance Tech Motorsports, MLT Motorsports, and JDC-Miller MotorSports were absent. Antoine Comeau and George Staikos shared the Ave Motorsports entry.

In GTD Pro, AF Corse, Risi Competizione and Iron Lynx were absent. In GTD, Triarsi Competizione, NTE Sport, Magnus Racing, Cetilar Racing, Iron Dames, and Racer's Edge Motorsports with WTR Andretti skipped.

== Practice ==
There were two practice sessions preceding the start of the race on Sunday, one on Friday and one on Saturday. The first session lasted 90 minutes on Friday while the second session on Saturday lasted 105 minutes.

=== Practice 1 ===
The first practice session took place at 2:50 pm ET on Friday and ended with Colin Braun topping the charts for Meyer Shank Racing with Curb-Agajanian, with a lap time of 1:07.341. The LMP3 class was topped by the #30 Jr III Motorsports Ligier JS P320 of Garett Grist with a time of 1:12.270. Antonio García was fastest in GTD Pro while Frankie Montecalvo set the fastest time amongst all GTD cars.

Pos.	Class	No.	Team	Driver	Time	Gap
1	GTP	60	Meyer Shank Racing with Curb-Agajanian	Colin Braun	1:07.341	_
2	GTP	31	Whelen Engineering Racing	Pipo Derani	1:08.121	+0.780
3	GTP	10	Wayne Taylor Racing with Andretti Autosport	Filipe Albuquerque	1:08.138	+0.797

=== Final Practice ===
The second and final practice session took place at 8:00 am ET on Saturday and ended with Ricky Taylor topping the charts for Wayne Taylor Racing with Andretti Autosport, with a lap time of 1:05.870. Garett Grist set the fastest time in LMP3. The GTD Pro class was topped by the #14 Vasser Sullivan Racing Lexus RC F GT3 of Jack Hawksworth while Loris Spinelli was fastest in GTD.

Pos.	Class	No.	Team	Driver	Time	Gap
1	GTP	10	Wayne Taylor Racing with Andretti Autosport	Ricky Taylor	1:05.870	_
2	GTP	60	Meyer Shank Racing with Curb-Agajanian	Tom Blomqvist	1:06.138	+0.268
3	GTP	7	Porsche Penske Motorsport	Felipe Nasr	1:06.738	+0.868

== Qualifying ==
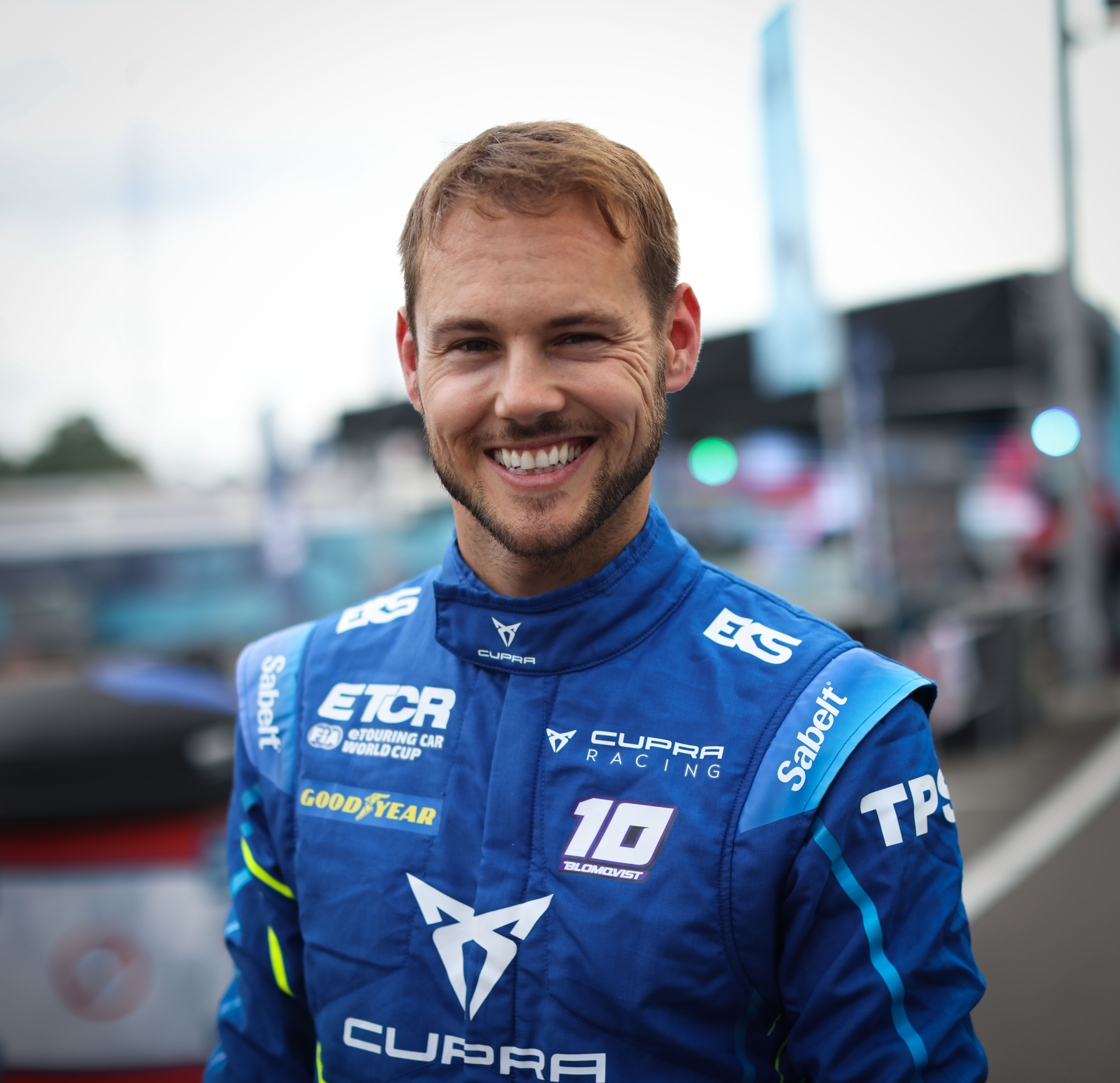
Tom Blomqvist (pictured in 2022) helped take the No. 60 Meyer Shank Racing Acura's second pole position of 2023.

Saturday's afternoon qualifying was broken into three sessions, with one session for the GTP, LMP3, and GTD Pro and GTD classes, which lasted for 20 minutes for the GTP session, and 15 minutes for the LMP3, and GTD Pro/GTD sessions. The rules dictated that all teams nominated a driver to qualify their cars, with the Pro-Am LMP3 class requiring a Bronze/Silver Rated driver to qualify the car. The competitors' fastest lap times determined the starting order. IMSA then arranged the grid to put GTPs ahead of the LMP3, GTD Pro, and GTD cars.

The first was cars in the GTD Pro and GTD classes. Jack Hawksworth qualified on pole in GTD Pro driving the No. 14 Vasser Sullivan Racing entry. Roman De Angelis qualified on pole in GTD driving the No. 27 Heart of Racing Team, besting Frankie Montecalvo in the No. 12 Vasser Sullivan Racing entry.

The second session of qualifying was for cars in the LMP3 class. Gar Robinson qualified on pole for the class driving the No. 74 car for Riley Motorsports, besting Orey Fidani in the No. 13 AWA entry.

The final session of qualifying was for the GTP class. Tom Blomqvist qualified on pole driving the No. 60 car for Meyer Shank Racing, beating Ricky Taylor in the No. 10 Wayne Taylor Racing with Andretti Autosport entry by less than one tenth of a second.

=== Qualifying results ===
Pole positions in each class are indicated in bold and by ‡.

Pos.	Class	No.	Team	Driver	Time	Gap	Grid
1	**GTP**	**60**	**(United States) Meyer Shank Racing with Curb-Agajanian**	**(United Kingdom) Tom Blomqvist**	**1:05.653**	**_**	1‡
2	GTP	10	(United States) Wayne Taylor Racing with Andretti Autosport	(United States) Ricky Taylor	1:05.734	+0.071	2
3	GTP	31	(United States) Whelen Engineering Racing	(Brazil) Pipo Derani	1:05.829	+0.176	3
4	GTP	01	(United States) Cadillac Racing	(France) Sébastien Bourdais	1:06.266	+0.613	4
5	GTP	7	(Germany) Porsche Penske Motorsport	(Brazil) Felipe Nasr	1:06.521	+0.868	5
6	GTP	24	(United States) BMW M Team RLL	(Brazil) Augusto Farfus	1:06.801	+1.148	6
7	GTP	25	(United States) BMW M Team RLL	(United Kingdom) Nick Yelloly	1:06.848	+1.195	7
8	GTP	5	(United States) JDC-Miller MotorSports	(Germany) Mike Rockenfeller	1:06.946	+1.293	8
9	GTP	6	(Germany) Porsche Penske Motorsport	(France) Mathieu Jaminet	1:07.329	+1.676	9
10	**LMP3**	**74**	**(United States) Riley Motorsports**	**(United States) Gar Robinson**	**1:12.946**	**+7.293**	10‡
11	LMP3	13	(Canada) AWA	(Canada) Orey Fidani	1:13.355	+7.702	11
12	LMP3	30	(United States) Jr III Motorsports	(United States) Ari Balogh	1:13.593	+7.940	12
13	LMP3	17	(Canada) AWA	(Canada) Anthony Mantella	1:13.682	+8.029	13
14	LMP3	4	(United States) Ave Motorsports	(Canada) Antoine Comeau	1:13.884	+8.231	14
15	LMP3	33	(United States) Sean Creech Motorsport	(United States) Lance Willsey	1:14.751	+9.098	15
16	**GTD Pro**	**14**	**(United States) Vasser Sullivan Racing**	**(United Kingdom) Jack Hawksworth**	**1:15.029**	**+9.376**	16‡
17	GTD Pro	79	(United States) WeatherTech Racing	(Andorra) Jules Gounon	1:15.103	+9.450	17
18	GTD Pro	23	(United States) Heart of Racing Team	(Spain) Alex Riberas	1:15.341	+9.688	18
19	**GTD**	**27**	**(United States) Heart of Racing Team**	**(Canada) Roman De Angelis**	**1:15.478**	**+9.825**	19‡
20	GTD Pro	3	(United States) Corvette Racing	(United States) Jordan Taylor	1:15.494	+9.841	20
21	GTD	12	(United States) Vasser Sullivan Racing	(United States) Frankie Montecalvo	1:15.508	+9.855	34^{1}
22	GTD Pro	9	(Canada) Pfaff Motorsports	(Austria) Klaus Bachler	1:15.584	+9.931	21
23	GTD	1	(United States) Paul Miller Racing	(United States) Madison Snow	1:15.595	+9.941	22
24	GTD	32	(United States) Team Korthoff Motorsports	(Canada) Mikaël Grenier	1:15.670	+10.017	23
25	GTD	96	(United States) Turner Motorsport	(United States) Patrick Gallagher	1:15.992	+10.339	24
26	GTD	78	(United States) Forte Racing powered by US RaceTronics	(Canada) Misha Goikhberg	1:16.100	+10.447	25
27	GTD	57	(United States) Winward Racing	(United States) Russell Ward	1:16.165	+10.512	26
28	GTD	97	(United States) Turner Motorsport	(United States) Chandler Hull	1:16.196	+10.543	27
29	GTD	70	(United Kingdom) Inception Racing	(United States) Brendan Iribe	1:16.360	+10.707	28
30	GTD	80	(United States) AO Racing Team	(United States) P.J. Hyett	1:16.983	+11.330	29
31	GTD	77	(United States) Wright Motorsports	(United States) Alan Brynjolfsson	1:17.028	+11.375	30
32	GTD	91	(United States) Kelly-Moss with Riley	(United States) Alan Metni	1:17.126	+11.473	31
33	GTD	66	(United States) Gradient Racing	(United States) Sheena Monk	1:17.213	+11.560	32
34	GTD	92	(United States) Kelly-Moss with Riley	(United States) David Brule	1:20.469	+14.816	33
Sources:

- ^{1} The No. 12 Vasser Sullivan Racing entry initially qualified second for the GTD class. However, the team changed engines after qualifying. By IMSA rules, the entry was moved to the rear of the GTD field on the starting grid.

== Race ==
=== Post-race ===
The result kept Derani and Sims atop the GTP Drivers' Championship, 20 points ahead of third-place finishers De Phillippi and Yelloly. Albuquerque and Taylor advanced from fifth to third. Fraga, and Robinson extended their advantage in the LMP3 Drivers' Championship over Boyd, and Mantella to 181 points. The result kept Barnicoat and Hawksworth atop the GTD Pro Drivers' Championship. In the GTD Drivers' Championship, Sellers and Snow extended their points lead to 212 points while Grenier and Skeen advanced from eleventh to fifth. Cadillac, Lexus, and BMW continued to top their respective Manufacturers' Championships, while Whelen Engineering Racing, Riley Motorsports, Vasser Sullivan Racing, and Paul Miller Racing kept their respective advantages in their respective of Teams' Championships with five races left in the season.

Class winners are in bold and ‡.

Pos	Class	No	Team	Drivers	Chassis	Laps	Time/Retired
Pos	Class	No	Team	Drivers	Engine	Laps	Time/Retired
1	**GTP**	**60**	**(United States) Meyer Shank Racing with Curb-Agajanian**	**(United Kingdom) Tom Blomqvist (United States) Colin Braun**	**Acura ARX-06**	**120**	**2:41:01.603‡**
1	**GTP**	**60**	**(United States) Meyer Shank Racing with Curb-Agajanian**	**(United Kingdom) Tom Blomqvist (United States) Colin Braun**	**Acura AR24e 2.4 L Turbo V6**	**120**	**2:41:01.603‡**
2	GTP	10	(United States) Wayne Taylor Racing with Andretti Autosport	(Portugal) Filipe Albuquerque (United States) Ricky Taylor	Acura ARX-06	120	+9.157
2	GTP	10	(United States) Wayne Taylor Racing with Andretti Autosport	(Portugal) Filipe Albuquerque (United States) Ricky Taylor	Acura AR24e 2.4 L Turbo V6	120	+9.157
3	GTP	25	(United States) BMW M Team RLL	(United States) Connor De Phillippi (United Kingdom) Nick Yelloly	BMW M Hybrid V8	120	+18.565
3	GTP	25	(United States) BMW M Team RLL	(United States) Connor De Phillippi (United Kingdom) Nick Yelloly	BMW P66/3 4.0 L Turbo V8	120	+18.565
4	GTP	5	(United States) JDC-Miller MotorSports	(Germany) Mike Rockenfeller (Netherlands) Tijmen van der Helm	Porsche 963	120	+19.531
4	GTP	5	(United States) JDC-Miller MotorSports	(Germany) Mike Rockenfeller (Netherlands) Tijmen van der Helm	Porsche 9RD 4.6 L Turbo V8	120	+19.531
5	GTP	6	(Germany) Porsche Penske Motorsport	(France) Mathieu Jaminet (United Kingdom) Nick Tandy	Porsche 963	120	+20.640
5	GTP	6	(Germany) Porsche Penske Motorsport	(France) Mathieu Jaminet (United Kingdom) Nick Tandy	Porsche 9RD 4.6 L Turbo V8	120	+20.640
6	GTP	7	(Germany) Porsche Penske Motorsport	(Australia) Matt Campbell (Brazil) Felipe Nasr	Porsche 963	120	+22.402
6	GTP	7	(Germany) Porsche Penske Motorsport	(Australia) Matt Campbell (Brazil) Felipe Nasr	Porsche 9RD 4.6 L Turbo V8	120	+22.402
7	GTP	31	(United States) Whelen Engineering Racing	(Brazil) Pipo Derani (United Kingdom) Alexander Sims	Cadillac V-Series.R	120	+23.883
7	GTP	31	(United States) Whelen Engineering Racing	(Brazil) Pipo Derani (United Kingdom) Alexander Sims	Cadillac LMC55R 5.5 L V8	120	+23.883
8	GTP	24	(United States) BMW M Team RLL	(Austria) Philipp Eng (Brazil) Augusto Farfus	BMW M Hybrid V8	120	+54.373
8	GTP	24	(United States) BMW M Team RLL	(Austria) Philipp Eng (Brazil) Augusto Farfus	BMW P66/3 4.0 L Turbo V8	120	+54.373
9	GTP	01	(United States) Cadillac Racing	(France) Sébastien Bourdais (Netherlands) Renger van der Zande	Cadillac V-Series.R	117	Crash
9	GTP	01	(United States) Cadillac Racing	(France) Sébastien Bourdais (Netherlands) Renger van der Zande	Cadillac LMC55R 5.5 L V8	117	Crash
10	**LMP3**	**74**	**(United States) Riley Motorsports**	**(Brazil) Felipe Fraga (United States) Gar Robinson**	**Ligier JS P320**	**113**	**+7 Laps‡**
10	**LMP3**	**74**	**(United States) Riley Motorsports**	**(Brazil) Felipe Fraga (United States) Gar Robinson**	**Nissan VK56DE 5.6L V8 engine**	**113**	**+7 Laps‡**
11	LMP3	30	(United States) Jr III Motorsports	(United States) Ari Balogh (Canada) Garett Grist	Ligier JS P320	113	+7 Laps
11	LMP3	30	(United States) Jr III Motorsports	(United States) Ari Balogh (Canada) Garett Grist	Nissan VK56DE 5.6L V8 engine	113	+7 Laps
12	LMP3	17	(Canada) AWA	(United Kingdom) Wayne Boyd (Canada) Anthony Mantella	Duqueine M30 - D08	113	+7 Laps
12	LMP3	17	(Canada) AWA	(United Kingdom) Wayne Boyd (Canada) Anthony Mantella	Nissan VK56DE 5.6L V8 engine	113	+7 Laps
13	LMP3	13	(Canada) AWA	(United Kingdom) Matt Bell (Canada) Orey Fidani	Duqueine M30 - D08	113	+7 Laps
13	LMP3	13	(Canada) AWA	(United Kingdom) Matt Bell (Canada) Orey Fidani	Nissan VK56DE 5.6L V8 engine	113	+7 Laps
14	LMP3	33	(United States) Sean Creech Motorsport	(Portugal) João Barbosa (United States) Lance Willsey	Ligier JS P320	113	+7 Laps
14	LMP3	33	(United States) Sean Creech Motorsport	(Portugal) João Barbosa (United States) Lance Willsey	Nissan VK56DE 5.6L V8 engine	113	+7 Laps
15	**GTD Pro**	**3**	**(United States) Corvette Racing**	**(Spain) Antonio García** **(United States) Jordan Taylor**	**Chevrolet Corvette C8.R GTD**	111	**+9 Laps‡**
15	**GTD Pro**	**3**	**(United States) Corvette Racing**	**(Spain) Antonio García** **(United States) Jordan Taylor**	**Chevrolet 5.5 L V8**	111	**+9 Laps‡**
16	GTD Pro	9	(Canada) Pfaff Motorsports	(Austria) Klaus Bachler (France) Patrick Pilet	Porsche 911 GT3 R (992)	111	+9 Laps
16	GTD Pro	9	(Canada) Pfaff Motorsports	(Austria) Klaus Bachler (France) Patrick Pilet	Porsche 4.2 L Flat-6	111	+9 Laps
17	**GTD**	**1**	**(United States) Paul Miller Racing**	**(United States) Bryan Sellers** **(United States) Madison Snow**	**BMW M4 GT3**	111	**+9 Laps‡**
17	**GTD**	**1**	**(United States) Paul Miller Racing**	**(United States) Bryan Sellers** **(United States) Madison Snow**	**BMW S58B30T0 3.0 L Turbo I6**	111	**+9 Laps‡**
18	GTD	70	(United Kingdom) Inception Racing	(United States) Brendan Iribe (Denmark) Frederik Schandorff	McLaren 720S GT3 Evo	111	+9 Laps
18	GTD	70	(United Kingdom) Inception Racing	(United States) Brendan Iribe (Denmark) Frederik Schandorff	McLaren M840T 4.0 L Turbo V8	111	+9 Laps
19	GTD Pro	79	(United States) WeatherTech Racing	(Andorra) Jules Gounon (Spain) Daniel Juncadella	Mercedes-AMG GT3 Evo	111	+9 Laps
19	GTD Pro	79	(United States) WeatherTech Racing	(Andorra) Jules Gounon (Spain) Daniel Juncadella	Mercedes-AMG M159 6.2 L V8	111	+9 Laps
20	GTD	32	(United States) Team Korthoff Motorsports	(Canada) Mikaël Grenier (United States) Mike Skeen	Mercedes-AMG GT3 Evo	111	+9 Laps
20	GTD	32	(United States) Team Korthoff Motorsports	(Canada) Mikaël Grenier (United States) Mike Skeen	Mercedes-AMG M159 6.2 L V8	111	+9 Laps
21	GTD	27	(United States) Heart of Racing Team	(Canada) Roman De Angelis (Denmark) Marco Sørensen	Aston Martin Vantage AMR GT3	111	+9 Laps
21	GTD	27	(United States) Heart of Racing Team	(Canada) Roman De Angelis (Denmark) Marco Sørensen	Aston Martin 4.0 L Turbo V8	111	+9 Laps
22	GTD	97	(United States) Turner Motorsport	(United States) Bill Auberlen (United States) Chandler Hull	BMW M4 GT3	110	+10 Laps
22	GTD	97	(United States) Turner Motorsport	(United States) Bill Auberlen (United States) Chandler Hull	BMW S58B30T0 3.0 L Turbo I6	110	+10 Laps
23	GTD	12	(United States) Vasser Sullivan Racing	(United States) Frankie Montecalvo (United States) Aaron Telitz	Lexus RC F GT3	110	+10 Laps
23	GTD	12	(United States) Vasser Sullivan Racing	(United States) Frankie Montecalvo (United States) Aaron Telitz	Toyota 2UR 5.0 L V8	110	+10 Laps
24	GTD	77	(United States) Wright Motorsports	(United States) Alan Brynjolfsson (United States) Trent Hindman	Porsche 911 GT3 R (992)	110	+10 Laps
24	GTD	77	(United States) Wright Motorsports	(United States) Alan Brynjolfsson (United States) Trent Hindman	Porsche 4.2 L Flat-6	110	+10 Laps
25	GTD	80	(United States) AO Racing Team	(United States) P.J. Hyett (United Kingdom) Sebastian Priaulx	Porsche 911 GT3 R (992)	110	+10 Laps
25	GTD	80	(United States) AO Racing Team	(United States) P.J. Hyett (United Kingdom) Sebastian Priaulx	Porsche 4.2 L Flat-6	110	+10 Laps
26	GTD	91	(United States) Kelly-Moss with Riley	(Netherlands) Kay van Berlo (United States) Alan Metni	Porsche 911 GT3 R (992)	110	+10 Laps
26	GTD	91	(United States) Kelly-Moss with Riley	(Netherlands) Kay van Berlo (United States) Alan Metni	Porsche 4.2 L Flat-6	110	+10 Laps
27	LMP3	4	(United States) Ave Motorsports	(Canada) Antoine Comeau (Canada) George Staikos	Ligier JS P320	110	+10 Laps
27	LMP3	4	(United States) Ave Motorsports	(Canada) Antoine Comeau (Canada) George Staikos	Nissan VK56DE 5.6L V8 engine	110	+10 Laps
28	GTD	57	(United States) Winward Racing	(United Kingdom) Philip Ellis (United States) Russell Ward	Mercedes-AMG GT3 Evo	110	+10 Laps
28	GTD	57	(United States) Winward Racing	(United Kingdom) Philip Ellis (United States) Russell Ward	Mercedes-AMG M159 6.2 L V8	110	+10 Laps
29	GTD	66	(United States) Gradient Racing	(United Kingdom) Katherine Legge (United States) Sheena Monk	Acura NSX GT3 Evo22	103	+17 Laps
29	GTD	66	(United States) Gradient Racing	(United Kingdom) Katherine Legge (United States) Sheena Monk	Acura 3.5 L Turbo V6	103	+17 Laps
30	GTD	92	(United States) Kelly-Moss with Riley	(United States) David Brule (United States) Alec Udell	Porsche 911 GT3 R (992)	103	+17 Laps
30	GTD	92	(United States) Kelly-Moss with Riley	(United States) David Brule (United States) Alec Udell	Porsche 4.2 L Flat-6	103	+17 Laps
31	GTD Pro	14	(United States) Vasser Sullivan Racing	(United Kingdom) Ben Barnicoat (United Kingdom) Jack Hawksworth	Lexus RC F GT3	89	+31 Laps
31	GTD Pro	14	(United States) Vasser Sullivan Racing	(United Kingdom) Ben Barnicoat (United Kingdom) Jack Hawksworth	Toyota 2UR 5.0 L V8	89	+31 Laps
32 DNF	GTD	96	(United States) Turner Motorsport	(United States) Robby Foley (United States) Patrick Gallagher	BMW M4 GT3	86	Collision
32 DNF	GTD	96	(United States) Turner Motorsport	(United States) Robby Foley (United States) Patrick Gallagher	BMW S58B30T0 3.0 L Turbo I6	86	Collision
33	GTD	78	(United States) Forte Racing powered by US RaceTronics	(Canada) Misha Goikhberg (Italy) Loris Spinelli	Lamborghini Huracán GT3 Evo 2	82	+38 Laps
33	GTD	78	(United States) Forte Racing powered by US RaceTronics	(Canada) Misha Goikhberg (Italy) Loris Spinelli	Lamborghini 5.2 L V10	82	+38 Laps
34 DNF	GTD Pro	23	(United States) Heart of Racing Team	(United Kingdom) Ross Gunn (Spain) Alex Riberas	Aston Martin Vantage AMR GT3	58	Accident
34 DNF	GTD Pro	23	(United States) Heart of Racing Team	(United Kingdom) Ross Gunn (Spain) Alex Riberas	Aston Martin 4.0 L Turbo V8	58	Accident

== Standings after the race ==
GTP Drivers' Championship standings
Pos.	+/–	Driver	Points
1		(Brazil) Pipo Derani (United Kingdom) Alexander Sims	1872
2		(United States) Connor De Phillippi (United Kingdom) Nick Yelloly	1862
3	2	(Portugal) Filipe Albuquerque (United States) Ricky Taylor	1843
4	1	(United Kingdom) Nick Tandy (France) Mathieu Jaminet	1809
5	1	(France) Sébastien Bourdais (Netherlands) Renger van der Zande	1743

LMP2 Drivers' Championship standings
Pos.	+/–	Driver	Points
1		(United Kingdom) Ben Hanley (United States) George Kurtz	973
2		(Denmark) Mikkel Jensen (United States) Steven Thomas	970
3		(France) Paul-Loup Chatin (United States) Ben Keating	967
4		(United Kingdom) Ryan Dalziel (United States) Dwight Merriman	906
5		(Netherlands) Giedo van der Garde	850

LMP3 Drivers' Championship standings
Pos.	+/–	Driver	Points
1		(Brazil) Felipe Fraga (United States) Gar Robinson	1115
2		(United Kingdom) Wayne Boyd (Canada) Anthony Mantella	934
3	1	(Canada) Garett Grist	928
4	1	(United Kingdom) Matt Bell (Canada) Orey Fidani	916
5	6	(Portugal) João Barbosa (United States) Lance Willsey	788

GTD Pro Drivers' Championship standings
Pos.	+/–	Driver	Points
1		(United Kingdom) Ben Barnicoat (United Kingdom) Jack Hawksworth	2110
2		(Andorra) Jules Gounon (Spain) Daniel Juncadella	2014
3		(Spain) Antonio García (United States) Jordan Taylor	2001
4		(Austria) Klaus Bachler (France) Patrick Pilet	1955
5		(United Kingdom) Ross Gunn (Spain) Alex Riberas	1698

GTD Drivers' Championship standings
Pos.	+/–	Driver	Points
1		(United States) Bryan Sellers (United States) Madison Snow	1974
2	1	(Canada) Roman De Angelis (Denmark) Marco Sørensen	1762
3	1	(United States) Aaron Telitz (United States) Frankie Montecalvo	1755
4		(United States) Brendan Iribe (Denmark) Frederik Schandorff	1708
5	6	(Canada) Mikaël Grenier (United States) Mike Skeen	1451

- Note: Only the top five positions are included for all sets of standings.

GTP Teams' Championship standings
Pos.	+/–	Team	Points
1		(United States) #31 Whelen Engineering Racing	1872
2		(United States) #25 BMW M Team RLL	1862
3	2	(United States) #10 WTR with Andretti Autosport	1843
4	1	(Germany) #6 Porsche Penske Motorsport	1809
5	1	(United States) #01 Cadillac Racing	1743

LMP2 Teams' Championship standings
Pos.	+/–	Team	Points
1		(United States) #04 CrowdStrike Racing by APR	973
2		(France) #11 TDS Racing	970
3		(United States) #52 PR1/Mathiasen Motorsports	967
4		(United States) #18 Era Motorsport	906
5		(United States) #8 Tower Motorsports	889

LMP3 Teams' Championship standings
Pos.	+/–	Team	Points
1		(United States) #74 Riley Motorsports	1115
2		(Canada) #17 AWA	934
3	1	(United States) #30 Jr III Motorsports	928
4	1	(Canada) #13 AWA	916
5	2	(United States) #4 Ave Motorsports	808

GTD Pro Teams' Championship standings
Pos.	+/–	Team	Points
1		(United States) #14 Vasser Sullivan Racing	2110
2		(United States) #79 WeatherTech Racing	2014
3		(United States) #3 Corvette Racing	2001
4		(Canada) #9 Pfaff Motorsports	1955
5		(United States) #23 Heart of Racing Team	1698

GTD Teams' Championship standings
Pos.	+/–	Team	Points
1		(United States) #1 Paul Miller Racing	1974
2	1	(United States) #27 Heart of Racing Team	1762
3	1	(United States) #12 Vasser Sullivan Racing	1755
4		(United Kingdom) #70 Inception Racing	1708
5	6	(United States) #32 Team Korthoff Motorsports	1451

- Note: Only the top five positions are included for all sets of standings.

GTP Manufacturers' Championship standings
Pos.	+/–	Manufacturer	Points
1		(United States) Cadillac	2079
2		(Germany) BMW	2032
3	1	(Japan) Acura	2029
4	1	(Germany) Porsche	1985

GTD Pro Manufacturers' Championship standings
Pos.	+/–	Manufacturer	Points
1		(Japan) Lexus	2110
2		(Germany) Mercedes-AMG	2014
3		(United States) Chevrolet	2001
4		(Germany) Porsche	1955
5		(United Kingdom) Aston Martin	1709

GTD Manufacturers' Championship standings
Pos.	+/–	Manufacturer	Points
1		(Germany) BMW	2110
2		(United Kingdom) Aston Martin	1941
3		(Japan) Lexus	1875
4	1	(United Kingdom) McLaren	1855
5	1	(Germany) Porsche	1850

- Note: Only the top five positions are included for all sets of standings.

IMSA SportsCar Championship
Previous race: 2023 Sahlen's Six Hours of The Glen	2023 season	Next race: 2023 Northeast Grand Prix
