= 2022 Porsche Carrera Cup North America =

Motor racing competition

The 2022 Porsche Carrera Cup North America was the second season of the Porsche Carrera Cup North America. It began on March 16 at Sebring International Raceway and finished on October 1 at Road Atlanta.

== Calendar ==
The preliminary calendar was released on August 6, 2021, at IMSA's annual State of the Sport Address, without disclosing the location of round 2. On October 19, 2021, IMSA announced that an event at the Long Beach Street Circuit would fill the vacancy in the schedule. In April 2022, Indianapolis was announced as the replacement for round seven, which was initially scheduled to be held at Canadian Tire Motorsport Park.

Round	Circuit	Date
1	(United States) Sebring International Raceway, Sebring, Florida	March 16–19
2	(United States) Long Beach Street Circuit, Long Beach, California	April 8–10
3	(United States) WeatherTech Raceway Laguna Seca, Monterey, California	April 29 – May 1
4	(United States) Watkins Glen International, Watkins Glen, New York	June 23–26
5	(Canada) Grand Prix of Toronto, Toronto, Ontario	July 15–17
6	(United States) Road America, Elkhart Lake, Wisconsin	August 5–7
7	(United States) Indianapolis Motor Speedway, Speedway, Indiana	September 2–4
8	(United States) Road Atlanta, Braselton, Georgia	September 28 – October 1

== Series News ==
- The previous generation 991-spec Porsche 911 GT3 Cup car would no longer be permitted to compete in 2022, meaning the grid would be entirely made up of 992-spec machinery.

== Entry list ==
Team	No.	Driver	Rounds
Pro Class
(Canada) Kelly-Moss Road and Race	2	(United States) Sean Varwig	1, 4, 6
(Canada) Kelly-Moss Road and Race	3	(Netherlands) Kay van Berlo	All
(Canada) Kelly-Moss Road and Race	7	(United States) Michael McCarthy	All
(Canada) Kelly-Moss Road and Race	53	(United States) Riley Dickinson	All
(United States) MDK Motorsports	6	(United States) Trenton Estep	All
(United States) MDK Motorsports	43	(Canada) Jeff Kingsley	5
(United States) MDK Motorsports	91	(United Kingdom) Matthew Graham	7
(United States) McCann Racing	8	(United States) Michael McCann	1–4, 6–8
(United States) JDX Racing	9	(Canada) Parker Thompson	All
(United States) 311RS Motorsport	11	(United States) Dimitri Dimakos	1–4, 6–8
(United States) 311RS Motorsport	12	(United States) Leh Keen	1–4, 6–7
(United States) 311RS Motorsport	12	(Germany) Laurin Heinrich	8
(United States) Wright Motorsports	13	(United States) Varun Choksey	All
(United States) Wright Motorsports	88	(United States) Hutton McKenna	1–4, 6–8
(United States) Hendrick Performance Group	24	(United States) Jeff Gordon	7
(United States) Premier Racing	24	(United States) Adam Adelson	1–5, 8
(United States) Premier Racing	120	(United States) Adam Adelson	7
(United States) Topp Racing	58	(United States) TJ Fischer	1–4, 6–8
(United States) Topp Racing	77	(United States) Travis Wiley	All
(United States) ACI Motorsports	81	(United States) Grant Talkie	1–4, 7–8
(United States) Irish Mike's Racing	95	(United States) Conor Flynn	1–4, 6–7
Pro-Am Class
(United States) ACI Motorsports	16	(United States) Pedro Torres	1–4, 6, 8
(United States) ACI Motorsports	17	(United States) Curt Swearingin	1–4, 6–8
(United States) ACI Motorsports	18	(United States) Richard Edge	1–4, 6–8
(United States) Alegra Motorsports	22	(United States) Carlos de Quesada	1
(Canada) Kelly-Moss Road and Race	23	(United States) P. J. Hyett	6–8
(Canada) Kelly-Moss Road and Race	65	(Dominican Republic) Efrin Castro	All
(Canada) Kelly-Moss Road and Race	99	(United States) Alan Metni	All
(United States) JDX Racing	26	(United States) Peter Atwater	1
(United States) Goldcrest Motorsports	30	(France) Dominique Lequeux	1–4, 6
(United States) Goldcrest Motorsports	55	(United States) Matt Halcome	1–4, 6–8
(United States) GMG Racing	32	(United States) Kyle Washington	2–3, 5, 7
(United States) Accelerating Performance	44	(United States) Moisey Uretsky	1, 4, 6, 8
(United States) NOLASPORT	47	(United States) Justin Oakes	1–4, 6–8
(United States) Topp Racing	56	(United States) Jeff Mosing	1–2, 7–8
(United States) BGB Motorsports	69	(United States) Thomas Collingwood	All
(Canada) Mark Motors Racing	84	(Canada) Marco Cirone	1, 3–8
(United States) Ansa Motorsports	89	(United States) Mike Zoi	1
(United States) Irish Mike's Racing	97	(United States) Craig Conway	1–4, 6–7
Am Class
(United States) JDX Racing	4	(United States) Robert Hanley	1–3
(Canada) Kelly-Moss Road and Race	10	(United States) Vernon McClure	1–2, 6, 8
(Canada) Kelly-Moss Road and Race	19	(United States) Tom Balames	1, 4, 6
(Canada) Kelly-Moss Road and Race	92	(United States) Joseph Lombardo	1, 3–4, 7
(United States) Goldcrest Motorsports	21	(United States) Grady Willingham	1–4, 6–8
(United States) Goldcrest Motorsports	28	(United States) Bob Mueller	6, 8
(United States) Goldcrest Motorsports	29	(United States) Jeffrey Majkrzak	1–2, 6–8
(United States) Goldcrest Motorsports	80	(United States) Joe Still	1
(United States) Octavio Tequila Racing	28	(United States) Bob Mueller	1
(United States) Topp Racing	42	(United States) Bill Smith	All
(United States) MDK Motorsports	43	(United States) Mark Kvamme	1–4, 6–8
(United States) Wright Motorsports	57	(United States) John Goetz	All

== Results ==
Round	Circuit	Date	Pole position	Fastest lap	Winning driver	Winning team	Winning Pro-Am	Winning Am
1	(United States) Sebring International Raceway, Sebring, Florida	March 17	(Netherlands) Kay van Berlo	(Netherlands) Kay van Berlo	(Netherlands) Kay van Berlo	(Canada) Kelly-Moss Road and Race	(United States) Alan Metni	(United States) Mark Kvamme
2	(United States) Sebring International Raceway, Sebring, Florida	March 17	(Netherlands) Kay van Berlo	(United States) Riley Dickinson	(Netherlands) Kay van Berlo	(Canada) Kelly-Moss Road and Race	(Dominican Republic) Efrin Castro	(United States) Mark Kvamme
3	(United States) Long Beach Street Circuit, Long Beach, California	April 8–10	(Netherlands) Kay van Berlo	(Netherlands) Kay van Berlo	(Netherlands) Kay van Berlo	(Canada) Kelly-Moss Road and Race	(United States) Alan Metni	(United States) John Goetz
4	(United States) Long Beach Street Circuit, Long Beach, California	April 8–10	(Netherlands) Kay van Berlo	(Netherlands) Kay van Berlo	(Netherlands) Kay van Berlo	(Canada) Kelly-Moss Road and Race	(United States) Justin Oakes	(United States) Mark Kvamme
5	(United States) Laguna Seca, Monterey, California	April 29 – May 1	(United States) Trenton Estep	(United States) Trenton Estep	(Canada) Parker Thompson	(United States) JDX Racing	(Canada) Marco Cirone	(United States) Mark Kvamme
6	(United States) Laguna Seca, Monterey, California	April 29 – May 1	(United States) Riley Dickinson	(Netherlands) Kay van Berlo	(Canada) Parker Thompson	(United States) JDX Racing	(Dominican Republic) Efrin Castro	(United States) Robert Hanley
7	(United States) Watkins Glen International, Watkins Glen, New York	June 23–26	(Netherlands) Kay van Berlo	(Netherlands) Kay van Berlo	(Netherlands) Kay van Berlo	(Canada) Kelly-Moss Road and Race	(United States) Alan Metni	(United States) Mark Kvamme
8	(United States) Watkins Glen International, Watkins Glen, New York	June 23–26	(Netherlands) Kay van Berlo	(Netherlands) Kay van Berlo	(Netherlands) Kay van Berlo	(Canada) Kelly-Moss Road and Race	(Dominican Republic) Efrin Castro	(United States) Bill Smith
9	(Canada) Grand Prix of Toronto, Toronto, Ontario	July 15–17	(United States) Trenton Estep	(Netherlands) Kay van Berlo	(United States) Trenton Estep	(United States) MDK Motorsports	(Dominican Republic) Efrin Castro	(United States) Bill Smith
10	(Canada) Grand Prix of Toronto, Toronto, Ontario	July 15–17	(United States) Trenton Estep	(United States) Trenton Estep	(United States) Trenton Estep	(United States) MDK Motorsports	(Dominican Republic) Efrin Castro	(United States) Bill Smith
11	(United States) Road America, Elkhart Lake, Wisconsin	August 5–7	(Canada) Parker Thompson	(Canada) Parker Thompson	(Canada) Parker Thompson	(United States) JDX Racing	(Canada) Marco Cirone	(United States) Mark Kvamme
12	(United States) Road America, Elkhart Lake, Wisconsin	August 5–7	(Canada) Parker Thompson	(United States) Sean Varwig	(United States) Trenton Estep	(United States) MDK Motorsports	(Canada) Marco Cirone	(United States) Mark Kvamme
13	(United States) Indianapolis Motor Speedway, Speedway, Indiana	September 2–4	(Canada) Parker Thompson	(United States) Riley Dickinson	(Canada) Parker Thompson	(United States) JDX Racing	(Dominican Republic) Efrin Castro	(United States) Mark Kvamme
14	(United States) Indianapolis Motor Speedway, Speedway, Indiana	September 2–4	(Netherlands) Kay van Berlo	(United States) Riley Dickinson	(United States) Riley Dickinson	(Canada) Kelly-Moss Road and Race	(Dominican Republic) Efrin Castro	(United States) Mark Kvamme
15	(United States) Road Atlanta, Braselton, Georgia	September 28 – October 1	(Germany) Laurin Heinrich	(Germany) Laurin Heinrich	(Canada) Parker Thompson	(United States) JDX Racing	(Dominican Republic) Efrin Castro	(United States) John Goetz
16	(United States) Road Atlanta, Braselton, Georgia	September 28 – October 1	(Germany) Laurin Heinrich	(Germany) Laurin Heinrich	(Germany) Laurin Heinrich	(United States) 311RS Motorsport	(Dominican Republic) Efrin Castro	(United States) Mark Kvamme

== Championship standings ==
=== Points system ===
Championship points are awarded in each class at the finish of each event. Points are awarded based on finishing positions in the race as shown in the chart below.

Position	**1st**	**2nd**	**3rd**	**4th**	**5th**	**6th**	**7th**	**8th**	**9th**	**10th**	**11th**	**12th**	**13th**	**14th**	**15th**	Pole	FL
Points	25	20	17	14	12	10	9	8	7	6	5	4	3	2	1	2	1

=== Driver's Championship ===
Pos.	Driver	SEB (United States)		LBH (United States)		LGA (United States)		WGL (United States)		TOR (Canada)		ELK (United States)		IMS (United States)		ATL (United States)		Points
Overall
1	(Canada) Parker Thompson	2	3	2	4	1	1	3	4	6	2	**1**	**2**	**1**	32	1	3	306
2	(Netherlands) Kay van Berlo	**1**	**1**	**1**	**1**	4	3	**1**	**1**	2	4	4	30	21	**2**	2	27	290
3	(United States) Riley Dickinson	3	2	6	29	3	**2**	2	2	3	3	7	10	2	1	5	2	264
4	(United States) Trenton Estep	4	4	31	2	**2**	4	4	3	**1**	**1**	2	1	4	33	3	29	247
5	(United States) TJ Fischer	43	8	3	3	6	8	10	14			6	4	10	4	12	8	125
6	(United States) Michael McCarthy	6	42	9	6	5	14	DNS	DNS			3	6	5	7	4	9	111
7	(United States) Varun Choksey	9	7	8	30	29	9	8	7	5	5	19	8	8	6	7	14	110
8	(United States) Leh Keen	5	6	7	5	30†	5	5	5			8	27	6	5			109
9	(United States) Dimitri Dimakos	8	5	5	31	14	6	11	8			5	7	24	14	14	4	99
10	(United States) Travis Wiley	11	10	24	7	9	7	32	DNS	4	14	20	3	7	24	8	7	96
11	(United States) Michael McCann	7	13	4	28	28	13	6	9			11	9	9	29	9	5	86
12	(United States) Grant Talkie	10	9	30	8	7	10	13	24					14	8	6	6	71
13	(United States) Alan Metni	13	14	11	13	11	31	7	11	11	9	10	29	15	10	11	12	67
14	(Dominican Republic) Efrin Castro	39†	12	32	11	31	11	12	10	9	6	30	20	11	9	10	10	66
15	(United States) Sean Varwig	12	11					9	6			12	5					43
16	(United States) Adam Adelson	17	20	12	10	16	20	14	12	8	7			13	11	15	25	42
17	(United Kingdom) Matthew Graham													3	3			34
18	(Canada) Marco Cirone	27	19			10	28	23	15	10	15	9	11	16	15	27	11	33
19	(United States) Curt Swearingin	21	22	14	15	12	12	22	21			18	12	12	12	16	13	27
20	(United States) Hutton McKenna	42	17	10	25	8	DNS	16	13			31	22	DNS	DNS	13	26	20
21	(Canada) Jeff Kingsley									7	8							17
22	(United States) Justin Oakes	14	15	25	9	15	16	15	27			DNS	DNS	DNS	DNS	DNS	DNS	12
23	(United States) Thomas Collingwood	24	30	21	26	23	24	27	28	12	10	27	28	23	25	23	20	10
24	(United States) Jeff Mosing	15	18	13	12									17	17	24	24	8
25	(United States) Bill Smith	30	31	19	19	20	27	21	16	14	11			32	23	20	19	7
26	(United States) Kyle Washington			26	22	22	23			13	12			28	30			7
27	(United States) P. J. Hyett											14	14	19	13	DNS	DNS	7
28	(United States) Matt Halcome	16	27	17	16	17	19	17	17			13	13	30	21	26	22	6
29	(United States) Pedro Torres	18	23	20	20	13	15	19	31†			15	18			DNS	DNS	5
30	(United States) John Goetz	32	28	16	23	19	22	25	20	15	13	21	19	26	20	17	17	4
31	(United States) Conor Flynn	22	25	15	14			18	18			22	17	18	18			3
32	(United States) Mark Kvamme	20	24	29	18	18	18	20	22			16	16	22	19	18	15	2
33	(United States) Moisey Uretsky	19	16					26	19			17	15			19	18	1
34	(United States) Bob Mueller	23	DNS									23	DNS			22	16	1
35	(United States) Jeff Gordon													20	16			0
36	(France) Dominique Lequeux	31	35	18	17	24	30	29	32			32	DNS					0
37	(United States) Robert Hanley	26	38	22	21	32	17											0
38	(United States) Richard Edge	25	36	23	24	21	21	28	23			26	21	27	26	29†	28	0
39	(United States) Vernon McClure	34	26	27	DNS							24	23			21	21	0
40	(United States) Peter Atwater	28	21															0
41	(United States) Joseph Lombardo	35	34			26	25	24	30					25	22			0
42	(United States) Grady Willingham	23	37	DNS	27	25	26	30	26			29	26	31	31	25	23	0
43	(United States) Jeffrey Majkrzak	41†	29	28								25	24	33	27	DNS	DNS	0
44	(United States) Craig Conway	38	41	DNS	DNS	27	29	31	25			28	25	29	28			0
45	(United States) Tom Balames	40	40					DNS	29			DNS	DNS					0
46	(United States) Carlos De Quesada	29	33															0
47	(United States) Mike Zoi	36	32															0
48	(United States) Joe Still	37	39															0
Guest drivers ineligible to score points
	(Germany) Laurin Heinrich															**28**	**1**	0
Pro-Am Class
1	(United States) Alan Metni	13	14	11	13	11	31	7	11	11	9	10	29	15	10	11	12	289
2	(Dominican Republic) Efrin Castro	39†	12	32	11	31	11	12	10	9	6	30	20	11	9	10	10	288
3	(Canada) Marco Cirone	27	19			10	28	23	15	10	15	9	11	16	15	27	11	210
4	(United States) Curt Swearingin	21	22	14	15	12	12	22	21			18	12	12	12	16	13	200
5	(United States) Matt Halcome	16	27	17	16	17	19	17	17			13	13	30	21	26	22	160
6	(United States) Thomas Collingwood	24	30	21	26	23	24	27	28	12	10	27	28	23	25	23	20	138
7	(United States) Justin Oakes	14	15	25	9	15	16	15	27			DNS	DNS	DNS	DNS	DNS	DNS	119
8	(United States) Jeff Mosing	15	18	13	12									17	17	24	24	106
9	(United States) Pedro Torres	18	23	20	20	13	15	19	31†			15	18			DNS	DNS	106
10	(United States) Richard Edge	25	36	23	24	21	21	28	23			26	21	27	26	29†	28	101
11	(United States) Moisey Uretsky	19	16					26	19			17	15			19	18	92
12	(United States) Kyle Washington			26	22	22	23			13	12			28	30			68
13	(United States) P. J. Hyett											14	14	19	13	DNS	DNS	52
14	(France) Dominique Lequeux	31	35	18	17	24	30	29	32			32	DNS					51
15	(United States) Craig Conway	38	41	DNS	DNS	27	29	31	25			28	25	29	28			49
16	(United States) Peter Atwater	28	21															14
17	(United States) Carlos De Quesada	29	33															7
18	(United States) Mike Zoi	36	32															6
Am Class
1	(United States) Mark Kvamme	20	24	29	18	18	18	20	22			16	16	22	19	18	15	317
2	(United States) John Goetz	32	28	16	23	19	22	25	20	15	13	21	19	26	20	17	17	298
3	(United States) Bill Smith	30	31	19	19	20	27	21	16	14	11			32	23	20	19	245
4	(United States) Grady Willingham	23	37	DNS	27	25	26	30	26			29	26	31	31	25	23	149
5	(United States) Joseph Lombardo	35	34			26	25	24	30					25	22			108
6	(United States) Vernon McClure	34	26	27	DNS							24	23			21	21	100
7	(United States) Robert Hanley	26	38	22	21	32	17											94
8	(United States) Jeffrey Majkrzak	41†	29	28								25	24	33	27	DNS	DNS	79
9	(United States) Bob Mueller	23	DNS									23	DNS			22	16	69
10	(United States) Tom Balames	40	40					DNS	29			DNS	DNS					24
11	(United States) Joe Still	37	39															14
Pos.	Drivers	SEB (United States)		LBH (United States)		LGA (United States)		WGL (United States)		TOR (Canada)		ELK (United States)		IMS (United States)		ATL (United States)		Points

Colour	Result
Gold	Winner
Silver	Second place
Bronze	Third place
Green	Points classification
Blue	Non-points classification
Blue	Non-classified finish (NC)
Purple	Retired, not classified (Ret)
Red	Did not qualify (DNQ)
Red	Did not pre-qualify (DNPQ)
Black	Disqualified (DSQ)
White	Did not start (DNS)
White	Withdrew (WD)
White	Race cancelled (C)
Blank	Did not practice (DNP)
Blank	Did not arrive (DNA)
Blank	Excluded (EX)

- **Bold** - Pole position
- Italics - Fastest lap

†: Post-event penalty. Car moved to back of class.
