= 2019 International GT Open =

The 2019 International GT Open was the fourteenth season of the International GT Open, the grand tourer-style sports car racing series founded in 2006 by the Spanish GT Sport Organización. It began on 27 April at Le Castellet and ended on 12 October, at Monza after seven double-header meetings.

== Entry list ==
Team	Car	No.	Drivers	Class	Rounds
(Czech Republic) Senkyr Motorsport	BMW M6 GT3	3	(Slovakia) Richard Gonda (Note: Richard Gonda and Beitske Visser originally entered the Spa round as a Pro-Am car but were switched to Pro".)	P	4–6
(Czech Republic) Senkyr Motorsport	BMW M6 GT3	3	(Netherlands) Beitske Visser	P	4–6
(Belgium) Boutsen Ginion	Lamborghini Huracán GT3 Evo	4	(France) Pierre Feligioni	Am	6
(Belgium) Boutsen Ginion	Lamborghini Huracán GT3 Evo	4	(France) Claude-Yves Gosselin	Am	6
(Poland) Olimp Racing	Mercedes-AMG GT3	5	(Poland) Stanislaw Jedinski	Am	4, 6
(Poland) Olimp Racing	Audi R8 LMS Evo	77	(Poland) Marcin Jedlinski	PA	4, 6
(Poland) Olimp Racing	Audi R8 LMS Evo	77	(Poland) Mateusz Lisowski	PA	4, 6
(Italy) Antonelli MotorSport	Mercedes-AMG GT3	6	(Italy) Daniel Zampieri	P	1–5
(Italy) Antonelli MotorSport	Mercedes-AMG GT3	6	(Italy) Alessio Rovera	P	1–2, 4
(Italy) Antonelli MotorSport	Mercedes-AMG GT3	6	(United Kingdom) Michael Meadows	P	3
(Italy) Antonelli MotorSport	Mercedes-AMG GT3	6	(Italy) Loris Spinelli	P	5–7
(Italy) Antonelli MotorSport	Mercedes-AMG GT3	6	(Italy) Riccardo Agostini	P	6–7
(Italy) Antonelli MotorSport	Mercedes-AMG GT3	8	(Italy) Giuseppe Cipriani	Am	All
(Italy) Antonelli MotorSport	Mercedes-AMG GT3	9	(Italy) Davide Roda	Am	1–5
(Italy) Petri Corse	Bentley Continental GT3	7	(Romania) Petru Umbrărescu	P	1
(Italy) Petri Corse	Bentley Continental GT3	7	(France) Jules Gounon	P	1
(Germany) SPS Automotive Performance	Mercedes-AMG GT3	10	(Italy) Fabrizio Crestani	P	All
(Germany) SPS Automotive Performance	Mercedes-AMG GT3	10	(Portugal) Miguel Ramos	P	All
(Germany) SPS Automotive Performance	Mercedes-AMG GT3	20	(United Kingdom) Tom Onslow-Cole	PA	All
(Germany) SPS Automotive Performance	Mercedes-AMG GT3	20	(Germany) Valentin Pierburg	PA	All
(Germany) GetSpeed Performance	Mercedes-AMG GT3	11	(United Kingdom) Janine Hill	Am	2–3, 6
(Germany) GetSpeed Performance	Mercedes-AMG GT3	11	(United States) John Shoffner	Am	2–3, 6
(Germany) GetSpeed Performance	Mercedes-AMG GT3	13	(Russia) Denis Remenyako	PA	6
(Germany) GetSpeed Performance	Mercedes-AMG GT3	13	(Germany) Fabian Schiller	PA	6
(Italy) Ombra Racing	Lamborghini Huracán GT3 Evo	12	(Italy) Federico Leo	P	1–3, 5–7
(Italy) Ombra Racing	Lamborghini Huracán GT3 Evo	12	(Malaysia) Najiy Razak	P	1–3, 5–7
(Switzerland) Emil Frey Racing	Lamborghini Huracán GT3 Evo	14	(Canada) Mikaël Grenier	P	All
(Switzerland) Emil Frey Racing	Lamborghini Huracán GT3 Evo	14	(Austria) Norbert Siedler	P	All
(Switzerland) Emil Frey Racing	Lamborghini Huracán GT3 Evo	63	(Italy) Giacomo Altoè	P	All
(Switzerland) Emil Frey Racing	Lamborghini Huracán GT3 Evo	63	(Spain) Albert Costa	P	All
(Spain) Teo Martín Motorsport	McLaren 720S GT3	16	(Brazil) Marcelo Hahn	PA	All
(Spain) Teo Martín Motorsport	McLaren 720S GT3	16	(Brazil) Allam Khodair	PA	1–2, 4–7
(Spain) Teo Martín Motorsport	McLaren 720S GT3	16	(United Kingdom) Ben Barnicoat	PA	3
(Spain) Teo Martín Motorsport	McLaren 720S GT3	17	(Spain) Fran Rueda	P	All
(Spain) Teo Martín Motorsport	McLaren 720S GT3	17	(Guatemala) Andrés Saravia	P	All
(Spain) Teo Martín Motorsport	McLaren 720S GT3	59	(Portugal) Henrique Chaves	P	All
(Spain) Teo Martín Motorsport	McLaren 720S GT3	59	(Croatia) Martin Kodrić	P	All
(Italy) Raton Racing by Target	Lamborghini Huracán GT3 Evo	19	(Italy) Raffaele Giammaria	PA	All
(Italy) Raton Racing by Target	Lamborghini Huracán GT3 Evo	19	(China) Liang Jiatong	PA	All
(Italy) Raton Racing by Target	Lamborghini Huracán GT3 Evo	90	(Italy) Alberto Di Folco	PA	1–3, 7
(Italy) Raton Racing by Target	Lamborghini Huracán GT3 Evo	90	(Switzerland) Christoph Lenz	PA	1–3, 6–7
(Italy) Raton Racing by Target	Lamborghini Huracán GT3 Evo	90	(France) Franck Perrera	PA	6
(Switzerland) Spirit of Race	Ferrari 488 GT3	21	(United Kingdom) Duncan Cameron	PA	1–2, 5, 7
(Switzerland) Spirit of Race	Ferrari 488 GT3	21	(Republic of Ireland) Matt Griffin	PA	1–2, 5, 7
(Switzerland) Spirit of Race	Ferrari 488 GT3	51	(Brazil) Oswaldo Negri (Note: Drivers who started their first race of the season at the final round are ineligible for points and invisible as far as awarding points to other drivers".)	Am	7
(Switzerland) Spirit of Race	Ferrari 488 GT3	51	(Puerto Rico) Francesco Piovanetti	Am	7
(Portugal) Sports and you	Mercedes-AMG GT3	22	(Brazil) Marcio Basso	PA	6
(Portugal) Sports and you	Mercedes-AMG GT3	22	(Brazil) Guilherme Salas	PA	6
(Portugal) Sports and you	Mercedes-AMG GT3	22	(Brazil) Guilherme Salas (Note: Due to Marcio Basso not racing the second race at Barcelona, Guilherme Salas raced solo and was classified as a Pro".)	P	6
(Portugal) Sports and you	Mercedes-AMG GT3	99	(Portugal) "Manuel da Costa" (Note: António Coimbra sometimes uses pseudonym "Manuel da Costa".)	Am	1–3, 5, 7
(Portugal) Sports and you	Mercedes-AMG GT3	99	(Portugal) "Miguel Sardinha" (Note: Luís Silva sometimes uses pseudonym "Miguel Sardinha".)	Am	1–3, 5, 7
(Germany) HTP Motorsport	Mercedes-AMG GT3	25	(Austria) Alexander Hrachowina	Am	1–4, 6–7
(Germany) HTP Motorsport	Mercedes-AMG GT3	25	(Austria) Martin Konrad	Am	1–4, 6–7
(Italy) Lazarus Racing	Lamborghini Huracán GT3	26	(Spain) Eliseo Martínez	P	1–4
(Italy) Lazarus Racing	Lamborghini Huracán GT3	26	(Italy) Fabio Onidi	P	1–4
(Italy) Lazarus Racing	Lamborghini Huracán GT3	27	(Italy) Nicola de Marco	P	1–5
(Italy) Lazarus Racing	Lamborghini Huracán GT3	27	(Germany) Nicolas Pohler	P	1–4
(Italy) Lazarus Racing	Lamborghini Huracán GT3	27	(Spain) Eliseo Martínez	P	5
(Italy) Lazarus Racing	Lamborghini Huracán GT3	27	(Argentina) Ezequiel Perez Companc	PA	6
(Italy) Lazarus Racing	Lamborghini Huracán GT3	27	(Spain) Eliseo Martínez	PA	6
(Italy) Lazarus Racing	Lamborghini Huracán GT3	27	(Poland) Andrzej Lewandowski	Am	7
(Italy) Lazarus Racing	Lamborghini Huracán GT3	27	(Spain) Eliseo Martínez	Am	7
(Germany) Frikadelli Racing	Porsche 911 GT3 R	31	(Germany) Klaus Abbelen	PA	7
(Germany) Frikadelli Racing	Porsche 911 GT3 R	31	(Austria) Thomas Preining	PA	7
(Germany) Winward Racing	Mercedes-AMG GT3	33	(Netherlands) Indy Dontje	PA	2, 5–6
(Germany) Winward Racing	Mercedes-AMG GT3	33	(United States) Russell Ward	PA	2, 5–6
(Italy) Imperiale Racing	Lamborghini Huracán GT3	34	(Switzerland) Adrian Amstutz	PA	3
(Italy) Imperiale Racing	Lamborghini Huracán GT3	34	(Finland) Patrick Kujala	PA	3
(Switzerland) Kessel Racing	Ferrari 488 GT3	50	(United Kingdom) Oliver Hancock	PA	5
(Switzerland) Kessel Racing	Ferrari 488 GT3	50	(United Kingdom) John Hartshorne	PA	5
(Italy) Vincenzo Sospiri Racing	Lamborghini Huracán GT3	66	(Denmark) Frederik Schandorff	PA	All
(Italy) Vincenzo Sospiri Racing	Lamborghini Huracán GT3	66	(China) Kang Ling	PA	1–3
(Italy) Vincenzo Sospiri Racing	Lamborghini Huracán GT3	66	(Finland) Tuomas Tujula	PA	4–7
(Australia) SunEnergy1 Racing	Mercedes-AMG GT3	75	(Australia) Kenny Habul	PA	1–4
(Australia) SunEnergy1 Racing	Mercedes-AMG GT3	75	(Germany) Thomas Jäger	PA	1–4
(United Kingdom) Tempesta Racing	Ferrari 488 GT3	93	(Italy) Eddie Cheever	PA	1–4
(United Kingdom) Tempesta Racing	Ferrari 488 GT3	93	(United Kingdom) Chris Froggatt	PA	1–4
(United Kingdom) Optimum Motorsport	Aston Martin Vantage AMR GT3	96	(United Kingdom) Ollie Wilkinson	PA	1
(United Kingdom) Optimum Motorsport	Aston Martin Vantage AMR GT3	96	(United Kingdom) Bradley Ellis	PA	1
(United Kingdom) Optimum Motorsport	Aston Martin Vantage AMR GT3	96	(United Kingdom) Ollie Wilkinson (Note: Darren Turner and Ollie Wilkinson originally entered the Hockenheim round as a Pro-Am car but were switched to Pro".)	P	2, 4–7
(United Kingdom) Optimum Motorsport	Aston Martin Vantage AMR GT3	96	(United Kingdom) Jonny Adam	P	4
(United Kingdom) Optimum Motorsport	Aston Martin Vantage AMR GT3	96	(United Kingdom) Darren Turner	P	2, 5–7

Icon	Class
P	Pro Cup
PA	Pro-Am Cup
Am	Am Cup

== Race calendar and results ==
- A seven-round provisional calendar was revealed on 22 September 2018. The schedule will feature six circuits from 2018 calendar, while Estoril will be dropped in favor of Hockenheimring. The date of the Spa round was altered on 29 November 2018. On 1 February 2019, Hungaroring were replaced by Red Bull Ring, and 2019 International GT Open Round 4 moved to 13–14 July.

Round		Circuit	Date	Pole position	Pro Winner	Pro-Am Winner	Am Winner
1	R1	(France) Circuit Paul Ricard, Le Castellet	27 April	(Spain) No. 16 Teo Martín Motorsport	(Switzerland) No. 63 Emil Frey Racing	(Germany) No. 20 SPS Automotive Performance	(Germany) No. 25 HTP Motorsport
1	R1	(France) Circuit Paul Ricard, Le Castellet	27 April	(Brazil) Marcello Hahn (Brazil) Allam Khodair	(Italy) Giacomo Altoè (Spain) Albert Costa	(United Kingdom) Tom Onslow-Cole (Germany) Valentin Pierburg	(Austria) Alexander Hrachowina (Austria) Martin Konrad
1	R2	(France) Circuit Paul Ricard, Le Castellet	28 April	(Germany) No. 20 SPS Automotive Performance	(Switzerland) No. 14 Emil Frey Racing	(Germany) No. 19 Raton Racing by Target	(Germany) No. 25 HTP Motorsport
1	R2	(France) Circuit Paul Ricard, Le Castellet	28 April	(United Kingdom) Tom Onslow-Cole (Germany) Valentin Pierburg	(Canada) Mikaël Grenier (Austria) Norbert Siedler	(Italy) Raffaele Giammaria (China) Liang Jiatong	(Austria) Alexander Hrachowina (Austria) Martin Konrad
2	R1	(Germany) Hockenheimring	25 May	(Germany) No. 20 SPS Automotive Performance	(Spain) No. 17 Teo Martín Motorsport	(Switzerland) No. 21 Spirit of Race	(Germany) No. 25 HTP Motorsport
2	R1	(Germany) Hockenheimring	25 May	(United Kingdom) Tom Onslow-Cole (Germany) Valentin Pierburg	(Spain) Fran Rueda (Guatemala) Andrés Saravia	(United Kingdom) Duncan Cameron (Republic of Ireland) Matt Griffin	(Austria) Alexander Hrachowina (Austria) Martin Konrad
2	R2	(Germany) Hockenheimring	26 May	(Switzerland) No. 14 Emil Frey Racing	(Switzerland) No. 14 Emil Frey Racing	(Germany) No. 33 Winward Racing	(Germany) No. 25 HTP Motorsport
2	R2	(Germany) Hockenheimring	26 May	(Canada) Mikaël Grenier (Austria) Norbert Siedler	(Canada) Mikaël Grenier (Austria) Norbert Siedler	(Netherlands) Indy Dontje (United States) Russell Ward	(Austria) Alexander Hrachowina (Austria) Martin Konrad
3	R1	(Belgium) Circuit de Spa-Francorchamps	8 June	(Italy) No. 34 Imperiale Racing	(Switzerland) No. 14 Emil Frey Racing	(Italy) No. 34 Imperiale Racing	(Italy) No. 9 Antonelli MotorSport
3	R1	(Belgium) Circuit de Spa-Francorchamps	8 June	(Switzerland) Adrian Amstutz (Finland) Patrick Kujala	(Canada) Mikaël Grenier (Austria) Norbert Siedler	(Switzerland) Adrian Amstutz (Finland) Patrick Kujala	(Italy) Davide Roda
3	R2	(Belgium) Circuit de Spa-Francorchamps	9 June	(Germany) No. 20 SPS Automotive Performance	(Spain) No. 17 Teo Martín Motorsport	(Germany) No. 20 SPS Automotive Performance	(Italy) No. 9 Antonelli MotorSport
3	R2	(Belgium) Circuit de Spa-Francorchamps	9 June	(United Kingdom) Tom Onslow-Cole (Germany) Valentin Pierburg	(Spain) Fran Rueda (Guatemala) Andrés Saravia	(United Kingdom) Tom Onslow-Cole (Germany) Valentin Pierburg	(Italy) Davide Roda
4	R1	(Austria) Red Bull Ring	13 July	(Spain) No. 17 Teo Martín Motorsport	(Switzerland) No. 63 Emil Frey Racing	(Italy) No. 66 Vincenzo Sospiri Racing	(Germany) No. 25 HTP Motorsport
4	R1	(Austria) Red Bull Ring	13 July	(Spain) Fran Rueda (Guatemala) Andrés Saravia	(Italy) Giacomo Altoè (Spain) Albert Costa	(Denmark) Frederik Schandorff (Finland) Tuomas Tujula	(Austria) Alexander Hrachowina (Austria) Martin Konrad
4	R2	(Austria) Red Bull Ring	14 July	(United Kingdom) No. 96 Optimum Motorsport	(United Kingdom) No. 96 Optimum Motorsport	(Germany) No. 20 SPS Automotive Performance	(Germany) No. 25 HTP Motorsport
4	R2	(Austria) Red Bull Ring	14 July	(United Kingdom) Jonny Adam (United Kingdom) Ollie Wilkinson	(United Kingdom) Jonny Adam (United Kingdom) Ollie Wilkinson	(United Kingdom) Tom Onslow-Cole (Germany) Valentin Pierburg	(Austria) Alexander Hrachowina (Austria) Martin Konrad
5	R1	(United Kingdom) Silverstone Circuit	7 September	(Switzerland) No. 63 Emil Frey Racing	(Switzerland) No. 63 Emil Frey Racing	(Germany) No. 19 Raton Racing by Target	(Portugal) No. 99 Sports and you
5	R1	(United Kingdom) Silverstone Circuit	7 September	(Italy) Giacomo Altoè (Spain) Albert Costa	(Italy) Giacomo Altoè (Spain) Albert Costa	(Italy) Raffaele Giammaria (China) Liang Jiatong	(Portugal) "Manuel da Costa" (Portugal) "Miguel Sardinha"
5	R2	(United Kingdom) Silverstone Circuit	8 September	(Switzerland) No. 63 Emil Frey Racing	(Switzerland) No. 63 Emil Frey Racing	(Italy) No. 66 Vincenzo Sospiri Racing	(Portugal) No. 99 Sports and you
5	R2	(United Kingdom) Silverstone Circuit	8 September	(Italy) Giacomo Altoè (Spain) Albert Costa	(Italy) Giacomo Altoè (Spain) Albert Costa	(Denmark) Frederik Schandorff (Finland) Tuomas Tujula	(Portugal) "Manuel da Costa" (Portugal) "Miguel Sardinha"
6	R1	(Spain) Circuit de Barcelona-Catalunya	21 September	(Germany) No. 10 SPS Automotive Performance	(Spain) No. 17 Teo Martín Motorsport	(Italy) No. 66 Vincenzo Sospiri Racing	(Italy) No. 8 Antonelli MotorSport
6	R1	(Spain) Circuit de Barcelona-Catalunya	21 September	(Italy) Fabrizio Crestani (Portugal) Miguel Ramos	(Spain) Fran Rueda (Guatemala) Andrés Saravia	(Denmark) Frederik Schandorff (Finland) Tuomas Tujula	(Italy) Giuseppe Cipriani
6	R2	(Spain) Circuit de Barcelona-Catalunya	22 September	(Switzerland) No. 63 Emil Frey Racing	(Switzerland) No. 14 Emil Frey Racing	(Spain) No. 16 Teo Martín Motorsport	(Italy) No. 8 Antonelli MotorSport
6	R2	(Spain) Circuit de Barcelona-Catalunya	22 September	(Italy) Giacomo Altoè (Spain) Albert Costa	(Canada) Mikaël Grenier (Austria) Norbert Siedler	(Brazil) Marcelo Hahn (Brazil) Allam Khodair	(Italy) Giuseppe Cipriani
7	R1	(Italy) Autodromo Nazionale Monza	12 October	(Switzerland) No. 63 Emil Frey Racing	(Germany) No. 10 SPS Automotive Performance	(Italy) No. 66 Vincenzo Sospiri Racing	(Switzerland) No. 51 Spirit of Race
7	R1	(Italy) Autodromo Nazionale Monza	12 October	(Italy) Giacomo Altoè (Spain) Albert Costa	(Italy) Fabrizio Crestani (Portugal) Miguel Ramos	(Denmark) Frederik Schandorff (Finland) Tuomas Tujula	(Brazil) Oswaldo Negri (Puerto Rico) Francesco Piovanetti
7	R2	(Italy) Autodromo Nazionale Monza	13 October	(Switzerland) No. 14 Emil Frey Racing	(Spain) No. 59 Teo Martín Motorsport	(Spain) No. 16 Teo Martín Motorsport	(Italy) No. 8 Antonelli MotorSport
7	R2	(Italy) Autodromo Nazionale Monza	13 October	(Canada) Mikaël Grenier (Austria) Norbert Siedler	(Portugal) Henrique Chaves (Croatia) Martin Kodrić	(Brazil) Marcelo Hahn (Brazil) Allam Khodair	(Italy) Giuseppe Cipriani

== Championship standings ==
=== Points systems ===
Points are awarded to the top 10 (Pro) or top 6 (Am, Pro-Am, Teams) classified finishers. If less than 6 participants start the race or if less than 75% of the original race distance is completed, half points are awarded. At the end of the season, the lowest race score is dropped; however, the dropped race cannot be the result of a disqualification or race ban.

==== Overall ====
Position	1st	2nd	3rd	4th	5th	6th	7th	8th	9th	10th
Points	15	12	10	8	6	5	4	3	2	1

==== Pro-Am, Am, and Teams ====
Position	1st	2nd	3rd	4th	5th	6th
Points	10	8	6	4	3	2

=== Drivers' championships ===
==== Overall ====
Pos.	Driver	Team	LEC (France)		HOC (Germany)		SPA (Belgium)		RBR (Austria)		SIL (United Kingdom)		CAT (Spain)		MNZ (Italy)		Points
1	(Italy) Giacomo Altoè (Spain) Albert Costa	(Switzerland) Emil Frey Racing	1	4	5	2	4	Ret	1	5	1	1	11	2	4	4	128
2	(Canada) Mikaël Grenier (Austria) Norbert Siedler	(Switzerland) Emil Frey Racing	Ret	1	7	1	1	9	7	19	2	3	4	1	5	3	116
3	(Portugal) Henrique Chaves (Croatia) Martin Kodrić	(Spain) Teo Martín Motorsport	2	7	4	5	3	2	3	4	4	6	3	4	Ret	1	116
4	(Spain) Fran Rueda (Guatemala) Andrés Saravia	(Spain) Teo Martín Motorsport	3	DNS	1	14	Ret	1	4	2	5	2	1	8	6	2	113
5	(Italy) Fabrizio Crestani (Portugal) Miguel Ramos	(Germany) SPS Automotive Performance	4	3	9	4	2	7	9	3	3	5	10	7	1	9	92
6	(United Kingdom) Ollie Wilkinson	(United Kingdom) Optimum Motorsport	11	6	8	3			6	1	Ret	7	Ret	5	3	7	62
7	(Italy) Loris Spinelli	(Italy) Antonelli MotorSport									16	8	2	6	2	5	38
8	(United Kingdom) Tom Onslow-Cole (Germany) Valentin Pierburg	(Germany) SPS Automotive Performance	9	16	3	11	9	3	14	6	7	12	12	16	17	DSQ	37
9	(United Kingdom) Darren Turner	(United Kingdom) Optimum Motorsport			8	3					Ret	7	Ret	5	3	7	37
10	(Italy) Riccardo Agostini	(Italy) Antonelli MotorSport											2	6	2	5	35
11	(Slovakia) Richard Gonda (Netherlands) Beitske Visser	(Czech Republic) Senkyr Motorsport							2	7	8	4	7	9			33
12	(Denmark) Frederik Schandorff	(Italy) Vincenzo Sospiri Racing	10	13	12	8	8	10	5	11	9	9	5	22	7	10	28
13	(United Kingdom) Duncan Cameron (Republic of Ireland) Matt Griffin	(Switzerland) Spirit of Race	12	9	2	9					10	10			Ret	8	21
14	(United Kingdom) Jonny Adam	(United Kingdom) Optimum Motorsport							6	1							20
15	(Italy) Daniel Zampieri	(Italy) Antonelli MotorSport	6	2	Ret	Ret	13	Ret	19	18	16	8					20
16	(Finland) Tuomas Tujula	(Italy) Vincenzo Sospiri Racing							5	11	9	9	5	22	7	10	20
17	(Italy) Raffaele Giammaria (China) Liang Jiatong	(Italy) Raton Racing by Target	8	5	Ret	10	20	15	10	14	6	13	14	15	9	11	18
18	(Italy) Alessio Rovera	(Italy) Antonelli MotorSport	6	2	Ret	Ret			19	18							17
19	(Italy) Nicola de Marco	(Italy) Lazarus Racing	17	11	14	6	7	4	11	13	13	11					17
19	(Germany) Nicolas Pohler	(Italy) Lazarus Racing	17	11	14	6	7	4	11								17
20	(Brazil) Marcelo Hahn	(Spain) Teo Martín Motorsport	7	DNS	13	18	14	13	8	9	Ret	DNS	13	10	11	6	15
20	(Brazil) Allam Khodair	(Spain) Teo Martín Motorsport	7	DNS	13	18			8	9	Ret	DNS	13	10	11	6	15
21	(Australia) Kenny Habul (Germany) Thomas Jäger	(United States) SunEnergy1 Racing	9	14	17	21	6	5	13	10							14
22	(Netherlands) Indy Dontje (United States) Russell Ward	(Germany) Winward Racing			6	7					12	Ret	6	13			14
23	(Brazil) Guilherme Salas	(Portugal) Sports and you											16	3			10
24	(Switzerland) Adrian Amstutz (Finland) Patrick Kujala	(Italy) Imperiale Racing					5	8									9
25	(China) Kang Ling	(Italy) Vincenzo Sospiri Racing	10	13	12	8	8	10									8
26	(Italy) Fabio Onidi	(Italy) Lazarus Racing	19	10			11	6	Ret	Ret							6
27	(Spain) Eliseo Martínez	(Italy) Lazarus Racing	19	10			11	6	Ret	Ret	13	11	17	14	Ret	15	6
28	(Italy) Eddie Cheever (United Kingdom) Chris Froggatt	(United Kingdom) Tempesta Racing	Ret	8	10	12	10	12	16	12							5
29	(United Kingdom) Bradley Ellis	(United Kingdom) Optimum Motorsport	11	6													5
30	(Italy) Federico Leo (Malaysia) Najiy Razak	(Italy) Ombra Racing	16	15	11	13	19	11			Ret	Ret	18	12	8	Ret	3
31	(Russia) Denis Remenyako (Germany) Fabian Schiller	(Germany) GetSpeed Performance											8	11			3
32	(Poland) Marcin Jedlinski (Poland) Mateusz Lisowski	(Poland) Olimp Racing							Ret	8			22	21			3
33	(Switzerland) Christoph Lenz	(Italy) Raton Racing by Target	14	12	16	17	12	18					9	18	10	14	3
34	(France) Franck Perrera	(Italy) Raton Racing by Target											9	18			2
35	(Italy) Alberto Di Folco	(Italy) Raton Racing by Target	14	12	16	17	12	18							10	14	1
36	(France) Pierre Feligioni (France) Claude-Yves Gosselin	(Belgium) Boutsen Ginion											20	20			0
37	(Poland) Stanislaw Jedinski	(Poland) Olimp Racing							18	20			21	Ret			0
38	(United Kingdom) Michael Meadows	(Italy) Antonelli MotorSport					13	Ret									0
39	(France) Jules Gounon (Romania) Petru Umbrărescu	(Italy) Petri Corse	Ret	DNS													0
40	(Italy) Davide Roda	(Italy) Antonelli MotorSport	17	19	Ret	Ret	15	14	15	17	Ret	DNS					0
41	(Italy) Giuseppe Cipriani	(Italy) Antonelli MotorSport	15	18	Ret	16	16	DNS	17	16	15	Ret	15	17	16	13	0
42	(United Kingdom) Janine Hill (United States) John Shoffner	(Germany) GetSpeed Performance			19	20	18	17					19	19			0
43	(United Kingdom) Ben Barnicoat	(Spain) Teo Martín Motorsport					14	13									0
44	(Austria) Alexander Hrachowina (Austria) Martin Konrad	(Germany) HTP Motorsport	13	17	15	15	Ret	16	12	15					15	Ret	0
45	(United Kingdom) Oliver Hancock (United Kingdom) John Hartshorne	(Switzerland) Kessel Racing									11	14					0
46	(Portugal) "Manuel da Costa" (Portugal) "Miguel Sardinha"	(Portugal) Sports and you	20	20	18	19	17	Ret			14	15			14	Ret	0
47	(Brazil) Marcio Basso	(Portugal) Sports and you											16	DNS			0
48	(Argentina) Ezequiel Perez Companc	(Italy) Lazarus Racing											17	14			0
Entries ineligible to score points
	(Brazil) Oswaldo Negri (Puerto Rico) Francesco Piovanetti	(Switzerland) Spirit of Race													13	16	
	(Germany) Klaus Abbelen (Austria) Thomas Preining	(Germany) Frikadelli Racing													12	12	
	(Poland) Andrzej Lewandowski	(Italy) Lazarus Racing													Ret	15	
Pos.	Driver	Team	LEC (France)		HOC (Germany)		SPA (Belgium)		RBR (Austria)		SIL (United Kingdom)		CAT (Spain)		MNZ (Italy)		Points

==== Pro-Am ====
Pos.	Driver	Team	LEC (France)		HOC (Germany)		SPA (Belgium)		RBR (Austria)		SIL (United Kingdom)		CAT (Spain)		MNZ (Italy)		Points
1	(Denmark) Frederik Schandorff	(Italy) Vincenzo Sospiri Racing	5	6	5	2	3	4	1	5	3	1	1	9	1	3	78
2	(United Kingdom) Tom Onslow-Cole (Germany) Valentin Pierburg	(Germany) SPS Automotive Performance	1	8	2	4	4	1	5	1	2	3	5	6	6	DSQ	72
3	(Italy) Raffaele Giammaria (China) Liang Jiatong	(Italy) Raton Racing by Target	3	1			8	7	3	7	1	4	7	5	2	4	53
4	(Finland) Tuomas Tujula	(Italy) Vincenzo Sospiri Racing							1	5	3	1	1	9	1	3	52
5	(Brazil) Marcelo Hahn	(Spain) Teo Martín Motorsport	2	Ret	6	7	7	6	2	3	Ret	DNS	6	1	4	1	52
6	(Brazil) Allam Khodair	(Spain) Teo Martín Motorsport	2	Ret	6	7			2	3	Ret	DNS	6	1	4	1	50
7	(United Kingdom) Duncan Cameron (Republic of Ireland) Matt Griffin	(Switzerland) Spirit of Race	7	4	1	3					4	2			Ret	2	40
8	(Netherlands) Indy Dontje (United States) Russell Ward	(Germany) Winward Racing			3	1					6	Ret	2	3			32
9	(Australia) Kenny Habul (Germany) Thomas Jäger	(United States) SunEnergy1 Racing	4	7	8	8	2	2	4	4							27
10	(China) Kang Ling	(Italy) Vincenzo Sospiri Racing	5	6	5	2	3	4									26
11	(Italy) Eddie Cheever (United Kingdom) Chris Froggatt	(United Kingdom) Tempesta Racing	Ret	3	4	5	5	5	6	6							23
12	(Switzerland) Christoph Lenz	(Italy) Raton Racing by Target	8	5	7	6	6	8					4	7	3	6	21
13	(Italy) Alberto Di Folco	(Italy) Raton Racing by Target	8	5	7	6	6	8							3	6	17
14	(Switzerland) Adrian Amstutz (Finland) Patrick Kujala	(Switzerland) Spirit of Race					1	3									16
15	(Russia) Denis Remenyako (Germany) Fabian Schiller	(Germany) Getspeed Performance											3	2			14
16	(United Kingdom) Ollie Wilkinson	(United Kingdom) Optimum Motorsport	6	2													10
16	(United Kingdom) Bradley Ellis	(United Kingdom) Optimum Motorsport	6	2													10
17	(Poland) Marcin Jedlinski (Poland) Mateusz Lisowski	(Poland) Olimp Racing							Ret	2			10	8			8
18	(United Kingdom) Oliver Hancock (United Kingdom) John Hartshorne	(Switzerland) Kessel Racing									5	5					6
19	(Spain) Eliseo Martínez (Argentina) Ezequiel Perez Companc	(Italy) Lazarus Racing											9	4			4
20	(France) Franck Perrera	(Italy) Raton Racing by Target											4	7			4
21	(United Kingdom) Ben Barnicoat	(Spain) Teo Martín Motorsport					7	6									2
22	(Brazil) Marcio Basso (Brazil) Guilherme Salas	(Portugal) Sports and you											8	DNS			0
Entries ineligible to score points
	(Germany) Klaus Abbelen (Austria) Thomas Preining	(Germany) Frikadelli Racing													5	5	
Pos.	Driver	Team	LEC (France)		HOC (Germany)		SPA (Belgium)		RBR (Austria)		SIL (United Kingdom)		CAT (Spain)		MNZ (Italy)		Points

==== Am ====
Pos.	Driver	Team	LEC (France)		HOC (Germany)		SPA (Belgium)		RBR (Austria)		SIL (United Kingdom)		CAT (Spain)		MNZ (Italy)		Points
1	(Italy) Giuseppe Cipriani	(Italy) Antonelli MotorSport	2	2	Ret	2	2	Ret	3	2	2	Ret	1	1	4	1	45
2	(Austria) Alexander Hrachowina (Austria) Martin Konrad	(Germany) HTP Motorsport	1	1	1	1	Ret	2	1	1					3	Ret	41
3	(Portugal) "Manuel da Costa" (Portugal) "Miguel Sardinha"	(Portugal) Sports and you	4	4	2	3	3	Ret			1	1			2	Ret	29
4	(Italy) Davide Roda	(Italy) Antonelli MotorSport	3	3	Ret	DNS	1	1	2	3	Ret	DNS					23
5	(United Kingdom) Janine Hill (United States) John Shoffner	(Germany) GetSpeed Performance			3	4	4	3					2	2			18
6	(France) Pierre Feligioni (France) Claude-Yves Gosselin	(Belgium) Boutsen Ginion											3	3			6
7	(Poland) Stanislaw Jedinski	(Poland) Olimp Racing							4	4			4	Ret			6
8	(Spain) Eliseo Martínez	(Italy) Lazarus Racing													Ret	2	4
Entries ineligible to score points
	(Brazil) Oswaldo Negri (Puerto Rico) Francesco Piovanetti	(Switzerland) Spirit of Race													1	3	
	(Poland) Andrzej Lewandowski	(Italy) Lazarus Racing													Ret	2	
Pos.	Driver	Team	LEC (France)		HOC (Germany)		SPA (Belgium)		RBR (Austria)		SIL (United Kingdom)		CAT (Spain)		MNZ (Italy)		Points

=== Teams' Championship ===
Only the highest two finishing cars from a team count towards the Teams' Championship

Pos.	Team	Manufacturer	No.	LEC (France)		HOC (Germany)		SPA (Belgium)		RBR (Austria)		SIL (United Kingdom)		CAT (Spain)		MNZ (Italy)		Points
1	(Switzerland) Emil Frey Racing	Lamborghini	14	Ret	1	7	1	1	9	7	19	2	3	4	1	5	3	145
1	(Switzerland) Emil Frey Racing	Lamborghini	63	1	4	5	2	4	Ret	1	5	1	1	11	2	4	4	145
2	(Spain) Teo Martín Motorsport	McLaren	16	7	DNS	13	18	14	13	8	9	Ret	DNS	13	10	11	6	134
2	(Spain) Teo Martín Motorsport	McLaren	17	3	DNS	1	14	Ret	1	4	2	5	2	1	8	6	2	134
2	(Spain) Teo Martín Motorsport	McLaren	59	2	7	4	5	3	2	3	4	4	6	3	4	Ret	1	134
3	(Germany) SPS Automotive Performance	Mercedes-AMG	10	4	3	9	4	2	7	9	3	3	5	10	7	1	10	64
3	(Germany) SPS Automotive Performance	Mercedes-AMG	20	9	16	3	11	9	3	14	6	7	12	12	16	17	8	64
4	(Italy) Antonelli MotorSport	Mercedes-AMG	6	6	2	Ret	Ret	13	Ret	19	18	16	8	2	6	2	5	31
4	(Italy) Antonelli MotorSport	Mercedes-AMG	8	15	18	Ret	16	16	DNS	17	16	15	Ret	15	17	16	14	31
4	(Italy) Antonelli MotorSport	Mercedes-AMG	9	17	19	Ret	Ret	15	14	15	17	Ret	DNS					31
5	(United Kingdom) Optimum Motorsport	Aston Martin	96	11	6	8	3			6	1	Ret	7	Ret	5	3	7	29
6	(Czech Republic) Senkyr Motorsport	BMW	3							2	7	8	4	7	9			12
7	(Switzerland) Spirit of Race	Ferrari	21	12	9	2	9					10	10			Ret	9	8
8	(Italy) Lazarus Racing	Lamborghini	26	19	10			11	6	Ret	Ret							8
8	(Italy) Lazarus Racing	Lamborghini	27	17	11	14	6	7	4	11	13	13	11	17	14	Ret	16	8
9	(Portugal) Sports and you	Mercedes-AMG	22											16	3			6
9	(Portugal) Sports and you	Mercedes-AMG	99	20	20	18	19	17	Ret			14	15			14	Ret	6
10	(Italy) Vincenzo Sospiri Racing	Lamborghini	66	10	13	12	8	8	10	5	11	9	9	5	22	7	11	6
11	(Italy) Raton Racing by Target	Lamborghini	19	8	5	Ret	10	20	15	10	14	6	13	14	15	9	12	5
11	(Italy) Raton Racing by Target	Lamborghini	90	14	12	16	17	12	18					9	18	10	15	5
12	(United States) SunEnergy1 Racing	Mercedes-AMG	75	9	14	17	21	6	5	13	10							5
13	(Italy) Imperiale Racing	Lamborghini	34					5	8									3
14	(Germany) HTP Motorsport	Mercedes-AMG	25	13	17	15	15	Ret	16	12	15					15	Ret	2
15	(Germany) Winward Racing	Mercedes-AMG	33			6	7					12	Ret	6	13			2
16	(Switzerland) Kessel Racing	Ferrari	50									11	14					0
17	(Italy) Ombra Racing	Lamborghini	12	16	15	11	13	19	11			Ret	Ret	18	12	8	Ret	0
18	(Italy) Petri Corse	Bentley	7	Ret	DNS													0
19	(United Kingdom) Tempesta Racing	Ferrari	93	Ret	8	10	12	10	12	16	12							0
20	(Poland) Olimp Racing	Mercedes-AMG	5							18	20			21	Ret			0
20	(Poland) Olimp Racing	Audi	77							Ret	8			22	21			0
21	(Germany) GetSpeed Performance	Mercedes-AMG	11			19	20	18	17					19	19			0
21	(Germany) GetSpeed Performance	Mercedes-AMG	13											8	11			0
22	(Belgium) Boutsen Ginion	Lamborghini	4											20	20			0
Entries ineligible to score points
	(Germany) Frikadelli Racing	Porsche	31													12	13	
	(Switzerland) Spirit of Race	Ferrari	51													13	17	
Pos.	Driver	Team		LEC (France)		HOC (Germany)		SPA (Belgium)		RBR (Austria)		SIL (United Kingdom)		CAT (Spain)		MNZ (Italy)		Points
