= 2024 24 Hours of Daytona =

62nd 24 Hours of Daytona race

Previous: 2023	Next: 2025
Index: Races | Winners

Map of the Daytona International Speedway combined road course

The 2024 24 Hours of Daytona (formally known as the 2024 Rolex 24 at Daytona) was an endurance sports car race sanctioned by International Motor Sports Association (IMSA). The race was held at Daytona International Speedway combined road course in Daytona Beach, Florida on January 27–28, 2024. The event was the 62nd running of the 24 Hours of Daytona since its inception in 1962, and the first of 11 races across multiple classes in the 2024 IMSA SportsCar Championship, as well as the first of five rounds in the 2024 Michelin Endurance Cup. The 2024 race was shortened due to an officiating error causing the race to end 1 minute 35.277 seconds short of the scheduled 24 hours.

== Background ==
Daytona International Speedway, where the race was held

=== Preview ===
NASCAR founder Bill France Sr., who built Daytona International Speedway in 1959, conceived of the 24 Hours of Daytona to attract European sports-car endurance racing to the United States and provide international exposure to the speedway. It is informally considered part of the Triple Crown of Endurance Racing, with the 12 Hours of Sebring and the 24 Hours of Le Mans.

International Motor Sports Association (IMSA) president John Doonan confirmed the race was a part of the 2024 IMSA SportsCar Championship (IMSA SCC) in August 2023. It was the eleventh consecutive year it will be a part of the IMSA SCC, and the 62nd 24 Hours of Daytona. The 24 Hours of Daytona was the first of eleven scheduled sports car endurance races by IMSA, and the first of five races on the Michelin Endurance Cup (MEC). The race took place at the 12-turn 3.56-mile (5.73 km) Daytona International Speedway in Daytona Beach, Florida from January 27 to 28.

=== Filming ===
The Rolex 24 was used as a filming set for F1. Brad Pitt's run around Daytona in the #120 Wright Motorsports Porsche 911 GT3 R (992) car was inserted into racing scenes filmed from the actual race. The car carried the livery of the fictional "Chip Hart Racing" team and was shared with ‘Cale Kelso’ and former Porsche factory driver Patrick Long.

== Entry list ==
No.	Entrant	Car	Driver 1	Driver 2	Driver 3	Driver 4
GTP (Grand Touring Prototype) (10 entries)
01	(United States) Cadillac Racing	Cadillac V-Series.R	(France) Sébastien Bourdais	(New Zealand) Scott Dixon	(Netherlands) Renger van der Zande	(Spain) Álex Palou
5	(Germany) Proton Competition Mustang Sampling	Porsche 963	(Italy) Gianmaria Bruni	(France) Romain Dumas	(Switzerland) Neel Jani	(Belgium) Alessio Picariello
6	(Germany) Porsche Penske Motorsport	Porsche 963	(France) Kévin Estre	(France) Mathieu Jaminet	(United Kingdom) Nick Tandy	(Belgium) Laurens Vanthoor
7	(Germany) Porsche Penske Motorsport	Porsche 963	(United States) Dane Cameron	(Australia) Matt Campbell	(Brazil) Felipe Nasr	(United States) Josef Newgarden
10	(United States) Wayne Taylor Racing with Andretti	Acura ARX-06	(Portugal) Filipe Albuquerque	(Sweden) Marcus Ericsson	(New Zealand) Brendon Hartley	(United States) Ricky Taylor
24	(United States) BMW M Team RLL	BMW M Hybrid V8	(Austria) Philipp Eng	(Brazil) Augusto Farfus	(Finland) Jesse Krohn	(Belgium) Dries Vanthoor
25	(United States) BMW M Team RLL	BMW M Hybrid V8	(United States) Connor De Phillippi	(Belgium) Maxime Martin	(Germany) René Rast	(United Kingdom) Nick Yelloly
31	(United States) Whelen Cadillac Racing	Cadillac V-Series.R	(United Kingdom) Jack Aitken	(United Kingdom) Tom Blomqvist	(Brazil) Pipo Derani	
40	(United States) Wayne Taylor Racing with Andretti	Acura ARX-06	(United Kingdom) Jenson Button	(Switzerland) Louis Delétraz	(United States) Colton Herta	(United States) Jordan Taylor
85	(United States) JDC–Miller MotorSports	Porsche 963	(United Kingdom) Phil Hanson	(Netherlands) Tijmen van der Helm	(United States) Ben Keating	(United Kingdom) Richard Westbrook
LMP2 (Le Mans Prototype 2) (13 entries)
04	(United States) CrowdStrike Racing by APR	Oreca 07-Gibson	(United States) Colin Braun	(Denmark) Malthe Jakobsen	(United States) George Kurtz	(United Kingdom) Toby Sowery
2	(United States) United Autosports USA	Oreca 07-Gibson	(United Kingdom) Ben Hanley	(United States) Ben Keating	(Mexico) Pato O'Ward	(Chile) Nico Pino
8	(United States) Tower Motorsports	Oreca 07-Gibson	(United States) Michael Dinan	(Canada) John Farano	(Austria) Ferdinand Habsburg	(New Zealand) Scott McLaughlin
11	(France) TDS Racing	Oreca 07-Gibson	(Denmark) Mikkel Jensen	(New Zealand) Hunter McElrea	(France) Charles Milesi	(United States) Steven Thomas
18	(United States) Era Motorsport	Oreca 07-Gibson	(United Kingdom) Ryan Dalziel	(United States) Dwight Merriman	(Denmark) Christian Rasmussen	(United States) Connor Zilisch
20	(Denmark) MDK by High Class Racing	Oreca 07-Gibson	(Denmark) Dennis Andersen	(Germany) Laurents Hörr	(United States) Scott Huffaker	(United States) Seth Lucas
22	(United States) United Autosports USA	Oreca 07-Gibson	(United Kingdom) Paul di Resta	(United States) Bijoy Garg	(United States) Dan Goldburg	(Sweden) Felix Rosenqvist
33	(United States) Sean Creech Motorsport	Ligier JS P217-Gibson	(Portugal) João Barbosa	(United Kingdom) Jonny Edgar	(United States) Nolan Siegel	(United States) Lance Willsey
52	(Poland) Inter Europol by PR1/Mathiasen Motorsports	Oreca 07-Gibson	(United States) Nick Boulle	(France) Tom Dillmann	(Brazil) Pietro Fittipaldi	(Poland) Jakub Śmiechowski
74	(United States) Riley	Oreca 07-Gibson	(Australia) Josh Burdon	(Brazil) Felipe Fraga	(Brazil) Felipe Massa	(United States) Gar Robinson
81	(United States) DragonSpeed	Oreca 07-Gibson	(Australia) James Allen	(Mexico) Sebastián Álvarez	(United States) Eric Lux	(Cayman Islands) Kyffin Simpson
88	(Italy) Richard Mille AF Corse	Oreca 07-Gibson	(Denmark) Nicklas Nielsen	(Argentina) Luis Pérez Companc	(France) Matthieu Vaxivière	(France) Lilou Wadoux
99	(United States) AO Racing	Oreca 07-Gibson	(Australia) Matthew Brabham	(France) Paul-Loup Chatin	(United States) P. J. Hyett	(United Kingdom) Alex Quinn
GTD Pro (GT Daytona Pro) (13 entries)
1	(United States) Paul Miller Racing	BMW M4 GT3	(South Africa) Sheldon van der Linde	(United States) Bryan Sellers	(United States) Madison Snow	(United States) Neil Verhagen
3	(United States) Corvette Racing by Pratt Miller Motorsports	Chevrolet Corvette Z06 GT3.R	(Spain) Antonio García	(Spain) Daniel Juncadella	(United Kingdom) Alexander Sims	
4	(United States) Corvette Racing by Pratt Miller Motorsports	Chevrolet Corvette Z06 GT3.R	(New Zealand) Earl Bamber	(Netherlands) Nicky Catsburg	(United States) Tommy Milner	
9	(Canada) Pfaff Motorsports	McLaren 720S GT3 Evo	(Canada) James Hinchcliffe	(United Kingdom) Oliver Jarvis	(Germany) Marvin Kirchhöfer	(United States) Alexander Rossi
14	(United States) Vasser Sullivan	Lexus RC F GT3	(United Kingdom) Ben Barnicoat	(United Kingdom) Mike Conway	(United Kingdom) Jack Hawksworth	(United States) Kyle Kirkwood
19	(Italy) Iron Lynx	Lamborghini Huracán GT3 Evo 2	(Italy) Mirko Bortolotti	(Italy) Andrea Caldarelli	(South Africa) Jordan Pepper	(France) Franck Perera
23	(United States) Heart of Racing Team	Aston Martin Vantage AMR GT3 Evo	(Germany) Mario Farnbacher	(United Kingdom) Ross Gunn	(Spain) Alex Riberas	
60	(Italy) Iron Lynx	Lamborghini Huracán GT3 Evo 2	(Italy) Matteo Cairoli	(Italy) Matteo Cressoni	(France) Romain Grosjean	(Italy) Claudio Schiavoni
62	(United States) Risi Competizione	Ferrari 296 GT3	(United Kingdom) James Calado	(Italy) Alessandro Pier Guidi	(Italy) Davide Rigon	(Brazil) Daniel Serra
64	(Canada) Ford Multimatic Motorsports	Ford Mustang GT3	(Germany) Christopher Mies	(Germany) Mike Rockenfeller	(United Kingdom) Harry Tincknell	
65	(Canada) Ford Multimatic Motorsports	Ford Mustang GT3	(United States) Joey Hand	(Germany) Dirk Müller	(Belgium) Frédéric Vervisch	
75	(Australia) SunEnergy1 Racing	Mercedes-AMG GT3 Evo	(Germany) Maro Engel	(Andorra) Jules Gounon	(Australia) Kenny Habul	(Germany) Luca Stolz
77	(United States) AO Racing	Porsche 911 GT3 R (992)	(Denmark) Michael Christensen	(Germany) Laurin Heinrich	(United Kingdom) Sebastian Priaulx	
GTD (GT Daytona) (23 entries)
023	(United States) Triarsi Competizione	Ferrari 296 GT3	(Italy) Riccardo Agostini	(Italy) Alessio Rovera	(United States) Charlie Scardina	(United States) Onofrio Triarsi
12	(United States) Vasser Sullivan	Lexus RC F GT3	(Japan) Ritomo Miyata	(United States) Frankie Montecalvo	(United States) Aaron Telitz	(Canada) Parker Thompson
13	(Canada) AWA	Chevrolet Corvette Z06 GT3.R	(United Kingdom) Matt Bell	(Canada) Orey Fidani	(Germany) Lars Kern	(United Kingdom) Alex Lynn
17	(Canada) AWA	Chevrolet Corvette Z06 GT3.R	(Republic of Ireland) Charlie Eastwood	(Canada) Anthony Mantella	(United States) Thomas Merrill	(Argentina) Nicolás Varrone
21	(Italy) AF Corse	Ferrari 296 GT3	(Japan) Kei Cozzolino	(France) François Heriau	(United Kingdom) Simon Mann	(Spain) Miguel Molina
27	(United States) Heart of Racing Team	Aston Martin Vantage AMR GT3 Evo	(Canada) Roman De Angelis	(United Kingdom) Ian James	(Canada) Zacharie Robichon	(Denmark) Marco Sørensen
32	(United States) Korthoff/Preston Motorsports	Mercedes-AMG GT3 Evo	(Germany) Maximilian Götz	(Canada) Mikaël Grenier	(United States) Kenton Koch	(United States) Mike Skeen
34	(United States) Conquest Racing	Ferrari 296 GT3	(Italy) Alessandro Balzan	(Spain) Albert Costa	(United States) Manny Franco	(Monaco) Cédric Sbirrazzuoli
43	(United States) Andretti Motorsports	Porsche 911 GT3 R (992)	(United States) Jarett Andretti	(Colombia) Gabby Chaves	(Canada) Scott Hargrove	(Austria) Thomas Preining
44	(United States) Magnus Racing	Aston Martin Vantage AMR GT3 Evo	(United States) Andy Lally	(United States) John Potter	(United States) Spencer Pumpelly	(Denmark) Nicki Thiim
45	(United States) Wayne Taylor Racing with Andretti	Lamborghini Huracán GT3 Evo 2	(United States) Graham Doyle	(Costa Rica) Danny Formal	(United States) Ashton Harrison	(Canada) Kyle Marcelli
47	(Italy) Cetilar Racing	Ferrari 296 GT3	(Italy) Eddie Cheever III	(Italy) Antonio Fuoco	(Italy) Roberto Lacorte	(Italy) Giorgio Sernagiotto
55	(Germany) Proton Competition	Ford Mustang GT3	(United States) Ryan Hardwick	(Italy) Giammarco Levorato	(United States) Corey Lewis	(Norway) Dennis Olsen
57	(United States) Winward Racing	Mercedes-AMG GT3 Evo	(Netherlands) Indy Dontje	(Switzerland) Philip Ellis	(Canada) Daniel Morad	(United States) Russell Ward
66	(United States) Gradient Racing	Acura NSX GT3 Evo22	(Colombia) Tatiana Calderón	(United Kingdom) Katherine Legge	(United Kingdom) Stevan McAleer	(United States) Sheena Monk
70	(United Kingdom) Inception Racing	McLaren 720S GT3 Evo	(United Kingdom) Tom Gamble	(United States) Brendan Iribe	(United Kingdom) Ollie Millroy	(Denmark) Frederik Schandorff
78	(United States) Forte Racing	Lamborghini Huracán GT3 Evo 2	(Canada) Devlin DeFrancesco	(Canada) Misha Goikhberg	(United Kingdom) Sandy Mitchell	(Italy) Loris Spinelli
80	(United States) Lone Star Racing	Mercedes-AMG GT3 Evo	(Angola) Rui Andrade	(Australia) Scott Andrews	(United Kingdom) Adam Christodoulou	(Turkey) Salih Yoluç
83	(Italy) Iron Dames	Lamborghini Huracán GT3 Evo 2	(Belgium) Sarah Bovy	(Switzerland) Rahel Frey	(Denmark) Michelle Gatting	(France) Doriane Pin
86	(United States) MDK Motorsports	Porsche 911 GT3 R (992)	(Austria) Klaus Bachler	(Denmark) Anders Fjordbach	(China) Kerong Li	(Netherlands) Larry ten Voorde
92	(United States) Kellymoss with Riley	Porsche 911 GT3 R (992)	(France) Julien Andlauer	(United States) David Brule	(United States) Trent Hindman	(United States) Alec Udell
96	(United States) Turner Motorsport	BMW M4 GT3	(United States) Robby Foley	(United States) Patrick Gallagher	(Germany) Jens Klingmann	(United States) Jake Walker
120	(United States) Wright Motorsports	Porsche 911 GT3 R (992)	(United States) Adam Adelson	(Belgium) Jan Heylen	(France) Frédéric Makowiecki	(United States) Elliott Skeer

== Testing ==
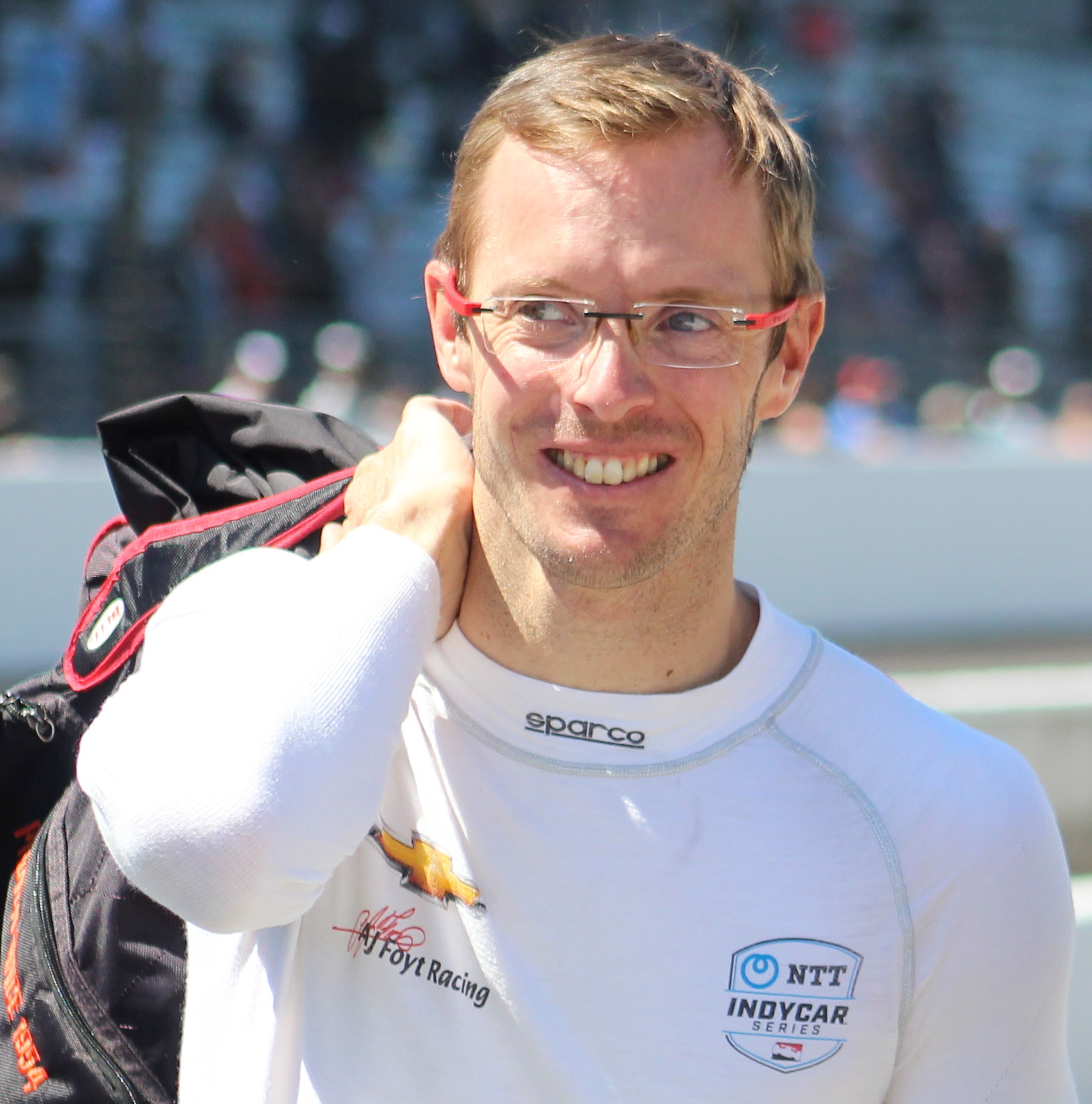
Sébastien Bourdais (pictured in 2021) set the fastest overall lap in testing for Cadillac Racing.

The Roar Before the 24 Tests occurred from January 19 to 21, 2024, with all cars participating in the test. The first session on Friday morning saw Nick Tandy top the lap times in the No. 6 Penske 963 with a time of 1:35.617, 0.035 seconds faster than Augusto Farfus' No. 24 BMW. Paul di Resta's No. 22 United Autosports car topped LMP2 with a 1-minute, 39.916 seconds lap. Matteo Cressoni was fastest in GTD Pro while Katherine Legge set the fastest time amongst all GTD cars. The second session on Friday afternoon saw Cadillac move atop when Pipo Derani, driving the No. 31 car for Action Express Racing, turned in a 1:35.217 lap in the closing minutes. De Phillippi's No. 25 BMW was second and Laurens Vanthoor was third for Porsche Penske Motorsport. Christian Rasmussen bettered LMP2's fastest lap with a time of 1:39.674, leading Era Motorsport's No. 18 entry ahead of Nolan Siegel's No. 33 Sean Creech Motorsport Ligier and Nicklas Nielsen's No. 88 AF Corse car. Ford led GTD Pro with Christopher Mies' lap of 1 minute 46.494 seconds, followed by James Calado's No. 62 Ferrari and Alexander Sims' No. 3 Corvette. Jan Heylen's No. 120 Porsche led GTD from Manny Franco's Conquest Racing Ferrari.

Hanson set the fastest overall lap (1:35.216) on the second day; Neel Jani's Proton Competition car was second and Connor De Phillippi's No. 25 BMW was third. Scott Huffaker led in LMP2, at 1:38.270 driving HCR's car. Milner's No. 4 Corvette led in GTD Pro with a 1:45.844 lap during the morning session while Eddie Cheever III's No. 47 Ferrari set the fastest time amongst all GTD cars.

The third and final day of testing featured one session where only the GTP cars participated. Bourdais' No. 01 CGR Cadillac set the overall fastest time with a 1-minute, 33.236 seconds lap. The second-fastest car was the No. 7 Penske Porsche of Nasr and Derani putting the No. 31 Whelen Cadillac in third position. Connor De Phillippi set the fourth-fastest lap in BMW's No. 25 car, and Louis Delétraz's No. 40 Acura was fifth.

== Practice ==
There were four practice sessions scheduled preceding the start of the race on Saturday, three on Thursday and one on Friday. The first 90-minute session was on Thursday morning while the second session on Thursday afternoon ran for 105 minutes. The third scheduled for later that evening ran for 90 minutes; the fourth on Friday morning lasted an hour.

=== Practice 1 ===
Dixon's No. 01 Cadillac set the fastest lap of the first practice session at 1 minute, 36.012 seconds, 0.127 seconds faster than De Phillippi's No. 25 BMW. Kévin Estre put the No. 6 Penske Porsche in third overall. Dries Vanthoor was fourth in BMW's No. 24 car and Cameron's No. 7 Porsche was fifth. Toby Sowery led LMP2 with a 1:39.407 lap in CrowdStrike's No. 04 car, and Hanley's No. 2 United Autosports Oreca was second. In GTD Pro, the No. 14 Vasser Sullivan Lexus of Hawskworth led with a lap of 1 minute, 46.783 seconds. Marvin Kirchhöfer put the No. 9 Pfaff McLaren second. Calado in the No. 62 Risi Ferrari was third. Katherine Legge's No. 66 Gradient car set the fastest time amongst all GTD cars. Robby Foley set the second-fastest lap in class in Turner Motorsport's No. 96 entry.

Pos.	Class	No.	Team	Driver	Time	Gap
1	GTP	01	(United States) Cadillac Racing	(New Zealand) Scott Dixon	1:36.012	—
2	GTP	25	(United States) BMW M Team RLL	(United States) Connor De Phillippi	1:36.139	+0.127
3	GTP	6	(Germany) Porsche Penske Motorsport	(France) Kévin Estre	1:36.281	+0.269

=== Practice 2 ===
In the second session, Palou's No. 01 CGR Cadillac lapped quickest at 1:35.589, ahead of the No. 7 PPM Porsche of Felipe Nasr and Bruni's No. 5 Proton car. WCR were fourth after a lap by Aitken, and Mathieu Jaminet's No. 6 PPM Porsche was fifth. Novalak led in LMP2 with a 1:39.416 lap in PR1's car, 0.081 seconds ahead of James Allen's DragonSpeed car. Rossi's 1:47.144 lap led the GTD Pro class in Pfaff's car, 0.164 seconds faster than Daniel Serra's Risi Ferrari; Laurin Heinrich's No. 77 AO Porsche was third. Klaus Bachler's No. 86 MDK Porsche recorded the fastest lap amongst all GTD cars: 1:47.045, 0.040 seconds faster than Olsen's No. 55 Proton Ford.

Pos.	Class	No.	Team	Driver	Time	Gap
1	GTP	01	(United States) Cadillac Racing	(Spain) Álex Palou	1:35.589	—
2	GTP	7	(Germany) Porsche Penske Motorsport	(Brazil) Felipe Nasr	1:35.724	+0.135
3	GTP	5	(Germany) Proton Competition Mustang Sampling	(Italy) Gianmaria Bruni	1:35.754	+0.165

=== Practice 3 ===
The third practice session ran at night and saw Derani's No. 31 Cadillac set the fastest overall lap of 1 minute, 35.708 seconds. Nasr was more than three-tenths behind in second, with the No. 01 CGR Cadillac of Bourdais in third. Connor De Phillippi in the No. 25 BMW was fourth. Burdon caused a stoppage early when he stopped the No. 74 Riley car on the track with a puncture. Jakobsen's CrowdStrike Oreca led LMP2 with a 1:39.166 lap, faster than O'Ward's No. 2 United Autosports vehicle. Chevrolet occupied first and second in GTD Pro with Bamber faster than his teammate Sims by less than one-tenth of a second. Porsche paced GTD with MDK's 911 of Larry ten Voorde lapping at 1:47.075, ahead of Danny Formal's No. 45 WTR Lamborghini.

Pos.	Class	No.	Team	Driver	Time	Gap
1	GTP	31	(United States) Whelen Cadillac Racing	(Brazil) Pipo Derani	1:35.708	—
2	GTP	7	(Germany) Porsche Penske Motorsport	(Brazil) Felipe Nasr	1:36.018	+0.310
3	GTP	01	(United States) Cadillac Racing	(France) Sébastien Bourdais	1:36.109	+0.401

=== Practice 4 ===
Jack Aitken led the last practice session in the No. 31 WCR car with a lap of 1 minute, 35.983 seconds. De Phillippi's No. 25 BMW was second-fastest. The No. 01 Cadillac of Bourdais set the third-quickest lap. Westbrook's No. 85 Porsche, along with Jani's No. 5 Proton Competition car were fourth and fifth. Lance Willsey damaged the No. 33 Sean Creech Motorsport Ligier in an accident at turn 2 and stopped the session for 6 minutes. Jensen led in LMP2 for TDS Racing with a 1-minute, 39.078 lap, from AF Corse's Matthieu Vaxivière and Era Motorsport's Ryan Dalziel. Cairoli's No. 60 Lamborghini paced GTD Pro with a 1:47.239 lap, 0.147 seconds faster than Serra's Risi Ferrari. Preining set the fastest time amongst all GTD cars, followed by Jens Klingmann's No. 96 Turner Motorsport car.

Pos.	Class	No.	Team	Driver	Time	Gap
1	GTP	31	(United States) Whelen Cadillac Racing	(United Kingdom) Jack Aitken	1:35.983	—
2	GTP	25	(United States) BMW M Team RLL	(United States) Connor De Phillippi	1:36.222	+0.239
3	GTP	01	(United States) Cadillac Racing	(France) Sébastien Bourdais	1:36.469	+0.486

== Qualifying ==
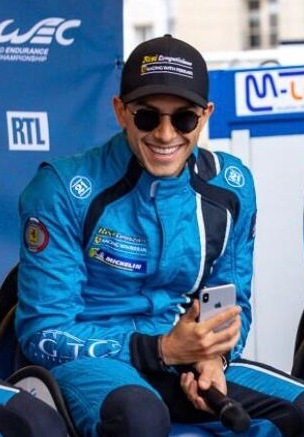
Pipo Derani (pictured in 2019) took the overall pole position for Whelen Cadillac Racing.

Sunday's afternoon qualifying was broken into three sessions, with one session for the GTP, LMP2, and the GTD classes, which lasted 15 minutes each. The rules dictated that all teams nominated a driver to qualify their cars, with the Pro-Am LMP2 class requiring a Bronze rated driver to qualify the car. The competitors' fastest lap times determined the starting order. IMSA then arranged the grid to put GTPs ahead of the LMP2, GTD Pro, and GTD cars.

Pipo Derani in the No. 31 Cadillac broke the Daytona International Speedway Road Course lap record to clinch pole position with a time of 1-minute, 32.656 seconds. He was joined on the grid's front row by Bourdais whose best lap in the No. 01 CGR Cadillac was 0.071 seconds slower. Nasr qualified the No. 7 Porsche third, and Connor De Phillippi in the No. 25 BMW took fourth. The WTR duo of Delétraz and Filipe Albuquerque qualified fifth and sixth. The Proton Competition Porsche did not participate in qualifying after Neel Jani crashed the car during the final Roar session.

Keating took the LMP2 pole for United Autosports with a 1:38.501 time. Nick Boulle's No. 52 PR1 car was second and George Kurtz took third for CrowdStrike.

In the GT session, Sebastian Priaulx set a new qualifying track record for GTD Pro to take pole position for AO Racing, with a lap of 1:44.382. Prialux was 0.080 seconds faster than Hawksworth's second placed No. 14 Lexus. García qualified the No. 3 Corvette third. The fastest Lamborghini was Perera's No. 19 Huracán GT3 Evo 2 in fourth, and the highest-placed Ferrari was Serra's fifth-placed No. 62 296 GT3. Lexus led GTD, with Parker Thompson setting a new class record with a 1-minute 44.494 lap. Klaus Bachler's No. 86 MDK Porsche qualified second, and Katherine Legge's No. 66 Acura took third. Rounding out the top five in the class were the No. 45 WTR Lamborghini of Kyle Marcelli, and Loris Spinelli's No. 78 Forte Racing Lamborghini. The No. 92 Kellymoss Porsche failed to record a time after David Brule crashed at turn three on his outlap.

=== Qualifying results ===
Pole positions in each class are indicated in bold and with ‡.

Pos.	Class	No.	Entry	Driver	Time	Gap	Grid
1	**GTP**	**31**	**(United States) Whelen Cadillac Racing**	**(Brazil) Pipo Derani**	**1:32.656**	—	1‡
2	GTP	01	(United States) Cadillac Racing	(France) Sébastien Bourdais	1:32.727	+0.071	2
3	GTP	7	(Germany) Porsche Penske Motorsport	(Brazil) Felipe Nasr	1:32.876	+0.220	3
4	GTP	25	(United States) BMW M Team RLL	(United States) Connor De Phillippi	1:33.022	+0.366	4
5	GTP	40	(United States) Wayne Taylor Racing with Andretti	(Switzerland) Louis Delétraz	1:33.100	+0.444	5
6	GTP	10	(United States) Wayne Taylor Racing with Andretti	(Portugal) Filipe Albuquerque	1:33.347	+0.691	6
7	GTP	6	(Germany) Porsche Penske Motorsport	(United Kingdom) Nick Tandy	1:33.381	+0.725	7
8	GTP	24	(United States) BMW M Team RLL	(Finland) Jesse Krohn	1:33.499	+0.843	8
9	GTP	85	(United States) JDC–Miller MotorSports	(Netherlands) Tijmen van der Helm	1:33.506	+0.850	9
10	**LMP2**	**2**	**(United States) United Autosports USA**	**(United States) Ben Keating**	**1:38.501**	**+5.845**	11‡
11	LMP2	52	(Poland) Inter Europol by PR1/Mathiasen Motorsports	(United States) Nick Boulle	1:38.603	+5.947	12
12	LMP2	04	(United States) CrowdStrike Racing by APR	(United States) George Kurtz	1:39.252	+6.596	13
13	LMP2	74	(United States) Riley	(United States) Gar Robinson	1:39.297	+6.641	14
14	LMP2	22	(United States) United Autosports USA	(United States) Dan Goldburg	1:39.506	+6.850	15
15	LMP2	11	(France) TDS Racing	(United States) Steven Thomas	1:39.523	+6.867	16
16	LMP2	99	(United States) AO Racing	(United States) P. J. Hyett	1:39.679	+7.023	17
17	LMP2	20	(Denmark) MDK by High Class Racing	(Denmark) Dennis Andersen	1:40.030	+7.374	18
18	LMP2	81	(United States) DragonSpeed	(United States) Eric Lux	1:40.380	+7.724	19
19	LMP2	88	(Italy) Richard Mille AF Corse	(Argentina) Luis Pérez Companc	1:40.577	+7.921	20
20	LMP2	18	(United States) Era Motorsport	(United States) Dwight Merriman	1:41.196	+8.540	21
21	LMP2	33	(United States) Sean Creech Motorsport	(United States) Lance Willsey	1:41.496	+8.840	22
22	LMP2	8	(United States) Tower Motorsports	(Canada) John Farano	1:41.588	+8.932	23
23	**GTD Pro**	**77**	**(United States) AO Racing**	**(United Kingdom) Sebastian Priaulx**	**1:44.382**	**+11.726**	24‡
24	GTD Pro	14	(United States) Vasser Sullivan	(United Kingdom) Jack Hawksworth	1:44.462	+11.806	25
25	**GTD**	**12**	**(United States) Vasser Sullivan**	**(Canada) Parker Thompson**	**1:44.494**	**+11.838**	26‡
26	GTD	86	(United States) MDK Motorsports	(Austria) Klaus Bachler	1:44.537	+11.881	27
27	GTD	66	(United States) Gradient Racing	(United Kingdom) Katherine Legge	1:44.640	+11.984	28
28	GTD	45	(United States) Wayne Taylor Racing with Andretti	(Canada) Kyle Marcelli	1:44.707	+12.051	29
29	GTD	78	(United States) Forte Racing	(Italy) Loris Spinelli	1:44.709	+12.053	30
30	GTD	34	(United States) Conquest Racing	(Spain) Albert Costa	1:44.722	+12.066	31
31	GTD Pro	3	(United States) Corvette Racing by Pratt Miller Motorsports	(Spain) Antonio García	1:44.786	+12.130	32
32	GTD	47	(Italy) Cetilar Racing	(Italy) Antonio Fuoco	1:44.811	+12.155	33
33	GTD Pro	19	(Italy) Iron Lynx	(France) Franck Perera	1:44.831	+12.175	34
34	GTD Pro	62	(United States) Risi Competizione	(Brazil) Daniel Serra	1:44.831	+12.175	35
35	GTD	023	(United States) Triarsi Competizione	(Italy) Alessio Rovera	1:44.835	+12.179	36
36	GTD Pro	9	(Canada) Pfaff Motorsports	(United Kingdom) Oliver Jarvis	1:44.900	+12.244	37
37	GTD	17	(Canada) AWA	(Argentina) Nicolás Varrone	1:44.959	+12.303	38
38	GTD	70	(United Kingdom) Inception Racing	(Denmark) Frederik Schandorff	1:44.965	+12.309	39
39	GTD	21	(Italy) AF Corse	(Spain) Miguel Molina	1:45.041	+12.385	40
40	GTD	43	(United States) Andretti Motorsports	(Austria) Thomas Preining	1:45.115	+12.459	41
41	GTD	83	(Italy) Iron Dames	(Denmark) Michelle Gatting	1:45.180	+12.524	42
42	GTD	13	(Canada) AWA	(United Kingdom) Matt Bell	1:45.206	+12.550	43
43	GTD Pro	4	(United States) Corvette Racing by Pratt Miller Motorsports	(United States) Tommy Milner	1:45.215	+12.559	44
44	GTD Pro	60	(Italy) Iron Lynx	(France) Romain Grosjean	1:45.305	+12.649	45
45	GTD Pro	65	(Canada) Ford Multimatic Motorsports	(Germany) Dirk Müller	1:45.373	+12.717	46
46	GTD Pro	75	(Australia) SunEnergy1 Racing	(Germany) Maro Engel	1:45.421	+12.765	47
47	GTD Pro	23	(United States) Heart of Racing Team	(United Kingdom) Ross Gunn	1:45.528	+12.872	48
48	GTD	55	(Germany) Proton Competition	(Norway) Dennis Olsen	1:45.536	+12.880	49
49	GTD	1	(United States) Paul Miller Racing	(United States) Madison Snow	1:45.831	+13.175	50
50	GTD Pro	64	(Canada) Ford Multimatic Motorsports	(United Kingdom) Harry Tincknell	1:45.840	+13.184	51
51	GTD	96	(United States) Turner Motorsport	(United States) Patrick Gallagher	1:45.861	+13.205	52
52	GTD	57	(United States) Winward Racing	(Switzerland) Philip Ellis	1:45.898	+13.242	53
53	GTD	32	(United States) Korthoff/Preston Motorsports	(Canada) Mikaël Grenier	1:45.974	+13.318	54
54	GTD	120	(United States) Wright Motorsports	(United States) Adam Adelson	1:45.983	+13.327	55
55	GTD	80	(United States) Lone Star Racing	(United Kingdom) Adam Christodoulou	1:46.209	+13.553	56
56	GTD	44	(United States) Magnus Racing	(United States) John Potter	1:48.007	+15.351	57
57	GTD	27	(United States) Heart of Racing Team	(Canada) Roman De Angelis	1:52.715	+20.059	58
58	GTP	5	(Germany) Proton Competition Mustang Sampling	No Time Established^{1}			10
59	GTD	92	(United States) Kellymoss with Riley	No Time Established^{2}			59
Sources:

- ^{1} The No. 5 Proton Competition Mustang Sampling entry did not participate in qualifying after Neel Jani crashed the car during the sixth Roar session. By IMSA rules, the car started from the rear of the GTP class on the starting grid.
- ^{2} The No. 92 Kellymoss with Riley entry did not set a time after a crash by David Brule in the beginning of the GTD qualifying session.

== Race ==
=== Start and early hours ===
Racing began just past 1:40 p.m. EST, with movie producer Jerry Bruckheimer acting as the honorary starter. Pipo Derani in the No. 31 Whelen Engineering Cadillac Racing Cadillac took the early lead ahead of Felipe Nasr in the No. 7 Porsche Penske Motorsport Porsche. After only a few laps, the No. 01 Cadillac Racing Cadillac driven by Sébastien Bourdais moved into second. After roughly 30 minutes of running, the first full-course caution of the race came, after the No. 78 Forte Racing Lamborghini suffered an accident at the Le Mans Chicane. The No. 40 Wayne Taylor Racing with Andretti Acura moved into the lead during pit stops during this. The restart from the caution period was chaotic; three cars from the LMP2 class spun at the Le Mans Chicane. Only a few moments later, the No. 20 MDK by High Class Racing Oreca spun at turn 2 directly in to the path of the No. 14 Vasser Sullivan Lexus, causing a heavy collision between the two cars and bringing out another full course caution.

When racing resumed, the two Cadillacs took the lead of the race, with the No. 01 ahead of the No. 31. In the LMP2 class, United Autosports led with their No. 2 car, while the No. 9 Pfaff Motorsports McLaren and the No. 12 Vasser Sullivan Lexus led the GTD Pro and GTD classes respectively. Racing was again interrupted just before the two-hour mark, when the No. 11 TDS Racing Oreca crashed heavily at the exit of the Le Mans Chicane, putting the car out of the race immediately. More incidents dotted the early running. Just after the 4th hour began, the No. 33 Sean Creech Motorsports Ligier caused another full-course caution when it spun in turn 6 and stalled. The No. 9 Pfaff Motorsports McLaren in the GTD Pro class was forced into the garage area by a failure in a wheel hub on the car. The No. 88 Richard Mille AF Corse Oreca also went into the garage with mechanical issues and retired from the race shortly thereafter.

=== Night ===
As night fell, another caution came as the No. 33 Ligier stopped on track, this time with electrical problems. The ensuing pit stops under the caution allowed the No. 31 Cadillac to retake the lead, while the No. 04 CrowdStrike Racing Oreca took the LMP2 lead. The No. 77 AO Racing Porsche led GTD Pro at the end of five hours, while the No. 27 Heart of Racing Team Aston Martin led in GTD. As temperatures dropped, the No. 7 Porsche began to come to the front, moving past the No. 31 Cadillac to take the first lead for the car of the race. The 7th hour saw yet another caution caused by the No. 33 Ligier, after it came to stop on track with more electrical issues. A period of clean running came after, with just over two hours of green-flag racing. During this time, the No. 31 Cadillac moved back in to the lead with a pass by Pipo Derani in turn one. The battles in the GT classes had also become closer; in GTD Pro, the No. 62 Risi Competizione Ferrari and the No. 1 Paul Miller Racing BMW battled for the lead, while in GTD the No. 12 Vasser Sullivan Lexus and the No. 57 Winward Racing Mercedes fought for their class lead.

The first major drama in the leading GTP class came in the eighth hour, as the No. 10 Wayne Taylor Racing with Andretti Acura - which was running in third place at the time - came to a halt on track with a major electrical failure, with driver Filipe Albuquerque reporting a burning smell in the car. The No. 01 Cadillac saw problems during the ninth hour after suffering a puncture and falling a lap behind the leader while limping back to the pit lane. The No. 31 led for the majority of the remainder of the first half of the race. The No. 52 Inter Europol by PR1/Mathiasen Motorsports Oreca led LMP2, while the No. 62 Risi Competizione Ferrari led GTD Pro and the No. 70 Inception Racing McLaren led GTD. More cars met with technical issues just before halfway. The No. 27 Heart of Racing Team Aston Martin suffered electrical issues that cause it to stop on track briefly before ultimately restarting and heading to the garage area. The No. 40 Wayne Taylor Racing with Andretti Acura also stopped on track with electrical issues and caused a full-course caution, but ultimately restarted and returned to racing, albeit after falling off the lead lap.

In the early hours of Sunday, the No. 25 BMW M Team RLL BMW entered lead battle, briefly leading during the 14th hour of the race over the No. 31 Cadillac and both the No. 6 and No. 7 Porsches. Behind, trouble struck more competitor. The No. 24 BMW M Team RLL BMW suffered an electrical failure and stopped on circuit, triggering another full course caution. The No. 01 Cadillac also stopped on circuit during the 14th hour. The No. 01's problems were so severe that car retired from the race. In the 15th hour, the two Penske Porsches had managed to move to the lead, closely followed by the No. 31 Cadillac. The No. 25 BMW that had briefly led the race fell several laps behind the leaders as it was forced into the garage for mechanical issues. In LMP2, the No. 18 Era Motorsport Oreca had moved to the lead in class after much shuffling. GTD Pro remained fierce contested, with the battle between the No. 62 Ferrari and the No. 1 BMW now joined both the No. 3 and No. 4 Corvette Racing Chevrolets. The No. 57 Winward Racing Mercedes had moved to the lead of GTD.

=== Morning ===
A full-course caution started off the morning hours, with the No. 99 AO Racing LMP2 going off course and into the tire barriers at turn 3. The No. 6 Penske Porsche led with 6 hours to go, put was served a penalty for exceeding IMSA's mandated powertrain parameters for GTP cars, dropping it back. After another full course yellow, this time caused from debris left by the No. 33 Ligier, the No. 7 Porsche would soon take the lead as it passed the No. 31 Cadillac for the lead. In GTD Pro, drama hit Corvette Racing, as both of their cars went to the garage - the No. 3 for an oil leak and the No. 4 power steering failure. This left the No. 1 BMW leading ahead of the No. 62 Ferrari. In GTD, the No. 57 Mercedes continued to lead, now over the No. 023 Triarsi Competizione Ferrari. The No. 6 Porsche would effectively fall out of contention for the win in the 21st hour after sliding off course after a pit stop. Though it remained on the lead lap, it fell to the last GTP car on the lead lap will behind the remaining cars. LMP2 had become a five-way battle between the remaining cars on the lead lap, with the #18 Era Motorsports entry leading with 3 hours to go.

=== Finish ===
The battle to the finish remained between the No. 7 Penske Porsche and the No. 31 Whelen Engineering Cadillac. In the penultimate hour, the No. 31 retook the lead with a pass at turn 1, with the Cadillac seeming to handle the higher temperatures of daytime running better than the Porsche. In GTD Pro, the No. 1 BMW, which had been in the lead fight most of the race, suffered brake issues, resulting in a loose wheel and an off-track incident that put it two laps behind the no. 62 Ferrari. With the BMW losing time, the 62 Ferrari held a one lap lead over its closest competitor in the No. 77 AO Racing Porsche.

With just under one hour remaining, the race's final full-course caution came when the No. 12 Vasser Sullivan Lexus caught fire at the end of pit lane. During the caution, teams made their final scheduled pit stops, during which the No. 7 Porsche exited ahead of the No. 31 Cadillac, having saved enough fuel during the previous run to have a shorter pit stop. Racing resumed with roughly 30 minutes remaining, with the No. 31 attempting to catch the No. 7. The No. 7 would hold on for victory, giving Porsche their first major endurance race victory with the Porsche 963. It was also the first overall victory for Team Penske in the race since 1969. The No. 31 Whelen Engineering Cadillac held on for second, while the No. 40 Wayne Taylor Racing with Andretti Acura finished third despite its earlier electrical issues. In LMP2, the No. 18 Era Motorsport Oreca took victory after pulling out a sizeable lead over its competition in the final green flag run. In GTD Pro, the No. 62 Risi Competizione went unchallenged after the issues for the No. 1 BMW, coming to victory with a comfortable one lap advantage. In GTD, the No. 57 Winward Racing Mercedes took victory, the team's second in the race in four years.

The race ended with confusion among competitors, as the checkered flag to end the race was displayed with roughly 1 minute and 30 seconds remaining on the timing clock. By IMSA rules, the race was officially ended at the checkered flag, and so the official time of race was just shy of the full 24 hours.

== Post-race ==
The day following the race, IMSA organizers put out a notice admitting fault for the premature ending of the race. Organizers admitted to an officiating error in race control by announcing and displaying the white final lap flag too early, thereby forcing an early end to the race. The series also confirmed that by IMSA's rulebook, results would be taken from the time of the checkered flag ending the race being displayed.

On February 23, 2024, IMSA finalized the official results and standings for the race, with penalties applied for BMW and Ferrari entries in the GTD classes. Both manufacturers were found to not be in compliance with their permitted performance levels for the race, resulting in both manufacturers being stripped of all their manufacturer championship and MEC points. Furthermore, both BMW and Ferrari were fined $25,000 as part of the penalty.

Since it was the season's first race, Cameron, Campbell, Nasr, and Newgarden led the GTP Drivers' Championship with 380 points, ahead of Aitken, Blomqvist, and Derani by 25 points. Ryan Dalziel, Merriman, Rasmussen, and Zilisch led the LMP2 points standings, ahead of Braun, Jakobsen, Kurtz, and Sowery. Calado, Pier Guidi, Rigon, and Serra held the GTD Pro Drivers' Championship lead over Michael Christensen, Heinrich, and Prialux. In GTD, Dontje, Ellis, Morad, and Ward led the class points standings over Cozzolino, Heriau, Mann, and Molina. Porsche Penske, Era, Risi Competizione and Winward Racing became the leaders of their respective Teams' Championships. Porsche led the GTP and GTD Pro Manufacturers' Championships, with Mercedes-AMG leading the GTD Manufacturers' Championship, with 10 rounds remaining in the season.

== Results ==
Class winners denoted in bold and with ‡

Pos	Class	No.	Team / Entrant	Drivers	Chassis	Laps	Time/Retired
Pos	Class	No.	Team / Entrant	Drivers	Engine	Laps	Time/Retired
1	**GTP**	**7**	**(Germany) Porsche Penske Motorsport**	**(United States) Dane Cameron (Australia) Matt Campbell (Brazil) Felipe Nasr (United States) Josef Newgarden**	**Porsche 963**	**791**	**23:58:24.723‡**
1	**GTP**	**7**	**(Germany) Porsche Penske Motorsport**	**(United States) Dane Cameron (Australia) Matt Campbell (Brazil) Felipe Nasr (United States) Josef Newgarden**	**Porsche 9RD 4.6 L Twin-Turbo V8**	**791**	**23:58:24.723‡**
2	GTP	31	(United States) Whelen Cadillac Racing	(United Kingdom) Jack Aitken (United Kingdom) Tom Blomqvist (Brazil) Pipo Derani	Cadillac V-Series.R	791	+2.112
2	GTP	31	(United States) Whelen Cadillac Racing	(United Kingdom) Jack Aitken (United Kingdom) Tom Blomqvist (Brazil) Pipo Derani	Cadillac LMC55R 5.5 L V8	791	+2.112
3	GTP	40	(United States) Wayne Taylor Racing with Andretti	(United Kingdom) Jenson Button (Switzerland) Louis Delétraz (United States) Colton Herta (United States) Jordan Taylor	Acura ARX-06	791	+14.989
3	GTP	40	(United States) Wayne Taylor Racing with Andretti	(United Kingdom) Jenson Button (Switzerland) Louis Delétraz (United States) Colton Herta (United States) Jordan Taylor	Acura AR24e 2.4 L Twin-Turbo V6	791	+14.989
4	GTP	6	(Germany) Porsche Penske Motorsport	(France) Kévin Estre (France) Mathieu Jaminet (United Kingdom) Nick Tandy (Belgium) Laurens Vanthoor	Porsche 963	791	+15.387
4	GTP	6	(Germany) Porsche Penske Motorsport	(France) Kévin Estre (France) Mathieu Jaminet (United Kingdom) Nick Tandy (Belgium) Laurens Vanthoor	Porsche 9RD 4.6 L Twin-Turbo V8	791	+15.387
5	GTP	5	(Germany) Proton Competition Mustang Sampling	(Italy) Gianmaria Bruni (France) Romain Dumas (Switzerland) Neel Jani (Belgium) Alessio Picariello	Porsche 963	791	+44.479
5	GTP	5	(Germany) Proton Competition Mustang Sampling	(Italy) Gianmaria Bruni (France) Romain Dumas (Switzerland) Neel Jani (Belgium) Alessio Picariello	Porsche 9RD 4.6 L Twin-Turbo V8	791	+44.479
6	GTP	85	(United States) JDC–Miller MotorSports	(United Kingdom) Phil Hanson (Netherlands) Tijmen van der Helm (United States) Ben Keating (United Kingdom) Richard Westbrook	Porsche 963	789	+2 Laps
6	GTP	85	(United States) JDC–Miller MotorSports	(United Kingdom) Phil Hanson (Netherlands) Tijmen van der Helm (United States) Ben Keating (United Kingdom) Richard Westbrook	Porsche 9RD 4.6 L Twin-Turbo V8	789	+2 Laps
7	GTP	25	(United States) BMW M Team RLL	(United States) Connor De Phillippi (Belgium) Maxime Martin (Germany) René Rast (United Kingdom) Nick Yelloly	BMW M Hybrid V8	778	+13 Laps
7	GTP	25	(United States) BMW M Team RLL	(United States) Connor De Phillippi (Belgium) Maxime Martin (Germany) René Rast (United Kingdom) Nick Yelloly	BMW P66/3 4.0 L Twin-Turbo V8	778	+13 Laps
8	GTP	24	(United States) BMW M Team RLL	(Austria) Philipp Eng (Brazil) Augusto Farfus (Finland) Jesse Krohn (Belgium) Dries Vanthoor	BMW M Hybrid V8	776	+15 Laps
8	GTP	24	(United States) BMW M Team RLL	(Austria) Philipp Eng (Brazil) Augusto Farfus (Finland) Jesse Krohn (Belgium) Dries Vanthoor	BMW P66/3 4.0 L Twin-Turbo V8	776	+15 Laps
9	**LMP2**	**18**	**(United States) Era Motorsport**	**(United Kingdom) Ryan Dalziel (United States) Dwight Merriman (Denmark) Christian Rasmussen (United States) Connor Zilisch**	**Oreca 07**	**767**	**+24 Laps‡**
9	**LMP2**	**18**	**(United States) Era Motorsport**	**(United Kingdom) Ryan Dalziel (United States) Dwight Merriman (Denmark) Christian Rasmussen (United States) Connor Zilisch**	**Gibson GK428 4.2 L V8**	**767**	**+24 Laps‡**
10	LMP2	04	(United States) CrowdStrike Racing by APR	(United States) Colin Braun (Denmark) Malthe Jakobsen (United States) George Kurtz (United Kingdom) Toby Sowery	Oreca 07	767	+24 Laps
10	LMP2	04	(United States) CrowdStrike Racing by APR	(United States) Colin Braun (Denmark) Malthe Jakobsen (United States) George Kurtz (United Kingdom) Toby Sowery	Gibson GK428 4.2 L V8	767	+24 Laps
11	LMP2	74	(United States) Riley	(Australia) Josh Burdon (Brazil) Felipe Fraga (Brazil) Felipe Massa (United States) Gar Robinson	Oreca 07	767	+24 Laps
11	LMP2	74	(United States) Riley	(Australia) Josh Burdon (Brazil) Felipe Fraga (Brazil) Felipe Massa (United States) Gar Robinson	Gibson GK428 4.2 L V8	767	+24 Laps
12	LMP2	52	(Poland) Inter Europol by PR1/Mathiasen Motorsports	(United States) Nick Boulle (France) Tom Dillmann (Brazil) Pietro Fittipaldi (Poland) Jakub Śmiechowski	Oreca 07	767	+24 Laps
12	LMP2	52	(Poland) Inter Europol by PR1/Mathiasen Motorsports	(United States) Nick Boulle (France) Tom Dillmann (Brazil) Pietro Fittipaldi (Poland) Jakub Śmiechowski	Gibson GK428 4.2 L V8	767	+24 Laps
13	LMP2	8	(United States) Tower Motorsports	(United States) Michael Dinan (Canada) John Farano (Austria) Ferdinand Habsburg (New Zealand) Scott McLaughlin	Oreca 07	767	+24 Laps
13	LMP2	8	(United States) Tower Motorsports	(United States) Michael Dinan (Canada) John Farano (Austria) Ferdinand Habsburg (New Zealand) Scott McLaughlin	Gibson GK428 4.2 L V8	767	+24 Laps
14	LMP2	2	(United States) United Autosports USA	(United Kingdom) Ben Hanley (United States) Ben Keating (Mexico) Pato O'Ward (Chile) Nico Pino	Oreca 07	765	+26 Laps
14	LMP2	2	(United States) United Autosports USA	(United Kingdom) Ben Hanley (United States) Ben Keating (Mexico) Pato O'Ward (Chile) Nico Pino	Gibson GK428 4.2 L V8	765	+26 Laps
15	LMP2	81	(United States) DragonSpeed	(Australia) James Allen (Mexico) Sebastián Álvarez (United States) Eric Lux (Cayman Islands) Kyffin Simpson	Oreca 07	764	+27 Laps
15	LMP2	81	(United States) DragonSpeed	(Australia) James Allen (Mexico) Sebastián Álvarez (United States) Eric Lux (Cayman Islands) Kyffin Simpson	Gibson GK428 4.2 L V8	764	+27 Laps
16	LMP2	99	(United States) AO Racing	(Australia) Matthew Brabham (France) Paul-Loup Chatin (United States) P. J. Hyett (United Kingdom) Alex Quinn	Oreca 07	753	+38 Laps
16	LMP2	99	(United States) AO Racing	(Australia) Matthew Brabham (France) Paul-Loup Chatin (United States) P. J. Hyett (United Kingdom) Alex Quinn	Gibson GK428 4.2 L V8	753	+38 Laps
17	**GTD; Pro**	**62**	**(United States) Risi Competizione**	**(United Kingdom) James Calado (Italy) Alessandro Pier Guidi (Italy) Davide Rigon (Brazil) Daniel Serra**	**Ferrari 296 GT3**	**733**	**+58 Laps‡**
17	**GTD; Pro**	**62**	**(United States) Risi Competizione**	**(United Kingdom) James Calado (Italy) Alessandro Pier Guidi (Italy) Davide Rigon (Brazil) Daniel Serra**	**Ferrari F163CE 3.0 L Turbo V6**	**733**	**+58 Laps‡**
18	GTD; Pro	77	(United States) AO Racing	(Denmark) Michael Christensen (Germany) Laurin Heinrich (United Kingdom) Sebastian Priaulx	Porsche 911 GT3 R (992)	732	+59 Laps
18	GTD; Pro	77	(United States) AO Racing	(Denmark) Michael Christensen (Germany) Laurin Heinrich (United Kingdom) Sebastian Priaulx	Porsche M97/80 4.2 L Flat-6	732	+59 Laps
19	**GTD**	**57**	**(United States) Winward Racing**	**(Netherlands) Indy Dontje (Switzerland) Philip Ellis (Canada) Daniel Morad (United States) Russell Ward**	**Mercedes-AMG GT3 Evo**	**731**	**+60 Laps‡**
19	**GTD**	**57**	**(United States) Winward Racing**	**(Netherlands) Indy Dontje (Switzerland) Philip Ellis (Canada) Daniel Morad (United States) Russell Ward**	**Mercedes-AMG M159 6.2 L V8**	**731**	**+60 Laps‡**
20	GTD	21	(Italy) AF Corse	(Japan) Kei Cozzolino (France) François Heriau (United Kingdom) Simon Mann (Spain) Miguel Molina	Ferrari 296 GT3	731	+60 Laps
20	GTD	21	(Italy) AF Corse	(Japan) Kei Cozzolino (France) François Heriau (United Kingdom) Simon Mann (Spain) Miguel Molina	Ferrari F163CE 3.0 L Turbo V6	731	+60 Laps
21	GTD; Pro	1	(United States) Paul Miller Racing	(South Africa) Sheldon van der Linde (United States) Bryan Sellers (United States) Madison Snow (United States) Neil Verhagen	BMW M4 GT3	730	+61 Laps
21	GTD; Pro	1	(United States) Paul Miller Racing	(South Africa) Sheldon van der Linde (United States) Bryan Sellers (United States) Madison Snow (United States) Neil Verhagen	BMW S58B30T0 3.0 L Turbo I6	730	+61 Laps
22	GTD	34	(United States) Conquest Racing	(Italy) Alessandro Balzan (Spain) Albert Costa (United States) Manny Franco (Monaco) Cédric Sbirrazzuoli	Ferrari 296 GT3	730	+61 Laps
22	GTD	34	(United States) Conquest Racing	(Italy) Alessandro Balzan (Spain) Albert Costa (United States) Manny Franco (Monaco) Cédric Sbirrazzuoli	Ferrari F163CE 3.0 L Turbo V6	730	+61 Laps
23	GTD	023	(United States) Triarsi Competizione	(Italy) Riccardo Agostini (Italy) Alessio Rovera (United States) Charlie Scardina (United States) Onofrio Triarsi	Ferrari 296 GT3	730	+61 Laps
23	GTD	023	(United States) Triarsi Competizione	(Italy) Riccardo Agostini (Italy) Alessio Rovera (United States) Charlie Scardina (United States) Onofrio Triarsi	Ferrari F163CE 3.0 L Turbo V6	730	+61 Laps
24	GTD	32	(United States) Korthoff/Preston Motorsports	(Germany) Maximilian Götz (Canada) Mikaël Grenier (United States) Kenton Koch (United States) Mike Skeen	Mercedes-AMG GT3 Evo	730	+61 Laps
24	GTD	32	(United States) Korthoff/Preston Motorsports	(Germany) Maximilian Götz (Canada) Mikaël Grenier (United States) Kenton Koch (United States) Mike Skeen	Mercedes-AMG M159 6.2 L V8	730	+61 Laps
25	GTD	83	(Italy) Iron Dames	(Belgium) Sarah Bovy (Switzerland) Rahel Frey (Denmark) Michelle Gatting (France) Doriane Pin	Lamborghini Huracán GT3 Evo 2	730	+61 Laps
25	GTD	83	(Italy) Iron Dames	(Belgium) Sarah Bovy (Switzerland) Rahel Frey (Denmark) Michelle Gatting (France) Doriane Pin	Lamborghini DGF 5.2 L V10	730	+61 Laps
26	GTD	120	(United States) Wright Motorsports	(United States) Adam Adelson (Belgium) Jan Heylen (France) Frédéric Makowiecki (United States) Elliott Skeer	Porsche 911 GT3 R (992)	729	+62 Laps
26	GTD	120	(United States) Wright Motorsports	(United States) Adam Adelson (Belgium) Jan Heylen (France) Frédéric Makowiecki (United States) Elliott Skeer	Porsche M97/80 4.2 L Flat-6	729	+62 Laps
27	GTD	80	(United States) Lone Star Racing	(Angola) Rui Andrade (Australia) Scott Andrews (United Kingdom) Adam Christodoulou (Turkey) Salih Yoluç	Mercedes-AMG GT3 Evo	729	+62 Laps
27	GTD	80	(United States) Lone Star Racing	(Angola) Rui Andrade (Australia) Scott Andrews (United Kingdom) Adam Christodoulou (Turkey) Salih Yoluç	Mercedes-AMG M159 6.2 L V8	729	+62 Laps
28	GTD	43	(United States) Andretti Motorsports	(United States) Jarett Andretti (Colombia) Gabby Chaves (Canada) Scott Hargrove (Austria) Thomas Preining	Porsche 911 GT3 R (992)	728	+63 Laps
28	GTD	43	(United States) Andretti Motorsports	(United States) Jarett Andretti (Colombia) Gabby Chaves (Canada) Scott Hargrove (Austria) Thomas Preining	Porsche M97/80 4.2 L Flat-6	728	+63 Laps
29	GTD; Pro	23	(United States) Heart of Racing Team	(Germany) Mario Farnbacher (United Kingdom) Ross Gunn (Spain) Alex Riberas	Aston Martin Vantage AMR GT3 Evo	727	+64 Laps
29	GTD; Pro	23	(United States) Heart of Racing Team	(Germany) Mario Farnbacher (United Kingdom) Ross Gunn (Spain) Alex Riberas	Aston Martin M177 4.0 L Turbo V8	727	+64 Laps
30	GTD; Pro	3	(United States) Corvette Racing by Pratt Miller Motorsports	(Spain) Antonio García (Spain) Daniel Juncadella (United Kingdom) Alexander Sims	Chevrolet Corvette Z06 GT3.R	726	+65 Laps
30	GTD; Pro	3	(United States) Corvette Racing by Pratt Miller Motorsports	(Spain) Antonio García (Spain) Daniel Juncadella (United Kingdom) Alexander Sims	Chevrolet LT6 5.5 L V8	726	+65 Laps
31	GTD; Pro	64	(Canada) Ford Multimatic Motorsports	(Germany) Christopher Mies (Germany) Mike Rockenfeller (United Kingdom) Harry Tincknell	Ford Mustang GT3	726	+65 Laps
31	GTD; Pro	64	(Canada) Ford Multimatic Motorsports	(Germany) Christopher Mies (Germany) Mike Rockenfeller (United Kingdom) Harry Tincknell	Ford Coyote 5.4 L V8	726	+65 Laps
32	GTD	47	(Italy) Cetilar Racing	(Italy) Eddie Cheever III (Italy) Antonio Fuoco (Italy) Roberto Lacorte (Italy) Giorgio Sernagiotto	Ferrari 296 GT3	722	+69 Laps
32	GTD	47	(Italy) Cetilar Racing	(Italy) Eddie Cheever III (Italy) Antonio Fuoco (Italy) Roberto Lacorte (Italy) Giorgio Sernagiotto	Ferrari F163CE 3.0 L Turbo V6	722	+69 Laps
33	GTD; Pro	19	(Italy) Iron Lynx	(Italy) Mirko Bortolotti (Italy) Andrea Caldarelli (South Africa) Jordan Pepper (France) Franck Perera	Lamborghini Huracán GT3 Evo 2	721	+70 Laps
33	GTD; Pro	19	(Italy) Iron Lynx	(Italy) Mirko Bortolotti (Italy) Andrea Caldarelli (South Africa) Jordan Pepper (France) Franck Perera	Lamborghini DGF 5.2 L V10	721	+70 Laps
34	GTD	92	(United States) Kelly-Moss with Riley	(France) Julien Andlauer (United States) David Brule (United States) Trent Hindman (United States) Alec Udell	Porsche 911 GT3 R (992)	719	+72 Laps
34	GTD	92	(United States) Kelly-Moss with Riley	(France) Julien Andlauer (United States) David Brule (United States) Trent Hindman (United States) Alec Udell	Porsche M97/80 4.2 L Flat-6	719	+72 Laps
35	GTD	86	(United States) MDK Motorsports	(Austria) Klaus Bachler (Denmark) Anders Fjordbach (China) Kerong Li (Netherlands) Larry ten Voorde	Porsche 911 GT3 R (992)	718	+73 Laps
35	GTD	86	(United States) MDK Motorsports	(Austria) Klaus Bachler (Denmark) Anders Fjordbach (China) Kerong Li (Netherlands) Larry ten Voorde	Porsche M97/80 4.2 L Flat-6	718	+73 Laps
36	GTD	70	(United Kingdom) Inception Racing	(United Kingdom) Tom Gamble (United States) Brendan Iribe (United Kingdom) Ollie Millroy (Denmark) Frederik Schandorff	McLaren 720S GT3 Evo	716	+75 Laps
36	GTD	70	(United Kingdom) Inception Racing	(United Kingdom) Tom Gamble (United States) Brendan Iribe (United Kingdom) Ollie Millroy (Denmark) Frederik Schandorff	McLaren M840T 4.0 L Turbo V8	716	+75 Laps
37	GTD; Pro	4	(United States) Corvette Racing by Pratt Miller Motorsports	(New Zealand) Earl Bamber (Netherlands) Nicky Catsburg (United States) Tommy Milner	Chevrolet Corvette Z06 GT3.R	715	+76 Laps
37	GTD; Pro	4	(United States) Corvette Racing by Pratt Miller Motorsports	(New Zealand) Earl Bamber (Netherlands) Nicky Catsburg (United States) Tommy Milner	Chevrolet LT6 5.5 L V8	715	+76 Laps
38	GTD	96	(United States) Turner Motorsport	(United States) Robby Foley (United States) Patrick Gallagher (Germany) Jens Klingmann (United States) Jake Walker	BMW M4 GT3	711	+80 Laps
38	GTD	96	(United States) Turner Motorsport	(United States) Robby Foley (United States) Patrick Gallagher (Germany) Jens Klingmann (United States) Jake Walker	BMW S58B30T0 3.0 L Turbo I6	711	+80 Laps
39 DNF	GTD	12	(United States) Vasser Sullivan	(Japan) Ritomo Miyata (United States) Frankie Montecalvo (United States) Aaron Telitz (Canada) Parker Thompson	Lexus RC F GT3	705	Fire
39 DNF	GTD	12	(United States) Vasser Sullivan	(Japan) Ritomo Miyata (United States) Frankie Montecalvo (United States) Aaron Telitz (Canada) Parker Thompson	Toyota 2UR-GSE 5.4 L V8	705	Fire
40	GTD	78	(United States) Forte Racing	(Canada) Devlin DeFrancesco (Canada) Misha Goikhberg (United Kingdom) Sandy Mitchell (Italy) Loris Spinelli	Lamborghini Huracán GT3 Evo 2	676	+115 Laps
40	GTD	78	(United States) Forte Racing	(Canada) Devlin DeFrancesco (Canada) Misha Goikhberg (United Kingdom) Sandy Mitchell (Italy) Loris Spinelli	Lamborghini DGF 5.2 L V10	676	+115 Laps
41 DNF	GTD; Pro	65	(Canada) Ford Multimatic Motorsports	(United States) Joey Hand (Germany) Dirk Müller (Belgium) Frédéric Vervisch	Ford Mustang GT3	650	Wing damage
41 DNF	GTD; Pro	65	(Canada) Ford Multimatic Motorsports	(United States) Joey Hand (Germany) Dirk Müller (Belgium) Frédéric Vervisch	Ford Coyote 5.4 L V8	650	Wing damage
42	GTD	45	(United States) Wayne Taylor Racing with Andretti	(United States) Graham Doyle (Costa Rica) Danny Formal (United States) Ashton Harrison (Canada) Kyle Marcelli	Lamborghini Huracán GT3 Evo 2	643	+148 Laps
42	GTD	45	(United States) Wayne Taylor Racing with Andretti	(United States) Graham Doyle (Costa Rica) Danny Formal (United States) Ashton Harrison (Canada) Kyle Marcelli	Lamborghini DGF 5.2 L V10	643	+148 Laps
43 DNF	GTP	10	(United States) Wayne Taylor Racing with Andretti	(Portugal) Filipe Albuquerque (Sweden) Marcus Ericsson (New Zealand) Brendon Hartley (United States) Ricky Taylor	Acura ARX-06	601	Electrical
43 DNF	GTP	10	(United States) Wayne Taylor Racing with Andretti	(Portugal) Filipe Albuquerque (Sweden) Marcus Ericsson (New Zealand) Brendon Hartley (United States) Ricky Taylor	Acura AR24e 2.4 L Twin-Turbo V6	601	Electrical
44 DNF	GTD; Pro	9	(Canada) Pfaff Motorsports	(Canada) James Hinchcliffe (United Kingdom) Oliver Jarvis (Germany) Marvin Kirchhöfer (United States) Alexander Rossi	McLaren 720S GT3 Evo	532	Mechanical
44 DNF	GTD; Pro	9	(Canada) Pfaff Motorsports	(Canada) James Hinchcliffe (United Kingdom) Oliver Jarvis (Germany) Marvin Kirchhöfer (United States) Alexander Rossi	McLaren M840T 4.0 L Turbo V8	532	Mechanical
45 DNF	LMP2	33	(United States) Sean Creech Motorsports	(Portugal) João Barbosa (United Kingdom) Jonny Edgar (United States) Nolan Siegel (United States) Lance Willsey	Ligier JS P217	510	Engine cover damage
45 DNF	LMP2	33	(United States) Sean Creech Motorsports	(Portugal) João Barbosa (United Kingdom) Jonny Edgar (United States) Nolan Siegel (United States) Lance Willsey	Gibson GK428 4.2 L V8	510	Engine cover damage
46 DNF	GTD	17	(Canada) AWA	(Republic of Ireland) Charlie Eastwood (Canada) Anthony Mantella (United States) Thomas Merrill (Argentina) Nicolás Varrone	Chevrolet Corvette Z06 GT3.R	508	Electrical
46 DNF	GTD	17	(Canada) AWA	(Republic of Ireland) Charlie Eastwood (Canada) Anthony Mantella (United States) Thomas Merrill (Argentina) Nicolás Varrone	Chevrolet LT6 5.5 L V8	508	Electrical
47 DNF	GTP	01	(United States) Cadillac Racing	(France) Sébastien Bourdais (New Zealand) Scott Dixon (Spain) Álex Palou (Netherlands) Renger van der Zande	Cadillac V-Series.R	423	Powertrain
47 DNF	GTP	01	(United States) Cadillac Racing	(France) Sébastien Bourdais (New Zealand) Scott Dixon (Spain) Álex Palou (Netherlands) Renger van der Zande	Cadillac LMC55R 5.5 L V8	423	Powertrain
48 DNF	GTD; Pro	14	(United States) Vasser Sullivan	(United Kingdom) Ben Barnicoat (United Kingdom) Mike Conway (United Kingdom) Jack Hawksworth (United States) Kyle Kirkwood	Lexus RC F GT3	397	Overheating
48 DNF	GTD; Pro	14	(United States) Vasser Sullivan	(United Kingdom) Ben Barnicoat (United Kingdom) Mike Conway (United Kingdom) Jack Hawksworth (United States) Kyle Kirkwood	Toyota 2UR-GSE 5.4 L V8	397	Overheating
49 DNF	GTD	66	(United States) Gradient Racing	(Colombia) Tatiana Calderón (United Kingdom) Katherine Legge (United Kingdom) Stevan McAleer (United States) Sheena Monk	Acura NSX GT3 Evo22	368	Electrical
49 DNF	GTD	66	(United States) Gradient Racing	(Colombia) Tatiana Calderón (United Kingdom) Katherine Legge (United Kingdom) Stevan McAleer (United States) Sheena Monk	Acura JNC1 3.5 L Turbo V6	368	Electrical
50 DNF	GTD	55	(Germany) Proton Competition	(United States) Ryan Hardwick (Italy) Giammarco Levorato (United States) Corey Lewis (Norway) Dennis Olsen	Ford Mustang GT3	367	Contact damage
50 DNF	GTD	55	(Germany) Proton Competition	(United States) Ryan Hardwick (Italy) Giammarco Levorato (United States) Corey Lewis (Norway) Dennis Olsen	Ford Coyote 5.4 L V8	367	Contact damage
51 DNF	GTD	13	(Canada) AWA	(United Kingdom) Matt Bell (Canada) Orey Fidani (Germany) Lars Kern (United Kingdom) Alex Lynn	Chevrolet Corvette Z06 GT3.R	308	Power Steering
51 DNF	GTD	13	(Canada) AWA	(United Kingdom) Matt Bell (Canada) Orey Fidani (Germany) Lars Kern (United Kingdom) Alex Lynn	Chevrolet LT6 5.5 L V8	308	Power Steering
52 DNF	GTD	27	(United States) Heart of Racing Team	(Canada) Roman De Angelis (United Kingdom) Ian James (Canada) Zacharie Robichon (Denmark) Marco Sørensen	Aston Martin Vantage AMR GT3 Evo	303	Electrical
52 DNF	GTD	27	(United States) Heart of Racing Team	(Canada) Roman De Angelis (United Kingdom) Ian James (Canada) Zacharie Robichon (Denmark) Marco Sørensen	Aston Martin M177 4.0 L Turbo V8	303	Electrical
53 DNF	GTD	44	(United States) Magnus Racing	(United States) Andy Lally (United States) John Potter (United States) Spencer Pumpelly (Denmark) Nicki Thiim	Aston Martin Vantage AMR GT3 Evo	294	Contact damage
53 DNF	GTD	44	(United States) Magnus Racing	(United States) Andy Lally (United States) John Potter (United States) Spencer Pumpelly (Denmark) Nicki Thiim	Aston Martin M177 4.0 L Turbo V8	294	Contact damage
54 DNF	GTD; Pro	60	(Italy) Iron Lynx	(Italy) Matteo Cairoli (Italy) Matteo Cressoni (France) Romain Grosjean (Italy) Claudio Schiavoni	Lamborghini Huracán GT3 Evo 2	293	Gearbox
54 DNF	GTD; Pro	60	(Italy) Iron Lynx	(Italy) Matteo Cairoli (Italy) Matteo Cressoni (France) Romain Grosjean (Italy) Claudio Schiavoni	Lamborghini DGF 5.2 L V10	293	Gearbox
55 DNF	GTD; Pro	75	(Australia) SunEnergy1 Racing	(Germany) Maro Engel (Andorra) Jules Gounon (Australia) Kenny Habul (Germany) Luca Stolz	Mercedes-AMG GT3 Evo	193	Mechanical
55 DNF	GTD; Pro	75	(Australia) SunEnergy1 Racing	(Germany) Maro Engel (Andorra) Jules Gounon (Australia) Kenny Habul (Germany) Luca Stolz	Mercedes-AMG M159 6.2 L V8	193	Mechanical
56 DNF	LMP2	20	(Denmark) MDK by High Class Racing	(Denmark) Dennis Andersen (Germany) Laurents Hörr (United States) Scott Huffaker (United States) Seth Lucas	Oreca 07	185	Accident damage
56 DNF	LMP2	20	(Denmark) MDK by High Class Racing	(Denmark) Dennis Andersen (Germany) Laurents Hörr (United States) Scott Huffaker (United States) Seth Lucas	Gibson GK428 4.2 L V8	185	Accident damage
57 DNF	LMP2	22	(United States) United Autosports USA	(United Kingdom) Paul di Resta (United States) Bijoy Garg (United States) Dan Goldburg (Sweden) Felix Rosenqvist	Oreca 07	128	Accident damage
57 DNF	LMP2	22	(United States) United Autosports USA	(United Kingdom) Paul di Resta (United States) Bijoy Garg (United States) Dan Goldburg (Sweden) Felix Rosenqvist	Gibson GK428 4.2 L V8	128	Accident damage
58 DNF	LMP2	88	(Italy) Richard Mille AF Corse	(Denmark) Nicklas Nielsen (Argentina) Luis Pérez Companc (France) Matthieu Vaxivière (France) Lilou Wadoux	Oreca 07	107	Mechanical
58 DNF	LMP2	88	(Italy) Richard Mille AF Corse	(Denmark) Nicklas Nielsen (Argentina) Luis Pérez Companc (France) Matthieu Vaxivière (France) Lilou Wadoux	Gibson GK428 4.2 L V8	107	Mechanical
59 DNF	LMP2	11	(France) TDS Racing	(Denmark) Mikkel Jensen (New Zealand) Hunter McElrea (France) Charles Milesi (United States) Steven Thomas	Oreca 07	58	Accident
59 DNF	LMP2	11	(France) TDS Racing	(Denmark) Mikkel Jensen (New Zealand) Hunter McElrea (France) Charles Milesi (United States) Steven Thomas	Gibson GK428 4.2 L V8	58	Accident

== Standings after the race ==
GTP Drivers' Championship standings
Pos.	Driver	Points
1	(United States) Dane Cameron (Australia) Matt Campbell (Brazil) Felipe Nasr (United States) Josef Newgarden	380
2	(United Kingdom) Jack Aitken (United Kingdom) Tom Blomqvist (Brazil) Pipo Derani	355
3	(United Kingdom) Jenson Button (Switzerland) Louis Delétraz (United States) Colton Herta (United States) Jordan Taylor	326
4	(France) Kévin Estre (France) Mathieu Jaminet (United Kingdom) Nick Tandy (Belgium) Laurens Vanthoor	304
5	(United Kingdom) Phil Hanson (Netherlands) Tijmen van der Helm (United States) Ben Keating (United Kingdom) Richard Westbrook	272

LMP2 Drivers' Championship standings
Pos.	Driver	Points
1	(United Kingdom) Ryan Dalziel (United States) Dwight Merriman (Denmark) Christian Rasmussen (United States) Connor Zilisch	370
2	(United States) Colin Braun (Denmark) Malthe Jakobsen (United States) George Kurtz (United Kingdom) Toby Sowery	350
3	(Australia) Josh Burdon (Brazil) Felipe Fraga (Brazil) Felipe Massa (United States) Gar Robinson	328
4	(United States) Nick Boulle (France) Tom Dillmann (Brazil) Pietro Fittipaldi (Poland) Jakub Śmiechowski	312
5	(United Kingdom) Ben Hanley (United States) Ben Keating (Mexico) Pato O'Ward (Chile) Nico Pino	285

GTD Pro Drivers' Championship standings
Pos.	Driver	Points
1	(United Kingdom) James Calado (Italy) Alessandro Pier Guidi (Italy) Davide Rigon (Brazil) Daniel Serra	376
2	(Denmark) Michael Christensen (Germany) Laurin Heinrich (United Kingdom) Sebastian Priaulx	355
3	(South Africa) Sheldon van der Linde (United States) Bryan Sellers (United States) Madison Snow (United States) Neil Verhagen	319
4	(Germany) Mario Farnbacher (United Kingdom) Ross Gunn (Spain) Alex Riberas	300
5	(Spain) Antonio García (Spain) Daniel Juncadella (United Kingdom) Alexander Sims	290

GTD Drivers' Championship standings
Pos.	Driver	Points
1	(Netherlands) Indy Dontje (Switzerland) Philip Ellis (Canada) Daniel Morad (United States) Russell Ward	364
2	(Japan) Kei Cozzolino (France) François Heriau (United Kingdom) Simon Mann (Spain) Miguel Molina	340
3	(Italy) Alessandro Balzan (Spain) Albert Costa (United States) Manny Franco (Monaco) Cédric Sbirrazzuoli	325
4	(Italy) Riccardo Agostini (Italy) Alessio Rovera (United States) Charlie Scardina (United States) Onofrio Triarsi	303
5	(Germany) Maximilian Götz (Canada) Mikaël Grenier (United States) Kenton Koch (United States) Mike Skeen	273

- Note: Only the top five positions are included for all sets of standings.

GTP Teams' Championship standings
Pos.	Team	Points
1	(Germany) #7 Porsche Penske Motorsport	380
2	(United States) #31 Whelen Cadillac Racing	355
3	(United States) #40 Wayne Taylor Racing with Andretti	326
4	(Germany) #6 Porsche Penske Motorsport	304
5	(United States) #85 JDC–Miller MotorSports	272

LMP2 Teams' Championship standings
Pos.	Team	Points
1	(United States) #18 Era Motorsport	370
2	(United States) #04 CrowdStrike Racing by APR	350
3	(United States) #74 Riley	328
4	(Poland) #52 Inter Europol by PR1/Mathiasen Motorsports	312
5	(United States) #2 United Autosports USA	285

GTD Pro Teams' Championship standings
Pos.	Team	Points
1	(United States) #62 Risi Competizione	376
2	(United States) #77 AO Racing	355
3	(United States) #1 Paul Miller Racing	319
4	(United States) #23 Heart of Racing Team	300
5	(United States) #3 Corvette Racing by Pratt Miller Motorsports	290

GTD Teams' Championship standings
Pos.	Team	Points
1	(United States) #57 Winward Racing	364
2	(Italy) #21 AF Corse	340
3	(United States) #34 Conquest Racing	325
4	(United States) #023 Triarsi Competizione	303
5	(United States) #32 Korthoff/Preston Motorsports	273

- Note: Only the top five positions are included for all sets of standings.

GTP Manufacturers' Championship standings
Pos.	Manufacturer	Points
1	(Germany) Porsche	382
2	(United States) Cadillac	355
3	(Japan) Acura	328
4	(Germany) BMW	310

GTD Pro Manufacturers' Championship standings
Pos.	Manufacturer	Points
1	(Germany) Porsche	355
2	(United Kingdom) Aston Martin	302
3	(United States) Chevrolet	290
4	(United States) Ford	274
5	(Italy) Lamborghini	268

GTD Manufacturers' Championship standings
Pos.	Manufacturer	Points
1	(Germany) Mercedes-AMG	371
2	(Italy) Lamborghini	328
3	(Germany) Porsche	312
4	(United Kingdom) McLaren	284
5	(Japan) Lexus	275

- Note: Only the top five positions are included for all sets of standings.

IMSA SportsCar Championship
Previous race: none	2024 season	Next race: 12 Hours of Sebring
