= Frederik Schandorff =

Danish racing driver (born 1996)

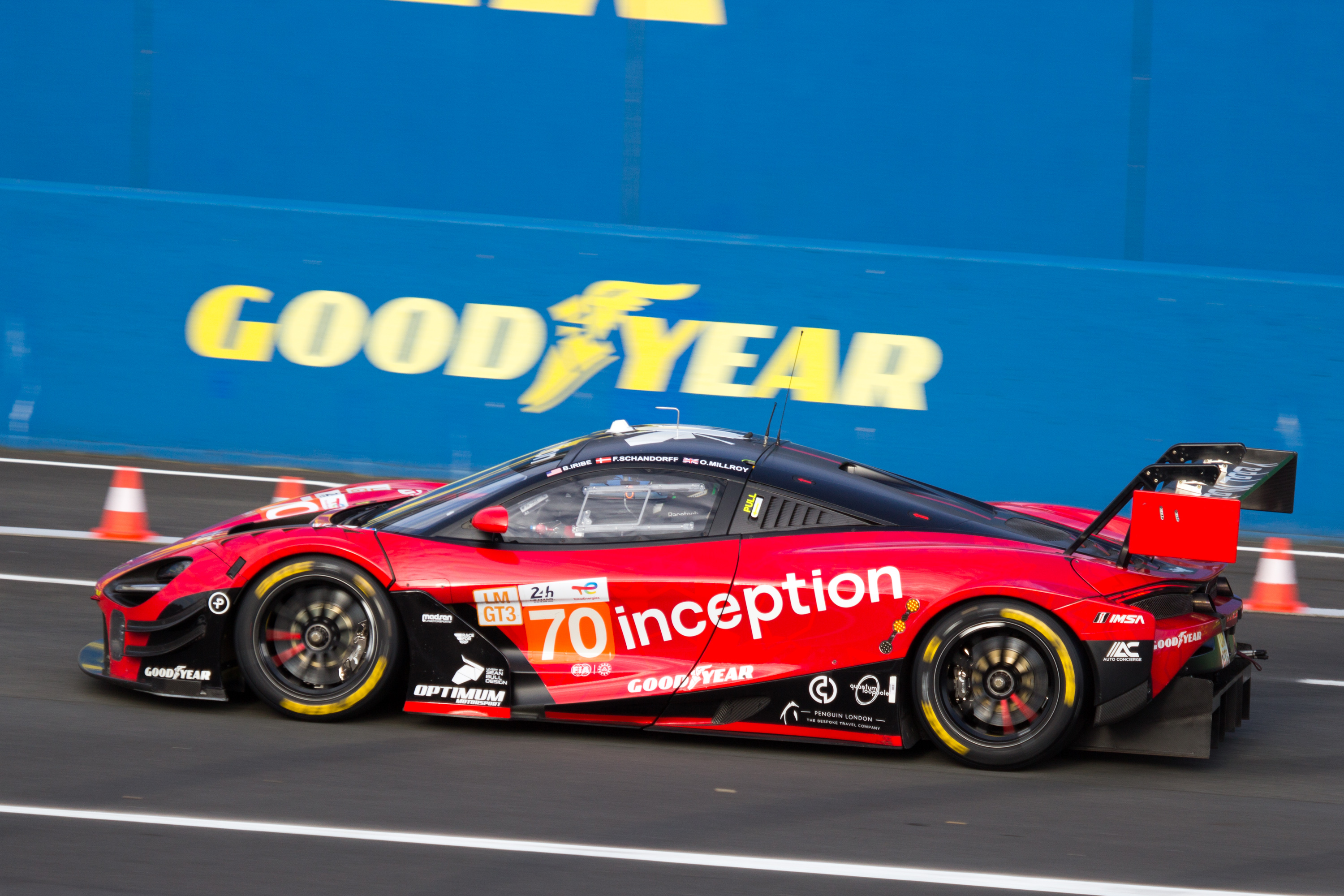
- Schandorff at the 2024 24 Hours of Le Mans
- Nationality: (Denmark) Danish
- Born: Frederik Faarborg Schandorff; 26 December 1996 (age 29) Djursland, Denmark
- Categorisation: FIA Silver (until 2022); FIA Gold (2023–)

Championship titles
- 2022 2021 2020 2019 2019 2014: GTWCE Endurance Cup – Bronze; International GT Open; GTWCE Endurance Cup – Silver; International GT Open – Pro-Am; Lamborghini Super Trofeo Middle East – Pro; Formula Ford Denmark

Frederik Faarborg Schandorff (born 26 December 1996 in Djursland) is a Danish racing driver who competes in the IMSA SportsCar Championship with Inception Racing. He is a two-time GT World Challenge Europe Endurance Cup class champion, having also won the Lamborghini Super Trofeo World Final in 2019 and International GT Open in 2021.

== Career ==
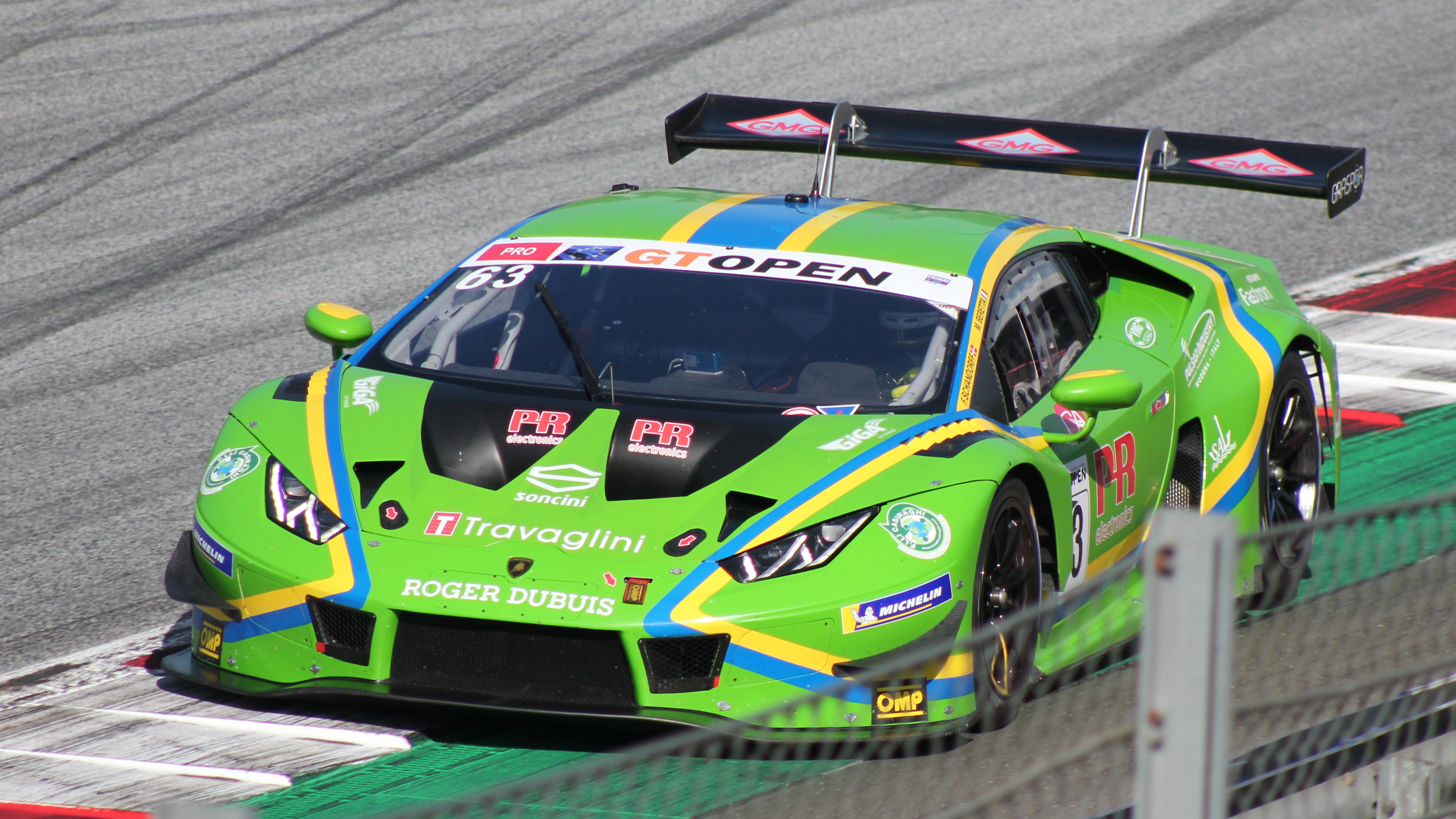
Schandorff's GT Open title-winning Lamborghini in 2021

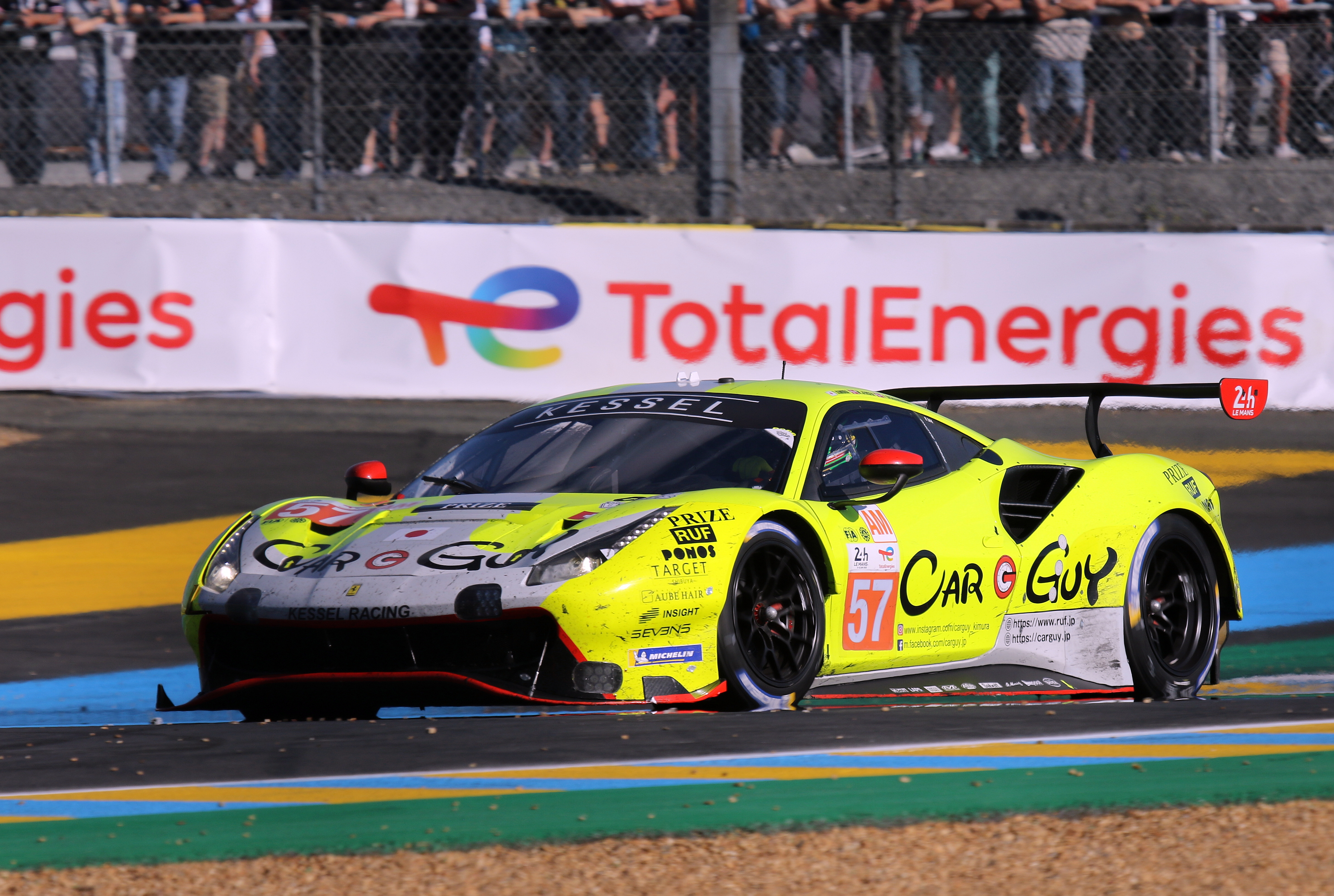
Schandorff's Car Guy-liveried Ferrari at the 2022 24 Hours of Le Mans

Schandorff began racing single-seaters in 2013, competing in Formula Ford Denmark. After winning the Formula Ford Denmark title the following year, Schandorff switched to the Danish Thundersport Championship in 2015, scoring two podiums en route to a tenth-place points finish. Two more seasons in the series then ensued, finishing fifth in points in both seasons, in which he scored his maiden series win at Jyllands-Ringen in 2016 as he became the series' youngest race winner. Continuing in the Danish Thundersport Championship for 2018, Schandorff switched to LM Racing for his fourth season in the series, scoring seven podiums to end the year third in points.

Stepping up to GT3 competition for 2019, Schandorff joined Vincenzo Sospiri Racing for a dual campaign in the Blancpain GT World Challenge Asia and the International GT Open. In the former, Schandorff scored his only class win of the season at Buriram and stood on the podium in all but four races as he ended the year third in the GT3 Pro-Am standings. In the latter, Schandorff took four wins and four further podiums to secure the Pro-Am title at the finale in Monza. During 2019, Schandorff also won the Lamborghini Super Trofeo Middle East Pro title for Target Racing, as well as the Lamborghini Super Trofeo World Final Pro title for the same team.

The following year, Schandorff joined Barwell Motorsport for his rookie season in the GT World Challenge Europe Endurance Cup, as well as racing in the Italian GT Endurance Championship for Vincenzo Sospiri Racing. In the former, Schandorff scored class wins at Imola and Le Castellet, as well as finishing second at the Nürburgring to clinch the Silver Cup title at season's end. In the latter, Schandorff finished second at Vallelunga and third at Monza en route to a sixth-place points finish. Remaining with Vincenzo Sospiri Racing for 2021, Schandorff returned to International GT Open, racing in the Pro class alongside Michele Beretta. Starting off the season with a win at Le Castellet and Spa, before taking further wins at the Hungaroring and Red Bull Ring, and six more podiums to secure the Pro title at the end of the year. During 2021, Schandorff also made his debut in the GTD class of the IMSA SportsCar Championship, racing at the Petit Le Mans for Inception Racing with Optimum Motorsport.

In 2022, Schandorff joined Kessel Racing to race in the LMGTE class of the European Le Mans Series, as well as the GT World Challenge Europe Endurance Cup for Inception Racing with Optimum Motorsport. In the former, Schandorff scored his only win of the season at Spa and took two more podiums to end the year runner-up in the LMGTE standings. In GTWC, Schandorff scored class wins at Le Castellet and the Hockenheimring to secure the Gold Cup title at the season finale in Barcelona. During 2022, Schandorff also raced at the 24 Hours of Le Mans for Kessel Racing in LMGTE Am, as well as making select starts in the IMSA SportsCar Championship's GTD class for Inception Racing. After starting off the 2023 season by racing in Asian Le Mans Series for CarGuy Racing, Schandorff returned to Inception Racing for his first full-time season in the GTD class of the IMSA SportsCar Championship. Racing alongside Brendan Iribe, the pair finished third at the 24 Hours of Daytona, before scoring second-place finishes at Mosport and Road America en route to a sixth-place finish in the GTD standings.

The following year, Schandorff continued in the IMSA SportsCar Championship with Inception Racing, scoring podiums at Mosport and Road America, before the team switched to a Ferrari 296 for the final two rounds, as he ended the year ninth in points. During 2024, Schandorff also raced at the 24 Hours of Le Mans for the same team, as well as winning the Gulf 12 Hours on track for Optimum Motorsport, but was relegated to second after being given two 30-second penalties for speeding in the pit lane. Remaining with Inception Racing for 2025, Schandorff scored a lone win at Indianapolis and a second-place finish at Watkins Glen to end the year 10th in GTD. During 2025, Schandorff also raced in select rounds of Lamborghini Super Trofeo Europe for Auto Sport Racing Service, as well as the 24 Hours of Spa for Garage 59.

Schandorff remained with Inception Racing for his fourth full-time season in the GTD class of the IMSA SportsCar Championship the following year, as well as joining AF Corse-run Selected Car Racing to race in GT World Challenge Europe Endurance Cup. In the former, Schandorff took a best result of third at both Laguna Seca and VIR to take ninth in points. In GTWC, Schandorff took Gold Cup wins at Monza and Algarve to secure runner-up honours in class. In parallel, Schandorff also competed with AF Corse USA in GT World Challenge America with Matías Pérez Companc, taking an overall win at Barber, a class win at Road Atlanta and three other podiums to end the season fourth in points despite missing a round. At the end of the year, Schandorff joined AMG-fielding Petrolife Racing Team to race in the GT3 class of the 2026–27 Asian Le Mans Series.

Schandorff then continued with Inception and the Iribe-Millroy pairing to remain in the IMSA SportsCar Championship for 2027, as the team switched to a Chevrolet Corvette Z06 GT3.R.

== Karting record ==
=== Karting career summary ===
Season	Series	Team	Position
2005	Racehall of Champions - 55 kg		5th
2011	CIK-FIA Karting Academy Trophy		14th
2011	Rotax Max Challenge Denmark - Junior		4th
2011	Rotax Max Challenge Denmark - Senior		21st
2011	Karting World Championship – Academy	Schandorff Peter	14th
2012	German Kart Championship - KF1		26th
2012	IAME International Final - X30 Senior		9th
2012	Danish Super Kart DASU/DINO Talent Cup	Djursland Motor Klub Autosport	
2012	Karting World Championship – U18	DANISH NATIONAL U18 TEAM	13th

== Racing record ==
=== Racing career summary ===
Season	Series	Team	Races	Wins	Poles	F/Laps	Podiums	Points	Position
2013	Formula Ford Denmark		23	3	0	2	16	321	**3rd**
2013	Formula Ford International North Sea Series		4	2	0	1	4	?	?
2013	Formula Ford NEZ North European Championship	CF-Racing	3	0	0	1	2	38	4th
2014	Volkswagen Scirocco R-Cup	—N/a	5	0	0	0	0	35	21st
2014	Formula Ford Denmark	CF Racing	19	12	2	8	19	408	**1st**
2015	Danish Thundersport Championship	CF Racing	18	0	0	0	2	169	10th
2015	Formula Ford Denmark	CF Racing	5	3	0	3	3	75	9th
2016	Danish Thundersport Championship	AD Racing / Flexlease.nu	21	1	0	1	6	252	5th
2017	24H Series - TCR	Insightracing Denmark	1	0	0	0	0	0	NC
2017	Danish Thundersport Championship	LM Racing	21	0	0	1	6	257	5th
2018	Lamborghini Super Trofeo Europe – Pro	Leipert Motorsport	12	1	0	0	4	55	7th
2018	Lamborghini Super Trofeo Asia – Pro	Leipert Motorsport	2	1	0	1	1	23	7th
2018	Lamborghini Super Trofeo World Final – Pro	Leipert Motorsport	2	0	0	0	1	14	**3rd**
2018	Danish Thundersport Championship	LM Racing	21	0	0	1	7	245	**3rd**
2019	24H GT Series - SPX	Leipert Motorsport	1	1	0	0	1	85‡	**1st‡**
2019	Lamborghini Super Trofeo Europe – Pro	Target Racing	2	1	1	0	1	17	11th
2019	Lamborghini Super Trofeo Middle East – Pro	Target Racing	6	6	2	3	6	?	**1st**
2019	Lamborghini Super Trofeo World Final – Pro	Target Racing	2	1	1	0	2	28	**1st**
2019	Blancpain GT World Challenge Asia – GT3 Pro-Am	Vincenzo Sospiri Racing	12	1	0	1	8	149	**3rd**
2019	International GT Open	Vincenzo Sospiri Racing	14	0	0	0	0	28	12th
2019	International GT Open - Pro-Am	Vincenzo Sospiri Racing	14	4	0	0	8	78	**1st**
2019	Danish Thundersport Championship	Schandorff Racing	2	1	1	0	2	271	8th
2020	GT World Challenge Europe Endurance Cup	Barwell Motorsport	4	0	0	0	0	0	NC
2020	GT World Challenge Europe Endurance Cup - Silver	Barwell Motorsport	4	2	1	0	3	108	**1st**
2020	Intercontinental GT Challenge	Barwell Motorsport	1	0	0	0	0	0	NC
2020	Italian GT Championship Endurance Championship – GT3	Vincenzo Sospiri Racing	4	0	0	0	0	33	6th
2021	International GT Open	Vincenzo Sospiri Racing	14	4	1	2	11	146	**1st**
2021	IMSA SportsCar Championship - GTD	Inception Racing with Optimum Motorsport	1	0	0	0	0	209	63rd
2021	Nürburgring Langstrecken-Serie - VT2	Team AVIA Sorg Rennsport	1	0	0	0	0	0	NC
2022	European Le Mans Series - LMGTE	Car Guy Racing by Kessel Racing	6	1	1	2	3	78	**2nd**
2022	24 Hours of Le Mans - LMGTE Am	Kessel Racing	1	0	0	0	0	—N/a	12th
2022	GT World Challenge Europe Endurance Cup	Inception Racing with Optimum Motorsport	5	0	0	0	0	2	34th
2022	GT World Challenge Europe Endurance Cup – Gold	Inception Racing with Optimum Motorsport	5	2	1	1	2	90	**1st**
2022	IMSA SportsCar Championship – GTD	Inception Racing with Optimum Motorsport	3	0	0	3	0	483	41st
2022	24 Hours of Nürburgring - SP9	Dinamic Motorsport	1	0	0	0	0	—N/a	DNF
2022	Nürburgring Langstrecken-Serie - VT2 R+4	Team Sorg Rennsport	1	0	0	0	0	0	NC
2023	Asian Le Mans Series - GT	Car Guy Racing	4	0	0	0	0	1	19th
2023	European Le Mans Series - LMGTE	Kessel Racing	2	0	0	0	0	18	16th
2023	IMSA SportsCar Championship - GTD	Inception Racing	11	0	0	2	3	2853	6th
2023	GT World Challenge Europe Endurance Cup	Inception Racing	1	0	0	0	0	0	NC
2023	GT World Challenge Europe Endurance Cup - Bronze	Inception Racing	1	0	0	0	0	0	NC
2023	Lamborghini Super Trofeo Europe – Pro-Am	Target Racing							
2023	Lamborghini Super Trofeo World Final – Pro-Am	Target Racing	2	2	1	0	2	31	**1st**
2024	IMSA SportsCar Championship - GTD	Inception Racing	10	0	0	0	2	2308	9th
2024	24 Hours of Le Mans - LMGT3	Inception Racing	1	0	0	0	0	—N/a	13th
2024	24H Series - GT3	Optimum Motorsport	1	0	0	0	0	38	21st
2024	Gulf 12 Hours	Optimum Motorsport	1	0	0	0	1	—N/a	**2nd**
2024	Lamborghini Super Trofeo Europe – Pro-Am	Target Racing	4	2	1	1	4	54	9th
2024	Lamborghini Super Trofeo World Final – Pro-Am	Target Racing	2	0	1	0	1	10	4th
2025	IMSA SportsCar Championship - GTD	Inception Racing	10	1	0	1	2	2405	10th
2025	Gulf 12 Hours	Inception Racing	1	0	1	0	0	—N/a	DNF
2025	GT World Challenge Europe Endurance Cup	Garage 59	1	0	0	0	0	0	NC
2025	GT World Challenge Europe Endurance Cup – Gold	Garage 59	1	0	0	0	1	29	11th
2025	Lamborghini Super Trofeo Europe - Pro-Am	Auto Sport Racing Service	4	2	1	3	4	53	7th
2025	Lamborghini Super Trofeo World Final – Pro-Am	Auto Sport Racing Service	2	1	1	0	2	22	**2nd**
2026	IMSA SportsCar Championship – GTD	Inception Racing	9	0	0	0	2	2268	9th
2026	GT Winter Series – Cup 4	DC Motorsport	3	1	0	0	3	34	5th
2026	GT World Challenge America – Pro	AF Corse USA	6	2	2	4	5	131	4th
2026	GT World Challenge Europe Endurance Cup	Selected Car Racing	5	0	0	0	0	12	21st
2026	GT World Challenge Europe Endurance Cup – Gold	Selected Car Racing	5	2	1	0	3	104	**2nd**
2026	Intercontinental GT Challenge	Selected Car Racing	1	0	0	0	0	15	22nd
2026	Intercontinental GT Challenge	AF Corse USA	1	0	0	0	1	15	22nd
2026–27	Asian Le Mans Series – GT3	Petrolife Racing Team							
2027	IMSA SportsCar Championship – GTD	Inception Racing							

‡ Team standings.

=== Complete Blancpain GT World Challenge Asia results ===
(key) (Races in bold indicate pole position) (Races in italics indicate fastest lap)

Year	Entrant	Chassis	Class	1	2	3	4	5	6	7	8	9	10	11	12	Pos	Points
2019	Vincenzo Sospiri Racing	Lamborghini Huracán GT3 Evo	Pro-Am	SEP; 1; 8	SEP; 2; 2	CHA; 1; 1	CHA; 2; 2	SUZ; 1; 2	SUZ; 2; 11	FUJ; 1; 3	FUJ; 2; 3	KOR; 1; 3	KOR; 2 Ret	SHA; 1; 6	SHA; 2; 3	3rd	149

=== Complete International GT Open results ===
(key) (Races in bold indicate pole position; results in italics indicate fastest lap)

Year	Entrant	Chassis	Class	1	2	3	4	5	6	7	8	9	10	11	12	13	14	Rank	Points
2019	Vincenzo Sospiri Racing	Lamborghini Huracán GT3 Evo	Pro-Am	LEC; 1; 5	LEC; 2; 6	HOC; 1; 5	HOC; 2; 2	SPA; 1; 3	SPA; 2; 4	RBR; 1; 1	RBR; 2; 5	SIL; 1; 3	SIL; 2; 1	CAT; 1; 1	CAT; 2; 9	MNZ; 1; 1	MNZ; 2; 3	1st	78
2021	Vincenzo Sospiri Racing	Lamborghini Huracán GT3 Evo	Pro	LEC; 1; 5	LEC; 2; 1	SPA; 1; 5	SPA; 2; 1	HUN; 1; 1	HUN; 2; 3	IMO; 1; 2	**IMO**; **2**; 2	RBR; 1; 1	RBR; 2; 4	MNZ; 1; 2	MNZ; 2; 3	CAT; 1; 6	CAT; 2; 3	1st	146

=== Complete GT World Challenge Europe Endurance Cup results ===
Year	Team	Car	Class	1	2	3	4	5	6	7	Pos.	Points
2020	Barwell Motorsport	Lamborghini Huracán GT3 Evo	Silver	IMO; 12	**NÜR**; 13	SPA; 6H; 18	SPA; 12H; 23	SPA; 24H; 36	LEC; 14		1st	108
2022	Inception Racing with Optimum Motorsport	McLaren 720S GT3	Gold	IMO; 38	**LEC**; 9	SPA; 6H; 38	SPA; 12H; 38	SPA; 24H; 27	HOC; 15	CAT; 35	1st	90
2023	Inception Racing	McLaren 720S GT3 Evo	Bronze	MNZ	LEC	SPA; 6H; Ret	SPA; 12H; Ret	SPA; 24H; Ret	NÜR	CAT	NC	0
2025	Garage 59	McLaren 720S GT3 Evo	Gold	LEC	MNZ	SPA; 6H; 28	SPA; 12H; 15	SPA; 24H; 12	NÜR	CAT	11th	29
2026	Selected Car Racing	Ferrari 296 GT3 Evo	Gold	LEC; 16	MNZ; 14	SPA; 6H; 16	SPA; 12H; 42	SPA; 24H; 26	NÜR; 11	**ALG**; 4	2nd	104

=== Complete WeatherTech SportsCar Championship results ===
(key) (Races in bold indicate pole position; results in italics indicate fastest lap)

Year	Team	Class	Make	Engine	1	2	3	4	5	6	7	8	9	10	11	12	Pos.	Points	Ref
2021	Inception Racing with Optimum Motorsport	GTD	McLaren 720S GT3	McLaren M840T 4.0 L Turbo V8	DAY	SEB	MDO	DET	WGL	WGL	LIM	ELK	LGA	LBH	VIR	PET; 12	63rd	209	
2022	Inception Racing	GTD	McLaren 720S GT3	McLaren M840T 4.0 L Turbo V8	DAY; 5	SEB	LBH; 9	LGA; 13	MDO	DET	WGL	MOS	LIM	ELK	VIR	PET	41st	483	
2023	Inception Racing	GTD	McLaren 720S GT3 Evo	McLaren M840T 4.0 L Turbo V8	DAY; 3	SEB; 4	LBH; 6	MON; 5	WGL; 15	MOS; 2	LIM; 13	ELK; 2	VIR; 7	IMS; 16	PET; 19		6th	2853	
2024	Inception Racing	GTD	McLaren 720S GT3 Evo	McLaren M840T 4.0 L Turbo V8	DAY; 13	SEB; 7	LBH; 17	LGA; 14	WGL; 21	MOS; 3	ELK; 2	VIR; 13					9th	2308	
2024	Inception Racing	GTD	Ferrari 296 GT3	Ferrari F163CE 3.0 L Turbo V6									IMS; 9	PET; 7			9th	2308	
2025	Inception Racing	GTD	Ferrari 296 GT3	Ferrari F163CE 3.0 L Turbo V6	DAY; 19	SEB; 4	LBH; 8	LGA; 15	WGL; 2	MOS; 6	ELK; 13	VIR; 11	IMS; 1	PET; 18			10th	2405	
2026	Inception Racing	GTD	Ferrari 296 GT3 Evo	Ferrari F163CE 3.0 L Turbo V6	DAY; 13	SEB; 17	LBH; 4	LGA; 3	WGL	MOS; 7	ELK; 8	VIR; 3	IMS; 10	PET; 8			9th	2268	

=== Complete European Le Mans Series results ===
(key) (Races in bold indicate pole position; results in italics indicate fastest lap)

Year	Entrant	Class	Chassis	Engine	1	2	3	4	5	6	Rank	Points
2022	Car Guy Racing by Kessel Racing	LMGTE	Ferrari 488 GTE Evo	Ferrari F154CB 3.9 L Turbo V8	LEC; 5	IMO; DSQ	MNZ; 3	CAT; 4	**SPA**; 1	ALG; 3	2nd	78
2023	Kessel Racing	LMGTE	Ferrari 488 GTE Evo	Ferrari F154CB 3.9 L Turbo V8	CAT; 7	LEC; 4	ARA	SPA	POR	ALG	16th	18

=== Complete 24 Hours of Le Mans results ===
Year	Team	Co-Drivers	Car	Class	Laps	Pos.	Class Pos.
2022	(Switzerland) Kessel Racing	(Denmark) Mikkel Jensen (Japan) Takeshi Kimura	Ferrari 488 GTE Evo	GTE; Am	336	45th	12th
2024	(United Kingdom) Inception Racing	(United States) Brendan Iribe (United Kingdom) Ollie Millroy	McLaren 720S GT3 Evo	LMGT3	275	40th	13th

=== Complete Asian Le Mans Series results ===
(key) (Races in bold indicate pole position) (Races in italics indicate fastest lap)

Year	Team	Class	Car	Engine	1	2	3	4	Pos.	Points
2023	Car Guy Racing	GT	Ferrari 488 GT3 Evo 2020	Ferrari F154CB 3.9 L Turbo V8	DUB; 1; 14	DUB; 2 Ret	ABU; 1; 10	ABU; 2; 14	19th	1
