= Jack Hartshorne =

English footballer (1907–1971)

Personal information
- Full name: John Hartshorne
- Date of birth: 25 March 1907
- Place of birth: Willenhall, Staffordshire, England
- Date of death: 1971 (aged 63–64)
- Place of death: Stoke-on-Trent, England
- Position: Right back

Senior career*
Years	Team	Apps	(Gls)
- Short Heath
1932–1933	Stoke City	0	(0)
1934–1936	Macclesfield	65	(8)
1936–1945	Lincoln City	91	(0)
1946–1947	Grantham		
1947–19??	Boston United		
- * Club domestic league appearances and goals

John Hartshorne (25 March 1907 – 1971) was an English footballer who made 91 appearances in the Football League for Lincoln City, 100 appearances in all competitions, before moving back into non-league football with Grantham and Boston United. He played as a right back.

== Career statistics ==
Appearances and goals by club, season and competition
Club	Season	League			FA Cup		Other		Total	
Club	Season	Division	Apps	Goals	Apps	Goals	Apps	Goals	Apps	Goals
Stoke City	1932–33	Second Division	0	0	0	0	0	0	0	0
Lincoln City	1936–37	Third Division North	22	0	0	0	1 (Note: Appearances in Third Division North Cup)	0	23	0
Lincoln City	1937–38	Third Division North	29	0	3	0	0	0	32	0
Lincoln City	1938–39	Third Division North	40	0	3	0	0	0	43	0
Career total			91	0	6	0	1	0	98	0
