= 2015 Porsche Supercup =

23rd Porsche Supercup season

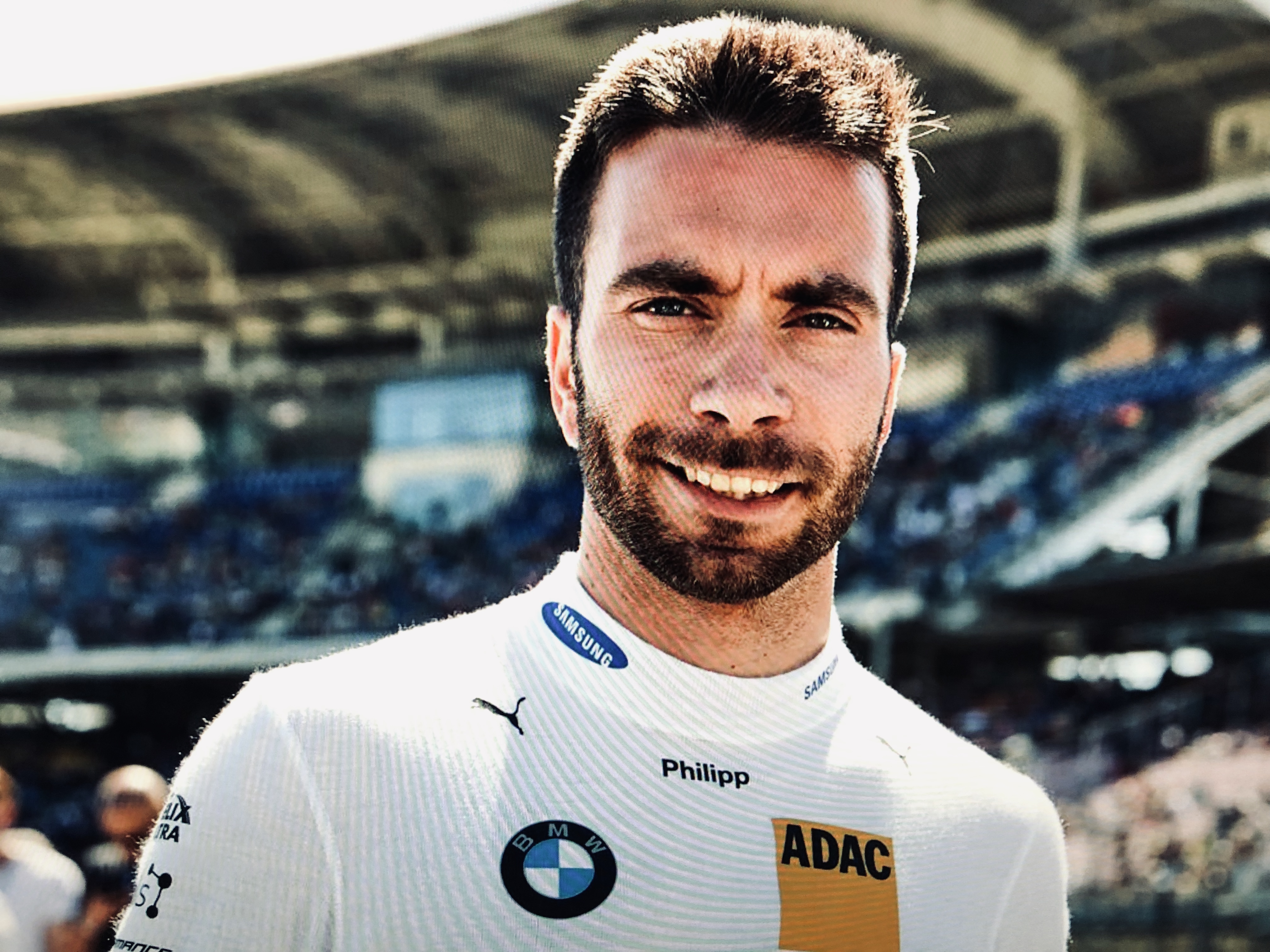
Philipp Eng (pictured in 2018) won the Drivers' Championship title

The 2015 Porsche Mobil 1 Supercup season was the 23rd Porsche Supercup season. It began on 10 May at Circuit de Barcelona-Catalunya and finished on 25 October at Circuit of the Americas, after eleven scheduled races, all of which were support events for the 2015 Formula One World Championship.

== Teams and drivers ==
Full list of drivers that participated in the 2015 season:

Team	No.	Drivers	Class	Rounds
(Austria) VERVA Lechner Racing Team	1	(Poland) Kuba Giermaziak		All
(Austria) VERVA Lechner Racing Team	2	(United States) Connor De Phillippi		All
(Austria) VERVA Lechner Racing Team	3	(United States) Michael Avenatti		1–2
(Austria) VERVA Lechner Racing Team	3	(Republic of Ireland) Ryan Cullen	R	4–8
(Austria) VERVA Lechner Racing Team	32	(Germany) Maximilian Werndl	G	1–2, 7–8
(Austria) Lechner Racing Middle East	4	(Germany) Sven Müller		All
(Austria) Lechner Racing Middle East	5	(Germany) Michael Ammermüller		All
(Austria) Lechner Racing Middle East	40	(Netherlands) Charlie Frijns	G	6
(Switzerland) Fach Auto Tech	6	(Switzerland) Philipp Frommenwiler	R	All
(Switzerland) Fach Auto Tech	7	(Switzerland) Simon Trummer	R	1
(Switzerland) Fach Auto Tech	7	(Netherlands) Jaap van Lagen		2
(Switzerland) Fach Auto Tech	7	(Austria) Christopher Zöchling		3–8
(Poland) Förch Racing by Lukas MS	8	(Germany) Patrick Eisemann	R	All
(Poland) Förch Racing by Lukas MS	9	(Germany) Chris Bauer	R	All
(Poland) Förch Racing by Lukas MS	19	(Poland) Robert Lukas		All
(Poland) Förch Racing by Lukas MS	57	(Mexico) Santiago Creel	G	7–8
(United States) MOMO Megatron Team PARTRAX	10	(United Kingdom) Ben Barker		All
(United States) MOMO Megatron Team PARTRAX	11	(Australia) Sam Power	R	All
(United States) MOMO Megatron Team PARTRAX	12	(United Kingdom) Cameron Twynham	R	1–5
(United States) MOMO Megatron Team PARTRAX	12	(United States) Jonathan Summerton	R	6
(United States) MOMO Megatron Team PARTRAX	12	(Netherlands) Jaap van Lagen		7
(United States) MOMO Megatron Team PARTRAX	12	(Luxembourg) Dylan Pereira	G	8
(United States) MOMO Megatron Team PARTRAX	62	(United Kingdom) Paul Rees	G	8
(Germany) MRS GT-Racing	14	(Germany) Christian Engelhart		All
(Germany) MRS GT-Racing	15	(Australia) Richard Goddard	R	All
(Germany) Market Leader by Project 1	16	(Italy) Matteo Cairoli	R	All
(Germany) Market Leader by Project 1	17	(Austria) Philipp Eng		All
(Germany) Market Leader by Project 1	33	(Spain) Alexander Toril	R	1–2, 7
(Germany) Market Leader by Project 1	33	(Germany) Nico Menzel	R	5–6
(Germany) Market Leader by Project 1	33	(United States) Colin Thompson	G	8
(Belgium) Speed Lover & Allure	18	(Belgium) Jean Glorieux		All
(Belgium) Speed Lover & Allure	20	(Belgium) Pierre Piron		1–2, 4, 6–8
(Belgium) Speed Lover & Allure	20	(Austria) Luca Rettenbacher	R	3
(Belgium) Speed Lover & Allure	25	(Luxembourg) Carlos Rivas		All
(Belgium) Speed Lover & Allure	34	(Netherlands) Roger Grouwels	G	2
(France) Martinet by Alméras	21	(Italy) Glauco Solieri		All
(France) Martinet by Alméras	22	(France) Côme Ledogar	R	All
(France) Martinet by Alméras	48	(Norway) Egidio Perfetti	G	6
(Austria) The Heart of Racing by Lechner	23	(Spain) Alex Riberas		All
(Austria) The Heart of Racing by Lechner	24	(Switzerland) Jeffrey Schmidt	R	All
(Austria) The Heart of Racing by Lechner	40	(Brazil) Pedro Piquet	G	3, 5
(France) Sébastien Loeb Racing	30	(France) Joffrey de Narda	G	1, 6
(France) Sébastien Loeb Racing	31	(Norway) Roar Lindland	G	1, 6–7
(France) Sébastien Loeb Racing	51	(France) Sébastien Loeb	G	6
(France) Sébastien Loeb Racing	51	(France) Maxime Jousse	G	7
(Germany) Konrad Motorsport	35	(Switzerland) Rolf Ineichen	G	3
(Germany) Konrad Motorsport	36	(France) Nicolas Armindo	G	3
(Italy) LEM Racing	37	(Finland) Aku Pellinen	G	3, 7
(Italy) LEM Racing	38	(Italy) Matteo Torta	G	3, 7
(Italy) LEM Racing	58	(China) Dasheng Zhang	G	7
(Italy) LEM Racing	59	(Italy) Stefano Colombo	G	7
(United Kingdom) Redline Racing	41	(United Kingdom) Daniel Cammish	G	4
(United Kingdom) Redline Racing	42	(United Kingdom) Jack Falla	G	4 (Note: Participated in practice of Round 4 in Silverstone.)
(United Kingdom) Team Parker Racing	43	(United Kingdom) Josh Webster	G	4
(United Kingdom) Team Parker Racing	44	(United Kingdom) Stephen Jelley	G	4
(United Kingdom) Team Parker Racing	45	(United Kingdom) Tom Sharp	G	4
(United Kingdom) IN2 Racing	46	(United Kingdom) Graeme Mundy	G	4
(United Kingdom) IN2 Racing	47	(United Kingdom) Jake Hill	G	4
(Germany) Land Motorsport	49	(Netherlands) Wolf Nathan	G	6, 8
(Germany) Land Motorsport	50	(New Zealand) Peter Scharmach	G	6
(Germany) Land Motorsport	50	(Denmark) Mikkel O. Pedersen	G	8
(Germany) Land Motorsport	52	(Netherlands) Jaap van Lagen	G	6
(Italy) Antonelli Motorsport	53	(Italy) Sergio Negroni	G	7
(Italy) Antonelli Motorsport	54	(Italy) Riccardo Agostini	G	7
(Italy) Antonelli Motorsport	60	(Italy) Alberto Cerqui	G	7
(Italy) Team Dinamic	55	(Italy) Mattia Drudi	G	7
(Italy) Team Dinamic	56	(Italy) Lorenzo Bontempelli	G	7
(Italy) Team Dinamic	61	(Italy) Alex de Giacomi	G	7
(Germany) Porsche AG	911	(United Kingdom) Johnny Herbert	G	5 (Note: Participated in practice of Round 5 in Hungaroring.)
(Germany) Porsche AG	911	(United States) Patrick Dempsey	G	6

Icon	Meaning
R	Rookie
G	Guest

== Race calendar and results ==
Full list of races that held during the 2015 season:

Round		Circuit	Date	Pole position	Fastest lap	Winning driver	Winning team
1		(Spain) Circuit de Barcelona-Catalunya	10 May	(Germany) Michael Ammermüller	(Germany) Michael Ammermüller	(Germany) Michael Ammermüller	(Austria) Lechner Racing Middle East
2		Circuit de Monaco	24 May	(Netherlands) Jaap van Lagen	(Germany) Christian Engelhart	(Netherlands) Jaap van Lagen	(Switzerland) Fach Auto Tech
3		(Austria) Red Bull Ring	21 June	(United States) Connor De Phillippi	(Germany) Michael Ammermüller	(Austria) Christopher Zöchling	(Switzerland) Fach Auto Tech
4		(United Kingdom) Silverstone Circuit	5 July	(Austria) Philipp Eng	(Spain) Alex Riberas	(Austria) Philipp Eng	(Germany) Market Leader by Project 1
5		(Hungary) Hungaroring	26 July	(Germany) Sven Müller	(Germany) Sven Müller	(Germany) Sven Müller	(Austria) Lechner Racing Middle East
6	R1	(Belgium) Circuit de Spa-Francorchamps	22 August	(Germany) Michael Ammermüller	(Germany) Michael Ammermüller	(Germany) Sven Müller	(Austria) Lechner Racing Middle East
6	R2	(Belgium) Circuit de Spa-Francorchamps	23 August	(Austria) Philipp Eng	(Spain) Alex Riberas	(Austria) Philipp Eng	(Germany) Market Leader by Project 1
7	R1	(Italy) Autodromo Nazionale Monza	5 September	(Germany) Michael Ammermüller	(Germany) Sven Müller	(Germany) Sven Müller	(Austria) Lechner Racing Middle East
7	R2	(Italy) Autodromo Nazionale Monza	6 September	(Italy) Matteo Cairoli	(Germany) Sven Müller	(Germany) Sven Müller	(Austria) Lechner Racing Middle East
8	R1	(United States) Circuit of the Americas	24 October	(Germany) Sven Müller (Note: After the cancellation of the qualifying session, the times of the free practice session were used to make the start grids of both Race 1 and Race 2.)	Race cancelled due to heavy rain fall		
8	R2	(United States) Circuit of the Americas	25 October	(Germany) Sven Müller	(Spain) Alex Riberas	(Spain) Alex Riberas	(Austria) The Heart of Racing by Lechner

=== Calendar changes ===
- The series was scheduled to run in support of the German Grand Prix, at a venue that, at the time of the calendar's publication, had not yet been decided. However, with the cancellation of the German Grand Prix, the planned Porsche Supercup meeting was similarly suspended. It was replaced by additional races at Spa-Francorchamps and Monza.

== Championship standings ==
=== Drivers' Championship ===
Pos.	Driver	CAT (Spain)	MON (Monaco)	RBR (Austria)	SIL (United Kingdom)	HUN (Hungary)	SPA (Belgium)		MNZ (Italy)		COA (United States)		Points
1	(Austria) Philipp Eng	4	2	2	**1**	6	2	**1**	6	7	C	8	145
2	(Germany) Sven Müller	Ret	10	10	Ret	**1**	1	2	1	1	**C**	**3**	126
3	(Germany) Michael Ammermüller	**1**	5	9	3	7	**Ret**	6	**3**	3	C	2	124
4	(Germany) Christian Engelhart	3	4	5	5	3	5	3	8	4	C	13	124
5	(Spain) Alex Riberas	5	6	3	2	5	11	7	7	6	C	1	122
6	(Austria) Christopher Zöchling			1	7	10	3	4	9	5	C	7	93
7	(Italy) Matteo Cairoli	14	8	7	6	11	8	Ret	2	**2**	C	11	83
8	(France) Côme Ledogar	6	12	11	8	2	4	Ret	4	8	C	DSQ	81
9	(United Kingdom) Ben Barker	9	3	19	4	12	6	8	Ret	DNS	C	6	69
10	(Switzerland) Jeffrey Schmidt	8	14	16	10	9	7	5	32†	9	C	4	67
11	(Poland) Kuba Giermaziak	2	9	12	11	4	9	14	Ret	13	C	Ret	63
12	(United States) Connor De Phillippi	11	7	**4**	14	13	18	9	17	11	C	5	53
13	(Poland) Robert Lukas	7	Ret	6	Ret	8	14	Ret	5	35†	C	9	51
14	(Switzerland) Philipp Frommenwiler	13	11	8	13	14	Ret	10	Ret	10	C	10	40
15	(Netherlands) Jaap van Lagen		**1**				12	27†	15	12			29
16	(Australia) Richard Goddard	17	15	15	12	15	16	24	13	15	C	18	21
17	(Australia) Sam Power	10	13	14	18	Ret	15	Ret	Ret	DNS	C	14	21
18	(Republic of Ireland) Ryan Cullen				Ret	Ret	19	12	20	22	C	15	10
19	(Germany) Patrick Eisemann	Ret	Ret	18	25	17	21	15	18	26	C	17	7
20	(United Kingdom) Cameron Twynham	12	16	21	19	16							5
21	(United States) Jonathan Summerton						17	19					3
22	(Luxembourg) Carlos Rivas	21	Ret	25	22	20	23	16	28	33	C	22	2
23	(Germany) Chris Bauer	20	Ret	24	21	18	27	Ret	23	23	C	19	1
24	(Spain) Alexander Toril	16	21†						Ret	DSQ			0
25	(Belgium) Pierre Piron	18	17		23		26	20	27	31	C	23	0
26	(Belgium) Jean Glorieux	23	19	23	24	19	DNS	DNS	30	25	C	21	0
27	(Italy) Glauco Solieri	24	20	26	27	21	25	26	25	27	C	DSQ	0
28	(Switzerland) Simon Trummer	22											0
29	(Austria) Luca Rettenbacher			22									0
30	(Germany) Nico Menzel					DSQ	31†	25					0
31	(United States) Michael Avenatti	25	DNQ										0
32	(United States) Colin Thompson										C	Ret	0
Guest drivers ineligible for points
	(United Kingdom) Daniel Cammish				9								0
	(France) Joffrey de Narda	Ret					10	13					0
	(Italy) Riccardo Agostini								10	17			0
	(Italy) Mattia Drudi								11	16			0
	(Netherlands) Charlie Frijns						22	11					0
	(Italy) Alberto Cerqui								12	19			0
	(United Kingdom) Paul Rees										C	12	0
	(France) Sébastien Loeb						13	Ret					0
	(Switzerland) Rolf Ineichen			13									0
	(France) Maxime Jousse								14	14			0
	(Germany) Maximilian Werndl	15	18						24	24	C	16	0
	(United Kingdom) Stephen Jelley				15								0
	(Italy) Stefano Colombo								16	Ret			0
	(United Kingdom) Jake Hill				16								0
	(Norway) Roar Lindland	19					24	17	26	20			0
	(United Kingdom) Josh Webster				17								0
	(France) Nicolas Armindo			17									0
	(China) Dasheng Zhang								19	18			0
	(Norway) Egidio Perfetti						20	18					0
	(Mexico) Santiago Creel								29	28	C	20	0
	(Finland) Aku Pellinen			20					31	29			0
	(United Kingdom) Tom Sharp				20								0
	(Italy) Alex de Giacomi								22	21			0
	(Netherlands) Wolf Nathan						28	21			C	Ret	0
	(Italy) Lorenzo Bontempelli								21	34			0
	(New Zealand) Peter Scharmach						30	22					0
	(United States) Patrick Dempsey						29	23					0
	(United Kingdom) Graeme Mundy				26								0
	(Brazil) Pedro Piquet			27		DSQ							0
	(Italy) Matteo Torta			28					Ret	32			0
	(Italy) Sergio Negroni								Ret	30			0
	(Denmark) Mikkel O. Pedersen										C	DSQ	0
	(Luxembourg) Dylan Pereira										C	Ret	0
	(Netherlands) Roger Grouwels		DNQ										0
	(United Kingdom) Jack Falla				PO								0
	(United Kingdom) Johnny Herbert					PO							0
Pos.	Driver	CAT (Spain)	MON (Monaco)	RBR (Austria)	SIL (United Kingdom)	HUN (Hungary)	SPA (Belgium)		MNZ (Italy)		COA (United States)		Points

Colour	Result
Gold	Winner
Silver	Second place
Bronze	Third place
Green	Points classification
Blue	Non-points classification
Blue	Non-classified finish (NC)
Purple	Retired, not classified (Ret)
Red	Did not qualify (DNQ)
Red	Did not pre-qualify (DNPQ)
Black	Disqualified (DSQ)
White	Did not start (DNS)
White	Withdrew (WD)
White	Race cancelled (C)
Blank	Did not practice (DNP)
Blank	Did not arrive (DNA)
Blank	Excluded (EX)

**Bold** – Pole
Italics – Fastest Lap

Rookie

Notes

† – Drivers did not finish the race, but were classified as they completed over 75% of the race distance.
