= Mattia Drudi =

Italian racing driver

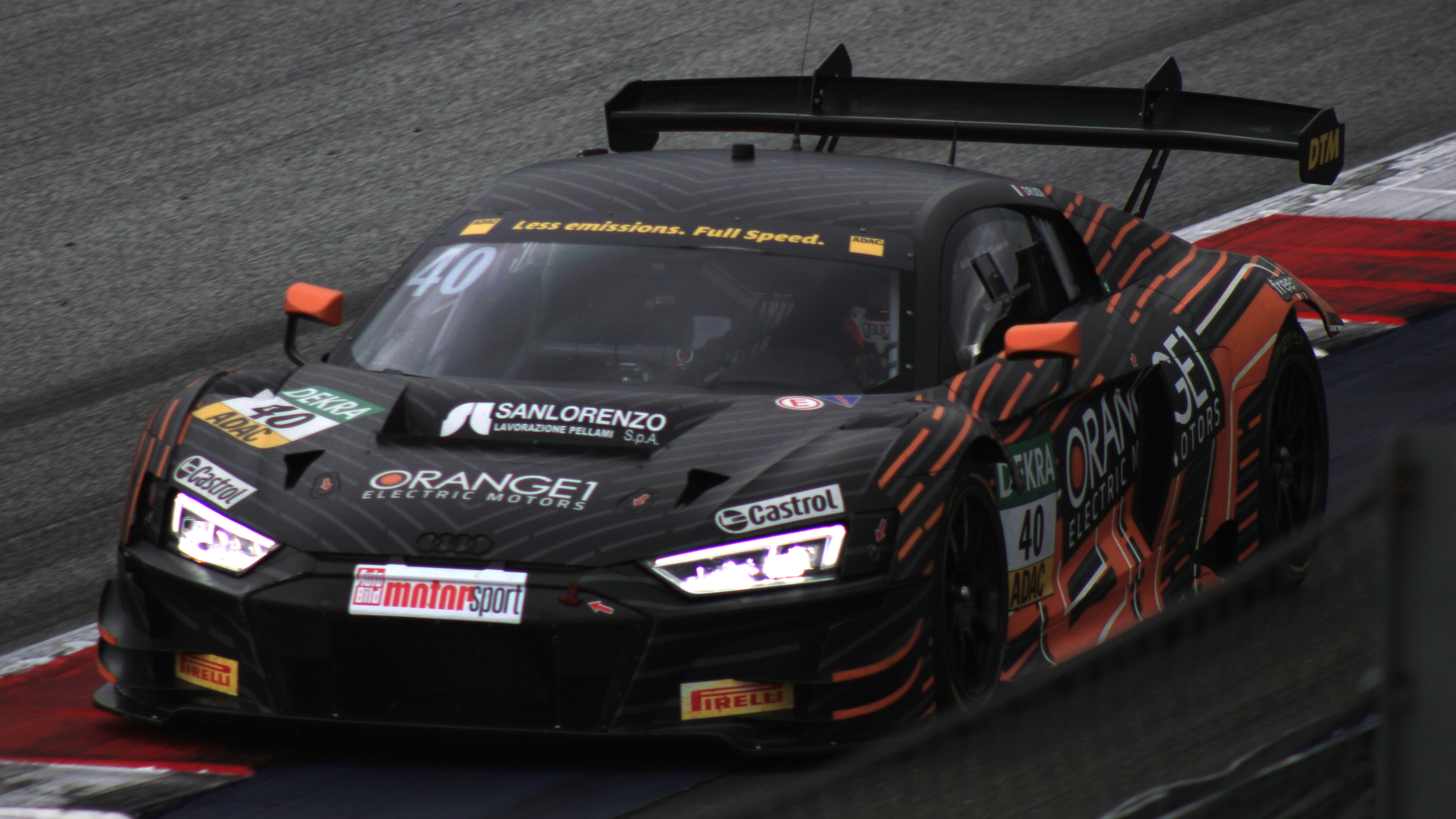
- Drudi competing in the DTM in 2023
- Nationality: (Italy) Italian
- Born: 16 July 1998 (age 28) Naples, Italy

GT World Challenge Europe Endurance Cup career
- Debut season: 2019
- Current team: Attempto Racing
- Categorisation: FIA Silver (until 2019); FIA Gold (2020–2022); FIA Platinum (2023–)
- Car number: 66
- Starts: 24
- Wins: 12
- Podiums: 8
- Poles: 4
- Fastest laps: 0

Previous series
- 2019–2020 2015–2018 2015–2017 2015 2015 2014: 24H Series; Porsche Supercup; Porsche Carrera Cup Italia; ADAC Formula 4 Porsche Carrera Cup Germany; Italian F4 Championship

Championship titles
- 2021 2023: Italian GT Championship – GT3 Endurance; GT World Challenge Europe Sprint Cup
- Statistics up to date as of 8 December 2023.

Mattia Drudi (born 16 July 1998) is an Italian racing driver who currently competes in the FIA World Endurance Championship for Heart of Racing Team as an Aston Martin factory driver.

== Career ==
=== Early career ===
Drudi begin his karting career in 2005, at the age of seven, in his native Italy. In 2009, he claimed three karting titles, taking the 60cc class titles in the Easykart Italy, Easykart European (Cadet), and Campeonato Area Centro series. Two years later, he won the 100cc class of the Easykart European series; his final major championship in karting before transitioning to single-seaters after 2014.

Drudi began his single-seater career in Formula 4 machinery, taking part in the Italian F4 Championship, first with Cram Motorsport before finishing the season with F & M. In just his fifth race in the championship (the second race at Imola), Drudi scored his first victory in the series. Drudi would finish the season second in the championship, with five races victories and ten podiums. Three of these victories came in a weekend sweep at Monza in September. In the offseason, Drudi conducted a series of tests with Campos Racing in Formula Three machinery, but elected to stay at the F4 level for 2015, joining SMG Swiss Motorsport Group for the inaugural season of the ADAC Formula 4 series.

=== Sports car racing ===
==== Porsche spec series ====
In late 2014, Drudi competed in the annual Porsche Italia rookie test, where he was identified by Maurizio Lusuardi of Dinamic Motorsport, who wished to field an entry for Mattia in the Porsche Carrera Cup Italy for 2015. His single-seater commitments initially derailed this move, but in March 2015, Drudi officially signed with the team to compete full-time in the national spec series. In his debut season, Drudi claimed nine podiums and one victory in 13 races, finishing third in the championship. Drudi's season also included one-off Guest-class appearances in both the Porsche Supercup and Porsche Carrera Cup Germany. 2016 would see Drudi continue with Dinamic Motorsport, taking nine wins and 16 podiums en route to a second-place finish in the 2016 Porsche Carrera Cup Italia. He made a further three appearances as a guest in the Porsche Supercup in 2016, taking a podium at his home race at Monza. For 2017, Drudi competed full-time in the Porsche Supercup for the first time in his career, once again with Dinamic Motorsport. Through the 11-race season, he claimed one podium, once again at Monza, taking sixth in the championship. His final season in the series in 2018 saw him claim four podiums en route to a fifth-place finish in the championship.

==== GT racing ====
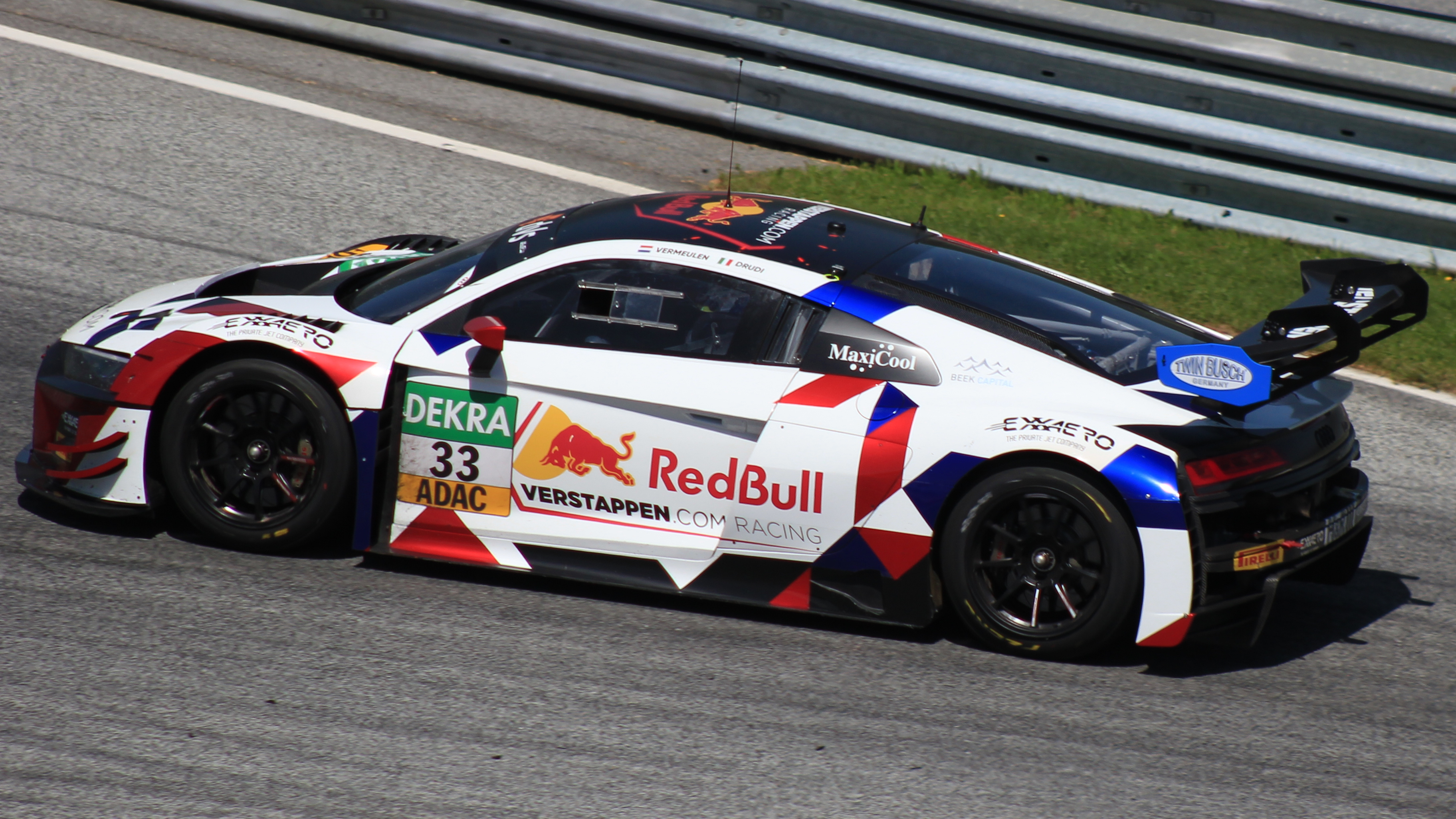
Drudi competing in the ADAC GT Masters in 2022

In late 2018, Drudi made his debut in the Italian GT Championship, driving for Audi Sport Italia. In his third race with the team, at Monza, he and co-driver Bar Baruch won the GT3 class, marking Drudi's first race victory in GT3 machinery. In August 2018, Drudi made his debut in prototype machinery, competing with Eurointernational at the Silverstone and Spa rounds of the 2018 European Le Mans Series. His Ligier JS P3 finished tenth and 13th in class respectively.

In February 2019, Drudi was signed to Audi's factory GT lineup, joining the marque's customer racing roster. His 2019 season primarily consisted of a dual GT World Challenge Europe Sprint Cup and Endurance Cup campaign with Attempto Racing, alongside a partial season in the ADAC GT Masters with EFP Car Collection by TECE. He found his greatest successes that season in the Sprint Cup, where he and co-driver Milan Dontje would claim five podiums and a class victory competing in the Silver Cup class. Prior to the 2020 season, Drudi and fellow Audi factory driver Kelvin van der Linde took part in the mid-season Formula E rookie test. For 2020, Drudi moved to the Pro class with Attempto Racing, adding a trio of appearances in the Intercontinental GT Challenge. In October, he partnered with Patric Niederhauser and Frédéric Vervisch to finish second overall at the 24 Hours of Spa. The podium finish helped boost he and Vervisch's position in the 2020 GT World Challenge Europe Endurance Cup classification, but a 36th-place finish and retirement in the opening two rounds would force the pair to settle for 12th in the overall standings. The 2021 GT World Challenge Europe campaign saw Drudi's entries score no podiums and a combined 13.5 points, enough for 25th and 26th in the Endurance and Sprint Cups respectively. However, Drudi found great success in 2021 in another endurance cup, taking the GT3-class crown in the 2021 Italian GT Championship Endurance Cup. It marked Drudi's first championship title in seven years of competition in senior motorsport.

2022 saw Drudi join Car Collection Motorsport's entry in the GT World Challenge Europe, taking part in both the Sprint and Endurance Cups. Drudi expressed his confidence ahead of the season, claiming that the team could fight for overall race victories. Alongside Luca Ghiotto and Christopher Haase in the Endurance Cup, Drudi finished 24th in the overall points classification, scoring all twelve points in a fourth-place finish at Imola. In the Sprint Cup, with Ghiotto again as his co-driver, Drudi would come home tenth, registering a season-high finish of fifth at Magny-Cours.

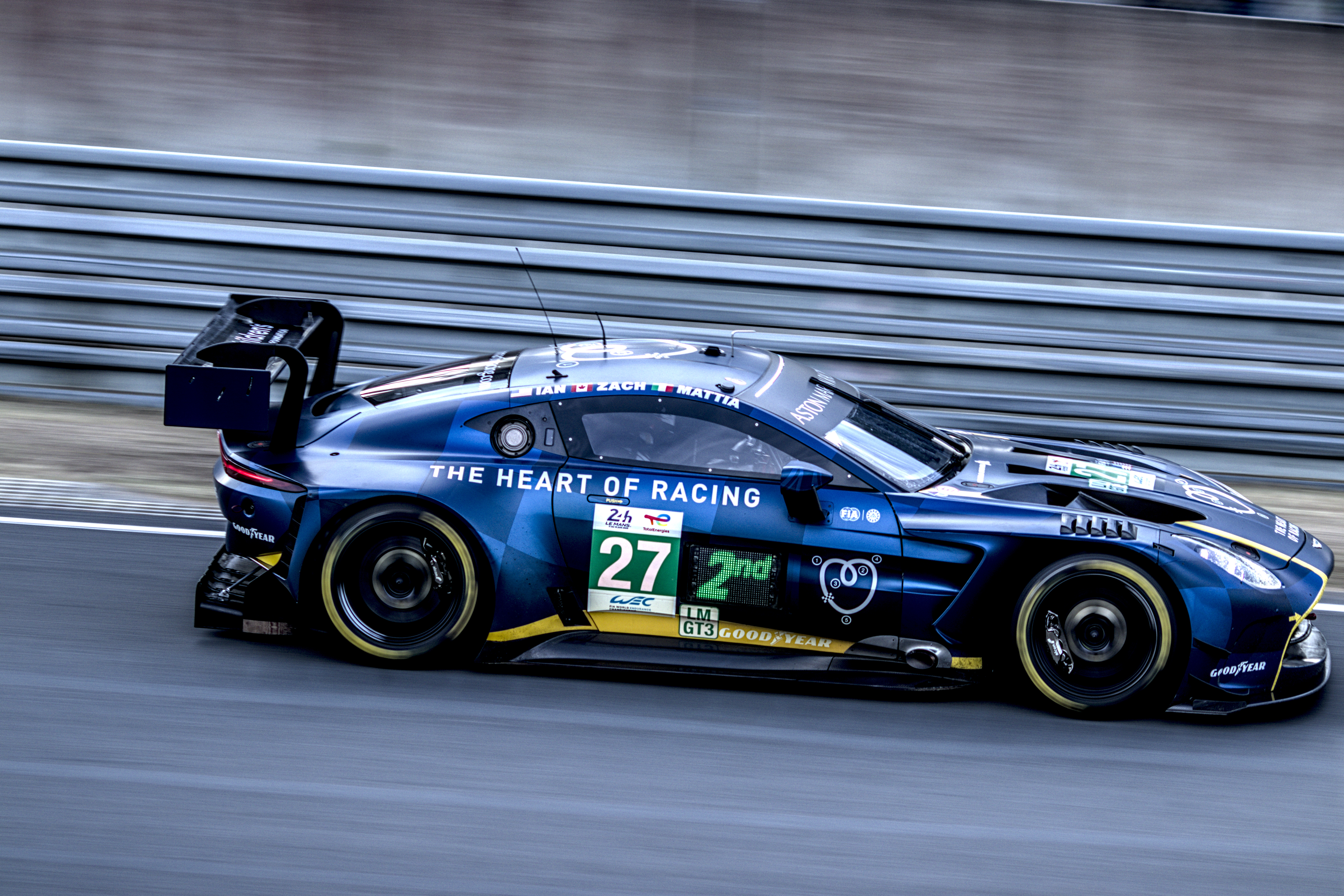
Drudi's Heart of Racing Aston Martin at the 2025 24 Hours of Le Mans.

Drudi began his 2023 campaign at the Bathurst 12 Hour, although his car would retire early in the race following a crash. Drudi returned to his factory driver duties at the Kyalami 9 Hours, where he finished third overall alongside co-drivers Ricardo Feller and Patric Niederhauser. His partnership with Feller continued throughout the 2023 season, where the two shared Tresor Orange1's Audi for the full GT World Challenge Europe campaign. Fellow factory driver Dennis Marschall joined the entry for the Endurance Cup. 2023 also saw Drudi make his debut in DTM, once again competing for Tresor Orange1. Drudi enjoyed his most significant successes of the season in Sprint Cup, where he won four races alongside Feller en route to the overall championship. Through ten races, the duo tallied seven podiums and two pole positions. Drudi suffered a difficult maiden season in DTM competition, however, failing to finish half of the 16 races and placing no higher than 11th in any individual race. He would end the season 26th in the drivers' championship with twelve points. At the conclusion of the 2023 season, Drudi parted ways with Audi Sport.

== Personal life ==
Drudi's father, Luca, is a former racing driver. Luca is a two-time 24 Hours of Le Mans class winner, taking victory with Viper Team Oreca in 1998 and Seikel Motorsport in 2001.

Drudi lives in San Marino and has raced under a Sammarinese licence.

== Racing record ==
=== Career summary ===
Season	Series	Team	Races	Wins	Poles	F/Laps	Podiums	Points	Position
2014	Italian F4 Championship	Cram Motorsport	3	0	0	0	0	237	**2nd**
2014	Italian F4 Championship	F & M	18	5	4	5	10	237	**2nd**
2015	ADAC Formula 4 Championship	SMG Swiss Motorsport	7	0	0	0	1	48	14th
2015	Porsche Carrera Cup Italia	Dinamic Motorsport	13	1	0	1	9	145	**3rd**
2015	Porsche Supercup	Dinamic Motorsport	2	0	0	0	0	0	NC
2015	Porsche Carrera Cup Germany - Class A	Dinamic Motorsport	2	0	0	0	0	0	NC
2016	Porsche Carrera Cup Italia	Dinamic Motorsport	21	9	8	6	16	208	**2nd**
2016	Porsche Supercup	Dinamic Motorsport	3	0	0	1	1	0	NC
2016	24H Series - 991	DINAMIC SRL							
2017	Porsche Supercup	Dinamic Motorsport	11	0	0	0	2	91	6th
2017	Porsche Carrera Cup Italia	Dinamic Motorsport	2	1	0	2	2	33	13th
2017	Porsche GT3 Cup Challenge Central Europe	Dinamic Motorsport	2	0	1	0	0	0	NC
2018	Porsche Supercup	Dinamic Motorsport	10	0	0	0	4	109	5th
2018	Italian GT Championship - GT3	Audi Sport Italia	4	1	0	0	2	46	11th
2018	European Le Mans Series - LMP3	Eurointernational	2	0	1	1	0	2.25	30th
2019	Blancpain GT Series Sprint Cup	Attempto Racing	10	0	0	0	0	8	18th
2019	Blancpain GT Series Endurance Cup	Attempto Racing	5	0	0	0	0	2	33rd
2019	24H GT Series - A6 Pro	Attempto Racing	1	0	0	0	0	?	?
2019	Italian GT Championship - GT3	Audi Sport Italia	2	0	1	0	1	12	10th
2019	ADAC GT Masters	EFP Car Collection by TECE	12	0	0	0	0	19	27th
2019	VLN Series - V5	PROsport Performance	2	1	0	0	1	?	?
2019–20	Formula E	Audi Sport ABT Schaeffler	Test driver						
2020	Italian GT Championship - Endurance (GT3)	Audi Sport Italia	3	1	1	0	2	35	4th
2020	Nürburgring Endurance Series - SP9 Pro	Audi Sport Team	4	1	0	0	1	25.67	7th
2020	Intercontinental GT Challenge	Audi Sport Team Valvoline	1	0	0	0	0	28	8th
2020	Intercontinental GT Challenge	Audi Sport Team Attempto Racing	1	0	0	0	1	28	8th
2020	Intercontinental GT Challenge	Audi Sport Team Car Collection	1	0	0	0	0	28	8th
2020	GT World Challenge Europe Sprint Cup	Attempto Racing	10	0	0	0	1	25	11th
2020	GT World Challenge Europe Endurance Cup	Attempto Racing	4	0	1	1	1	26	12th
2020	24H GT Series - GT3-Pro	Attempto Racing	1	0	0	0	0	16	?
2020	Nürburgring Langstrecken-Serie - SP9	Audi Sport Team	4	1	0	0	1	25.67	7th
2020	24 Hours of Nürburgring - SP9	Audi Sport Team Land	1	0	0	0	0	N/A	6th
2021	Italian GT Championship - Endurance (GT3)	Audi Sport Italia	4	3	0	0	3	60	**1st**
2021	Intercontinental GT Challenge	Audi Sport Team Attempto	1	0	0	0	0	19	10th
2021	Intercontinental GT Challenge	Audi Sport Team WRT	2	0	0	0	0	19	10th
2021	GT World Challenge Europe Endurance Cup	Attempto Racing	5	0	0	0	0	7	25th
2021	GT World Challenge Europe Sprint Cup	Attempto Racing	8	0	0	0	0	6.5	26th
2021	European Le Mans Series - LMP3	Eurointernational	1	0	0	0	0	4	35th
2021	ADAC GT Masters	Rutronik Racing by TECE	2	0	0	0	0	8	39th
2021	ADAC GT Masters	Phoenix Racing	0	0	0	0	0	8	39th
2021	Nürburgring Langstrecken-Serie - SP9	Audi Sport Team Land	1	0	0	0	0	0	NC
2021	Nürburgring Langstrecken-Serie - SP9	Lionspeed by Car Collection Motorsport	3	0	0	0	0	0	NC
2021	24 Hours of Nürburgring - SP9	Audi Sport Team Phoenix	1	0	0	0	0	N/A	DNF
2022	GT World Challenge Europe Endurance Cup	Tresor by Car Collection	5	0	0	0	0	12	24th
2022	GT World Challenge Europe Sprint Cup	Tresor by Car Collection	10	0	0	0	0	22	10th
2022	ADAC GT Masters	Car Collection Motorsport	14	0	0	0	1	51	23rd
2022	Intercontinental GT Challenge	Audi Sport Team Tresor							
2022	Nürburgring Langstrecken-Serie - SP9	Lionspeed by Car Collection	1	0	0	0	0	0	NC
2022	24 Hours of Nürburgring - SP9	Audi Sport Team Lionspeed by Car Collection	1	0	0	0	0	N/A	6th
2023	Deutsche Tourenwagen Masters	Tresor Orange1	16	0	0	0	0	13	26th
2023	GT World Challenge Europe Endurance Cup	Tresor Orange1	5	0	0	0	1	47	5th
2023	GT World Challenge Europe Sprint Cup	Tresor Orange1	10	4	1	1	7	109.5	**1st**
2023	Nürburgring Langstrecken-Serie - SP9	Audi Sport Team Scherer PHX	2	0	0	0	0	0	NC
2023	24 Hours of Nürburgring - SP9	Audi Sport Team Scherer PHX	1	0	0	0	0	N/A	DNF
2024	GT World Challenge Europe Endurance Cup	Comtoyou Racing	5	1	0	0	1	55	4th
2024	GT World Challenge Europe Sprint Cup	Comtoyou Racing	9	0	0	0	1	17	11th
2024–25	Asian Le Mans Series - GT	Earl Bamber Motorsport	4	0	0	0	2	46	5th
2025	FIA World Endurance Championship - LMGT3	Heart of Racing Team	8	0	1	0	1	86	4th
2025	IMSA SportsCar Championship - GTD	Heart of Racing Team	1	0	0	0	1	324	61st
2025	GT World Challenge Europe Endurance Cup	Comtoyou Racing	5	0	0	1	1	37	8th
2025	Nürburgring Langstrecken-Serie - SP9	Walkenhorst Motorsport	3	0	0	0	1	0	NC
2025	24 Hours of Nürburgring - SP9	Walkenhorst Motorsport	1	0	0	0	0	N/A	DNF
2026	FIA World Endurance Championship - LMGT3	Heart of Racing Team	8	1	1	1	3	64	10th
2026	IMSA SportsCar Championship - GTD	Heart of Racing Team	1	0	1	0	1	335	58th
2026	Nürburgring Langstrecken-Serie - SP9	Walkenhorst Motorsport	1	0	0	0	0	0	NC
2026	24 Hours of Nürburgring - SP9	natural elements by Walkenhorst Motorsport	1	0	0	0	1	N/A	**2nd**
2026	GT World Challenge Europe Endurance Cup	Comtoyou Racing	5	2	1	2	2	59	**2nd**
2026	IMSA SportsCar Championship - GTD Pro	Car Blanche	1	1	0	0	1	382	31st
2026	FIA World Endurance Championship - Hypercar	Aston Martin THOR Team	Reserve driver						
2026	IMSA SportsCar Championship - GTP	Aston Martin THOR Team	Reserve driver						
2026–27	Asian Le Mans Series - GT3	Heart of Racing Team							

^{*} Season still in progress.

=== Complete Italian F4 Championship results ===
(key) (Races in bold indicate pole position; races in italics indicate fastest lap)

Year	Team	1	2	3	4	5	6	7	8	9	10	11	12	13	14	15	16	17	18	19	20	21	DC	Points
2014	Cram Motorsport	ADR; 1; 6	ADR; 2; 11	ADR; 3 Ret																			2nd	237
2014	F & M				IMO1; 1; 8	IMO1; 2; 1	IMO1; 3; 14	MUG; 1; 4	MUG; 2; 5	MUG; 3; 18	MAG; 1; 4	MAG; 2; 4	MAG; 3; 4	VLL; 1; 4	VLL; 2; 9	VLL; 3; 3	**MNZ**; **1**; 1	MNZ; 2; 1	MNZ; 3; 1	IMO2; 1; 5	IMO2; 2 Ret	IMO2; 3; 2	2nd	237

=== Complete ADAC Formula 4 Championship results ===
(key) (Races in bold indicate pole position) (Races in italics indicate fastest lap)

Year	Team	1	2	3	4	5	6	7	8	9	10	11	12	13	14	15	16	17	18	19	20	21	22	23	24	DC	Points
2015	SMG Swiss Motorsport	OSC1; 1; 3	OSC1; 2; 5	OSC1; 3; 7	RBR; 1; 8	RBR; 2; 4	RBR; 3 Ret	SPA; 1 DNS	SPA; 2; 10	SPA; 3 DNS	LAU; 1	LAU; 2	LAU; 3	NÜR; 1	NÜR; 2	NÜR; 3	SAC; 1	SAC; 2	SAC; 3	OSC2; 1	OSC2; 2	OSC2; 3	HOC; 1	HOC; 2	HOC; 3	14th	48

=== Complete Porsche Carrera Cup Italia results ===
(key) (Races in bold indicate pole position) (Races in italics indicate fastest lap)

Year	Team	1	2	3	4	5	6	7	8	9	10	11	12	13	14	15	16	17	18	19	20	21	Pos.	Points
2015	Dinamic Motorsport	MNZ1; 1; 13	MNZ1; 2; 4	IMO; 1; 3	IMO; 2; 3	MUG1; 1; 4	MUG1; 2; 4	SPA; 9	VLL; 1; 3	VLL; 2; 1	MIS; 1; 3	MIS; 2; 2	MUG2; 1; 2	MUG2; 2; 2									3rd	145
2016	Dinamic Motorsport	MNZ; 1 Ret	MNZ; 2; 2	MNZ; 3; 2	IMO1; 1; 2	IMO1; 2; 1	IMO1; 3 Ret	**MIS**; **1**; 1	**MIS**; **2**; 1	**MIS**; **3**; 1	MUG1; 1; 4	MUG1; 2; 2	MUG1; 3; 12	VLL; 1; 2	**VLL**; **2**; 2	VLL; 3; 1	**IMO2**; **1**; 1	IMO2; 2; 1	IMO2; 3; 13	**MUG2**; **1**; 3	**MUG2**; **2**; 1	**MUG2**; **3**; 1	2nd	208
2017	Dinamic Motorsport	IMO1; 1	IMO1; 2	MIS; 1	MIS; 2	VLL; 1	VLL; 2	MUG1; 1	MUG1; 2	IMO2; 1	IMO2; 2	MUG2; 1	MUG2; 2	MNZ; 1; 2	MNZ; 2; 1								13th	33

=== Complete Porsche Supercup results ===
(key) (Races in bold indicate pole position) (Races in italics indicate fastest lap)

Year	Team	1	2	3	4	5	6	7	8	9	10	11	Pos.	Pts
2015	Dinamic Motorsport	CAT	MON	RBR	SIL	HUN	SPA	SPA	MNZ; 11	MNZ; 16	USA	USA	NC†	0
2016	Dinamic Motorsport	CAT	MON	RBR; 9	SIL	HUN	HOC; 10	SPA	MNZ; 3	COA	COA		NC†	0
2017	Dinamic Motorsport	CAT; 7	CAT; Ret	MON; 11	RBR; 4	SIL; 8	HUN; 5	SPA; 2	SPA; 19	MNZ; 3	MEX; 26†	MEX; 7	6th	91
2018	Dinamic Motorsport	CAT; 10	MON; 7	RBR; 9	SIL; 3	HOC; 2	HUN; 11	SPA; 3	MNZ; 3	MEX; 8	MEX; 8		5th	109

† As Drudi was a guest driver, he was ineligible for points

=== Complete ADAC GT Masters results ===
(key) (Races in bold indicate pole position) (Races in italics indicate fastest lap)

Year	Team	Car	1	2	3	4	5	6	7	8	9	10	11	12	13	14	DC	Points
2019	EFP Car Collection by TECE	Audi R8 LMS Evo	OSC; 1; 11	OSC; 2; 19	MST; 1; 7	MST; 2; 14	RBR; 1; 15	RBR; 2 Ret	ZAN; 1 Ret	ZAN; 2; 18	NÜR; 1; 28	NÜR; 2; 15	HOC; 1 Ret	HOC; 2; 20	SAC; 1	SAC; 2	27th	19
2021	Rutronik Racing by TECE	Audi R8 LMS Evo	OSC; 1	OSC; 2	RBR; 1	RBR; 2	ZAN; 1	ZAN; 2	LAU; 1	LAU; 2	SAC; 1; 20	SAC; 2; 8	HOC; 1	HOC; 2			39th	8
2021	Phoenix Racing	Audi R8 LMS Evo													NÜR; 1 DNS	NÜR; 2 DNS	39th	8
2022	Car Collection Motorsport	Audi R8 LMS Evo II	OSC; 1; 16	OSC; 2; 9	RBR; 1; 21†	RBR; 2 Ret	ZAN; 1; 16	ZAN; 2; 2	NÜR; 1 Ret	NÜR; 2; 19†	LAU; 1; 13	LAU; 2; 15	SAC; 1; 10	SAC; 2; 12	HOC; 1; 17†	HOC; 2; 7	23rd	51

=== Complete 24 Hours of Nürburgring results ===
Year	Team	Co-drivers	Car	Class	Laps	Pos.	Class pos.
2020	(Germany) Audi Sport Team Land	(South Africa) Kelvin van der Linde (Germany) Christopher Mies (Germany) René Rast	Audi R8 LMS Evo	SP9 Pro	85	6th	6th
2021	(Germany) Audi Sport Team Phoenix	(Netherlands) Robin Frijns (Germany) Frank Stippler (Belgium) Dries Vanthoor	Audi R8 LMS Evo	SP9	17	DNF	DNF
2022	(Germany) Audi Sport Team Lionspeed by Car Collection	(Germany) Patrick Kolb (Germany) Christopher Mies (Switzerland) Patric Niederhauser	Audi R8 LMS Evo II	SP9 Pro	80	DNF	DNF
2023	(Germany) Audi Sport Team Scherer PHX	(Switzerland) Ricardo Feller (Denmark) Dennis Lind (Belgium) Frédéric Vervisch	Audi R8 LMS Evo II	SP9 Pro	159	6th	6th
2025	(Germany) Walkenhorst Motorsport	(Norway) Christian Krognes (United Kingdom) David Pittard (Denmark) Nicki Thiim	Aston Martin Vantage AMR GT3 Evo	SP9 Pro	72	DNF	DNF
2026	(Germany) natural elements by Walkenhorst Motorsport	(Norway) Christian Krognes (Denmark) Nicki Thiim	Aston Martin Vantage AMR GT3 Evo	SP9 Pro	156	**2nd**	**2nd**

=== Complete GT World Challenge Europe results ===
==== GT World Challenge Europe Endurance Cup ====
Year	Team	Car	Class	1	2	3	4	5	6	7	Pos.	Points
2019	Attempto Racing	Audi R8 LMS Evo	Silver	MNZ; 24	**SIL**; 9	**LEC**; Ret	**SPA**; **6H**; 15	**SPA**; **12H**; 62	**SPA**; **24H**; Ret	CAT; 15	6th	46
2020	Attempto Racing	Audi R8 LMS Evo	Pro	**IMO**; 36	NÜR; Ret	SPA; 6H; 5	SPA; 12H; 10	SPA; 24H; 2	LEC; 9		12th	26
2021	Attempto Racing	Audi R8 LMS Evo	Pro	MNZ; 12	LEC; 14	SPA; 6H; 29	SPA; 12H; 5	SPA; 24H; 9	NÜR; 11	CAT; 40	25th	7
2022	Tresor by Car Collection	Audi R8 LMS Evo II	Pro	IMO; 4	LEC; 12	SPA; 6H; Ret	SPA; 12H; Ret	SPA; 24H; Ret	HOC; 38	CAT; 42	24th	12
2023	Tresor Orange1	Audi R8 LMS Evo II	Pro	MNZ; 5	LEC; Ret	SPA; 6H; 6	SPA; 12H; 1	SPA; 24H; 7	NÜR; 3	CAT; Ret	5th	47
2024	Comtoyou Racing	Aston Martin Vantage AMR GT3 Evo	Pro	LEC; 7	SPA; 6H; 1	SPA; 12H; 7	SPA; 24H; 1	NÜR; 6	MNZ; 24	JED; 10	4th	55
2025	Comtoyou Racing	Aston Martin Vantage AMR GT3 Evo	Pro	LEC; 5	MNZ; 3	SPA; 6H; 6	SPA; 12H; 62†	SPA; 24H; Ret	NÜR; 7	CAT; 34	8th	37
2026	Comtoyou Racing	Aston Martin Vantage AMR GT3 Evo	Pro	LEC; 1	MNZ; Ret	SPA; 6H; 11	SPA; 12H; 22	SPA; 24H; Ret	**NÜR**; 1	ALG; Ret	2nd	59

==== GT World Challenge Europe Sprint Cup ====
Year	Team	Car	Class	1	2	3	4	5	6	7	8	9	10	Pos.	Points
2019	Attempto Racing	Audi R8 LMS Evo	Silver	BRH; 1; 10	BRH; 2; 9	MIS; 1; 9	MIS; 2; 18	ZAN; 1; 16	**ZAN**; **2**; 9	**NÜR**; **1**; 6	NÜR; 2; 15	HUN; 1; 12	HUN; 2; 15	3rd	97
2020	Attempto Racing	Audi R8 LMS Evo	Pro	MIS; 1; 15	MIS; 2; 6	MIS; 3; 3	MAG; 1; 6	MAG; 2 Ret	ZAN; 1; 8	ZAN; 2 Ret	CAT; 1; 11	CAT; 2 Ret	CAT; 3; 6	11th	25
2021	Attempto Racing	Audi R8 LMS Evo	Pro	MAG; 1; 6	MAG; 2; 12	ZAN; 1; 14	ZAN; 2; 17	MIS; 1	MIS; 2	BRH; 1; 15	BRH; 2; 14	VAL; 1; 8	VAL; 2; 11	26th	6.5
2022	Tresor by Car Collection	Audi R8 LMS Evo II	Pro	BRH; 1; 6	BRH; 2; 7	MAG; 1; 5	MAG; 2; 8	ZAN; 1; 8	ZAN; 2; 13	MIS; 1; 11	MIS; 2; 21	VAL; 1; 6	VAL; 2; 13	10th	22
2023	Tresor Orange1	Audi R8 LMS Evo II	Pro	BRH; 1; 2	BRH; 2; 1	MIS; 1; 10	MIS; 2 Ret	HOC; 1; 1	HOC; 2; 4	VAL; 1; 3	VAL; 2; 2	**ZAN**; **1**; 1	ZAN; 2; 1	1st	109.5
2024	Comtoyou Racing	Aston Martin Vantage AMR GT3 Evo	Pro	BRH; 1 Ret	BRH; 2; 14	MIS; 1; 10	MIS; 2; 33†	HOC; 1; 17	HOC; 2; 6	MAG; 1; 15	MAG; 2 DNS	CAT; 1 Ret	CAT; 2; 2	11th	17

^{*}Season still in progress.

=== Complete Deutsche Tourenwagen Masters results ===
(key) (Races in bold indicate pole position; races in italics indicate fastest lap)

Year	Entrant	Chassis	1	2	3	4	5	6	7	8	9	10	11	12	13	14	15	16	Rank	Points
2023	Tresor Orange1	Audi R8 LMS Evo II	OSC; 1 Ret	OSC; 2 Ret	ZAN; 1; 18	ZAN; 2 DSQ	NOR; 1; 14	NOR; 2 Ret	NÜR; 1; 11	NÜR; 2; 11	LAU; 1 Ret	LAU; 2 Ret	SAC; 1 Ret	SAC; 2 Ret	RBR; 1; 16	RBR; 2 Ret	HOC; 1; 16	HOC; 2; 20	26th	12

=== Complete Asian Le Mans Series results ===
(key) (Races in bold indicate pole position) (Races in italics indicate fastest lap)

Year	Team	Class	Car	Engine	1	2	3	4	5	6	Pos.	Points
2024–25	Earl Bamber Motorsport	GT	Aston Martin Vantage AMR GT3 Evo	Aston Martin 4.0 L Turbo V8	SEP; 1	SEP; 2	DUB; 2; 20	DUB; 2; 3	ABU; 1; 5	ABU; 2; 2	5th	46
2026–27	Heart of Racing Team	GT	Aston Martin Vantage AMR GT3 Evo	Aston Martin 4.0 L Turbo V8	LEC; 1; 13	LEC; 2; 3	JER; 1	JER; 2	ALG; 1	ALG; 2	6th*	15*

=== Complete IMSA SportsCar Championship results ===
(key) (Races in bold indicate pole position; results in italics indicate fastest lap)

Year	Team	Class	Make	Engine	1	2	3	4	5	6	7	8	9	10	11	Pos.	Points
2025	Heart of Racing Team	GTD	Aston Martin Vantage AMR GT3 Evo	Aston Martin AMR16A 4.0 L Turbo V8	DAY; 3	SEB	LBH	LGA	WGL	MOS	ELK	VIR	IMS	PET		61st	324
2026	Heart of Racing Team	GTD	Aston Martin Vantage AMR GT3 Evo	Aston Martin AMR16A 4.0 L Turbo V8	**DAY**; 3	SEB	LBH	LGA		WGL	MOS	ELK	VIR	IMS		58th	335
2026	Car Blanche	GTD Pro	Aston Martin Vantage AMR GT3 Evo	Aston Martin AMR16A 4.0 L Turbo V8					DET						PET; 1	31st	382

=== Complete FIA World Endurance Championship results ===
(key) (Races in bold indicate pole position; races in italics indicate fastest lap)

Year	Entrant	Class	Chassis	Engine	1	2	3	4	5	6	7	8	Rank	Points
2025	Heart of Racing Team	LMGT3	Aston Martin Vantage AMR GT3 Evo	Aston Martin M177 4.0 L Turbo V8	QAT; 6	IMO; Ret	SPA; 5	**LMS**; 4	SÃO; 14	COA; 5	FUJ; 7	BHR; 3	4th	86
2026	Heart of Racing Team	LMGT3	Aston Martin Vantage AMR GT3 Evo	Aston Martin M177 4.0 L Turbo V8	IMO; Ret	SPA; 2	**LMS**; Ret	SÃO; 13	COA; 1	FUJ; 2	CAT; 15	MNZ; 9	10th	64

=== Complete 24 Hours of Le Mans results ===
Year	Team	Co-Drivers	Car	Class	Laps	Pos.	Class Pos.
2025	(United States) Heart of Racing Team	(United Kingdom) Ian James (Canada) Zacharie Robichon	Aston Martin Vantage AMR GT3 Evo	LMGT3	341	36th	4th
2026	(United States) Heart of Racing Team	(United Kingdom) Ian James (Canada) Zacharie Robichon	Aston Martin Vantage AMR GT3 Evo	LMGT3	291	DNF	DNF

Sporting positions
Preceded by Antonio Fuoco; Giogio Roda; Alessio Rovera	Italian GT Championship; Endurance Cup Champion; 2021; With: Riccardo Agostini & Lorenzo Ferrari	Succeeded by Edoardo Liberati; Yuki Nemoto
Preceded by Dries Vanthoor; Charles Weerts	GT World Challenge Europe Sprint Cup; Champion; 2023; With: Ricardo Feller	Succeeded by Incumbent
