= 2015 Porsche Carrera Cup Italia =

Motor racing competition

2015 Porsche Carrera Cup Italy

Seasons
- ← 2014 2016 →

The 2015 Porsche Carrera Cup Italia season was the ninth Porsche Carrera Cup Italy season. It began on 30 May at Monza and finished on 18 October in Mugello, after seven events with two races at each event, except for the Spa-Francorchamps round. Riccardo Agostini won the drivers' championship driving for Antonelli Motorsport - Centro Porsche Padova, and Tsunami Racing Team won the teams' championship

== Teams and drivers ==
Team	No.	Drivers	Class	Rounds
(Italy) Dinamic Motorsport	3	(Italy) Mattia Drudi	S	All
(Italy) Dinamic Motorsport	33	(Italy) Thomas Biagi		4
(Italy) Dinamic Motorsport	33	(Italy) Alessandro Bonacini		6
(Italy) Dinamic Motorsport	56	(Italy) Niccolò Mercatali	M	1–3, 5, 7
(Italy) Dinamic Motorsport	67	(Italy) Alex de Giacomi	M	All
(Italy) LEM Racing	4	(Finland) Aku Pellinen	S	All
(Italy) LEM Racing	5	(Italy) Stefano Colombo	S	All
(Italy) LEM Racing	6	(China) Dasheng Zhang	S	All
(Italy) LEM Racing	91	(Italy) Walter Ben	M	All
(Italy) Ghinzani Arco Motorsport	9	(Italy) Andrea Fontana	S	1–5
(Italy) Ghinzani Arco Motorsport	9	(Italy) Matteo Torta		6
(Italy) Ghinzani Arco Motorsport	9	(Italy) Kevin Giovesi		7
(Italy) Ghinzani Arco Motorsport	81	(Italy) Marco Cassarà	M	All
(Italy) Antonelli Motorsport - Centro Porsche Torino	11	(Italy) Gianluca Giraudi		All
(Italy) Antonelli Motorsport - Centro Porsche Padova	12	(Italy) Andrea Russo		3, 7
(Italy) Antonelli Motorsport - Centro Porsche Padova	23	(Japan) Takashi Kasai	S	All
(Italy) Antonelli Motorsport - Centro Porsche Padova	25	(Italy) Riccardo Agostini	S	All
(Italy) Antonelli Motorsport - Centro Porsche Padova	45	(Italy) Matteo Desideri		5
(Italy) Antonelli Motorsport - Centro Porsche Padova	58	(Italy) Angelo Proietti	M	1, 5
(Italy) Antonelli Motorsport - Centro Porsche Padova	99	(Italy) Sergio Negroni	M	1–2, 4
(Italy) Antonelli Motorsport - Centro Porsche Padova	99	(Italy) Valentino Fornaroli	M	6–7
(San Marino) Tsunami Racing Team	13	(Ukraine) Oleksandr Gaidai		All
(San Marino) Tsunami Racing Team	22	(France) Côme Ledogar	S	All
(Italy) Heaven Motorsport	17	(Italy) Enrico Fulgenzi		All
(Germany) TAM-Racing	20	(Germany) Christopher Gerhard		2
(Germany) TAM-Racing	44	(Switzerland) Hans-Peter Koller		1–4, 6–7
(Germany) AKF Motorsport	60	(Germany) Oliver Freymuth	M	6–7
(Italy) Ebimotors	65	(Italy) Pietro Negra	M	All
(Italy) Ebimotors	88	(Italy) Alberto de Amicis	M	All
(France) Martinet Team Pro GT	102	(Australia) Nicholas McBride		4
(France) Martinet Team Pro GT	185	(Australia) Nick Foster		4
(France) Martinet Team Pro GT	888	(Norway) Egidio Perfetti		4
(France) Saintéloc Racing	107	(France) Vincent Beltoise		4
(France) Saintéloc Racing	108	(France) Julien Andlauer		4
(France) Sébastien Loeb Racing	109	(France) Joffrey de Narda		4
(France) Sébastien Loeb Racing	911	(France) Christophe Lapierre		4
(Hong Kong) Team Carrera Cup Asia	111	(Singapore) Yuey Tan		4
(Hong Kong) Team Carrera Cup Asia	117	(New Zealand) Chris van der Drift		4
(France) Martinet by Alméras	118	(France) Steven Palette		4
(France) Martinet by Alméras	169	(Switzerland) Daniele Perfetti		4
(France) Racing Technology	133	(Australia) Marc Cini		4
(France) Racing Technology	148	(France) Mathieu Jaminet		4
(France) Racing Technology	244	(France) Sylvain Noël		4
(France) Yvan Muller Racing	136	(Spain) Daniel Díaz		4
(Sweden) Fragus Motorsport	215	(Sweden) Robin Hansson		4
(Belgium) Speed Lover & Allure	220	(Belgium) Pierre Piron		4
(Sweden) MTech Competition	221	(Sweden) Magnus Öhman		4
(Sweden) MTech Competition	255	(Sweden) Lars-Bertil Rantzow		4

Icon	Class
M	Michelin Cup
S	Scholarship Programme

== Race calendar and results ==
Round		Circuit	Date	Pole position	Fastest lap	Winning driver	Winning team
1	R1	(Italy) Autodromo Nazionale Monza, Monza	30 May	(France) Côme Ledogar	(Italy) Riccardo Agostini	(Italy) Riccardo Agostini	(Italy) Antonelli Motorsport - Centro Porsche Padova
1	R2	(Italy) Autodromo Nazionale Monza, Monza	31 May		(Italy) Riccardo Agostini	(Italy) Riccardo Agostini	(Italy) Antonelli Motorsport - Centro Porsche Padova
2	R1	(Italy) Autodromo Enzo e Dino Ferrari, Imola	27 June	(France) Côme Ledogar	(Italy) Stefano Colombo	(France) Côme Ledogar	(San Marino) Tsunami Racing Team
2	R2	(Italy) Autodromo Enzo e Dino Ferrari, Imola	28 June		(France) Côme Ledogar	(Italy) Gianluca Giraudi	(Italy) Antonelli Motorsport - Centro Porsche Torino
3	R1	(Italy) Autodromo Internazionale del Mugello, Scarperia	11 July	(Italy) Riccardo Agostini	(Italy) Riccardo Agostini	(Italy) Riccardo Agostini	(Italy) Antonelli Motorsport - Centro Porsche Padova
3	R2	(Italy) Autodromo Internazionale del Mugello, Scarperia	12 July		(France) Côme Ledogar	(Italy) Riccardo Agostini	(Italy) Antonelli Motorsport - Centro Porsche Padova
4		(Belgium) Spa-Francorchamps, Francorchamps	25 July	(France) Mathieu Jaminet	(France) Steven Palette	(France) Steven Palette	(France) Martinet by Alméras
5	R1	(Italy) ACI Vallelunga Circuit, Campagnano	12 September	(Italy) Riccardo Agostini	(Italy) Riccardo Agostini	(Italy) Riccardo Agostini	(Italy) Antonelli Motorsport - Centro Porsche Padova
5	R2	(Italy) ACI Vallelunga Circuit, Campagnano	13 September		(Italy) Mattia Drudi	(Italy) Mattia Drudi	(Italy) Dinamic Motorsport
6	R1	(Italy) Misano World Circuit Marco Simoncelli, Misano Adriatico	26 September	(France) Côme Ledogar	(France) Côme Ledogar	(Italy) Stefano Colombo	(Italy) LEM Racing
6	R2	(Italy) Misano World Circuit Marco Simoncelli, Misano Adriatico	27 September		(Italy) Stefano Colombo	(France) Côme Ledogar	(San Marino) Tsunami Racing Team
7	R1	(Italy) Autodromo Internazionale del Mugello, Scarperia	17 October	(Italy) Riccardo Agostini	(Italy) Enrico Fulgenzi	(Italy) Enrico Fulgenzi	(Italy) Heaven Motorsport
7	R2	(Italy) Autodromo Internazionale del Mugello, Scarperia	18 October		(France) Côme Ledogar	(France) Côme Ledogar	(San Marino) Tsunami Racing Team

== Championship standings ==
Points system
	**1st**	**2nd**	**3rd**	**4th**	**5th**	**6th**	**7th**	**8th**	**9th**	**10th**	**Pole**	FL
Race 1	20	15	12	10	8	6	4	3	2	1	2	1
Race 2	15	10	8	6	4	3	2	1				1

=== Drivers' Championship ===
Pos	Driver	MNZ (Italy)		IMO (Italy)		MUG (Italy)		SPA^{1} (Belgium)	VAL (Italy)		MIS (Italy)		MUG (Italy)		Pts
1	(Italy) Riccardo Agostini	1	1	2	4	**1**	1	6	**1**	Ret	4	4	**4**	4	183
2	(France) Côme Ledogar	**2**	2	**1**	2	2	14	WD	2	2	**2**	1	3	1	182
3	(Italy) Mattia Drudi	13	4	3	3	4	4	9	3	1	3	2	2	2	145
4	(Italy) Gianluca Giraudi	3	Ret	4	1	3	2	12	7	10	9	10	6	5	99
5	(Italy) Stefano Colombo	7	Ret	14	5	7	5	5^{2}	DNS	DNS	1	3	5	12	92
6	(Italy) Enrico Fulgenzi	Ret	3	Ret	18	6	**Ret**	16	4	5	Ret	20†	1	9	69
7	(Finland) Aku Pellinen	8	8	16†	DNS	8	8	14	6	**4**	5	5	10	21	55
8	(Italy) Alberto de Amicis	5	5	15†	14	5	3	17	11	DSQ	8	8	12	7	54
9	(Italy) Andrea Fontana	4	10	11	7	11	Ret	13	5	3					51
10	(Ukraine) Oleksandr Gaidai	6	**7**	5	8	10	7	11	12	15†	12	19†	8	19†	49
11	(China) Dasheng Zhang	11	6	6	**6**	12	11	20	8	12†	7	7	13	10	41
12	(Italy) Alex de Giacomi	12	14	Ret	12	9	6	24	9	8	10	9	6	**5**	34
13	(Japan) Takashi Kasai	9	Ret	Ret	19	Ret	10	23	10	7	11	12	14	11	25
14	(Italy) Marco Cassarà	15	Ret	7	9	15	9	31	15	Ret	13	14	15	13	24
15	(Italy) Pietro Negra	17	13	8	16	16	12	27	14	9	14	16	Ret	16	23
16	(Switzerland) Hans-Peter Koller	14	16†	9	13	14	13	19			16	15	17	17	22
17	(Italy) Thomas Biagi							15							21
18	(Italy) Sergio Negroni	16	12	12	16			32							20
19	(Italy) Kevin Giovesi												7	3	12
20	(Italy) Alessandro Bonacini										6	6			9
21	(Italy) Niccolò Mercatali	10	9	Ret	11	13	Ret		13	6			16	15	4
22	(Italy) Andrea Russo					17†	Ret						12	8	1
23	(Germany) Christopher Gerhard			10	10										1
	(Italy) Angelo Proietti	Ret	11						18†	11					0
	(Italy) Valentino Fornaroli										15	11	18	14	0
	(Italy) Walter Ben	18	15	13	17	Ret	DNS		16	13	19	18	20	20	0
	(Italy) Matteo Torta										17	13			0
	(Italy) Matteo Desideri								17†	14					0
	(Germany) Oliver Freymuth										18	17	19	18	0
Guest drivers ineligible for points
	(France) Steven Palette							1							0
	(New Zealand) Chris van der Drift							2							0
	(France) Mathieu Jaminet							**3**							0
	(France) Vincent Beltoise							4							0
	(Sweden) Robin Hansson							7							0
	(Australia) Nicholas McBride							8							0
	(Australia) Nick Foster							10							0
	(Sweden) Lars-Bertil Rantzow							18							0
	(France) Julien Andlauer							21							0
	(Belgium) Pierre Piron							22							0
	(Switzerland) Daniele Perfetti							25							0
	(Sweden) Magnus Öhman							26							0
	(Spain) Daniel Díaz							28							0
	(Singapore) Yuey Tan							29							0
	(Australia) Marc Cini							30							0
	(France) Sylvain Noël							33†							0
	(France) Joffrey de Narda							Ret							0
	(France) Christophe Lapierre							Ret							0
	(Norway) Egidio Perfetti							Ret							0
Pos	Driver	MNZ (Italy)		IMO (Italy)		MUG (Italy)		SPA^{1} (Belgium)	VAL (Italy)		MIS (Italy)		MUG (Italy)		Pts

Colour	Result
Gold	Winner
Silver	Second place
Bronze	Third place
Green	Points classification
Blue	Non-points classification
Blue	Non-classified finish (NC)
Purple	Retired, not classified (Ret)
Red	Did not qualify (DNQ)
Red	Did not pre-qualify (DNPQ)
Black	Disqualified (DSQ)
White	Did not start (DNS)
White	Withdrew (WD)
White	Race cancelled (C)
Blank	Did not practice (DNP)
Blank	Did not arrive (DNA)
Blank	Excluded (EX)

**Bold** – Pole
Italics – Fastest Lap

† - Drivers did not finish the race, but were classified as they completed over 75% of the race distance.

- **^1** - the Spa-Francorchamps round assigned 20 points to all the participants, with points per placement assigned on race 2 point system basis.
- **^2** - Stefano Colombo was awarded the points for pole position and for the fastest lap because Mathieu Jaminet and Steven Palette were ineligible to score points.

=== Teams' Championship ===
Pos	Team	MNZ (Italy)		IMO (Italy)		MUG (Italy)		SPA (Belgium)	VAL (Italy)		MIS (Italy)		MUG (Italy)		Pts
1	(San Marino) Tsunami Racing Team	2	2	1	2	2	7	11	2	2	2	1	3	1	160
2	(Italy) Antonelli Motorsport - Centro Porsche Padova	1	1	2	4	1	1	6	1	7	4	4	4	4	155
3	(Italy) Dinamic Motorsport	10	4	3	3	4	4	9	3	1	3	2	2	2	125
4	(Italy) LEM Racing	7	6	6	5	7	5	5	6	4	1	3	5	10	88
5	(Italy) Antonelli Motorsport - Centro Porsche Torino	3	Ret	4	1	3	2	12	7	10	9	10	6	5	79
6	(Italy) Heaven Motorsport	Ret	3	Ret	18	6	Ret	16	4	5	Ret	20†	1	9	48
7	(Italy) Ghinzani Arco Motorsport	4	10	7	7	11	9	13	5	3	13	13	7	3	47
7	(Italy) Ebimotors	5	5	8	14	5	3	17	11	9	8	8	12	7	37
9	(Germany) TAM-Racing	14	16†	9	10	14	13	19			16	15	17	17	2
	(Germany) AKF Motorsport										18	17	19	18	0
Guest teams ineligible for points
	(France) Martinet by Alméras							1							0
	(Hong Kong) Team Carrera Cup Asia							2							0
	(France) Racing Technology							3							0
	(France) Saintéloc Racing							4							0
	(Sweden) Fragus Motorsport							7							0
	(France) Martinet Team Pro GT							8							0
	(Sweden) MTech Competition							18							0
	(Belgium) Speed Lover & Allure							22							0
	(France) Yvan Muller Racing							28							0
	(France) Sébastien Loeb Racing							Ret							0
Pos	Driver	MNZ (Italy)		IMO (Italy)		MUG (Italy)		SPA (Belgium)	VAL (Italy)		MIS (Italy)		MUG (Italy)		Pts

Colour	Result
Gold	Winner
Silver	Second place
Bronze	Third place
Green	Points classification
Blue	Non-points classification
Blue	Non-classified finish (NC)
Purple	Retired, not classified (Ret)
Red	Did not qualify (DNQ)
Red	Did not pre-qualify (DNPQ)
Black	Disqualified (DSQ)
White	Did not start (DNS)
White	Withdrew (WD)
White	Race cancelled (C)
Blank	Did not practice (DNP)
Blank	Did not arrive (DNA)
Blank	Excluded (EX)

**Bold** – Pole
Italics – Fastest Lap

† - Drivers did not finish the race, but were classified as they completed over 90% of the race distance.

=== Michelin Cup ===
The Michelin Cup is the trophy reserved to the gentlemen drivers.

Pos	Driver	Team	Points
1	(Italy) Alberto de Amicis	Ebimotors	103
2	(Italy) Alex de Giacomi	Dinamic	85
3	(Italy) Marco Cassarà	Ghinzani	60
4	(Italy) Pietro Negra	Ebimotors	42
5	(Italy) Niccolò Mercatali	Dinamic	41
6	(Italy) Sergio Negroni	Antonelli - Padova	23
7	(Italy) Valentino Fornaroli	Antonelli - Padova	11
8	(Italy) Angelo Proietti	Antonelli - Padova	7
9	(Italy) Walter Ben	LEM Racing	6
10	(Germany) Oliver Freymuth	AKF Motorsport	3

=== Porsche Carrera Cup Italia Scholarship Programme ===
The Scholarship Programme Cup is the trophy reserved to the under-26 drivers elected by Porsche at the beginning of the season.

Pos	Driver	Team	Points
1	(Italy) Riccardo Agostini	Antonelli - Padova	183
2	(France) Côme Ledogar	Tsunami	182
3	(Italy) Mattia Drudi	Dinamic	145
4	(Italy) Stefano Colombo	LEM Racing	92
5	(Finland) Aku Pellinen	LEM Racing	55
6	(Italy) Andrea Fontana	Ghinzani	51
7	(China) Dasheng Zhang	LEM Racing	41
8	(Japan) Takashi Kasai	Antonelli - Padova	25
