= Côme Ledogar =

French racing driver (born 1991)

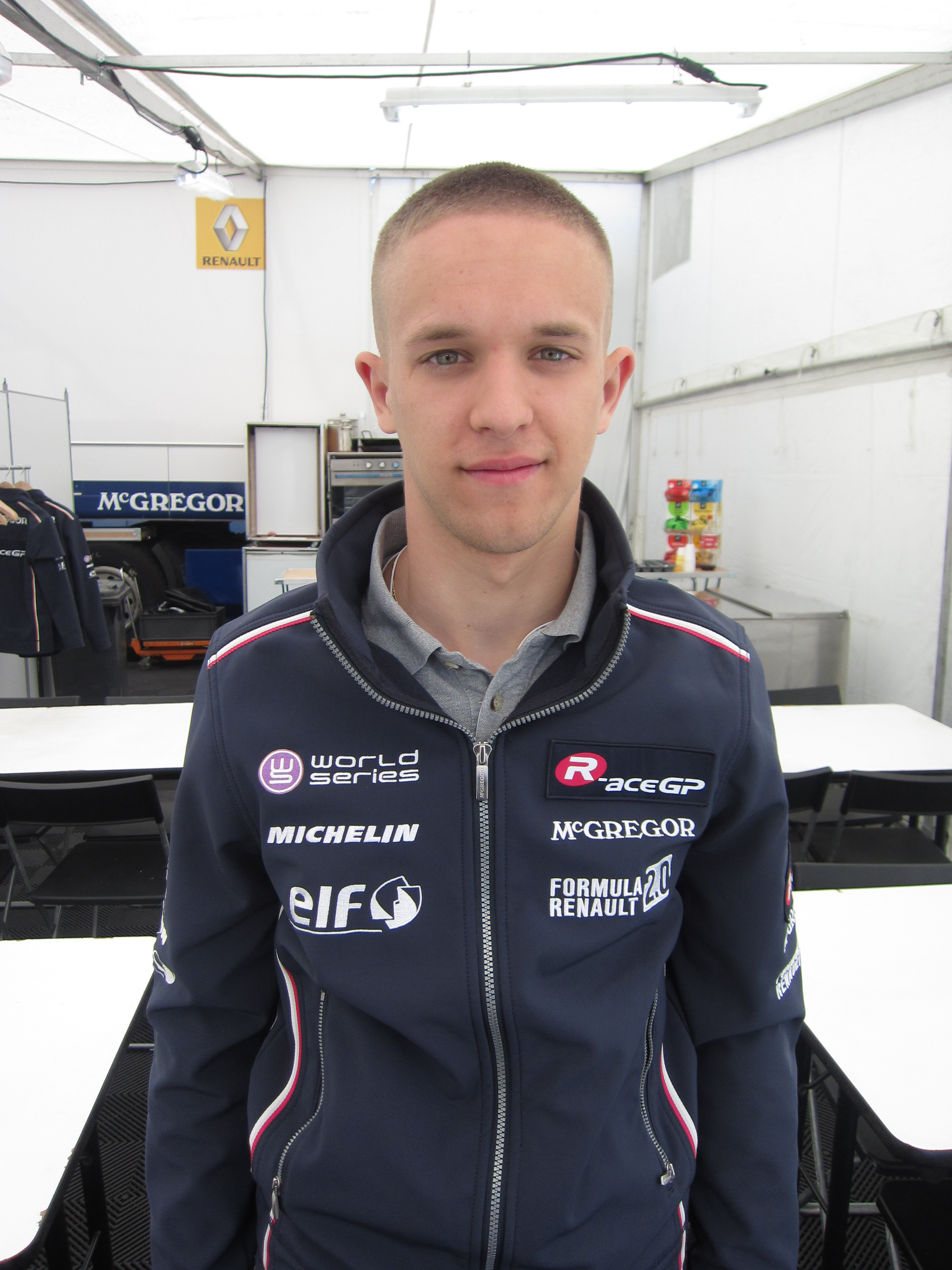
- Ledogar in 2011.
- Nationality: (France) French
- Born: Côme Norbert Ledogar; 23 May 1991 (age 35) Annecy, France

Blancpain GT Series Endurance Cup career
- Debut season: 2013
- Current team: Garage 59
- Categorisation: FIA Gold (until 2016); FIA Platinum (2017–)
- Car number: 58
- Former teams: Strakka Racing
- Starts: 11
- Wins: 2
- Poles: 0
- Fastest laps: 0
- Best finish: 1st in 2016

Previous series
- 2016-17 16-17 2015-16 2014-15 2014 2012-14 2011 2010–11 2009-10 2008 2007: Blancpain GT Series Sprint Cup; International GT Open; Porsche Carrera Cup Italia; Porsche Supercup; Porsche Carrera Cup Germany; Porsche Carrera Cup France; Eurocup Formula Renault 2.0; Formula Renault 2.0 NEC; Formula BMW Europe; Formul'Academy Euro Series; Formula Renault 1.6 Belgium

Championship titles
- 2021 2016 2016 2014: Intercontinental GT Challenge; Porsche Carrera Cup Italia; Blancpain GT Series Endurance Cup; Porsche Carrera Cup France

Côme Norbert Ledogar (born 23 May 1991) is a professional racing driver from France. He is best known for winning the Blancpain GT Series Endurance Cup overall title in 2016, with Robert Bell and Shane van Gisbergen, and for winning the 2021 24 Hours of Spa overall and the 2021 24 Hours of Le Mans in the GTE Pro class.

He owns and operates French racing team Schumacher CLRT.

== Career ==
=== Formula Renault 1.6 ===
Born in Annecy, Ledogar began his racing career in 2007 at the age of 16, making his début in single-seater in the Formula Renault 1.6 Belgium for Thierry Boutsen Energy Racing. For 2008, he joined Formul'Academy Euro Series, which used the same Formula Renault 1.6 cars. He won four from fourteen races and had another two podium finishes, losing the title to Arthur Pic.

=== Formula BMW ===
In 2009, Ledogar moved to the Formula BMW Europe, joining DAMS team. He finished nine from sixteen races in points to finish season 17th. For the next year, he switched to Eifelland Racing. He had three podium finishes, improving to the sixth in the standings.

=== Formula Renault 2.0 ===
In 2011, Ledogar switched to the Eurocup Formula Renault 2.0, with the R-ace GP. He ended season 19th with three point-scoring finishes. He also had a part-time campaign in Formula Renault 2.0 Northern European Cup with the same team, achieving podium finish at Zandvoort.

=== Sports car racing ===
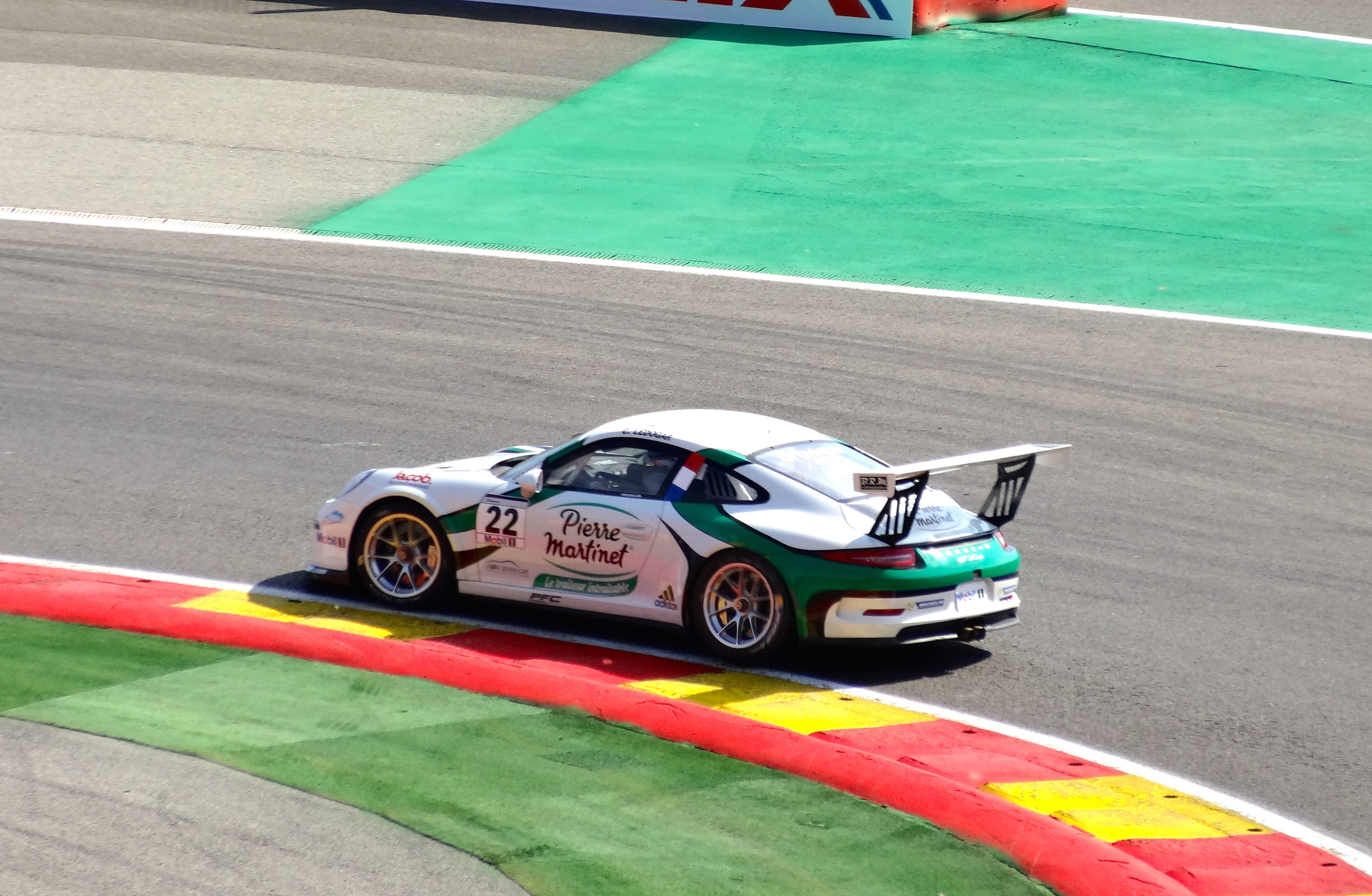
Côme Ledogar on Porsche Supercup, Spa Francochamps in 2015.

In 2012, Ledogar decided to switch to sports car racing, joining Pro GT by Alméras in the Porsche Carrera Cup France. He won four from fourteen races but lost 22 points in the championship battle to Jean-Karl Vernay. He remained in the Cup for 2013, switching to Sébastien Loeb Racing, but wasn't able to improve his position in the standings, winning only two races. For 2014, he returned to Alméras team, finally winning the series, with four-point margin over Maxime Jousse after six race wins and another two podium finishes.

For 2015, Ledogar had a double campaign in both Porsche Supercup and Carrera Cup Italia. He was victorious in the Italian series at Monza, Imola, Misano and Mugello and had another seven podiums on his way to the runner-up place behind Riccardo Agostini. While in the Supercup he was eight in the standings, and the second-best season rookie with a podium at Hungaroring.

In 2016, Ledogar continued to race in the Carrera Cup Italia. He amassed Mattia Drudi by 19 points in the championship battle and had six race wins with eight another podium finishes. Also he became a McLaren factory driver. He competed behind the wheel of McLaren 650S GT3 in the 2016 International GT Open and 2016 Blancpain GT Series with Garage 59 team. He won Monza GT Open race, but as he wasn't on the full schedule he finished only eleventh in the standings, while in the 2016 Blancpain GT Series Endurance Cup, which was part of the Blancpain GT Series, he became champion with Robert Bell and Shane van Gisbergen.

For 2017, Ledogar was more concentrated on GT Open, staying with Garage 59, pairing with Alexander West. He finished third in the Pro-Am standings. While in the 2017 Blancpain GT Series he joined Strakka Racing. But he finished only 69th, with just two points, which was scored on the opening round of the 2017 Blancpain GT Series Endurance Cup.

In 2018, Ledogar rejoined Garage 59 squad in the Blancpain GT Series Endurance Cup, becoming teammate of Ben Barnicoat and Andrew Watson.

In 2019, Ledogar left McLaren and joined Garage 59 to drive an Aston Martin Vantage at the Blancpain GT Series Endurance Cup together with Jonny Adam and Andrew Watson, and at two additional rounds of the Intercontinental GT Challenge with Chris Goodwin and Alexander West. Also he drove a Ferrari 488 at the 24 Hours of Le Mans with Car Guy Racing.

Ledogar drove for Garage 59 at the 2020 Bathurst 12 Hour, and entered three rounds of the 2019–20 Asian Le Mans Series with Car Guy Racing, scoring a win at The Bend.

After the COVID-19 pandemic's first lockdown, Ledogar entered the Silverstone round of the 2020 Porsche Supercup. He then drove a Ferrari 488 at the 24 Hours of Le Mans and at the Paul Ricard round of the GT World Challenge Europe Endurance Cup with AF Corse, winning the latter with Tom Blomqvist and Alessandro Pier Guidi.

In 2021, Car Guy Racing hired Ledogar for the Asian Le Mans Series, winning the final race. He joined Iron Lynx for the GT World Challenge Europe Endurance Cup, partnering with Pier Guidi and Nicklas Nielsen. The trio won the 2021 24 Hours of Spa. In addition, AF Corse hired him as third driver for the 24 Hours of Le Mans, claiming the win at the GTE Pro class.

== Racing record ==
=== Career summary ===
Season	Series	Team	Races	Wins	Poles	F/Laps	Podiums	Points	Position
2007	Formula Renault 1.6 Belgium	Boutsen Energy Racing	2	0	0	0	0	0	NC
2008	Formul'Academy Euro Series	Auto Sport Academy	14	4	3	5	6	120.5	**2nd**
2009	Formula BMW Europe	DAMS	16	0	0	0	0	49	17th
2010	Formula BMW Europe	Eifelland Racing	16	0	2	0	3	187	6th
2010	Formula Renault 2.0 NEC	Josef Kaufmann Racing	5	0	0	0	1	59	16th
2011	Eurocup Formula Renault 2.0	R-ace GP	14	0	0	1	0	9	19th
2011	Formula Renault 2.0 NEC	R-ace GP	9	0	0	0	1	91	19th
2012	Porsche Carrera Cup France	Pro GT by Alméras	14	4	2	5	9	231	**2nd**
2013	Porsche Carrera Cup France	Sébastien Loeb Racing	11	2	2	1	2	118	5th
2013	Blancpain Endurance Series - Pro-Am	Hexis Racing	1	0	0	0	0	0	NC
2014	Porsche Carrera Cup France	Team Martinet - Alméras	12	6	6	2	8	188	**1st**
2014	Porsche Carrera Cup Germany	Land Motorsport	6	0	0	0	0	11	25th
2014	Porsche Supercup	Pro GT by Alméras	1	0	0	0	0	0	NC†
2015	Porsche Carrera Cup Italia	Tsunami RT	12	4	3	4	11	182	**2nd**
2015	Porsche Supercup	Pro GT by Alméras	10	0	0	0	1	81	8th
2016	Porsche Carrera Cup Italia	Tsunami RT	18	6	8	11	14	182	**1st**
2016	24H Series - 991	Tsunami RT							
2016	Blancpain GT Series	Garage 59	11	2	2	0	0	68	12th
2016	Blancpain GT Series Endurance Cup	Garage 59	5	2	0	0	2	68	**1st**
2016	Blancpain GT Series Sprint Cup	Garage 59	6	0	0	0	0	0	NC
2016	International GT Open	Garage 59	10	0	0	0	1	81	8th
2016	Intercontinental GT Challenge	Garage 59	1	0	0	0	0	17	10th
2016	Intercontinental GT Challenge	K-Pax Racing	1	0	1	0	1	17	10th
2017	International GT Open - Pro-Am	Garage 59	14	2	2	3	6	60	**3rd**
2017	Blancpain GT Series	Strakka Racing	8	0	0	0	0	2	69th
2017	Blancpain GT Series Endurance Cup	Strakka Racing	4	0	0	0	0	2	44th
2017	Blancpain GT Series Sprint Cup	Strakka Racing	4	0	0	1	0	0	NC
2017	Intercontinental GT Challenge	Tekno Autosports/McLaren GT	1	0	0	0	0	12	10th
2017	Intercontinental GT Challenge	Strakka Racing	1	0	0	0	0	12	10th
2017	Australian GT Championship	Tekno Autosports	3	0	0	0	1	66	30th
2018	Blancpain GT Series Endurance Cup	Garage 59	5	0	0	0	1	19	24th
2018	Intercontinental GT Challenge	YNA Autosport	1	0	0	0	0	6	22nd
2018	Intercontinental GT Challenge	Garage 59	2	0	0	0	0	6	22nd
2018	WeatherTech SportsCar Championship - GTD	Meyer Shank Racing with Curb-Agajanian	1	0	0	0	0	20	56th
2018	24H GT Series - SPX	Tsunami RT							
2018	24 Hours of Le Mans - LMP2	Jackie Chan DC Racing	1	0	0	0	0	N/A	DNF
2018–19	Asian Le Mans Series - LMP2	Spirit of Race	3	1	2	0	1	35	7th
2019	Blancpain GT Series Endurance Cup	Garage 59	5	0	0	0	0	2	33rd
2019	Porsche Carrera Cup France	Team 85 Bourgoin Racing	12	1	1	2	5	178	4th
2019	24 Hours of Le Mans - LMGTE Am	Car Guy Racing	1	0	0	0	0	N/A	6th
2019–20	Asian Le Mans Series - GT	Car Guy Racing	3	1	1	0	2	54	6th
2020	GT World Challenge Europe Endurance Cup	AF Corse	1	1	0	0	1	33	10th
2020	Intercontinental GT Challenge	Garage 59	1	0	0	0	0	0	NC
2020	Porsche Supercup	CLRT	1	0	0	0	0	0	NC†
2020	24 Hours of Le Mans - LMGTE Am	Luzich Racing	1	0	1	0	0	N/A	7th
2021	FIA World Endurance Championship - LMGTE Pro	AF Corse	1	1	0	0	1	50	8th
2021	24 Hours of Le Mans - LMGTE Pro	AF Corse	1	1	0	0	1	N/A	**1st**
2021	European Le Mans Series - LMGTE	AF Corse	1	0	0	0	0	0	NC†
2021	Asian Le Mans Series - GT	Car Guy Racing	4	1	0	0	1	31.5	6th
2021	GT World Challenge Europe Endurance Cup	Iron Lynx	5	1	0	0	1	83	**1st**
2021	Intercontinental GT Challenge	Iron Lynx Motorsports Lab	1	1	0	0	1	55	**1st**
2021	Intercontinental GT Challenge	AF Corse - Francorchamps Motors	2	0	1	1	1	55	**1st**
2022	GT World Challenge Europe Endurance Cup	Dinamic Motorsport	3	0	0	0	0	14	22nd
2022	24 Hours of Nürburgring - SP9	Dinamic Motorsport	1	0	0	0	0	N/A	DNF
2022	24 Hours of Le Mans - LMGTE Am	Inception Racing	1	0	0	0	0	N/A	DNF
2023	24 Hours of Nürburgring - SP9	Huber Motorsport	1	0	0	0	0	N/A	DNF
2024	Nürburgring Langstrecken-Serie - SP-X	Glickenhaus Racing LLC							
2024	24 Hours of Nürburgring - SPX	Glickenhaus Racing LLC							

^{*} Season still in progress.

† Guest driver ineligible to score points

=== Complete Formula Renault 2.0 NEC results ===
(key) (Races in bold indicate pole position) (Races in italics indicate fastest lap)

Year	Entrant	1	2	3	4	5	6	7	8	9	10	11	12	13	14	15	16	17	18	19	20	DC	Points
2010	Josef Kaufmann Racing	HOC; 1	HOC; 2	BRN; 1	BRN; 2	ZAN; 1	ZAN; 2	OSC; 1	OSC; 2	OSC; 3	ASS; 1	ASS; 2	MST; 1	MST; 2	MST; 3	SPA; 1; 10	SPA; 2 Ret	SPA; 3; 9	NÜR; 1; 7	NÜR; 2; 3	NÜR; 3 C	16th	59
2011	R-ace GP	HOC; 1 Ret	HOC; 2; 11	HOC; 3; 19	SPA; 1 Ret	SPA; 2; 10	NÜR; 1; 7	NÜR; 2; 6	ASS; 1	ASS; 2	ASS; 3	OSC; 1	OSC; 2	ZAN; 1; 8	ZAN; 2; 3	MST; 1	MST; 2	MST; 3	MNZ; 1	MNZ; 2	MNZ; 3	19th	91

=== Complete Eurocup Formula Renault 2.0 results ===
(key) (Races in bold indicate pole position; races in italics indicate fastest lap)

Year	Entrant	1	2	3	4	5	6	7	8	9	10	11	12	13	14	DC	Points
2011	R-ace GP	ALC; 1; 17	ALC; 2; 7	SPA; 1 Ret	SPA; 2; 10	NÜR; 1; 11	NÜR; 2 Ret	HUN; 1; 9	HUN; 2; 22	SIL; 1; 18	SIL; 2; 21	LEC; 1; 13	LEC; 2; 18	CAT; 1 Ret	CAT; 2; 12	19th	9

=== Complete GT World Challenge Europe results ===
==== GT World Challenge Europe Endurance Cup ====
(key) (Races in bold indicate pole position) (Races in italics indicate fastest lap)

Year	Team	Car	Class	1	2	3	4	5	6	7	Pos.	Points
2013	Hexis Racing	McLaren MP4-12C GT3	Pro-Am	MNZ	SIL	LEC	SPA; 6H; 34	SPA; 12H; 28	SPA; 24H; Ret	NÜR	NC	0
2016	Garage 59	McLaren 650S GT3	Pro	MNZ; 1	SIL; 6	LEC; 1	SPA; 6H; 8	SPA; 12H; 39	SPA; 24H; 31	NÜR; 30	1st	68
2017	Strakka Racing	McLaren 650S GT3	Pro	MNZ; 9	SIL; 34	LEC; Ret	SPA; 6H; 60	SPA; 12H; 60	SPA; 24H; Ret	CAT	28th	2
2018	Garage 59	McLaren 650S GT3	Pro	MNZ; 15	SIL; 15	LEC; 3	SPA; 6H; 41	SPA; 12H; 28	SPA; 24H; 22	CAT; 26	24th	19
2019	Garage 59	Aston Martin Vantage AMR GT3	Pro	MNZ; 9	SIL; Ret	LEC; Ret	SPA; 6H; 71	SPA; 12H; 71	SPA; 24H; Ret	CAT; Ret	33rd	2
2020	AF Corse	Ferrari 488 GT3	Pro	IMO	NÜR	SPA; 6H	SPA; 12H	SPA; 24H	LEC; 1		10th	33
2021	Iron Lynx	Ferrari 488 GT3 Evo 2020	Pro	MNZ; 5	LEC; 5	SPA; 6H; 1	SPA; 12H; 1	SPA; 24H; 1	NÜR; 7	CAT; 7	1st	83
2022	Dinamic Motorsport	Porsche 911 GT3 R	Pro	IMO; 6	LEC; Ret	SPA; 6H; 6	SPA; 12H; Ret	SPA; 24H; Ret	HOC	CAT	22nd	14

==== GT World Challenge Europe Sprint Cup ====
(key) (Races in bold indicate pole position) (Races in italics indicate fastest lap)

Year	Team	Car	Class	1	2	3	4	5	6	7	8	9	10	Pos.	Points
2016	Garage 59	McLaren 650S GT3	Pro	MIS; QR	MIS; CR	BRH; QR; 32	BRH; CR; 25	NÜR; QR; Ret	NÜR; CR; Ret	HUN; QR; 23	HUN; CR; Ret	CAT; QR	CAT; CR	NC	0
2017	Strakka Racing	McLaren 650S GT3	Pro	MIS; QR	MIS; CR	BRH; QR	BRH; CR	ZOL; QR; Ret	ZOL; CR; Ret	HUN; QR	HUN; CR	NÜR; QR; Ret	NÜR; CR; 25	NC	0

=== Complete 24 Hours of Le Mans results ===
Year	Team	Co-Drivers	Car	Class	Laps	Pos.	Class Pos.
2018	(China) Jackie Chan DC Racing	(United States) Ricky Taylor (Denmark) David Heinemeier Hansson	Ligier JS P217-Gibson	LMP2	195	DNF	DNF
2019	(Japan) Car Guy Racing	(Japan) Takeshi Kimura (Italy) Kei Cozzolino	Ferrari 488 GTE	GTE; Am	332	35th	5th
2020	(Switzerland) Luzich Racing	(Brazil) Oswaldo Negri Jr. (Puerto Rico) Francesco Piovanetti	Ferrari 488 GTE Evo	GTE; Am	335	32nd	7th
2021	(Italy) AF Corse	(United Kingdom) James Calado (Italy) Alessandro Pier Guidi	Ferrari 488 GTE Evo	GTE; Pro	345	20th	**1st**
2022	(United Kingdom) Inception Racing	(France) Marvin Klein (Sweden) Alexander West	Ferrari 488 GTE Evo	GTE; Am	190	DNF	DNF

Sporting positions
Preceded by Alex Buncombe; Katsumasa Chiyo; Wolfgang Reip	Blancpain GT Series Endurance Cup; Champion; 2016; With: Rob Bell and Shane van Gisbergen	Succeeded by Mirko Bortolotti; Andrea Caldarelli; Christian Engelhart
Preceded by Riccardo Agostini	Porsche Carrera Cup Italy; Champion; 2016	Succeeded by Alessio Rovera
Preceded by Nicky Catsburg; Augusto Farfus	Intercontinental GT Challenge; Champion; 2021–22; With: Alessandro Pier Guidi	Succeeded by Daniel Juncadella
