= 2016 Porsche Carrera Cup Italia =

Motor racing competition

2016 Porsche Carrera Cup Italy

Seasons
- ← 2015 2017 →

The 2016 Porsche Carrera Cup Italia season was the tenth Porsche Carrera Cup Italy season. It began on 30 April at Monza and finished on 16 October in Mugello, after seven events with three races at each event.

== Teams and drivers ==
Team	No.	Drivers	Class	Rounds
(Italy) Dinamic Motorsport	3	(Italy) Mattia Drudi	S	1
(Italy) Dinamic Motorsport	25	(Italy) Daniele di Amato	S	1
(Italy) Dinamic Motorsport	28	(Italy) Eric Scalvini	S	1
(Italy) Dinamic Motorsport	67	(Italy) Alex de Giacomi	M	1
(Italy) Dinamic Motorsport	76	(Italy) Marco Pellegrini	M	1
(Italy) Dinamic Motorsport	77	(Italy) Stefano Zanini	M	1
(Italy) Dinamic Motorsport	91	(Italy) Walter Ben	M	1
(Italy) Ghinzani Arco Motorsport	7	(Italy) Kevin Giovesi	S	1
(Italy) Ghinzani Arco Motorsport	7	(Italy) Simone Iaquinta	S	1
(Italy) Ghinzani Arco Motorsport	32	(Italy) Gianmarco Quaresmini		1
(Italy) Ghinzani Arco Motorsport	50	(Italy) Glauco Solieri	M	1
(Italy) Ghinzani Arco Motorsport	81	(Italy) Marco Cassarà	M	1
(Italy) Ebimotors	12	(Italy) Alessio Rovera	S	1
(Italy) Ebimotors	16	(Italy) Matteo Cairoli		1
(San Marino) Tsunami Racing Team	13	(France) Côme Ledogar		1
(San Marino) Tsunami Racing Team	13	(Ukraine) Oleksandr Gaidai		1
(San Marino) Tsunami Racing Team	33	(Canada) Mikaël Grenier	S	1
(San Marino) Tsunami Racing Team	33	(Italy) Matteo Torta		1
(Germany) TAM-Racing	17	(Italy) Enrico Fulgenzi		1
(Germany) TAM-Racing	44	(Switzerland) Hans-Peter Koller		1

Icon	Class
M	Michelin Cup
S	Scholarship Programme

== Race calendar and results ==
Starting from 2016, each round includes three races: two sprints on Saturday and an endurance on Sunday. Each one of the sprint races' starting grid is defined by a qualifying session; for the endurance race, the starting grid is determined by the summation of the best laps of each qualifying session.

Round		Circuit	Date	Pole position	Fastest lap	Winning driver	Winning team
1	R1	(Italy) Autodromo Nazionale Monza, Monza	30 April	(Italy) Matteo Cairoli	(Italy) Matteo Cairoli	(Italy) Matteo Cairoli	(Italy) Ebimotors
1	R2	(Italy) Autodromo Nazionale Monza, Monza	30 April	(Italy) Matteo Cairoli	(Italy) Matteo Cairoli	(Italy) Matteo Cairoli	(Italy) Ebimotors
1	R3	(Italy) Autodromo Nazionale Monza, Monza	1 May	(Italy) Matteo Cairoli	(Italy) Matteo Cairoli	(Italy) Matteo Cairoli	(Italy) Ebimotors
2	R1	(Italy) Autodromo Enzo e Dino Ferrari, Imola	28 May	(France) Côme Ledogar	(Italy) Mattia Drudi	(France) Côme Ledogar	(San Marino) Tsunami Racing Team
2	R2	(Italy) Autodromo Enzo e Dino Ferrari, Imola	28 May	(Italy) Gianluca Giraudi	(Italy) Gianluca Giraudi	(Italy) Mattia Drudi	(Italy) Dinamic Motorsport
2	R3	(Italy) Autodromo Enzo e Dino Ferrari, Imola	29 May	(France) Côme Ledogar	(Italy) Mattia Drudi	(France) Côme Ledogar	(San Marino) Tsunami Racing Team
3	R1	(Italy) Misano World Circuit Marco Simoncelli, Misano Adriatico	11 June	(Italy) Mattia Drudi	(Italy) Mattia Drudi	(Italy) Mattia Drudi	(Italy) Dinamic Motorsport
3	R2	(Italy) Misano World Circuit Marco Simoncelli, Misano Adriatico	11 June	(Italy) Mattia Drudi	(Italy) Mattia Drudi	(Italy) Mattia Drudi	(Italy) Dinamic Motorsport
3	R3	(Italy) Misano World Circuit Marco Simoncelli, Misano Adriatico	12 June	(Italy) Mattia Drudi	(France) Côme Ledogar	(Italy) Mattia Drudi	(Italy) Dinamic Motorsport
4	R1	(Italy) Autodromo Internazionale del Mugello, Scarperia	16 July	(France) Côme Ledogar	(France) Côme Ledogar	(France) Côme Ledogar	(San Marino) Tsunami Racing Team
4	R2	(Italy) Autodromo Internazionale del Mugello, Scarperia	16 July	(France) Côme Ledogar	(France) Côme Ledogar	(France) Côme Ledogar	(San Marino) Tsunami Racing Team
4	R3	(Italy) Autodromo Internazionale del Mugello, Scarperia	17 July	(France) Côme Ledogar	(Italy) Mattia Drudi	(France) Côme Ledogar	(San Marino) Tsunami Racing Team
5	R1	(Italy) ACI Vallelunga Circuit, Campagnano	10 September	(France) Côme Ledogar	(France) Côme Ledogar	(France) Côme Ledogar	(San Marino) Tsunami Racing Team
5	R2	(Italy) ACI Vallelunga Circuit, Campagnano	10 September	(France) Côme Ledogar	(France) Côme Ledogar	(France) Côme Ledogar	(San Marino) Tsunami Racing Team
5	R3	(Italy) ACI Vallelunga Circuit, Campagnano	11 September	(France) Côme Ledogar	(France) Côme Ledogar	(Italy) Mattia Drudi	(Italy) Dinamic Motorsport
6	R1	(Italy) Autodromo Enzo e Dino Ferrari, Imola	24 September	(Italy) Mattia Drudi	(Italy) Mattia Drudi	(Italy) Mattia Drudi	(Italy) Dinamic Motorsport
6	R2	(Italy) Autodromo Enzo e Dino Ferrari, Imola	24 September	(France) Côme Ledogar	(France) Côme Ledogar	(Italy) Mattia Drudi	(Italy) Dinamic Motorsport
6	R3	(Italy) Autodromo Enzo e Dino Ferrari, Imola	25 September	(Italy) Mattia Drudi	(France) Côme Ledogar	(Italy) Alessio Rovera	(Italy) Ebimotors
7	R1	(Italy) Autodromo Internazionale del Mugello, Scarperia	15 October				
7	R2	(Italy) Autodromo Internazionale del Mugello, Scarperia	15 October				
7	R3	(Italy) Autodromo Internazionale del Mugello, Scarperia	16 October				

== Championship standings ==
Points system
	**1st**	**2nd**	**3rd**	**4th**	**5th**	**6th**	**7th**	**8th**	**9th**	**10th**	**11th**	**12th**	**13th**	**14th**	**15th**	**Pole**	FL
Sprint	15	12	10	8	6	5	4	3	2	1						1	1
Endurance	25	22	20	18	16	14	12	10	8	6	5	4	3	2	1		1

=== Drivers' Championship ===
Only the best Sprint Race for each weekend counts towards the championship.

Pos	Driver	MNZ (Italy)			IMO (Italy)	MIS (Italy)	MUG (Italy)	VAL (Italy)	IMO (Italy)	MUG (Italy)	Pts
1	(Italy) Matteo Cairoli	**1**	(**1**)	**1**							43
2	(Italy) Mattia Drudi	Ret	2	2							34
3	(Italy) Alessio Rovera	4	(5)	3							28
4	(France) Côme Ledogar	2		5							28
5	(Italy) Eric Scalvini	3	(4)	6							24
6	(Italy) Daniele di Amato	Ret	6	4							23
7	(Ukraine) Oleksandr Gaidai		7	5							20
9	(Canada) Mikaël Grenier		3	9							18
9	(Italy) Glauco Solieri	7	(9)	7							16
10	(Italy) Marco Cassarà	6	11	8							15
11	(Italy) Matteo Torta	12		9							8
12	(Italy) Stefano Zanini	8	14	11							8
13	(Italy) Gianmarco Quaresmini	9	(10)	12							6
14	(Switzerland) Hans-Peter Koller	11	13	10							6
15	(Italy) Enrico Fulgenzi	5	16†	Ret							6
16	(Italy) Alex de Giacomi	(10)	8	Ret							3
17	(Italy) Marco Pellegrini	Ret	12	13							3
18	(Italy) Walter Ben	13	15	14							2
	(Italy) Kevin Giovesi		17†	Ret							0
	(Italy) Simone Iaquinta	DSQ		Ret							0
Pos	Driver	MNZ (Italy)			IMO (Italy)	MIS (Italy)	MUG (Italy)	VAL (Italy)	IMO (Italy)	MUG (Italy)	Pts

Colour	Result
Gold	Winner
Silver	Second place
Bronze	Third place
Green	Points classification
Blue	Non-points classification
Blue	Non-classified finish (NC)
Purple	Retired, not classified (Ret)
Red	Did not qualify (DNQ)
Red	Did not pre-qualify (DNPQ)
Black	Disqualified (DSQ)
White	Did not start (DNS)
White	Withdrew (WD)
White	Race cancelled (C)
Blank	Did not practice (DNP)
Blank	Did not arrive (DNA)
Blank	Excluded (EX)

**Bold** – Pole
Italics – Fastest Lap

† - Drivers did not finish the race, but were classified as they completed over 90% of the race distance.

=== Teams' Championship ===
Pos	Team	MNZ (Italy)			IMO (Italy)	MIS (Italy)	MUG (Italy)	VAL (Italy)	IMO (Italy)	MUG (Italy)	Pts
1	(Italy) Ebimotors	1	1	1							55
2	(Italy) Dinamic Motorsport 1	3	2	2							44
3	(San Marino) Tsunami Racing Team	2	3	5							38
4	(Italy) Ghinzani Arco Motorsport	6	9	7							17,5
5	(Germany) TAM-Racing	5	13	10							12
6	(Italy) Dinamic Motorsport 2	8	12	11							8
Pos	Team	MNZ (Italy)			IMO (Italy)	MIS (Italy)	MUG (Italy)	VAL (Italy)	IMO (Italy)	MUG (Italy)	Pts

Colour	Result
Gold	Winner
Silver	Second place
Bronze	Third place
Green	Points classification
Blue	Non-points classification
Blue	Non-classified finish (NC)
Purple	Retired, not classified (Ret)
Red	Did not qualify (DNQ)
Red	Did not pre-qualify (DNPQ)
Black	Disqualified (DSQ)
White	Did not start (DNS)
White	Withdrew (WD)
White	Race cancelled (C)
Blank	Did not practice (DNP)
Blank	Did not arrive (DNA)
Blank	Excluded (EX)

**Bold** – Pole
Italics – Fastest Lap

† - Drivers did not finish the race, but were classified as they completed over 90% of the race distance.

=== Michelin Cup ===
The Michelin Cup is the trophy reserved to the gentlemen drivers.

Pos	Driver	Team	Points
1	(Italy) Glauco Solieri	Ghinzani	23
2	(Italy) Marco Cassarà	Ghinzani	22
3	(Italy) Stefano Zanini	Dinamic 2	16
4	(Italy) Marco Pellegrini	Dinamic 2	42
5	(Italy) Alex de Giacomi	Dinamic 1	10
6	(Italy) Walter Ben	Dinamic 2	10

=== Porsche Carrera Cup Italia Scholarship Programme ===
The Scholarship Programme Cup is the trophy reserved to the under-26 drivers elected by Porsche at the beginning of the season.

Pos	Driver	Team	Points
1	(Italy) Mattia Drudi	Dinamic 1	34
2	(Italy) Alessio Rovera	Ebimotors	28
3	(Italy) Eric Scalvini	Dinamic 1	24
4	(Italy) Daniele di Amato	Dinamic 1	23
5	(Canada) Mikaël Grenier	Tsunami	18
	(Italy) Kevin Giovesi	Ghinzani	0
	(Italy) Simone Iaquinta	Ghinzani	0
