= 2008 Formul'Academy Euro Series =

Motor racing competition

2008 Formul'Academy Euro Series season

Seasons
- ← 2007 2009 →

The 2008 Formul'Academy Euro Series season was the sixteenth season of the series for 1600cc Formula Renault machinery, and the first under the Formul'Academy Euro Series guise.

It replaced the FFSA Formule Campus Renault Elf, and was managed by the Auto Sport Academy. The series used Signatech chassis powered by Renault K4MRS 1600cc engines. Rounds were contested in France, Belgium, Czech Republic and United Kingdom at 7 venues.

== Driver lineup ==
No	Driver	Rounds
1	(United Kingdom) Ashley Babbra	All
2	(France) Romain Vozniak	All
3	(France) Michaël Denis	All
4	(France) David Assaad	All
5	(France) Mathieu Maurage	All
6	(France) Hugo Valente	All
7	(France) Vincent Beltoise	All
8	(France) Maxime Pialat	All
9	(France) Kévin Bole Besançon	1-6
10	(France) Marc-Antoine Dannielou	All
11	(France) Arthur Pic	All
12	(France) Arno Santamato	All
13	(France) Côme Ledogar	All
14	(Canada) Elie Arseneau	All
15	(France) Mike Courquin	All
16	(Spain) Jordi Cunill	1-3, 5-7
17	(France) Carole Perrin	1-4, 6
18	(France) Boris Bouvier	1-6
19	(France) Gary Chalandon	1-6
20	(France) Clément Sudre	1-6
21	(Spain) Javier Tarancon	All
22	(United Arab Emirates) Saeed Al Mehairi	All
23	(United Arab Emirates) Mohammed Al Awadi	All
24	(United Arab Emirates) Mohamed Al Mutawaa	All
25	(France) Benjamin Beauclair	3
25	(Belgium) Eliott Bachelart	4
25	(France) Wilson Philippe	7

== Race calendar and results ==
Round		Circuit	Date	Pole position	Fastest lap	Winning driver
1	R1	(France) Circuit de Lédenon, Lédenon	26 April	(France) Arno Santomato	(France) Arthur Pic	(France) Mike Courquin
1	R2	(France) Circuit de Lédenon, Lédenon	27 April	(France) Arthur Pic	(France) Arthur Pic	(France) Arthur Pic
2	R1	(France) Circuit de Pau-Ville, Pau	1 June	(France) Arno Santomato	(France) Arthur Pic	(United Kingdom) Ashley Babbra
2	R2	(France) Circuit de Pau-Ville, Pau	2 June	(France) Arthur Pic	(France) Arthur Pic	(France) Arno Santamato
3	R1	(France) Circuit de Nevers Magny-Cours	21 June	(France) Arthur Pic	(France) Arthur Pic	(France) Arthur Pic
3	R2	(France) Circuit de Nevers Magny-Cours	22 June	(France) Côme Ledogar	(France) Côme Ledogar	(France) Côme Ledogar
4	R1	(Belgium) Circuit de Spa-Francorchamps, Spa	1 August	(France) Arthur Pic	(France) Arthur Pic	(France) Arthur Pic
4	R2	(Belgium) Circuit de Spa-Francorchamps, Spa	2 August	(France) Arthur Pic	(France) Côme Ledogar	(France) Arthur Pic
5	R1	(Czech Republic) Brno Circuit	13 September	(France) Côme Ledogar	(France) Mike Courquin	(France) Arthur Pic
5	R2	(Czech Republic) Brno Circuit	14 September	(France) Vincent Beltoise	(United Kingdom) Ashley Babbra	(France) Arthur Pic
6	R1	(France) Bugatti Circuit, Le Mans	4 October	(France) Arthur Pic	(France) Côme Ledogar	(France) Côme Ledogar
6	R2	(France) Bugatti Circuit, Le Mans	5 October	(France) Côme Ledogar	(France) Vincent Beltoise	(France) Hugo Valente
7	R1	(United Kingdom) Snetterton Circuit, Norfolk	1 November	(France) Mike Courquin	(France) Côme Ledogar	(France) Côme Ledogar
7	R2	(United Kingdom) Snetterton Circuit, Norfolk	2 November	(United Kingdom) Ashley Babbra	(France) Côme Ledogar	(France) Côme Ledogar

== Championship standings ==
=== Drivers ===
- Only a driver's best twelve results counted towards the championship. Points were awarded to the drivers as follows:

Position	1	2	3	4	5	6	7	8	9	10	PP	FL
Points	15	12	10	8	6	5	4	3	2	1	1	1

Pos	Driver	LED 1 (France)	LED 2 (France)	PAU 1 (France)	PAU 2 (France)	MAG 1 (France)	MAG 2 (France)	SPA 1 (Belgium)	SPA 2 (Belgium)	BRN 1 (Czech Republic)	BRN 2 (Czech Republic)	LEM 1 (France)	LEM 2 (France)	NOR 1 (United Kingdom)	NOR 2 (United Kingdom)	Total
1	(France) Arthur Pic	6	**1**	7	**2**	**1**	Ret	**1**	**1**	1	1	**3**	2	8	Ret	146.5
2	(France) Côme Ledogar	5	4	5	10	5	**1**	Ret	7	**2**	3	1	**4**	1	1	120.5
3	(United Kingdom) Ashley Babbra	2	3	1	4	4	4	6	9	3	2	19	7	Ret	**4**	104
4	(France) Mike Courquin	1	2	13	3	2	2	9	Ret	9	DNS	9	3	**7**	2	93
5	(Spain) Javier Tarancon	3	6	3	Ret	11	3	3	2	7	4	7	14	Ret	3	83
6	(France) Arno Santamato	**DNS**	5	**Ret**	1	3	6	7	3	Ret	11	4	5	3	7	75
7	(France) Mathieu Maurage	DNS	Ret	4	5	10	5	Ret	8	10	20	6	6	6	5	43.5
8	(France) Hugo Valente	4	7	Ret	Ret	Ret	Ret	Ret	11	8	5	Ret	1	2	17	42
9	(Spain) Jordi Cunill	8	Ret	2	9	Ret	19			14	13	2	10	4	Ret	34
10	(Canada) Elie Arseneau	7	8	6	6	8	18	Ret	16	4	10	21	Ret	Ret	8	32
11	(France) Michaël Denis	10	Ret	8	8	14	8	2	5	11	12	10	9	11	Ret	31
12	(France) Vincent Beltoise	DNS	9	Ret	13	7	7	4	6	Ret	**21**	18	8	DSQ	10	29
13	(France) Maxime Pialat	DNS	13	10	11	9	9	19	22	5	6	8	DNS	10	6	24.5
14	(France) Kévin Bole Besançon	Ret	Ret	Ret	14	6	Ret	18	4	12	8	13	Ret			16
15	(France) David Assaad	Ret	12	Ret	12	15	14	8	15	13	9	5	13	Ret	9	13
16	(France) Boris Bouvier	Ret	17	Ret	Ret	18	12	17	18	6	7	20	11			9
17	(France) Romain Vozniak	11	Ret	9	Ret	Ret	17	5	12	18	22	12	17	Ret	15	8
18	(France) Clément Sudre	DNS	10	14	7	12	Ret	10	13	16	16	14	12			6
=18	(United Arab Emirates) Saeed Al Mehairi	9	11	Ret	Ret	17	10	20	14	15	15	11	16	5	14	6
20	(France) Gary Chalandon	Ret	Ret	DNS	DNS	13	Ret	11	10	20	17	15	18			1
=20	(United Arab Emirates) Mohamed Al Mutawaa	Ret	16	Ret	16	21	16	16	23	17	14	Ret	15	9	12	1
22	(United Arab Emirates) Mohammed Al Awadi	Ret	14	12	Ret	19	13	15	20	19	19	17	20	Ret	16	0
23	(France) Marc-Antoine Dannielou	12	15	11	17	20	15	13	19	Ret	18	Ret	19	12	13	0
23	(France) Carole Perrin	Ret	Ret	Ret	15	16	Ret	12	17			16	21			0
guest drivers ineligible for points
	(France) Benjamin Beauclair					Ret	11									0
	(France) Wilson Philippe													Ret	11	0
	(Belgium) Eliott Bachelart							14	21							0
Pos	Driver	LED 1 (France)	LED 2 (France)	PAU 1 (France)	PAU 2 (France)	MAG 1 (France)	MAG 2 (France)	SPA 1 (Belgium)	SPA 2 (Belgium)	BRN 1 (Czech Republic)	BRN 2 (Czech Republic)	LEM 1 (France)	LEM 2 (France)	NOR 1 (United Kingdom)	NOR 2 (United Kingdom)	Total

Colour	Result
Gold	Winner
Silver	Second place
Bronze	Third place
Green	Points classification
Blue	Non-points classification
Blue	Non-classified finish (NC)
Purple	Retired, not classified (Ret)
Red	Did not qualify (DNQ)
Red	Did not pre-qualify (DNPQ)
Black	Disqualified (DSQ)
White	Did not start (DNS)
White	Withdrew (WD)
White	Race cancelled (C)
Blank	Did not practice (DNP)
Blank	Did not arrive (DNA)
Blank	Excluded (EX)

**Bold** – Pole
Italics – Fastest Lap
