= Riccardo Agostini =

Italian racing driver (born 1994)

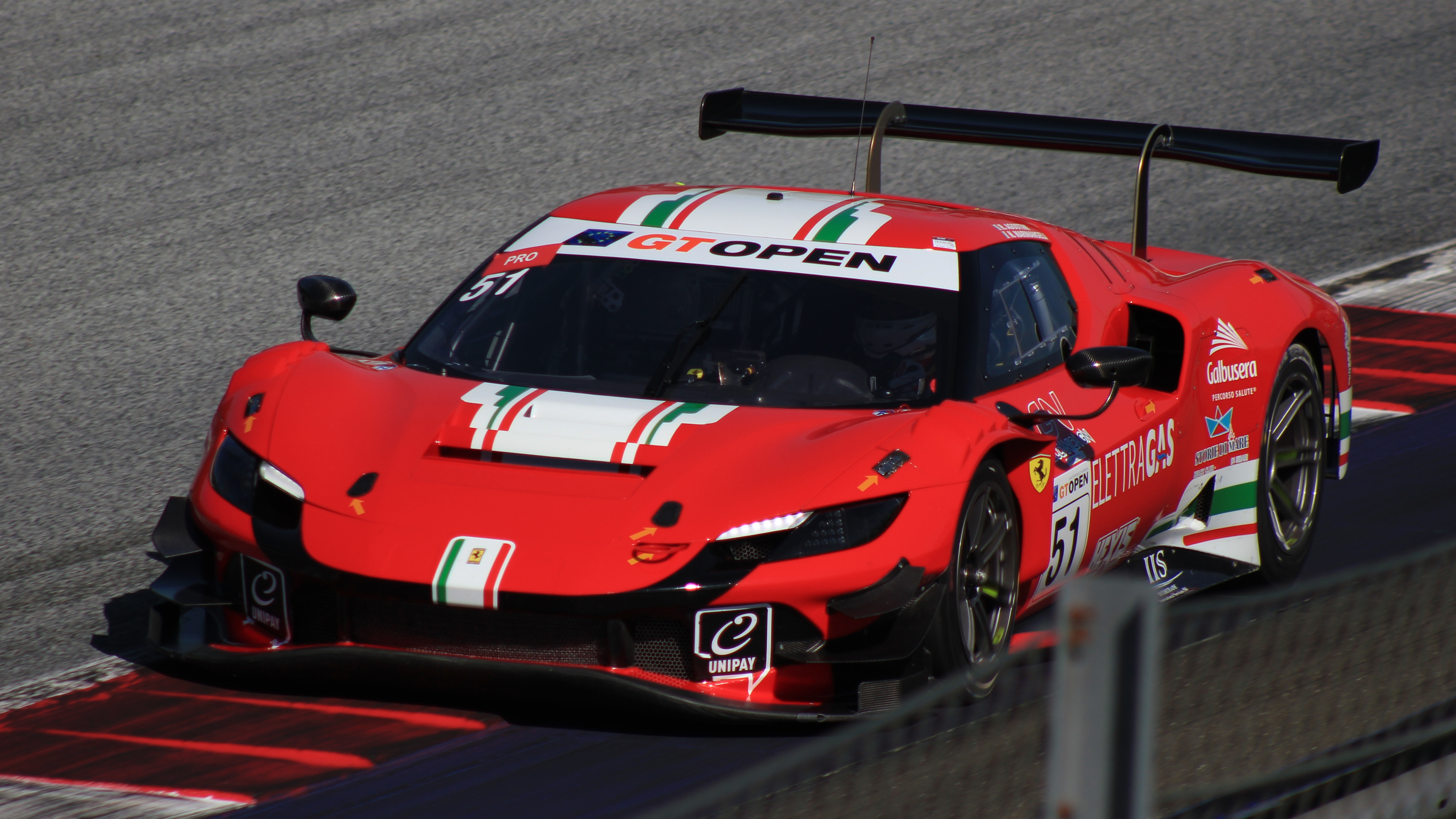
- Agostini in 2023
- Nationality: Italian
- Born: 20 April 1994 (age 32) Padua, Italy

Porsche Carrera Cup Italy career
- Debut season: 2015
- Current team: Antonelli Motorsport
- Categorisation: FIA Gold
- Car number: 25
- Starts: 13
- Wins: 5
- Poles: 3
- Fastest laps: 4
- Best finish: 1st in 2015

Previous series
- 2014 2014 2013 2013 2012 2010–11: GP3 Series; FIA European F3 Championship; Formula Renault 3.5 Series; Auto GP; Italian Formula Three; Formula Abarth

Championship titles
- 2015 2012 2012: Porsche Carrera Cup Italy; Italian F3 European Series; Italian F3 Italian Series

Riccardo Agostini (born 20 April 1994 in Padua) is an Italian racing driver who currently competes in the Italian GT Championship for AF Corse in a Ferrari 488 GT3 Evo 2020.

== Career ==
=== Karting ===
Agostini began karting in 2000 and raced primarily in his native Italy for the majority of this part of career, working his way up from the junior ranks to progress through to the KF2 category by 2010 and finishing 12th in CIK-FIA European Championship.

=== Formula Abarth ===
In 2010, Agostini graduated to single–seaters into the newly launched Formula Abarth series in Italy, stating with Prema Junior. He won the feature race in Imola and finished the season eleventh. Agostini stayed in Formula Abarth for a second season in 2011 but switched to debutants Villorba Corse, when the series split in European and Italian series. After four rounds, he had another switch to JD Motorsport. Despite having just one podium in both Italian and European Series he improved to seventh and eighth respectively.

=== Italian Formula Three ===
In 2012, Agostini continued his collaboration with JD Motorsport into Italian Formula Three Championship.

=== GP3 Series ===
Agostini joined Hilmer Motorsport from the second round of the 2014 GP3 Series. He finished 16th in the standings and was the only driver to score points for the team.

=== Formula One ===
On 9 November 2012, Agostini tested a Scuderia Ferrari Formula One car as a prize for claiming the Rookie title in Italian Formula Three.

== Racing record ==
=== Career summary ===
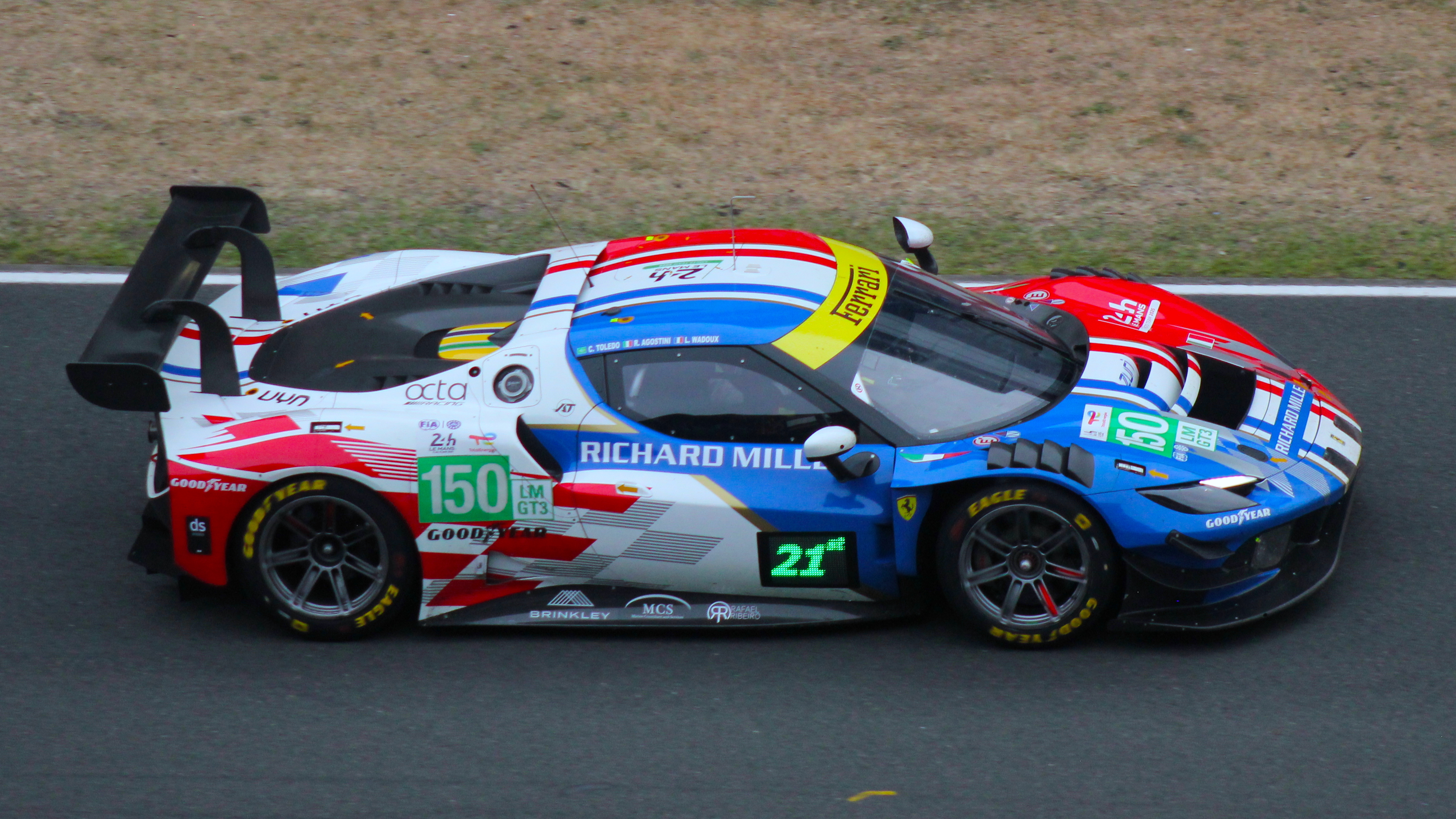
Agostini's No. 150 car at the 2025 24 Hours of Le Mans

Season	Series	Team	Races	Wins	Poles	F/Laps	Podiums	Points	Position
2010	Formula Abarth	Prema Junior	14	1	1	1	2	49	11th
2011	Formula Abarth Italian Series	Villorba Corse	6	0	0	0	0	66	7th
2011	Formula Abarth Italian Series	JD Motorsport	8	0	0	0	0	66	7th
2011	Formula Abarth European Series	Villorba Corse	4	0	0	0	0	54	8th
2011	Formula Abarth European Series	JD Motorsport	10	0	0	0	1	54	8th
2011	Formula Pilota China	JD Motorsport	2	0	0	0	1	20	12th
2012	Italian Formula 3 European Series	JD Motorsport	24	6	6	11	16	281	**1st**
2012	Italian Formula 3 Championship	JD Motorsport	18	5	5	10	15	209	**1st**
2013	Auto GP	Manor MP Motorsport	8	0	0	1	1	53	10th
2013	Formula Renault 3.5 Series	Zeta Corse	2	0	0	0	0	0	NC
2014	GP3 Series	Hilmer Motorsport	16	0	0	0	0	18	16th
2014	FIA Formula 3 European Championship	EuroInternational	9	0	0	0	0	1	26th
2015	Porsche Carrera Cup Italy	Antonelli Motorsport	13	5	3	4	6	183	**1st**
2016	Italian GT Championship	Antonelli Motorsport	12	1	0	2	7	141	7th
2016	Lamborghini Super Trofeo Europe	Antonelli Motorsport	2	0	0	0	0	0	NC
2016	Lamborghini Super Trofeo World Final	Antonelli Motorsport	1	0	0	0	0	N/A	11th
2017	Lamborghini Super Trofeo North America	Prestige Performance	12	7	3	4	11	161	**1st**
2017	Lamborghini Super Trofeo Asia - Pro	Emperor Racing	2	0	0	0	0	0	NC†
2017	Lamborghini Super Trofeo World Final	Wayne Taylor Racing	1	1	1	0	1	N/A	**1st**
2018	International GT Open	Imperiale Racing	14	1	0	0	5	89	5th
2018	Lamborghini Super Trofeo Middle East	GDL Racing	4	4	2	2	4	0	NC†
2019	International GT Open	Antonelli Motorsport	4	0	0	0	2	35	10th
2019	Italian GT Championship - GT3	Antonelli Motorsport	12	3	7	2	5	106	**1st**
2020	Italian GT Championship - GT3	Audi Sport Italia	12	3	2	1	7	127	**1st**
2021	International GT Open	Audi Sport Italia	2	0	0	0	0	10	25th
2021	Italian GT Championship - GT3 Sprint	Audi Sport Italia	8	1	1	1	3	91	**1st**
2021	Italian GT Championship - GT3 Endurance	Audi Sport Italia	4	3	0	1	3	60	**1st**
2022	Italian GT Championship - GT3	Easy Race	4	0	0	0	0	16	NC
2023	International GT Open	AF Corse	13	1	0	0	3	90	6th
2023	Italian GT Championship - GT3	AF Corse	2	0	1	2	1	18	NC
2023	Porsche Carrera Cup Italy	Scuderia Villorba Corse	12	0	0	0	4	147	**3rd**
2024	Le Mans Cup - GT3	AF Corse	7	1	1	3	5	91.5	**2nd**
2024	GT World Challenge America - Pro-Am	AF Corse	5	0	0	0	0	50	12th
2024	IMSA SportsCar Championship - GTD	Triarsi Competizione	2	0	0	0	0	422	45th
2024	International GT Open	Spirit of Race	2	0	0	0	0	1	35th
2024-25	Asian Le Mans Series - GT	AF Corse	6	0	0	2	1	26	9th
2025	IMSA SportsCar Championship - GTD	AF Corse	1	0	0	0	0	723	37th
2025	IMSA SportsCar Championship - GTD	Triarsi Competizione	2	0	0	0	0	723	37th
2025	European Le Mans Series - LMGT3	Richard Mille AF Corse	6	2	0	0	2	70	**2nd**
2025	24 Hours of Le Mans - LMGT3	Richard Mille AF Corse	1	0	0	0	0	N/A	11th
2025	GT World Challenge Europe Endurance Cup	AF Corse	1	0	0	0	0	0	NC
2025-26	Asian Le Mans Series - GT	Vista AF Corse	2	0	0	0	0	0	35th
2026	IMSA SportsCar Championship - GTD Pro	Triarsi Competizione	5	0	0	0	0	1240	11th
2026	GT World Challenge America - Pro-Am	Triarsi Competizione	3	0	2	0	0	26	13th
2026	European Le Mans Series - LMGT3	Richard Mille AF Corse	5	0	0	0	0	20	18th
2026	24 Hours of Le Mans - LMGT3	Richard Mille AF Corse	1	0	0	0	0	N/A	8th

^{†} As Agostini was a guest driver, he was ineligible for championship points.

^{*} Season still in progress.

=== Complete Auto GP results ===
(key) (Races in bold indicate pole position) (Races in italics indicate fastest lap)

Year	Entrant	1	2	3	4	5	6	7	8	9	10	11	12	13	14	15	16	Pos	Points
2013	Manor MP Motorsport	**MNZ**; **1**; 7	MNZ; 2; 5	MAR; 1; 4	MAR; 2 Ret	HUN; 1; 4	HUN; 2; 3	SIL; 1; 15	SIL; 2; 9	MUG; 1	MUG; 2	NÜR; 1	NÜR; 2	DON; 1	DON; 2	BRN; 1	BRN; 2	10th	53

=== Complete FIA European Formula 3 Championship results ===
(key)

Year	Entrant	Engine	1	2	3	4	5	6	7	8	9	10	11	12	13	14	15	16	17	18	19	20	21	22	23	24	25	26	27	28	29	30	31	32	33	DC	Points
2014	EuroInternational	Mercedes	SIL; 1; 21	SIL; 2; 23	SIL; 3; 22†	HOC; 1 Ret	HOC; 2; 18	HOC; 3; 10	PAU; 1; 22†	PAU; 2; 14	PAU; 3 Ret	HUN; 1	HUN; 2	HUN; 3	SPA; 1	SPA; 2	SPA; 3	NOR; 1	NOR; 2	NOR; 3	MSC; 1	MSC; 2	MSC; 3	RBR; 1	RBR; 2	RBR; 3	NÜR; 1	NÜR; 2	NÜR; 3	IMO; 1	IMO; 2	IMO; 3	HOC; 1	HOC; 2	HOC; 3	26th	1

^{†} Driver did not finish the race, but was classified as he completed over 90% of the race distance.

=== Complete GP3 Series results ===
(key) (Races in bold indicate pole position) (Races in italics indicate fastest lap)

Year	Entrant	1	2	3	4	5	6	7	8	9	10	11	12	13	14	15	16	17	18	Pos	Points
2014	Hilmer Motorsport	CAT; FEA	CAT; SPR	RBR; FEA; Ret	RBR; SPR; 11	SIL; FEA; 6	SIL; SPR; 5	HOC; FEA; 9	HOC; SPR; 8	HUN; FEA; 18	HUN; SPR; 19	SPA; FEA; 10	SPA; SPR; 12	MNZ; FEA; 15	MNZ; SPR; 12	SOC; FEA; 11	SOC; SPR; Ret	YMC; FEA; 18	YMC; SPR; 13	16th	18

=== Complete Porsche Carrera Cup Italia results ===
(key) (Races in bold indicate pole position) (Races in italics indicate fastest lap)

Year	Team	1	2	3	4	5	6	7	8	9	10	11	12	13	Pos.	Points
2015	Antonelli Motorsport Centro Porsche Padova	MNZ1; 1; 1	MNZ1; 2; 1	IMO; 1; 2	IMO; 2; 4	**MUG1**; **1**; 1	MUG1; 2; 1	SPA; 6	**VLL**; **1**; 1	VLL; 2 Ret	MIS; 1; 4	MIS; 2; 4	**MUG2**; **1**; 4	MUG2; 2; 4	1st	183

=== Complete WeatherTech SportsCar Championship results ===
(key) (Races in bold indicate pole position; results in italics indicate fastest lap)

Year	Team	Class	Make	Engine	1	2	3	4	5	6	7	8	9	10	Pos.	Points
2024	Triarsi Competizione	GTD	Ferrari 296 GT3	Ferrari F163CE 3.0 L Turbo V6	DAY; 4	SEB	LBH	LGA	WGL	MOS	ELK	VIR	IMS; 21	PET	45th	422
2025	AF Corse	GTD	Ferrari 296 GT3	Ferrari F163CE 3.0 L Turbo V6	DAY; 7	SEB	LBH								37th	723
2025	Triarsi Competizione	GTD	Ferrari 296 GT3	Ferrari F163CE 3.0 L Turbo V6				LGA; 7	WGL	MOS	ELK	VIR	IMS	PET; 14	37th	723
2026	Triarsi Competizione	GTD Pro	Ferrari 296 GT3 Evo	Ferrari F163CE 3.0 L Turbo V6	DAY; 8	SEB; 7	LGA	DET	WGL; 6	MOS	ELK; 7	VIR	IMS	PET; 13	11th	1240

=== Complete European Le Mans Series results ===
(key) (Races in bold indicate pole position; results in italics indicate fastest lap)

Year	Entrant	Class	Chassis	Engine	1	2	3	4	5	6	Rank	Points
2025	Richard Mille AF Corse	LMGT3	Ferrari 296 GT3	Ferrari F163CE 3.0 L Turbo V6	CAT; 9	LEC; 1	IMO; 8	SPA; 5	MUG; 1	ALG; 8	2nd	70
2026	Richard Mille AF Corse	LMGT3	Ferrari 296 GT3 Evo	Ferrari F163CE 3.0 L Turbo V6	CAT; 5	LEC; Ret	IMO; 8	SPA; Ret	SIL; WD	ALG; 7	18th	20

=== 24 Hours of Le Mans results ===
Year	Team	Co-Drivers	Car	Class	Laps	Pos.	Class Pos.
2025	(Italy) Richard Mille AF Corse	(Brazil) Custodio Toledo (France) Lilou Wadoux	Ferrari 296 GT3	LMGT3	338	43rd	11th
2026	(Italy) Richard Mille AF Corse	(Brazil) Custodio Toledo (France) Lilou Wadoux	Ferrari 296 GT3 Evo	LMGT3	334	40th	8th

Sporting positions
Preceded by Sergio Campana	Italian Formula Three (European & Italian Series); Champion; 2012	Succeeded by none
Preceded by Matteo Cairoli	Porsche Carrera Cup Italy; Champion; 2015	Succeeded by Côme Ledogar
