= 2026 Monterey SportsCar Championship =

Fourth round of the 2026 IMSA SportsCar Championship season

The layout of WeatherTech Raceway Laguna Seca, where the race was held

The 2026 Monterey SportsCar Championship (known as the 2026 StubHub Monterey SportsCar Championship for sponsorhip reasons) was a sports car race, held at WeatherTech Raceway Laguna Seca near Monterey, California, on May 3, 2026. It was the fourth round of the 2026 IMSA SportsCar Championship.

== Background ==
=== Preview ===
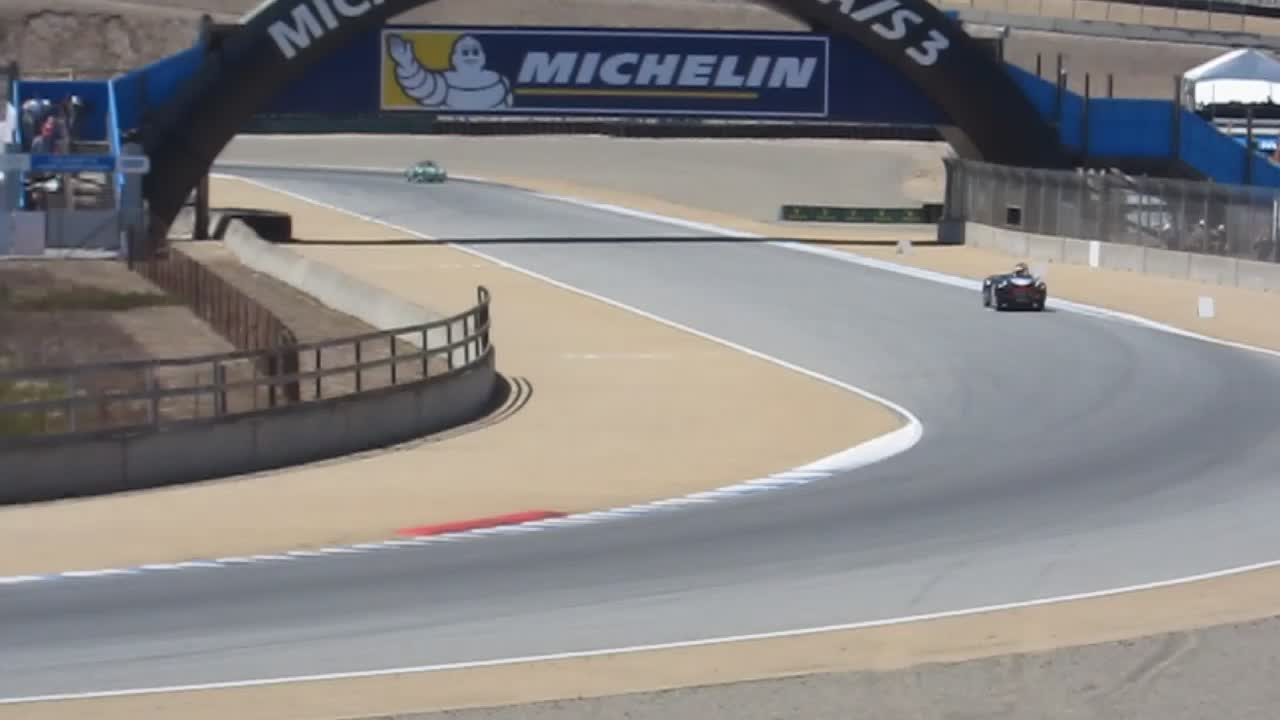
WeatherTech Raceway Laguna Seca, where the race was held

International Motor Sports Association (IMSA) president John Doonan confirmed the race was part of the schedule of the 2026 IMSA SportsCar Championship (IMSA SCC) in March 2025. It was the thirteenth consecutive year the race is a part of the IMSA SCC. The 2026 Monterey SportsCar Championship was the fourth of eleventh scheduled sports car races of 2025 by IMSA. The race was held at the eleven-turn 2.238 mi (3.602 km) WeatherTech Raceway Laguna Seca on May 3, 2026.

== Race ==
=== Race results ===
Class winners are in bold and ‡.

Pos	Class	No	Team	Drivers	Chassis	Laps	Time/Retired
Pos	Class	No	Team	Drivers	Engine	Laps	Time/Retired
1	**GTP**	**5**	**(United States) JDC-Miller MotorSports**	**(Netherlands) Tijmen van der Helm** **(Germany) Laurin Heinrich**	**Porsche 963**	**119**	**2:40:48.414‡**
1	**GTP**	**5**	**(United States) JDC-Miller MotorSports**	**(Netherlands) Tijmen van der Helm** **(Germany) Laurin Heinrich**	**Porsche 9RD 4.6 L Turbo V8**	**119**	**2:40:48.414‡**
2	GTP	31	(United States) Cadillac Whelen	(United Kingdom) Jack Aitken (New Zealand) Earl Bamber	Cadillac V-Series.R	119	+0.758
2	GTP	31	(United States) Cadillac Whelen	(United Kingdom) Jack Aitken (New Zealand) Earl Bamber	Cadillac LMC55R 5.5 L V8	119	+0.758
3	GTP	25	(Belgium) BMW M Team WRT	(Austria) Philipp Eng (Germany) Marco Wittmann	BMW M Hybrid V8	119	+3.343
3	GTP	25	(Belgium) BMW M Team WRT	(Austria) Philipp Eng (Germany) Marco Wittmann	BMW P66/3 4.0 L Turbo V8	119	+3.343
4	GTP	60	(United States) Meyer Shank Racing with Curb-Agajanian	(United Kingdom) Tom Blomqvist (United States) Colin Braun	Acura ARX-06	119	+4.108
4	GTP	60	(United States) Meyer Shank Racing with Curb-Agajanian	(United Kingdom) Tom Blomqvist (United States) Colin Braun	Acura AR24e 2.4 L Turbo V6	119	+4.108
5	GTP	93	(United States) Meyer Shank Racing with Curb-Agajanian	(Netherlands) Renger van der Zande (United Kingdom) Nick Yelloly	Acura ARX-06	119	+6.688
5	GTP	93	(United States) Meyer Shank Racing with Curb-Agajanian	(Netherlands) Renger van der Zande (United Kingdom) Nick Yelloly	Acura AR24e 2.4 L Turbo V6	119	+6.688
6	GTP	6	(Germany) Porsche Penske Motorsport	(France) Kévin Estre (Belgium) Laurens Vanthoor	Porsche 963	119	+7.194
6	GTP	6	(Germany) Porsche Penske Motorsport	(France) Kévin Estre (Belgium) Laurens Vanthoor	Porsche 9RD 4.6 L Turbo V8	119	+7.194
7	GTP	7	(Germany) Porsche Penske Motorsport	(France) Julien Andlauer (Brazil) Felipe Nasr	Porsche 963	119	+7.645
7	GTP	7	(Germany) Porsche Penske Motorsport	(France) Julien Andlauer (Brazil) Felipe Nasr	Porsche 9RD 4.6 L Turbo V8	119	+7.645
8	GTP	23	(United States) Aston Martin THOR Team	(Canada) Roman De Angelis (United Kingdom) Ross Gunn	Aston Martin Valkyrie	119	+8.010
8	GTP	23	(United States) Aston Martin THOR Team	(Canada) Roman De Angelis (United Kingdom) Ross Gunn	Aston Martin RA 6.5 L V12	119	+8.010
9	GTP	24	(Belgium) BMW M Team WRT	(South Africa) Sheldon van der Linde (Belgium) Dries Vanthoor	BMW M Hybrid V8	119	+23.102
9	GTP	24	(Belgium) BMW M Team WRT	(South Africa) Sheldon van der Linde (Belgium) Dries Vanthoor	BMW P66/3 4.0 L Turbo V8	119	+23.102
10	GTP	40	(United States) Cadillac Wayne Taylor Racing	(Switzerland) Louis Delétraz (United States) Jordan Taylor	Cadillac V-Series.R	119	+1:07.604
10	GTP	40	(United States) Cadillac Wayne Taylor Racing	(Switzerland) Louis Delétraz (United States) Jordan Taylor	Cadillac LMC55R 5.5 L V8	119	+1:07.604
11	**GTD Pro**	**65**	**(United States) Ford Racing**	**(Germany) Christopher Mies** **(Belgium) Frédéric Vervisch**	**Ford Mustang GT3 Evo**	**111**	**+8 Laps‡**
11	**GTD Pro**	**65**	**(United States) Ford Racing**	**(Germany) Christopher Mies** **(Belgium) Frédéric Vervisch**	**Ford Coyote 5.4 L V8**	**111**	**+8 Laps‡**
12	GTD Pro	4	(United States) Corvette Racing by Pratt Miller Motorsports	(Netherlands) Nicky Catsburg (United States) Tommy Milner	Chevrolet Corvette Z06 GT3.R	111	+8 Laps
12	GTD Pro	4	(United States) Corvette Racing by Pratt Miller Motorsports	(Netherlands) Nicky Catsburg (United States) Tommy Milner	Chevrolet LT6.R 5.5 L V8	111	+8 Laps
13	GTD Pro	77	(United States) AO Racing	(United Kingdom) Harry King (United Kingdom) Nick Tandy	Porsche 911 GT3 R (992.2)	111	+8 Laps
13	GTD Pro	77	(United States) AO Racing	(United Kingdom) Harry King (United Kingdom) Nick Tandy	Porsche M97/80 4.2 L Flat-6	111	+8 Laps
14	GTD Pro	3	(United States) Corvette Racing by Pratt Miller Motorsports	(Spain) Antonio García (United Kingdom) Alexander Sims	Chevrolet Corvette Z06 GT3.R	111	+8 Laps
14	GTD Pro	3	(United States) Corvette Racing by Pratt Miller Motorsports	(Spain) Antonio García (United Kingdom) Alexander Sims	Chevrolet LT6.R 5.5 L V8	111	+8 Laps
15	GTD Pro	9	(Canada) Pfaff Motorsports	(Italy) Andrea Caldarelli (United Kingdom) Sandy Mitchell	Lamborghini Temerario GT3	111	+8 Laps
15	GTD Pro	9	(Canada) Pfaff Motorsports	(Italy) Andrea Caldarelli (United Kingdom) Sandy Mitchell	Lamborghini L411 4.0 L Turbo V8	111	+8 Laps
16	GTD Pro	64	(United States) Ford Racing	(United Kingdom) Ben Barker (Norway) Dennis Olsen	Ford Mustang GT3 Evo	111	+8 Laps
16	GTD Pro	64	(United States) Ford Racing	(United Kingdom) Ben Barker (Norway) Dennis Olsen	Ford Coyote 5.4 L V8	111	+8 Laps
17	GTD Pro	59	(United States) RLL Team McLaren	(United States) Max Esterson (United States) Nikita Johnson	McLaren 720S GT3 Evo	111	+8 Laps
17	GTD Pro	59	(United States) RLL Team McLaren	(United States) Max Esterson (United States) Nikita Johnson	McLaren M840T 4.0 L Turbo V8	111	+8 Laps
18	**GTD**	**45**	**(United States) Wayne Taylor Racing**	**(Costa Rica) Danny Formal** **(United States) Trent Hindman**	**Lamborghini Huracán GT3 Evo 2**	**111**	**+8 Laps‡**
18	**GTD**	**45**	**(United States) Wayne Taylor Racing**	**(Costa Rica) Danny Formal** **(United States) Trent Hindman**	**Lamborghini DGF 5.2 L V10**	**111**	**+8 Laps‡**
19	GTD Pro	1	(United States) Paul Miller Racing	(United States) Connor De Phillippi (United States) Neil Verhagen	BMW M4 GT3 Evo	110	+9 Laps
19	GTD Pro	1	(United States) Paul Miller Racing	(United States) Connor De Phillippi (United States) Neil Verhagen	BMW P58 3.0 L Turbo I6	110	+9 Laps
20	GTD	27	(United States) Heart of Racing Team	(Brazil) Eduardo Barrichello (United Kingdom) Tom Gamble	Aston Martin Vantage AMR GT3 Evo	110	+9 Laps
20	GTD	27	(United States) Heart of Racing Team	(Brazil) Eduardo Barrichello (United Kingdom) Tom Gamble	Aston Martin AMR16A 4.0 L Turbo V8	110	+9 Laps
21	GTD	70	(United Kingdom) Inception Racing	(United States) Brendan Iribe (Denmark) Frederik Schandorff	Ferrari 296 GT3 Evo	110	+9 Laps
21	GTD	70	(United Kingdom) Inception Racing	(United States) Brendan Iribe (Denmark) Frederik Schandorff	Ferrari F163CE 3.0 L Turbo V6	110	+9 Laps
22	GTD	120	(United States) Wright Motorsports	(United States) Adam Adelson (United Kingdom) Callum Ilott	Porsche 911 GT3 R (992.2)	110	+9 Laps
22	GTD	120	(United States) Wright Motorsports	(United States) Adam Adelson (United Kingdom) Callum Ilott	Porsche M97/80 4.2 L Flat-6	110	+9 Laps
23	GTD	57	(United States) Winward Racing	(Switzerland) Philip Ellis (United States) Russell Ward	Mercedes-AMG GT3 Evo	110	+9 Laps
23	GTD	57	(United States) Winward Racing	(Switzerland) Philip Ellis (United States) Russell Ward	Mercedes-AMG M159 6.2 L V8	110	+9 Laps
24	GTD	12	(United States) Vasser Sullivan Racing	(Denmark) Benjamin Pedersen (United States) Aaron Telitz	Lexus RC F GT3	110	+9 Laps
24	GTD	12	(United States) Vasser Sullivan Racing	(Denmark) Benjamin Pedersen (United States) Aaron Telitz	Toyota 2UR-GSE 5.4 L V8	110	+9 Laps
25	GTD	96	(United States) Turner Motorsport	(United States) Robby Foley (United States) Patrick Gallagher	BMW M4 GT3 Evo	110	+9 Laps
25	GTD	96	(United States) Turner Motorsport	(United States) Robby Foley (United States) Patrick Gallagher	BMW P58 3.0 L Turbo I6	110	+9 Laps
26	GTD Pro	14	(United States) Vasser Sullivan Racing	(United Kingdom) Ben Barnicoat (United Kingdom) Jack Hawksworth	Lexus RC F GT3	110	+9 Laps
26	GTD Pro	14	(United States) Vasser Sullivan Racing	(United Kingdom) Ben Barnicoat (United Kingdom) Jack Hawksworth	Toyota 2UR-GSE 5.4 L V8	110	+9 Laps
27	GTD	16	(United States) Myers Riley Motorsports	(Brazil) Felipe Fraga (United States) Sheena Monk	Ford Mustang GT3 Evo	110	+9 Laps
27	GTD	16	(United States) Myers Riley Motorsports	(Brazil) Felipe Fraga (United States) Sheena Monk	Ford Coyote 5.4 L V8	110	+9 Laps
28	GTD	66	(United States) Gradient Racing	(United States) Jake Walker (United States) Corey Lewis	Ford Mustang GT3 Evo	110	+9 Laps
28	GTD	66	(United States) Gradient Racing	(United States) Jake Walker (United States) Corey Lewis	Ford Coyote 5.4 L V8	110	+9 Laps
29	GTD	19	(United States) van der Steur Racing	(Australia) Scott Andrews (United States) Rory van der Steur	Aston Martin Vantage AMR GT3 Evo	110	+9 Laps
29	GTD	19	(United States) van der Steur Racing	(Australia) Scott Andrews (United States) Rory van der Steur	Aston Martin AMR16A 4.0 L Turbo V8	110	+9 Laps
30	GTD	81	(United States) DragonSpeed	(Italy) Giacomo Altoè (Sweden) Henrik Hedman	Chevrolet Corvette Z06 GT3.R	109	+10 Laps
30	GTD	81	(United States) DragonSpeed	(Italy) Giacomo Altoè (Sweden) Henrik Hedman	Chevrolet LT6.R 5.5 L V8	109	+10 Laps
31 DNF	GTD	13	(Canada) 13 Autosport	(United Kingdom) Matt Bell (Canada) Orey Fidani	Chevrolet Corvette Z06 GT3.R	47	Mechanical
31 DNF	GTD	13	(Canada) 13 Autosport	(United Kingdom) Matt Bell (Canada) Orey Fidani	Chevrolet LT6.R 5.5 L V8	47	Mechanical
32 DNF	GTD	34	(United States) Conquest Racing	(Spain) Albert Costa (Italy) Lorenzo Patrese	Ferrari 296 GT3 Evo	36	Engine
32 DNF	GTD	34	(United States) Conquest Racing	(Spain) Albert Costa (Italy) Lorenzo Patrese	Ferrari F163CE 3.0 L Turbo V6	36	Engine
33 DNF	GTP	10	(United States) Cadillac Wayne Taylor Racing	(Portugal) Filipe Albuquerque (United States) Ricky Taylor	Cadillac V-Series.R	25	Contact
33 DNF	GTP	10	(United States) Cadillac Wayne Taylor Racing	(Portugal) Filipe Albuquerque (United States) Ricky Taylor	Cadillac LMC55R 5.5 L V8	25	Contact

IMSA SportsCar Championship
Previous race: Grand Prix of Long Beach	2026 season	Next race: Chevrolet Detroit Sports Car Classic
