= 2026–27 Asian Le Mans Series =

Sports car racing series

The 2026–27 Asian Le Mans Series, also branded as the Winter Le Mans Series, will be the fifteenth season of the Automobile Club de l'Ouest's Asian Le Mans Series. It is the fourth 24 Hours of Le Mans-based series created by the ACO, following the American Le Mans Series (since merged with the Rolex Sports Car Series to form the IMSA SportsCar Championship), the European Le Mans Series and the FIA World Endurance Championship.

Due to the geopolitical impact of the Iran war in Asia, the series exceptionally shifted its calendar to Europe. The six-event season will begin at Circuit Paul Ricard in France on 14 November 2026 and conclude at the Algarve International Circuit in Portugal on 21 February 2027. It marked the debut of the Hypercar (LMH and LMDh) class in the series, reserved for Pro-Am entries only, with LMP3 dropped and accommodated in a new support series called the Asian Le Mans Cup.

== Calendar ==
After months of uncertainty around the geopolitical impact of the 2026 Iran war, the calendar for the 2026–27 season was announced by the Automobile Club de l'Ouest on 3 August 2026. The ongoing conflict in the Middle East prevented a return to Abu Dhabi and Dubai, and backup plans involving Sepang and Buriram fell foul of existing circuit bookings and logistical costs. Instead, the series will be held entirely at European venues for the first time. It will comprise six four-hour length races, run at Paul Ricard, Jerez and Portimão. The Asian Le Mans Cup support series will make its debut, supporting every round.

Rnd	Race	Circuit	Location	Date	Supporting Events
1	4 Hours of Le Castellet by ALMS	(France) Circuit Paul Ricard	Le Castellet, Var, France	14 November 2026	Asian Le Mans Cup
2	4 Hours of Le Castellet by ALMS	(France) Circuit Paul Ricard	Le Castellet, Var, France	15 November 2026	Asian Le Mans Cup
3	4 Hours of Jerez	(Spain) Circuito de Jerez	Jerez de la Frontera, Andalusia, Spain	16 January 2027	Asian Le Mans Cup
4	4 Hours of Jerez	(Spain) Circuito de Jerez	Jerez de la Frontera, Andalusia, Spain	17 January 2027	Asian Le Mans Cup
5	4 Hours of Portimão	(Portugal) Algarve International Circuit	Portimão, Algarve, Portugal	20 February 2027	Asian Le Mans Cup
6	4 Hours of Portimão	(Portugal) Algarve International Circuit	Portimão, Algarve, Portugal	21 February 2027	Asian Le Mans Cup
Map of circuit locations
2026–27 Asian Le Mans Series is located in Europe

== Entry list ==
=== Hypercar ===
Entrant/Team	Car	Engine	Hybrid	No.	Drivers	Rounds
(Italy) Cetilar Racing	Ferrari 499P	Ferrari F163CG 3.0 L Turbo V6	Hybrid	47	(Italy) Antonio Fuoco	1–2
(Italy) Cetilar Racing	Ferrari 499P	Ferrari F163CG 3.0 L Turbo V6	Hybrid	47	(Italy) Nicola Lacorte	1–2
(Italy) Cetilar Racing	Ferrari 499P	Ferrari F163CG 3.0 L Turbo V6	Hybrid	47	(Italy) Roberto Lacorte	1–2
(Italy) AF Corse	Ferrari 499P	Ferrari F163CG 3.0 L Turbo V6	Hybrid	90	(Denmark) Nicklas Nielsen	1–2
(Italy) AF Corse	Ferrari 499P	Ferrari F163CG 3.0 L Turbo V6	Hybrid	90	(Argentina) Luis Pérez Companc	1–2
(Italy) AF Corse	Ferrari 499P	Ferrari F163CG 3.0 L Turbo V6	Hybrid	90	(China) Yifei Ye	1–2

==== Notes ====
- Gentleman driver François Perrodo was in talks to race a third Ferrari 499P for AF Corse. He later told Sportscar365 that he would not enter if the series moved to Europe.
- In November 2025, Bob Berridge's BBM Sport became the first team to commit to the Asian Le Mans Series' Hypercar class. The team, which already run old Peugeot LMP1 cars in historic racing, purchased three 2023-spec wingless Peugeot 9X8, two 2024-spec 9X8, and named Kriton Lendoudis as a driver. A full-season entry was eventually ruled out.
- Former WEC privateers Glickenhaus, Isotta Fraschini and Vanwall all targeted or evaluated programmes. In June 2026, Danish team High Class Racing partnered with Isotta Fraschini to resurrect the Tipo 6 LMH-C, and tested in Europe. In light of the low predicted turnout for the class, the effort was dropped.
- In March 2026, Porsche confirmed expectations of up to four Porsche 963 in the series. Former WEC client Proton Competition stated that it would supply customers with Hypercar efforts should there be interest. JDC–Miller MotorSports showed early interest, but opted to focus on IMSA. Reigning LMP2 champion Algarve Pro Racing plotted an effort of one or two Porsche 963, but later delayed its plans, citing the risk of running Bronze-rated drivers in the European winter.
- In May 2026, HRC US president David Salters confirmed ongoing discussions with multiple teams for a potential Acura ARX-06 programme. The project was unsuccessful.
- In October 2026, Lamborghini confirmed several inquiries had been made regarding the availability of the SC63.

=== LMP2 ===
All cars in the LMP2 class use the Gibson GK428 V8 engine and Michelin tyres.

Entrant/Team	Car	No.	Drivers	Rounds
(United Kingdom) United Autosports	Oreca 07	2	(Canada) Phil Fayer	1–2
(United Kingdom) United Autosports	Oreca 07	2	(Denmark) Mikkel Jensen	1–2
(United Kingdom) United Autosports	Oreca 07	2	(New Zealand) Hunter McElrea	1–2
(United Kingdom) United Autosports	Oreca 07	22	(Mexico) Ian Aguilera	1–2
(United Kingdom) United Autosports	Oreca 07	22	(United States) Sting Ray Robb	1–2
(United Kingdom) United Autosports	Oreca 07	22	(Italy) Giorgio Roda	1–2
(Luxembourg) DKR Engineering	Oreca 07	3	(Germany) Laurents Hörr	1–2
(Luxembourg) DKR Engineering	Oreca 07	3	(Germany) Hugo Schwarze	1–2
(Luxembourg) DKR Engineering	Oreca 07	3	(Belgium) Tom Van Rompuy	1–2
(United States) CrowdStrike Racing by APR	Oreca 07	4	(Switzerland) Louis Delétraz	1–2
(United States) CrowdStrike Racing by APR	Oreca 07	4	(Germany) Laurin Heinrich	1–2
(United States) CrowdStrike Racing by APR	Oreca 07	4	(United States) George Kurtz	1–2
(Portugal) Algarve Pro Racing	Oreca 07	20	(Denmark) Theodor Jensen	1–2
(Portugal) Algarve Pro Racing	Oreca 07	20	(Denmark) Jens Reno Møller	1–2
(Portugal) Algarve Pro Racing	Oreca 07	20	(Austria) Charlie Wurz	1–2
(Portugal) Algarve Pro Racing	Oreca 07	25	(Denmark) Malthe Jakobsen	1–2
(Portugal) Algarve Pro Racing	Oreca 07	25	(Denmark) Michael Jensen	1–2
(Portugal) Algarve Pro Racing	Oreca 07	25	(Italy) Enzo Trulli	1–2
(Germany) Proton Competition	Oreca 07	11	(Greece) Georgios Kolovos	1–2
(Germany) Proton Competition	Oreca 07	11	(France) Victor Martins	1–2
(Germany) Proton Competition	Oreca 07	11	(France) Charles Milesi	1–2
(Germany) Proton Competition	Oreca 07	66	(Austria) Horst Felbermayr Jr.	1–2
(Germany) Proton Competition	Oreca 07	66	(Austria) Horst Felix Felbermayr	1–2
(Germany) Proton Competition	Oreca 07	66	(Austria) Ferdinand Habsburg	1–2
(Poland) Team Virage	Oreca 07	16	(Republic of Ireland) Jonathan Browne	1–2
(Poland) Team Virage	Oreca 07	16	(Algeria) Leo Robinson	1–2
(Poland) Team Virage	Oreca 07	16	(Poland) Jacek Zielonka	1–2
(United Kingdom) Nielsen Racing	Oreca 07	24	(United States) Max Garcia	1–2
(United Kingdom) Nielsen Racing	Oreca 07	24	(United States) Scott Huffaker	1–2
(United Kingdom) Nielsen Racing	Oreca 07	24	(United States) Steven Thomas	1–2
(France) Duqueine Team	Oreca 07	30	(Australia) Gianmarco Pradel	1–2
(France) Duqueine Team	Oreca 07	30	(Sweden) August Raber	1–2
(France) Duqueine Team	Oreca 07	30	(Estonia) Antti Rammo	1–2
(Poland) Inter Europol Competition	Oreca 07	34	(Canada) Antoine Comeau	1–2
(Poland) Inter Europol Competition	Oreca 07	34	(United States) Bijoy Garg	1–2
(Poland) Inter Europol Competition	Oreca 07	34	(Netherlands) Niels Koolen	1–2
(Poland) Inter Europol Competition	Oreca 07	43	(Germany) Torsten Kratz	1–2
(Poland) Inter Europol Competition	Oreca 07	43	(United Kingdom) Cian Shields	1–2
(Poland) Inter Europol Competition	Oreca 07	43	(United Kingdom) Nick Yelloly	1–2
(Switzerland) CLX Motorsport	Oreca 07	37	(France) Adrien Closmenil	1–2
(Switzerland) CLX Motorsport	Oreca 07	37	(France) Louis Stern	1–2
(Switzerland) CLX Motorsport	Oreca 07	37	(France) Matthieu Vaxivière	1–2
(Italy) AF Corse	Oreca 07	55	(Lebanon) Alex Demirdjian	1–2
(Italy) AF Corse	Oreca 07	55	(Australia) Jack Doohan	1–2
(Italy) AF Corse	Oreca 07	55	(United Kingdom) Phil Hanson	1–2
(Italy) AF Corse	Oreca 07	83	(France) Julien Andlauer	1–2
(Italy) AF Corse	Oreca 07	83	(United States) Jeremy Clarke	1–2
(Italy) AF Corse	Oreca 07	83	(Argentina) Nico Varrone	1–2

- Jean Glorieux, Andres Latorre Canon, John Falb, Naveen Rao, Fabien Lavergne and François Perrodo were entered drivers at DKR Engineering, Team Virage, Algarve Pro Racing, Nielsen Racing, Duqueine Team and AF Corse respectively. All six were replaced prior to the start of the season.
- Jonas Ried was scheduled to compete for Proton Competition in its No. 11 LMP2 entry, but later switched to its No. 99 GT3 entry.
- Alessio Rovera was scheduled to compete for AF Corse in its No. 83 LMP2 entry, but later switched to its No. 51 GT3 entry.

=== GT3 ===
Entrant/Team	Car	Engine	No.	Drivers	Rounds
(Malaysia) Petrolife Racing Team	Mercedes-AMG GT3 Evo	Mercedes-AMG M159 6.2 L V8	7	(Denmark) Simon Birch	1–2
(Malaysia) Petrolife Racing Team	Mercedes-AMG GT3 Evo	Mercedes-AMG M159 6.2 L V8	7	(Denmark) Frederik Schandorff	1–2
(Malaysia) Petrolife Racing Team	Mercedes-AMG GT3 Evo	Mercedes-AMG M159 6.2 L V8	7	(France) Stéphane Tribaudini	1–2
(United Arab Emirates) Dragon Racing	Ferrari 296 GT3 Evo	Ferrari F163CE 3.0 L Turbo V6	8	(Zimbabwe) Axcil Jefferies	TBC
(United Arab Emirates) Dragon Racing	Ferrari 296 GT3 Evo	Ferrari F163CE 3.0 L Turbo V6	8	TBA	TBC
(United Arab Emirates) Dragon Racing	Ferrari 296 GT3 Evo	Ferrari F163CE 3.0 L Turbo V6	8	TBA	TBC
(Germany) GetSpeed	Mercedes-AMG GT3 Evo	Mercedes-AMG M159 6.2 L V8	9	(United States) Anthony Bartone	1–2
(Germany) GetSpeed	Mercedes-AMG GT3 Evo	Mercedes-AMG M159 6.2 L V8	9	(Luxembourg) Steve Jans	1–2
(Germany) GetSpeed	Mercedes-AMG GT3 Evo	Mercedes-AMG M159 6.2 L V8	9	(Germany) Fabian Schiller	1–2
(Germany) Herberth Motorsport	Porsche 911 GT3 R (992.2)	Porsche M97/80 4.2 L Flat-6	21	(Germany) Ralf Bohn	1–2
(Germany) Herberth Motorsport	Porsche 911 GT3 R (992.2)	Porsche M97/80 4.2 L Flat-6	21	(France) Mathieu Jaminet	1–2
(Germany) Herberth Motorsport	Porsche 911 GT3 R (992.2)	Porsche M97/80 4.2 L Flat-6	21	(Australia) Tom Sargent	1–2
(United States) Heart of Racing Team	Aston Martin Vantage AMR GT3 Evo	Aston Martin M177 4.0 L Turbo V8	26	(Brazil) Eduardo Barrichello	1–2
(United States) Heart of Racing Team	Aston Martin Vantage AMR GT3 Evo	Aston Martin M177 4.0 L Turbo V8	26	(Canada) Roman De Angelis	1–2
(United States) Heart of Racing Team	Aston Martin Vantage AMR GT3 Evo	Aston Martin M177 4.0 L Turbo V8	26	(United States) Gray Newell	1–2
(United States) Heart of Racing Team	Aston Martin Vantage AMR GT3 Evo	Aston Martin M177 4.0 L Turbo V8	27	(Italy) Mattia Drudi	1–2
(United States) Heart of Racing Team	Aston Martin Vantage AMR GT3 Evo	Aston Martin M177 4.0 L Turbo V8	27	(United Kingdom) Ian James	1–2
(United States) Heart of Racing Team	Aston Martin Vantage AMR GT3 Evo	Aston Martin M177 4.0 L Turbo V8	27	(Canada) Zacharie Robichon	1–2
(Bahrain) 2 Seas Motorsport	Mercedes-AMG GT3 Evo	Mercedes-AMG M159 6.2 L V8	33	(Israel) Guy Albag	1–2
(Bahrain) 2 Seas Motorsport	Mercedes-AMG GT3 Evo	Mercedes-AMG M159 6.2 L V8	33	(United Kingdom) Darren Leung	1–2
(Bahrain) 2 Seas Motorsport	Mercedes-AMG GT3 Evo	Mercedes-AMG M159 6.2 L V8	33	(United Kingdom) Chris Lulham	1–2
(Bahrain) 2 Seas Motorsport	Mercedes-AMG GT3 Evo	Mercedes-AMG M159 6.2 L V8	46	(United Kingdom) Charles Dawson	1–2
(Bahrain) 2 Seas Motorsport	Mercedes-AMG GT3 Evo	Mercedes-AMG M159 6.2 L V8	46	(United Kingdom) Kiern Jewiss	1–2
(Bahrain) 2 Seas Motorsport	Mercedes-AMG GT3 Evo	Mercedes-AMG M159 6.2 L V8	46	(Australia) Christian Mansell	1–2
(Japan) Ponos Racing	Ferrari 296 GT3 Evo	Ferrari F163CE 3.0 L Turbo V6	45	(Japan) Tadasuke Makino	1–2
(Japan) Ponos Racing	Ferrari 296 GT3 Evo	Ferrari F163CE 3.0 L Turbo V6	45	(Japan) Takuro Shinohara	1–2
(Japan) Ponos Racing	Ferrari 296 GT3 Evo	Ferrari F163CE 3.0 L Turbo V6	45	(Japan) Yorikatsu Tsujiko	1–2
(Japan) Ponos Racing	Ferrari 296 GT3 Evo	Ferrari F163CE 3.0 L Turbo V6	45	(Japan) Seita Nonaka	TBC
(Italy) AF Corse	Ferrari 296 GT3 Evo	Ferrari F163CE 3.0 L Turbo V6	50	(Republic of Ireland) Peter Dempsey	1–2
(Italy) AF Corse	Ferrari 296 GT3 Evo	Ferrari F163CE 3.0 L Turbo V6	50	(Spain) Rafael Durán	1–2
(Italy) AF Corse	Ferrari 296 GT3 Evo	Ferrari F163CE 3.0 L Turbo V6	50	(South Africa) David Perel	1–2
(Italy) AF Corse	Ferrari 296 GT3 Evo	Ferrari F163CE 3.0 L Turbo V6	51	(Belgium) Jef Machiels	1–2
(Italy) AF Corse	Ferrari 296 GT3 Evo	Ferrari F163CE 3.0 L Turbo V6	51	(Puerto Rico) Francesco Piovanetti	1–2
(Italy) AF Corse	Ferrari 296 GT3 Evo	Ferrari F163CE 3.0 L Turbo V6	51	(Italy) Alessio Rovera	1–2
(Denmark) High Class Racing	Porsche 911 GT3 R (992.2)	Porsche M97/80 4.2 L Flat-6	54	(Denmark) Anders Fjordbach	1–2
(Denmark) High Class Racing	Porsche 911 GT3 R (992.2)	Porsche M97/80 4.2 L Flat-6	54	(Germany) Thomas Kiefer	1–2
(Denmark) High Class Racing	Porsche 911 GT3 R (992.2)	Porsche M97/80 4.2 L Flat-6	54	(Denmark) Philip Lindberg	1–2
(Denmark) High Class Racing	Porsche 911 GT3 R (992.2)	Porsche M97/80 4.2 L Flat-6	54	(Austria) Harald Huber	TBC
(Japan) CarGuy Racing	Ferrari 296 GT3 Evo	Ferrari F163CE 3.0 L Turbo V6	57	(France) Mathys Jaubert	1–2
(Japan) CarGuy Racing	Ferrari 296 GT3 Evo	Ferrari F163CE 3.0 L Turbo V6	57	(Japan) Takeshi Kimura	1–2
(Japan) CarGuy Racing	Ferrari 296 GT3 Evo	Ferrari F163CE 3.0 L Turbo V6	57	(France) Esteban Masson	1–2
(United Kingdom) Garage 59	McLaren 720S GT3 Evo	McLaren M840T 4.0 L Turbo V8	58	(United States) Dustin Blattner	1–2
(United Kingdom) Garage 59	McLaren 720S GT3 Evo	McLaren M840T 4.0 L Turbo V8	58	(United Kingdom) Tom Fleming	1–2
(United Kingdom) Garage 59	McLaren 720S GT3 Evo	McLaren M840T 4.0 L Turbo V8	58	(Germany) Dennis Marschall	1–2
(United Kingdom) Garage 59	McLaren 720S GT3 Evo	McLaren M840T 4.0 L Turbo V8	60	(United Kingdom) Joseph Loake	1–2
(United Kingdom) Garage 59	McLaren 720S GT3 Evo	McLaren M840T 4.0 L Turbo V8	60	(Italy) Marco Pulcini	1–2
(United Kingdom) Garage 59	McLaren 720S GT3 Evo	McLaren M840T 4.0 L Turbo V8	60	(United Kingdom) Freddie Tomlinson	1–2
Team Qatar by Iron Lynx	Mercedes-AMG GT3 Evo	Mercedes-AMG M159 6.2 L V8	62	(Qatar) Abdulla Al-Khelaifi	1–2
Team Qatar by Iron Lynx	Mercedes-AMG GT3 Evo	Mercedes-AMG M159 6.2 L V8	62	(Germany) Julian Hanses	1–2
Team Qatar by Iron Lynx	Mercedes-AMG GT3 Evo	Mercedes-AMG M159 6.2 L V8	62	(Belgium) Maxime Martin	1–2
(Hong Kong) Craft-Bamboo Iron Lynx	Mercedes-AMG GT3 Evo	Mercedes-AMG M159 6.2 L V8	88	(Zimbabwe) Ameerh Naran	1–2
(Hong Kong) Craft-Bamboo Iron Lynx	Mercedes-AMG GT3 Evo	Mercedes-AMG M159 6.2 L V8	88	(Denmark) Mikkel Gaarde Pedersen	1–2
(Hong Kong) Craft-Bamboo Iron Lynx	Mercedes-AMG GT3 Evo	Mercedes-AMG M159 6.2 L V8	88	(Germany) Luca Stolz	1–2
(Hong Kong) Craft-Bamboo Iron Lynx	Mercedes-AMG GT3 Evo	Mercedes-AMG M159 6.2 L V8	88	(Brazil) Sérgio Sette Câmara	TBC
(Germany) Leipert Motorsport	Lamborghini Temerario GT3	Lamborghini L411 4.0 L Turbo V8	63	(United States) Lance Bergstein	1–2
(Germany) Leipert Motorsport	Lamborghini Temerario GT3	Lamborghini L411 4.0 L Turbo V8	63	(New Zealand) Brendon Leitch	1–2
(Germany) Leipert Motorsport	Lamborghini Temerario GT3	Lamborghini L411 4.0 L Turbo V8	63	(Australia) Nicolas Stati	1–2
(Germany) Haupt Racing Team	Ford Mustang GT3 Evo	Ford Coyote 5.4 L V8	64	(India) Arjun Maini	1–2
(Germany) Haupt Racing Team	Ford Mustang GT3 Evo	Ford Coyote 5.4 L V8	64	(United States) Michael Tosi	1–2
(Germany) Haupt Racing Team	Ford Mustang GT3 Evo	Ford Coyote 5.4 L V8	64	(Germany) Finn Wiebelhaus	1–2
(Germany) Haupt Racing Team	Ford Mustang GT3 Evo	Ford Coyote 5.4 L V8	65	(Germany) Hubert Haupt	1–2
(Germany) Haupt Racing Team	Ford Mustang GT3 Evo	Ford Coyote 5.4 L V8	65	(Switzerland) Fabio Scherer	1–2
(Germany) Haupt Racing Team	Ford Mustang GT3 Evo	Ford Coyote 5.4 L V8	65	(Germany) David Schumacher	1–2
(France) Car Blanche by RSL	Aston Martin Vantage AMR GT3 Evo	Aston Martin M177 4.0 L Turbo V8	68	(United Kingdom) Jonny Edgar	1–2
(France) Car Blanche by RSL	Aston Martin Vantage AMR GT3 Evo	Aston Martin M177 4.0 L Turbo V8	68	(France) Valentin Hasse-Clot	1–2
(France) Car Blanche by RSL	Aston Martin Vantage AMR GT3 Evo	Aston Martin M177 4.0 L Turbo V8	68	(France) Arnold Robin	1–2
(Belgium) Team WRT	BMW M4 GT3 Evo	BMW P58 3.0 L Turbo I6	69	(Germany) Max Hesse	1–2
(Belgium) Team WRT	BMW M4 GT3 Evo	BMW P58 3.0 L Turbo I6	69	(United States) Anthony McIntosh	1–2
(Belgium) Team WRT	BMW M4 GT3 Evo	BMW P58 3.0 L Turbo I6	69	(Canada) Parker Thompson	1–2
(United Kingdom) Ecurie Ecosse Blackthorn	Aston Martin Vantage AMR GT3 Evo	Aston Martin M177 4.0 L Turbo V8	70	(United Kingdom) Jonny Adam	1–2
(United Kingdom) Ecurie Ecosse Blackthorn	Aston Martin Vantage AMR GT3 Evo	Aston Martin M177 4.0 L Turbo V8	70	(Belgium) Kobe Pauwels	1–2
(United Kingdom) Ecurie Ecosse Blackthorn	Aston Martin Vantage AMR GT3 Evo	Aston Martin M177 4.0 L Turbo V8	70	(Italy) Giacomo Petrobelli	1–2
(Germany) Proton Competition	Porsche 911 GT3 R (992.2)	Porsche M97/80 4.2 L Flat-6	77	(Netherlands) Robert de Haan	1–2
(Germany) Proton Competition	Porsche 911 GT3 R (992.2)	Porsche M97/80 4.2 L Flat-6	77	(United States) Matt Kurzejewski	1–2
(Germany) Proton Competition	Porsche 911 GT3 R (992.2)	Porsche M97/80 4.2 L Flat-6	77	(Germany) Lenny Ried	1–2
(Germany) Proton Competition	Porsche 911 GT3 R (992.2)	Porsche M97/80 4.2 L Flat-6	77	(Japan) "Bankcy"	TBC
(Germany) Proton Competition	Porsche 911 GT3 R (992.2)	Porsche M97/80 4.2 L Flat-6	99	(United Kingdom) Harry King	1–2
(Germany) Proton Competition	Porsche 911 GT3 R (992.2)	Porsche M97/80 4.2 L Flat-6	99	(Germany) Christian Ried	1–2
(Germany) Proton Competition	Porsche 911 GT3 R (992.2)	Porsche M97/80 4.2 L Flat-6	99	(Germany) Jonas Ried	1–2
(Germany) Proton Competition	Porsche 911 GT3 R (992.2)	Porsche M97/80 4.2 L Flat-6	99	(Australia) Martin Berry	TBC
(United States) Winward Racing	Mercedes-AMG GT3 Evo	Mercedes-AMG M159 6.2 L V8	87	(Germany) Marvin Dienst	1–2
(United States) Winward Racing	Mercedes-AMG GT3 Evo	Mercedes-AMG M159 6.2 L V8	87	(Italy) Gabriele Piana	1–2
(United States) Winward Racing	Mercedes-AMG GT3 Evo	Mercedes-AMG M159 6.2 L V8	87	(Russia) Rinat Salikhov	1–2
(Germany) Manthey Racing	Porsche 911 GT3 R (992.2)	Porsche M97/80 4.2 L Flat-6	91	(Austria) Klaus Bachler	1–2
(Germany) Manthey Racing	Porsche 911 GT3 R (992.2)	Porsche M97/80 4.2 L Flat-6	91	(Germany) Max Moritz	1–2
(Germany) Manthey Racing	Porsche 911 GT3 R (992.2)	Porsche M97/80 4.2 L Flat-6	91	(Austria) Raphael Rennhofer	1–2
(Germany) Manthey Racing	Porsche 911 GT3 R (992.2)	Porsche M97/80 4.2 L Flat-6	92	(Austria) Richard Lietz	1–2
(Germany) Manthey Racing	Porsche 911 GT3 R (992.2)	Porsche M97/80 4.2 L Flat-6	92	(Dominican Republic) Joel Monegro	1–2
(Germany) Manthey Racing	Porsche 911 GT3 R (992.2)	Porsche M97/80 4.2 L Flat-6	92	(Netherlands) Flynt Schuring	1–2
(Italy) DFYNE Racing Team	Lamborghini Temerario GT3	Lamborghini L411 4.0 L Turbo V8	93	(Italy) Giacomo Altoè	1–2
(Italy) DFYNE Racing Team	Lamborghini Temerario GT3	Lamborghini L411 4.0 L Turbo V8	93	(Italy) Leonardo Moncini	1–2
(Italy) DFYNE Racing Team	Lamborghini Temerario GT3	Lamborghini L411 4.0 L Turbo V8	93	(United Kingdom) Oscar Ryndziewicz	1–2
(Italy) DFYNE Racing Team	Lamborghini Temerario GT3	Lamborghini L411 4.0 L Turbo V8	93	(Italy) Giovanni Altoè	TBC

- Afiq Yazid, Alfred Renauer and Alexander West were scheduled to compete for Petrolife Racing Team, Herberth Motorsport and Garage 59 respectively. All three were replaced prior to the start of the season.
- Freddie and Lawrence Tomlinson were scheduled to share 2 Seas Motorsport's No. 33 Mercedes and Isa Al Khalifa and Nick Cristofaro were scheduled to share its No. 46 Mercedes, but the team reshuffled both its lineups prior to the start of the season. Freddie Tomlinson later switched to Garage 59's No. 60 McLaren.

== Results ==
Bold indicates overall winner.

Round	Circuit	Hypercar Winning Team	LMP2 Winning Team	GT3 Winning Team	Ref.
Round	Circuit	Hypercar Winning Drivers	LMP2 Winning Drivers	GT3 Winning Drivers	Ref.
1	(France) Paul Ricard	**(Italy) No. 90 AF Corse**	(Portugal) No. 25 Algarve Pro Racing	No. 62 Team Qatar by Iron Lynx	Report
1	(France) Paul Ricard	**(Denmark) Nicklas Nielsen** **(Argentina) Luis Pérez Companc** **(China) Yifei Ye**	(Denmark) Malthe Jakobsen (Denmark) Michael Jensen (Italy) Enzo Trulli	(Qatar) Abdulla Al-Khelaifi (Germany) Julian Hanses (Belgium) Maxime Martin	Report
2	(France) Paul Ricard	**(Italy) No. 90 AF Corse**	(Germany) No. 11 Proton Competition	(United Kingdom) No. 58 Garage 59	Report
2	(France) Paul Ricard	**(Denmark) Nicklas Nielsen** **(Argentina) Luis Pérez Companc** **(China) Yifei Ye**	(Greece) Georgios Kolovos (France) Victor Martins (France) Charles Milesi	(United States) Dustin Blattner (United Kingdom) Tom Fleming (Germany) Dennis Marschall	Report
3	(Spain) Jerez				Report
4	(Spain) Jerez				Report
5	(Portugal) Algarve				Report
6	(Portugal) Algarve				Report

== Teams Championships ==
=== Hypercar Teams Championship ===
Pos.	Team	Car	LEC (France)		JER (Spain)	POR (Portugal)	Points
1	(Italy) #90 AF Corse	Ferrari 499P	1	**1**			51
2	(Italy) #47 Cetilar Racing	Ferrari 499P	**2**	2			37

Key
Colour	Result
Gold	Race winner
Silver	2nd place
Bronze	3rd place
Green	Points finish
Blue	Non-points finish
Blue	Non-classified finish (NC)
Purple	Did not finish (Ret)
Black	Disqualified (DSQ)
Black	Excluded (EX)
White	Did not start (DNS)
White	Race cancelled (C)
White	Withdrew (WD)
Blank	Did not participate

**Bold** – Pole
Italic – Fastest Lap

=== LMP2 Teams Championship ===
Pos.	Team	Car	LEC (France)		JER (Spain)	POR (Portugal)	Points
1	(Switzerland) #37 CLX Motorsport	Oreca 07	2	2			36
2	(Portugal) #25 Algarve Pro Racing	Oreca 07	1	5			35
3	(Germany) #11 Proton Competition	Oreca 07	9	**1**			28
4	(United Kingdom) #22 United Autosports	Oreca 07	**5**	3			26
5	(Luxembourg) #3 DKR Engineering	Oreca 07	4	8			16
6	(Poland) #43 Inter Europol Competition	Oreca 07	3	14			15
7	(United States) #4 CrowdStrike Racing by APR	Oreca 07	7	4			12
8	(Italy) #83 AF Corse	Oreca 07	10	6			9
9	(Italy) #55 AF Corse	Oreca 07	6	Ret			8
10	(Germany) #66 Proton Competition	Oreca 07	13	7			6
11	(United Kingdom) #24 Nielsen Racing	Oreca 07	8	10			5
12	(United Kingdom) #2 United Autosports	Oreca 07	NC	9			2
13	(Poland) #16 Team Virage	Oreca 07	11	12			0
14	(Portugal) #20 Algarve Pro Racing	Oreca 07	12	11			0
15	(Poland) #34 Inter Europol Competition	Oreca 07	15	13			0
16	(France) #30 Duqueine Team	Oreca 07	14	15			0

=== GT3 Teams Championship ===
Pos.	Team	Car	LEC (France)		JER (Spain)	POR (Portugal)	Points
1	#62 Team Qatar by Iron Lynx	Mercedes-AMG GT3 Evo	1	5			35
2	(United Kingdom) #58 Garage 59	McLaren 720S GT3 Evo	9	1			27
3	(Italy) #50 AF Corse	Ferrari 296 GT3 Evo	6	**2**			27
4	(Germany) #9 GetSpeed	Mercedes-AMG GT3 Evo	**2**	Ret			19
5	(Hong Kong) #88 Craft-Bamboo Iron Lynx	Mercedes-AMG GT3 Evo	3	15			15
6	(United States) #27 Heart of Racing Team	Aston Martin Vantage AMR GT3 Evo	15	3			15
7	(United States) 87 Winward Racing	Mercedes-AMG GT3 Evo	10	4			13
8	(Bahrain) #46 2 Seas Motorsport	Mercedes-AMG GT3 Evo	4	16			12
9	(Germany) #77 Proton Competition	Porsche 911 GT3 R (992.2)	5	17			10
10	(Japan) #57 CarGuy Racing	Ferrari 296 GT3 Evo	Ret	6			8
11	(Malaysia) #7 Petrolife Racing Team	Mercedes-AMG GT3 Evo	7	11			6
12	(Germany) #64 Haupt Racing Team	Ford Mustang GT3 Evo	Ret	7			6
13	(France) #68 Car Blanche by RSL	Aston Martin Vantage AMR GT3 Evo	8	10			5
14	(Belgium) #69 Team WRT	BMW M4 GT3 Evo	17	8			4
15	(United Kingdom) #70 Ecurie Ecosse Blackthorn	Aston Martin Vantage AMR GT3 Evo	NC	9			2
16	(United States) #26 Heart of Racing Team	Aston Martin Vantage AMR GT3 Evo	11	14			0
17	(Germany) #92 Manthey Racing	Porsche 911 GT3 R (992.2)	12	13			0
18	(Bahrain) #33 2 Seas Motorsport	Mercedes-AMG GT3 Evo	NC	12			0
19	(Denmark) #54 High Class Racing	Porsche 911 GT3 R (992.2)	13	18			0
20	(Germany) #91 Manthey Racing	Porsche 911 GT3 R (992.2)	14	Ret			0
21	(Italy) #93 DFYNE Racing Team	Lamborghini Temerario GT3	16	20			0
22	(Germany) #65 Haupt Racing Team	Ford Mustang GT3 Evo	18	Ret			0
23	(Italy) #51 AF Corse	Ferrari 296 GT3 Evo	21	19			0
24	(Germany) #21 Herberth Motorsport	Porsche 911 GT3 R (992.2)	19	Ret			0
25	(Germany) #99 Proton Competition	Porsche 911 GT3 R (992.2)	20	23			0
26	(Japan) #45 Ponos Racing	Ferrari 296 GT3 Evo	23	21			0
27	(United Kingdom) #60 Garage 59	McLaren 720S GT3 Evo	22	Ret			0
28	(Germany) #63 Leipert Motorsport	Lamborghini Temerario GT3	Ret	22			0

== Drivers Championships ==
=== Hypercar Drivers Championship ===
Pos.	Driver	Team	LEC (France)		JER (Spain)	POR (Portugal)	Points
1	(Denmark) Nicklas Nielsen	(Italy) AF Corse	1	**1**			51
1	(Argentina) Luis Pérez Companc	(Italy) AF Corse	1	**1**			51
1	(China) Yifei Ye	(Italy) AF Corse	1	**1**			51
2	(Italy) Antonio Fuoco	(Italy) Cetilar Racing	**2**	2			37
2	(Italy) Nicola Lacorte	(Italy) Cetilar Racing	**2**	2			37
2	(Italy) Roberto Lacorte	(Italy) Cetilar Racing	**2**	2			37

Key
Colour	Result
Gold	Race winner
Silver	2nd place
Bronze	3rd place
Green	Points finish
Blue	Non-points finish
Blue	Non-classified finish (NC)
Purple	Did not finish (Ret)
Black	Disqualified (DSQ)
Black	Excluded (EX)
White	Did not start (DNS)
White	Race cancelled (C)
White	Withdrew (WD)
Blank	Did not participate

**Bold** – Pole
Italic – Fastest Lap

=== LMP2 Drivers Championship ===
Pos.	Driver	Team	LEC (France)		JER (Spain)	POR (Portugal)	Points
1	(France) Adrien Closmenil	(Switzerland) CLX Motorsport	2	2			36
1	(France) Louis Stern	(Switzerland) CLX Motorsport	2	2			36
1	(France) Matthieu Vaxivière	(Switzerland) CLX Motorsport	2	2			36
2	(Denmark) Malthe Jakobsen	(Portugal) Algarve Pro Racing	1	5			35
2	(Denmark) Michael Jensen	(Portugal) Algarve Pro Racing	1	5			35
2	(Italy) Enzo Trulli	(Portugal) Algarve Pro Racing	1	5			35
3	(Greece) Georgios Kolovos	(Germany) Proton Competition	9	**1**			28
3	(France) Victor Martins	(Germany) Proton Competition	9	**1**			28
3	(France) Charles Milesi	(Germany) Proton Competition	9	**1**			28
4	(Mexico) Ian Aguilera	(United Kingdom) United Autosports	**5**	3			26
4	(United States) Sting Ray Robb	(United Kingdom) United Autosports	**5**	3			26
4	(Italy) Giorgio Roda	(United Kingdom) United Autosports	**5**	3			26
5	(Switzerland) Louis Delétraz	(United States) CrowdStrike Racing by APR	7	4			18
5	(Germany) Laurin Heinrich	(United States) CrowdStrike Racing by APR	7	4			18
5	(United States) George Kurtz	(United States) CrowdStrike Racing by APR	7	4			18
6	(Germany) Laurents Hörr	(Luxembourg) DKR Engineering	4	8			16
6	(Germany) Hugo Schwarze	(Luxembourg) DKR Engineering	4	8			16
6	(Belgium) Tom Van Rompuy	(Luxembourg) DKR Engineering	4	8			16
7	(Germany) Torsten Kratz	(Poland) Inter Europol Competition	3	14			15
7	(United Kingdom) Cian Shields	(Poland) Inter Europol Competition	3	14			15
7	(United Kingdom) Nick Yelloly	(Poland) Inter Europol Competition	3	14			15
8	(France) Julien Andlauer	(Italy) AF Corse	10	4			9
8	(United States) Jeremy Clarke	(Italy) AF Corse	10	4			9
8	(Argentina) Nico Varrone	(Italy) AF Corse	10	4			9
9	(Lebanon) Alex Demirdjian	(Italy) AF Corse	6	Ret			8
9	(Australia) Jack Doohan	(Italy) AF Corse	6	Ret			8
9	(United Kingdom) Phil Hanson	(Italy) AF Corse	6	Ret			8
10	(Austria) Horst Felbermayr Jr.	(Germany) Proton Competition	13	7			6
10	(Austria) Horst Felix Felbermayr	(Germany) Proton Competition	13	7			6
10	(Austria) Ferdinand Habsburg	(Germany) Proton Competition	13	7			6
11	(United States) Max Garcia	(United Kingdom) Nielsen Racing	8	10			5
11	(United States) Scott Huffaker	(United Kingdom) Nielsen Racing	8	10			5
11	(United States) Steven Thomas	(United Kingdom) Nielsen Racing	8	10			5
12	(Canada) Phil Fayer	(United Kingdom) United Autosports	NC	9			2
12	(Denmark) Mikkel Jensen	(United Kingdom) United Autosports	NC	9			2
12	(New Zealand) Hunter McElrea	(United Kingdom) United Autosports	NC	9			2
13	(Republic of Ireland) Jonathan Browne	(Poland) Team Virage	11	12			0
13	(Algeria) Leo Robinson	(Poland) Team Virage	11	12			0
13	(Poland) Jacek Zielonka	(Poland) Team Virage	11	12			0
14	(Denmark) Theodor Jensen	(Portugal) Algarve Pro Racing	12	11			0
14	(Denmark) Jens Reno Møller	(Portugal) Algarve Pro Racing	12	11			0
14	(Austria) Charlie Wurz	(Portugal) Algarve Pro Racing	12	11			0
15	(Canada) Antoine Comeau	(Poland) Inter Europol Competition	15	13			0
15	(United States) Bijoy Garg	(Poland) Inter Europol Competition	15	13			0
15	(Netherlands) Niels Koolen	(Poland) Inter Europol Competition	15	13			0
16	(Australia) Gianmarco Pradel	(France) Duqueine Team	14	15			0
16	(Sweden) August Raber	(France) Duqueine Team	14	15			0
16	(Estonia) Antti Rammo	(France) Duqueine Team	14	15			0

=== GT3 Drivers Championship ===
Pos.	Driver	Team	LEC (France)		JER (Spain)	POR (Portugal)	Points
1	(Qatar) Abdulla Al-Khelaifi	Team Qatar by Iron Lynx	1	5			35
1	(Germany) Julian Hanses	Team Qatar by Iron Lynx	1	5			35
1	(Belgium) Maxime Martin	Team Qatar by Iron Lynx	1	5			35
2	(Republic of Ireland) Peter Dempsey	(Italy) AF Corse	5	**2**			29
2	(Spain) Rafael Durán	(Italy) AF Corse	5	**2**			29
2	(South Africa) David Perel	(Italy) AF Corse	5	**2**			29
3	(United States) Dustin Blattner	(United Kingdom) Garage 59	18	1			25
3	(United Kingdom) Tom Fleming	(United Kingdom) Garage 59	18	1			25
3	(Germany) Dennis Marschall	(United Kingdom) Garage 59	18	1			25
4	(Zimbabwe) Ameerh Naran	(Hong Kong) Craft-Bamboo Iron Lynx	2	15			18
4	(Denmark) Mikkel Gaarde Pedersen	(Hong Kong) Craft-Bamboo Iron Lynx	2	15			18
4	(Germany) Luca Stolz	(Hong Kong) Craft-Bamboo Iron Lynx	2	15			18
5	(Germany) Marvin Dienst	(United States) Winward Racing	8	4			16
5	(Italy) Gabriele Piana	(United States) Winward Racing	8	4			16
5	(Russia) Rinat Salikhov	(United States) Winward Racing	8	4			16
6	(Italy) Mattia Drudi	(United States) Heart of Racing Team	13	3			15
6	(United Kingdom) Ian James	(United States) Heart of Racing Team	13	3			15
6	(Canada) Zacharie Robichon	(United States) Heart of Racing Team	13	3			15
7	(United Kingdom) Charles Dawson	(Bahrain) 2 Seas Motorsport	3	16			15
7	(United Kingdom) Kiern Jewiss	(Bahrain) 2 Seas Motorsport	3	16			15
7	(Australia) Christian Mansell	(Bahrain) 2 Seas Motorsport	3	16			15
8	(Netherlands) Robert de Haan	(Germany) Proton Competition	4	17			12
8	(United States) Matt Kurzejewski	(Germany) Proton Competition	4	17			12
8	(Germany) Lenny Ried	(Germany) Proton Competition	4	17			12
9	(Denmark) Simon Birch	(Malaysia) PetroLife Racing Team	6	11			8
9	(Denmark) Frederik Schandorff	(Malaysia) PetroLife Racing Team	6	11			8
9	(France) Stéphane Tribaudini	(Malaysia) PetroLife Racing Team	6	11			8
10	(France) Mathys Jaubert	(Japan) CarGuy Racing	Ret	6			8
10	(Japan) Takeshi Kimura	(Japan) CarGuy Racing	Ret	6			8
10	(France) Esteban Masson	(Japan) CarGuy Racing	Ret	6			8
11	(United Kingdom) Jonny Edgar	(France) Car Blanche by RSL	7	10			7
11	(France) Valentin Hasse-Clot	(France) Car Blanche by RSL	7	10			7
11	(France) Arnold Robin	(France) Car Blanche by RSL	7	10			7
12	(India) Arjun Maini	(Germany) Haupt Racing Team	Ret	7			6
12	(United States) Michael Tosi	(Germany) Haupt Racing Team	Ret	7			6
12	(Germany) Finn Wiebelhaus	(Germany) Haupt Racing Team	Ret	7			6
13	(Germany) Max Hesse	(Belgium) Team WRT	16	8			4
13	(United States) Anthony McIntosh	(Belgium) Team WRT	16	8			4
13	(Canada) Parker Thompson	(Belgium) Team WRT	16	8			4
14	(Brazil) Eduardo Barrichello	(United States) Heart of Racing Team	9	14			2
14	(Canada) Roman De Angelis	(United States) Heart of Racing Team	9	14			2
14	(United States) Gray Newell	(United States) Heart of Racing Team	9	14			2
15	(United Kingdom) Jonny Adam	(United Kingdom) Ecurie Ecosse Blackthorn	NC	9			2
15	(Belgium) Kobe Pauwels	(United Kingdom) Ecurie Ecosse Blackthorn	NC	9			2
15	(Italy) Giacomo Petrobelli	(United Kingdom) Ecurie Ecosse Blackthorn	NC	9			2
16	(Austria) Richard Lietz	(Germany) Manthey Racing	10	13			1
16	(Panama) Joel Monegro	(Germany) Manthey Racing	10	13			1
16	(Netherlands) Flynt Schuring	(Germany) Manthey Racing	10	13			1
17	(United States) Anthony Bartone	(Germany) GetSpeed	**15**	Ret			1
17	(Luxembourg) Steve Jans	(Germany) GetSpeed	**15**	Ret			1
17	(Germany) Fabian Schiller	(Germany) GetSpeed	**15**	Ret			1
18	(Austria) Klaus Bachler	(Germany) Manthey Racing	11	Ret			
18	(Germany) Max Moritz	(Germany) Manthey Racing	11	Ret			
18	(Austria) Raphael Rennhofer	(Germany) Manthey Racing	11	Ret			
19	(Denmark) Anders Fjordbach	(Denmark) High Class Racing	12	18			0
19	(Germany) Thomas Kiefer	(Denmark) High Class Racing	12	18			0
19	(Denmark) Philip Lindberg	(Denmark) High Class Racing	12	18			0
20	(Israel) Guy Albag	(Bahrain) 2 Seas Motorsport	NC	12			0
20	(United Kingdom) Darren Leung	(Bahrain) 2 Seas Motorsport	NC	12			0
20	(United Kingdom) Chris Lulham	(Bahrain) 2 Seas Motorsport	NC	12			0
21	(Italy) Giacomo Altoè	(Italy) DFYNE Racing Team	16	20			0
21	(Italy) Leonardo Moncini	(Italy) DFYNE Racing Team	16	20			0
21	(United Kingdom) Oscar Ryndziewicz	(Italy) DFYNE Racing Team	16	20			0
22	(Germany) Hubert Haupt	(Germany) Haupt Racing Team	17	Ret			0
22	(Switzerland) Fabio Scherer	(Germany) Haupt Racing Team	17	Ret			0
22	(Germany) David Schumacher	(Germany) Haupt Racing Team	17	Ret			0
23	(Belgium) Jef Machiels	(Italy) AF Corse	21	19			0
23	(Puerto Rico) Francesco Piovanetti	(Italy) AF Corse	21	19			0
23	(Italy) Alessio Rovera	(Italy) AF Corse	21	19			0
24	(Germany) Ralf Bohn	(Germany) Herberth Motorsport	19	Ret			0
24	(France) Mathieu Jaminet	(Germany) Herberth Motorsport	19	Ret			0
24	(Australia) Tom Sargent	(Germany) Herberth Motorsport	19	Ret			0
25	(United Kingdom) Harry King	(Germany) Proton Competition	20	23			0
25	(Germany) Christian Ried	(Germany) Proton Competition	20	23			0
25	(Germany) Jonas Ried	(Germany) Proton Competition	20	23			0
26	(Japan) Tadasuke Makino	(Japan) Ponos Racing	23	21			0
26	(Japan) Takuro Shinohara	(Japan) Ponos Racing	23	21			0
26	(Japan) Yorikatsu Tsujiko	(Japan) Ponos Racing	23	21			0
27	(United States) Lance Bergstein	(Germany) Leipert Motorsport	Ret	22			0
27	(New Zealand) Brendon Leitch	(Germany) Leipert Motorsport	Ret	22			0
27	(Australia) Nicolas Stati	(Germany) Leipert Motorsport	Ret	22			0
28	(United Kingdom) Joseph Loake	(United Kingdom) Garage 59	22	Ret			0
28	(Italy) Marco Pulcini	(United Kingdom) Garage 59	22	Ret			0
28	(United Kingdom) Freddie Tomlinson	(United Kingdom) Garage 59	22	Ret			0
