= 2026 12 Hours of Sebring =

74th 12 Hours of Sebring race

Sebring International Raceway

The 2026 12 Hours of Sebring (formally known as the 74th Mobil 1 Twelve Hours of Sebring) was an endurance sports car race that was held at Sebring International Raceway near Sebring, Florida, from 18 to 21 March 2026. It was the second round of both the 2026 IMSA SportsCar Championship and the Michelin Endurance Cup.

== Background ==
=== Preview ===
International Motor Sports Association (IMSA) president John Doonan confirmed the race was a part of the 2026 IMSA SportsCar Championship (IMSA SCC) in March 2025. It was the thirteenth consecutive year it will be a part of the IMSA SCC, and the 74th 12 Hours of Sebring. The 12 Hours of Sebring was the second of eleven scheduled sports car endurance races by IMSA, and the second of five races on the Michelin Endurance Cup (MEC). The race took place at the 17-turn 3.741-mile (6.021 km) Sebring International Raceway in Sebring, Florida on March 21, 2026.

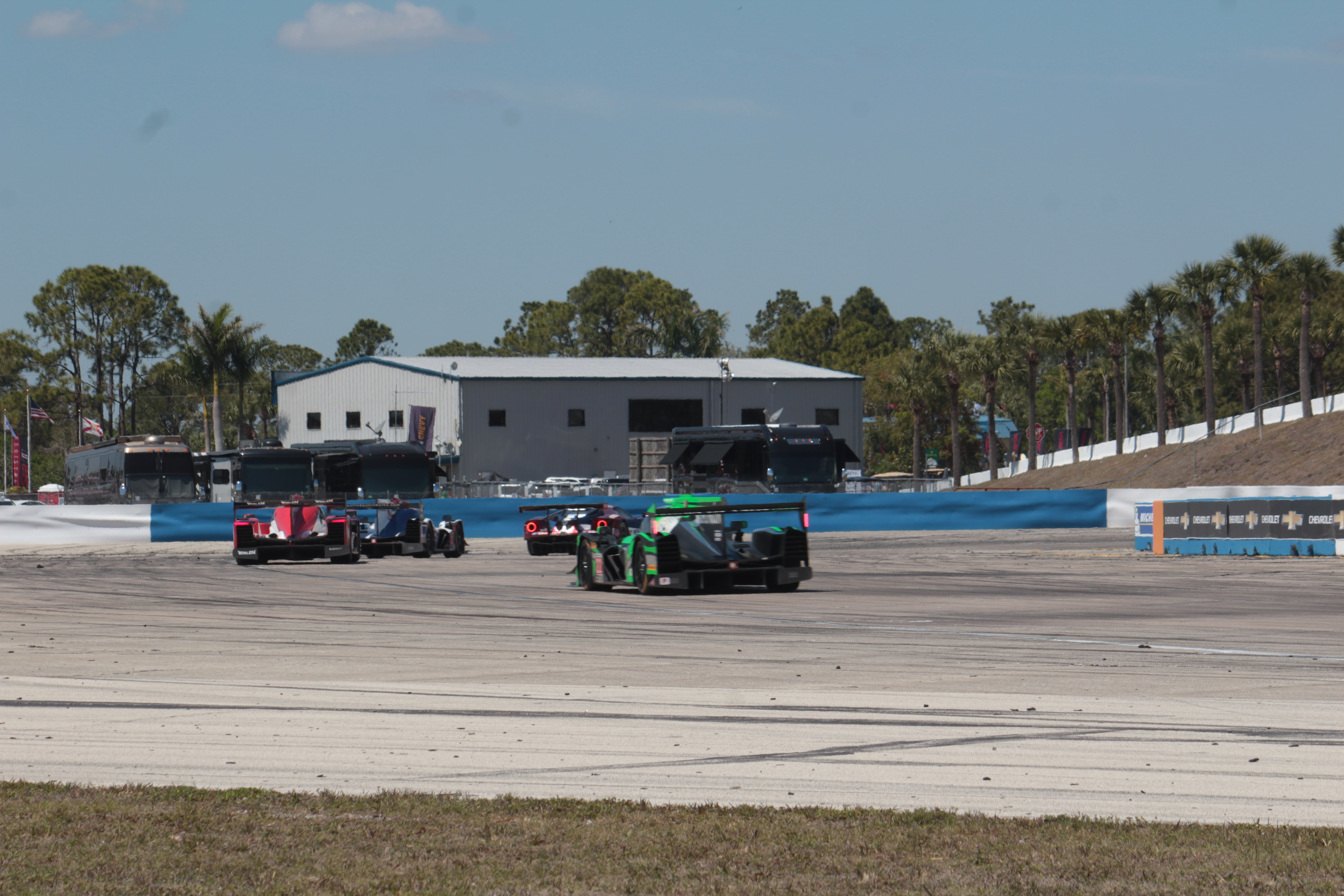
Sebring International Raceway, where the race will be held.

The race saw the global debut of the Lamborghini Temerario GT3, the replacement for the previous Huracán model.

=== Standings before the race ===
Before the race, Julien Andlauer, Laurin Heinrich, and Felipe Nasr lead the GTP Drivers' Championship with 380 points. In LMP2, Malthe Jakobsen, George Kurtz, Alex Quinn, and Toby Sowery lead the Drivers' Championship with 373 points. The GTD Pro Drivers' Championship is being led by Connor De Phillippi, Dan Harper, Max Hesse, and Neil Verhagen with 366 points. With 382 points, Lucas Auer, Indy Dontje, Philip Ellis, and Trent Hindman are leading the GTD Drivers' Championship. Porsche, BMW, and Mercedes-AMG are leading their respective Manufactures' Championships while Porsche Penske Motorsport, CrowdStrike Racing by APR, Paul Miller Racing, and Winward Racing each lead their own Teams' Championships.

== Entry list ==
No.	Entrant	Car	Driver 1	Driver 2	Driver 3
GTP (Grand Touring Prototype) (11 entries)
5	(United States) JDC–Miller MotorSports	Porsche 963	(United States) Kaylen Frederick	(Netherlands) Tijmen van der Helm	(Chile) Nico Pino
6	(Germany) Porsche Penske Motorsport	Porsche 963	(Australia) Matt Campbell	(France) Kévin Estre	(Belgium) Laurens Vanthoor
7	(Germany) Porsche Penske Motorsport	Porsche 963	(France) Julien Andlauer	(Germany) Laurin Heinrich	(Brazil) Felipe Nasr
10	(United States) Cadillac Wayne Taylor Racing	Cadillac V-Series.R	(Portugal) Filipe Albuquerque	(United Kingdom) Will Stevens	(United States) Ricky Taylor
23	(United States) Aston Martin THOR Team	Aston Martin Valkyrie	(Canada) Roman De Angelis	(United Kingdom) Ross Gunn	(Spain) Alex Riberas
24	(Belgium) BMW M Team WRT	BMW M Hybrid V8	(Netherlands) Robin Frijns	(South Africa) Sheldon van der Linde	(Belgium) Dries Vanthoor
25	(Belgium) BMW M Team WRT	BMW M Hybrid V8	(Austria) Philipp Eng	(Denmark) Kevin Magnussen	(Germany) Marco Wittmann
31	(United States) Cadillac Whelen	Cadillac V-Series.R	(United Kingdom) Jack Aitken	(New Zealand) Earl Bamber	(Denmark) Frederik Vesti
40	(United States) Cadillac Wayne Taylor Racing	Cadillac V-Series.R	(Switzerland) Louis Delétraz	(United States) Colton Herta	(United States) Jordan Taylor
60	(United States) Acura Meyer Shank Racing with Curb-Agajanian	Acura ARX-06	(United Kingdom) Tom Blomqvist	(United States) Colin Braun	(New Zealand) Scott Dixon
93	(United States) Acura Meyer Shank Racing with Curb-Agajanian	Acura ARX-06	(Spain) Álex Palou	(United Kingdom) Nick Yelloly	(Netherlands) Renger van der Zande
LMP2 (Le Mans Prototype 2) (12 entries)
04	(Portugal) CrowdStrike Racing by APR	Oreca 07-Gibson	(United States) George Kurtz	(United Kingdom) Alex Quinn	(United Kingdom) Toby Sowery
2	(United States) United Autosports USA	Oreca 07-Gibson	(Canada) Phil Fayer	(Denmark) Mikkel Jensen	(New Zealand) Hunter McElrea
8	(Canada) Tower Motorsports	Oreca 07-Gibson	(Mexico) Sebastián Álvarez	(Canada) John Farano	(France) Tristan Vautier
11	(France) TDS Racing	Oreca 07-Gibson	(Denmark) David Heinemeier Hansson	(Canada) Tobias Lütke	(France) Charles Milesi
18	(United States) Era Motorsport	Oreca 07-Gibson	(United States) Jacob Abel	(Austria) Ferdinand Habsburg	(United States) Naveen Rao
22	(United States) United Autosports USA	Oreca 07-Gibson	(United Kingdom) Paul di Resta	(United States) Dan Goldburg	(Sweden) Rasmus Lindh
37	(United States) Intersport Racing	Oreca 07-Gibson	(United States) Jon Field	(United Kingdom) Oliver Jarvis	(United States) Seth Lucas
43	(Poland) Inter Europol Competition	Oreca 07-Gibson	(United States) Jeremy Clarke	(France) Tom Dillmann	(United States) Bijoy Garg
52	(United States) Bryan Herta Autosport with PR1/Mathiasen	Oreca 07-Gibson	(Canada) Misha Goikhberg	(Canada) Parker Thompson	(United Kingdom) Harry Tincknell
73	(United States) Pratt Miller Motorsports	Oreca 07-Gibson	(Canada) Chris Cumming	(Portugal) Manuel Espírito Santo	(Brazil) Pietro Fittipaldi
79	(United States) JDC–Miller MotorSports	Oreca 07-Gibson	(Australia) Josh Burdon	(United Kingdom) Sennan Fielding	(United States) Gerry Kraut
99	(United States) AO Racing	Oreca 07-Gibson	(United States) Dane Cameron	(United Kingdom) Jonny Edgar	(United States) P. J. Hyett
GTD Pro (GT Daytona Pro) (13 entries)
033	(United States) Triarsi Competizione	Ferrari 296 GT3 Evo	(Italy) Riccardo Agostini	(United Kingdom) James Calado	(Spain) Miguel Molina
1	(United States) Paul Miller Racing	BMW M4 GT3 Evo	(United States) Connor De Phillippi	(Germany) Max Hesse	(United States) Neil Verhagen
3	(United States) Corvette Racing by Pratt Miller Motorsports	Chevrolet Corvette Z06 GT3.R	(Spain) Antonio García	(Germany) Marvin Kirchhöfer	(United Kingdom) Alexander Sims
4	(United States) Corvette Racing by Pratt Miller Motorsports	Chevrolet Corvette Z06 GT3.R	(Netherlands) Nicky Catsburg	(United States) Tommy Milner	(Argentina) Nico Varrone
9	(Canada) Pfaff Motorsports	Lamborghini Temerario GT3	(Italy) Andrea Caldarelli	(United Kingdom) Sandy Mitchell	(France) Franck Perera
14	(United States) Vasser Sullivan Racing	Lexus RC F GT3	(United Kingdom) Ben Barnicoat	(United Kingdom) Jack Hawksworth	(United States) Kyle Kirkwood
48	(United States) Winward Racing	Mercedes-AMG GT3 Evo	(United States) Jason Hart	(United States) Scott Noble	(Germany) Luca Stolz
59	(United States) RLL Team McLaren	McLaren 720S GT3 Evo	(United States) Max Esterson	(United States) Nikita Johnson	(United Kingdom) Dean MacDonald
62	(United States) Risi Competizione	Ferrari 296 GT3 Evo	(Italy) Alessandro Pier Guidi	(Italy) Davide Rigon	(Brazil) Daniel Serra
64	(Canada) Ford Multimatic Motorsports	Ford Mustang GT3 Evo	(United Kingdom) Ben Barker	(Norway) Dennis Olsen	(Germany) Mike Rockenfeller
65	(Canada) Ford Multimatic Motorsports	Ford Mustang GT3 Evo	(Germany) Christopher Mies	(United Kingdom) Sebastian Priaulx	(Belgium) Frédéric Vervisch
77	(United States) AO Racing	Porsche 911 GT3 R (992.2)	(United Kingdom) Harry King	(Belgium) Alessio Picariello	(United Kingdom) Nick Tandy
911	(Germany) Manthey Racing	Porsche 911 GT3 R (992.2)	(Austria) Klaus Bachler	(Switzerland) Ricardo Feller	(Austria) Thomas Preining
GTD (GT Daytona) (19 entries)
023	(United States) Triarsi Competizione	Ferrari 296 GT3 Evo	(United States) Kenton Koch	(United States) Robert Megennis	(United States) Onofrio Triarsi
12	(United States) Vasser Sullivan Racing	Lexus RC F GT3	(United States) Frankie Montecalvo	(Denmark) Benjamin Pedersen	(United States) Aaron Telitz
13	(Canada) 13 Autosport	Chevrolet Corvette Z06 GT3.R	(United Kingdom) Matt Bell	(Canada) Orey Fidani	(Germany) Lars Kern
16	(United States) Myers Riley Motorsports	Ford Mustang GT3 Evo	(United States) Jenson Altzman	(Brazil) Felipe Fraga	(United States) Sheena Monk
19	(United States) van der Steur Racing	Aston Martin Vantage AMR GT3 Evo	(France) Sébastien Baud	(France) Valentin Hasse-Clot	(United States) Rory van der Steur
21	(Italy) AF Corse USA	Ferrari 296 GT3 Evo	(Italy) Antonio Fuoco	(United Kingdom) Simon Mann	(France) Lilou Wadoux
27	(United States) Heart of Racing Team	Aston Martin Vantage AMR GT3 Evo	(Brazil) Eduardo Barrichello	(United Kingdom) Tom Gamble	(Canada) Zacharie Robichon
28	(United States) RS1	Porsche 911 GT3 R (992.2)	(Belgium) Jan Heylen	(United States) Dillon Machavern	(United States) Spencer Pumpelly
34	(United States) Conquest Racing	Ferrari 296 GT3 Evo	(Spain) Albert Costa	(United States) Manny Franco	(Italy) Lorenzo Patrese
36	(United States) DXDT Racing	Chevrolet Corvette Z06 GT3.R	(Republic of Ireland) Charlie Eastwood	(United States) Mason Filippi	(Turkey) Salih Yoluç
45	(United States) Wayne Taylor Racing	Lamborghini Huracán GT3 Evo 2	(United States) Graham Doyle	(Costa Rica) Danny Formal	(United States) Trent Hindman
57	(United States) Winward Racing	Mercedes-AMG GT3 Evo	(Netherlands) Indy Dontje	(Switzerland) Philip Ellis	(United States) Russell Ward
66	(United States) Gradient Racing	Ford Mustang GT3 Evo	(United Kingdom) Till Bechtolsheimer	(United States) Joey Hand	(United States) Jake Walker
70	(United Kingdom) Inception Racing	Ferrari 296 GT3 Evo	(United States) Brendan Iribe	(United Kingdom) Ollie Millroy	(Denmark) Frederik Schandorff
80	(United States) Lone Star Racing	Mercedes-AMG GT3 Evo	(Australia) Scott Andrews	(Netherlands) Lin Hodenius	(Republic of Ireland) James Roe
81	(United States) DragonSpeed	Chevrolet Corvette Z06 GT3.R	(Italy) Giacomo Altoè	(Sweden) Henrik Hedman	(United Kingdom) Casper Stevenson
96	(United States) Turner Motorsport	BMW M4 GT3 Evo	(United States) Robby Foley	(United States) Patrick Gallagher	(United States) Francis Selldorff
120	(United States) Wright Motorsports	Porsche 911 GT3 R (992.2)	(United States) Adam Adelson	(United Kingdom) Callum Ilott	(Australia) Tom Sargent
912	(Germany) Manthey 1st Phorm	Porsche 911 GT3 R (992.2)	(United States) Ryan Hardwick	(Italy) Riccardo Pera	(Netherlands) Morris Schuring

== Qualifying ==
Friday's afternoon qualifying was broken into four sessions, with one session for the GTP, LMP2, GTD Pro, and GTD classes each. The rules dictated that all teams nominated a driver to qualify their cars, with the Pro-Am LMP2 class requiring a Bronze rated driver to qualify the car. The competitors' fastest lap times determined the starting order. IMSA then arranged the grid to put GTPs ahead of the LMP2, GTD Pro, and GTD cars.

=== Qualifying results ===
Pole positions in each class are indicated in bold and with ‡.

Pos.	Class	No.	Entry	Driver	Time	Gap	Grid
1	**GTP**	**31**	**(United States) Cadillac Whelen**	**(United Kingdom) Jack Aitken**	**1:46.153**	—	1‡
2	GTP	60	(United States) Acura Meyer Shank Racing with Curb-Agajanian	(United Kingdom) Tom Blomqvist	1:46.262	+0.109	2
3	GTP	10	(United States) Cadillac Wayne Taylor Racing	(Portugal) Filipe Albuquerque	1:46.298	+0.145	3
4	GTP	6	(Germany) Porsche Penske Motorsport	(France) Kévin Estre	1:46.395	+0.242	4
5	GTP	40	(United States) Cadillac Wayne Taylor Racing	(Switzerland) Louis Delétraz	1:46.421	+0.268	5
6	GTP	7	(Germany) Porsche Penske Motorsport	(Brazil) Felipe Nasr	1:46.681	+0.528	6
7	GTP	5	(United States) JDC–Miller MotorSports	(United States) Kaylen Frederick	1:46.722	+0.569	7
8	GTP	24	(Belgium) BMW M Team WRT	(South Africa) Sheldon van der Linde	1:46.878	+0.725	8
9	GTP	93	(United States) Acura Meyer Shank Racing with Curb-Agajanian	(Netherlands) Renger van der Zande	1:47.112	+0.959	9
10	GTP	23	(United States) Aston Martin THOR Team	(United Kingdom) Ross Gunn	1:47.363	+1.210	10
11	GTP	25	(Belgium) BMW M Team WRT	(Austria) Philipp Eng	1:47.449	+1.296	11
12	**LMP2**	**52**	**(United States) Bryan Herta Autosport with PR1/Mathiasen**	**(Canada) Misha Goikhberg**	**1:51.182**	**+5.029**	12‡
13	LMP2	22	(United States) United Autosports USA	(United States) Dan Goldburg	1:51.255	+5.102	13
14	LMP2	43	(Poland) Inter Europol Competition	(United States) Jeremy Clarke	1:51.260	+5.107	14
15	LMP2	99	(United States) AO Racing	(United States) P. J. Hyett	1:51.322	+5.169	15
16	LMP2	04	(Portugal) CrowdStrike Racing by APR	(United States) George Kurtz	1:51.689	+5.536	16
17	LMP2	73	(United States) Pratt Miller Motorsports	(Canada) Chris Cumming	1:53.342	+7.189	17
18	LMP2	11	(France) TDS Racing	(Canada) Tobias Lütke	1:53.374	+7.221	18
19	LMP2	2	(United States) United Autosports USA	(Canada) Phil Fayer	1:53.557	+7.404	19
20	LMP2	8	(Canada) Tower Motorsports	(Canada) John Farano	1:53.632	+7.479	20
21	LMP2	18	(United States) Era Motorsport	(United States) Naveen Rao	1:53.988	+7.835	21
22	LMP2	37	(United States) Intersport Racing	(United States) Jon Field	1:54.090	+7.937	22
23	**GTD Pro**	**14**	**(United States) Vasser Sullivan Racing**	**(United Kingdom) Jack Hawksworth**	**1:58.480**	**+12.327**	24‡
24	LMP2	79	(United States) JDC–Miller MotorSports	(United States) Gerry Kraut	1:58.542	+12.389	23
25	GTD Pro	48	(United States) Winward Racing	(Germany) Luca Stolz	1:58.769	+12.616	36^{1}
26	**GTD**	**27**	**(United States) Heart of Racing Team**	**(Brazil) Eduardo Barrichello**	**1:58.856**	**+12.703**	37‡
27	GTD Pro	1	(United States) Paul Miller Racing	(United States) Neil Verhagen	1:58.886	+12.733	25
28	GTD	57	(United States) Winward Racing	(Switzerland) Philip Ellis	1:58.980	+12.827	38
29	GTD Pro	911	(Germany) Manthey Racing	(Switzerland) Ricardo Feller	1:59.040	+12.887	26
30	GTD	96	(United States) Turner Motorsport	(United States) Robby Foley	1:59.040	+12.987	39
31	GTD Pro	59	(United States) RLL Team McLaren	(United Kingdom) Dean MacDonald	1:59.216	+10.063	27
32	GTD	80	(United States) Lone Star Racing	(Australia) Scott Andrews	1:59.292	+13.139	40
33	GTD Pro	3	(United States) Corvette Racing by Pratt Miller Motorsports	(Spain) Antonio García	1:59.295	+13.142	28
34	GTD	21	(Italy) AF Corse USA	(Italy) Antonio Fuoco	1:59.319	+13.166	41
35	GTD Pro	62	(United States) Risi Competizione	(Brazil) Daniel Serra	1:59.427	+13.274	29
36	GTD Pro	4	(United States) Corvette Racing by Pratt Miller Motorsports	(United States) Tommy Milner	1:59.465	+13.312	30
37	GTD Pro	77	(United States) AO Racing	(United Kingdom) Harry King	1:59.544	+13.391	31
38	GTD	12	(United States) Vasser Sullivan Racing	(Denmark) Benjamin Pedersen	1:59.556	+13.403	42
39	GTD	120	(United States) Wright Motorsports	(Australia) Tom Sargent	1:59.680	+13.527	43
40	GTD	19	(United States) van der Steur Racing	(France) Valentin Hasse-Clot	1:59.798	+13.645	44
41	GTD Pro	033	(United States) Triarsi Competizione	(Spain) Miguel Molina	1:59.805	+13.652	32
42	GTD Pro	65	(Canada) Ford Multimatic Motorsports	(Germany) Christopher Mies	1:59.884	+13.731	33
43	GTD Pro	64	(Canada) Ford Multimatic Motorsports	(United Kingdom) Ben Barker	1:59.939	+13.786	34
44	GTD Pro	9	(Canada) Pfaff Motorsports	(Italy) Andrea Caldarelli	2:00.062	+13.909	35
45	GTD	023	(United States) Triarsi Competizione	(United States) Onofrio Triarsi	2:00.467	+14.314	45
46	GTD	36	(United States) DXDT Racing	(Turkey) Salih Yoluç	2:00.974	+14.821	46
47	GTD	45	(United States) Wayne Taylor Racing	(United States) Trent Hindman	2:01.377	+15.224	47
48	GTD	70	(United Kingdom) Inception Racing	(United States) Brendan Iribe	2:01.405	+15.252	48
49	GTD	66	(United States) Gradient Racing	(United States) Joey Hand	2:01.410	+15.257	55^{2}
50	GTD	28	(United States) RS1	(United States) Dillon Machavern	2:01.859	+15.706	49
51	GTD	34	(United States) Conquest Racing	(United States) Manny Franco	2:01.889	+15.736	50
52	GTD	16	(United States) Myers Riley Motorsports	(United States) Sheena Monk	2:02.093	+15.940	51
53	GTD	912	(Germany) Manthey 1st Phorm	(United States) Ryan Hardwick	2:02.195	+16.042	52
54	GTD	13	(Canada) 13 Autosport	(Canada) Orey Fidani	2:02.298	+16.145	53
55	GTD	81	(United States) DragonSpeed	(Sweden) Henrik Hedman	2:03.781	+17.628	54
Sources:

- ^{1} The No. 48 Winward entry had all qualifying times disallowed and was moved to the rear of the GTD Pro field after failing post-qualifying technical inspection regarding rules for minimum ground clearance.
- ^{2} The No. 66 Gradient Racing entry was moved to the rear of the GTD field as per Article 40.2.3 of the Sporting regulations (Change of starting driver).

== Race ==
=== Race results ===
Class winners are denoted in bold and with ‡.

Pos	Class	No	Team	Drivers	Chassis	Laps	Time/Retired
Pos	Class	No	Team	Drivers	Engine	Laps	Time/Retired
1	**GTP**	**7**	**(Germany) Porsche Penske Motorsport**	**(France) Julien Andlauer (Germany) Laurin Heinrich (Brazil) Felipe Nasr**	**Porsche 963**	**343**	**12:01:48.652‡**
1	**GTP**	**7**	**(Germany) Porsche Penske Motorsport**	**(France) Julien Andlauer (Germany) Laurin Heinrich (Brazil) Felipe Nasr**	**Porsche 9RD 4.6 L Turbo V8**	**343**	**12:01:48.652‡**
2	GTP	6	(Germany) Porsche Penske Motorsport	(Australia) Matt Campbell (France) Kévin Estre (Belgium) Laurens Vanthoor	Porsche 963	343	+1.515
2	GTP	6	(Germany) Porsche Penske Motorsport	(Australia) Matt Campbell (France) Kévin Estre (Belgium) Laurens Vanthoor	Porsche 9RD 4.6 L Turbo V8	343	+1.515
3	GTP	31	(United States) Cadillac Whelen	(United Kingdom) Jack Aitken (New Zealand) Earl Bamber (Denmark) Frederik Vesti	Cadillac V-Series.R	343	+10.377
3	GTP	31	(United States) Cadillac Whelen	(United Kingdom) Jack Aitken (New Zealand) Earl Bamber (Denmark) Frederik Vesti	Cadillac LMC55R 5.5 L V8	343	+10.377
4	GTP	60	(United States) Meyer Shank Racing with Curb-Agajanian	(United Kingdom) Tom Blomqvist (United States) Colin Braun (New Zealand) Scott Dixon	Acura ARX-06	343	+11.104
4	GTP	60	(United States) Meyer Shank Racing with Curb-Agajanian	(United Kingdom) Tom Blomqvist (United States) Colin Braun (New Zealand) Scott Dixon	Acura AR24e 2.4 L Turbo V6	343	+11.104
5	GTP	24	(Belgium) BMW M Team WRT	(Netherlands) Robin Frijns (South Africa) Sheldon van der Linde (Belgium) Dries Vanthoor	BMW M Hybrid V8	343	+13.723
5	GTP	24	(Belgium) BMW M Team WRT	(Netherlands) Robin Frijns (South Africa) Sheldon van der Linde (Belgium) Dries Vanthoor	BMW P66/3 4.0 L Turbo V8	343	+13.723
6	GTP	93	(United States) Meyer Shank Racing with Curb-Agajanian	(Spain) Álex Palou (Netherlands) Renger van der Zande (United Kingdom) Nick Yelloly	Acura ARX-06	343	+14.819
6	GTP	93	(United States) Meyer Shank Racing with Curb-Agajanian	(Spain) Álex Palou (Netherlands) Renger van der Zande (United Kingdom) Nick Yelloly	Acura AR24e 2.4 L Turbo V6	343	+14.819
7	GTP	40	(United States) Cadillac Wayne Taylor Racing	(Switzerland) Louis Delétraz (United States) Colton Herta (United States) Jordan Taylor	Cadillac V-Series.R	343	+16.642
7	GTP	40	(United States) Cadillac Wayne Taylor Racing	(Switzerland) Louis Delétraz (United States) Colton Herta (United States) Jordan Taylor	Cadillac LMC55R 5.5 L V8	343	+16.642
8	GTP	5	(United States) JDC-Miller MotorSports	(United States) Kaylen Frederick (Chile) Nico Pino (Netherlands) Tijmen van der Helm	Porsche 963	343	+24.739
8	GTP	5	(United States) JDC-Miller MotorSports	(United States) Kaylen Frederick (Chile) Nico Pino (Netherlands) Tijmen van der Helm	Porsche 9RD 4.6 L Turbo V8	343	+24.739
9	**LMP2**	**2**	**(United States) United Autosports USA**	**(Canada) Phil Fayer (Denmark) Mikkel Jensen (New Zealand) Hunter McElrea**	**Oreca 07**	**338**	**+5 Laps‡**
9	**LMP2**	**2**	**(United States) United Autosports USA**	**(Canada) Phil Fayer (Denmark) Mikkel Jensen (New Zealand) Hunter McElrea**	**Gibson GK428 4.2 L V8**	**338**	**+5 Laps‡**
10	LMP2	22	(United States) United Autosports USA	(United Kingdom) Paul di Resta (United States) Dan Goldburg (Sweden) Rasmus Lindh	Oreca 07	338	+5 Laps
10	LMP2	22	(United States) United Autosports USA	(United Kingdom) Paul di Resta (United States) Dan Goldburg (Sweden) Rasmus Lindh	Gibson GK428 4.2 L V8	338	+5 Laps
11	LMP2	8	(Canada) Tower Motorsports	(Mexico) Sebastián Álvarez (Canada) John Farano (France) Tristan Vautier	Oreca 07	338	+5 Laps
11	LMP2	8	(Canada) Tower Motorsports	(Mexico) Sebastián Álvarez (Canada) John Farano (France) Tristan Vautier	Gibson GK428 4.2 L V8	338	+5 Laps
12	LMP2	18	(United States) Era Motorsport	(United States) Jacob Abel (Austria) Ferdinand Habsburg (United States) Naveen Rao	Oreca 07	338	+5 Laps
12	LMP2	18	(United States) Era Motorsport	(United States) Jacob Abel (Austria) Ferdinand Habsburg (United States) Naveen Rao	Gibson GK428 4.2 L V8	338	+5 Laps
13	LMP2	04	(Portugal) CrowdStrike Racing by APR	(United States) George Kurtz (United Kingdom) Alex Quinn (United Kingdom) Toby Sowery	Oreca 07	338	+5 Laps
13	LMP2	04	(Portugal) CrowdStrike Racing by APR	(United States) George Kurtz (United Kingdom) Alex Quinn (United Kingdom) Toby Sowery	Gibson GK428 4.2 L V8	338	+5 Laps
14	LMP2	99	(United States) AO Racing	(United States) Dane Cameron (United Kingdom) Jonny Edgar (United States) P. J. Hyett	Oreca 07	338	+5 Laps
14	LMP2	99	(United States) AO Racing	(United States) Dane Cameron (United Kingdom) Jonny Edgar (United States) P. J. Hyett	Gibson GK428 4.2 L V8	338	+5 Laps
15	LMP2	11	(France) TDS Racing	(Denmark) David Heinemeier Hansson (Canada) Tobias Lütke (France) Charles Milesi	Oreca 07	338	+5 Laps
15	LMP2	11	(France) TDS Racing	(Denmark) David Heinemeier Hansson (Canada) Tobias Lütke (France) Charles Milesi	Gibson GK428 4.2 L V8	338	+5 Laps
16	LMP2	52	(United States) Bryan Herta Autosport with PR1/Mathiasen	(Canada) Misha Goikhberg (Canada) Parker Thompson (United Kingdom) Harry Tincknell	Oreca 07	336	+7 Laps
16	LMP2	52	(United States) Bryan Herta Autosport with PR1/Mathiasen	(Canada) Misha Goikhberg (Canada) Parker Thompson (United Kingdom) Harry Tincknell	Gibson GK428 4.2 L V8	336	+7 Laps
17	LMP2	73	(United States) Pratt Miller Motorsports	(Canada) Chris Cumming (Portugal) Manuel Espírito Santo (Brazil) Pietro Fittipaldi	Oreca 07	336	+7 Laps
17	LMP2	73	(United States) Pratt Miller Motorsports	(Canada) Chris Cumming (Portugal) Manuel Espírito Santo (Brazil) Pietro Fittipaldi	Gibson GK428 4.2 L V8	336	+7 Laps
18	LMP2	37	(United States) Intersport Racing	(United States) Jon Field (United Kingdom) Oliver Jarvis (United States) Seth Lucas	Oreca 07	334	+9 Laps
18	LMP2	37	(United States) Intersport Racing	(United States) Jon Field (United Kingdom) Oliver Jarvis (United States) Seth Lucas	Gibson GK428 4.2 L V8	334	+9 Laps
19	GTP	23	(United States) Aston Martin THOR Team	(Canada) Roman De Angelis (United Kingdom) Ross Gunn (Spain) Alex Riberas	Aston Martin Valkyrie	331	+12 Laps
19	GTP	23	(United States) Aston Martin THOR Team	(Canada) Roman De Angelis (United Kingdom) Ross Gunn (Spain) Alex Riberas	Aston Martin RA 6.5 L V12	331	+12 Laps
20	GTP	25	(Belgium) BMW M Team WRT	(Austria) Philipp Eng (Denmark) Kevin Magnussen (Germany) Marco Wittmann	BMW M Hybrid V8	329	+14 Laps
20	GTP	25	(Belgium) BMW M Team WRT	(Austria) Philipp Eng (Denmark) Kevin Magnussen (Germany) Marco Wittmann	BMW P66/3 4.0 L Turbo V8	329	+14 Laps
21	GTP	10	(United States) Cadillac Wayne Taylor Racing	(Portugal) Filipe Albuquerque (United Kingdom) Will Stevens (United States) Ricky Taylor	Cadillac V-Series.R	343	+9.402^{1}
21	GTP	10	(United States) Cadillac Wayne Taylor Racing	(Portugal) Filipe Albuquerque (United Kingdom) Will Stevens (United States) Ricky Taylor	Cadillac LMC55R 5.5 L V8	343	+9.402^{1}
22	**GTD Pro**	**911**	**(Germany) Manthey Racing**	**(Austria) Klaus Bachler (Switzerland) Ricardo Feller (Austria) Thomas Preining**	**Porsche 911 GT3 R (992.2)**	**321**	**+22 Laps‡**
22	**GTD Pro**	**911**	**(Germany) Manthey Racing**	**(Austria) Klaus Bachler (Switzerland) Ricardo Feller (Austria) Thomas Preining**	**Porsche M97/80 4.2 L Flat-6**	**321**	**+22 Laps‡**
23	GTD Pro	77	(United States) AO Racing	(United Kingdom) Harry King (Belgium) Alessio Picariello (United Kingdom) Nick Tandy	Porsche 911 GT3 R (992.2)	321	+22 Laps
23	GTD Pro	77	(United States) AO Racing	(United Kingdom) Harry King (Belgium) Alessio Picariello (United Kingdom) Nick Tandy	Porsche M97/80 4.2 L Flat-6	321	+22 Laps
24	GTD Pro	4	(United States) Corvette Racing by Pratt Miller Motorsports	(Netherlands) Nicky Catsburg (United States) Tommy Milner (Argentina) Nicolás Varrone	Chevrolet Corvette Z06 GT3.R	321	+22 Laps
24	GTD Pro	4	(United States) Corvette Racing by Pratt Miller Motorsports	(Netherlands) Nicky Catsburg (United States) Tommy Milner (Argentina) Nicolás Varrone	Chevrolet LT6.R 5.5 L V8	321	+22 Laps
25	GTD Pro	3	(United States) Corvette Racing by Pratt Miller Motorsports	(Spain) Antonio García (Germany) Marvin Kirchhöfer (United Kingdom) Alexander Sims	Chevrolet Corvette Z06 GT3.R	321	+22 Laps
25	GTD Pro	3	(United States) Corvette Racing by Pratt Miller Motorsports	(Spain) Antonio García (Germany) Marvin Kirchhöfer (United Kingdom) Alexander Sims	Chevrolet LT6.R 5.5 L V8	321	+22 Laps
26	GTD Pro	1	(United States) Paul Miller Racing	(United States) Connor De Phillippi (Germany) Max Hesse (United States) Neil Verhagen	BMW M4 GT3 Evo	321	+22 Laps
26	GTD Pro	1	(United States) Paul Miller Racing	(United States) Connor De Phillippi (Germany) Max Hesse (United States) Neil Verhagen	BMW P58 3.0 L Turbo I6	321	+22 Laps
27	GTD Pro	64	(United States) Ford Racing	(United Kingdom) Ben Barker (Norway) Dennis Olsen (Germany) Mike Rockenfeller	Ford Mustang GT3 Evo	321	+22 Laps
27	GTD Pro	64	(United States) Ford Racing	(United Kingdom) Ben Barker (Norway) Dennis Olsen (Germany) Mike Rockenfeller	Ford Coyote 5.4 L V8	321	+22 Laps
28	GTD Pro	033	(United States) Triarsi Competizione	(Italy) Riccardo Agostini (United Kingdom) James Calado (Spain) Miguel Molina	Ferrari 296 GT3 Evo	321	+22 Laps
28	GTD Pro	033	(United States) Triarsi Competizione	(Italy) Riccardo Agostini (United Kingdom) James Calado (Spain) Miguel Molina	Ferrari F163CE 3.0 L Turbo V6	321	+22 Laps
29	GTD Pro	65	(United States) Ford Racing	(Germany) Christopher Mies (United Kingdom) Sebastian Priaulx (Belgium) Frédéric Vervisch	Ford Mustang GT3 Evo	321	+22 Laps
29	GTD Pro	65	(United States) Ford Racing	(Germany) Christopher Mies (United Kingdom) Sebastian Priaulx (Belgium) Frédéric Vervisch	Ford Coyote 5.4 L V8	321	+22 Laps
30	GTD Pro	59	(United States) RLL Team McLaren	(United States) Max Esterson (United States) Nikita Johnson (United Kingdom) Dean MacDonald	McLaren 720S GT3 Evo	320	+23 Laps
30	GTD Pro	59	(United States) RLL Team McLaren	(United States) Max Esterson (United States) Nikita Johnson (United Kingdom) Dean MacDonald	McLaren M840T 4.0 L Turbo V8	320	+23 Laps
31	GTD Pro	9	(Canada) Pfaff Motorsports	(Italy) Andrea Caldarelli (United Kingdom) Sandy Mitchell (France) Franck Perera	Lamborghini Temerario GT3	320	+23 Laps
31	GTD Pro	9	(Canada) Pfaff Motorsports	(Italy) Andrea Caldarelli (United Kingdom) Sandy Mitchell (France) Franck Perera	Lamborghini L411 4.0 L Turbo V8	320	+23 Laps
32	**GTD**	**21**	**(Italy) AF Corse USA**	**(Italy) Antonio Fuoco (United States) Simon Mann (France) Lilou Wadoux**	**Ferrari 296 GT3 Evo**	**318**	**+25 Laps‡**
32	**GTD**	**21**	**(Italy) AF Corse USA**	**(Italy) Antonio Fuoco (United States) Simon Mann (France) Lilou Wadoux**	**Ferrari F163CE 3.0 L Turbo V6**	**318**	**+25 Laps‡**
33	GTD	27	(United States) Heart of Racing Team	(Brazil) Eduardo Barrichello (United Kingdom) Tom Gamble (Canada) Zacharie Robichon	Aston Martin Vantage AMR GT3 Evo	318	+25 Laps
33	GTD	27	(United States) Heart of Racing Team	(Brazil) Eduardo Barrichello (United Kingdom) Tom Gamble (Canada) Zacharie Robichon	Aston Martin AMR16A 4.0 L Turbo V8	318	+25 Laps
34	GTD	120	(United States) Wright Motorsports	(United States) Adam Adelson (United Kingdom) Callum Ilott (Australia) Tom Sargent	Porsche 911 GT3 R (992.2)	318	+25 Laps
34	GTD	120	(United States) Wright Motorsports	(United States) Adam Adelson (United Kingdom) Callum Ilott (Australia) Tom Sargent	Porsche M97/80 4.2 L Flat-6	318	+25 Laps
35	GTD	80	(United States) Lone Star Racing	(Australia) Scott Andrews (Netherlands) Lin Hodenius (Republic of Ireland) James Roe	Mercedes-AMG GT3 Evo	318	+25 Laps
35	GTD	80	(United States) Lone Star Racing	(Australia) Scott Andrews (Netherlands) Lin Hodenius (Republic of Ireland) James Roe	Mercedes-AMG M159 6.2 L V8	318	+25 Laps
36	GTD	96	(United States) Turner Motorsport	(United States) Robby Foley (United States) Patrick Gallagher (United States) Francis Selldorff	BMW M4 GT3 Evo	318	+25 Laps
36	GTD	96	(United States) Turner Motorsport	(United States) Robby Foley (United States) Patrick Gallagher (United States) Francis Selldorff	BMW P58 3.0 L Turbo I6	318	+25 Laps
37	GTD	13	(Canada) 13 Autosport	(United Kingdom) Matt Bell (Canada) Orey Fidani (Germany) Lars Kern	Chevrolet Corvette Z06 GT3.R	318	+25 Laps
37	GTD	13	(Canada) 13 Autosport	(United Kingdom) Matt Bell (Canada) Orey Fidani (Germany) Lars Kern	Chevrolet LT6.R 5.5 L V8	318	+25 Laps
38	GTD	34	(United States) Conquest Racing	(Spain) Albert Costa (United States) Manny Franco (Italy) Lorenzo Patrese	Ferrari 296 GT3 Evo	318	+25 Laps
38	GTD	34	(United States) Conquest Racing	(Spain) Albert Costa (United States) Manny Franco (Italy) Lorenzo Patrese	Ferrari F163CE 3.0 L Turbo V6	318	+25 Laps
39	GTD	66	(United States) Gradient Racing	(United Kingdom) Till Bechtolsheimer (United States) Joey Hand (United States) Jake Walker	Ford Mustang GT3 Evo	318	+25 Laps
39	GTD	66	(United States) Gradient Racing	(United Kingdom) Till Bechtolsheimer (United States) Joey Hand (United States) Jake Walker	Ford Coyote 5.4 L V8	318	+25 Laps
40	GTD	36	(United States) DXDT Racing	(Republic of Ireland) Charlie Eastwood (United States) Mason Filippi (Turkey) Salih Yoluç	Chevrolet Corvette Z06 GT3.R	317	+26 Laps
40	GTD	36	(United States) DXDT Racing	(Republic of Ireland) Charlie Eastwood (United States) Mason Filippi (Turkey) Salih Yoluç	Chevrolet LT6.R 5.5 L V8	317	+26 Laps
41	GTD Pro	14	(United States) Vasser Sullivan Racing	(United Kingdom) Ben Barnicoat (United Kingdom) Jack Hawksworth (United States) Kyle Kirkwood	Lexus RC F GT3	316	+27 Laps
41	GTD Pro	14	(United States) Vasser Sullivan Racing	(United Kingdom) Ben Barnicoat (United Kingdom) Jack Hawksworth (United States) Kyle Kirkwood	Toyota 2UR-GSE 5.4 L V8	316	+27 Laps
42	GTD	28	(United States) RS1	(Belgium) Jan Heylen (United States) Dillon Machavern (United States) Spencer Pumpelly	Porsche 911 GT3 R (992.2)	312	+31 Laps
42	GTD	28	(United States) RS1	(Belgium) Jan Heylen (United States) Dillon Machavern (United States) Spencer Pumpelly	Porsche M97/80 4.2 L Flat-6	312	+31 Laps
43	LMP2	43	(Poland) Inter Europol Competition	(United States) Jeremy Clarke (France) Tom Dillmann (United States) Bijoy Garg	Oreca 07	303	+40 Laps
43	LMP2	43	(Poland) Inter Europol Competition	(United States) Jeremy Clarke (France) Tom Dillmann (United States) Bijoy Garg	Gibson GK428 4.2 L V8	303	+40 Laps
44 DNF	GTD	16	(United States) Myers Riley Motorsports	(United States) Jenson Altzman (Brazil) Felipe Fraga (United States) Sheena Monk	Ford Mustang GT3 Evo	279	Accident
44 DNF	GTD	16	(United States) Myers Riley Motorsports	(United States) Jenson Altzman (Brazil) Felipe Fraga (United States) Sheena Monk	Ford Coyote 5.4 L V8	279	Accident
45	GTD	12	(United States) Vasser Sullivan Racing	(United States) Frankie Montecalvo (Denmark) Benjamin Pedersen (United States) Aaron Telitz	Lexus RC F GT3	268	+75 Laps
45	GTD	12	(United States) Vasser Sullivan Racing	(United States) Frankie Montecalvo (Denmark) Benjamin Pedersen (United States) Aaron Telitz	Toyota 2UR-GSE 5.4 L V8	268	+75 Laps
46 DNF	GTD	19	(United States) van der Steur Racing	(France) Sébastien Baud (France) Valentin Hasse-Clot (United States) Rory van der Steur	Aston Martin Vantage AMR GT3 Evo	239	Mechanical
46 DNF	GTD	19	(United States) van der Steur Racing	(France) Sébastien Baud (France) Valentin Hasse-Clot (United States) Rory van der Steur	Aston Martin AMR16A 4.0 L Turbo V8	239	Mechanical
47 DNF	GTD Pro	48	(United States) Winward Racing	(United States) Jason Hart (United States) Scott Noble (Germany) Luca Stolz	Mercedes-AMG GT3 Evo	223	Misfire
47 DNF	GTD Pro	48	(United States) Winward Racing	(United States) Jason Hart (United States) Scott Noble (Germany) Luca Stolz	Mercedes-AMG M159 6.2 L V8	223	Misfire
48 DNF	GTD	023	(United States) Triarsi Competizione	(United States) Kenton Koch (United States) Robert Megennis (United States) Onofrio Triarsi	Ferrari 296 GT3 Evo	208	Engine
48 DNF	GTD	023	(United States) Triarsi Competizione	(United States) Kenton Koch (United States) Robert Megennis (United States) Onofrio Triarsi	Ferrari F163CE 3.0 L Turbo V6	208	Engine
49 DNF	GTD	81	(United States) DragonSpeed	(Italy) Giacomo Altoè (Sweden) Henrik Hedman (United Kingdom) Casper Stevenson	Chevrolet Corvette Z06 GT3.R	155	Accident damage
49 DNF	GTD	81	(United States) DragonSpeed	(Italy) Giacomo Altoè (Sweden) Henrik Hedman (United Kingdom) Casper Stevenson	Chevrolet LT6.R 5.5 L V8	155	Accident damage
50 DNF	GTD	45	(United States) Wayne Taylor Racing	(United States) Graham Doyle (Costa Rica) Danny Formal (United States) Trent Hindman	Lamborghini Huracán GT3 Evo 2	150	Oil seals
50 DNF	GTD	45	(United States) Wayne Taylor Racing	(United States) Graham Doyle (Costa Rica) Danny Formal (United States) Trent Hindman	Lamborghini DGF 5.2 L V10	150	Oil seals
51 DNF	GTD	70	(United Kingdom) Inception Racing	(United States) Brendan Iribe (United Kingdom) Ollie Millroy (Denmark) Frederik Schandorff	Ferrari 296 GT3 Evo	111	Collision
51 DNF	GTD	70	(United Kingdom) Inception Racing	(United States) Brendan Iribe (United Kingdom) Ollie Millroy (Denmark) Frederik Schandorff	Ferrari F163CE 3.0 L Turbo V6	111	Collision
52 DNF	GTD Pro	62	(United States) Risi Competizione	(Italy) Alessandro Pier Guidi (Italy) Davide Rigon (Brazil) Daniel Serra	Ferrari 296 GT3 Evo	76	Collision
52 DNF	GTD Pro	62	(United States) Risi Competizione	(Italy) Alessandro Pier Guidi (Italy) Davide Rigon (Brazil) Daniel Serra	Ferrari F163CE 3.0 L Turbo V6	76	Collision
53 DNF	GTD	57	(United States) Winward Racing	(Netherlands) Indy Dontje (Switzerland) Philip Ellis (United States) Russell Ward	Mercedes-AMG GT3 Evo	76	Collision
53 DNF	GTD	57	(United States) Winward Racing	(Netherlands) Indy Dontje (Switzerland) Philip Ellis (United States) Russell Ward	Mercedes-AMG M159 6.2 L V8	76	Collision
54 DNF	GTD	912	(Germany) Manthey 1st Phorm	(United States) Ryan Hardwick (Italy) Riccardo Pera (Netherlands) Morris Schuring	Porsche 911 GT3 R (992.2)	302	Overheating^{2}
54 DNF	GTD	912	(Germany) Manthey 1st Phorm	(United States) Ryan Hardwick (Italy) Riccardo Pera (Netherlands) Morris Schuring	Porsche M97/80 4.2 L Flat-6	302	Overheating^{2}
DNS	LMP2	79	(United States) JDC-Miller MotorSports	(Australia) Josh Burdon (United Kingdom) Sennan Fielding (United States) Gerry Kraut	Oreca 07	0	Did not start
DNS	LMP2	79	(United States) JDC-Miller MotorSports	(Australia) Josh Burdon (United Kingdom) Sennan Fielding (United States) Gerry Kraut	Gibson GK428 4.2 L V8	0	Did not start
Provisional results

- ^{1} The No. 10 Cadillac Wayne Taylor Racing entry was moved to last in the GTP class after failing post-race technical inspection due to having camber in excess of permitted tire pressure regulations.
- ^{2} The No. 912 Manthey 1st Phorm entry was moved to last in the GTD class due to violating drive time rules, as Riccardo Pera failed to drive the minimum required time during the race.

IMSA SportsCar Championship
Previous race: 24 Hours of Daytona	2026 season	Next race: Grand Prix of Long Beach
