= Audi Nuvolari =

Plug-in hybrid sports car produced by Audi

Overview
- Manufacturer: Audi
- Production: Late 2026 (to commence); Limited to 499 units
- Model years: 2027 (planned)
- Designer: Massimo Frascella

Body and chassis
- Class: Sports car (S)
- Body style: 2-door coupé
- Layout: Rear mid-engine, four-wheel-drive
- Related: Lamborghini Temerario

Powertrain
- Engine: Petrol PHEV: 4.0 L Lamborghini L411 twin-turbo V8
- Electric motor: 3x axial-flux electric motors
- Power output: 1,001 PS (736 kW; 987 hp)
- Transmission: 8-speed dual-clutch transmission
- Hybrid drivetrain: PHEV
- Battery: 7.3kWh Li-ion

Chronology
- Predecessor: Audi R8

The Audi Nuvolari is a forthcoming mid-engine plug-in hybrid sports car to be manufactured by German automobile company, Audi. The Nuvolari is intended as Audi's fastest and most powerful production vehicle in its history.

== Overview ==
=== Name origin ===
The name "Nuvolari" pays homage to Italian racing driver Tazio Nuvolari, winner of the 1932 AIACR European Championship — whom Ferdinand Porsche called "the greatest driver of the past, the present, and the future".

=== Design ===
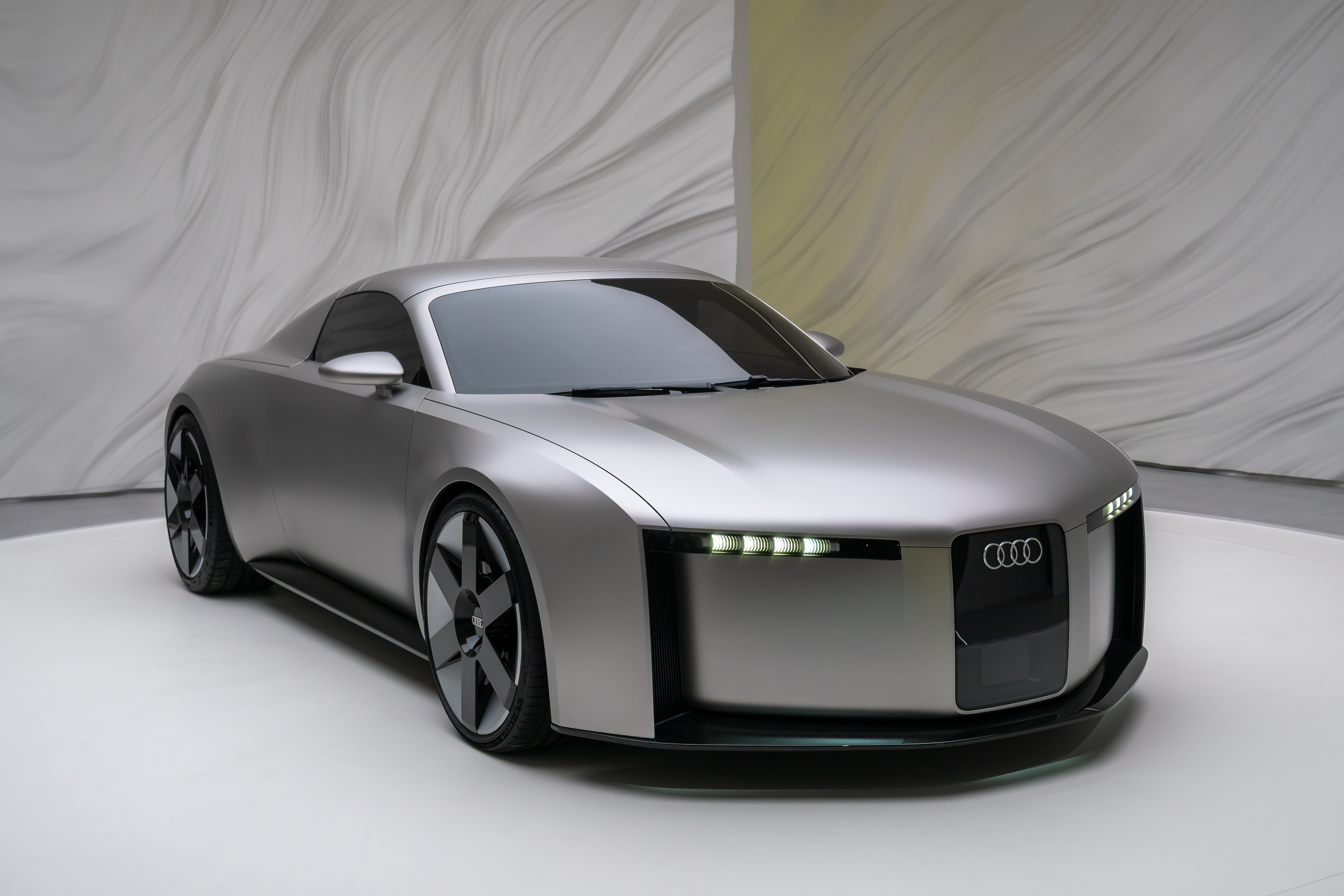
Audi Concept C, 2025

The Nuvolari features four horizontally arranged lighting elements at both the front and rear. The rear window was omitted in favor of side-mounted air intakes. Its size and proportions have been compared to those of the R8 and several Lamborghini models. The design language introduced by the Concept C was carried over to the Nuvolari.

=== Features ===
All exterior grilles are constructed from aluminum, as are the interior controls, air vents, and door handles. A central touchscreen is accompanied by additional aluminum controls, while the instrument cluster features a circular display. Carbon-fiber panels behind the doors incorporate three air vents positioned in the upper, lower, and trailing sections, which supply air to the engine, cooling systems, and brakes, respectively. The door handles are integrated into these panels.

The seats feature carbon-fiber bases and backrests.

== History ==
Development of the Nuvolari began in March 2025 and was completed in 14 months.

On June 16, 2025, Audi's CEO Gernot Döllner announced that the company would reverse its plan to phase out the development of combustion-powered engines. The strategy, which had been announced in 2023, called for Audi to cease introducing new combustion-powered models after 2026 and discontinue production of combustion-powered engines by 2033.

Audi unveiled the Nuvolari on June 4, 2026. On the same day, the company announced that production would be limited to 499 units, with deliveries scheduled to begin in 2027.

== Powertrain ==
The Nuvolari is powered by a twin-turbocharged V8 petrol engine made by Lamborghini and codenamed L411. The engine produces 800 PS (588 kW; 789 hp) and 730 N⋅m (538 lb⋅ft) of torque, and is paired with three electric motors, each producing 110 kW (148 hp) (444 hp). Combined system output is rated at 1,001 PS (736 kW; 987 hp). Energy is supplied by a 7.3 kWh lithium-ion battery.

The two front-mounted electric motors each produce 2,150 N⋅m (1,586 lb⋅ft). Compared with the Lamborghini Temerario, the Nuvolari produces 81 PS (60 kW; 80 hp) more system power. The V8 engine itself develops 11 PS (8.1 kW; 11 hp) more than the Temerario's version, while the electric motors retain the same power output. The engine has a redline of 10,000 rpm.
