= Lamborghini Temerario =

Sports car produced by Lamborghini

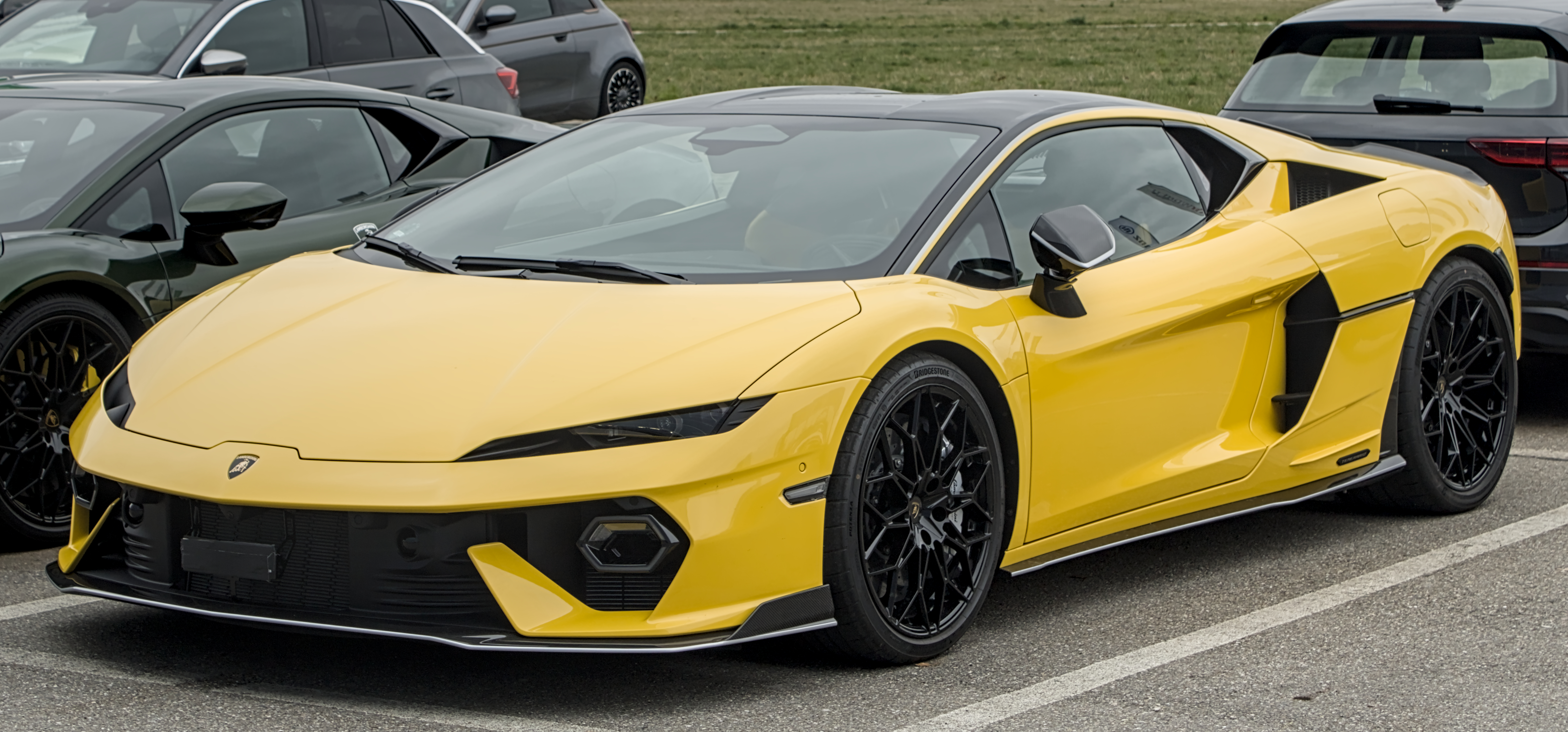

Overview
- Manufacturer: Lamborghini
- Model code: LB634
- Production: 2025–present
- Assembly: Italy: Sant'Agata Bolognese
- Designer: Mitja Borkert

Body and chassis
- Class: Sports car (S)
- Body style: 2-door coupé; 2-door convertible
- Layout: Longitudinal mid-engine, four-wheel-drive
- Related: Audi Nuvolari

Powertrain
- Engine: 4.0 L L411 twin-turbocharged V8
- Electric motor: 3x electric motors (2x in front and 1 in rear)
- Power output: 920 PS (677 kW; 907 hp)
- Transmission: 8-speed Graziano dual-clutch
- Hybrid drivetrain: Plug-in hybrid
- Battery: 3.8 kWh Lithium-ion

Dimensions
- Wheelbase: 2,658 mm (104.6 in)
- Length: 4,706 mm (185.3 in)
- Width: 1,996 mm (78.6 in)
- Height: 1,201 mm (47.3 in)
- Curb weight: 1,690 kg (3,726 lb) dry

Chronology
- Predecessor: Lamborghini Huracán

The Lamborghini Temerario is a mid-engine plug-in hybrid sports car produced by the Italian automobile manufacturer Lamborghini. This car marks the return of a V8 mid-engined Lamborghini model, the first since the 1981 Lamborghini Jalpa. It is the second Lamborghini after the Urus to be offered with a twin-turbocharged V8.

== History ==
Lamborghini announced the debut of the Temerario in July 2024, with an X post on 15 August announcing a reveal event for the new car at 19:00 CEST (UTC+2), which took place on 16 August at Monterey Car Week.

== Name ==
In keeping with the Lamborghini tradition of naming car models after famous fighting bulls, Lamborghini CEO Stephan Winkelmann stated that "Temerario is the name of a fighting bull that fought in 1875, and Temerario means fierce, courageous."

== Powertrain ==
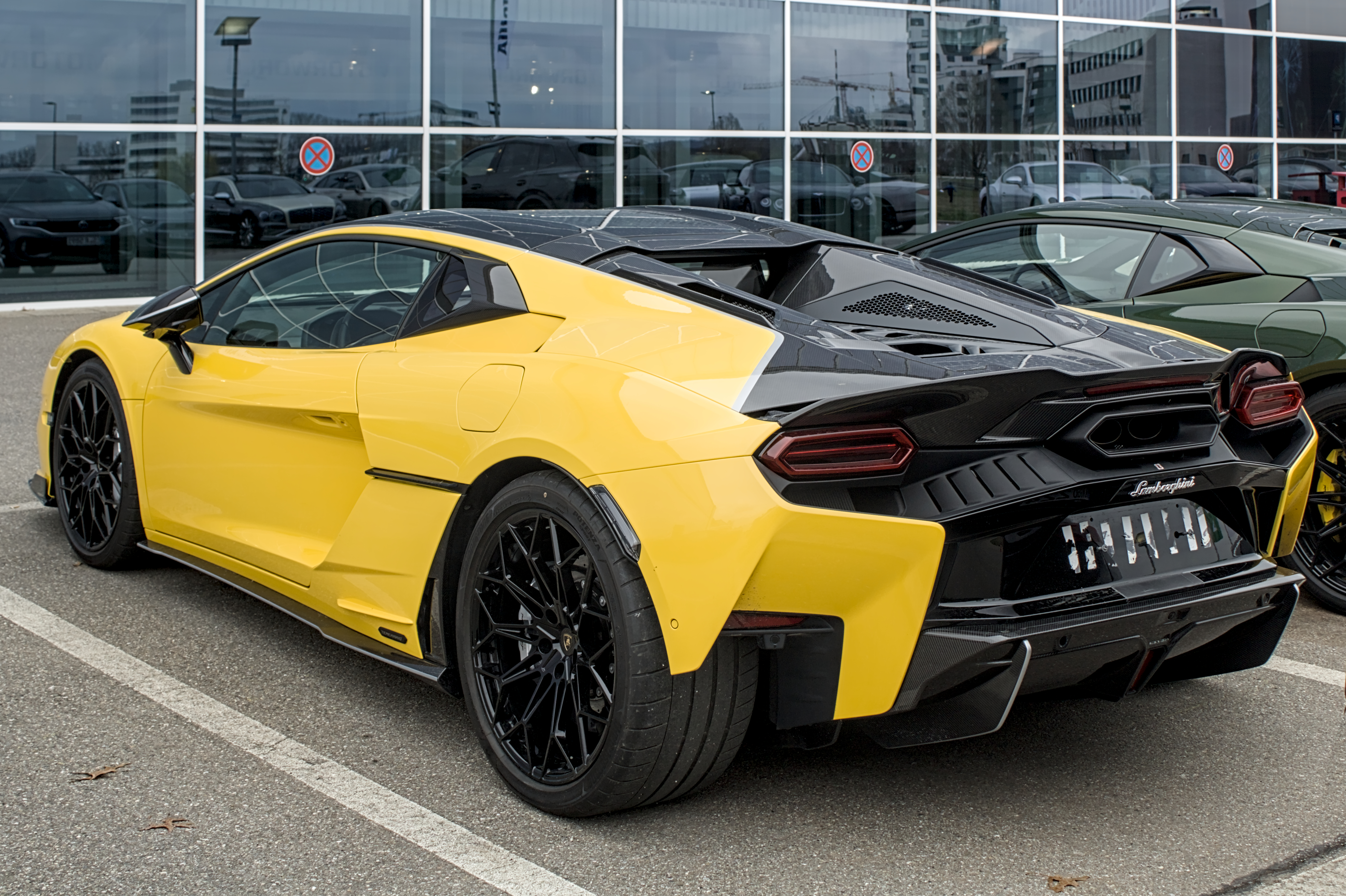
Rear view

The all-new flat-plane hot vee 4.0L (3995.2 cc) V8 engine produces 800 PS (588 kW; 789 hp) from 9,000 to 9,750 rpm and 730 N⋅m (538 lb⋅ft) of torque between 4,000 and 7,000 rpm, with a 10,250 rpm redline, making the Temerario the first ever Lamborghini to safely rev past 10,000 rpm. To allow it to rev higher, it has titanium connecting rods, a short stroke, and a flat plane crankshaft. The electric motor between the engine and gearbox produces 300 N⋅m (221 lb⋅ft) and 150 PS (110 kW; 148 hp) at 3,500 rpm. There are two other electric motors on the front axle. The motors make use of axial-flux electric motors that provide a larger magnetic surface for better performance. Combined power output is 920 PS (677 kW; 907 hp). The engine is mechanically unrelated to the 4.0L (3996 cc) hot vee Volkswagen-Audi V8 engine (4.0 TFSI). The Temerario uses the existing 3.8 kWh battery pack from the Lamborghini Revuelto.

== Transmission ==
The Temerario uses an adapted version of the Revuelto’s 8-speed dual-clutch transmission. The gearbox is transverse and mounted behind the engine.

== Performance ==
Lamborghini has stated that the maximum speed of the Temerario is 343 km/h (213 mph), and it can accelerate from 0–100 km/h (0–62 mph) in 2.7 seconds. Braking from 100-0 km/h takes 32 m (105 ft).

== Variants ==
=== Porto Cervo (2025) ===
The Temerario Porto Cervo is a one-off presented in Porto Cervo, Sardinia, built by the special Ad Personam department, with a Grigio Serget livery.

=== Portofino (2026) ===
The Temerario Portofino is a one-off unveiled on 26 February 2026, built by the special Ad Personam department, with a Blu Uranus livery. The interiors are Blu Delphinus and Blu Cepheus. The wheels are Algareno Cast 20/21" Diamond Cut Matte Titanium, and with Blu CCB brake calipers.

=== Tricolore (2026) ===
At the 2026 Monterey Car Week, Lamborghini presented the Temerario Tricolore dedicated to Italy, built by the special Ad Personam department, with a white livery and Italian tricolor stripe.

=== Spyder (2026–present) ===
A convertible version of the Temerario was revealed on 19 November 2026. It is the first retractable hardtop convertible by Lamborghini, featuring a vertically folding roof powered by electric actuators rather than an electro-hydraulic system. This change was made to minimize changes to the center of gravity and weight distribution.

== Motorsport ==
=== GT3 ===
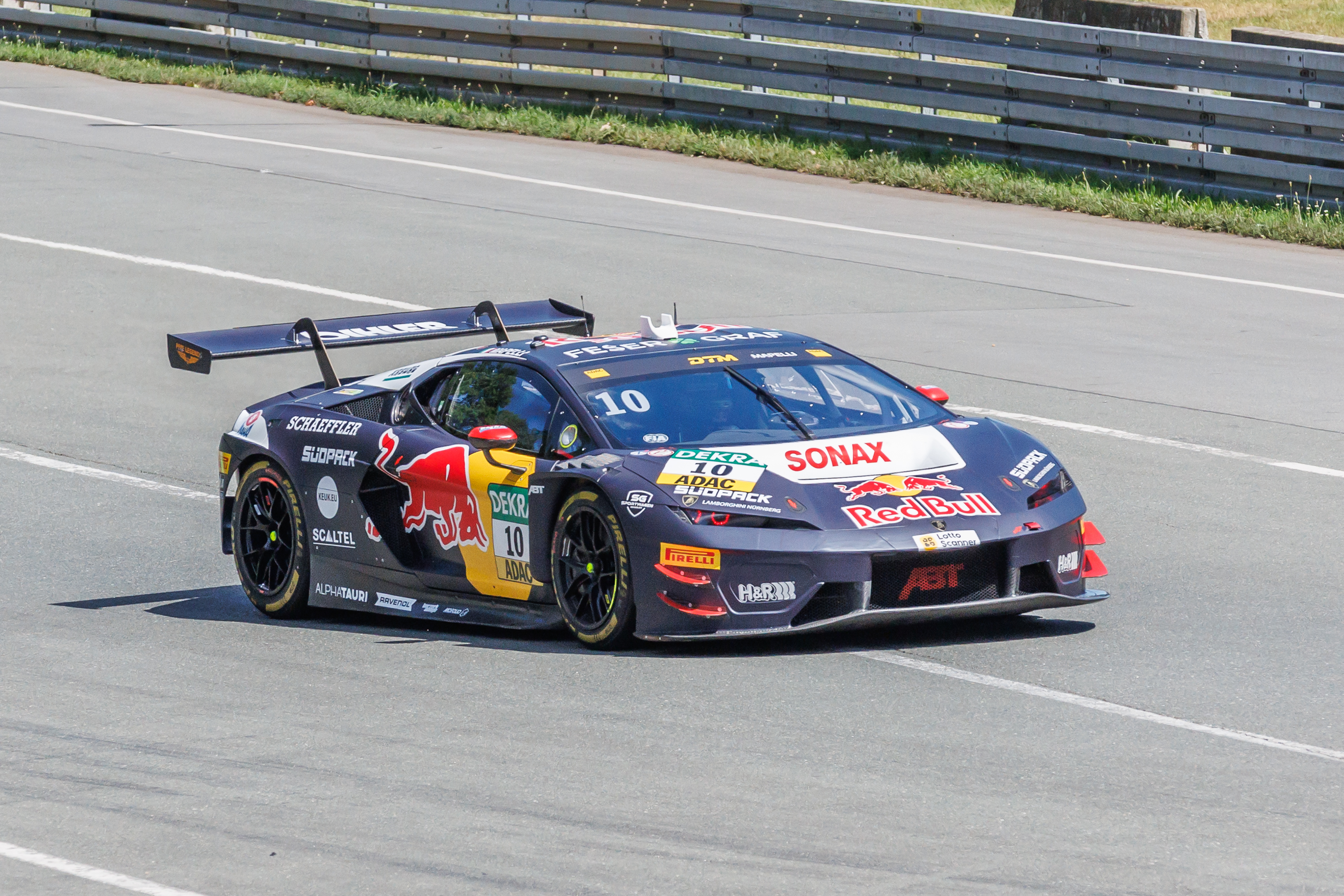
Temerario GT3 of Red Bull Team Abt driven by Marco Mapelli during the 2026 DTM round in Norisring

Lamborghini developed a GT3 racing version of the Temerario, built to Group GT3 regulations. It is the company's first to be entirely designed, developed and built by Lamborghini. This car made its race debut in 2026, and replaces the Huracán GT3 Evo 2 as Lamborghini's main GT3 racecar. It uses the same twin-turbo V8 as the street car, but without electric motors, as these are not allowed in GT3 racing. The car made its first competitive start at the 2026 12 Hours of Sebring, finishing 10th in the GTD Pro class after completing 320 laps. Two cars were entered in the 2026 24 Hours of Spa, the first 24-hour race for the new car. The #63 Grasser Racing Team car retired after 144 laps whereas the Rutronik Racing #96 car finished 19th overall after completing 537 laps.

Andrea Caldarelli and Sandy Mitchell took the first IMSA WeatherTech Sportscar Championship class victory for the Temerario, winning the GTD Pro category driving for Pfaff Motorsports at the Road America six-hour endurance round. Marco Mapelli and Mirko Bortolotti had each won individually with the car earlier in the 2026 Deutsche Tourenwagen Masters; however, both drivers received infractions, the former penalized and the latter disqualified, and lost their respective wins following post-race inspections.

=== Super Trofeo ===
Lamborghini unveiled the Super Trofeo in August 2025 with plans to introduce a Super Trofeo version of the Temerario in 2027, replacing the Huracán Super Trofeo EVO2.

== Sales ==
Year	Production
2024	81
2025	546
