= Lamborghini L411 engine =

Overview
- Manufacturer: Lamborghini
- Designer: Davide Bizzarri
- Production: 2025–present

Layout
- Configuration: 90° V8
- Displacement: 4.0 L (3,995.2 cc)
- Cylinder bore: 90 mm (3.5 in)
- Piston stroke: 78.5 mm (3 in)
- Cylinder block material: Aluminium alloy
- Cylinder head material: Aluminium alloy
- Valvetrain: 32-valve (four-valves per cylinder), DOHC
- Valvetrain drive system: Gears and chains
- Compression ratio: 9.3:1

RPM range
- Max. engine speed: 10,250

Combustion
- Turbocharger: Twin-turbocharged
- Fuel system: Gasoline direct injection
- Oil system: Dry sump

Output
- Power output: 789 hp (588 kW; 800 PS)
- Torque output: 538 lb⋅ft (729 N⋅m)

The Lamborghini L411 engine is a ninety degree (90°) V8 petrol engine which is developed for the Lamborghini Temerario, first sold in 2025.

== Design ==
The Lamborghini L411 is a flat-plane, ninety degree (90°), hot vee V8 engine. It has a bore of 90 mm (3.5 in) and a stroke of 78.5 mm (3.1 in), with a redline of 10,250 rpm, producing 789 hp (588 kW; 800 PS). Despite the Lamborghini Urus SE also featuring a hybrid V8 engine (EA825), the L411 is not compatible as it is specifically designed to fit in the Temerario. It reaches maximum power around 9,000 through 9,750 rpm while the peak torque plateau starts at 4,000 and tops 7,000 rpm. The L411 is cast using aluminium alloy (A357+Cu), titanium connecting rods and high-strength, long term gas-nitrided steel for the crankshaft to reduce weight and improve performance.

== Applications ==
- Lamborghini Temerario
- Lamborghini Temerario Porto Cervo
- Lamborghini Temerario GT3
- Lamborghini Temerario Super Trofeo
- Audi Nuvolari
