= 2010 Porsche Carrera Cup Italia =

Motor racing competition

2010 Porsche Carrera Cup Italy

Seasons
- ← 2009 2011 →

The 2010 Porsche Carrera Cup Italia season was the fourth Porsche Carrera Cup Italy season. It began on 24 April in Misano and finished on 24 October in Monza. Alessandro Balzan won the championship driving for Ebimotors, which won the teams' championship.

== Teams and drivers ==
Team	No.	Drivers	Class	Rounds
(Italy) Ebimotors	1	(Italy) Alessandro Balzan		All
(Italy) Ebimotors	4	(Italy) Alex Frassineti		All
(Italy) Ebimotors	5	(Italy) Massimiliano Fantini		All
(Italy) Ebimotors	55	(Italy) Alessandro Bonacini	S	All
(Italy) Antonelli Motorsport	7	(Italy) Massimo Monti		All
(Italy) Antonelli Motorsport	12	(Italy) Christian Passuti		All
(Italy) Antonelli Motorsport	99	(Italy) Massimo Giondi	S	All
(Italy) Centro Porsche Padova	9	(United Kingdom) James Sutton		1-2
(Italy) Centro Porsche Padova	9	(Italy) Giovanni Anapoli		7
(Italy) Centro Porsche Padova	77	(Italy) Vitaliano Maccario	S	1, 7
(Italy) Centro Porsche Padova	77	(Italy) Alberto Bresci	S	3-5
(Italy) Centro Porsche Padova	78	(Italy) Alberto Bresci	S	1
(Italy) Petricorse Motorsport	10	(Italy) Vito Postiglione		All
(Italy) Petricorse Motorsport	11	(Italy) Enrico Fulgenzi		1-2, 4-5
(Italy) Petricorse Motorsport	11	(Ukraine) Oleksandr Gaidai		6-7
(Italy) Petricorse Motorsport	74	(Italy) Emanuele Busnelli	S	5
(Italy) Petricorse Motorsport	80	(Italy) Alan Simoni	S	1-4
(Italy) Petricorse Motorsport	80	(Italy) Andrea Pagliai	S	5-7
(Italy) Petricorse Motorsport	85	(Italy) Franco Greco	S	1-2
(Italy) Petricorse Motorsport	85	(Italy) Gianluca Carboni	S	3-7
(Italy) GDL Racing	16	(Italy) Giorgio Piccioni		All
(Italy) GDL Racing	61	(Ukraine) Oleksandr Gaidai	S	2
(Italy) Erre Esse Motorsport	25	(Italy) Angelo Proietti		All
(Italy) Erre Esse Motorsport	52	(Italy) Davide Roda	S	All
(Italy) GT Motorsport by Autotecnica Tadini	19	(Italy) Walter Ben		All
(Italy) AB Racing	21	(Italy) Angelo Rogari		All
(Italy) AB Racing	46	(Italy) Stefano Comandini		All
(Italy) AB Racing	69	(Italy) Pier Giacomo Cappella	S	1-3, 6-7
(Italy) Bonaldi Motorsport	27	(Italy) Andrea Sonvico		All
(Italy) Bonaldi Motorsport	72	(Italy) Federico de Nora	S	1-2, 4-7
(Italy) Bonaldi Motorsport	72	(Italy) Eugenio Amos	S	3
(Italy) Star Cars	62	(Italy) Sergio Parato	S	4-7
(Italy) Star Cars	69	(Italy) Alessandro Tedeschini	S	4
(Italy) Star Cars	73	(Italy) Raffaele Giannoni	S	4
(Italy) Star Cars	73	(Italy) Alberto de Amicis	S	7

Icon	Class
S	Silver Cup

== Race calendar and results ==
Round		Circuit	Date	Pole position	Fastest lap	Winning driver	Winning team
1	R1	(Italy) Misano World Circuit, Misano Adriatico	24 April	(Italy) Alessandro Balzan	(Italy) Alessandro Balzan	(Italy) Alessandro Balzan	(Italy) Ebimotors
1	R2	(Italy) Misano World Circuit, Misano Adriatico	25 April		(Italy) Andrea Sonvico	(Italy) Christian Passuti	(Italy) Antonelli Motorsport
2	R1	(Czech Republic) Masaryk Circuit, Brno	22 May	(Italy) Vito Postiglione	(Italy) Alex Frassineti	(Italy) Vito Postiglione	(Italy) Patricorse Motorsport
2	R2	(Czech Republic) Masaryk Circuit, Brno	23 May		(Italy) Stefano Comandini	(Italy) Christian Passuti	(Italy) Antonelli Motorsport
3	R1	(Italy) Adria International Raceway, Adria	20 June	(Italy) Vito Postiglione	(Italy) Stefano Comandini	(Italy) Vito Postiglione	(Italy) Petricorse Motorsport
3	R2	(Italy) Adria International Raceway, Adria	20 June		(Italy) Alessandro Balzan	(Italy) Alex Frassineti	(Italy) Ebimotors
4	R1	(Italy) Autodromo Enzo e Dino Ferrari, Imola	3 July	(Italy) Alessandro Balzan	(Italy) Alessandro Balzan	(Italy) Alessandro Balzan	(Italy) Ebimotors
4	R2	(Italy) Autodromo Enzo e Dino Ferrari, Imola	4 July		(Italy) Alex Frassineti	(Italy) Stefano Comandini	(Italy) AB Racing
5	R1	(Italy) Autodromo Internazionale del Mugello, Scarperia	24 July	(Italy) Ales Frassineti	(Italy) Massimo Monti	(Italy) Massimo Monti	(Italy) Antonelli Motorsport
5	R2	(Italy) Autodromo Internazionale del Mugello, Scarperia	25 July		(Italy) Vito Postiglione	(Italy) Christian Passuti	(Italy) Antonelli Motorsport
6	R1	(Italy) ACI Vallelunga Circuit, Campagnano	25 September	(Italy) Massimo Monti	(Italy) Massimo Monti	(Italy) Massimo Monti	(Italy) Antonelli Motorsport
6	R2	(Italy) ACI Vallelunga Circuit, Campagnano	26 September		(Italy) Christian Passuti	(Italy) Christian Passuti	(Italy) Antonelli Motorsport
7	R1	(Italy) Autodromo Nazionale Monza, Monza	23 October	(Italy) Alessandro Balzan	(Italy) Massimo Monti	(Italy) Alessandro Balzan	(Italy) Ebimotors
7	R2	(Italy) Autodromo Nazionale Monza, Monza	16 October		(Italy) Massimiliano Fantini	(Italy) Alex Frassineti	(Italy) Ebimotors

== Championship standings ==
Points system
	**1st**	**2nd**	**3rd**	**4th**	**5th**	**6th**	**7th**	**8th**	**9th**	**10th**	**Pole**	FL
Race 1	20	15	12	10	8	6	4	3	2	1	2	1
Race 2	15	10	8	6	4	3	2	1				1

=== Drivers' Championship ===
Pos	Driver	MIS (Italy)		BRN (Czech Republic)		ADR (Italy)		IMO (Italy)		MUG (Italy)		VAL (Italy)		MNZ (Italy)		Pts
1	(Italy) Alessandro Balzan	**1**	6	6	9	Ret	5	**1**	Ret	2	2	2	3	**1**	5	134
2	(Italy) Christian Passuti	4	1	4	1	3	Ret	5	Ret	6	1	4	1	4	6	130
3	(Italy) Alex Frassineti	2	Ret	3	Ret	4	1	16	4	**Ret**	22†	3	2	3	1	115
4	(Italy) Massimo Monti	Ret	8	2	3	Ret	12	4	Ret	1	6	**1**	4	2	4	109
5	(Italy) Vito Postiglione	7	2	**1**	6	**1**	6	2	Ret	3	5	9	5	7	Ret	106
6	(Italy) Massimiliano Fantini	6	3	9	7	Ret	16	3	2	4	3	5	Ret	6	2	83
7	(Italy) Stefano Comandini	5	7	8	**4**	2	4	6	1	7	7	7	Ret	8	**3**	80
8	(Italy) Andrea Sonvico	9	5	7	5	5	3	7	DSQ	5	4	6	Ret	5	7	65
9	(United Kingdom) James Sutton	3	4	5	2											36
10	(Italy) Alessandro Bonacini	8	**9**	12	11	6	2	10	14	8	**9**	11	6	10	11	27
11	(Italy) Enrico Fulgenzi	21†	DNS	Ret	Ret	Ret	Ret	8	**3**	17†	12					11
12	(Italy) Giorgio Piccioni	11	11	Ret	19	7	7	Ret	6	16†	10	10	Ret	11	10	10
13	(Italy) Angelo Proietti	12	10	10	8	Ret	Ret	20†	7	Ret	8	8	**Ret**	9	9	10
14	(Italy) Gianluca Carboni					8	**11**	11	8	9	11	13	7	Ret	Ret	8
15	(Italy) Angelo Rogari	Ret	12	11	10	11	8	9	5	12	13	12	Ret	12	Ret	7
16	(Italy) Davide Roda	17	15	Ret	15	9	10	19†	11	10	19	14	10	Ret	Ret	3
17	(Ukraine) Oleksandr Gaidai			14	13							20	8	15	18	1
18	(Italy) Giovanni Anapoli													Ret	8	1
19	(Italy) Alan Simoni	13	Ret	Ret	12	10	9	21†	9							1
20	(Italy) Vitaliano Maccario	10	20†											14	12	0
	(Italy) Andrea Pagliai									Ret	16	15	9	13	14	0
	(Italy) Sergio Parato							14	10	Ret	18	18†	14	18	16	0
	(Italy) Massimo Giondi	15	13	Ret	16	12	15	17	15	Ret	15	16	11	19	19	0
	(Italy) Emanuele Busnelli									11	14					0
	(Italy) Federico de Nora	16	14	13	14			12	13	13	17	Ret	13	16	17	0
	(Italy) Walter Ben	19	19	16	18	13	Ret	13	12	14	21	19†	15	17	13	0
	(Italy) Pier Giacomo Cappella	18	17	15	17	13	14					17	12	Ret	Ret	0
	(Italy) Alberto Bresci	20	18			Ret	13	15	Ret	15	20					0
	(Italy) Franco Greco	14	16	Ret	Ret											0
	(Italy) Alberto de Amicis													Ret	15	0
	(Italy) Alessandro Tedeschini							Ret	16							0
	(Italy) Raffaele Giannoni							18†	Ret							0
	(Italy) Eugenio Amos					Ret	Ret									0
Pos	Driver	MIS (Italy)		BRN (Czech Republic)		ADR (Italy)		IMO (Italy)		MUG (Italy)		VAL (Italy)		MNZ (Italy)		Pts

Colour	Result
Gold	Winner
Silver	Second place
Bronze	Third place
Green	Points classification
Blue	Non-points classification
Blue	Non-classified finish (NC)
Purple	Retired, not classified (Ret)
Red	Did not qualify (DNQ)
Red	Did not pre-qualify (DNPQ)
Black	Disqualified (DSQ)
White	Did not start (DNS)
White	Withdrew (WD)
White	Race cancelled (C)
Blank	Did not practice (DNP)
Blank	Did not arrive (DNA)
Blank	Excluded (EX)

**Bold** – Pole
Italics – Fastest Lap

† — Drivers did not finish the race, but were classified as they completed over 75% of the race distance.

=== Teams' Championship ===
Pos	Team	MIS (Italy)		BRN (Czech Republic)		ADR (Italy)		IMO (Italy)		MUG (Italy)		VAL (Italy)		MNZ (Italy)		Pts
1	(Italy) Ebimotors	1	3	3	7	4	1	1	2	2	2	2	2	1	1	188
2	(Italy) Antonelli Motorsport	4	1	2	1	3	12	4	Ret	1	1	1	1	2	4	175
3	(Italy) Petricorse Motorsport	7	2	1	6	1	6	2	3	3	5	9	5	7	Ret	133
4	(Italy) AB Racing	5	7	8	4	2	4	6	1	7	7	7	12	8	3	116
5	(Italy) Bonaldi Motorsport	9	5	7	5	5	3	7	13	5	4	6	13	5	7	103
6	(Italy) Erre Esse Motorsport	12	10	10	8	9	10	19†	7	10	8	8	10	9	9	56
7	(Italy) Centro Porsche Padova	3	4	5	2	Ret	13	15	Ret	15	20			14	8	55
8	(Italy) GDL Racing	11	11	14	13	7	7	Ret	6	16†	10	10	Ret	11	10	45
9	(Italy) GT Motorsport by Autotecnica Tadini	19	19	16	18	13	Ret	13	12	14	21	19†	15	17	13	28
10	(Italy) Star Cars							14	10	Ret	18	18†	14	18	15	13
Pos	Team	MIS (Italy)		BRN (Czech Republic)		ADR (Italy)		IMO (Italy)		MUG (Italy)		VAL (Italy)		MNZ (Italy)		Pts

Colour	Result
Gold	Winner
Silver	Second place
Bronze	Third place
Green	Points classification
Blue	Non-points classification
Blue	Non-classified finish (NC)
Purple	Retired, not classified (Ret)
Red	Did not qualify (DNQ)
Red	Did not pre-qualify (DNPQ)
Black	Disqualified (DSQ)
White	Did not start (DNS)
White	Withdrew (WD)
White	Race cancelled (C)
Blank	Did not practice (DNP)
Blank	Did not arrive (DNA)
Blank	Excluded (EX)

**Bold** – Pole
Italics – Fastest Lap

† — Drivers did not finish the race, but were classified as they completed over 75% of the race distance.

=== Silver Cup ===
The Silver Cup is the trophy reserved to the gentlemen drivers.

Pos	Driver	Team	Points
1	(Italy) Alessandro Bonacini	Ebimotors	131
2	(Italy) Gianluca Carboni	Petricorse	49
3	(Italy) Federico de Nora	Bonaldi	27
4	(Italy) Davide Roda	Erre Esse	27
5	(Italy) Alan Simoni	Petricorse	25
6	(Italy) Massimo Giondi	Antonelli	20
7	(Italy) Andrea Pagliai	Petricorse	19
8	(Italy) Vitaliano Maccario	Porsche Padova	16
9	(Italy) Sergio Parato	Star Cars	9
10	(Ukraine) Oleksandr Gaidai	GDL	8
11	(Italy) Pier Giacomo Cappella	AB Racing	8
12	(Italy) Emanuele Busnelli	Petricorse	7
13	(Italy) Franco Greco	Petricorse	5
14	(Italy) Alberto Bresci	Porsche Padova	5
15	(Italy) Alberto de Amicis	Star Cars	5
	(Italy) Alessandro Tedeschini	Star Cars	0
	(Italy) Raffaele Giannoni	Star Cars	0
	(Italy) Eugenio Amos	Bonaldi	0
