= Rolf Ineichen =

Swiss racing driver

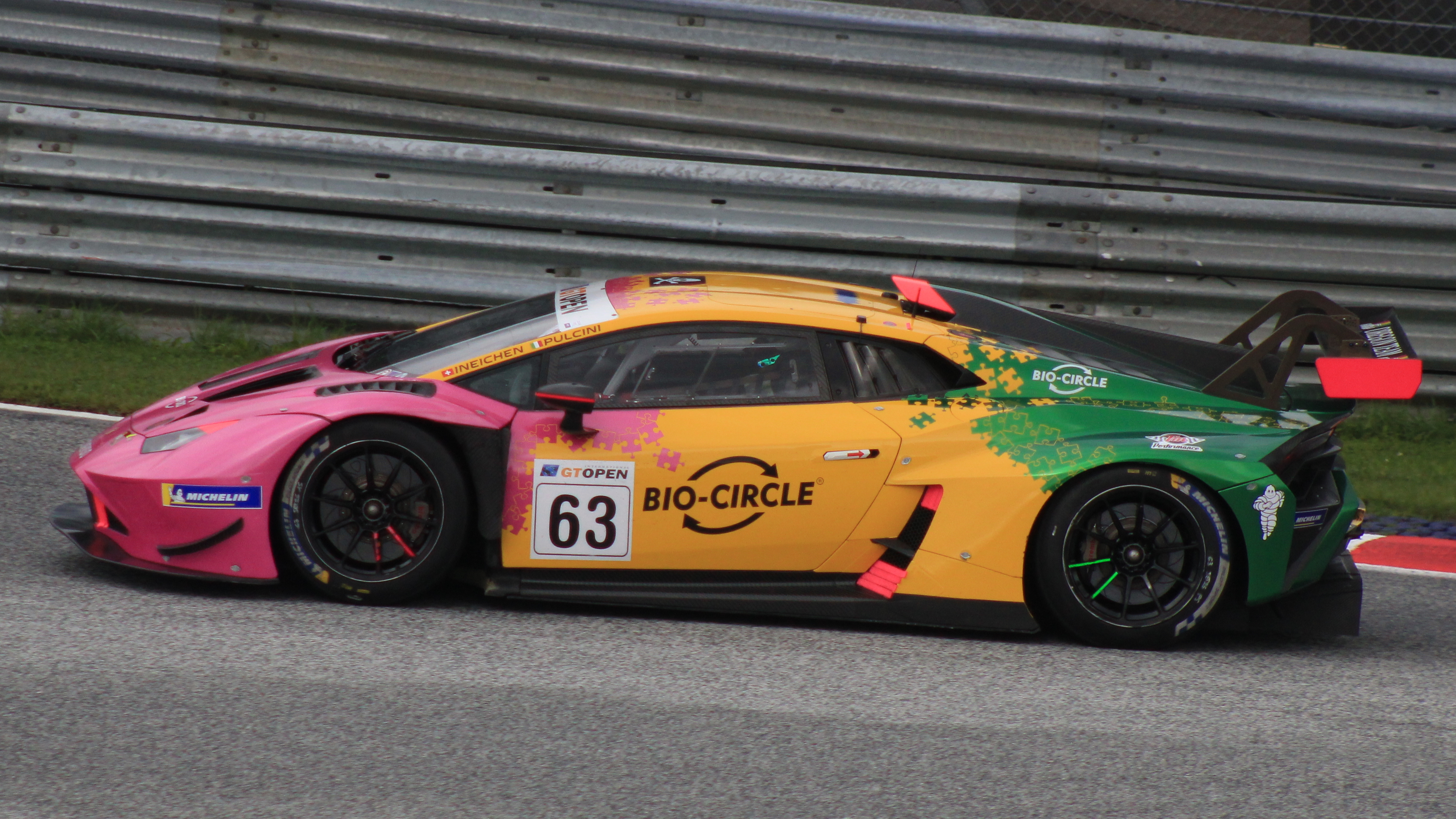
- Nationality: (Switzerland) Swiss
- Born: Rolf Melchior Ineichen; 2 May 1978 (age 48) Sursee, Switzerland

GT World Challenge Europe career
- Debut season: 2016
- Current team: Emil Frey Racing
- Categorisation: FIA Silver (until 2026); FIA Bronze (2027–)
- Car number: 14
- Former teams: Grasser Racing Team; W Racing Team

Previous series
- 2009, 2013–2015 2014–2015: Porsche Carrera Cup Germany Porsche Supercup

Championship titles
- 2013 2014 2015 2021: Porsche Carrera Cup Germany – B-Class; Porsche Carrera Cup Germany – Class B Porsche Carrera Cup Germany – B-Class; GT World Challenge Europe Endurance Cup – Silver Cup

Rolf Melchior Ineichen (born 2 May 1978) is a Swiss racing driver who currently competes in the GT World Challenge Europe Endurance Cup.

== Career ==
=== Business ventures ===
Ineichen serves on the board of directors at OTTO'S AG, a Swiss discount department store chain, as well as Proresa SA, a Swiss real estate corporation.

=== Racing ===
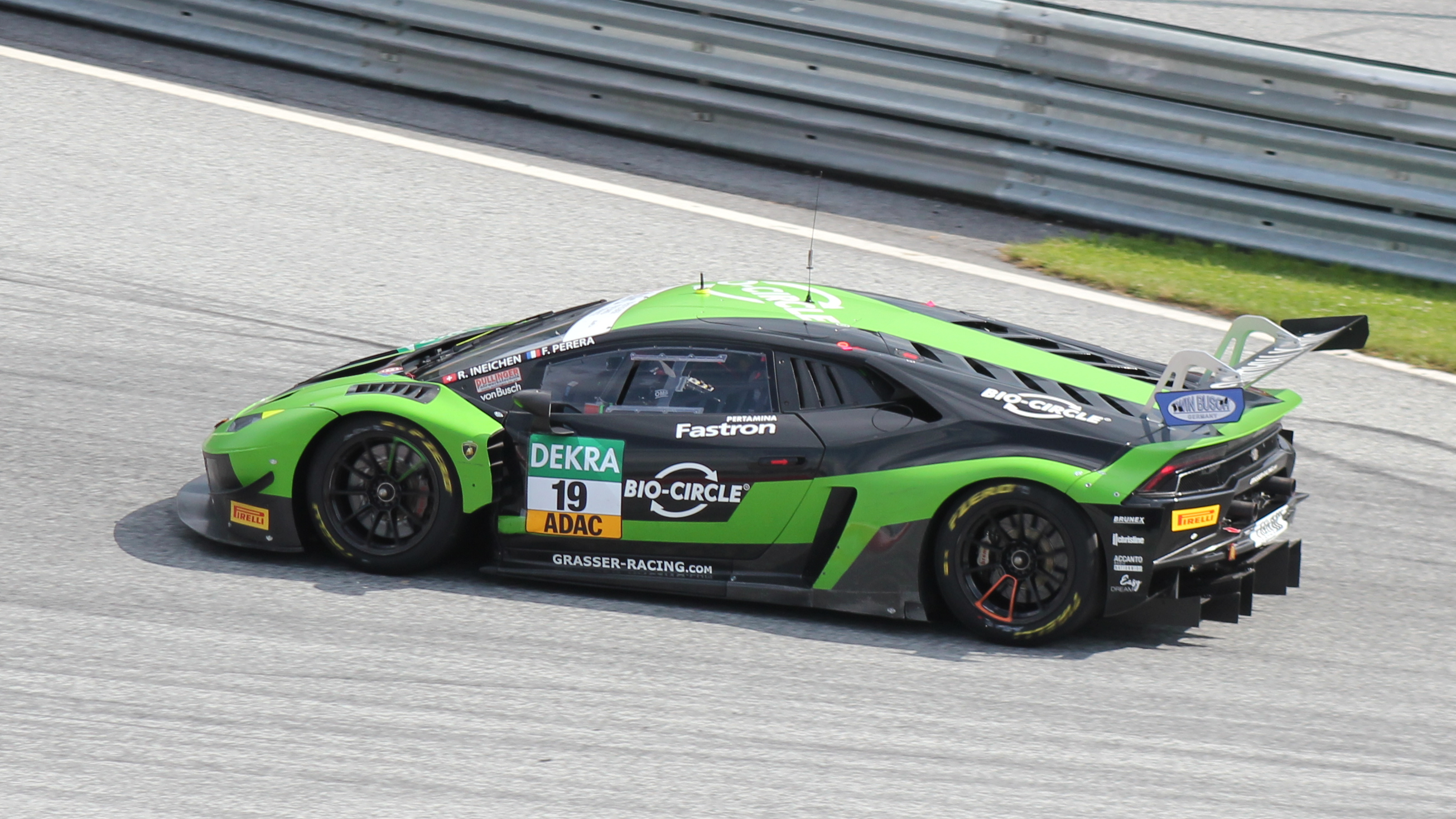
Ineichen competing for GRT Grasser Racing Team in 2021

Ineichen began his professional racing career in 2009, competing in a one-off event for ARAXA Racing in the Porsche Carrera Cup Germany. After a three year hiatus, he returned to compete with Stadler Motorsport at the Dubai 24 Hour, finishing sixth overall.

The following year, Ineichen began competing full time for the first time in his career, driving for Konrad Motorsport in the exclusively-Amateur B Class of the Porsche Carrera Cup Germany. In his inaugural full-time year of competition, Ineichen scored the class championship, winning eight of 17 races. In 2014, Ineichen won the class title for the second consecutive season, adding a class victory with Stadler Motorsport at the 2014 Dubai 24 Hour to his resume that same year. For the third consecutive season, in 2015, Ineichen claimed the Porsche Carrera Cup Germany B-Class title.

In 2016, Ineichen joined Grasser Racing Team for the ADAC GT Masters and Blancpain Endurance Series seasons. He would tally one victory in his opening season in the Blancpain series, taking victory at the Nürburgring with co-driver Mirko Bortolotti.

In 2018, Ineichen was part of the Grasser Racing Team entry that won the GTD class at the 24 Hours of Daytona. The following season, Ineichen claimed his second class victory in as many seasons at Daytona, also taking class honors at the 12 Hours of Sebring.

For 2021, Ineichen joined Swiss outfit Emil Frey Racing for the 2021 GT World Challenge Europe Endurance Cup season, driving alongside Alex Fontana and Ricardo Feller in the Silver Cup class. Scoring two class victories in five races, the trio claimed the Silver Cup title that season. The following season, he took on a drive in the DTM after it transitioned to a GT3-based formula. Ineichen finished the season with just one championship point, earned by claiming the fastest lap at Spa. In June, he competed at the 24 Hours of Le Mans in an LMP2 entry fielded by Team WRT.

2023 saw Ineichen return full-time to the GT World Challenge Europe Endurance Cup following his 2021 title, taking part in the Gold Cup class for Iron Lynx alongside Michele Beretta and Leonardo Pulcini. In the Sprint Cup, he joined Yuki Nemoto in Vincenzo Sospiri Racing's Silver Cup #119 entry.

== Racing record ==
=== Career summary ===
Season	Series	Team	Races	Wins	Poles	F/Laps	Podiums	Points	Position
2009	Porsche Carrera Cup Germany	ARAXA Racing	1	0	0	0	0	0	NC†
2012	24H Series - A6-GT	Stadler Motorsport	1	0	0	0	0	?	?
2013	Porsche Carrera Cup Germany - B-Class	Konrad Motorsport	16	8	8	9	15	284	**1st**
2014	Porsche Carrera Cup Germany - B-Class	Konrad Motorsport	17	12	12	14	13	284	**1st**
2014	Porsche Supercup	Konrad Motorsport	3	0	0	0	0	0	NC†
2014	Porsche GT3 Cup Challenge Central Europe	Konrad Motorsport	2	0	0	2	0	0	NC
2014	United SportsCar Championship - GTD	Dempsey Racing	2	0	0	0	0	26	66th
2014	24H Series - A6-Pro	Stadler Motorsport	1	1	0	0	1	?	?
2015	Porsche Carrera Cup Germany - B-Class	Konrad Motorsport	17	14	15	14	15	296	**1st**
2015	United SportsCar Championship - GTD	Konrad Motorsport	1	0	0	0	0	1	61st
2015	Nürburgring Endurance Series - SP7	Konrad Motorsport	1	0	0	0	1	0	NC
2015	Porsche Supercup	Konrad Motorsport	1	0	0	0	0	0	NC
2015	24H Series - A6-Pro	Stadler Motorsport	1	0	0	0	0	6	90th
2016	ADAC GT Masters	GRT Grasser Racing Team	14	1	0	0	2	91	7th
2016	Blancpain Endurance Series	GRT Grasser Racing Team	5	1	0	0	2	49	7th
2016	British GT Championship - GT3	GRT Grasser Racing Team	1	0	0	0	0	15	17th
2016	Lamborghini Super Trofeo Europe - Pro	Bonaldi Motorsport	2	0	1	0	0	29	10th
2016	IMSA SportsCar Championship - GTD	Konrad Motorsport	1	0	0	0	0	22	50th
2016	24H Series - A6	Konrad Motorsport	3	0	1	0	2	65	6th
2016	24H Series - A6	GRT Grasser Racing Team	3	0	1	0	2	65	6th
2017	ADAC GT Masters	GRT Grasser Racing Team	12	2	0	0	3	95	7th
2017	24H Series - A6	GRT Grasser Racing Team	2	0	0	0	0	10	35th
2017	IMSA SportsCar Championship - GTD	GRT Grasser Racing Team	2	0	0	0	0	38	50th
2017	Blancpain GT Series Sprint Cup	GRT Grasser Racing Team	2	0	0	0	0	0	NC
2017	Blancpain GT Series Endurance Cup	GRT Grasser Racing Team	1	0	0	0	0	0	NC
2017	Intercontinental GT Challenge	GRT Grasser Racing Team	1	0	0	0	0	0	NC
2018	ADAC GT Masters	GRT Grasser Racing Team	14	0	0	0	2	39	17th
2018	IMSA SportsCar Championship - GTD	GRT Grasser Racing Team	1	1	0	0	1	35	45th
2018	Blancpain GT Series Endurance Cup	GRT Grasser Racing Team	5	0	0	0	0	0	NC
2018	24H Series - A6	GRT Grasser Racing Team	2	0	0	0	1	0	NC
2019	ADAC GT Masters	Orange1 by GRT Grasser	14	0	0	0	3	89	10th
2019	Blancpain GT Series Endurance Cup	GRT Grasser Racing Team	4	0	2	0	0	21	13th
2019	Blancpain GT World Challenge Europe	GRT Grasser Racing Team	2	0	0	0	0	0	NC
2019	24H Series European Championship - A6	GRT Grasser Racing Team	2	0	0	0	1	14	22nd
2019	IMSA SportsCar Championship - GTD	GRT Grasser Racing Team	2	2	0	0	2	70	35th
2020	24H Series Continents Championship - GT3-Pro	Belgian Audi Club Team WRT	1	0	0	0	0	22	7th
2020	GT World Challenge Europe Endurance Cup	Belgian Audi Club Team WRT	2	0	0	0	0	27	11th
2020	GT World Challenge Europe Sprint Cup	Belgian Audi Club Team WRT	2	0	0	0	0	3.5	13th
2020	ADAC GT Masters	Team WRT	10	0	0	0	2	62	14th
2020	IMSA SportsCar Championship - GTD	WRT Speedstar Audi Sport	1	0	0	0	1	30	42nd
2021	GT World Challenge Europe Endurance Cup	Emil Frey Racing	5	0	0	0	1	19	14th
2021	GT World Challenge Europe Endurance Cup - Silver	Emil Frey Racing	5	2	2	2	3	91	**1st**
2021	Intercontinental GT Challenge	Emil Frey Racing	1	0	0	0	0	0	NC
2021	ADAC GT Masters	GRT Grasser Racing Team	14	1	0	0	3	135	7th
2021	IMSA SportsCar Championship - GTD	GRT Grasser Racing Team	2	0	0	0	1	160	74th
2021	24H Series - GT3-Pro	GRT Grasser Racing Team	1	0	0	0	0	21	NC
2022	Deutsche Tourenwagen Masters	GRT	13	0	0	1	0	1	27th
2022	IMSA SportsCar Championship - GTD	TR3 Racing	1	0	1	0	0	225	36th
2022	24H GT Series - GT3	Barwell Motorsport							
2022	24 Hours of Le Mans - LMP2	Team WRT	1	0	0	0	0	N/A	11th
2023	IMSA SportsCar Championship - GTD	Iron Lynx	1	0	0	0	0	190	60th
2023	GT World Challenge Europe Endurance Cup	Iron Lynx	4	0	0	0	0	0	NC
2023	GT World Challenge Europe Sprint Cup	VSR	4	0	0	0	0	0	NC
2024	International GT Open	Oregon Team	7	0	0	0	1	35	13th
2025	GT World Challenge Europe Endurance Cup	Herberth Motorsport	4	0	0	0	0	0	NC
2026	24H Series - GT3	Herberth Motorsport	1	0	0	0	1	36	29th
2026	GT World Challenge Europe Endurance Cup	JMW Motorsport	3	0	0	0	0	0	NC

^{*} Season still in progress.

=== Complete IMSA SportsCar Championship results ===
(key) (Races in bold indicate pole position; races in italics indicate fastest lap)

Year	Entrant	Class	Chassis	Engine	1	2	3	4	5	6	7	8	9	10	11	12	Rank	Points
2014	Dempsey Racing	GTD	Porsche 911 GT America	Porsche 4.0 L Flat-6	DAY; 21	SEB; 21	LGA	DET	WGL	MOS	IND	ELK	VIR	COA	PET		26th	66
2015	Konrad Motorsport	GTD	Porsche 911 GT America	Porsche 4.0 L Flat-6	DAY; 19	SEB	LGA	BEL	WGL	LIM	ELK	VIR	AUS	ATL			61st	1
2016	Konrad Motorsport	GTD	Lamborghini Huracán GT3	Lamborghini 5.2 L V10	DAY; 10	SEB	LGA	BEL	WGL	MOS	LIM	ELK	VIR	AUS	PET		50th	22
2017	GRT Grasser Racing Team	GTD	Lamborghini Huracán GT3	Lamborghini 5.2 L V10	DAY; 15	SEB; 9	LBH	AUS	BEL	WGL	MOS	LIM	ELK	VIR	LGA	PET	50th	38
2018	GRT Grasser Racing Team	GTD	Lamborghini Huracán GT3	Lamborghini 5.2 L V10	DAY; 1	SEB	MOH	BEL	WGL	MOS	LIM	ELK	VIR	LGA	PET		45th	35
2019	GRT Grasser Racing Team	GTD	Lamborghini Huracán GT3 Evo	Lamborghini 5.2 L V10	DAY; 1	SEB; 1	MDO	DET	WGL	MOS	LIM	ELK	VIR	LGA	PET		35th	70
2020	WRT Speedstar Audi Sport	GTD	Audi R8 LMS Evo	Audi 5.2 L V10	DAY; 3	DAY	SEB	ELK	VIR	ATL	MDO	CLT	PET	LGA	SEB		41st	30
2021	GRT Grasser Racing Team	GTD	Lamborghini Huracán GT3 Evo	Lamborghini 5.2 L V10	DAY; 18	SEB	MDO	DET	WGL	WGL	LIM	ELK	LGA	LBH	VIR	PET	34th	160
2022	TR3 Racing	GTD Pro	Lamborghini Huracán GT3 Evo	Lamborghini 5.2 L V10	**DAY**; 12	SEB	LBH	LGA	WGL	MOS	LIM	ELK	VIR	PET			36th	225
2023	Iron Lynx	GTD	Lamborghini Huracán GT3 Evo 2	Lamborghini 5.2 L V10	DAY; 12	SEB	LBH	MON	WGL	MOS	LIM	ELK	VIR	IMS	PET		60th	190

=== Complete GT World Challenge Europe results ===
==== GT World Challenge Europe Endurance Cup ====
(key) (Races in bold indicate pole position; races in italics indicate fastest lap)

Year	Team	Car	Class	1	2	3	4	5	6	7	Pos.	Points
2016	GRT Grasser Racing Team	Lamborghini Huracán GT3	Pro	MNZ; 8	**SIL**; 3	LEC; Ret	SPA; 6H; 10	SPA; 12H; 6	SPA; 24H; 11	NÜR; 1	7th	49
2017	GRT Grasser Racing Team	Lamborghini Huracán GT3	Pro	MNZ	SIL	LEC	SPA; 6H; 33	SPA; 12H; 22	SPA; 24H; 18	CAT	NC	0
2018	GRT Grasser Racing Team	Lamborghini Huracán GT3	Pro	MNZ; 20	SIL; 17	LEC; 39	SPA; 6H; 14	SPA; 12H; 27	SPA; 24H; Ret	CAT; Ret	NC	0
2019	GRT Grasser Racing Team	Lamborghini Huracán GT3 Evo	Pro	**MNZ**; 40	**SIL**; 36	LEC; 7	SPA; 6H; 2	SPA; 12H; 6	SPA; 24H; 16	CAT	13th	21
2020	Belgian Audi Club Team WRT	Audi R8 LMS Evo	Pro	IMO	NÜR; 4	SPA; 6H	SPA; 12H	SPA; 24H	LEC; 5		11th	27
2021	Emil Frey Racing	Lamborghini Huracán GT3 Evo	Silver	**MON**; 3	LEC; 13	**SPA**; **6H**; 14	**SPA**; **12H**; 38	**SPA**; **24H**; 31	NÜR; 8	CAT; 20	**1st**	**91**
2023	Iron Lynx	Lamborghini Huracán GT3 Evo 2	Gold	MNZ; Ret	LEC; 34	SPA; 6H; 30	SPA; 12H; 48	SPA; 24H; Ret	NÜR; 12	CAT	10th	43
2025	Herberth Motorsport	Porsche 911 GT3 R (992)	Gold	LEC; 20	MNZ; Ret	SPA; 6H; 50	SPA; 12H; 31	**SPA**; **24H**; 51†	NÜR; 23	CAT	10th	30
2026	JMW Motorsport	Ferrari 296 GT3 Evo	Bronze	LEC; Ret	MNZ; 22	SPA; 6H; 36	SPA; 12H; 55†	SPA; 24H; Ret	NÜR	ALG	30th	9

==== GT World Challenge Europe Sprint Cup ====
(key) (Races in bold indicate pole position; races in italics indicate fastest lap)

Year	Team	Car	Class	1	2	3	4	5	6	7	8	9	10	Pos.	Points
2017	GRT Grasser Racing Team	Lamborghini Huracán GT3	Pro	MIS; QR	MIS; CR	BRH; QR	BRH; CR	ZOL; QR	ZOL; CR	HUN; QR	HUN; CR	NÜR; QR; 15	NÜR; CR; 29	NC	0
2019	GRT Grasser Racing Team	Lamborghini Huracán GT3 Evo	Silver	BRH; 1	BRH; 2	MIS; 1	MIS; 2	ZAN; 1; 19	ZAN; 2; 17	NÜR; 1	NÜR; 2	HUN; 1	HUN; 2	10th	9
2020	Belgian Audi Club Team WRT	Audi R8 LMS Evo	Silver	MIS; 1	MIS; 2	MIS; 3	MAG; 1	MAG; 2	ZAN; 1; 21	**ZAN**; **2**; 17	CAT; 1	CAT; 2	CAT; 3	13th	3.5
2023	VSR	Lamborghini Huracán GT3 Evo 2	Silver	BRH; 1; 22	BRH; 2; 22	MIS; 1	MIS; 2	HOC; 1; 16	HOC; 2; 21	VAL; 1	VAL; 2	ZAN; 1	ZAN; 2	12th	27

=== Complete ADAC GT Masters results ===
(key) (Races in bold indicate pole position; races in italics indicate fastest lap)

Year	Team	Car	1	2	3	4	5	6	7	8	9	10	11	12	13	14	Pos.	Points
2016	GRT Grasser Racing Team	Lamborghini Huracán GT3	OSC; 1; 8	OSC; 2; 1	SAC; 1; 12	SAC; 2; 28	LAU; 1; 2	LAU; 2 Ret	RBR; 1; 6	RBR; 2; 4	NÜR; 1; 8	NÜR; 2; 7	ZAN; 1; 20	ZAN; 2; 19	HOC; 1; 9	HOC; 2; 4	7th	91
2017	GRT Grasser Racing Team	Lamborghini Huracán GT3	OSC; 1; 9	OSC; 2; 12	LAU; 1; 15	LAU; 2; 3	RBR; 1; 18	**RBR**; **2**; 1	ZAN; 1; 7	ZAN; 2 Ret	NÜR; 1; 11	NÜR; 2; 4	SAC; 1	SAC; 2	HOC; 1; 5	HOC; 2; 1	7th	95
2018	GRT Grasser Racing Team	Lamborghini Huracán GT3	OSC; 1 DSQ	OSC; 2; 2	MST; 1; 17	MST; 2; 15	RBR; 1; 12	RBR; 2; 24	NÜR; 1; 10	NÜR; 2; 33	ZAN; 1; 9	ZAN; 2 Ret	SAC; 1 Ret	SAC; 2; 14	HOC; 1 Ret	HOC; 2; 2	17th	39
2019	Orange1 by GRT Grasser	Lamborghini Huracán GT3 Evo	OSC; 1; 20	OSC; 2; 3	MST; 1; 22	**MST**; **2**; 2	RBR; 1 Ret	RBR; 2; 7	ZAN; 1; 10	ZAN; 2; 4	NÜR; 1; 17	**NÜR**; **2** DSQ	HOC; 1; 12	HOC; 2; 3	SAC; 1; 11	SAC; 2; 22	10th	89
2020	Team WRT	Audi R8 LMS Evo	LAU; 1 Ret	LAU; 2; 7	NÜR; 1; 18	NÜR; 2; 4	HOC; 1 Ret	HOC; 2; 3	SAC; 1; 22	SAC; 2; 12	RBR; 1 WD	RBR; 2 WD	LAU; 1	LAU; 2	OSC; 1; 16	OSC; 2; 2	14th	62
2021	GRT Grasser Racing Team	Lamborghini Huracán GT3 Evo	OSC; 1; 18	OSC; 2 Ret	RBR; 1; 7	RBR; 2; 5	ZAN; 1; 17	ZAN; 2; 3	LAU; 1; 8	LAU; 2; 7	SAC; 1 Ret	SAC; 2; 4	HOC; 1; 6	**HOC**; **2**; 1	NÜR; 1; 7	NÜR; 2; 3	7th	135

=== Complete 24 Hours of Le Mans results ===
Year	Team	Co-Drivers	Car	Class	Laps	Pos.	Class Pos.
2021	(Germany) Herberth Motorsport	(Germany) Ralf Bohn (Germany) Robert Renauer	Porsche 911 RSR-19	GTE; Am	332	38th	10th
2022	(Belgium) Team WRT	(Italy) Mirko Bortolotti (Belgium) Dries Vanthoor	Oreca 07-Gibson	LMP2	366	15th	11th

=== Complete Deutsche Tourenwagen Masters results ===
(key) (Races in bold indicate pole position; races in italics indicate fastest lap)

Year	Entrant	Chassis	1	2	3	4	5	6	7	8	9	10	11	12	13	14	15	16	Rank	Points
2022	GRT	Lamborghini Huracán GT3 Evo	ALG; 1 Ret	ALG; 2 Ret	LAU; 1; 14	LAU; 2; 16	IMO; 1; 15	IMO; 2 Ret	NOR; 1	NOR; 2	NÜR; 1; 18	NÜR; 2; 17	SPA; 1; 19	SPA; 2; 17	RBR; 1; 18	RBR; 2; 23	HOC; 1 Ret	HOC; 2 DNS	27th	1

Sporting positions
Preceded by Bill Barazetti	Porsche Carrera Cup Germany; B-Class Champion; 2013, 2014, 2015	Succeeded by Wolfgang Triller
Preceded by Patrick Kujala; Alex MacDowall; Frederik Schandorff	GT World Challenge Europe Endurance Cup; Silver Cup Champion; 2021; With: Alex Fontana; Ricardo Feller	Succeeded by Incumbent
