= 2014 Porsche Carrera Cup Italia =

Motor racing competition

2014 Porsche Carrera Cup Italy

Seasons
- ← 2013 2015 →

The 2014 Porsche Carrera Cup Italia season was the eighth Porsche Carrera Cup Italy season. It began on 10 May in Misano and finished on 26 October in Monza, after seven rounds with two races at each event. Matteo Cairoli won the drivers' championship driving for Antonelli Motorsport, which won the teams' championship.

== Teams and drivers ==
Team	No.	Drivers	Class	Rounds
(Italy) Heaven Motorsport	1	(Italy) Enrico Fulgenzi		4-7
(Italy) Dinamic Motorsport	4	(Italy) Giovanni Berton		1-5, 7
(Italy) Dinamic Motorsport	4	(Italy) Alessandro Bonacini		6
(Italy) Dinamic Motorsport	67	(Italy) Alex de Giacomi	M	All
(Italy) Ghinzani Arco Motorsport	8	(Italy) Alberto de Amicis		All
(Italy) Ghinzani Arco Motorsport	22	(Italy) Matteo Torta		2
(Italy) Ghinzani Arco Motorsport	81	(Italy) Marco Cassarà	M	1, 3–7
(Italy) Ebimotors	9	(Italy) Edoardo Liberati	S	All
(Italy) Ebimotors	23	(Italy) Vito Postiglione		1-2, 4-7
(Italy) Ebimotors	23	(Italy) Massimo Monti		3
(Italy) Cardeco Racing	11	(Italy) Gianluca Giraudi		All
(Italy) Cardeco Racing	55	(Italy) Glauco Solieri	M	3-4, 6
(San Marino) Tsunami Racing Team	13	(Ukraine) Oleksandr Gaidai		All
(Switzerland) Sportec Motorsport	14	(Russia) Rinat Salikhov		All
(Switzerland) Sportec Motorsport	15	(Russia) Ilya Melnikov	S	All
(Italy) Antonelli Motorsport	16	(Italy) Matteo Cairoli	S	All
(Italy) Antonelli Motorsport	58	(Italy) Angelo Proietti	M	All
(Italy) Antonelli Motorsport	64	(Italy) Pietro Negra	M	All
(Italy) Antonelli Motorsport	90	(Italy) Davide Roda	M	1-5
(Italy) GT Motorsport by Autotecnica Tadini	91	(Italy) Walter Ben	M	All

Icon	Class
M	Michelin Cup
S	Scholarship Programme

== Race calendar and results ==
Round		Circuit	Date	Pole position	Fastest lap	Winning driver	Winning team
1	R1	(Italy) Misano World Circuit Marco Simoncelli, Misano Adriatico	10 May	(Italy) Vito Postiglione	(Italy) Vito Postiglione	(Italy) Vito Postiglione	(Italy) Ebimotors
1	R2	(Italy) Misano World Circuit Marco Simoncelli, Misano Adriatico	11 May		(Italy) Matteo Cairoli	(Italy) Matteo Cairoli	(Italy) Antonelli Motorsport
2	R1	(Italy) Autodromo Nazionale Monza, Monza	31 May	(Italy) Gianluca Giraudi	(Italy) Gianluca Giraudi	(Italy) Gianluca Giraudi	(Italy) Cardeco Racing
2	R2	(Italy) Autodromo Nazionale Monza, Monza	1 June		(Italy) Matteo Cairoli	(Italy) Vito Postiglione	(Italy) Ebimotors
3	R1	(Italy) Autodromo Internazionale del Mugello, Scarperia	12 July	(Italy) Gianluca Giraudi	(Italy) Gianluca Giraudi	(Italy) Matteo Cairoli	(Italy) Antonelli Motorsport
3	R2	(Italy) Autodromo Internazionale del Mugello, Scarperia	13 July		(Italy) Alberto de Amicis	(Italy) Alberto de Amicis	(Italy) Ghinzani Arco Motorsport
4	R1	(France) Circuit Paul Ricard, Le Castellet	31 August	(Italy) Matteo Cairoli	(Italy) Matteo Cairoli	(Italy) Matteo Cairoli	(Italy) Antonelli Motorsport
4	R2	(France) Circuit Paul Ricard, Le Castellet	31 August		(Ukraine) Oleksandr Gaidai	(Italy) Matteo Cairoli	(Italy) Antonelli Motorsport
5	R1	(Italy) ACI Vallelunga Circuit, Campagnano	13 September	(Italy) Matteo Cairoli	(Italy) Matteo Cairoli	(Italy) Matteo Cairoli	(Italy) Antonelli Motorsport
5	R2	(Italy) ACI Vallelunga Circuit, Campagnano	14 September		(Italy) Matteo Cairoli	(Italy) Gianluca Giraudi	(Italy) Cardeco Racing
6	R1	(Italy) Autodromo Enzo e Dino Ferrari, Imola	11 October	(Italy) Matteo Cairoli	(Italy) Edoardo Liberati	(Italy) Vito Postiglione	(Italy) Ebimotors
6	R2	(Italy) Autodromo Enzo e Dino Ferrari, Imola	12 October		(Italy) Vito Postiglione	(Italy) Vito Postiglione	(Italy) Ebimotors
7	R1	(Italy) Autodromo Nazionale Monza, Monza	25 October	(Italy) Matteo Cairoli	(Italy) Vito Postiglione	(Italy) Matteo Cairoli	(Italy) Antonelli Motorsport
7	R2	(Italy) Autodromo Nazionale Monza, Monza	26 October		(Italy) Matteo Cairoli	(Italy) Edoardo Liberati	(Italy) Ebimotors

== Championship standings ==
Points system
	**1st**	**2nd**	**3rd**	**4th**	**5th**	**6th**	**7th**	**8th**	**9th**	**10th**	**Pole**	FL
Race 1	20	15	12	10	8	6	4	3	2	1	2	1
Race 2	15	10	8	6	4	3	2	1				1

=== Drivers' Championship ===
Pos	Driver	MIS (Italy)		MNZ (Italy)		MUG (Italy)		LEC (France)		VAL (Italy)		IMO (Italy)		MNZ (Italy)		Pts
1	(Italy) Matteo Cairoli	3	1	3	3	1	3	**1**	1	**1**	2	**2**	8	**1**	2	200
2	(Italy) Vito Postiglione	**1**	6	2	1			9	11	3	3	1	1	2	Ret	130
3	(Italy) Gianluca Giraudi	7	9	**1**	4	**4**	2	5	4	4	1	4	4	5	3	127
4	(Italy) Edoardo Liberati	2	4	4	2	7	4	2	2	Ret	Ret	3	2	3	1	126
5	(Italy) Alberto de Amicis	9	5	5	6	5	1	6	**5**	8	10	8	14	Ret	7	59
6	(Ukraine) Oleksandr Gaidai	4	8	8	5	2	13	3	8	12	8	7	5	8	**Ret**	59
7	(Italy) Enrico Fulgenzi							4	Ret	2	4	6	**3**	Ret	4	51
8	(Italy) Alex de Giacomi	5	2	Ret	7	9	6	Ret	9	5	6	13	11	6	5	46
9	(Russia) Ilya Melnikov	10	13	6	**8**	6	**5**	7	6	9	9	5	Ret	Ret	6	38
10	(Italy) Giovanni Berton	6	**3**	7	DSQ	8	7	10	3	10	7			4	12	36
11	(Italy) Angelo Proietti	13	7	9	11	Ret	Ret	11	10	6	**5**	11	10	9	8	17
12	(Italy) Massimo Monti					3	Ret									12
13	(Italy) Pietro Negra	8	14	Ret	9	14	12	14	14	7	13†	9	7	Ret	10	11
14	(Russia) Rinat Salikhov	12	11	11	Ret	12	8	8	7	Ret	Ret	12	9	7	11	10
15	(Italy) Marco Cassarà	14	10			11	9	13	13	11	11	10	6	Ret	9	4
16	(Italy) Davide Roda	11	12	10	Ret	Ret	10	Ret	Ret	DSQ	Ret					1
17	(Italy) Walter Ben	15	15	12	10	13	11	15	15	13	12	15	13	10	13	1
18	(Italy) Glauco Solieri					10	Ret	12	12			14	12			1
	(Italy) Matteo Torta			13†	Ret											0
	(Italy) Alessandro Bonacini											16†	Ret			0
Pos	Driver	MIS (Italy)		MNZ (Italy)		MUG (Italy)		LEC (France)		VAL (Italy)		IMO (Italy)		MNZ (Italy)		Pts

Colour	Result
Gold	Winner
Silver	Second place
Bronze	Third place
Green	Points classification
Blue	Non-points classification
Blue	Non-classified finish (NC)
Purple	Retired, not classified (Ret)
Red	Did not qualify (DNQ)
Red	Did not pre-qualify (DNPQ)
Black	Disqualified (DSQ)
White	Did not start (DNS)
White	Withdrew (WD)
White	Race cancelled (C)
Blank	Did not practice (DNP)
Blank	Did not arrive (DNA)
Blank	Excluded (EX)

**Bold** – Pole
Italics – Fastest Lap

† — Drivers did not finish the race, but were classified as they completed over 75% of the race distance.

=== Teams' Championship ===
Pos	Team	MIS (Italy)		MNZ (Italy)		MUG (Italy)		LEC (France)		VAL (Italy)		IMO (Italy)		MNZ (Italy)		Pts
1	(Italy) Antonelli Motorsport	3	1	3	3	1	3	1	1	1	2	2	7	1	2	187
2	(Italy) Ebimotors	1	4	2	1	3	4	2	2	3	3	1	1	2	1	184
3	(Italy) Cadeco Racing	7	9	1	4	4	2	5	4	4	1	4	4	5	3	121
4	(Italy) Ghinzani Arco Motorsport	9	5	5	6	5	1	6	5	8	10	8	6	Ret	7	61
5	(San Marino) Tsunami Racing Team	4	8	8	5	2	13	3	8	12	8	7	5	8	Ret	58
6	(Italy) Dinamic Motorsport	5	2	7	7	8	6	10	3	5	6	13	11	4	12	36
7	(Italy) Heaven Motorsport							4	Ret	2	4	6	3	Ret	4	51
8	(Switzerland) Sportec Motorsport	10	11	6	8	6	5	7	6	9	9	5	9	7	6	42
9	(Italy) GT Autosport by Autotecnica Tadini	15	15	12	10	13	11	15	15	13	12	15	13	10	13	1
Pos	Team	MIS (Italy)		MNZ (Italy)		MUG (Italy)		LEC (France)		VAL (Italy)		IMO (Italy)		MNZ (Italy)		Pts

Colour	Result
Gold	Winner
Silver	Second place
Bronze	Third place
Green	Points classification
Blue	Non-points classification
Blue	Non-classified finish (NC)
Purple	Retired, not classified (Ret)
Red	Did not qualify (DNQ)
Red	Did not pre-qualify (DNPQ)
Black	Disqualified (DSQ)
White	Did not start (DNS)
White	Withdrew (WD)
White	Race cancelled (C)
Blank	Did not practice (DNP)
Blank	Did not arrive (DNA)
Blank	Excluded (EX)

**Bold** – Pole
Italics – Fastest Lap

=== Michelin Cup ===
The Michelin Cup is the trophy reserved to the gentlemen drivers.

Pos	Driver	Team	Points
1	(Italy) Alex de Giacomi	Dinamic	102
2	(Italy) Angelo Proietti	Antonelli	74
3	(Italy) Marco Cassarà	Ghinzani	50
4	(Italy) Pietro Negra	Antonelli	49
5	(Italy) Walter Ben	GT Motorsport	31
6	(Italy) Glauco Solieri	Cardeco	20
7	(Italy) Davide Roda	Antonelli	17

=== Porsche Carrera Cup Italia Scholarship Programme ===
The Scholarship Programme Cup is the trophy reserved to the under-26 drivers elected by Porsche at the beginning of the season.

Pos	Driver	Team	Points
1	(Italy) Matteo Cairoli	Antonelli	200
2	(Italy) Edoardo Liberati	Ebimotors	126
3	(Russia) Ilya Melnikov	Sportec	38
