= Matteo Cairoli =

Italian racing driver (born 1996)

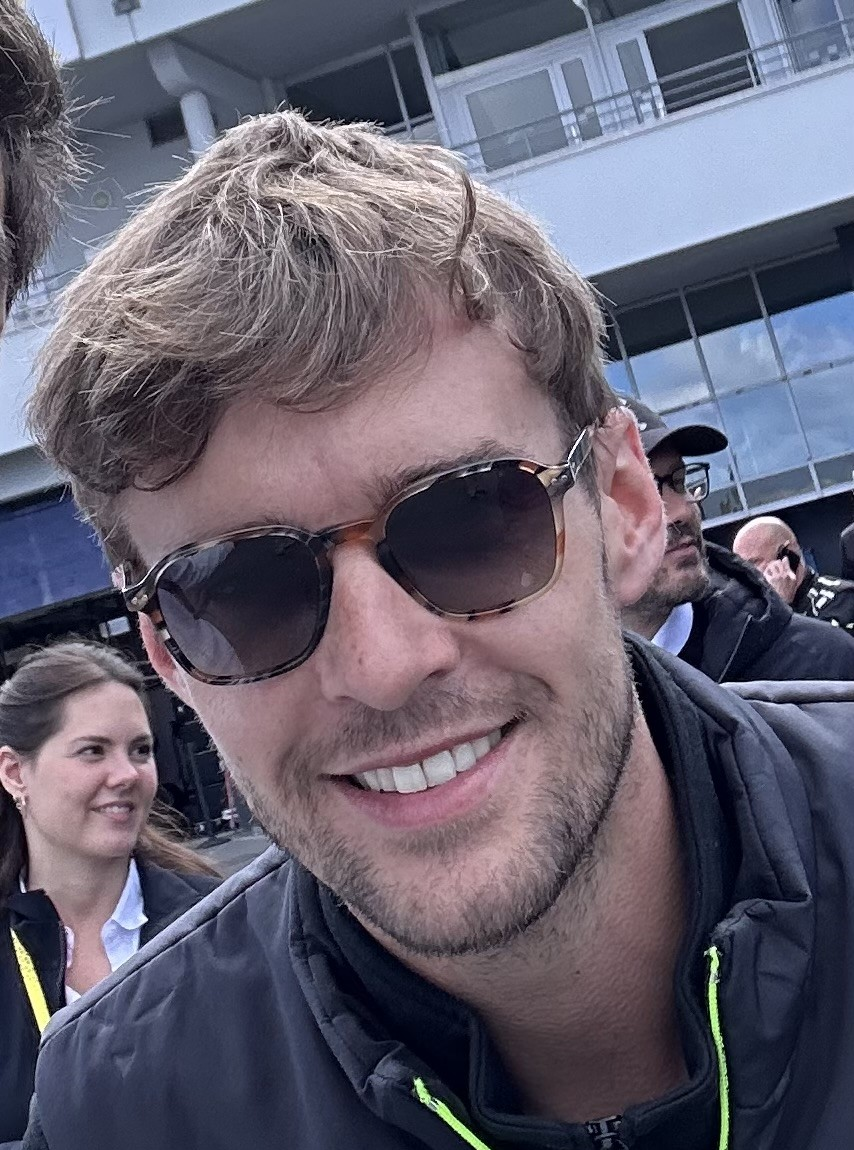
- Cairoli in 2024
- Nationality: (Italy) Italian
- Born: 1 June 1996 (age 30) Como, Italy

FIA World Endurance Championship career
- Debut season: 2017
- Current team: Iron Lynx
- Categorisation: FIA Silver (until 2016); FIA Gold (2017–2022); FIA Platinum (2023–)
- Car number: 60
- Former teams: Dempsey-Proton Racing; Team Project 1
- Starts: 24
- Wins: 2
- Podiums: 9
- Poles: 6

Previous series
- 2016–2019 2014–2016 2017-2024: European Le Mans Series; Porsche Supercup; IMSA SportsCar Championship

Championship titles
- 2014: Porsche Carrera Cup Italy

Matteo Cairoli (born 1 June 1996) is an Italian racing driver who competes in the Deutsche Tourenwagen Masters for Emil Frey Racing.

A homegrown Porsche talent since 2014, Cairoli developed into one of the leading LMGTE Am drivers, and was FIA World Endurance Championship runner-up for Dempsey-Proton in 2017. He later won the 2021 24 Hours of Nürburgring for Manthey and took pole at the 2023 24 Hours of Spa. In 2024, Cairoli moved to Lamborghini to graduate to LMDh in the IMSA SportsCar Championship, and won once for Iron Lynx in ELMS as an LMP2 rookie.

Cairoli finished runner-up in the GT World Challenge Europe Endurance Cup for Mercedes-AMG in 2025, before taking three DTM victories on his Ferrari debut in 2026.

== Career ==
=== Junior formula ===
Cairoli began his single-seater racing career in 2012, competing in the Italian Formula Renault Championship. He would finish the season 13th in points after competing in the final four races, scoring one podium. After a 2013 season in which he competed in the German Formula Three Championship, Cairoli joined GSK Grand Prix for the 2014 Formula Renault 2.0 Alps Series season. However, he would only compete in the first round at Imola before leaving the team.

=== Sports cars ===
After competing in junior formula competition, Cairoli moved to sports cars in 2014, taking part in the Porsche Carrera Cup Italia with Antonelli Motorsport. It was a successful first season, as Cairoli took the series title by 70 points, winning six of the fourteen races. As a result, he was invited to compete for the Porsche International Cup Scholarship, which he won, receiving €200,000 and Porsche Junior driver status for 2015. As part of the 2015 Porsche Junior driver class, Cairoli was awarded a seat in the Porsche Supercup and Porsche Carrera Cup Germany for that season, signing with Project 1 Motorsport in both series. At the end of 2016, following a second-placed points finish in the 2016 Porsche Supercup, Cairoli was further promoted in the Porsche system to "Young Professional" status.

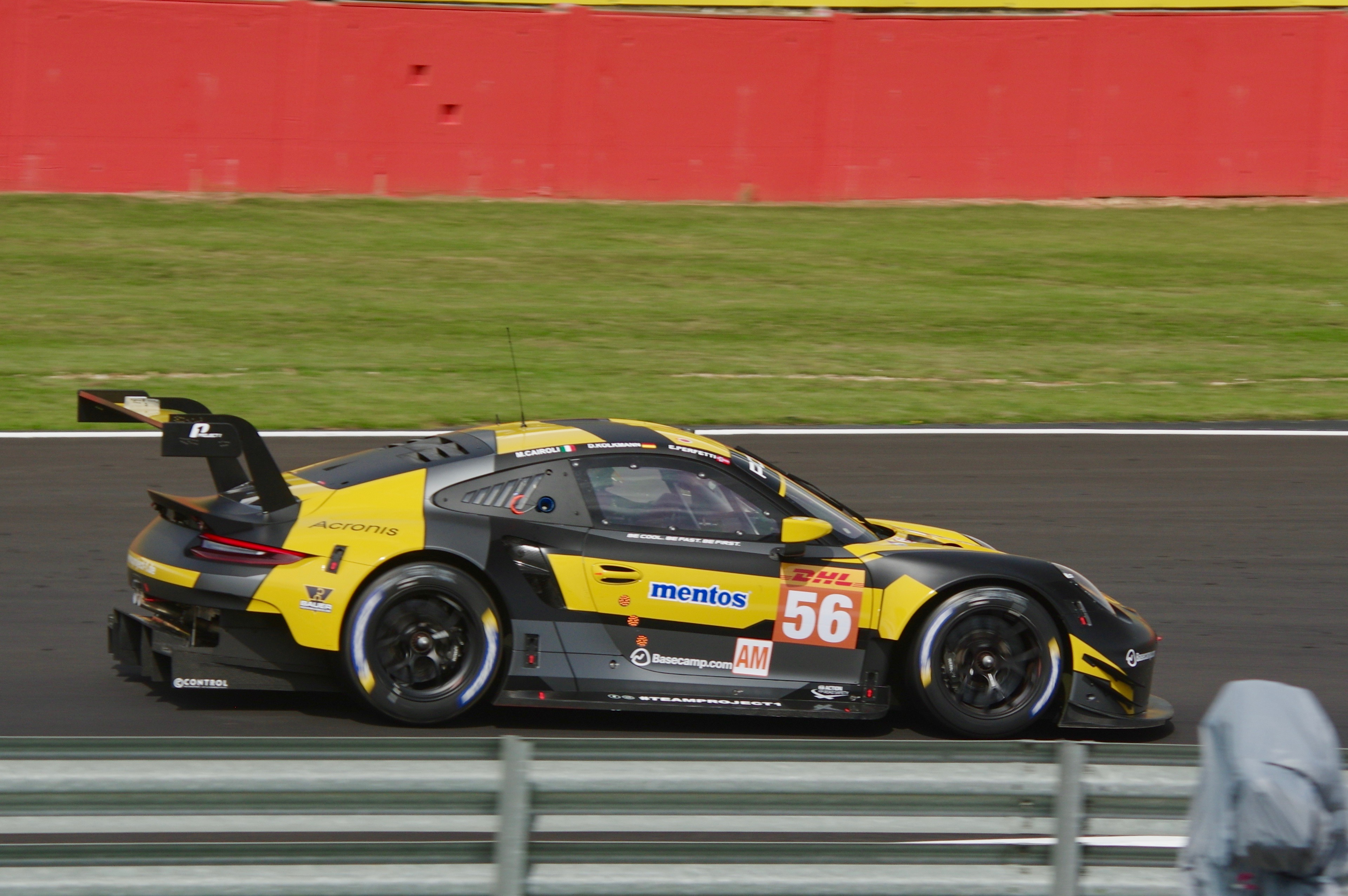
Cairoli competing for Team Project 1 at Silverstone in 2019

In 2017, Cairoli stepped up to compete for Dempsey-Proton Racing in the LMGTE Am class of the FIA World Endurance Championship. The opportunity provided him with his first appearance at the 24 Hours of Le Mans, where the team finished sixth in class. In his first season with the team, the team finished second in the LMGTE Am class, winning twice at the Nürburgring and in Mexico City. Cairoli also competed with Dempsey-Proton in the European Le Mans Series for 2017, scoring a class victory at Portimão as the team finished third in points. Ahead of the 2019–20 FIA World Endurance Championship, Cairoli returned to Team Project 1.

In February 2020, Cairoli signed with Dinamic Motorsport to compete in the GT World Challenge Europe Endurance Cup. The following season, Cairoli featured as part of the Manthey Racing team that claimed overall victory at the 24 Hours of Nürburgring, driving alongside Kévin Estre and Michael Christensen. At the end of 2023, Cairoli departed the Porsche factory roster.

Ahead of 2024, Cairoli joined the Lamborghini factory roster, taking part in the team's IMSA SportsCar Championship effort for the season in both the GTD Lamborghini Huracán and the GTP Lamborghini SC63 teams; he also drove at the 24 Hours of Le Mans. He left Lamborghini in January 2025 and joined the Iron Lynx team for the 2025 World Endurance Championship.

== Racing record ==
=== Career summary ===
Season	Series	Team	Races	Wins	Poles	F/Laps	Podiums	Points	Position
2012	Challenge Tricolore Formula Renault 2.0 Italia	GSK Grand Prix	4	0	0	0	1	23	13th
2013	ATS Formel 3 Cup	ADM Motorsport	26	0	0	0	2	112	7th
2014	Porsche Carrera Cup Italia	Antonelli Motorsport	14	6	4	6	13	200	**1st**
2014	Italian F4 Championship	Antonelli Motorsport	5	0	0	0	2	33	13th
2014	Porsche Supercup	Antonelli Motorsport	2	0	0	1	0	0	NC
2014	V de V Challenge Monoplace	GSK Grand Prix	6	3	1	5	3	243.5	13th
2014	Formula Renault 2.0 Alps	GSK Grand Prix	1	0	0	0	0	0	NC
2015	Porsche Supercup	Market Leader by Project 1	10	0	1	0	2	83	7th
2015	Porsche Carrera Cup Germany	Deutsche Post by Project 1	17	0	0	1	0	104	11th
2015	Nürburgring Endurance Series - SP7	Manthey Racing	2	1	0	1	2	?	?
2015	24 Hours of Nürburgring - SP7	Manthey Racing	1	0	0	0	0	N/A	DNF
2015	24H Series - A6 Am	Fach Auto Tech	1	0	0	0	0	?	?
2016	Porsche Supercup	Fach Auto Tech	10	4	4	2	6	151	**2nd**
2016	European Le Mans Series - LMGTE	Proton Competition	2	0	1	1	1	29	11th
2016	ADAC GT Masters	KÜS Team75 Bernhard	2	0	0	0	0	12	39th
2016	Porsche Carrera Cup Italia	Ebimotors	3	3	3	3	3	43	15th
2016	Porsche Carrera Cup France	Ebimotors	4	2	3	2	3	0	NC
2016	Porsche Carrera Cup Germany	Ebimotors	4	0	2	0	1	0	NC
2017	FIA World Endurance Championship - LMGTE Am	Dempsey-Proton Racing	9	2	1	1	6	168	**2nd**
2017	European Le Mans Series - LMGTE	Dempsey-Proton Racing	6	1	1	2	2	80	**3rd**
2017	IMSA SportsCar Championship - GTD	Manthey Racing	1	0	0	0	0	5	85th
2017	24H Series - A6	Manthey Racing	1	0	0	0	1	28	?
2017	Nürburgring Endurance Series - SP9	Manthey Racing	1	0	0	0	0	0	NC
2017	24 Hours of Nürburgring - SP9	Manthey Racing	1	0	0	0	0	N/A	DNF
2018	European Le Mans Series - LMGTE	Proton Competition	5	1	2	2	5	85.5	**3rd**
2018	FIA World Endurance Championship - LMGTE Am	Proton Competition	8	0	3	2	1	26	16th
2018	IMSA SportsCar Championship - GTD	Manthey Racing	1	0	0	0	0	11	71st
2018	Nürburgring Endurance Series - SP9	KÜS Team75 Bernhard	1	0	0	0	0	2.75	?
2018	24 Hours of Nürburgring - SP9	KÜS Team75 Bernhard	1	0	0	0	0	N/A	19th
2019	European Le Mans Series - LMGTE	Dempsey-Proton Racing	6	1	4	2	3	76	**2nd**
2019	FIA World Endurance Championship - LMGTE Am	Team Project 1	7	0	2	0	1	80	10th
2019	ADAC GT Masters	KÜS Team75 Bernhard	14	0	0	0	0	20	26th
2019	IMSA SportsCar Championship - GTD	Manthey Racing	1	0	0	0	0	17	62nd
2019	24 Hours of Nürburgring - SP9	Manthey Racing	1	0	0	0	0	N/A	4th
2020	GT World Challenge Europe Endurance Cup	Dinamic Motorsport	4	1	0	0	2	53	**3rd**
2020	Intercontinental GT Challenge	Absolute Racing	1	0	0	0	0	8	17th
2020	Nürburgring Endurance Series	Falken Motorsports	2	0	0	0	0	2.89	87th
2021	GT World Challenge Europe Endurance Cup	Dinamic Motorsport	5	1	0	0	2	53	6th
2021	Intercontinental GT Challenge	Dinamic Motorsport	1	0	0	0	0	0	NC
2021	24H GT Series - GT3	Dinamic Motorsport	1	0	0	0	0	0	NC†
2021	FIA World Endurance Championship - LMGTE Am	Team Project 1	5	0	1	0	3	78	4th
2021	24 Hours of Nürburgring - SP9	Manthey Racing	1	1	0	0	1	N/A	**1st**
2022	FIA World Endurance Championship - LMGTE Am	Team Project 1	6	1	0	2	2	71	7th
2022	24 Hours of Le Mans - LMGTE Am	Team Project 1	1	0	0	0	0	N/A	DNF
2022	IMSA SportsCar Championship - GTD Pro	WeatherTech Racing	1	0	0	0	0	253	32nd
2022	GT World Challenge Europe Endurance Cup	Dinamic Motorsport	4	1	0	0	2	48	6th
2022	24H GT Series - GT3	Dinamic Motorsport	1	0	0	0	0	0	NC†
2022	24 Hours of Nürburgring - SP9	Dinamic Motorsport	1	0	0	0	0	N/A	DNF
2023	Asian Le Mans Series - GT	Herberth Motorsport	4	0	0	0	0	24	6th
2023	FIA World Endurance Championship - LMGTE Am	Project 1 – AO	6	0	0	0	0	36	13th
2023	24 Hours of Le Mans - LMGTE Am	Project 1 – AO	1	0	0	0	0	N/A	7th
2023	European Le Mans Series - LMGTE	Iron Lynx	6	1	0	0	3	80	**3rd**
2023	International GT Open	Huber Motorsport	1	0	0	1	0	16	17th
2023	GT World Challenge Europe Endurance Cup	Huber Motorsport	1	0	1	1	0	0	NC
2023	GT World Challenge Asia - GT3	Absolute Racing	4	0	1	0	1	28	22nd
2023	FIA GT World Cup	Absolute Racing	1	0	0	0	0	N/A	11th
2023	GT World Challenge America - Pro	MDK Motorsports	1	0	0	0	0	0	NC†
2023	Intercontinental GT Challenge	MDK Motorsports	1	0	0	0	0	16	20th
2023	Intercontinental GT Challenge	Herberth Motorsport	1	0	0	0	0	16	20th
2023	24 Hours of Nürburgring - SP9	Rutronik Racing	1	0	0	0	0	N/A	5th
2023-24	Asian Le Mans Series - GT	Herberth Motorsport	2	0	0	0	0	6	24th
2024	IMSA SportsCar Championship - GTP	Lamborghini–Iron Lynx	4	0	0	1	0	986	16th
2024	European Le Mans Series - LMP2	Iron Lynx - Proton	6	1	1	1	1	36	8th
2024	IMSA SportsCar Championship - GTD Pro	Iron Lynx	1	0	0	0	0	213	43rd
2024	GT World Challenge Europe Endurance Cup	Iron Lynx	4	0	1	0	1	27	10th
2024	FIA World Endurance Championship - LMGT3	Iron Lynx	1	0	0	0	0	18	21st
2024	FIA GT World Cup	SJM VSR Theodore Racing	1	0	0	0	0	N/A	DNF
2025	FIA World Endurance Championship - LMGT3	Iron Lynx	3	0	0	0	0	0	26th
2025	European Le Mans Series - LMP2	Iron Lynx - Proton	6	0	1	1	0	35	9th
2025	GT World Challenge Europe Endurance Cup	Mercedes-AMG Team Mann-Fiter	5	1	1	0	2	72	**2nd**
2025	Nürburgring Langstrecken-Serie - SP9	Dinamic GT							
2025	24 Hours of Nürbugring - SP9	Dinamic GT	1	0	0	0	1	N/A	**3rd**
2025	International GT Open	Team Motopark	4	1	0	0	1	23	13th
2025	Italian GT Championship Sprint Cup - GT3	Antonelli Motorsport	2	0	1	1	0	0	NC†
2025-26	24H Series Middle East - GT3	Winward Racing							
2026	IMSA SportsCar Championship - GTD	DragonSpeed	1	0	0	0	0	174	76th
2026	Deutsche Tourenwagen Masters	Emil Frey Racing	16	3	2	1	3	160	5th
2026	GT World Challenge Europe Sprint Cup	Emil Frey Racing	10	0	1	1	1	17.5	17th

^{*} Season still in progress. ^{†} Guest driver, ineligible for points.

=== Complete German Formula Three Championship results ===
(key) (Races in bold indicate pole position) (Races in italics indicate fastest lap)

Year	Entrant	1	2	3	4	5	6	7	8	9	10	11	12	13	14	15	16	17	18	19	20	21	22	23	24	25	26	27	DC	Points
2013	ADM Motorsport	OSC1; 1; 7	OSC1; 2; 8	OSC1; 2 Ret	SPA; 1 Ret	SPA; 2; 11	SPA; 3; 8	NÜR1; 1; 8	NÜR1; 2 C	NÜR1; 3; 9	SAC; 1; 5	SAC; 2; 6	SAC; 3; 4	LAU1; 1; 9	LAU1; 2; 7	LAU1; 3; 5	NÜR2; 1; 7	NÜR2; 2; 5	NÜR2; 3; 7	LAU2; 1; 8	LAU2; 2; 3	LAU2; 3; 7	OSC2; 1; 8	OSC2; 2; 3	OSC2; 3; 7	HOC; 1; 16†	HOC; 2; 7	HOC; 3; 7	7th	112

=== Complete Italian F4 Championship results ===
(key) (Races in bold indicate pole position; races in italics indicate fastest lap)

Year	Team	1	2	3	4	5	6	7	8	9	10	11	12	13	14	15	16	17	18	19	20	21	DC	Points
2014	Antonelli Motorsport	ADR; 1; 4	ADR; 2 Ret	ADR; 3 DNS	IMO1; 1; 21	IMO1; 2; 16	IMO1; 3; 3	MUG; 1	MUG; 2	MUG; 3	MAG; 1	MAG; 2	MAG; 3	VLL; 1	VLL; 2	VLL; 3	MNZ; 1	MNZ; 2	MNZ; 3	IMO2; 1	IMO2; 2	IMO2; 3	13th	33

=== Complete Porsche Carrera Cup Italia results ===
(key) (Races in bold indicate pole position) (Races in italics indicate fastest lap)

Year	Team	1	2	3	4	5	6	7	8	9	10	11	12	13	14	Pos.	Points
2014	Antonelli Motorsport	MIS; 1; 3	MIS; 2; 1	MNZ1; 1; 3	MNZ1; 2; 3	MUG; 1; 1	MUG; 2; 3	**LEC**; **1**; 1	LEC; 2; 1	**VLL**; **1**; 1	VLL; 2; 2	**IMO**; **1**; 2	IMO; 2; 8	**MNZ2**; **1**; 1	MNZ2; 2; 2	1st	200

=== Complete Porsche Supercup results ===
(key) (Races in bold indicate pole position) (Races in italics indicate fastest lap)

Year	Team	1	2	3	4	5	6	7	8	9	10	11	Pos.	Points
2014	Antonelli Motorsport	CAT	MON	RBR	SIL	GER	HUN	SPA; 15	MNZ; 10	USA	USA		NC†	0
2015	Market Leader by Project 1	CAT; 14	MON; 8	RBR; 7	SIL; 6	HUN; 11	SPA; 8	SPA; Ret	MNZ; 2	**MNZ**; 2	USA; C	USA; 11	7th	83
2016	Fach Auto Tech	**CAT**; 1	**MON**; 1	**RBR**; 4	SIL; 3	HUN; 7	HOC; 1	SPA; 4	**MNZ**; 1	USA; Ret	USA; 2		2nd	151

=== Complete 24 Hours of Nürburgring results ===
Year	Team	Co-Drivers	Car	Class	Laps	Ovr. Pos.	Class Pos.
2015	(Germany) Manthey Racing	(Germany) Christoph Breuer (Germany) Sven Müller (Germany) Mike Stursberg	Porsche 911 GT3 Cup MR	SP7	44	DNF	DNF
2017	(Germany) Manthey Racing	(France) Mathieu Jaminet (Germany) Otto Klohs (Germany) Robert Renauer	Porsche 911 GT3 R	SP9	26	DNF	DNF
2018	(Germany) KÜS Team75 Bernhard	(Germany) Jörg Bergmeister (Denmark) Michael Christensen (Germany) André Lotterer	Porsche 911 GT3 R	SP9	128	21st	19th
2019	(Germany) Manthey Racing	(Germany) Lars Kern (Germany) Otto Klohs (Norway) Dennis Olsen	Porsche 911 GT3 R	SP9	155	4th	4th
2021	(Germany) Manthey Racing	(Denmark) Michael Christensen (France) Kévin Estre	Porsche 911 GT3 R	SP9	59	**1st**	**1st**
2022	(Italy) Dinamic Motorsport	(Germany) Christian Engelhart (France) Côme Ledogar (Austria) Thomas Preining	Porsche 911 GT3 R	SP9; Pro	11	DNF	DNF
2023	(Germany) Rutronik Racing	(France) Julien Andlauer (Norway) Dennis Olsen	Porsche 911 GT3 R (992)	SP9; Pro	162	5th	5th
2025	(Italy) Dinamic GT	(Denmark) Bastian Buus (Netherlands) Loek Hartog (Germany) Joel Sturm	Porsche 911 GT3 R (992)	SP9; Pro	140	**3rd**	**3rd**

=== Complete European Le Mans Series results ===
(key) (Races in bold indicate pole position; results in italics indicate fastest lap)

Year	Entrant	Class	Chassis	Engine	1	2	3	4	5	6	Rank	Points
2016	Proton Competition	LMGTE	Porsche 911 RSR	Porsche 4.0 L Flat-6	SIL	IMO	**RBR**; 5	LEC	SPA; 2	EST	11th	29
2017	Proton Competition	LMGTE	Porsche 911 RSR	Porsche 4.0 L Flat-6	SIL; 2	MNZ; 5	RBR; 5	LEC; 6	**SPA**; 6	ALG; 1	3rd	80
2018	Proton Competition	LMGTE	Porsche 911 RSR	Porsche 4.0 L Flat-6	**LEC**; 2	MNZ	RBR; 1	SIL; 2	**SPA**; 3	ALG; 3	3rd	85.5
2019	Dempsey-Proton Racing	LMGTE	Porsche 911 RSR	Porsche 4.0L Flat-6	LEC; 3	**MNZ**; 1	CAT; 6	SIL; 7	**SPA**; 2	**ALG**; Ret	2nd	76
2023	Iron Lynx	LMGTE	Porsche 911 RSR-19	Porsche 4.2 L Flat-6	CAT; 4	LEC; 2	ARA; 7	SPA; 1	PRT; 3	ALG; 8	3rd	80
2024	Iron Lynx - Proton	LMP2	Oreca 07	Gibson GK428 4.2 L V8	CAT; Ret	LEC; 9	IMO; Ret	SPA; 7	**MUG**; 1	ALG; 9	8th	36
2025	Iron Lynx - Proton	LMP2	Oreca 07	Gibson GK428 4.2 L V8	CAT; 11	LEC; Ret	IMO; 4	SPA; 8	SIL; 7	**ALG**; 4	9th	35

^{*} Season still in progress.

=== Complete FIA World Endurance Championship results ===
(key) (Races in bold indicate pole position; races in italics indicate fastest lap)

Year	Entrant	Class	Chassis	Engine	1	2	3	4	5	6	7	8	9	Rank	Points
2017	Dempsey-Proton Racing	LMGTE Am	Porsche 911 RSR	Porsche 4.0L Flat-6	SIL; 3	SPA; 2	LMS; 3	NÜR; 1	**MEX**; 1	COA; 4	FUJ; 3	SHA; 3	BHR; 4	2nd	168
2018–19	Dempsey-Proton Racing	LMGTE Am	Porsche 911 RSR	Porsche 4.0L Flat-6	SPA; 6	**LMS**; Ret	SIL; 8	FUJ; DSQ	SHA; 3	**SEB**; 7	SPA; 9	**LMS**; Ret		16th	26
2019–20	Team Project 1	LMGTE Am	Porsche 911 RSR	Porsche 4.0L Flat-6	SIL; 6	FUJ; 7	**SHA**; 5	BHR; 9	**COA**; 3	SPA; 4	LMS; 4	BHR		10th	80
2021	Team Project 1	LMGTE Am	Porsche 911 RSR-19	Porsche 4.2L Flat-6	SPA; DNS	**POR**; 2	MON; 4	LMS; Ret	FUJ; 3	BHR; 3				4th	78
2022	Team Project 1	LMGTE Am	Porsche 911 RSR-19	Porsche 4.2L Flat-6	SEB; Ret	SPA; 5	LMS; Ret	MON; 3	FUJ; 6	BHR; 1				7th	71
2023	Project 1 – AO	LMGTE Am	Porsche 911 RSR-19	Porsche 4.2L Flat-6	SEB; 12	PRT; 6	SPA; WD	LMS; 5	MNZ; 8	FUJ; 5	BHR; 10			13th	36
2024	Iron Lynx	LMGT3	Lamborghini Huracán GT3 Evo 2	Lamborghini DGF 5.2 L V10	QAT	IMO	SPA	LMS	SÃO	COA	FUJ	BHR; 4		21st	18
2025	Iron Lynx	LMGT3	Mercedes-AMG GT3 Evo	Mercedes-AMG M159 6.2 L V8	QAT; NC	IMO; 15	SPA; 12	LMS	SÃO	COA	FUJ	BHR		26th	0

=== Complete IMSA SportsCar Championship results ===
(key) (Races in bold indicate pole position)

Year	Team	Class	Make	Engine	1	2	3	4	5	6	7	8	9	10	11	12	Rank	Points	Ref
2017	Manthey Racing	GTD	Porsche 911 GT3 R	Porsche 4.0L Flat-6	DAY; 26	SEB	LBH	AUS	BEL	WGL	MOS	LIM	ELK	VIR	LGA	PET	84th	5	
2018	Manthey Racing	GTD	Porsche 911 GT3 R	Porsche 4.0L Flat-6	DAY; 20	SEB	MOH	BEL	WGL	MOS	LIM	ELK	VIR	LGA	PET		64th	11	
2019	Black Swan Racing	GTD	Porsche 911 GT3 R	Porsche 4.0L Flat-6	DAY; 14	SEB	MDO	DET	WGL	MOS	LIM	ELK	VIR	LGA	PET		62nd	17	
2022	WeatherTech Racing	GTD Pro	Porsche 911 GT3 R	Porsche 4.0 L Flat-6	DAY; 8	SEB	LBH	LGA	WGL	MOS	LIM	ELK	VIR	PET			32nd	253	
2024	Iron Lynx	GTD Pro	Lamborghini Huracán GT3 Evo 2	Lamborghini 5.2 L V10	DAY; 12						MOS		VIR				43rd	213	
2024	Lamborghini – Iron Lynx	GTP	Lamborghini SC63	Lamborghini 3.8 L twin-turbo V8		SEB; 7	LBH	LGA	DET	WGL; 11		ELK		IMS; 8	PET; 8		16th	986	
2026	DragonSpeed	GTD	Chevrolet Corvette Z06 GT3.R	Chevrolet LT6.R 5.5 L V8	DAY; 16	SEB	LBH	LGA	WGL	MOS	ELK	VIR	IMS	PET			76th	174	

=== Complete 24 Hours of Le Mans results ===
Year	Team	Co-Drivers	Car	Class	Laps	Pos.	Class Pos.
2017	(Germany) Dempsey-Proton Racing	(Germany) Marvin Dienst (Germany) Christian Ried	Porsche 911 RSR	LMGTE Am	329	34th	6th
2018	(Germany) Dempsey-Proton Racing	(Italy) Giorgio Roda (United Arab Emirates) Khaled Al Qubaisi	Porsche 911 RSR	LMGTE Am	225	DNF	DNF
2019	(Germany) Dempsey-Proton Racing	(Japan) Satoshi Hoshino (Italy) Giorgio Roda	Porsche 911 RSR	LMGTE Am	79	DNF	DNF
2020	(Germany) Team Project 1	(Norway) Egidio Perfetti (Netherlands) Larry ten Voorde	Porsche 911 RSR	LMGTE Am	339	27th	4th
2021	(Germany) Team Project 1	(Norway) Egidio Perfetti (Italy) Riccardo Pera	Porsche 911 RSR-19	LMGTE Am	84	DNF	DNF
2022	(Germany) Team Project 1	(Switzerland) Nicolas Leutwiler (Denmark) Mikkel O. Pedersen	Porsche 911 RSR-19	LMGTE Am	77	DNF	DNF
2023	(Germany) Project 1 – AO	(United States) P. J. Hyett (United States) Gunnar Jeannette	Porsche 911 RSR-19	LMGTE Am	309	35th	7th
2024	(Italy) Lamborghini Iron Lynx	(Italy) Andrea Caldarelli (France) Romain Grosjean	Lamborghini SC63	Hypercar	309	13th	13th

=== Complete GT World Challenge Europe results ===
==== GT World Challenge Europe Endurance Cup ====
(key) (Races in bold indicate pole position) (Races in italics indicate fastest lap)

Year	Team	Car	Class	1	2	3	4	5	6	7	Pos.	Points
2020	Dinamic Motorsport	Porsche 911 GT3 R	Pro	IMO; 10	NÜR; 1	SPA; 6H; 13	SPA; 12H; 7	SPA; 24H; 3	LEC; 10		3rd	53
2021	Dinamic Motorsport	Porsche 911 GT3 R	Pro	MNZ; 1	LEC; 7	SPA; 6H; 18	SPA; 12H; 6	SPA; 24H; Ret	NÜR; 40	CAT; 2	6th	53
2022	Dinamic Motorsport	Porsche 911 GT3 R	Pro	IMO; 6	LEC; Ret	SPA; 6H	SPA; 12H	SPA; 24H	HOC; 3	CAT; 1	6th	48
2023	Huber Motorsport	Porsche 911 GT3 R (992)	Bronze	MNZ	LEC	SPA; 6H; 27	SPA; 12H; 27	**SPA**; **24H**; 13	NÜR	CAT	9th	36
2024	Iron Lynx	Lamborghini Huracán GT3 Evo 2	Pro	**LEC**; 2	SPA; 6H; 57†	SPA; 12H; Ret	SPA; 24H; Ret	NÜR; 9	MNZ	JED; 7	10th	27
2025	Mercedes-AMG Team Mann-Filter	Mercedes-AMG GT3 Evo	Pro	**LEC**; 4	MNZ; 1	SPA; 6H; 2	SPA; 12H; 7	SPA; 24H; 10	NÜR; 2	CAT; 13	2nd	72

==== GT World Challenge Europe Sprint Cup ====
(key) (Races in bold indicate pole position) (Races in italics indicate fastest lap)

Year	Team	Car	Class	1	2	3	4	5	6	7	8	9	10	Pos.	Points
2026	Emil Frey Racing	Ferrari 296 GT3 Evo	Pro	BRH; 1; 5	BRH; 2; 9	MIS; 1; 22	MIS; 2 Ret	MAG; 1; 28	MAG; 2; 17	ZAN; 1; 16	**ZAN**; **2**; 3	CAT; 1 Ret	CAT; 2; 13	17th	17.5

=== Complete International GT Open results ===
(key) (Races in bold indicate pole position) (Races in italics indicate fastest lap)

Year	Team	Car	Class	1	2	3	4	5	6	7	8	9	10	11	12	13	14	Pos.	Points
2023	Huber Motorsport	Porsche 911 GT3 R (992)	Pro-Am	ALG; 1	ALG; 2	SPA; 4	HUN; 1	HUN; 2	LEC; 1	LEC; 2	RBR; 1	RBR; 2	MNZ; 1	MNZ; 2	CAT; 1	CAT; 2		10th	20
2025	Team Motopark	Mercedes-AMG GT3 Evo	Pro	ALG; 1; 4	ALG; 2; 1	SPA	HOC; 1	HOC; 2	HUN; 1	HUN; 2	LEC; 1	LEC; 2	RBR; 1	RBR; 2				13th	23
2025	Team Motopark	Mercedes-AMG GT3 Evo	Pro-Am												CAT; 1; 18	CAT; 2; 17	MNZ	28th	4

=== Complete Deutsche Tourenwagen Masters results ===
(key) (Races in bold indicate pole position) (Races in italics indicate fastest lap)

Year	Entrant	Chassis	1	2	3	4	5	6	7	8	9	10	11	12	13	14	15	16	Rank	Points
2026	Emil Frey Racing	Ferrari 296 GT3 Evo	RBR; 1; 8	RBR; 2; 14	**ZAN**; **1**; 1^{1}	ZAN; 2; 11	LAU; 1; 8	LAU; 2; 1^{2}	NOR; 1; 11	NOR; 2 Ret	OSC; 1; 11	OSC; 2; 9	**NÜR**; **1**; 1^{1}	NÜR; 2; 13^{3}	SAC; 1; 6	SAC; 2; 4	HOC; 1; 18	HOC; 2; 6	5th	160

Sporting positions
Preceded by Enrico Fulgenzi	Porsche Carrera Cup Italy; Champion; 2014	Succeeded by Riccardo Agostini
