= 2013 Porsche Carrera Cup Italia =

Motor racing competition

2013 Porsche Carrera Cup Italy

Seasons
- ← 2012 2014 →

The 2013 Porsche Carrera Cup Italia season was the seventh Porsche Carrera Cup Italy season. It began on 4 May at Misano and finished on 20 October in Monza, after seven events with two races at each event. Enrico Fulgenzi won the drivers' championship driving for Heaven Motorsport, which won the teams' championship.

== Teams and drivers ==
| Team | No. | Drivers | Class | Rounds |
|---|---|---|---|---|
| (Italy) Ebimotors - Centro Porsche Milano | 4 | (Italy) Alberto Cerqui | | All |
| (Italy) Ebimotors - Centro Porsche Milano | 84 | (Italy) Alberto de Amicis | M | All |
| (Italy) Antonelli Motorsport | 7 | (Italy) Massimo Monti | | 3, 5-6 |
| (Italy) Antonelli Motorsport | 11 | (Italy) Gianluca Giraudi | | All |
| (Italy) Antonelli Motorsport | 63 | (Italy) Pietro Negra | M | 1-4, 6-7 |
| (Italy) Antonelli Motorsport | 77 | (Italy) Nicolò Granzotto | M | All |
| (Italy) Erre Esse Motorsport | 9 | (Italy) Edoardo Liberati | | All |
| (Italy) Erre Esse Motorsport | 52 | (Italy) Angelo Proietti | M | All |
| (San Marino) Tsunami Racing Team | 13 | (Ukraine) Oleksandr Gaidai | | All |
| (San Marino) Tsunami Racing Team | 19 | (France) Paul-Loup Chatin | | 2-3, 5 |
| (Italy) GDL Racing | 16 | (Italy) Alessandro Cicognani | | 1-3 |
| (Italy) GDL Racing | 58 | (Italy) Vittorio Bagnasco | M | 1-4, 6-7 |
| (Italy) GDL Racing | 59 | (Italy) Marco Cassarà | M | 4-7 |
| (Italy) Heaven Motorsport | 17 | (Italy) Enrico Fulgenzi | | All |
| (Italy) Heaven Motorsport | 69 | (Italy) Stefano Sala | M | 3 |
| (Italy) Bonaldi Motorsport | 27 | (Serbia) Miloš Pavlović | | 7 |
| (France) Graff Racing | 29 | (France) Éric Trouillet | | 5 |
| (Italy) Krypton Motorsport | 55 | (Italy) Giacomo Scanzi | M | All |
| (Italy) Krypton Motorsport | 66 | (Italy) Fabrizio Bignotti | M | All |
| (France) Nourry Compétition | 66 | (France) Philippe Arrobio | M | 5 |
| (France) Nourry Compétition | 133 | (France) Jim Pla | | 3, 5 |
| (France) Nourry Compétition | 155 | (Belgium) Andrea Barlesi | | 3, 5 |
| (France) Nourry Compétition | 166 | (France) Michel Nourry | M | 3 |
| (Italy) Mik Corse | 67 | (Italy) Alex de Giacomi | M | All |
| (Italy) Ebimotors | 78 | (Italy) Nicola Benucci | M | All |
| (Italy) Ebimotors | 90 | (Italy) Davide Roda | M | 1-4, 6-7 |
| (Italy) Kinetic Racing | 99 | (Russia) Mikhail Spiridonov | M | All |
| (France) Sébastien Loeb Racing | 101 | (France) Côme Ledogar | | 3, 5 |
| (France) Sébastien Loeb Racing | 102 | (France) Maxime Jousse | | 3, 5 |
| (France) Sébastien Loeb Racing | 103 | (France) Christian Bottemanne | M | 3, 5 |
| (France) Sébastien Loeb Racing | 104 | (France) Sacha Bottemanne | | 3, 5 |
| (France) Sébastien Loeb Racing | 911 | (France) Christophe Lapierre | M | 3, 5 |
| (France) Racing Technology | 105 | (France) Lonni Martins | | 3, 5 |
| (France) Racing Technology | 107 | (France) Vincent Beltoise | | 3, 5 |
| (France) Racing Technology | 109 | (France) Benjamin Lariche | | 3, 5 |
| (France) Racing Technology | 112 | (France) Tony Samon | M | 3, 5 |
| (France) Box Racing | 108 | (France) Olivier Lombard | | 3, 5 |
| (France) Box Racing | 173 | (France) Philippe Colancon | M | 3, 5 |
| (France) Pro GT by Alméras | 110 | (France) Romain Monti | | 3, 5 |
| (France) Pro GT by Alméras | 111 | (France) Matthieu Vaxivière | | 3 |
| (Belgium) Speed Lover | 117 | (Belgium) Jean Glorieux | M | 3, 5 |
| (France) CRT by A-Style | 138 | (France) Gaël Castelli | | 3, 5 |
| (France) RMS | 174 | (France) Bruno Strazzer | M | 3 |

| Icon | Class |
|---|---|
| M | Michelin Cup |

== Race calendar and results ==
| Round | | Circuit | Date | Pole position | Fastest lap | Winning driver | Winning team |
|---|---|---|---|---|---|---|---|
| 1 | R1 | (Italy) Misano World Circuit Marco Simoncelli, Misano Adriatico | 4 May | (Italy) Enrico Fulgenzi | (Italy) Enrico Fulgenzi | (Italy) Gianluca Giraudi | (Italy) Antonelli Motorsport |
| 1 | R2 | (Italy) Misano World Circuit Marco Simoncelli, Misano Adriatico | 5 May | | (Italy) Gianluca Giraudi | (Italy) Alberto Cerqui | (Italy) Ebimotors - Centro Porsche Milano |
| 2 | R1 | (Austria) Red Bull Ring, Spielberg | 16 June | (France) Paul-Loup Chatin | (Italy) Gianluca Giraudi | (France) Paul-Loup Chatin | (San Marino) Tsunami Racing Team |
| 2 | R2 | (Austria) Red Bull Ring, Spielberg | 16 June | | (Italy) Enrico Fulgenzi | (Italy) Enrico Fulgenzi | (Italy) Heaven Motorsport |
| 3 | R1 | (Italy) Autodromo Internazionale del Mugello, Scarperia | 7 July | (Italy) Gianluca Giraudi | (France) Matthieu Vaxivière | (Italy) Gianluca Giraudi | (Italy) Antonelli Motorsport |
| 3 | R2 | (Italy) Autodromo Internazionale del Mugello, Scarperia | 7 July | | (Italy) Massimo Monti | (Italy) Alberto Cerqui | (Italy) Ebimotors - Centro Porsche Milano |
| 4 | R1 | (Italy) Autodromo Enzo e Dino Ferrari, Imola | 21 July | (Italy) Enrico Fulgenzi | (Italy) Gianluca Giraudi | (Italy) Enrico Fulgenzi | (Italy) Heaven Motorsport |
| 4 | R2 | (Italy) Autodromo Enzo e Dino Ferrari, Imola | 21 July | | (Italy) Gianluca Giraudi | (Italy) Alberto Cerqui | (Italy) Ebimotors - Centro Porsche Milano |
| 5 | R1 | (France) Circuit de Nevers Magny-Cours, Magny-Cours | 7 September | (France) Côme Ledogar | (France) Jim Pla | (France) Maxime Jousse | (France) Sébastien Loeb Racing |
| 5 | R2 | (France) Circuit de Nevers Magny-Cours, Magny-Cours | 8 September | | (France) Maxime Jousse | (Italy) Gianluca Giraudi | (Italy) Antonelli Motorsport |
| 6 | R1 | (Italy) Misano World Circuit Marco Simoncelli, Misano Adriatico | 21 September | (Italy) Alberto Cerqui | (Italy) Alberto Cerqui | (Italy) Enrico Fulgenzi | (Italy) Heaven Motorsport |
| 6 | R2 | (Italy) Misano World Circuit Marco Simoncelli, Misano Adriatico | 22 September | | (Italy) Enrico Fulgenzi | (Italy) Massimo Monti | (Italy) Antonelli Motorsport |
| 7 | R1 | (Italy) Autodromo Nazionale Monza, Monza | 19 October | (Italy) Alberto Cerqui | (Italy) Alberto Cerqui | (Italy) Alberto Cerqui | (Italy) Ebimotors - Centro Porsche Milano |
| 7 | R2 | (Italy) Autodromo Nazionale Monza, Monza | 20 October | | (Italy) Enrico Fulgenzi | (Italy) Enrico Fulgenzi | (Italy) Heaven Motorsport |

== Championship standings ==
Points system
| | **1st** | **2nd** | **3rd** | **4th** | **5th** | **6th** | **7th** | **8th** | **9th** | **10th** | **Pole** | FL |
| Race 1 | 20 | 15 | 12 | 10 | 8 | 6 | 4 | 3 | 2 | 1 | 2 | 1 |
| Race 2 | 15 | 10 | 8 | 6 | 4 | 3 | 2 | 1 | | | | 1 |

=== Drivers' Championship ===
| Pos | Driver | MIS (Italy) | | RBR (Austria) | | MUG (Italy) | | IMO (Italy) | | MCO (France) | | MIS (Italy) | | MNZ (Italy) | | Pts |
|---|---|---|---|---|---|---|---|---|---|---|---|---|---|---|---|---|
| 1 | (Italy) Enrico Fulgenzi | **2** | 2 | Ret | 1 | 2 | 3 | **1** | Ret | 4 | 12 | 1 | 2 | 2 | 1 | 175 |
| 2 | (Italy) Alberto Cerqui | 3 | 1 | 4 | 4 | 5 | 1 | 2 | 1 | 10 | 8 | **2** | 4 | **1** | 2 | 173 |
| 3 | (Italy) Gianluca Giraudi | 1 | 3 | 2 | 5 | **1**^{1} | 6 | 4 | 8 | Ret^{2} | 1^{3} | 4 | 5 | 3 | 3 | 145 |
| 4 | (Italy) Edoardo Liberati | 6 | **4** | 3 | 3 | Ret | 29 | 3 | 2 | 7 | 11 | 3 | 3 | 4 | 6 | 105 |
| 5 | (Italy) Massimo Monti | | | | | 3 | 2 | | | 5^{4} | 4 | 5 | 1 | | | 72 |
| 6 | (Italy) Alberto de Amicis | 4 | 5 | Ret | 11 | 7 | 12 | 14† | 5 | 11 | 20 | 13 | 8 | 5 | 4 | 53 |
| 7 | (Italy) Alex de Giacomi | 7 | 6 | 14 | 13 | 18 | 16 | 5 | 4 | 12 | 17 | 7 | 14† | 6 | **7** | 42 |
| 8 | (Italy) Giacomo Scanzi | 9 | 8 | 7 | 7 | 19 | 15 | 7 | 3 | 23 | 16 | 6 | **11** | 8 | 16 | 34 |
| 9 | (France) Paul-Loup Chatin | | | **1** | 2 | (12) | (8) | | | (8) | (2) | | | | | 32 |
| 10 | (Italy) Angelo Proietti | Ret | 9 | 6 | **6** | 22 | 19 | 13 | 14† | 24 | 21 | 8 | 6 | 7 | 8 | 30 |
| 11 | (Italy) Niccolò Granzotto | 13 | Ret | 8 | Ret | 16 | 17 | 6 | **Ret** | 17 | 14 | 9 | 9 | Ret | Ret | 19 |
| 12 | (Italy) Fabrizio Bignotti | 11 | 14 | 5 | 10 | 26 | 26 | 8 | 13 | 19 | 19 | 10 | Ret | 10 | 15 | 14 |
| 13 | (Italy) Alessandro Cicognani | 8 | 7 | 9 | Ret | 15 | 18 | | | | | | | | | 11 |
| 14 | (Ukraine) Oleksandr Gaidai | 5 | Ret | 15 | Ret | 13 | 14 | 11 | 12 | 15 | Ret | Ret | 13† | 9 | 12 | 10 |
| 15 | (Italy) Nicola Benucci | Ret | 11 | 10 | 12 | Ret | 32 | 9 | 7 | 16 | 22 | Ret | 7 | 16 | 9 | 10 |
| 16 | (Italy) Davide Roda | 10 | 10 | 11 | 8 | 17 | 22 | 10 | 6 | | | Ret | Ret | 13 | 10 | 8 |
| 17 | (Serbia) Miloš Pavlović | | | | | | | | | | | | | 17 | 5 | 4 |
| | (Italy) Pietro Negra | 14 | 12 | 16 | 9 | 34† | 31 | Ret | Ret | | | Ret | 10 | 11 | 13 | 0 |
| | (Italy) Marco Cassarà | | | | | | | Ret | 9 | 20 | 23 | 12 | DSQ | 14 | 14 | 0 |
| | (Italy) Vittorio Bagnasco | 12 | 13 | 12 | Ret | 30 | 35 | 12 | 10 | | | 11 | Ret | 12 | Ret | 0 |
| | (Russia) Mikhail Spiridonov | 15 | 15 | 13 | 14 | Ret | 34 | Ret | 11 | 22 | 27 | 14 | 12 | 15 | 11 | 0 |
| | (Italy) Stefano Sala | | | | | Ret | 30 | | | | | | | | | 0 |
Guest drivers ineligible to score points
| | (France) Maxime Jousse | | | | | Ret | Ret | | | 1 | 29 | | | | | 0 |
| | (France) Romain Monti | | | | | 14 | 13 | | | 2 | 5 | | | | | 0 |
| | (France) Gaël Castelli | | | | | 9 | 11 | | | Ret | 3 | | | | | 0 |
| | (France) Vincent Beltoise | | | | | 32† | 20 | | | 3 | 9 | | | | | 0 |
| | (France) Matthieu Vaxivière | | | | | 4 | 5 | | | | | | | | | 0 |
| | (France) Lonni Martins | | | | | 6 | **4** | | | Ret | 10 | | | | | 0 |
| | (France) Jim Pla | | | | | 8 | 9 | | | 6 | **7** | | | | | 0 |
| | (France) Olivier Lombard | | | | | 31 | 23 | | | 9 | 6 | | | | | 0 |
| | (France) Sacha Bottemanne | | | | | 11 | 7 | | | Ret | 18 | | | | | 0 |
| | (France) Côme Ledogar | | | | | 10 | 10 | | | **Ret** | DNS | | | | | 0 |
| | (Belgium) Jean Glorieux | | | | | 25 | 28 | | | 13 | 15 | | | | | 0 |
| | (France) Christophe Lapierre | | | | | 33† | 25 | | | Ret | 13 | | | | | 0 |
| | (France) Tony Samon | | | | | 23 | 24 | | | 14 | 28† | | | | | 0 |
| | (France) Philippe Colancon | | | | | 27 | 36† | | | 18 | Ret | | | | | 0 |
| | (France) Benjamin Lariche | | | | | 20 | Ret | | | Ret | 25 | | | | | 0 |
| | (Belgium) Andrea Barlesi | | | | | 21 | 21 | | | WD | WD | | | | | 0 |
| | (France) Michel Nourry | | | | | 28 | 33 | | | 21 | 26 | | | | | 0 |
| | (France) Bruno Strazzer | | | | | 24 | 27 | | | | | | | | | 0 |
| | (France) Philippe Arrobio | | | | | | | | | Ret | 24 | | | | | 0 |
| | (France) Éric Trouillet | | | | | | | | | 25 | Ret | | | | | 0 |
| | (France) Christian Bottemanne | | | | | 29 | Ret | | | Ret | DNS | | | | | 0 |
| Pos | Driver | MIS (Italy) | | RBR (Austria) | | MUG (Italy) | | IMO (Italy) | | MCO (France) | | MIS (Italy) | | MNZ (Italy) | | Pts |

| Colour | Result |
|---|---|
| Gold | Winner |
| Silver | Second place |
| Bronze | Third place |
| Green | Points classification |
| Blue | Non-points classification |
| Blue | Non-classified finish (NC) |
| Purple | Retired, not classified (Ret) |
| Red | Did not qualify (DNQ) |
| Red | Did not pre-qualify (DNPQ) |
| Black | Disqualified (DSQ) |
| White | Did not start (DNS) |
| White | Withdrew (WD) |
| White | Race cancelled (C) |
| Blank | Did not practice (DNP) |
| Blank | Did not arrive (DNA) |
| Blank | Excluded (EX) |

**Bold** – Pole
Italics – Fastest Lap

† — Drivers did not finish the race, but were classified as they completed over 75% of the race distance.

- **^1** - Gianluca Giraudi was awarded the point for the fastest lap because Matthieu Vaxivière was ineligible to score points.
- **^2** - Gianluca Giraudi was awarded the two points for pole position because Côme Ledogar was ineligible to score points.
- **^3** - Gianluca Giraudi was awarded the point for the fastest lap because Maxime Jousse was ineligible to score points.
- **^4** - Massimo Monti was awarded the point for the fastest lap because Jim Pla was ineligible to score points.

=== Teams' Championship ===
| Pos | Team | MIS (Italy) | | RBR (Austria) | | MUG (Italy) | | IMO (Italy) | | MCO (France) | | MIS (Italy) | | MNZ (Italy) | | Pts |
|---|---|---|---|---|---|---|---|---|---|---|---|---|---|---|---|---|
| 1 | (Italy) Heaven Motorsport | 2 | 2 | Ret | 1 | 2 | 3 | 1 | Ret | 4 | 12 | 1 | 2 | 2 | 1 | 175 |
| 2 | (Italy) Ebimotors - Centro Porsche Milano | 3 | 1 | 4 | 4 | 5 | 1 | 2 | 1 | 10 | 8 | 2 | 4 | 1 | 2 | 167 |
| 3 | (Italy) Antonelli Motorsport | 1 | 3 | 2 | 5 | 1 | 2 | 4 | 8 | 5 | 1 | 4 | 1 | 3 | 3 | 163 |
| 4 | (Italy) Erre Esse Motorsport | 6 | 4 | 3 | 3 | 22 | 19 | 3 | 2 | 7 | 11 | 3 | 3 | 4 | 6 | 105 |
| 5 | (San Marino) Tsunami Racing Team | 5 | Ret | 1 | 2 | 13 | 14 | 11 | 12 | 15 | Ret | Ret | 13† | 9 | 12 | 53 |
| 6 | (Italy) Mik Corse | 7 | 6 | 14 | 13 | 18 | 16 | 5 | 4 | 12 | 17 | 7 | 14† | 6 | 7 | 42 |
| 7 | (Italy) Krypton Motorsport | 9 | 8 | 5 | 7 | 19 | 15 | 7 | 3 | 19 | 16 | 6 | 11 | 8 | 15 | 39 |
| 8 | (Italy) Ebimotors | 10 | 10 | 10 | 8 | 17 | 22 | 9 | 6 | 16 | 22 | Ret | 7 | 13 | 9 | 15 |
| 9 | (Italy) GDL Racing | 8 | 7 | 9 | Ret | 15 | 18 | 12 | 9 | 20 | 23 | 11 | Ret | 12 | 14 | 11 |
| 10 | (Italy) Bonaldi Motorsport | | | | | | | | | | | | | 17 | 5 | 4 |
| | (Italy) Kinetic Racing | 15 | 15 | 13 | 14 | Ret | 34 | Ret | 11 | 22 | 27 | 14 | 12 | 15 | 11 | 0 |
Guest teams ineligible to score points
| | (France) Sébastien Loeb Racing | | | | | 10 | 7 | | | 1 | 13 | | | | | 0 |
| | (France) Pro GT by Alméras | | | | | 4 | 5 | | | 2 | 5 | | | | | 0 |
| | (France) Racing Technology | | | | | 6 | 4 | | | 3 | 9 | | | | | 0 |
| | (France) CRT by A-Style | | | | | 9 | 11 | | | Ret | 3 | | | | | 0 |
| | (France) Nourry Compétition | | | | | 8 | 9 | | | 6 | 7 | | | | | 0 |
| | (France) Box Racing | | | | | 27 | 23 | | | 9 | 6 | | | | | 0 |
| | (Belgium) Speed Lover | | | | | 25 | 28 | | | 13 | 15 | | | | | 0 |
| | (France) RMS | | | | | 24 | 27 | | | | | | | | | 0 |
| Pos | Team | MIS (Italy) | | RBR (Austria) | | MUG (Italy) | | IMO (Italy) | | MCO (France) | | MIS (Italy) | | MNZ (Italy) | | Pts |

| Colour | Result |
|---|---|
| Gold | Winner |
| Silver | Second place |
| Bronze | Third place |
| Green | Points classification |
| Blue | Non-points classification |
| Blue | Non-classified finish (NC) |
| Purple | Retired, not classified (Ret) |
| Red | Did not qualify (DNQ) |
| Red | Did not pre-qualify (DNPQ) |
| Black | Disqualified (DSQ) |
| White | Did not start (DNS) |
| White | Withdrew (WD) |
| White | Race cancelled (C) |
| Blank | Did not practice (DNP) |
| Blank | Did not arrive (DNA) |
| Blank | Excluded (EX) |

**Bold** – Pole
Italics – Fastest Lap

† — Drivers did not finish the race, but were classified as they completed over 75% of the race distance.

=== Michelin Cup ===
The Michelin Cup is the trophy reserved to the gentlemen drivers.

| Pos | Driver | Team | Points |
|---|---|---|---|
| 1 | (Italy) Alberto de Amicis | Ebimotors - Milano | 81 |
| 2 | (Italy) Alex de Giacomi | Mik Corse | 63 |
| 3 | (Italy) Giacomo Scanzi | Krypton | 60 |
| 4 | (Italy) Angelo Proietti | Erre Esse | 45 |
| 5 | (Italy) Niccolò Granzotto | Antonelli | 37 |
| 6 | (Italy) Fabrizio Bignotti | Krypton | 26 |
| 7 | (Italy) Davide Roda | Ebimotors | 21 |
| 8 | (Italy) Nicola Benucci | Ebimotors | 20 |
| 9 | (Italy) Pietro Negra | Antonelli | 6 |
| 10 | (Italy) Vittorio Bagnasco | GDL | 2 |
| 11 | (Italy) Marco Cassarà | GDL | 2 |
| 12 | (Russia) Mikhail Spiridonov | Kinetic | 1 |
| | (Italy) Stefano Sala | Heaven | 0 |
Guest drivers ineligible for points
| | (Belgium) Jean Glorieux | Speed Lover | 0 |
| | (France) Christophe Lapierre | Loeb | 0 |
| | (France) Tony Samon | Racing Technology | 0 |
| | (France) Philippe Colancon | Box Racing | 0 |
| | (France) Michel Nourry | Nourry | 0 |
| | (France) Bruno Strazzer | RMS | 0 |
| | (France) Philippe Arrobio | Nourry | 0 |
| | (France) Éric Trouillet | Graff | 0 |
| | (France) Christian Bottemanne | Loeb | 0 |
