= Vito Postiglione =

Italian racing driver (born 1977)

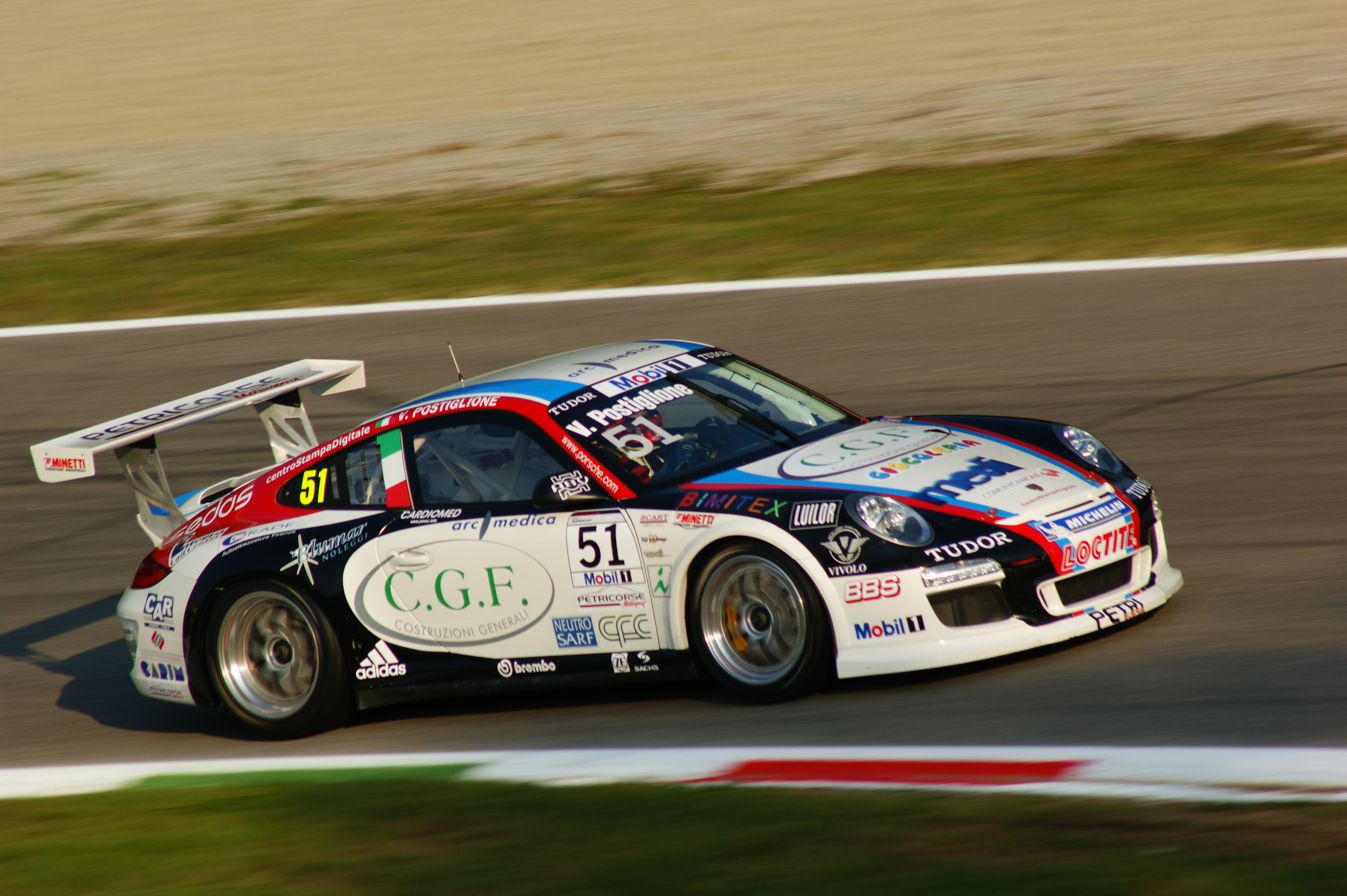
- Nationality: (Italy) Italian
- Born: 28 February 1977 (age 49) Potenza, Italy
- Categorisation: FIA Gold

Previous series
- 2009 2008 2005–2007 2004–2005, 2008 2001–2004 2001–2002 2000–2001 1998–2000: WTCC; Italian GT Championship; Italian Ferrari Challenge; Renault Clio Cup Italy; Renault Clio V6 Eurocup; Renault Clio International Cup; Renault Clio Trophy; Italian Renault Mégane Cup

Championship titles
- 1998 2000 2003 2007 2007: Italian Renault Mégane Winter Trophy; Italian Renault Mégane Cup; Vallelunga 6 Hours; Italian Ferrari Challenge; Ferrari Challenge World Final

Vito Postiglione (born 28 February 1977) is an Italian racing driver who was the winner of the Ferrari Challenge and Ferrari Challenge World Final in 2007 and of the Porsche Carrera Cup Italy in 2012. He also won the Vallelunga 6 Hours in 2003. During his career, Postiglione drove for many racing teams and cars, including Audi, BMW, Ferrari, Lamborghini, and Renault.

== Early life and career ==
Postiglione was born in Potenza, the capital of the Italian region of Basilicata in Southern Italy, on 28 February 1977. He won the Italian Renault Mégane Winter Trophy in 1998. He then finished runner-up in the main series in 1999 and won the trophy the following year. He moved up to the Renault Clio Sport Eurocup and was runner-up in his first season in 2001. He finished fifth in 2002 and third in 2003, a year that saw him winning in his class (a BMW M3) the annual Vallelunga 6 Hours.

After finishing fourth in the Clio Eurocup in 2004, Postiglione moved to the Italian Ferrari Challenge for 2005. He finished third in 2005, was runner-up in 2006, and won the series in 2007. He also completed in the Ferrari Challenge World Final in these years, finishing third in 2005, second in 2006, and won it in 2007. He moved to the Italian GT Championship in 2008, driving a Ferrari F430 GT2. Postiglione made his World Touring Car Championship debut with Proteam Motorsport in 2009, driving a BMW 320si. During his career as of 2026, he respectively started and entered 256 and 257 races, with a record of 42 wins, 116 podiums, 35 pole positions, and 39 fastest laps, for an overall record of 16.4% and 45.3% race wins and podiums.

== Personal life ==
Postiglione lives with his wife Chiara and his son Luigi. He enjoys playing indoor American football.

== Racing record ==
=== Complete World Touring Car Championship results ===
(key) (Races in bold indicate pole position) (Races in italics indicate fastest lap)

| Year | Team | Car | 1 | 2 | 3 | 4 | 5 | 6 | 7 | 8 | 9 | 10 | 11 | 12 | 13 | 14 | 15 | 16 | 17 | 18 | 19 | 20 | 21 | 22 | 23 | 24 | DC | Points |
|---|---|---|---|---|---|---|---|---|---|---|---|---|---|---|---|---|---|---|---|---|---|---|---|---|---|---|---|---|
| 2009 | Scuderia Proteam Motorsport | BMW 320si | BRA; 1 | BRA; 2 | MEX; 1 | MEX; 2 | MAR; 1; 18 | MAR; 2 Ret | FRA; 1 | FRA; 2 | ESP; 1; 19 | ESP; 2; 17 | CZE; 1; 10 | CZE; 2; 10 | POR; 1 | POR; 2 | GBR; 1; 21 | GBR; 2; 23 | GER; 1 | GER; 2 | ITA; 1 | ITA; 2 | JPN; 1 | JPN; 2 | MAC; 1 | MAC; 2 | NC | 0 |

Sporting positions
| Preceded by Alessandro Balzan | Porsche Carrera Cup Italy; Champion; 2012 | Succeeded by Enrico Fulgenzi |
