= Marco Antonelli =

Italian racing driver and motorsport executive (born 1964)

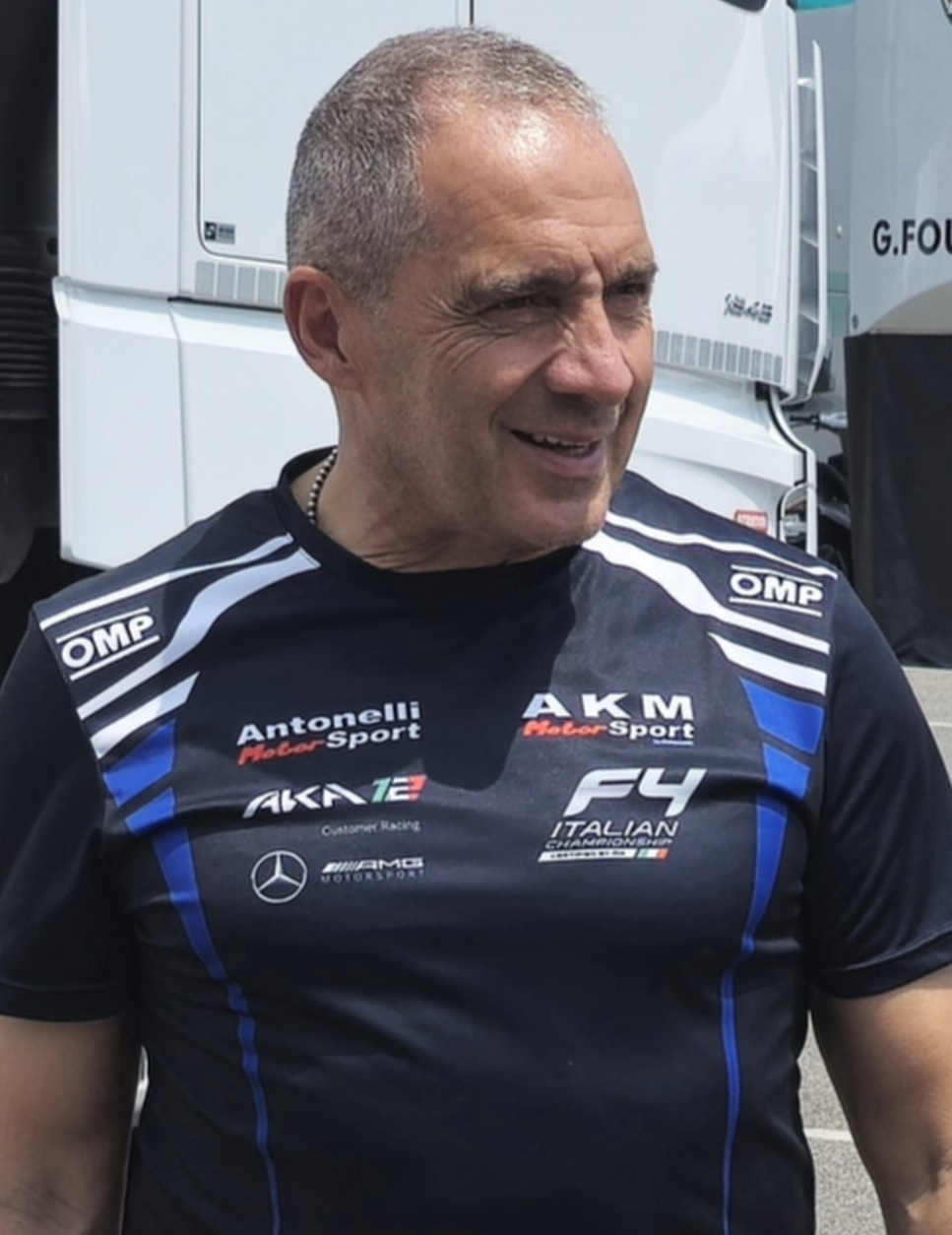
- Antonelli in 2025
- Born: 18 July 1964 (age 62); Bologna, Emilia-Romagna, Italy
- Spouse: Veronica Pomaro (m. 1997)
- Children: 2, including Kimi
- Nationality: (Italy) Italian

Italian Superturismo Championship career
- Categorisation: FIA Bronze
- Years active: 1992–1994, 1996
- Teams: AB, Peugeot, Tecnica, Motortrend
- Starts: 23
- Championships: 0
- Wins: 0
- Podiums: 0
- Poles: 0
- Fastest laps: 0
- Best finish: 13th in 1992

Previous series
- 2024; 2016–2022 (Note: The exact years Antonelli competed in the International GT Open: 2016, 2021–2022.); 2019; 2017; 2011; 2010; 2002: Italian GT; International GT Open; Blancpain GT Series; Lamborghini Super Trofeo; International GT Sprint; GT4 European Cup; ETCC

Marco Antonelli (born 18 July 1964) is an Italian racing driver and motorsport executive who owns Italian GT and F4 team AKM (Antonelli, Kimi, Maggie) Motorsport.

== Career ==
Antonelli previously contested four seasons of the Italian Superturismo Championship between 1992 and 1996, as well as two rounds of the 2002 European Touring Car Championship. He has since contested a range of GT3 events as a gentleman driver.

== AKM Motorsport ==
(Italy) AKM Motorsport
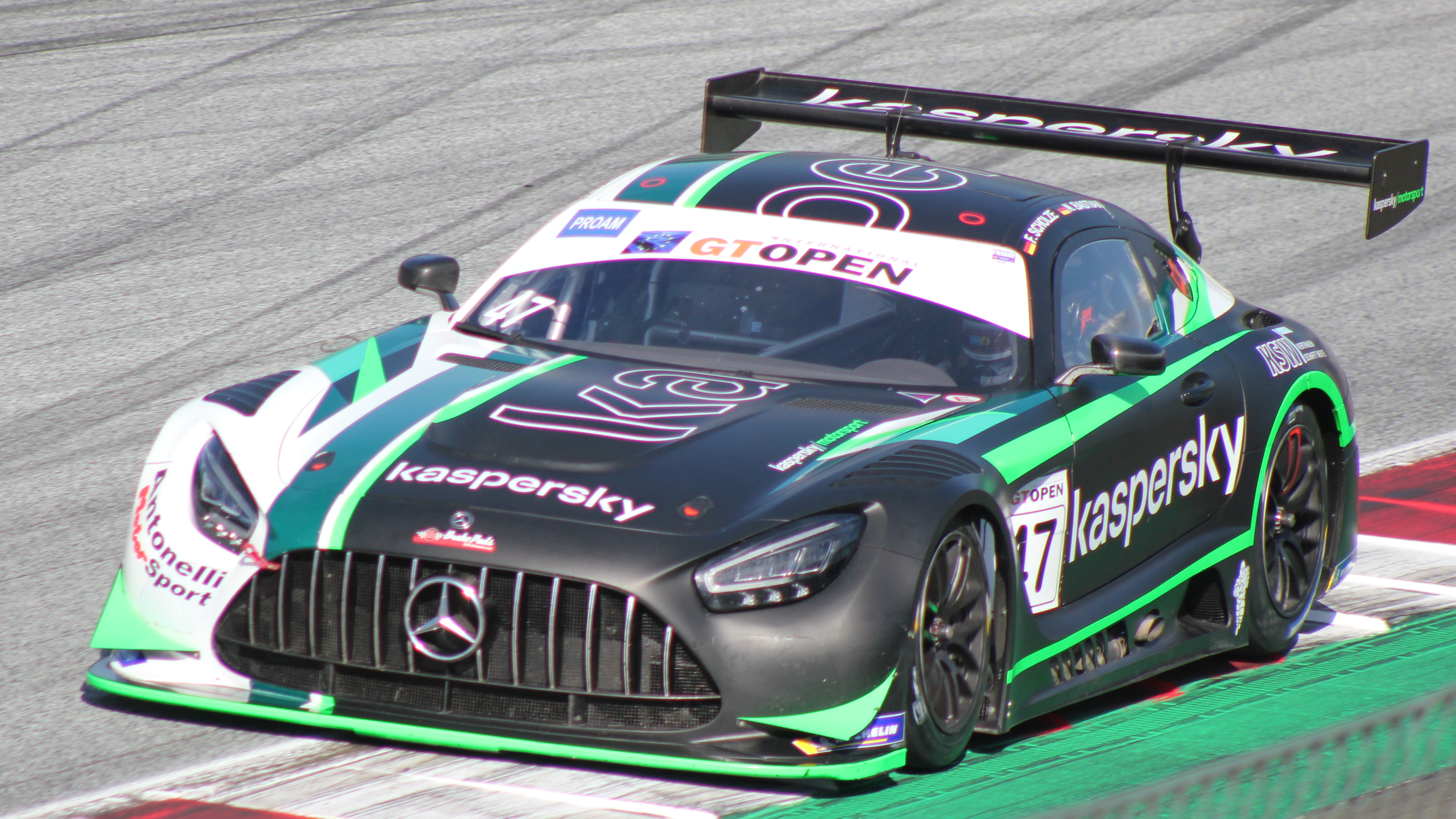
- Founded: 1993
- Former names: Antonelli Motorsport (1993–2019)
- Team principal(s): Marco Antonelli
- Current series: E4 Championship; Formula Winter Series; Italian GT Championship; Italian F4 Championship; Italian Karting Championship
- Former series: Lamborghini Super Trofeo Europe; Porsche Supercup; Porsche Carrera Cup Italia; International GT Open; GT World Challenge Europe
- Teams' Championships: Porsche Carrera Cup Italia: 2014; Lamborghini Super Trofeo Europe: 2017, 2018
- Drivers' Championships: Porsche Carrera Cup Italia: 2014, 2015; Italian GT Championship: 2014 (GTC), 2018 (Overall), 2018 (Super GT Cup), 2019 (Overall), 2019 (GT Light), 2024 (Sprint Am); Lamborghini Super Trofeo Europe: 2017, 2018; Italian F4 Championship Women Trophy: 2023

Additionally, Antonelli is the owner and team principal of AKM Motorsport, which has competed in multiple disciplines of racing including International GT Open, GT World Challenge Europe, Porsche Supercup, Lamborghini Super Trofeo, and the Italian F4 Championship.

== Personal life ==
He is the father of the Formula One driver and the 2026 World Drivers' Champion Andrea Kimi Antonelli.

On 17 May 2025, Antonelli was involved in an incident at the Imola Circuit in which his vehicle struck a police officer's leg. The officer was taken to hospital. Antonelli apologised to the police officer following the incident.

== Racing record ==
=== Career summary ===
Season	Series	Team	Races	Wins	Poles	F/Laps	Podiums	Points	Position
1992	Italian Superturismo Championship	AB Motorsport	11	0	0	0	0	28	13th
1993	Italian Superturismo Championship	AB Motorsport	8	0	0	0	0	3	26th
1994	Italian Superturismo Championship	Tecnica Racing Team	2	0	0	0	0	8	21st
1996	Italian Superturismo Championship	Motortrend	2	0	0	0	0	0	NC
2002	European Touring Car Championship	AGS Motorsport	2	0	0	0	0	0	NC
2010	GT4 European Cup	StarCars	2	0	0	0	0	4	17th
2011	International GTSprint Series	Antonelli Motorsport	4	0	0	0	0	10	14th
2012	Porsche Supercup	Antonelli Motorsport	0	0	0	0	0	0	NC
2014	Italian Formula ACI-CSAI Abarth Championship	Best Lap	2	2	1	2	2	43	4th
2016	International GT Open - Pro-Am	Antonelli Motorsport	2	1	0	0	2	0	NC†
2017	Lamborghini Super Trofeo Middle East - Am	Antonelli Motorsport	6	3	2	4	4	67	**2nd**
2019	Blancpain GT Series Endurance Cup	Antonelli Motorsport	1	0	0	0	0	0	NC
2019	Blancpain GT Series Endurance Cup - Am	Antonelli Motorsport	1	0	0	0	0	0	NC
2021	International GT Open - Am	AKM Motorsport	2	0	1	1	2	16	4th
2022	International GT Open	AKM Motorsport	2	0	0	0	0	0	31st
2022	International GT Open - Am	AKM Motorsport	2	1	0	0	2	12	11th
2024	Italian GT Sprint Championship - GT3 - Am	AKM Motorsport	2	1	0	0	2	20	NC†
2025	Italian GT Championship Sprint Cup - GT3	Antonelli Motorsport	2	0	0	0	0	0	NC†

^{†} As Antonelli was a guest driver, he was ineligible for championship points.

=== Complete European Touring Car Championship results ===
(key) (Races in bold indicate pole position) (Races in italics indicate fastest lap)

Year	Team	Car	1	2	3	4	5	6	7	8	9	10	11	12	13	14	15	16	17	18	19	20	Pos	Pts
2002	AGS Motorsport	Alfa Romeo 156 GTA	MAG; 1	MAG; 2	SIL; 1	SIL; 2	BRN; 1	BRN; 2	JAR; 1	JAR; 2	AND; 1	AND; 2	OSC; 1	OSC; 2	SPA; 1	SPA; 2	PER; 1	PER; 2	DON; 1	DON; 2	EST; 1; 7	EST; 2 Ret	NC	0
