= Davide Roda =

Italian auto racing driver (born 1972)

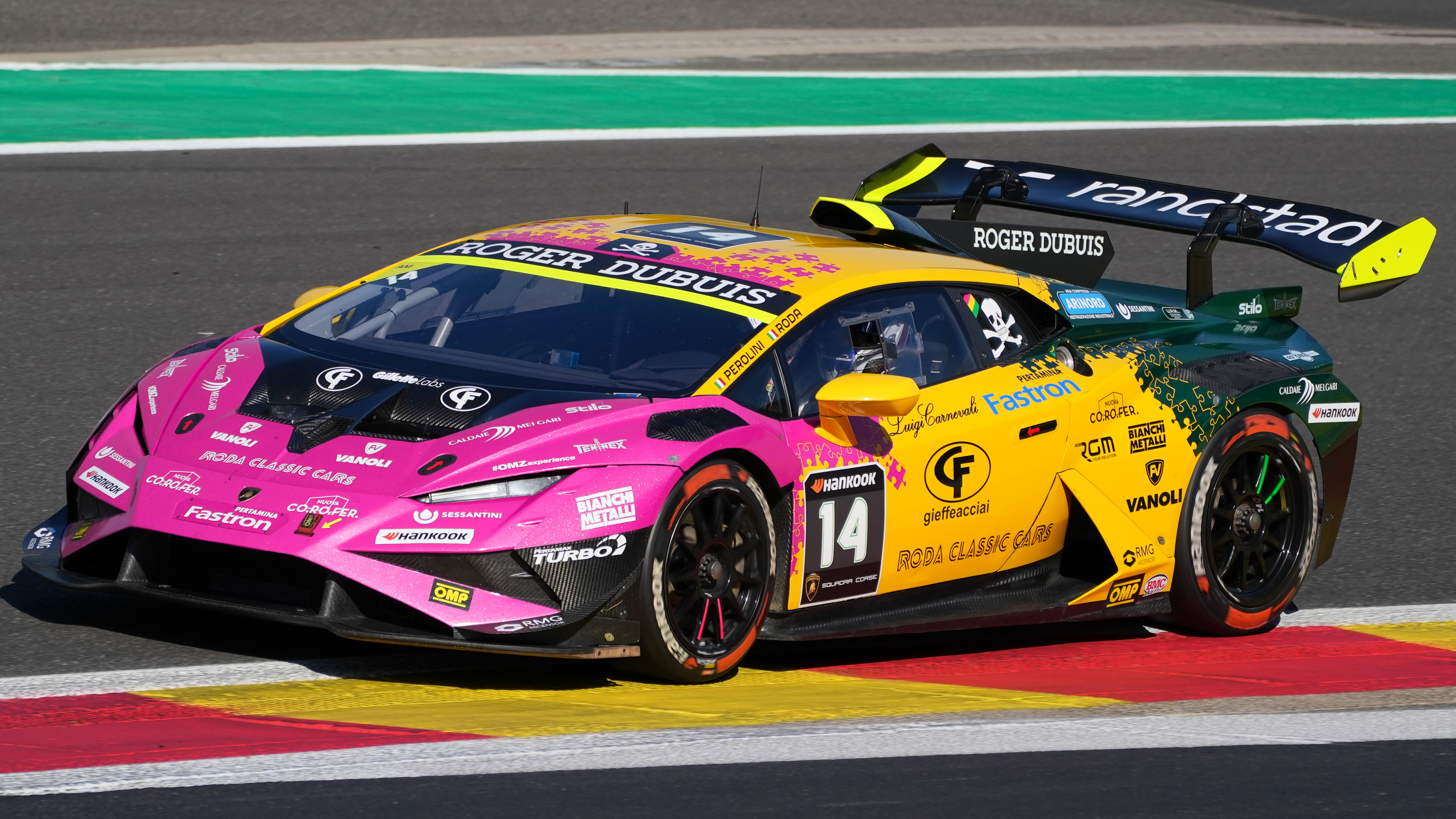
- Nationality: (Italy) Italian
- Born: 21 January 1972 (age 54) Como, Italy
- Relatives: Gianluca Roda (brother); Andrea Roda (nephew); Giorgio Roda (nephew)
- Debut season: 2003–present
- Categorisation: FIA Bronze

Davide Roda (born 21 January 1972 in Como) is an Italian auto racing driver. His first serious drive came in 2002 when he drove the Italian Alfa 147 Cup. From 2003, he spent the next three years competing in the European Alfa 147 Challenge. In 2006, he drove in the FIA World Touring Car Championship with an independent SEAT Leon. The Seat Sport Italia only managed to fund him and team mate Roberto Colciago for the first four rounds. He returned to the WTCC in 2007 for just two rounds at Brno with Proteam Motorsport in a BMW 320si. In 2008, he drove in the Spanish SEAT Leon Supercopa and the new SEAT León Eurocup.
