= Andrew Wojteczko Autosport =

Canadian sports car racing team

(Canada) AWA
- Founded: 2017
- Founder(s): Andrew Wojteczko (owner)
- Base: Caledon, Ontario, Canada
- Team principal(s): Andrew Wojteczko
- Current series: IMSA SportsCar Championship
- Former series: Michelin Pilot Challenge
- Current drivers: IMSA SportsCar Championship: 13. (United Kingdom) Matt Bell (Canada) Orey Fidani (Germany) Lars Kern (Germany) Marvin Kirchhöfer
- Noted drivers: (Canada) Martin Barkey (Canada) Orey Fidani (Canada) Anthony Mantella (United States) Brett Sandberg (Canada) Kuno Wittmer
- Drivers' Championships: Canadian Touring Car Championship: 2020: Orey Fidani
- Website: https://www.awa.team/

Andrew Wojteczko Autosport (AWA), is a Canadian sports car racing team that currently competes in the GTD class of the IMSA SportsCar Championship. The team was founded in 2017 by former race car driver and race engineer Andrew Wojteczko.

== History ==
AWA was founded at the end of 2017 by race engineer and former race car driver Andrew Wojteczko. From 2014 through 2017, Wojteczko was the team manager at Mantella Autosport. After team owner Anthony Mantella withdrew from racing, resulting in the closure of Mantella Autosport, Wojteczko formed his own racing team, Andrew Wojteczko Autosport. The team made their competitive debut in the 2018 Continental Tire SportsCar Challenge.

=== Michelin Pilot Challenge ===
==== 2018 ====
AWA made its debut in the 2018 Continental Tire SportsCar Challenge fielding a Ford Mustang GT4. The team signed Martin Barkey and Brett Sandberg to drive the car for the full season. Barkey and Sandberg would finish a best result of second in the team's home race at Canadian Tire Motorsport Park. The team would finish 9th in the championship.

==== 2019 ====
AWA returned to the now renamed Michelin Pilot Challenge in 2019, however, they would now be fielding a Porsche 718 Cayman GT4 Clubsport for drivers Orey Fidani and Scott Hargrove. Following round six at Lime Rock Park, the team switched from the Porsche to a McLaren 570S GT4. The team also replaced Hargrove with fellow Canadian Chris Green due to Hargrove being a Porsche affiliated driver. AWA had an unsuccessful season finishing 15th, last among all full-time teams in the Grand Sport class.

==== 2020 ====
The team returned to the championship for a third season in 2020, once again fielding a McLaren 570S GT4. Orey Fidani remained with the team, while veteran Kuno Wittmer was paired alongside him. The drivers would get pole position in the opening race at Daytona, but would ultimately come home in 26th. Due to the COVID-19 pandemic, the team would have to shut down operations indefinitely. There were hopes of competing later in the year, however, that never came into fruition. AWA would ultimately compete in the 2020 Canadian Touring Car Championship. The team was successful, claiming multiple wins, and the 2020 Sprint Championship.

==== 2021 ====
The team would return for the 2021 Michelin Pilot Challenge after the 2020 season was impacted due to the pandemic. AWA retained Orey Fidani and Kuno Wittmer in their lineup along with a McLaren 570S GT4. In the season opener at Daytona, the team qualified on pole and would go on to win the race. This marked the team's first win in the series. Chris Green would return to the team at Mid-Ohio, subbing in for Fidani as he was absent awaiting the arrival of his newborn son. Green and Wittmer would go on to get the team's second win in three races. AWA would finish fifth in the GS class of the championship.

=== IMSA Prototype Challenge ===
==== 2022 ====
AWA would move up the IMSA ladder in 2022 to the IMSA Prototype Challenge fielding the No. 17 Duqueine M30 - D-08 in the LMP3 class for Orey Fidani and Anthony Mantella. Their entry would also see them compete in the Bronze Cup as both Fidani and Mantella were Bronze rated drivers. Fidani was only scheduled to compete at the season opener at Daytona, while Mantella would compete in four out of five races in the championship. Mantella would finish eighth in the driver's championship and third in the Bronze Driver's cup, while the No. 17 finished ninth in the team's championship.

=== IMSA SportsCar Championship ===
==== 2022 ====
Alongside a campaign in the 2022 IMSA Prototype Challenge, AWA would graduate to the top level of the IMSA ladder in 2022, the IMSA SportsCar Championship. The team would field the No. 13 Duqueine M30 - D-08 in the LMP3 class. In the 2022 Petit Le Mans at Road Atlanta, they brought a second LMP3 in the No. 76 for drivers Kyle Marcelli, Anthony Martella, and Josh Sarchet. The No. 13 AWA entry finished sixth in the LMP3 Team's Championship with two podiums.

==== 2023 ====
AWA returned for the 2023 IMSA SportsCar Championship with two full-time LMP3 entries in the No. 13 and No. 17. Fidani would return to the No. 13 alongside Matt Bell, while Wayne Boyd and Anthony Mantella would drive the No. 17. For the Michelin Endurance Cup rounds, the team brought in Germans Lars Kern and Moritz Kranz into the No. 13, and Nicolás Varrone and Thomas Merrill into the No. 17. Boyd, Mantella, Varrone, and Merrill won the season opening 24 Hours of Daytona in the team's first attempt. The No. 17 finished 12 laps ahead of the Sean Creech Motorsports car in second. The No. 17 would manage to get a second win in the 2023 IMSA Battle on the Bricks at Indianapolis Motor Speedway with Boyd and Mantella. AWA would have a successful second season in the category, finishing third and fourth with the No. 13 and No. 17 cars respectively in the LMP3 team's championship.

==== 2024 ====
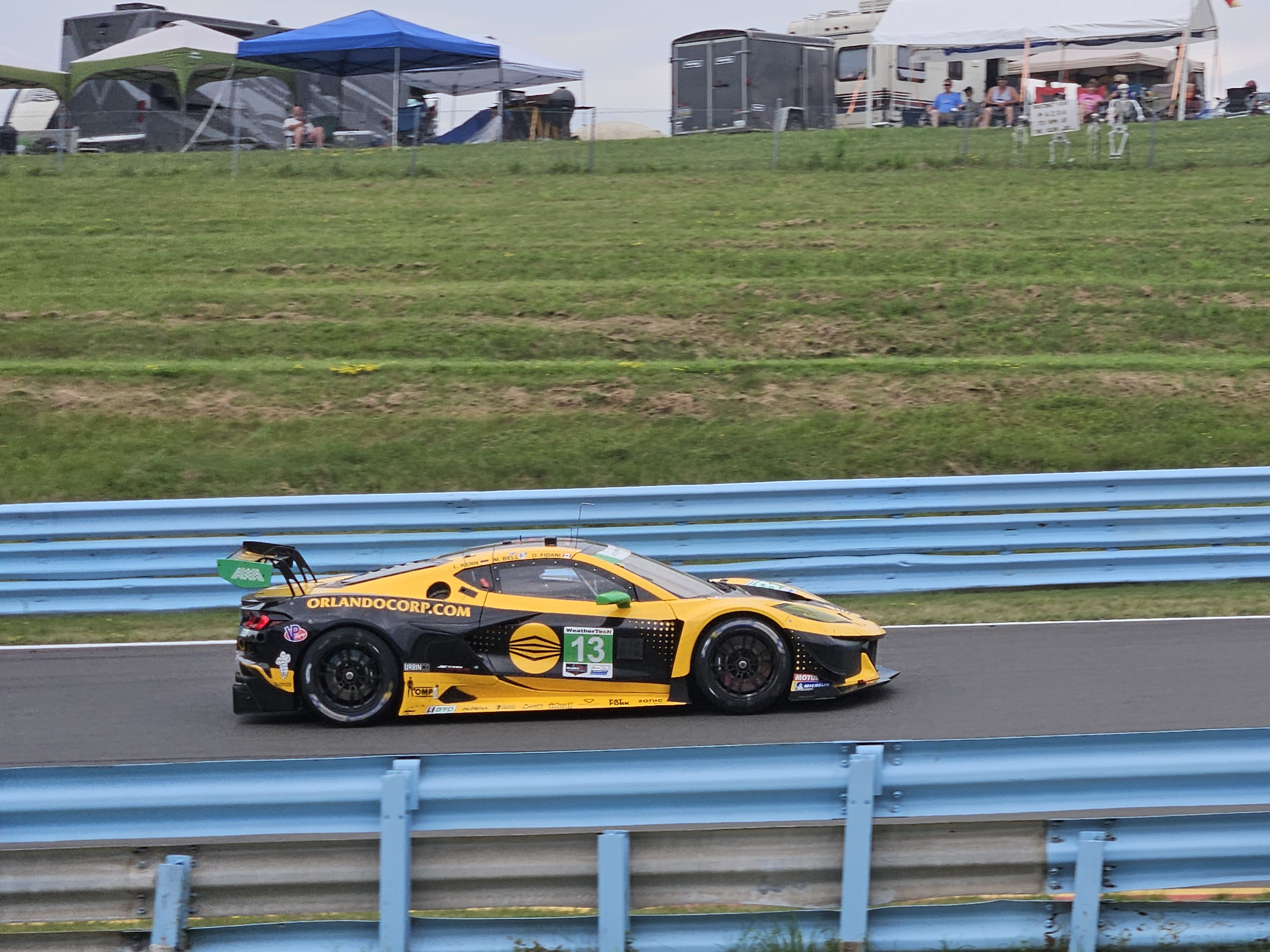
AWA's Chevrolet Corvette Z06 GT3.R at the 2024 Sahlen's Six Hours of the Glen

In August 2023, the team announced that they would move to the GTD class in the IMSA SportsCar Championship for 2024 and 2025. AWA would field two Chevrolet Corvette Z06 GT3.Rs full-time. The No. 13 entry included the returning Matt Bell and Orey Fidani for the full season, with Lars Kern and Alex Lynn joining for the select events. The full-time drivers for the No. 17 entry included Anthony Mantella and Nicolás Varrone, with Thomas Merrill and Charlie Eastwood racing at the endurance rounds. While they planned for the No. 17 to be a full-time entry, following two retirements in the first two races, Mantella decided to step away from the program and AWA. The team elected to scale back to a single car operation and put the No. 17 up for sale.

==== 2025 ====
For their first race in 2025, the #13 car of AWA racing won the 2025 24 Hours of Daytona in the GTD class, completing 772 laps.

== Racing record ==
=== Complete IMSA SportsCar Championship results ===
(key) (Races in bold indicate pole position; races in italics indicate fastest lap)

Year	Entrant	Class	No	Chassis	Engine	Drivers	Rounds											MEC	Pts	Pos.
Year	Entrant	Class	No	Chassis	Engine	Drivers	1	2	3	4	5	6	7	8	9	10	11	MEC	Pts	Pos.
2022	(Canada) AWA	LMP3	13	Duqueine M30 - D-08	Nissan VK56 V8 5.6L	(United Kingdom) Matt Bell (Canada) Orey Fidani (Germany) Lars Kern (Canada) Kyle Marcelli (Canada) Kuno Wittmer	DAY; 5	SEB; 4			MOH; 8			WGL; 9	MOS; 4	ELK; 2	ATL; 7	26	1716	6th
2022	(Canada) AWA	LMP3	76	Duqueine M30 - D-08	Nissan VK56 V8 5.6L	(Canada) Anthony Mantella (Canada) Kyle Marcelli (United States) Josh Sarchet	DAY	SEB			MOH			WGL	MOS		ATL; 6	6	250	13th
2023	(Canada) AWA	LMP3	13	Duqueine M30 - D-08	Nissan VK56 V8 5.6L	(United Kingdom) Matt Bell (Canada) Orey Fidani (Germany) Lars Kern (Germany) Moritz Kranz	DAY; 4	SEB; 2			WGL; 5	MOS; 4		ELK; 3		IMS; 5	ATL; 2	32	1882	3rd
2023	(Canada) AWA	LMP3	17	Duqueine M30 - D-08	Nissan VK56 V8 5.6L	(United Kingdom) Wayne Boyd (Canada) Anthony Mantella (Argentina) Nicolás Varrone (United States) Thomas Merrill	DAY; 1	SEB; 4			WGL; 3	MOS; 3		ELK; 5		IMS; 1	ATL; 6	34	1870	4th
2024	(Canada) AWA	GTD	13	Chevrolet Corvette Z06 GT3.R	Chevrolet LT6 5.5 L V8	(United Kingdom) Matt Bell (Canada) Orey Fidani (Germany) Lars Kern (United Kingdom) Alex Lynn	DAY; 21	SEB; 9	LBH; 6	LGA; 11		WGL; 7	MOS; 13	ELK; 5	VIR; 6	IMS; 6	ATL; 11	28	2288	9th
2024	(Canada) AWA	GTD	17	Chevrolet Corvette Z06 GT3.R	Chevrolet LT6 5.5 L V8	(Canada) Anthony Mantella (United States) Thomas Merrill (Argentina) Nicolás Varrone (Republic of Ireland) Charlie Eastwood	DAY; 18	SEB; 22	LBH	LGA		WGL	MOS	ELK	VIR	IMS	ATL	14	251	24th
2025	(Canada) AWA	GTD	13	Chevrolet Corvette Z06 GT3.R	Chevrolet LT6 5.5 L V8	(United Kingdom) Matt Bell (Canada) Orey Fidani (Germany) Lars Kern (Germany) Marvin Kirchhöfer	DAY; 1	SEB; 10	LBH; 13	LGA; 13		WGL; 9	MOS; 9	ELK; 7	VIR; 8	IMS; 6	ATL; 9	34	2461	7th
2026	(Canada) 13 Autosport	GTD	13	Chevrolet Corvette Z06 GT3.R	Chevrolet LT6 5.5 L V8	(Canada) Orey Fidani; TBA; TBA	DAY	SEB	LBH	LGA		WGL	MOS	ELK	VIR	IMS	ATL			

* Season still in progress.

=== 24 Hours of Le Mans results ===
Year	Entrant	No.	Car	Drivers	Class	Laps	Pos.	Class Pos.
2025	(Canada) AWA Racing	13	Chevrolet Corvette Z06 GT3.R	(United Kingdom) Matt Bell (Canada) Orey Fidani (Germany) Lars Kern	LMGT3	338	42nd	10th
