= 2020 Canadian Touring Car Championship =

Motor racing competition

The 2020 Canadian Touring Car Championship (known as CTCC presented by Pirelli for sponsorship reasons) is the thirteenth season of the Canadian Touring Car Championship. The season started on 25 July 2020 at the Canadian Tire Motorsport Park and is scheduled to end on 30 August 2020 at the Calabogie Motorsports Park.

Zachary Vanier won in the TCR class, while Orey Fidani won in GT class.

== Teams and drivers ==
All teams are Canadian-registered. Pirelli is the official tyre supplier.

Team	Car	No.	Drivers	Rounds	Ref.
M&S Racing	Honda Civic Type R TCR (FK8)	1	(Canada) Gary Kwok	All	
M&S Racing	Honda Civic Type R TCR (FK8)	55	(Canada) Tom Kwok	All	
Pfaff Motorsports	Audi RS 3 LMS TCR	9	(Canada) Zachary Vanier	All	
TWOth Autosport	Audi RS 3 LMS TCR	26	(Canada) Fareed Ali	1	
TWOth Autosport	Audi RS 3 LMS TCR	41	(Canada) Travis Hill	3	
TWOth Autosport	Audi RS 3 LMS TCR	48	(Canada) Ron Tomlinson	All	
GT Racing	Volkswagen Golf GTI TCR	45	(Canada) Louis-Philippe Montour	3	
Hyundai Racing Canada	Hyundai i30 N TCR	80	(Canada) Connor Attrell	All	
Hyundai Racing Canada	Hyundai Veloster N TCR	88	(Canada) Bob Attrell	All	
Mark Motors Racing	Audi RS 3 LMS TCR	82	(Canada) Marco Cirone	All	
Blanchet Motorsports	Audi RS 3 LMS TCR	84	(Canada) Damon Sharpe	All	
GT Sport Entry
AWA	McLaren 570S GT4	13	(Canada) Orey Fidani	All	

== Calendar and results ==
A provisional calendar was announced on 24 December 2019 with 12 races across Canada and the United States. Due to the COVID-19 pandemic the calendar was shortened to just six races across Canada.

Rnd.		Circuit	Date	Pole position	Fastest lap	GT Sport winner	TCR winner
1	1	Canadian Tire Motorsport Park, Bowmanville, Ontario	25 July	(Canada) Orey Fidani	(Canada) Orey Fidani	(Canada) Orey Fidani	(Canada) Gary Kwok
1	2	Canadian Tire Motorsport Park, Bowmanville, Ontario	26 July	(Canada) Orey Fidani	(Canada) Orey Fidani	(Canada) Orey Fidani	(Canada) Zachary Vanier
2	3	Shannonville Motorsport Park, Belleville, Ontario	15 August	(Canada) Orey Fidani	(Canada) Orey Fidani	(Canada) Orey Fidani	(Canada) Zachary Vanier
2	4	Shannonville Motorsport Park, Belleville, Ontario	16 August	(Canada) Orey Fidani	(Canada) Orey Fidani	(Canada) Orey Fidani	(Canada) Zachary Vanier
3	5	Calabogie Motorsports Park, Calabogie, Ontario	29 August	(Canada) Orey Fidani	(Canada) Orey Fidani	(Canada) Orey Fidani	(Canada) Zachary Vanier
3	6	Calabogie Motorsports Park, Calabogie, Ontario	30 August	(Canada) Orey Fidani	(Canada) Orey Fidani	(Canada) Orey Fidani	(Canada) Zachary Vanier
