= Zachary Vanier =

Canadian racing driver (born 2003)

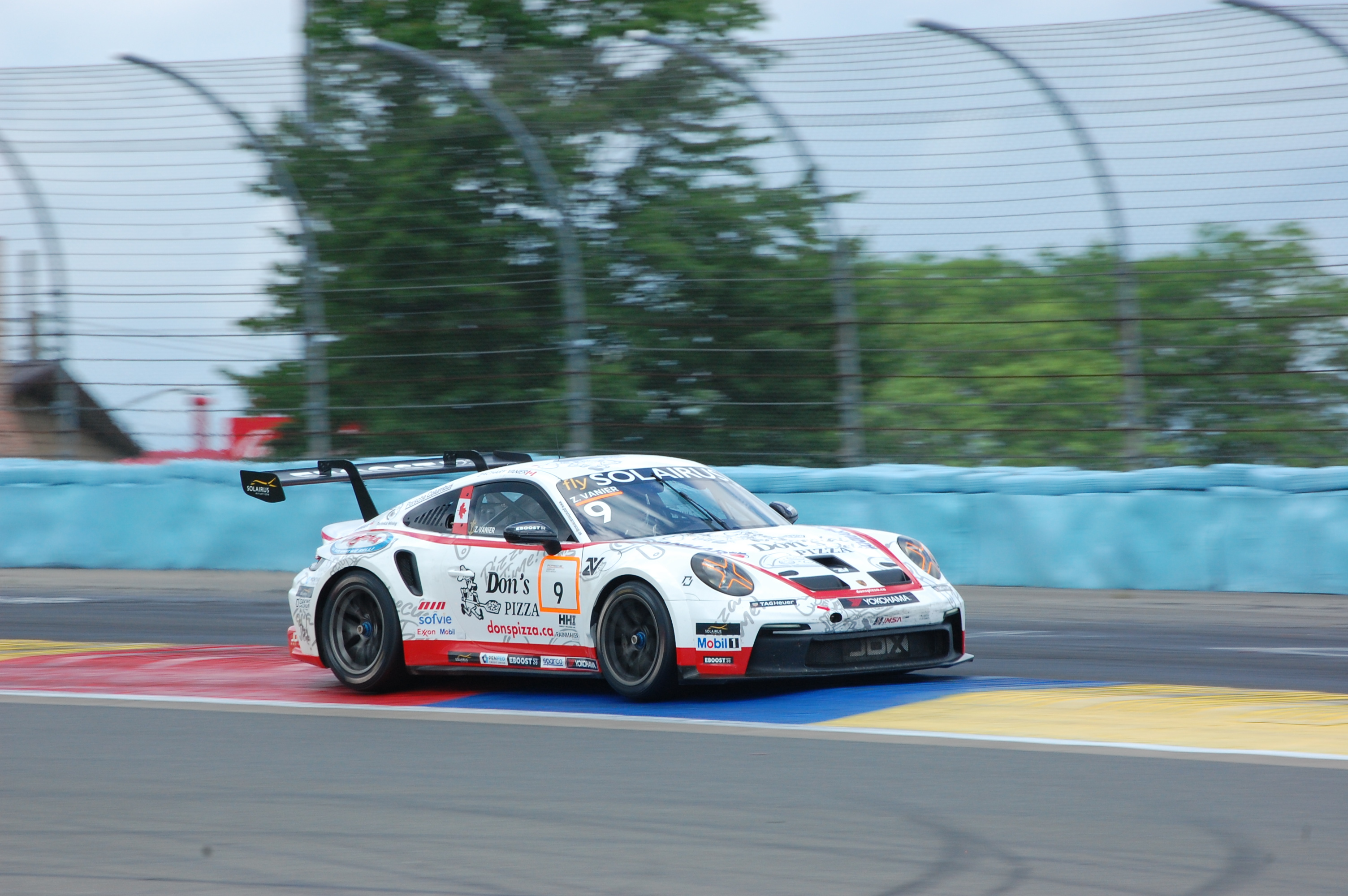
- Vanier in 2025
- Nationality: (Canada) Canadian
- Born: 9 June 2003 (age 23) Sudbury, Ontario, Canada
- Categorisation: FIA Silver

Championship titles
- 2023 2022 2020: Porsche Sprint Challenge North America – 992 Pro-Am; Sports Car Championship Canada – GT4; Canadian Touring Car Championship – TCR

Zachary Vanier (born 9 June 2003) is a Canadian racing driver who last competed in GT World Challenge America for McCann Racing. A Porsche Carrera Cup North America graduate, he made his IMSA debut in 2026 at Long Beach for Pfaff Motorsports.

== Career ==
Vanier began karting in 2013, competing until 2017. During his time in karting, Vanier most notably won the 2016 Canadian National Karting Championship in the Briggs & Stratton Junior category. Making his single-seater debut in the Canadian F1600 Championship Series and Formule 1600 Canada in 2018, Vanier finished fifth in the former's points and scored a lone win in the latter at Mont-Tremblant.

Returning to both series for 2019, Vanier found more success in the latter, scoring six wins and standing on the podium in all but one of the 18 races to secure runner-up honors in the Class A standings. At the end of 2019, Vanier also competed in the Formula Ford Festival for Cliff Dempsey Racing. Vanier then switched to TCR competition for 2020, as he joined Audi-affiliated Pfaff Motorsports to compete in the Canadian Touring Car Championship. In his only season in the series, Vanier won five of the six races he raced in as he secured the TCR title. A one-off appearance in the GT4 class of the Sports Car Championship Canada for Multimatic Motorsports then followed in 2021, before joining the series on a full-time basis for Pfaff Motorsports the following year. Racing a McLaren in the GT4 class, Vanier won six times and took two other podiums to clinch the class title at season's end.

Stepping up to Porsche Carrera Cup North America for JDX Racing in 2024, Vanier kicked off the year with a win at Miami, before scoring further wins at Road Atlanta and Circuit of the Americas en route to a third-place points finish. Remaining with JDX Racing for his sophomore season in the series, as a member of the Porsche North America Junior Program, Vanier took wins at Watkins Glen and Indianapolis, as well as seven other podiums to end the season third in points for the second year in a row.

Continuing with Porsche machinery for 2026, Vanier joined McCann Racing to make the step-up to GT3 competition in the Pro class of GT World Challenge America. In his first season in the series, Vanier took three Pro class podiums and a best overall result of fourth at Sebring to take fifth in the class standings. During 2026, Vanier also made his IMSA SportsCar Championship debut at Long Beach, competing in the GTD class in Pfaff Motorsports's Lamborghini Temerario GT3, before reappearing in the series at Petit Le Mans for Porsche customer team RS1.

== Karting record ==
=== Karting career summary ===
Season	Series	Team	Position
2013	Canadian National Karting – Mini Max		13th
2014	Canadian National Karting Championship – Briggs & Stratton Junior		8th
2015	Canadian National Karting – Rotax Junior		18th
2016	Canadian National Karting – Rotax Junior		16th
2016	Canadian National Karting Championship – Briggs & Stratton Junior		1st
2017	Coupe de Montreal – Briggs & Stratton Junior		6th

== Racing record ==
=== Racing career summary ===
Season	Series	Team	Races	Wins	Poles	F/Laps	Podiums	Points	Position
2018	Toyo Tires F1600 Championship Series Canada – Class A	BARC/Britain West Motorsport	18	0	0	2	5	225	5th
2018	Formule 1600 Canada			1					
2019	Toyo Tires F1600 Championship Series Canada – Class A	BARC	18	6	2	6	17	396	**2nd**
2019	Formule 1600 Canada								
2019	F1600 Championship Series	Britain West Motorsports	3	0	1	1	0	75	22nd
2019	Formula Ford Festival	Cliff Dempsey Racing/ Team Canada Scholarship	1	0	0	0	0	—N/a	DNF
2019	SCCA Majors Nationwide – Formula F		2	1	0	0	1	42	34th
2020	Canadian Touring Car Championship – TCR	Pfaff Motorsports	6	5	3	2	5	866	**1st**
2021	Sports Car Championship Canada – GT4	Multimatic Motorsports	2	0	0	0	2	70	**3rd**
2022	Sports Car Championship Canada – GT4	Pfaff Motorsports	10	6			8	429	**1st**
2022	Porsche Sprint Challenge North America – 991	MDK Motorsports	2	1			2	0	NC†
2023	Porsche Sprint Challenge North America – 992 Pro-Am	MDK Motorsports	14	12	5	10	14	704	**1st**
2024	Porsche Carrera Cup North America	JDX Racing	16	3	0	2	7	233	**3rd**
2024	Porsche Endurance Championship North America – GT3 Cup Pro-Am	MVII Racing by Regal Motorsports	4	0	0	0	0	131	10th
2025	Porsche Carrera Cup North America	JDX Racing	16	2	0	2	9	250	**3rd**
2025	Porsche Endurance Championship North America – GT3 Cup Pro-Am	JDX Racing	4	0	0	0	2	214	**2nd**
2026	GT World Challenge America – Pro	McCann Racing	7	0	0	0	3	103	5th
2026	Intercontinental GT Challenge	McCann Racing	1	0	0	0	0	1	30th
2026	IMSA SportsCar Championship – GTD	Pfaff Motorsports	1	0	0	0	0	405	54th
2026	IMSA SportsCar Championship – GTD	RS1	1	0	0	0	0	405	54th
2026	McLaren Trophy America – Pro-Am	Auto Eclectic Motorsports	2	0	0	0	0	0	NC†

^{†} As Vanier was a guest driver, he was ineligible to score points.

=== Complete Porsche Carrera Cup North America results ===
(key) (Races in bold indicate pole position) (Races in italics indicate fastest lap)

Year	Team	Class	1	2	3	4	5	6	7	8	9	10	11	12	13	14	15	16	Pos	Points
2024	JDX Racing	Pro	SEB; 1; 7	SEB; 2; 12	MIA; 1; 2	MIA; 2; 1	CGV; 1; 7	CGV; 2; 5	WGL; 1; 5	WGL; 2; 4	ROA; 1; 14	ROA; 2; 2	IMS; 1; 5	IMS; 2; 18	ATL; 1; 1	ATL; 2; 3	COT; 1; 1	COT; 2; 3	3rd	233
2025	JDX Racing	Pro	SEB; 1; 6	SEB; 2; 3	MIA; 1; 28	MIA; 2; 3	CGV; 1; 3	CGV; 2; 3	WGL; 1; 4	WGL; 2; 1	ROA; 1; 2	ROA; 2; 4	IMS; 1; 1	IMS; 2; 3	ATL; 1; 9	ATL; 2; 4	COT; 1; 4	COT; 2; 2	3rd	250

=== Complete IMSA SportsCar Championship results ===
(key) (Races in bold indicate pole position; results in italics indicate fastest lap)

Year	Team	Class	Make	Engine	1	2	3	4	5	6	7	8	9	10	Pos.	Points
2026	Pfaff Motorsports	GTD	Lamborghini Temerario GT3	Lamborghini L411 4.0 L Turbo V8	DAY	SEB	LBH; 14	LGA	WGL	MOS	ELK	VIR	IMS		54th	405
2026	RS1	GTD	Porsche 911 GT3 R (992.2)	Porsche M97/80 4.2 L Flat-6										PET; 12	54th	405
