= 2026 GT World Challenge America =

Nineteenth season of GT World Challenge America

The 2026 GT World Challenge America Powered by AWS was the twentieth season of the United States Auto Club's GT World Challenge America, and the ninth under ownership of SRO Motorsports Group.

The season began at Sonoma on March 27, and finished at Indianapolis on October 10.

== Calendar ==
The preliminary calendar released on June 27, 2025, at the SRO's annual 24 Hours of Spa press conference, featuring 7 races across seven rounds. On August 13, 2025, the calendar was finalized, with Road America and the return to Road Atlanta for the first time since 2011. However on September 19, 2025, it was announced that the round at Sebring International Raceway was shifted one week earlier.

Round	Circuit	Date	Map
1	Sonoma Raceway, Sonoma, California	March 27–29	2026 GT World Challenge America is located in the United States
2	Circuit of the Americas, Austin, Texas	April 24–26	2026 GT World Challenge America is located in the United States
3	Sebring International Raceway, Sebring, Florida	May 8–10	2026 GT World Challenge America is located in the United States
4	(Georgia (U.S. state)) Road Atlanta, Braselton, Georgia	June 12–14	2026 GT World Challenge America is located in the United States
5	Road America, Elkhart Lake, Wisconsin	August 28–30	2026 GT World Challenge America is located in the United States
6	Barber Motorsports Park, Birmingham, Alabama	September 25–27	2026 GT World Challenge America is located in the United States
7	Indianapolis Motor Speedway, Indianapolis, Indiana	October 8–10	2026 GT World Challenge America is located in the United States

== Entry list ==
Team	Car	Engine	No.	Drivers	Class	Rounds
(United States) HP-Tech Motorsport	Ferrari 296 GT3 Evo	Ferrari F163CE 3.0 L Turbo V6	04	(Australia) Scott Andrews	PA	5–6
(United States) HP-Tech Motorsport	Ferrari 296 GT3 Evo	Ferrari F163CE 3.0 L Turbo V6	04	(United States) Tony Davis	PA	5–6
(United States) Kellymoss	Porsche 911 GT3 R (992.1) 1 Porsche 911 GT3 R (992.2) 2–7	Porsche M97/80 4.2 L Flat-6	017	(United States) Colin Braun	PA	All
(United States) Kellymoss	Porsche 911 GT3 R (992.1) 1 Porsche 911 GT3 R (992.2) 2–7	Porsche M97/80 4.2 L Flat-6	017	(United States) Michael Clark	PA	All
(United States) Kellymoss	Porsche 911 GT3 R (992.1) 1 Porsche 911 GT3 R (992.2) 2–7	Porsche M97/80 4.2 L Flat-6	017	(Germany) Lars Kern	PA	7
(United States) Kellymoss	Porsche 911 GT3 R (992.1) 1 Porsche 911 GT3 R (992.2) 2–7	Porsche M97/80 4.2 L Flat-6	13	(United States) Riley Dickinson	PA	All
(United States) Kellymoss	Porsche 911 GT3 R (992.1) 1 Porsche 911 GT3 R (992.2) 2–7	Porsche M97/80 4.2 L Flat-6	13	(United States) Todd Parriott	PA	All
(United States) Kellymoss	Porsche 911 GT3 R (992.1) 1 Porsche 911 GT3 R (992.2) 2–7	Porsche M97/80 4.2 L Flat-6	13	(Netherlands) Kay van Berlo	PA	7
(United States) Kellymoss	Porsche 911 GT3 R (992.1) 1 Porsche 911 GT3 R (992.2) 2–7	Porsche M97/80 4.2 L Flat-6	88	(United States) John Gilliland	PA	All
(United States) Kellymoss	Porsche 911 GT3 R (992.1) 1 Porsche 911 GT3 R (992.2) 2–7	Porsche M97/80 4.2 L Flat-6	88	(Netherlands) Loek Hartog	PA	All
(United States) Kellymoss	Porsche 911 GT3 R (992.1) 1 Porsche 911 GT3 R (992.2) 2–7	Porsche M97/80 4.2 L Flat-6	88	(United States) Aaron Jeansonne	PA	7
(United States) Dollahite Racing	Ford Mustang GT3 Evo	Ford Coyote 5.4 L V8	6	(United States) Cameron Lawrence	P	1–5
(United States) Dollahite Racing	Ford Mustang GT3 Evo	Ford Coyote 5.4 L V8	6	(United Kingdom) Alex Sedgwick	P	1–5
(United States) Dollahite Racing	Ford Mustang GT3 Evo	Ford Coyote 5.4 L V8	6	(United Kingdom) Alex Sedgwick	PA	7
(United States) Dollahite Racing	Ford Mustang GT3 Evo	Ford Coyote 5.4 L V8	6	(United States) Scott Dollahite	PA	7
(United States) Dollahite Racing	Ford Mustang GT3 Evo	Ford Coyote 5.4 L V8	6	(Germany) Christopher Mies	PA	7
(United States) McCann Racing	Porsche 911 GT3 R (992.2)	Porsche M97/80 4.2 L Flat-6	8	(United States) Michael McCann Jr.	P	All
(United States) McCann Racing	Porsche 911 GT3 R (992.2)	Porsche M97/80 4.2 L Flat-6	8	(Canada) Zachary Vanier	P	All
(United States) McCann Racing	Porsche 911 GT3 R (992.2)	Porsche M97/80 4.2 L Flat-6	8	(Belgium) Alessio Picariello	P	7
(United States) TR3 Racing	Mercedes-AMG GT3 Evo	Mercedes-AMG M159 6.2 L V8	9	(United States) Brayton Williams	PA	All
(United States) TR3 Racing	Mercedes-AMG GT3 Evo	Mercedes-AMG M159 6.2 L V8	9	(New Zealand) Will Bamber	PA	1
(United States) TR3 Racing	Mercedes-AMG GT3 Evo	Mercedes-AMG M159 6.2 L V8	9	(Canada) Daniel Morad	PA	2–7
(United States) TR3 Racing	Mercedes-AMG GT3 Evo	Mercedes-AMG M159 6.2 L V8	9	(Netherlands) Indy Dontje	PA	7
(United States) MAD Joker by Lone Star Racing	Mercedes-AMG GT3 Evo	Mercedes-AMG M159 6.2 L V8	11	(United States) Marc Austin	Am	2, 7
(United States) MAD Joker by Lone Star Racing	Mercedes-AMG GT3 Evo	Mercedes-AMG M159 6.2 L V8	11	(United States) Jason Golan	Am	2
(United States) MAD Joker by Lone Star Racing	Mercedes-AMG GT3 Evo	Mercedes-AMG M159 6.2 L V8	11	(Republic of Ireland) Peter Dempsey	Am	7
(United States) MAD Joker by Lone Star Racing	Mercedes-AMG GT3 Evo	Mercedes-AMG M159 6.2 L V8	11	(United States) Ben Keating	Am	7
(United States) Mercedes-AMG Team Lone Star Racing	Mercedes-AMG GT3 Evo	Mercedes-AMG M159 6.2 L V8	80	(Netherlands) Lin Hodenius	P	7
(United States) Mercedes-AMG Team Lone Star Racing	Mercedes-AMG GT3 Evo	Mercedes-AMG M159 6.2 L V8	80	(Spain) Álex Palou	P	7
(United States) Mercedes-AMG Team Lone Star Racing	Mercedes-AMG GT3 Evo	Mercedes-AMG M159 6.2 L V8	80	(Germany) Luca Stolz	P	7
(Italy) AF Corse USA	Ferrari 296 GT3 Evo	Ferrari F163CE 3.0 L Turbo V6	12	(Argentina) Matías Pérez Companc	P	All
(Italy) AF Corse USA	Ferrari 296 GT3 Evo	Ferrari F163CE 3.0 L Turbo V6	12	(Denmark) Frederik Schandorff	P	1–4, 6–7
(Italy) AF Corse USA	Ferrari 296 GT3 Evo	Ferrari F163CE 3.0 L Turbo V6	12	(Spain) Miguel Molina	P	5
(Italy) AF Corse USA	Ferrari 296 GT3 Evo	Ferrari F163CE 3.0 L Turbo V6	12	(Denmark) Nicklas Nielsen	P	7
(Italy) AF Corse USA	Ferrari 296 GT3 Evo	Ferrari F163CE 3.0 L Turbo V6	163	(United States) Jay Schreibman	Am	All
(Italy) AF Corse USA	Ferrari 296 GT3 Evo	Ferrari F163CE 3.0 L Turbo V6	163	(Brazil) Oswaldo Negri Jr.	Am	1–3, 6–7
(Italy) AF Corse USA	Ferrari 296 GT3 Evo	Ferrari F163CE 3.0 L Turbo V6	163	(Denmark) Benny Simonsen	Am	4–5, 7
(United States) Riley Technologies	BMW GT3 Evo	BMW P58 3.0 L Turbo I6	14	(United States) Andy Lee	PA	All
(United States) Riley Technologies	BMW GT3 Evo	BMW P58 3.0 L Turbo I6	14	(United States) Slade Stewart	PA	All
(United States) Riley Technologies	BMW GT3 Evo	BMW P58 3.0 L Turbo I6	14	(Finland) Jesse Krohn	PA	7
(United States) Triarsi Competizione	Ferrari 296 GT3	Ferrari F163CE 3.0 L Turbo V6	18	(Italy) Riccardo Agostini	PA	2–3, 5
(United States) Triarsi Competizione	Ferrari 296 GT3	Ferrari F163CE 3.0 L Turbo V6	18	(United States) Sebastian Mascaro	PA	2–3, 5
(Canada) JMF Motorsports	Mercedes-AMG GT3 Evo	Mercedes-AMG M159 6.2 L V8	27	(United States) Jason Daskalos	PA	All
(Canada) JMF Motorsports	Mercedes-AMG GT3 Evo	Mercedes-AMG M159 6.2 L V8	27	(United Kingdom) Lorcan Hanafin	PA	1–3
(Canada) JMF Motorsports	Mercedes-AMG GT3 Evo	Mercedes-AMG M159 6.2 L V8	27	(Switzerland) Philip Ellis	PA	4–7
(Canada) JMF Motorsports	Mercedes-AMG GT3 Evo	Mercedes-AMG M159 6.2 L V8	27	(United States) Wyatt Brichacek	PA	7
(Canada) JMF Motorsports	Mercedes-AMG GT3 Evo	Mercedes-AMG M159 6.2 L V8	34	(Canada) Mikaël Grenier	P	All
(Canada) JMF Motorsports	Mercedes-AMG GT3 Evo	Mercedes-AMG M159 6.2 L V8	34	(United States) Michai Stephens	P	All
(Canada) JMF Motorsports	Mercedes-AMG GT3 Evo	Mercedes-AMG M159 6.2 L V8	34	(Belgium) Maxime Martin	P	7
(United States) RS1	Porsche 911 GT3 R (992.1) 1 Porsche 911 GT3 R (992.2) 2–7	Porsche M97/80 4.2 L Flat-6	28	(Belgium) Jan Heylen	PA	All
(United States) RS1	Porsche 911 GT3 R (992.1) 1 Porsche 911 GT3 R (992.2) 2–7	Porsche M97/80 4.2 L Flat-6	28	(Colombia) JP Martinez	PA	1–4
(United States) RS1	Porsche 911 GT3 R (992.1) 1 Porsche 911 GT3 R (992.2) 2–7	Porsche M97/80 4.2 L Flat-6	28	(United States) Danny Dyszelski	PA	5–7
(United States) RS1	Porsche 911 GT3 R (992.1) 1 Porsche 911 GT3 R (992.2) 2–7	Porsche M97/80 4.2 L Flat-6	28	(Netherlands) "Daan Arrow"	PA	7
(United States) Turner Motorsport	BMW M4 GT3 Evo	BMW P58 3.0 L Turbo I6	29	(United States) Robby Foley	P	All
(United States) Turner Motorsport	BMW M4 GT3 Evo	BMW P58 3.0 L Turbo I6	29	(United States) Justin Rothberg	P	All
(United States) Turner Motorsport	BMW M4 GT3 Evo	BMW P58 3.0 L Turbo I6	29	(United States) Connor De Phillippi	P	7
(United States) Wright Motorsports	Porsche 911 GT3 R (992.1) 1 Porsche 911 GT3 R (992.2) 2–7	Porsche M97/80 4.2 L Flat-6	31	(United States) Dave Musial Jr.	PA	All
(United States) Wright Motorsports	Porsche 911 GT3 R (992.1) 1 Porsche 911 GT3 R (992.2) 2–7	Porsche M97/80 4.2 L Flat-6	31	(New Zealand) Ryan Yardley	PA	All
(United States) Wright Motorsports	Porsche 911 GT3 R (992.1) 1 Porsche 911 GT3 R (992.2) 2–7	Porsche M97/80 4.2 L Flat-6	31	(Germany) Laurin Heinrich	PA	7
(United States) Wright Motorsports	Porsche 911 GT3 R (992.1) 1 Porsche 911 GT3 R (992.2) 2–7	Porsche M97/80 4.2 L Flat-6	242	(United States) Therese Lahlouh	PA	1–6
(United States) Wright Motorsports	Porsche 911 GT3 R (992.1) 1 Porsche 911 GT3 R (992.2) 2–7	Porsche M97/80 4.2 L Flat-6	242	(United States) Thomas Merrill	PA	1–6
(United States) Wright Motorsports	Porsche 911 GT3 R (992.1) 1 Porsche 911 GT3 R (992.2) 2–7	Porsche M97/80 4.2 L Flat-6	120	(United States) Thomas Merrill	P	7
(United States) Wright Motorsports	Porsche 911 GT3 R (992.1) 1 Porsche 911 GT3 R (992.2) 2–7	Porsche M97/80 4.2 L Flat-6	120	(France) Kévin Estre	P	7
(United States) Wright Motorsports	Porsche 911 GT3 R (992.1) 1 Porsche 911 GT3 R (992.2) 2–7	Porsche M97/80 4.2 L Flat-6	120	(Netherlands) Morris Schuring	P	7
(United States) GMG Racing	Porsche 911 GT3 R (992.2)	Porsche M97/80 4.2 L Flat-6	32	(United States) Kyle Washington	PA	All
(United States) GMG Racing	Porsche 911 GT3 R (992.2)	Porsche M97/80 4.2 L Flat-6	32	(Australia) Tom Sargent	PA	1–6
(United States) GMG Racing	Porsche 911 GT3 R (992.2)	Porsche M97/80 4.2 L Flat-6	32	(Turkey) Ayhancan Güven	PA	7
(United States) GMG Racing	Porsche 911 GT3 R (992.2)	Porsche M97/80 4.2 L Flat-6	32	(Italy) Riccardo Pera	PA	7
(United States) Chouest Povoledo Racing	Chevrolet Corvette Z06 GT3.R	Chevrolet LT6.R 5.5 L V8	50	(United States) Ross Chouest	PA	1–3, 5–7
(United States) Chouest Povoledo Racing	Chevrolet Corvette Z06 GT3.R	Chevrolet LT6.R 5.5 L V8	50	(Canada) Aaron Povoledo	PA	1–3, 5–7
(United States) Chicago Performance and Tuning Co.	Lamborghini Huracán GT3 Evo 2	Lamborghini DGF 5.2 L V10	64	(United States) Nicolai Elghanayan	PA	1, 5, 7
(United States) Chicago Performance and Tuning Co.	Lamborghini Huracán GT3 Evo 2	Lamborghini DGF 5.2 L V10	64	(Norway) Mads Siljehaug	PA	1, 5, 7
(United States) Chicago Performance and Tuning Co.	Lamborghini Huracán GT3 Evo 2	Lamborghini DGF 5.2 L V10	64	(Italy) Loris Spinelli	PA	7
(United States) Scuderia Corsa	Ferrari 296 GT3 5 Ferrari 296 GT3 Evo 7	Ferrari F163CE 3.0 L Turbo V6	67	(United States) Mitchell Green	Am	5, 7
(United States) Scuderia Corsa	Ferrari 296 GT3 5 Ferrari 296 GT3 Evo 7	Ferrari F163CE 3.0 L Turbo V6	67	(United States) Jon Morley	Am	5
(United States) Scuderia Corsa	Ferrari 296 GT3 5 Ferrari 296 GT3 Evo 7	Ferrari F163CE 3.0 L Turbo V6	67	(United States) Conrad Grunewald	Am	7
(United States) Scuderia Corsa	Ferrari 296 GT3 5 Ferrari 296 GT3 Evo 7	Ferrari F163CE 3.0 L Turbo V6	67	(United Kingdom) Jamie Morrow	Am	7
(United States) Archangel Motorsports	McLaren 720S GT3 Evo	McLaren M840T 4.0 L Turbo V8	69	(United States) Todd Coleman	PA	All
(United States) Archangel Motorsports	McLaren 720S GT3 Evo	McLaren M840T 4.0 L Turbo V8	69	(United States) Aaron Telitz	PA	All
(United States) Archangel Motorsports	McLaren 720S GT3 Evo	McLaren M840T 4.0 L Turbo V8	69	(United Kingdom) Tom Fleming	PA	7
(United States) Rebel Rock Racing	Aston Martin Vantage AMR GT3 Evo	Aston Martin AMR16A 4.0 L Turbo V8	71	(United States) Frank DePew	PA	All
(United States) Rebel Rock Racing	Aston Martin Vantage AMR GT3 Evo	Aston Martin AMR16A 4.0 L Turbo V8	71	(United Kingdom) Robin Liddell	PA	All
(United States) Rebel Rock Racing	Aston Martin Vantage AMR GT3 Evo	Aston Martin AMR16A 4.0 L Turbo V8	71	(United States) Andrew Davis	PA	7
(San Marino) Tsunami RT	Porsche 911 GT3 R (992.2)	Porsche M97/80 4.2 L Flat-6	79	(Italy) Fabio Babini	PA	7
(San Marino) Tsunami RT	Porsche 911 GT3 R (992.2)	Porsche M97/80 4.2 L Flat-6	79	(Switzerland) Alex Fontana	PA	7
(San Marino) Tsunami RT	Porsche 911 GT3 R (992.2)	Porsche M97/80 4.2 L Flat-6	79	(Italy) Johannes Zelger	PA	7
(Denmark) High Class Racing	Porsche 911 GT3 R (992.2)	Porsche M97/80 4.2 L Flat-6	86	(Denmark) Anders Fjordbach	PA	7
(Denmark) High Class Racing	Porsche 911 GT3 R (992.2)	Porsche M97/80 4.2 L Flat-6	86	(China) Kerong Li	PA	7
(Denmark) High Class Racing	Porsche 911 GT3 R (992.2)	Porsche M97/80 4.2 L Flat-6	86	(China) Ye Hongli	PA	7
(Germany) Herberth Motorsport	Porsche 911 GT3 R (992.2)	Porsche M97/80 4.2 L Flat-6	91	(Germany) Ralf Bohn	PA	7
(Germany) Herberth Motorsport	Porsche 911 GT3 R (992.2)	Porsche M97/80 4.2 L Flat-6	91	(Germany) Alfred Renauer	PA	7
(Germany) Herberth Motorsport	Porsche 911 GT3 R (992.2)	Porsche M97/80 4.2 L Flat-6	91	(Germany) Robert Renauer	PA	7
(United States) Random Vandals Racing	BMW M4 GT3 Evo	BMW P58 3.0 L Turbo I6	99	(United States) Derek DeBoer	PA	All
(United States) Random Vandals Racing	BMW M4 GT3 Evo	BMW P58 3.0 L Turbo I6	99	(Sweden) Hampus Ericsson	PA	All
(United States) Random Vandals Racing	BMW M4 GT3 Evo	BMW P58 3.0 L Turbo I6	99	(Sweden) Marcus Ericsson	PA	7
(Germany) GetSpeed Team PCX	Mercedes-AMG GT3 Evo	Mercedes-AMG M159 6.2 L V8	999	(France) Jordan Boisson	PA	7
(Germany) GetSpeed Team PCX	Mercedes-AMG GT3 Evo	Mercedes-AMG M159 6.2 L V8	999	(France) Patrick Charlaix	PA	7
(Germany) GetSpeed Team PCX	Mercedes-AMG GT3 Evo	Mercedes-AMG M159 6.2 L V8	999	(France) Marvin Klein	PA	7

Icon	Class
P	Pro
PA	Pro-Am
Am	Am
	GT Academy Entrant

== Race results ==
Bold indicates overall winner

Round	Circuit	Pole position	Pro Winners	Pro-Am Winners	Am Winners	Results
1	(California) Sonoma	(Canada) #34 JMF Motorsports	**(Canada) #34 JMF Motorsports**	(United States) #32 GMG Racing	(Italy) #163 AF Corse USA	Report
1	(California) Sonoma	(Canada) Mikaël Grenier (United States) Michai Stephens	**(Canada) Mikaël Grenier** **(United States) Michai Stephens**	(Australia) Tom Sargent (United States) Kyle Washington	(Brazil) Oswaldo Negri Jr. (United States) Jay Schreibman	Report
2	(Texas) Austin	(Canada) #34 JMF Motorsports	(Canada) #34 JMF Motorsports	**(United States) #31 Wright Motorsports**	(Italy) #163 AF Corse USA	Report
2	(Texas) Austin	(Canada) Mikaël Grenier (United States) Michai Stephens	(Canada) Mikaël Grenier (United States) Michai Stephens	**(United States) Dave Musial Jr.** **(New Zealand) Ryan Yardley**	(Brazil) Oswaldo Negri Jr. (United States) Jay Schreibman	Report
3	(Florida) Sebring	(Canada) #34 JMF Motorsports	**(United States) #29 Turner Motorsport**	(United States) #32 GMG Racing	(Italy) #163 AF Corse USA	Report
3	(Florida) Sebring	(Canada) Mikaël Grenier (United States) Michai Stephens	**(United States) Robby Foley** **(United States) Justin Rothberg**	(Australia) Tom Sargent (United States) Kyle Washington	(Brazil) Oswaldo Negri Jr. (United States) Jay Schreibman	Report
4	(Georgia (U.S. state)) Road Atlanta	(Italy) #12 AF Corse USA	(Italy) #12 AF Corse USA	**(Canada) #27 JMF Motorsports**	(Italy) #163 AF Corse USA	Report
4	(Georgia (U.S. state)) Road Atlanta	(Argentina) Matías Pérez Companc (Denmark) Frederik Schandorff	(Argentina) Matías Pérez Companc (Denmark) Frederik Schandorff	**(United States) Jason Daskalos** **(Switzerland) Philip Ellis**	(United States) Jay Schreibman (Denmark) Benny Simonsen	Report
5	(Wisconsin) Road America	(Italy) #12 AF Corse USA	**(United States) #29 Turner Motorsport**	(United States) #9 TR3 Racing	(United States) #67 Scuderia Corsa	Report
5	(Wisconsin) Road America	(Argentina) Matías Pérez Companc (Spain) Miguel Molina	**(United States) Robby Foley** **(United States) Justin Rothberg**	(Canada) Daniel Morad (United States) Brayton Williams	(United States) Mitchell Green (United States) Jon Morley	Report
6	(Alabama) Barber	(Italy) #12 AF Corse USA	**(Italy) #12 AF Corse USA**	(United States) #69 Archangel Motorsports	(Italy) #163 AF Corse USA	Report
6	(Alabama) Barber	(Argentina) Matías Pérez Companc (Denmark) Frederik Schandorff	**(Argentina) Matías Pérez Companc** **(Denmark) Frederik Schandorff**	(United States) Todd Coleman (United States) Aaron Telitz	(Brazil) Oswaldo Negri Jr. (United States) Jay Schreibman	Report
7	(Indiana) Indianapolis	(United States) #29 Turner Motorsport	(United States) #29 Turner Motorsport	**(United States) #32 GMG Racing**	(United States) #11 MAD Joker by Lone Star Racing	Report
7	(Indiana) Indianapolis	(United States) Connor De Phillippi (United States) Robby Foley (United States) Justin Rothberg	(United States) Connor De Phillippi (United States) Robby Foley (United States) Justin Rothberg	**(Turkey) Ayhancan Güven** **(Italy) Riccardo Pera** **(United States) Kyle Washington**	(United States) Marc Austin (Republic of Ireland) Peter Dempsey (United States) Ben Keating	Report

== Championship standings ==
Scoring system

Championship points are awarded for the first ten positions in each race. Individual drivers are required to participate for a minimum of 40 minutes in order to earn championship points in any race. Race-by-race entries which only participated in either of the final two races of the season are not eligible for points.

Standard Points

Position	1st	2nd	3rd	4th	5th	6th	7th	8th	9th	10th
Points	25	18	15	12	10	8	6	4	2	1

Indianapolis Points

Position	1st	2nd	3rd	4th	5th	6th	7th	8th	9th	10th
Points	50	36	30	24	20	16	12	8	4	2

=== Drivers' championship ===
==== Pro ====
Pos.	Driver	Team	SON	AUS	SEB	ATL	ELK	BAR	IND	Points
1	(United States) Robby Foley (United States) Justin Rothberg	(United States) Turner Motorsport	6^{F}	4	1	16†	1^{F}	6	3^{P}	154
2	(Canada) Mikaël Grenier (United States) Michai Stephens	(Canada) JMF Motorsports	1^{P}	2^{P}^{F}	18†^{P}	6	2	2	5	144
3	(Argentina) Matías Pérez Companc	(Italy) AF Corse USA	2	19	3^{F}	2^{PF}	17†^{P}	1^{PF}	4^{F}	141
4	(Denmark) Frederik Schandorff	(Italy) AF Corse USA	2	19	3^{F}	2^{PF}		1^{PF}	4^{F}	131
5	(United States) Michael McCann Jr. (Canada) Zachary Vanier	(United States) McCann Racing	13	8	4	8	12	5	11	103
6	(United States) Cameron Lawrence (United Kingdom) Alex Sedgwick	(United States) Dollahite Racing	5	20	2	17†	11			68
7	(Spain) Miguel Molina	(Italy) AF Corse USA					17†^{P}			10
Drivers ineligible to score points
–	(United States) Connor De Phillippi	(United States) Turner Motorsport							3^{P}	0
–	(Denmark) Nicklas Nielsen	(Italy) AF Corse USA							4^{F}	0
–	(Belgium) Maxime Martin	(Canada) JMF Motorsports							5	0
–	(France) Kévin Estre (United States) Thomas Merrill (Netherlands) Morris Schuring	(United States) Wright Motorsports							9	0
–	(Belgium) Alessio Picariello	(United States) McCann Racing							11	0
–	(Netherlands) Lin Hodenius (Spain) Álex Palou (Germany) Luca Stolz	(United States) Mercedes-AMG Team Lone Star Racing							27†	0
Pos.	Driver	Team	SON	AUS	SEB	ATL	ELK	BAR	IND	Points

Key
Colour	Result
Gold	Race winner
Silver	2nd place
Bronze	3rd place
Green	Points finish
Blue	Non-points finish
Blue	Non-classified finish (NC)
Purple	Did not finish (Ret)
Black	Disqualified (DSQ)
Black	Excluded (EX)
White	Did not start (DNS)
White	Race cancelled (C)
White	Withdrew (WD)
Blank	Did not participate

^{P} – Pole
^{F} – Fastest lap

Notes

- † – Drivers did not finish the race but were classified, as they had started the race.

==== Pro-Am ====
Pos.	Driver	Team	SON	AUS	SEB	ATL	ELK	BAR	IND	Points
1	(United States) Kyle Washington	(United States) GMG Racing	3^{F}	6^{F}	5^{F}	4^{F}	19†	7	1^{PF}	142
2	(United States) Dave Musial Jr. (New Zealand) Ryan Yardley	(United States) Wright Motorsports	4	1	8	7	5	11	6	116
3	(United States) Todd Coleman (United States) Aaron Telitz	(United States) Archangel Motorsports	15	18	20†	3^{P}	14	3^{F}	2	82
4	(United States) Jason Daskalos	(Canada) JMF Motorsports	14^{P}	21†^{P}	7	1	7	8	25†	64
5	(United States) Danny Dyszelski	(United States) RS1					4	4^{P}	7	60
6	(United States) Colin Braun (United States) Michael Clark	(United States) Kellymoss	10	11	13	5	20†	12	12	50
7	(United States) Brayton Williams	(United States) TR3 Racing	17	13	10	10	3	17†	15	48
8	(Canada) Daniel Morad	(United States) TR3 Racing		13	10	10	3	17†	15	48
9	(Colombia) JP Martinez	(United States) RS1	7	5	6	18†				48
10	(United States) Therese Lahlouh	(United States) Wright Motorsports	9	3	12	15	6	DNS		44
11	(United States) Andy Lee (United States) Slade Stewart	(United States) Riley Technologies	18†	7	11	9	15†	13	14	39
12	(United States) Derek DeBoer (Sweden) Hampus Ericsson	(United States) Random Vandals Racing	11	12	19†	19†	10	15	13	30
13	(Italy) Riccardo Agostini (United States) Sebastian Mascaro	(United States) Triarsi Competizione		9	9^{P}		8^{P}			26
14	(United States) Riley Dickinson (United States) Todd Parriott	(United States) Kellymoss	8	14	15	11	18†	10	23†	24
15	(United States) Nicolai Elghanayan (Norway) Mads Siljehaug	(United States) Chicago Performance and Tuning Co	12				13^{F}		16	12
16	(United States) John Gilliland (Netherlands) Loek Hartog	(United States) Kellymoss	WD	10	14	12	23†	18†	22	11
17	(Australia) Scott Andrews (United States) Tony Davis	(United States) HP-Tech Motorsport					22†	9		10
18	(United States) Frank DePew (United Kingdom) Robin Liddell	(United States) Rebel Rock Racing		17	17	13	21†	14	24†	2
19	(United States) Ross Chouest (Canada) Aaron Povoledo	(United States) Chouest Povoledo Racing	DNS	DNS	WD		DNS	DNS	WD	0
Drivers ineligible to score points
–	(Switzerland) Philip Ellis	(Canada) JMF Motorsports				1	7	8	25†	0
–	(Turkey) Ayhancan Güven (Italy) Riccardo Pera	(United States) GMG Racing							1^{PF}	0
–	(United Kingdom) Tom Fleming	(United States) Archangel Motorsports							2	0
–	(Australia) Tom Sargent	(United States) GMG Racing	3^{F}	6^{F}	5^{F}	4^{F}	19†	7		0
–	(United States) Thomas Merrill	(United States) Wright Motorsports	9	3	12	15	6	DNS		0
–	(Belgium) Jan Heylen	(United States) RS1	7	5	6	18†	4	4^{P}	7	0
–	(Germany) Laurin Heinrich	(United States) Wright Motorsports							6	0
–	(United Kingdom) Lorcan Hanafin	(Canada) JMF Motorsports	14^{P}	21†^{P}	7					0
–	(Netherlands) "Daan Arrow"	(United States) RS1							7	0
–	(Germany) Ralf Bohn (Germany) Alfred Renauer (Germany) Robert Renauer	(Germany) Herberth Motorsport							8	0
–	(Denmark) Anders Fjordbach (China) Kerong Li (China) Ye Hongli	(Denmark) High Class Racing							10	0
–	(Germany) Lars Kern	(United States) Kellymoss							12	0
–	(Sweden) Marcus Ericsson	(United States) Random Vandals Racing							13	0
–	(Finland) Jesse Krohn	(United States) Riley Technologies							14	0
–	(Netherlands) Indy Dontje	(United States) TR3 Racing							15	0
–	(Italy) Loris Spinelli	(United States) Chicago Performance and Tuning Co.							16	0
–	(New Zealand) Will Bamber	(United States) TR3 Racing	17							0
–	(Italy) Fabio Babini (Switzerland) Alex Fontana (Italy) Johannes Zelger	(San Marino) Tsunami RT							19	0
–	(France) Jordan Boisson (France) Patrick Charlaix (France) Marvin Klein	(Germany) GetSpeed Team PCX							20	0
–	(United States) Aaron Jeansonne	(United States) Kellymoss							22	0
–	(Netherlands) Kay van Berlo	(United States) Kellymoss							23†	0
–	(United States) Andrew Davis	(United States) Rebel Rock Racing							24†	0
–	(United States) Wyatt Brichacek	(Canada) JMF Motorsports							25†	0
–	(United States) Scott Dollahite (Germany) Christopher Mies (United Kingdom) Alex Sedgwick	(United States) Dollahite Racing							26†	0
Pos.	Driver	Team	SON	AUS	SEB	ATL	ELK	BAR	IND	Points

==== Am ====
Pos.	Driver	Team	SON	AUS	SEB	ATL	ELK	BAR	IND	Points
1	(United States) Jay Schreibman	(Italy) AF Corse USA	16^{PF}	15^{PF}	16^{PF}	14^{PF}	16†^{P}	16^{PF}	18	193
2	(Brazil) Oswaldo Negri Jr.	(Italy) AF Corse USA	16^{PF}	15^{PF}	16^{PF}			16^{PF}	18	150
3	(Denmark) Benny Simonsen	(Italy) AF Corse USA				14^{PF}	16†^{P}		18	93
4	(United States) Mitchell Green	(United States) Scuderia Corsa					9^{F}		21^{F}	61
5	(United States) Jon Morley	(United States) Scuderia Corsa					9^{F}			25
6	(United States) Marc Austin	(United States) MAD Joker by Lone Star Racing		16					17^{P}	18
7	(United States) Jason Golan	(United States) MAD Joker by Lone Star Racing		16						18
Drivers ineligible to score points
–	(Republic of Ireland) Peter Dempsey (United States) Ben Keating	(United States) MAD Joker by Lone Star Racing							17^{P}	0
–	(United States) Conrad Grunewald (United Kingdom) Jamie Morrow	(United States) Scuderia Corsa							21^{F}	0
Pos.	Driver	Team	SON	AUS	SEB	ATL	ELK	BAR	IND	Points

==== SRO GT Academy ====
Rather than on race results, points are awarded largely on the basis of single-driver performance, average pace and fastest laps. The winner of the class will compete in the 2027 24 Hours of Spa.

Pos.	Driver	Team	Points
1	(New Zealand) Ryan Yardley	(United States) Wright Motorsports	95
2	(Canada) Zachary Vanier	(United States) McCann Racing	86
3	(Sweden) Hampus Ericsson	(United States) Random Vandals Racing	44
4	(United States) Riley Dickinson	(United States) Kellymoss	41
5	(Argentina) Matías Pérez Companc	(Italy) AF Corse USA	37
6	(United States) Justin Rothberg	(United States) Turner Motorsport	25
Entered but ineligible for the award after not completing the full season
–	(Australia) Tom Sargent	(United States) GMG Racing	156
–	(United Kingdom) Alex Sedgwick	(United States) Dollahite Racing	57
–	(United Kingdom) Lorcan Hanafin	(Canada) JMF Motorsports	56

=== Manufacturers' championship ===
Pos.	Manufacturer	SON	AUS	SEB	ATL	ELK	BAR	IND	Points
1	Porsche	3^{F}	1^{F}	4^{F}	4^{F}	4	4	1^{F}	141
2	Mercedes-AMG	1^{P}	2^{P}	7^{P}	1	2	2	5	134
3	BMW M	6	4	1	9	1^{F}	6	3	125
4	Ferrari	2	9	3	2^{P}	8^{P}	1^{PF}	4	124
5	McLaren	15	18	20†	3	14	3	2	92
6	Ford	5	20	2	17†	11		26†^{P}	60
7	Aston Martin		17	17	13	21†	14	24†	50
8	Lamorghini	12				13		16	32
9	Corvette	DNS	DNS	WD		DNS		WD	0
Pos.	Manufacturer	SON	AUS	SEB	ATL	ELK	BAR	IND	Points

=== Teams' championship ===
Pos.	Team	Manufacturer	SON	AUS	SEB	ATL	ELK	BAR	IND	Points
Pro class
1	(United States) Turner Motorsport	BMW M	6^{F}	4	1	16†	1^{F}	6	3^{P}	154
2	(Canada) JMF Motorsports	Mercedes-AMG	1^{P}	2^{P}^{F}	18†^{P}	6	2	2	5	144
3	(Italy) AF Corse USA	Ferrari	2	19	3^{F}	2^{PF}	17†^{P}	1^{PF}	4^{F}	141
4	(United States) McCann Racing	Porsche	13	8	4	8	12	5	11	103
5	(United States) Dollahite Racing	Ford	5	20	2	17†	11			68
Teams ineligible to score points
–	(United States) Wright Motorsports	Porsche							9	0
–	(United States) Mercedes-AMG Team Lone Star Racing	Mercedes-AMG							27†	0
Pro-Am class
1	(United States) GMG Racing	Porsche	3^{F}	6^{F}	5^{F}	4^{F}	19†	7	1^{PF}	145
2	(United States) Wright Motorsports	Porsche	4	1	8	7	5	11	6	116
3	(United States) RS1	Porsche	7	5	6	18†	4	4^{P}	7	113
4	(United States) Archangel Motorsports	McLaren	15	18	20†	3^{P}	14	3^{F}	2	88
5	(Canada) JMF Motorsports	Mercedes-AMG	14^{P}	21†^{P}	7	1	7	8	25†	70
6	(United States) Kellymoss	Porsche	8	10	13	5	18†	10	12	65
7	(United States) TR3 Racing	Mercedes-AMG	17	13	10	10	3	17†	15	53
8	(United States) Riley Technologies	BMW M	18†	7	11	9	15†	13	14	45
9	(United States) Random Vandals Racing	BMW M	11	12	19†	19†	10	15	13	43
10	(United States) Triarsi Competizione	Ferrari		9	9^{P}		8^{P}			30
11	(United States) Chicago Performance and Tuning Co	Lamborghini	12				13^{F}		16	18
12	(United States) Rebel Rock Racing	Aston Martin		17	17	13	21†	14	24†	12
13	(United States) HP-Tech Motorsport	Ferrari					22†	9		10
14	(United States) Chouest Povoledo Racing	Chevrolet	DNS	DNS	WD		DNS		WD	0
Teams ineligible to score points
–	(Germany) Herberth Motorsport	Porsche							8	0
–	(Denmark) High Class Racing	Porsche							10	0
–	(San Marino) Tsunami RT	Porsche							19	0
–	(Germany) GetSpeed Team PCX	Mercedes-AMG							20	0
–	(United States) Dollahite Racing	Ford							26†	0
Am class
1	(Italy) AF Corse USA	Ferrari	16^{PF}	15^{PF}	16^{PF}	14^{PF}	16†^{P}	16^{PF}	18	179
2	(United States) MAD Joker by Lone Star Racing	Mercedes-AMG		16					17^{P}	68
3	(United States) Scuderia Corsa	Ferrari					9^{F}		21^{F}	55
Pos.	Team	Manufacturer	SON	AUS	SEB	ATL	ELK	BAR	IND	Points

Key
Colour	Result
Gold	Race winner
Silver	2nd place
Bronze	3rd place
Green	Points finish
Blue	Non-points finish
Blue	Non-classified finish (NC)
Purple	Did not finish (Ret)
Black	Disqualified (DSQ)
Black	Excluded (EX)
White	Did not start (DNS)
White	Race cancelled (C)
White	Withdrew (WD)
Blank	Did not participate

^{P} – Pole
^{F} – Fastest lap

Notes

- † – Teams did not finish the race but were classified, as they had started the race.

== See also ==
- 2026 GT World Challenge Europe
- 2026 GT World Challenge Europe Endurance Cup
- 2026 GT World Challenge Europe Sprint Cup
- 2026 GT World Challenge Asia
- 2026 GT World Challenge Australia
- 2026 Intercontinental GT Challenge
