= Porsche Sprint Challenge North America =

US and Canada sports car racing series

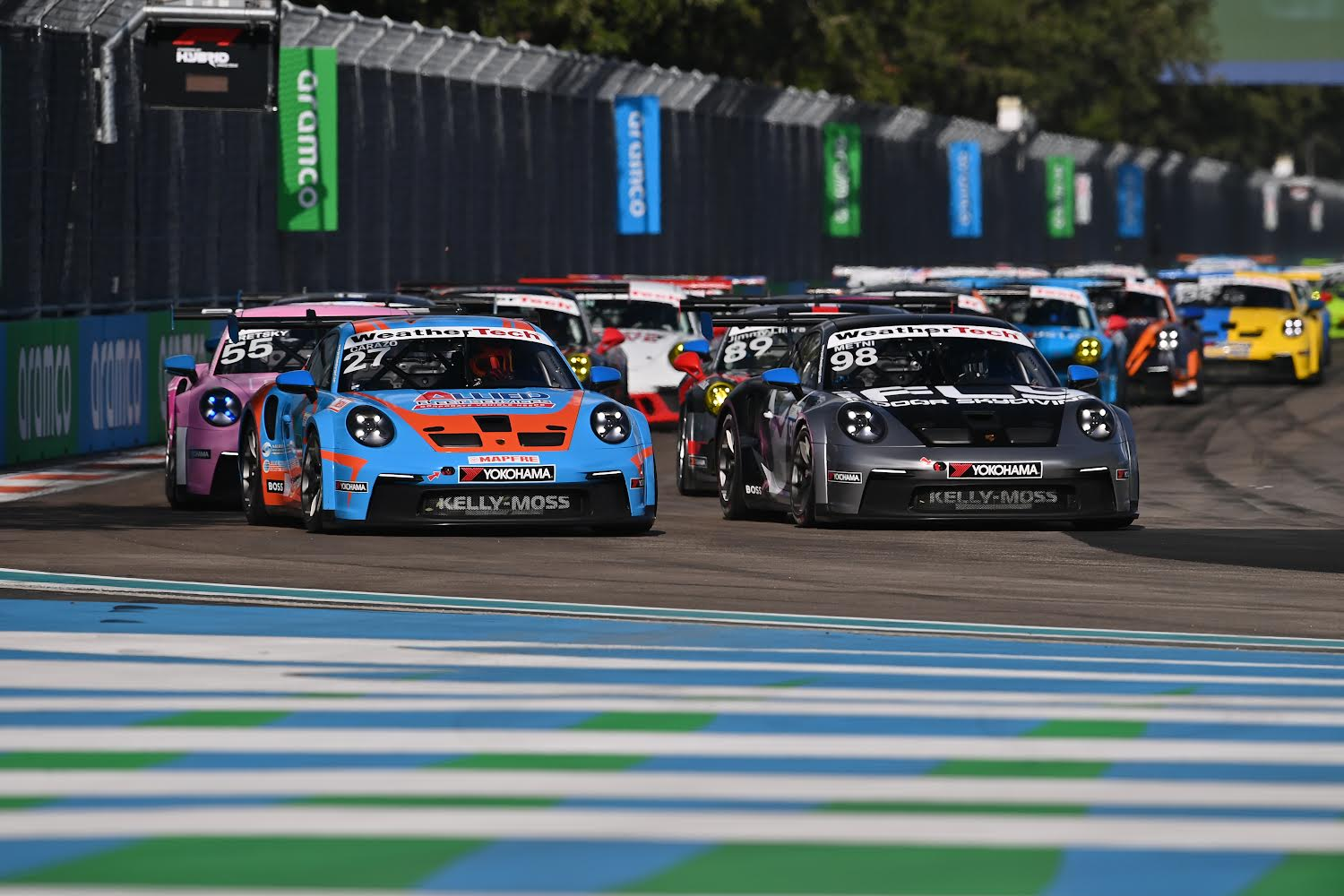
- Porsche Carrera Cup North America cars racing at the Miami International Autodrome
- Category: GT Racing; One-make racing
- Country: North America
- Inaugural season: 2021
- Constructors: Porsche
- Tyre suppliers: Yokohama
- Official website: Porsche Sprint Challenge North America

The Porsche Sprint Challenge North America by Yokohama is a sports car racing series organized by German car manufacturer Porsche and sanctioned by USAC, with races in the United States and Canada. Porsche Motorsports North America (PMNA) intends this series as the step between club racing and the Carrera Cup North America as part of a hierarchy that includes the global Porsche Supercup.

The Porsche Sprint Challenge North America features semi-professional drivers racing in matched Porsches and is one of the largest single-make series in North America. Powered by the Porsche 911 GT3 Cup car, the multi-class structure of the series aims to develop drivers for a future career in the GT World Challenge or WeatherTech SportsCar Championship.

Porsche Sprint Challenge North America is the first one-make racing step on the Motorsport Pyramid, a tier below the premier single-brand Porsche Carrera Cup North America Presented by the Cayman Islands. With the goal of moving drivers, teams and marketing partners from club level racing to a more professional and competitive environment, it is a part of Porsche Motorsport.

There are three classes: the 992 class uses the Porsche 911 GT3 Cup 992, the 991 class uses the Porsche 911 GT3 991.2, and the Cayman class which uses the Porsche 718 Cayman GT4 Clubsport.

Due to the success of the North American series in 2021, Porsche Motorsport North America (PMNA) and the United States Auto Club (USAC) announced the formation of the Porsche Sprint Challenge USA West, a six-weekend season developed to provide race teams in the western United States and Canada a more geographically favorable travel schedule.

== Champions ==
Season	GT3 Cup 992		GT3 Cup 991	Cayman	
2021	(United States) Michael McCarthy		(United States) Grant Talkie	(Colombia) Juan Martinez	
2022	(Puerto Rico) Sebastian Carazo		(Dominican Republic) Jimmy Llibre	(United States) Aidan Kenny	
Season	992 Pro-Am	992 Am	991	Cayman Pro-Am	Cayman Am
2023	(Canada) Zachary Vanier	(United States) David Williams	(United States) Ashley Freiberg	(United States) Paul Bocuse	(United States) Jason Golan
Season	992 Pro-Am	992 Masters	991	Cayman Pro-Am	Cayman Masters
2024	(United States) Jared Thomas	(United States) Scott Blind	(Germany) Niels Messiner	(United States) Ian Porter	(United States) Michael Clark
Season	GT3 Cup Pro-Am	GT3 Cup Masters		Cayman Pro-Am	Cayman Masters
2025	(United States) Cole Kleck	(United States) Scott Blind		(Belgium) Jens Hantson	(Canada) Alain Scalzo
2026	(Belgium) Karel Staut	(United States) Mark Boden		(United States) Anna Cecchi	(United States) Bill Peluchiwski
