= Orey Fidani =

Canadian racing driver (born 1986)

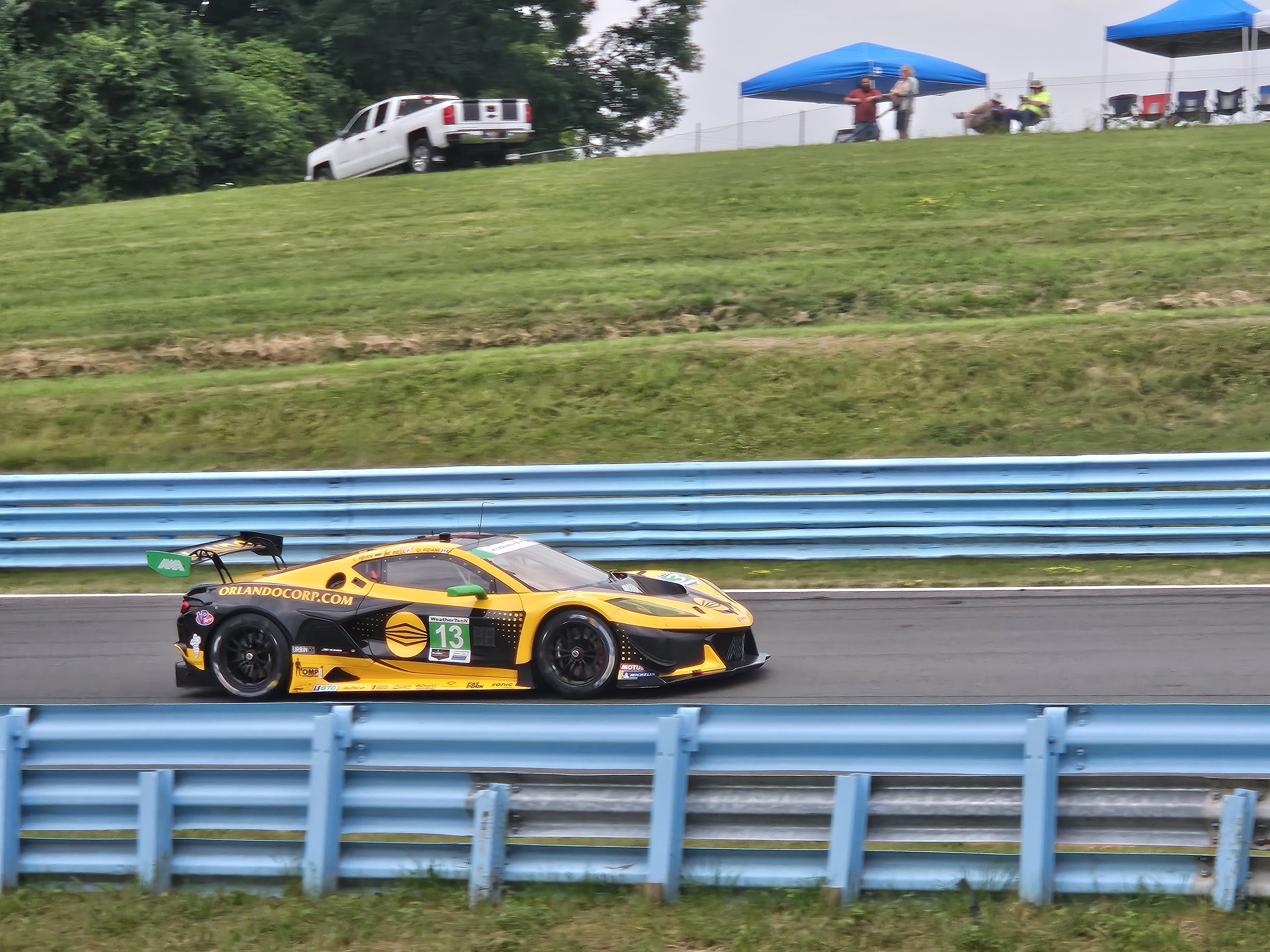
- Nationality: (Canada) Canadian
- Born: 21 November 1986 (age 39) Caledon, Ontario, Canada

IMSA SportsCar Championship career
- Debut season: 2022
- Current team: AWA
- Categorisation: FIA Silver (until 2021); FIA Bronze (2022–)
- Car number: 13
- Starts: 25
- Wins: 1
- Podiums: 6
- Poles: 0
- Fastest laps: 2
- Best finish: 3rd in 2023

Previous series
- 2022 2019–21 2020 2018 2015–17 2015–17: IMSA Prototype Challenge; Michelin Pilot Challenge; Canadian Touring Car Championship; Pirelli World Challenge; Porsche GT3 Cup Challenge; Porsche GT3 Cup Challenge Canada

Championship titles
- 2020 2015: Canadian Touring Car Championship - GT Sport; Porsche GT3 Cup Challenge Canada - Gold

Awards
- 2024, 2025: Bob Akin Award

Orey Fidani (born 21 November 1986) is a Canadian racing driver. He currently competes in the 2025 IMSA SportsCar Championship driving the No. 13 AWA Chevrolet Corvette Z06 GT3.R. Fidani is the GTD class winner of the 2025 24 Hours of Daytona.

== Career ==
=== Porsche GT3 Cup Challenge Canada ===
==== 2015 ====
In 2015, Fidani competed in the Gold class of the Porsche GT3 Cup Challenge Canada driving for Pfaff Motorsports. He finished on the podium in eight out of the ten races to take the Gold class title.

==== 2017 ====
Fidani would return to the series for a third year, once again in the Gold class with Pfaff Motorsports. He would finish second in the championship with four podiums in four races.

=== Canadian Touring Car Championship ===
==== 2020 ====
Due to the COVID-19 pandemic, Fidani and his team AWA would switch away from the 2020 Michelin Pilot Challenge to compete in the 2020 Canadian Touring Car Championship. Fidani had a dominant season, claiming pole in all six races and then winning all six races in the championship.

=== Michelin Pilot Challenge ===
==== 2019 ====
In 2019, Fidani would move to the Michelin Pilot Challenge to drive for the No. 13 AWA Porsche 718 Cayman GT4 Clubsport alongside Scott Hargrove. At the sixth round in Lime Rock Park, Hargrove was replaced with Chris Green and AWA switched to a McLaren 570S GT4. Fidani scored a best finish of fifth at the final race in Road Atlanta with Green.

==== 2020 ====
Fidani returned to the championship in 2020, driving the No. 13 AWA McLaren 570S GT4. Alongside him was veteran Kuno Wittmer. Fidani would qualify on pole at the opening race at Daytona, but would ultimately come home in 26th. Due to the COVID-19 pandemic, AWA would have to shut down operations indefinitely. There were hopes of competing later in the year, however, that never came into fruition.

==== 2021 ====
Following his championship in the 2020 Canadian Touring Car Championship, Fidani returned to the Michelin Pilot Challenge in 2021 with AWA. He joined Kuno Wittmer once again to drive the No. 13 AWA McLaren 570S GT4. In the season opener at Daytona, Fidani qualified on pole and would go on to win his first race in the series. Fidani had to miss the third race at Mid-Ohio as he awaited the arrival of his newborn son.

=== IMSA SportsCar Championship ===
==== 2022 ====
In 2022, Fidani and AWA moved up to the top level of the North American Sports Car racing ladder to compete in the 2022 IMSA SportsCar Championship. He would compete in the LMP3 class driving the No. 13 AWA Duqueine M30 - D-08 alongside Matt Bell, Lars Kern, and Kuno Wittmer. Fidani's best result was a second place at Road America. He finished sixth in the LMP3 driver's championship.

==== 2023 ====
Fidani returned with AWA for the 2023 IMSA SportsCar Championship, once again in the LMP3 class. He would drive the No. 13 AWA Duqueine M30 - D-08 alongside Matt Bell, Lars Kern, and Moritz Kranz. Fidani would have a successful season with three podiums to finish third in the LMP3 driver's championship.

==== 2024 ====
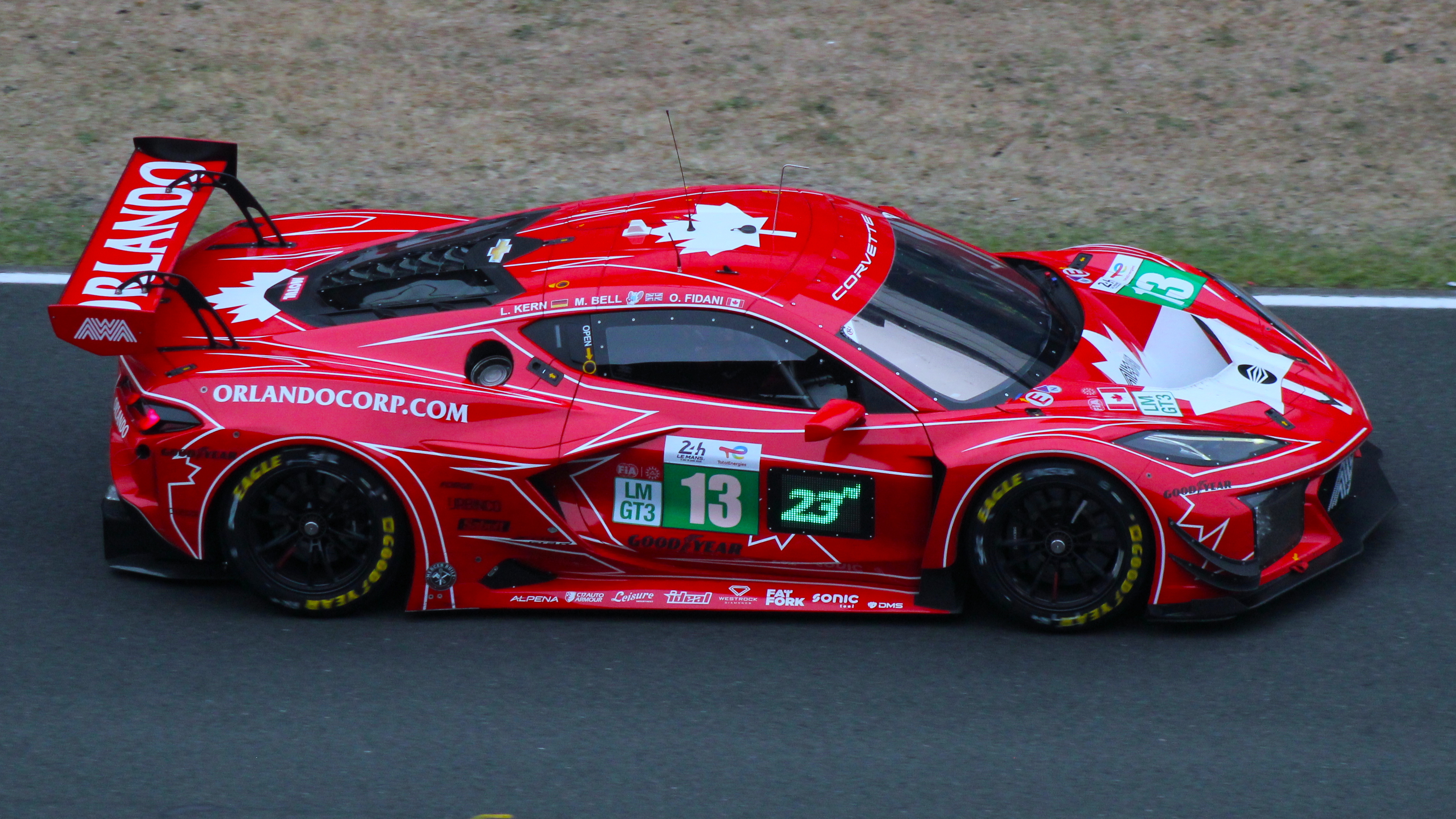
Fidani at the 2025 24 Hours of Le Mans

Fidani would return for a third season to compete in the 2024 IMSA SportsCar Championship driving for AWA. Since LMP3 would no longer be present in the championship going forward, AWA switched to the GTD class to field two Chevrolet Corvette Z06 GT3.Rs. Fidani would drive the No. 13 alongside Matt Bell, Lars Kern, and Alex Lynn. Fidani won the Bob Akin award that season, given to the highest-finishing FIA Bronze-rated driver in the GTD championship, earning him an invite to the 2025 24 Hours of Le Mans.

== Racing record ==
=== Career summary ===
Season	Series	Team	Races	Wins	Poles	F/Laps	Podiums	Points	Position
2015	Porsche GT3 Cup Challenge Canada - Gold	Pfaff Motorsports	10	0	2	1	8	170	**1st**
2015	Porsche GT3 Cup Challenge - Gold	Pfaff Motorsports	2	0	0	0	1	028	12th
2016	Porsche GT3 Cup Challenge - Platinum	Pfaff Motorsports	2	0	0	0	0	0	27th
2016	Porsche GT3 Cup Challenge Canada - Platinum	Pfaff Motorsports	11	0	0	0	0	95	7th
2017	Porsche GT3 Cup Challenge - Gold	Pfaff Motorsports	2	0	0	0	0	11	15th
2017	Porsche GT3 Cup Challenge Canada - Gold	Pfaff Motorsports	4	0	0	0	4	90	**2nd**
2017	Porsche GT3 Cup Challenge Canada - Platinum	Pfaff Motorsports	2	0	0	0	0	7	16th
2018	Pirelli World Challenge - GTS Sprint	Pfaff Motorsports	8	0	0	0	0	49	16th
2018	SprintX GT Championship Series - GTS	Pfaff Motorsports	10	0	0	0	0	75	11th
2018	Pirelli World Challenge - GTSA	Pfaff Motorsports	8	0	0	0	0	104	8th
2019	Michelin Pilot Challenge - GS	AWA	9	0	0	0	0	138	17th
2020	Michelin Pilot Challenge - GS	AWA	1	0	0	0	0	5	69th
2020	Canadian Touring Car Championship - GT Sport	AWA	6	6	6	6	6	903	**1st**
2021	Michelin Pilot Challenge - GS	AWA	9	1	0	0	1	2240	6th
2022	IMSA Prototype Challenge	AWA	1	0	0	0	0	180	36th
2022	IMSA SportsCar Championship - LMP3	AWA	8	0	0	0	2	1716	6th
2023	IMSA SportsCar Championship - LMP3	AWA	7	0	0	0	3	1882	**3rd**
2024	IMSA SportsCar Championship - GTD	AWA	10	0	0	1	0	2288	10th
2024	Le Mans Cup - GT3	Kessel Racing							
2025	IMSA SportsCar Championship - GTD	AWA	10	1	0	1	1	2461	9th
2025	24 Hours of Le Mans - LMGT3	AWA	1	0	0	0	0	N/A	10th
2026	IMSA SportsCar Championship - GTD	13 Autosport	10	0	0	1	1	2414	5th
2026	24 Hours of Le Mans - LMGT3	13 Autosport	1	0	0	0	0	N/A	DNF
2026	Nürburgring Langstrecken-Serie - SP10	Manthey Racing							
2026	Nürburgring Langstrecken-Serie - SP-Pro	Manthey Racing							

* Season still in progress.

=== Complete Canadian Touring Car Championship results ===
(key) (Races in bold indicate pole position) (Races in italics indicate fastest lap)

Year	Entrant	Class	Make	Engine	1	2	3	4	5	6	Rank	Points
2020	AWA	GT Sport	McLaren 570S GT4	McLaren 3.8 L Turbo V8	**MOS**; **1**; 1	**MOS**; **2**; 1	**SMP**; **1**; 1	**SMP**; **2**; 1	**CMP**; **1**; 1	**CMP**; **1**; 1	1st	903

=== Complete Michelin Pilot Challenge results ===
(key) (Races in bold indicate pole position) (Races in italics indicate fastest lap)

Year	Entrant	Class	Make	Engine	1	2	3	4	5	6	7	8	9	10	Rank	Points
2019	AWA	Grand Sport	Porsche 718 Cayman GT4 Clubsport McLaren 570S GT4	Porsche 2.8 L Flat-6 McLaren 3.8 L Turbo V8	DAY; 28	SEB; 1; 18	MOH; 17	WGL; 23	MOS; 11	LIM; 16	ELK; 10	VIR; 25	LGA; 19	ATL; 5	15th	138
2020	AWA	Grand Sport	McLaren 570S GT4	McLaren 3.8 L Turbo V8	**DAY**; 26	SEB; 1	ELK	VIR	ATL; 1	MOH; 1	MOH; 2	ATL; 2	LGA	SEB; 2	32nd	5
2021	AWA	Grand Sport	McLaren 570S GT4	McLaren 3.8 L Turbo V8	**DAY**; 1	SEB; 9	MOH	**WGL**; **1**; 14	WGL; 2; 15	LIM; 17	ELK; 12	LGA; 19	VIR; 7	ATL; 3	11th	1890

=== Complete IMSA SportsCar Championship results ===
(key) (Races in bold indicate pole position) (Races in italics indicate fastest lap)

Year	Entrant	Class	Chassis	Engine	1	2	3	4	5	6	7	8	9	10	11	Pos.	Pts
2022	AWA	LMP3	Duqueine M30 - D-08	Nissan VK56 V8 5.6L	DAY; 5	SEB; 4			MOH; 8			WGL; 9	MOS; 4	ELK; 2	ATL; 7	6th	1716
2023	AWA	LMP3	Duqueine M30 - D-08	Nissan VK56 V8 5.6L	DAY; 4	SEB; 2			WGL; 5	MOS; 4		ELK; 3		IMS; 5	ATL; 2	3rd	1882
2024	AWA	GTD	Chevrolet Corvette Z06 GT3.R	Chevrolet LT6 5.5 L V8	DAY; 21	SEB; 9	LBH; 6	LGA; 11		WGL; 7	MOS; 13	ELK; 5	VIR; 6	IMS; 6	ATL; 11	10th	2288
2025	AWA	GTD	Chevrolet Corvette Z06 GT3.R	Chevrolet LT6 5.5 L V8	DAY; 1	SEB; 10	LBH; 13	LGA; 13		WGL; 9	MOS; 9	ELK; 7	VIR; 8	IMS; 6	ATL; 9	9th	2461
2026	13 Autosport	GTD	Chevrolet Corvette Z06 GT3.R	Chevrolet LT6 5.5 L V8	DAY; 4	SEB; 6	LBH; 12	LGA; 12		WGL; 13	MOS; 12	ELK; 7	VIR; 6	IMS; 3	PET; 10	5th	2414

* Season still in progress.

==== 24 Hours of Daytona results ====
Year	Class	No	Team	Car	Co-drivers	Laps	Position	Class Pos.
2022	LMP3	13	(Canada) AWA	Duqueine M30 - D-08	(United Kingdom) Matt Bell (Germany) Lars Kern (Canada) Kuno Wittmer	695	32	5
2023	LMP3	13	(Canada) AWA	Duqueine M30 - D-08	(United Kingdom) Matt Bell (Germany) Lars Kern (Germany) Moritz Kranz	717	35	4
2024	GTD	13	(Canada) AWA	Chevrolet Corvette Z06 GT3.R	(United Kingdom) Matt Bell (Germany) Lars Kern (United Kingdom) Alex Lynn	308	51 ^{DNF}	21 ^{DNF}
2025	GTD	13	(Canada) AWA	Chevrolet Corvette Z06 GT3.R	(United Kingdom) Matt Bell (Germany) Lars Kern (Germany) Marvin Kirchhöfer	719	21	**1**

=== Complete 24 Hours of Le Mans results ===
Year	Team	Co-Drivers	Car	Class	Laps	Pos.	Class Pos.
2025	(Canada) AWA Racing	(United Kingdom) Matt Bell (Germany) Lars Kern	Chevrolet Corvette Z06 GT3.R	LMGT3	338	42nd	10th
2026	(Canada) 13 Autosport	(United Kingdom) Matt Bell (Germany) Lars Kern	Chevrolet Corvette Z06 GT3.R	LMGT3	61	DNF	DNF
