= 2019 Michelin Pilot Challenge =

Motor racing competition

The 2019 Michelin Pilot Challenge is the twentieth season of the IMSA SportsCar Challenge and the sixth season organized by the International Motor Sports Association (IMSA). Michelin is set to become the new official tire supplier of the series, following the departure of Continental Tire at the end of 2018.

== Classes ==
- Grand Sport (GS) (run to FIA GT4 regulations)
- Touring Car (TCR)

The Street Tuner (ST) class will not return to the renamed series after the 2018 season.

== Rule Changes ==
- It was announced during the 2018 Petit Le Mans livestream that floor-mounted shifting would be dropped for the 2019 season.

== Series News ==
- Multimatic will be using IMSA GTO tribute liveries in commemoration of IMSA's 50th anniversary.

== Schedule ==
=== Race Schedule ===
The 2019 schedule was released on 3 August 2018 and features twelve rounds.

Rnd	Race	Circuit	Location	Date	Duration
1	BMW Endurance Challenge at Daytona	(United States) Daytona International Speedway	Daytona Beach, Florida	January 25	4 Hours
2	Alan Jay Automotive Network 120	(United States) Sebring International Raceway	Sebring, Florida	March 15	2 Hours
3	Mid-Ohio 120	(United States) Mid-Ohio Sports Car Course	Lexington, Ohio	May 4	2 Hours
4	Tioga Downs Casino Resort 240 at The Glen	(United States) Watkins Glen International	Watkins Glen, New York	June 29	4 Hours
5	Canadian Tire Motorsport Park 120	(Canada) Canadian Tire Motorsport Park	Bowmanville, Ontario	July 6	2 Hours
6	Lime Rock Park 120	(United States) Lime Rock Park	Lakeville, Connecticut	July 20	2 Hours
7	Road America 120	(United States) Road America	Elkhart Lake, Wisconsin	August 3	2 Hours
8	Virginia Is For Racing Lovers Grand Prix	(United States) Virginia International Raceway	Alton, Virginia	August 24	2 Hours
9	WeatherTech Raceway Laguna Seca 120	(United States) WeatherTech Raceway Laguna Seca	Monterey, California	September 14	2 Hours
10	Fox Factory 120	(United States) Michelin Raceway Road Atlanta	Braselton, Georgia	October 11	2 Hours

== Entry list ==
=== Grand Sport ===
Team	Car	Engine	No.	Drivers	Rounds
(United States) Automatic Racing AMR	Aston Martin V8 Vantage GT4	Aston Martin 4.7 L V8	09	(United States) Dale Katechis	1
(United States) Automatic Racing AMR	Aston Martin V8 Vantage GT4	Aston Martin 4.7 L V8	09	(United States) Mikel Miller	1
(United States) Automatic Racing AMR	Aston Martin V8 Vantage GT4	Aston Martin 4.7 L V8	09	(United States) Kris Wilson	5
(United States) Automatic Racing AMR	Aston Martin V8 Vantage GT4	Aston Martin 4.7 L V8	09	(United States) Gary Ferrera	5
(United States) Automatic Racing AMR	Aston Martin AMR Vantage GT4	Aston Martin 4.0 L Turbo V8	09	(United States) Ari Balogh	6
(United States) Automatic Racing AMR	Aston Martin AMR Vantage GT4	Aston Martin 4.0 L Turbo V8	09	(United States) Greg Liefooghe	6
(United States) Automatic Racing AMR	Aston Martin AMR Vantage GT4	Aston Martin 4.0 L Turbo V8	09	(India) Akhil Rabindra	7–10
(United States) Automatic Racing AMR	Aston Martin AMR Vantage GT4	Aston Martin 4.0 L Turbo V8	09	(United States) Kris Wilson	7
(United States) Automatic Racing AMR	Aston Martin AMR Vantage GT4	Aston Martin 4.0 L Turbo V8	09	(United Kingdom) Ross Gunn	8
(United States) Automatic Racing AMR	Aston Martin AMR Vantage GT4	Aston Martin 4.0 L Turbo V8	09	(United States) Rob Ecklin Jr.	9
(United States) Automatic Racing AMR	Aston Martin AMR Vantage GT4	Aston Martin 4.0 L Turbo V8	09	(United States) Tom Long	10
(United States) Automatic Racing AMR	Aston Martin AMR Vantage GT4	Aston Martin 4.0 L Turbo V8	97	(United States) Ramin Abdolvahabi	1–2, 4, 7–8
(United States) Automatic Racing AMR	Aston Martin AMR Vantage GT4	Aston Martin 4.0 L Turbo V8	97	(United States) Rob Ecklin Jr.	1–4, 6–7
(United States) Automatic Racing AMR	Aston Martin AMR Vantage GT4	Aston Martin 4.0 L Turbo V8	97	(United States) Brandon Kidd	1, 3–4
(United States) Automatic Racing AMR	Aston Martin AMR Vantage GT4	Aston Martin 4.0 L Turbo V8	97	(United States) Ari Balogh	5
(United States) Automatic Racing AMR	Aston Martin AMR Vantage GT4	Aston Martin 4.0 L Turbo V8	97	(United States) Greg Liefooghe	5
(United States) Automatic Racing AMR	Aston Martin AMR Vantage GT4	Aston Martin 4.0 L Turbo V8	97	(United States) Tom Long	6, 8
(United States) Automatic Racing AMR	Aston Martin AMR Vantage GT4	Aston Martin 4.0 L Turbo V8	97	(United States) Kris Wilson	9–10
(United States) Automatic Racing AMR	Aston Martin AMR Vantage GT4	Aston Martin 4.0 L Turbo V8	97	(United States) Gary Ferrera	9–10
(United States) Automatic Racing AMR	Aston Martin V8 Vantage GT4	Aston Martin 4.7 L V8	99	(United States) Kris Wilson	1, 6
(United States) Automatic Racing AMR	Aston Martin V8 Vantage GT4	Aston Martin 4.7 L V8	99	(United States) Gary Ferrera	1, 6
(United States) Automatic Racing AMR	Aston Martin V8 Vantage GT4	Aston Martin 4.7 L V8	99	(United States) Ramin Abdolvahabi	10
(United States) Automatic Racing AMR	Aston Martin V8 Vantage GT4	Aston Martin 4.7 L V8	99	(United States) Benjamin Waddell	10
(United States) eEuroparts.com ROWE Racing	Audi R8 LMS GT4	Audi 5.2 L V10	2	(United States) Tyler Cooke	1–8
(United States) eEuroparts.com ROWE Racing	Audi R8 LMS GT4	Audi 5.2 L V10	2	(United States) Kenton Koch	1–8
(United States) eEuroparts.com ROWE Racing	Audi R8 LMS GT4	Audi 5.2 L V10	8	(United States) Gunnar Jeannette	1–4, 8
(United States) eEuroparts.com ROWE Racing	Audi R8 LMS GT4	Audi 5.2 L V10	8	(United States) Rodrigo Sales	1–4, 8
(United States) eEuroparts.com ROWE Racing	Audi R8 LMS GT4	Audi 5.2 L V10	8	(United States) Benjamin Albano	5
(United States) eEuroparts.com ROWE Racing	Audi R8 LMS GT4	Audi 5.2 L V10	8	(United States) Lee Carpentier	5
(United States) Team TGM	Mercedes-AMG GT4	Mercedes-AMG M178 4.0 L V8	4	(United States) Guy Cosmo	All
(United States) Team TGM	Mercedes-AMG GT4	Mercedes-AMG M178 4.0 L V8	4	(United States) Ted Giovanis	All
(United States) Team TGM	Mercedes-AMG GT4	Mercedes-AMG M178 4.0 L V8	46	(United States) Hugh Plumb	All
(United States) Team TGM	Mercedes-AMG GT4	Mercedes-AMG M178 4.0 L V8	46	(United States) Owen Trinkler	All
(Canada) Atlantic Racing Team	Mercedes-AMG GT4	Mercedes-AMG M178 4.0 L V8	6	(Canada) Phil Holtrust	5
(Canada) Atlantic Racing Team	Mercedes-AMG GT4	Mercedes-AMG M178 4.0 L V8	6	(Canada) Danny Kok	5
(United States) Park Place Motorsports with VOLT Lightning	Porsche 718 Cayman GT4 Clubsport	Porsche 3.8 L Flat-6	7	(United States) Alan Brynjolfsson	All
(United States) Park Place Motorsports with VOLT Lightning	Porsche 718 Cayman GT4 Clubsport	Porsche 3.8 L Flat-6	7	(United States) Trent Hindman	All
(United States) BGB Motorsports	Porsche 718 Cayman GT4 Clubsport	Porsche 3.8 L Flat-6	11	(Canada) Thomas Colingwood	1–2, 4
(United States) BGB Motorsports	Porsche 718 Cayman GT4 Clubsport	Porsche 3.8 L Flat-6	11	(United States) John Teece	1–2, 4
(United States) BGB Motorsports	Porsche 718 Cayman GT4 Clubsport	Porsche 3.8 L Flat-6	11	(Canada) Stefan Rzadzinski	1
(United States) BGB Motorsports	Porsche 718 Cayman GT4 Clubsport	Porsche 3.8 L Flat-6	11	(United States) Spencer Pumpelly	4
(Canada) AWA	Porsche 718 Cayman GT4 Clubsport; McLaren 570S GT4	Porsche 3.8 L Flat-6; McLaren 3.8 L Turbo V8	13	(Canada) Orey Findani	All
(Canada) AWA	Porsche 718 Cayman GT4 Clubsport; McLaren 570S GT4	Porsche 3.8 L Flat-6; McLaren 3.8 L Turbo V8	13	(Canada) Scott Hargrove	1–6
(Canada) AWA	Porsche 718 Cayman GT4 Clubsport; McLaren 570S GT4	Porsche 3.8 L Flat-6; McLaren 3.8 L Turbo V8	13	(Canada) Chris Green	7–10
(Canada) Multimatic Motorsports	Ford Mustang GT4	Ford 5.2 L Voodoo V8	15	(United States) Cole Custer	1
(Canada) Multimatic Motorsports	Ford Mustang GT4	Ford 5.2 L Voodoo V8	15	(Canada) Scott Maxwell	1
(Canada) Multimatic Motorsports	Ford Mustang GT4	Ford 5.2 L Voodoo V8	15	(United States) Ty Majeski	1
(Canada) Multimatic Motorsports	Ford Mustang GT4	Ford 5.2 L Voodoo V8	15	(United States) Ben Rhodes	2, 5
(Canada) Multimatic Motorsports	Ford Mustang GT4	Ford 5.2 L Voodoo V8	15	(United States) Myatt Snider	2
(Canada) Multimatic Motorsports	Ford Mustang GT4	Ford 5.2 L Voodoo V8	15	(United States) Grant Enfinger	5
(Canada) Multimatic Motorsports	Ford Mustang GT4	Ford 5.2 L Voodoo V8	15	(United States) Austin Cindric	10
(Canada) Multimatic Motorsports	Ford Mustang GT4	Ford 5.2 L Voodoo V8	15	(United Kingdom) Sebastian Priaulx	10
(Canada) Multimatic Motorsports	Ford Mustang GT4	Ford 5.2 L Voodoo V8	22	(United States) Chase Briscoe	1, 10
(Canada) Multimatic Motorsports	Ford Mustang GT4	Ford 5.2 L Voodoo V8	22	(United States) Austin Cindric	1
(Canada) Multimatic Motorsports	Ford Mustang GT4	Ford 5.2 L Voodoo V8	22	(United States) Billy Johnson	1
(Canada) Multimatic Motorsports	Ford Mustang GT4	Ford 5.2 L Voodoo V8	22	(United States) Matt Crafton	2, 5
(Canada) Multimatic Motorsports	Ford Mustang GT4	Ford 5.2 L Voodoo V8	22	(United States) Grant Enfinger	2
(Canada) Multimatic Motorsports	Ford Mustang GT4	Ford 5.2 L Voodoo V8	22	(United States) Johnny Sauter	5
(Canada) Multimatic Motorsports	Ford Mustang GT4	Ford 5.2 L Voodoo V8	22	(United States) Cole Custer	10
(United States) Moorespeed	Audi R8 LMS GT4	Audi 5.2 L V10	18	(United States) Rob Ferriol	8–10
(United States) Moorespeed	Audi R8 LMS GT4	Audi 5.2 L V10	18	(United States) Spencer Pumpelly	8–10
(United States) Stephen Cameron Racing	BMW M4 GT4	BMW N55 3.0 L Twin-Turbo I6	19	(United States) Ari Balogh	10
(United States) Stephen Cameron Racing	BMW M4 GT4	BMW N55 3.0 L Twin-Turbo I6	19	(United States) Tom Dyer	10
(United States) Stephen Cameron Racing	BMW M4 GT4	BMW N55 3.0 L Twin-Turbo I6	88	(United States) Greg Liefooghe	1–4, 7–8, 10
(United States) Stephen Cameron Racing	BMW M4 GT4	BMW N55 3.0 L Twin-Turbo I6	88	(United States) Henry Schmitt	1–4, 7–8, 10
(United States) Ian Lacy Racing	Ford Mustang GT4	Ford 5.2 L Voodoo V8	24	(United States) Drew Staveley	1
(United States) Ian Lacy Racing	Ford Mustang GT4	Ford 5.2 L Voodoo V8	24	(United States) Frank Gannett II	1
(United States) Fast Track Racing/Classic BMW	BMW M4 GT4	BMW N55 3.0 L Twin-Turbo I6	26	(Canada) Jayson Clunie	1
(United States) Fast Track Racing/Classic BMW	BMW M4 GT4	BMW N55 3.0 L Twin-Turbo I6	26	(United States) Toby Grahovec	1
(United States) Fast Track Racing/Classic BMW	BMW M4 GT4	BMW N55 3.0 L Twin-Turbo I6	26	(United Kingdom) Kyle Reid	1
(United States) RS1	Porsche 718 Cayman GT4 Clubsport	Porsche 3.8 L Flat-6	28	(Belgium) Jan Heylen	1
(United States) RS1	Porsche 718 Cayman GT4 Clubsport	Porsche 3.8 L Flat-6	28	(United States) Charlie Luck	1
(United States) RS1	Porsche 718 Cayman GT4 Clubsport	Porsche 3.8 L Flat-6	28	(United States) Fred Poordad	1
(United States) Bodymotion Racing	Porsche 718 Cayman GT4 Clubsport	Porsche 3.8 L Flat-6	31	(United States) Marc Miller	1
(United States) Bodymotion Racing	Porsche 718 Cayman GT4 Clubsport	Porsche 3.8 L Flat-6	31	(United States) Pete McIntosh	1
(United States) Bodymotion Racing	Porsche 718 Cayman GT4 Clubsport	Porsche 3.8 L Flat-6	31	(United States) Patrick Liddy	1
(United States) Bodymotion Racing	Porsche 718 Cayman GT4 Clubsport	Porsche 3.8 L Flat-6	31	(United States) Jeff Courtney	3
(United States) Bodymotion Racing	Porsche 718 Cayman GT4 Clubsport	Porsche 3.8 L Flat-6	31	(Canada) Fred Roberts	3
(Germany) Winward Racing/HTP Motorsport	Mercedes-AMG GT4	Mercedes-AMG M178 4.0 L V8	33	(United States) Russell Ward	1–6, 8–10
(Germany) Winward Racing/HTP Motorsport	Mercedes-AMG GT4	Mercedes-AMG M178 4.0 L V8	33	(Netherlands) Indy Dontje	1–6, 8, 10
(Germany) Winward Racing/HTP Motorsport	Mercedes-AMG GT4	Mercedes-AMG M178 4.0 L V8	33	(Austria) Dominik Baumann	9
(Germany) Winward Racing/HTP Motorsport	Mercedes-AMG GT4	Mercedes-AMG M178 4.0 L V8	57	(United States) Bryce Ward	All
(Germany) Winward Racing/HTP Motorsport	Mercedes-AMG GT4	Mercedes-AMG M178 4.0 L V8	57	(Germany) Christian Hohenadel	1–6, 8–10
(Germany) Winward Racing/HTP Motorsport	Mercedes-AMG GT4	Mercedes-AMG M178 4.0 L V8	57	(United States) Russell Ward	7
(United States) Wynn's - Riley Motorsports	Mercedes-AMG GT4	Mercedes-AMG M178 4.0 L V8	35	(United States) Jim Cox	All
(United States) Wynn's - Riley Motorsports	Mercedes-AMG GT4	Mercedes-AMG M178 4.0 L V8	35	(United States) Dylan Murry	All
(United States) Wynn's - Riley Motorsports	Mercedes-AMG GT4	Mercedes-AMG M178 4.0 L V8	35	(Netherlands) Jeroen Bleekemolen	1, 4
(United States) Carbahn Motorsports (United States) Carbahn with GMG Racing (Note: Car No. 93 will run as Carbahn with GMG Racing at Road America.)	Audi R8 LMS GT4	Audi 5.2 L V10	39	(United States) Tyler McQuarrie	All
(United States) Carbahn Motorsports (United States) Carbahn with GMG Racing	Audi R8 LMS GT4	Audi 5.2 L V10	39	(United States) Jeff Westphal	All
(United States) Carbahn Motorsports (United States) Carbahn with GMG Racing	Audi R8 LMS GT4	Audi 5.2 L V10	93	(United States) Tom Dyer	2, 4, 7–9
(United States) Carbahn Motorsports (United States) Carbahn with GMG Racing	Audi R8 LMS GT4	Audi 5.2 L V10	93	(United States) Mark Siegel	2, 4, 7–8
(United States) Carbahn Motorsports (United States) Carbahn with GMG Racing	Audi R8 LMS GT4	Audi 5.2 L V10	93	(United States) Sameer Gandhi	9
(United States) PF Racing	Ford Mustang GT4	Ford 5.2 L Voodoo V8	40	(United States) Jade Buford	All
(United States) PF Racing	Ford Mustang GT4	Ford 5.2 L Voodoo V8	40	(United States) James Pesek	All
(United States) PF Racing	Ford Mustang GT4	Ford 5.2 L Voodoo V8	40	(United States) Patrick Gallagher	1
(United States) PF Racing	Ford Mustang GT4	Ford 5.2 L Voodoo V8	41	(United States) Jeff Courtney	7
(United States) PF Racing	Ford Mustang GT4	Ford 5.2 L Voodoo V8	41	(Canada) Fred Roberts	7
(United States) NOLAsport	Porsche 718 Cayman GT4 Clubsport	Porsche 3.8 L Flat-6	44	(United States) Jason Hart	1–2
(United States) NOLAsport	Porsche 718 Cayman GT4 Clubsport	Porsche 3.8 L Flat-6	44	(United States) Mike Vess	1–2
(United States) NOLAsport	Porsche 718 Cayman GT4 Clubsport	Porsche 3.8 L Flat-6	44	(United States) Matthew Travis	1
(United States) Murillo Racing	Mercedes-AMG GT4	Mercedes-AMG M178 4.0 L V8	56	(United States) Eric Foss	All
(United States) Murillo Racing	Mercedes-AMG GT4	Mercedes-AMG M178 4.0 L V8	56	(United States) Jeff Mosing	All
(United States) Murillo Racing	Mercedes-AMG GT4	Mercedes-AMG M178 4.0 L V8	65	(United States) Justin Piscitell	1–2, 4–9
(United States) Murillo Racing	Mercedes-AMG GT4	Mercedes-AMG M178 4.0 L V8	65	(United States) Brent Mosing	1–4, 10
(United States) Murillo Racing	Mercedes-AMG GT4	Mercedes-AMG M178 4.0 L V8	65	(United States) Tim Probert	1, 3–5, 6–10
(United States) KohR Motorsports	Ford Mustang GT4	Ford 5.2 L Voodoo V8	58	(United States) DJ Randall	2
(United States) KohR Motorsports	Ford Mustang GT4	Ford 5.2 L Voodoo V8	58	(United States) Alec Udell	2
(United States) KohR Motorsports	Ford Mustang GT4	Ford 5.2 L Voodoo V8	59	(United States) Rod Randall	1–5
(United States) KohR Motorsports	Ford Mustang GT4	Ford 5.2 L Voodoo V8	59	(Canada) Kenny Wilden	1–5
(United States) KohR Motorsports	Ford Mustang GT4	Ford 5.2 L Voodoo V8	59	(United States) DJ Randall	1
(United States) KohR Motorsports	Ford Mustang GT4	Ford 5.2 L Voodoo V8	59	(United States) Billy Johnson	4
(United States) KohR Motorsports	Ford Mustang GT4	Ford 5.2 L Voodoo V8	59	(United States) Ari Balogh	9
(United States) KohR Motorsports	Ford Mustang GT4	Ford 5.2 L Voodoo V8	59	(United States) Greg Liefooghe	9
(United States) KohR Motorsports	Ford Mustang GT4	Ford 5.2 L Voodoo V8	60	(Canada) Kyle Marcelli	All
(United States) KohR Motorsports	Ford Mustang GT4	Ford 5.2 L Voodoo V8	60	(United States) Nate Stacy	All
(United States) TRG - The Racer's Group	Porsche 718 Cayman GT4 Clubsport	Porsche 3.8 L Flat-6	66	(United States) Dillon Machavern	1
(United States) TRG - The Racer's Group	Porsche 718 Cayman GT4 Clubsport	Porsche 3.8 L Flat-6	66	(United States) Spencer Pumpelly	1
(United States) TRG - The Racer's Group	Porsche 718 Cayman GT4 Clubsport	Porsche 3.8 L Flat-6	67	(United States) Chris Bellomo	1
(United States) TRG - The Racer's Group	Porsche 718 Cayman GT4 Clubsport	Porsche 3.8 L Flat-6	67	(United States) Robert Orcutt	1
(Canada) Motorsport in Action	McLaren 570S GT4	McLaren 3.8 L Turbo V8	69	(United States) Corey Fergus	All
(Canada) Motorsport in Action	McLaren 570S GT4	McLaren 3.8 L Turbo V8	69	(Canada) Jesse Lazare	All
(United States) Rebel Rock Racing	Chevrolet Camaro GT4.R	Chevrolet LT1 6.2 L V8	71	(United States) Robin Liddell	All
(United States) Rebel Rock Racing	Chevrolet Camaro GT4.R	Chevrolet LT1 6.2 L V8	71	(United Kingdom) Frank DePew	1–5, 7–10
(United States) Rebel Rock Racing	Chevrolet Camaro GT4.R	Chevrolet LT1 6.2 L V8	71	(United States) Andrew Davis	1, 4, 6
(Canada) Compass Racing	McLaren 570S GT4	McLaren 3.8 L Turbo V8	75	(Canada) Kuno Wittmer	All
(Canada) Compass Racing	McLaren 570S GT4	McLaren 3.8 L Turbo V8	75	(United States) Paul Holton	1–4, 7–10
(Canada) Compass Racing	McLaren 570S GT4	McLaren 3.8 L Turbo V8	75	(United Kingdom) Paul Rees	5–6
(United States) BimmerWorld Racing	BMW M4 GT4	BMW N55 3.0 L Twin-Turbo I6	80	(United States) Kaz Grala	1
(United States) BimmerWorld Racing	BMW M4 GT4	BMW N55 3.0 L Twin-Turbo I6	80	(United States) Aurora Straus	1
(United States) BimmerWorld Racing	BMW M4 GT4	BMW N55 3.0 L Twin-Turbo I6	80	(United States) Ari Balogh	7–8
(United States) BimmerWorld Racing	BMW M4 GT4	BMW N55 3.0 L Twin-Turbo I6	80	(United States) Seth Thomas	7
(United States) BimmerWorld Racing	BMW M4 GT4	BMW N55 3.0 L Twin-Turbo I6	80	(United States) Mike Skeen	8
(United States) BimmerWorld Racing	BMW M4 GT4	BMW N55 3.0 L Twin-Turbo I6	82	(United States) James Clay	All
(United States) BimmerWorld Racing	BMW M4 GT4	BMW N55 3.0 L Twin-Turbo I6	82	(United States) Devin Jones	All
(France) Ramsey Racing/EXR Team Prémat	Mercedes-AMG GT4	Mercedes-AMG M178 4.0 L V8	92	(United States) Mark Ramsey	9
(France) Ramsey Racing/EXR Team Prémat	Mercedes-AMG GT4	Mercedes-AMG M178 4.0 L V8	92	(France) Alexandre Prémat	9
(United States) Turner Motorsport	BMW M4 GT4	BMW N55 3.0 L Twin-Turbo I6	96	(United States) Robby Foley	1–4, 6, 8, 10
(United States) Turner Motorsport	BMW M4 GT4	BMW N55 3.0 L Twin-Turbo I6	96	(United States) Bruce McKee	1
(United States) Turner Motorsport	BMW M4 GT4	BMW N55 3.0 L Twin-Turbo I6	96	(United States) Sydney McKee	1
(United States) Turner Motorsport	BMW M4 GT4	BMW N55 3.0 L Twin-Turbo I6	96	(United States) Bill Auberlen	2–4, 6
(United States) Turner Motorsport	BMW M4 GT4	BMW N55 3.0 L Twin-Turbo I6	96	(United States) Vin Barletta	4, 8, 10

=== Touring Car ===
Team	Car	No.	Drivers	Rounds
(United States) / TMR Engineering and Consulting Inc. (Note: Car No. 3 entered as TMR Engineering and Consulting Inc. and car No. 5 entered as KMW Motorsports with TMR Engineering.); (United States) / KMW Motorsports with TMR Engineering	Alfa Romeo Giulietta TCR	3	(Venezuela) Alex Popow	1–6
(United States) / TMR Engineering and Consulting Inc.; (United States) / KMW Motorsports with TMR Engineering	Alfa Romeo Giulietta TCR	3	(United States) Alex Papadopulos	1–2, 4–6, 8–10
(United States) / TMR Engineering and Consulting Inc.; (United States) / KMW Motorsports with TMR Engineering	Alfa Romeo Giulietta TCR	3	(United States) Mark Kvamme	3, 7–8
(United States) / TMR Engineering and Consulting Inc.; (United States) / KMW Motorsports with TMR Engineering	Alfa Romeo Giulietta TCR	3	(United States) Trenton Estep	7, 10
(United States) / TMR Engineering and Consulting Inc.; (United States) / KMW Motorsports with TMR Engineering	Alfa Romeo Giulietta TCR	3	(United States) Ryan Nash	9
(United States) / TMR Engineering and Consulting Inc.; (United States) / KMW Motorsports with TMR Engineering	Alfa Romeo Giulietta TCR	5	(Argentina) Roy Block	All
(United States) / TMR Engineering and Consulting Inc.; (United States) / KMW Motorsports with TMR Engineering	Alfa Romeo Giulietta TCR	5	(Argentina) Tim Lewis Jr.	All
(United States) eEuroparts.com ROWE Racing	Audi RS 3 LMS TCR	10	(United States) Lee Carpentier	1–2
(United States) eEuroparts.com ROWE Racing	Audi RS 3 LMS TCR	10	(Cayman Islands) Kieron O'Rourke	1–2
(United States) eEuroparts.com ROWE Racing	Audi RS 3 LMS TCR	12	(United States) Russell McDonough	1–8
(United States) eEuroparts.com ROWE Racing	Audi RS 3 LMS TCR	12	(United States) Ryan Nash	1–8
(United States) Roadshagger Racing by eEuroparts.com	Audi RS 3 LMS TCR	61	(United States) Gavin Ernstone	All
(United States) Roadshagger Racing by eEuroparts.com	Audi RS 3 LMS TCR	61	(United States) Jonathan Morley	All
(United States) JDC-Miller MotorSports	Audi RS 3 LMS TCR	17	(United States) Britt Casey Jr.	2, 5, 7, 10
(United States) JDC-Miller MotorSports	Audi RS 3 LMS TCR	17	(South Africa) Mikey Taylor	2, 5, 10
(United States) JDC-Miller MotorSports	Audi RS 3 LMS TCR	17	(United States) Chris Miller	7
(United States) JDC-Miller MotorSports	Audi RS 3 LMS TCR	17	(Colombia) Gabby Chaves	8–9
(United States) JDC-Miller MotorSports	Audi RS 3 LMS TCR	17	(South Africa) Julian van der Watt	8–9
(United States) JDC-Miller MotorSports	Audi RS 3 LMS TCR	54	(United States) Michael Johnson	All
(United States) JDC-Miller MotorSports	Audi RS 3 LMS TCR	54	(South Africa) Stephen Simpson	All
(United States) JDC-Miller MotorSports	Audi RS 3 LMS TCR	54	(South Africa) Mikey Taylor	1, 4
(United States) Bryan Herta Autosport with Curb-Agajanian	Hyundai Veloster N TCR	21	(United States) Mason Filippi	All
(United States) Bryan Herta Autosport with Curb-Agajanian	Hyundai Veloster N TCR	21	(United States) Harry Gottsacker	All
(United States) Bryan Herta Autosport with Curb-Agajanian	Hyundai Veloster N TCR	98	(United States) Michael Lewis	All
(United States) Bryan Herta Autosport with Curb-Agajanian	Hyundai Veloster N TCR	98	(Canada) Mark Wilkins	All
(United States) FastMD	Audi RS 3 LMS TCR	23	(United States) Nick Galante	All
(United States) FastMD	Audi RS 3 LMS TCR	23	(Canada) James Vance	All
(United States) FastMD	Audi RS 3 LMS TCR	23	(United States) Jay Salinsky	1, 4
(United States) LA Honda World Racing	Honda Civic Type R TCR (FK8)	37	(United States) Shelby Blackstock	All
(United States) LA Honda World Racing	Honda Civic Type R TCR (FK8)	37	(United States) Tom O'Gorman	All
(United States) LA Honda World Racing	Honda Civic Type R TCR (FK8)	52	(United States) Colin Mullan	All
(United States) LA Honda World Racing	Honda Civic Type R TCR (FK8)	52	(United States) Max Faulkner	1–8
(United States) LA Honda World Racing	Honda Civic Type R TCR (FK8)	52	(United States) Harry Cheung	9
(United States) LA Honda World Racing	Honda Civic Type R TCR (FK8)	52	(United States) Mark Pombo	10
(United States) LA Honda World Racing	Honda Civic Type R TCR (FK8)	73	(United States) Mike LaMarra	1–4, 9–10
(United States) LA Honda World Racing	Honda Civic Type R TCR (FK8)	73	(United States) Mat Pombo	1–4, 9–10
(Canada) Mark Motors Racing	Audi RS 3 LMS TCR	81	(Canada) Marco Cirone	3, 5
(Canada) Mark Motors Racing	Audi RS 3 LMS TCR	81	(Canada) Remo Ruscitti	3, 5
(United States) Atlanta Speedwerks	Honda Civic Type R TCR (FK8)	84	(United States) Brian Henderson	All
(United States) Atlanta Speedwerks	Honda Civic Type R TCR (FK8)	84	(United States) Todd Lamb	All
(United States) Atlanta Speedwerks	Honda Civic Type R TCR (FK8)	94	(United States) Russell McDonough	10
(United States) Atlanta Speedwerks	Honda Civic Type R TCR (FK8)	94	(United States) Tyler Stone	10
(United States) HART	Honda Civic Type R TCR (FK8)	89	(United States) Ryan Eversley	1–7, 9–10
(United States) HART	Honda Civic Type R TCR (FK8)	89	(United States) Chad Gilsinger	1–7, 9–10

== Race results ==
Bold indicates overall winner.

Rnd	Circuit	GS Winning Car	TCR Winning Car
Rnd	Circuit	GS Winning Drivers	TCR Winning Drivers
1	(United States) Daytona	**(Canada) No. 75 Compass Racing**	(United States) No. 37 LA Honda World Racing
1	(United States) Daytona	**(United States) Paul Holton** **(Canada) Kuno Wittmer**	(United States) Shelby Blackstock (United States) Tom O'Gorman
2	(United States) Sebring	**(United States) No. 39 Carbahn Motorsports**	(United States) No. 37 LA Honda World Racing
2	(United States) Sebring	**(United States) Tyler McQuarrie** **(United States) Jeff Westphal**	(United States) Shelby Blackstock (United States) Tom O'Gorman
3	(United States) Mid-Ohio	**(United States) No. 7 Park Place Motorsports** **with VOLT Lightning**	(United States) No. 98 Bryan Herta Autosport with Curb-Agajanian
3	(United States) Mid-Ohio	**(United States) Alan Brynjolfsson** **(United States) Trent Hindman**	(United States) Michael Lewis (Canada) Mark Wilkins
4	(United States) Watkins Glen	**(United States) No. 35 Riley Motorsports**	(United States) No. 73 LA Honda World Racing
4	(United States) Watkins Glen	**(Netherlands) Jeroen Bleekemolen** **(United States) Jim Cox** **(United States) Dylan Murry**	(United States) Mike LaMarra (United States) Mat Pombo
5	(Canada) Mosport	**(United States) No. 71 Rebel Rock Racing**	(United States) No. 17 JDC-Miller MotorSports
5	(Canada) Mosport	**(United States) Frank DePew** **(United Kingdom) Robin Liddell**	(United States) Britt Casey Jr. (South Africa) Mikey Taylor
6	(United States) Lime Rock	**(United States) No. 46 Team TGM**	(United States) No. 98 Bryan Herta Autosport with Curb-Agajanian
6	(United States) Lime Rock	**(United States) Hugh Plumb** **(United States) Owen Trinkler**	(United States) Michael Lewis (Canada) Mark Wilkins
7	(United States) Road America	**(United States) No. 71 Rebel Rock Racing**	(United States) No. 21 Bryan Herta Autosport with Curb-Agajanian
7	(United States) Road America	**(United States) Frank DePew** **(United Kingdom) Robin Liddell**	(United States) Mason Filippi (United States) Harry Gottsacker
8	(United States) Virginia	**(United States) No. 60 KohR Motorsports**	(United States) No. 23 FastMD
8	(United States) Virginia	**(Canada) Kyle Marcelli** **(United States) Nate Stacy**	(United States) Nick Galante (Canada) James Vance
9	(United States) Laguna Seca	**(Germany) No. 33 Winward Racing/** **HTP Motorsport**	(United States) No. 61 Roadshagger Racing by eEuroparts.com
9	(United States) Laguna Seca	**(Austria) Dominik Baumann** **(United States) Russell Ward**	(United States) Gavin Ernstone (United States) Jonathan Morley
10	(United States) Road Atlanta	**(Canada) No. 15 Multimatic Motorsports**	(United States) No. 98 Bryan Herta Autosport with Curb-Agajanian
10	(United States) Road Atlanta	**(United States) Austin Cindric** **(United Kingdom) Sebastian Priaulx**	(United States) Michael Lewis (Canada) Mark Wilkins

== Championship standings ==
=== Points systems ===
Championship points are awarded in each class at the finish of each event. Points are awarded based on finishing positions as shown in the chart below.

Position	1	2	3	4	5	6	7	8	9	10	11	12	13	14	15	16	17	18	19	20	21	22	23	24	25	26	27	28	29	30	31+
Race	35	32	30	28	26	25	24	23	22	21	20	19	18	17	16	15	14	13	12	11	10	9	8	7	6	5	4	3	2	1	0

Team points

Team points are calculated in exactly the same way as driver points, using the point distribution chart. Each car entered is considered its own "team" regardless if it is a single entry or part of a two-car team.

=== Teams' Championships ===
==== Standings: Grand Sport ====
Pos.	Team	Car	DAY (United States)	SEB (United States)	MOH (United States)	WGL (United States)	MOS (Canada)	LIM (United States)	ELK (United States)	VIR (United States)	LGA (United States)	ATL (United States)	Points
1	#39 Carbahn with Peregrine Racing	Audi R8 LMS GT4	16	1	3	3	4	2	**4**	**2**	**2**	21	272
2	#69 Motorsport in Action	McLaren 570S GT4	3	3	7	8	3	7	7	10	9	2	260
3	#82 BimmerWorld Racing	BMW M4 GT4	4	2	9	2	6	4	9	19	14	12	237
4	#7 Park Place Motorsports with VOLT Lightning	Porsche 718 Cayman GT4 Clubsport	7	17	1	4	8	12	5	12	3	14	235
5	#60 KohR Motorsports	Ford Mustang GT4	27	5	5	12	2	6	12	1	6	19	223
6	#35 Riley Motorsports	Mercedes-AMG GT4	29	4	2	1	18	8	8	11	5	18	215
7	#56 Murillo Racing	Mercedes-AMG GT4	15	12	10	9	7	3	3	21	13	8	213
8	#46 Team TGM	Mercedes-AMG GT4	19	**13**	23	22	**12**	**1**	17	4	7	3	197
9	#71 Rebel Rock Racing	Chevrolet Camaro GT4.R	35	24	21	5	1	5	1	22	10	11	190
10	#40 PF Racing	Ford Mustang GT4	10	22	12	7	5	9	14	14	20	17	180
11	#4 Team TGM	Mercedes-AMG GT4	12	14	20	11	15	13	15	8	17	7	178
12	#75 Compass Racing	McLaren 570S GT4	**1**	23	22	23	22	19	2	9	22	6	175
13	#97 Automatic Racing AMR	Aston Martin Vantage AMR GT4	13	19	18	16	10	11	18	18	11	13	163
14	#65 Murillo Racing	Mercedes-AMG GT4	32	21	4	13	16	14	DNS	15	18	10	139
15	#13 AWA	Porsche 718 Cayman GT4 Clubsport; McLaren 570S GT4	28	18	17	23	11	16	10	25	19	5	138
16	#2 eEuroparts.com ROWE Racing	Audi R8 LMS GT4	31	8	**8**	15	9	17	6	20			135
17	#88 Stephen Cameron Racing	BMW M4 GT4	14	7	13	14			11	5		20	133
18	#57 Winward Racing/HTP Motorsport	Mercedes-AMG GT4	26	9	19	19	17	20	13	24	8	24	131
19	#33 Winward Racing/HTP Motorsport	Mercedes-AMG GT4	6	DNS	15	**20**	21	DNS		7	1	23	129
20	#96 Turner Motorsport	BMW M4 GT4	20	10	11	6		10		23		22	115
21	#59 KohR Motorsports	Ford Mustang GT4	11	6	6	10	DNS				12		110
22	#09 Automatic Racing AMR	Aston Martin V8 Vantage GT4; Aston Martin Vantage AMR GT4	23				19	15	19	6	15	**25**	95
23	#15 Multimatic Motorsports	Ford Mustang GT4	9	25			13					1	81
24	#22 Multimatic Motorsports	Ford Mustang GT4	5	15			14					9	81
25	#18 Moorespeed	Audi R8 LMS GT4								13	4	4	74
26	#8 eEuroparts.com ROWE Racing	Audi R8 LMS GT4	22	16	14	24	DNS		DNS	17			62
27	#99 Automatic Racing AMR	Aston Martin V8 Vantage GT4	2					18				15	61
28	#93 Carbahn with Peregrine Racing	Audi R8 LMS GT4		20		21			DNS	16	16		51
29	#80 BimmerWorld Racing	BMW M4 GT4	30						20	3			42
30	#44 NOLAsport	Porsche 718 Cayman GT4 Clubsport	8	26									28
31	#11 BGB Motorsports	Porsche 718 Cayman GT4 Clubsport	17	DNS		18							27
32	#31 Bodymotion Racing	Porsche 718 Cayman GT4 Clubsport	21		16								25
33	#58 KohR Motorsports	Ford Mustang GT4		11									20
34	#19 Stephen Cameron Racing	BMW M4 GT4										16	15
35	#41 PF Racing	Ford Mustang GT4							16				15
36	#28 RS1	Porsche 718 Cayman GT4 Clubsport	18										13
37	#6 ATLANTIC RACING TEAM	Mercedes-AMG GT4					20						11
38	#92 Ramsey Racing/EXR Team Prémat	Mercedes-AMG GT4									21		10
39	#66 TRG - The Racer's Group	Porsche 718 Cayman GT4 Clubsport	24										7
40	#26 Fast Track Racing/Classic BMW	BMW M4 GT4	25										6
41	#24 Ian Lacy Racing	Ford Mustang GT4	33										0
42	#67 TRG - The Racer's Group	Porsche 718 Cayman GT4 Clubsport	34										0
Pos.	Team	Car	DAY (United States)	SEB (United States)	MOH (United States)	WGL (United States)	MOS (Canada)	LIM (United States)	ELK (United States)	VIR (United States)	LGA (United States)	ATL (United States)	Points

Colour	Result
Gold	Winner
Silver	Second place
Bronze	Third place
Green	Points classification
Blue	Non-points classification
Blue	Non-classified finish (NC)
Purple	Retired, not classified (Ret)
Red	Did not qualify (DNQ)
Red	Did not pre-qualify (DNPQ)
Black	Disqualified (DSQ)
White	Did not start (DNS)
White	Withdrew (WD)
White	Race cancelled (C)
Blank	Did not practice (DNP)
Blank	Did not arrive (DNA)
Blank	Excluded (EX)

**Bold** - Pole position

==== Standings: Touring Car ====
Pos.	Team	Car	DAY (United States)	SEB (United States)	MOH (United States)	WGL (United States)	MOS (Canada)	LIM (United States)	ELK (United States)	VIR (United States)	LGA (United States)	ATL (United States)	Points
1	#98 Bryan Herta Autosport with Curb-Agajanian	Hyundai Veloster N TCR	9	6	1	**2**	12	**1**	4	**4**	**2**	1	291
2	#21 Bryan Herta Autosport with Curb-Agajanian	Hyundai Veloster N TCR	5	4	7	8	10	3	1	2	10	4	268
3	#61 Roadshagger Racing by eEuroparts.com	Audi RS 3 LMS TCR	10	10	2	3	3	11	3	8	1	6	267
4	#37 LA Honda World Racing	Honda Civic Type R TCR (FK8)	1	1	5	5	14	12	**2**	6	3	11	265
5	#84 Atlanta Speedwerks	Honda Civic Type R TCR (FK8)	4	8	8	7	4	4	5	11	5	5	252
6	#23 FastMD	Audi RS 3 LMS TCR	3	11	13	9	6	9	7	1	8	3	249
7	#52 LA Honda World Racing	Honda Civic Type R TCR (FK8)	7	5	11	13	2	6	6	10	9	9	235
8	#54 JDC-Miller MotorSports	Audi RS 3 LMS TCR	**14**	12	10	10	5	2	12	3	13	13	221
9	#5 KMW Motorsports with TMR Engineering	Alfa Romeo Giulietta TCR	12	14	9	6	7	10	11	7	4	14	217
10	#3 KMW Motorsports with TMR Engineering	Alfa Romeo Giulietta TCR	8	9	14	11	11	7	9	9	12	12	208
11	#89 HART	Honda Civic Type R TCR (FK8)	11	3	**6**	12	13	5	13		7	7	204
12	#12 eEuroparts.com ROWE Racing	Audi RS 3 LMS TCR	6	7	3	4	9	8	10	5			199
13	#17 JDC-Miller MotorSports	Audi RS 3 LMS TCR		**2**			**1**		8	12	6	**2**	166
14	#73 LA Honda World Racing	Honda Civic Type R TCR (FK8)	2	15	12	1					11	8	145
15	#81 Mark Motors Racing	Audi RS 3 LMS TCR			4		8						51
16	#10 eEuroparts.com ROWE Racing	Audi RS 3 LMS TCR	13	13									36
17	#94 Atlanta Speedwerks	Honda Civic Type R TCR (FK8)										10	21
Pos.	Team	Car	DAY (United States)	SEB (United States)	MOH (United States)	WGL (United States)	MOS (Canada)	LIM (United States)	ELK (United States)	VIR (United States)	LGA (United States)	ATL (United States)	Points

=== Manufacturers' Championships ===
==== Standings: Grand Sport ====
Pos.	Manufacturer	DAY (United States)	SEB (United States)	MOH (United States)	WGL (United States)	MOS (Canada)	LIM (United States)	ELK (United States)	VIR (United States)	LGA (United States)	ATL (United States)	Points
1	(Germany) Mercedes-AMG	6	**4**	2	**1**	**7**	**1**	3	4	1	3	304
2	(Germany) Audi	16	1	**3**	3	4	2	4	**2**	**2**	4	299
3	(United States) Ford	5	5	5	7	2	6	12	1	6	1	287
4	(United Kingdom) McLaren	**1**	3	7	8	3	7	2	9	9	2	285
5	(Germany) BMW	4	2	9	2	6	4	9	3	14	12	278
6	(United States) Chevrolet	35	24	21	5	1	5	1	22	10	11	267
7	(Germany) Porsche	7	17	1	4	8	12	5	12	3	14	263
8	(United Kingdom) Aston Martin	2	19	18	16	10	15	18	6	11	**13**	247
Pos.	Manufacturer	DAY (United States)	SEB (United States)	MOH (United States)	WGL (United States)	MOS (Canada)	LIM (United States)	ELK (United States)	VIR (United States)	LGA (United States)	ATL (United States)	Points

==== Standings: Touring Car ====
Pos.	Manufacturer	DAY (United States)	SEB (United States)	MOH (United States)	WGL (United States)	MOS (Canada)	LIM (United States)	ELK (United States)	VIR (United States)	LGA (United States)	ATL (United States)	Points
1	(Germany) Audi	**3**	**2**	2	3	**1**	2	3	1	1	**2**	325
2	(South Korea) Hyundai	5	4	1	**2**	10	**1**	1	**2**	**2**	1	324
3	(Japan) Honda	1	1	**5**	1	2	4	**2**	6	3	5	319
4	(Italy) Alfa Romeo	8	9	9	6	7	7	9	7	4	12	282
Pos.	Manufacturer	DAY (United States)	SEB (United States)	MOH (United States)	WGL (United States)	MOS (Canada)	LIM (United States)	ELK (United States)	VIR (United States)	LGA (United States)	ATL (United States)	Points
