= Canadian Touring Car Championship =

Canadian touring car road racing series

- Category: Touring cars
- Country: Canada
- Inaugural season: 2007
- Folded: 2020
- Tire suppliers: Pirelli
- Last Drivers' champion: Zachary Vanier
- Last Teams' champion: TWOth Autosport
- Official website: Canadian Touring Car Championship

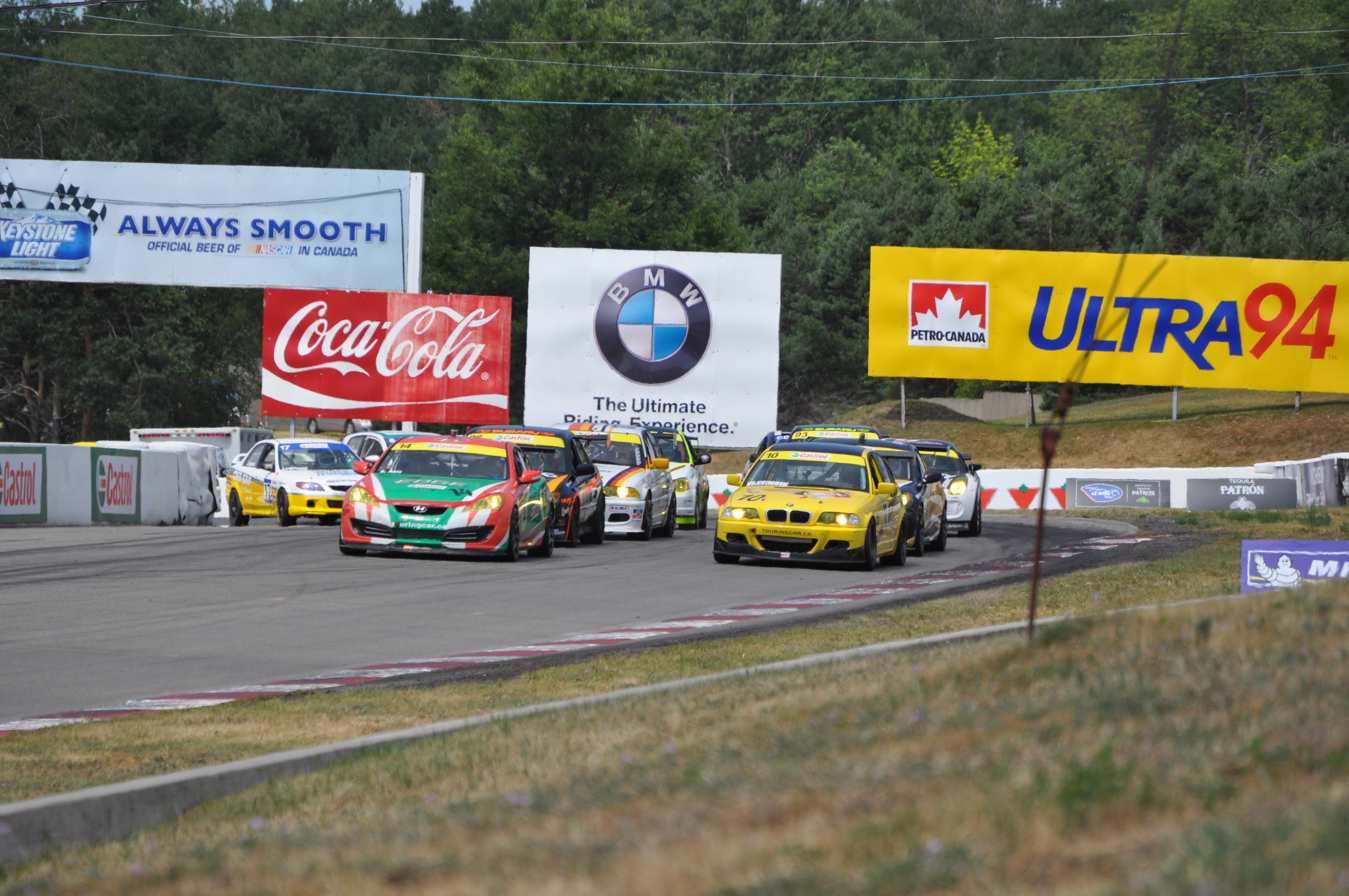
CTCC at Mosport in 2011

Canadian Touring Car Championship (CTCC) presented by Pirelli is a Canadian professional touring car road racing series. In 2006, it was created based on the growth of amateur touring car racing in Canada and the pent-up demand for a professional product.

CTCC is featured in Eastern Canada's main provinces, Ontario and Québec. Race events generally take place in the Greater Toronto Area, in the Greater Ottawa Area, in Mirabel, Montréal and Trois-Rivières. The competitor base expands reach all over Canada, but more specifically in Southern and Eastern Ontario, Québec and the United States.

Originally, the CTCC used a domestically developed BoP, but now the series parallels the IMSA SportsCar Challenge in using a combination of Group GT4 and TCR Touring Car regulations and homologations for its racing cars.

The CTCC went on hiatus before the 2022 season.

== Classes ==
=== TCR Class (2018–2020) ===
The international TCR Touring Car class was formally adopted in 2018 as a permanent replacement for the sedan/hatchback based classes. Still running to this date, CTCC is only Canadian series that has the homologated license to run this class. The car count in this class grows every year.

=== GT Sport Class (2014–2020) ===
The Grand Touring Class previously appeared only in CTCC's inaugural season in 2007, but rejoined the series in 2014 and includes makes such as Mustang, BMW, Nissan and Porsche. The class was briefly split into GT Sport and GT Cup. The class now includes a wider vehicle list.

=== GT Cup Class (2018–2019) ===
This GT Cup class comprised ultra performance race cars such as Corvette, Viper, Ferrari 430/458, Nissan GTR and Porsche 991/991 GT3. GT Cup class race cars competed on the track concurrently with the existing Touring, Super Touring and GT Sport classes.

=== Super Touring Class (2007–2019) ===
Super Touring Class machines have powerful and heavily modified engines and advanced aerodynamics. As with Touring Class, Super was replaced by the international TCR class.

=== Touring Class (2007–2019) ===
This class was the initial class of the championship, along with Super Touring. The Touring Class featured cars with minimal modifications. Touring Class was superseded by TCR

=== B-Spec Class (2013–2014) ===
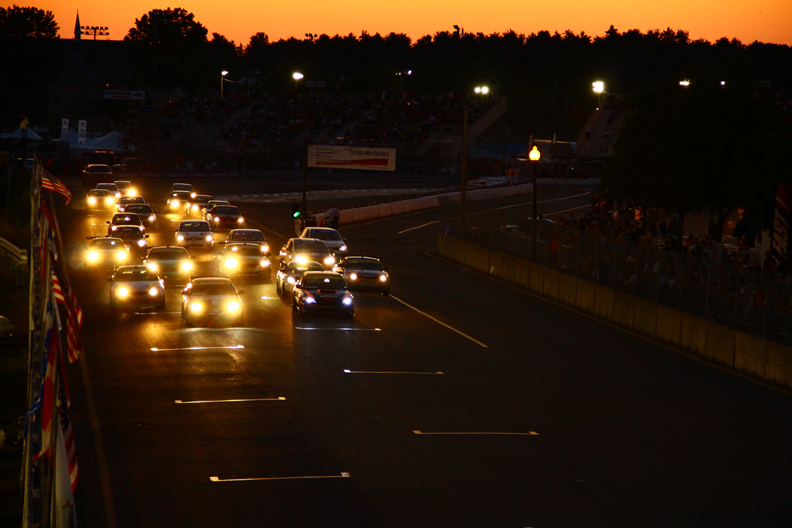
CTCC at Grand Prix de Trois-Rivières in 2011

The concept of B-Spec was first developed through collaboration between Honda Performance Development and Mazdaspeed Motorsports Development with the goal of creating a common set of rules that could be adopted by different racing series or sanctioning organizations. CTCC worked with the Sports Car Club of America and Grand-Am to solidify a set of rules that would respect both the B-Spec concept and goals of the different series. B-Spec is designed to be an entry-level and affordable category and highlights one of the fastest-growing segments of the automobile business. Both Honda and Mazda revealed their new prototypes in December 2010. Since then, the Honda Fit and Mazda 2 have been joined by the Ford Fiesta and Fiat 500 at various test sessions. Other eligible cars include the Chevrolet Sonic, Kia Rio, Mini Cooper, Nissan Versa and Toyota Yaris.

Like its Super and Touring Classes, the new B-Spec Class will have its own set of requirements and will feature showroom stock racing cars utilizing stock engines and chassis, fitted with a competition roll cage, racing seat and other safety equipment along with the approved Continental ExtremeContact race tires and Sunoco race fuel. Weight equalization will be used to balance performance among competing manufacturers.

The entry-level B-Spec Class introduces a compact car category with stock engine and strictly controlled modifications.

Following the 2014 CTCC season, in which there were 4 full time cars at the start of the year, the series decided to drop the class for 2015. Replacing the class for that year would be the return of the GT class.

== Manufacturers ==
Participating automotive brands include Acura, Audi, BMW, Chevrolet, Honda, Hyundai, Fiat, Ford, Mazda, MINI, Nissan, Scion, Subaru, Toyota and Volkswagen.

== Champions ==
Season	Category			
	GT	Super	Touring	
2007	(Ontario) Sasha Anis	(Quebec) Charles-Andre Bilodeau	(Quebec) Alain Lauzière	
	Super		Touring	
2008	(Ontario) Nigel Krikorian		(Ontario) Andre Rapone	
2009	(Quebec) Nick Wittmer		(Quebec) Alain Lauzière	
2010	(Quebec) Nick Wittmer		(Ontario) Anthony Rapone	
2011	(Quebec) Etienne Borgeat		(Ontario) Tom Kwok	
	Super		Touring	B-Spec
2012	(Ontario) Sasha Anis		(Ontario) Damon Sharpe	(Quebec) Nick Wittmer
2013	(Ontario) Scott Nicol		(Ontario) Damon Sharpe	(Quebec) Karl Wittmer
2014	(Quebec) Roger Ledoux		(Quebec) Michel Sallenbach	(Quebec) Normand Boyer
	Grand Touring		Super	Touring
2015	(Ontario) Ian Stanley Crerar		(Quebec) Roger Ledoux	(Quebec) Alain Lauzière
2016	(Quebec) Chris Sahakian		(Ontario) Eric Hochgeschurz	(Quebec) Michel Sallenbach
	GT Sport		Super	Touring
2017	(Ontario) Bob Attrell		(Ontario) Eric Hochgeschurz	(Quebec) Michel Sallenbach
	GT Cup	GT Sport	Super	Touring
2018	(Ontario) Bob Attrell	(Ontario) Ethan Simioni	(Ontario) Marc Raymond	(Ontario) Shawn Little
	GT Sport		TCR	
2019	(Alberta) Parker Thompson		(Ontario) Gary Kwok	
2020	(Ontario) Orey Fidani		(Ontario) Zachary Vanier	

== Race Tracks Visited by CTCC ==
Track	City	Province	Length	Turns	Layout
Calabogie Motorsports Park	Greater Madawaska; 45°18′10″N 76°40′20″W	Ontario	5.050 km (3.138 mi)	20	
Canadian Tire Motorsport Park	Bowmanville; 44°03′00″N 78°40′40″W	Ontario	3.957 km (2.459 mi)	10	
Circuit Grand Prix Trois-Rivières	Trois-Rivières; 46.3475°N 72.558611°W	Québec	2.462 km (1.530 mi)	10	
Shannonville Motorsport Park	Shannonville; 44.2254°N 77.1600°W	Ontario	4.030 km (2.504 mi)	14	
Toronto Street Circuit; Exhibition Place	Toronto; 43.633952°N 79.412512°W	Ontario	2.824 km (1.755 mi)	11	
Circuit Mont-Tremblant	Mont-Tremblant; 46.187707°N 74.609936°W	Québec	4.218 km (2.621 mi)	17	
Circuit Gilles Villeneuve	Montreal; 45°30′2.08″N 73°31′20.86″W	Québec	4.361 km (2.710 mi)	14	
Circuit ICAR	Mirabel; 45.682269°N 74.027229°W	Québec	3.420 km (2.125 mi)	16	

== See also ==
- World Touring Car Championship
- British Touring Car Championship
- Blancpain GT World Challenge America
- Continental Tire Sports Car Challenge
