= Gary Kwok =

Canadian racecar driver (born 1966)

- Nationality: (Canada) Canadian
- Born: June 11, 1966 (age 60) Hong Kong

Canadian Touring Car Championship career
- Current team: M&S Racing
- Starts: 129
- Wins: 20
- Poles: 5
- Best finish: 1 in 2019

Previous series
- 2005 2008 2009-2011: Hong Kong Touring Car Championship; Canadian GT Sprints Trophy; Canadian Touring Car Championship

Championship titles
- 2019: Canadian Touring Car Championship TCR Champion

Gary Kwok (born June 11, 1966) is best known as a Canadian race driver.

Kwok has raced in the Hong Kong Touring Car Championship, the Canadian Touring Car Championship, the Continental Tire Sports Car Challenge and the Pirelli World Challenge.

In 2011, Kwok drove for the Wiechers-Sport team in the World Touring Car Championship at Macau.

In 2019, Kwok was the Canadian Touring Car Championship TCR class champion.

== Career results ==
=== Complete World Touring Car Championship results ===
(key) (Races in bold indicate pole position) (Races in italics indicate fastest lap)

Year	Team	Car	1	2	3	4	5	6	7	8	9	10	11	12	13	14	15	16	17	18	19	20	21	22	23	24	DC	Points
2011	Wiechers-Sport	BMW 320TC	BRA; 1	BRA; 2	BEL; 1	BEL; 2	ITA; 1	ITA; 2	HUN; 1	HUN; 2	CZE; 1	CZE; 2	POR; 1	POR; 2	GBR; 1	GBR; 2	GER; 1	GER; 2	ESP; 1	ESP; 2	JPN; 1	JPN; 2	CHN; 1	CHN; 2	MAC; 1; 16	MAC; 2 Ret	**NC**	**0**
