= 2026 Grand Prix of Long Beach =

Third round of the 2026 IMSA SportsCar Championship season

The layout of Long Beach Street Circuit, where the race was held

The 2026 Grand Prix of Long Beach (formally known as the 2026 Acura Grand Prix of Long Beach) was a sports car race, held at Long Beach Street Circuit on April 19, 2026. It was the third round of the 2026 IMSA SportsCar Championship.

== Background ==
=== Preview ===
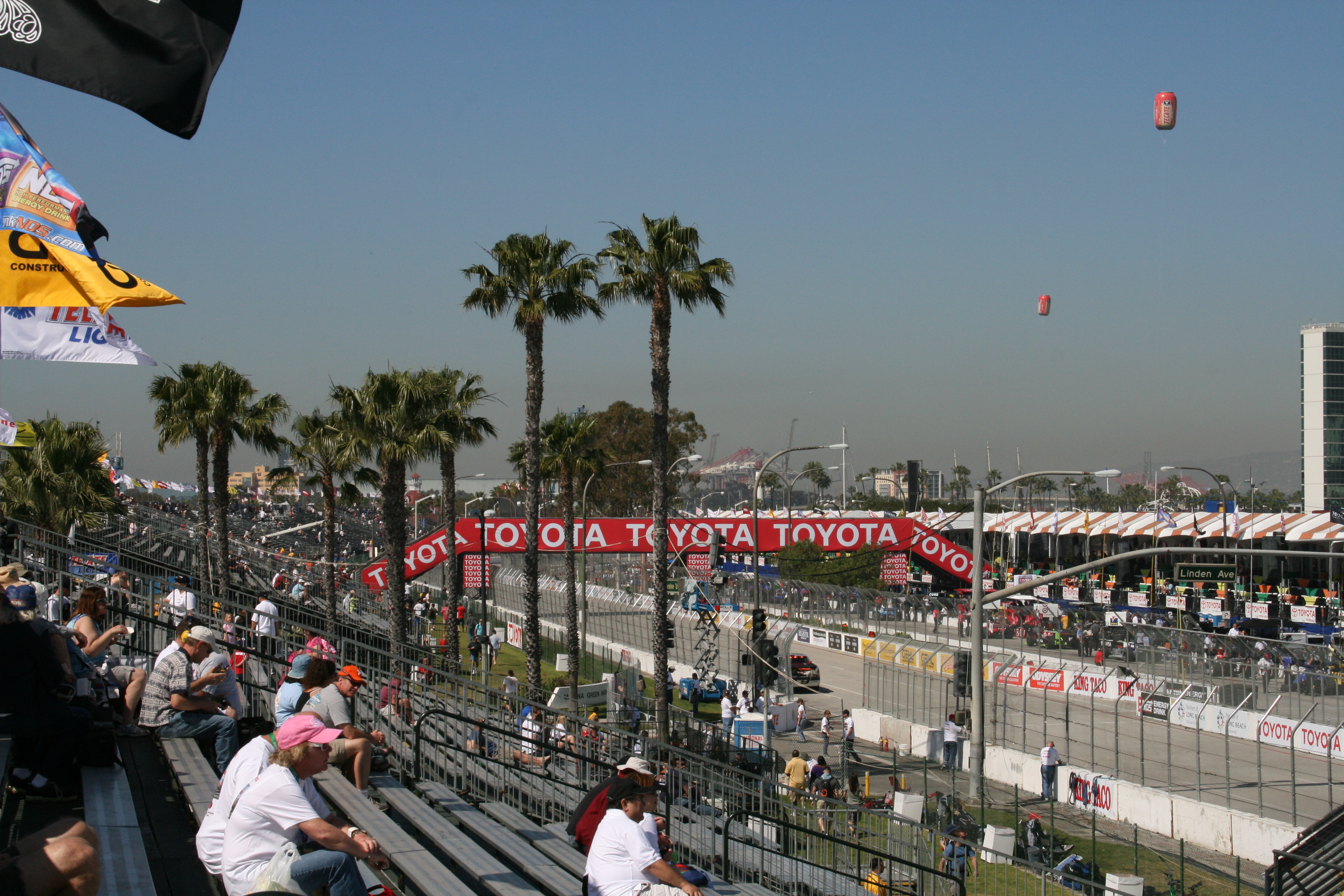
Long Beach Street Circuit (pictured in 2009), where the race was held

International Motor Sports Association (IMSA) president John Doonan confirmed the race was part of the schedule of the 2026 IMSA SportsCar Championship (IMSA SCC) in March 2025. It is the twelfth year the event was held as part of the WeatherTech SportsCar Championship, and the seventeenth annual running of the race, counting the period between 2006 and 2013 when it was a round of the Rolex Sports Car Series and the American Le Mans Series, respectively. The Grand Prix of Long Beach was the third of eleven scheduled sports car races of 2026 by IMSA. The race was held at the 1.968 mi (3.167 km) Long Beach Street Circuit on April 19, 2026.

== Race ==
=== Race results ===
Class winners are in bold and ‡.

Pos	Class	No	Team	Drivers	Chassis	Laps	Time/Retired
Pos	Class	No	Team	Drivers	Engine	Laps	Time/Retired
1	**GTP**	**93**	**(United States) Meyer Shank Racing with Curb-Agajanian**	**(Netherlands) Renger van der Zande** **(United Kingdom) Nick Yelloly**	**Acura ARX-06**	**70**	**1:40:50.272‡**
1	**GTP**	**93**	**(United States) Meyer Shank Racing with Curb-Agajanian**	**(Netherlands) Renger van der Zande** **(United Kingdom) Nick Yelloly**	**Acura AR24e 2.4 L Turbo V6**	**70**	**1:40:50.272‡**
2	GTP	31	(United States) Cadillac Whelen	(United Kingdom) Jack Aitken (Denmark) Frederik Vesti	Cadillac V-Series.R	70	+0.818
2	GTP	31	(United States) Cadillac Whelen	(United Kingdom) Jack Aitken (Denmark) Frederik Vesti	Cadillac LMC55R 5.5 L V8	70	+0.818
3	GTP	6	(Germany) Porsche Penske Motorsport	(France) Kévin Estre (Belgium) Laurens Vanthoor	Porsche 963	70	+2.429
3	GTP	6	(Germany) Porsche Penske Motorsport	(France) Kévin Estre (Belgium) Laurens Vanthoor	Porsche 9RD 4.6 L Turbo V8	70	+2.429
4	GTP	7	(Germany) Porsche Penske Motorsport	(France) Julien Andlauer (Brazil) Felipe Nasr	Porsche 963	70	+3.272
4	GTP	7	(Germany) Porsche Penske Motorsport	(France) Julien Andlauer (Brazil) Felipe Nasr	Porsche 9RD 4.6 L Turbo V8	70	+3.272
5	GTP	24	(Belgium) BMW M Team WRT	(South Africa) Sheldon van der Linde (Belgium) Dries Vanthoor	BMW M Hybrid V8	70	+3.671
5	GTP	24	(Belgium) BMW M Team WRT	(South Africa) Sheldon van der Linde (Belgium) Dries Vanthoor	BMW P66/3 4.0 L Turbo V8	70	+3.671
6	GTP	5	(United States) JDC-Miller MotorSports	(Netherlands) Tijmen van der Helm (Germany) Laurin Heinrich	Porsche 963	70	+4.494
6	GTP	5	(United States) JDC-Miller MotorSports	(Netherlands) Tijmen van der Helm (Germany) Laurin Heinrich	Porsche 9RD 4.6 L Turbo V8	70	+4.494
7	GTP	60	(United States) Meyer Shank Racing with Curb-Agajanian	(United Kingdom) Tom Blomqvist (United States) Colin Braun	Acura ARX-06	70	+5.103
7	GTP	60	(United States) Meyer Shank Racing with Curb-Agajanian	(United Kingdom) Tom Blomqvist (United States) Colin Braun	Acura AR24e 2.4 L Turbo V6	70	+5.103
8	GTP	40	(United States) Cadillac Wayne Taylor Racing	(Switzerland) Louis Delétraz (United States) Jordan Taylor	Cadillac V-Series.R	70	+6.022
8	GTP	40	(United States) Cadillac Wayne Taylor Racing	(Switzerland) Louis Delétraz (United States) Jordan Taylor	Cadillac LMC55R 5.5 L V8	70	+6.022
9	GTP	23	(United States) Aston Martin THOR Team	(Canada) Roman De Angelis (United Kingdom) Ross Gunn	Aston Martin Valkyrie	69	+1 Lap
9	GTP	23	(United States) Aston Martin THOR Team	(Canada) Roman De Angelis (United Kingdom) Ross Gunn	Aston Martin RA 6.5 L V12	69	+1 Lap
10	**GTD**	**12**	**(United States) Vasser Sullivan Racing**	**(Denmark) Benjamin Pedersen** **(United States) Aaron Telitz**	**Lexus RC F GT3**	**68**	**+2 Laps**
10	**GTD**	**12**	**(United States) Vasser Sullivan Racing**	**(Denmark) Benjamin Pedersen** **(United States) Aaron Telitz**	**Toyota 2UR-GSE 5.4 L V8**	**68**	**+2 Laps**
11	GTD	96	(United States) Turner Motorsport	(United States) Robby Foley (United States) Patrick Gallagher	BMW M4 GT3 Evo	68	+2 Laps
11	GTD	96	(United States) Turner Motorsport	(United States) Robby Foley (United States) Patrick Gallagher	BMW P58 3.0 L Turbo I6	68	+2 Laps
12	GTD	34	(United States) Conquest Racing	(Spain) Albert Costa (United States) Manny Franco	Ferrari 296 GT3 Evo	68	+2 Laps
12	GTD	34	(United States) Conquest Racing	(Spain) Albert Costa (United States) Manny Franco	Ferrari F163CE 3.0 L Turbo V6	68	+2 Laps
13	GTD	70	(United Kingdom) Inception Racing	(United States) Brendan Iribe (Denmark) Frederik Schandorff	Ferrari 296 GT3 Evo	68	+2 Laps
13	GTD	70	(United Kingdom) Inception Racing	(United States) Brendan Iribe (Denmark) Frederik Schandorff	Ferrari F163CE 3.0 L Turbo V6	68	+2 Laps
14	GTD	89	(United States) Vasser Sullivan Racing	(United Kingdom) Jack Hawksworth (United States) Frankie Montecalvo	Lexus RC F GT3	68	+2 Laps
14	GTD	89	(United States) Vasser Sullivan Racing	(United Kingdom) Jack Hawksworth (United States) Frankie Montecalvo	Toyota 2UR-GSE 5.4 L V8	68	+2 Laps
15	GTD	36	(United States) DXDT Racing	(United States) Mason Filippi (Canada) Robert Wickens	Chevrolet Corvette Z06 GT3.R	68	+2 Laps
15	GTD	36	(United States) DXDT Racing	(United States) Mason Filippi (Canada) Robert Wickens	Chevrolet LT6.R 5.5 L V8	68	+2 Laps
16	GTD	16	(United States) Myers Riley Motorsports	(Brazil) Felipe Fraga (United States) Sheena Monk	Ford Mustang GT3 Evo	68	+2 Laps
16	GTD	16	(United States) Myers Riley Motorsports	(Brazil) Felipe Fraga (United States) Sheena Monk	Ford Coyote 5.4 L V8	68	+2 Laps
17	GTD	19	(United States) van der Steur Racing	(France) Valentin Hasse-Clot (United States) Rory van der Steur	Aston Martin Vantage AMR GT3 Evo	68	+2 Laps
17	GTD	19	(United States) van der Steur Racing	(France) Valentin Hasse-Clot (United States) Rory van der Steur	Aston Martin AMR16A 4.0 L Turbo V8	68	+2 Laps
18	GTD	57	(United States) Winward Racing	(Switzerland) Philip Ellis (United States) Russell Ward	Mercedes-AMG GT3 Evo	68	+2 Laps
18	GTD	57	(United States) Winward Racing	(Switzerland) Philip Ellis (United States) Russell Ward	Mercedes-AMG M159 6.2 L V8	68	+2 Laps
19	GTD	27	(United States) Heart of Racing Team	(Brazil) Eduardo Barrichello (United States) Spencer Pumpelly	Aston Martin Vantage AMR GT3 Evo	68	+2 Laps
19	GTD	27	(United States) Heart of Racing Team	(Brazil) Eduardo Barrichello (United States) Spencer Pumpelly	Aston Martin AMR16A 4.0 L Turbo V8	68	+2 Laps
20	GTD	81	(United States) DragonSpeed	(Italy) Giacomo Altoè (Sweden) Henrik Hedman	Chevrolet Corvette Z06 GT3.R	68	+2 Laps
20	GTD	81	(United States) DragonSpeed	(Italy) Giacomo Altoè (Sweden) Henrik Hedman	Chevrolet LT6.R 5.5 L V8	68	+2 Laps
21	GTD	13	(Canada) 13 Autosport	(United Kingdom) Matt Bell (Canada) Orey Fidani	Chevrolet Corvette Z06 GT3.R	68	+2 Laps
21	GTD	13	(Canada) 13 Autosport	(United Kingdom) Matt Bell (Canada) Orey Fidani	Chevrolet LT6.R 5.5 L V8	68	+2 Laps
22	GTD	177	(United States) AO Racing	(United Kingdom) Harry King (Denmark) Mikkel O. Pedersen	Porsche 911 GT3 R (992.2)	68	+2 Laps
22	GTD	177	(United States) AO Racing	(United Kingdom) Harry King (Denmark) Mikkel O. Pedersen	Porsche M97/80 4.2 L Flat-6	68	+2 Laps
23	GTP	10	(United States) Cadillac Wayne Taylor Racing	(Portugal) Filipe Albuquerque (United States) Ricky Taylor	Cadillac V-Series.R	67	+3 Laps
23	GTP	10	(United States) Cadillac Wayne Taylor Racing	(Portugal) Filipe Albuquerque (United States) Ricky Taylor	Cadillac LMC55R 5.5 L V8	67	+3 Laps
24	GTP	25	(Belgium) BMW M Team WRT	(Austria) Philipp Eng (Germany) Marco Wittmann	BMW M Hybrid V8	67	+3 Laps
24	GTP	25	(Belgium) BMW M Team WRT	(Austria) Philipp Eng (Germany) Marco Wittmann	BMW P66/3 4.0 L Turbo V8	67	+3 Laps
25	GTD	46	(Canada) Pfaff Motorsports	(Italy) Andrea Caldarelli (Canada) Zachary Vanier	Lamborghini Temerario GT3	67	+3 Laps
25	GTD	46	(Canada) Pfaff Motorsports	(Italy) Andrea Caldarelli (Canada) Zachary Vanier	Lamborghini L411 4.0 L Turbo V8	67	+3 Laps
26	GTD	120	(United States) Wright Motorsports	(United States) Adam Adelson (United Kingdom) Callum Ilott	Porsche 911 GT3 R (992.2)	67	+3 Laps
26	GTD	120	(United States) Wright Motorsports	(United States) Adam Adelson (United Kingdom) Callum Ilott	Porsche M97/80 4.2 L Flat-6	67	+3 Laps
27 DNF	GTD	66	(United States) Gradient Racing	(United States) Jake Walker (United States) Corey Lewis	Ford Mustang GT3 Evo	60	Incident
27 DNF	GTD	66	(United States) Gradient Racing	(United States) Jake Walker (United States) Corey Lewis	Ford Coyote 5.4 L V8	60	Incident
28 DNF	GTD	45	(United States) Wayne Taylor Racing	(Costa Rica) Danny Formal (United States) Trent Hindman	Lamborghini Huracán GT3 Evo 2	11	Electrical
28 DNF	GTD	45	(United States) Wayne Taylor Racing	(Costa Rica) Danny Formal (United States) Trent Hindman	Lamborghini DGF 5.2 L V10	11	Electrical

IMSA SportsCar Championship
Previous race: 12 Hours of Sebring	2026 season	Next race: Monterey SportsCar Championship
