= 2026 Detroit Sports Car Classic =

Fifth round of the 2026 IMSA SportsCar Championship season

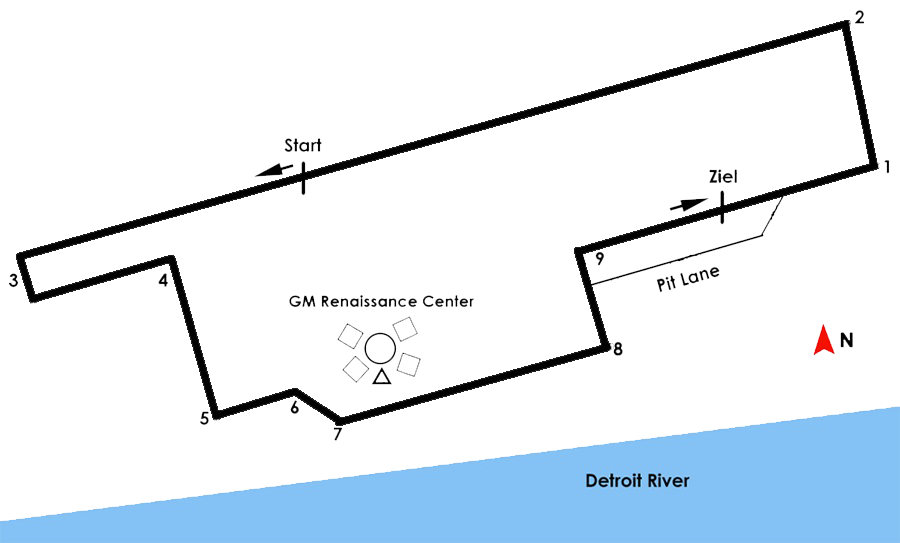
The layout of the Detroit street circuit, where the race was held

The 2026 Detroit Sports Car Classic (known as the 2026 Chevrolet Detroit Sports Car Classic for sponsorship reasons) was a sports car race held at the Detroit street circuit in Detroit, Michigan, on May 30, 2026. It was the fifth round of the 2026 IMSA SportsCar Championship.

== Background ==
=== Preview ===
The event was the third time the IMSA SportsCar Championship raced at the Detroit street circuit. The 2026 Detroit Sports Car Classic was the fifth of eleven rounds scheduled in 2026, and only the GTP and GTD Pro classes participated. The Detroit street circuit is 1.645 mi (2.647 km) long. The race was held during the same weekend in which the IndyCar Series held the 2026 Detroit Grand Prix at the same circuit.

== Race ==
=== Post-race ===
Class winners are in bold and ‡.

Pos	Class	No	Team	Drivers	Chassis	Laps	Time/Retired
Pos	Class	No	Team	Drivers	Engine	Laps	Time/Retired
1	**GTP**	**31**	**(United States) Cadillac Whelen**	**(United Kingdom) Jack Aitken (New Zealand) Earl Bamber**	**Cadillac V-Series.R**	**82**	**1:40:37.110‡**
1	**GTP**	**31**	**(United States) Cadillac Whelen**	**(United Kingdom) Jack Aitken (New Zealand) Earl Bamber**	**Cadillac LMC55R 5.5 L V8**	**82**	**1:40:37.110‡**
2	GTP	25	(Belgium) BMW M Team WRT	(Austria) Philipp Eng (Germany) Marco Wittmann	BMW M Hybrid V8	82	+6.023
2	GTP	25	(Belgium) BMW M Team WRT	(Austria) Philipp Eng (Germany) Marco Wittmann	BMW P66/3 4.0 L Turbo V8	82	+6.023
3	GTP	10	(United States) Cadillac Wayne Taylor Racing	(United States) Ricky Taylor (Portugal) Filipe Albuquerque	Cadillac V-Series.R	82	+6.758
3	GTP	10	(United States) Cadillac Wayne Taylor Racing	(United States) Ricky Taylor (Portugal) Filipe Albuquerque	Cadillac LMC55R 5.5 L V8	82	+6.758
4	GTP	93	(United States) Acura Meyer Shank Racing with Curb-Agajanian	(Netherlands) Renger van der Zande (United Kingdom) Nick Yelloly	Acura ARX-06	82	+7.341
4	GTP	93	(United States) Acura Meyer Shank Racing with Curb-Agajanian	(Netherlands) Renger van der Zande (United Kingdom) Nick Yelloly	Acura AR24e 2.4 L Turbo V6	82	+7.341
5	GTP	7	(Germany) Porsche Penske Motorsport	(Brazil) Felipe Nasr (France) Julien Andlauer	Porsche 963	82	+8.269
5	GTP	7	(Germany) Porsche Penske Motorsport	(Brazil) Felipe Nasr (France) Julien Andlauer	Porsche 9RD 4.6 L Turbo V8	82	+8.269
6	GTP	40	(United States) Cadillac Wayne Taylor Racing	(United States) Jordan Taylor (Switzerland) Louis Delétraz	Cadillac V-Series.R	82	+9.871
6	GTP	40	(United States) Cadillac Wayne Taylor Racing	(United States) Jordan Taylor (Switzerland) Louis Delétraz	Cadillac LMC55R 5.5 L V8	82	+9.871
7	GTP	60	(United States) Acura Meyer Shank Racing with Curb-Agajanian	(United Kingdom) Tom Blomqvist (United States) Colin Braun	Acura ARX-06	82	+10.215
7	GTP	60	(United States) Acura Meyer Shank Racing with Curb-Agajanian	(United Kingdom) Tom Blomqvist (United States) Colin Braun	Acura AR24e 2.4 L Turbo V6	82	+10.215
8	GTP	6	(Germany) Porsche Penske Motorsport	(Belgium) Laurens Vanthoor (France) Kévin Estre	Porsche 963	82	+10.735
8	GTP	6	(Germany) Porsche Penske Motorsport	(Belgium) Laurens Vanthoor (France) Kévin Estre	Porsche 9RD 4.6 L Turbo V8	82	+10.735
9	GTP	24	(Belgium) BMW M Team WRT	(South Africa) Sheldon van der Linde (Belgium) Dries Vanthoor	BMW M Hybrid V8	82	+11.418
9	GTP	24	(Belgium) BMW M Team WRT	(South Africa) Sheldon van der Linde (Belgium) Dries Vanthoor	BMW P66/3 4.0 L Turbo V8	82	+11.418
10	GTP	23	(United States) Aston Martin THOR Team	(United Kingdom) Ross Gunn (Canada) Roman De Angelis	Aston Martin Valkyrie AMR-LMH	82	+12.558
10	GTP	23	(United States) Aston Martin THOR Team	(United Kingdom) Ross Gunn (Canada) Roman De Angelis	Aston Martin RA 6.5 L V12	82	+12.558
11	GTP	5	(United States) JDC–Miller MotorSports	(Netherlands) Tijmen van der Helm (Germany) Laurin Heinrich	Porsche 963	80	+2 Laps
11	GTP	5	(United States) JDC–Miller MotorSports	(Netherlands) Tijmen van der Helm (Germany) Laurin Heinrich	Porsche 9RD 4.6 L Turbo V8	80	+2 Laps
12	**GTD Pro**	**3**	**(United States) Corvette Racing by Pratt Miller Motorsports**	**(Spain) Antonio García (United Kingdom) Alexander Sims**	**Chevrolet Corvette Z06 GT3.R**	**79**	**+3 Laps‡**
12	**GTD Pro**	**3**	**(United States) Corvette Racing by Pratt Miller Motorsports**	**(Spain) Antonio García (United Kingdom) Alexander Sims**	**Chevrolet LT6.R 5.5 L V8**	**79**	**+3 Laps‡**
13	GTD Pro	9	(Canada) Pfaff Motorsports	(Italy) Andrea Caldarelli (United Kingdom) Sandy Mitchell	Lamborghini Temerario GT3	79	+3 Laps
13	GTD Pro	9	(Canada) Pfaff Motorsports	(Italy) Andrea Caldarelli (United Kingdom) Sandy Mitchell	Lamborghini L411 4.0 L Turbo V8	79	+3 Laps
14	GTD Pro	65	(United States) Ford Racing	(Germany) Christopher Mies (Belgium) Frédéric Vervisch	Ford Mustang GT3 Evo	79	+3 Laps
14	GTD Pro	65	(United States) Ford Racing	(Germany) Christopher Mies (Belgium) Frédéric Vervisch	Ford Coyote 5.4 L V8	79	+3 Laps
15	GTD Pro	1	(United States) Paul Miller Racing	(United States) Neil Verhagen (United States) Connor De Phillippi	BMW M4 GT3 Evo	79	+3 Laps
15	GTD Pro	1	(United States) Paul Miller Racing	(United States) Neil Verhagen (United States) Connor De Phillippi	BMW P58 3.0 L Turbo I6	79	+3 Laps
16	GTD Pro	64	(United States) Ford Racing	(United Kingdom) Ben Barker (Norway) Dennis Olsen	Ford Mustang GT3 Evo	79	+3 Laps
16	GTD Pro	64	(United States) Ford Racing	(United Kingdom) Ben Barker (Norway) Dennis Olsen	Ford Coyote 5.4 L V8	79	+3 Laps
17	GTD Pro	14	(United States) Vasser Sullivan Racing	(United Kingdom) Jack Hawksworth (United Kingdom) Ben Barnicoat	Lexus RC F GT3	79	+3 Laps
17	GTD Pro	14	(United States) Vasser Sullivan Racing	(United Kingdom) Jack Hawksworth (United Kingdom) Ben Barnicoat	Toyota 2UR-GSE 5.4 L V8	79	+3 Laps
18	GTD Pro	4	(United States) Corvette Racing by Pratt Miller Motorsports	(United States) Tommy Milner (Netherlands) Nicky Catsburg	Chevrolet Corvette Z06 GT3.R	79	+3 Laps
18	GTD Pro	4	(United States) Corvette Racing by Pratt Miller Motorsports	(United States) Tommy Milner (Netherlands) Nicky Catsburg	Chevrolet LT6.R 5.5 L V8	79	+3 Laps
19	GTD Pro	59	(United States) RLL Team McLaren	(United States) Max Esterson (United States) Nikita Johnson	McLaren 720S GT3 Evo	79	+3 Laps
19	GTD Pro	59	(United States) RLL Team McLaren	(United States) Max Esterson (United States) Nikita Johnson	McLaren M840T 4.0 L Turbo V8	79	+3 Laps
20	GTD Pro	77	(United States) AO Racing	(United Kingdom) Nick Tandy (United Kingdom) Harry King	Porsche 911 GT3 R (992.2)	78	+4 Laps
20	GTD Pro	77	(United States) AO Racing	(United Kingdom) Nick Tandy (United Kingdom) Harry King	Porsche M97/80 4.2 L Flat-6	78	+4 Laps
21	GTD Pro	15	(United States) Vasser Sullivan Racing	(United States) Aaron Telitz (Australia) Chaz Mostert	Lexus RC F GT3	78	+4 Laps
21	GTD Pro	15	(United States) Vasser Sullivan Racing	(United States) Aaron Telitz (Australia) Chaz Mostert	Toyota 2UR-GSE 5.4 L V8	78	+4 Laps

== Standings after the race ==
IMSA SportsCar Championship
Previous race: Monterey SportsCar Championship	2026 season	Next race: Sahlen's Six Hours of the Glen
