= 2026 IMSA SportsCar Championship =

Motor racing championship

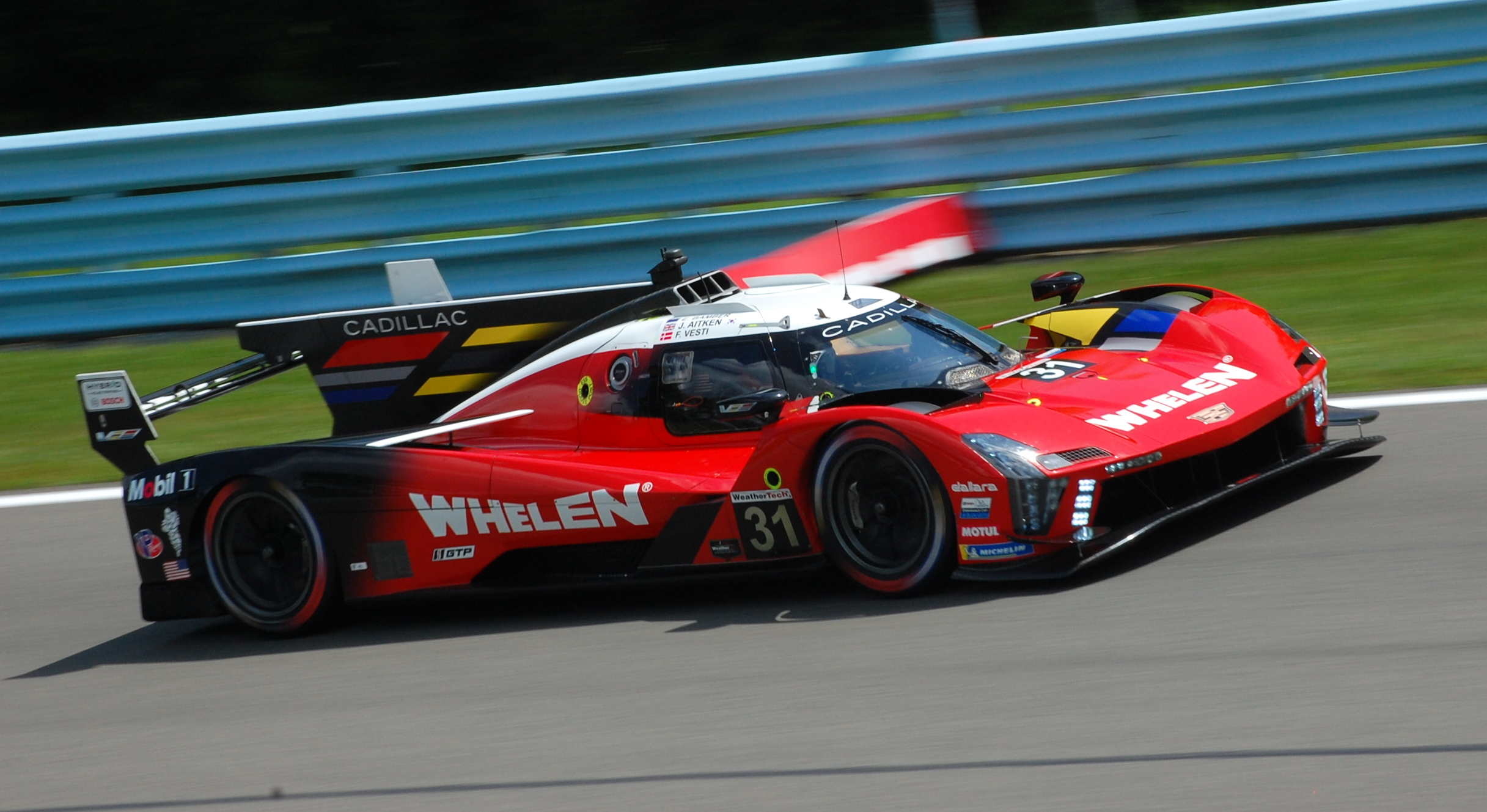
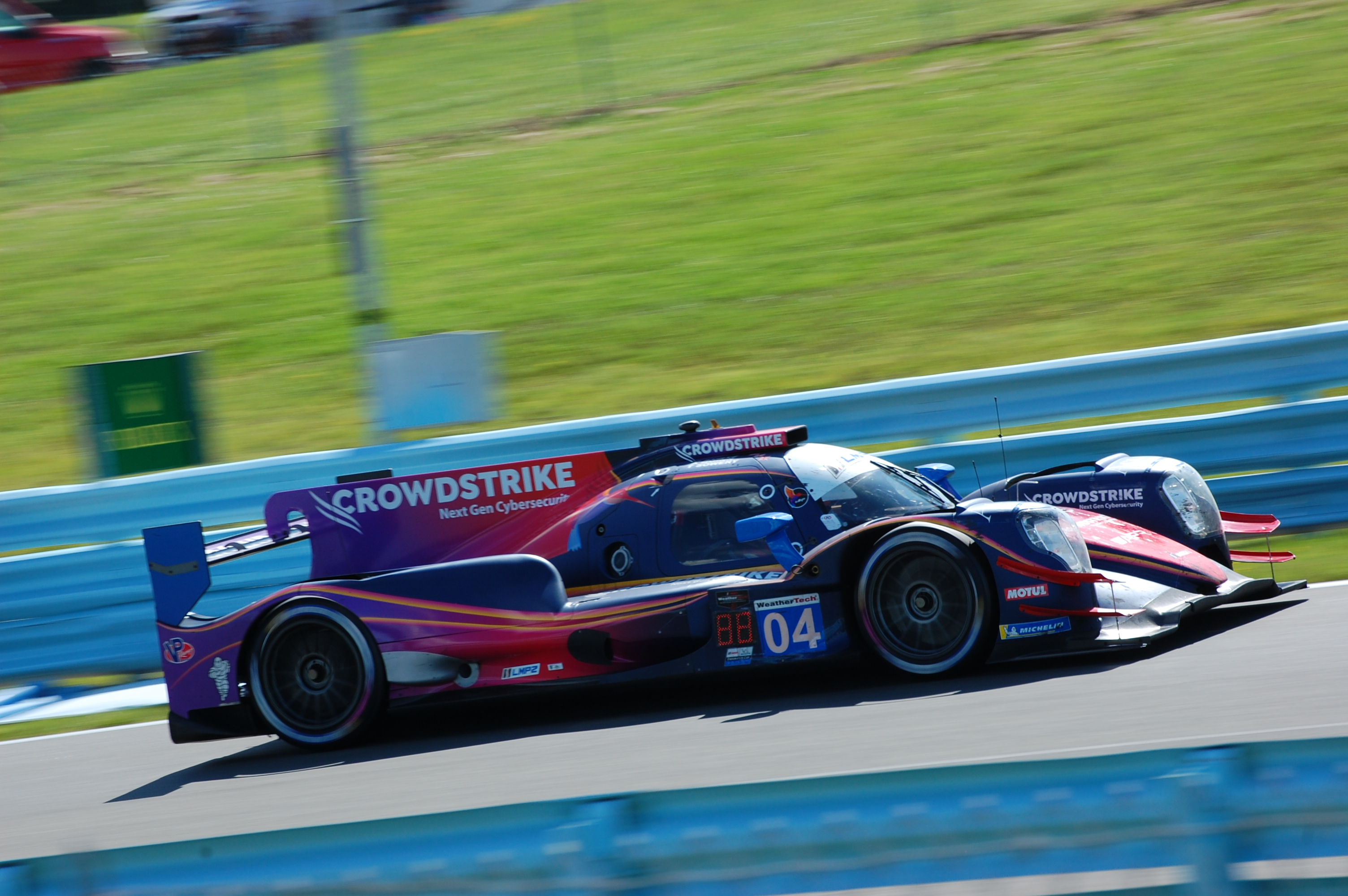
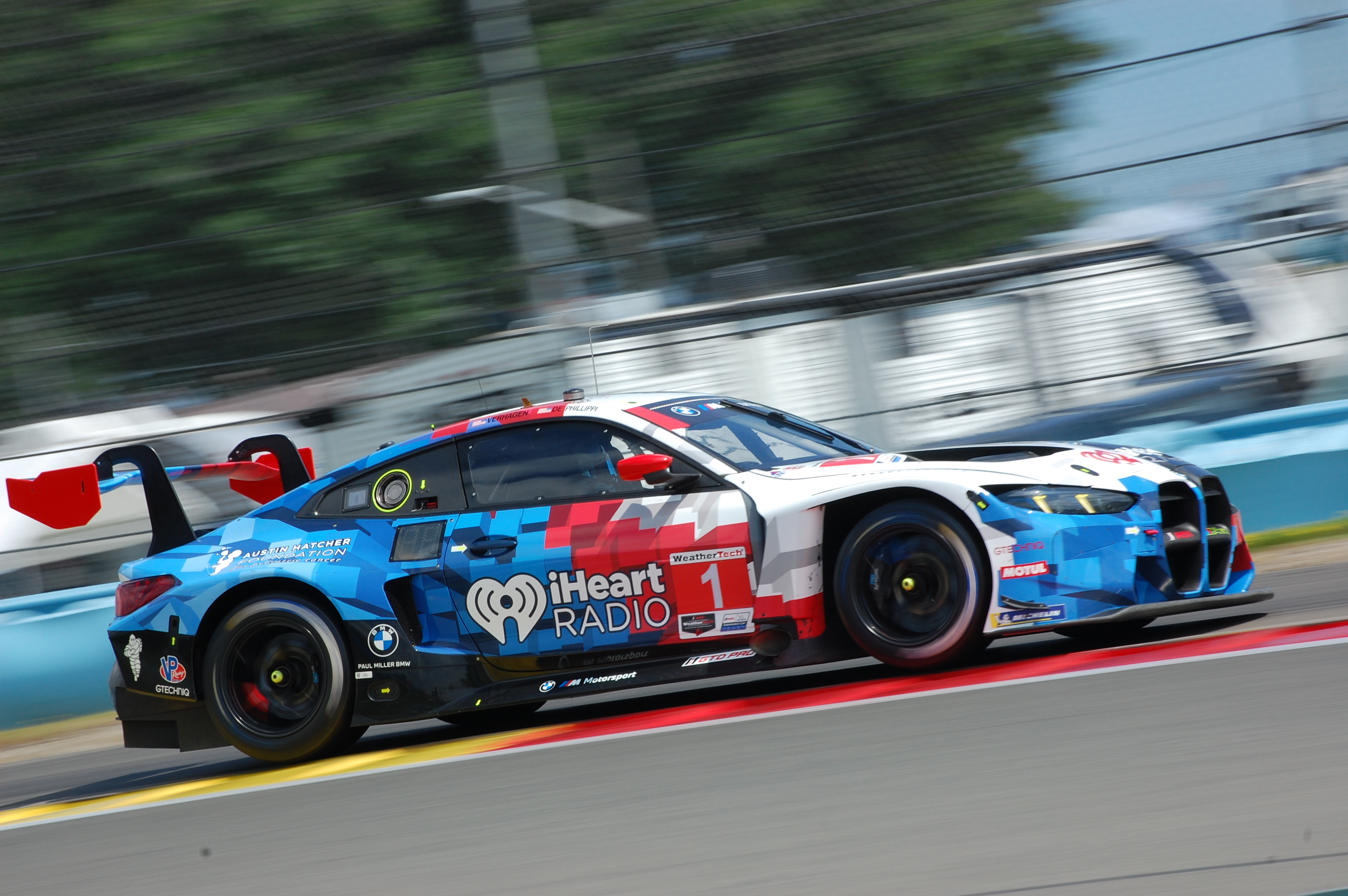
The No. 31 Cadillac Whelen won the GTP Teams' Championship, with Cadillac winning the GTP Manufacturers' Championship. The No. 04 CrowdStrike Racing by APR won the LMP2 Teams' Championship. The No. 1 Paul Miller Racing BMW won the GTD Pro Teams' Championship, while Chevrolet won the GTD Pro Manufacturers’ Championship. The No. 57 Winward Racing Mercedes-AMG won the GTD Teams' Championship.

The 2026 IMSA SportsCar Championship (known for sponsorship reasons as the 2026 IMSA WeatherTech SportsCar Championship) was a motor racing championship and the 56th racing season sanctioned by the International Motor Sports Association, which traces its lineage back to the 1971 IMSA GT Championship. It was also the thirteenth season of the IMSA SportsCar Championship since the merger between the American Le Mans Series and the Rolex Sports Car Series in 2014, and the eleventh under the sponsorship of WeatherTech.

== Classes ==
- Grand Touring Prototype (GTP) (LMDh and LMH)
- Le Mans Prototype 2 (LMP2)
- GT Daytona Pro (GTD Pro)
- GT Daytona (GTD)

== Schedule ==
The provisional schedule was released on March 13, 2025, and features 11 rounds. The calendar remained the same as the previous season, but the Battle on the Bricks reverted to a 2-hour, 40-minute race as it was in 2023 while the Motul SportsCar Grand Prix event at Road America would be the first in IMSA sports car racing history to run a 6-hour endurance race at that venue.

Race is part of the Michelin Endurance Cup

Rnd.	Race	Length	Classes	Circuit	Location	Date
1	Rolex 24 at Daytona	24 hours	All	Daytona International Speedway	Daytona Beach, Florida	January 24–25
2	Mobil 1 Twelve Hours of Sebring	12 hours	All	Sebring International Raceway	Sebring, Florida	March 21
3	Acura Grand Prix of Long Beach	1 hour, 40 minutes	GTP, GTD	Long Beach Street Circuit	Long Beach, California	April 18
4	StubHub Monterey SportsCar Championship	2 hours, 40 minutes	GTP, GTD Pro, GTD	WeatherTech Raceway Laguna Seca	Monterey, California	May 3
5	Chevrolet Detroit Sports Car Classic	1 hour, 40 minutes	GTP, GTD Pro	Detroit Street Circuit	Detroit, Michigan	May 30
6	Sahlen's Six Hours of The Glen	6 hours	All	Watkins Glen International	Watkins Glen, New York	June 28
7	Chevrolet Grand Prix	2 hours, 40 minutes	LMP2, GTD Pro, GTD	Canadian Tire Motorsport Park	Bowmanville, Ontario	July 12
8	Motul SportsCar Endurance Grand Prix	6 hours	All	Road America	Elkhart Lake, Wisconsin	August 2
9	Michelin GT Challenge at VIR	2 hours, 40 minutes	GTD Pro, GTD	Virginia International Raceway	Alton, Virginia	August 23
10	Tirerack.com Battle on the Bricks	2 hours, 40 minutes	All	Indianapolis Motor Speedway	Speedway, Indiana	September 20
11	Motul Petit Le Mans	10 hours	All	Michelin Raceway Road Atlanta	Braselton, Georgia	October 3

== Entries ==
=== Grand Touring Prototype (GTP) ===
Team	Chassis	Engine	No.	Drivers	Rounds
(United States) JDC–Miller MotorSports	Porsche 963	Porsche 9RD 4.6 L Turbo V8	5	(Netherlands) Tijmen van der Helm	All
(United States) JDC–Miller MotorSports	Porsche 963	Porsche 9RD 4.6 L Turbo V8	5	(United States) Kaylen Frederick	1–2, 6, 8, 11
(United States) JDC–Miller MotorSports	Porsche 963	Porsche 9RD 4.6 L Turbo V8	5	(Germany) Laurin Heinrich	3–6, 8
(United States) JDC–Miller MotorSports	Porsche 963	Porsche 9RD 4.6 L Turbo V8	5	(Chile) Nico Pino	1–2
(United States) JDC–Miller MotorSports	Porsche 963	Porsche 9RD 4.6 L Turbo V8	5	(Switzerland) Nico Müller	10–11
(Germany) Porsche Penske Motorsport	Porsche 963	Porsche 9RD 4.6 L Turbo V8	6	(France) Kévin Estre	All
(Germany) Porsche Penske Motorsport	Porsche 963	Porsche 9RD 4.6 L Turbo V8	6	(Belgium) Laurens Vanthoor	1–6, 8, 11
(Germany) Porsche Penske Motorsport	Porsche 963	Porsche 9RD 4.6 L Turbo V8	6	(Australia) Matt Campbell	1–2, 11
(Germany) Porsche Penske Motorsport	Porsche 963	Porsche 9RD 4.6 L Turbo V8	6	(Germany) Laurin Heinrich	10
(Germany) Porsche Penske Motorsport	Porsche 963	Porsche 9RD 4.6 L Turbo V8	7	(France) Julien Andlauer	All
(Germany) Porsche Penske Motorsport	Porsche 963	Porsche 9RD 4.6 L Turbo V8	7	(Brazil) Felipe Nasr	All
(Germany) Porsche Penske Motorsport	Porsche 963	Porsche 9RD 4.6 L Turbo V8	7	(Germany) Laurin Heinrich	1–2, 11
(United States) Cadillac Wayne Taylor Racing	Cadillac V-Series.R	Cadillac LMC55R 5.5 L V8	10	(Portugal) Filipe Albuquerque	All
(United States) Cadillac Wayne Taylor Racing	Cadillac V-Series.R	Cadillac LMC55R 5.5 L V8	10	(United States) Ricky Taylor	All
(United States) Cadillac Wayne Taylor Racing	Cadillac V-Series.R	Cadillac LMC55R 5.5 L V8	10	(United Kingdom) Will Stevens	1–2, 11
(United States) Cadillac Wayne Taylor Racing	Cadillac V-Series.R	Cadillac LMC55R 5.5 L V8	40	(Switzerland) Louis Delétraz	All
(United States) Cadillac Wayne Taylor Racing	Cadillac V-Series.R	Cadillac LMC55R 5.5 L V8	40	(United States) Jordan Taylor	All
(United States) Cadillac Wayne Taylor Racing	Cadillac V-Series.R	Cadillac LMC55R 5.5 L V8	40	(United States) Colton Herta	1–2, 11
(United States) Aston Martin THOR Team	Aston Martin Valkyrie	Aston Martin RA 6.5 L V12	23	(Canada) Roman De Angelis	All
(United States) Aston Martin THOR Team	Aston Martin Valkyrie	Aston Martin RA 6.5 L V12	23	(United Kingdom) Ross Gunn	All
(United States) Aston Martin THOR Team	Aston Martin Valkyrie	Aston Martin RA 6.5 L V12	23	(Spain) Alex Riberas	1–2, 11
(United States) Aston Martin THOR Team	Aston Martin Valkyrie	Aston Martin RA 6.5 L V12	23	(Denmark) Marco Sørensen	1
(Belgium) BMW M Team WRT	BMW M Hybrid V8	BMW P66/3 4.0 L Turbo V8	24	(South Africa) Sheldon van der Linde	All
(Belgium) BMW M Team WRT	BMW M Hybrid V8	BMW P66/3 4.0 L Turbo V8	24	(Belgium) Dries Vanthoor	All
(Belgium) BMW M Team WRT	BMW M Hybrid V8	BMW P66/3 4.0 L Turbo V8	24	(Netherlands) Robin Frijns	1–2, 11
(Belgium) BMW M Team WRT	BMW M Hybrid V8	BMW P66/3 4.0 L Turbo V8	24	(Germany) René Rast	1
(Belgium) BMW M Team WRT	BMW M Hybrid V8	BMW P66/3 4.0 L Turbo V8	25	(Austria) Philipp Eng	All
(Belgium) BMW M Team WRT	BMW M Hybrid V8	BMW P66/3 4.0 L Turbo V8	25	(Germany) Marco Wittmann	All
(Belgium) BMW M Team WRT	BMW M Hybrid V8	BMW P66/3 4.0 L Turbo V8	25	(Denmark) Kevin Magnussen	1–2, 11
(Belgium) BMW M Team WRT	BMW M Hybrid V8	BMW P66/3 4.0 L Turbo V8	25	(Switzerland) Raffaele Marciello	1
(United States) Cadillac Whelen	Cadillac V-Series.R	Cadillac LMC55R 5.5 L V8	31	(United Kingdom) Jack Aitken	All
(United States) Cadillac Whelen	Cadillac V-Series.R	Cadillac LMC55R 5.5 L V8	31	(New Zealand) Earl Bamber	1–2, 4–6, 8, 10–11
(United States) Cadillac Whelen	Cadillac V-Series.R	Cadillac LMC55R 5.5 L V8	31	(Denmark) Frederik Vesti	1–3, 6, 8, 11
(United States) Cadillac Whelen	Cadillac V-Series.R	Cadillac LMC55R 5.5 L V8	31	(United States) Connor Zilisch	1
(United States) Acura Meyer Shank Racing with Curb-Agajanian	Acura ARX-06	Acura AR24e 2.4 L Turbo V6	60	(United Kingdom) Tom Blomqvist	All
(United States) Acura Meyer Shank Racing with Curb-Agajanian	Acura ARX-06	Acura AR24e 2.4 L Turbo V6	60	(United States) Colin Braun	All
(United States) Acura Meyer Shank Racing with Curb-Agajanian	Acura ARX-06	Acura AR24e 2.4 L Turbo V6	60	(New Zealand) Scott Dixon	1–2, 11
(United States) Acura Meyer Shank Racing with Curb-Agajanian	Acura ARX-06	Acura AR24e 2.4 L Turbo V6	60	(United States) A. J. Allmendinger	1
(United States) Acura Meyer Shank Racing with Curb-Agajanian	Acura ARX-06	Acura AR24e 2.4 L Turbo V6	93	(United Kingdom) Nick Yelloly	All
(United States) Acura Meyer Shank Racing with Curb-Agajanian	Acura ARX-06	Acura AR24e 2.4 L Turbo V6	93	(Netherlands) Renger van der Zande	All
(United States) Acura Meyer Shank Racing with Curb-Agajanian	Acura ARX-06	Acura AR24e 2.4 L Turbo V6	93	(Spain) Álex Palou	1–2, 11
(United States) Acura Meyer Shank Racing with Curb-Agajanian	Acura ARX-06	Acura AR24e 2.4 L Turbo V6	93	(Japan) Kakunoshin Ohta	1, 6

- Bryce Aron was provisionally listed at JDC–Miller MotorSports for the Rolex 24 at Daytona, but was later replaced by Kaylen Frederick.

=== Le Mans Prototype 2 (LMP2) ===
In accordance with the 2017 LMP2 regulations, all cars in the LMP2 class use the Gibson GK428 V8 engine.

Team	Chassis	No.	Drivers	Rounds
(United States) CrowdStrike Racing by APR	Oreca 07	04	(United States) George Kurtz	All
(United States) CrowdStrike Racing by APR	Oreca 07	04	(United Kingdom) Alex Quinn	All
(United States) CrowdStrike Racing by APR	Oreca 07	04	(United Kingdom) Toby Sowery	1–2, 6, 8, 11
(United States) CrowdStrike Racing by APR	Oreca 07	04	(Denmark) Malthe Jakobsen	1
(United States) United Autosports USA	Oreca 07	2	(Canada) Phil Fayer	All
(United States) United Autosports USA	Oreca 07	2	(Denmark) Mikkel Jensen	All
(United States) United Autosports USA	Oreca 07	2	(New Zealand) Hunter McElrea	1–2, 6, 8, 11
(United States) United Autosports USA	Oreca 07	2	(United Kingdom) Ben Hanley	1
(United States) United Autosports USA	Oreca 07	22	(United States) Dan Goldburg	All
(United States) United Autosports USA	Oreca 07	22	(United Kingdom) Paul di Resta	1–2, 6, 8, 10–11
(United States) United Autosports USA	Oreca 07	22	(Sweden) Rasmus Lindh	1–2, 6, 8, 11
(United States) United Autosports USA	Oreca 07	22	(Switzerland) Grégoire Saucy	1
(United States) United Autosports USA	Oreca 07	22	(United Kingdom) Ben Hanley	7
(Canada) Tower Motorsports	Oreca 07	8	(Canada) John Farano	All
(Canada) Tower Motorsports	Oreca 07	8	(Mexico) Sebastián Álvarez	1–2, 6–8, 11
(Canada) Tower Motorsports	Oreca 07	8	(France) Tristan Vautier	2, 6, 8, 10–11
(Canada) Tower Motorsports	Oreca 07	8	(France) Sébastien Bourdais	1
(Canada) Tower Motorsports	Oreca 07	8	(Cayman Islands) Kyffin Simpson	1
(France) TDS Racing	Oreca 07	11	(Canada) Tobias Lütke	All
(France) TDS Racing	Oreca 07	11	(Switzerland) Mathias Beche	1, 6–8, 10–11
(France) TDS Racing	Oreca 07	11	(Denmark) David Heinemeier Hansson	1–2, 6, 8, 11
(France) TDS Racing	Oreca 07	11	(France) Charles Milesi	1–2
(United States) Era Motorsport	Oreca 07	18	(United States) Jacob Abel	1–2, 6, 8, 11
(United States) Era Motorsport	Oreca 07	18	(Austria) Ferdinand Habsburg	1–2, 6, 8, 11
(United States) Era Motorsport	Oreca 07	18	(United States) Naveen Rao	1–2, 6, 8, 11
(United States) Era Motorsport	Oreca 07	18	(United States) Logan Sargeant	1
(United States) Era Motorsport	Oreca 07	18	(United States) Nick Boulle	10
(United States) Era Motorsport	Oreca 07	18	(Denmark) Christian Rasmussen	10
(United States) Intersport Racing	Oreca 07	37	(United States) Jon Field	1–2, 6, 8, 11
(United States) Intersport Racing	Oreca 07	37	(United Kingdom) Oliver Jarvis	1–2, 6, 8, 11
(United States) Intersport Racing	Oreca 07	37	(United States) Seth Lucas	1–2, 6
(United States) Intersport Racing	Oreca 07	37	(Netherlands) Max van der Snel	8, 11
(United States) Intersport Racing	Oreca 07	37	(Netherlands) Job van Uitert	1
(Poland) Inter Europol Competition	Oreca 07	43	(United States) Jeremy Clarke	All
(Poland) Inter Europol Competition	Oreca 07	43	(France) Tom Dillmann	All
(Poland) Inter Europol Competition	Oreca 07	43	(United States) Bijoy Garg	1–2, 6, 8, 11
(Poland) Inter Europol Competition	Oreca 07	43	(Portugal) António Félix da Costa	1
(Poland) Inter Europol Competition	Oreca 07	343	(New Zealand) Nick Cassidy	1
(Poland) Inter Europol Competition	Oreca 07	343	(Greece) Georgios Kolovos	1
(Poland) Inter Europol Competition	Oreca 07	343	(United States) Nolan Siegel	1
(Poland) Inter Europol Competition	Oreca 07	343	(Poland) Jakub Śmiechowski	1
(United States) Bryan Herta Autosport with PR1/Mathiasen	Oreca 07	52	(Canada) Misha Goikhberg	All
(United States) Bryan Herta Autosport with PR1/Mathiasen	Oreca 07	52	(United Kingdom) Harry Tincknell	1–2, 6, 8, 10–11
(United States) Bryan Herta Autosport with PR1/Mathiasen	Oreca 07	52	(Canada) Parker Thompson	1–2, 6, 8, 11
(United States) Bryan Herta Autosport with PR1/Mathiasen	Oreca 07	52	(United States) Ben Keating	1
(United States) Bryan Herta Autosport with PR1/Mathiasen	Oreca 07	52	(United States) Ricky Taylor	7
(United States) Pratt Miller Motorsports	Oreca 07	73	(Canada) Chris Cumming	All
(United States) Pratt Miller Motorsports	Oreca 07	73	(Brazil) Pietro Fittipaldi	All
(United States) Pratt Miller Motorsports	Oreca 07	73	(Portugal) Manuel Espírito Santo	1–2, 6, 8, 11
(United States) Pratt Miller Motorsports	Oreca 07	73	(Brazil) Enzo Fittipaldi	1
(United States) JDC–Miller MotorSports	Oreca 07	79	(Australia) Josh Burdon	2, 8
(United States) JDC–Miller MotorSports	Oreca 07	79	(United Kingdom) Sennan Fielding	2, 8
(United States) JDC–Miller MotorSports	Oreca 07	79	(United States) Gerry Kraut	2, 8
(Italy) AF Corse USA	Oreca 07	83	(United States) Dylan Murry	1
(Italy) AF Corse USA	Oreca 07	83	(Denmark) Nicklas Nielsen	1
(Italy) AF Corse USA	Oreca 07	83	(France) François Perrodo	1
(Italy) AF Corse USA	Oreca 07	83	(France) Matthieu Vaxivière	1
(United States) AO Racing	Oreca 07	99	(United States) Dane Cameron	All
(United States) AO Racing	Oreca 07	99	(United States) P. J. Hyett	All
(United States) AO Racing	Oreca 07	99	(United Kingdom) Jonny Edgar	1–2, 6, 8, 11
(United States) AO Racing	Oreca 07	99	(Denmark) Christian Rasmussen	1

- Tõnis Kasemets's Team Tonis was scheduled to field its No. 61 Oreca 07 full-time, but did not appear at any rounds.
- James Roe was provisionally listed at Era Motorsport for the Rolex 24 at Daytona, but later moved to Lone Star Racing's GTD entry. He was replaced by Jacob Abel.

=== GT Daytona (GTD Pro / GTD) ===
Team	Chassis	Engine	No.	Drivers	Rounds
GTD Pro
(United States) Triarsi Competizione	Ferrari 296 GT3 Evo	Ferrari F163CE 3.0 L Turbo V6	033	(Italy) Riccardo Agostini	1–2, 6, 8, 11
(United States) Triarsi Competizione	Ferrari 296 GT3 Evo	Ferrari F163CE 3.0 L Turbo V6	033	(United Kingdom) James Calado	1–2, 6, 8, 11
(United States) Triarsi Competizione	Ferrari 296 GT3 Evo	Ferrari F163CE 3.0 L Turbo V6	033	(Spain) Miguel Molina	1–2, 11
(United States) Triarsi Competizione	Ferrari 296 GT3 Evo	Ferrari F163CE 3.0 L Turbo V6	033	(Italy) Alessio Rovera	1
(United States) Paul Miller Racing	BMW M4 GT3 Evo	BMW P58 3.0 L Turbo I6	1	(United States) Connor De Phillippi	All
(United States) Paul Miller Racing	BMW M4 GT3 Evo	BMW P58 3.0 L Turbo I6	1	(United States) Neil Verhagen	All
(United States) Paul Miller Racing	BMW M4 GT3 Evo	BMW P58 3.0 L Turbo I6	1	(Germany) Max Hesse	1–2
(United States) Paul Miller Racing	BMW M4 GT3 Evo	BMW P58 3.0 L Turbo I6	1	(United Kingdom) Dan Harper	1, 11
(United States) Corvette Racing by Pratt Miller Motorsports	Chevrolet Corvette Z06 GT3.R	Chevrolet LT6.R 5.5 L V8	3	(Spain) Antonio García	All
(United States) Corvette Racing by Pratt Miller Motorsports	Chevrolet Corvette Z06 GT3.R	Chevrolet LT6.R 5.5 L V8	3	(United Kingdom) Alexander Sims	All
(United States) Corvette Racing by Pratt Miller Motorsports	Chevrolet Corvette Z06 GT3.R	Chevrolet LT6.R 5.5 L V8	3	(Germany) Marvin Kirchhöfer	1–2, 11
(United States) Corvette Racing by Pratt Miller Motorsports	Chevrolet Corvette Z06 GT3.R	Chevrolet LT6.R 5.5 L V8	4	(Netherlands) Nicky Catsburg	All
(United States) Corvette Racing by Pratt Miller Motorsports	Chevrolet Corvette Z06 GT3.R	Chevrolet LT6.R 5.5 L V8	4	(United States) Tommy Milner	All
(United States) Corvette Racing by Pratt Miller Motorsports	Chevrolet Corvette Z06 GT3.R	Chevrolet LT6.R 5.5 L V8	4	(Argentina) Nico Varrone	1–2, 11
(Canada) Pfaff Motorsports	Lamborghini Huracán GT3 Evo 2 1 Lamborghini Temerario GT3 2, 4–10	Lamborghini DGF 5.2 L V10; Lamborghini L411 4.0 L Turbo V8	9	(Italy) Andrea Caldarelli	All
(Canada) Pfaff Motorsports	Lamborghini Huracán GT3 Evo 2 1 Lamborghini Temerario GT3 2, 4–10	Lamborghini DGF 5.2 L V10; Lamborghini L411 4.0 L Turbo V8	9	(United Kingdom) Sandy Mitchell	All
(Canada) Pfaff Motorsports	Lamborghini Huracán GT3 Evo 2 1 Lamborghini Temerario GT3 2, 4–10	Lamborghini DGF 5.2 L V10; Lamborghini L411 4.0 L Turbo V8	9	(France) Franck Perera	2, 11
(Canada) Pfaff Motorsports	Lamborghini Huracán GT3 Evo 2 1 Lamborghini Temerario GT3 2, 4–10	Lamborghini DGF 5.2 L V10; Lamborghini L411 4.0 L Turbo V8	9	(Italy) Mirko Bortolotti	1
(Canada) Pfaff Motorsports	Lamborghini Huracán GT3 Evo 2 1 Lamborghini Temerario GT3 2, 4–10	Lamborghini DGF 5.2 L V10; Lamborghini L411 4.0 L Turbo V8	9	(Canada) James Hinchcliffe	1
(United States) Vasser Sullivan Racing (Note: Entered as Vasser Sullivan Racing with Dreyer & Reinbold at round 6 in tribute to Dennis Reinbold, who died of cancer two weeks prior.)	Lexus RC F GT3	Toyota 2UR-GSE 5.4 L V8	14	(United Kingdom) Ben Barnicoat	All
(United States) Vasser Sullivan Racing	Lexus RC F GT3	Toyota 2UR-GSE 5.4 L V8	14	(United Kingdom) Jack Hawksworth	All
(United States) Vasser Sullivan Racing	Lexus RC F GT3	Toyota 2UR-GSE 5.4 L V8	14	(United States) Kyle Kirkwood	1–2, 11
(United States) Vasser Sullivan Racing	Lexus RC F GT3	Toyota 2UR-GSE 5.4 L V8	15	(Australia) Chaz Mostert	5
(United States) Vasser Sullivan Racing	Lexus RC F GT3	Toyota 2UR-GSE 5.4 L V8	15	(United States) Aaron Telitz	5
(United States) Winward Racing	Mercedes-AMG GT3 Evo	Mercedes-AMG M159 6.2 L V8	48	(United States) Jason Hart	1–2
(United States) Winward Racing	Mercedes-AMG GT3 Evo	Mercedes-AMG M159 6.2 L V8	48	(United States) Scott Noble	1–2
(United States) Winward Racing	Mercedes-AMG GT3 Evo	Mercedes-AMG M159 6.2 L V8	48	(Germany) Luca Stolz	1–2
(United States) Winward Racing	Mercedes-AMG GT3 Evo	Mercedes-AMG M159 6.2 L V8	48	(Belgium) Maxime Martin	1
(United States) RLL Team McLaren	McLaren 720S GT3 Evo	McLaren M840T 4.0 L Turbo V8	59	(United States) Max Esterson	All
(United States) RLL Team McLaren	McLaren 720S GT3 Evo	McLaren M840T 4.0 L Turbo V8	59	(United States) Nikita Johnson	All
(United States) RLL Team McLaren	McLaren 720S GT3 Evo	McLaren M840T 4.0 L Turbo V8	59	(United Kingdom) Dean MacDonald	1–2
(United States) RLL Team McLaren	McLaren 720S GT3 Evo	McLaren M840T 4.0 L Turbo V8	59	(Estonia) Jüri Vips	1
(United States) RLL Team McLaren	McLaren 720S GT3 Evo	McLaren M840T 4.0 L Turbo V8	59	(Germany) Benjamin Goethe	11
(United States) Risi Competizione	Ferrari 296 GT3 Evo	Ferrari F163CE 3.0 L Turbo V6	62	(Italy) Davide Rigon	1–2, 6, 8, 11
(United States) Risi Competizione	Ferrari 296 GT3 Evo	Ferrari F163CE 3.0 L Turbo V6	62	(Brazil) Daniel Serra	1–2, 6, 8, 11
(United States) Risi Competizione	Ferrari 296 GT3 Evo	Ferrari F163CE 3.0 L Turbo V6	62	(Italy) Alessandro Pier Guidi	1–2, 11
(United States) Ford Racing	Ford Mustang GT3 Evo	Ford Coyote 5.4 L V8	64	(United Kingdom) Ben Barker	All
(United States) Ford Racing	Ford Mustang GT3 Evo	Ford Coyote 5.4 L V8	64	(Norway) Dennis Olsen	All
(United States) Ford Racing	Ford Mustang GT3 Evo	Ford Coyote 5.4 L V8	64	(Germany) Mike Rockenfeller	1–2, 11
(United States) Ford Racing	Ford Mustang GT3 Evo	Ford Coyote 5.4 L V8	65	(Germany) Christopher Mies	All
(United States) Ford Racing	Ford Mustang GT3 Evo	Ford Coyote 5.4 L V8	65	(Belgium) Frédéric Vervisch	All
(United States) Ford Racing	Ford Mustang GT3 Evo	Ford Coyote 5.4 L V8	65	(United Kingdom) Sebastian Priaulx	1–2, 11
(United States) Car Blanche	Aston Martin Vantage AMR GT3 Evo	Aston Martin AMR16A 4.0 L Turbo V8	68	(France) Valentin Hasse-Clot	7, 9–11
(United States) Car Blanche	Aston Martin Vantage AMR GT3 Evo	Aston Martin AMR16A 4.0 L Turbo V8	68	(Denmark) Marco Sørensen	9–11
(United States) Car Blanche	Aston Martin Vantage AMR GT3 Evo	Aston Martin AMR16A 4.0 L Turbo V8	68	(Australia) Scott Andrews	7
(United States) Car Blanche	Aston Martin Vantage AMR GT3 Evo	Aston Martin AMR16A 4.0 L Turbo V8	68	(Italy) Mattia Drudi	11
(Germany) Bartone Bros with GetSpeed	Mercedes-AMG GT3 Evo	Mercedes-AMG M159 6.2 L V8	69	(United States) Anthony Bartone	1
(Germany) Bartone Bros with GetSpeed	Mercedes-AMG GT3 Evo	Mercedes-AMG M159 6.2 L V8	69	(Germany) Maximilian Götz	1
(Germany) Bartone Bros with GetSpeed	Mercedes-AMG GT3 Evo	Mercedes-AMG M159 6.2 L V8	69	(Andorra) Jules Gounon	1
(Germany) Bartone Bros with GetSpeed	Mercedes-AMG GT3 Evo	Mercedes-AMG M159 6.2 L V8	69	(Germany) Fabian Schiller	1
(United States) DragonSpeed	Chevrolet Corvette Z06 GT3.R	Chevrolet LT6.R 5.5 L V8	74	(Italy) Giacomo Altoè	11
(United States) DragonSpeed	Chevrolet Corvette Z06 GT3.R	Chevrolet LT6.R 5.5 L V8	74	(France) Sébastien Bourdais	11
(United States) DragonSpeed	Chevrolet Corvette Z06 GT3.R	Chevrolet LT6.R 5.5 L V8	74	(United Kingdom) Casper Stevenson	11
(Australia) 75 Express	Mercedes-AMG GT3 Evo	Mercedes-AMG M159 6.2 L V8	75	(Germany) Maro Engel	1
(Australia) 75 Express	Mercedes-AMG GT3 Evo	Mercedes-AMG M159 6.2 L V8	75	(Australia) Kenny Habul	1
(Australia) 75 Express	Mercedes-AMG GT3 Evo	Mercedes-AMG M159 6.2 L V8	75	(Australia) Chaz Mostert	1
(Australia) 75 Express	Mercedes-AMG GT3 Evo	Mercedes-AMG M159 6.2 L V8	75	(Australia) Will Power	1
(United States) AO Racing	Porsche 911 GT3 R (992.2)	Porsche M97/80 4.2 L Flat-6	77	(United Kingdom) Harry King	All
(United States) AO Racing	Porsche 911 GT3 R (992.2)	Porsche M97/80 4.2 L Flat-6	77	(United Kingdom) Nick Tandy	All
(United States) AO Racing	Porsche 911 GT3 R (992.2)	Porsche M97/80 4.2 L Flat-6	77	(Belgium) Alessio Picariello	1–2, 11
(Germany) Manthey Racing	Porsche 911 GT3 R (992.2)	Porsche M97/80 4.2 L Flat-6	911	(Austria) Klaus Bachler	1–2, 6, 8, 11
(Germany) Manthey Racing	Porsche 911 GT3 R (992.2)	Porsche M97/80 4.2 L Flat-6	911	(Austria) Thomas Preining	1–2, 8, 11
(Germany) Manthey Racing	Porsche 911 GT3 R (992.2)	Porsche M97/80 4.2 L Flat-6	911	(Switzerland) Ricardo Feller	1–2
(Germany) Manthey Racing	Porsche 911 GT3 R (992.2)	Porsche M97/80 4.2 L Flat-6	911	(Turkey) Ayhancan Güven	1
(Germany) Manthey Racing	Porsche 911 GT3 R (992.2)	Porsche M97/80 4.2 L Flat-6	911	(Denmark) Michael Christensen	6
(Germany) Manthey Racing	Porsche 911 GT3 R (992.2)	Porsche M97/80 4.2 L Flat-6	911	(Netherlands) Loek Hartog	6
(Germany) Manthey Racing	Porsche 911 GT3 R (992.2)	Porsche M97/80 4.2 L Flat-6	911	(France) Mathieu Jaminet	11
GTD
(United States) Triarsi Competizione	Ferrari 296 GT3 Evo	Ferrari F163CE 3.0 L Turbo V6	023	(United States) Kenton Koch	1–2, 6, 8, 11
(United States) Triarsi Competizione	Ferrari 296 GT3 Evo	Ferrari F163CE 3.0 L Turbo V6	023	(United States) Robert Megennis	1–2, 6, 8, 11
(United States) Triarsi Competizione	Ferrari 296 GT3 Evo	Ferrari F163CE 3.0 L Turbo V6	023	(United States) Onofrio Triarsi	1–2, 6, 8, 11
(United States) Triarsi Competizione	Ferrari 296 GT3 Evo	Ferrari F163CE 3.0 L Turbo V6	023	(China) Yifei Ye	1
(United States) Car Blanche	Aston Martin Vantage AMR GT3 Evo	Aston Martin AMR16A 4.0 L Turbo V8	068	(United States) Trenton Estep	6, 8
(United States) Car Blanche	Aston Martin Vantage AMR GT3 Evo	Aston Martin AMR16A 4.0 L Turbo V8	068	(France) Marius Fossard	6, 8
(United States) Car Blanche	Aston Martin Vantage AMR GT3 Evo	Aston Martin AMR16A 4.0 L Turbo V8	068	(France) Valentin Hasse-Clot	6, 8
(United States) Vasser Sullivan Racing	Lexus RC F GT3	Toyota 2UR-GSE 5.4 L V8	12	(Denmark) Benjamin Pedersen	All
(United States) Vasser Sullivan Racing	Lexus RC F GT3	Toyota 2UR-GSE 5.4 L V8	12	(United States) Aaron Telitz	All
(United States) Vasser Sullivan Racing	Lexus RC F GT3	Toyota 2UR-GSE 5.4 L V8	12	(United States) Frankie Montecalvo	1–2, 6, 8, 11
(United States) Vasser Sullivan Racing	Lexus RC F GT3	Toyota 2UR-GSE 5.4 L V8	12	(France) Esteban Masson	1
(United States) Vasser Sullivan Racing	Lexus RC F GT3	Toyota 2UR-GSE 5.4 L V8	89	(United Kingdom) Jack Hawksworth	3
(United States) Vasser Sullivan Racing	Lexus RC F GT3	Toyota 2UR-GSE 5.4 L V8	89	(United States) Frankie Montecalvo	3
(Canada) 13 Autosport	Chevrolet Corvette Z06 GT3.R	Chevrolet LT6.R 5.5 L V8	13	(United Kingdom) Matt Bell	All
(Canada) 13 Autosport	Chevrolet Corvette Z06 GT3.R	Chevrolet LT6.R 5.5 L V8	13	(Canada) Orey Fidani	All
(Canada) 13 Autosport	Chevrolet Corvette Z06 GT3.R	Chevrolet LT6.R 5.5 L V8	13	(Germany) Lars Kern	1–2, 6, 8, 11
(Canada) 13 Autosport	Chevrolet Corvette Z06 GT3.R	Chevrolet LT6.R 5.5 L V8	13	(United Kingdom) Ben Green	1
(United States) Myers Riley Motorsports	Ford Mustang GT3 Evo	Ford Coyote 5.4 L V8	16	(Brazil) Felipe Fraga	All
(United States) Myers Riley Motorsports	Ford Mustang GT3 Evo	Ford Coyote 5.4 L V8	16	(United States) Sheena Monk	All
(United States) Myers Riley Motorsports	Ford Mustang GT3 Evo	Ford Coyote 5.4 L V8	16	(United States) Jenson Altzman	1–2, 6, 8, 11
(United States) Myers Riley Motorsports	Ford Mustang GT3 Evo	Ford Coyote 5.4 L V8	16	(France) Romain Grosjean	1
(United States) van der Steur Racing	Aston Martin Vantage AMR GT3 Evo	Aston Martin AMR16A 4.0 L Turbo V8	19	(United States) Rory van der Steur	1–4
(United States) van der Steur Racing	Aston Martin Vantage AMR GT3 Evo	Aston Martin AMR16A 4.0 L Turbo V8	19	(France) Valentin Hasse-Clot	1–3
(United States) van der Steur Racing	Aston Martin Vantage AMR GT3 Evo	Aston Martin AMR16A 4.0 L Turbo V8	19	(France) Sébastien Baud	1–2
(United States) van der Steur Racing	Aston Martin Vantage AMR GT3 Evo	Aston Martin AMR16A 4.0 L Turbo V8	19	(Thailand) Carl Bennett	1
(United States) van der Steur Racing	Aston Martin Vantage AMR GT3 Evo	Aston Martin AMR16A 4.0 L Turbo V8	19	(Australia) Scott Andrews	4
(Italy) AF Corse USA	Ferrari 296 GT3 Evo	Ferrari F163CE 3.0 L Turbo V6	21	(Italy) Antonio Fuoco	1–2, 6, 8, 11
(Italy) AF Corse USA	Ferrari 296 GT3 Evo	Ferrari F163CE 3.0 L Turbo V6	21	(United States) Simon Mann	1–2, 6, 8, 11
(Italy) AF Corse USA	Ferrari 296 GT3 Evo	Ferrari F163CE 3.0 L Turbo V6	21	(France) Lilou Wadoux	1–2, 8, 11
(Italy) AF Corse USA	Ferrari 296 GT3 Evo	Ferrari F163CE 3.0 L Turbo V6	21	(Italy) Tommaso Mosca	1
(Italy) AF Corse USA	Ferrari 296 GT3 Evo	Ferrari F163CE 3.0 L Turbo V6	21	(United States) Alec Udell	6
(United States) Heart of Racing Team	Aston Martin Vantage AMR GT3 Evo	Aston Martin AMR16A 4.0 L Turbo V8	27	(Brazil) Eduardo Barrichello	All
(United States) Heart of Racing Team	Aston Martin Vantage AMR GT3 Evo	Aston Martin AMR16A 4.0 L Turbo V8	27	(United Kingdom) Tom Gamble	1–2, 4, 6, 8–11
(United States) Heart of Racing Team	Aston Martin Vantage AMR GT3 Evo	Aston Martin AMR16A 4.0 L Turbo V8	27	(Canada) Zacharie Robichon	1–2, 6, 8, 11
(United States) Heart of Racing Team	Aston Martin Vantage AMR GT3 Evo	Aston Martin AMR16A 4.0 L Turbo V8	27	(Italy) Mattia Drudi	1
(United States) Heart of Racing Team	Aston Martin Vantage AMR GT3 Evo	Aston Martin AMR16A 4.0 L Turbo V8	27	(United States) Spencer Pumpelly	3
(United States) Heart of Racing Team	Aston Martin Vantage AMR GT3 Evo	Aston Martin AMR16A 4.0 L Turbo V8	27	(Canada) Roman De Angelis	7
(United States) RS1	Porsche 911 GT3 R (992.2)	Porsche M97/80 4.2 L Flat-6	28	(Belgium) Jan Heylen	1–2, 6, 8, 11
(United States) RS1	Porsche 911 GT3 R (992.2)	Porsche M97/80 4.2 L Flat-6	28	(United States) Dillon Machavern	1–2, 6
(United States) RS1	Porsche 911 GT3 R (992.2)	Porsche M97/80 4.2 L Flat-6	28	(New Zealand) Ryan Yardley	8, 11
(United States) RS1	Porsche 911 GT3 R (992.2)	Porsche M97/80 4.2 L Flat-6	28	(Germany) Sven Müller	1
(United States) RS1	Porsche 911 GT3 R (992.2)	Porsche M97/80 4.2 L Flat-6	28	(United States) Eric Zitza	1
(United States) RS1	Porsche 911 GT3 R (992.2)	Porsche M97/80 4.2 L Flat-6	28	(United States) Spencer Pumpelly	2
(United States) RS1	Porsche 911 GT3 R (992.2)	Porsche M97/80 4.2 L Flat-6	28	(United States) Eric Lux	6
(United States) RS1	Porsche 911 GT3 R (992.2)	Porsche M97/80 4.2 L Flat-6	28	(Canada) Devlin DeFrancesco	8
(United States) RS1	Porsche 911 GT3 R (992.2)	Porsche M97/80 4.2 L Flat-6	28	(Canada) Zachary Vanier	11
(United States) Conquest Racing	Ferrari 296 GT3 Evo	Ferrari F163CE 3.0 L Turbo V6	34	(Spain) Albert Costa	All
(United States) Conquest Racing	Ferrari 296 GT3 Evo	Ferrari F163CE 3.0 L Turbo V6	34	(Italy) Lorenzo Patrese	1–2, 4, 6–11
(United States) Conquest Racing	Ferrari 296 GT3 Evo	Ferrari F163CE 3.0 L Turbo V6	34	(United States) Manny Franco	1–3
(United States) Conquest Racing	Ferrari 296 GT3 Evo	Ferrari F163CE 3.0 L Turbo V6	34	(Spain) Fran Rueda	6, 8
(United States) Conquest Racing	Ferrari 296 GT3 Evo	Ferrari F163CE 3.0 L Turbo V6	34	(Netherlands) Thierry Vermeulen	1
(United States) Conquest Racing	Ferrari 296 GT3 Evo	Ferrari F163CE 3.0 L Turbo V6	34	(United States) Alec Udell	11
(United States) DXDT Racing	Chevrolet Corvette Z06 GT3.R	Chevrolet LT6.R 5.5 L V8	36	(United States) Mason Filippi	1–3, 6–11
(United States) DXDT Racing	Chevrolet Corvette Z06 GT3.R	Chevrolet LT6.R 5.5 L V8	36	(Republic of Ireland) Charlie Eastwood	1–2, 6, 8, 11
(United States) DXDT Racing	Chevrolet Corvette Z06 GT3.R	Chevrolet LT6.R 5.5 L V8	36	(Canada) Robert Wickens	3, 7–10
(United States) DXDT Racing	Chevrolet Corvette Z06 GT3.R	Chevrolet LT6.R 5.5 L V8	36	(Turkey) Salih Yoluç	1–2, 6, 11
(United States) DXDT Racing	Chevrolet Corvette Z06 GT3.R	Chevrolet LT6.R 5.5 L V8	36	(New Zealand) Scott McLaughlin	1
(United States) Magnus Racing	Aston Martin Vantage AMR GT3 Evo	Aston Martin AMR16A 4.0 L Turbo V8	44	(United States) John Potter	1, 6, 11
(United States) Magnus Racing	Aston Martin Vantage AMR GT3 Evo	Aston Martin AMR16A 4.0 L Turbo V8	44	(United States) Spencer Pumpelly	1, 6, 11
(United States) Magnus Racing	Aston Martin Vantage AMR GT3 Evo	Aston Martin AMR16A 4.0 L Turbo V8	44	(Germany) Mario Farnbacher	6, 11
(United States) Magnus Racing	Aston Martin Vantage AMR GT3 Evo	Aston Martin AMR16A 4.0 L Turbo V8	44	(United States) Madison Snow	1
(United States) Magnus Racing	Aston Martin Vantage AMR GT3 Evo	Aston Martin AMR16A 4.0 L Turbo V8	44	(Denmark) Nicki Thiim	1
(United States) Wayne Taylor Racing	Lamborghini Huracán GT3 Evo 2	Lamborghini DGF 5.2 L V10	45	(Costa Rica) Danny Formal	All
(United States) Wayne Taylor Racing	Lamborghini Huracán GT3 Evo 2	Lamborghini DGF 5.2 L V10	45	(United States) Trent Hindman	All
(United States) Wayne Taylor Racing	Lamborghini Huracán GT3 Evo 2	Lamborghini DGF 5.2 L V10	45	(United States) Graham Doyle	1–2, 6, 8, 11
(United States) Wayne Taylor Racing	Lamborghini Huracán GT3 Evo 2	Lamborghini DGF 5.2 L V10	45	(Sweden) Marcus Ericsson	1
(Canada) Pfaff Motorsports	Lamborghini Temerario GT3	Lamborghini L411 4.0 L Turbo V8	46	(Italy) Andrea Caldarelli	3
(Canada) Pfaff Motorsports	Lamborghini Temerario GT3	Lamborghini L411 4.0 L Turbo V8	46	(Canada) Zachary Vanier	3
(United States) Winward Racing	Mercedes-AMG GT3 Evo	Mercedes-AMG M159 6.2 L V8	57	(Switzerland) Philip Ellis	All
(United States) Winward Racing	Mercedes-AMG GT3 Evo	Mercedes-AMG M159 6.2 L V8	57	(United States) Russell Ward	All
(United States) Winward Racing	Mercedes-AMG GT3 Evo	Mercedes-AMG M159 6.2 L V8	57	(Netherlands) Indy Dontje	1–2, 6, 8, 11
(United States) Winward Racing	Mercedes-AMG GT3 Evo	Mercedes-AMG M159 6.2 L V8	57	(Austria) Lucas Auer	1
(United States) Gradient Racing	Ford Mustang GT3 Evo	Ford Coyote 5.4 L V8	66	(United States) Jake Walker	All
(United States) Gradient Racing	Ford Mustang GT3 Evo	Ford Coyote 5.4 L V8	66	(United States) Corey Lewis	1, 3–4, 6–7, 9–10
(United States) Gradient Racing	Ford Mustang GT3 Evo	Ford Coyote 5.4 L V8	66	(United Kingdom) Till Bechtolsheimer	1–2, 6, 8, 11
(United States) Gradient Racing	Ford Mustang GT3 Evo	Ford Coyote 5.4 L V8	66	(United States) Joey Hand	1–2, 8, 11
(United Kingdom) Inception Racing	Ferrari 296 GT3 Evo	Ferrari F163CE 3.0 L Turbo V6	70	(United States) Brendan Iribe	All
(United Kingdom) Inception Racing	Ferrari 296 GT3 Evo	Ferrari F163CE 3.0 L Turbo V6	70	(Denmark) Frederik Schandorff	1–4, 7–11
(United Kingdom) Inception Racing	Ferrari 296 GT3 Evo	Ferrari F163CE 3.0 L Turbo V6	70	(United Kingdom) Ollie Millroy	1–2, 6, 8
(United Kingdom) Inception Racing	Ferrari 296 GT3 Evo	Ferrari F163CE 3.0 L Turbo V6	70	(Italy) David Fumanelli	1
(United Kingdom) Inception Racing	Ferrari 296 GT3 Evo	Ferrari F163CE 3.0 L Turbo V6	70	(New Zealand) Jaxon Evans	6
(United Kingdom) Inception Racing	Ferrari 296 GT3 Evo	Ferrari F163CE 3.0 L Turbo V6	70	(Spain) Fran Rueda	11
(United States) Lone Star Racing	Mercedes-AMG GT3 Evo	Mercedes-AMG M159 6.2 L V8	80	(Netherlands) Lin Hodenius	1–2, 6, 8, 11
(United States) Lone Star Racing	Mercedes-AMG GT3 Evo	Mercedes-AMG M159 6.2 L V8	80	(Republic of Ireland) James Roe	1–2, 6, 8, 11
(United States) Lone Star Racing	Mercedes-AMG GT3 Evo	Mercedes-AMG M159 6.2 L V8	80	(Australia) Scott Andrews	1–2, 6, 8
(United States) Lone Star Racing	Mercedes-AMG GT3 Evo	Mercedes-AMG M159 6.2 L V8	80	(Estonia) Ralf Aron	1
(United States) Lone Star Racing	Mercedes-AMG GT3 Evo	Mercedes-AMG M159 6.2 L V8	80	(Germany) Luca Stolz	11
(United States) DragonSpeed	Chevrolet Corvette Z06 GT3.R	Chevrolet LT6.R 5.5 L V8	81	(Italy) Giacomo Altoè	1–4, 6–10
(United States) DragonSpeed	Chevrolet Corvette Z06 GT3.R	Chevrolet LT6.R 5.5 L V8	81	(United Kingdom) Casper Stevenson	1–2, 6–10
(United States) DragonSpeed	Chevrolet Corvette Z06 GT3.R	Chevrolet LT6.R 5.5 L V8	81	(Sweden) Henrik Hedman	1–4, 6
(United States) DragonSpeed	Chevrolet Corvette Z06 GT3.R	Chevrolet LT6.R 5.5 L V8	81	(Italy) Matteo Cairoli	1
(United States) DragonSpeed	Chevrolet Corvette Z06 GT3.R	Chevrolet LT6.R 5.5 L V8	81	(United States) Alec Udell	8
(United States) Turner Motorsport	BMW M4 GT3 Evo	BMW P58 3.0 L Turbo I6	96	(United States) Robby Foley	All
(United States) Turner Motorsport	BMW M4 GT3 Evo	BMW P58 3.0 L Turbo I6	96	(United States) Patrick Gallagher	All
(United States) Turner Motorsport	BMW M4 GT3 Evo	BMW P58 3.0 L Turbo I6	96	(United States) Francis Selldorff	1–2, 6, 8, 11
(United States) Turner Motorsport	BMW M4 GT3 Evo	BMW P58 3.0 L Turbo I6	96	(Germany) Jens Klingmann	1
(United States) Wright Motorsports	Porsche 911 GT3 R (992.2)	Porsche M97/80 4.2 L Flat-6	120	(United States) Adam Adelson	All
(United States) Wright Motorsports	Porsche 911 GT3 R (992.2)	Porsche M97/80 4.2 L Flat-6	120	(United Kingdom) Callum Ilott	All
(United States) Wright Motorsports	Porsche 911 GT3 R (992.2)	Porsche M97/80 4.2 L Flat-6	120	(Australia) Tom Sargent	1–2, 6, 8, 11
(United States) Wright Motorsports	Porsche 911 GT3 R (992.2)	Porsche M97/80 4.2 L Flat-6	120	(United States) Elliott Skeer	1
(Belgium) Mühlner Motorsport	Porsche 911 GT3 R (992.2)	Porsche M97/80 4.2 L Flat-6	123	(United States) Peter Ludwig	1
(Belgium) Mühlner Motorsport	Porsche 911 GT3 R (992.2)	Porsche M97/80 4.2 L Flat-6	123	(United States) Dave Musial	1
(Belgium) Mühlner Motorsport	Porsche 911 GT3 R (992.2)	Porsche M97/80 4.2 L Flat-6	123	(United States) Dave Musial Jr.	1
(Belgium) Mühlner Motorsport	Porsche 911 GT3 R (992.2)	Porsche M97/80 4.2 L Flat-6	123	(New Zealand) Ryan Yardley	1
(United States) AO Racing	Porsche 911 GT3 R (992.2)	Porsche M97/80 4.2 L Flat-6	177	(United Kingdom) Harry King	3
(United States) AO Racing	Porsche 911 GT3 R (992.2)	Porsche M97/80 4.2 L Flat-6	177	(Denmark) Mikkel O. Pedersen	3
(Germany) Manthey 1st Phorm	Porsche 911 GT3 R (992.2)	Porsche M97/80 4.2 L Flat-6	912	(United States) Ryan Hardwick	1–2, 6, 8, 11
(Germany) Manthey 1st Phorm	Porsche 911 GT3 R (992.2)	Porsche M97/80 4.2 L Flat-6	912	(Italy) Riccardo Pera	1–2, 6, 8, 11
(Germany) Manthey 1st Phorm	Porsche 911 GT3 R (992.2)	Porsche M97/80 4.2 L Flat-6	912	(Netherlands) Morris Schuring	1–2, 8, 11
(Germany) Manthey 1st Phorm	Porsche 911 GT3 R (992.2)	Porsche M97/80 4.2 L Flat-6	912	(Austria) Richard Lietz	1, 6

== Race results ==
Bold indicates overall and GTD winners.

Rnd	Circuit	GTP Winning Team	LMP2 Winning Team	GTD Pro Winning Team	GTD Winning Team	Report
Rnd	Circuit	GTP Winning Drivers	LMP2 Winning Drivers	GTD Pro Winning Drivers	GTD Winning Drivers	Report
1	Daytona	**(Germany) #7 Porsche Penske Motorsport**	(United States) #04 CrowdStrike Racing by APR	**(United States) #1 Paul Miller Racing**	(United States) #57 Winward Racing	Report
1	Daytona	**(France) Julien Andlauer** **(Germany) Laurin Heinrich** **(Brazil) Felipe Nasr**	(Denmark) Malthe Jakobsen (United States) George Kurtz (United Kingdom) Alex Quinn (United Kingdom) Toby Sowery	**(United States) Connor De Phillippi** **(United Kingdom) Dan Harper** **(Germany) Max Hesse** **(United States) Neil Verhagen**	(Austria) Lucas Auer (Netherlands) Indy Dontje (Switzerland) Philip Ellis (United States) Russell Ward	Report
2	Sebring	**(Germany) #7 Porsche Penske Motorsport**	(United States) #2 United Autosports USA	**(Germany) #911 Manthey Racing**	(Italy) #21 AF Corse USA	Report
2	Sebring	**(France) Julien Andlauer** **(Germany) Laurin Heinrich** **(Brazil) Felipe Nasr**	(Canada) Phil Fayer (Denmark) Mikkel Jensen (New Zealand) Hunter McElrea	**(Austria) Klaus Bachler** **(Switzerland) Ricardo Feller** **(Austria) Thomas Preining**	(Italy) Antonio Fuoco (United States) Simon Mann (France) Lilou Wadoux	Report
3	Long Beach	(United States) **#93 Acura Meyer Shank Racing with Curb-Agajanian**	did not participate	did not participate	(United States) **#12 Vasser Sullivan Racing**	Report
3	Long Beach	(United Kingdom) **Nick Yelloly** (Netherlands) **Renger van der Zande**	did not participate	did not participate	(Denmark) **Benjamin Pedersen** (United States) **Aaron Telitz**	Report
4	Laguna Seca	**(United States) #5 JDC-Miller MotorSports**	did not participate	**(United States) #65 Ford Racing**	(United States) #45 Wayne Taylor Racing	Report
4	Laguna Seca	**(Germany) Laurin Heinrich** **(Netherlands) Tijmen van der Helm**	did not participate	**(Germany) Christopher Mies** **(Belgium) Frédéric Vervisch**	(Costa Rica) Danny Formal (United States) Trent Hindman	Report
5	Detroit	**(United States) #31 Cadillac Whelen**	did not participate	**(United States) #3 Corvette Racing by Pratt Miller Motorsports**	did not participate	Report
5	Detroit	**(United Kingdom) Jack Aitken** **(New Zealand) Earl Bamber**	did not participate	**(Spain) Antonio García** **(United Kingdom) Alexander Sims**	did not participate	Report
6	Watkins Glen	**(United States) #31 Cadillac Whelen**	(United States) #99 AO Racing	**(United States) #14 Vasser Sullivan Racing with Dreyer & Reinbold**	(Germany) #912 Manthey 1st Phorm	Report
6	Watkins Glen	**(United Kingdom) Jack Aitken** **(New Zealand) Earl Bamber** **(Denmark) Frederik Vesti**	(United States) Dane Cameron (United Kingdom) Jonny Edgar (United States) P.J. Hyett	**(United Kingdom) Ben Barnicoat** **(United Kingdom) Jack Hawksworth**	(United States) Ryan Hardwick (Italy) Riccardo Pera (Austria) Richard Lietz	Report
7	Mosport	did not participate	**(Poland) #43 Inter Europol Competition**	**(United States) #14 Vasser Sullivan Racing**	(United States) #57 Winward Racing	Report
7	Mosport	did not participate	**(United States) Jeremy Clarke** **(France) Tom Dillmann**	**(United Kingdom) Ben Barnicoat** **(United Kingdom) Jack Hawksworth**	(Switzerland) Philip Ellis (United States) Russell Ward	Report
8	Road America	**(United States) #10 Cadillac Wayne Taylor Racing**	(Poland) #43 Inter Europol Competition	**(Canada) #9 Pfaff Motorsports**	(United States) #57 Winward Racing	Report
8	Road America	**(Portugal) Filipe Albuquerque** **(United States) Ricky Taylor**	(United States) Jeremy Clarke (France) Tom Dillmann (United States) Bijoy Garg	**(Italy) Andrea Caldarelli** **(United Kingdom) Sandy Mitchell**	(Netherlands) Indy Dontje (Switzerland) Philip Ellis (United States) Russell Ward	Report
9	Virginia	did not participate	did not participate	**(Canada) #9 Pfaff Motorsports**	(United States) #57 Winward Racing	Report
9	Virginia	did not participate	did not participate	**(Italy) Andrea Caldarelli** **(United Kingdom) Sandy Mitchell**	(Switzerland) Philip Ellis (United States) Russell Ward	Report
10	Indianapolis	**(Belgium) #24 BMW M Team WRT**	(United States) #18 Era Motorsport	**(United States) #64 Ford Racing**	(United States) #96 Turner Motorsport	Report
10	Indianapolis	**(South Africa) Sheldon van der Linde** **(Belgium) Dries Vanthoor**	(United States) Nick Boulle (Denmark) Christian Rasmussen	**(United Kingdom) Ben Barker** **(Norway) Dennis Olsen**	(United States) Robby Foley (United States) Patrick Gallagher	Report
11	Road Atlanta	**(Germany) #6 Porsche Penske Motorsport**	(United States) #04 CrowdStrike Racing by APR	**(United States) #68 Car Blanche**	(United States) #57 Winward Racing	Report
11	Road Atlanta	**(Australia) Matt Campbell** **(France) Kévin Estre** **(Belgium) Laurens Vanthoor**	(United States) George Kurtz (United Kingdom) Alex Quinn (United Kingdom) Toby Sowery	**(Italy) Mattia Drudi** **(France) Valentin Hasse-Clot** **(Denmark) Marco Sørensen**	(Netherlands) Indy Dontje (Switzerland) Philip Ellis (United States) Russell Ward	Report

== Championship standings ==
=== Points systems ===
Championship points are awarded in each class at the finish of each event. Points are awarded based on finishing positions in qualifying and the race as shown in the chart below.

Position	1	2	3	4	5	6	7	8	9	10	11	12	13	14	15	16	17	18	19	20	21	22	23	24	25	26	27	28	29	30+
Qualifying	35	32	30	28	26	25	24	23	22	21	20	19	18	17	16	15	14	13	12	11	10	9	8	7	6	5	4	3	2	1
Race	350	320	300	280	260	250	240	230	220	210	200	190	180	170	160	150	140	130	120	110	100	90	80	70	60	50	40	30	20	10

Drivers points

Points are awarded in each class at the finish of each event.

Team points

Team points are calculated in exactly the same way as driver points, using the point distribution chart. Each car entered is considered its own "team" regardless if it is a single entry or part of a two-car team.

Manufacturer points

There are also a number of manufacturer championships which utilize the same season-long point distribution chart. The manufacturer championships recognized by IMSA are as follows:

Grand Touring Prototype (GTP): Engine & bodywork manufacturer
GT Daytona Pro (GTD Pro): Car manufacturer
GT Daytona (GTD): Car manufacturer

Each manufacturer receives finishing points for its highest finishing car in each class. The positions of subsequent finishing cars from the same manufacturer are not taken into consideration, and all other manufacturers move up in the order.

Example: Manufacturer A finishes 1st and 2nd at an event, and Manufacturer B finishes 3rd. Manufacturer A receives 350 points for first place while Manufacturer B would earn 320 points for second place.

Michelin Endurance Cup

The points system for the Michelin Endurance Cup is different from the normal points system. Points are awarded on a 5–4–3–2 basis for drivers, teams and manufacturers. The first finishing position at each interval earns five points, four points for second position, three points for third, with two points awarded for fourth and each subsequent finishing position.

Position	1	2	3	Other Classified
Race	5	4	3	2

At the Rolex 24 at Daytona, points are awarded at 6 hours, 12 hours, 18 hours and at the finish. At the Sebring 12 hours, points are awarded at 4 hours, 8 hours and at the finish. At the Watkins Glen 6 hours and Road America 6 hours, points are awarded at 3 hours and at the finish. At the Petit Le Mans (10 hours), points are awarded at 4 hours, 8 hours and at the finish.

Like the season-long team championship, Michelin Endurance Cup team points are awarded for each car and drivers get points in any car that they drive, in which they are entered for points. The manufacturer points go to the highest placed car from that manufacturer (the others from that manufacturer not being counted), just like the season-long manufacturer championship.

For example: in any particular segment manufacturer A finishes 1st and 2nd and manufacturer B finishes 3rd. Manufacturer A only receives first-place points for that segment. Manufacturer B receives the second-place points.

=== Drivers' Championships ===
==== Standings: Grand Touring Prototype (GTP) ====
Pos.	Drivers	DAY	SEB	LBH	LGA	DET	WGL	ELK	IMS	ATL	Points	MEC
1	(United Kingdom) Jack Aitken	2	**3**	2	2	**1**	**1**	8	2	7	3020	43
2	(Germany) Laurin Heinrich	1	1	6	1	11	3	2	3	8	2859	54
3	(United Kingdom) Nick Yelloly (Netherlands) Renger van der Zande	**5**	6	**1**	5	4	2	**4**	7	10	2723	34
4	(France) Kévin Estre	4	2	3	6	8	6	10	3	1	2709	43
5	(New Zealand) Earl Bamber	2	**3**		2	**1**	**1**	8	2	7	2672	43
6	(South Africa) Sheldon van der Linde (Belgium) Dries Vanthoor	3	5	5	9	9	4	11	1	2	2650	36
7	(France) Julien Andlauer (Brazil) Felipe Nasr	1	1	4	7	5	5	6	11	8	2638	54
8	(Switzerland) Louis Delétraz (United States) Jordan Taylor	6	7	8	**10**	6	8	3	4	3	2556	31
9	(Netherlands) Tijmen van der Helm	7	8	6	1	11	3	2	9	9	2525	31
10	(United Kingdom) Tom Blomqvist (United States) Colin Braun	9	4	7	4	7	10	9	**5**	**6**	2465	31
11	(Portugal) Filipe Albuquerque (United States) Ricky Taylor	11	11	10	11	3	7	1	6	4	2448	32
12	(Belgium) Laurens Vanthoor	4	2	3	6	8	6	10		1	2386	43
13	(Austria) Philipp Eng (Germany) Marco Wittmann	8	10	11	3	2	9	7	10	11	2338	29
14	(Canada) Roman De Angelis (United Kingdom) Ross Gunn	10	9	9	8	10	11	5	8	5	2242	28
15	(Denmark) Frederik Vesti	2	**3**	2			**1**	8		7	1931	43
16	(United States) Kaylen Frederick	7	8				3	2		9	1424	31
17	(Australia) Matt Campbell	4	2							1	1030	33
18	(Netherlands) Robin Frijns	3	5							2	956	27
19	(United States) Colton Herta	6	7							3	873	21
20	(New Zealand) Scott Dixon	9	4							**6**	845	23
21	(Spain) Álex Palou	**5**	6							10	809	22
22	(United Kingdom) Will Stevens	11	11							4	756	21
23	(Spain) Alex Riberas	10	9							5	755	20
24	(Denmark) Kevin Magnussen	8	10							11	704	21
25	(Japan) Kakunoshin Ohta	**5**					2				643	18
26	(Chile) Nico Pino	7	8								518	14
27	(Switzerland) Nico Müller								9	9	480	6
28	(United States) Connor Zilisch	2									340	12
29	(Germany) René Rast	3									323	10
30	(Switzerland) Raffaele Marciello	8									252	9
31	(United States) A. J. Allmendinger	9									248	8
32	(Denmark) Marco Sørensen	10									231	8
Pos.	Drivers	DAY	SEB	LBH	LGA	DET	WGL	ELK	IMS	ATL	Points	MEC

Colour	Result
Gold	Winner
Silver	Second place
Bronze	Third place
Green	Points classification
Blue	Non-points classification
Blue	Non-classified finish (NC)
Purple	Retired, not classified (Ret)
Red	Did not qualify (DNQ)
Red	Did not pre-qualify (DNPQ)
Black	Disqualified (DSQ)
White	Did not start (DNS)
White	Withdrew (WD)
White	Race cancelled (C)
Blank	Did not practice (DNP)
Blank	Did not arrive (DNA)
Blank	Excluded (EX)

**Bold** - Pole position
Italics - Fastest lap

==== Standings: Le Mans Prototype 2 (LMP2) ====
Pos.	Drivers	DAY	SEB	WGL	MOS	ELK	IMS	ATL	Points	MEC
1	(United States) George Kurtz (United Kingdom) Alex Quinn	1	5	2	2	2	9	1	2322	52
2	(United States) Jeremy Clarke (France) Tom Dillmann	**2**	11	**4**	**1**	1	**6**	2	2302	40
3	(United States) Dan Goldburg	4	2	5	5	**7**	3	6	2127	35
4	(United States) Dane Cameron (United States) P.J. Hyett	5	6	1	3	4	8	**10**	2087	47
5	(Canada) Misha Goikhberg	6	**8**	6	4	6	2	8	2021	32
6	(Canada) John Farano	8	3	7	8	5	4	4	1967	35
7	(United Kingdom) Paul di Resta	4	2	5		7	3	6	1837	35
8	(Canada) Phil Fayer (Denmark) Mikkel Jensen	10	1	9	7	9	10	9	1835	33
9	(Canada) Chris Cumming (Brazil) Pietro Fittipaldi	11	9	8	6	11	5	5	1782	28
10	(Canada) Tobias Lütke	12	7	10	9	3	7	11	1775	29
11	(United Kingdom) Toby Sowery	1	5	2		2		1	1729	52
12	(United Kingdom) Harry Tincknell	6	**8**	6		6	2	8	1709	32
13	(Mexico) Sebastián Álvarez	8	3	7	8	5		4	1666	35
14	(United States) Bijoy Garg	**2**	11	**4**		1		2	1632	40
15	(Switzerland) Mathias Beche	12		10	9	3	7	11	1511	23
16	(United Kingdom) Jonny Edgar	5	6	1		4		**10**	1505	47
17	(Sweden) Rasmus Lindh	4	2	5		7		6	1505	35
18	(France) Tristan Vautier		3	7		5	4	4	1464	24
19	(United States) Jacob Abel (Austria) Ferdinand Habsburg (United States) Naveen Rao	9	4	3		10		3	1420	30
20	(Canada) Parker Thompson	6	**8**	6		6		8	1361	32
21	(New Zealand) Hunter McElrea	10	1	9		9		9	1336	33
22	(Denmark) David Heinemeier Hansson	12	7	10		3		11	1265	29
23	(Portugal) Manuel Espírito Santo	11	9	8		11		5	1225	28
24	(United States) Jon Field (United Kingdom) Oliver Jarvis	7	10	11		12		7	1182	28
25	(United States) Seth Lucas	7	10	11					710	18
26	(Denmark) Christian Rasmussen	5					1		666	14
27	(United Kingdom) Ben Hanley	10			5				521	8
28	(France) Charles Milesi	12	7						480	14
29	(Netherlands) Max van der Snel					12		7	472	10
30	(United States) Nick Boulle						1		374	0
31	(Denmark) Malthe Jakobsen	1							373	13
32	(Portugal) António Félix da Costa	**2**							355	13
33	(New Zealand) Nick Cassidy (Greece) Georgios Kolovos (United States) Nolan Siegel (Poland) Jakub Śmiechowski	3							325	11
34	(United States) Ricky Taylor				4				312	0
35	(Switzerland) Grégoire Saucy	4							310	10
36	(United States) Ben Keating	6							278	8
37	(Australia) Josh Burdon (United Kingdom) Sennan Fielding (United States) Gerry Kraut		DNS			8			268	8
38	(Netherlands) Job van Uitert	7							258	8
39	(France) Sébastien Bourdais (Cayman Islands) Kyffin Simpson	8							250	11
40	(United States) Logan Sargeant	9							244	8
41	(Brazil) Enzo Fittipaldi	11							222	8
42	(United States) Dylan Murry (Denmark) Nicklas Nielsen (France) François Perrodo (France) Matthieu Vaxivière	13							199	8
Pos.	Drivers	DAY	SEB	WGL	MOS	ELK	IMS	ATL	Points	MEC

==== Standings: GT Daytona Pro (GTD Pro) ====
Pos.	Drivers	DAY	SEB	LGA	DET	WGL	MOS	ELK	VIR	IMS	ATL	Points	MEC
1	(United States) Connor De Phillippi (United States) Neil Verhagen	1	5	8	4	2	**3**	11	5	6	**3**	3012	48
2	(Italy) Andrea Caldarelli (United Kingdom) Sandy Mitchell	6	10	5	2	9	8	1	**1**	3	4	2979	31
3	(Netherlands) Nicky Catsburg (United States) Tommy Milner	4	3	2	7	8	4	3	6	2	12	2949	41
4	(United Kingdom) Harry King (United Kingdom) Nick Tandy	9	2	3	9	7	2	**2**	9	10	2	2921	41
5	(Germany) Christopher Mies (Belgium) Frédéric Vervisch	7	8	1	3	10	5	4	3	7	11	2825	32
6	(United Kingdom) Ben Barker (Norway) Dennis Olsen	14	6	6	5	3	7	5	2	1	9	2821	30
7	(United Kingdom) Ben Barnicoat (United Kingdom) Jack Hawksworth	10	**11**	**9**	6	**1**	1	6	7	5	10	2779	34
8	(Spain) Antonio García (United Kingdom) Alexander Sims	**13**	4	4	**1**	4	9	10	10	4	8	2776	35
9	(United States) Max Esterson (United States) Nikita Johnson	12	9	7	8	11	6	12	8	8	14	2392	22
10	(Austria) Klaus Bachler	5	1			12		9			7	1379	35
11	(Italy) Riccardo Agostini (United Kingdom) James Calado	8	7			6		7			13	1240	33
12	(Italy) Davide Rigon (Brazil) Daniel Serra	15	13			5		8			5	1206	28
13	(Austria) Thomas Preining	5	1					9			7	1169	31
14	(France) Valentin Hasse-Clot						10		4	9	1	1134	9
15	(Belgium) Alessio Picariello	9	2								2	926	28
18	(Denmark) Marco Sørensen								4	9	1	908	9
17	(Argentina) Nico Varrone	4	3								12	848	30
18	(Germany) Marvin Kirchhöfer	**13**	4								8	779	27
19	(United Kingdom) Sebastian Priaulx	7	8								11	737	22
20	(Spain) Miguel Molina	8	7								13	707	24
21	(United Kingdom) Dan Harper	1									**3**	701	25
22	(Germany) Mike Rockenfeller	14	6								9	700	21
23	(United States) Kyle Kirkwood	10	**11**								10	694	20
24	(Italy) Alessandro Pier Guidi	15	13								5	672	14
25	(Germany) Max Hesse	1	5									658	27
26	(Switzerland) Ricardo Feller	5	1									658	21
27	(Australia) Chaz Mostert	2			10							584	10
28	(France) Franck Perera		10								4	532	12
29	(United States) Jason Hart (United States) Scott Noble (Germany) Luca Stolz	3	12									512	15
30	(United Kingdom) Dean MacDonald	12	9									470	14
31	(Italy) Mattia Drudi										1	382	9
32	(Germany) Maro Engel (Australia) Kenny Habul (Australia) Will Power	2										350	10
33	(Belgium) Maxime Martin	3										322	9
34	(Turkey) Ayhancan Güven	5										278	10
35	(Italy) Mirko Bortolotti (Canada) James Hinchcliffe	6										271	8
36	(Italy) Giacomo Altoè (France) Sébastien Bourdais (United Kingdom) Casper Stevenson										6	268	6
37	(France) Mathieu Jaminet										7	265	6
38	(Italy) Alessio Rovera	8										258	8
39	(Australia) Scott Andrews						10					236	0
40	(United States) Aaron Telitz				10							234	-
41	(United States) Anthony Bartone (Germany) Maximilian Götz (Andorra) Jules Gounon (Germany) Fabian Schiller	11										225	8
42	(Estonia) Jüri Vips	12										222	8
43	(Denmark) Michael Christensen (Netherlands) Loek Hartog					12						210	4
44	(Germany) Benjamin Goethe										14	192	6
Pos.	Drivers	DAY	SEB	LGA	DET	WGL	MOS	ELK	VIR	IMS	ATL	Points	MEC

==== Standings: GT Daytona (GTD) ====
Pos.	Drivers	DAY	SEB	LBH	LGA	WGL	MOS	ELK	VIR	IMS	ATL	Points	MEC
1	(Switzerland) Philip Ellis (United States) Russell Ward	1	18	9	5	15	1	1	1	2	**1**	3078	40
2	(United States) Robby Foley (United States) Patrick Gallagher	10	5	2	7	7	3	5	2	1	18	2843	32
3	(Brazil) Eduardo Barrichello	**3**	**2**	10	2	5	**6**	15	4	5	17	2742	38
4	(Denmark) Benjamin Pedersen (United States) Aaron Telitz	9	12	1	6	**4**	2	9	9	8	11	2677	24
5	(United Kingdom) Matt Bell (Canada) Orey Fidani	4	6	12	12	13	12	7	6	3	10	2414	31
6	(United States) Brendan Iribe	13	17	4	3	18	7	8	3	10	8	2398	31
7	(United States) Adam Adelson (United Kingdom) Callum Ilott	20	3	15	4	2	9	17	10	6	7	2387	37
8	(Spain) Albert Costa	14	7	3	**13**	6	4	18	7	11	13	2363	36
9	(Denmark) Frederik Schandorff	13	17	4	3		7	8	3	10	8	2268	27
10	(United Kingdom) Tom Gamble	**3**	**2**		2	5		15	4	5	17	2217	38
11	(Costa Rica) Danny Formal (United States) Trent Hindman	8	16	17	1	20	5	12	5	13	16	2215	28
12	(United States) Mason Filippi	17	9	**6**		11	13	14	8	12	3	2061	32
13	(Italy) Lorenzo Patrese	14	7		**13**	6	4	18	7	11	13	2039	36
14	(United States) Jake Walker	18	8	16	9	12	11	13	10	7	15	2033	28
15	(Brazil) Felipe Fraga (United States) Sheena Monk	19	11	7	8	14	8	19	12	9	15	2011	29
16	(Italy) Giacomo Altoè	16	15	11	11	16	10	4	**11**	4		1978	24
17	(United Kingdom) Casper Stevenson	16	15			16	10	4	**11**	4		1544	24
18	(Netherlands) Indy Dontje	1	18			15		1			**1**	1464	40
19	(United States) Frankie Montecalvo	9	12	5		**4**		9			11	1461	24
20	(United States) Corey Lewis	18		16	9	12	11		10	7		1431	12
21	(Netherlands) Lin Hodenius (Republic of Ireland) James Roe	6	4			10		6			4	1372	31
22	(Italy) Antonio Fuoco (United States) Simon Mann	5	1			17		**11**			6	1318	39
23	(France) Valentin Hasse-Clot	11	13	8		3		3				1308	23
24	(Canada) Zacharie Robichon	**3**	**2**			5		15			17	1307	38
25	(Australia) Scott Andrews	6	4		10	10		6				1299	23
26	(United States) Kenton Koch (United States) Robert Megennis (United States) Onofrio Triarsi	7	14			8		2			9	1264	30
27	(Germany) Lars Kern	4	6			13		7			10	1221	31
28	(United States) Francis Selldorff	10	5			7		5			18	1212	32
29	(United States) Spencer Pumpelly	2	10	10		19					5	1197	26
30	(United States) Ryan Hardwick (Italy) Riccardo Pera	12	19			1		16			2	1189	34
31	(Australia) Tom Sargent	20	3			2		17			7	1187	37
32	(France) Lilou Wadoux	5	1					**11**			6	1178	35
33	(Canada) Robert Wickens			**6**			13	14	8		12	1133	4
34	(Republic of Ireland) Charlie Eastwood	17	9			11		14			3	1120	32
35	(Belgium) Jan Heylen	21	10			9		10			12	1005	28
36	(United Kingdom) Till Bechtolsheimer	18	8			12		13			15	936	28
37	(Sweden) Henrik Hedman	16	15	11	11	16						931	18
38	(Turkey) Salih Yoluç	17	9			11					3	928	28
39	(United States) Rory van der Steur	11	13	8	10							913	14
40	(United States) Graham Doyle	8	16			20		12			16	907	28
41	(Netherlands) Morris Schuring	12	19					16			2	839	27
42	(United States) Jenson Altzman	19	11			14		19			14	836	29
43	(United States) Manny Franco	14	7	3								769	18
44	(United States) Joey Hand	18	8					13			15	746	24
45	(United Kingdom) Ollie Millroy	13	17			18		8				739	25
46	(United States) John Potter	2				19					5	729	20
47	(United States) Alec Udell					17		4			13	652	19
48	(Spain) Fran Rueda					6		18			8	645	15
49	(United States) Trenton Estep (France) Marius Fossard					3		3				630	10
50	(New Zealand) Ryan Yardley	15						10			12	618	12
51	(United States) Dillon Machavern	21	10			9						559	18
52	(Austria) Richard Lietz	12				1						553	15
53	(France) Sébastien Baud	11	13									429	14
54	(Canada) Zachary Vanier			14							12	405	6
55	(Germany) Mario Farnbacher					19					5	393	10
56	(Austria) Lucas Auer	1										382	12
57	(United States) Madison Snow (Denmark) Nicki Thiim	2										336	10
58	(Italy) Mattia Drudi	**3**										335	10
59	(Germany) Luca Stolz										4	308	8
60	(United Kingdom) Ben Green	4										295	10
61	(Canada) Roman De Angelis						**6**					285	0
62	(Italy) Tommaso Mosca	5										285	10
63	(Estonia) Ralf Aron	6										273	8
64	(United Kingdom) Jack Hawksworth			5								260	0
65	(China) Yifei Ye	7										260	8
66	(Sweden) Marcus Ericsson	8										249	8
67	(Germany) Jens Klingmann	10										240	12
68	(France) Esteban Masson	9										237	8
69	(Canada) Devlin DeFrancesco							10				234	4
70	(Thailand) Carl Bennett	11										226	8
71	(United States) Eric Lux					9						220	4
72	(Italy) David Fumanelli	13										202	11
73	(United Kingdom) Harry King (Denmark) Mikkel O. Pedersen			13								202	0
74	(Italy) Andrea Caldarelli			14								193	0
75	(Netherlands) Thierry Vermeulen	14										188	10
76	(Italy) Matteo Cairoli	16										174	8
77	(United States) Peter Ludwig (United States) Dave Musial (United States) Dave Musial Jr.	15										172	8
78	(New Zealand) Scott McLaughlin	17										168	11
79	(United States) Elliott Skeer	20										131	8
80	(New Zealand) Jaxon Evans					18						130	4
81	(France) Romain Grosjean	19										130	8
82	(Germany) Sven Müller (United States) Eric Zitza	21										111	8
Pos.	Drivers	DAY	SEB	LBH	LGA	WGL	MOS	ELK	VIR	IMS	ATL	Points	MEC

=== Teams' Championships ===
==== Standings: Grand Touring Prototype (GTP) ====
Pos.	Team	Car	DAY	SEB	LBH	LGA	DET	WGL	ELK	IMS	ATL	Points	MEC
1	#31 Cadillac Whelen	Cadillac V-Series.R	2	**3**	2	2	**1**	**1**	8	2	7	3020	43
2	#93 Acura Meyer Shank Racing with Curb-Agajanian	Acura ARX-06	**5**	6	**1**	5	4	2	**4**	7	10	2723	34
3	#6 Porsche Penske Motorsport	Porsche 963	4	2	3	6	8	6	10	3	1	2709	43
4	#24 BMW M Team WRT	BMW M Hybrid V8	3	5	5	9	9	4	11	1	2	2650	36
5	#7 Porsche Penske Motorsport	Porsche 963	1	1	4	7	5	5	6	11	8	2638	54
6	#40 Cadillac Wayne Taylor Racing	Cadillac V-Series.R	6	7	8	**10**	6	8	3	4	3	2556	31
7	#5 JDC–Miller MotorSports	Porsche 963	7	8	6	1	11	3	2	9	9	2525	31
8	#60 Acura Meyer Shank Racing with Curb-Agajanian	Acura ARX-06	9	4	7	4	7	10	9	**5**	**6**	2465	31
9	#10 Cadillac Wayne Taylor Racing	Cadillac V-Series.R	11	11	10	11	3	7	1	6	4	2448	32
10	#25 BMW M Team WRT	BMW M Hybrid V8	8	10	11	3	2	9	7	10	11	2338	29
11	#23 Aston Martin THOR Team	Aston Martin Valkyrie	10	9	9	8	10	11	5	8	5	2242	28
Pos.	Team	Car	DAY	SEB	LBH	LGA	DET	WGL	ELK	IMS	ATL	Points	MEC

==== Standings: Le Mans Prototype 2 (LMP2) ====
Pos.	Team	Car	DAY	SEB	WGL	MOS	ELK	IMS	ATL	Points	MEC
1	#04 CrowdStrike Racing by APR	Oreca 07	1	5	2	2	2	9	1	2322	52
2	#43 Inter Europol Competition	Oreca 07	**2**	11	**4**	**1**	1	**6**	2	2302	40
3	#22 United Autosports USA	Oreca 07	4	2	5	5	**7**	3	6	2127	35
4	#99 AO Racing	Oreca 07	5	6	1	3	4	8	**10**	2087	47
5	#52 Bryan Herta Autosport with PR1/Mathiasen	Oreca 07	6	**8**	6	4	6	2	8	2021	32
6	#8 Tower Motorsports	Oreca 07	8	3	7	8	5	4	4	1967	35
7	#2 United Autosports USA	Oreca 07	10	1	9	7	9	10	9	1835	33
8	#18 Era Motorsport	Oreca 07	9	4	3		10	1	3	1794	30
9	#73 Pratt Miller Motorsports	Oreca 07	11	9	8	6	11	5	5	1782	28
10	#11 TDS Racing	Oreca 07	12	7	10	9	3	7	11	1775	29
11	#37 Intersport Racing	Oreca 07	7	10	11		12		7	1182	28
12	#343 Inter Europol Competition	Oreca 07	3							325	11
13	#79 JDC-Miller MotorSports	Oreca 07		DNS			8			268	8
14	#83 AF Corse USA	Oreca 07	13							199	8
Pos.	Team	Car	DAY	SEB	WGL	MOS	ELK	IMS	ATL	Points	MEC

==== Standings: GT Daytona Pro (GTD Pro) ====
Pos.	Team	Car	DAY	SEB	LGA	DET	WGL	MOS	ELK	VIR	IMS	ATL	Points	MEC
1	#1 Paul Miller Racing	BMW M4 GT3 Evo	1	5	8	4	2	**3**	11	5	6	**3**	3017	46
2	#9 Pfaff Motorsports	Lamborghini Huracán GT3 Evo 2 1 Lamborghini Temerario GT3 9	6	10	5	2	9	8	1	**1**	3	4	2979	31
3	#4 Corvette Racing by Pratt Miller Motorsports	Chevrolet Corvette Z06 GT3.R	4	3	2	7	8	4	3	6	2	12	2949	41
4	#77 AO Racing	Porsche 911 GT3 R (992.2)	9	2	3	9	7	2	**2**	9	10	2	2921	41
5	#65 Ford Racing	Ford Mustang GT3 Evo	7	8	1	3	10	5	4	3	7	11	2825	32
6	#64 Ford Racing	Ford Mustang GT3 Evo	14	6	6	5	3	7	5	2	1	9	2821	30
7	#14 Vasser Sullivan Racing	Lexus RC F GT3	10	**11**	**9**	6	**1**	1	6	7	5	10	2779	34
8	#3 Corvette Racing by Pratt Miller Motorsports	Chevrolet Corvette Z06 GT3.R	**13**	4	4	**1**	4	9	10	10	4	8	2776	35
9	#59 RLL Team McLaren	McLaren 720S GT3 Evo	12	9	7	8	11	6	12	8	8	14	2392	28
10	#911 Manthey Racing	Porsche 911 GT3 R (992.2)	5	1			12		9			7	1379	35
11	#033 Triarsi Competizione	Ferrari 296 GT3 Evo	8	7			6		7			13	1257	33
12	#62 Risi Competizione	Ferrari 296 GT3 Evo	15	13			5		8			5	1206	28
13	#68 Car Blanche	Aston Martin Vantage AMR GT3 Evo						10		4	9	1	1144	9
14	#48 Winward Racing	Mercedes-AMG GT3 Evo	3	12									512	15
15	#75 75 Express	Mercedes-AMG GT3 Evo	2										350	10
16	#74 DragonSpeed	Chevrolet Corvette Z06 GT3.R										6	268	6
17	#15 Vasser Sullivan Racing	Lexus RC F GT3				10							234	-
18	#69 Bartone Bros with GetSpeed	Mercedes-AMG GT3 Evo	11										225	8
Pos.	Team	Car	DAY	SEB	LGA	DET	WGL	MOS	ELK	VIR	IMS	ATL	Points	MEC

==== Standings: GT Daytona (GTD) ====
Pos.	Team	Car	DAY	SEB	LBH	LGA	WGL	MOS	ELK	VIR	IMS	ATL	Points	MEC
1	#57 Winward Racing	Mercedes-AMG GT3 Evo	1	18	9	5	15	1	1	1	2	**1**	3078	40
2	#96 Turner Motorsport	BMW M4 GT3 Evo	10	5	2	7	7	3	5	2	1	18	2843	32
3	#27 Heart of Racing Team	Aston Martin Vantage AMR GT3 Evo	**3**	**2**	10	2	5	**6**	15	4	5	17	2742	38
4	#12 Vasser Sullivan Racing	Lexus RC F GT3	9	12	1	6	**4**	2	9	9	8	11	2677	30
5	#13 13 Autosport	Chevrolet Corvette Z06 GT3.R	4	6	12	12	13	12	7	6	3	10	2414	31
6	#70 Inception Racing	Ferrari 296 GT3 Evo	13	17	4	3	18	7	8	3	10	8	2398	31
7	#120 Wright Motorsports	Porsche 911 GT3 R (992.2)	20	3	15	4	2	9	17	10	6	7	2387	37
8	#34 Conquest Racing	Ferrari 296 GT3 Evo	14	7	3	**13**	6	4	18	7	11	13	2363	36
9	#45 Wayne Taylor Racing	Lamborghini Huracán GT3 Evo 2	8	16	17	1	20	5	12	5	13	16	2215	28
10	#36 DXDT Racing	Chevrolet Corvette Z06 GT3.R	17	9	**6**		11	13	14	8	12	3	2061	32
11	#66 Gradient Racing	Ford Mustang GT3 Evo	18	8	16	9	12	11	13	11	7	15	2033	28
12	#16 Myers Riley Motorsports	Ford Mustang GT3 Evo	19	11	7	8	14	8	19	13	9	14	2011	29
13	#81 DragonSpeed	Chevrolet Corvette Z06 GT3.R	16	15	11	11	16	10	4	**12**	4		1978	24
14	#19 van der Steur Racing 4 #068 Car Blanche 2	Aston Martin Vantage AMR GT3 Evo	11	13	8	10	3		3				1543	23
15	#80 Lone Star Racing	Mercedes-AMG GT3 Evo	6	4			10		6			4	1372	31
16	#21 AF Corse USA	Ferrari 296 GT3 Evo	5	1			17		**11**			6	1318	39
17	#023 Triarsi Competizione	Ferrari 296 GT3 Evo	7	14			8		2			9	1264	30
18	#912 Manthey 1st Phorm	Porsche 911 GT3 R (992.2)	12	19			1		16			2	1189	34
19	#28 RS1	Porsche 911 GT3 R (992.2)	21	10			9		10			12	1005	28
20	#44 Magnus Racing	Aston Martin Vantage AMR GT3 Evo	2				19					5	729	20
21	#89 Vasser Sullivan Racing	Lexus RC F GT3			5								260	-
22	#177 AO Racing	Porsche 911 GT3 R (992.2)			13								202	-
23	#46 Pfaff Motorsports	Lamborghini Temerario GT3			14								193	-
24	#123 Mühlner Motorsport	Porsche 911 GT3 R (992.2)	15										172	8
Pos.	Team	Car	DAY	SEB	LBH	LGA	WGL	MOS	ELK	VIR	IMS	ATL	Points	MEC

=== Manufacturers' Championships ===
==== Standings: Grand Touring Prototype (GTP) ====
Pos.	Manufacturer	DAY	SEB	LBH	LGA	DET	WGL	ELK	IMS	ATL	Points	MEC
1	(United States) Cadillac	2	**3**	2	**2**	**1**	**1**	1	2	3	3244	52
2	(Germany) Porsche	1	1	3	1	5	3	2	3	1	3156	62
3	(Japan) Acura	**5**	4	**1**	4	4	2	**4**	**5**	**6**	2973	42
4	(Germany) BMW	3	5	5	3	2	4	7	1	2	2960	40
5	(United Kingdom) Aston Martin	10	9	9	8	10	11	5	8	5	2616	28
Pos.	Manufacturer	DAY	SEB	LBH	LGA	DET	WGL	ELK	IMS	ATL	Points	MEC

==== Standings: GT Daytona Pro (GTD Pro) ====
Pos.	Manufacturer	DAY	SEB	LGA	DET	WGL	MOS	ELK	VIR	IMS	ATL	Points	MEC
1	(United States) Chevrolet	**4**	3	2	**1**	4	4	3	6	2	6	3248	47
2	(United States) Ford	7	6	1	3	3	5	4	2	1	9	3163	35
3	(Germany) BMW	1	5	8	4	2	**3**	11	5	6	**3**	3156	47
4	(Germany) Porsche	5	1	3	9	7	2	**2**	9	10	2	3090	46
5	(Italy) Lamborghini	6	10	5	2	9	8	1	**1**	3	4	3089	31
6	(Japan) Lexus	10	**11**	9	6	**1**	1	6	7	5	10	2935	34
7	(United Kingdom) McLaren	12	9	7	8	11	6	12	8	8	14	2647	28
8	(Italy) Ferrari	8	7			5		7			5	1401	33
9	(United Kingdom) Aston Martin						10		4	9	1	1206	9
10	(Germany) Mercedes-AMG	2	12									570	18
Pos.	Manufacturer	DAY	SEB	LGA	DET	WGL	MOS	ELK	VIR	IMS	ATL	Points	MEC

==== Standings: GT Daytona (GTD) ====
Pos.	Manufacturer	DAY	SEB	LBH	LGA	WGL	MOS	ELK	VIR	IMS	ATL	Points	MEC
1	(Germany) Mercedes-AMG	1	4	9	5	10	1	1	1	2	**1**	3339	43
2	(United Kingdom) Aston Martin	**2**	**2**	8	2	3	**6**	3	4	4	5	3166	44
3	(Italy) Ferrari	5	1	3	3	6	4	**2**	3	10	6	3136	49
4	(Germany) BMW	10	5	2	7	7	3	5	2	1	18	2988	33
5	(Japan) Lexus	9	12	1	6	**4**	2	9	9	9	11	2889	32
6	(United States) Chevrolet	4	6	**6**	11	11	10	4	**6**	3	3	2869	36
7	(Germany) Porsche	15	3	13	4	1	9	10	10	6	2	2860	42
8	(Italy) Lamborghini	8	16	14	1	20	5	12	5	13	16	2683	28
9	(United States) Ford	18	8	7	8	12	8	13	11	7	14	2530	29
Pos.	Manufacturer	DAY	SEB	LBH	LGA	WGL	MOS	ELK	VIR	IMS	ATL	Points	MEC

== See also ==
- 2026 FIA World Endurance Championship
- 2026 European Le Mans Series
