= 2026 Michelin GT Challenge at VIR =

Ninth round of the 2026 IMSA SportsCar Championship season

The layout of Virginia International Raceway, where the race was held

The 2026 Michelin GT Challenge at VIR will be a sports car race held at Virginia International Raceway in Alton, Virginia, on August 23, 2026. It will be the ninth round of the 2026 IMSA SportsCar Championship.

== Background ==
=== Preview ===
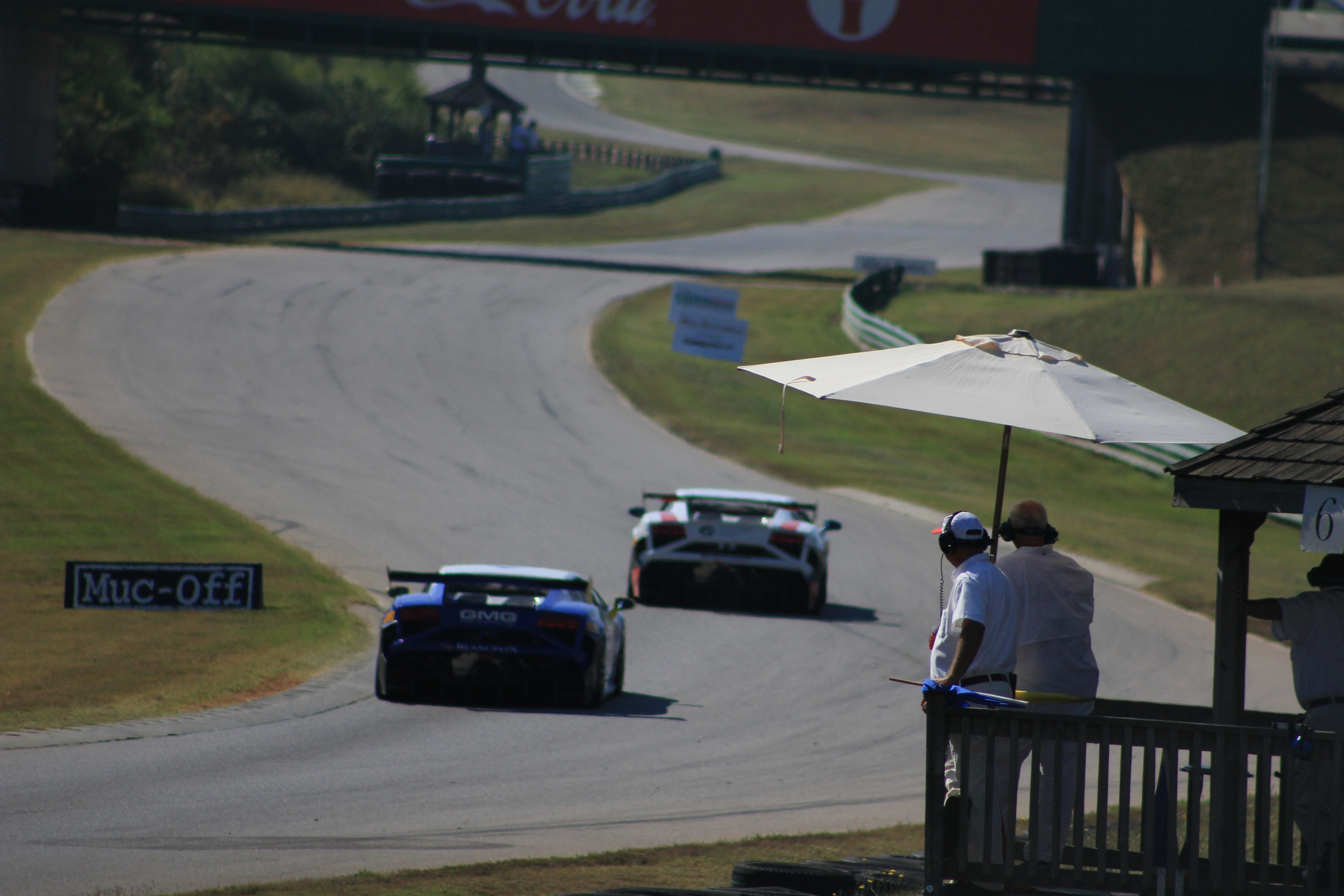
Virginia International Raceway, where the race was held

International Motor Sports Association (IMSA) president John Doonan confirmed the race was part of the 2026 IMSA SportsCar Championship (IMSA SCC) in March 2025. It will be the thirteenth consecutive year the IMSA SCC hosted a race at Virginia International Raceway. The 2026 Michelin GT Challenge at VIR will be the ninth of eleven scheduled sports car races of 2026 by IMSA. The race will be held at the seventeen-turn 3.270 mi (5.263 km) Virginia International Raceway on August 23, 2026.

== Entry list ==
The entry list was published on August 13, 2026, and featured 23 entries – 10 in GTD Pro, and 13 in GTD.

== Qualifying ==
=== Qualifying results ===
Pole positions in each class are indicated in bold and with ‡.

== Race ==
=== Post-race ===
Class winners are in bold and ‡.

Pos	Class	No	Team	Drivers	Chassis	Laps	Time/Retired
Pos	Class	No	Team	Drivers	Engine	Laps	Time/Retired
1	**GTD Pro**	**9**	**(Canada) Pfaff Motorsports**	**(Italy) Andrea Caldarelli** **(United Kingdom) Sandy Mitchell**	**Lamborghini Temerario GT3**	**84**	**2:41:29.130‡**
1	**GTD Pro**	**9**	**(Canada) Pfaff Motorsports**	**(Italy) Andrea Caldarelli** **(United Kingdom) Sandy Mitchell**	**Lamborghini L411 4.0 L Turbo V8**	**84**	**2:41:29.130‡**
2	GTD Pro	64	(United States) Ford Racing	(United Kingdom) Ben Barker (Norway) Dennis Olsen	Ford Mustang GT3 Evo	84	+1.517
2	GTD Pro	64	(United States) Ford Racing	(United Kingdom) Ben Barker (Norway) Dennis Olsen	Ford Coyote 5.4 L V8	84	+1.517
3	GTD Pro	65	(United States) Ford Racing	(Germany) Christopher Mies (Belgium) Frédéric Vervisch	Ford Mustang GT3 Evo	84	+39.039
3	GTD Pro	65	(United States) Ford Racing	(Germany) Christopher Mies (Belgium) Frédéric Vervisch	Ford Coyote 5.4 L V8	84	+39.039
4	GTD Pro	68	(United States) Car Blanche	(France) Valentin Hasse-Clot (Denmark) Marco Sørensen	Aston Martin Vantage AMR GT3 Evo	84	+42.437
4	GTD Pro	68	(United States) Car Blanche	(France) Valentin Hasse-Clot (Denmark) Marco Sørensen	Aston Martin AMR16A 4.0 L Turbo V8	84	+42.437
5	GTD Pro	1	(United States) Paul Miller Racing	(United States) Connor De Phillippi (United States) Neil Verhagen	BMW M4 GT3 Evo	84	+44.229
5	GTD Pro	1	(United States) Paul Miller Racing	(United States) Connor De Phillippi (United States) Neil Verhagen	BMW P58 3.0 L Turbo I6	84	+44.229
6	**GTD**	**57**	**(United States) Winward Racing**	**(Switzerland) Philip Ellis** **(United States) Russell Ward**	**Mercedes-AMG GT3 Evo**	**84**	**+58.643‡**
6	**GTD**	**57**	**(United States) Winward Racing**	**(Switzerland) Philip Ellis** **(United States) Russell Ward**	**Mercedes-AMG M159 6.2 L V8**	**84**	**+58.643‡**
7	GTD Pro	4	(United States) Corvette Racing by Pratt Miller Motorsports	(Netherlands) Nicky Catsburg (United States) Tommy Milner	Chevrolet Corvette Z06 GT3.R	84	+59.234
7	GTD Pro	4	(United States) Corvette Racing by Pratt Miller Motorsports	(Netherlands) Nicky Catsburg (United States) Tommy Milner	Chevrolet LT6.R 5.5 L V8	84	+59.234
8	GTD Pro	14	(United States) Vasser Sullivan Racing	(United Kingdom) Ben Barnicoat (United Kingdom) Jack Hawksworth	Lexus RC F GT3	84	+1:04.004
8	GTD Pro	14	(United States) Vasser Sullivan Racing	(United Kingdom) Ben Barnicoat (United Kingdom) Jack Hawksworth	Toyota 2UR-GSE 5.4 L V8	84	+1:04.004
9	GTD	96	(United States) Turner Motorsport	(United States) Robby Foley (United States) Patrick Gallagher	BMW M4 GT3 Evo	84	+1:05.056
9	GTD	96	(United States) Turner Motorsport	(United States) Robby Foley (United States) Patrick Gallagher	BMW P58 3.0 L Turbo I6	84	+1:05.056
10	GTD	70	(United Kingdom) Inception Racing	(United States) Brendan Iribe (Denmark) Frederik Schandorff	Ferrari 296 GT3 Evo	84	+1:07.007
10	GTD	70	(United Kingdom) Inception Racing	(United States) Brendan Iribe (Denmark) Frederik Schandorff	Ferrari F163CE 3.0 L Turbo V6	84	+1:07.007
11	GTD	27	(United States) Heart of Racing Team	(Brazil) Eduardo Barrichello (United Kingdom) Tom Gamble	Aston Martin Vantage AMR GT3 Evo	84	+1:07.560
11	GTD	27	(United States) Heart of Racing Team	(Brazil) Eduardo Barrichello (United Kingdom) Tom Gamble	Aston Martin AMR16A 4.0 L Turbo V8	84	+1:07.560
12	GTD Pro	59	(United States) RLL Team McLaren	(United States) Max Esterson (United States) Nikita Johnson	McLaren 720S GT3 Evo	84	+1:10.928
12	GTD Pro	59	(United States) RLL Team McLaren	(United States) Max Esterson (United States) Nikita Johnson	McLaren M840T 4.0 L Turbo V8	84	+1:10.928
13	GTD	45	(United States) Wayne Taylor Racing	(Costa Rica) Danny Formal (United States) Trent Hindman	Lamborghini Huracán GT3 Evo 2	84	+1:11.377
13	GTD	45	(United States) Wayne Taylor Racing	(Costa Rica) Danny Formal (United States) Trent Hindman	Lamborghini DGF 5.2 L V10	84	+1:11.377
14	GTD	13	(Canada) 13 Autosport	(United Kingdom) Matt Bell (Canada) Orey Fidani	Chevrolet Corvette Z06 GT3.R	84	+1:14.883
14	GTD	13	(Canada) 13 Autosport	(United Kingdom) Matt Bell (Canada) Orey Fidani	Chevrolet LT6.R 5.5 L V8	84	+1:14.883
15	GTD Pro	77	(United States) AO Racing	(United Kingdom) Harry King (United Kingdom) Nick Tandy	Porsche 911 GT3 R (992.2)	84	+1:34.688
15	GTD Pro	77	(United States) AO Racing	(United Kingdom) Harry King (United Kingdom) Nick Tandy	Porsche M97/80 4.2 L Flat-6	84	+1:34.688
16	GTD	34	(United States) Conquest Racing	(Spain) Albert Costa (Italy) Lorenzo Patrese	Ferrari 296 GT3 Evo	84	+1:35.948
16	GTD	34	(United States) Conquest Racing	(Spain) Albert Costa (Italy) Lorenzo Patrese	Ferrari F163CE 3.0 L Turbo V6	84	+1:35.948
17	GTD	36	(United States) DXDT Racing	(United States) Mason Filippi (Canada) Robert Wickens	Chevrolet Corvette Z06 GT3.R	84	+1:36.730
17	GTD	36	(United States) DXDT Racing	(United States) Mason Filippi (Canada) Robert Wickens	Chevrolet LT6.R 5.5 L V8	84	+1:36.730
18	GTD	12	(United States) Vasser Sullivan Racing	(Denmark) Benjamin Pedersen (United States) Aaron Telitz	Lexus RC F GT3	84	+1:37.188
18	GTD	12	(United States) Vasser Sullivan Racing	(Denmark) Benjamin Pedersen (United States) Aaron Telitz	Toyota 2UR-GSE 5.4 L V8	84	+1:37.188
19	GTD	120	(United States) Wright Motorsports	(United States) Adam Adelson (United Kingdom) Callum Ilott	Porsche 911 GT3 R (992.2)	84	+1:38.614
19	GTD	120	(United States) Wright Motorsports	(United States) Adam Adelson (United Kingdom) Callum Ilott	Porsche M97/80 4.2 L Flat-6	84	+1:38.614
20	GTD	66	(United States) Gradient Racing	(United States) Jake Walker (United States) Corey Lewis	Ford Mustang GT3 Evo	83	+1 Lap
20	GTD	66	(United States) Gradient Racing	(United States) Jake Walker (United States) Corey Lewis	Ford Coyote 5.4 L V8	83	+1 Lap
21	GTD	81	(United States) DragonSpeed	(Italy) Giacomo Altoè (United Kingdom) Casper Stevenson	Chevrolet Corvette Z06 GT3.R	78	+5 Laps
21	GTD	81	(United States) DragonSpeed	(Italy) Giacomo Altoè (United Kingdom) Casper Stevenson	Chevrolet LT6.R 5.5 L V8	78	+5 Laps
22	GTD	16	(United States) Myers Riley Motorsports	(Brazil) Felipe Fraga (United States) Sheena Monk	Ford Mustang GT3 Evo	60	+24 Laps
22	GTD	16	(United States) Myers Riley Motorsports	(Brazil) Felipe Fraga (United States) Sheena Monk	Ford Coyote 5.4 L V8	60	+24 Laps
23 DNF	GTD Pro	3	(United States) Corvette Racing by Pratt Miller Motorsports	(Spain) Antonio García (United Kingdom) Alexander Sims	Chevrolet Corvette Z06 GT3.R	0	Crash
23 DNF	GTD Pro	3	(United States) Corvette Racing by Pratt Miller Motorsports	(Spain) Antonio García (United Kingdom) Alexander Sims	Chevrolet LT6.R 5.5 L V8	0	Crash

IMSA SportsCar Championship
Previous race: SportsCar Grand Prix	2026 season	Next race: IMSA Battle on the Bricks
