= Chevrolet Gemini small-block engine =

Chevrolet V8 engine

Gemini small-block engine
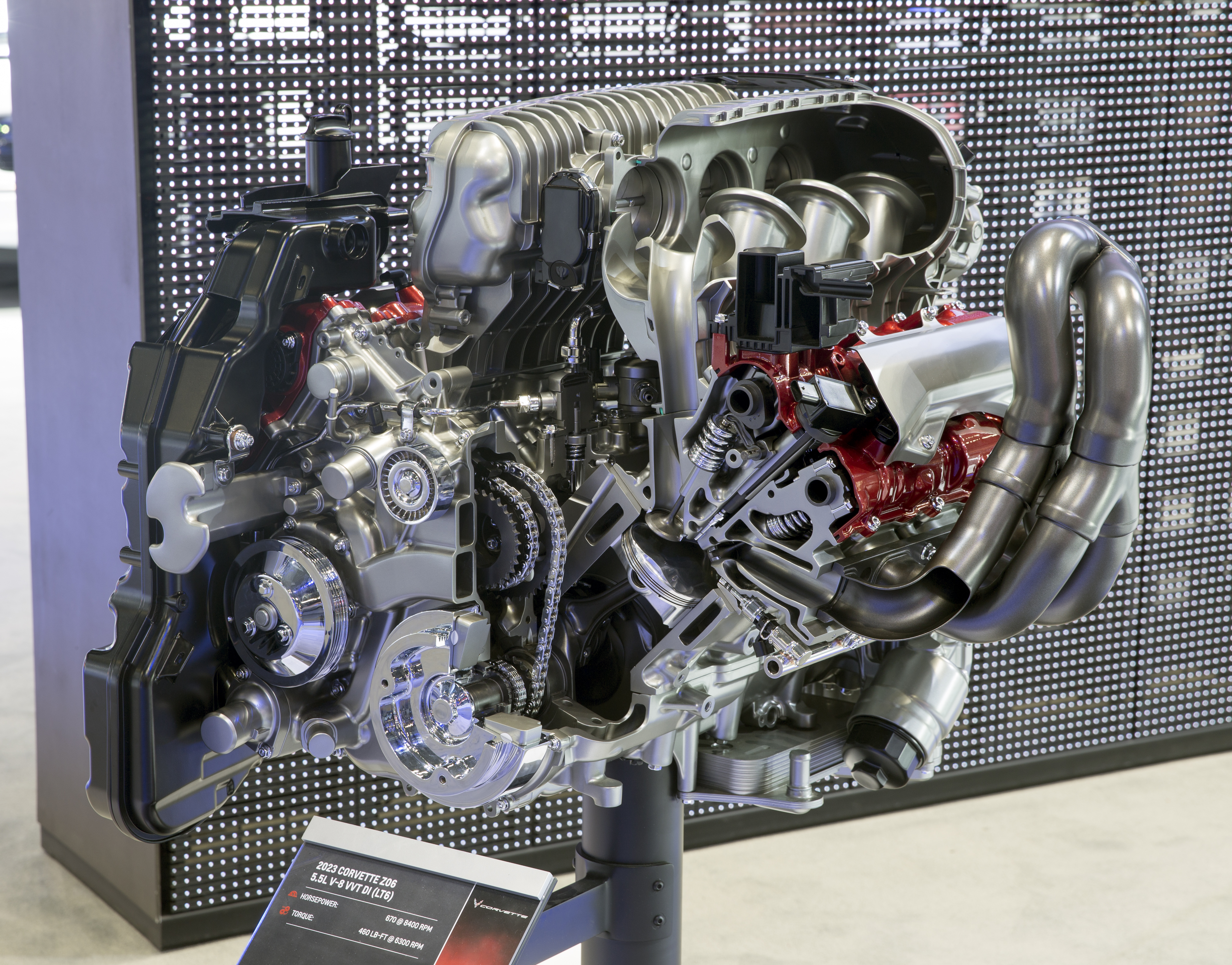

Overview
- Manufacturer: General Motors (Chevrolet)
- Production: 2022–present

Layout
- Configuration: 90° V8
- Displacement: 5,463 cc (333.4 cu in)
- Cylinder bore: 104.25 mm (4.104 in)
- Piston stroke: 80 mm (3.1 in)
- Cylinder block material: Sand-cast A319 Aluminum
- Cylinder head material: Aluminum
- Valvetrain: DOHC 4 valves
- Compression ratio: 12.5:1 (LT6); 9.8:1 (LT7)

RPM range
- Max. engine speed: 8,600 RPM (LT6); 8,000 RPM (LT7)

Combustion
- Turbocharger: Twin-turbo (LT7)
- Fuel system: Direct fuel injection (LT6); Direct and port injection (LT7)
- Management: GM E68 (32-bit)
- Fuel type: Gasoline
- Oil system: Dry sump
- Cooling system: Water-cooled

The Chevrolet Gemini small-block engine is a dual-overhead cam (DOHC) V8 engine designed by General Motors. While generally considered a "small-block Chevy" engine because of its bore spacing of 4.4 inches, General Motors engineers do not consider it to be a part of the traditional Chevrolet small block lineage because of the substantial reworking, specialized development, and unique technical features distinguishing its design.

The Gemini is a clean-sheet design, mechanically unrelated to both the LS-based engines and the Cadillac Blackwing V8. Its most notable traits include a flat-plane crankshaft and dual-overhead camshafts, which represents a departure from the traditional pushrod valves and crossplane crankshafts found in all previous generations of Chevrolet small-block engines. As of July 2024, the Gemini engine has two variants, dubbed LT6 and LT7.

== LT6 ==
The LT6 is a 5.5-liter, naturally-aspirated V8 engine. It debuted in the eighth-generation Corvette Z06, and was unveiled on October 26, 2021.

While the LT6 features a redline of 8,600 RPM, it generates a maximum of 670 hp (500 kW; 679 PS) at 8,400 RPM and 460 lb⋅ft (624 N⋅m) of torque at 6,300 RPM. These figures make it the most powerful naturally-aspirated production V8 engine of all time; the engine to previously hold this title, the Mercedes-Benz SLS AMG Black Series M159 6.2-liter V8, made 622 hp (464 kW; 631 PS) at 7,400 RPM.

The LT6 is also the largest naturally-aspirated flat-plane V8 used in a production car by displacement, dethroning the Ford Voodoo, and second overall to only the SSC 5.9L twin-turbo flat-plane V8. This is notable due to the additional vibrations inherent to this architecture compared to a crossplane V8, which tend to scale up with displacement.

A modified version of the LT6 has powered the Chevrolet Corvette C8.R since 2019, and many features in the racing engine carry over to the road engine. Other notable features include a cast aluminum block, dual coil valve springs supporting titanium intake & sodium filled exhaust valves, forged aluminum pistons, forged titanium connecting rods, active split intake manifold with twin 87mm throttle bodies, four-into-two-into-one stainless steel exhaust headers, and a factory six-stage 10-quart dry sump oiling system with individual crank bay scavenging.

Applications:

Year(s)	Model	Power	Torque	Dyno Chart
2023–present	Chevrolet Corvette Z06	670 hp (500 kW) @ 8400 rpm	460 lb⋅ft (624 N⋅m) @ 6300 rpm	link

== LT7 ==
The LT7 is a twin-turbocharged variant of the LT6 which debuted in the eighth-generation Corvette ZR1 and was unveiled on July 25, 2024. The LT7 has a redline of 8,000 RPM, generating 1,064 hp (793 kW; 1,079 PS) at 7,000 RPM and 828 lb⋅ft (1,123 N⋅m) of torque at 6,000 RPM.

Although it was released later, the LT7 was developed in tandem with its LT6 sibling. Compared to it, the LT7 has stronger pistons and connecting rods. Combined with the bigger combustion chamber in the heads, this lowers the compression ratio from 12.5:1 to 9.8:1. Unlike the LT6, the LT7 uses both direct fuel injection and port injection, with a total of 16 injectors. However, the block casting is identical, and the crankshaft is almost identical. The dry-sump oil system carries the same eight quarts as the LT6, although there is an additional seventh scavenge stage in the ZR1 to keep the turbos lubricated. The intake manifold has a much lower volume than the LT6’s and there’s no exchange between the two cylinder banks. The turbochargers produce up to 20 psi (1.4 bar) in normal operating conditions and a maximum of 24 psi (1.7 bar) under high temperatures. Other features specific to the LT7 include turbo-integrated exhaust manifolds, water-to-air intercoolers, and an electrically actuated wastegate.

Applications:

Year(s)	Model	Power	Torque
2025–present	Chevrolet Corvette ZR1	1,064 hp (793 kW) @ 7000 rpm	828 lb⋅ft (1,123 N⋅m) @ 6000 rpm

== See also ==
- Chevrolet small-block engine
- General Motors LS-based small-block engine
- List of GM engines
