= Russell Ward (racing driver) =

American racing driver

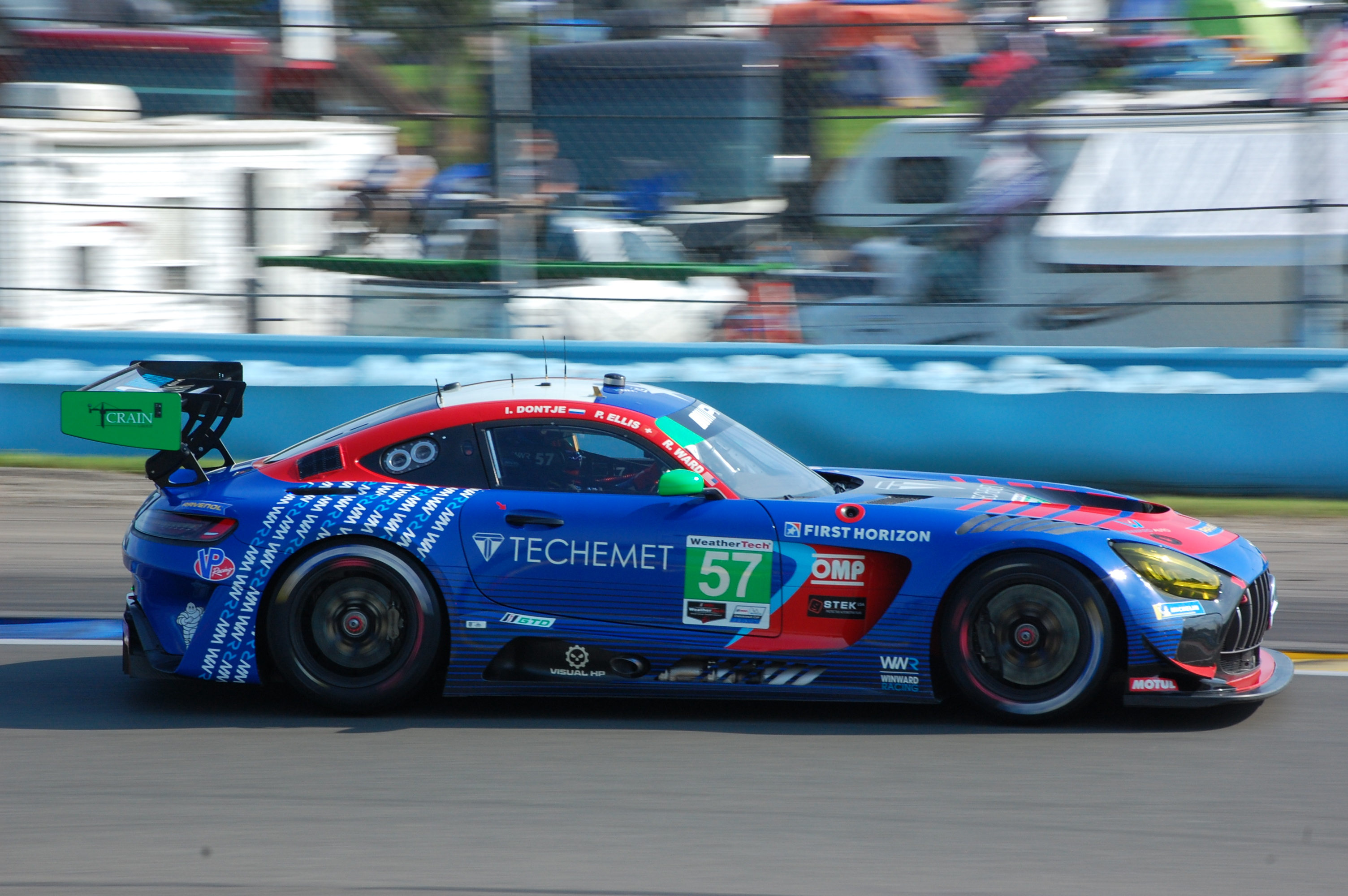
- Ward at Watkins Glen in 2025
- Nationality: (United States) American
- Born: March 8, 1992 (age 34) Seabrook, Texas, United States

IMSA SportsCar Championship career
- Debut season: 2021
- Current team: Winward Racing
- Categorisation: FIA Silver
- Car number: 57
- Starts: 55
- Wins: 15
- Podiums: 21
- Poles: 4
- Fastest laps: 3

Previous series
- 2018–2019 2018 2017–2021 2017–2020: International GT Open; GT World Challenge Asia; Michelin Pilot Challenge; 24H Series

Championship titles
- 2024 2025 2026: IMSA SportsCar Championship – GTD IMSA SportsCar Championship – GTD IMSA SportsCar Championship – GTD
- Statistics up to date as of 7 October 2026.

Russell Ward (born March 8, 1992) is an American racing driver who currently competes in the IMSA SportsCar Championship for Winward Racing. Ward also serves as Winward Racing's team principal.

Ward is a two-time class winner at the 24 Hours of Daytona and 12 Hours of Sebring. Alongside Philip Ellis, Ward has won the GTD class in the IMSA Sportscar Championship three years in a row, with the duo being crowned champions in 2024, 2025 and 2026.

== Career ==
Ward began his racing career in 2016 following several years competing in various track days alongside the ChampCar Endurance Series and 24 Hours of Lemons. For 2016, he embarked on a full season campaign in the Pirelli GT3 Cup Trophy USA with Kelly-Moss Road and Race, taking a podium finish in the final round at Circuit of the Americas. For 2017, Ward made his debut in the Continental Tire SportsCar Challenge, pairing with Damien Faulkner in a GS-class Porsche Cayman GT4 Clubsport fielded by CJ Wilson Racing. In the duo's opening race at Daytona, they finished third in the Grand Sport class; Ward's first podium in IMSA-sanctioned competition. Through ten races that season, Ward and Faulkner captured just the one podium, finishing eighth in the Grand Sport classification.

2018 saw Ward take part in a variety of series, with a particular focus on the Continental Tire SportsCar Challenge. Near the end of 2017, Winward joined forces with HTP Motorsport, paving the way for the team's transition to Mercedes-AMG machinery for 2018. Driving alongside Faulkner once again, the team claimed one podium through eight races, finishing 20th in the GS class standings. Ward also made one-off appearances in the Blancpain GT Series Asia, claiming a class victory and a podium finish, as well as the Pirelli World Challenge, International GT Open, DMV Gran Turismo Touring Car Cup, and 24H Series. In 2019, Ward scored his first victory in the renamed Michelin Pilot Challenge, pairing with Mercedes-AMG factory driver Dominik Baumann in the penultimate round of the season at Laguna Seca. Ward had missed the round at Road America following a crash in practice, relegating him to 16th in the overall standings. Two races in the 24H Series and a select few races in the International GT Open accompanied Ward's primary commitment in IMSA for 2019.

With Winward Racing's merger with HTP Motorsport at the end of 2019, Ward was set for a wide variety of racing opportunities in 2020. Launching another full-season campaign in the Michelin Pilot Challenge, Ward collected a pair of podiums, alongside his first pole position in the series at VIR, en route to his best ever points finish in the championship. Ward also took part in a part-time campaign in the GT World Challenge America, starting in the Pro/Am class with his father, Bryce, before jumping into the Silver Cup class for the rounds at Road America and Circuit of the Americas. Despite making just four starts in the Silver Cup, the lack of entries meant Ward was scored second in the season-long class championship. Ward also made his debut at the 24 Hours of Spa in October, taking second in the Silver Cup class alongside co-drivers Indy Dontje and Philip Ellis.

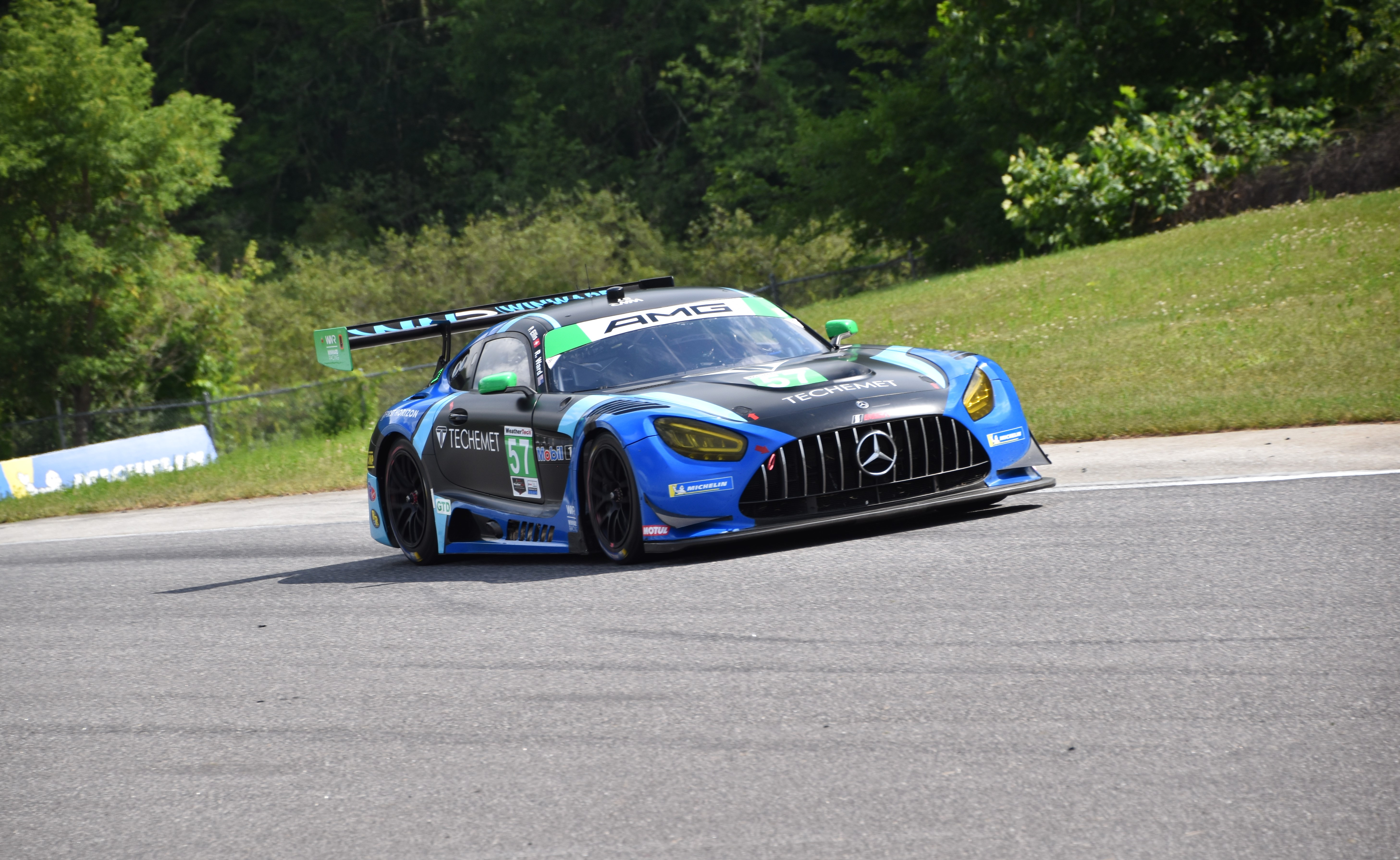
Ward competing in the IMSA SportsCar Championship in 2022

Ward began 2021 with his debut in the IMSA SportsCar Championship, joining Maro Engel, Indy Dontje, and Philip Ellis in the team's Mercedes-AMG GT3 Evo. In the team's first ever race in the championship, the 2021 24 Hours of Daytona, the quartet claimed class victory, taking Mercedes-AMG's first ever GTD class victory at the 24 Hours of Daytona. Ward also took part in a full-season effort for the 2021 GT World Challenge America, alongside a rotating driver lineup of Ellis and Mikaël Grenier. Grenier and Ward claimed the entry's sole race victory of the season, taking overall honors in the second race at VIR. Eight podium finishes was only enough to see Ward finish fourth in the Pro class championship, six points adrift of the Turner Motorsport duo of Robby Foley and Michael Dinan in third. A full-season effort in the GT World Challenge Europe Endurance Cup also featured in Ward's driving lineup, in which he claimed one podium through five races in the Silver Cup. As a result of his extensive exploits in Mercedes-AMG machinery during the 2021 calendar year, he was deemed the winner of the Pro-Driver GT3 category of the marque's brand-internal customer racing championship.

In October 2021, Ward announced Winward's plans to conduct a full-season campaign in the IMSA SportsCar Championship for 2022. After a slow start to the season, which included finishes outside of the top ten at Sebring, Long Beach, and Laguna Seca, the team initially believed that they'd claimed victory at Watkins Glen in June. However, the team ran afoul of IMSA's drive time restrictions and were demoted to 11th in class. The team suffered another near miss at Lime Rock, suffering a fuel pump failure on the final lap while leading. However, following three podiums in four races, two of which were back-to-back victories at Road America and Virginia International Raceway, the team entered the final round with an outside chance at scoring the GTD class championship. However, after an 11th-place finish at Petit Le Mans, Ward and season-long co-driver Philip Ellis settled for fifth in the points classification.

Ward complemented his IMSA endeavors with a part-time drive in the GT World Challenge America. After claiming a class victory at Watkins Glen, Ward and Ellis swept the weekend at Road America, marking three race victories in a row. At the end of 2022, Ward won Mercedes-AMG's Pro-Driver GT3 award, given to the most successful FIA-Platinum, Gold, or Silver rated driver in Mercedes-AMG's GT3 machinery over the course of the calendar year.

2023 saw Ward return full-time to the GT World Challenge Europe Endurance Cup, joining Ellis and Dontje in one of the team's two Gold Cup entries. The team claimed a sole Gold Cup podium at Barcelona, finishing seventh in the class championship. In IMSA competition, Ward claimed a GTD class victory at Indianapolis and an additional podium at VIR, finishing tenth in the championship.

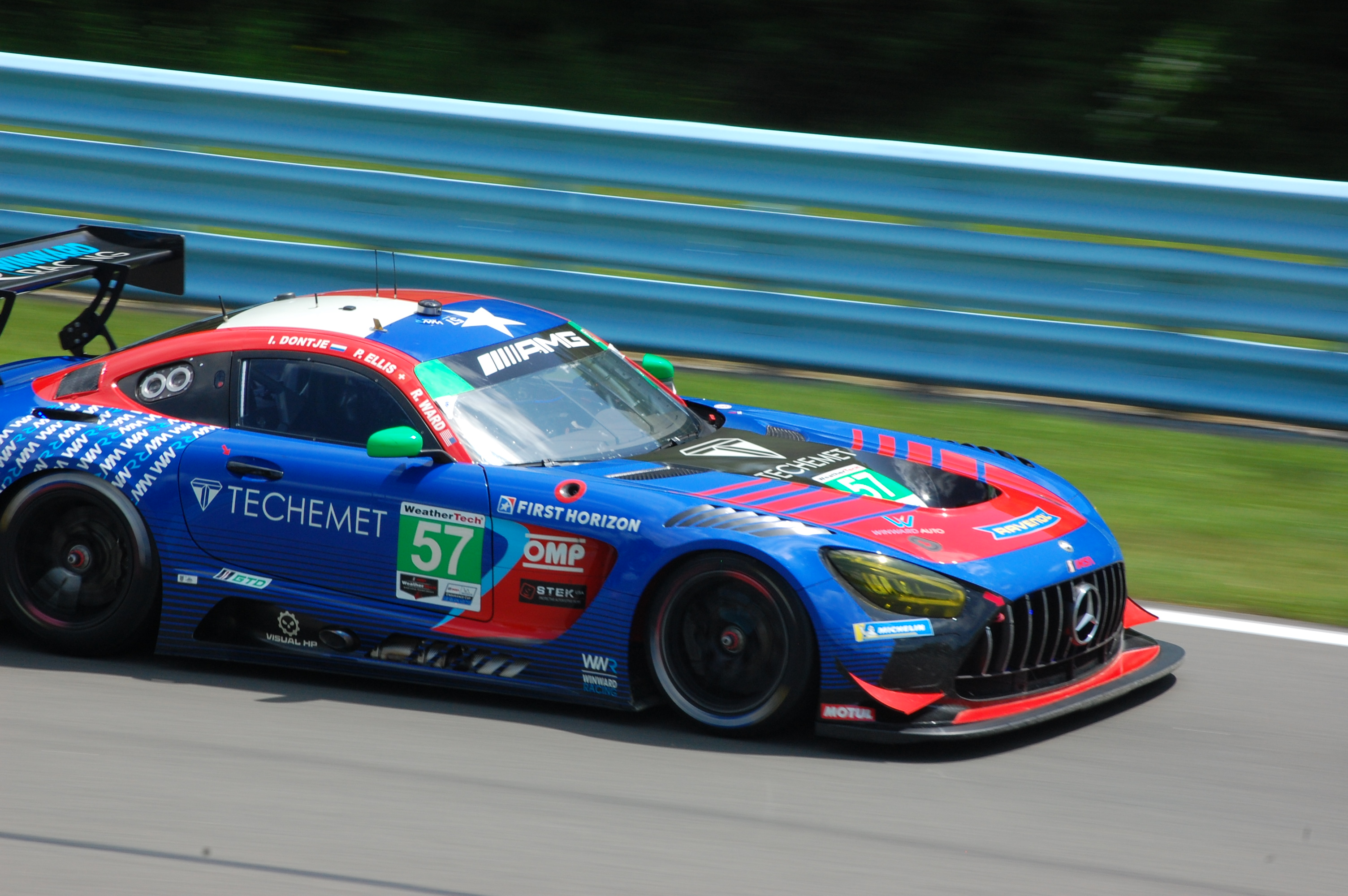
Ward at the 2025 6 Hours of The Glen

Ward downsized his 2024 driving program, focusing solely on his full-time seat in the IMSA SportsCar Championship, where he again teamed up with Ellis. The duo, joined by Dontje and Daniel Morad, scored their second career class victories at Daytona to kick off the season, before following it up with another victory at Sebring in March. After two races, Ward and Ellis sat 180 points clear of their next-closest full-time competitors. Two races later, Ward returned to victory lane at Laguna Seca, before following it up with his fourth victory of the season in the ensuing race at Watkins Glen. With a runner-up finish in the next race at Mosport, Ward and Ellis entered the final four races with a 340-point lead over the second-place team in GTD. Though they would only stand on the podium once in the final four races, the duo clinched the championship following an eighth-place finish at Petit Le Mans, the first of Ward's career. At the end of the year, Ward was honored at Mercedes-AMG's Customer Racing ceremony, where he was awarded the marque's Overall Pro Driver and Pro Driver GT3 awards for 2024.

In 2025, Ward returned to defend his GTD title in the IMSA SportsCar Championship, paired again with Ellis for the full season. A challenging Rolex 24 kicked off the year, with the team rebounded from a seven lap deficit early in the race to finish fourth in class. A late charge from Ellis saw the team take their second consecutive class victory at the 12 Hours of Sebring, and two races later the team claimed their second straight GTD victory at Laguna Seca. Later that year, Ward also returned to the 24 Hours of Spa after a year's absence, driving alongside Ellis and Dontje.

== Racing record ==
=== Career summary ===
Season	Series	Team	Races	Wins	Poles	F/Laps	Podiums	Points	Position
2016	Pirelli GT3 Cup Trophy USA	Kelly-Moss Road and Race	?	?	?	?	?	?	?
2017	Continental Tire SportsCar Challenge - GS	CJ Wilson Racing	10	0	0	0	1	231	8th
2017	24H Series - SP2	Mercedes-AMG Testteam Winward Racing/HTP Motorsport	1	0	0	0	0	?	?
2018	Blancpain GT Series Asia - GT4	GruppeM Racing Team	2	1	1	2	2	40	12th
2018	Continental Tire SportsCar Challenge - GS	Winward Racing/HTP Motorsport	8	0	0	0	1	151	20th
2018	International GT Open	Winward Racing/HTP Motorsport	2	0	0	0	0	0	NC†
2018	Pirelli World Challenge SprintX - GTS Pro-Am	Winward Racing	2	0	0	0	0	14	44th
2018	DMV Gran Turismo Touring Car Cup - Class 1	HTP Motorsport	4	0	0	0	3	?	?
2018	24H GT Series - GT4	Team RACE SCOUT by Winward/HTP Motorsport	2	0	0	0	0	?	?
2019	International GT Open	Winward Racing	6	0	0	0	0	14	22nd
2019	24H GT Series - GT4	Winward Racing	1	0	0	0	0	?	?
2019	Michelin Pilot Challenge - GS	Winward Racing/HTP Motorsport	8	1	0	0	1	147	16th
2019	24H GT Series - A6-Am	Winward Racing/HTP Motorsport	1	0	0	0	0	?	?
2020	GT World Challenge America - Silver	Winward Racing	4	0	1	1	4	72	**2nd**
2020	GT World Challenge America - Pro-Am	Winward Racing	3	0	1	0	0	28	10th
2020	Michelin Pilot Challenge - GS	Winward Racing/HTP Motorsport	10	0	1	0	2	224	7th
2020	GT World Challenge Europe Endurance Cup - Silver	HTP Motorsport	1	0	0	1	1	27	15th
2020	Intercontinental GT Challenge	HTP Motorsport	1	0	0	0	0	0	NC
2020	24H GT Series - GT3-Pro	HTP Winward Motorsport	1	0	0	0	0	?	?
2021	GT World Challenge America - Pro	Winward Racing	13	1	2	3	8	151	4th
2021	Michelin Pilot Challenge - GS	Winward Racing	8	0	0	1	2	1890	12th
2021	Intercontinental GT Challenge	Winward Racing	2	0	0	0	0	0	NC
2021	GT World Challenge Europe Endurance Cup - Silver	Winward Motorsport	5	0	0	0	1	32	15th
2021	IMSA SportsCar Championship - GTD	HTP Winward Motorsport	3	1	0	0	1	598	36th
2022	IMSA SportsCar Championship - GTD	Winward Racing	12	2	3	2	3	2714	5th
2022	GT World Challenge America - Pro	Winward Racing	7	3	2	2	6	154	6th
2022	GT World Challenge Europe Endurance Cup	Winward Racing	1	0	0	0	0	0	NC
2022	Intercontinental GT Challenge	Winward Racing	2	0	1	0	1	15	15th
2023	IMSA SportsCar Championship - GTD	Winward Racing	11	1	0	1	2	2562	10th
2023	GT World Challenge Europe Endurance Cup	Winward Racing	5	0	0	0	0	0	NC
2023	GT World Challenge Europe Endurance Cup - Gold Cup	Winward Racing	5	0	1	0	1	49	7th
2023	Le Mans Cup - GT3	Winward Racing	2	0	0	0	1	0	NC†
2023	Intercontinental GT Challenge	Winward Racing	1	0	0	0	0	1	30th
2024	IMSA SportsCar Championship - GTD	Winward Racing	10	4	0	0	6	3266	**1st**
2025	GT World Challenge Europe Endurance Cup	Winward Racing	1	0	0	0	0	0	NC
2025	IMSA SportsCar Championship - GTD	Winward Racing	10	3	0	0	4	3103	**1st**
2026	IMSA SportsCar Championship - GTD	Winward Racing	10	5	1	0	6	3078	**1st**

† Guest driver ineligible to score points.
^{*} Season still in progress.

=== Complete GT World Challenge Europe Endurance Cup results ===
Year	Team	Car	Class	1	2	3	4	5	6	7	Pos.	Points
2020	HTP Motorsport	Mercedes-AMG GT3 Evo	Silver	IMO	NÜR	SPA; 6H; 36	SPA; 12H; 27	SPA; 24H; 21	LEC		15th	27
2021	Winward Racing	Mercedes-AMG GT3 Evo	Silver	MNZ; 7	LEC; 20	SPA; 6H; 21	SPA; 12H; Ret	SPA; 24H; Ret	NÜR; 24	CAT; 29	15th	32
2022	Winward Racing	Mercedes-AMG GT3 Evo	Gold	IMO	LEC	SPA; 6H; 42	SPA; 12H; 32	SPA; 24H; 40	HOC	CAT	21st	12
2023	Winward Racing	Mercedes-AMG GT3 Evo	Gold	MNZ; 23	**LEC**; Ret	SPA; 6H; 56	SPA; 12H; 37	SPA; 24H; 38	NÜR; Ret	CAT; 15	7th	49
2025	Winward Racing	Mercedes-AMG GT3 Evo	Gold	LEC	MNZ	SPA; 6H; 26	SPA; 12H; 59†	SPA; 24H; Ret	NÜR	CAT	18th	5

=== Complete IMSA SportsCar Championship results ===
(key) (Races in bold indicate pole position)

Year	Team	Class	Make	Engine	1	2	3	4	5	6	7	8	9	10	11	12	Rank	Points
2021	HTP Winward Motorsport	GTD	Mercedes-AMG GT3 Evo	Mercedes-AMG M159 6.2 L V8	DAY; 1	SEB	MDO	DET	WGL	WGL	LIM	ELK	LGA	LBH	VIR	PET; 11	36th	598
2022	Winward Racing	GTD	Mercedes-AMG GT3 Evo	Mercedes-AMG M159 6.2 L V8	**DAY**; 6	SEB; 12	LBH; 14	**LGA**; 14	MDO; 5	DET; 10	WGL; 11	MOS; 2	LIM; 5	ELK; 1	VIR; 1	PET; 11	5th	2714
2023	Winward Racing	GTD	Mercedes-AMG GT3 Evo	Mercedes-AMG M159 6.2 L V8	DAY; 13	SEB; 18	LBH; 5	MON; 12	WGL; 20	MOS; 10	LIM; 9	ELK; 15	VIR; 3	IMS; 1	PET; 9		10th	2562
2024	Winward Racing	GTD	Mercedes-AMG GT3 Evo	Mercedes-AMG M159 6.2 L V8	DAY; 1	SEB; 1	LBH; 7	LGA; 1	WGL; 1	MOS; 2	ELK; 4	VIR; 3	IMS; 5	PET; 8			1st	3266
2025	Winward Racing	GTD	Mercedes-AMG GT3 Evo	Mercedes-AMG M159 6.2 L V8	DAY; 4	SEB; 1	LBH; 4	LGA; 1	WGL; 16	MOS; 2	**ELK**; 10	VIR; 1	IMS; 5	PET; 5			1st	3103
2026	Winward Racing	GTD	Mercedes-AMG GT3 Evo	Mercedes-AMG M159 6.2 L V8	DAY; 1	SEB; 18	LBH; 9	LGA; 5	WGL; 15	MOS; 1	ELK; 1	VIR; 1	IMS; 2	**PET**; 1			1st	3078

Sporting positions
Preceded by Phillip Ellis; Russell Ward	IMSA SportsCar Championship; GTD Champion; 2026; With: Philip Ellis	Succeeded by Incumbent
Preceded by Simon Mann; Alessandro Pier Guidi; Lilou Wadoux	Michelin Endurance Cup; GTD Champion; 2026; With: Philip Ellis & Indy Dontje	Succeeded by Incumbent
