= Winward Racing =

German auto racing team

(Germany) (United States) Winward Racing
- Founded: 2013
- Founder(s): Wim de Pundert; Reynier de Pundert
- Base: Altendiez, Rhineland-Palatinate, Germany; Houston, Texas, USA
- Team principal(s): Mickel Letter; Norbert Brückner; Christian Hohenadel
- Current series: Deutsche Tourenwagen Masters; 24 Hours of Nürburgring; Nürburgring Endurance Series; Michelin Pilot Challenge; IMSA SportsCar Championship; GT World Challenge Europe
- Former series: ADAC Formula 4 ADAC GT4 Germany; International GT Open; ADAC GT Masters; GT World Challenge America
- Current drivers: Full list
- Website: https://htp-winward.de/

Winward Racing, also known as HTP Motorsport and HTP Winward Motorsport, is a German-American-based auto racing team. The team mainly competes in GT3 based series such as the GT World Challenge Europe. The team was founded after HTP Investment BV took over Heico Motorsport.

== History ==
=== Background ===
Wim de Pundert was one of the founders of HTP Investment BV. Along with Klaas Meertens the duo bought, managed and sold various companies starting in 1990. The private equity company became more Germany focused when it acquired the Knaus Tabbert caravan manufacturers, Morelo Reisemobile caravan manufacturers and the Halberg-Guss foundry. It also owned Reum Kunststoff- und Metalltechnik GmbH which was sold to Grammer Interior Components in 2015.

=== 2007-2010: Early beginnings ===
The racing team was founded in 2007 when father Wim and son Reynier de Pundert bought two Formula Gloria tube framed single-seaters. Reynier finished 8th in the amateur championship. The team returned the following season with Reynier winning the championship while Wim run only a partial season. In 2008 the team also fielded Christiaan Frankenhout in the international Gloria Scouting Cup where he finished third. After the demise of the short-lived single-seater series, the team entered the Dutch Renault Clio Cup for 2009, 2010 and 2011. During the seasons Reynier de Pundert did not score a podium finish in the overall classification. In 2009 the team also joined Dutch GT4 with an Aston Martin Vantage for Junior Strous. Strous won one race and scored four podium finishes.

=== 2010-2012: Team HEICO Motorsport ===
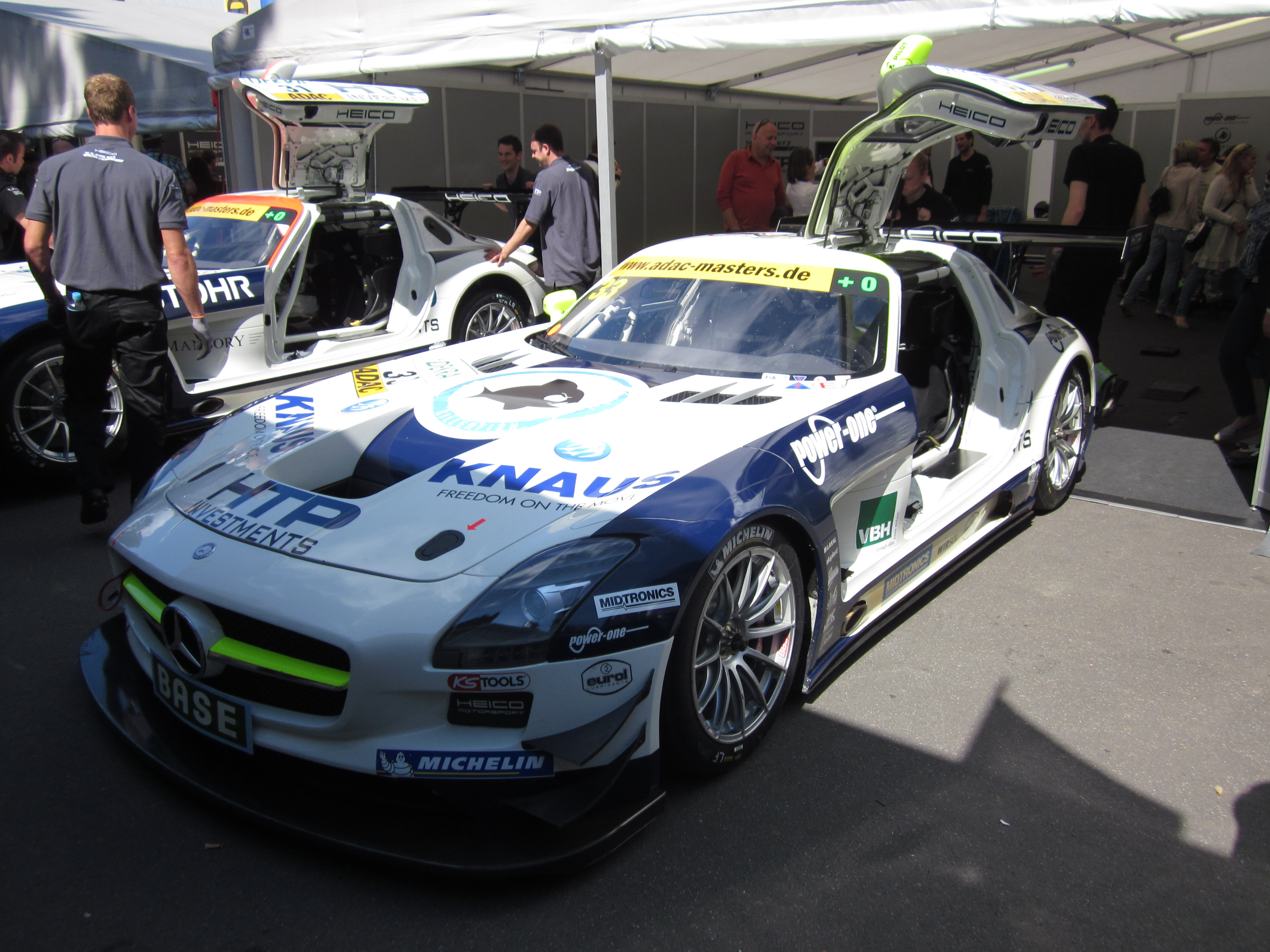
The HTP Investments sponsored Heico Motorsport Mercedes-Benz SLS AMG GT3.

Automotive tuning company Heico Sportiv ran racing cars since 1995. The German Volvo tuning company first entered a Volvo 850 in the 24 Hours of Nürburgring. The racing of various Volvo's ended in 2001 when the owners of Volvo, Premier Automotive Group, ended all customer and factory supported racing activities. Heico Sportiv restarted the racing programme for Volvo's, which were in-house developed, in 2007. The team focused on fuel efficiency with diesel and biofuel.

In late 2010 the team acquired two Mercedes-Benz SLS AMG GT3. The team eventually entered three SLS AMG's in the 2011 ADAC GT Masters. Austrians Dominik Baumann and Harald Proczyk were the best placed Heico Motorsport drivers. Baumann and Proczyk scored four podium finishes placing them fifth in the series championship. Baumann also competed in the 2011 FIA GT3 European Championship with teammate Brice Bosi. At Circuit Paul Ricard the team scored the first ever GT3 race win for an SLS AMG. Heico Motorsport continued in 2012 winning the team championship in the FIA GT3 European Championship. Working with Charouz Racing System Baumann and Maximilian Buhk won the team championship.

=== 2013-2014: HTP Motorsport ===
HTP Investment BV has had sponsorship agreements with Heico Motorsport since the team entered GT3 racing in 2011. HTP Investment BV took over Heico Motorsport at the beginning of 2013. Heico Motorsport team principal Norbert Brückner remained as the principal of the new team. Winning the 2013 24 Hours of Spa and the following 1000km of the Nürburgring this was enough for Buhk to secure the 2013 Blancpain Endurance Series championship. HTP Motorsport won the In 2014 the best result for HTP Motorsport in the Blancpain Endurance Series was a second place at the Nürburgring. The team was more successful in the 2014 ADAC GT Masters. Maxi Buhk and Maxi Götz won at Oschersleben and EuroSpeedway Lausitz. Götz won the 2014 Blancpain Sprint Series with HTP Motorsport.

=== 2015: Bentley factory programme and the HTP Junior Team ===
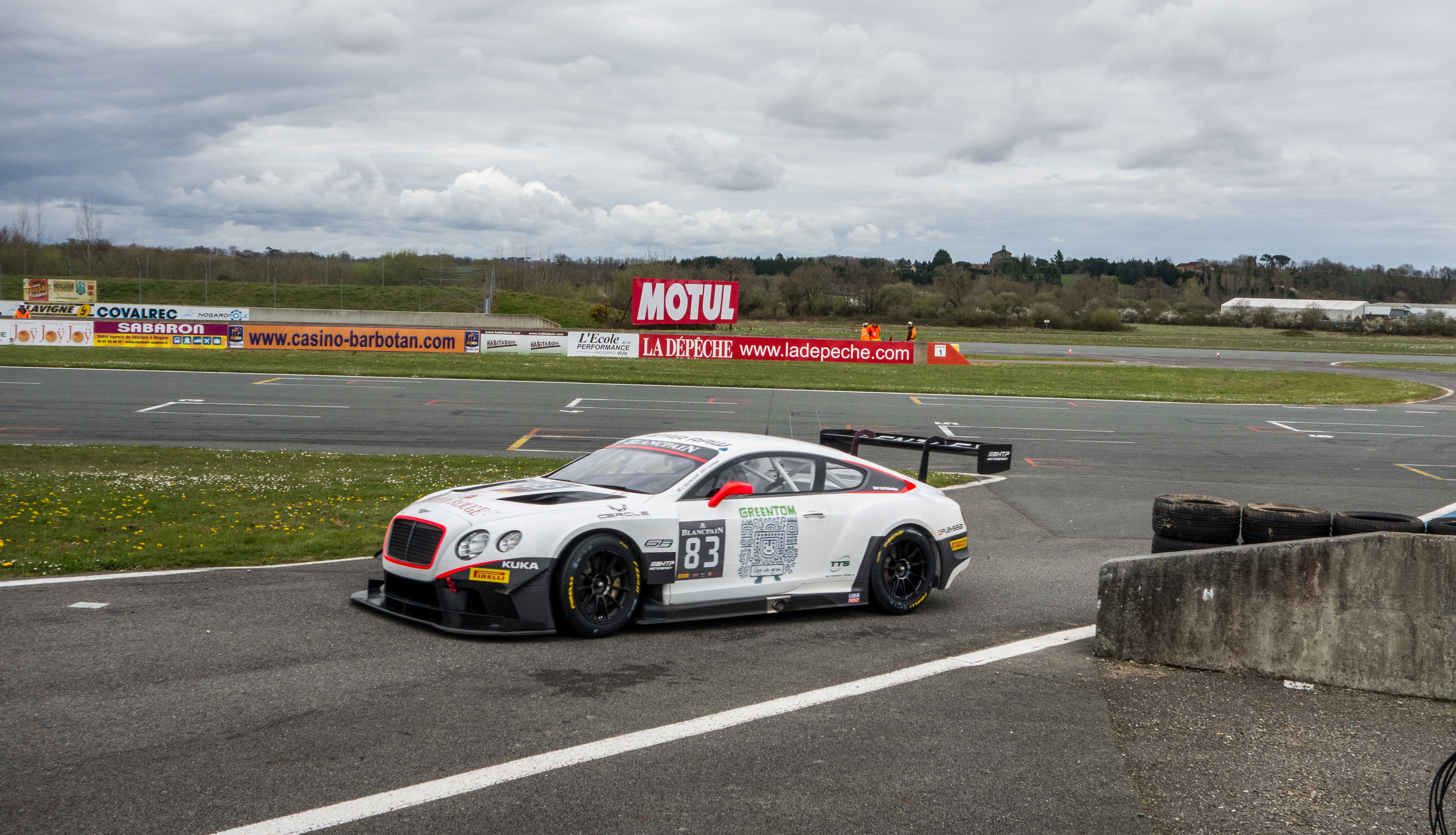
The Bentley Team HTP Bentley Continental GT3

The team switched manufacturer for the 2015 racing season. In December 2014 it was announced that Bentley selected HTP Motorsport to run one of their factory supported GT3 programs. The team entered five new Bentley Continental GT3 cars. The Blancpain Endurance Series was unsuccessful with a new driver line up failing to provide results. A ninth place at the 2015 24 Hours of Spa for Vincent Abril, Mike Parisy and Harold Primat was the team's best result in the Endurance Series. Abril partnered with Buhk in the 2015 Blancpain Sprint Series winning two qualifying races and two main races. Along with four more podium this was enough to secure the drivers championship. Fellow HTP Motorsport driver Jules Szymkowiak also won the Silver Cup classification. In the 2015 ADAC GT Masters the team won a single race with Luca Stolz and Jeroen Bleekemolen winning at Oschersleben.

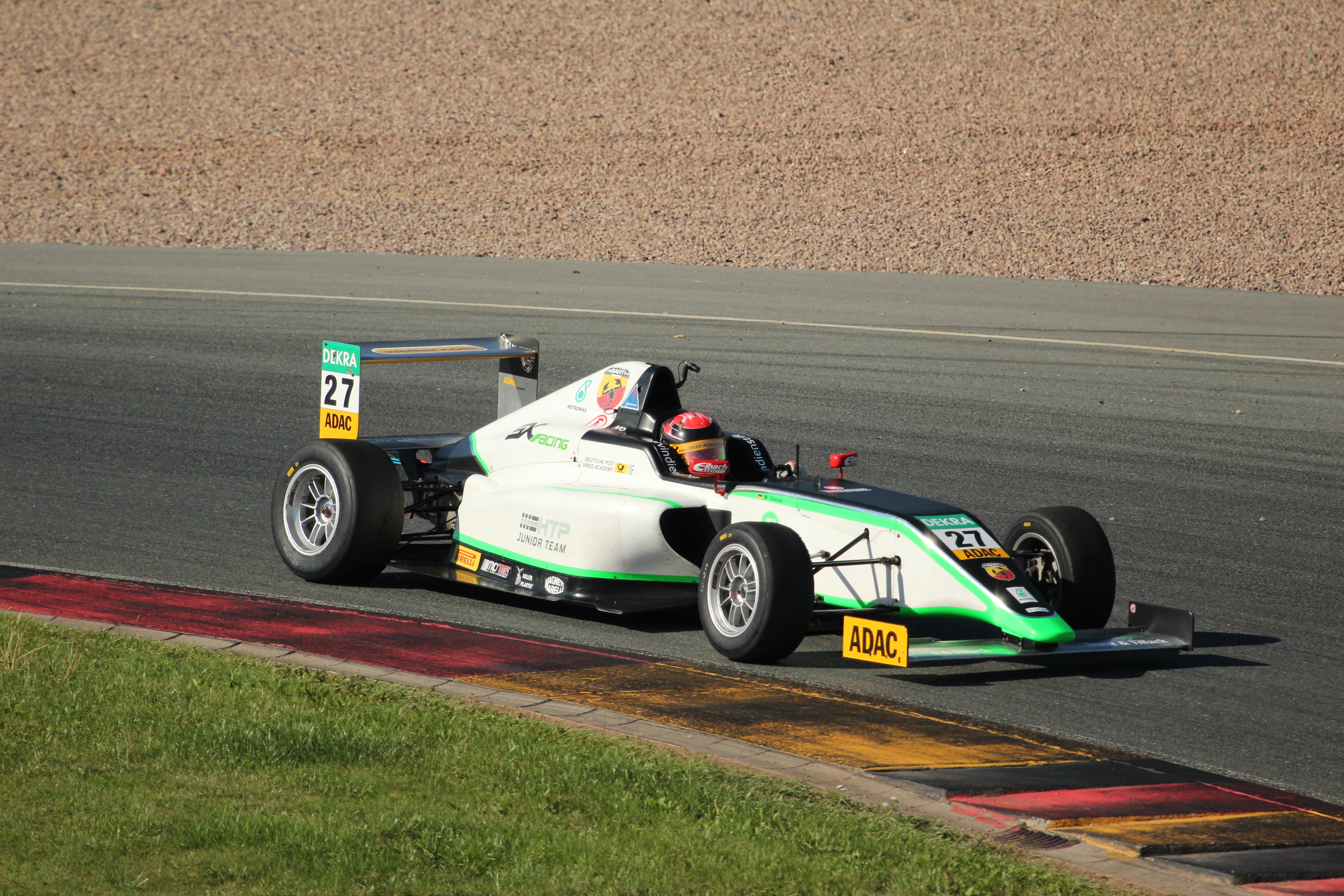
Marvin Dienst with HTP Junior Team at the Sachsenring.

When the ADAC Formel Masters transformed into the ADAC Formula 4 (in accordance with FIA Formula 4 regulations), HTP Motorsport entered three Tatuus F4-T014 cars. The team was run by Brückner and former HWA Team CEO Gerhard Ungar. Marvin Dienst and Jenneau Esmeijer raced the full 2015 season while Carrie Schreiner ran a partial season. Dienst won eight races and clinched the championship, while Esmeijer settled for seventh. At the end of 2015 Ralf Schumacher took over the role from Brücker renaming the team US Racing, ending the involvement from HTP Motorsport in ADAC Formula 4.

=== 2016–2017: Return to Mercedes-Benz ===
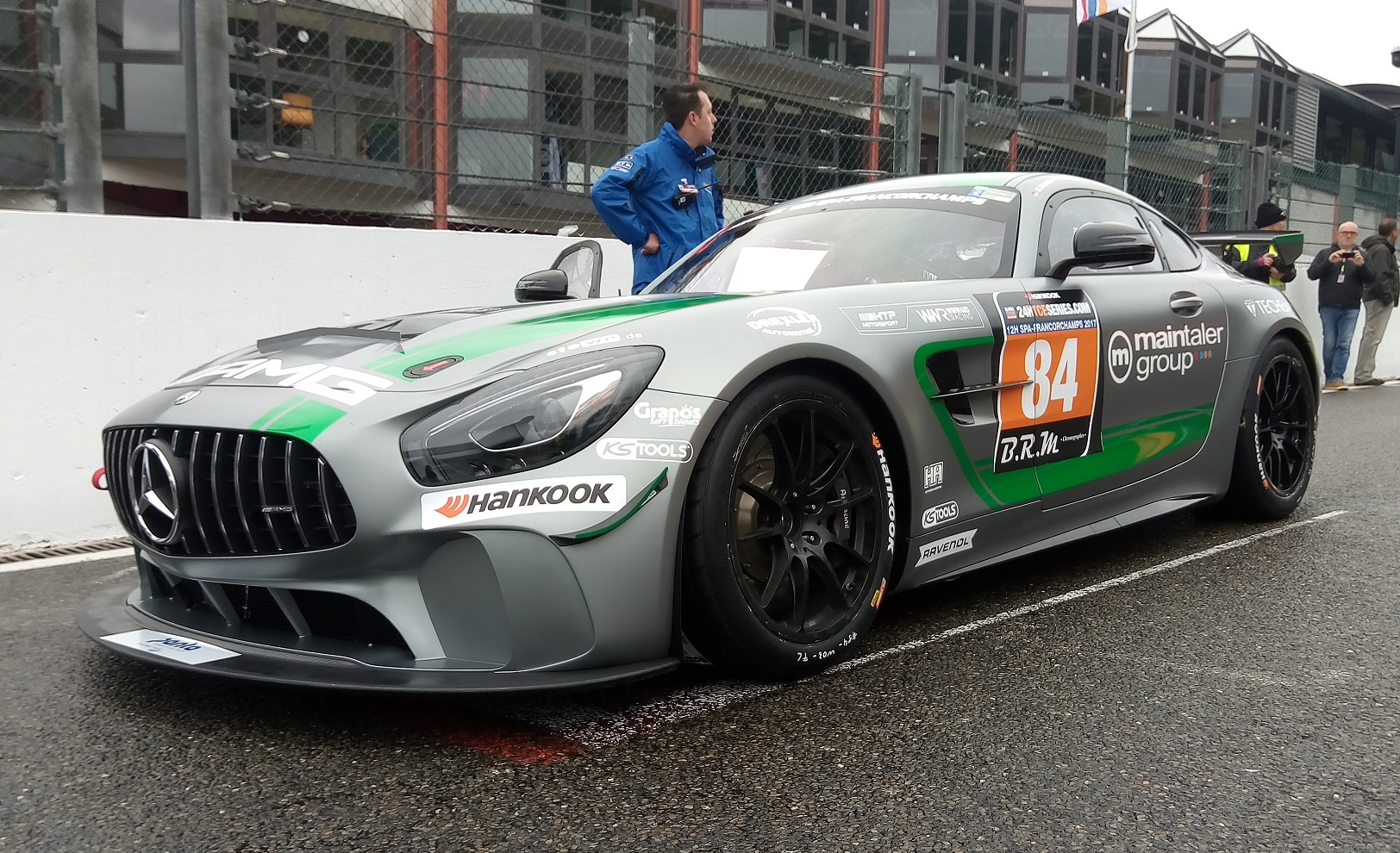
The Mercedes-AMG GT4 as raced by Dontje, Schneider and Viebahn as Spa.

The cooperation with Bentley lasted only one season. The team returned to Mercedes-Benz for 2016. The team entered four cars, in the Blancpain GT Series and at the 24 Hours of Nürburgring. The team opted not to continue in the ADAC GT Masters. Team owner Wim de Pundert also returned to the racing seat in the gentleman driver based 2016 Blancpain GT Sports Club. The return to Mercedes-Benz also meant new factory drivers joined the team such as Indy Dontje, Thomas Jäger and Christian Hohenadel. Former Mercedes-Benz factory drivers also returned such as Buhk and Baumann. Buhk and Baumann, joined by Jazeman Jaafar, won a single race at Silverstone in the newly introduced Mercedes-AMG GT3. In 2017 the team also returned to the ADAC GT Masters, but without notable results. In the Blancpain GT Endurance Cup Buhk, joined by Jimmy Eriksson and Franck Perera scored three podium finishes placing them third in the drivers championship.

HTP Motorsport was one of the teams selected by AMG Customer Racing to test the Mercedes-AMG GT4 in the 2017 Touring Car Endurance Series. Debuting at Circuit de Spa-Francorchamps, Dontje, Bernd Schneider and Jörg Viebahn suffered technical difficulties after running at the front early in the race.

=== 2017–2020: HTP Motorsport and Winward Racing ===
In 2017, HTP Motorsport continued its Mercedes-AMG GT3 programme in the Blancpain GT Series, with Maximilian Buhk, Jimmy Eriksson and Franck Perera scoring three podiums in the Endurance Cup and finishing third in the drivers' championship.

In 2018, HTP Motorsport won the ADAC GT Masters teams' championship with the MANN-FILTER Mercedes-AMG GT3 programme. Maximilian Götz, Markus Pommer, Maximilian Buhk and Indy Dontje all contributed to the team's successful campaign.

HTP Motorsport began working with the American Winward Racing organisation in 2017, initially competing together with Mercedes-AMG GT4 machinery in the IMSA Michelin Pilot Challenge. The partnership grew over the following seasons, and in 2019 the two organisations announced the creation of HTP Winward Motorsport, combining HTP's European experience with Winward's American operations.

The new HTP Winward Motorsport operation began competing in 2020, continuing programmes in the ADAC GT Masters and ADAC GT4 Germany. The team also returned to the GT World Challenge Europe, marking HTP Motorsport's return to the championship formerly known as the Blancpain GT Series. The programme further strengthened the team's presence in European GT3 racing.

=== 2021: International expansion and major successes ===
The 2021 season marked a major step in Winward Racing's international expansion. The team made its DTM debut with two Mercedes-AMG GT3s for Lucas Auer and Philip Ellis. Auer won two races and finished fifth in the drivers' championship, while Ellis claimed one victory and finished seventh. Winward Racing ended the season third in the teams' championship.

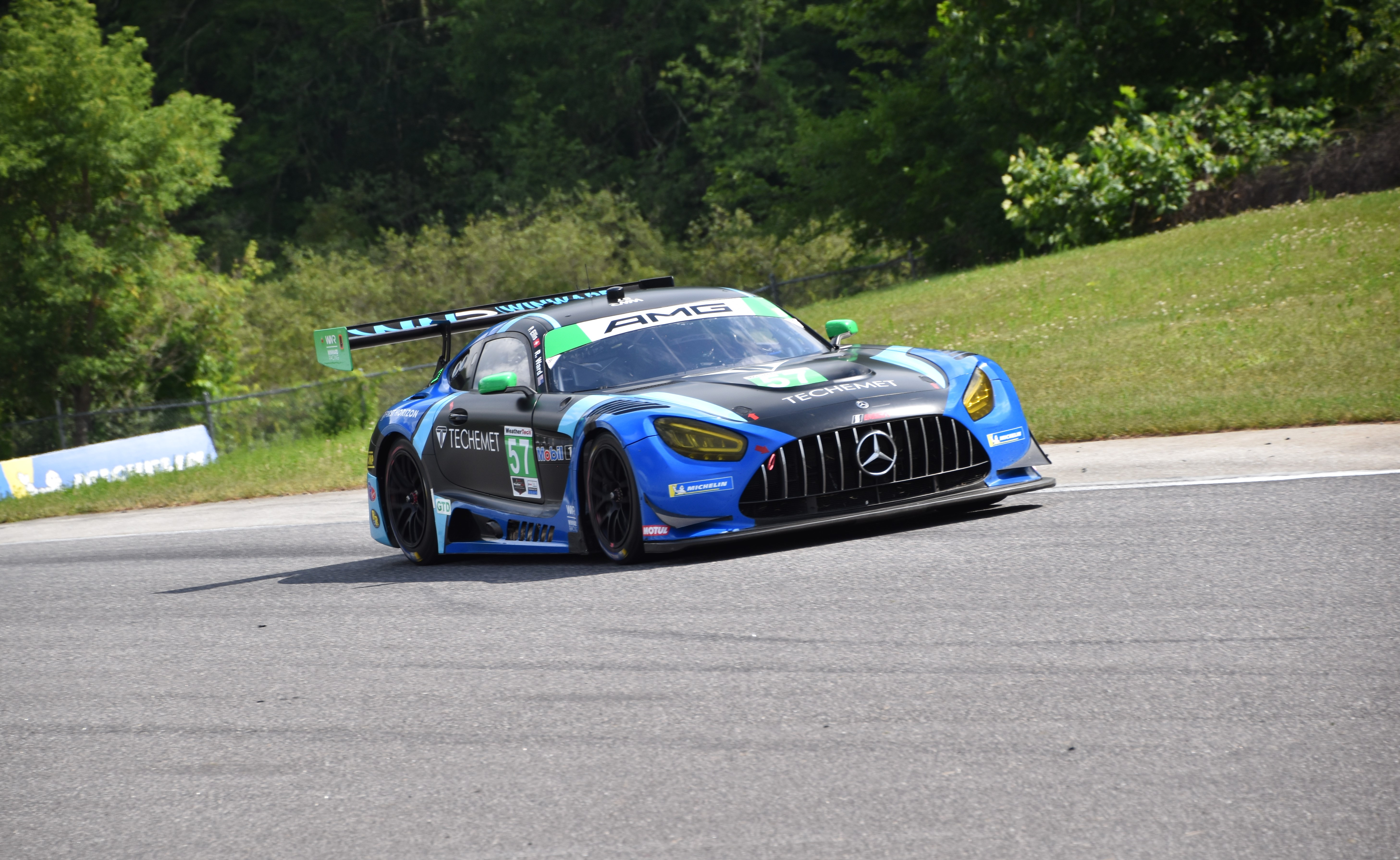
Philip Ellis with Winward Racing at the Lime Rock Park.

In North America, the team made its IMSA WeatherTech SportsCar Championship debut at the 24 Hours of Daytona, where the No. 57 Mercedes-AMG GT3 of Russell Ward, Philip Ellis, Indy Dontje and Maro Engel won the GTD class. Winward Racing also continued its programme in the GT World Challenge Europe Endurance Cup.

Following the expansion of its international programmes, the team ended its ADAC GT Masters and ADAC GT4 Germany programmes after the 2021 season, choosing to concentrate its resources on its newly established DTM programme, as well as its growing IMSA and GT World Challenge Europe activities.

=== 2022–2023: Consolidation in international GT racing ===
In 2022, Winward Racing continued its programmes in the IMSA WeatherTech SportsCar Championship and the GT World Challenge Europe. The No. 57 Mercedes-AMG GT3, driven primarily by Russell Ward and Philip Ellis, became a regular contender in the IMSA GTD class. The team scored several victories during the season, including wins at Virginia International Raceway and Road America, and remained in contention for the GTD championship until the finale.

In Europe, Winward Racing continued its GT World Challenge Europe programme with the No. 57 Mercedes-AMG GT3. Lucas Auer, Lorenzo Ferrari and Jens Liebhauser were among the drivers competing for the team during the Endurance Cup.

In 2023, Winward Racing continued to focus on its international GT3 programmes, particularly in IMSA and GT World Challenge Europe. The team continued to field the No. 57 Mercedes-AMG GT3 for Russell Ward, Philip Ellis and Indy Dontje in Europe, while also expanding its European presence with a second entry in the Gold Cup in GT World Challenge Europe Endurance Cup.

=== 2024: Championship success in IMSA and GT World Challenge Europe ===
The 2024 season was one of the most successful in Winward Racing's history. In the IMSA WeatherTech SportsCar Championship, the No. 57 Mercedes-AMG GT3 of Russell Ward and Philip Ellis, won the GTD Drivers' and Teams' Championships. The team also won the Rolex 24 at Daytona and the 12 Hours of Sebring, followed by a victory at the 6 Hours of Watkins Glen, securing the Michelin Endurance Cup titles in GTD. Mercedes-AMG also won the GTD manufacturers' championship.

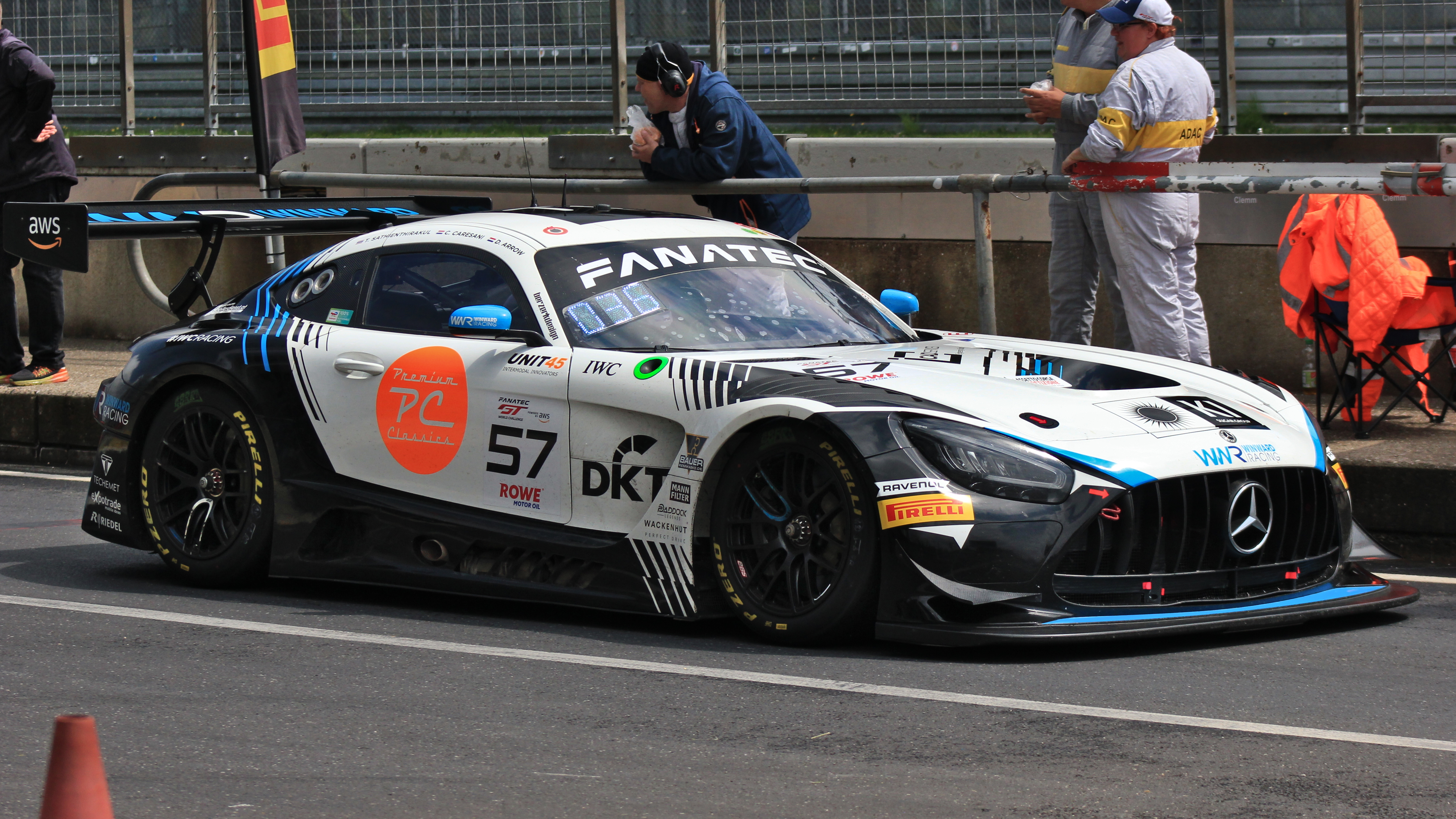
Colin Caresani with Winward Racing at the Nurburgring

In the GT World Challenge Europe, Winward Racing achieved major success with its MANN-FILTER programme. Maro Engel and Lucas Auer won the Overall Drivers' Championship, combining their results from the Sprint and Endurance Cups. The pair also secured the Sprint Cup Drivers' title with Winward Racing Team MANN-FILTER.

In the Endurance Cup, the No. 57 Mercedes-AMG GT3 of Colin Caresani, Daan Arrow and Tanart Sathienthirakul won both the Silver Cup Drivers' and Teams' Championships. The trio secured the title before the final round after a strong season of consistent results.

=== 2025: Back-to-back IMSA titles and continued international success ===
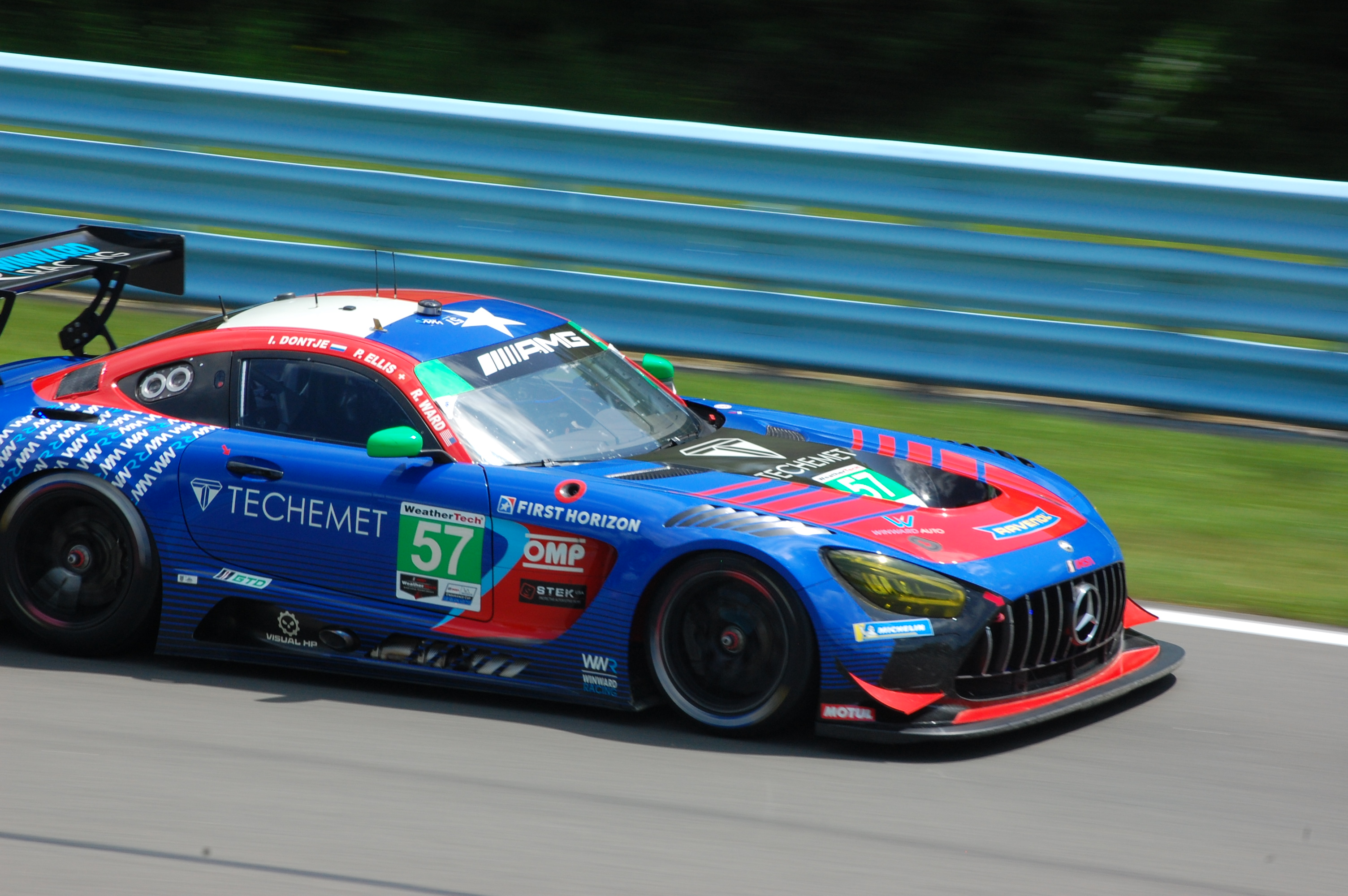
Russell Ward at the 2025 6 Hours of The Glen

The 2025 season confirmed Winward Racing's position among the leading Mercedes-AMG customer teams. In the IMSA WeatherTech SportsCar Championship, the No. 57 Mercedes-AMG GT3 of Russell Ward and Philip Ellis, joined by Indy Dontje for the endurance rounds, successfully defended the GTD Drivers' and Teams' Championships. The team continued to score victories and podiums throughout the season, strengthening its position as one of the leading GTD teams in North America.

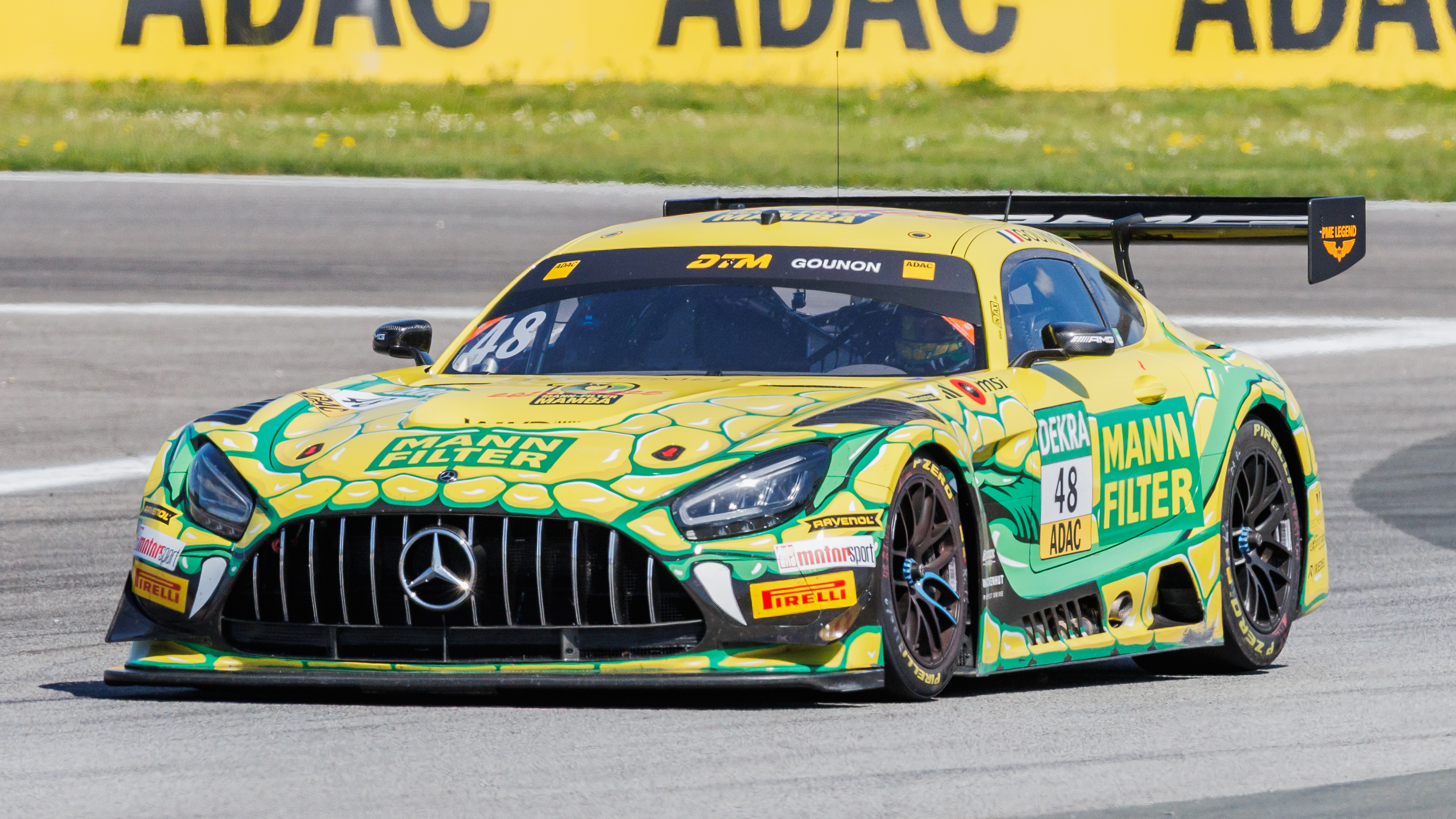
Gounon at Motorsport Arena Oschersleben in 2025

In the DTM, Winward Racing continued with Maro Engel and Jules Gounon. Engel enjoyed a strong campaign, finishing third in the drivers' championship with 184 points, while Gounon finished ninth. Winward Racing also finished third in the teams' championship, behind Manthey EMA and Schubert Motorsport.

In Europe, Winward Racing continued its involvement in the GT World Challenge Europe, maintaining its Mercedes-AMG GT3 programmes across the Sprint and Endurance Cups.

== Results & Achievements ==
=== Main Championship Titles ===
- ADAC Formula 4
  - Drivers’ Champion in 2015
- ADAC GT Masters
  - Teams’ Champion in 2018
- FIA GT3 European Championship
  - Overall Teams’ Champion in 2011 and 2012
  - Overall Drivers’ Champion in 2012
- GT World Challenge Europe Endurance Cup
  - Overall Teams’ Champion in 2026
  - Overall Drivers’ Champion in 2026
  - Silver Teams’ Champion in 2024
  - Silver Drivers’ Champion in 2024
- GT World Challenge Europe Sprint Cup
  - Overall Drivers’ Champion in 2014, 2015 and 2024
  - Silver Teams’ Champion in 2015 and 2017
  - Silver Drivers’ Champion in 2015 and 2017
  - Pro-Am Teams’ Champion in 2013
  - Pro-Am Drivers’ Champion in 2013
- GT World Challenge Europe
  - Overall Teams’ Champion in 2016
  - Overall Drivers’ Champion in 2016, 2024 and 2026
- IMSA SportsCar Championship
  - GTD Teams’ Champion in 2024, 2025 and 2026
  - GTD Drivers’ Champion in 2024, 2025 and 2026
  - GTD Teams’ Champion in Michelin Endurance Cup in 2024 and 2026
  - GTD Drivers’ Champion in Michelin Endurance Cup in 2024 and 2026
- Middle East Trophy
  - Overall Teams’ Champion in 2025
  - GT3 PRO-AM Teams’ Champion in 2025
  - GT3 PRO-AM Drivers’ Champion in 2025

=== Notable Victories ===
- Overall Winner - 2013 24 Hours of Spa-Francorchamps
- Overall Winner - 2013 6 Hours of Nürburgring
- Class Winner - 2019 24 Hours of Dubaï
- GTD Winner - 2021 24 Hours of Daytona
- GTD Winner - 2024 24 Hours of Daytona
- GTD Winner - 2024 12 Hours of Sebring
- GTD Winner - 2024 6 Hours of Watkins Glen
- Overall Winner - 2024 6 Hours of Jeddah
- GTD Winner - 2025 12 Hours of Sebring
- GTD Winner - 2026 24 Hours of Daytona
- Overall Winner - 2026 24 Hours of Nürburgring
- Overall Winner - 2026 6 Hours of Nürburgring
- GTD Winner - 2026 6 Hours of Road America
- GTD Winner - 2026 10 Hours of Petit Le Mans

== Current Drivers ==
Current series	Team	Car No.	Drivers
IMSA SportsCar Championship	Winward Racing	48	(United States) Scott Noble
IMSA SportsCar Championship	Winward Racing	48	(United States) Jason Hart
IMSA SportsCar Championship	Winward Racing	48	(Germany) Luca Stolz
IMSA SportsCar Championship	Winward Racing	48	(Belgium) Maxime Martin
IMSA SportsCar Championship	Winward Racing	57	(United States) Russell Ward
IMSA SportsCar Championship	Winward Racing	57	(Switzerland) Philip Ellis
IMSA SportsCar Championship	Winward Racing	57	(Netherlands) Indy Dontje
IMSA SportsCar Championship	Winward Racing	57	(Austria) Lucas Auer
Michelin Pilot Challenge	Winward Racing	57	(United States) Bryce Ward
Michelin Pilot Challenge	Winward Racing	57	(Netherlands) Daan Arrow
GT World Challenge Europe Endurance Cup	Mercedes-AMG Team Mann-Filter	48	(Germany) Maro Engel
GT World Challenge Europe Endurance Cup	Mercedes-AMG Team Mann-Filter	48	(Austria) Lucas Auer
GT World Challenge Europe Endurance Cup	Mercedes-AMG Team Mann-Filter	48	(Germany) Luca Stolz
GT World Challenge Europe Endurance Cup	Winward Racing	87	(Italy) Gabriele Piana
GT World Challenge Europe Endurance Cup	Winward Racing	87	(Germany) Marvin Dienst
GT World Challenge Europe Endurance Cup	Winward Racing	87	Rinat Salikhov
GT World Challenge Europe Sprint Cup	Mercedes-AMG Team Mann-Filter	48	(Germany) Maro Engel
GT World Challenge Europe Sprint Cup	Mercedes-AMG Team Mann-Filter	48	(Austria) Lucas Auer
GT World Challenge Europe Sprint Cup	Winward Racing	87	(Germany) Marvin Dienst
GT World Challenge Europe Sprint Cup	Winward Racing	87	Rinat Salikhov
Deutsche Tourenwagen Masters	Mercedes-AMG Team Mann-Filter	48	(Andorra) Jules Gounon
Deutsche Tourenwagen Masters	Mercedes-AMG Team Ravenol	80	(Germany) Maro Engel
Nürburgring Endurance Series	Mercedes-AMG Team Verstappen Racing	3	(Andorra) Jules Gounon
Nürburgring Endurance Series	Mercedes-AMG Team Verstappen Racing	3	(Austria) Lucas Auer
Nürburgring Endurance Series	Mercedes-AMG Team Verstappen Racing	3	(Spain) Daniel Juncadella
Nürburgring Endurance Series	Mercedes-AMG Team Verstappen Racing	3	(Netherlands) Max Verstappen
Nürburgring Endurance Series	Mercedes-AMG Team Ravenol	80	(Germany) Maro Engel
Nürburgring Endurance Series	Mercedes-AMG Team Ravenol	80	(Germany) Luca Stolz
Nürburgring Endurance Series	Mercedes-AMG Team Ravenol	80	(Belgium) Maxime Martin
Nürburgring Endurance Series	Mercedes-AMG Team Ravenol	80	(Germany) Fabian Schiller
Nürburgring Endurance Series	Mercedes-AMG Team Ravenol	80	(Estonia) Ralf Aron
Nürburgring Endurance Series	Mercedes-AMG Team Ravenol	80	(Germany) Jay Mo Härtling

== Current series results ==
=== Deutsche Tourenwagen Masters ===
Year	Car	Drivers	Races	Wins	Poles	F/Laps	Podiums	Points	D.C.	T.C.
2021	Mercedes-AMG GT3 Evo	(Austria) Lucas Auer	16	2	1	1	4	152	5th	3rd
2021	Mercedes-AMG GT3 Evo	(Switzerland) Philip Ellis	16	1	1	0	3	129	7th	3rd
2022	Mercedes-AMG GT3 Evo	(Austria) Lucas Auer	16	2	2	1	4	153	2nd	2nd
2022	Mercedes-AMG GT3 Evo	(Germany) David Schumacher	15	0	0	0	0	0	28th	2nd
2022	Mercedes-AMG GT3 Evo	(Germany) Maximilian Götz	16	0	0	1	1	74	11th	13th
2023	Mercedes-AMG GT3 Evo	(Austria) Lucas Auer	16	0	0	1	2	111	9th	9th
2023	Mercedes-AMG GT3 Evo	(Germany) David Schumacher	16	0	0	0	0	16	25th	9th
2024	Mercedes-AMG GT3 Evo	(Germany) Maro Engel	16	0	1	1	7	203	3rd	3rd
2024	Mercedes-AMG GT3 Evo	(Austria) Lucas Auer	16	0	0	0	1	116	10th	3rd
2025	Mercedes-AMG GT3 Evo	(Germany) Maro Engel	16	0	0	1	4	184	3rd	3rd
2025	Mercedes-AMG GT3 Evo	(Andorra) Jules Gounon	16	0	1	1	3	142	9th	3rd
2026	Mercedes-AMG GT3 Evo	(Germany) Maro Engel	16	3	2	3	6	213	2nd	2nd
2026	Mercedes-AMG GT3 Evo	(Andorra) Jules Gounon	16	0	1	0	1	111	10th	2nd

=== 24 Hours of Nürburgring ===
Year	Team	Car	Car No.	Drivers	Class	Laps	Overall Position	Class Position
2014	HTP Motorsport GmbH	Mercedes-Benz SLS AMG GT3	15	(Switzerland) Harold Primat (Germany) Maximilian Götz (Germany) Kenneth Heyer (Germany) Roland Rehfeld	SP9	156	7th	7th
2015	Bentley Team HTP	Bentley Continental GT3	11	(Switzerland) Harold Primat (Germany) Christopher Brück (Austria) Clemens Schmid (Austria) Marco Seefried	SP9	151	8th	8th
2016	AMG-Team HTP Motorsport	Mercedes-AMG GT3	29	(Germany) Christian Vietoris (Austria) Marco Seefried (Germany) Christian Hohenadel (Netherlands) Renger van der Zande	SP9	134	2nd	2nd
2016	AMG-Team HTP Motorsport	Mercedes-AMG GT3	30	(Germany) Dominik Baumann (Germany) Stefan Mücke (Germany) Maximilian Buhk	SP9	42	Ret.	Ret.
2016	AMG-Team HTP Motorsport	Mercedes-AMG GT3	31	(Germany) Maximilian Buhk (Germany) Stefan Mücke (Germany) Christian Hohenadel (Netherlands) Renger van der Zande	SP9	0	DNS	DNS
2017	Mercedes-AMG Team HTP Motorsport	Mercedes-AMG GT3	47	(Germany) Sebastian Asch (Austria) Dominik Baumann (Germany) Christian Hohenadel (Germany) Stefan Mücke	SP9	27	Ret.	Ret.
2017	Mercedes-AMG Team HTP Motorsport	Mercedes-AMG GT3	50	(Austria) Dominik Baumann (Germany) Maximilian Buhk (Italy) Edoardo Mortara (Sweden) Edward Sandström	SP9	155	Ret.	Ret.
2017	MANN-FILTER Team HTP Motorsport	Mercedes-AMG GT3	48	(Germany) Kenneth Heyer (Germany) Bernd Schneider (Netherlands) Indy Dontje (Germany) Patrick Assenheimer	SP9	155	14th	14th
2018	Mercedes-AMG Team Mann Filter	Mercedes-AMG GT3	47	(Italy) Edoardo Mortara (Austria) Dominik Baumann (Netherlands) Renger van der Zande (Spain) Daniel Juncadella	SP9	83	Ret.	Ret.
2018	Mercedes-AMG Team Mann Filter	Mercedes-AMG GT3	48	(Germany) Christian Hohenadel (Netherlands) Indy Dontje (Germany) Maximilian Götz (Netherlands) Renger van der Zande	SP9	129	17th	16th
2019	Mercedes-AMG Team Mann Filter	Mercedes-AMG GT3	48	(Germany) Christian Hohenadel (Germany) Lance David Arnold (Italy) Raffaele Marciello (Germany) Maximilian Götz	SP9	120	Ret.	Ret.
2026	Mercedes-AMG Team Verstappen Racing	Mercedes-AMG GT3 EVO	3	(Austria) Lucas Auer (Andorra) Jules Gounon (Spain) Daniel Juncadella (Netherlands) Max Verstappen	SP9 Pro	135	37th	19th
2026	Mercedes-AMG Team Ravenol	Mercedes-AMG GT3 EVO	80	(Germany) Maro Engel (Belgium) Maxime Martin (Germany) Fabian Schiller (Germany) Luca Stolz	SP9 Pro	156	1st	1st

=== 24 Hours of Spa ===
Year	Team	Car	Car No.	Drivers	Class	Laps	Overall Position	Class Position
2013	HTP Motorsport	Mercedes-Benz SLS AMG GT3	84	(Germany) Maximilian Buhk (Germany) Maximilian Götz (Germany) Bernd Schneider	Pro Cup	564	1st	1st
2014	HTP Motorsport	Mercedes-Benz SLS AMG GT3	84	(Switzerland) Harold Primat (Belgium) Nico Verdonck (Germany) Bernd Schneider	Pro Cup	518	9th	9th
2014	HTP Motorsport	Mercedes-Benz SLS AMG GT3	85	(Russia) Sergey Afanasyev (Netherlands) Stef Dusseldorp (Netherlands) Xavier Maassen	Pro Cup	52	Ret.	Ret.
2014	HTP Motorsport	Mercedes-Benz SLS AMG GT3	86	(Germany) Maximilian Buhk (Germany) Maximilian Götz (Malaysia) Jazeman Jaafar	Pro Cup	523	5th	5th
2015	Bentley Team HTP	Bentley Continental GT3	83	(Germany) Fabian Hamprecht (Belgium) Louis Machiels (Austria) Clemens Schmid (Netherlands) Max van Splunteren	Pro-Am Cup	150	Ret.	Ret.
2015	Bentley Team HTP	Bentley Continental GT3	84	(Switzerland) Harold Primat (France) Vincent Abril (France) Mike Parisy	Pro Cup	527	9th	9th
2016	HTP Motorsport	Mercedes-AMG GT3	84	(Austria) Dominik Baumann (Germany) Maximilian Buhk (Malaysia) Jazeman Jaafar	Pro Cup	529	6th	6th
2016	HTP Motorsport	Mercedes-AMG GT3	85	(United Kingdom) Luciano Bacheta (Netherlands) Indy Dontje (Austria) Clemens Schmid	Pro Cup	522	21st	21st
2016	HTP Motorsport	Mercedes-AMG GT3	86	(Germany) Maximilian Götz (Germany) Thomas Jäger (United Kingdom) Gary Paffett	Pro Cup	530	5th	5th
2017	MANN-FILTER Team HTP Motorsport	Mercedes-AMG GT3	48	(Netherlands) Indy Dontje (Germany) Patrick Assenheimer (Germany) Kenneth Heyer	Pro Cup	152	Ret.	Ret.
2017	Mercedes-AMG Team HTP Motorsport	Mercedes-AMG GT3	84	(Sweden) Jimmy Eriksson (Germany) Maxi Buhkr (France) Franck Perera	Pro Cup	142	Ret.	Ret.
2017	HTP Motorsport	Mercedes-AMG GT3	85	(Netherlands) Edward Sandström (Germany) Fabian Schillerr (Austria) Dominik Baumann	Pro Cup	545	7th	7th
2018	SunEnergy 1 Team HTP Motorsport	Mercedes-AMG GT3	175	(Australia) Kenny Habul (Germany) Thomas Jagër (Austria) Martin Konrad (Germany) Bernd Schneider	Pro-Am Cup	503	20th	3rd
2020	Team HTP Motorsport	Mercedes-AMG GT3 EVO	84	(Netherlands) Indy Dontje (Switzerland) Philip Ellis (United States) Russell Ward	Silver Cup	517	21st	2nd
2021	Winward Motorsport	Mercedes-AMG GT3 EVO	57	(Canada) Mikaël Grenier (Switzerland) Philip Ellis (United States) Russell Ward	Silver Cup	167	Ret.	Ret.
2022	Winward Racing	Mercedes-AMG GT3 EVO	57	(Austria) Lucas Auer (Italy) Lorenzo Ferrari (Germany) Jens Liebhauser (United States) Russell Ward	Gold Cup	429	40th	8th
2023	Winward Racing	Mercedes-AMG GT3 EVO	57	(Netherlands) Indy Dontje (Switzerland) Philip Ellis (United States) Russell Ward	Gold Cup	519	38th	4th
2023	Winward Racing	Mercedes-AMG GT3 EVO	157	(Switzerland) Miklas Born (Germany) David Schumacher (Germany) Marius Zug	Gold Cup	238	Ret.	7th
2024	Mercedes-AMG Team Mann-Filter	Mercedes-AMG GT3 EVO	48	(Austria) Lucas Auer (Germany) Maro Engel (Canada) Daniel Morad	Pro Cup	222	Ret.	Ret.
2024	Winward Racing	Mercedes-AMG GT3 EVO	57	(Netherlands) Daan Arrow (Netherlands) Colin Caresani (Thailand) Tanart Sathienthirakul	Silver Cup	473	28th	3rd
2025	Mercedes-AMG Team Mann-Filter	Mercedes-AMG GT3 EVO	48	(Austria) Lucas Auer (Germany) Maro Engel (Italy) Matteo Cairoli	Pro Cup	548	10th	10th
2025	Winward Racing	Mercedes-AMG GT3 EVO	57	(Netherlands) Indy Dontje (Switzerland) Philip Ellis (United States) Russell Ward	Gold Cup	219	Ret.	Ret.
2025	Winward Racing	Mercedes-AMG GT3 EVO	81	(Netherlands) Daan Arrow (Germany) Marvin Dienst (Italy) Gabriele Piana (Russia) Rinat Salikhov	Bronze Cup	546	17th	2nd
2026	Mercedes-AMG Team Mann-Filter	Mercedes-AMG GT3 EVO	48	(Austria) Lucas Auer (Germany) Maro Engel (Germany) Luca Stolz	Pro Cup	541	2nd	2nd
2026	Winward Racing	Mercedes-AMG GT3 EVO	87	(Netherlands) Daan Arrow (Germany) Marvin Dienst (Italy) Gabriele Piana (Russia) Rinat Salikhov	Bronze Cup	536	21st	4th

=== IMSA SportsCar Championship ===
Year	Entrant	Class	No	Chassis	Engine	Drivers	1	2	3	4	5	6	7	8	9	10	11	12	Pos.	Pts	MEC
2021	Winward Racing	GTD	57	Mercedes-AMG GT3 EVO	Mercedes-AMG M159 6.2 L V8	(United States) Russell Ward (United Kingdom) Philip Ellis (Germany) Maro Engel (Netherlands) Indy Dontje	DAY; 1	SEB	MOH	BEL	WGL1	WGL2	LIM	ELK	LGA	LBH	VIR	ATL; 11	18th	598	22
2022	Winward Racing	GTD	57	Mercedes-AMG GT3 EVO	Mercedes-AMG M159 6.2 L V8	(United States) Russell Ward (United Kingdom) Philip Ellis (Austria) Lucas Auer (Canada) Mikaël Grenier (Germany) Marvin Dienst	DAY; 6	SEB; 12	LBH; 14	LGA; 14	MOH; 5	BEL; 10	WGL; 11	MOS; 2	LIM; 5	ELK; 1	VIR; 1	ATL; 11	5th	2714	27
2023	Winward Racing	GTD	57	Mercedes-AMG GT3 EVO	Mercedes-AMG M159 6.2 L V8	(United States) Russell Ward (United Kingdom) Philip Ellis (Netherlands) Indy Dontje (Canada) Daniel Morad (Switzerland) Raffaele Marciello	DAY; 13	SEB; 18	LBH; 5	LGA; 12	WGL; 20	MOS; 10	LIM; 9	ELK; 15	VIR; 3	IMS; 1	ATL; 9		10th	2562	20
2024	Winward Racing	GTD	57	Mercedes-AMG GT3 EVO	Mercedes-AMG M159 6.2 L V8	(United States) Russell Ward (United Kingdom) Philip Ellis (Netherlands) Indy Dontje (Canada) Daniel Morad	DAY; 1	SEB; 1	LBH; 7	LGA; 1	WGL; 1	MOS; 2	ELK; 4	VIR; 3	IMS; 5	ATL; 8			1st	3266	41
2025	Winward Racing	GTD	57	Mercedes-AMG GT3 EVO	Mercedes-AMG M159 6.2 L V8	(United States) Russell Ward (United Kingdom) Philip Ellis (Netherlands) Indy Dontje (Austria) Lucas Auer	DAY; 4	SEB; 1	LBH; 4	LGA; 1	WGL; 16	MOS; 2	ELK; 10	VIR; 1	IMS; 5	ATL; 5			1st	3103	31
2026*	Winward Racing	GTD Pro	48	Mercedes-AMG GT3 EVO	Mercedes-AMG M159 6.2 L V8	(United States) Jason Hart (United States) Scott Noble (Germany) Luca Stolz (Belgium) Maxime Martin	DAY; 3	SEB; 12	LGA	DET	WGL	MOS	ELK	VIR	IMS	ATL			14th	512	15
2026*	Winward Racing	GTD	57	Mercedes-AMG GT3 EVO	Mercedes-AMG M159 6.2 L V8	(United States) Russell Ward (United Kingdom) Philip Ellis (Netherlands) Indy Dontje (Austria) Lucas Auer	DAY; 1	SEB; 18	LBH; 9	LGA; 5	WGL; 15	MOS; 1	ELK; 1	VIR; 1	IMS; 2	ATL; 1			1st	3078	40

^{*} Season still in progress.

=== Michelin Pilot Challenge ===
Year	Team	Car	Car No.	Drivers	Rounds	Races	Wins	Poles	F/Laps	Podiums	Points	Team Standings
2019	Winward Racing/HTP Motorsport	Mercedes-AMG GT4	33	(United States) Russell Ward	1–6, 8–10	7	1	1	0	1	129	19th
2019	Winward Racing/HTP Motorsport	Mercedes-AMG GT4	33	(Netherlands) Indy Dontje	1–6, 8, 10	7	1	1	0	1	129	19th
2019	Winward Racing/HTP Motorsport	Mercedes-AMG GT4	33	(Austria) Dominik Baumann	9	7	1	1	0	1	129	19th
2019	Winward Racing/HTP Motorsport	Mercedes-AMG GT4	57	(United States) Bryce Ward	All	10	0	0	0	0	131	18th
2019	Winward Racing/HTP Motorsport	Mercedes-AMG GT4	57	(Germany) Christian Hohenadel	1–6, 8–10	10	0	0	0	0	131	18th
2019	Winward Racing/HTP Motorsport	Mercedes-AMG GT4	57	(United States) Russell Ward	7	10	0	0	0	0	131	18th
2020	Winward Racing/HTP Motorsport	Mercedes-AMG GT4	4	(United States) Russell Ward	All	10	0	1	0	2	224	7th
2020	Winward Racing/HTP Motorsport	Mercedes-AMG GT4	4	(Netherlands) Indy Dontje	1–2, 4–6, 9	10	0	1	0	2	224	7th
2020	Winward Racing/HTP Motorsport	Mercedes-AMG GT4	4	(United States) Billy Johnson	3	10	0	1	0	2	224	7th
2020	Winward Racing/HTP Motorsport	Mercedes-AMG GT4	4	(Germany) Nico Bastian	7–8	10	0	1	0	2	224	7th
2020	Winward Racing/HTP Motorsport	Mercedes-AMG GT4	57	(United States) Bryce Ward	All	10	0	0	3	1	207	10th
2020	Winward Racing/HTP Motorsport	Mercedes-AMG GT4	57	(United Kingdom) Philip Ellis	1, 4–5, 9	10	0	0	3	1	207	10th
2020	Winward Racing/HTP Motorsport	Mercedes-AMG GT4	57	(United States) Alec Udell	2–3, 6–8	10	0	0	3	1	207	10th
2021	Winward Racing	Mercedes-AMG GT4	4	(Netherlands) Indy Dontje	1–5, 7–8	7	0	0	1	2	1890	10th
2021	Winward Racing	Mercedes-AMG GT4	4	(United States) Russell Ward	1–8	7	0	0	1	2	1890	10th
2021	Winward Racing	Mercedes-AMG GT4	4	(Canada) Mikaël Grenier	6	7	0	0	1	2	1890	10th
2021	Winward Racing	Mercedes-AMG GT4	57	(United States) Alec Udell	3–8	6	0	0	0	3	1510	15th
2021	Winward Racing	Mercedes-AMG GT4	57	(United States) Bryce Ward	3–8	6	0	0	0	3	1510	15th
2023	Winward Racing	Mercedes-AMG GT4	57	(Canada) Daniel Morad	1–6, 8–11	10	2	0	0	3	1770	14th
2023	Winward Racing	Mercedes-AMG GT4	57	(United States) Bryce Ward	1–6, 8–11	10	2	0	0	3	1770	14th
2024	Winward Racing	Mercedes-AMG GT4	57	(United States) Bryce Ward	All	10	0	0	1	4	2250	7th
2024	Winward Racing	Mercedes-AMG GT4	57	(Canada) Daniel Morad	1–8, 10	10	0	0	1	4	2250	7th
2024	Winward Racing	Mercedes-AMG GT4	57	(Switzerland) Philip Ellis	9	10	0	0	1	4	2250	7th
2025	Winward Racing	Mercedes-AMG GT4	57	(United States) Bryce Ward	All	10	0	0	2	1	1880	12th
2025	Winward Racing	Mercedes-AMG GT4	57	(Canada) Daniel Morad	1–6	10	0	0	2	1	1880	12th
2025	Winward Racing	Mercedes-AMG GT4	57	(Switzerland) Philip Ellis	7	10	0	0	2	1	1880	12th
2025	Winward Racing	Mercedes-AMG GT4	57	(Netherlands) Daan Arrow	8–10	10	0	0	2	1	1880	12th
2026	Winward Racing	Mercedes-AMG GT4	57	(United States) Bryce Ward	All	10	1	0	0	3	2070	6th
2026	Winward Racing	Mercedes-AMG GT4	57	(Netherlands) Daan Arrow	1-4, 6-10	10	1	0	0	3	2070	6th
2026	Winward Racing	Mercedes-AMG GT4	57	(Switzerland) Philip Ellis	5	10	1	0	0	3	2070	6th

=== Asian Le Mans Series ===
Year	Team	Class	Car	Car No.	Drivers	Rounds	Races	Wins	Poles	F/Laps	Podiums	Points	Drivers Standings	Teams/Cars Standings
2024-25	Winward Racing	LMGT3	Mercedes-AMG GT3 EVO	16	(Germany) Maro Engel	All	6	0	0	0	1	33	8th	8th
2024-25	Winward Racing	LMGT3	Mercedes-AMG GT3 EVO	16	(Russia) Viktor Shaytar	All	6	0	0	0	1	33	8th	8th
2024-25	Winward Racing	LMGT3	Mercedes-AMG GT3 EVO	16	(Russia) Sergey Stolyarov	All	6	0	0	0	1	33	8th	8th
2024-25	Winward Racing	LMGT3	Mercedes-AMG GT3 EVO	81	(Italy) Gabriele Piana	All	6	2	1	0	2	65	3rd	3rd
2024-25	Winward Racing	LMGT3	Mercedes-AMG GT3 EVO	81	(Russia) Rinat Salikhov	All	6	2	1	0	2	65	3rd	3rd
2024-25	Winward Racing	LMGT3	Mercedes-AMG GT3 EVO	81	(Andorra) Jules Gounon	1–2	2	1	0	0	1	35	7th	3rd
2024-25	Winward Racing	LMGT3	Mercedes-AMG GT3 EVO	81	(Germany) Luca Stolz	3–6	4	1	1	0	1	30	11th	3rd
2026-27	Winward Racing	LMGT3	Mercedes-AMG GT3 EVO	87	(Germany) Marvin Dienst									
2026-27	Winward Racing	LMGT3	Mercedes-AMG GT3 EVO	87	(Italy) Gabriele Piana									
2026-27	Winward Racing	LMGT3	Mercedes-AMG GT3 EVO	87	(Russia) Rinat Salikhov									

== Former series results ==
=== ADAC GT Masters ===
Year	Team	Car	Car No.	Drivers	Rounds	Races	Wins	Poles	F/Laps	Podiums	Points	D.C.	T.C.
2014	HTP Motorsport	Mercedes-Benz SLS AMG GT3	26	(Germany) Maximilian Buhk	1–5	10	2	0	0	4	90	10th	5th
2014	HTP Motorsport	Mercedes-Benz SLS AMG GT3	26	(Netherlands) Renger van der Zande	6	2	0	0	0	1	21	30th	5th
2014	HTP Motorsport	Mercedes-Benz SLS AMG GT3	26	(Germany) Maximilian Götz	1–6	12	2	0	1	6	136	5th	5th
2014	HTP Motorsport	Mercedes-Benz SLS AMG GT3	27	(Germany) Maximilian Götz	7–8	12	2	0	1	6	136	5th	5th
2014	HTP Motorsport	Mercedes-Benz SLS AMG GT3	27	(Germany) Luca Stolz	All	16	0	0	0	1	36	24th	5th
2014	HTP Motorsport	Mercedes-Benz SLS AMG GT3	27	(Germany) Heinz-Harald Frentzen	1–4	8	0	0	0	0	6	36th	5th
2014	HTP Motorsport	Mercedes-Benz SLS AMG GT3	27	(Austria) Mathias Lauda	5–6	4	0	0	0	0	5	38th	5th
2015	Bentley Team HTP	Bentley Continental GT3	7	(Germany) Luca Stolz	All	16	1	3	0	2	101	9th	6th
2015	Bentley Team HTP	Bentley Continental GT3	7	(Netherlands) Jeroen Bleekemolen	1–4	8	1	2	0	2	66	16th	6th
2015	Bentley Team HTP	Bentley Continental GT3	7	(France) Vincent Abril	5	2	0	0	0	0	6	34th	6th
2015	Bentley Team HTP	Bentley Continental GT3	7	(Germany) Maximilian Buhk	6	2	0	0	0	0	12	32nd	6th
2015	Bentley Team HTP	Bentley Continental GT3	7	(France) Tom Dillmann	7–8	4	0	0	1	0	17	30th	6th
2015	Bentley Team HTP	Bentley Continental GT3	8	(Germany) Fabian Hamprecht	All	16	0	0	0	2	52	19th	6th
2015	Bentley Team HTP	Bentley Continental GT3	8	(Austria) Clemens Schmid	All	16	0	0	0	2	52	19th	6th
2017	Mercedes-AMG Team HTP Motorsport	Mercedes-AMG GT3	48	(Netherlands) Indy Dontje **J**	All	14	0	0	0	2	66	13th	6th
2017	Mercedes-AMG Team HTP Motorsport	Mercedes-AMG GT3	48	(Germany) Marvin Kirchhöfer	All	13	0	0	0	2	60	15th	6th
2017	Mercedes-AMG Team HTP Motorsport	Mercedes-AMG GT3	48	(Germany) Maximilian Buhk	5	1	0	0	0	0	6	35th	6th
2017	Mercedes-AMG Team HTP Motorsport	Mercedes-AMG GT3	84	(Germany) Patrick Assenheimer **J**	All	14	0	0	0	1	60	16th	6th
2017	Mercedes-AMG Team HTP Motorsport	Mercedes-AMG GT3	84	(Germany) Maximilian Götz	All	14	0	0	0	1	60	16th	6th
2018	Mann-Filter Team HTP	Mercedes-AMG GT3	47	(Germany) Maximilian Götz	All	14	1	1	2	4	117	4th	1st
2018	Mann-Filter Team HTP	Mercedes-AMG GT3	47	(Germany) Markus Pommer	All	14	1	1	2	4	117	4th	1st
2018	Mann-Filter Team HTP	Mercedes-AMG GT3	48	(Germany) Maximilian Buhk	All	14	1	0	0	2	84	5th	1st
2018	Mann-Filter Team HTP	Mercedes-AMG GT3	48	(Netherlands) Indy Dontje **J**	All	14	1	0	0	2	84	5th	1st
2019	Mann-Filter Team HTP	Mercedes-AMG GT3	47	(Netherlands) Indy Dontje	All	14	1	1	0	3	145	3rd	4th
2019	Mann-Filter Team HTP	Mercedes-AMG GT3	47	(Germany) Maximilian Götz	All	14	1	1	0	3	145	3rd	4th
2019	Mann-Filter Team HTP	Mercedes-AMG GT3	48	(United Kingdom) Philip Ellis	All	14	0	0	0	1	40	21st	4th
2019	Mann-Filter Team HTP	Mercedes-AMG GT3	48	(Germany) Fabian Vettel **J**	All	14	0	0	0	1	40	21st	4th
2020	Mann-Filter - Team HTP-Winward	Mercedes-AMG GT3 Evo	47	(Netherlands) Indy Dontje	All	14	0	0	0	1	87	9th	10th
2020	Mann-Filter - Team HTP-Winward	Mercedes-AMG GT3 Evo	47	(Germany) Maximilian Götz	All	14	0	0	0	1	87	9th	10th
2020	Knaus - Team HTP-Winward	Mercedes-AMG GT3 Evo	48	(United Kingdom) Philip Ellis	All	14	1	0	1	2	112	6th	8th
2020	Knaus - Team HTP-Winward	Mercedes-AMG GT3 Evo	48	(Italy) Raffaele Marciello	All	14	1	0	1	2	112	6th	8th
2021	Mann-Filter Team Landgraf-HTP WWR	Mercedes-AMG GT3 Evo	70	(Germany) Maximilian Buhk	All	14	1	1	1	4	150	4th	5th
2021	Mann-Filter Team Landgraf-HTP WWR	Mercedes-AMG GT3 Evo	70	(Italy) Raffaele Marciello	All	14	1	1	1	4	150	4th	5th

=== ADAC Formula 4 ===
Year	Car	Drivers	Races	Wins	Poles	F/Laps	Podiums	Points	D.C.
2015	Tatuus F4-T014	(Germany) Marvin Dienst	24	8	7	6	14	347	**1st**
2015	Tatuus F4-T014	(Netherlands) Janneau Esmeijer	24	0	3	2	4	136	4th
2015	Tatuus F4-T014	(Germany) Carrie Schreiner	18	0	0	0	0	0	44th

==== In detail ====
(key) (Races in bold indicate pole position) (Races in italics indicate fastest lap)

ADAC Formula 4
Year	Car	No.	Drivers	OSC (Germany)			RBR (Austria)			SPA (Belgium)			LAU (Germany)			NÜR (Germany)			SAC (Germany)			OSC (Germany)			HOC (Germany)			Pos.	Pts
2015	Tatuus F4-T014 (Abarth)	27	(Germany) Marvin Dienst	1	**1**	6	Ret	3	20	Ret	6	14	**3**	**6**	1	1	1	3	**1**	**1**	2	2	2	4	**1**	**4**	Ret	1st	347
2015	Tatuus F4-T014 (Abarth)	28	(Netherlands) Janneau Esmeijer	**Ret**	2	Ret	9	6	2	8	8	12	13	4	Ret	**2**	**2**	4	24	Ret	9	**13**	**24**	6	11	Ret	4	7th	136
2015	Tatuus F4-T014 (Abarth)	35	(Germany) Carrie Schreiner				DNQ	DNQ	DNQ	30	33	27	19	19	Ret	28	26	29	19	24	17	29	15	Ret	Ret	15	21	44th	0

=== 24 Hours of Dubai ===
Year	Team	Car	Car No.	Drivers	Class	Laps	Overall Position	Class Position
2017	HTP Motorsport	Mercedes-AMG GT3	25	(Netherlands) Wim de Pundert (Germany) Bernd Schneider (Germany) Carsten Tilke (Luxembourg) Brice Bosi	A6-AM	459	60th	7th
2018	HTP Motorsport	Mercedes-AMG GT3	25	(Austria) Alexander Hrachowina (Netherlands) Indy Dontje (Germany) Bernd Schneider (Luxembourg) Brice Bosi (Austria) Martin Konrad	A6-AM	592	9th	3rd
2018	Team RACE SCOUT by Winward / HTP Motorsport	Mercedes-AMG GT4	84	(United States) Russell Ward (United States) Bryce Ward (Germany) Christian Gebhardt (Argentina) Norberto Fontana (Germany) Bernd Schneider	GT4	342	Ret.	Ret.
2019	HTP Motorsport	Mercedes-AMG GT3	25	(Austria) Alexander Hrachowina (Austria) Martin Konrad (Germany) Bernd Schneider (Netherlands) Indy Dontje (Luxembourg) Brice Bosi	A6-AM	595	7th	1st
2020	HTP Winward Motorsport	Mercedes-AMG GT3	84	(Oman) Al Faisal Al Zubair (Germany) Maximilian Götz (Germany) Maximilian Buhk (Germany) Christopher Bruck (Netherlands) Indy Dontje	GT3-Pro	160	16th	16th
2025	Winward Racing	Mercedes-AMG GT3 EVO	16	(Italy) Gabriele Piana (Russia) Rinat Salikhov (Russia) Viktor Shaytar (Russia) Sergey Stolyarov	GT3-Pro Am	583	11th	3rd
2026	Winward Racing	Mercedes-AMG GT3 EVO	16	(Netherlands) Daan Arrow (Russia) Sergey Stolyarov (Germany) Maro Engel (Germany) Luca Stolz	GT3-Pro	600	3rd	3rd
2026	Winward Racing	Mercedes-AMG GT3 EVO	81	(Germany) Marvin Dienst (Italy) Gabriele Piana (Russia) Rinat Salikhov (Italy) Matteo Cairoli	GT3-Pro	181	Ret.	Ret.

=== Gulf 12 Hours ===
Year	Team	Car	Car No.	Drivers	Class	Laps	Overall Position	Class Position
2025	**Winward Racing**	Mercedes-AMG GT3 EVO	16	(Netherlands) Daan Arrow (Russia) Sergey Stolyarov (Germany) Maro Engel	Pro Cup	31	Ret.	Ret.
2025	**Winward Racing**	Mercedes-AMG GT3 EVO	81	(Germany) Marvin Dienst (Italy) Gabriele Piana (Russia) Rinat Salikhov	Pro Cup	343	5th	5th

== Timeline ==
Current series
GT World Challenge Europe	2013–2018, 2020–present
Michelin Pilot Challenge	2018–2021, 2023–present
IMSA SportsCar Championship	2021–present
Deutsche Tourenwagen Masters	2021–present
Nürburgring Endurance Series	2019, 2026–present
Asian Le Mans Series	2024–25, 2026-present
Former series
FIA GT3 European Championship	2011–2012
ADAC GT Masters	2011–2015, 2017–2021
FIA GT Series	2013
ADAC Formula 4	2015
24H Series	2016–2020
International GT Open	2018–2021
ADAC GT4 Germany	2020
GT World Challenge America	2019–2022
Le Mans Cup	2023
Gulf 12 Hours	2025
Middle East Trophy	2025, 2025–26

== Gallery ==
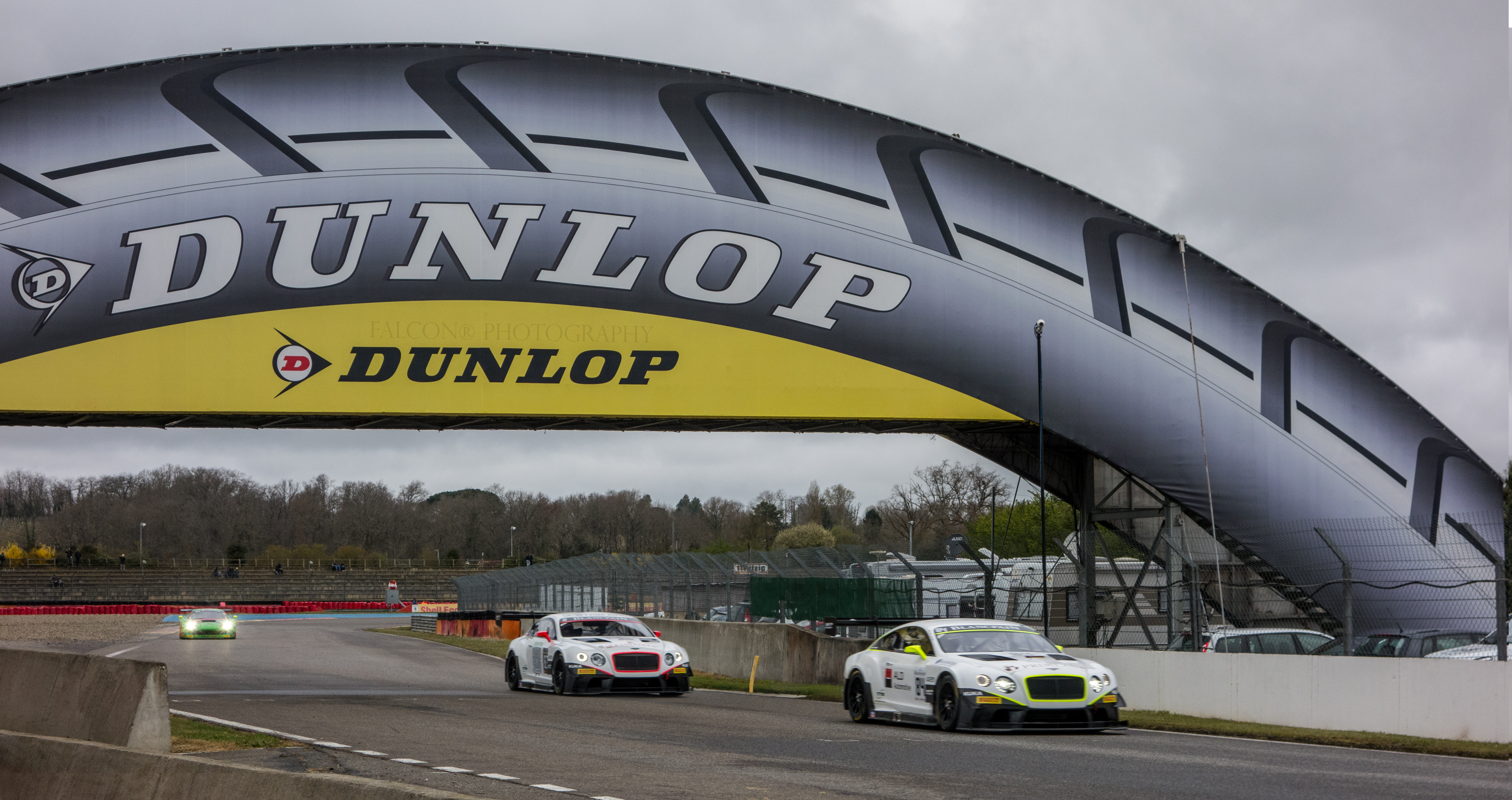
Two HTP Motorsport Bentley's at Nogaro 2015.

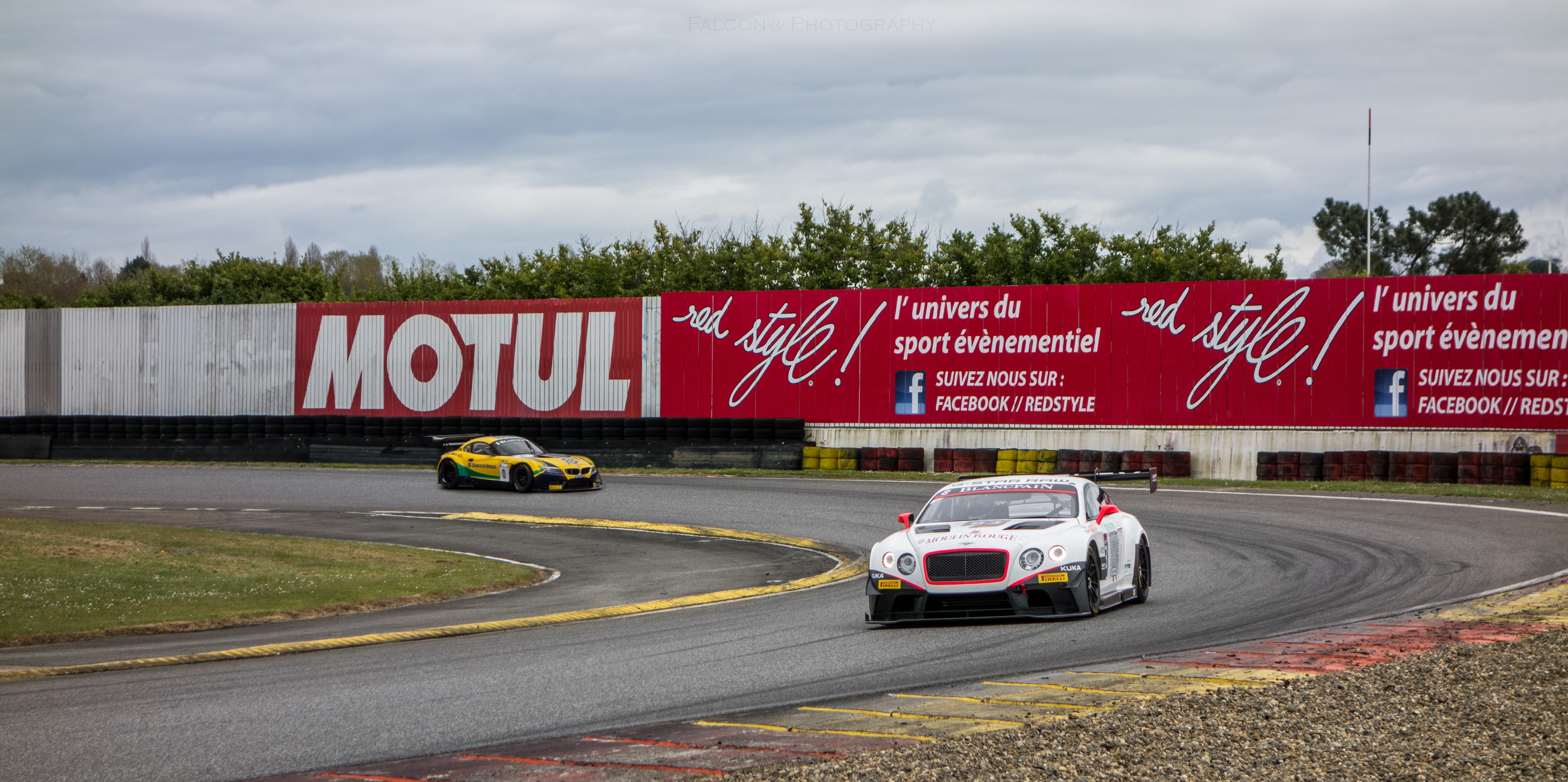
Bentley Team HTP at Nogaro 2015.

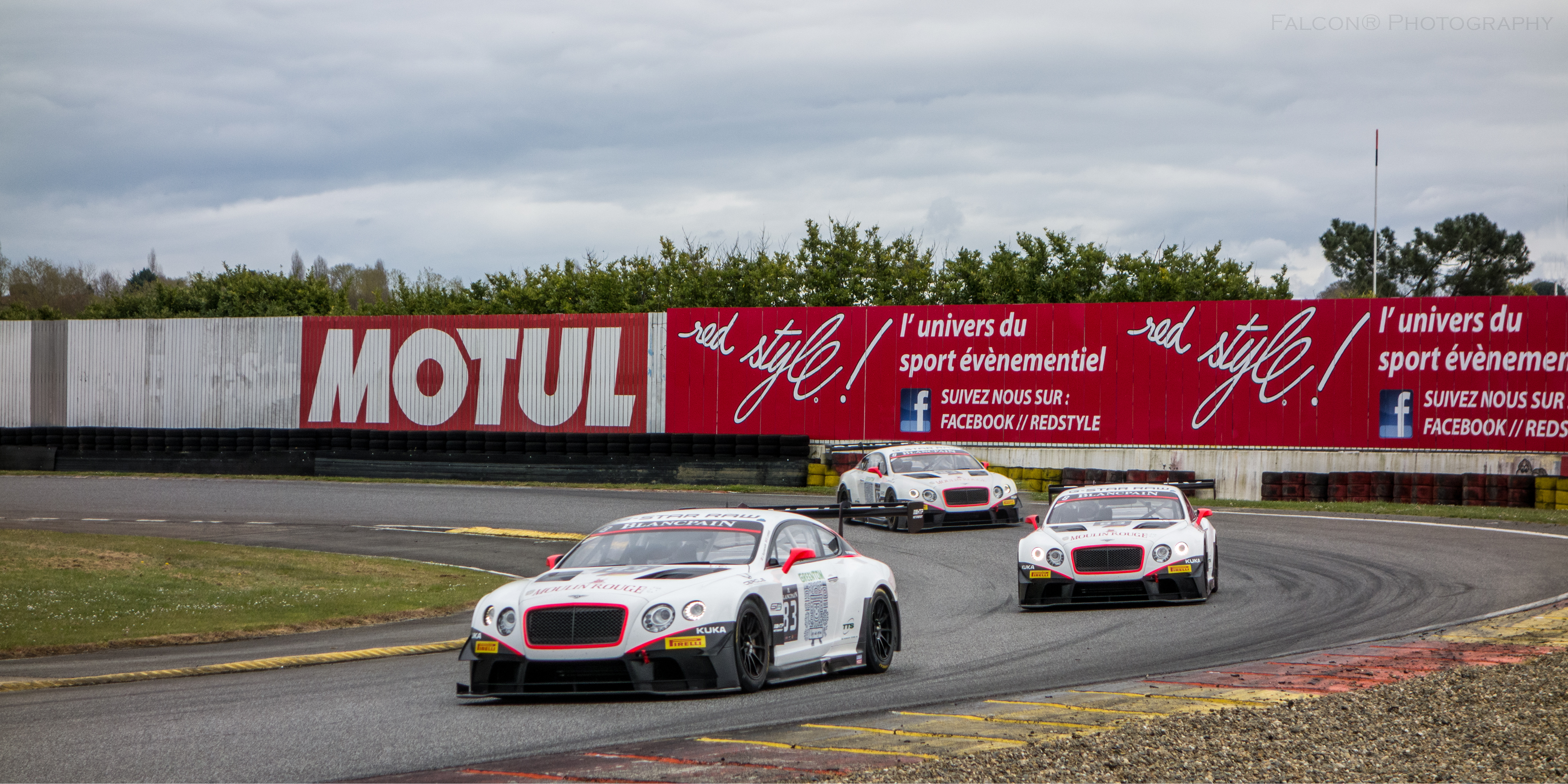
Bentley Team HTP at Nogaro 2015.

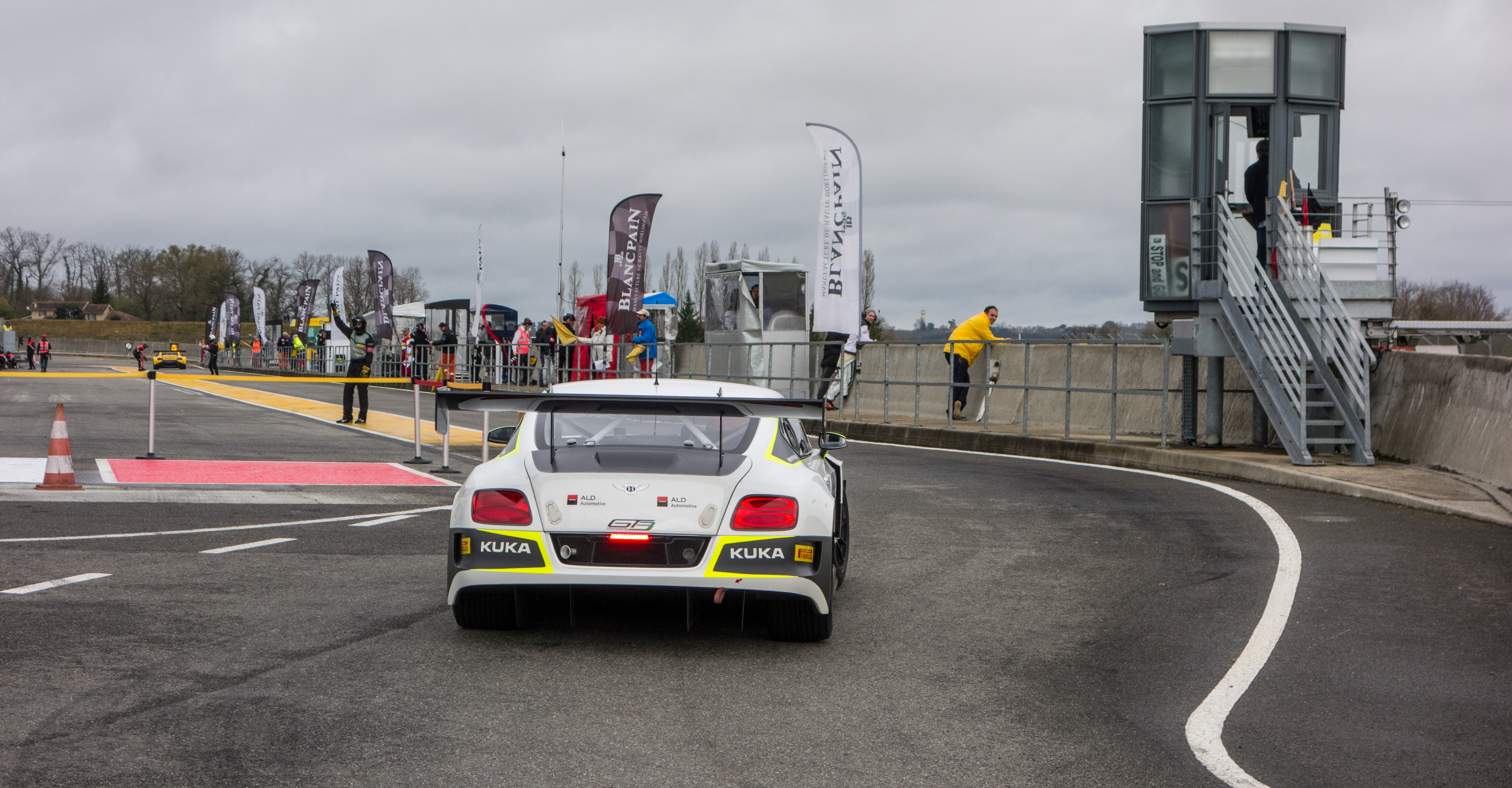
Bentley Team HTP at Nogaro 2015.

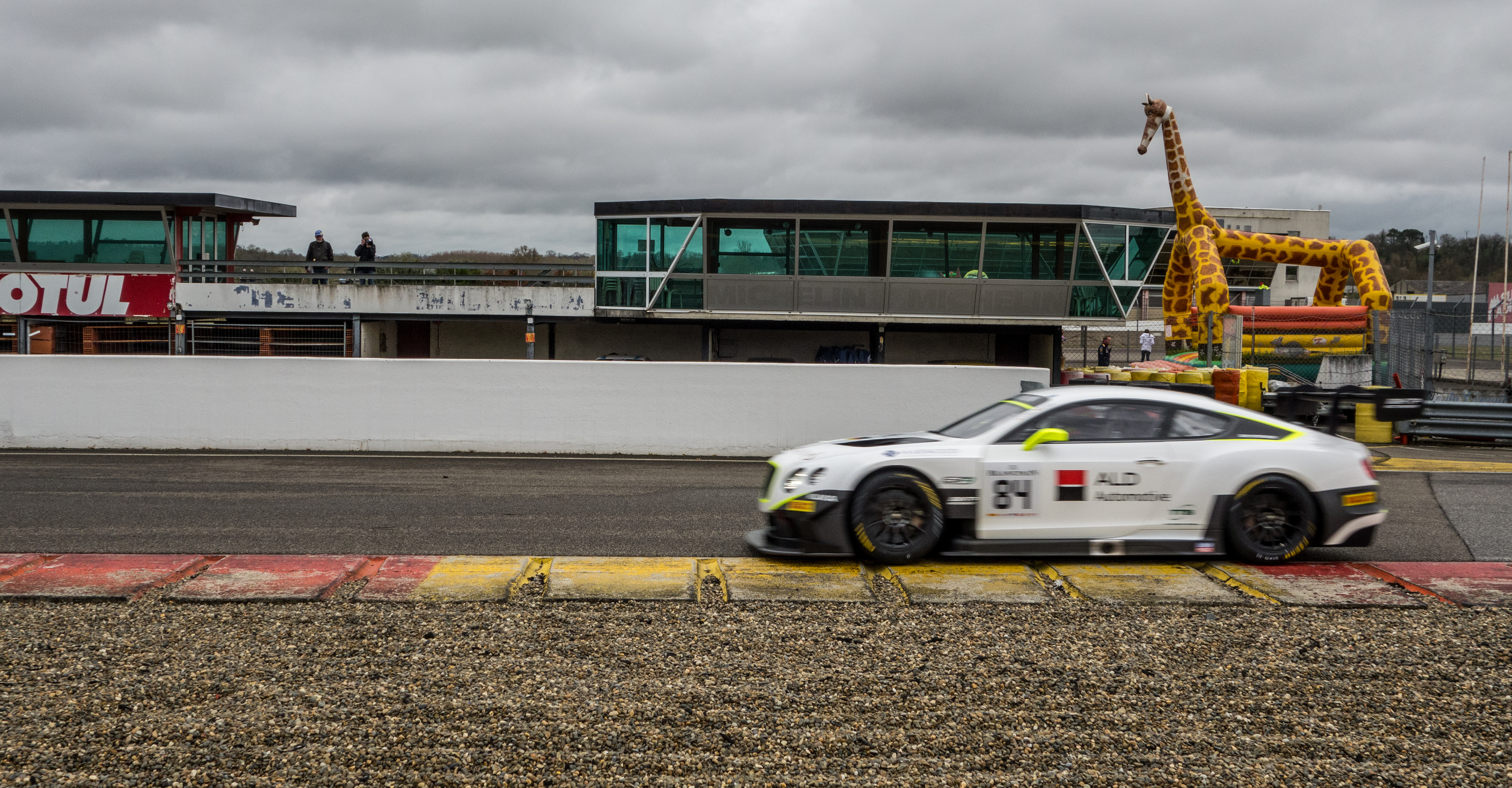
Bentley Team HTP at Nogaro 2015.

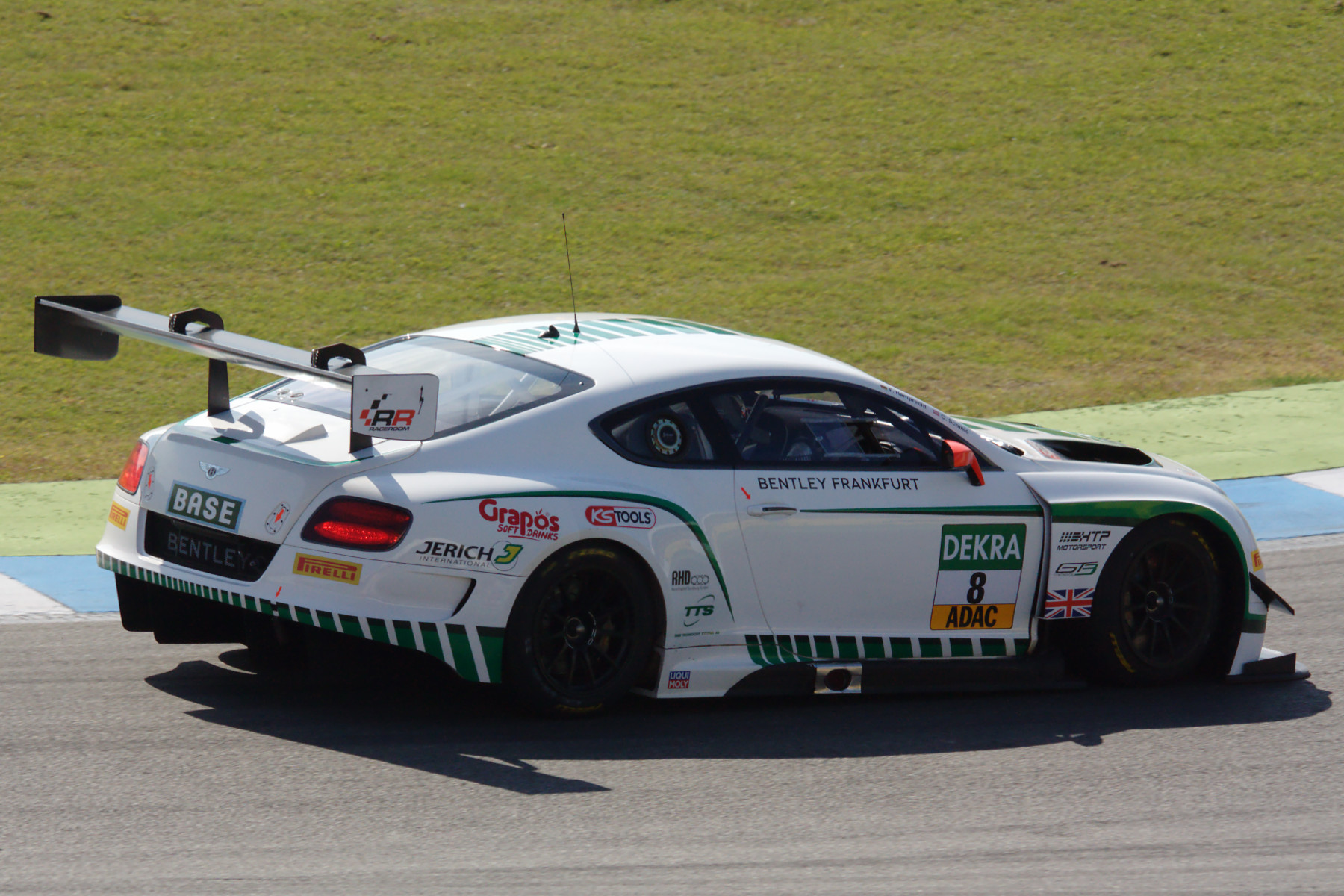
Hamprecht and Schmid at the Hockenheimring 2015.

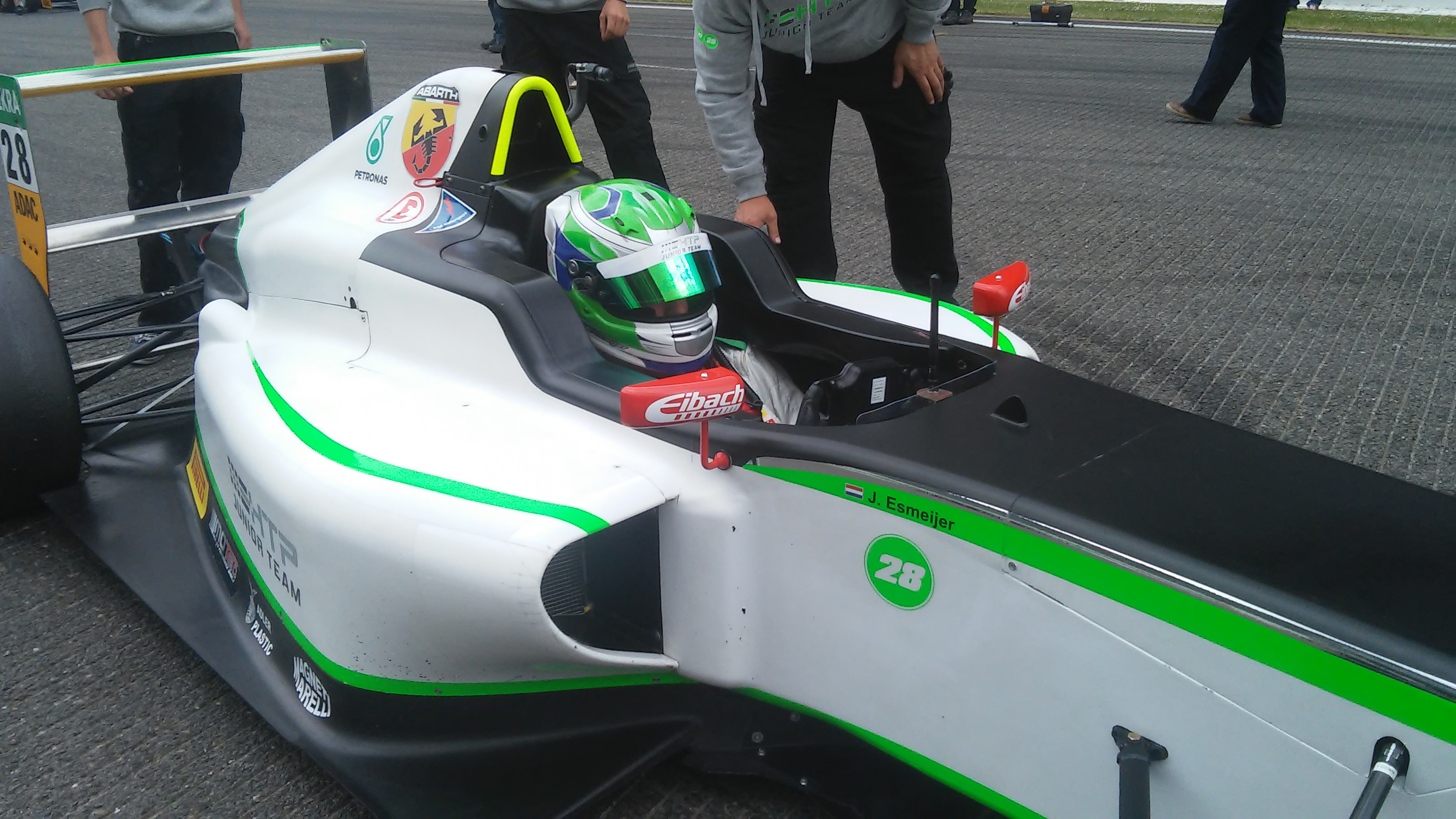
Janneau Esmeijer on the grid at Spa 2015.

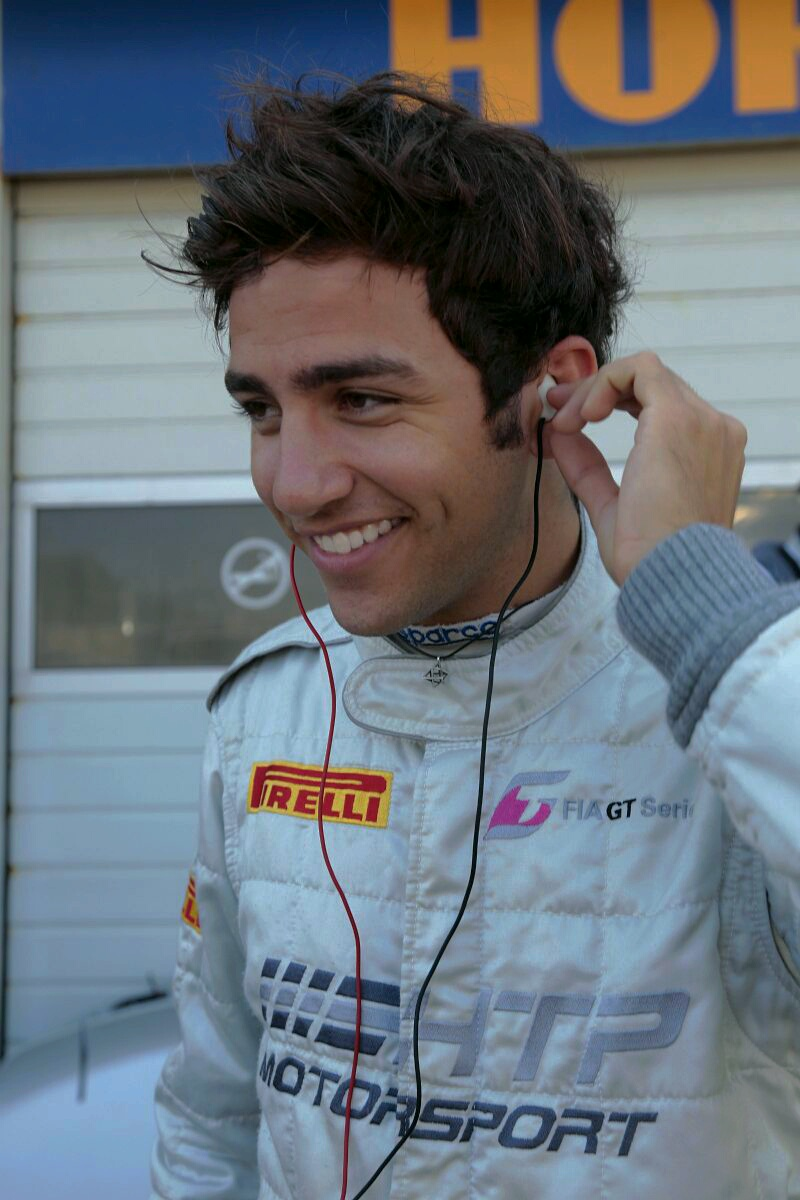
Former HTP Motorsport driver Alon Day in 2014.

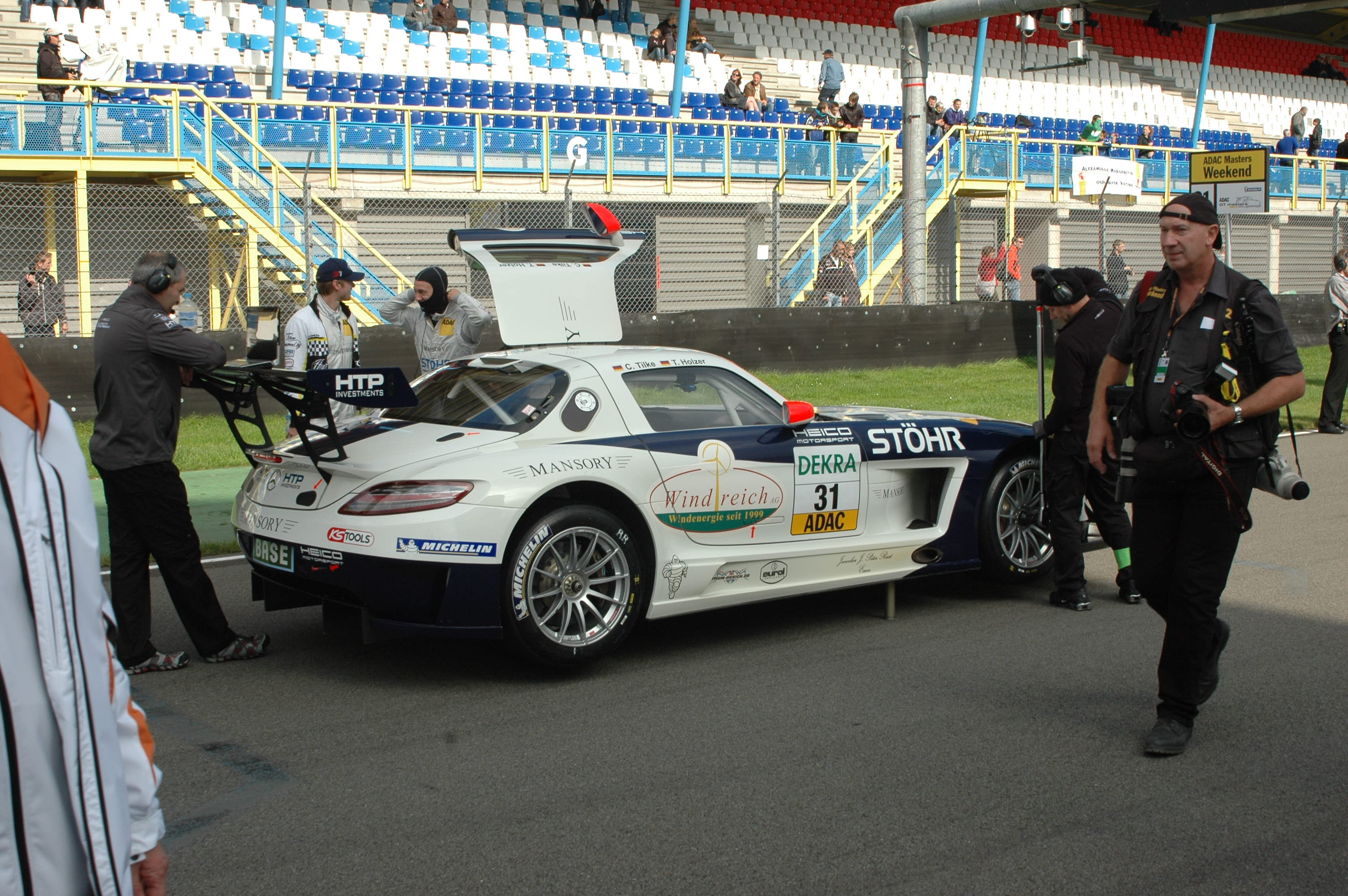
Heico Motorsports at Assen in 2011.

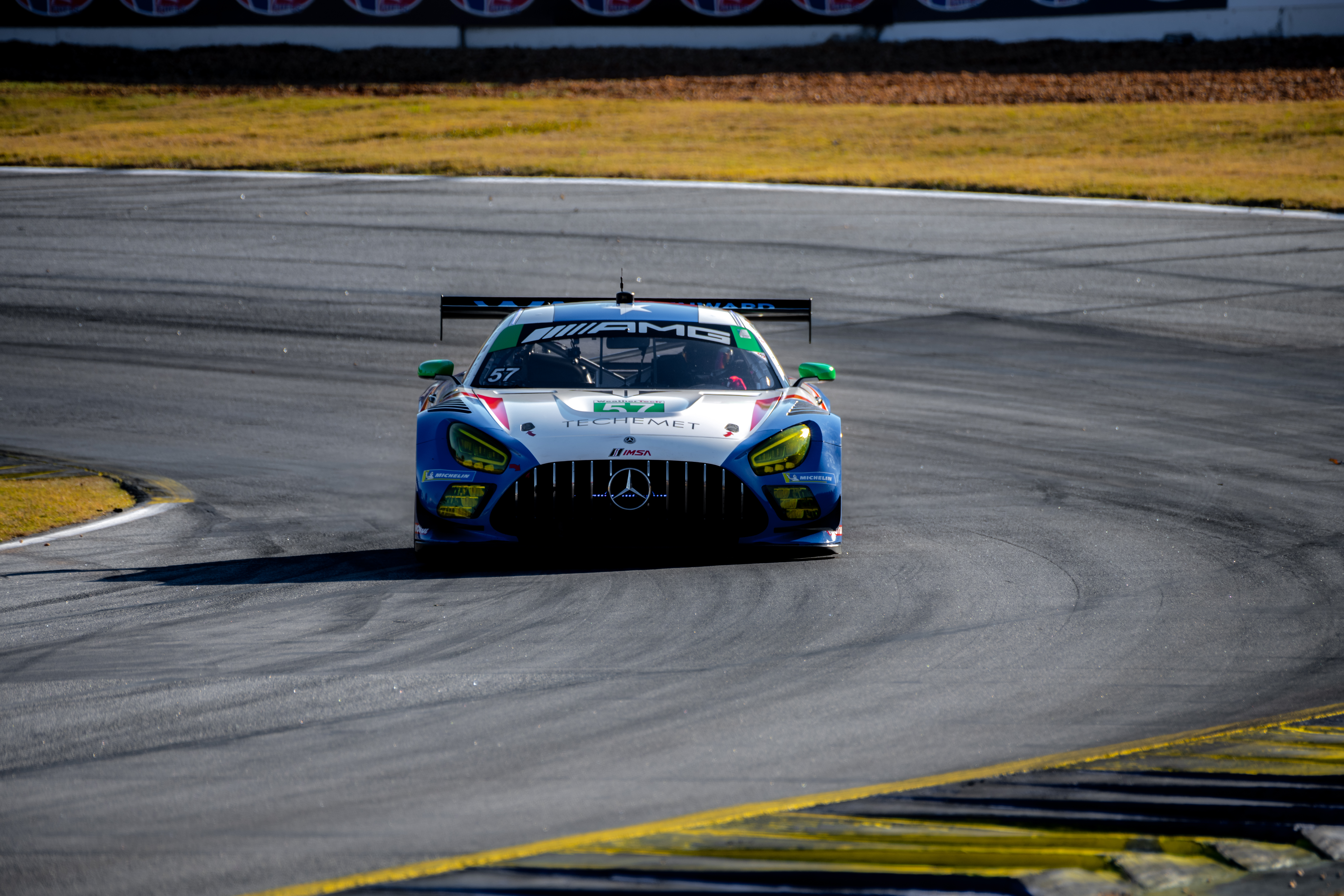
Winward Racing at the Road Atlanta in 2022.
