= Jeremy Clarke (racing driver) =

American racing driver (born 1986)

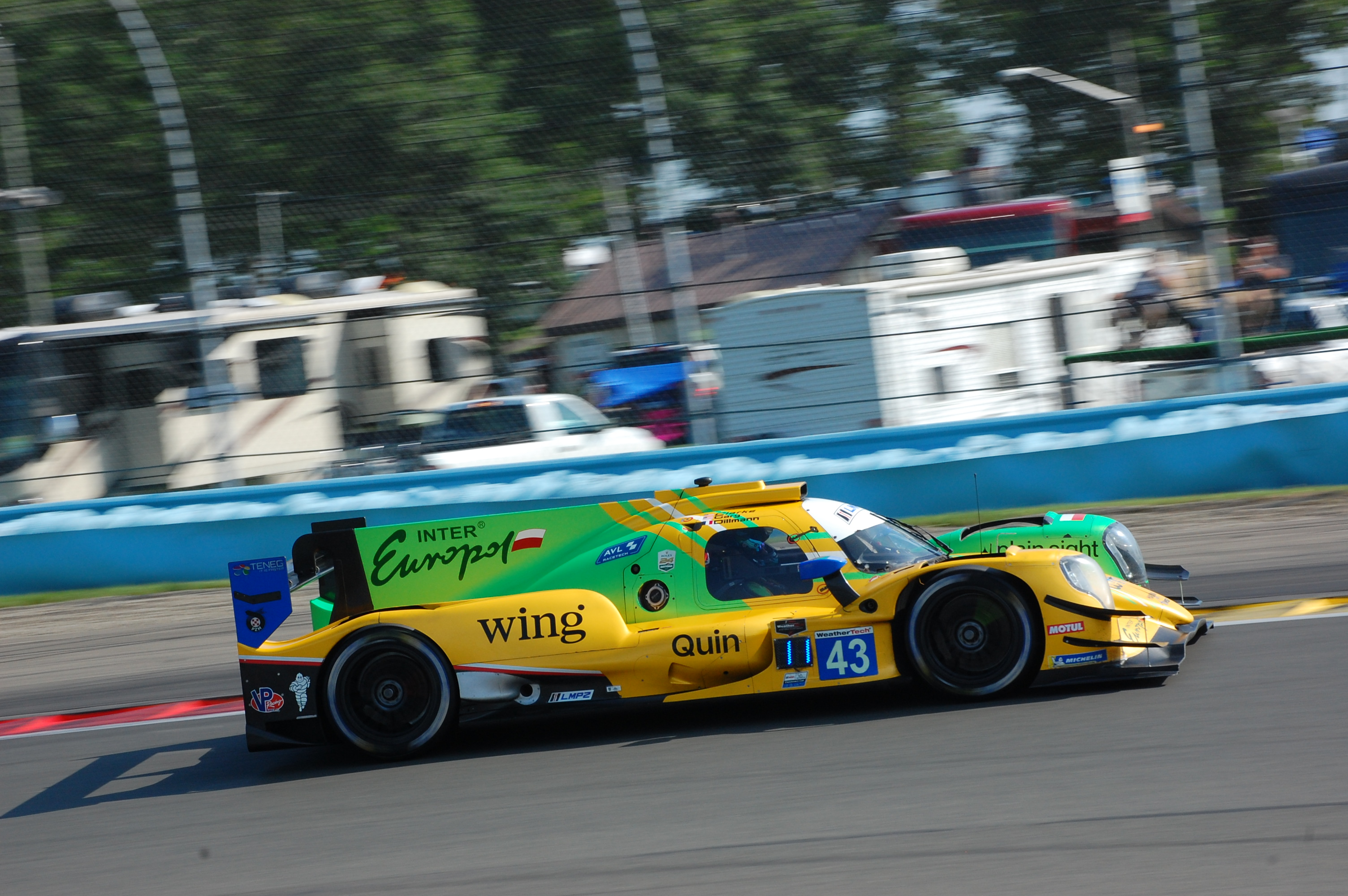
- Clarke in 2025
- Nationality: (United States) American
- Born: 30 June 1986 (age 40) South Bay, California, U.S.
- Categorisation: FIA Bronze

Championship titles
- 2022: Ferrari Challenge North America – Trofeo Pirelli

Jeremy J. Clarke (born June 30, 1986) is an American businessman and racing driver who competes in the LMP2 class of the IMSA SportsCar Championship for Inter Europol Competition.

== Business ventures ==
In 2011, Clarke founded WebMerge, a document automation and generation company, which he sold in 2019 to Formstack and was subsequently renamed to Formstack Documents. Following that, Clarke joined Plain Sight Ventures in 2022 as its CEO, before co-founding Quin, an AI assistant, two years later and working as the company's CEO as of May 2026.

== Racing career ==
Clarke began his racing career in 2021, competing in Ferrari Challenge North America for Ferrari of Beverly Hills in the Coppa Shell category. Competing on a part-time basis, Clarke took three class wins and finished fifth in the standings, before also finishing fifth in the World Finals at Mugello later that year. Remaining in the series for 2022, Clarke took wins at Daytona and Montreal, as well as five extra podiums to secure the Trofeo Pirelli title. During 2022, Clarke also made a one-off appearance in the Italian GT Sprint Championship for Pellin Racing at Imola in GT Cup Am, as well as finishing ninth in the Ferrari Challenge World Finals.

After select appearances in FCNA across the following two seasons, most notably winning race two at Laguna Seca in 2024, Clarke joined AF Corse at the end of the year to compete in the 2024–25 Asian Le Mans Series. Racing alongside Patrick Byrne and Olivier Pla in LMP2, Clarke was consistently the second-fastest bronze driver behind Giorgio Roda, but only managed a best result of sixth in race two at Dubai en route to ninth in points. Following that, Clarke joined Inter Europol Competition's LMP2 outfit for the 12 Hours of Sebring, which he won alongside Tom Dillmann and Bijoy Garg. Clarke subsequently saw out the IMSA SportsCar Championship season, finishing second at the final three races, grabbing pole at Petit Le Mans, and helping Inter Europol to third in the teams' standings.

Returning to Inter Europol for the 2026 season, Clarke began the year with pole and second place at the 24 Hours of Daytona alongside Dillmann, Garg and António Félix da Costa. Clarke followed that up with three more poles and two wins at Mosport and Road America to end the year runner-up in LMP2. At the end of the year, Clarke returned to AF Corse to compete in the LMP2 class of the 2026–27 Asian Le Mans Series.

In 2027, Clarke remained with Inter Europol for his third season in the IMSA SportsCar Championship.

== Racing record ==
=== Racing career summary ===
Season	Series	Team	Races	Wins	Poles	F/Laps	Podiums	Points	Position
2021	Ferrari Challenge North America – Coppa Shell	Ferrari of Beverly Hills	6	3	2	2	3	71	5th
2021	Ferrari Challenge World Finals – Coppa Shell	Ferrari of Beverly Hills	1	0	0	0	0	—N/a	5th
2022	Ferrari Challenge North America – Trofeo Pirelli	Ferrari of Beverly Hills	14	2	4	1	7	114	**1st**
2022	Ferrari Challenge World Finals – Trofeo Pirelli	Ferrari of Beverly Hills	1	0	0	0	0	—N/a	9th
2022	Italian GT Sprint Championship – GT Cup Am	Pellin Racing	2	0	0	0	2	27	NC
2023	Ferrari Challenge North America – Trofeo Pirelli	Ferrari of Beverly Hills	4	0	0	0	0	24	11th
2024	Ferrari Challenge North America – Trofeo 296 Pirelli	Ferrari of Beverly Hills	2	1	0	0	2	65	10th
2024–25	Asian Le Mans Series – LMP2	AF Corse	6	0	0	0	0	27	9th
2025	IMSA SportsCar Championship – LMP2	Inter Europol Competition	6	1	1	0	4	1908	5th
2026	IMSA SportsCar Championship – LMP2	Inter Europol Competition	7	2	4	0	4	2302	**2nd**
2026–27	Asian Le Mans Series – LMP2	AF Corse							
2027	IMSA SportsCar Championship – LMP2	Inter Europol Competition							

=== Complete Asian Le Mans Series results ===
(key) (Races in bold indicate pole position) (Races in italics indicate fastest lap)

Year	Team	Class	Car	Engine	1	2	3	4	5	6	Pos.	Points
2024–25	AF Corse	LMP2	Oreca 07	Gibson GK428 4.2 L V8	SEP; 1; 8	SEP; 2; 7	DUB; 1; 10	DUB; 2; 6	ABU; 1; 9	ABU; 2; 7	9th	27

=== Complete IMSA SportsCar Championship results ===
(key) (Races in bold indicate pole position; results in italics indicate fastest lap)

Year	Entrant	Class	Make	Engine	1	2	3	4	5	6	7	Rank	Points
2025	Inter Europol Competition	LMP2	Oreca 07	Gibson GK428 4.2 L V8	DAY	SEB; 1	WGL; 8	MOS; 10	ELK; 2	IMS; 2	**PET**; 2	5th	1908
2026	Inter Europol Competition	LMP2	Oreca 07	Gibson GK428 4.2 L V8	**DAY**; 2	SEB; 11	**WGL**; 4	**MOS**; 1	ELK; 1	**IMS**; 6	PET; 2	2nd	2302

^{*} Season still in progress.
