= 2026 IMSA Battle on the Bricks =

Tenth round of the 2026 IMSA SportsCar Championship season

The layout of Indianapolis Motor Speedway, where the race will be held.

The 2026 IMSA Battle on the Bricks (officially known as the 2026 Tirerack.com Battle on the Bricks) was a sports car race held at Indianapolis Motor Speedway in Speedway, Indiana, on September 20, 2026. It was the tenth round of the 2026 IMSA SportsCar Championship.

== Background ==
=== Preview ===
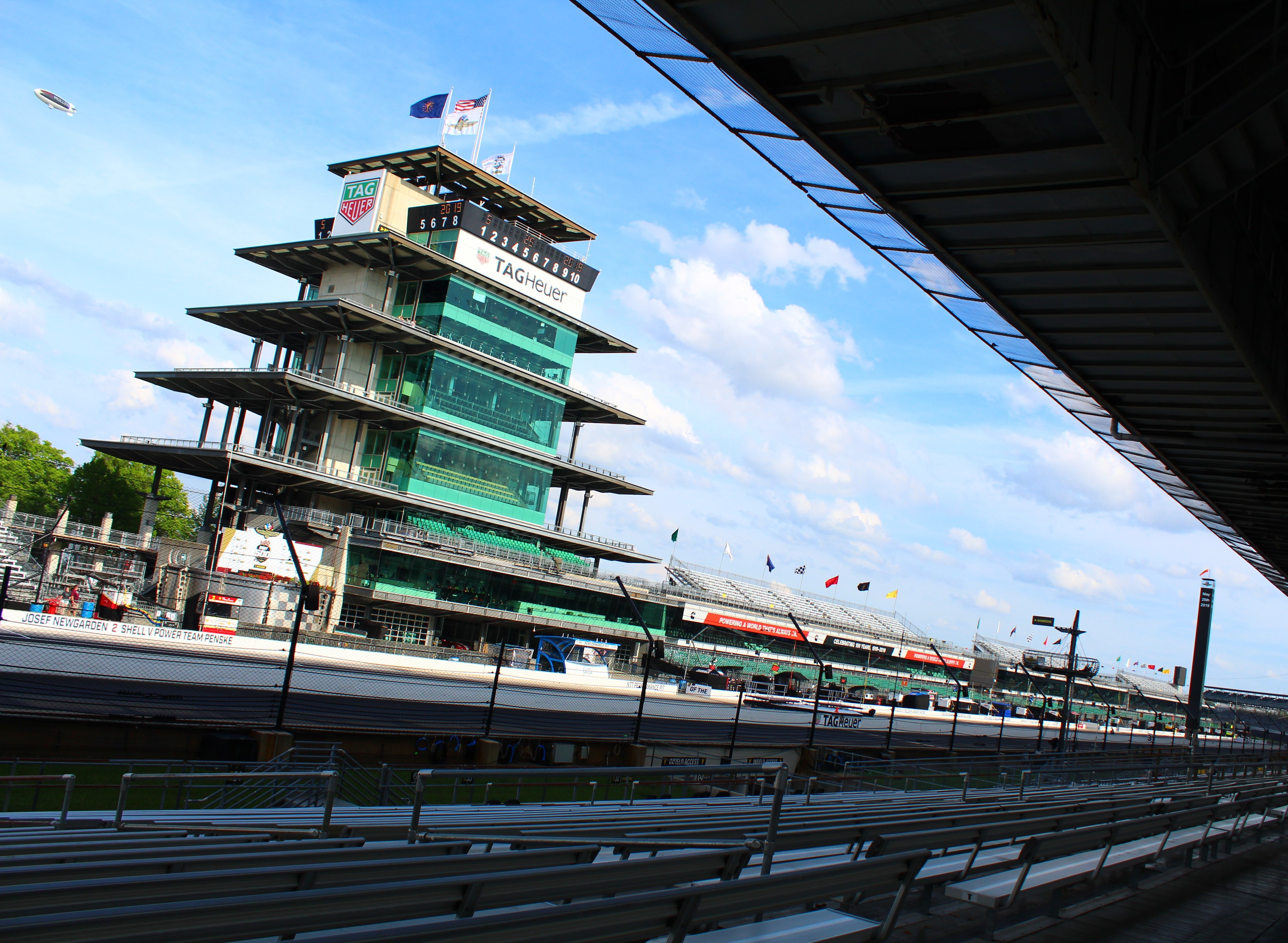
The Pagoda, the control tower, which houses officials, broadcasting, and hospitality suites, is an icon at the Indianapolis Motor Speedway.

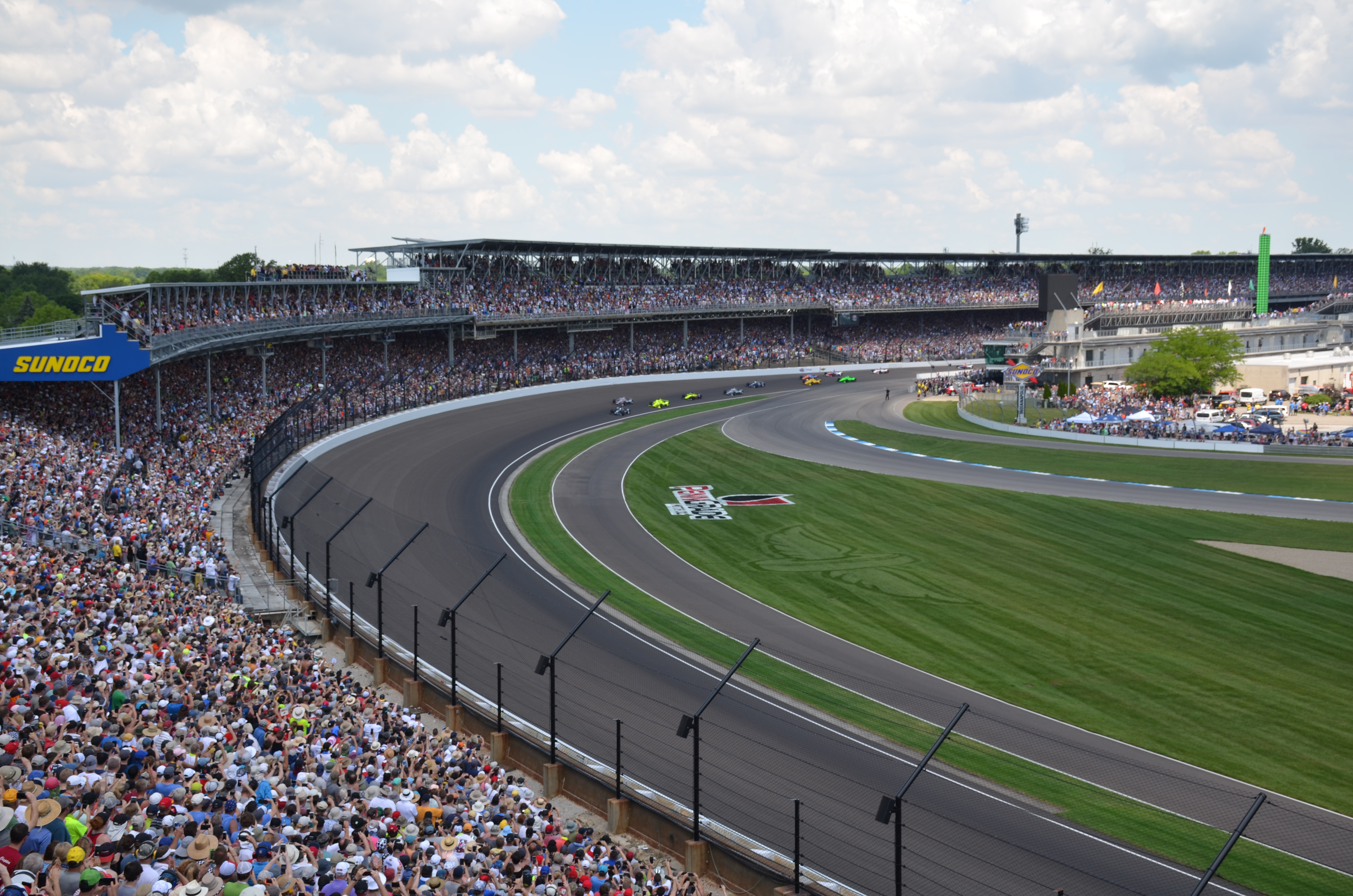
Turn one at the Indianapolis Motor Speedway.

International Motor Sports Association (IMSA) president John Doonan confirmed the race was part of the 2026 IMSA SportsCar Championship (IMSA SCC) in March 2025. It will be the fourth consecutive year the IMSA SCC hosted a race at Indianapolis Motor Speedway. The 2026 IMSA Battle on the Bricks was the tenth of eleven scheduled sports car races of 2026 by IMSA. The race will be held at the fourteen-turn 2.439 mi (3.925 km) Indianapolis Motor Speedway road course on September 20, 2026.

=== Standings before the race ===
Preceding the event, Jack Aitken led the GTP Drivers' Championship with 2400 points, 118 ahead of Laurin Heinrich. Nick Yelloly and Renger van der Zande sat in third, 185 points behind Aitken. The LMP2 Drivers' Championship was led by George Kurtz and Alex Quinn with 1701 points, 36 points ahead of second-placed Jeremy Clarke and Tom Dillmann. Dane Cameron and P. J. Hyett sat in third, a further 119 points behind. The GTD Pro Drivers' Championship saw Connor De Phillippi and Neil Verhagen leading with 2432 points, 23 points ahead of second-placed Nicky Catsburg and Tommy Milner. Andrea Caldarelli and Sandy Mitchell sat in third, 56 points behind De Phillippi and Verhagen. In GTD, Philip Ellis and Russell Ward led the Drivers' Championship with 2373 points, 36 points ahead of second-placed Robby Foley and Patrick Gallagher. Eduardo Barrichello sat in third place, 77 points behind. The Teams' Championships were led by Cadillac Whelen, CrowdStrike Racing by APR, Corvette Racing by Paul Miller Racing, and Winward Racing, respectively, whilst the Manufacturers' Championships were led by Cadillac in GTP, Chevrolet in GTD Pro, and Mercedes-AMG in GTD.

== Results ==
=== Post-race ===
Class winners are in bold and ‡.

Pos	Class	No	Team	Drivers	Chassis	Laps	Time/Retired
Pos	Class	No	Team	Drivers	Engine	Laps	Time/Retired
1	**GTP**	**24**	**(Belgium) BMW M Team WRT**	**(Belgium) Dries Vanthoor** **(South Africa) Sheldon van der Linde**	**BMW M Hybrid V8**	**112**	**2:41:13.430‡**
1	**GTP**	**24**	**(Belgium) BMW M Team WRT**	**(Belgium) Dries Vanthoor** **(South Africa) Sheldon van der Linde**	**BMW P66/3 4.0 L Turbo V8**	**112**	**2:41:13.430‡**
2	GTP	31	(United States) Cadillac Whelen	(United Kingdom) Jack Aitken (New Zealand) Earl Bamber	Cadillac V-Series.R	112	+2.926
2	GTP	31	(United States) Cadillac Whelen	(United Kingdom) Jack Aitken (New Zealand) Earl Bamber	Cadillac LMC55R 5.5 L V8	112	+2.926
3	GTP	6	(Germany) Porsche Penske Motorsport	(Germany) Laurin Heinrich (France) Kévin Estre	Porsche 963	112	+5.202
3	GTP	6	(Germany) Porsche Penske Motorsport	(Germany) Laurin Heinrich (France) Kévin Estre	Porsche 9RD 4.6 L Turbo V8	112	+5.202
4	GTP	40	(United States) Cadillac Wayne Taylor Racing	(United States) Jordan Taylor (Switzerland) Louis Delétraz	Cadillac V-Series.R	112	+25.396
4	GTP	40	(United States) Cadillac Wayne Taylor Racing	(United States) Jordan Taylor (Switzerland) Louis Delétraz	Cadillac LMC55R 5.5 L V8	112	+25.396
5	GTP	60	(United States) Acura Meyer Shank Racing with Curb-Agajanian	(United Kingdom) Tom Blomqvist (United States) Colin Braun	Acura ARX-06	112	+30.135
5	GTP	60	(United States) Acura Meyer Shank Racing with Curb-Agajanian	(United Kingdom) Tom Blomqvist (United States) Colin Braun	Acura AR24e 2.4 L Turbo V6	112	+30.135
6	GTP	10	(United States) Cadillac Wayne Taylor Racing	(United States) Ricky Taylor (Portugal) Filipe Albuquerque	Cadillac V-Series.R	112	+38.085
6	GTP	10	(United States) Cadillac Wayne Taylor Racing	(United States) Ricky Taylor (Portugal) Filipe Albuquerque	Cadillac LMC55R 5.5 L V8	112	+38.085
7	GTP	93	(United States) Acura Meyer Shank Racing with Curb-Agajanian	(Netherlands) Renger van der Zande (United Kingdom) Nick Yelloly	Acura ARX-06	112	+39.043
7	GTP	93	(United States) Acura Meyer Shank Racing with Curb-Agajanian	(Netherlands) Renger van der Zande (United Kingdom) Nick Yelloly	Acura AR24e 2.4 L Turbo V6	112	+39.043
8	GTP	23	(United States) Aston Martin THOR Team	(Canada) Roman De Angelis (United Kingdom) Ross Gunn	Aston Martin Valkyrie	112	+44.135
8	GTP	23	(United States) Aston Martin THOR Team	(Canada) Roman De Angelis (United Kingdom) Ross Gunn	Aston Martin RA 6.5 L V12	112	+44.135
9	GTP	5	(United States) JDC-Miller MotorSports	(Netherlands) Tijmen van der Helm (Switzerland) Nico Müller	Porsche 963	112	+48.243
9	GTP	5	(United States) JDC-Miller MotorSports	(Netherlands) Tijmen van der Helm (Switzerland) Nico Müller	Porsche 9RD 4.6 L Turbo V8	112	+48.243
10	GTP	25	(Belgium) BMW M Team WRT	(Austria) Philipp Eng (Germany) Marco Wittmann	BMW M Hybrid V8	111	+1 Lap
10	GTP	25	(Belgium) BMW M Team WRT	(Austria) Philipp Eng (Germany) Marco Wittmann	BMW P66/3 4.0 L Turbo V8	111	+1 Lap
11	**LMP2**	**18**	**(United States) Era Motorsport**	**(United States) Nick Boulle** **(Denmark) Christian Rasmussen**	**Oreca 07**	**109**	**+3 Laps‡**
11	**LMP2**	**18**	**(United States) Era Motorsport**	**(United States) Nick Boulle** **(Denmark) Christian Rasmussen**	**Gibson GK428 4.2 L V8**	**109**	**+3 Laps‡**
12	LMP2	52	(United States) Bryan Herta Autosport with PR1/Mathiasen	(Canada) Misha Goikhberg (United Kingdom) Harry Tincknell	Oreca 07	109	+3 Laps
12	LMP2	52	(United States) Bryan Herta Autosport with PR1/Mathiasen	(Canada) Misha Goikhberg (United Kingdom) Harry Tincknell	Gibson GK428 4.2 L V8	109	+3 Laps
13	LMP2	22	(United States) United Autosports USA	(United States) Dan Goldburg (United Kingdom) Paul di Resta	Oreca 07	109	+3 Laps
13	LMP2	22	(United States) United Autosports USA	(United States) Dan Goldburg (United Kingdom) Paul di Resta	Gibson GK428 4.2 L V8	109	+3 Laps
14	LMP2	8	(Canada) Tower Motorsports	(France) Tristan Vautier (Canada) John Farano	Oreca 07	109	+3 Laps
14	LMP2	8	(Canada) Tower Motorsports	(France) Tristan Vautier (Canada) John Farano	Gibson GK428 4.2 L V8	109	+3 Laps
15	LMP2	73	(United States) Pratt Miller Motorsports	(Canada) Chris Cumming (Brazil) Pietro Fittipaldi	Oreca 07	108	+4 Laps
15	LMP2	73	(United States) Pratt Miller Motorsports	(Canada) Chris Cumming (Brazil) Pietro Fittipaldi	Gibson GK428 4.2 L V8	108	+4 Laps
16	LMP2	43	(Poland) Inter Europol Competition	(United States) Jeremy Clarke (France) Tom Dillmann	Oreca 07	108	+4 Laps
16	LMP2	43	(Poland) Inter Europol Competition	(United States) Jeremy Clarke (France) Tom Dillmann	Gibson GK428 4.2 L V8	108	+4 Laps
17	LMP2	11	(France) TDS Racing	(Switzerland) Mathias Beche (Canada) Tobias Lütke	Oreca 07	108	+4 Laps
17	LMP2	11	(France) TDS Racing	(Switzerland) Mathias Beche (Canada) Tobias Lütke	Gibson GK428 4.2 L V8	108	+4 Laps
18	**GTD Pro**	**64**	**(United States) Ford Racing**	**(United Kingdom) Ben Barker** **(Norway) Dennis Olsen**	**Ford Mustang GT3 Evo**	**105**	**+7 Laps‡**
18	**GTD Pro**	**64**	**(United States) Ford Racing**	**(United Kingdom) Ben Barker** **(Norway) Dennis Olsen**	**Ford Coyote 5.4 L V8**	**105**	**+7 Laps‡**
19	GTD Pro	4	(United States) Corvette Racing by Pratt Miller Motorsports	(Netherlands) Nicky Catsburg (United States) Tommy Milner	Chevrolet Corvette Z06 GT3.R	105	+7 Laps
19	GTD Pro	4	(United States) Corvette Racing by Pratt Miller Motorsports	(Netherlands) Nicky Catsburg (United States) Tommy Milner	Chevrolet LT6.R 5.5 L V8	105	+7 Laps
20	GTD Pro	9	(Canada) Pfaff Motorsports	(Italy) Andrea Caldarelli (United Kingdom) Sandy Mitchell	Lamborghini Temerario GT3	105	+7 Laps
20	GTD Pro	9	(Canada) Pfaff Motorsports	(Italy) Andrea Caldarelli (United Kingdom) Sandy Mitchell	Lamborghini L411 4.0 L Turbo V8	105	+7 Laps
21	GTD Pro	3	(United States) Corvette Racing by Pratt Miller Motorsports	(Spain) Antonio García (United Kingdom) Alexander Sims	Chevrolet Corvette Z06 GT3.R	105	+7 Laps
21	GTD Pro	3	(United States) Corvette Racing by Pratt Miller Motorsports	(Spain) Antonio García (United Kingdom) Alexander Sims	Chevrolet LT6.R 5.5 L V8	105	+7 Laps
22	GTD Pro	14	(United States) Vasser Sullivan Racing	(United Kingdom) Ben Barnicoat (United Kingdom) Jack Hawksworth	Lexus RC F GT3	105	+7 Laps
22	GTD Pro	14	(United States) Vasser Sullivan Racing	(United Kingdom) Ben Barnicoat (United Kingdom) Jack Hawksworth	Toyota 2UR-GSE 5.4 L V8	105	+7 Laps
23	GTD Pro	1	(United States) Paul Miller Racing	(United States) Connor De Phillippi (United States) Neil Verhagen	BMW M4 GT3 Evo	105	+7 Laps
23	GTD Pro	1	(United States) Paul Miller Racing	(United States) Connor De Phillippi (United States) Neil Verhagen	BMW P58 3.0 L Turbo I6	105	+7 Laps
24	GTD Pro	65	(United States) Ford Racing	(Germany) Christopher Mies (Belgium) Frédéric Vervisch	Ford Mustang GT3 Evo	105	+7 Laps
24	GTD Pro	65	(United States) Ford Racing	(Germany) Christopher Mies (Belgium) Frédéric Vervisch	Ford Coyote 5.4 L V8	105	+7 Laps
25	GTD Pro	59	(United States) RLL Team McLaren	(United States) Max Esterson (United States) Nikita Johnson	McLaren 720S GT3 Evo	104	+8 Laps
25	GTD Pro	59	(United States) RLL Team McLaren	(United States) Max Esterson (United States) Nikita Johnson	McLaren M840T 4.0 L Turbo V8	104	+8 Laps
26	**GTD**	**96**	**(United States) Turner Motorsport**	**(United States) Robby Foley** **(United States) Patrick Gallagher**	**BMW M4 GT3 Evo**	**104**	**+8 Laps‡**
26	**GTD**	**96**	**(United States) Turner Motorsport**	**(United States) Robby Foley** **(United States) Patrick Gallagher**	**BMW P58 3.0 L Turbo I6**	**104**	**+8 Laps‡**
27	GTD	57	(United States) Winward Racing	(Switzerland) Philip Ellis (United States) Russell Ward	Mercedes-AMG GT3 Evo	104	+8 Laps
27	GTD	57	(United States) Winward Racing	(Switzerland) Philip Ellis (United States) Russell Ward	Mercedes-AMG M159 6.2 L V8	104	+8 Laps
28	GTD Pro	68	(United States) Car Blanche	(Denmark) Marco Sørensen (France) Valentin Hasse-Clot	Aston Martin Vantage AMR GT3 Evo	104	+8 Laps
28	GTD Pro	68	(United States) Car Blanche	(Denmark) Marco Sørensen (France) Valentin Hasse-Clot	Aston Martin AMR16A 4.0 L Turbo V8	104	+8 Laps
29	GTD	13	(Canada) 13 Autosport	(United Kingdom) Matt Bell (Canada) Orey Fidani	Chevrolet Corvette Z06 GT3.R	104	+8 Laps
29	GTD	13	(Canada) 13 Autosport	(United Kingdom) Matt Bell (Canada) Orey Fidani	Chevrolet LT6.R 5.5 L V8	104	+8 Laps
30	GTD	81	(United States) DragonSpeed	(Italy) Giacomo Altoè (United Kingdom) Casper Stevenson	Chevrolet Corvette Z06 GT3.R	104	+8 Laps
30	GTD	81	(United States) DragonSpeed	(Italy) Giacomo Altoè (United Kingdom) Casper Stevenson	Chevrolet LT6.R 5.5 L V8	104	+8 Laps
31	GTD	27	(United States) Heart of Racing Team	(Brazil) Eduardo Barrichello (United Kingdom) Tom Gamble	Aston Martin Vantage AMR GT3 Evo	104	+8 Laps
31	GTD	27	(United States) Heart of Racing Team	(Brazil) Eduardo Barrichello (United Kingdom) Tom Gamble	Aston Martin AMR16A 4.0 L Turbo V8	104	+8 Laps
32	GTD	120	(United States) Wright Motorsports	(United States) Adam Adelson (United Kingdom) Callum Ilott	Porsche 911 GT3 R (992.2)	104	+8 Laps
32	GTD	120	(United States) Wright Motorsports	(United States) Adam Adelson (United Kingdom) Callum Ilott	Porsche M97/80 4.2 L Flat-6	104	+8 Laps
33	GTD	66	(United States) Gradient Racing	(United States) Corey Lewis (United States) Jake Walker	Ford Mustang GT3 Evo	104	+8 Laps
33	GTD	66	(United States) Gradient Racing	(United States) Corey Lewis (United States) Jake Walker	Ford Coyote 5.4 L V8	104	+8 Laps
34	GTD	12	(United States) Vasser Sullivan Racing	(Denmark) Benjamin Pedersen (United States) Aaron Telitz	Lexus RC F GT3	104	+8 Laps
34	GTD	12	(United States) Vasser Sullivan Racing	(Denmark) Benjamin Pedersen (United States) Aaron Telitz	Toyota 2UR-GSE 5.4 L V8	104	+8 Laps
35	GTD Pro	77	(United States) AO Racing	(United Kingdom) Harry King (United Kingdom) Nick Tandy	Porsche 911 GT3 R (992.2)	103	+9 Laps
35	GTD Pro	77	(United States) AO Racing	(United Kingdom) Harry King (United Kingdom) Nick Tandy	Porsche M97/80 4.2 L Flat-6	103	+9 Laps
36	GTD	16	(United States) Myers Riley Motorsports	(Brazil) Felipe Fraga (United States) Sheena Monk	Ford Mustang GT3 Evo	103	+9 Laps
36	GTD	16	(United States) Myers Riley Motorsports	(Brazil) Felipe Fraga (United States) Sheena Monk	Ford Coyote 5.4 L V8	103	+9 Laps
37	GTD	70	(United Kingdom) Inception Racing	(United States) Brendan Iribe (Denmark) Frederik Schandorff	Ferrari 296 GT3 Evo	103	+9 Laps
37	GTD	70	(United Kingdom) Inception Racing	(United States) Brendan Iribe (Denmark) Frederik Schandorff	Ferrari F163CE 3.0 L Turbo V6	103	+9 Laps
38	GTD	34	(United States) Conquest Racing	(Spain) Albert Costa (Italy) Lorenzo Patrese	Ferrari 296 GT3 Evo	103	+9 Laps
38	GTD	34	(United States) Conquest Racing	(Spain) Albert Costa (Italy) Lorenzo Patrese	Ferrari F163CE 3.0 L Turbo V6	103	+9 Laps
39	GTD	36	(United States) DXDT Racing	(United States) Mason Filippi (Canada) Robert Wickens	Chevrolet Corvette Z06 GT3.R	100	+12 Laps
39	GTD	36	(United States) DXDT Racing	(United States) Mason Filippi (Canada) Robert Wickens	Chevrolet LT6.R 5.5 L V8	100	+12 Laps
40	LMP2	99	(United States) AO Racing	(United States) Dane Cameron (United States) P. J. Hyett	Oreca 07	94	+18 Laps
40	LMP2	99	(United States) AO Racing	(United States) Dane Cameron (United States) P. J. Hyett	Gibson GK428 4.2 L V8	94	+18 Laps
41	GTP	7	(Germany) Porsche Penske Motorsport	(Brazil) Felipe Nasr (France) Julien Andlauer	Porsche 963	90	+22 Laps
41	GTP	7	(Germany) Porsche Penske Motorsport	(Brazil) Felipe Nasr (France) Julien Andlauer	Porsche 9RD 4.6 L Turbo V8	90	+22 Laps
42	LMP2	04	(United States) CrowdStrike Racing by APR	(United States) George Kurtz (United Kingdom) Alex Quinn	Oreca 07	67	+45 Laps
42	LMP2	04	(United States) CrowdStrike Racing by APR	(United States) George Kurtz (United Kingdom) Alex Quinn	Gibson GK428 4.2 L V8	67	+45 Laps
43 DNF	GTD	45	(United States) Wayne Taylor Racing	(Costa Rica) Danny Formal (United States) Trent Hindman	Lamborghini Huracán GT3 Evo 2	66	Fueling
43 DNF	GTD	45	(United States) Wayne Taylor Racing	(Costa Rica) Danny Formal (United States) Trent Hindman	Lamborghini DGF 5.2 L V10	66	Fueling
44 DNF	LMP2	2	(United States) United Autosports USA	(Canada) Phil Fayer (Denmark) Mikkel Jensen	Oreca 07	0	Collision
44 DNF	LMP2	2	(United States) United Autosports USA	(Canada) Phil Fayer (Denmark) Mikkel Jensen	Gibson GK428 4.2 L V8	0	Collision

IMSA SportsCar Championship
Previous race: Michelin GT Challenge at VIR	2026 season	Next race: Petit Le Mans
