= 2026 SportsCar Grand Prix =

Eighth round of the 2026 IMSA SportsCar Championship season

The layout of Road America, where the race will be held

The 2026 Endurance SportsCar Grand Prix (formally known as the 2026 Motul SportsCar Endurance Grand Prix) is a sports car race, it was held at Road America near Elkhart Lake, Wisconsin, on August 2, 2026. It was the eighth round of the 2026 IMSA SportsCar Championship.

== Background ==
=== Preview ===
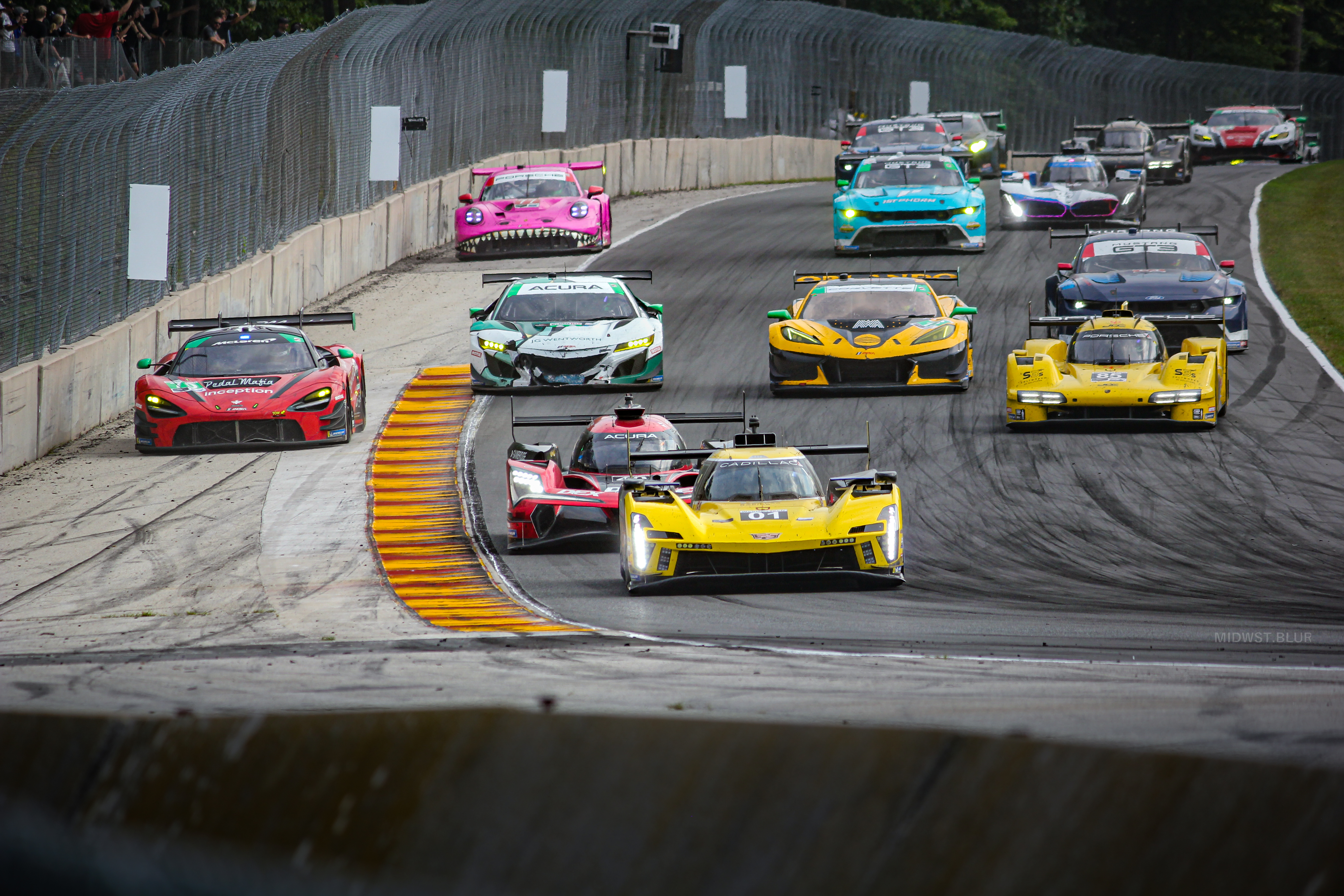
Road America, where the race will be held

International Motor Sports Association (IMSA) president John Doonan confirmed the race was part of the schedule of the 2026 IMSA SportsCar Championship (IMSA SCC) in March 2025. It will be the thirteenth consecutive time the IMSA SCC hosts a race at Road America. The 2026 Motul Endurance SportsCar Grand Prix will be the eighth of eleven scheduled sports car races of 2026 by IMSA. The race will be held at the fourteen-turn 4.048 mi (6.515 km) Road America on August 2, 2026.

=== Standings before the race ===
The GTP Drivers' Championship is currently being led by Jack Aitken with 2145 points, 203 ahead of second-placed Laurin Heinrich. Nick Yelloly and Renger van der Zande sit 245 points behind Aitken in third place. George Kurtz and Alex Quinn are leading the LMP2 Drivers' Championship with 1355 points, 70 points ahead of Jeremy Clarke, and Tom Dillmann in second. Connor De Phillippi and Neil Verhagen are currently on top in the GTD Pro Drivers' Championship with 1910 points, 108 ahead of Nicky Catsburg and Tommy Milner in second. Harry King and Nick Tandy sits a further 144 points behind in third place. The GTD Drivers' Championship is topped by Eduardo Barrichello with 1825 points, 82 ahead of second-placed Benjamin Pedersen and Aaron Telitz. Cadillac is leading the GTP Manufacturers' Championships. Chevrolet is leading the GTP Pro Manufacturers' Championship and Aston Martin is leading the GTD Manufacturers' Championship. Cadillac Whelen, CrowdStrike Racing by APR, Paul Miller Racing, and Heart of Racing Team are leading their Teams' Championships.

== Results ==
=== Post-race ===
Class winners are in bold and ‡.

Pos	Class	No	Team	Drivers	Chassis	Laps	Time/Retired
Pos	Class	No	Team	Drivers	Engine	Laps	Time/Retired
1	**GTP**	**10**	**(United States) Cadillac Wayne Taylor Racing**	**(Portugal) Filipe Albuquerque** **(United States) Ricky Taylor**	**Cadillac V-Series.R**	**151**	**6:00:45.052‡**
1	**GTP**	**10**	**(United States) Cadillac Wayne Taylor Racing**	**(Portugal) Filipe Albuquerque** **(United States) Ricky Taylor**	**Cadillac LMC55R 5.5 L V8**	**151**	**6:00:45.052‡**
2	GTP	5	(United States) JDC-Miller MotorSports	(Netherlands) Tijmen van der Helm (Germany) Laurin Heinrich (United States) Kaylen Frederick	Porsche 963	151	+1.960
2	GTP	5	(United States) JDC-Miller MotorSports	(Netherlands) Tijmen van der Helm (Germany) Laurin Heinrich (United States) Kaylen Frederick	Porsche 9RD 4.6 L Turbo V8	151	+1.960
3	GTP	40	(United States) Cadillac Wayne Taylor Racing	(Switzerland) Louis Delétraz (United States) Jordan Taylor	Cadillac V-Series.R	151	+2.841
3	GTP	40	(United States) Cadillac Wayne Taylor Racing	(Switzerland) Louis Delétraz (United States) Jordan Taylor	Cadillac LMC55R 5.5 L V8	151	+2.841
4	GTP	93	(United States) Acura Meyer Shank Racing with Curb-Agajanian	(United Kingdom) Nick Yelloly (Netherlands) Renger van der Zande	Acura ARX-06	151	+3.194
4	GTP	93	(United States) Acura Meyer Shank Racing with Curb-Agajanian	(United Kingdom) Nick Yelloly (Netherlands) Renger van der Zande	Acura AR24e 2.4 L Turbo V6	151	+3.194
5	GTP	23	(United States) Aston Martin THOR Team	(Canada) Roman De Angelis (United Kingdom) Ross Gunn	Aston Martin Valkyrie	151	+45.537
5	GTP	23	(United States) Aston Martin THOR Team	(Canada) Roman De Angelis (United Kingdom) Ross Gunn	Aston Martin RA 6.5 L V12	151	+45.537
6	GTP	7	(Germany) Porsche Penske Motorsport	(France) Julien Andlauer (Brazil) Felipe Nasr	Porsche 963	149	+2 Laps
6	GTP	7	(Germany) Porsche Penske Motorsport	(France) Julien Andlauer (Brazil) Felipe Nasr	Porsche 9RD 4.6 L Turbo V8	149	+2 Laps
7	GTP	25	(Belgium) BMW M Team WRT	(Austria) Philipp Eng (Germany) Marco Wittmann	BMW M Hybrid V8	149	+2 Laps
7	GTP	25	(Belgium) BMW M Team WRT	(Austria) Philipp Eng (Germany) Marco Wittmann	BMW P66/3 4.0 L Turbo V8	149	+2 Laps
8	**LMP2**	**43**	**(Poland) Inter Europol Competition**	**(United States) Jeremy Clarke** **(France) Tom Dillmann** **(United States) Bijoy Garg**	**Oreca 07**	**149**	**+2 Laps‡**
8	**LMP2**	**43**	**(Poland) Inter Europol Competition**	**(United States) Jeremy Clarke** **(France) Tom Dillmann** **(United States) Bijoy Garg**	**Gibson GK428 4.2 L V8**	**149**	**+2 Laps‡**
9	LMP2	04	(United States) CrowdStrike Racing by APR	(United States) George Kurtz (United Kingdom) Alex Quinn (United Kingdom) Toby Sowery	Oreca 07	149	+2 Laps
9	LMP2	04	(United States) CrowdStrike Racing by APR	(United States) George Kurtz (United Kingdom) Alex Quinn (United Kingdom) Toby Sowery	Gibson GK428 4.2 L V8	149	+2 Laps
10	LMP2	11	(France) TDS Racing	(Canada) Tobias Lütke (Denmark) David Heinemeier Hansson (Switzerland) Mathias Beche	Oreca 07	149	+2 Laps
10	LMP2	11	(France) TDS Racing	(Canada) Tobias Lütke (Denmark) David Heinemeier Hansson (Switzerland) Mathias Beche	Gibson GK428 4.2 L V8	149	+2 Laps
11	LMP2	99	(United States) AO Racing	(United States) Dane Cameron (United States) P.J. Hyett (United Kingdom) Jonny Edgar	Oreca 07	149	+2 Laps
11	LMP2	99	(United States) AO Racing	(United States) Dane Cameron (United States) P.J. Hyett (United Kingdom) Jonny Edgar	Gibson GK428 4.2 L V8	149	+2 Laps
12	LMP2	8	(Canada) Tower Motorsports	(Mexico) Sebastián Álvarez (Canada) John Farano (France) Tristan Vautier	Oreca 07	149	+2 Laps
12	LMP2	8	(Canada) Tower Motorsports	(Mexico) Sebastián Álvarez (Canada) John Farano (France) Tristan Vautier	Gibson GK428 4.2 L V8	149	+2 Laps
13	LMP2	52	(United States) Bryan Herta Autosport with PR1/Mathiasen Motorsports	(Canada) Misha Goikhberg (Canada) Parker Thompson (United Kingdom) Harry Tincknell	Oreca 07	149	+2 Laps
13	LMP2	52	(United States) Bryan Herta Autosport with PR1/Mathiasen Motorsports	(Canada) Misha Goikhberg (Canada) Parker Thompson (United Kingdom) Harry Tincknell	Gibson GK428 4.2 L V8	149	+2 Laps
14	LMP2	22	(United States) United Autosports USA	(United States) Dan Goldburg (United Kingdom) Paul di Resta (Sweden) Rasmus Lindh	Oreca 07	149	+2 Laps
14	LMP2	22	(United States) United Autosports USA	(United States) Dan Goldburg (United Kingdom) Paul di Resta (Sweden) Rasmus Lindh	Gibson GK428 4.2 L V8	149	+2 Laps
15	LMP2	79	(United States) JDC-Miller MotorSports	(Australia) Josh Burdon (United Kingdom) Sennan Fielding (United States) Gerry Kraut	Oreca 07	149	+2 Laps
15	LMP2	79	(United States) JDC-Miller MotorSports	(Australia) Josh Burdon (United Kingdom) Sennan Fielding (United States) Gerry Kraut	Gibson GK428 4.2 L V8	149	+2 Laps
16	LMP2	2	(United States) United Autosports USA	(Canada) Phil Fayer (Denmark) Mikkel Jensen (New Zealand) Hunter McElrea	Oreca 07	149	+2 Laps
16	LMP2	2	(United States) United Autosports USA	(Canada) Phil Fayer (Denmark) Mikkel Jensen (New Zealand) Hunter McElrea	Gibson GK428 4.2 L V8	149	+2 Laps
17 DNF	GTP	6	(Germany) Porsche Penske Motorsport	(France) Kévin Estre (Belgium) Laurens Vanthoor	Porsche 963	148	Incident
17 DNF	GTP	6	(Germany) Porsche Penske Motorsport	(France) Kévin Estre (Belgium) Laurens Vanthoor	Porsche 9RD 4.6 L Turbo V8	148	Incident
18 DNF	GTP	31	(United States) Cadillac Whelen	(United Kingdom) Jack Aitken (New Zealand) Earl Bamber (Denmark) Frederik Vesti	Cadillac V-Series.R	148	Incident
18 DNF	GTP	31	(United States) Cadillac Whelen	(United Kingdom) Jack Aitken (New Zealand) Earl Bamber (Denmark) Frederik Vesti	Cadillac LMC55R 5.5 L V8	148	Incident
19	LMP2	18	(United States) Era Motorsport	(United States) Jacob Abel (Austria) Ferdinand Habsburg (United States) Naveen Rao	Oreca 07	148	+3 Laps
19	LMP2	18	(United States) Era Motorsport	(United States) Jacob Abel (Austria) Ferdinand Habsburg (United States) Naveen Rao	Gibson GK428 4.2 L V8	148	+3 Laps
20 DNF	GTP	60	(United States) Acura Meyer Shank Racing with Curb-Agajanian	(United Kingdom) Tom Blomqvist (United States) Colin Braun	Acura ARX-06	145	Crash
20 DNF	GTP	60	(United States) Acura Meyer Shank Racing with Curb-Agajanian	(United Kingdom) Tom Blomqvist (United States) Colin Braun	Acura AR24e 2.4 L Turbo V6	145	Crash
21	**GTD Pro**	**9**	**(Canada) Pfaff Motorsports**	**(Italy) Andrea Caldarelli** **(United Kingdom) Sandy Mitchell**	**Lamborghini Temerario GT3**	**142**	**+9 Laps‡**
21	**GTD Pro**	**9**	**(Canada) Pfaff Motorsports**	**(Italy) Andrea Caldarelli** **(United Kingdom) Sandy Mitchell**	**Lamborghini L411 4.0 L Turbo V8**	**142**	**+9 Laps‡**
22	GTD Pro	77	(United States) AO Racing	(United Kingdom) Harry King (United Kingdom) Nick Tandy	Porsche 911 GT3 R (992.2)	142	+9 Laps
22	GTD Pro	77	(United States) AO Racing	(United Kingdom) Harry King (United Kingdom) Nick Tandy	Porsche M97/80 4.2 L Flat-6	142	+9 Laps
23	GTD Pro	4	(United States) Corvette Racing by Pratt Miller Motorsports	(Netherlands) Nicky Catsburg (United States) Tommy Milner	Chevrolet Corvette Z06 GT3.R	142	+9 Laps
23	GTD Pro	4	(United States) Corvette Racing by Pratt Miller Motorsports	(Netherlands) Nicky Catsburg (United States) Tommy Milner	Chevrolet LT6.R 5.5 L V8	142	+9 Laps
24	GTD Pro	65	(United States) Ford Racing	(Germany) Christopher Mies (Belgium) Frédéric Vervisch	Ford Mustang GT3 Evo	142	+9 Laps
24	GTD Pro	65	(United States) Ford Racing	(Germany) Christopher Mies (Belgium) Frédéric Vervisch	Ford Coyote 5.4 L V8	142	+9 Laps
25	GTD Pro	64	(United States) Ford Racing	(United Kingdom) Ben Barker (Norway) Dennis Olsen	Ford Mustang GT3 Evo	142	+9 Laps
25	GTD Pro	64	(United States) Ford Racing	(United Kingdom) Ben Barker (Norway) Dennis Olsen	Ford Coyote 5.4 L V8	142	+9 Laps
26	GTD Pro	14	(United States) Vasser Sullivan Racing	(United Kingdom) Ben Barnicoat (United Kingdom) Jack Hawksworth	Lexus RC F GT3	142	+9 Laps
26	GTD Pro	14	(United States) Vasser Sullivan Racing	(United Kingdom) Ben Barnicoat (United Kingdom) Jack Hawksworth	Toyota 2UR-GSE 5.4 L V8	142	+9 Laps
27	GTD Pro	033	(United States) Triarsi Competizione	(Italy) Riccardo Agostini (United Kingdom) James Calado	Ferrari 296 GT3 Evo	142	+9 Laps
27	GTD Pro	033	(United States) Triarsi Competizione	(Italy) Riccardo Agostini (United Kingdom) James Calado	Ferrari F163CE 3.0 L Turbo V6	142	+9 Laps
28	GTD Pro	62	(United States) Risi Competizione	(Italy) Davide Rigon (Brazil) Daniel Serra	Ferrari 296 GT3 Evo	142	+9 Laps
28	GTD Pro	62	(United States) Risi Competizione	(Italy) Davide Rigon (Brazil) Daniel Serra	Ferrari F163CE 3.0 L Turbo V6	142	+9 Laps
29	**GTD**	**57**	**(United States) Winward Racing**	**(Switzerland) Philip Ellis** **(United States) Russell Ward** **(Netherlands) Indy Dontje**	**Mercedes-AMG GT3 Evo**	**142**	**+9 Laps‡**
29	**GTD**	**57**	**(United States) Winward Racing**	**(Switzerland) Philip Ellis** **(United States) Russell Ward** **(Netherlands) Indy Dontje**	**Mercedes-AMG M159 6.2 L V8**	**142**	**+9 Laps‡**
30	GTD	023	(United States) Triarsi Competizione	(Germany) Kenton Koch (United States) Robert Megennis (United States) Onofrio Triarsi	Ferrari 296 GT3 Evo	142	+9 Laps
30	GTD	023	(United States) Triarsi Competizione	(Germany) Kenton Koch (United States) Robert Megennis (United States) Onofrio Triarsi	Ferrari F163CE 3.0 Turbo V6	142	+9 Laps
31	GTD	81	(United States) DragonSpeed	(Italy) Giacomo Altoè (United Kingdom) Casper Stevenson	Chevrolet Corvette Z06 GT3.R	142	+9 Laps
31	GTD	81	(United States) DragonSpeed	(Italy) Giacomo Altoè (United Kingdom) Casper Stevenson	Chevrolet LT6.R 5.5 L V8	142	+9 Laps
32	GTD	068	(United States) Car Blanche	(United States) Trenton Estep (France) Marius Fossard (France) Valentin Hasse-Clot	Aston Martin Vantage AMR GT3 Evo	142	+9 Laps
32	GTD	068	(United States) Car Blanche	(United States) Trenton Estep (France) Marius Fossard (France) Valentin Hasse-Clot	Aston Martin AMR16A 4.0 L Turbo V8	142	+9 Laps
33	GTD	96	(United States) Turner Motorsport	(United States) Robby Foley (United States) Patrick Gallagher (United States) Francis Selldorff	BMW M4 GT3 Evo	142	+9 Laps
33	GTD	96	(United States) Turner Motorsport	(United States) Robby Foley (United States) Patrick Gallagher (United States) Francis Selldorff	BMW P58 3.0 L Turbo I6	142	+9 Laps
34	GTD	80	(United States) Lone Star Racing	(Australia) Scott Andrews (Netherlands) Lin Hodenius (Republic of Ireland) James Roe	Mercedes-AMG GT3 Evo	142	+9 Laps
34	GTD	80	(United States) Lone Star Racing	(Australia) Scott Andrews (Netherlands) Lin Hodenius (Republic of Ireland) James Roe	Mercedes-AMG M159 6.2 L V8	142	+9 Laps
35	GTD	13	(Canada) 13 Autosport	(United Kingdom) Matt Bell (Canada) Orey Fidani (Germany) Lars Kern	Chevrolet Corvette Z06 GT3.R	142	+9 Laps
35	GTD	13	(Canada) 13 Autosport	(United Kingdom) Matt Bell (Canada) Orey Fidani (Germany) Lars Kern	Chevrolet LT6.R 5.5 L V8	142	+9 Laps
36	GTD	70	(United Kingdom) Inception Racing	(United States) Brendan Iribe (Denmark) Frederik Schandorff (United Kingdom) Ollie Millroy	Ferrari 296 GT3 Evo	142	+9 Laps
36	GTD	70	(United Kingdom) Inception Racing	(United States) Brendan Iribe (Denmark) Frederik Schandorff (United Kingdom) Ollie Millroy	Ferrari F163CE 3.0 L Turbo V6	142	+9 Laps
37	GTD	12	(United States) Vasser Sullivan Racing	(Denmark) Benjamin Pedersen (United States) Aaron Telitz (United States) Frankie Montecalvo	Lexus RC F GT3	142	+9 Laps
37	GTD	12	(United States) Vasser Sullivan Racing	(Denmark) Benjamin Pedersen (United States) Aaron Telitz (United States) Frankie Montecalvo	Toyota 2UR-GSE 5.4 L V8	142	+9 Laps
38	GTD	28	(United States) RS1	(Belgium) Jan Heylen (Canada) Devlin DeFrancesco (New Zealand) Ryan Yardley	Porsche 911 GT3 R (992.2)	142	+9 Laps
38	GTD	28	(United States) RS1	(Belgium) Jan Heylen (Canada) Devlin DeFrancesco (New Zealand) Ryan Yardley	Porsche M97/80 4.2 L Flat-6	142	+9 Laps
39	GTD	21	(Italy) AF Corse USA	(Italy) Antonio Fuoco (United States) Simon Mann (France) Lilou Wadoux	Ferrari 296 GT3 Evo	142	+9 Laps
39	GTD	21	(Italy) AF Corse USA	(Italy) Antonio Fuoco (United States) Simon Mann (France) Lilou Wadoux	Ferrari F163CE 3.0 L Turbo V6	142	+9 Laps
40	GTD	45	(United States) Wayne Taylor Racing	(Costa Rica) Danny Formal (United States) Trent Hindman (United States) Graham Doyle	Lamborghini Huracán GT3 Evo 2	142	+9 Laps
40	GTD	45	(United States) Wayne Taylor Racing	(Costa Rica) Danny Formal (United States) Trent Hindman (United States) Graham Doyle	Lamborghini DGF 5.2 L V10	142	+9 Laps
41	GTD	66	(United States) Gradient Racing	(United States) Jake Walker (United Kingdom) Till Bechtolsheimer (United States) Joey Hand	Ford Mustang GT3 Evo	142	+9 Laps
41	GTD	66	(United States) Gradient Racing	(United States) Jake Walker (United Kingdom) Till Bechtolsheimer (United States) Joey Hand	Ford Coyote 5.4 L V8	142	+9 Laps
42	GTD	36	(United States) DXDT Racing	(United States) Mason Filippi (Republic of Ireland) Charlie Eastwood (Canada) Robert Wickens	Chevrolet Corvette Z06 GT3.R	142	+9 Laps
42	GTD	36	(United States) DXDT Racing	(United States) Mason Filippi (Republic of Ireland) Charlie Eastwood (Canada) Robert Wickens	Chevrolet LT6.R 5.5 L V8	142	+9 Laps
43	GTD Pro	911	(Germany) Manthey Racing	(Austria) Klaus Bachler (Austria) Thomas Preining	Porsche 911 GT3 R (992.2)	142	+9 Laps
43	GTD Pro	911	(Germany) Manthey Racing	(Austria) Klaus Bachler (Austria) Thomas Preining	Porsche M97/80 4.2 L Flat-6	142	+9 Laps
44	GTD	27	(United States) Heart of Racing Team	(Brazil) Eduardo Barrichello (United Kingdom) Tom Gamble (Canada) Zacharie Robichon	Aston Martin Vantage AMR GT3 Evo	142	+9 Laps
44	GTD	27	(United States) Heart of Racing Team	(Brazil) Eduardo Barrichello (United Kingdom) Tom Gamble (Canada) Zacharie Robichon	Aston Martin AMR16A 4.0 L Turbo V8	142	+9 Laps
45	GTD	912	(Germany) Manthey 1st Phorm	(United States) Ryan Hardwick (Italy) Riccardo Pera (Netherlands) Morris Schuring	Porsche 911 GT3 R (992.2)	142	+9 Laps
45	GTD	912	(Germany) Manthey 1st Phorm	(United States) Ryan Hardwick (Italy) Riccardo Pera (Netherlands) Morris Schuring	Porsche M97/80 4.2 L Flat-6	142	+9 Laps
46	GTD Pro	3	(United States) Corvette Racing by Pratt Miller Motorsports	(Spain) Antonio García (United Kingdom) Alexander Sims	Chevrolet Corvette Z06 GT3.R	136	+15 Laps
46	GTD Pro	3	(United States) Corvette Racing by Pratt Miller Motorsports	(Spain) Antonio García (United Kingdom) Alexander Sims	Chevrolet LT6.R 5.5 L V8	136	+15 Laps
47	GTD Pro	1	(United States) Paul Miller Racing	(United States) Connor De Phillippi (United States) Neil Verhagen	BMW M4 GT3 Evo	134	+17 Laps
47	GTD Pro	1	(United States) Paul Miller Racing	(United States) Connor De Phillippi (United States) Neil Verhagen	BMW P58 3.0 L Turbo I6	134	+17 Laps
48 DNF	GTD	120	(United States) Wright Motorsports	(United States) Adam Adelson (United Kingdom) Callum Ilott (Australia) Tom Sargent	Porsche 911 GT3 R (992.2)	126	Crash
48 DNF	GTD	120	(United States) Wright Motorsports	(United States) Adam Adelson (United Kingdom) Callum Ilott (Australia) Tom Sargent	Porsche M97/80 4.2 L Flat-6	126	Crash
49 DNF	GTP	24	(Belgium) BMW M Team WRT	(South Africa) Sheldon van der Linde (Belgium) Dries Vanthoor	BMW M Hybrid V8	115	Brakes
49 DNF	GTP	24	(Belgium) BMW M Team WRT	(South Africa) Sheldon van der Linde (Belgium) Dries Vanthoor	BMW P66/3 4.0 L Turbo V8	115	Brakes
50 DNF	GTD Pro	59	(United States) RLL Team McLaren	(United States) Max Esterson (United States) Nikita Johnson	McLaren 720S GT3 Evo	113	Steering
50 DNF	GTD Pro	59	(United States) RLL Team McLaren	(United States) Max Esterson (United States) Nikita Johnson	McLaren M840T 4.0 L Turbo V8	113	Steering
51 DNF	GTD	34	(United States) Conquest Racing	(Spain) Albert Costa (Italy) Lorenzo Patrese	Ferrari 296 GT3 Evo	56	Crash
51 DNF	GTD	34	(United States) Conquest Racing	(Spain) Albert Costa (Italy) Lorenzo Patrese	Ferrari F163CE 3.0 L Turbo V6	56	Crash
52 DNF	LMP2	73	(United States) Pratt Miller Motorsports	(Canada) Chris Cumming (Brazil) Pietro Fittipaldi (Portugal) Manuel Espírito Santo	Oreca 07	55	Suspension
52 DNF	LMP2	73	(United States) Pratt Miller Motorsports	(Canada) Chris Cumming (Brazil) Pietro Fittipaldi (Portugal) Manuel Espírito Santo	Gibson GK428 4.2 L V8	55	Suspension
53 DNF	LMP2	37	(United States) Intersport Racing	(United States) Jon Field (United Kingdom) Oliver Jarvis (Netherlands) Max van der Snel	Oreca 07	13	Crash
53 DNF	LMP2	37	(United States) Intersport Racing	(United States) Jon Field (United Kingdom) Oliver Jarvis (Netherlands) Max van der Snel	Gibson GK428 4.2 L V8	13	Crash
54 DNF	GTD	16	(United States) Myers Riley Motorsports	(Brazil) Felipe Fraga (United States) Sheena Monk (United States) Jenson Altzman	Ford Mustang GT3 Evo	4	Incident
54 DNF	GTD	16	(United States) Myers Riley Motorsports	(Brazil) Felipe Fraga (United States) Sheena Monk (United States) Jenson Altzman	Ford Coyote 5.4 L V8	4	Incident

IMSA SportsCar Championship
Previous race: Chevrolet Grand Prix	2026 season	Next race: Michelin GT Challenge at VIR
