= 2021 Ferrari Challenge North America =

The 2021 Ferrari Challenge North America was the 28th season of the Ferrari Challenge competition in North America. The season was 7 rounds, starting at the Virginia International Raceway on March 27 and concluding at the Mugello Circuit on November 20.

== Calendar ==
Rnd.	Circuit	Dates
1	(United States) Virginia International Raceway	27–28 March
2	(United States) Sonoma Raceway	1–2 May
3	(United States) Watkins Glen International Raceway	22–23 May
4	(United States) Homestead–Miami Speedway	12–13 June
5	(United States) Indianapolis Motor Speedway	17–18 July
6	(United States) Road America	11–12 September
7	(Italy) Mugello Circuit	19–20 November

== Entry list ==
All teams and drivers used the Ferrari 488 Challenge Evo fitted with Pirelli tyres. At round 7 in Mugello Ferrari Challenge North America entries ran with a different numbers, trofeo pirelli entries with their number in the 200's and Coppa Shell entries with their number in the 300's.

=== Trofeo Pirelli ===
Team	No.	Driver	Class	Rounds
(United States) Ferrari of Beverly Hills	2	(China) Key-Sin Chen	Pro-Am #2	All
(United States) Foreign Cars Italia	5	(United States) Bradley Horstmann	Pro-Am #2	1–6
(United States) Ferrari of Palm Beach	8	(United States) Brian Davis	Pro-Am #2	All
(United States) Ferrari of Long Island	9	(United States) Alfred Caiola	Pro-Am #2	3
(United States) Ferrari of Long Island	23	(United States) John Megrue	Pro-Am #2	1–2
(United States) Ferrari of Long Island	28	(United States) Joe Rubbo	Pro-Am #1	6
(United States) Ferrari of Long Island	71	(United States) Brian Kaminskey	Pro-Am #2	3
(Canada) Ferrari of Ontario	13	(Canada) Marc Muzzo	Pro-Am #2	3–4, 6
(Canada) Ferrari of Ontario	99	(Canada) Barry Zekelman	Pro-Am #1	1, 5
(United States) Ferrari of Newport Beach	14	(United States) Brent Holden	Pro-Am #1	2, 4–6
(United States) Ferrari of Newport Beach	67	(United States) John Horejsi	Pro-Am #2	1, 3
(United States) Wide World Ferrari	15	(United States) Jason McCarthy	Pro-Am #2	All
(United States) Ferrari of Central Florida	16	(United States) Frank Selldorff	Pro-Am #2	3
(United States) Ferrari of Central Florida	21	(United States) Jordan Workman	Pro-Am #1	1, 3–6
(United States) Ferrari of Central Florida	22	(Venezuela) Enzo Potolicchio	Pro-Am #1	2, 6–7
(United States) Ferrari of Central Florida	33	(United States) Justin Wetherill	Pro-Am #2	1–6
(United States) Ferrari of Central Florida	44	(Germany) Christian Potolicchio	Pro-Am #1	7
(United States) The Collection	17	(United States) Amir Kermani	Pro-Am #1	5
(United States) Ferrari of San Francisco	18	(United States) James Weiland	Pro-Am #1	3
(United States) Ferrari of Detroit	22	(United States) Jay Schreibmann	Pro-Am #2	1, 4–5
(United States) Ferrari of Detroit	51	(United States) Jay Schreibmann	Pro-Am #2	6
(United States) Ferrari Lake Forest	30	(United States) David Musial	Pro-Am #1	1–6
(United States) Ferrari Westlake	32	(United States) Brett Curtis	Pro-Am #1	1
(United States) Ferrari Westlake	63	(United States) Cooper MacNeil	Pro	1–4, 7
(United States) Continental AutoSports	36	(United States) Neil Gehani	Pro-Am #1	1–2, 4, 6
(United States) Continental AutoSports	72	(United States) Aaron Weiss	Pro-Am #1	3
(United States) Ferrari of San Diego	38	(United States) Kevin Millstein	Pro-Am #2	1, 3
(United States) Ferrari of Fort Lauderdale	46	(United States) Martin Burrowes	Pro-Am #1	1–6
(Canada) Ferrari of Vancouver	67	(United States) John Horejsi	Pro-Am #2	5–7
(United States) Ferrari of Central New Jersey	72	(United States) Aaron Weiss	Pro-Am #1	5

=== Coppa Shell ===
Team	No.	Driver	Class	Rounds
(United States) Ferrari of Palm Beach	100	(United States) Anthony DeCarlo	Am	1–6
(United States) Ferrari of Palm Beach	134	(Puerto Rico) David Schmitt	Am	1–2
(United States) Ferrari of Beverly Hills	109	(United Kingdom) Franck Ruimy	Am	1–4
(United States) Ferrari of Beverly Hills	127	(United States) Lisa Clark	Am	All
(United States) Ferrari of Beverly Hills	182	(United States) Joseph Sposato	Am	2
(United States) Ferrari of Beverly Hills	187	(United States) Jeremy Clarke	Pro-Am	5–7
(United States) Ferrari Lake Forest	111	(United States) Manny Franco	Pro-Am	6–7
(United States) Ferrari Lake Forest	130	(United States) David Musial, Jr.	Pro-Am	1–6
(Canada) Ferrari of Ontario	112	(Canada) Mike Louli	Pro-Am	4–6
(Canada) Ferrari of Ontario	139	(Canada) John Cervini	Am	2–7
(United States) Ferrari of Central Florida	116	(United States) Frank Selldorff	Pro-Am	4–5
(United States) Ferrari of Central Florida	131	(Mexico) Luis Perusquia	Am	6–7
(United States) Ferrari of Central Florida	166	(United States) Charles Whittall	Pro-Am	1–6
(United States) Ferrari of Central Florida	199	(United States) Brandon Kruse	Am	1
(United States) Ferrari of San Francisco	118	(United States) Matt Cain	Am	5
(United States) Ferrari of San Francisco	157	(United States) Jesus Mendoza	Pro-Am	2–5
(United States) Ferrari of San Francisco	160	(United States) Brad Fauvre	Am	5
(United States) Ferrari of Houston	119	(United States) Christopher Aitken	Pro-Am	1–6
(United States) Ferrari of Houston	123	(United States) Brett Jacobson	Am	3–7
(United States) Foreign Cars Italia	121	(United States) Roy Carroll	Am	All
(United States) Ferrari of Austin	122	(United States) Frank Szczesniak III	Am	5
(United States) Ferrari of Austin	123	(United States) Brett Jacobson	Am	1–2
(United States) Ferrari of Austin	163	(United States) Dan Cornish	Am	3–6
(United States) Ferrari Westlake	126	(United States) Eric Marston	Pro-Am	1
(United States) Ferrari of Detroit	128	(United States) Robert Hertzberg	Am	5
(United States) Ferrari of Tampa Bay	131	(Mexico) Luis Perusquia	Am	1–4
(United States) Ferrari of Seattle	132	(United States) Yahn Bernier	Pro-Am	All
(United States) Continental AutoSports	133	(United States) Paul Kiebler	Am	1–6
(United States) Ferrari of Central New Jersey	141	(United States) Jeffrey Nunberg	Am	2–7
(United States) Ferrari of Atlanta	150	(United States) Michael Watt	Pro-Am	1–5
(United States) Ferrari of Atlanta	176	(United States) Lance Cawley	Am	All
(United States) Ferrari South Bay	153	(United States) Neil Langberg	Am	1–6
(United States) Ferrari of New England	155	(United States) Ian Campbell	Pro-Am	2, 4–6
(Canada) Ferrari of Quebec	165	(Canada) Gianni Grilli	Pro-Am	3–5
(Canada) Ferrari of Quebec	172	(Canada) Benoit Bergeron	Am	2–7
(United States) Ferrari of Denver	169	(United States) Todd Coleman	Pro-Am	All
(United States) Ferrari of Denver	173	(United States) Sureel Choksi	Pro-Am	1–6
(United States) Ferrari of Newport Beach	178	(United States) Al Hegyi	Am	3, 5
(United States) Ferrari of Long Island	179	(United States) Eileen Bildman	Am	1, 3–5
(United States) Boardwalk Ferrari	189	(United States) John Viskup	Pro-Am	2–4
(United States) Miller Motor Cars	193	(Chile) Osvaldo Gaio	Pro-Am	1
(United States) Miller Motor Cars	200	(South Korea) Joe Sun Park	Pro-Am	7
(United States) Ferrari of Fort Lauderdale	196	(United States) Omar Balkissoon	Am	5–6

== Results and standings ==
=== Race results ===
Round	Race	Circuit	Pole position	Fastest lap	Trofeo Pirelli Winners	Coppa Shell Winners
1	1	(United States) Virginia International Raceway	TP Pro: (United States) Cooper MacNeil; TP Pro-Am #1: (United States) Martin Burrowes; TP Pro-Am #2: (United States) John Megrue; CS Pro-Am: (United States) David Musial, Jr. CS Am: (United Kingdom) Franck Ruimy	TP Pro: (United States) Cooper MacNeil; TP Pro-Am #1: (United States) Jordan Workman; TP Pro-Am #2: (United States) Jason McCarthy; CS Pro-Am: (United States) David Musial, Jr. CS Am: (United Kingdom) Franck Ruimy	Pro: (United States) Cooper MacNeil; Ferrari Westlake; Pro-Am #1: (Canada) Martin Burrowes; Ferrari of Fort Lauderdale; Pro-Am #2: (United States) Jason McCarthy; Wide World Ferrari	Pro-Am: (United States) Todd Coleman; Ferrari of Denver; Am: (United States) Brandon Kruse; Ferrari of Central Florida
1	2	(United States) Virginia International Raceway	TP Pro: (United States) Cooper MacNeil; TP Pro-Am #1: (Canada) Martin Burrowes; TP Pro-Am #2: (United States) Jason McCarthy; CS Pro-Am: (United States) Christopher Aitken; CS Am: (United Kingdom) Franck Ruimy	TP Pro: (United States) Cooper MacNeil; TP Pro-Am #1: (United States) Martin Burrowes; TP Pro-Am #2: (United States) Jason McCarthy; CS Pro-Am: (United States) Todd Coleman; CS Am: (United States) Lance Cawley	Pro: (United States) Cooper MacNeil; Ferrari Westlake; Pro-Am #1: (United States) Neil Gehani; Continental AutoSports; Pro-Am #2: (United States) Jason McCarthy; Wide World Ferrari	Pro-Am: (United States) Todd Coleman; Ferrari of Denver; Am: (United States) Brandon Kruse; Ferrari of Central Florida
2	1	(United States) Sonoma Raceway	TP Pro: (United States) Cooper MacNeil; TP Pro-Am #1: (Canada) Martin Burrowes; TP Pro-Am #2: (United States) Jason McCarthy; CS Pro-Am: (United States) Christopher Aitken; CS Am: (United Kingdom) Franck Ruimy	TP Pro: (United States) Cooper MacNeil; TP Pro-Am #1: (Venezuela) Enzo Potolicchio; TP Pro-Am #2: (United States) Jason McCarthy; CS Pro-Am: (United States) Yahn Bernier; CS Am: (United Kingdom) Franck Ruimy	Pro: (United States) Cooper MacNeil; Ferrari Westlake; Pro-Am #1: (Venezuela) Enzo Potolicchio; Ferrari of Central Florida; Pro-Am #2: (United States) Jason McCarthy; Wide World Ferrari	Pro-Am: (United States) Michael Watt; Ferrari of Atlanta; Am: (United Kingdom) Franck Ruimy; Ferrari of Beverly Hills
2	2	(United States) Sonoma Raceway	TP Pro: (United States) Cooper MacNeil; TP Pro-Am #1: (Canada) Martin Burrowes; TP Pro-Am #2: (United States) Jason McCarthy; CS Pro-Am: (United States) Dave Musial Jr; CS Am: (United States) Brett Jacobson	TP Pro: (United States) Cooper MacNeil; TP Pro-Am #1: (Venezuela) Enzo Potolicchio; TP Pro-Am #2: (United States) Jason McCarthy; CS Pro-Am: CS Am: (United Kingdom) Franck Ruimy	Pro: (United States) Cooper MacNeil; Ferrari Westlake; Pro-Am #1: (Canada) Martin Burrowes; Ferrari of Fort Lauderdale; Pro-Am #2: (United States) Jason McCarthy; Wide World Ferrari	Pro-Am: (United States) Dave Musial Jr; Ferrari Lake Forest; Am: (United Kingdom) Franck Ruimy; Ferrari of Beverly Hills
3	1	(United States) Watkins Glen International Raceway	TP Pro: (United States) Cooper MacNeil; TP Pro-Am #1: (Canada) Martin Burrowes; TP Pro-Am #2: (United States) Jason McCarthy; CS Pro-Am: (United States) Dave Musial Jr; CS Am: (Canada) John Cervini	TP Pro: (United States) Cooper MacNeil; TP Pro-Am #1: (Canada) Martin Burrowes; TP Pro-Am #2: (United States) Brian Davis; CS Pro-Am: (United States) Christopher Aitken; CS Am: (United States) Roy Carroll	Pro: (United States) Cooper MacNeil; Ferrari Westlake; Pro-Am #1: (Canada) Martin Burrowes; Ferrari of Fort Lauderdale; Pro-Am #2: (United States) Jason McCarthy; Wide World Ferrari	Pro-Am: (United States) Dave Musial Jr; Ferrari Lake Forest; Am: (Canada) John Cervini; Ferrari of Ontario
3	2	(United States) Watkins Glen International Raceway	TP Pro: (United States) Cooper MacNeil; TP Pro-Am #1: (Canada) Martin Burrowes; TP Pro-Am #2: (United States) Jason McCarthy; CS Pro-Am: (United States) Christopher Aitken; CS Am: (Canada) John Cervini	TP Pro: (United States) Cooper MacNeil; TP Pro-Am #1: (Canada) Martin Burrowes; TP Pro-Am #2: (United States) Brian Davis; CS Pro-Am: (United States) Todd Coleman; CS Am: (Canada) John Cervini	Pro: (United States) Cooper MacNeil; Ferrari Westlake; Pro-Am #1: (Canada) Martin Burrowes; Ferrari of Fort Lauderdale; Pro-Am #2: (United States) Jason McCarthy; Wide World Ferrari	Pro-Am: (United States) Todd Coleman; Ferrari of Denver; Am: (Canada) John Cervini; Ferrari of Ontario
4	1	(United States) Homestead–Miami Speedway	TP Pro: (United States) Cooper MacNeil; TP Pro-Am #1: (Canada) Martin Burrowes; TP Pro-Am #2: (United States) Jason McCarthy; CS Pro-Am: (United States) Christopher Aitken; CS Am: (Canada) John Cervini	TP Pro: (United States) Cooper MacNeil; TP Pro-Am #1: (Canada) Martin Burrowes; TP Pro-Am #2: (United States) Bradley Horstmann; CS Pro-Am: (United States) David Musial, Jr. CS Am: (Canada) John Cervini	Pro: (United States) Cooper MacNeil; Ferrari Westlake; Pro-Am #1: (Canada) Martin Burrowes; Ferrari of Fort Lauderdale; Pro-Am #2: (United States) Jason McCarthy; Wide World Ferrari	Pro-Am: (United States) David Musial, Jr. Ferrari Lake Forest; Am: (Canada) John Cervini; Ferrari of Ontario
4	2	(United States) Homestead–Miami Speedway	TP Pro: (United States) Cooper MacNeil; TP Pro-Am #1: (United States) David Musial; TP Pro-Am #2: (United States) Jason McCarthy; CS Pro-Am: (United States) Christopher Aitken; CS Am: (Canada) John Cervini	TP Pro: (United States) Cooper MacNeil; TP Pro-Am #1: (Canada) Martin Burrowes; TP Pro-Am #2: (China) Key-Sin Chen; CS Pro-Am: (United States) Michael Watt; CS Am: (Canada) John Cervini	Pro: (United States) Cooper MacNeil; Ferrari Westlake; Pro-Am #1: (United States) Jordan Workman; Ferrari of Central Florida; Pro-Am #2: (China) Key-Sin Chen; Ferrari of Beverly Hills	Pro-Am: (United States) Michael Watt; Ferrari of Atlanta; Am: (Canada) John Cervini; Ferrari of Ontario
5	1	(United States) Indianapolis Motor Speedway	TP Pro: (Germany) Oliver Koch; TP Pro-Am #1: (United States) Bradley Horstmann; TP Pro-Am #2: (United States) Jason McCarthy; CS Pro-Am: (United States) Jeremy Clarke; CS Am: (United States) Brad Fauvre	TP Pro: (Germany) Oliver Koch; TP Pro-Am #1: (United States) Jordan Workman; TP Pro-Am #2: (United States) Jason McCarthy; CS Pro-Am: (United States) Jeremy Clarke; CS Am: (United States) Brad Fauvre	Pro: (Germany) Oliver Koch; DRT Racing; Pro-Am #1: (United States) Jordan Workman; Ferrari of Central Florida; Pro-Am #2: (United States) Jason McCarthy; Wide World Ferrari	Pro-Am: (United States) Jeremy Clarke; Ferrari of Beverly Hills; Am: (United States) Brad Fauvre; Ferrari of San Francisco
5	2	(United States) Indianapolis Motor Speedway	TP Pro: (Germany) Oliver Koch; TP Pro-Am #1: (United States) Jordan Workman; TP Pro-Am #2: (United States) Jason McCarthy; CS Pro-Am: (United States) Todd Coleman; CS Am: (United States) Brad Fauvre	TP Pro: (Germany) Oliver Koch; TP Pro-Am #1: (Canada) Barry Zekelman; TP Pro-Am #2: (United States) Jason McCarthy; CS Pro-Am: (United States) Jeremy Clarke; CS Am: (United States) Brad Fauvre	Pro: (Germany) Oliver Koch; DRT Racing; Pro-Am #1: (Canada) Barry Zekelman; Ferrari of Ontario; Pro-Am #2: (United States) Jason McCarthy; Wide World Ferrari	Pro-Am: (United States) Jeremy Clarke; Ferrari of Beverly Hills; Am: (United States) Brad Fauvre; Ferrari of San Francisco
6	1	(United States) Road America	TP Pro: (Germany) Oliver Koch; TP Pro-Am #1: (United States) Jordan Workman; TP Pro-Am #2: (United States) Jason McCarthy; CS Pro-Am: (United States) Jeremy Clarke; CS Am: (Canada) John Cervini	TP Pro: (Germany) Oliver Koch; TP Pro-Am #1: (United States) Jordan Workman; TP Pro-Am #2: (United States) Jason McCarthy; CS Pro-Am: CS Am: (Canada) John Cervini	Pro: (Germany) Oliver Koch; DRT Racing; Pro-Am #1: (United States) David Musial, Jr. Ferrari Lake Forest; Pro-Am #2: (United States) Jason McCarthy; Wide World Ferrari	Pro-Am: (United States) Manny Franco; Ferrari Lake Forest; Am: (Canada) John Cervini; Ferrari of Ontario
6	2	(United States) Road America	TP Pro: (Germany) Oliver Koch; TP Pro-Am #1: (United States) Jordan Workman; TP Pro-Am #2: (United States) Jason McCarthy; CS Pro-Am: (Canada) Benoit Bergeron; CS Am: (Canada) John Cervini	TP Pro: (Germany) Oliver Koch; TP Pro-Am #1: (United States) Jordan Workman; TP Pro-Am #2: (United States) Jason McCarthy; CS Pro-Am: (United States) Todd Coleman; CS Am: (Canada) John Cervini	Pro: (Germany) Oliver Koch; DRT Racing; Pro-Am #1: (United States) Jordan Workman; Ferrari of Central Florida; Pro-Am #2: (United States) Jason McCarthy; Wide World Ferrari	Pro-Am: (United States) Jeremy Clarke; Ferrari of Beverly Hills; Am: (Canada) John Cervini; Ferrari of Ontario
7	1	(Italy) Mugello Circuit	TP Pro: (United States) Cooper MacNeil; TP Pro-Am #1: (Venezuela) Enzo Potolicchio; TP Pro-Am #2: (United States) Jason McCarthy; CS Pro-Am: (United States) Todd Coleman; CS Am: (Canada) John Cervini	TP Pro: (United States) Cooper MacNeil; TP Pro-Am #1: (Germany) Christian Potolicchio; TP Pro-Am #2: (China) Key-Sin Chen; CS Pro-Am: (United States) Todd Coleman; CS Am: (Canada) John Cervini	Pro: (United States) Cooper MacNeil; Ferrari Westlake; Pro-Am #1: (Germany) Christian Potolicchio; Ferrari of Central Florida; Pro-Am #2: (United States) Jason McCarthy; Wide World Ferrari	Pro-Am: (United States) Todd Coleman; Ferrari of Denver; Am: (Canada) John Cervini; Ferrari of Ontario
7	2	(Italy) Mugello Circuit	TP Pro: (United States) Cooper MacNeil; TP Pro-Am #1: (Germany) Christian Potolicchio; TP Pro-Am #2: (United States) Jason McCarthy; CS Pro-Am: (United States) Todd Coleman; CS Am: (Canada) John Cervini	TP Pro: (United States) Cooper MacNeil; TP Pro-Am #1: (Germany) Christian Potolicchio; TP Pro-Am #2: (China) Key-Sin Chen; CS Pro-Am: (United States) Todd Coleman; CS Am: (Canada) John Cervini	Pro: (United States) Cooper MacNeil; Ferrari Westlake; Pro-Am #1: (Germany) Christian Potolicchio; Ferrari of Central Florida; Pro-Am #2: (United States) Jason McCarthy; Wide World Ferrari	Pro-Am: (United States) Todd Coleman; Ferrari of Denver; Am: (Canada) John Cervini; Ferrari of Ontario

=== Championship standings ===
Points were awarded to the top ten classified finishers as follows:

Race Position	1st	2nd	3rd	4th	5th	6th	7th	8th or lower	Pole	FLap
Points	15	12	10	8	6	4	2	1	1	1

Trofeo Pirelli

Pos.	Driver	(United States) VIR		(United States) SON		(United States) WTG		(United States) HOM		(United States) IMS		(United States) ROA		(Italy) MUG		Points
Pos.	Driver	RD1	RD2	RD1	RD2	RD1	RD2	RD1	RD2	RD1	RD2	RD1	RD2	RD1	RD2	Points
Pro Class
1	(United States) Cooper MacNeil	1	1	1	1	1	1	1	1					1	1	33
2	(Germany) Oliver Koch									1	1	1	1			0
3	(Brazil) Matheus Leist									2	2	2	2	2	2	0
4	(Japan) Kinya Wada							2	Ret					3	3	0
Pro-Am Class #1
1	(Canada) Martin Burrowes	1	2	2	1	1	1	1	3	4	3	Ret	4			29
2	(Canada) Barry Zekelman	2	4							6	1					20
3	(United States) David Musial	3	3	4	4	3	2	3	2	2	4	1	2			20
4	(United States) Neil Gehani	6	1	3	3			5	Ret			3	Ret			19
5	(United States) Brett Curtis	4	DNS													8
6	(United States) Jordan Workman	5	DNS			Ret	DNS	2	1	1	2	2	1			7
7	(United States) Jean-Claude Saada	DNS	DNS													0
	(Venezuela) Enzo Potolicchio			1	2							Ret	Ret	Ret	Ret	
	(United States) Aaron Weiss					2	Ret			3	5					
	(United States) James Weiland					Ret	DNS									
	(United States) Amir Kermani									5	Ret					
	(United States) Joe Rubbo											4	3			
	(Germany) Christian Potolicchio													1	1	
	(United States) Brent Holden			Ret	DNS			Ret	DNS	DNQ	DNQ	DNS	DNS			
Pro-Am Class #2
1	(United States) Jason McCarthy	1	1	1	1	1	1	1	Ret	1	1	1	1	1	1	32
2	(United States) Brian Davis	3	3	3	3	2	2	2	2	INF	Ret	3	Ret	2	2	20
3	(United States) John Megrue	6	2	Ret	5											17
4	(United States) Bradley Horstmann	4	4	DNS	DNS	7	DNS	5	4	Ret	5	2	3			16
5	(China) Key-Sin Chen	2	8	2	2	5	4	3	1	2	4	DNQ	2	3	3	13
6	(United States) John Horejsi	7	5			3	Ret			4	3			DNS	DNS	8
7	(United States) Justin Wetherill	5	9	4	4	DNS	3	Ret	DNS	DNS	2	4	5			7
8	(United States) Kevin Millstein	8	6			Ret	6									5
9	(United States) Jay Schreibmann	9	7					4	3	3	DNS	Ret	DNS			3
	(United States) Alfred Caiola					Ret	Ret									
	(United States) Brian Kaminskey					4	5									
	(Canada) Marc Muzzo					AT	NPQ	DNS	DSQ			5	4			
	(United States) Frank Selldorff					6	DNF									

Coppa Shell

Pos.	Driver	(United States) VIR		(United States) SON		(United States) WTG		(United States) HOM		(United States) IMS		(United States) ROA		(Italy) MUG		Points
Pos.	Driver	RD1	RD2	RD1	RD2	RD1	RD2	RD1	RD2	RD1	RD2	RD1	RD2	RD1	RD2	Points
Pro-Am Class
1	(United States) Todd Coleman	1	1	3	3	Ret	1	4	Ret	8	4	3	5	1	1	31
2	(United States) David Musial, Jr.	2	4	4	1	1	3	1	2	4	3	2	4			22
3	(United States) Yahn Bernier	5	2	6	7	6	6	11	9	7	7	8	7	3	4	18
4	(United States) Charles Whittall	3	5	9	6	7	8	8	8	9	6	6	8			16
5	(United States) Christopher Aitken	6	3	2	4	Ret	2	3	3	2	Ret	Ret	6			14
6	(United States) Michael Watt	4	8	1	10	4	7	5	1	6	5					9
7	(United States) Sureel Choksi	8	6	8	8	3	10	9	7	5	Ret	9	9			5
8	(United States) Eric Marston	7	7													4
9	(Chile) Osvaldo Gaio	9	DNS													1
10	(United States) John Viskup, Jr.	DNS	DNS	10	9	5	5	13	10	DNQ	Wth					0
	(Canada) Benoit Bergeron			5	2	2	4	6	6	3	2	5	3	2	2	
	(United States) Ian Campbell			7	5			2	4	DNS	DNS	7	10			
	(Canada) Gianni Grilli					8	9	12	DNS	DNS	DNS					
	(United States) Frank Selldorff							7	5	Ret	DNS					
	(Canada) Mike Louli							10	11	10	8	Ret	11			
	(United States) Jeremy Clarke									1	1	4	1	5	5	
	(United States) Manny Franco											1	2	6	3	
	(South Korea) Joe Sun Park													4	6	
Am Class
1	(United States) Brandon Kruse	1	1													30
2	(United States) Lance Cawley	3	2	2	4	3	3	3	4	4	2	7	5	2	2	23
3	(United States) Roy Carroll	4	3	3	5	2	5	11	5	2	Ret	3	3	8	5	18
4	(United Kingdom) Franck Ruimy	2	DNS	1	1	4	2	2	2							14
5	(Puerto Rico) David Schmitt	5	4	Ret	DNS											14
6	(United States) Lisa Clark	7	5	4	8	9	4	5	3	Ret	Ret	9	7	5	7	8
7	(United States) Paul Keibler	6	7	7	12	6	13	10	Ret	7	8	2	Ret			6
8	(United States) Anthony DeCarlo	9	6	8	9	Ret	9	6	9	Ret	DNS	10	8			5
9	(Mexico) Luis Perusquia	8	8	9	7	11	6	Ret	7			8	Ret	6	8	2
10	(United States) Neil Langberg	11	9	10	13	12	12	9	Ret	9	6	12	9			2
11	(United States) Brett Jacobson	10	11	12	2	5	10	Ret	6	5	Ret	5	2	3	3	2
12	(United States) Eileen Bildman	12	10			7	11	8	8	11	7					2
	(United States) Joseph Sposato			5	3											
	(Canada) John Cervini			6	10	1	1	1	1	3	3	1	1	1	1	
	(United States) Jesus Mendoza			11	6	13	Ret	Ret	11	8	10					
	(United States) Jeffrey Nunberg			13	11	14	8	7	12	14	9	11	DNS	7	6	
	(United States) Dan Cornish					8	7	4	10	Wth	4	6	4			
	(United States) Al Hegyi					10	Ret			12	DNQ					
	(United States) Brad Fauvre									1	1					
	(United States) Frank Szczesniak III									6	11					
	(United States) Robert Hertzberg									10	DSQ					
	(United States) Omar Balkissoon									13	5	4	6			
	(United States) Matt Cain									Ret	DNS					
	(United States) Kirk Bearwaldt													4	4	
