= 2026 Chevrolet Grand Prix =

Seventh round of the 2026 IMSA SportsCar Championship season

The layout of Canadian Tire Motorsports Park, where the race will be held

The 2026 Chevrolet Grand Prix was a sports car race that was held at Canadian Tire Motorsports Park in Bowmanville, Ontario, Canada, on July 12, 2026. It was the seventh round of the 2026 IMSA SportsCar Championship.

== Background ==
=== Preview ===
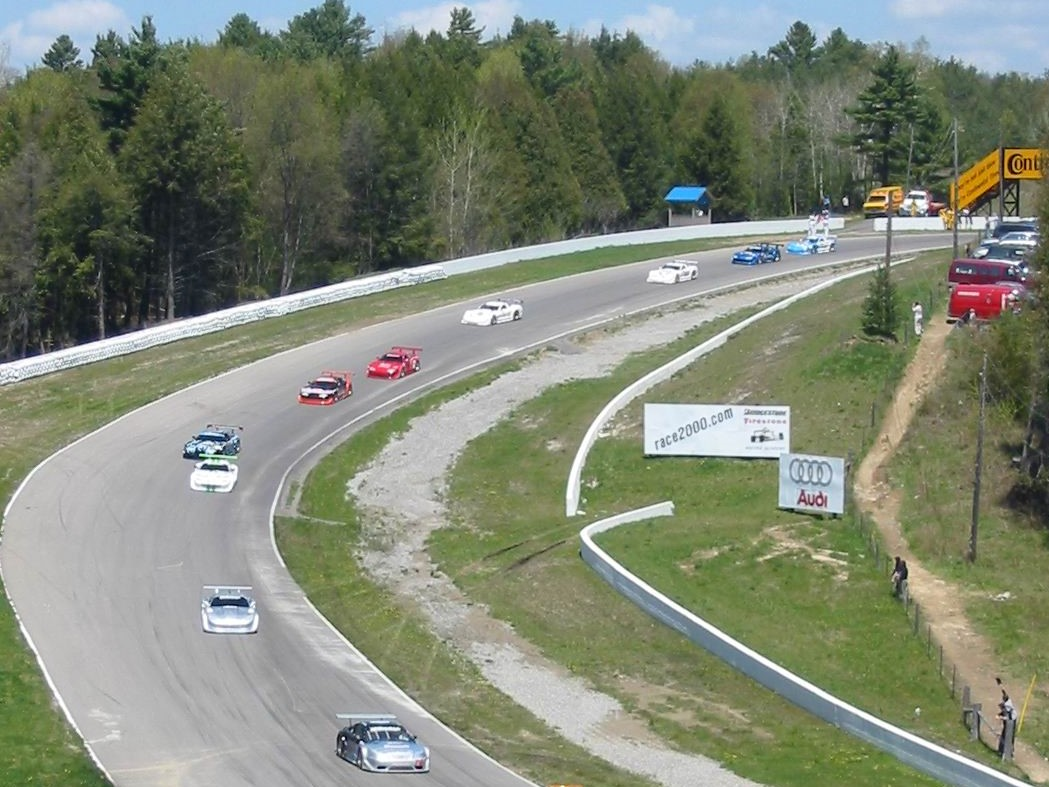
Canadian Tire Motorsports Park, where the race will be held

International Motor Sports Association (IMSA) president John Doonan confirmed the race was part of the schedule of the 2026 IMSA SportsCar Championship (IMSA SCC) in March 2025. It was the eleventh time the IMSA SCC hosted a race at Mosport, and the third consecutive time the race was hosted at the Canadian Tire Motorsports Park. The 2026 Chevrolet Grand Prix will be the seventh of eleven scheduled sports car races of 2026 by IMSA. The race was held at the ten-turn 2.459 mi (3.957 km) Canadian Tire Motorsports Park on July 12, 2026.

== Practice ==
Two practice sessions were held preceding the start of the race on Sunday, one on Friday and on Saturday. The first session lasted 90 minutes Friday afternoon, and the second session on Saturday morning also lasted 90 minutes.

=== Practice 1 ===
The first practice took place at 1:55 pm ET on Friday.

Pos.	Class	No.	Team	Driver	Time	Gap
1	LMP2	52	(United States) Bryan Herta Autosport with PR1/Mathiasen	(United States) Ricky Taylor	1:08.080	—
2	LMP2	8	(Canada) Tower Motorsports	(Mexico) Sebastián Álvarez	1:08.178	+0.098
3	LMP2	04	(United States) CrowdStrike Racing by APR	(United Kingdom) Alex Quinn	1:08.287	+0.207

=== Practice 2 ===
The second and final practice session took place at 10:35 am ET on Saturday.

Pos.	Class	No.	Team	Driver	Time	Gap
1	LMP2	52	(United States) Bryan Herta Autosport with PR1/Mathiasen	(United States) Ricky Taylor	1:07.812	—
2	LMP2	43	(Poland) Inter Europol Competition	(France) Tom Dillmann	1:07.953	+0.141
3	LMP2	11	(France) TDS Racing	(Switzerland) Mathias Beche	1:08.405	+0.593

== Qualifying ==
=== Qualifying results ===
Pole positions in each class are indicated in bold and with ‡.

Pos.	Class	No.	Entry	Driver	Time	Gap	Grid
1	**LMP2**	**43**	**(Poland) Inter Europol Competition**	**(United States) Jeremy Clarke**	**1:07.904**	—	1‡
2	LMP2	52	(United States) Bryan Herta Autosport with PR1/Mathiasen	(Canada) Misha Goikhberg	1:08.077	+0.173	2
3	LMP2	99	(United States) AO Racing	(United States) P. J. Hyett	1:08.186	+0.282	9
4	LMP2	22	(United States) United Autosports USA	(United States) Dan Goldburg	1:08.297	+0.393	3
5	LMP2	04	(United States) CrowdStrike Racing by APR	(United States) George Kurtz	1:08.497	+0.593	4
6	LMP2	2	(United States) United Autosports USA	(Canada) Phil Fayer	1:09.341	+1.437	5
7	LMP2	73	(United States) Pratt Miller Motorsports	(Canada) Chris Cumming	1:09.715	+1.811	6
8	LMP2	11	(France) TDS Racing	(Canada) Tobias Lütke	1:09.754	+1.850	7
9	LMP2	8	(Canada) Tower Motorsports	(Canada) John Farano	1:10.410	+2.506	8
10	**GTD Pro**	**1**	**(United States) Paul Miller Racing**	**(United States) Neil Verhagen**	**1:14.382**	**+6.478**	10‡
11	GTD Pro	59	(United States) RLL Team McLaren	(United States) Max Esterson	1:14.567	+6.663	11
12	GTD Pro	3	(United States) Corvette Racing by Pratt Miller Motorsports	(United Kingdom) Alexander Sims	1:14.569	+6.665	12
13	GTD Pro	4	(United States) Corvette Racing by Pratt Miller Motorsports	(Netherlands) Nicky Catsburg	1:14.605	+6.701	13
14	GTD Pro	68	(United States) Car Blanche	(Australia) Scott Andrews	1:14.833	+6.929	14
15	GTD Pro	14	(United States) Vasser Sullivan Racing	(United Kingdom) Jack Hawksworth	1:14.865	+6.961	15
16	**GTD**	**27**	**(United States) Heart of Racing Team**	**(Brazil) Eduardo Barrichello**	**1:15.130**	**+7.226**	20‡
17	GTD Pro	77	(United States) AO Racing	(United Kingdom) Harry King	1:15.134	+7.230	16
18	GTD Pro	9	(Canada) Pfaff Motorsports	(United Kingdom) Sandy Mitchell	1:15.220	+7.316	17
19	GTD Pro	64	(United States) Ford Racing	(United Kingdom) Ben Barker	1:15.258	+7.354	18
20	GTD Pro	65	(United States) Ford Racing	(Belgium) Frédéric Vervisch	1:15.290	+7.386	19
21	GTD	36	(United States) DXDT Racing	(United States) Mason Filippi	1:15.373	+7.469	21
22	GTD	12	(United States) Vasser Sullivan Racing	(Denmark) Benjamin Pedersen	1:15.382	+7.478	22
23	GTD	57	(United States) Winward Racing	(United States) Russell Ward	1:15.399	+7.495	23
24	GTD	45	(United States) Wayne Taylor Racing	(Costa Rica) Danny Formal	1:15.656	+7.752	24
25	GTD	96	(United States) Turner Motorsport	(United States) Patrick Gallagher	1:15.728	+7.824	25
26	GTD	81	(United States) DragonSpeed	(United Kingdom) Casper Stevenson	1:15.783	+7.879	26
27	GTD	34	(United States) Conquest Racing	(Italy) Lorenzo Patrese	1:16.212	+8.308	27
28	GTD	66	(United States) Gradient Racing	(United States) Jake Walker	1:16.485	+8.581	28
29	GTD	120	(United States) Wright Motorsports	(United States) Adam Adelson	1:16.515	+8.611	29
30	GTD	70	(United Kingdom) Inception Racing	(United States) Brendan Iribe	1:16.805	+8.901	30
31	GTD	16	(United States) Myers Riley Motorsports	(United States) Sheena Monk	1:17.159	+9.255	31
32	GTD	13	(Canada) 13 Autosport	(Canada) Orey Fidani	1:17.638	+9.734	32

== Race ==
=== Race results ===
Class winners are denoted in bold and with ‡.

Pos	Class	No	Team	Drivers	Chassis	Laps	Time/Retired
Pos	Class	No	Team	Drivers	Engine	Laps	Time/Retired
1	**LMP2**	**43**	**(Poland) Inter Europol Competition**	**(United States) Jeremy Clarke** **(France) Tom Dillmann**	**Oreca 07**	**127**	**2:40:11.608‡**
1	**LMP2**	**43**	**(Poland) Inter Europol Competition**	**(United States) Jeremy Clarke** **(France) Tom Dillmann**	**Gibson GK428 4.2 L V8**	**127**	**2:40:11.608‡**
2	LMP2	04	(United States) CrowdStrike Racing by APR	(United States) George Kurtz (United Kingdom) Alex Quinn	Oreca 07	127	+9.796
2	LMP2	04	(United States) CrowdStrike Racing by APR	(United States) George Kurtz (United Kingdom) Alex Quinn	Gibson GK428 4.2 L V8	127	+9.796
3	LMP2	99	(United States) AO Racing	(United States) Dane Cameron (United States) P. J. Hyett	Oreca 07	127	+15.997
3	LMP2	99	(United States) AO Racing	(United States) Dane Cameron (United States) P. J. Hyett	Gibson GK428 4.2 L V8	127	+15.997
4	LMP2	52	(United States) Bryan Herta Autosport with PR1/Mathiasen	(Canada) Misha Goikhberg (United States) Ricky Taylor	Oreca 07	127	+36.118
4	LMP2	52	(United States) Bryan Herta Autosport with PR1/Mathiasen	(Canada) Misha Goikhberg (United States) Ricky Taylor	Gibson GK428 4.2 L V8	127	+36.118
5	LMP2	22	(United States) United Autosports USA	(United States) Dan Goldburg (United Kingdom) Ben Hanley	Oreca 07	127	+1:11.042
5	LMP2	22	(United States) United Autosports USA	(United States) Dan Goldburg (United Kingdom) Ben Hanley	Gibson GK428 4.2 L V8	127	+1:11.042
6	LMP2	73	(United States) Pratt Miller Motorsports	(Canada) Chris Cumming (Brazil) Pietro Fittipaldi	Oreca 07	126	+1 Lap
6	LMP2	73	(United States) Pratt Miller Motorsports	(Canada) Chris Cumming (Brazil) Pietro Fittipaldi	Gibson GK428 4.2 L V8	126	+1 Lap
7	**GTD Pro**	**14**	**(United States) Vasser Sullivan Racing**	**(United Kingdom) Ben Barnicoat** **(United Kingdom) Jack Hawksworth**	**Lexus RC F GT3**	**118**	**+9 Laps‡**
7	**GTD Pro**	**14**	**(United States) Vasser Sullivan Racing**	**(United Kingdom) Ben Barnicoat** **(United Kingdom) Jack Hawksworth**	**Toyota 2UR-GSE 5.4 L V8**	**118**	**+9 Laps‡**
8	GTD Pro	77	(United States) AO Racing	(United Kingdom) Harry King (United Kingdom) Nick Tandy	Porsche 911 GT3 R (992.2)	118	+9 Laps
8	GTD Pro	77	(United States) AO Racing	(United Kingdom) Harry King (United Kingdom) Nick Tandy	Porsche M97/80 4.2 L Flat-6	118	+9 Laps
9	GTD Pro	1	(United States) Paul Miller Racing	(United States) Connor De Phillippi (United States) Neil Verhagen	BMW M4 GT3 Evo	118	+9 Laps
9	GTD Pro	1	(United States) Paul Miller Racing	(United States) Connor De Phillippi (United States) Neil Verhagen	BMW P58 3.0 L Turbo I6	118	+9 Laps
10	GTD Pro	4	(United States) Corvette Racing by Pratt Miller Motorsports	(Netherlands) Nicky Catsburg (United States) Tommy Milner	Chevrolet Corvette Z06 GT3.R	118	+9 Laps
10	GTD Pro	4	(United States) Corvette Racing by Pratt Miller Motorsports	(Netherlands) Nicky Catsburg (United States) Tommy Milner	Chevrolet LT6.R 5.5 L V8	118	+9 Laps
11	GTD Pro	65	(United States) Ford Racing	(Germany) Christopher Mies (Belgium) Frédéric Vervisch	Ford Mustang GT3 Evo	118	+9 Laps
11	GTD Pro	65	(United States) Ford Racing	(Germany) Christopher Mies (Belgium) Frédéric Vervisch	Ford Coyote 5.4 L V8	118	+9 Laps
12	GTD Pro	59	(United States) RLL Team McLaren	(United States) Max Esterson (United States) Nikita Johnson	McLaren 720S GT3 Evo	118	+9 Laps
12	GTD Pro	59	(United States) RLL Team McLaren	(United States) Max Esterson (United States) Nikita Johnson	McLaren M840T 4.0 L Turbo V8	118	+9 Laps
13	GTD Pro	64	(United States) Ford Racing	(United Kingdom) Ben Barker (Norway) Dennis Olsen	Ford Mustang GT3 Evo	118	+9 Laps
13	GTD Pro	64	(United States) Ford Racing	(United Kingdom) Ben Barker (Norway) Dennis Olsen	Ford Coyote 5.4 L V8	118	+9 Laps
14	GTD Pro	9	(Canada) Pfaff Motorsports	(Italy) Andrea Caldarelli (United Kingdom) Sandy Mitchell	Lamborghini Temerario GT3	118	+9 Laps
14	GTD Pro	9	(Canada) Pfaff Motorsports	(Italy) Andrea Caldarelli (United Kingdom) Sandy Mitchell	Lamborghini L411 4.0 L Turbo V8	118	+9 Laps
15	GTD Pro	3	(United States) Corvette Racing by Pratt Miller Motorsports	(Spain) Antonio García (United Kingdom) Alexander Sims	Chevrolet Corvette Z06 GT3.R	118	+9 Laps
15	GTD Pro	3	(United States) Corvette Racing by Pratt Miller Motorsports	(Spain) Antonio García (United Kingdom) Alexander Sims	Chevrolet LT6.R 5.5 L V8	118	+9 Laps
16	**GTD**	**57**	**(United States) Winward Racing**	**(Switzerland) Philip Ellis** **(United States) Russell Ward**	**Mercedes-AMG GT3 Evo**	**118**	**+9 Laps‡**
16	**GTD**	**57**	**(United States) Winward Racing**	**(Switzerland) Philip Ellis** **(United States) Russell Ward**	**Mercedes-AMG M159 6.2 L V8**	**118**	**+9 Laps‡**
17	GTD	12	(United States) Vasser Sullivan Racing	(Denmark) Benjamin Pedersen (United States) Aaron Telitz	Lexus RC F GT3	118	+9 Laps
17	GTD	12	(United States) Vasser Sullivan Racing	(Denmark) Benjamin Pedersen (United States) Aaron Telitz	Toyota 2UR-GSE 5.4 L V8	118	+9 Laps
18	GTD	96	(United States) Turner Motorsport	(United States) Robby Foley (United States) Patrick Gallagher	BMW M4 GT3 Evo	118	+9 Laps
18	GTD	96	(United States) Turner Motorsport	(United States) Robby Foley (United States) Patrick Gallagher	BMW P58 3.0 L Turbo I6	118	+9 Laps
19	GTD	34	(United States) Conquest Racing	(Spain) Albert Costa (Italy) Lorenzo Patrese	Ferrari 296 GT3 Evo	118	+9 Laps
19	GTD	34	(United States) Conquest Racing	(Spain) Albert Costa (Italy) Lorenzo Patrese	Ferrari F163CE 3.0 L Turbo V6	118	+9 Laps
20	GTD	45	(United States) Wayne Taylor Racing	(Costa Rica) Danny Formal (United States) Trent Hindman	Lamborghini Huracán GT3 Evo 2	118	+9 Laps
20	GTD	45	(United States) Wayne Taylor Racing	(Costa Rica) Danny Formal (United States) Trent Hindman	Lamborghini DGF 5.2 L V10	118	+9 Laps
21	GTD	27	(United States) Heart of Racing Team	(Brazil) Eduardo Barrichello (Canada) Roman De Angelis	Aston Martin Vantage AMR GT3 Evo	118	+9 Laps
21	GTD	27	(United States) Heart of Racing Team	(Brazil) Eduardo Barrichello (Canada) Roman De Angelis	Aston Martin AMR16A 4.0 L Turbo V8	118	+9 Laps
22	GTD	70	(United Kingdom) Inception Racing	(United States) Brendan Iribe (Denmark) Frederik Schandorff	Ferrari 296 GT3 Evo	118	+9 Laps
22	GTD	70	(United Kingdom) Inception Racing	(United States) Brendan Iribe (Denmark) Frederik Schandorff	Ferrari F163CE 3.0 L Turbo V6	118	+9 Laps
23	GTD	16	(United States) Myers Riley Motorsports	(Brazil) Felipe Fraga (United States) Sheena Monk	Ford Mustang GT3 Evo	118	+9 Laps
23	GTD	16	(United States) Myers Riley Motorsports	(Brazil) Felipe Fraga (United States) Sheena Monk	Ford Coyote 5.4 L V8	118	+9 Laps
24	GTD	120	(United States) Wright Motorsports	(United States) Adam Adelson (United Kingdom) Callum Ilott	Porsche 911 GT3 R (992.2)	118	+9 Laps
24	GTD	120	(United States) Wright Motorsports	(United States) Adam Adelson (United Kingdom) Callum Ilott	Porsche M97/80 4.2 L Flat-6	118	+9 Laps
25	GTD	81	(United States) DragonSpeed	(Italy) Giacomo Altoè (United Kingdom) Casper Stevenson	Chevrolet Corvette Z06 GT3.R	118	+9 Laps
25	GTD	81	(United States) DragonSpeed	(Italy) Giacomo Altoè (United Kingdom) Casper Stevenson	Chevrolet LT6.R 5.5 L V8	118	+9 Laps
26	GTD Pro	68	(United States) Car Blanche	(Australia) Scott Andrews (France) Valentin Hasse-Clot	Aston Martin Vantage AMR GT3 Evo	118	+9 Laps
26	GTD Pro	68	(United States) Car Blanche	(Australia) Scott Andrews (France) Valentin Hasse-Clot	Aston Martin AMR16A 4.0 L Turbo V8	118	+9 Laps
27	GTD	66	(United States) Gradient Racing	(United States) Corey Lewis (United States) Jake Walker	Ford Mustang GT3 Evo	117	+10 Laps
27	GTD	66	(United States) Gradient Racing	(United States) Corey Lewis (United States) Jake Walker	Ford Coyote 5.4 L V8	117	+10 Laps
28	GTD	13	(Canada) 13 Autosport	(United Kingdom) Matt Bell (Canada) Orey Fidani	Chevrolet Corvette Z06 GT3.R	117	+10 Laps
28	GTD	13	(Canada) 13 Autosport	(United Kingdom) Matt Bell (Canada) Orey Fidani	Chevrolet LT6.R 5.5 L V8	117	+10 Laps
29	LMP2	2	(United States) United Autosports USA	(Canada) Phil Fayer (Denmark) Mikkel Jensen	Oreca 07	117	+10 Laps
29	LMP2	2	(United States) United Autosports USA	(Canada) Phil Fayer (Denmark) Mikkel Jensen	Gibson GK428 4.2 L V8	117	+10 Laps
30	LMP2	8	(Canada) Tower Motorsports	(Mexico) Sebastián Álvarez (Canada) John Farano	Oreca 07	117	+10 Laps
30	LMP2	8	(Canada) Tower Motorsports	(Mexico) Sebastián Álvarez (Canada) John Farano	Gibson GK428 4.2 L V8	117	+10 Laps
31	GTD	36	(United States) DXDT Racing	(United States) Mason Filippi (Canada) Robert Wickens	Chevrolet Corvette Z06 GT3.R	115	+12 Laps
31	GTD	36	(United States) DXDT Racing	(United States) Mason Filippi (Canada) Robert Wickens	Chevrolet LT6.R 5.5 L V8	115	+12 Laps
32	LMP2	11	(France) TDS Racing	(Switzerland) Mathias Beche (Canada) Tobias Lütke	Oreca 07	78	+49 Laps
32	LMP2	11	(France) TDS Racing	(Switzerland) Mathias Beche (Canada) Tobias Lütke	Gibson GK428 4.2 L V8	78	+49 Laps

IMSA SportsCar Championship
Previous race: Sahlen's Six Hours of The Glen	2026 season	Next race: SportsCar Grand Prix
