= IMSA Battle on the Bricks =

Sports car endurance race held in Speedway, Indiana, US

IMSA WeatherTech SportsCar Championship
- Venue: Indianapolis Motor Speedway
- Corporate sponsor: Tirerack.com
- First race: 2012
- First IMSA race: 2023
- Duration: 2 hours 40 minutes
- Previous names: Brickyard Grand Prix (2012–2014)
- Most wins (driver): (Venezuela) Alex Popow (2)
- Most wins (team): (United States) Starworks Motorsport (United States) Action Express Racing (2)
- Most wins (manufacturer): (United States) Riley (Germany) BMW (2)

The Tirerack.com Battle on the Bricks is an IMSA WeatherTech SportsCar Championship event held on the combined road course at Indianapolis Motor Speedway in Speedway, Indiana.

== History ==
The original version of the race, held from 2012 to 2014, was a support race for the Brickyard 400, as part of "Kroger Super Weekend at the Brickyard". In its first two years, it was held as part of the Grand Am Rolex Sports Car Series, and moved to the United SportsCar Championship in 2014. The race went on hiatus after 2014.

The race was revived in 2023, as part of the WeatherTech SportsCar Championship. It is now held as a stand-alone event held in September. For 2023, the race was a two hours, 40 minute length. For 2024, the race expanded to that of being an endurance race and is one of the major endurance races on the IMSA schedule, joining Daytona, Sebring, Watkins Glen, and Petit Le Mans. The race stayed as a six hour race in 2025, but is set to revert to being a two hours, 40 minute race in 2026 and will be replaced as a six hour Endurance Cup race by the IMSA SportsCar Weekend at Road America.

== Race winners ==
Year	Date	Scheduled duration	Class	Overall winner(s)	Entrant	Car	Elapsed distance		Report	Ref
Year	Date	Scheduled duration	Class	Overall winner(s)	Entrant	Car	Time	Laps	Report	Ref
Rolex Sports Car Series
2012	July 27	3 hours	Daytona Prototype	(France) Sébastien Bourdais (Venezuela) Alex Popow	(United States) Starworks Motorsport	Riley Ford	3:00:55.304	91	Report	
2013	July 26	3 hours	Daytona Prototype	(United Kingdom) Ryan Dalziel (Venezuela) Alex Popow	(United States) Starworks Motorsport	Riley BMW	3:00:28.287	107	Report	
IMSA Weathertech Sports Car Series
2014	July 25	2 hours 45 minutes	Prototype	(Brazil) Christian Fittipaldi (Portugal) João Barbosa	(United States) Action Express Racing	Chevrolet Corvette DP	2:46:02.720	218	Report	
2015 – 2022	Not Held									
2023	September 17	2 hours 40 minutes	GTP	(France) Mathieu Jaminet (United Kingdom) Nick Tandy	(Germany) Porsche Penske Motorsport	Porsche 963	2:41:00.878	113	Report	
2024	September 22	6 hours	GTP	(Austria) Philipp Eng (Finland) Jesse Krohn	(United States) BMW M Team RLL	BMW M Hybrid V8	6:00:54.050	219	Report	
2025	September 21	6 hours	GTP	(United Kingdom) Jack Aitken (New Zealand) Earl Bamber (Denmark) Frederik Vesti	(United States) Cadillac Whelen	Cadillac V-Series.R	6:00:41.285	243	Report	
2026	September 20	2 hours 40 minutes	GTP	(South Africa) Sheldon van der Linde (Belgium) Dries Vanthoor	(Belgium) BMW M Team WRT	BMW M Hybrid V8		112	Report	

=== Support races ===
The Brickyard Sports Car Challenge is a sports car race in the IMSA Michelin Pilot Challenge series (formerly the Continental Tire Sports Car Challenge), with two classes being run concurrently. It was held as support to the Brickyard Grand Prix, which was in turn a support race to the Brickyard 400. The 2023 revival will be one of IMSA's major races, as a four-hour race.

Year	Date	Scheduled duration	Class	Winning drivers	Car	Elapsed distance	
Year	Date	Scheduled duration	Class	Winning drivers	Car	Miles	Laps
Continental Tire Sports Car Challenge
2012	July 27	2.5 hours	Grand Sport	(United States) Lawson Aschenbach (United States) Eric Curran	Chevrolet Camaro	149.5	59
2012	July 27	2.5 hours	Street Tuner	(United States) Daniel Rogers (United States) Seth Thomas	BMW 328i	147.0	58
2013	July 26	2.5 hours	Grand Sport	(United States) Mark Boden (United States) Bryan Sellers	BMW M3	187.5	74
2013	July 26	2.5 hours	Street Tuner	(United States) Terry Borcheller (United States) Mike LaMarra	BMW 128i	185.0	73
2014	July 25	2.5 hours	Grand Sport	(United Kingdom) Robin Liddell (United States) Andrew Davis	Chevrolet Camaro	209.8	86
2014	July 25	2.5 hours	Street Tuner	(United States) Cody Ellsworth (United States) Corey Lewis	Porsche Cayman	204.9	84
Michelin Pilot Challenge
2023	September 16	4 hours	Grand Sport	(Canada) Daniel Morad (United States) Bryce Ward	Mercedes-AMG GT4	268.3	110
2023	September 16	4 hours	Touring Car	(United States) Chris Miller (South Africa) Mikey Taylor	Audi RS 3 LMS TCR (2021)	236.8	110
2024	September 21	2 hours	Grand Sport	(United States) Sean McAlister (United States) Jeff Westphal	BMW M4 GT4 Gen II	173.1	71
2024	September 21	2 hours	Touring Car	(United States) Mason Filippi (Canada) Mark Wilkins	Hyundai Elantra N TCR	173.1	71
2025	September 20	2 hours	Grand Sport	(United States) Michael Cooper; Moisey Uretsky	McLaren Artura GT4	173.1	71
2025	September 20	2 hours	Touring Car	(United States) Tyler Gonzalez (United States) Eric Powell	Cupra León VZ TCR	173.1	71
2026	September 20	2 hours	Grand Sport	(United States) Michael Cooper (United States) Moisey Uretsky	McLaren Artura GT4	173.1	71
2026	September 20	2 hours	Touring Car	(United States) Steven Clemons (Spain) Tyler Gonzalez	Cupra León VZ TCR	173.1	71
