= Grand Touring Prototype =

Grand Touring Prototype may be:

- GTP, the 1980s sports prototype class under IMSA GT Championship
- GTP, the 2020s sports prototype class under IMSA SportsCar Championship, using LMDh and Le Mans Hypercar cars

== See also ==
- IMSA GTP, used in the IMSA GT Championship
- Le Mans Prototype, GTP-style cars
- Daytona Prototype, 2010s GTP replacements
- Group C, 1980s FIA equivalents to the IMSA ones
