= 2023 IMSA SportsCar Championship =

53rd season of the racing series organized by IMSA

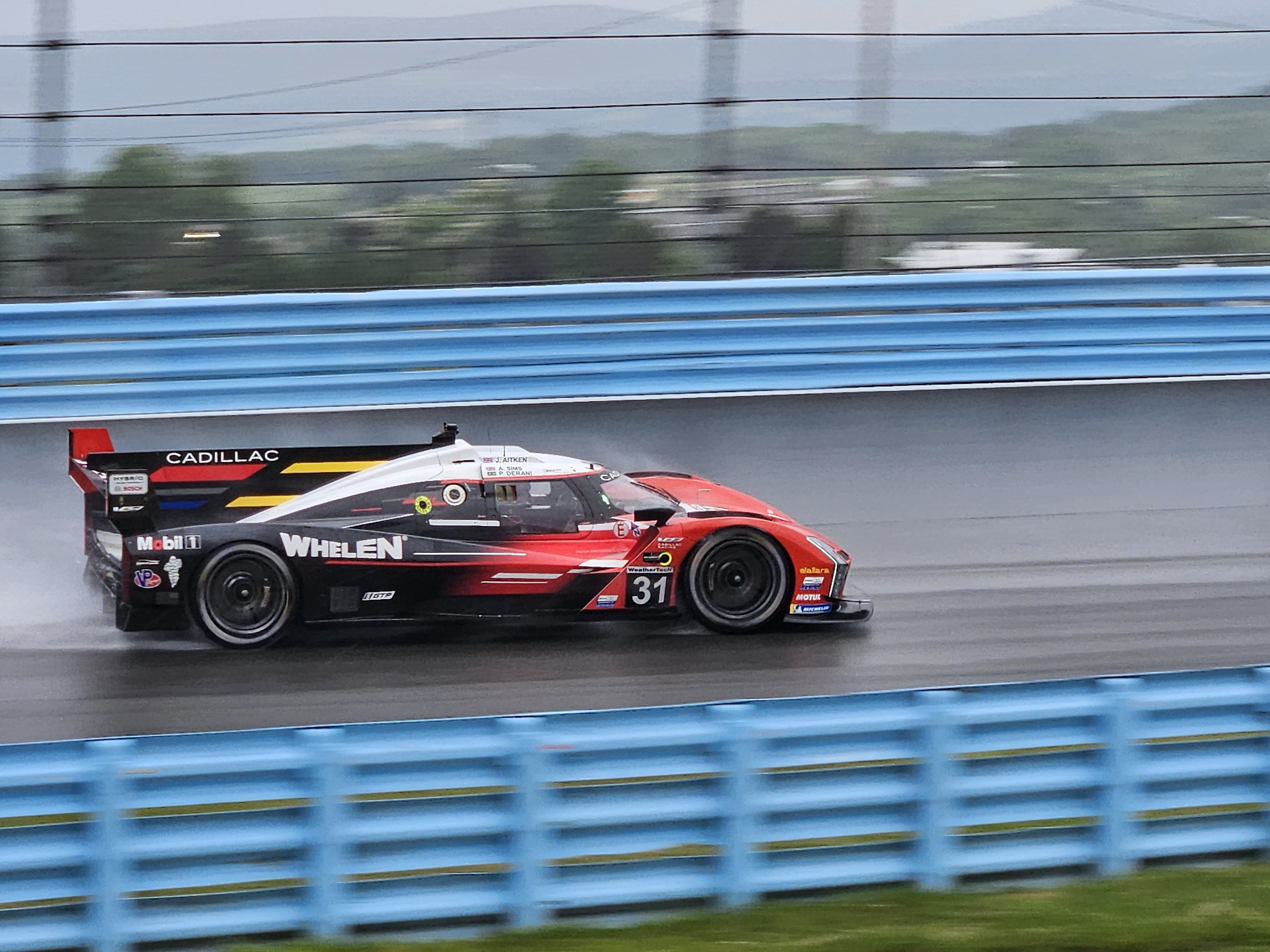
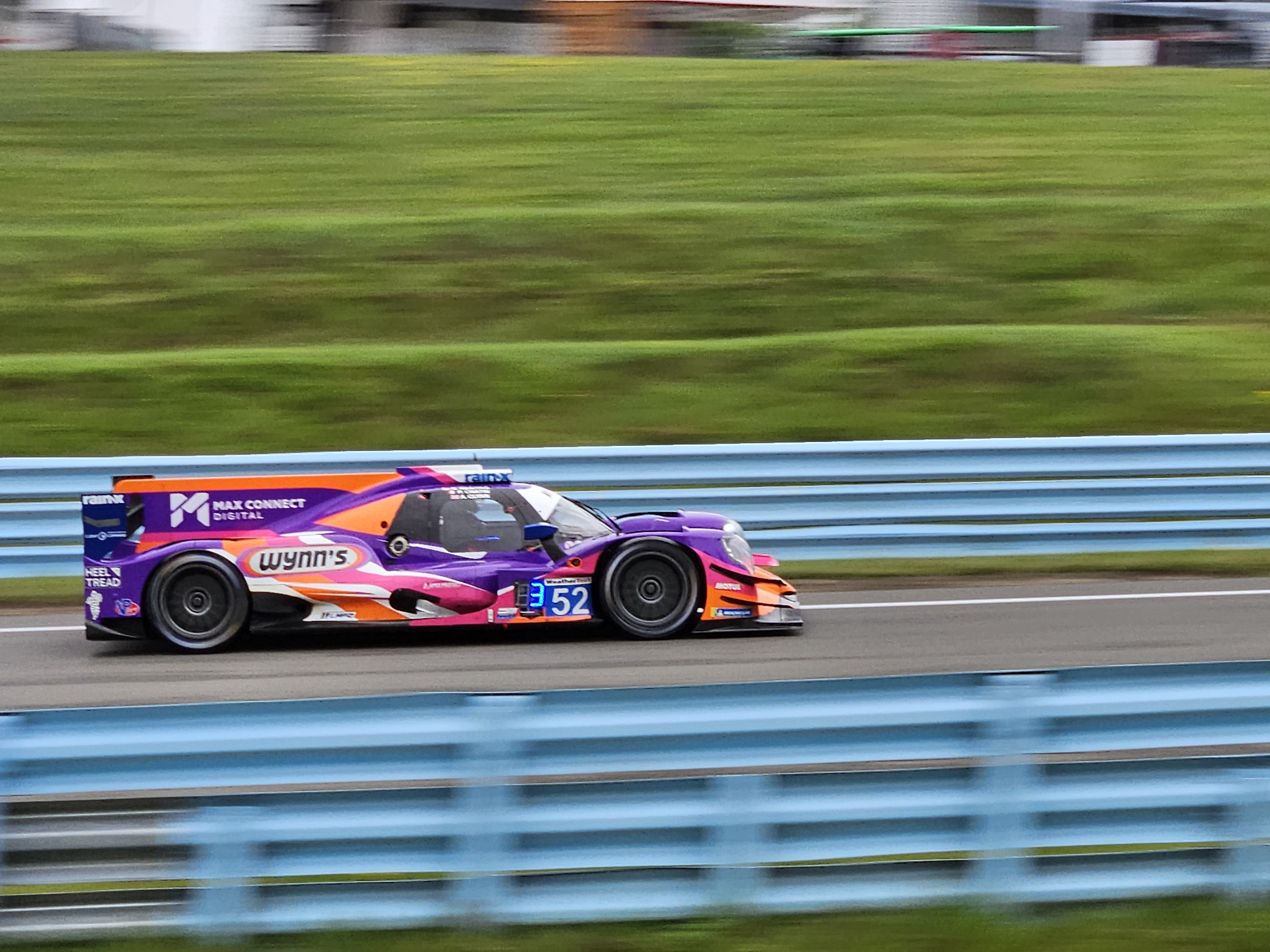
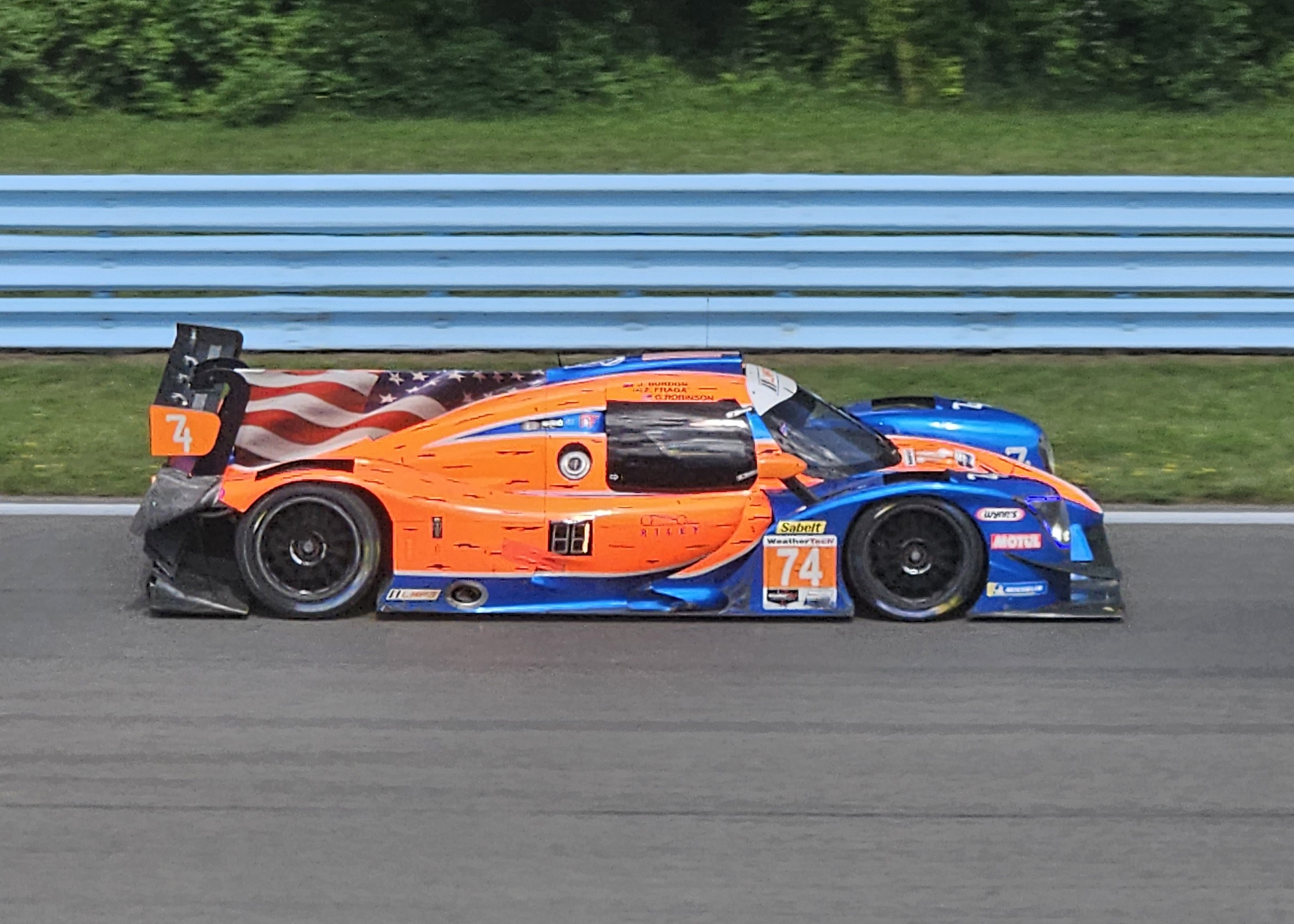
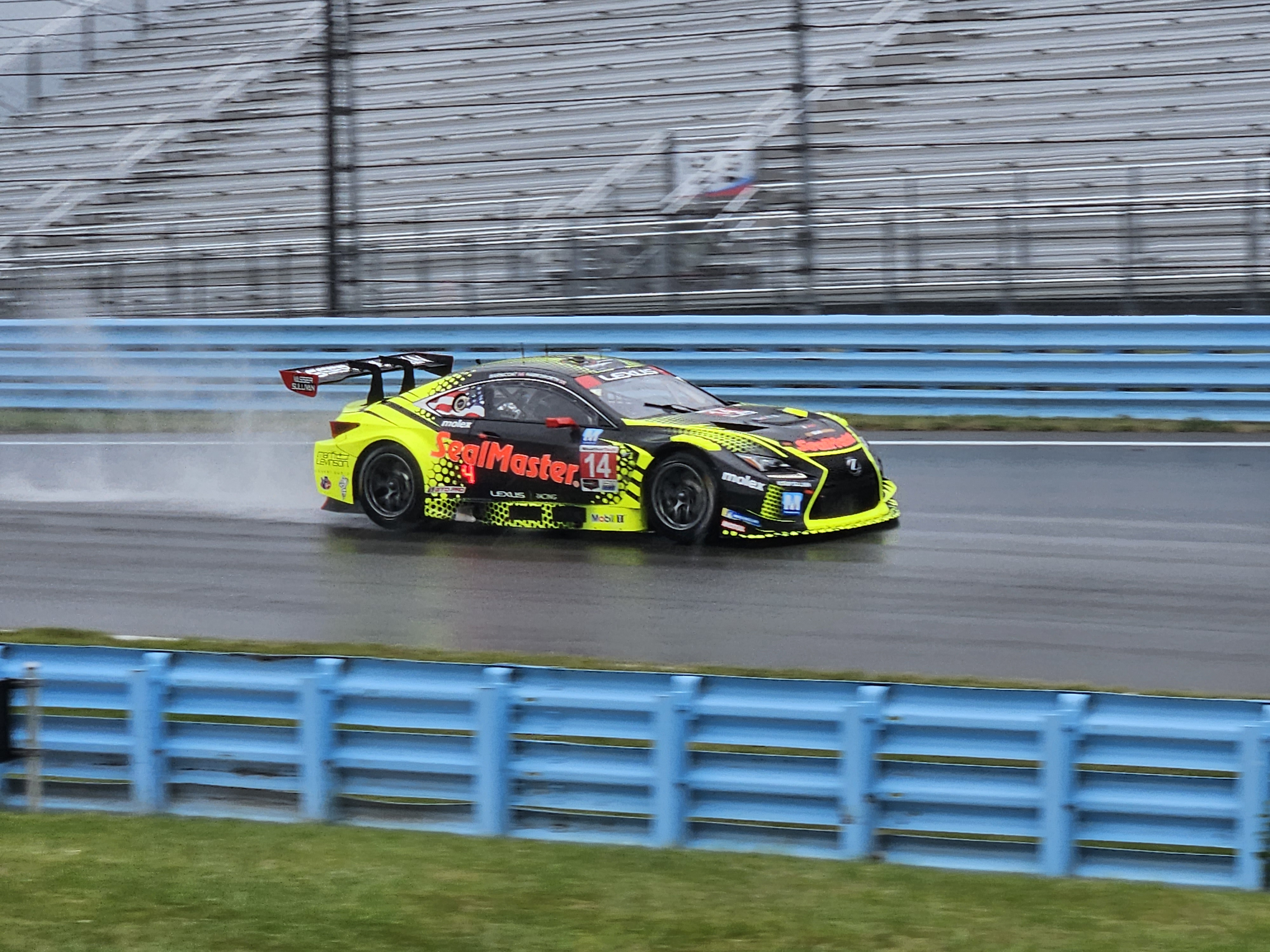
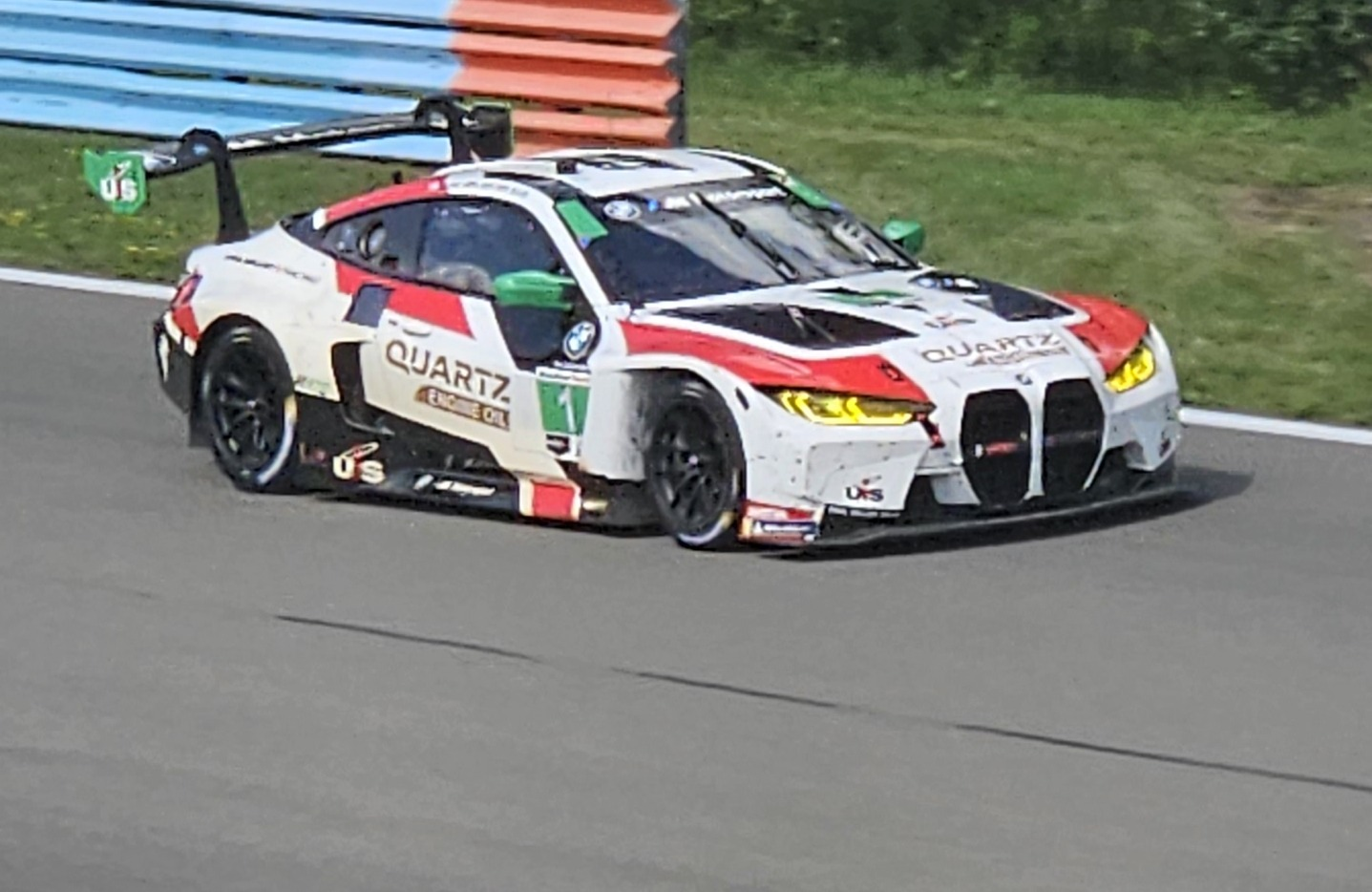
The Cadillac No. 31 drivers of Action Express Racing are the winners of the Grand Touring Prototype' Championship, with Cadillac winning the manufactures' championship. The Oreca No. 52 drivers of PR1/Mathiasen Motorsports are the winners of the Le Mans Prototype 2 championship. The no. 74 Ligier of Riley Motosports won the final Le Mans Prototype 3 championship. The No. 14 of Vasser Sullivan Lexus won the GT Daytona Pro championship, with Lexus the GTD Pro manu championship. The No. 1 Paul Miller Racing BMW won the GT Daytona championship, with BMW winning the manufactures' championship in that class.

The 2023 IMSA SportsCar Championship (known for sponsorship reasons as the 2023 IMSA WeatherTech SportsCar Championship) was the 53rd racing season sanctioned by the International Motor Sports Association, which traces its lineage back to the 1971 IMSA GT Championship. It was also the tenth season of the IMSA SportsCar Championship since the merger between the American Le Mans Series and the Rolex Sports Car Series in 2014, and the eighth under the sponsorship of WeatherTech. The 2023 season marked an overhaul season for the championship, with a change in class structure and a new race on the season calendar at Indianapolis Motor Speedway. The championship began with the 24 Hours of Daytona on January 28 and concluded with the Petit Le Mans on October 14 after 11 races.

== Classes ==
- Grand Touring Prototype (GTP) (LMDh and LMH)
- Le Mans Prototype 2 (LMP2)
- Le Mans Prototype 3 (LMP3)
- GT Daytona Pro (GTD Pro)
- GT Daytona (GTD)

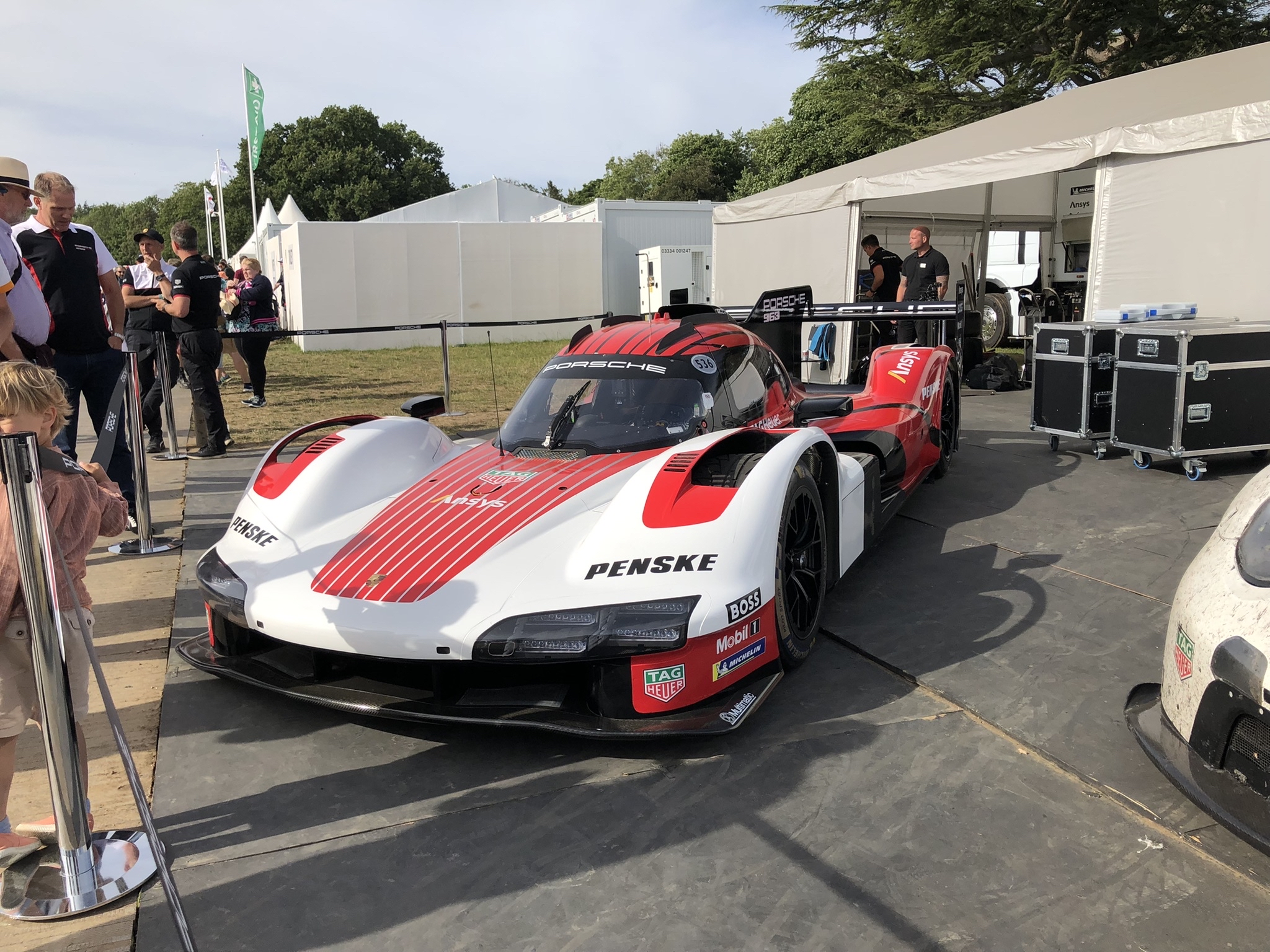
The Porsche 963 (pictured at the 2022 Goodwood Festival of Speed) is one of the prototype race cars that are allowed to compete under IMSA's new GTP class. It complies with the LMDh regulations.

At the end of the 2022 season, IMSA retired the Daytona Prototype international (DPi) class, which was the premier racing class in the WeatherTech Championship from 2017 until 2022, spanning six seasons. IMSA replaced it with a new class called GTP, named in tribute to the GTP class from the IMSA GT Championship in the 1980s.

GTP is the new flagship class of the championship and consists of two sister technical regulations: Le Mans Daytona h (LMDh), and Le Mans Hypercar (LMH). LMDh allows choosing from a base chassis, of which there are four choices, from Dallara, Ligier, Multimatic, and Oreca, as well as a specification hybrid system on all cars, with freedom on aerodynamics, bodywork, and engine configuration. The LMH regulation allows bespoke hybrid designs and offers more mechanical design freedom in exchange for elevated development costs. As with the DPi class, GTP is regulated by a Balance of Performance (BoP) system to keep the performance range of each of the cars close together and regulate spending.

The GTP class consists of the same framework as the Hypercar class of the FIA World Endurance Championship. A collaborative alliance between IMSA and the French racing organizers, ACO, resulted in the convergence of the two organizers' top-class regulations.

After initially announcing discontinuing the sub-championship entirely on August 5, IMSA later declared on September 1 that they would continue the WeatherTech Sprint Cup, a championship comprising only sprint rounds for the GT Daytona (GTD) class. The only difference was that there would be no Sprint Cup-only rounds for 2023, to combat situations such as the record-low six-car GTD entry at the 2022 Chevrolet Grand Prix.

== Schedule ==
The provisional schedule was released on August 5, 2022, and featured 11 rounds.

Race is part of the Michelin Endurance Cup
Race is part of the WeatherTech Sprint Cup

| Rnd. | Race | Length | Classes | Circuit | Location | Date |
|---|---|---|---|---|---|---|
| 1 | Rolex 24 at Daytona | 24 hours | All (Note: The LMP2 and LMP3 class only scored points towards the Michelin Endurance Cup.) | Daytona International Speedway | Daytona Beach, Florida | January 28–29 |
| 2 | Mobil 1 Twelve Hours of Sebring | 12 hours | All | Sebring International Raceway | Sebring, Florida | March 18 |
| 3 | Acura Grand Prix of Long Beach | 1 hour, 40 minutes | GTP, GTD Pro, GTD | Long Beach Street Circuit | Long Beach, California | April 15 |
| 4 | Motul Course de Monterey | 2 hours, 40 minutes | GTP, LMP2, GTD Pro, GTD | WeatherTech Raceway Laguna Seca | Monterey, California | May 14 |
| 5 | Sahlen's Six Hours of The Glen | 6 hours | All | Watkins Glen International | Watkins Glen, New York | June 25 |
| 6 | Chevrolet Grand Prix | 2 hours, 40 minutes | GTP, LMP3, GTD Pro, GTD | Canadian Tire Motorsport Park | Bowmanville, Ontario | July 9 |
| 7 | FCP Euro Northeast Grand Prix | 2 hours, 40 minutes | GTD Pro, GTD | Lime Rock Park | Lakeville, Connecticut | July 22 |
| 8 | IMSA SportsCar Weekend | 2 hours, 40 minutes | All | Road America | Elkhart Lake, Wisconsin | August 6 |
| 9 | Michelin GT Challenge at VIR | 2 hours, 40 minutes | GTD Pro, GTD | Virginia International Raceway | Alton, Virginia | August 27 |
| 10 | IMSA Battle on the Bricks | 2 hours, 40 minutes | All | Indianapolis Motor Speedway | Speedway, Indiana | September 17 |
| 11 | Motul Petit Le Mans | 10 hours | All | Michelin Raceway Road Atlanta | Braselton, Georgia | October 14 |

=== Calendar changes ===
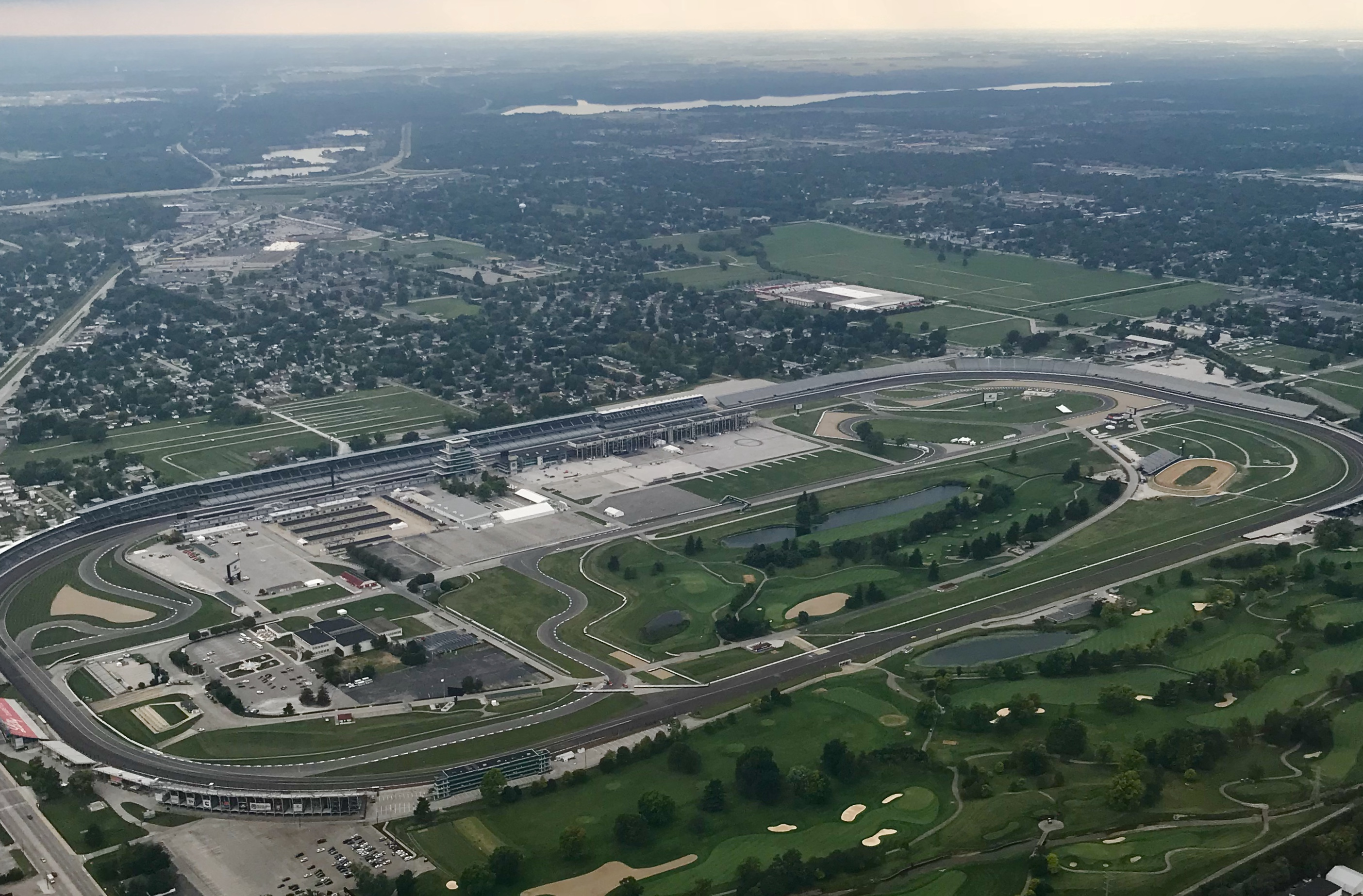
Indianapolis Motor Speedway returned to the championship's schedule for the first time since 2014.

- Mid-Ohio Sports Car Course was dropped from the calendar. The track had been a part of the championship since 2018. The event was replaced with a sprint race at Indianapolis Motor Speedway, marking IMS' return to the championship for the first time since the series' inaugural season in 2014.
- It was also originally supposed to have Chicago Street Course in the 2023 schedule, but it got canceled. So Road America went back to the schedule.The Raceway on Belle Isle was also dropped from the calendar as a result of the Belle Isle circuit being replaced in favor of the Detroit street circuit. The track was a part of the championship for every season of the IMSA SportsCar Championship since its inception in 2014, except for 2020 due to the COVID-19 pandemic.
- On December 1, 2022, it was announced that the Rolex 24 Qualifying Race had been canceled for 2023, with the race reverting to a traditional qualifying format. Qualifying will take place on January 22, the final day of the "Roar Before the Rolex 24" preseason test.

== Rule changes ==
- In response to the 2022 Six Hours of The Glen which saw several cars penalized for drive-time infringements as a result of a red flag for inclement weather, IMSA will now reduce the required drive time by a ratio of 2:1 corresponding to a percentage of the race time lost, rather than 1:1 as had been the rule previously. For example: If a race is shortened by 10 percent due to a red flag condition, each driver's minimum required drive time would be reduced by 20 percent.
- The minimum sprint race drive time for bronze-categorized drivers in the GTD Class has been reduced from 45 minutes to 35 minutes.
- As an incentive for bronze-categorized drivers to participate in qualifying in the GTD Class, teams whose qualifying time is set by a bronze-categorized driver will be permitted to change tires for the start of the race, while teams utilizing drivers of any other categorization must start the race on the tires used in qualifying.
- For drivers competing in more than one car during a race, the cumulative maximum drive time no longer applies to races under 6 hours in length.

== Entries ==
=== Grand Touring Prototype (GTP) ===
| Team | Chassis | Engine | No. | Drivers | Rounds |
|---|---|---|---|---|---|
| (United States) Cadillac Racing | Cadillac V-LMDh1; Cadillac V-Series.R 8 | Cadillac LMC55R 5.5 L V8 | 01 | (France) Sébastien Bourdais | All |
| (United States) Cadillac Racing | Cadillac V-LMDh1; Cadillac V-Series.R 8 | Cadillac LMC55R 5.5 L V8 | 01 | (Netherlands) Renger van der Zande | All |
| (United States) Cadillac Racing | Cadillac V-LMDh1; Cadillac V-Series.R 8 | Cadillac LMC55R 5.5 L V8 | 01 | (New Zealand) Scott Dixon | 1–2, 11 |
| (United States) Cadillac Racing | Cadillac V-LMDh1; Cadillac V-Series.R 8 | Cadillac LMC55R 5.5 L V8 | 02 | (New Zealand) Earl Bamber | 1 |
| (United States) Cadillac Racing | Cadillac V-LMDh1; Cadillac V-Series.R 8 | Cadillac LMC55R 5.5 L V8 | 02 | (United Kingdom) Alex Lynn | 1 |
| (United States) Cadillac Racing | Cadillac V-LMDh1; Cadillac V-Series.R 8 | Cadillac LMC55R 5.5 L V8 | 02 | (United Kingdom) Richard Westbrook | 1 |
| (United States) JDC–Miller MotorSports | Porsche 963 | Porsche 9RD 4.6 L Turbo V8 | 5 | (Netherlands) Tijmen van der Helm | 4–6, 8, 10–11 |
| (United States) JDC–Miller MotorSports | Porsche 963 | Porsche 9RD 4.6 L Turbo V8 | 5 | (Germany) Mike Rockenfeller | 4–6, 8, 10–11 |
| (United States) JDC–Miller MotorSports | Porsche 963 | Porsche 9RD 4.6 L Turbo V8 | 5 | (United Kingdom) Jenson Button | 11 |
| (Germany) Porsche Penske Motorsport | Porsche 963 | Porsche 9RD 4.6 L Turbo V8 | 6 | (France) Mathieu Jaminet | All |
| (Germany) Porsche Penske Motorsport | Porsche 963 | Porsche 9RD 4.6 L Turbo V8 | 6 | (United Kingdom) Nick Tandy | All |
| (Germany) Porsche Penske Motorsport | Porsche 963 | Porsche 9RD 4.6 L Turbo V8 | 6 | (United States) Dane Cameron | 1–2 |
| (Germany) Porsche Penske Motorsport | Porsche 963 | Porsche 9RD 4.6 L Turbo V8 | 6 | (Belgium) Laurens Vanthoor | 11 |
| (Germany) Porsche Penske Motorsport | Porsche 963 | Porsche 9RD 4.6 L Turbo V8 | 7 | (Australia) Matt Campbell | All |
| (Germany) Porsche Penske Motorsport | Porsche 963 | Porsche 9RD 4.6 L Turbo V8 | 7 | (Brazil) Felipe Nasr | All |
| (Germany) Porsche Penske Motorsport | Porsche 963 | Porsche 9RD 4.6 L Turbo V8 | 7 | (Denmark) Michael Christensen | 1–2 |
| (Germany) Porsche Penske Motorsport | Porsche 963 | Porsche 9RD 4.6 L Turbo V8 | 7 | (United States) Josef Newgarden | 11 |
| (United States) Wayne Taylor Racing with Andretti Autosport | Acura ARX-06 | Acura AR24e 2.4 L Turbo V6 | 10 | (Portugal) Filipe Albuquerque | All |
| (United States) Wayne Taylor Racing with Andretti Autosport | Acura ARX-06 | Acura AR24e 2.4 L Turbo V6 | 10 | (United States) Ricky Taylor | All |
| (United States) Wayne Taylor Racing with Andretti Autosport | Acura ARX-06 | Acura AR24e 2.4 L Turbo V6 | 10 | (Switzerland) Louis Delétraz | 1–2, 5, 11 |
| (United States) Wayne Taylor Racing with Andretti Autosport | Acura ARX-06 | Acura AR24e 2.4 L Turbo V6 | 10 | (New Zealand) Brendon Hartley | 1 |
| (United States) BMW M Team RLL | BMW M Hybrid V8 | BMW P66/3 4.0 L Turbo V8 | 24 | (Austria) Philipp Eng | All |
| (United States) BMW M Team RLL | BMW M Hybrid V8 | BMW P66/3 4.0 L Turbo V8 | 24 | (Brazil) Augusto Farfus | All |
| (United States) BMW M Team RLL | BMW M Hybrid V8 | BMW P66/3 4.0 L Turbo V8 | 24 | (Germany) Marco Wittmann | 1–2, 11 |
| (United States) BMW M Team RLL | BMW M Hybrid V8 | BMW P66/3 4.0 L Turbo V8 | 24 | (United States) Colton Herta | 1 |
| (United States) BMW M Team RLL | BMW M Hybrid V8 | BMW P66/3 4.0 L Turbo V8 | 25 | (United States) Connor De Phillippi | All |
| (United States) BMW M Team RLL | BMW M Hybrid V8 | BMW P66/3 4.0 L Turbo V8 | 25 | (United Kingdom) Nick Yelloly | All |
| (United States) BMW M Team RLL | BMW M Hybrid V8 | BMW P66/3 4.0 L Turbo V8 | 25 | (South Africa) Sheldon van der Linde | 1–2, 11 |
| (United States) BMW M Team RLL | BMW M Hybrid V8 | BMW P66/3 4.0 L Turbo V8 | 25 | (United States) Colton Herta | 1 |
| (United States) Whelen Engineering Racing | Cadillac V-LMDh 1 Cadillac V-Series.R 8 | Cadillac LMC55R 5.5 L V8 | 31 | (Brazil) Pipo Derani | All |
| (United States) Whelen Engineering Racing | Cadillac V-LMDh 1 Cadillac V-Series.R 8 | Cadillac LMC55R 5.5 L V8 | 31 | (United Kingdom) Alexander Sims | All |
| (United States) Whelen Engineering Racing | Cadillac V-LMDh 1 Cadillac V-Series.R 8 | Cadillac LMC55R 5.5 L V8 | 31 | (United Kingdom) Jack Aitken | 1–2, 5, 11 |
| (Germany) Proton Competition | Porsche 963 | Porsche 9RD 4.6 L Turbo V8 | 59 | (Italy) Gianmaria Bruni | 8, 10–11 |
| (Germany) Proton Competition | Porsche 963 | Porsche 9RD 4.6 L Turbo V8 | 59 | (United Kingdom) Harry Tincknell | 8, 10–11 |
| (Germany) Proton Competition | Porsche 963 | Porsche 9RD 4.6 L Turbo V8 | 59 | (Switzerland) Neel Jani | 11 |
| (United States) Meyer Shank Racing with Curb-Agajanian | Acura ARX-06 | Acura AR24e 2.4 L Turbo V6 | 60 | (United Kingdom) Tom Blomqvist | All |
| (United States) Meyer Shank Racing with Curb-Agajanian | Acura ARX-06 | Acura AR24e 2.4 L Turbo V6 | 60 | (United States) Colin Braun | All |
| (United States) Meyer Shank Racing with Curb-Agajanian | Acura ARX-06 | Acura AR24e 2.4 L Turbo V6 | 60 | (Brazil) Hélio Castroneves | 1–2, 11 |
| (United States) Meyer Shank Racing with Curb-Agajanian | Acura ARX-06 | Acura AR24e 2.4 L Turbo V6 | 60 | (France) Simon Pagenaud | 1 |

=== Le Mans Prototype 2 (LMP2) ===
In accordance with the 2017 LMP2 regulations, all cars in the LMP2 class use the Gibson GK428 V8 engine.

| Team | Chassis | No. | Drivers | Rounds |
|---|---|---|---|---|
| (United States) CrowdStrike Racing by APR | Oreca 07 | 04 | (United Kingdom) Ben Hanley | All |
| (United States) CrowdStrike Racing by APR | Oreca 07 | 04 | (United States) George Kurtz | All |
| (United States) CrowdStrike Racing by APR | Oreca 07 | 04 | (United States) Nolan Siegel | 2, 5, 11 |
| (United States) CrowdStrike Racing by APR | Oreca 07 | 04 | (Mexico) Esteban Gutiérrez | 1 |
| (United States) CrowdStrike Racing by APR | Oreca 07 | 04 | (United States) Matt McMurry | 1 |
| (Canada) Tower Motorsports | Oreca 07 | 8 | (Barbados) Kyffin Simpson | 1–2, 5, 11 |
| (Canada) Tower Motorsports | Oreca 07 | 8 | (Canada) John Farano | 1–2, 4 |
| (Canada) Tower Motorsports | Oreca 07 | 8 | (New Zealand) Scott McLaughlin | 1–2, 11 |
| (Canada) Tower Motorsports | Oreca 07 | 8 | (Switzerland) Louis Delétraz | 4, 8, 10 |
| (Canada) Tower Motorsports | Oreca 07 | 8 | (United States) Josef Newgarden | 1 |
| (Canada) Tower Motorsports | Oreca 07 | 8 | (United Kingdom) Will Stevens | 5 |
| (Canada) Tower Motorsports | Oreca 07 | 8 | (Turkey) Salih Yoluç | 5 |
| (Canada) Tower Motorsports | Oreca 07 | 8 | (United States) Rodrigo Sales | 8 |
| (Canada) Tower Motorsports | Oreca 07 | 8 | (United States) Dan Goldburg | 10 |
| (Canada) Tower Motorsports | Oreca 07 | 8 | (United States) Ari Balogh | 11 |
| (France) TDS Racing | Oreca 07 | 11 | (Denmark) Mikkel Jensen | All |
| (France) TDS Racing | Oreca 07 | 11 | (United States) Steven Thomas | All |
| (France) TDS Racing | Oreca 07 | 11 | (United States) Scott Huffaker | 1–2, 5, 11 |
| (France) TDS Racing | Oreca 07 | 11 | (Netherlands) Rinus VeeKay | 1 |
| (France) TDS Racing | Oreca 07 | 35 | (Netherlands) Giedo van der Garde | All |
| (France) TDS Racing | Oreca 07 | 35 | (United States) Josh Pierson | 1–2, 5, 11 |
| (France) TDS Racing | Oreca 07 | 35 | (France) François Hériau | 1–2, 4 |
| (France) TDS Racing | Oreca 07 | 35 | (United States) John Falb | 5, 8, 11 |
| (France) TDS Racing | Oreca 07 | 35 | (Netherlands) Job van Uitert | 1 |
| (France) TDS Racing | Oreca 07 | 35 | (United States) Rodrigo Sales | 10 |
| (United States) Era Motorsport | Oreca 07 | 18 | (United Kingdom) Ryan Dalziel | All |
| (United States) Era Motorsport | Oreca 07 | 18 | (United States) Dwight Merriman | All |
| (United States) Era Motorsport | Oreca 07 | 18 | (Denmark) Christian Rasmussen | 1–2, 5, 11 |
| (United States) Era Motorsport | Oreca 07 | 18 | (United Kingdom) Oliver Jarvis | 1 |
| (Denmark) High Class Racing | Oreca 07 | 20 | (United Arab Emirates) Ed Jones | All |
| (Denmark) High Class Racing | Oreca 07 | 20 | (Denmark) Dennis Andersen | 1–2, 4, 8, 10–11 |
| (Denmark) High Class Racing | Oreca 07 | 20 | (Denmark) Anders Fjordbach | 1–2, 5, 11 |
| (Denmark) High Class Racing | Oreca 07 | 20 | (Switzerland) Raffaele Marciello | 1 |
| (Denmark) High Class Racing | Oreca 07 | 20 | (United States) Mark Kvamme | 5 |
| (United States) Rick Ware Racing | Oreca 07 | 51 | (United States) Eric Lux | 1–2, 4–5 |
| (United States) Rick Ware Racing | Oreca 07 | 51 | (Canada) Devlin DeFrancesco | 1–2, 5 |
| (United States) Rick Ware Racing | Oreca 07 | 51 | (Brazil) Pietro Fittipaldi | 1–2, 5 |
| (United States) Rick Ware Racing | Oreca 07 | 51 | (United States) Austin Cindric | 1 |
| (United States) Rick Ware Racing | Oreca 07 | 51 | (Colombia) Juan Pablo Montoya | 4 |
| (United States) PR1/Mathiasen Motorsports | Oreca 07 | 52 | (France) Paul-Loup Chatin | All |
| (United States) PR1/Mathiasen Motorsports | Oreca 07 | 52 | (United States) Ben Keating | All |
| (United States) PR1/Mathiasen Motorsports | Oreca 07 | 52 | (United Kingdom) Alex Quinn | 1–2, 5, 11 |
| (United States) PR1/Mathiasen Motorsports | Oreca 07 | 52 | (France) Nicolas Lapierre | 1 |
| (Germany) Proton Competition | Oreca 07 | 55 | (Australia) James Allen | 1 |
| (Germany) Proton Competition | Oreca 07 | 55 | (Italy) Gianmaria Bruni | 1 |
| (Germany) Proton Competition | Oreca 07 | 55 | (Italy) Francesco Pizzi | 1 |
| (Germany) Proton Competition | Oreca 07 | 55 | (United States) Fred Poordad | 1 |
| (Italy) AF Corse | Oreca 07 | 88 | (Denmark) Nicklas Nielsen | 1, 5 |
| (Italy) AF Corse | Oreca 07 | 88 | (France) François Perrodo | 1, 11 |
| (Italy) AF Corse | Oreca 07 | 88 | (France) Matthieu Vaxivière | 1, 11 |
| (Italy) AF Corse | Oreca 07 | 88 | (France) Julien Canal | 1 |
| (Italy) AF Corse | Oreca 07 | 88 | (Argentina) Luis Pérez Companc | 5 |
| (Italy) AF Corse | Oreca 07 | 88 | (France) Lilou Wadoux | 5 |
| (Italy) AF Corse | Oreca 07 | 88 | (France) Emmanuel Collard | 11 |

=== Le Mans Prototype 3 (LMP3) ===
In accordance with the 2020 LMP3 regulations, all cars in the LMP3 class use the Nissan VK56DE 5.6L V8 engine.

| Team | Chassis | No. | Drivers | Rounds |
|---|---|---|---|---|
| (United States) Ave Motorsports | Ligier JS P320 | 4 | (Estonia) Tõnis Kasemets | 2, 5, 8 |
| (United States) Ave Motorsports | Ligier JS P320 | 4 | (United States) Seth Lucas | 2, 5, 8 |
| (United States) Ave Motorsports | Ligier JS P320 | 4 | (United States) Trenton Estep | 2, 5 |
| (United States) Ave Motorsports | Ligier JS P320 | 4 | (Canada) Antoine Comeau | 6 |
| (United States) Ave Motorsports | Ligier JS P320 | 4 | (Canada) George Staikos | 6 |
| (United States) Ave Motorsports | Ligier JS P320 | 4 | (United States) Kevin Conway | 10 |
| (United States) Ave Motorsports | Ligier JS P320 | 4 | (United States) John Geesbreght | 10 |
| (Canada) AWA | Duqueine M30 - D08 | 13 | (United Kingdom) Matt Bell | All |
| (Canada) AWA | Duqueine M30 - D08 | 13 | (Canada) Orey Fidani | All |
| (Canada) AWA | Duqueine M30 - D08 | 13 | (Germany) Lars Kern | 1–2, 5, 11 |
| (Canada) AWA | Duqueine M30 - D08 | 13 | (Germany) Moritz Kranz | 1 |
| (Canada) AWA | Duqueine M30 - D08 | 17 | (United Kingdom) Wayne Boyd | All |
| (Canada) AWA | Duqueine M30 - D08 | 17 | (Canada) Anthony Mantella | All |
| (Canada) AWA | Duqueine M30 - D08 | 17 | (Argentina) Nicolás Varrone | 1–2, 5, 11 |
| (Canada) AWA | Duqueine M30 - D08 | 17 | (United States) Thomas Merrill | 1 |
| (United States) Jr III Motorsports | Ligier JS P320 | 29 | (United States) Bijoy Garg | 8, 10 |
| (United States) Jr III Motorsports | Ligier JS P320 | 29 | (United Kingdom) Colin Noble | 8 |
| (United States) Jr III Motorsports | Ligier JS P320 | 29 | (Portugal) Guilherme Oliveira | 10 |
| (United States) Jr III Motorsports | Ligier JS P320 | 30 | (Canada) Garett Grist | 2, 5–6, 8, 10–11 |
| (United States) Jr III Motorsports | Ligier JS P320 | 30 | (United States) Ari Balogh | 2, 5–6, 8 |
| (United States) Jr III Motorsports | Ligier JS P320 | 30 | (United States) Dakota Dickerson | 2, 5, 11 |
| (United States) Jr III Motorsports | Ligier JS P320 | 30 | (United States) Dylan Murry | 5 |
| (United States) Jr III Motorsports | Ligier JS P320 | 30 | (United States) Nolan Siegel | 10 |
| (United States) Jr III Motorsports | Ligier JS P320 | 30 | (United States) Bijoy Garg | 11 |
| (United States) Sean Creech Motorsport | Ligier JS P320 | 33 | (Portugal) João Barbosa | 1–2, 5–6, 8, 10 |
| (United States) Sean Creech Motorsport | Ligier JS P320 | 33 | (United States) Lance Willsey | 1–2, 5–6, 10 |
| (United States) Sean Creech Motorsport | Ligier JS P320 | 33 | (Chile) Nico Pino | 1–2, 5, 8 |
| (United States) Sean Creech Motorsport | Ligier JS P320 | 33 | (United States) Nolan Siegel | 1 |
| (United States) Andretti Autosport | Ligier JS P320 | 36 | (United States) Jarett Andretti | 1–2, 5, 11 |
| (United States) Andretti Autosport | Ligier JS P320 | 36 | (Colombia) Gabby Chaves | 1–2, 5, 11 |
| (United States) Andretti Autosport | Ligier JS P320 | 36 | (Netherlands) Glenn van Berlo | 2, 5, 11 |
| (United States) Andretti Autosport | Ligier JS P320 | 36 | (United States) Dakota Dickerson | 1 |
| (United States) Andretti Autosport | Ligier JS P320 | 36 | (Sweden) Rasmus Lindh | 1 |
| (United States) Performance Tech Motorsports | Ligier JS P320 | 38 | (United States) Connor Bloum | 1, 5, 10 |
| (United States) Performance Tech Motorsports | Ligier JS P320 | 38 | (United States) Christopher Allen | 1–2, 5 |
| (United States) Performance Tech Motorsports | Ligier JS P320 | 38 | (Australia) Cameron Shields | 1, 11 |
| (United States) Performance Tech Motorsports | Ligier JS P320 | 38 | (United States) John De Angelis | 1 |
| (United States) Performance Tech Motorsports | Ligier JS P320 | 38 | (United States) Robert Mau | 2 |
| (United States) Performance Tech Motorsports | Ligier JS P320 | 38 | (United States) Tristan Nunez | 2 |
| (United States) Performance Tech Motorsports | Ligier JS P320 | 38 | (United States) Alex Kirby | 5 |
| (United States) Performance Tech Motorsports | Ligier JS P320 | 38 | (United States) Alexander Koreiba | 10 |
| (United States) Performance Tech Motorsports | Ligier JS P320 | 38 | (United States) Brian Thienes | 11 |
| (United States) Performance Tech Motorsports | Ligier JS P320 | 38 | (Canada) Jonathan Woolridge | 11 |
| (Germany) MRS GT-Racing | Ligier JS P320 | 43 | (Mexico) Sebastián Álvarez | 1 |
| (Germany) MRS GT-Racing | Ligier JS P320 | 43 | (United States) James French | 1 |
| (Germany) MRS GT-Racing | Ligier JS P320 | 43 | (Singapore) Danial Frost | 1 |
| (Germany) MRS GT-Racing | Ligier JS P320 | 43 | (Portugal) Guilherme Oliveira | 1 |
| (United States) MLT Motorsports | Ligier JS P320 | 54 | (United States) Jason Rabe | 5, 10 |
| (United States) MLT Motorsports | Ligier JS P320 | 54 | (United Kingdom) Stevan McAleer | 5 |
| (United States) MLT Motorsports | Ligier JS P320 | 54 | (United States) Andrew Pinkerton | 5 |
| (United States) MLT Motorsports | Ligier JS P320 | 54 | (United States) Dakota Dickerson | 10 |
| (United States) Riley Motorsports | Ligier JS P320 | 74 | (United States) Gar Robinson | All |
| (United States) Riley Motorsports | Ligier JS P320 | 74 | (Brazil) Felipe Fraga | 1–2, 5–6, 10–11 |
| (United States) Riley Motorsports | Ligier JS P320 | 74 | (Australia) Josh Burdon | 1–2, 5, 8, 11 |
| (United States) Riley Motorsports | Ligier JS P320 | 74 | (Netherlands) Glenn van Berlo | 1 |
| (United States) JDC–Miller MotorSports | Duqueine M30 - D08 | 85 | (United Kingdom) Till Bechtolsheimer | 1–2, 5, 11 |
| (United States) JDC–Miller MotorSports | Duqueine M30 - D08 | 85 | (United States) Dan Goldburg | 2, 5, 11 |
| (United States) JDC–Miller MotorSports | Duqueine M30 - D08 | 85 | (Netherlands) Tijmen van der Helm | 1–2 |
| (United States) JDC–Miller MotorSports | Duqueine M30 - D08 | 85 | (Sweden) Rasmus Lindh | 5, 11 |
| (United States) JDC–Miller MotorSports | Duqueine M30 - D08 | 85 | (United States) Mason Filippi | 1 |
| (United States) JDC–Miller MotorSports | Duqueine M30 - D08 | 85 | (United States) Luca Mars | 1 |
| (United States) JDC–Miller MotorSports | Duqueine M30 - D08 | 85 | (Australia) Scott Andrews | 8 |
| (United States) JDC–Miller MotorSports | Duqueine M30 - D08 | 85 | (United States) Gerry Kraut | 8 |
| (United States) FastMD Racing | Duqueine M30 - D08 | 87 | (United States) Nick Boulle | 1 |
| (United States) FastMD Racing | Duqueine M30 - D08 | 87 | (Japan) Yu Kanamaru | 1 |
| (United States) FastMD Racing | Duqueine M30 - D08 | 87 | (Canada) Antonio Serravalle | 1 |
| (United States) FastMD Racing | Duqueine M30 - D08 | 87 | (Canada) James Vance | 1 |

=== GT Daytona (GTD Pro / GTD) ===
| Team | Chassis | Engine | No. | Drivers | Rounds |
GTD Pro
| (United States) Corvette Racing | Chevrolet Corvette C8.R GTD | Chevrolet LT6.R 5.5 L V8 | 3 | (Spain) Antonio García | All |
| (United States) Corvette Racing | Chevrolet Corvette C8.R GTD | Chevrolet LT6.R 5.5 L V8 | 3 | (United States) Jordan Taylor | All |
| (United States) Corvette Racing | Chevrolet Corvette C8.R GTD | Chevrolet LT6.R 5.5 L V8 | 3 | (United States) Tommy Milner | 1–2, 11 |
| (Canada) Pfaff Motorsports | Porsche 911 GT3 R (992) | Porsche M97/80 4.2 L Flat-6 | 9 | (Austria) Klaus Bachler | All |
| (Canada) Pfaff Motorsports | Porsche 911 GT3 R (992) | Porsche M97/80 4.2 L Flat-6 | 9 | (France) Patrick Pilet | All |
| (Canada) Pfaff Motorsports | Porsche 911 GT3 R (992) | Porsche M97/80 4.2 L Flat-6 | 9 | (Belgium) Laurens Vanthoor | 1–2 |
| (Canada) Pfaff Motorsports | Porsche 911 GT3 R (992) | Porsche M97/80 4.2 L Flat-6 | 9 | (France) Kévin Estre | 11 |
| (United States) Vasser Sullivan | Lexus RC F GT3 | Toyota 2UR-GSE 5.4 L V8 | 14 | (United Kingdom) Ben Barnicoat | All |
| (United States) Vasser Sullivan | Lexus RC F GT3 | Toyota 2UR-GSE 5.4 L V8 | 14 | (United Kingdom) Jack Hawksworth | All |
| (United States) Vasser Sullivan | Lexus RC F GT3 | Toyota 2UR-GSE 5.4 L V8 | 14 | (United Kingdom) Mike Conway | 1 |
| (United States) Vasser Sullivan | Lexus RC F GT3 | Toyota 2UR-GSE 5.4 L V8 | 14 | (United States) Kyle Kirkwood | 2, 11 |
| (United States) Heart of Racing Team | Aston Martin Vantage AMR GT3 | Aston Martin M177 4.0 L Turbo V8 | 23 | (United Kingdom) Ross Gunn | All |
| (United States) Heart of Racing Team | Aston Martin Vantage AMR GT3 | Aston Martin M177 4.0 L Turbo V8 | 23 | (Spain) Alex Riberas | All |
| (United States) Heart of Racing Team | Aston Martin Vantage AMR GT3 | Aston Martin M177 4.0 L Turbo V8 | 23 | (United Kingdom) David Pittard | 1–2, 11 |
| (United States) MDK Motorsports | Porsche 911 GT3 R (992) | Porsche M97/80 4.2 L Flat-6 | 53 | (United States) Trenton Estep | 1 |
| (United States) MDK Motorsports | Porsche 911 GT3 R (992) | Porsche M97/80 4.2 L Flat-6 | 53 | (United States) Jason Hart | 1 |
| (United States) MDK Motorsports | Porsche 911 GT3 R (992) | Porsche M97/80 4.2 L Flat-6 | 53 | (United States) Mark Kvamme | 1 |
| (United States) MDK Motorsports | Porsche 911 GT3 R (992) | Porsche M97/80 4.2 L Flat-6 | 53 | (Denmark) Jan Magnussen | 1 |
| (Italy) AF Corse | Ferrari 296 GT3 | Ferrari F163CE 3.0 L Turbo V6 | 61 | (United Kingdom) Simon Mann | 5, 11 |
| (Italy) AF Corse | Ferrari 296 GT3 | Ferrari F163CE 3.0 L Turbo V6 | 61 | (Spain) Miguel Molina | 5, 11 |
| (Italy) AF Corse | Ferrari 296 GT3 | Ferrari F163CE 3.0 L Turbo V6 | 61 | (Belgium) Ulysse de Pauw | 5 |
| (Italy) AF Corse | Ferrari 296 GT3 | Ferrari F163CE 3.0 L Turbo V6 | 61 | (United Kingdom) James Calado | 11 |
| (United States) Risi Competizione | Ferrari 296 GT3 | Ferrari F163CE 3.0 L Turbo V6 | 62 | (Italy) Davide Rigon | 1–2, 5, 11 |
| (United States) Risi Competizione | Ferrari 296 GT3 | Ferrari F163CE 3.0 L Turbo V6 | 62 | (Brazil) Daniel Serra | 1–2, 5, 11 |
| (United States) Risi Competizione | Ferrari 296 GT3 | Ferrari F163CE 3.0 L Turbo V6 | 62 | (Italy) Alessandro Pier Guidi | 1, 11 |
| (United States) Risi Competizione | Ferrari 296 GT3 | Ferrari F163CE 3.0 L Turbo V6 | 62 | (United Kingdom) James Calado | 1 |
| (United States) Risi Competizione | Ferrari 296 GT3 | Ferrari F163CE 3.0 L Turbo V6 | 62 | (Brazil) Gabriel Casagrande | 2 |
| (Italy) Iron Lynx | Lamborghini Huracán GT3 Evo 2 | Lamborghini DGF 5.2 L V10 | 63 | (South Africa) Jordan Pepper | 1–2, 5, 11 |
| (Italy) Iron Lynx | Lamborghini Huracán GT3 Evo 2 | Lamborghini DGF 5.2 L V10 | 63 | (France) Romain Grosjean | 1–2 |
| (Italy) Iron Lynx | Lamborghini Huracán GT3 Evo 2 | Lamborghini DGF 5.2 L V10 | 63 | (Italy) Andrea Caldarelli | 1, 5 |
| (Italy) Iron Lynx | Lamborghini Huracán GT3 Evo 2 | Lamborghini DGF 5.2 L V10 | 63 | (Italy) Mirko Bortolotti | 1, 11 |
| (Italy) Iron Lynx | Lamborghini Huracán GT3 Evo 2 | Lamborghini DGF 5.2 L V10 | 63 | (France) Franck Perera | 2, 11 |
| (United Kingdom) TGM/TF Sport | Aston Martin Vantage AMR GT3 | Aston Martin M177 4.0 L Turbo V8 | 64 | (United States) Ted Giovanis | 1 |
| (United Kingdom) TGM/TF Sport | Aston Martin Vantage AMR GT3 | Aston Martin M177 4.0 L Turbo V8 | 64 | (United States) Hugh Plumb | 1 |
| (United Kingdom) TGM/TF Sport | Aston Martin Vantage AMR GT3 | Aston Martin M177 4.0 L Turbo V8 | 64 | (United States) Matt Plumb | 1 |
| (United Kingdom) TGM/TF Sport | Aston Martin Vantage AMR GT3 | Aston Martin M177 4.0 L Turbo V8 | 64 | (United States) Owen Trinkler | 1 |
| (United States) WeatherTech Racing | Mercedes-AMG GT3 Evo | Mercedes-AMG M159 6.2 L V8 | 79 | (Andorra) Jules Gounon | All |
| (United States) WeatherTech Racing | Mercedes-AMG GT3 Evo | Mercedes-AMG M159 6.2 L V8 | 79 | (Spain) Daniel Juncadella | All |
| (United States) WeatherTech Racing | Mercedes-AMG GT3 Evo | Mercedes-AMG M159 6.2 L V8 | 79 | (Germany) Maro Engel | 1–2, 11 |
| (United States) WeatherTech Racing | Mercedes-AMG GT3 Evo | Mercedes-AMG M159 6.2 L V8 | 79 | (United States) Cooper MacNeil | 1 |
| (United States) Turner Motorsport | BMW M4 GT3 | BMW S58B30T0 3.0 L Turbo I6 | 95 | (United States) Bill Auberlen | 1–2, 5 |
| (United States) Turner Motorsport | BMW M4 GT3 | BMW S58B30T0 3.0 L Turbo I6 | 95 | (United States) John Edwards | 1–2, 5 |
| (United States) Turner Motorsport | BMW M4 GT3 | BMW S58B30T0 3.0 L Turbo I6 | 95 | (United States) Chandler Hull | 1–2, 5 |
| (United States) Turner Motorsport | BMW M4 GT3 | BMW S58B30T0 3.0 L Turbo I6 | 95 | (Canada) Bruno Spengler | 1 |
GTD
| (United States) Triarsi Competizione | Ferrari 296 GT3 | Ferrari F163CE 3.0 L Turbo V6 | 023 | (Italy) Alessio Rovera | 1–2, 5, 11 |
| (United States) Triarsi Competizione | Ferrari 296 GT3 | Ferrari F163CE 3.0 L Turbo V6 | 023 | (United States) Charlie Scardina | 1–2, 5, 11 |
| (United States) Triarsi Competizione | Ferrari 296 GT3 | Ferrari F163CE 3.0 L Turbo V6 | 023 | (United States) Onofrio Triarsi | 1–2, 5, 11 |
| (United States) Triarsi Competizione | Ferrari 296 GT3 | Ferrari F163CE 3.0 L Turbo V6 | 023 | (Italy) Andrea Bertolini | 1 |
| (United States) Paul Miller Racing | BMW M4 GT3 | BMW S58B30T0 3.0 L Turbo I6 | 1 | (United States) Bryan Sellers | All |
| (United States) Paul Miller Racing | BMW M4 GT3 | BMW S58B30T0 3.0 L Turbo I6 | 1 | (United States) Madison Snow | All |
| (United States) Paul Miller Racing | BMW M4 GT3 | BMW S58B30T0 3.0 L Turbo I6 | 1 | (United States) Corey Lewis | 1–2, 5, 11 |
| (United States) Paul Miller Racing | BMW M4 GT3 | BMW S58B30T0 3.0 L Turbo I6 | 1 | (Belgium) Maxime Martin | 1 |
| (United States) Vasser Sullivan | Lexus RC F GT3 | Toyota 2UR-GSE 5.4 L V8 | 12 | (United States) Frankie Montecalvo | All |
| (United States) Vasser Sullivan | Lexus RC F GT3 | Toyota 2UR-GSE 5.4 L V8 | 12 | (United States) Aaron Telitz | All |
| (United States) Vasser Sullivan | Lexus RC F GT3 | Toyota 2UR-GSE 5.4 L V8 | 12 | (Canada) Parker Thompson | 1–2, 5, 11 |
| (United States) Vasser Sullivan | Lexus RC F GT3 | Toyota 2UR-GSE 5.4 L V8 | 12 | (United States) Kyle Kirkwood | 1 |
| (United States) Lone Star Racing | Mercedes-AMG GT3 Evo | Mercedes-AMG M159 6.2 L V8 | 15 | (Australia) Scott Andrews | 10 |
| (United States) Lone Star Racing | Mercedes-AMG GT3 Evo | Mercedes-AMG M159 6.2 L V8 | 15 | (United States) Anton Dias Perera | 10 |
| (United States) Wright Motorsports | Porsche 911 GT3 R (992) | Porsche M97/80 4.2 L Flat-6 | 16 | (United States) Ryan Hardwick | 1–2, 5, 11 |
| (United States) Wright Motorsports | Porsche 911 GT3 R (992) | Porsche M97/80 4.2 L Flat-6 | 16 | (Belgium) Jan Heylen | 1–2, 5, 11 |
| (United States) Wright Motorsports | Porsche 911 GT3 R (992) | Porsche M97/80 4.2 L Flat-6 | 16 | (Canada) Zacharie Robichon | 1–2, 5, 11 |
| (United States) Wright Motorsports | Porsche 911 GT3 R (992) | Porsche M97/80 4.2 L Flat-6 | 16 | (Norway) Dennis Olsen | 1 |
| (United States) Wright Motorsports | Porsche 911 GT3 R (992) | Porsche M97/80 4.2 L Flat-6 | 77 | (United States) Alan Brynjolfsson | All |
| (United States) Wright Motorsports | Porsche 911 GT3 R (992) | Porsche M97/80 4.2 L Flat-6 | 77 | (United States) Trent Hindman | All |
| (United States) Wright Motorsports | Porsche 911 GT3 R (992) | Porsche M97/80 4.2 L Flat-6 | 77 | (United States) Maxwell Root | 1–2, 5, 11 |
| (United States) Wright Motorsports | Porsche 911 GT3 R (992) | Porsche M97/80 4.2 L Flat-6 | 77 | (France) Kévin Estre | 1 |
| (Italy) Iron Lynx | Lamborghini Huracán GT3 Evo 2 | Lamborghini DGF 5.2 L V10 | 19 | (Italy) Raffaele Giammaria | 1 |
| (Italy) Iron Lynx | Lamborghini Huracán GT3 Evo 2 | Lamborghini DGF 5.2 L V10 | 19 | (Switzerland) Rolf Ineichen | 1 |
| (Italy) Iron Lynx | Lamborghini Huracán GT3 Evo 2 | Lamborghini DGF 5.2 L V10 | 19 | (France) Franck Perera | 1 |
| (Italy) Iron Lynx | Lamborghini Huracán GT3 Evo 2 | Lamborghini DGF 5.2 L V10 | 19 | (Italy) Claudio Schiavoni | 1 |
| (Italy) Iron Dames | Lamborghini Huracán GT3 Evo 2 | Lamborghini DGF 5.2 L V10 | 83 | (Switzerland) Rahel Frey | 1–2, 5, 11 |
| (Italy) Iron Dames | Lamborghini Huracán GT3 Evo 2 | Lamborghini DGF 5.2 L V10 | 83 | (Denmark) Michelle Gatting | 1–2, 5, 11 |
| (Italy) Iron Dames | Lamborghini Huracán GT3 Evo 2 | Lamborghini DGF 5.2 L V10 | 83 | (France) Doriane Pin | 1, 5, 11 |
| (Italy) Iron Dames | Lamborghini Huracán GT3 Evo 2 | Lamborghini DGF 5.2 L V10 | 83 | (Belgium) Sarah Bovy | 1–2 |
| (Italy) AF Corse | Ferrari 296 GT3 | Ferrari F163CE 3.0 L Turbo V6 | 21 | (Italy) Francesco Castellacci | 1–2 |
| (Italy) AF Corse | Ferrari 296 GT3 | Ferrari F163CE 3.0 L Turbo V6 | 21 | (United Kingdom) Simon Mann | 1–2 |
| (Italy) AF Corse | Ferrari 296 GT3 | Ferrari F163CE 3.0 L Turbo V6 | 21 | (Spain) Miguel Molina | 1–2 |
| (Italy) AF Corse | Ferrari 296 GT3 | Ferrari F163CE 3.0 L Turbo V6 | 21 | (Argentina) Luis Pérez Companc | 1 |
| (United States) Heart of Racing Team | Aston Martin Vantage AMR GT3 | Aston Martin M177 4.0 L Turbo V8 | 27 | (Canada) Roman De Angelis | All |
| (United States) Heart of Racing Team | Aston Martin Vantage AMR GT3 | Aston Martin M177 4.0 L Turbo V8 | 27 | (Denmark) Marco Sørensen | All |
| (United States) Heart of Racing Team | Aston Martin Vantage AMR GT3 | Aston Martin M177 4.0 L Turbo V8 | 27 | (United Kingdom) Ian James | 1–2, 5, 11 |
| (United States) Heart of Racing Team | Aston Martin Vantage AMR GT3 | Aston Martin M177 4.0 L Turbo V8 | 27 | (United Kingdom) Darren Turner | 1 |
| (United States) / Team Korthoff Motorsports (Note: Car entered as Team Korthoff Motorsports at Rounds 1 to 9 and as Korthoff Preston Motorsports from Round 10.); (United States) / Korthoff Preston Motorsports | Mercedes-AMG GT3 Evo | Mercedes-AMG M159 6.2 L V8 | 32 | (Canada) Mikaël Grenier | All |
| (United States) / Team Korthoff Motorsports; (United States) / Korthoff Preston Motorsports | Mercedes-AMG GT3 Evo | Mercedes-AMG M159 6.2 L V8 | 32 | (United States) Mike Skeen | All |
| (United States) / Team Korthoff Motorsports; (United States) / Korthoff Preston Motorsports | Mercedes-AMG GT3 Evo | Mercedes-AMG M159 6.2 L V8 | 32 | (United States) Kenton Koch | 1–2, 5, 11 |
| (United States) / Team Korthoff Motorsports; (United States) / Korthoff Preston Motorsports | Mercedes-AMG GT3 Evo | Mercedes-AMG M159 6.2 L V8 | 32 | (Germany) Maximilian Götz | 1 |
| (United States) NTE Sport | Lamborghini Huracán GT3 Evo 2 | Lamborghini DGF 5.2 L V10 | 42 | (United States) Jaden Conwright | 1, 5 |
| (United States) NTE Sport | Lamborghini Huracán GT3 Evo 2 | Lamborghini DGF 5.2 L V10 | 42 | (Italy) Alessio Deledda | 1 |
| (United States) NTE Sport | Lamborghini Huracán GT3 Evo 2 | Lamborghini DGF 5.2 L V10 | 42 | (China) Kerong Li | 1 |
| (United States) NTE Sport | Lamborghini Huracán GT3 Evo 2 | Lamborghini DGF 5.2 L V10 | 42 | (United States) Robert Megennis | 1 |
| (United States) NTE Sport | Lamborghini Huracán GT3 Evo 2 | Lamborghini DGF 5.2 L V10 | 42 | (United States) Luke Berkeley | 5 |
| (United States) NTE Sport | Lamborghini Huracán GT3 Evo 2 | Lamborghini DGF 5.2 L V10 | 42 | (United States) Rob Ferriol | 5 |
| (United States) Magnus Racing | Aston Martin Vantage AMR GT3 | Aston Martin M177 4.0 L Turbo V8 | 44 | (United States) Andy Lally | 1–2, 4–5, 11 |
| (United States) Magnus Racing | Aston Martin Vantage AMR GT3 | Aston Martin M177 4.0 L Turbo V8 | 44 | (United States) John Potter | 1–2, 4–5, 11 |
| (United States) Magnus Racing | Aston Martin Vantage AMR GT3 | Aston Martin M177 4.0 L Turbo V8 | 44 | (United States) Spencer Pumpelly | 1–2, 5, 11 |
| (United States) Magnus Racing | Aston Martin Vantage AMR GT3 | Aston Martin M177 4.0 L Turbo V8 | 44 | (Denmark) Nicki Thiim | 1 |
| (Italy) Cetilar Racing | Ferrari 296 GT3 | Ferrari F163CE 3.0 L Turbo V6 | 47 | (Italy) Antonio Fuoco | 1–2, 5, 11 |
| (Italy) Cetilar Racing | Ferrari 296 GT3 | Ferrari F163CE 3.0 L Turbo V6 | 47 | (Italy) Roberto Lacorte | 1–2, 5, 11 |
| (Italy) Cetilar Racing | Ferrari 296 GT3 | Ferrari F163CE 3.0 L Turbo V6 | 47 | (Italy) Giorgio Sernagiotto | 1–2, 5, 11 |
| (Italy) Cetilar Racing | Ferrari 296 GT3 | Ferrari F163CE 3.0 L Turbo V6 | 47 | (Italy) Alessandro Balzan | 1 |
| (United States) Winward Racing | Mercedes-AMG GT3 Evo | Mercedes-AMG M159 6.2 L V8 | 57 | (United States) Russell Ward | All |
| (United States) Winward Racing | Mercedes-AMG GT3 Evo | Mercedes-AMG M159 6.2 L V8 | 57 | (United Kingdom) Philip Ellis | 1–4, 6–11 |
| (United States) Winward Racing | Mercedes-AMG GT3 Evo | Mercedes-AMG M159 6.2 L V8 | 57 | (Netherlands) Indy Dontje | 1–2, 5, 11 |
| (United States) Winward Racing | Mercedes-AMG GT3 Evo | Mercedes-AMG M159 6.2 L V8 | 57 | (Canada) Daniel Morad | 1 |
| (United States) Winward Racing | Mercedes-AMG GT3 Evo | Mercedes-AMG M159 6.2 L V8 | 57 | (Switzerland) Raffaele Marciello | 5 |
| (United States) Gradient Racing | Acura NSX GT3 Evo22 | Acura JNC1 3.5 L Turbo V6 | 66 | (United Kingdom) Katherine Legge | All |
| (United States) Gradient Racing | Acura NSX GT3 Evo22 | Acura JNC1 3.5 L Turbo V6 | 66 | (United States) Sheena Monk | All |
| (United States) Gradient Racing | Acura NSX GT3 Evo22 | Acura JNC1 3.5 L Turbo V6 | 66 | (United States) Marc Miller | 1–2, 5, 11 |
| (United States) Gradient Racing | Acura NSX GT3 Evo22 | Acura JNC1 3.5 L Turbo V6 | 66 | (Germany) Mario Farnbacher | 1 |
| (United Kingdom) Inception Racing | McLaren 720S GT3 1 McLaren 720S GT3 Evo 10 | McLaren M840T 4.0 L Turbo V8 | 70 | (United States) Brendan Iribe | All |
| (United Kingdom) Inception Racing | McLaren 720S GT3 1 McLaren 720S GT3 Evo 10 | McLaren M840T 4.0 L Turbo V8 | 70 | (Denmark) Frederik Schandorff | All |
| (United Kingdom) Inception Racing | McLaren 720S GT3 1 McLaren 720S GT3 Evo 10 | McLaren M840T 4.0 L Turbo V8 | 70 | (United Kingdom) Ollie Millroy | 1–2, 5, 11 |
| (United Kingdom) Inception Racing | McLaren 720S GT3 1 McLaren 720S GT3 Evo 10 | McLaren M840T 4.0 L Turbo V8 | 70 | (Germany) Marvin Kirchhöfer | 1 |
| (Australia) SunEnergy1 Racing | Mercedes-AMG GT3 Evo | Mercedes-AMG M159 6.2 L V8 | 75 | (Australia) Kenny Habul | 1 |
| (Australia) SunEnergy1 Racing | Mercedes-AMG GT3 Evo | Mercedes-AMG M159 6.2 L V8 | 75 | (Zimbabwe) Axcil Jefferies | 1 |
| (Australia) SunEnergy1 Racing | Mercedes-AMG GT3 Evo | Mercedes-AMG M159 6.2 L V8 | 75 | (Germany) Fabian Schiller | 1 |
| (Australia) SunEnergy1 Racing | Mercedes-AMG GT3 Evo | Mercedes-AMG M159 6.2 L V8 | 75 | (Germany) Luca Stolz | 1 |
| (United States) Forte Racing powered by US RaceTronics | Lamborghini Huracán GT3 Evo 2 | Lamborghini DGF 5.2 L V10 | 78 | (Canada) Misha Goikhberg | All |
| (United States) Forte Racing powered by US RaceTronics | Lamborghini Huracán GT3 Evo 2 | Lamborghini DGF 5.2 L V10 | 78 | (Italy) Loris Spinelli | All |
| (United States) Forte Racing powered by US RaceTronics | Lamborghini Huracán GT3 Evo 2 | Lamborghini DGF 5.2 L V10 | 78 | (Chile) Benjamín Hites | 1–2 |
| (United States) Forte Racing powered by US RaceTronics | Lamborghini Huracán GT3 Evo 2 | Lamborghini DGF 5.2 L V10 | 78 | (United States) Patrick Liddy | 5, 11 |
| (United States) Forte Racing powered by US RaceTronics | Lamborghini Huracán GT3 Evo 2 | Lamborghini DGF 5.2 L V10 | 78 | (Italy) Marco Mapelli | 1 |
| (United States) AO Racing Team | Porsche 911 GT3 R (992) | Porsche M97/80 4.2 L Flat-6 | 80 | (United Kingdom) Sebastian Priaulx | All |
| (United States) AO Racing Team | Porsche 911 GT3 R (992) | Porsche M97/80 4.2 L Flat-6 | 80 | (United States) P. J. Hyett | 1–3, 5–11 |
| (United States) AO Racing Team | Porsche 911 GT3 R (992) | Porsche M97/80 4.2 L Flat-6 | 80 | (United States) Gunnar Jeannette | 1–2, 4–5, 11 |
| (United States) AO Racing Team | Porsche 911 GT3 R (992) | Porsche M97/80 4.2 L Flat-6 | 80 | (United Kingdom) Harry Tincknell | 1 |
| (United States) Kelly-Moss with Riley | Porsche 911 GT3 R (992) | Porsche M97/80 4.2 L Flat-6 | 91 | (Netherlands) Kay van Berlo | 1–10 |
| (United States) Kelly-Moss with Riley | Porsche 911 GT3 R (992) | Porsche M97/80 4.2 L Flat-6 | 91 | (United States) Alan Metni | 1–10 |
| (United States) Kelly-Moss with Riley | Porsche 911 GT3 R (992) | Porsche M97/80 4.2 L Flat-6 | 91 | (New Zealand) Jaxon Evans | 1–2, 5 |
| (United States) Kelly-Moss with Riley | Porsche 911 GT3 R (992) | Porsche M97/80 4.2 L Flat-6 | 91 | (France) Julien Andlauer | 1 |
| (United States) Kelly-Moss with Riley | Porsche 911 GT3 R (992) | Porsche M97/80 4.2 L Flat-6 | 92 | (United States) Alec Udell | All |
| (United States) Kelly-Moss with Riley | Porsche 911 GT3 R (992) | Porsche M97/80 4.2 L Flat-6 | 92 | (United States) David Brule | 1–2, 5–6, 8–11 |
| (United States) Kelly-Moss with Riley | Porsche 911 GT3 R (992) | Porsche M97/80 4.2 L Flat-6 | 92 | (France) Julien Andlauer | 2, 4–5, 7, 11 |
| (United States) Kelly-Moss with Riley | Porsche 911 GT3 R (992) | Porsche M97/80 4.2 L Flat-6 | 92 | (Netherlands) Jeroen Bleekemolen | 1, 3 |
| (United States) Kelly-Moss with Riley | Porsche 911 GT3 R (992) | Porsche M97/80 4.2 L Flat-6 | 92 | (United States) Andrew Davis | 1 |
| (United States) Racers Edge Motorsports with WTR Andretti | Acura NSX GT3 Evo22 | Acura JNC1 3.5 L Turbo V6 | 93 | (United States) Ashton Harrison | 1–3, 5, 8, 10–11 |
| (United States) Racers Edge Motorsports with WTR Andretti | Acura NSX GT3 Evo22 | Acura JNC1 3.5 L Turbo V6 | 93 | (Costa Rica) Danny Formal | 1–2, 5, 11 |
| (United States) Racers Edge Motorsports with WTR Andretti | Acura NSX GT3 Evo22 | Acura JNC1 3.5 L Turbo V6 | 93 | (Canada) Kyle Marcelli | 1–2, 5, 10–11 |
| (United States) Racers Edge Motorsports with WTR Andretti | Acura NSX GT3 Evo22 | Acura JNC1 3.5 L Turbo V6 | 93 | (Germany) Mario Farnbacher | 3, 8 |
| (United States) Racers Edge Motorsports with WTR Andretti | Acura NSX GT3 Evo22 | Acura JNC1 3.5 L Turbo V6 | 93 | (Australia) Ryan Briscoe | 1 |
| (United States) Andretti Autosport | Aston Martin Vantage AMR GT3 | Aston Martin M177 4.0 L Turbo V8 | 94 | (United States) Jarett Andretti | 4, 7, 10 |
| (United States) Andretti Autosport | Aston Martin Vantage AMR GT3 | Aston Martin M177 4.0 L Turbo V8 | 94 | (Colombia) Gabby Chaves | 4, 7, 10 |
| (United States) Turner Motorsport | BMW M4 GT3 | BMW S58B30T0 3.0 L Turbo I6 | 96 | (United States) Robby Foley | All |
| (United States) Turner Motorsport | BMW M4 GT3 | BMW S58B30T0 3.0 L Turbo I6 | 96 | (United States) Patrick Gallagher | All |
| (United States) Turner Motorsport | BMW M4 GT3 | BMW S58B30T0 3.0 L Turbo I6 | 96 | (United States) Michael Dinan | 1–2, 5, 11 |
| (United States) Turner Motorsport | BMW M4 GT3 | BMW S58B30T0 3.0 L Turbo I6 | 96 | (Germany) Jens Klingmann | 1 |
| (United States) Turner Motorsport | BMW M4 GT3 | BMW S58B30T0 3.0 L Turbo I6 | 97 | (United States) Bill Auberlen | 3–4, 6–11 |
| (United States) Turner Motorsport | BMW M4 GT3 | BMW S58B30T0 3.0 L Turbo I6 | 97 | (United States) Chandler Hull | 3–4, 6–11 |
| (United States) Turner Motorsport | BMW M4 GT3 | BMW S58B30T0 3.0 L Turbo I6 | 97 | (United States) Thomas Merrill | 11 |

== Race results ==
Bold indicates overall and GTD winners.

| Rnd | Circuit | GTP Winning Team | LMP2 Winning Team | LMP3 Winning Team | GTD Pro Winning Team | GTD Winning Team | Report |
| Rnd | Circuit | GTP Winning Drivers | LMP2 Winning Drivers | LMP3 Winning Drivers | GTD Pro Winning Drivers | GTD Winning Drivers | Report |
|---|---|---|---|---|---|---|---|
| 1 | Daytona | **(United States) #60 Meyer Shank Racing with Curb-Agajanian** | (Germany) #55 Proton Competition | (Canada) #17 AWA | (United States) #79 WeatherTech Racing | **(United States) #27 Heart of Racing Team** | Report |
| 1 | Daytona | **(United Kingdom) Tom Blomqvist** **(United States) Colin Braun** **(Brazil) Hélio Castroneves** **(France) Simon Pagenaud** | (Australia) James Allen (Italy) Gianmaria Bruni (Italy) Francesco Pizzi (United States) Fred Poordad | (United Kingdom) Wayne Boyd (Canada) Anthony Mantella (United States) Thomas Merrill (Argentina) Nicolás Varrone | (Germany) Maro Engel (Andorra) Jules Gounon (Spain) Daniel Juncadella (United States) Cooper MacNeil | **(Canada) Roman De Angelis** **(United Kingdom) Ian James** **(Denmark) Marco Sørensen** **(United Kingdom) Darren Turner** | Report |
| 2 | Sebring | **(United States) #31 Whelen Engineering Racing** | (Canada) #8 Tower Motorsports | (United States) #74 Riley Motorsports | **(Canada) #9 Pfaff Motorsports** | (United States) #1 Paul Miller Racing | Report |
| 2 | Sebring | **(United Kingdom) Jack Aitken** **(Brazil) Pipo Derani** **(United Kingdom) Alexander Sims** | (Canada) John Farano (New Zealand) Scott McLaughlin (Barbados) Kyffin Simpson | (Australia) Josh Burdon (Brazil) Felipe Fraga (United States) Gar Robinson | **(Austria) Klaus Bachler** **(France) Patrick Pilet** **(Belgium) Laurens Vanthoor** | (United States) Corey Lewis (United States) Bryan Sellers (United States) Madison Snow | Report |
| 3 | Long Beach | **(Germany) #6 Porsche Penske Motorsport** | did not participate | did not participate | **(United States) #14 Vasser Sullivan** | (United States) #1 Paul Miller Racing | Report |
| 3 | Long Beach | **(France) Mathieu Jaminet** **(United Kingdom) Nick Tandy** | did not participate | did not participate | **(United Kingdom) Ben Barnicoat** **(United Kingdom) Jack Hawksworth** | (United States) Bryan Sellers (United States) Madison Snow | Report |
| 4 | Laguna Seca | **(United States) #01 Cadillac Racing** | (France) #11 TDS Racing | did not participate | (United States) #79 WeatherTech Racing | **(United States) #91 Kelly-Moss with Riley** | Report |
| 4 | Laguna Seca | **(France) Sébastien Bourdais** **(Netherlands) Renger van der Zande** | (Denmark) Mikkel Jensen (United States) Steven Thomas | did not participate | (Andorra) Jules Gounon (Spain) Daniel Juncadella | **(Netherlands) Kay van Berlo** **(United States) Alan Metni** | Report |
| 5 | Watkins Glen | **(United States) #25 BMW M Team RLL** | (United States) #04 CrowdStrike Racing by APR | (United States) #74 Riley Motorsports | (United States) #14 Vasser Sullivan | **(United States) #12 Vasser Sullivan** | Report |
| 5 | Watkins Glen | **(United States) Connor De Phillippi** **(United Kingdom) Nick Yelloly** | (United Kingdom) Ben Hanley (United States) George Kurtz (United States) Nolan Siegel | (Australia) Josh Burdon (Brazil) Felipe Fraga (United States) Gar Robinson | (United Kingdom) Ben Barnicoat (United Kingdom) Jack Hawksworth | **(United States) Frankie Montecalvo** **(United States) Aaron Telitz** **(Canada) Parker Thompson** | Report |
| 6 | Mosport | **(United States) #60 Meyer Shank Racing with Curb-Agajanian** | did not participate | (United States) #74 Riley Motorsports | **(United States) #3 Corvette Racing** | (United States) #1 Paul Miller Racing | Report |
| 6 | Mosport | **(United Kingdom) Tom Blomqvist** **(United States) Colin Braun** | did not participate | (Brazil) Felipe Fraga (United States) Gar Robinson | **(Spain) Antonio García** **(United States) Jordan Taylor** | (United States) Bryan Sellers (United States) Madison Snow | Report |
| 7 | Lime Rock | did not participate | did not participate | did not participate | **(United States) #23 Heart of Racing Team** | (United States) #27 Heart of Racing Team | Report |
| 7 | Lime Rock | did not participate | did not participate | did not participate | **(United Kingdom) Ross Gunn** **(Spain) Alex Riberas** | (Canada) Roman De Angelis (Denmark) Marco Sørensen | Report |
| 8 | Road America | **(Germany) #7 Porsche Penske Motorsport** | (United States) #52 PR1/Mathiasen Motorsports | (United States) #74 Riley Motorsports | **(United States) #23 Heart of Racing Team** | (United States) #1 Paul Miller Racing | Report |
| 8 | Road America | **(Australia) Matt Campbell** **(Brazil) Felipe Nasr** | (France) Paul-Loup Chatin (United States) Ben Keating | (Australia) Josh Burdon (United States) Gar Robinson | **(United Kingdom) Ross Gunn** **(Spain) Alex Riberas** | (United States) Bryan Sellers (United States) Madison Snow | Report |
| 9 | VIR | did not participate | did not participate | did not participate | **(United States) #3 Corvette Racing** | (United States) #1 Paul Miller Racing | Report |
| 9 | VIR | did not participate | did not participate | did not participate | **(Spain) Antonio García** **(United States) Jordan Taylor** | (United States) Bryan Sellers (United States) Madison Snow | Report |
| 10 | Indianapolis | **(Germany) #6 Porsche Penske Motorsport** | (France) #11 TDS Racing | (Canada) #17 AWA | **(United States) #79 WeatherTech Racing** | (United States) #57 Winward Racing | Report |
| 10 | Indianapolis | **(France) Mathieu Jaminet** **(United Kingdom) Nick Tandy** | (Denmark) Mikkel Jensen (United States) Steven Thomas | (United Kingdom) Wayne Boyd (Canada) Anthony Mantella | **(Andorra) Jules Gounon** **(Spain) Daniel Juncadella** | (United States) Russell Ward (United Kingdom) Philip Ellis | Report |
| 11 | Road Atlanta | **(United States) #60 Meyer Shank Racing with Curb-Agajanian** | (United States) #04 CrowdStrike Racing by APR | (United States) #30 JR III Motorsports | **(United States) #79 WeatherTech Racing** | (United States) #78 Forte Racing Powered by US RaceTronics | Report |
| 11 | Road Atlanta | **(United Kingdom) Tom Blomqvist** **(United States) Colin Braun** **(Brazil) Hélio Castroneves** | (United Kingdom) Ben Hanley (United States) George Kurtz (United States) Nolan Siegel | (United States) Bijoy Garg (United States) Dakota Dickerson (Canada) Garett Grist | **(Germany) Maro Engel** **(Andorra) Jules Gounon** **(Spain) Daniel Juncadella** | (Canada) Misha Goikhberg (United States) Patrick Liddy (Italy) Loris Spinelli | Report |

== Championship standings ==
=== Points systems ===
Championship points are awarded in each class at the finish of each event. Points are awarded based on finishing positions in qualifying and the race as shown in the chart below.

| Position | 1 | 2 | 3 | 4 | 5 | 6 | 7 | 8 | 9 | 10 | 11 | 12 | 13 | 14 | 15 | 16 | 17 | 18 | 19 | 20 | 21 | 22 | 23 | 24 | 25 | 26 | 27 | 28 | 29 | 30+ |
|---|---|---|---|---|---|---|---|---|---|---|---|---|---|---|---|---|---|---|---|---|---|---|---|---|---|---|---|---|---|---|
| Qualifying | 35 | 32 | 30 | 28 | 26 | 25 | 24 | 23 | 22 | 21 | 20 | 19 | 18 | 17 | 16 | 15 | 14 | 13 | 12 | 11 | 10 | 9 | 8 | 7 | 6 | 5 | 4 | 3 | 2 | 1 |
| Race | 350 | 320 | 300 | 280 | 260 | 250 | 240 | 230 | 220 | 210 | 200 | 190 | 180 | 170 | 160 | 150 | 140 | 130 | 120 | 110 | 100 | 90 | 80 | 70 | 60 | 50 | 40 | 30 | 20 | 10 |

Drivers points

Points are awarded in each class at the finish of each event.

Team points

Team points are calculated in exactly the same way as driver points, using the point distribution chart. Each car entered is considered its own "team" regardless if it is a single entry or part of a two-car team.

Manufacturer points

There are also a number of manufacturer championships which utilize the same season-long point distribution chart. The manufacturer championships recognized by IMSA are as follows:

Grand Touring Prototype (GTP): Engine & bodywork manufacturer
GT Daytona Pro (GTD Pro): Car manufacturer
GT Daytona (GTD): Car manufacturer

Each manufacturer receives finishing points for its highest finishing car in each class. The positions of subsequent finishing cars from the same manufacturer are not taken into consideration, and all other manufacturers move up in the order.

Example: Manufacturer A finishes 1st and 2nd at an event, and Manufacturer B finishes 3rd. Manufacturer A receives 35 first-place points while Manufacturer B would earn 32 second-place points.

Michelin Endurance Cup

The points system for the Michelin Endurance Cup is different from the normal points system. Points are awarded on a 5–4–3–2 basis for drivers, teams and manufacturers. The first finishing position at each interval earns five points, four points for second position, three points for third, with two points awarded for fourth and each subsequent finishing position.

| Position | 1 | 2 | 3 | Other Classified |
|---|---|---|---|---|
| Race | 5 | 4 | 3 | 2 |

At Rolex 24 at Daytona, points are awarded at 6 hours, 12 hours, 18 hours and at the finish. At the Sebring 12 hours, points are awarded at 4 hours, 8 hours and at the finish. At the Watkins Glen 6 hours, points are awarded at 3 hours and at the finish. At the Petit Le Mans (10 hours), points are awarded at 4 hours, 8 hours and at the finish.

Like the season-long team championship, Michelin Endurance Cup team points are awarded for each car and drivers get points in any car that they drive, in which they are entered for points. The manufacturer points go to the highest placed car from that manufacturer (the others from that manufacturer not being counted), just like the season-long manufacturer championship.

For example: in any particular segment manufacturer A finishes 1st and 2nd and manufacturer B finishes 3rd. Manufacturer A only receives first-place points for that segment. Manufacturer B receives the second-place points.

=== Drivers' Championships ===
==== Standings: Grand Touring Prototype (GTP) ====
| Pos. | Drivers | DAY | SEB | LBH | LGA | WGL | MOS | ELK | IMS | ATL | Points | MEC |
|---|---|---|---|---|---|---|---|---|---|---|---|---|
| 1 | (Brazil) Pipo Derani (United Kingdom) Alexander Sims | 5 | **1** | 5 | 3 | 2 | 7 | **6** | 4 | 6 | 2733 | 40 |
| 2 | (Portugal) Filipe Albuquerque (United States) Ricky Taylor | 2 | 4 | **7** | 4 | 6 | 2 | 3 | 5 | **9** | 2712 | 34 |
| 3 | (United Kingdom) Tom Blomqvist (United States) Colin Braun | **1** | 6 | 6 | 6 | 3 | **1** | 2 | 6 | 1 | 2711 | 21 |
| 4 | (United Kingdom) Nick Tandy (France) Mathieu Jaminet | 8 | 3 | 1 | 2 | **9** | 5 | 7 | 1 | 10 | 2691 | 27 |
| 5 | (Australia) Matt Campbell (Brazil) Felipe Nasr | 7 | 5 | 3 | **9** | 7 | 6 | 1 | **2** | 4 | 2691 | 30 |
| 6 | (United States) Connor De Phillippi (United Kingdom) Nick Yelloly | 9 | 2 | 2 | 8 | 1 | 3 | 10 | 3 | 7 | 2687 | 29 |
| 7 | (France) Sébastien Bourdais (Netherlands) Renger van der Zande | 3 | 7 | 8 | 1 | 5 | 9 | 4 | 7 | 2 | 2673 | 38 |
| 8 | (Austria) Philipp Eng (Brazil) Augusto Farfus | 6 | 8 | 4 | 5 | 8 | 8 | 9 | 10 | 8 | 2341 | 25 |
| 9 | (Netherlands) Tijmen van der Helm (Germany) Mike Rockenfeller | | | | 7 | 4 | 4 | 5 | 8 | 5 | 1660 | 10 |
| 10 | (United Kingdom) Jack Aitken | 5 | **1** | | | 2 | | | | 6 | 1263 | 40 |
| 11 | (Switzerland) Louis Delétraz | 2 | 4 | | | 6 | | | | **9** | 1165 | 34 |
| 12 | (New Zealand) Scott Dixon | 3 | 7 | | | | | | | 2 | 952 | 34 |
| 13 | (South Africa) Sheldon van der Linde | 9 | 2 | | | | | | | 7 | 851 | 22 |
| 14 | (Brazil) Hélio Castroneves | **1** | 6 | | | | | | | 1 | 839 | 15 |
| 15 | (United Kingdom) Harry Tincknell (Italy) Gianmaria Bruni | | | | | | | 8 | 9 | 3 | 814 | 7 |
| 16 | (Germany) Marco Wittmann | 6 | 8 | | | | | | | 8 | 789 | 21 |
| 17 | (United States) Dane Cameron | 8 | 3 | | | | | | | | 580 | 15 |
| 18 | (Denmark) Michael Christensen | 7 | 5 | | | | | | | | 556 | 17 |
| 19 | (New Zealand) Brendon Hartley | 2 | | | | | | | | | 350 | 14 |
| 20 | (Switzerland) Neel Jani | | | | | | | | | 3 | 321 | 7 |
| 21 | (New Zealand) Earl Bamber (United Kingdom) Alex Lynn (United Kingdom) Richard Westbrook | 4 | | | | | | | | | 306 | 9 |
| 22 | (United States) Josef Newgarden | | | | | | | | | 4 | 304 | 9 |
| 23 | (United Kingdom) Jenson Button | | | | | | | | | 5 | 282 | 6 |
| 24 | (United States) Colton Herta | 6 | | | | | | | | | 274 | 8 |
| 25 | (Belgium) Laurens Vanthoor | | | | | | | | | 10 | 236 | 6 |
| 26 | (France) Simon Pagenaud | **1** | | | | | | | | | 185 | 0 |
| Pos. | Drivers | DAY | SEB | LBH | LGA | WGL | MOS | ELK | IMS | ATL | Points | MEC |

| Colour | Result |
|---|---|
| Gold | Winner |
| Silver | Second place |
| Bronze | Third place |
| Green | Points classification |
| Blue | Non-points classification |
| Blue | Non-classified finish (NC) |
| Purple | Retired, not classified (Ret) |
| Red | Did not qualify (DNQ) |
| Red | Did not pre-qualify (DNPQ) |
| Black | Disqualified (DSQ) |
| White | Did not start (DNS) |
| White | Withdrew (WD) |
| White | Race cancelled (C) |
| Blank | Did not practice (DNP) |
| Blank | Did not arrive (DNA) |
| Blank | Excluded (EX) |

**Bold** - Pole position

Italics - Fastest lap

==== Standings: Le Mans Prototype 2 (LMP2) ====
| Pos. | Drivers | DAY^{‡} | SEB | LGA | WGL | ELK | IMS | ATL | Points | MEC |
|---|---|---|---|---|---|---|---|---|---|---|
| 1 | (France) Paul-Loup Chatin (United States) Ben Keating | **7** | **4** | 2 | 3 | 1 | **4** | **3** | 1995 | 39 |
| 2 | (United Kingdom) Ben Hanley (United States) George Kurtz | 2 | 5 | **3** | 1 | **7** | 3 | 1 | 1958 | 42 |
| 3 | (Denmark) Mikkel Jensen (United States) Steven Thomas | 10 | 2 | 1 | **7** | 3 | 1 | 8 | 1942 | 34 |
| 4 | (Netherlands) Giedo van der Garde | 4 | 8 | 4 | 4 | 2 | 5 | 2 | 1832 | 33 |
| 5 | (United Kingdom) Ryan Dalziel (United States) Dwight Merriman | 9 | 3 | 7 | 2 | 6 | 6 | 5 | 1740 | 29 |
| 6 | (United Arab Emirates) Ed Jones | 8 | 6 | 6 | 8 | 5 | 7 | 6 | 1605 | 24 |
| 7 | (Denmark) Dennis Andersen | 8 | 6 | 6 | | 5 | 4 | 6 | 1375 | 20 |
| 8 | (United States) Nolan Siegel | | 5 | | 1 | | | 1 | 1016 | 30 |
| 9 | (United States) John Falb | | | | 4 | 2 | | 2 | 974 | 14 |
| 10 | (United Kingdom) Alex Quinn | **7** | **4** | | 3 | | | **3** | 950 | 39 |
| 11 | (Denmark) Christian Rasmussen | 9 | 3 | | 2 | | | 5 | 926 | 29 |
| 12 | (Switzerland) Louis Delétraz | | | 8 | | 4 | 2 | | 912 | 0 |
| 13 | (Barbados) Kyffin Simpson | 5 | 1 | | 5 | | | 7 | 899 | 30 |
| 14 | (United States) Josh Pierson | 4 | 8 | | 4 | | | 2 | 892 | 33 |
| 15 | (United States) Scott Huffaker | 10 | 2 | | **7** | | | 8 | 852 | 34 |
| 16 | (Denmark) Anders Fjordbach | 8 | 6 | | 8 | | | 6 | 781 | 24 |
| 17 | (United States) Eric Lux | 6 | 7 | 5 | 9 | | | | 770 | 18 |
| 18 | (New Zealand) Scott McLaughlin | 5 | 1 | | | | | 7 | 639 | 26 |
| 19 | (Canada) John Farano | 5 | 1 | 8 | | | | | 629 | 20 |
| 20 | (United States) Rodrigo Sales | | | | | 4 | 5 | | 600 | 0 |
| 21 | (France) François Hériau | 4 | 8 | 4 | | | | | 570 | 19 |
| 22 | (Canada) Devlin DeFrancesco (Brazil) Pietro Fittipaldi | 6 | 7 | | 9 | | | | 484 | 18 |
| 23 | (United States) Dan Goldburg | | | | | | 2 | | 346 | 0 |
| 24 | (France) François Perrodo (France) Matthieu Vaxivière | 3 | | | | | | 4 | 306 | 17 |
| 25 | (France) Emmanuel Collard | | | | | | | 4 | 306 | 6 |
| 26 | (Colombia) Juan Pablo Montoya | | | 5 | | | | | 286 | 0 |
| 27 | (United States) Ari Balogh | | | | | | | 7 | 264 | 6 |
| 28 | (United Kingdom) Will Stevens (Turkey) Salih Yoluç | | | | 5 | | | | 260 | 4 |
| 29 | (Denmark) Nicklas Nielsen | 3 | | | 6 | | | | 250 | 15 |
| 30 | (Argentina) Luis Pérez Companc (France) Lilou Wadoux | | | | 6 | | | | 250 | 4 |
| 31 | (United States) Mark Kvamme | | | | 8 | | | | 230 | 4 |
| 32 | (Australia) James Allen (Italy) Gianmaria Bruni (Italy) Francesco Pizzi (United States) Fred Poordad | 1 | | | | | | | 0 | 14 |
| 33 | (Mexico) Esteban Gutiérrez (United States) Matt McMurry | 2 | | | | | | | 0 | 12 |
| 34 | (France) Julien Canal | 3 | | | | | | | 0 | 11 |
| 35 | (Netherlands) Job van Uitert | 4 | | | | | | | 0 | 13 |
| 36 | (United States) Josef Newgarden | 5 | | | | | | | 0 | 8 |
| 37 | (United States) Austin Cindric | 6 | | | | | | | 0 | 8 |
| 38 | (France) Nicolas Lapierre | **7** | | | | | | | 0 | 11 |
| 39 | (Switzerland) Raffaele Marciello | 8 | | | | | | | 0 | 8 |
| 40 | (United Kingdom) Oliver Jarvis | 9 | | | | | | | 0 | 8 |
| 41 | (Netherlands) Rinus VeeKay | 10 | | | | | | | 0 | 11 |
| Pos. | Drivers | DAY^{‡} | SEB | LGA | WGL | ELK | IMS | ATL | Points | MEC |

‡: Points count towards Michelin Endurance Cup championship only

==== Standings: Le Mans Prototype 3 (LMP3) ====
| Pos. | Drivers | DAY^{‡} | SEB | WGL | MOS | ELK | IMS | ATL | Points | MEC |
|---|---|---|---|---|---|---|---|---|---|---|
| 1 | (United States) Gar Robinson | 9 | 1 | **1** | **1** | 1 | 2 | 3 | 2162 | 42 |
| 2 | (Canada) Garett Grist | | 8 | 2 | 2 | 4 | 3 | 1 | 1945 | 31 |
| 3 | (United Kingdom) Matt Bell (Canada) Orey Fidani | 4 | 2 | 5 | 4 | 3 | 5 | 2 | 1882 | 32 |
| 4 | (United Kingdom) Wayne Boyd (Canada) Anthony Mantella | 1 | 4 | 3 | 3 | 5 | 1 | 6 | 1870 | 34 |
| 5 | (Australia) Josh Burdon | 9 | 1 | **1** | | 1 | 2 | 3 | 1777 | 42 |
| 6 | (Brazil) Felipe Fraga | 9 | 1 | **1** | **1** | | | 3 | 1439 | 42 |
| 7 | (Portugal) João Barbosa | **2** | 7 | 7 | 5 | **2** | 6 | | 1415 | 28 |
| 8 | (United States) Dakota Dickerson | 7 | 8 | 2 | | | 8 | 1 | 1213 | 42 |
| 9 | (United States) Lance Willsey | **2** | 7 | 7 | 5 | | 6 | | 1060 | 28 |
| 10 | (United States) Bijoy Garg | | | | | 8 | **4** | 1 | 957 | 14 |
| 11 | (Germany) Lars Kern | 4 | 2 | 5 | | | | 2 | 952 | 32 |
| 12 | (United States) Ari Balogh | | 8 | WD | 2 | 4 | | | 913 | 10 |
| 13 | (Argentina) Nicolás Varrone | 1 | 4 | 3 | | | | 6 | 882 | 34 |
| 14 | (United Kingdom) Till Bechtolsheimer | 5 | 3 | 9 | | | | 4 | 864 | 25 |
| 15 | (United States) Dan Goldburg | | 3 | 9 | | | | 4 | 864 | 17 |
| 16 | (Chile) Nico Pino | **2** | 7 | 7 | | **2** | | | 858 | 28 |
| 17 | (Netherlands) Glenn van Berlo | 9 | **9** | 4 | | | | **7** | 810 | 27 |
| 18 | (Colombia) Gabby Chaves (United States) Jarett Andretti | 7 | **9** | 4 | | | | **7** | 810 | 30 |
| 19 | (Estonia) Tõnis Kasemets (United States) Seth Lucas | | 5 | 6 | | 6 | | | 808 | 10 |
| 20 | (United States) Trenton Estep | | 5 | 6 | | | | | 532 | 10 |
| 21 | (Sweden) Rasmus Lindh | 7 | | 9 | | | | 4 | 532 | 21 |
| 22 | (United States) Christopher Allen | 3 | 6 | 10 | | | | | 485 | 20 |
| 23 | (United States) Jason Rabe | | | 8 | | | 8 | | 485 | 4 |
| 24 | (United States) Connor Bloum | 3 | | 10 | | | 9 | | 458 | 14 |
| 25 | (United States) Nolan Siegel | **2** | | | | | 3 | | 332 | 18 |
| 26 | (Netherlands) Tijmen van der Helm | 5 | 3 | | | | | | 332 | 15 |
| 27 | (United States) Dylan Murry | | | 2 | | | | | 320 | 7 |
| 28 | (Portugal) Guilherme Oliveira | 8 | | | | | 4 | | 315 | 9 |
| 29 | (Australia) Cameron Shields | 3 | | | | | | 5 | 285 | 16 |
| 30 | (United States) Brian Thienes (Canada) Jonathan Woolridge | | | | | | | 5 | 285 | 6 |
| 31 | (Canada) Antoine Comeau (Canada) George Staikos | | | | 6 | | | | 276 | 0 |
| 32 | (United States) Robert Mau (United States) Tristan Nunez | | 6 | | | | | | 275 | 6 |
| 33 | (United States) Kevin Conway (United States) John Geesbreght | | | | | | 7 | | 264 | 0 |
| 34 | (Australia) Scott Andrews (United States) Gerry Kraut | | | | | 7 | | | 263 | 0 |
| 35 | (United Kingdom) Colin Noble | | | | | 8 | | | 262 | 0 |
| 36 | (United States) Alexander Koreiba | | | | | | 9 | | 248 | 0 |
| 37 | (United Kingdom) Stevan McAleer (United States) Andrew Pinkerton | | | 8 | | | | | 230 | 4 |
| 38 | (United States) Alex Kirby | | | 10 | | | | | 210 | 4 |
| 39 | (United States) Thomas Merrill | 1 | | | | | | | 0 | 15 |
| 40 | (United States) John De Angelis | 3 | | | | | | | 0 | 10 |
| 41 | (Germany) Moritz Kranz | 4 | | | | | | | 0 | 8 |
| 42 | (United States) Mason Filippi (United States) Luca Mars | 5 | | | | | | | 0 | 8 |
| 43 | (United States) Nick Boulle (Japan) Yu Kanamaru (Canada) Antonio Serravalle (Canada) James Vance | 6 | | | | | | | 0 | 9 |
| 44 | (Mexico) Sebastián Álvarez (United States) James French (Singapore) Danial Frost | 8 | | | | | | | 0 | 9 |
| Pos. | Drivers | DAY^{‡} | SEB | WGL | MOS | ELK | IMS | ATL | Points | MEC |

‡: Points count towards Michelin Endurance Cup championship only

==== Standings: GT Daytona Pro (GTD Pro) ====
| Pos. | Drivers | DAY | SEB | LBH | LGA | WGL | MOS | LIM | ELK | VIR | IMS | ATL | Points | MEC |
|---|---|---|---|---|---|---|---|---|---|---|---|---|---|---|
| 1 | (United Kingdom) Ben Barnicoat (United Kingdom) Jack Hawksworth | 3 | 2 | **1** | 2 | 1 | **4** | 2 | 2 | **2** | 3 | **8** | 3760 | 37 |
| 2 | (Andorra) Jules Gounon (Spain) Daniel Juncadella | **1** | 3 | 5 | 1 | 4 | 3 | 5 | 5 | 5 | 1 | 1 | 3648 | 42 |
| 3 | (Spain) Antonio García (United States) Jordan Taylor | 2 | **5** | 2 | 4 | 3 | 1 | 4 | 3 | 1 | 5 | 7 | 3579 | 38 |
| 4 | (Austria) Klaus Bachler (France) Patrick Pilet | 5 | 1 | 3 | **3** | 5 | 2 | 3 | 4 | 3 | **4** | 2 | 3578 | 33 |
| 5 | (United Kingdom) Ross Gunn (Spain) Alex Riberas | 7 | 8 | 4 | 5 | 6 | 5 | **1** | **1** | 4 | 2 | 4 | 3427 | 32 |
| 6 | (Italy) Davide Rigon (Brazil) Daniel Serra | 10 | 6 | | | **2** | | | | | | 3 | 1192 | 28 |
| 7 | (South Africa) Jordan Pepper | 4 | 4 | | | 9 | | | | | | 6 | 1137 | 30 |
| 8 | (Germany) Maro Engel | **1** | 3 | | | | | | | | | 1 | 1088 | 38 |
| 9 | (United States) Tommy Milner | 2 | **5** | | | | | | | | | 7 | 915 | 33 |
| 10 | (United Kingdom) David Pittard | 7 | 8 | | | | | | | | | 4 | 837 | 27 |
| 11 | (United States) Bill Auberlen (United States) John Edwards (United States) Chandler Hull | 9 | 7 | | | 7 | | | | | | | 773 | 18 |
| 12 | (Belgium) Laurens Vanthoor | 5 | 1 | | | | | | | | | | 659 | 18 |
| 13 | (United States) Kyle Kirkwood | | 2 | | | | | | | | | **8** | 617 | 17 |
| 14 | (France) Romain Grosjean | 4 | 4 | | | | | | | | | | 612 | 14 |
| 15 | (France) Franck Perera | | 4 | | | | | | | | | 6 | 579 | 15 |
| 16 | (Italy) Mirko Bortolotti | 4 | | | | | | | | | | 6 | 579 | 17 |
| 17 | (Italy) Alessandro Pier Guidi | 10 | | | | | | | | | | 3 | 559 | 15 |
| 18 | (Italy) Andrea Caldarelli | 4 | | | | 9 | | | | | | | 558 | 15 |
| 19 | (United Kingdom) Simon Mann (Spain) Miguel Molina | | | | | 8 | | | | | | 5 | 537 | 10 |
| 20 | (United Kingdom) James Calado | 10 | | | | | | | | | | 5 | 517 | 14 |
| 21 | (United States) Cooper MacNeil | **1** | | | | | | | | | | | 385 | 18 |
| 22 | (France) Kévin Estre | | | | | | | | | | | 2 | 348 | 11 |
| 23 | (United Kingdom) Mike Conway | 3 | | | | | | | | | | | 330 | 11 |
| 24 | (Brazil) Gabriel Casagrande | | 6 | | | | | | | | | | 278 | 7 |
| 25 | (Belgium) Ulysse de Pauw | | | | | 8 | | | | | | | 253 | 4 |
| 26 | (United States) Trenton Estep (United States) Jason Hart (United States) Mark Kvamme (Denmark) Jan Magnussen | 6 | | | | | | | | | | | 250 | 8 |
| 27 | (Canada) Bruno Spengler | 9 | | | | | | | | | | | 245 | 8 |
| 28 | (United States) Ted Giovanis (United States) Hugh Plumb (United States) Matt Plumb (United States) Owen Trinkler | 8 | | | | | | | | | | | 230 | 8 |
| Pos. | Drivers | DAY | SEB | LBH | LGA | WGL | MOS | LIM | ELK | VIR | IMS | ATL | Points | MEC |

==== Standings: GT Daytona (GTD) ====
| Pos. | Drivers | DAY | SEB | LBH | LGA | WGL | MOS | LIM | ELK | VIR | IMS | ATL | Points | WTSC | MEC |
|---|---|---|---|---|---|---|---|---|---|---|---|---|---|---|---|
| 1 | (United States) Bryan Sellers (United States) Madison Snow | 8 | 1 | 1 | 10 | 2 | 1 | 8 | **1** | **1** | **3** | 18 | 3482 | 2355 | 31 |
| 2 | (Canada) Roman De Angelis (Denmark) Marco Sørensen | 1 | 15 | **2** | 8 | 6 | **4** | 1 | 7 | 12 | 4 | **5** | 3221 | 2096 | 36 |
| 3 | (United States) Aaron Telitz (United States) Frankie Montecalvo | 5 | 5 | 3 | 14 | 1 | 6 | 12 | 5 | 5 | 14 | 16 | 2927 | 1789 | 28 |
| 4 | (United States) Robby Foley (United States) Patrick Gallagher | 17 | 2 | 8 | 7 | 13 | 13 | 4 | 12 | 2 | 5 | 2 | 2924 | 1880 | 31 |
| 5 | (Canada) Misha Goikhberg (Italy) Loris Spinelli | 7 | 17 | 7 | 9 | **7** | 14 | 5 | 4 | 13 | 2 | 1 | 2921 | 1855 | 27 |
| 6 | (United States) Brendan Iribe (Denmark) Frederik Schandorff | 3 | 4 | 6 | 5 | 15 | 2 | 13 | 2 | 7 | 16 | 19 | 2853 | 1897 | 27 |
| 7 | (Canada) Mikaël Grenier (United States) Mike Skeen | 15 | 10 | 4 | 15 | 12 | 3 | **10** | 3 | 11 | 9 | 6 | 2773 | 1876 | 39 |
| 8 | (United States) Alan Brynjolfsson (United States) Trent Hindman | 11 | 8 | 10 | 6 | 11 | 7 | 3 | 14 | 9 | 6 | 3 | 2757 | 1768 | 25 |
| 9 | (United States) Alec Udell | 21 | 3 | 13 | **3** | 10 | 12 | 2 | 13 | 14 | 8 | 4 | 2652 | 1712 | 25 |
| 10 | (United States) Russell Ward | 13 | 18 | 5 | 12 | 20 | 10 | 9 | 15 | 3 | 1 | 9 | 2562 | 1855 | 29 |
| 11 | (United Kingdom) Katherine Legge (United States) Sheena Monk | 4 | 12 | 9 | 13 | 5 | 11 | 6 | 10 | 10 | 13 | 15 | 2552 | 1580 | 25 |
| 12 | (United Kingdom) Philip Ellis | 13 | 18 | 5 | 12 | | 10 | 9 | 15 | 3 | 1 | 9 | 2431 | 1855 | 25 |
| 13 | (Netherlands) Kay van Berlo (United States) Alan Metni | 16 | 7 | 12 | 1 | 17 | 9 | 14 | 9 | 8 | 11 | | 2289 | 1708 | 18 |
| 14 | (United Kingdom) Sebastian Priaulx | 14 | 16 | DNS | 11 | 14 | 8 | 7 | 11 | 6 | 10 | 8 | 2245 | 1480 | 24 |
| 15 | (United States) Bill Auberlen (United States) Chandler Hull | | | 11 | 2 | | 5 | 11 | 6 | 4 | 7 | 7 | 2175 | 1907 | 8 |
| 16 | (United States) P. J. Hyett | 14 | 16 | DNS | | 14 | 8 | 7 | 11 | 6 | 10 | 8 | 2015 | 1250 | 24 |
| 17 | (United States) David Brule | 21 | 3 | | | 10 | 12 | | 13 | 14 | 8 | 4 | 1777 | 837 | 25 |
| 18 | (France) Julien Andlauer | 16 | 3 | | **3** | 10 | | 2 | | | | 4 | 1667 | 678 | 25 |
| 19 | (United States) Ashton Harrison | 6 | **19** | DNS | | 8 | | | 8 | | 17 | 14 | 1300 | 431 | 24 |
| 20 | (United States) Andy Lally (United States) John Potter | 2 | 9 | | 4 | 9 | | | | | | 17 | 1264 | 295 | 29 |
| 21 | (Canada) Parker Thompson | 5 | 5 | | | 1 | | | | | | 16 | 1138 | 0 | 28 |
| 22 | (United States) Corey Lewis | 8 | 1 | | | 2 | | | | | | 18 | 1127 | 0 | 31 |
| 23 | (United Kingdom) Ian James | 1 | 15 | | | 6 | | | | | | **5** | 1125 | 0 | 36 |
| 24 | (United States) Ryan Hardwick (Belgium) Jan Heylen (Canada) Zacharie Robichon | 9 | 6 | | | 3 | | | | | | 11 | 1052 | 0 | 26 |
| 25 | (United States) Michael Dinan | 17 | 2 | | | 13 | | | | | | 2 | 1044 | 0 | 31 |
| 26 | (Canada) Kyle Marcelli | 6 | **19** | | | 8 | | | | | 17 | 14 | 1029 | 160 | 24 |
| 27 | (United States) Gunnar Jeannette | 14 | 16 | | 11 | 14 | | | | | | 8 | 995 | 230 | 24 |
| 28 | (United States) Maxwell Root | 11 | 8 | | | 11 | | | | | | 3 | 989 | 0 | 25 |
| 29 | (United States) Marc Miller | 4 | 12 | | | 5 | | | | | | 15 | 972 | 0 | 25 |
| 30 | (United States) Spencer Pumpelly | 2 | 9 | | | 9 | | | | | | 17 | 969 | 0 | 29 |
| 31 | (United Kingdom) Ollie Millroy | 3 | 4 | | | 15 | | | | | | 19 | 956 | 0 | 27 |
| 32 | (United States) Kenton Koch | 15 | 10 | | | 12 | | | | | | 6 | 897 | 0 | 39 |
| 33 | (Costa Rica) Danny Formal | 6 | **19** | | | 8 | | | | | | 14 | 869 | 0 | 24 |
| 34 | (Italy) Alessio Rovera (United States) Charlie Scardina (United States) Onofrio Triarsi | 10 | 20 | | | 4 | | | | | | 10 | 863 | 0 | 24 |
| 35 | (Switzerland) Rahel Frey (Denmark) Michelle Gatting | 18 | 11 | | | 16 | | | | | | 12 | 770 | 0 | 24 |
| 36 | (Netherlands) Indy Dontje | 13 | 18 | | | 20 | | | | | | 9 | 707 | 0 | 29 |
| 37 | (United States) Patrick Liddy | | | | | **7** | | | | | | 1 | 645 | 0 | 13 |
| 38 | (Italy) Antonio Fuoco (Italy) Roberto Lacorte (Italy) Giorgio Sernagiotto | 23 | 14 | | | 18 | | | | | | 13 | 637 | 0 | 27 |
| 39 | (New Zealand) Jaxon Evans | 16 | 7 | | | 17 | | | | | | | 581 | 0 | 18 |
| 40 | (Germany) Mario Farnbacher | 4 | | DNS | | | | | 8 | | | | 579 | 271 | 8 |
| 41 | (United States) Jarett Andretti (Colombia) Gabby Chaves | | | | 16 | | | 15 | | | 12 | | 555 | 555 | 0 |
| 42 | (France) Doriane Pin | 18 | | | | 16 | | | | | | 12 | 550 | 0 | 18 |
| 43 | (Chile) Benjamín Hites | 7 | 17 | | | | | | | | | | 421 | 0 | 14 |
| 44 | (United Kingdom) Darren Turner | 1 | | | | | | | | | | | 375 | 0 | 18 |
| 45 | (Belgium) Sarah Bovy | 18 | 11 | | | | | | | | | | 368 | 0 | 14 |
| 46 | (Denmark) Nicki Thiim | 2 | | | | | | | | | | | 340 | 0 | 11 |
| 47 | (Italy) Francesco Castellacci (United Kingdom) Simon Mann (Spain) Miguel Molina | 19 | 13 | | | | | | | | | | 337 | 0 | 14 |
| 48 | (Germany) Marvin Kirchhöfer | 3 | | | | | | | | | | | 326 | 0 | 11 |
| 49 | (Netherlands) Jeroen Bleekemolen | 21 | | 13 | | | | | | | | | 311 | 197 | 8 |
| 50 | (United States) Kyle Kirkwood | 5 | | | | | | | | | | | 284 | 0 | 8 |
| 51 | (Australia) Ryan Briscoe | 6 | | | | | | | | | | | 280 | 0 | 8 |
| 52 | (United States) Thomas Merrill | | | | | | | | | | | 7 | 268 | 0 | 8 |
| 53 | (United States) Jaden Conwright | 20 | | | | 19 | | | | | | | 265 | 0 | 12 |
| 54 | (Italy) Marco Mapelli | 7 | | | | | | | | | | | 257 | 0 | 8 |
| 55 | (Belgium) Maxime Martin | 8 | | | | | | | | | | | 252 | 0 | 8 |
| 56 | (Norway) Dennis Olsen | 9 | | | | | | | | | | | 239 | 0 | 8 |
| 57 | (Italy) Andrea Bertolini | 10 | | | | | | | | | | | 221 | 0 | 8 |
| 58 | (France) Kévin Estre | 11 | | | | | | | | | | | 215 | 0 | 8 |
| 59 | (Germany) Maximilian Götz | 15 | | | | | | | | | | | 192 | 0 | 13 |
| 60 | (Italy) Raffaele Giammaria (Switzerland) Rolf Ineichen (France) Franck Perera (Italy) Claudio Schiavoni | 12 | | | | | | | | | | | 190 | 0 | 8 |
| 61 | (Canada) Daniel Morad | 13 | | | | | | | | | | | 189 | 0 | 10 |
| 62 | (United Kingdom) Harry Tincknell | 14 | | | | | | | | | | | 182 | 0 | 8 |
| 63 | (Australia) Scott Andrews (United States) Anton Dias Perera | | | | | | | | | | 15 | | 175 | 175 | 0 |
| 64 | (Germany) Jens Klingmann | 17 | | | | | | | | | | | 161 | 0 | 8 |
| 65 | (United States) Luke Berkeley (United States) Rob Ferriol | | | | | 19 | | | | | | | 145 | 0 | 4 |
| 66 | (Argentina) Luis Pérez Companc | 19 | | | | | | | | | | | 136 | 0 | 8 |
| 67 | (Switzerland) Raffaele Marciello | | | | | 20 | | | | | | | 131 | 0 | 4 |
| 68 | (Australia) Kenny Habul (Zimbabwe) Axcil Jefferies (Germany) Fabian Schiller (Germany) Luca Stolz | **22** | | | | | | | | | | | 125 | 0 | 9 |
| 69 | (Italy) Alessio Deledda (China) Kerong Li (United States) Robert Megennis | 20 | | | | | | | | | | | 120 | 0 | 8 |
| 70 | (United States) Andrew Davis | 21 | | | | | | | | | | | 114 | 0 | 8 |
| 71 | (Italy) Alessandro Balzan | 23 | | | | | | | | | | | 103 | 0 | 8 |
| Pos. | Drivers | DAY | SEB | LBH | LGA | WGL | MOS | LIM | ELK | VIR | IMS | ATL | Points | WTSC | MEC |

=== Teams' Championships ===
==== Standings: Grand Touring Prototype (GTP) ====
| Pos. | Team | Car | DAY | SEB | LBH | LGA | WGL | MOS | ELK | IMS | ATL | Points | MEC |
|---|---|---|---|---|---|---|---|---|---|---|---|---|---|
| 1 | #31 Whelen Engineering Racing | Cadillac V-LMDh 1 Cadillac V-Series.R 8 | 5 | **1** | 5 | 3 | 2 | 7 | **6** | 4 | 6 | 2733 | 40 |
| 2 | #10 WTR with Andretti Autosport | Acura ARX-06 | 2 | 4 | **7** | 4 | 6 | 2 | 3 | 5 | **9** | 2712 | 34 |
| 3 | #60 Meyer Shank Racing with Curb-Agajanian | Acura ARX-06 | **1** | 6 | 6 | 6 | 3 | **1** | 2 | 6 | 1 | 2711 | 21 |
| 4 | #6 Porsche Penske Motorsport | Porsche 963 | 8 | 3 | 1 | 2 | **9** | 5 | 7 | 1 | 10 | 2691 | 27 |
| 5 | #7 Porsche Penske Motorsport | Porsche 963 | 7 | 5 | 3 | **9** | 7 | 6 | 1 | **2** | 4 | 2691 | 30 |
| 6 | #25 BMW M Team RLL | BMW M Hybrid V8 | 9 | 2 | 2 | 8 | 1 | 3 | 10 | 3 | 7 | 2687 | 29 |
| 7 | #01 Cadillac Racing | Cadillac V-LMDh 1 Cadillac V-Series.R 8 | 3 | 7 | 8 | 1 | 5 | 9 | 4 | 7 | 2 | 2673 | 38 |
| 8 | #24 BMW M Team RLL | BMW M Hybrid V8 | 6 | 8 | 4 | 5 | 8 | 8 | 9 | 10 | 8 | 2341 | 25 |
| 9 | #5 JDC–Miller MotorSports | Porsche 963 | | | | 7 | 4 | 4 | 5 | 8 | 5 | 1660 | 10 |
| 10 | #59 Proton Competition | Porsche 963 | | | | | | | 8 | 9 | 3 | 814 | 7 |
| 11 | #02 Cadillac Racing | Cadillac V-LMDh | 4 | | | | | | | | | 306 | 9 |
| Pos. | Team | Car | DAY | SEB | LBH | LGA | WGL | MOS | ELK | IMS | ATL | Points | MEC |

==== Standings: Le Mans Prototype 2 (LMP2) ====
| Pos. | Team | Car | DAY‡ | SEB | LGA | WGL | ELK | IMS | ATL | Points | MEC |
|---|---|---|---|---|---|---|---|---|---|---|---|
| 1 | #52 PR1/Mathiasen Motorsports | Oreca 07 | **7** | **4** | 2 | 3 | 1 | **4** | **3** | 1995 | 39 |
| 2 | #04 CrowdStrike Racing by APR | Oreca 07 | 2 | 5 | **3** | 1 | **7** | 3 | 1 | 1958 | 42 |
| 3 | #11 TDS Racing | Oreca 07 | 10 | 2 | 1 | **7** | 3 | 1 | 8 | 1942 | 34 |
| 4 | #35 TDS Racing | Oreca 07 | 4 | 8 | 4 | 4 | 2 | 5 | 2 | 1832 | 33 |
| 5 | #8 Tower Motorsports | Oreca 07 | 5 | 1 | 8 | 5 | 4 | 2 | 7 | 1811 | 30 |
| 6 | #18 Era Motorsport | Oreca 07 | 9 | 3 | 7 | 2 | 6 | 6 | 5 | 1740 | 29 |
| 7 | #20 High Class Racing | Oreca 07 | 8 | 6 | 6 | 8 | 5 | 7 | 6 | 1605 | 24 |
| 8 | #51 Rick Ware Racing | Oreca 07 | 6 | 7 | 5 | 9 | | | | 770 | 18 |
| 9 | #88 AF Corse | Oreca 07 | 3 | | | 6 | | | 4 | 556 | 21 |
| 10 | #55 Proton Competition | Oreca 07 | 1 | | | | | | | 0 | 14 |
| Pos. | Team | Car | DAY‡ | SEB | LGA | WGL | ELK | IMS | ATL | Points | MEC |

‡: Points only awarded towards Michelin Endurance Cup championship

==== Standings: Le Mans Prototype 3 (LMP3) ====
| Pos. | Team | Car | DAY‡ | SEB | WGL | MOS | ELK | IMS | ATL | Points | MEC |
|---|---|---|---|---|---|---|---|---|---|---|---|
| 1 | #74 Riley Motorsports | Ligier JS P320 | 9 | 1 | **1** | **1** | 1 | 2 | 3 | 2162 | 42 |
| 2 | #30 Jr III Motorsports | Ligier JS P320 | | 8 | 2 | 2 | 4 | 3 | 1 | 1945 | 31 |
| 3 | #13 AWA | Duqueine M30 - D-08 | 4 | 2 | 5 | 4 | 3 | 5 | 2 | 1882 | 32 |
| 4 | #17 AWA | Duqueine M30 - D-08 | 1 | 4 | 3 | 3 | 5 | 1 | 6 | 1870 | 34 |
| 5 | #33 Sean Creech Motorsport | Ligier JS P320 | **2** | 7 | 7 | 5 | **2** | 6 | | 1415 | 28 |
| 6 | #4 Ave Motorsports | Ligier JS P320 | | 5 | 6 | 6 | 6 | 7 | | 1348 | 10 |
| 7 | #85 JDC–Miller MotorSports | Duqueine M30 - D-08 | 5 | 3 | 9 | | 7 | | 4 | 1127 | 25 |
| 8 | #38 Performance Tech Motorsports | Ligier JS P320 | 3 | 6 | 10 | | | 9 | 5 | 1018 | 26 |
| 9 | #36 Andretti Autosport | Ligier JS P320 | 7 | **9** | 4 | | | | **7** | 810 | 30 |
| 10 | #29 Jr III Motorsports | Ligier JS P320 | | | | | 8 | **4** | | 577 | 0 |
| 11 | #54 MLT Motorsports | Ligier JS P320 | | | 8 | | | 8 | | 485 | 4 |
| 12 | #87 FastMD Racing | Duqueine M30 - D-08 | 6 | | | | | | | 0 | 9 |
| 13 | #43 MRS GT-Racing | Ligier JS P320 | 8 | | | | | | | 0 | 9 |
| Pos. | Team | Car | DAY‡ | SEB | WGL | MOS | ELK | IMS | ATL | Points | MEC |

‡: Points only awarded towards Michelin Endurance Cup championship

==== Standings: GT Daytona Pro (GTD Pro) ====
| Pos. | Team | Car | DAY | SEB | LBH | LGA | WGL | MOS | LIM | ELK | VIR | IMS | ATL | Points | MEC |
|---|---|---|---|---|---|---|---|---|---|---|---|---|---|---|---|
| 1 | #14 Vasser Sullivan | Lexus RC F GT3 | 3 | 2 | **1** | 2 | 1 | **4** | 2 | 2 | **2** | 3 | **8** | 3760 | 37 |
| 2 | #79 WeatherTech Racing | Mercedes-AMG GT3 Evo | **1** | 3 | 5 | 1 | 4 | 3 | 5 | 5 | 5 | 1 | 1 | 3648 | 42 |
| 3 | #3 Corvette Racing | Chevrolet Corvette C8.R GTD | 2 | **5** | 2 | 4 | 3 | 1 | 4 | 3 | 1 | 5 | 7 | 3579 | 38 |
| 4 | #9 Pfaff Motorsports | Porsche 911 GT3 R (992) | 5 | 1 | 3 | **3** | 5 | 2 | 3 | 4 | 3 | **4** | 2 | 3578 | 33 |
| 5 | #23 Heart of Racing Team | Aston Martin Vantage AMR GT3 | 7 | 8 | 4 | 5 | 6 | 5 | **1** | **1** | 4 | 2 | 4 | 3427 | 32 |
| 6 | #62 Risi Competizione | Ferrari 296 GT3 | 10 | 6 | | | **2** | | | | | | 3 | 1192 | 28 |
| 7 | #63 Iron Lynx | Lamborghini Huracán GT3 Evo 2 | 4 | 4 | | | 9 | | | | | | 6 | 1137 | 30 |
| 8 | #95 Turner Motorsport | BMW M4 GT3 | 9 | 7 | | | 7 | | | | | | | 773 | 18 |
| 9 | #61 AF Corse | Ferrari 296 GT3 | | | | | 8 | | | | | | 5 | 537 | 10 |
| 10 | #53 MDK Motorsports | Porsche 911 GT3 R (992) | 6 | | | | | | | | | | | 250 | 8 |
| 11 | #64 TGM/TF Sport | Aston Martin Vantage AMR GT3 | 8 | | | | | | | | | | | 230 | 8 |
| Pos. | Team | Car | DAY | SEB | LBH | LGA | WGL | MOS | LIM | ELK | VIR | IMS | ATL | Points | MEC |

==== Standings: GT Daytona (GTD) ====
| Pos. | Team | Car | DAY | SEB | LBH | LGA | WGL | MOS | LIM | ELK | VIR | IMS | ATL | Points | WTSC | MEC |
|---|---|---|---|---|---|---|---|---|---|---|---|---|---|---|---|---|
| 1 | #1 Paul Miller Racing | BMW M4 GT3 | 8 | 1 | 1 | 10 | 2 | 1 | 8 | **1** | **1** | **3** | 18 | 3482 | 2355 | 31 |
| 2 | #27 Heart of Racing Team | Aston Martin Vantage AMR GT3 | 1 | 15 | **2** | 8 | 6 | **4** | 1 | 7 | 12 | 4 | **5** | 3221 | 2096 | 36 |
| 3 | #12 Vasser Sullivan | Lexus RC F GT3 | 5 | 5 | 3 | 14 | 1 | 6 | 12 | 5 | 5 | 14 | 16 | 2927 | 1789 | 28 |
| 4 | #96 Turner Motorsport | BMW M4 GT3 | 17 | 2 | 8 | 7 | 13 | 13 | 4 | 12 | 2 | 5 | 2 | 2924 | 1880 | 31 |
| 5 | #78 Forte Racing powered by US RaceTronics | Lamborghini Huracán GT3 Evo 2 | 7 | 17 | 7 | 9 | **7** | 14 | 5 | 4 | 13 | 2 | 1 | 2921 | 1855 | 27 |
| 6 | #70 Inception Racing | McLaren 720S GT3 1 McLaren 720S GT3 Evo 10 | 3 | 4 | 6 | 5 | 15 | 2 | 13 | 2 | 7 | 16 | 19 | 2853 | 1897 | 27 |
| 7 | #32 / Team Korthoff Motorsports; #32 / Korthoff Preston Motorsports | Mercedes-AMG GT3 Evo | 15 | 10 | 4 | 15 | 12 | 3 | **10** | 3 | 11 | 9 | 6 | 2773 | 1876 | 39 |
| 8 | #77 Wright Motorsports | Porsche 911 GT3 R (992) | 11 | 8 | 10 | 6 | 11 | 7 | 3 | 14 | 9 | 6 | 3 | 2757 | 1768 | 25 |
| 9 | #92 Kelly-Moss with Riley | Porsche 911 GT3 R (992) | 21 | 3 | 13 | **3** | 10 | 12 | 2 | 13 | 14 | 8 | 4 | 2652 | 1712 | 25 |
| 10 | #57 Winward Racing | Mercedes-AMG GT3 Evo | 13 | 18 | 5 | 12 | 20 | 10 | 9 | 15 | 3 | 1 | 9 | 2562 | 1855 | 20 |
| 11 | #66 Gradient Racing | Acura NSX GT3 Evo22 | 4 | 12 | 9 | 13 | 5 | 11 | 6 | 10 | 10 | 13 | 15 | 2552 | 1580 | 25 |
| 12 | #91 Kelly-Moss with Riley | Porsche 911 GT3 R (992) | 16 | 7 | 12 | 1 | 17 | 9 | 14 | 9 | 8 | 11 | | 2289 | 1708 | 18 |
| 13 | #80 AO Racing Team | Porsche 911 GT3 R (992) | 14 | 16 | DNS | 11 | 14 | 8 | 7 | 11 | 6 | 10 | 8 | 2245 | 1480 | 24 |
| 14 | #97 Turner Motorsport | BMW M4 GT3 | | | 11 | 2 | | 5 | 11 | 6 | 4 | 7 | 7 | 2175 | 1907 | 8 |
| 15 | #93 Racers Edge Motorsports with WTR Andretti | Acura NSX GT3 Evo22 | 6 | **19** | DNS | | 8 | | | 8 | | 17 | 14 | 1300 | 431 | 24 |
| 16 | #44 Magnus Racing | Aston Martin Vantage AMR GT3 | 2 | 9 | | 4 | 9 | | | | | | 17 | 1264 | 295 | 29 |
| 17 | #16 Wright Motorsports | Porsche 911 GT3 R (992) | 9 | 6 | | | 3 | | | | | | 11 | 1052 | 0 | 26 |
| 18 | #023 Triarsi Competizione | Ferrari 296 GT3 | 10 | 20 | | | 4 | | | | | | 10 | 863 | 0 | 24 |
| 19 | #83 Iron Dames | Lamborghini Huracán GT3 Evo 2 | 18 | 11 | | | 16 | | | | | | 12 | 770 | 0 | 24 |
| 20 | #47 Cetilar Racing | Ferrari 296 GT3 | 23 | 14 | | | 18 | | | | | | 13 | 637 | 0 | 27 |
| 21 | #94 Andretti Autosport | Aston Martin Vantage AMR GT3 | | | | 16 | | | 15 | | | 12 | | 555 | 555 | 0 |
| 22 | #21 AF Corse | Ferrari 296 GT3 | 19 | 13 | | | | | | | | | | 337 | 0 | 14 |
| 23 | #42 NTE Sport | Lamborghini Huracán GT3 Evo 2 | 20 | | | | 19 | | | | | | | 265 | 0 | 12 |
| 24 | #19 Iron Lynx | Lamborghini Huracán GT3 Evo 2 | 12 | | | | | | | | | | | 190 | 0 | 8 |
| 25 | #15 Lone Star Racing | Mercedes-AMG GT3 Evo | | | | | | | | | | 15 | | 175 | 175 | 0 |
| 26 | #75 SunEnergy1 Racing | Mercedes-AMG GT3 Evo | **22** | | | | | | | | | | | 125 | 0 | 9 |
| Pos. | Team | Car | DAY | SEB | LBH | LGA | WGL | MOS | LIM | ELK | VIR | IMS | ATL | Points | WTSC | MEC |

=== Manufacturers' Championships ===
==== Standings: Grand Touring Prototype (GTP) ====
| Pos. | Manufacturer | DAY | SEB | LBH | LGA | WGL | MOS | ELK | IMS | ATL | Points | MEC |
|---|---|---|---|---|---|---|---|---|---|---|---|---|
| 1 | (United States) Cadillac | 3 | **1** | 5 | 1 | 2 | 7 | **4** | 4 | 2 | 3096 | 53 |
| 2 | (Germany) Porsche | 7 | 3 | 1 | **2** | **4** | 4 | 1 | **1** | 3 | 3080 | 37 |
| 3 | (Japan) Acura | **1** | 4 | **6** | 4 | 3 | **1** | 2 | 5 | **1** | 3076 | 46 |
| 4 | (Germany) BMW | 6 | 2 | 2 | 5 | 1 | 3 | 9 | 3 | 7 | 2998 | 32 |
| Pos. | Manufacturer | DAY | SEB | LBH | LGA | WGL | MOS | ELK | IMS | ATL | Points | MEC |

==== Standings: GT Daytona Pro (GTD Pro) ====
| Pos. | Manufacturer | DAY | SEB | LBH | LGA | WGL | MOS | LIM | ELK | VIR | IMS | ATL | Points | MEC |
|---|---|---|---|---|---|---|---|---|---|---|---|---|---|---|
| 1 | (Japan) Lexus | 3 | 2 | **1** | 2 | 1 | **4** | 2 | 2 | **2** | 3 | **8** | 3770 | 37 |
| 2 | (Germany) Mercedes-AMG | **1** | 3 | 5 | 1 | 4 | 3 | 5 | 5 | 5 | 1 | 1 | 3648 | 42 |
| 3 | (United States) Chevrolet | 2 | **5** | 2 | 4 | 3 | 1 | 4 | 3 | 1 | 5 | 7 | 3589 | 38 |
| 4 | (Germany) Porsche | 5 | 1 | 3 | **3** | 5 | 2 | 3 | 4 | 3 | **4** | 2 | 3578 | 33 |
| 5 | (United Kingdom) Aston Martin | 7 | 8 | 4 | 5 | 6 | 5 | **1** | **1** | 4 | 2 | 4 | 3438 | 32 |
| 6 | (Italy) Ferrari | 10 | 6 | | | **2** | | | | | | 3 | 1212 | 28 |
| 7 | (Italy) Lamborghini | 4 | 4 | | | 9 | | | | | | 6 | 1158 | 30 |
| 8 | (Germany) BMW | 9 | 7 | | | 7 | | | | | | | 793 | 18 |
| Pos. | Manufacturer | DAY | SEB | LBH | LGA | WGL | MOS | LIM | ELK | VIR | IMS | ATL | Points | MEC |

==== Standings: Grand Touring Daytona (GTD) ====
| Pos. | Manufacturer | DAY | SEB | LBH | LGA | WGL | MOS | LIM | ELK | VIR | IMS | ATL | Points | WTSC | MEC |
|---|---|---|---|---|---|---|---|---|---|---|---|---|---|---|---|
| 1 | (Germany) BMW | 8 | 1 | 1 | 2 | 2 | 1 | 4 | **1** | **1** | **3** | 2 | 3888 | 2540 | 40 |
| 2 | (United Kingdom) Aston Martin | 1 | 9 | **2** | 4 | 6 | **4** | 1 | 7 | 12 | 4 | **5** | 3484 | 2230 | 37 |
| 3 | (Germany) Porsche | 9 | 3 | 10 | **1** | 3 | 7 | 2 | 9 | 6 | 6 | 3 | 3334 | 2097 | 29 |
| 4 | (Germany) Mercedes-AMG | **13** | 10 | 4 | 12 | 12 | 3 | **9** | 3 | 3 | 1 | 6 | 3326 | 2257 | 42 |
| 5 | (Japan) Lexus | 5 | 5 | 3 | 14 | 1 | 6 | 12 | 5 | 5 | 14 | 16 | 3289 | 2029 | 29 |
| 6 | (United Kingdom) McLaren | 3 | 4 | 6 | 5 | 15 | 2 | 13 | 2 | 11 | 16 | 19 | 3253 | 2090 | 30 |
| 7 | (Italy) Lamborghini | 7 | 11 | 7 | 9 | **7** | 14 | 5 | 4 | 13 | 2 | 1 | 3247 | 2043 | 27 |
| 8 | (Japan) Acura | 4 | **12** | 9 | 13 | 5 | 11 | 6 | 8 | 10 | 13 | 14 | 3030 | 1885 | 27 |
| 9 | (Italy) Ferrari | 10 | 13 | | | 4 | | | | | | 10 | 1077 | 0 | 27 |
| Pos. | Manufacturer | DAY | SEB | LBH | LGA | WGL | MOS | LIM | ELK | VIR | IMS | ATL | Points | WTSC | MEC |
