= Dan Goldburg =

American racing driver (born 1978)

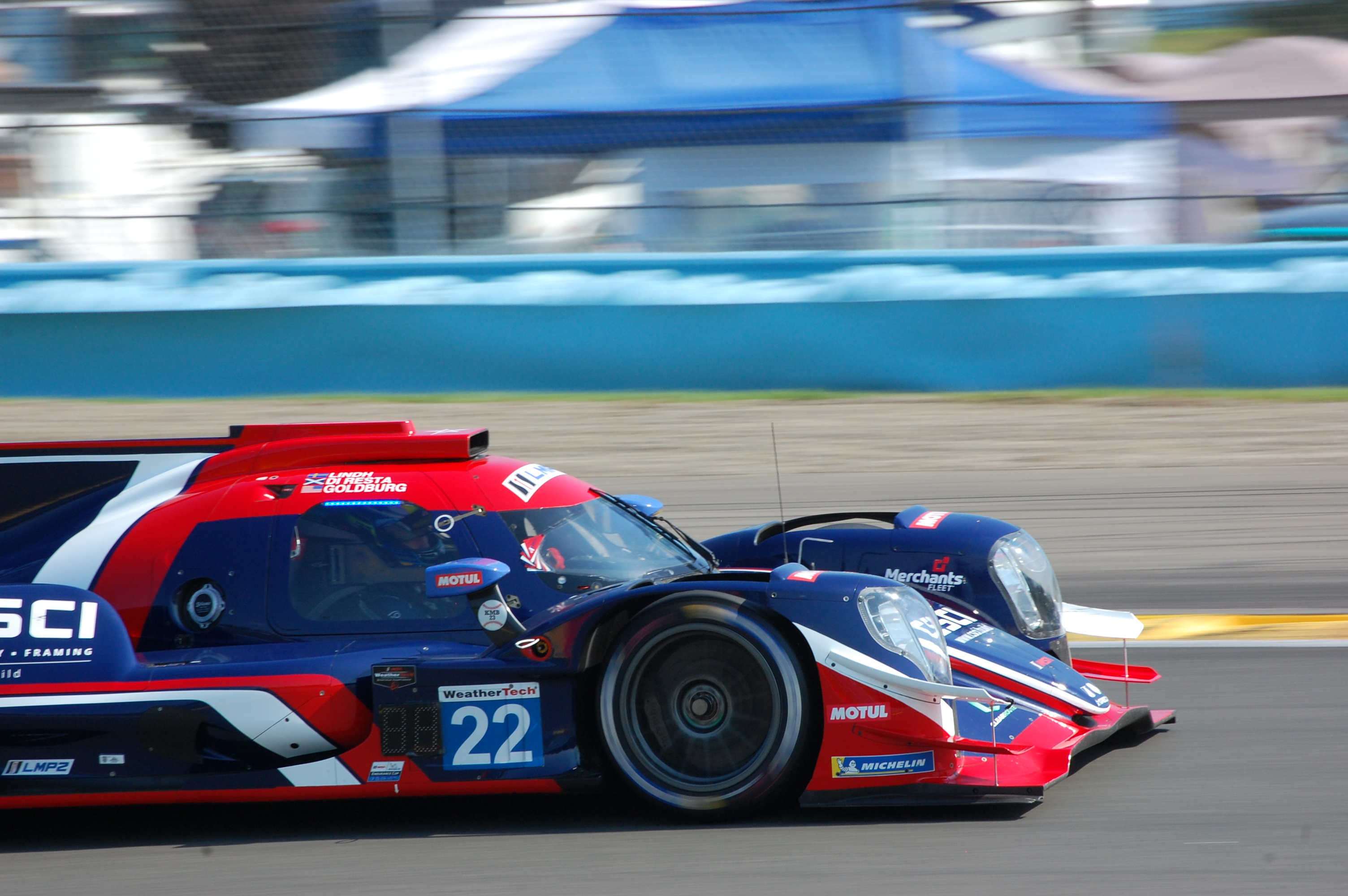
- Goldburg in 2025
- Nationality: (United States) American
- Born: May 11, 1978 (age 48) Delray Beach, Florida, U.S.

IMSA SportsCar Championship career
- Debut season: 2021
- Current team: United Autosports USA
- Categorisation: FIA Bronze
- Car number: 22
- Former teams: Tower Motorsports; JDC–Miller MotorSports; Performance Tech Motorsports
- Starts: 35
- Wins: 2
- Podiums: 11
- Poles: 4
- Fastest laps: 0
- Best finish: 3rd in 2025 (LMP2)

Previous series
- 2023 2010–2013, 2020–2022: IMSA VP Racing SportsCar Challenge; IMSA Prototype Challenge

Championship titles
- 2023 2019: IMSA VP Racing SportsCar Challenge – LMP3 Bronze; NASA National Championships – Spec E30

Daniel Goldburg (born May 11, 1978) is an American businessman and racing driver who competes in the LMP2 class of the IMSA SportsCar Championship for Inter Europol Competition.

== Business ventures ==
Goldburg is the president and owner of CSCI, a structural shell contractor company founded by his father Ronald in 1993.

== Racing career ==
Goldburg began club racing in 2001, before joining Performance Tech seven years later as a simulator driver to practice for his debut in IMSA Prototype Lites. In 2010, Goldburg made his series debut for the team, racing at the Road Atlanta finale in the Lites 1 class. Continuing in the series on a part-time basis for the following two seasons, Goldburg won at Daytona in 2011 and finished 10th in points in both, before going full-time in 2013. Goldburg won the season opener at Sebring and scored five other podiums to finish fourth in the Lites 1 points.

Goldburg returned to racing in 2018 in the NASA National Championships, and clinched the Spec E30 title in 2019. Towards the end of that year, Goldburg reunited with Performance Tech Motorsports to race in the LMP3 class of the non-championship IMSA Michelin Encore. In 2020, Goldburg joined the team in the now-renamed IMSA Prototype Challenge. Racing alongside Rasmus Lindh for most of the six-race season, Goldburg took a best result of second at Road America, as he ended the year fourth in the overall standings.

In 2021, Goldburg stayed at Performance Tech for another campaign in the IMSA Prototype Challenge, as well as a part-time effort in the LMP3 class of the premier IMSA SportsCar Championship. In the former, Goldburg and Lindh took an overall win at VIR and two other podiums to once again end the year fourth in the LMP3-1 class points. In the latter, Goldburg scored a pole and a pair of second-place finishes at Mid-Ohio and Road America to take seventh in the LMP3 standings. Returning for a similar dual campaign in 2022, Goldburg found more success in the WeatherTech series, in which he took third at Sebring and Watkins Glen.

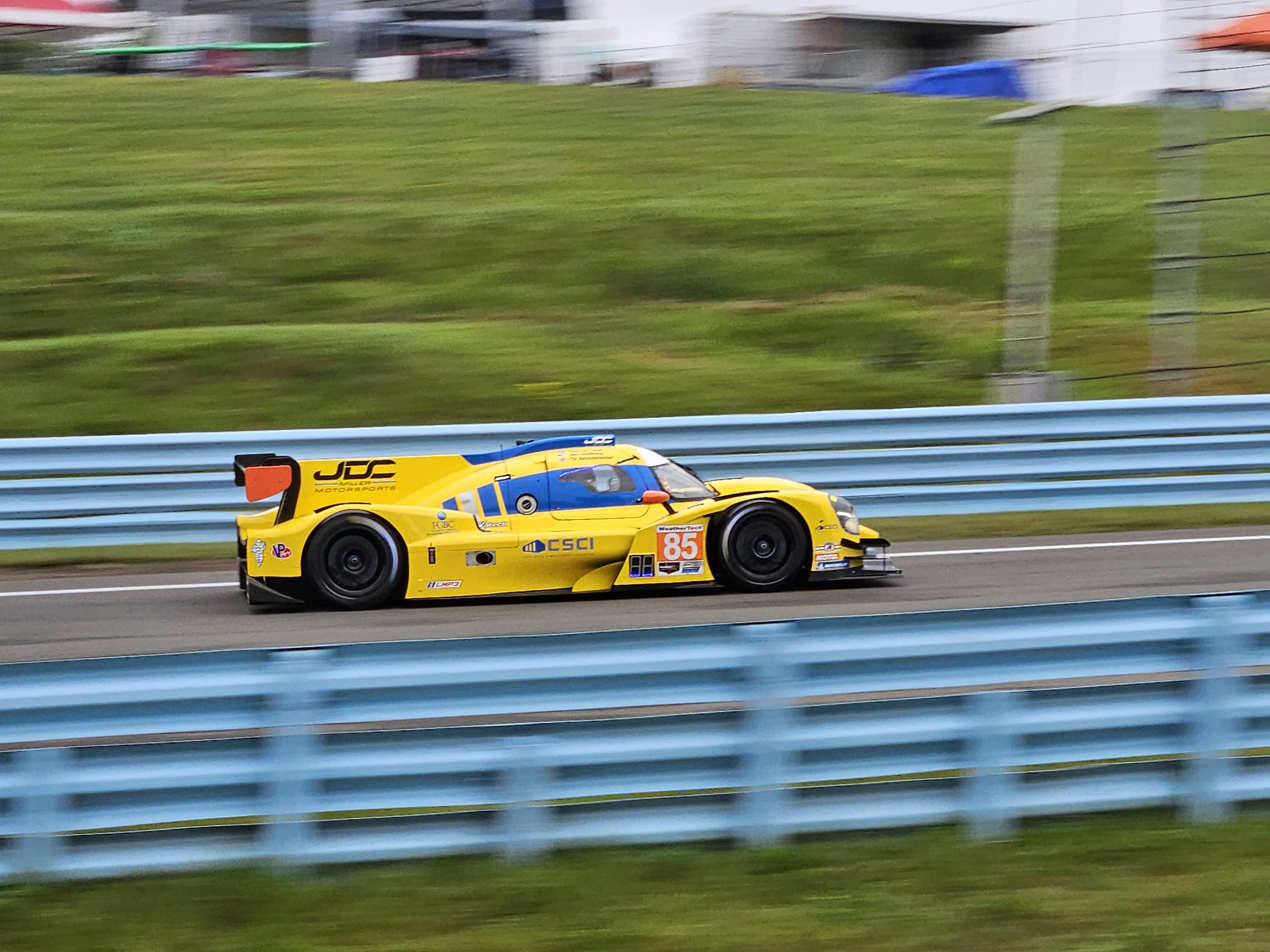
Goldburg's JDC–Miller Duqueine D08 LMP3 at Watkins Glen in 2023.

In 2023, Goldburg moved to JDC MotorSports to compete in the new IMSA VP Racing SportsCar Challenge. Driving solo, Goldburg won both races at Daytona, beating several silver-rated drivers, before taking a further win at Mosport and seven other podiums to secure the Bronze title and runner-up honors overall in LMP3, behind Bijoy Garg. During 2023, Goldburg also made cameos in the IMSA SportsCar Championship, finishing third in LMP3 at the 12 Hours of Sebring for JDC–Miller, and second on his LMP2 debut at Indianapolis for Tower Motorsports.

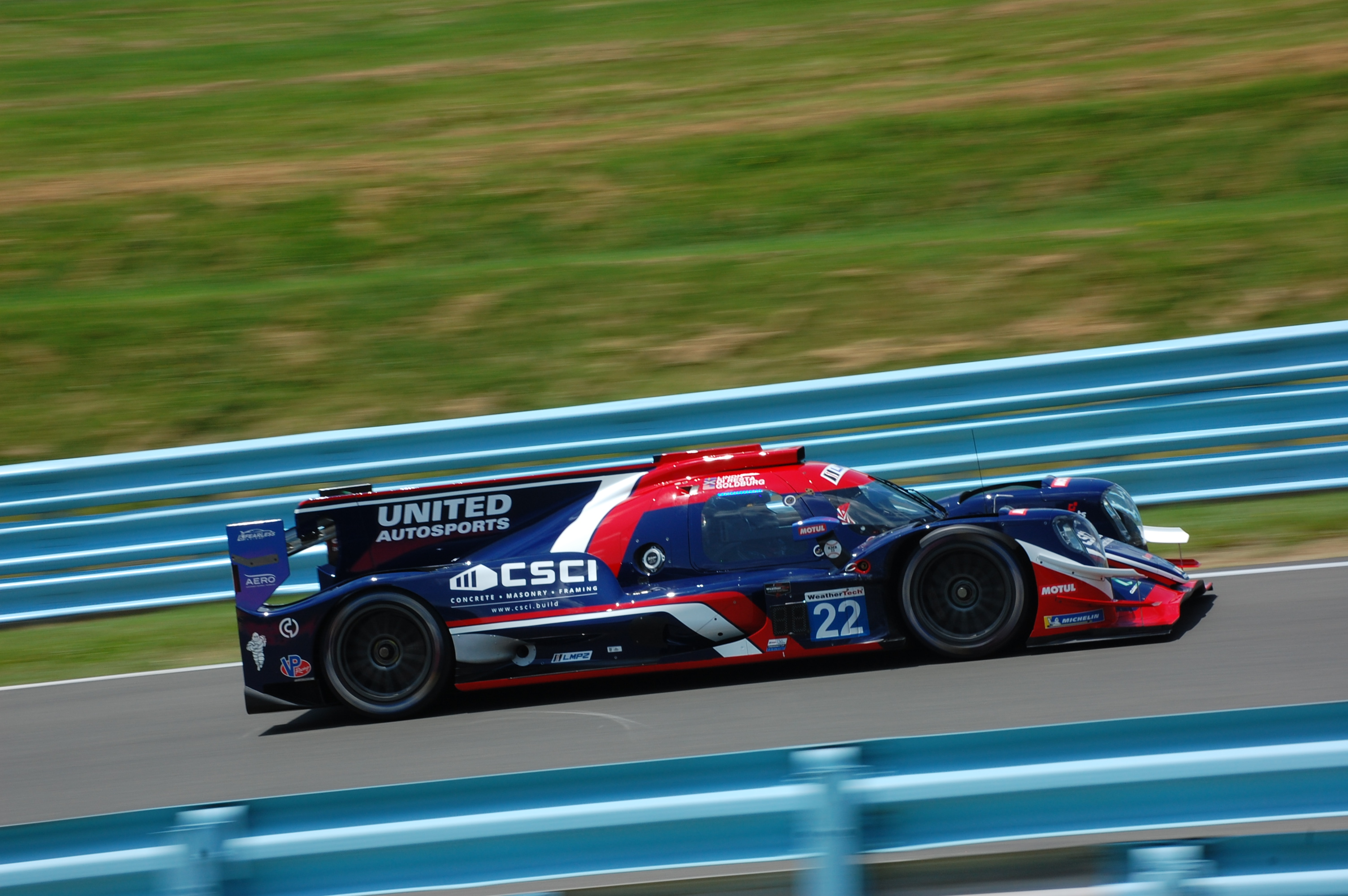
Goldburg's United Autosports Oreca 07 LMP2 at Watkins Glen in 2025.

Moving to United Autosports USA for his first full-time IMSA WeatherTech season in LMP2 in 2024, Goldburg took a best result of third at the 12 Hours of Sebring with Paul di Resta and Garg to end the year seventh in points. Continuing with United for 2025, Goldburg took a breakthrough pole position at the 24 Hours of Daytona, inherited the LMP2 win with Di Resta, Lindh and James Allen after the Tower car was disqualified, and won again at the Six Hours of the Glen to take third in the standings.

Staying put for 2026, sharing United Autosports's No. 22 Oreca 07 with Di Resta and Lindh, Goldburg began the year by finishing second at the 12 Hours of Sebring and qualifying on pole at Road America. After that, Goldburg took pole at Road America and finished third at Indianapolis to take third in the LMP2 standings. During 2026, Goldburg made a brief return to LMP3 competition, winning the Road to Le Mans for M Racing in LMP3 Pro-Am alongside Wayne Boyd, before the car was disqualified post-race.

The following year, Goldburg remained in IMSA, but switched to Inter Europol Competition for his fourth full season in LMP2 competition.

== Racing record ==
=== Racing career summary ===
Season	Series	Team	Races	Wins	Poles	F/Laps	Podiums	Points	Position
2010	IMSA Prototype Lites – Lites 1	Performance Tech	2	0	0	0	0	15	22nd
2011	IMSA Prototype Lites – Lites 1	Performance Tech	6	1	0	0	1	58	10th
2012	IMSA Prototype Lites – Lites 1	Performance Tech	6	0	0	0	2	81	10th
2013	IMSA Prototype Lites – Lites 1	Performance Tech	14	1	1	0	6	149	4th
2018	NASA National Championships – Spec E30								
2019	NASA National Championships – Spec E30								1st
2019	IMSA Michelin Encore – LMP3	Performance Tech Motorsports	1	0	0	0	0	—N/a	6th
2020	IMSA Prototype Challenge	Performance Tech Motorsports	6	0	0	0	3	150	4th
2021	IMSA Prototype Challenge – LMP3-1	Performance Tech Motorsports	6	1	0	0	3	1540	4th
2021	IMSA SportsCar Championship – LMP3	Performance Tech Motorsports	5	0	2	0	2	1495	7th
2021	NASA National Championships – SU								
2022	IMSA Prototype Challenge	Performance Tech Motorsports	4	0	0	0	0	830	13th
2022	IMSA SportsCar Championship – LMP3	Performance Tech Motorsports	5	0	0	0	2	1152	12th
2023	IMSA VP Racing SportsCar Challenge – LMP3	JDC MotorSports	12	3	1	1	10	3790	2nd
2023	IMSA SportsCar Championship – LMP3	JDC–Miller MotorSports	3	0	0	0	1	864	15th
2023	IMSA SportsCar Championship – LMP2	Tower Motorsports	1	0	0	0	1	346	23rd
2024	IMSA SportsCar Championship – LMP2	United Autosports USA	7	0	0	0	1	1884	7th
2025	IMSA SportsCar Championship – LMP2	United Autosports USA	7	2	1	0	3	2117	3rd
2026	IMSA SportsCar Championship – LMP2	United Autosports USA	7	0	1	0	2	2127	3rd
2026	Le Mans Cup – LMP3 Pro-Am	M Racing	1	0	0	0	0	0	NC†
2027	IMSA SportsCar Championship – LMP2	Inter Europol Competition							

^{†} As Goldburg was a guest driver, he was ineligible to score points.

=== Complete IMSA SportsCar Championship results ===
Year	Entrant	Class	Chassis	Engine	1	2	3	4	5	6	7	Rank	Points
2021	Performance Tech Motorsports	LMP3	Ligier JS P320	Nissan VK56DE 5.6 L V8	DAY	SEB; 7	MDO; 2	WGL; 7	WGL	ELK; 2	PET; 9	7th	1495
2022	Performance Tech Motorsports	LMP3	Ligier JS P320	Nissan VK56DE 5.6 L V8	DAY; 7	SEB; 3	MDO; 7	WGL; 3	MOS	ELK	ATL; 8	12th	1152
2023	JDC–Miller MotorSports	LMP3	Duqueine M30 - D08	Nissan VK56DE 5.6 L V8	DAY	SEB; 3	WGL; 9	MOS	ELK		PET; 4	15th	864
2023	Tower Motorsports	LMP2	Oreca 07	Gibson GK428 4.2 L V8						IMS; 2		23rd	346
2024	United Autosports USA	LMP2	Oreca 07	Gibson GK428 4.2 L V8	DAY; 11	SEB; 3	WGL; 5	MOS; 5	ELK; 11	IMS; 7	ATL; 9	7th	1884
2025	United Autosports USA	LMP2	Oreca 07	Gibson GK428 4.2 L V8	DAY; 1	SEB; 8	WGL; 1	MOS; 2	ELK; 14	IMS; 4	PET; 11	3rd	2117
2026	United Autosports USA	LMP2	Oreca 07	Gibson GK428 4.2 L V8	DAY; 4	SEB; 2	WGL; 5	MOS; 5	ELK; 7	IMS; 3	PET; 6	3rd	2127

^{*} Season still in progress.
