= Dylan Murry =

American racing driver (born 2000)

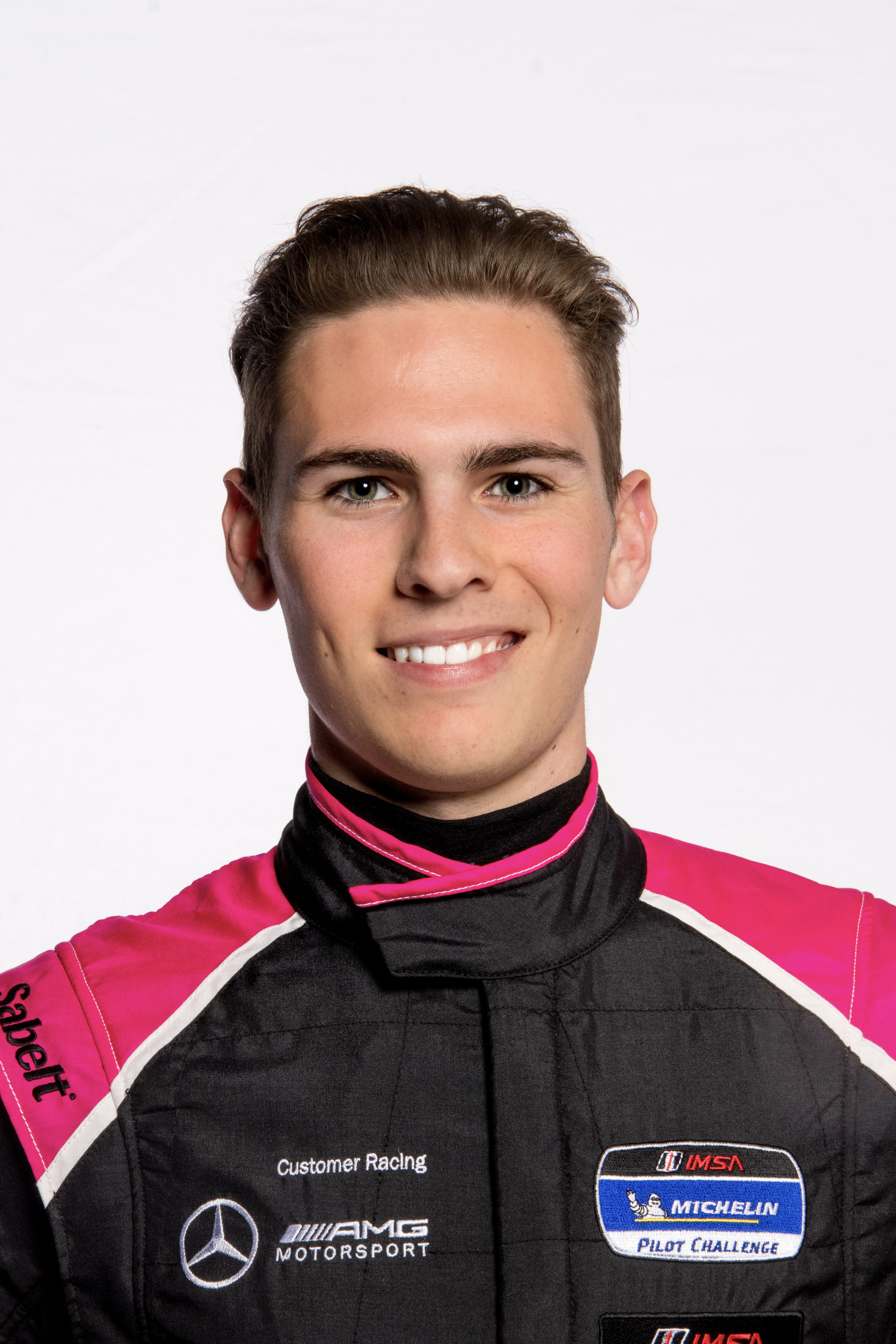
- Murry in 2022
- Nationality: (United States) American
- Born: 17 September 2000 (age 26) Cumming, Georgia, U.S.
- Relatives: David Murry (father)
- Categorisation: FIA Silver

Dylan Murry (born 17 September 2000) is an American racing driver currently competing in the LMP2 class of the IMSA SportsCar Championship for AF Corse USA.

== Personal life ==
Murry is the son of David Murry, an IMSA veteran who took class podiums at the 24 Hours of Le Mans in 2000 and 2011.

== Career ==
Murry began karting in 2005, in which he most notably won the 2010 Andretti Pro Cup Karting League, before taking the GSKA and Southeastern Division titles in 2012 and 2013. Moving to legends cars during his final year of karting in 2013, Murry most notably won the 2014–15 Legends Atlanta Motor Speedway Championship during his five-year stint in the category. In 2016, Murry beat out Skylar Robinson and Kenton Koch to win the Gorsline Scholarship.

The following year, Murry made his NASCAR K&N Pro Series East debut at Watkins Glen for Rette Jones Racing, in which he finished eighth. Moving to sportscars for 2018, Murry joined Porsche-fielding BGB Motorsports to race in the Grand Sport class of the Continental Tire SportsCar Challenge alongside James Cox and was also joined by his father david at Daytona. Racing on a part-time schedule, Murry scored a best result of 12th at Sebring to end the year 34th in points.

Continuing in the newly-renamed Michelin Pilot Challenge for 2019, Murry switched to Mercedes-affiliated Wynn's - Riley Motorsports for his sophomore season in the series. In his first full season, Murry took a lone at Watkins Glen and finished second at Mid-Ohio en route to a sixth-place points finish. In parallel, Murry raced in all but one round of the IMSA Prototype Challenge for MLT Motorsports, scoring his only win of the season at Mid-Ohio to end the year fifth in points. During 2019, Murry also made a one-off return to the NASCAR K&N Pro Series East at Watkins Glen for Jefferson Pitts Racing, in which he finished sixth. Towards the end of the year, Murry won the IMSA Michelin Encore for Riley Motorsports in GT4.

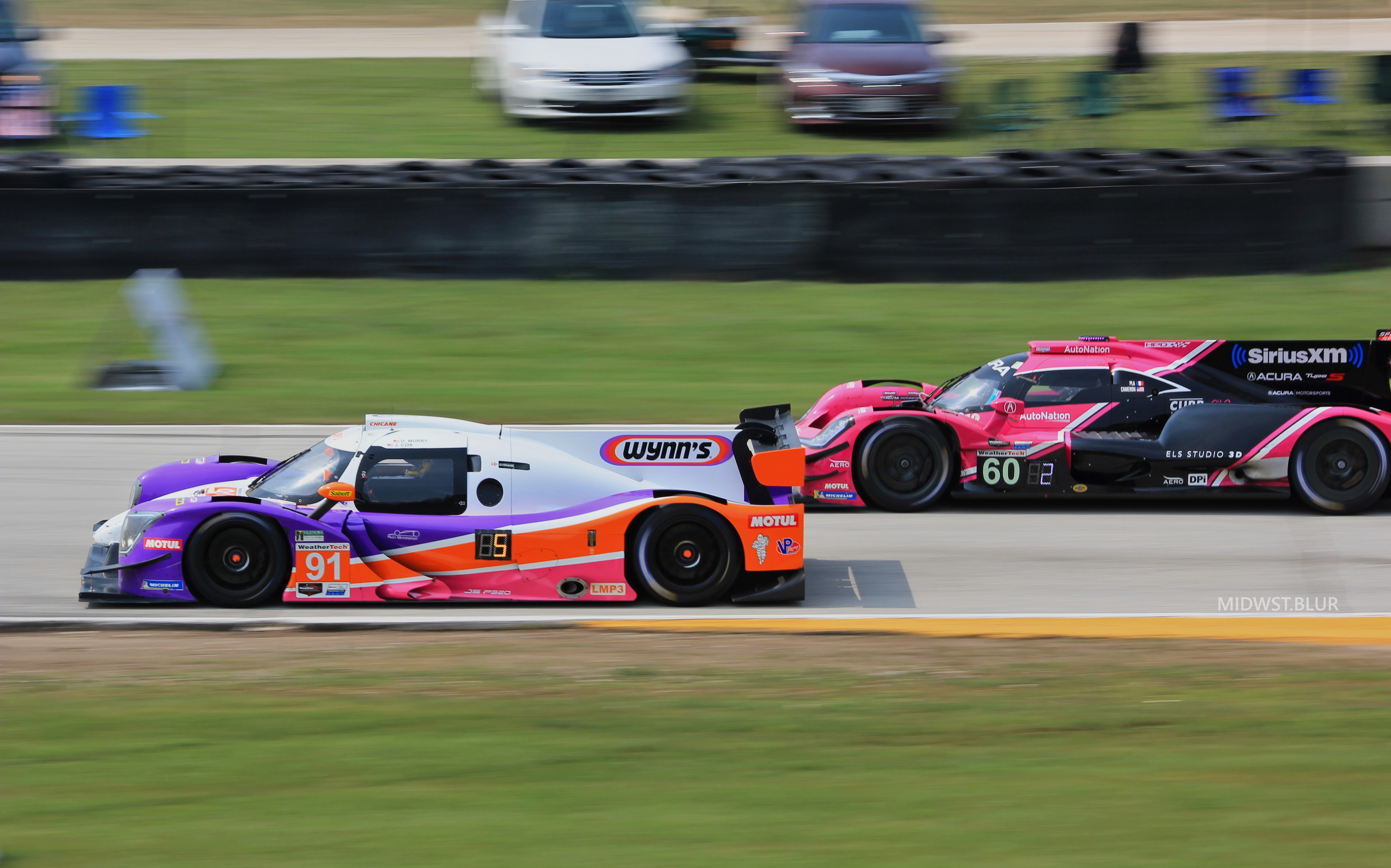
Murry (left) in his Wynn's-liveried Riley Motorsports LMP3, getting lapped by a DPi at Road America in 2021.

Remaining with Riley Motorsports to continue in the former series for the following year, Murry won at Daytona and scored a pair of second-place finishes at VIR and Mid-Ohio to secure a third-place points finish in the Grand Sport class. During 2020, Murry also raced with the team for a one-off cameo in the IMSA Prototype Challenge, as well as returning to BGB Motorsports for the Indianapolis 8 Hours in GT4. Staying with Riley for 2021, Murry returned to LMP3 competition as he made his debut in the IMSA SportsCar Championship. In his first full season in the series, Murry scored a best result of second at the 12 Hours of Sebring and the second Watkins Glen race, as well as three third-place finishes to round out the year third in the LMP3 standings. In parallel, Murry raced in Porsche Carrera Cup North America for BGB Motorsports, scoring a best result of fifth four times en route to a seventh-place points finish in the Pro standings. At the end of the year, Murry participated in the FIA World Endurance Championship rookie test in Bahrain, driving D'station Racing's No. 777 Aston Martin Vantage.

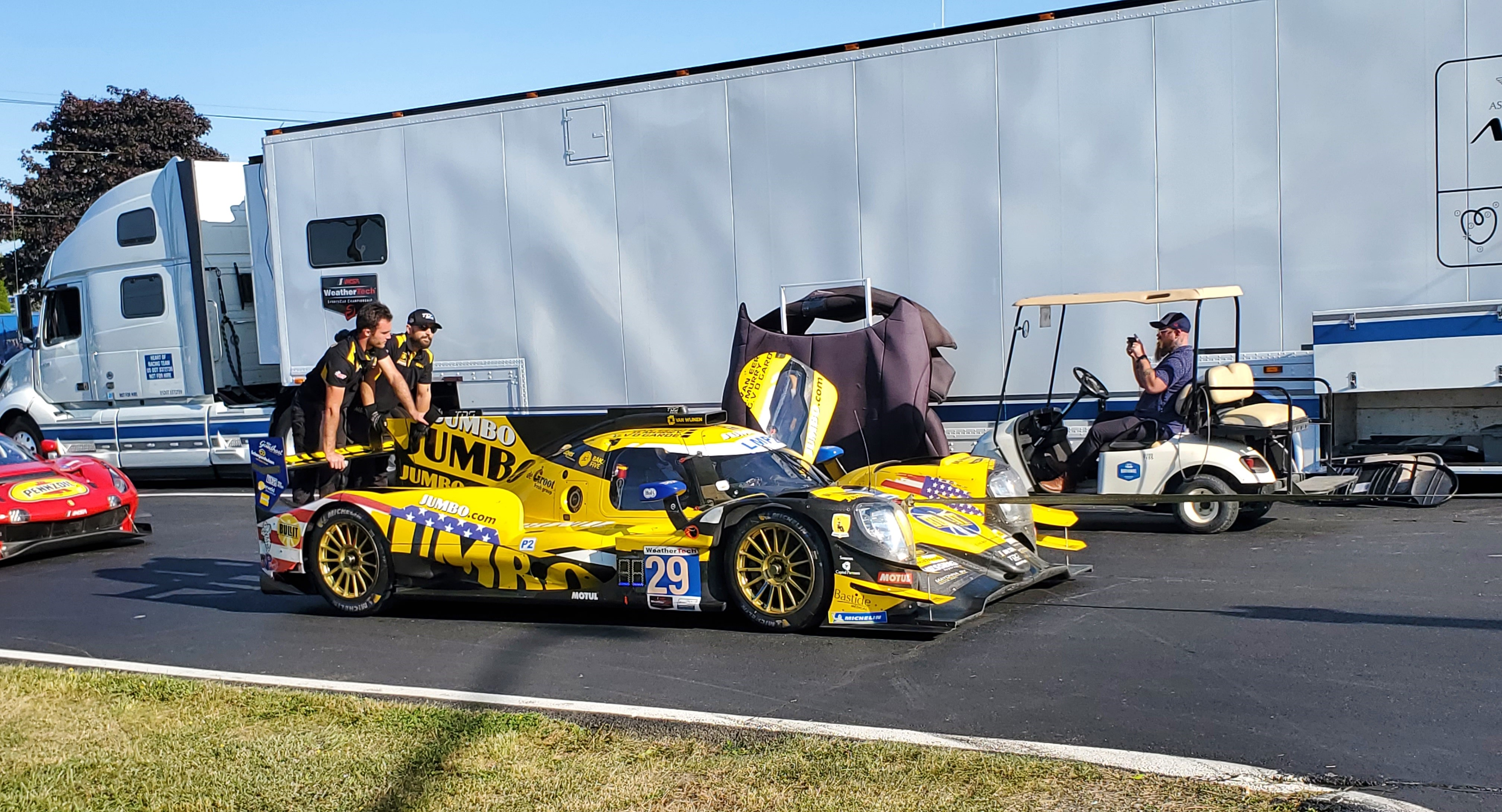
Murry made his LMP2 debut in 2022 for the Jumbo-backed Racing Team Nederland.

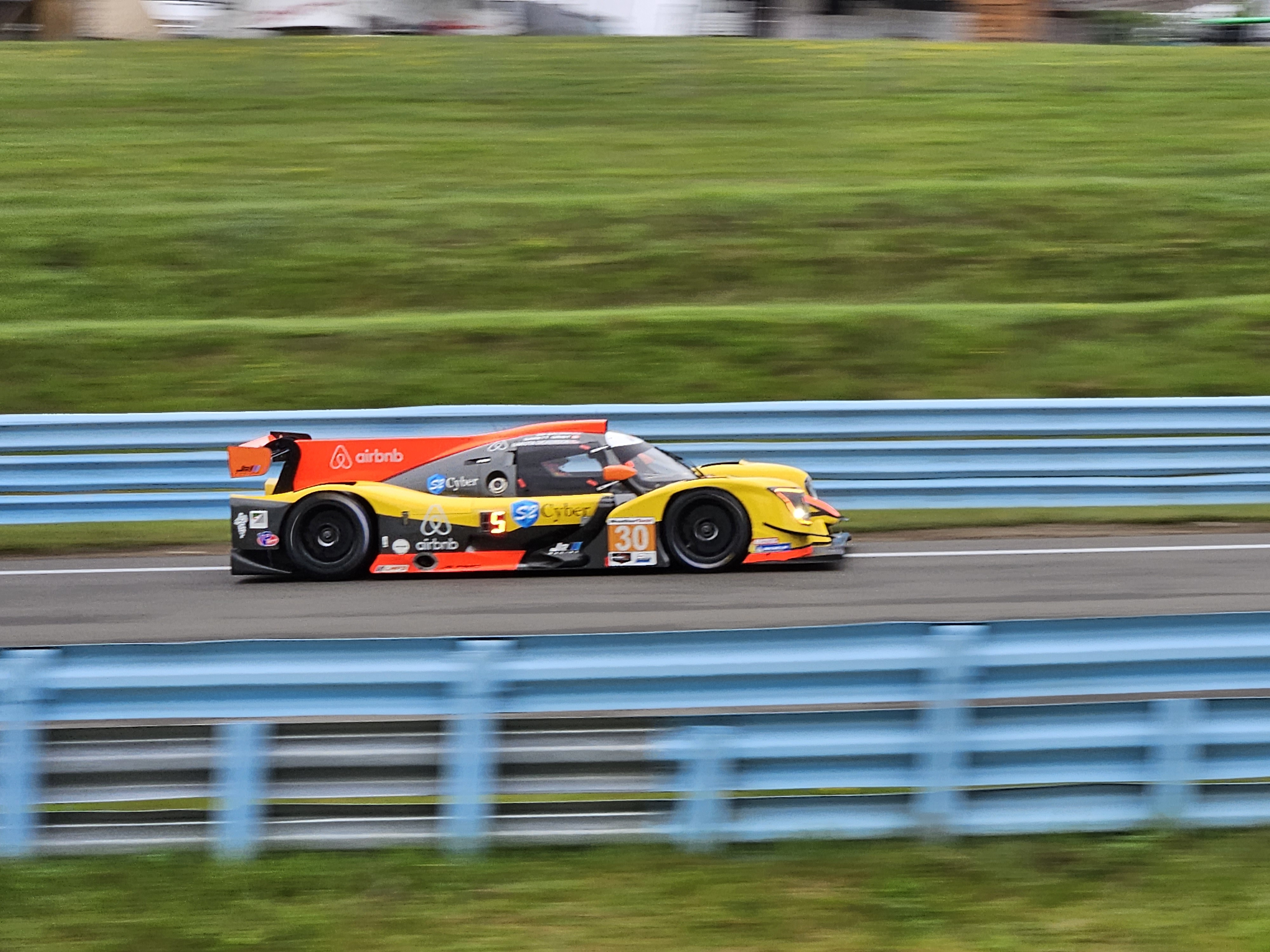
Murry's JR III Motorsports LMP3 at Watkins Glen in 2023.

Stepping up to LMP2 competition for 2022, Murry joined Racing Team Nederland to race in the Endurance rounds of the IMSA SportsCar Championship. Murry finished second in class at the 24 Hours of Daytona and the 12 Hours of Sebring, and then taking third at the Six Hours of The Glen before the season team withdrew from the Petit Le Mans following its co-founder and designated Bronze driver Frits van Eerd's arrest. The following year, Murry made a one-off return to LMP3 competition, racing in the Six Hours of The Glen for JR III Motorsports and finishing second in class in his only race of the year.

Returning to LMP2 machinery for 2024, Murry joined Richard Mille AF Corse to compete at the IMSA Battle on the Bricks, in which he finished sixth in class. Returning to the team for 2025, Murry only raced with them at the 24 Hours of Daytona, in which he retired from the lead with two hours to go following a mechanical issue. Murry remained with the team for the following year's event, in which he retired in the third hour after he spun at the International Horseshoe and was then crashed into by Adam Adelson.

== Racing record ==
=== Racing career summary ===
Season	Series	Team	Races	Wins	Poles	F/Laps	Podiums	Points	Position
2017	NASCAR K&N Pro Series East	Rette Jones Racing	2	0	0	0	0	74	26th
2018	Continental Tire SportsCar Challenge – GS	BGB Motorsports	6	0	0	0	0	72	34th
2019	Michelin Pilot Challenge – GS	Wynn's - Riley Motorsports	10	1	0	0	2	215	6th
2019	IMSA Prototype Challenge	MLT Motorsports	5	1	0	0	1	130	5th
2019	NASCAR K&N Pro Series East	Jefferson Pitts Racing	1	0	0	0	0	68	32nd
2019	IMSA Michelin Encore – GT4	Riley Motorsport	1	1	0	0	1	—N/a	**1st**
2020	Michelin Pilot Challenge – GS	Wynn's - Riley Motorsports	10	1	0	1	3	237	**3rd**
2020	IMSA Prototype Challenge	Riley Motorsport	1	0	0	0	0	19	32nd
2020	Indianapolis 8 Hours – GT4	BGB Motorsports	1	0	0	0	0	—N/a	7th
2021	IMSA SportsCar Championship – LMP3	Riley Motorsport	7	0	0	2	5	1922	**3rd**
2021	Porsche Carrera Cup North America – Pro	BGB Motorsports	16	0	0	0	0	123	7th
2021	IMSA Prototype Challenge	Riley Motorsports	0	0	0	0	0	0	33rd
2022	IMSA SportsCar Championship – LMP2	Racing Team Nederland	3	0	0	0	3	676	15th
2023	IMSA SportsCar Championship – LMP3	Jr III Motorsports	1	0	0	0	1	320	27th
2024	IMSA SportsCar Championship – LMP2	Richard Mille AF Corse	1	0	0	0	0	275	45th
2025	IMSA SportsCar Championship – LMP2	AF Corse	1	0	0	0	0	264	48th
2026	IMSA SportsCar Championship – LMP2	AF Corse USA	1	0	0	0	0	199	42nd

=== Complete NASCAR results ===
==== K&N Pro Series East ====
NASCAR K&N Pro Series East results
Year	Team	No.	Make	1	2	3	4	5	6	7	8	9	10	11	12	13	14	NKNPSE	Pts
2017	Rette Jones Racing	28	Ford	NSM	GRE; 6	BRI	SBO	SBO	MEM	BLN	TMP	NHA	IOW	GLN; 8	LGY	NJE	DOV	26th	74
2019	Jefferson Pitts Racing	7	Ford	NSM	BRI	SBO	SBO	MEM	NHA	IOW	GLN; 6	BRI	GTW	NHA	DOV			32nd	38

=== Complete Michelin Pilot Challenge results ===
(key) (Races in bold indicate pole position) (Races in italics indicate fastest lap)

Year	Entrant	Class	Make	1	2	3	4	5	6	7	8	9	10	Rank	Points
2018	BGB Motorsports	Grand Sport	Porsche 718 Cayman GT4 Clubsport	DAY; 17	SEB; 12	MOH; 24	WGL; 19	MOS	LIM	ELK; 24	VIR	LGA	ATL; 19	34th	72
2019	Wynn's - Riley Motorsports	Grand Sport	Mercedes-AMG GT4	DAY; 29	SEB; 4	MOH; 2	WGL; 1	MOS; 18	LIM; 8	ELK; 8	VIR; 11	LGA; 5	ATL; 18	6th	215
2020	Wynn's - Riley Motorsports	Grand Sport	Mercedes-AMG GT4	DAY; 1	SEB; 9	ELK; 4	VIR; 2	ATL; 21	MOH; 1; 19	MOH; 2; 2	ATL; 9	LAG; 13	SEB; 5	3rd	237

=== Complete IMSA SportsCar Championship results ===
(key) (Races in bold indicate pole position; results in italics indicate fastest lap)

Year	Team	Class	Make	Engine	1	2	3	4	5	6	7	Pos.	Points
2021	Riley Motorsports	LMP3	Ligier JS P320	Nissan VK56DE 5.6 L V8	DAY; 4†	SEB; 2	MDO; 3	WGL; 3	WGL; 2	ELK; 4	PET; 3	3rd	1922
2022	Racing Team Nederland	LMP2	Oreca 07	Gibson GK428 V8	DAY; 2†	SEB; 2	LGA	MDO	WGL; 3	ELK	PET	15th	676
2023	Jr III Motorsports	LMP3	Ligier JS P320	Nissan VK56DE 5.6 L V8	DAY	SEB	WGL; 2	MOS	ELK	IMS	PET	27th	320
2024	Richard Mille AF Corse	LMP2	Oreca 07	Gibson GK428 4.2 L V8	DAY	SEB	WGL	MOS	ELK	IMS; 6	ATL	45th	275
2025	AF Corse	LMP2	Oreca 07	Gibson GK428 4.2 L V8	DAY; 7	SEB	WGL	MOS	ELK	IMS	ATL	48th	264
2026	AF Corse USA	LMP2	Oreca 07	Gibson GK428 4.2 L V8	DAY; 13	SEB	WGL	MOS	ELK	IMS	PET	42nd	199

^{†} Points only counted towards the Michelin Endurance Cup, and not the overall LMP2 Championship.
