= 2019 IMSA Michelin Encore =

Race details
Date	10 November 2019
Official name	IMSA Michelin SportsCar Encore
Location	Sebring, Florida, United States
Course	Permanent circuit 6.02 km (3.74 mi)
Distance	Main Race; 4 Hours
- LMP3

Pole
Drivers	(United States) Blake Mount (United States) Dan Goldburg (United States) Baylor Griffin	Performance Tech Motorsports
Time	1:59.774

Podium
First	(United States) Joel Janco (United States) Jonathan Jorge (United States) Tristan Nunez	Forty 7 Motorsports
Second	(United States) Naj Husain (United Kingdom) Wayne Boyd	Sean Creech Motorsport
Third	(United Kingdom) Matthew Bell (United States) James McGuire Jr (Netherlands) Kay van Berlo	Robillard Racing
- GT3

Pole
Drivers	(United States) Bryan Sellers (United States) Madison Snow	Paul Miller Racing
Time	2:01.027

Podium
First	(United States) Gar Robinson (United States) Lawson Aschenbach	Riley Motorsports
Second	(United States) Ryan Hardwick (United States) Maxwell Root (Belgium) Jan Heylen	Wright Motorsports
Third	(United States) Tim Pappas (United States) Marc Miller (United States) Spencer Pumpelly	Black Swan Racing
- GT4

Pole
Drivers	(United States) James Pesek (United States) Jade Buford (United States) Shane Lewis	PF Racing
Time	2:11.664

Podium
First	(United States) Jim Cox (United States) Dylan Murry	Riley Motorsports
Second	(United States) Sameer Gandhi (United States) Tom Dyer	CarBahn with Peregrine Racing
Third	(United States) James Pesek (United States) Jade Buford (United States) Shane Lewis	PF Racing

The 2019 IMSA Michelin SportsCar Encore was the second edition of the non-championship sports car race held at Sebring International Raceway on 10 November 2019. The race was open to LMP3 cars, GT3-spec cars, GT4-spec cars and TCR-touring cars (although none were entered). The event was organized by the International Motor Sports Association (IMSA).

The race was won by Tristan Nunez, Jonathan Jorge, and Joel Janco in the Forty 7 Motorsports Norma M30. The GT3 class was won by Riley Motorsports with drivers Gar Robinson and Lawson Aschenbach. GT4 was won by James Pesek, Jade Buford, and Shane Lewis also run by Riley Motorsports.

== Classes ==
- Le Mans Prototype 3 (LMP3)
- GT3
- GT4

== Entry list ==
=== LMP3 ===
Team	Car	Engine	No.	Drivers
(United States) ANSA Motorsports	Ligier JS P3	Nissan VK50VE 5.0L V8	2	(United States) Jon Brownson
(United States) ANSA Motorsports	Ligier JS P3	Nissan VK50VE 5.0L V8	2	(United States) Tim George
(United States) ANSA Motorsports	Ligier JS P3	Nissan VK50VE 5.0L V8	2	(United States) Neil Alberico
(United States) Performance Tech Motorsports	Ligier JS P3	Nissan VK50VE 5.0L V8	6	(United States) Blake Mount
(United States) Performance Tech Motorsports	Ligier JS P3	Nissan VK50VE 5.0L V8	6	(United States) Dan Goldburg
(United States) Performance Tech Motorsports	Ligier JS P3	Nissan VK50VE 5.0L V8	6	(United States) Baylor Griffin
(United States) Performance Tech Motorsports	Ligier JS P3	Nissan VK50VE 5.0L V8	75	(Canada) Cameron Cassels
(United States) Performance Tech Motorsports	Ligier JS P3	Nissan VK50VE 5.0L V8	75	(United States) Max Hanratty
(United States) K2R Motorsports	Ligier JS P3	Nissan VK50VE 5.0L V8	26	(United Kingdom) Matthew Bell
(United States) K2R Motorsports	Ligier JS P3	Nissan VK50VE 5.0L V8	26	(United States) James McGuire Jr
(United States) K2R Motorsports	Ligier JS P3	Nissan VK50VE 5.0L V8	26	(Netherlands) Kay van Berlo
(United States) K2R Motorsports	Ligier JS P3	Nissan VK50VE 5.0L V8	64	(United States) Scott Andrews
(United States) K2R Motorsports	Ligier JS P3	Nissan VK50VE 5.0L V8	64	(United States) Naveen Rao
(United States) Sean Creech Motorsport	Ligier JS P3	Nissan VK50VE 5.0L V8	30	(United States) Naj Husain
(United States) Sean Creech Motorsport	Ligier JS P3	Nissan VK50VE 5.0L V8	30	(United Kingdom) Wayne Boyd
(United States) Sean Creech Motorsport	Ligier JS P3	Nissan VK50VE 5.0L V8	33	(United States) Scott Lagasse
(United States) Sean Creech Motorsport	Ligier JS P3	Nissan VK50VE 5.0L V8	33	(United States) Lance Willsey
(United States) Robillard Racing	Norma M30	Nissan VK50VE 5.0L V8	43	(United States) Joe Robillard
(United States) Robillard Racing	Norma M30	Nissan VK50VE 5.0L V8	43	(United Kingdom) Stevan McAleer
(United States) Forty 7 Motorsports	Norma M30	Nissan VK50VE 5.0L V8	47	(United States) Joel Janco
(United States) Forty 7 Motorsports	Norma M30	Nissan VK50VE 5.0L V8	47	(United States) Jonathan Jorge
(United States) Forty 7 Motorsports	Norma M30	Nissan VK50VE 5.0L V8	47	(United States) Tristan Nunez
(United States) Conquest Racing	Norma M30	Nissan VK50VE 5.0L V8	61	(United States) Danny Kok
(United States) Conquest Racing	Norma M30	Nissan VK50VE 5.0L V8	61	(Canada) George Staikos

=== GT3 ===
Team	Car	Engine	No.	Drivers
(United States) Wright Motorsports	Porsche 911 GT3 R	Porsche 4.0 L Flat-6	16	(United States) Ryan Hardwick
(United States) Wright Motorsports	Porsche 911 GT3 R	Porsche 4.0 L Flat-6	16	(United States) Maxwell Root
(United States) Wright Motorsports	Porsche 911 GT3 R	Porsche 4.0 L Flat-6	16	(Belgium) Jan Heylen
(United States) Paul Miller Racing	Lamborghini Huracán GT3 Evo	Lamborghini DGF 5.2 L V10	48	(United States) Bryan Sellers
(United States) Paul Miller Racing	Lamborghini Huracán GT3 Evo	Lamborghini DGF 5.2 L V10	48	(United States) Madison Snow
(United States) Black Swan Racing	Porsche 911 GT3 R	Porsche 4.0 L Flat-6	54	(United States) Tim Pappas
(United States) Black Swan Racing	Porsche 911 GT3 R	Porsche 4.0 L Flat-6	54	(United States) Marc Miller
(United States) Black Swan Racing	Porsche 911 GT3 R	Porsche 4.0 L Flat-6	54	(United States) Spencer Pumpelly
(United States) Riley Motorsports	Mercedes-AMG GT3	Mercedes-AMG M159 6.2 L V8	74	(United States) Gar Robinson
(United States) Riley Motorsports	Mercedes-AMG GT3	Mercedes-AMG M159 6.2 L V8	74	(United States) Lawson Aschenbach

=== GT4 ===
Team	Car	Engine	No.	Drivers
(United States) Riley Motorsports	Mercedes-AMG GT4	Mercedes-AMG M178 4.0 L V8	35	(United States) Jim Cox
(United States) Riley Motorsports	Mercedes-AMG GT4	Mercedes-AMG M178 4.0 L V8	35	(United States) Dylan Murry
(United States) PF Racing	Ford Mustang GT4	Ford Voodoo 5.2 L V8	40	(United States) James Pesek
(United States) PF Racing	Ford Mustang GT4	Ford Voodoo 5.2 L V8	40	(United States) Jade Buford
(United States) PF Racing	Ford Mustang GT4	Ford Voodoo 5.2 L V8	40	(United States) Shane Lewis
(United States) CarBahn with Peregrine Racing	Audi R8 LMS GT4	Audi DAR 5.2 L V10	93	(United States) Sameer Gandhi
(United States) CarBahn with Peregrine Racing	Audi R8 LMS GT4	Audi DAR 5.2 L V10	93	(United States) Tom Dyer
(United States) Turner Motorsport	BMW M4 GT4	BMW N55 3.0 L Twin-Turbo I6	96	(United States) Robby Foley
(United States) Turner Motorsport	BMW M4 GT4	BMW N55 3.0 L Twin-Turbo I6	96	(United States) Vin Barletta

== Race results ==
Class winners denoted in bold and with ‡

Pos	Class	No.	Team / Entrant	Drivers	Chassis	Laps	Time/Gap
Pos	Class	No.	Team / Entrant	Drivers	Engine	Laps	Time/Gap
1	**LMP3**	**47**	**(United States) Forty 7 Motorsports**	**(United States) Joel Janco** **(United States) Jonathan Jorge** **(United States) Tristan Nunez**	**Norma M30**	**106**	**4:00:49.084‡**
1	**LMP3**	**47**	**(United States) Forty 7 Motorsports**	**(United States) Joel Janco** **(United States) Jonathan Jorge** **(United States) Tristan Nunez**	**Nissan VK50VE 5.0 L V8**	**106**	**4:00:49.084‡**
2	LMP3	30	(United States) Sean Creech Motorsport	(United States) Naj Husain (United Kingdom) Wayne Boyd	Ligier JS P3	106	+0.877
2	LMP3	30	(United States) Sean Creech Motorsport	(United States) Naj Husain (United Kingdom) Wayne Boyd	Nissan VK50VE 5.0 L V8	106	+0.877
3	LMP3	43	(United States) Robillard Racing	(United States) Joe Robillard (United Kingdom) Stevan McAleer	Norma M30	106	+1.572
3	LMP3	43	(United States) Robillard Racing	(United States) Joe Robillard (United Kingdom) Stevan McAleer	Nissan VK50VE 5.0 L V8	106	+1.572
4	LMP3	26	(United States) K2R Motorsports	(United States) James McGuire Jr (United Kingdom) Matthew Bell (Netherlands) Kay van Berlo	Ligier JS P3	106	+38.709
4	LMP3	26	(United States) K2R Motorsports	(United States) James McGuire Jr (United Kingdom) Matthew Bell (Netherlands) Kay van Berlo	Nissan VK50VE 5.0 L V8	106	+38.709
5	**GT3**	**74**	**(United States) Riley Motorsports**	**(United States) Gar Robinson** **(United States) Lawson Aschenbach**	**Mercedes-AMG GT3**	**106**	**+48.508‡**
5	**GT3**	**74**	**(United States) Riley Motorsports**	**(United States) Gar Robinson** **(United States) Lawson Aschenbach**	**Mercedes-AMG M159 6.2 L V8**	**106**	**+48.508‡**
6	GT3	16	(United States) Wright Motorsports	(United States) Ryan Hardwick (United States) Maxwell Root (Belgium) Jan Heylen	Porsche 911 GT3 R	106	+49.323
6	GT3	16	(United States) Wright Motorsports	(United States) Ryan Hardwick (United States) Maxwell Root (Belgium) Jan Heylen	Porsche 4.0 L Flat-6	106	+49.323
7	GT3	54	(United States) Black Swan Racing	(United States) Tim Pappas (United States) Marc Miller (United States) Spencer Pumpelly	Porsche 911 GT3 R	106	+51.214
7	GT3	54	(United States) Black Swan Racing	(United States) Tim Pappas (United States) Marc Miller (United States) Spencer Pumpelly	Porsche 4.0 L Flat-6	106	+51.214
8	GT3	48	(United States) Paul Miller Racing	(United States) Bryan Sellers (United States) Madison Snow	Lamborghini Huracán GT3 Evo	106	+51.763
8	GT3	48	(United States) Paul Miller Racing	(United States) Bryan Sellers (United States) Madison Snow	Lamborghini DGF 5.2 L V10	106	+51.763
9	LMP3	75	(United States) Performance Tech Motorsports	(Canada) Cameron Cassels (United States) Max Hanratty	Ligier JS P3	105	+1 Lap
9	LMP3	75	(United States) Performance Tech Motorsports	(Canada) Cameron Cassels (United States) Max Hanratty	Nissan VK50VE 5.0 L V8	105	+1 Lap
10	LMP3	6	(United States) Performance Tech Motorsports	(United States) Blake Mount (United States) Dan Goldburg (United States) Baylor Griffin	Ligier JS P3	105	+1 Lap
10	LMP3	6	(United States) Performance Tech Motorsports	(United States) Blake Mount (United States) Dan Goldburg (United States) Baylor Griffin	Nissan VK50VE 5.0 L V8	105	+1 Lap
11	LMP3	61	(United States) Conquest Racing	(United States) Danny Kok (Canada) George Staikos	Norma M30	99	+7 Laps
11	LMP3	61	(United States) Conquest Racing	(United States) Danny Kok (Canada) George Staikos	Nissan VK50VE 5.0 L V8	99	+7 Laps
12	**GT4**	**35**	**(United States) Riley Motorsports**	**(United States) Jim Cox** **(United States) Dylan Murry**	**Mercedes-AMG GT4**	**99**	**+7 Laps‡**
12	**GT4**	**35**	**(United States) Riley Motorsports**	**(United States) Jim Cox** **(United States) Dylan Murry**	**Mercedes-AMG M178 4.0 L V8**	**99**	**+7 Laps‡**
13	GT4	93	(United States) CarBahn with Peregrine Racing	(United States) Sameer Gandhi (United States) Tom Dyer	Audi R8 LMS GT4	95	+11 Laps
13	GT4	93	(United States) CarBahn with Peregrine Racing	(United States) Sameer Gandhi (United States) Tom Dyer	Audi DAR 5.2 L V10	95	+11 Laps
14	GT4	40	(United States) PF Racing	(United States) James Pesek (United States) Jade Buford (United States) Shane Lewis	Ford Mustang GT4	84	+22 laps
14	GT4	40	(United States) PF Racing	(United States) James Pesek (United States) Jade Buford (United States) Shane Lewis	Ford Voodoo 5.2 L V8	84	+22 laps
15 DNF	GT4	96	(United States) Turner Motorsport	(United States) Robby Foley (United States) Vin Barletta	BMW M4 GT4	76	Mechanical
15 DNF	GT4	96	(United States) Turner Motorsport	(United States) Robby Foley (United States) Vin Barletta	BMW N55 3.0 L Twin-Turbo I6	76	Mechanical
16 DNF	LMP3	64	(United States) K2R Motorsports	(United States) Naveen Rao (United States) Scott Andrews	Ligier JS P3	73	Did not finish
16 DNF	LMP3	64	(United States) K2R Motorsports	(United States) Naveen Rao (United States) Scott Andrews	Nissan VK50VE 5.0 L V8	73	Did not finish
17 DNF	LMP3	2	(United States) ANSA Motorsports	(United States) Jon Brownson (United States) Tim George (United States) Neil Alberico	Ligier JS P3	54	Did not finish
17 DNF	LMP3	2	(United States) ANSA Motorsports	(United States) Jon Brownson (United States) Tim George (United States) Neil Alberico	Nissan VK50VE 5.0 L V8	54	Did not finish
18 DNF	LMP3	33	(United States) Sean Creech Motorsport	(United States) Scott Lagasse (United States) Lance Willsey	Ligier JS P3	2	Crash
18 DNF	LMP3	33	(United States) Sean Creech Motorsport	(United States) Scott Lagasse (United States) Lance Willsey	Nissan VK50VE 5.0 L V8	2	Crash
