= Spec E30 =

Class of racing cars

Spec E30 is a class of racing cars used in National Auto Sport Association (NASA) road racing events.

== Concept ==
The goal for Spec E30 is to create high levels of competition among similarly prepared BMW E30 3 Series cars at a reasonable cost. It is intended to encourage low-cost, entry-level, production car based competition. It has been called "the next big thing" in club-level racing by Grassroots Motorsports Magazine.

== Cars ==
The series consists of U.S.-spec BMW E30 325i coupes and sedans, sold between 1984 and 1991. All cars in the series must use the BMW M20B25 engine.

As a "specified" class, the rules allow for a limited number of modifications, predominantly involving required suspension parts.

Required components include:

- M20B25
- Getrag 260 5-speed transmission
- 3.73 Rear differential final drive ratio
- Stock/unmodified ECU
- A choice of either H&R Race spring set or Ground Control coilover kit
- Bilstein Sport shocks
- Spec series tire (which is currently the Maxxis Victra RC-1 or VR-1 in 205/50/15 size)
- Minimum weight with driver at the end of the race is 2700 pounds

Allowed modifications include rebuilding of the original BMW motor, but it must follow factory specifications. And even then, there is now a reward weight system that is used based on the actual output from a sanctioned dynamometer (maximum class allowed is 162.9). As well, a model dyno plot is used to compare all competitors engine output for distinct anomalies.

== Series Winners ==
=== National Championship ===
| Year | Location | 1st | 2nd | 3rd |
|---|---|---|---|---|
| 2026 | Sebring International Raceway | Jack Cobetto | Robert Grace | Charles Beach |
| 2025 | Ozarks International Raceway | Matthew Ibrahim | Sean Aron | Garrett Manes |
| 2024 | Utah Motorsports Campus | Michael Omelko | Matthew Ibrahim | Sean Aron |
| 2023 | Pittsburgh International Race Complex | Robert Grace | Jack Cobetto | Jason Griscavage |
| 2022 | Laguna Seca Raceway | Sean Lovett | Sylas Montgomery | Nick Thiemann |
| 2021 | Daytona International Speedway | Carlos Mendez | Scott McKay | Eric Pennington |
| 2019 | Mid Ohio Sports Car Course | Daniel Goldburg | Olivier Bellanger | Robert Grace |
| 2018 | Circuit of the Americas | Tim Barber | Sylas Montgomery | Alex Barroso |
| 2013 | Miller Motorsports Park | N/A (No entries) | N/A (No entries) | N/A (No entries) |
| 2012 | Mid Ohio Sports Car Course | Anthony Magagnoli | Charlie Hayes | Eric Palacio |
| 2011 | Mid Ohio Sports Car Course | Robert Grace | Eric Palacio | Jonathan Allen |
| 2010 | Miller Motorsports Park Outer Course | Frans Hansen | Gary Rieger | Chris Cobetto |
| 2009 | Miller Motorsports Park Outer Course | Chris Cobetto | Steve Ferrario | Stephen DeVinney |
| 2008 | Mid Ohio Sports Car Course | Mike Skeen | Simon Hunter | Carter Hunt |
| 2007 | Mid Ohio Sports Car Course | Chris Cobetto | Jonathan Allen | Mike Skeen |
| 2006 | Mid Ohio Sports Car Course | Chris Cobetto | Robert Patton | Carter Hunt |

=== Regional Championships ===
- 2018 Great Lakes: 1st Cliff Pearce, 2nd Eric Pennington, 3rd Fante Meng
- 2017 Northern California: Sylas Montgomery
- 2006 Mid Atlantic: Chris Cobetto
- 2005 Mid Atlantic: Carter Hunt
