= Bijoy Garg =

American racing driver (born 2002)

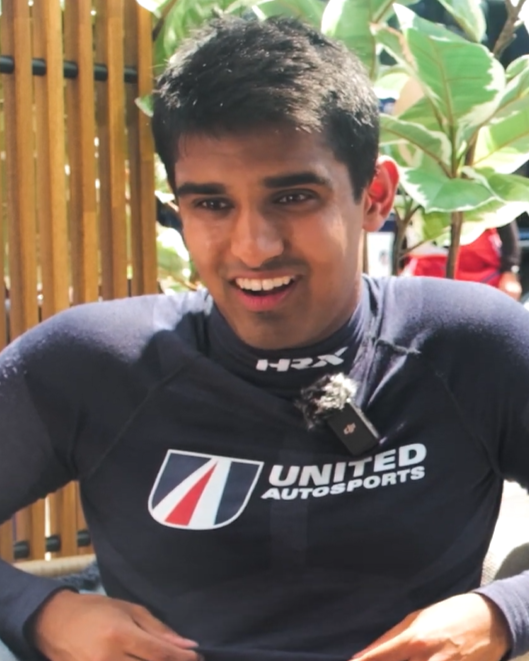
- Garg at Imola in 2024
- Nationality: (United States) American
- Born: July 15, 2002 (age 24) Stanford, California, U.S.

IMSA SportsCar Championship career
- Debut season: 2024
- Current team: Inter Europol Competition
- Categorisation: FIA Silver
- Car number: 43
- Former teams: United Autosports
- Starts: 17
- Wins: 3
- Podiums: 7
- Poles: 0
- Fastest laps: 1
- Best finish: 10th in 2023

24 Hours of Le Mans career
- Years: 2024
- Teams: United Autosports
- Best finish: 1st (2024)
- Class wins: 1 (2024)

GT World Challenge Europe career
- Debut season: 2025
- Current team: Barwell Motorsport
- Car number: 76
- Former teams: Walkenhorst Racing
- Starts: 2 (2 entries)
- Wins: 0
- Podiums: 0
- Poles: 0
- Fastest laps: 0

Previous series
- 2024 2023 2022–23 2020–22 2020–21 2019–20: European Le Mans Series; IMSA VP Racing SportsCar Challenge; USF Pro 2000 Championship; USF2000 Championship; F4 US Championship; Formula Pro USA

Championship titles
- 2023: IMSA VP Racing SportsCar Challenge

Bijoy Garg (born July 15, 2002) is an American racing driver of Indian descent. He is competing in the 24 Hours of Le Mans, IMSA SportsCar Championship, European Le Mans Series and Asian Le Mans Series for Inter Europol Competition in the LMP2 class.

Garg won the 2024 24 Hours of Le Mans in his debut with United Autosports and was the runner-up of the 2026 edition of the race. He is also the 2023 IMSA VP Racing SportsCar Challenge champion.

== Junior career ==
=== Formula 4 United States Championship ===
On June 10, 2020, Jay Howard Driver Development announced that Garg would make his car racing debut and compete with them in the Formula 4 United States Championship for the first three rounds of the 2020 season. He would end up finishing 15th in the standings come the end of the season. Garg would return for the 2021 season competing in rounds 2, 3, 4, and 6. He finished third at the first race in Mid-Ohio. Garg would finish eighth in the championship.

=== USF2000 Championship ===
In 2020 Garg competed in the USF2000 Championship driving for Jay Howard Driver Development in rounds 1–9 and 16–17. He would finish 17th in the championship.

On February 11, 2021, it was announced that Garg would return to the team for a second year. At the New Jersey Motorsports Park and the second Mid-Ohio rounds, Garg would not be eligible for points due to exceeding the maximum allotted test days for championship drivers. He would end up finishing 27th in the standings come the end of the season.

For 2022, Garg would switch to DEForce Racing. He would miss the final three races at Portland since he would compete in the final races of the Indy Pro 2000 Championship. Garg would have a career year with two podiums and finishing ninth in the championship.

=== USF Pro 2000 Championship ===
Midway through the 2022 season, it was announced that Garg would make his series debut at Gateway Motorsports Park. It was expected that he would return to the USF 2000 Championship for the final races of the season, however Garg would drive in the final races at Portland of the USF Pro 2000 Championship.

On November 28, 2022, DEForce Racing announced that Garg would move up to the USF Pro 2000 Championship to compete with the team full time in 2023.

== Sportscar racing career ==
=== IMSA VP Racing SportsCar Challenge ===
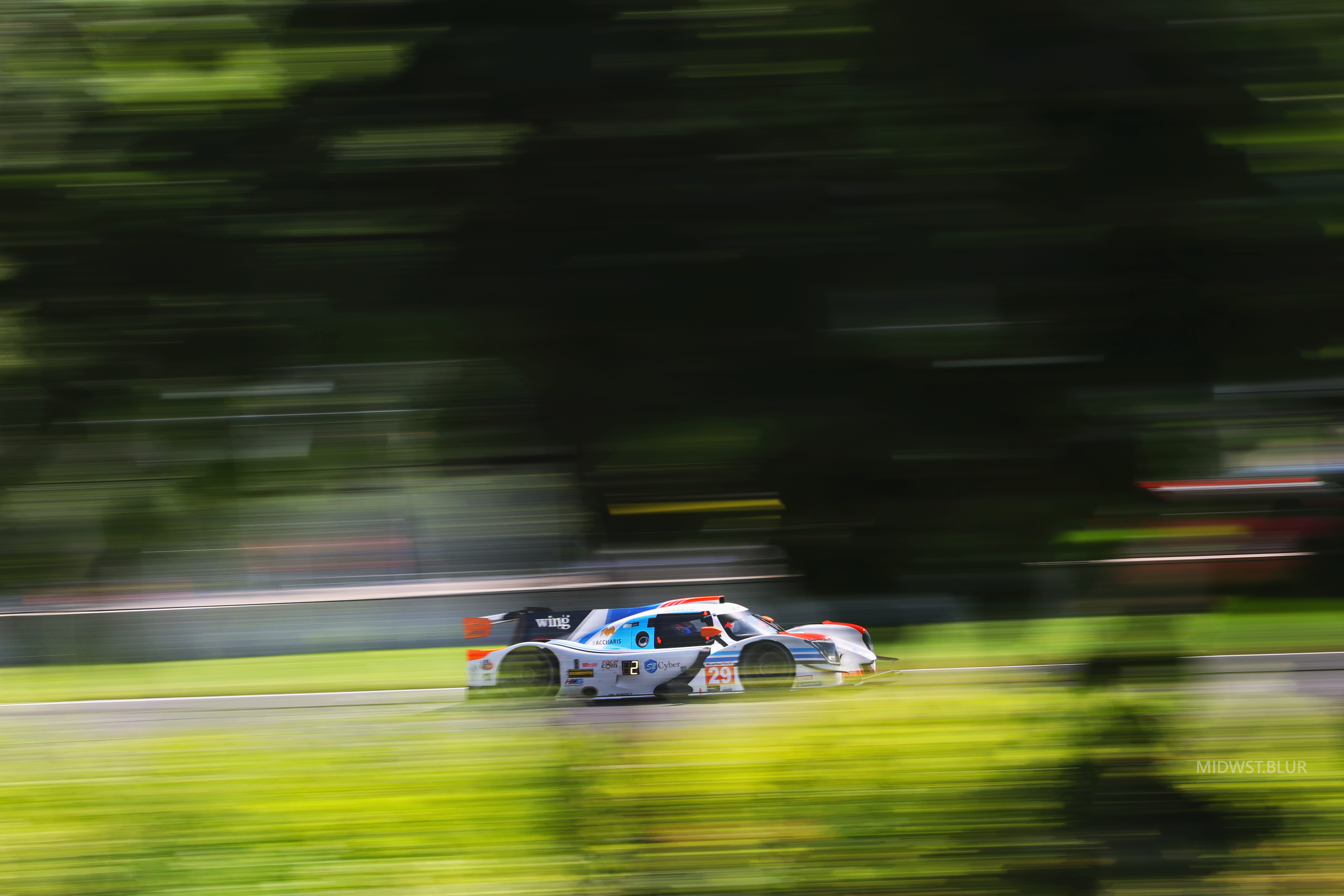
Garg in his Jr III Racing LMP3 car at Road America (2023)

Alongside a full time campaign in open wheel racing, Garg would make his sportscar racing debut in the 2023 IMSA VP Racing SportsCar Challenge driving for Jr III Racing. He would have a good debut, getting pole position for race one at Daytona, and finishing third in the race. At the second round of the championship held at Sebring, Garg would qualify on pole for both races. He went on to have a dominant performance to win both races. Following two 2nd places at Mosport, Garg would get his third win at Lime Rock Park, cutting rival Dan Goldburg's championship lead to 20 points. He would go on a four race win streak which resulted in a comfortable lead in the championship ahead of Goldburg. Going into the final round at Road Atlanta, Garg was still in a title battle with Dan Goldburg. Garg would start in second behind debutant Jagger Jones in race one. During lap one, Jones made a mistake going into turn 10, and Garg capitalized by overtaking Jones for the race lead. Garg continued to control the race up front defending against Jones. Ultimately, Garg would prevail, and win the race. While not quite winning the championship, all Garg had to do was start race two to win the title. Race two would have a chaotic end to cap off the season. With two minutes left in the race, Garg was sitting in third behind Dan Goldburg and race leader Jagger Jones. The race picture quickly changed in the span of two laps. Jones' car had a mechanical issue and came to a stop near the start/finish line. Goldburg would then inherit the lead and Garg moved up to second. During the final lap, Goldburg attempted to overtake the lapped LMP3 car of Jon Brownson, however Goldburg misjudged his entry and collided with Brownson. This resulted in Goldburg spinning out into the gravel. Garg was quickly able to close up to a recovering Goldburg and eventually overtook him. Garg held onto the lead and capped off his season with a sixth consecutive win and eight total victories, claiming the championship of the series.

=== European Le Mans Series ===
==== 2024 ====
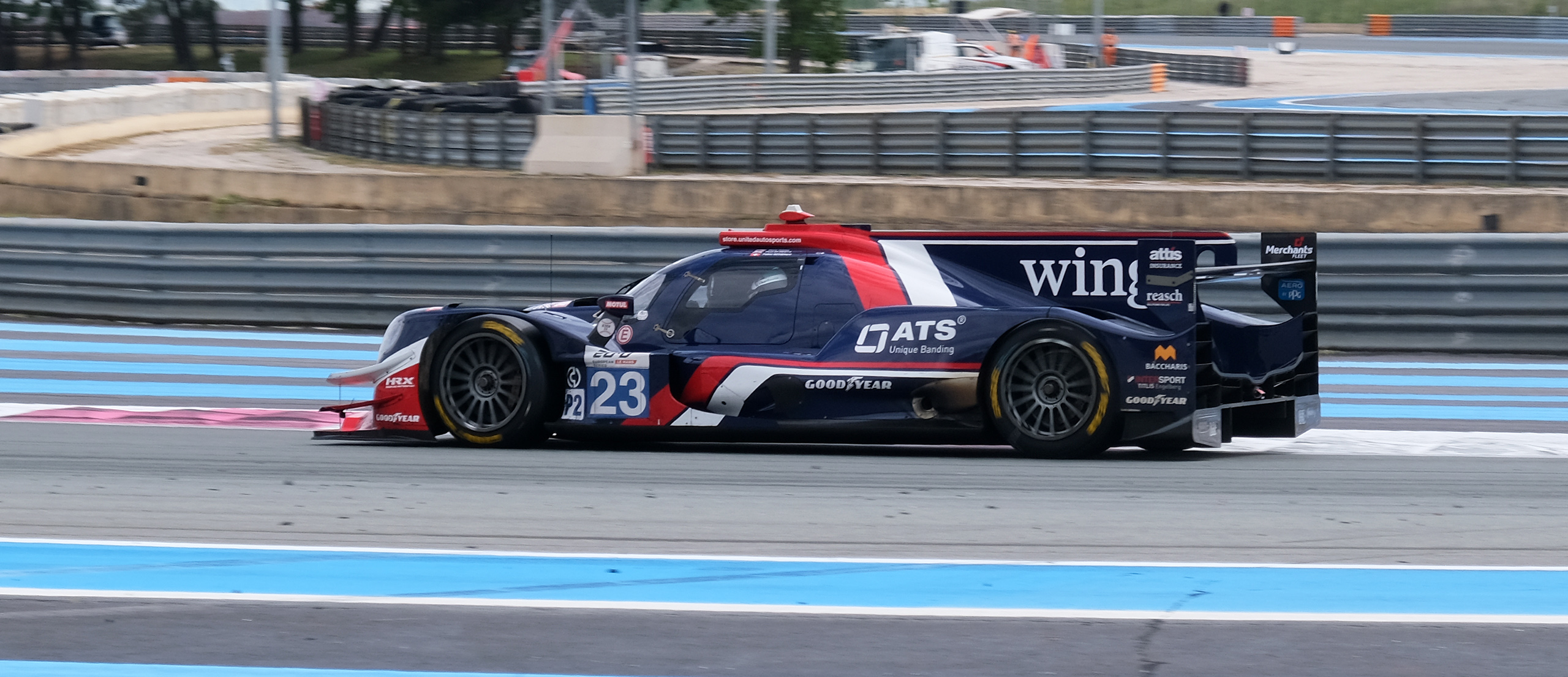
Garg at the 2024 4 Hours of Le Castellet in the European Le Mans Series

On February 6, 2024, it was announced that Garg would contest a dual LMP2 program with United Autosports where he would compete full time in the 2024 European Le Mans Series alongside his IMSA Michelin Endurance Cup races, with Paul di Resta and Fabio Scherer as partners in the car numbered 23. Garg, di Resta and Scherer finished 11th overall, with three sixth places being the best results.

==== 2026 ====
In the 2026 season, Garg returned to the series, this time as a full-season driver for Inter Europol Competition.

=== IMSA SportsCar Championship ===
==== 2023 ====
In 2023, Garg would join Jr III Motorsports to compete in select starts across the 2023 IMSA SportsCar Championship driving the No. 29 Ligier JS P320 in LMP3 alongside Colin Noble and Guilherme Oliveira. At Petit Le Mans, Garg would join Garett Grist and Dakota Dickerson to drive the No. 30 car for Jr III Motorsports. The trio would go onto get a class win in LMP3. This would mark Garg's first win the championship; he finished tenth in the overall classification.

==== 2024 ====
Following his success in the IMSA VP Racing SportsCar Challenge, Garg was signed by United Autosports for the 2024 IMSA SportsCar Championship. He would pilot the No. 22 Oreca 07 with co-drivers Dan Goldburg and Paul di Resta in the Michelin Endurance Cup rounds. Garg would have a best result of third in the 12 Hours of Sebring, which was the team's single podium result in the seven races they contested. The car finished seventh in the overall standings, while Garg placed 19th in the driver's standings.

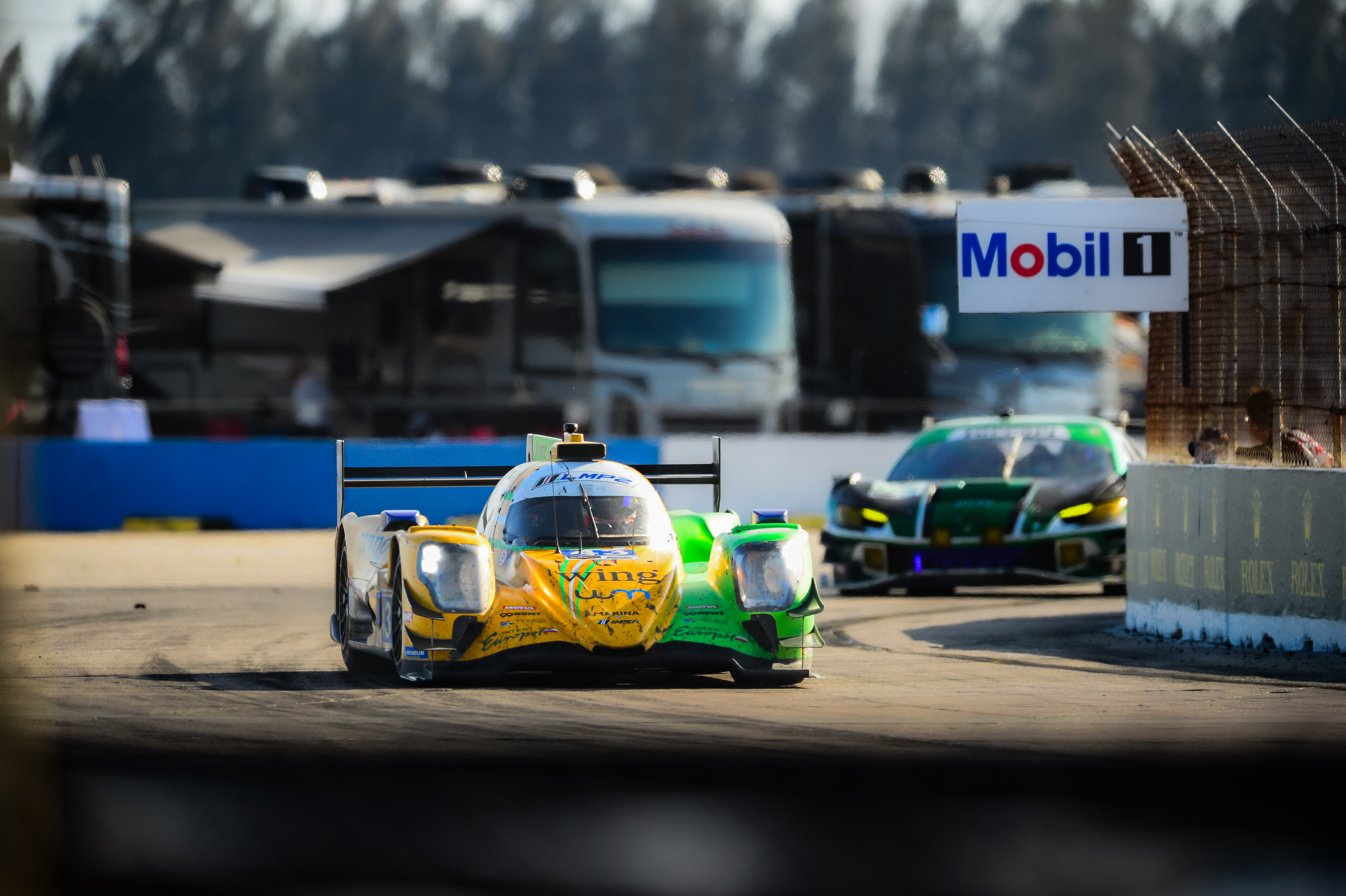
Bijoy Garg took the victory in the 2025 12 Hours of Sebring

==== 2025 ====
For the 2025 season, Garg switched teams and competed in LMP2 for Inter Europol Competition driving the No. 43 Oreca 07 alongside Jon Field, Jeremy Clarke and 2024 IMSA LMP2 champion Tom Dillmann. Garg once again contested the Michelin Endurance Cup races. The team finished the season in third place in the overall standings, while Garg was classified 18th in the driver's standings, scoring three podiums in the five races he took part in, including victory at the 12 Hours of Sebring.

==== 2026 ====
In the year of 2026, Garg continued his outings in the LMP2 class for Inter Europol Competition in a car No. 43 in the Michelin Endurance Cup rounds, with Tom Dilmann and Jeremy Clarke as his teammates. The first start of the year in the 24 Hours of Daytona brought him the second place. The entry finished the season as the series runners-up; Garg scored himself 14th place in the driver's standings, adding to the Daytona podium another second place at the 2026 Petit Le Mans and a victory in the 2026 SportsCar Grand Prix.

==== 2027 ====
Garg will return to series for the 2027 season, with the same team and codrivers as in two previous seasons.

=== 24 Hours of Le Mans ===
==== 2024 ====
On May 2, 2024, United Autosports added Garg to their 2024 24 Hours of Le Mans lineup in LMP2 along with Oliver Jarvis and Nolan Siegel. The trio in the No. 22 Oreca 07 started the race off decently, but slipped down the order when Siegel received a drive through penalty for making contact with the No. 33 DKR Engineering car at the Ford chicane. Throughout the night, race had sporadically come over the track, resulting in multiple lengthy safety car periods. This allowed the No. 22 to catch back up to the other cars. Garg, who was in the car at that point, had slowly been overtaking cars and moving himself up the order towards the front of the pack. He would then end his stint and hand the car over to Siegel. During the morning hours of the race, Siegel had been in the car setting the fastest times of anyone in LMP2. Siegel would eventually catch LMP2 class leader Reshad de Gerus in the No. 28 IDEC Sport car and eventually overtake him for the race lead. Following his stint, Siegel would hand the car over to Jarvis. The No. 22 would remain in the lead ahead of the No. 34 Inter Europol Competition car of Clément Novalak. The No. 22's lead would be halved from 35 seconds after a slow pit stop, however, Jarvis retained a comfortable lead and brought home the No. 22 in first. This marked a significant win for Garg and Siegel, as both drivers won Le Mans in their first attempt. Garg was quoted saying: "To win Le Mans on my first attempt is unbelievable! This win wouldn't have been possible without the engineers and mechanics. You need to execute on a lot of setup changes every pit stop, and they did that. I couldn't be more proud for the team and couldn't be more happy to win with these guys."

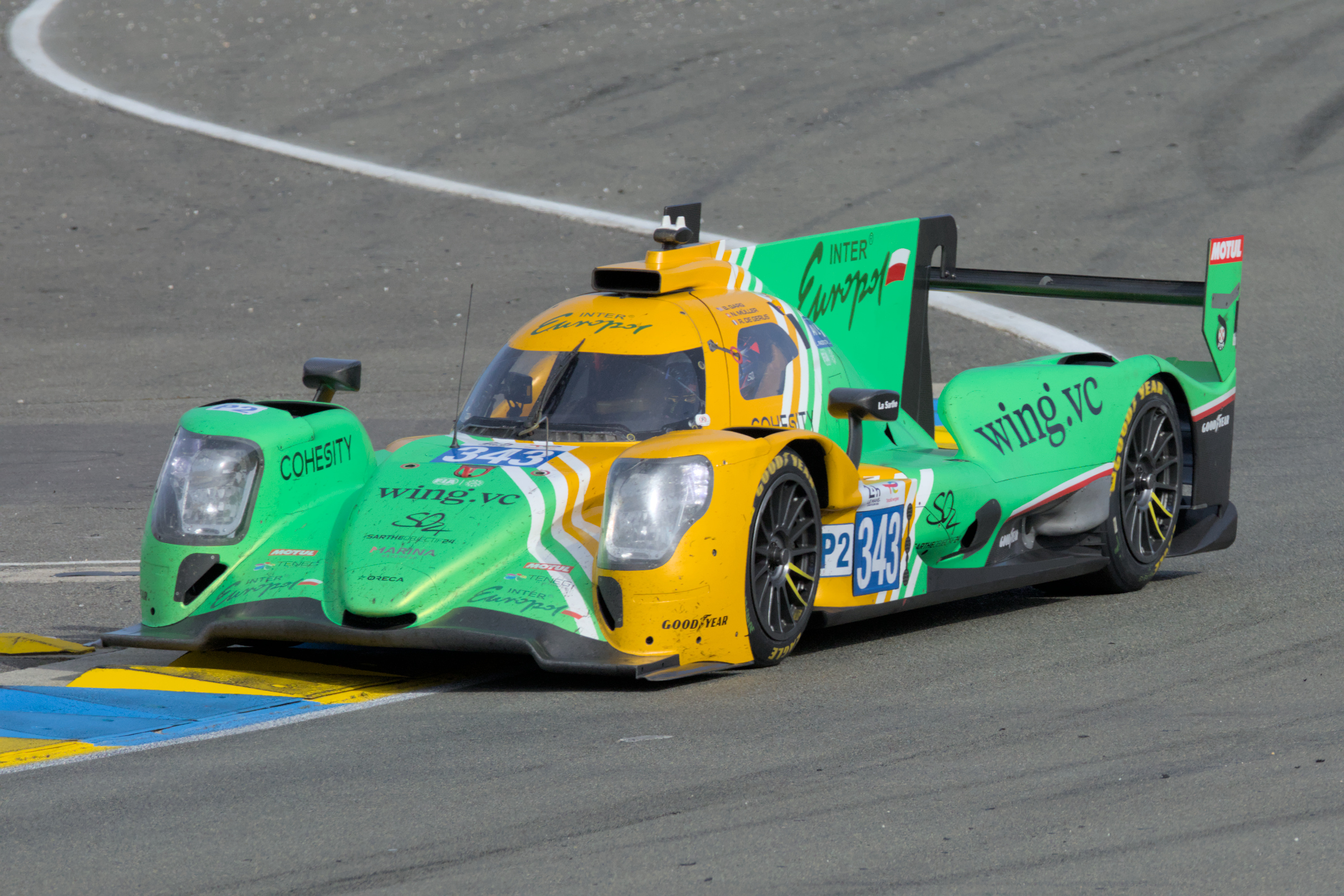
Garg finished second in the 2026 edition of the 24 Hours of Le Mans

==== 2026 ====
Garg contested the 2026 24 Hours of Le Mans in LMP2 with Inter Europol Competition, driving a car number No. 343, finishing the race in second place, narrowly losing the victory to the sister car.

=== GT World Challenge Europe ===
==== 2025 ====
Garg took part in selected rounds in the different categories of the 2025 GT World Challenge Europe, driving a Lamborghini Huracán GT3 Evo 2 for Barwell Motorsport.

== Karting record ==
=== Karting career summary ===
Season	Series	Team	Position
2017	SKUSA SuperNationals XXl — X30 Junior Class	Speedsense Motorsports	67th
2018	SKUSA SuperNationals XXl — X30 Senior Class	Speedsense Motorsports	63rd
2018	Challenge of the Americas — Junior ROK		11th
2019	ROK Cup USA ROK the RIO — Senior ROK	Speedsense Motorsports	22nd

== Racing record ==
=== Racing career summary ===
Season	Series	Team	Races	Wins	Poles	F/Laps	Podiums	Points	Position
2019	Formula Pro USA	World Speed Motorsports	2	0	0	0	0	24	9th
2020	Formula Pro USA	Jay Howard Driver Development	2	0	0	0	1	25	11st
2020	Formula 4 United States Championship	Jay Howard Driver Development	9	0	0	0	0	22	15th
2020	USF2000 Championship	Jay Howard Driver Development	11	0	0	0	0	86	17th
2021	Formula 4 United States Championship	Jay Howard Driver Development	11	0	0	2	1	64	8th
2021	USF2000 Championship	Jay Howard Driver Development	17	0	0	0	0	43	27th
2022	USF2000 Championship	DEForce Racing	15	0	0	1	2	203	9th
2022	Indy Pro 2000 Championship	DEForce Racing	4	0	0	0	0	47	18th
2023	Asian Le Mans Series - LMP3	RLR MSport	4	0	0	0	0	2	16th
2023	USF Pro 2000 Championship	DEForce Racing	16	0	0	0	1	154	12nd
2023	IMSA VP Racing SportsCar Challenge - LMP3	Jr III Racing	12	8	9	9	11	4000	**1st**
2023	IMSA SportsCar Championship - LMP3	Jr III Motorsports	3	1	0	0	1	957	10th
2024	IMSA SportsCar Championship - LMP2	United Autosports USA	5	0	0	0	1	1362	19th
2024	European Le Mans Series - LMP2	United Autosports	6	0	0	0	0	27	11st
2024	24 Hours of Le Mans - LMP2	United Autosports	1	1	0	0	1	N/A	**1st**
2024	GT World Challenge Europe Endurance Cup	Walkenhorst Racing	1	0	0	0	0	0	NC
2024	GT World Challenge Europe Endurance Cup - Bronze	Walkenhorst Racing	1	0	0	0	0	0	NC
2025	IMSA SportsCar Championship - LMP2	Inter Europol Competition	5	1	0	0	3	1560	18th
2025	Le Mans Cup - LMP3 Pro-Am	Inter Europol Competition	1	0	0	0	1	15	18th
2025	24 Hours of Le Mans - LMP2	Inter Europol Competition	Reserve driver						
2025	GT World Challenge Europe Sprint Cup	Barwell Motorsport	6	0	0	0	0	0	NC
2025	GT World Challenge Europe Sprint Cup - Silver	Barwell Motorsport	2	0	0	0	0	2	16th
2025	GT World Challenge Europe Sprint Cup - Gold	Barwell Motorsport	4	0	0	0	0	15	8th
2025	GT World Challenge Europe Endurance Cup	Barwell Motorsport	3	0	0	0	0	0	NC
2025	Formula Regional Americas Championship	Toney Driver Development	2	0	0	0	0	10	20th
2025-26	Asian Le Mans Series - LMP2	Inter Europol Competition	4	0	0	0	1	20	14th
2026	IMSA SportsCar Championship - LMP2	Inter Europol Competition	5	1	0	0	3	1632	14th
2026	European Le Mans Series - LMP2	Inter Europol Competition	6	0	1	1	2	55	6th
2026	24 Hours of Le Mans - LMP2	Inter Europol Competition	1	0	0	0	1	N/A	**2nd**
2026	IMSA VP Racing SportsCar Challenge - LMP3	Toney Driver Development	2	0	0	0	1	560	22nd
2026-27	Asian Le Mans Series - LMP2	Inter Europol Competition							

* Season still in progress.

=== American open-wheel racing results ===
==== USF2000 Championship ====
(key) (Races in bold indicate pole position) (Races in italics indicate fastest lap) (Races with * indicate most race laps led)

Year	Team	1	2	3	4	5	6	7	8	9	10	11	12	13	14	15	16	17	18	Rank	Points
2020	Jay Howard Driver Development	ROA; 1; 11	ROA; 2; 15	MOH; 1; 10	MOH; 2; 13	MOH; 3; 10	LOR; 17	IMS; 1; 13	IMS; 2; 19	IMS; 3; 11	MOH; 4	MOH; 5	MOH; 6	NJMP; 1	NJMP; 2	NJMP; 3	STP; 1; 11	STP; 2; 17		17th	86
2021	Jay Howard Driver Development	ALA; 1 DSQ	ALA; 2; 25	STP; 1; 19	STP; 2 DNS	IMS; 1; 24	IMS; 2; 22	IMS; 3; 25	LOR; 20	ROA; 1; 14	ROA; 2; 12	MOH; 1; 6	MOH; 2; 27	MOH; 3; 18	NJMP; 1; 20†	NJMP; 2; 22†	NJMP; 3; 19†	MOH; 4; 15†	MOH; 5; 17†	27th	43
2022	DEForce Racing	STP; 1; 3	STP; 2; 15	ALA; 1; 4	ALA; 2; 10	IMS; 1; 20	IMS; 2; 7	IMS; 3; 8	IRP; 2	ROA; 1; 6	ROA; 2; 4	MOH; 1; 9	MOH; 2; 17	MOH; 3; 9	TOR; 1; 12	TOR; 2; 14	POR; 1	POR; 2	POR; 3	9th	203

† Garg was not eligible for points at the New Jersey Motorsports Park and the second Mid-Ohio rounds for exceeding the maximum allotted test days for championship drivers.

==== Indy Pro 2000 / USF Pro 2000 Championship ====
(key) (Races in bold indicate pole position) (Races in italics indicate fastest lap) (Races with * indicate most race laps led)

Year	Team	1	2	3	4	5	6	7	8	9	10	11	12	13	14	15	16	17	18	Rank	Points
2022	DEForce Racing	STP; 1	STP; 2	ALA; 1	ALA; 2	IMS; 1	IMS; 2	IMS; 3	IRP	ROA; 1	ROA; 2	MOH; 1	MOH; 2	TOR; 1	TOR; 2	GMP; 10	POR; 1; 10	POR; 2; 10	POR; 3; 13	18th	47
2023	DEForce Racing	STP; 1; 12	STP; 2; 14	SEB; 1; 14	SEB; 2; 12	IMS; 1; 17	IMS; 2; 13	IRP; 14	ROA; 1; 18	ROA; 2; 19	MOH; 1; 5	MOH; 2; 8	TOR; 1; 17	TOR; 2; 9	COTA; 1	COTA; 1	POR; 1; 3	POR; 2; 7	POR; 3; 13	12th	154

=== Complete IMSA VP Racing SportsCar Challenge results ===
(key) (Races in bold indicate pole position; races in italics indicate fastest lap)

Year	Entrant	Class	Make	Engine	1	2	3	4	5	6	7	8	9	10	11	12	Rank	Points
2023	Jr III Racing	LMP3	Ligier JS P320	Nissan VK56DE 5.6 L V8	**DAY**; **1**; 3	DAY; 2; 5	**SEB**; **1**; 1	**SEB**; **2**; 1	**MOS**; **1**; 2	**MOS**; **2**; 2	**LIM**; **1**; 1	**LIM**; **2**; 1	**VIR**; **1**; 1	**VIR**; **2**; 1	ATL; 1; 1	ATL; 2; 1	1st	4000

=== Complete IMSA WeatherTech SportsCar Championship results ===
(key) (Races in bold indicate pole position; races in italics indicate fastest lap)

Year	Entrant	Class	Chassis	Engine	1	2	3	4	5	6	7	Rank	Points
2023	Jr III Motorsports	LMP3	Ligier JS P320	Nissan VK56DE 5.6 L V8	DAY	SEB	WGL	MOS	ELK; 8	IMS; 4	PET; 1	10th	957
2024	United Autosports USA	LMP2	Oreca 07	Gibson GK428 4.2 L V8	DAY; 11	SEB; 3	WGL; 5	MOS	ELK	IMS; 7	ATL; 9	19th	1362
2025	Inter Europol Competition	LMP2	Oreca 07	Gibson GK428 4.2 L V8	DAY; 10	SEB; 1	WGL; 8	MOS	ELK	IMS; 2	**ATL**; 2	18th	1560
2026	Inter Europol Competition	LMP2	Oreca 07	Gibson GK428 4.2 L V8	**DAY**; 2	SEB; 11	WGL; 4	MOS	ELK; 1	IMS	PET; 2	14th	1632

=== Complete Asian Le Mans Series results ===
(key) (Races in bold indicate pole position) (Races in italics indicate fastest lap)

Year	Team	Class	Car	Engine	1	2	3	4	5	6	Pos.	Points
2023	RLR MSport	LMP3	Ligier JS P320	Nissan VK56DE 5.6 L V8	DUB; 1; 10	DUB; 2; 10	ABU; 1; 11	ABU; 2 Ret			16th	2
2025–26	Inter Europol Competition	LMP2	Oreca 07	Gibson GK428 4.2 L V8	SEP; 1	SEP; 2	DUB; 1; 11	DUB; 2 NC	ABU; 1; 9	ABU; 2; 2	14th	20

=== Complete European Le Mans Series results ===
(key) (Races in bold indicate pole position; results in italics indicate fastest lap)

Year	Entrant	Class	Chassis	Engine	1	2	3	4	5	6	Rank	Points
2024	United Autosports	LMP2	Oreca 07	Gibson GK428 4.2 L V8	CAT; 9	LEC; 12	IMO; 6	SPA; 10	MUG; 6	ALG; 6	11th	27
2026	Inter Europol Competition	LMP2	Oreca 07	Gibson GK428 4.2 L V8	**CAT**; 2	LEC; 2	IMO; 7	SPA; 11	SIL; 6	ALG; 8	6th	55

=== Complete 24 Hours of Le Mans results ===
Year	Team	Co-drivers	Car	Class	Laps	Pos.	Class pos.
2024	(United Kingdom) United Autosports	(United Kingdom) Oliver Jarvis (United States) Nolan Siegel	Oreca 07-Gibson	LMP2	297	15th	**1st**
2026	(Poland) Inter Europol Competition	(France) Reshad de Gerus (Switzerland) Nico Müller	Oreca 07-Gibson	LMP2	360	16th	**2nd**

=== Complete GT World Challenge Europe results ===
==== GT World Challenge Europe Endurance Cup ====
(key) (Races in bold indicate pole position) (Races in italics indicate fastest lap)

Year	Team	Car	Class	1	2	3	4	5	6	7	Pos.	Points
2024	Walkenhorst Racing	Aston Martin Vantage AMR GT3 Evo	Bronze	LEC	SPA; 6H; 23	SPA; 12H; 31	SPA; 24H; Ret	NÜR	MNZ	JED	32nd	9
2025	Barwell Motorsport	Lamborghini Huracán GT3 Evo 2	Silver	LEC; 44	MNZ; 36						40th	1
2025	Barwell Motorsport	Lamborghini Huracán GT3 Evo 2	Bronze			SPA; 6H; 48	SPA; 12H; 38	SPA; 24H; 34	NÜR	CAT	39th	3

==== GT World Challenge Europe Sprint Cup ====
(key) (Races in bold indicate pole position; results in italics indicate fastest lap)

Year	Team	Car	Class	1	2	3	4	5	6	7	8	9	10	Pos.	Points
2025	Barwell Motorsport	Lamborghini Huracán GT3 Evo 2	Silver	BRH; 1	BRH; 2	ZAN; 1; 28	ZAN; 2; 38							16th	2
2025	Barwell Motorsport	Lamborghini Huracán GT3 Evo 2	Gold					MIS; 1 Ret	MIS; 2; 27	MAG; 1; 24	MAG; 2; 25	VAL; 1	VAL; 2	8th	15

=== Complete Formula Regional Americas Championship results ===
(key) (Races in bold indicate pole position) (Races in italics indicate fastest lap)

Year	Team	1	2	3	4	5	6	7	8	9	10	11	12	13	14	15	16	17	18	19	20	21	22	DC	Points
2025	Toney Driver Development	NOL; 1	NOL; 2	NOL; 3	ROA; 1	ROA; 2	ROA; 3	IMS; 1 C	IMS; 2; 8	IMS; 3; 7	MOH; 1	MOH; 2	MOH; 3	NJM; 1	NJM; 2	NJM; 3	MOS; 1	MOS; 2	MOS; 3	VIR; 1	VIR; 2	BAR; 1	BAR; 2	20th	10

=== Complete Le Mans Cup results ===
(key) (Races in bold indicate pole position; results in italics indicate fastest lap)

Year	Entrant	Class	Chassis	1	2	3	4	5	6	7	Rank	Points
2025	Inter Europol Competition	LMP3 Pro-Am	Ligier JS P325	CAT	LEC	LMS; 1	LMS; 2	SPA; 3	SIL	ALG	18th	15

Sporting positions
Preceded by none	IMSA VP Racing SportsCar Challenge; Champion; 2023	Succeeded by Steven Aghakhani
