= 2010 IMSA Prototype Lites season =

2010 IMSA Prototype Lites

Seasons
- ← 2009 2011 →

The 2010 Cooper Tires Prototype Lites season was the fourth season of the series. It consisted of eight rounds which started on March 20 at Sebring International Raceway and ended on October 2 at Road Atlanta. This was one of the support series of the American Le Mans Series.

CORE Autosport's Charlie Shears was champion in the Lites 1 class, clinching the title with a round to spare. Despite winning only three races, Shears finished every race in the points and won the championship title by 45 points from his nearest rival. Brothers Antonio and Matt Downs finished in second and third places; Antonio winning races at Miller Motorsports Park and Road America, and Matt at Millville. Three-time race winner Gary Gibson and Jon Brownson, another winner at Road America completed the top five in the championship. Shears' performances helped CORE Autosport clinch the Lites 1 teams' championship, six points clear of the Downs' Eurosport Racing outfit. In Lites 2, BERG Racing's John Weisberg and Factory 48 Motorsports' Lee Alexander dominated the class, taking 13 of the 15 wins available. Weisberg's nine wins gave him the championship title by seven points on dropped scores, from four-time winner Alexander. BERG Racing also took the teams title by six points from Factory 48. Other race wins were taken by Rick Bartuska and Eric Vassian.

== Schedule ==
All races supported the 2010 American Le Mans Series season apart from round three which was a stand-alone event. All rounds consisted of two 30 minute races.

Rnd	Race	Circuit	Location	Date
1	58th Mobil 1 12 Hours of Sebring	Sebring International Raceway	Sebring, Florida	March 20
2	Monterey Sports Car Championships	Mazda Raceway Laguna Seca	Monterey, California	May 22
3	New Jersey Race	New Jersey Motorsports Park	Millville, New Jersey	June 27
4	Larry H. Miller Dealerships Utah Grand Prix	Miller Motorsports Park	Tooele, Utah	July 10
5	American Le Mans Northeast Grand Prix	Lime Rock Park	Lakeville, Connecticut	July 24
6	Road Race Showcase	Road America	Elkhart Lake, Wisconsin	August 22
7	Grand Prix of Mosport	Mosport International Raceway	Bowmanville, Ontario	August 29
8	13th Annual Petit Le Mans	Road Atlanta	Braselton, Georgia	October 2

== Entry list ==
Team	No.	Driver	Rounds
Lites 1
Ferrari of Houston	00	Owen Kratz	1–2, 4, 6, 8
Ferrari of Houston	33	Richard Fant	1–2, 4, 6–8
Intersport Racing	2	David Ducote	1–2, 6–8
Intersport Racing	3	Wayne Ducote	1, 3–4, 6–8
Intersport Racing	37	James Kovacic	2
Eurosport Racing	4	Antonio Downs	1–7
Eurosport Racing	12	Matt Downs	1–7
Eurosport Racing	34	Jon Brownson	1–4, 6–8
Eurosport Racing	79	Lucas Downs	1–7
Eurosport Racing	88	Dan Weyland	1, 3–4, 6–8
Uberwurx Racing	5	Juan Carlos Martinez	6
Performance Tech	6	Daniel Goldburg	8
Performance Tech	8	Anthony Nicolosi	1–5, 8
Performance Tech	11	Johnny Meriggi	1–2, 4, 6, 8
Performance Tech	64	Patrick O'Neill	2–4
Performance Tech	96	Danny Mancini	1–6, 8
Comprent Motorsports	9	Jonathan Gore	6
Comprent Motorsports	24	Jonathan Gore	1
Comprent Motorsports	92	Richard Zober	3
Inspire Motorsports; CORE Autosport	13	Gary Gibson	All
Inspire Motorsports; CORE Autosport	21	Charlie Shears	All
Inspire Motorsports; CORE Autosport	54	Jon Bennett	All
Barnhart Racing; Kelly Moss Racing	17	Paul Barnhart III	1–2
Robali Motorsports	25	Robert Garcia	6
The Motorsports Group	28	Don Yount	1
Pabst Racing	40	Jim Ferro	6
Brian Graham Racing	52	Nick Majors	7
Gunnar Racing	66	Frankie Montecalvo	1–5
Leslie Racing Services	94	Darryl Shoff	1, 3, 5–6, 8
Green Earth Team Gunnar	99	Christian Zugel	1–2
Lites 2
Clueless Racing	07	Rick Bartuska	1, 6
CGI – DeAngelis Racing	7	Max DeAngelis	7–8
CGI – DeAngelis Racing	22	Robert Sabato	7–8
CGI – DeAngelis Racing	30	Michal Chlumecky	2, 7–8
WEST Racing	10	Eric Vassian	1, 8
WEST Racing	42	Jim Garrett	All
Wilzig Racing	15	Alan Wilzig	5
Factory 48 Motorsports	23	Lee Alexander	1–4, 6–8
Ansa Motorsports	44	Alain Nadal	1
Ansa Motorsports	68	Ray Langston	1
BERG Racing	48	Michael Hill	1
BERG Racing	75	John Weisberg	1–3, 5–8

== Season results ==
Rnd	Circuit	Lites 1 Race One Winning Team	Lites 2 Race One Winning Team	Lites 1 Race Two Winning Team	Lites 2 Race Two Winning Team
Rnd	Circuit	Lites 1 Race One Winning Driver	Lites 2 Race One Winning Driver	Lites 1 Race Two Winning Driver	Lites 2 Race Two Winning Driver
1	Sebring	#21 Inspire Motorsports	#23 Factory 48 Motorsports	#13 Inspire Motorsports	#75 BERG Racing
1	Sebring	Charlie Shears	Lee Alexander	Gary Gibson	John Weisberg
2	Laguna Seca	#37 Intersport Racing	#75 BERG Racing	#11 Performance Tech	#75 BERG Racing
2	Laguna Seca	James Kovacic	John Weisberg	Johnny Meriggi	John Weisberg
3	New Jersey	#21 Inspire Motorsports	#23 Factory 48 Motorsports	#12 Eurosport Racing	#75 BERG Racing
3	New Jersey	Charlie Shears	Lee Alexander	Matt Downs	John Weisberg
4	Miller	#66 Gunnar Racing	#23 Factory 48 Motorsports	#4 Eurosport Racing	#23 Factory 48 Motorsports
4	Miller	Frankie Montecalvo	Lee Alexander	Antonio Downs	Lee Alexander
5	Lime Rock	#13 Inspire Motorsports	#75 BERG Racing	not held	not held
5	Lime Rock	Gary Gibson	John Weisberg	not held	not held
6	Road America	#34 Eurosport Racing	#75 BERG Racing	#4 Eurosport Racing	#07 Clueless Racing
6	Road America	Jon Brownson	John Weisberg	Antonio Downs	Rick Bartuska
7	Mosport	#21 CORE Autosport	#75 BERG Racing	#79 Eurosport Racing	#75 BERG Racing
7	Mosport	Charlie Shears	John Weisberg	Lucas Downs	John Weisberg
8	Road Atlanta	#13 CORE Autosport	#10 WEST Racing	#8 Performance Tech	#75 BERG Racing
8	Road Atlanta	Gary Gibson	Eric Vassian	Anthony Nicolosi	John Weisberg

== Championship standings ==
=== Lites 1 ===
Pos	Driver	SEB (United States)		LAG (United States)		NJ (United States)		MIL (United States)		LRP (United States)	ROA (United States)		MOS (Canada)		ATL (United States)		Points
1	(United States) Charlie Shears	1	3	6	9	1	3	4	2	9	2	2	1	3	4	20	209
2	(United States) Antonio Downs	10	2	8	11	4	5	3	1	3	17	1	5	4			164
3	(United States) Matt Downs	7	19	2	6	3	1	10	8	6	22	4	3	2			150
4	(United States) Gary Gibson	19	1	18	22	15	16	7	17	1	4	3	2	17	1	2	149
5	(United States) Jon Brownson	8	4	10	8	8	7	6	10		1	8	7	5	2	3	148
6	(United States) Jon Bennett	4	6	13	21	2	6	2	4	13	8	20	6	8	6	18	133
7	(United States) Anthony Nicolosi	2	25	20	18	7	2	18	3	2					3	1	118
8	(United States) Lucas Downs	22	9	4	19	5	8	DNS	9	10	3	5	4	1			118
9	(United States) Johnny Meriggi	3	23	5	1			5	5		6	15			7	8	106
10	(United States) David Ducote	5	22	7	7						7	7	8	7	5	4	94
11	(United States) Frankie Montecalvo	6	7	9	16	6	4	1	16	4							90
12	(United States) Richard Fant	28	10	15	15			8	7		23	16	10	6	10	5	68
13	(United States) Danny Mancini	DSQ	26	16	10	9	10	12	12	7	11	22			16	9	55
14	(United States) Wayne Ducote	9	8			12	13	15	13		14	21	9	12	14	19	53
15	(United States) Owen Kratz	17	13	11	2			11	18		19	17			8	12	52
16	(United States) Darryl Shoff	11	11			16	DNS			5	9	11			11	16	48
17	(United States) Dan Weyland	21	12			14	14	13	11		21	18	12	11	15	13	44
18	(Republic of Ireland) Patrick O'Neill			3	17	10	DNS	9	6								42
19	(Australia) James Kovacic			1	5												36
20	(United States) Jonathan Gore	25	29								5	6					22
21	(United States) Paul Barnhart III	27	5	12	20												16
22	(United States) Daniel Goldburg														9	11	15
23	(United States) Christian Zugel	14	17	DNS	13												12
24	(United States) Richard Zober					18	9										8
25	(United States) Juan Carlos Martinez										16	12					8
26	(United States) Nick Majors												13	18			8
27	(United States) Jim Ferro										10	23					6
28	(United States) Robert Garcia										12	19					5
—	(United States) Don Yount	23	28														0
Pos	Driver	SEB (United States)		LAG (United States)		NJ (United States)		MIL (United States)		LRP (United States)	ROA (United States)		MOS (Canada)		ATL (United States)		Points

=== Lites 2 ===
Pos	Driver	SEB (United States)		LAG (United States)		NJ (United States)		MIL (United States)		LRP (United States)	ROA (United States)		MOS (Canada)		ATL (United States)		Points
1	(United States) John Weisberg	24	14	14	3	13	11			8	13	14	11	9	13	6	239
2	(United States) Lee Alexander	12	21	17	4	11	12	14	14		15	10	14	10	20	10	232
3	(United States) Jim Garrett	16	18	21	14	17	15	16	15	11	18	13	16	13	17	14	206
4	(Canada) Michal Chlumecky			19	12								15	16	19	15	82
5	(United States) Rick Bartuska	13	15								20	9					70
6	(United States) Eric Vassian	20	16												12	7	64
7	(Canada) Max DeAngelis												17	14	18	17	50
8	(United States) Alain Nadal	15	24														25
9	(United States) Ray Langston	18	20														24
10	(Canada) Robert Sabato												18	15	DNS	21	22
11	(United States) Alan Wilzig									12							16
12	(United States) Michael Hill	26	27														16
Pos	Driver	SEB (United States)		LAG (United States)		NJ (United States)		MIL (United States)		LRP (United States)	ROA (United States)		MOS (Canada)		ATL (United States)		Points
