= 2023 IMSA VP Racing SportsCar Challenge =

Inaugural season of the IMSA VP Racing SportsCar Challenge

The 2023 IMSA VP Racing SportsCar Challenge was the inaugural season of the IMSA VP Racing SportsCar Challenge. The season began on January 20 at Daytona International Speedway and concluded on October 14 at Road Atlanta.

Bijoy Garg won the LMP3 class championship after an impressive season taking eight wins throughout the 12 race season, 6 of which he won in a row. His team Jr III Racing won the Team's Championship. Francis Selldorff won the GSX class championship with 1 win and 5 additional podiums, simultaneously granting Turner Motorsport their 8th professional championship title.

== Calendar ==
The provisional 2023 calendar was released on August 5, 2022, at IMSA's annual State of the Sport Address, featuring twelve rounds split across six race weekends. Five of the six events had confirmed dates. The final calendar was confirmed on August 26, 2022, adding rounds at Daytona and Lime Rock Park while dropping the round at WeatherTech Raceway Laguna Seca.

Round	Circuit	Date
1	(United States) Daytona International Speedway, Daytona Beach, Florida	January 20–22
2	(United States) Sebring International Raceway, Sebring, Florida	March 11–12
3	(Canada) Canadian Tire Motorsport Park, Bowmanville, Ontario	July 7–9
4	(United States) Lime Rock Park, Lakeville, Connecticut	July 21–22
5	(United States) Virginia International Raceway, Alton, Virginia	August 25–27
6	(United States) Road Atlanta, Braselton, Georgia	October 11–14

== Entry list ==
=== LMP3 ===
Manufacturer	Car	Team	No.	Driver	Rounds
Duqueine	Duqueine D-08	(Belgium) Mühlner Motorsports America	18	(Germany) Mirco Schultis	1
Duqueine	Duqueine D-08	(Belgium) Mühlner Motorsports America	18	(Canada) Antonio Serravalle	2
Duqueine	Duqueine D-08	(Belgium) Mühlner Motorsports America	18	(Belgium) Denis Dupont	4
Duqueine	Duqueine D-08	(United States) JDC MotorSports	73	(United States) Dan Goldburg	All
Duqueine	Duqueine D-08	(United States) Forty7 Motorsports	47	(United States) Jon Brownson	2–3, 6
Duqueine	Duqueine D-08	(United States) Forty7 Motorsports	99	(United States) Courtney Crone	All
Duqueine	Duqueine D-08	(United States) Remstar Racing	87	(Canada) Jonathan Woolridge	2
Duqueine	Duqueine D-08	(United States) Remstar Racing	87	(United States) Jagger Jones	6
Ligier	Ligier JS P320	(United States) Jr III Racing	3	(United States) Bijoy Garg	All
Ligier	Ligier JS P320	(United States) Performance Tech Motorsports	7	(United States) Alex Kirby	3, 5–6
Ligier	Ligier JS P320	(United States) Performance Tech Motorsports	38	(Canada) Jonathan Woolridge	3, 5
Ligier	Ligier JS P320	(United States) Kelly-Moss with Riley	28	(United States) Keith McGovern	1–3
Ligier	Ligier JS P320	(United States) Kelly-Moss with Riley	86	(United States) Scott Neal	1–3
Ligier	Ligier JS P320	(United States) Sean Creech Motorsport	30	(United States) Lance Willsey	1–3, 6
Ligier	Ligier JS P320	(United States) MLT Motorsports	54	(United States) Adrian Kunzle	All
Ligier	Ligier JS P320	(United States) US RaceTronics	77	(United States) Brian Thienes	All

=== GSX ===
Manufacturer	Car	Team	No.	Driver	Rounds
Aston Martin	Aston Martin Vantage AMR GT4	(United States) Automatic Racing	09	(United States) Ramin Abdolvahabi	2
Aston Martin	Aston Martin Vantage AMR GT4	(United States) Automatic Racing	09	(United States) Rob Ecklin	4
Aston Martin	Aston Martin Vantage AMR GT4	(United States) Accelerating Performance	44	(Fédération Internationale de l'Automobile) Moisey Uretsky (Note: Moisey Uretsky is Russian, but they compete as neutral competitors using the Fédération Internationale de l'Automobile flag as Russian national emblems were banned by the association due to the Russian invasion of Ukraine.)	1–3, 5–6
Aston Martin	Aston Martin Vantage AMR GT4	(United States) Todd Coleman Racing 1–2 (United States) Archangel Motorsports 3–6	45	(United States) Scott Blind	5–6
Aston Martin	Aston Martin Vantage AMR GT4	(United States) Todd Coleman Racing 1–2 (United States) Archangel Motorsports 3–6	69	(United States) Todd Coleman	1–3, 5
Aston Martin	Aston Martin Vantage AMR GT4	(United States) van der Steur Racing	82	(United States) Brady Behrman	5–6
BMW	BMW M4 GT4 Gen II	(United States) Stephen Cameron Racing	19	(United States) Sean Quinlan	1–3, 5
BMW	BMW M4 GT4 Gen II	(United States) Stephen Cameron Racing	43	(United States) Gregory Liefooghe	2–3, 6
BMW	BMW M4 GT4 Gen II	(United States) Auto Technic Racing	24	(United States) Jake Walker	4
BMW	BMW M4 GT4 Gen II	(United States) Auto Technic Racing	25	(United States) Rob Walker	1–2
BMW	BMW M4 GT4 Gen II	(United States) Auto Technic Racing	25	(United States) Stephen Cugliari	4
BMW	BMW M4 GT4 Gen II	(United States) Auto Technic Racing	26	(United States) John Capestro-Dubets	4
BMW	BMW M4 GT4 Gen II	(United States) Turner Motorsport	95	(United States) Francis Selldorff	3–6
BMW	BMW M4 GT4 Gen II	(United States) Turner Motorsport	96	(United States) Vincent Barletta	3–6
BMW	BMW M4 GT4	(United States) Split Decision Motorsports	88	(United States) Patrick Wilmot	All
BMW	BMW M4 GT4	(United States) Split Decision Motorsports	89	(United States) Adam Thomas	6
BMW	BMW M4 GT4	(United States) Turner Motorsport	95	(United States) Francis Selldorff	1–2
BMW	BMW M4 GT4	(United States) Turner Motorsport	96	(United States) Vincent Barletta	1–2
Chevrolet	Chevrolet Camaro GT4.R	(United States) Rebel Rock Racing	72	(United States) Frank DePew	All
Ford	Ford Mustang GT4	(United States) KohR Motorsports	14	(United States) Billy Griffin	1–2, 6
Ford	Ford Mustang GT4	(United States) KohR Motorsports	14	(United States) Bob Michaelian	3, 5
Ford	Ford Mustang GT4	(United States) KohR Motorsports	59	(United States) Luca Mars	2
Ford	Ford Mustang GT4	(United States) KohR Motorsports	59	(United States) Bob Michaelian	6
Ford	Ford Mustang GT4	(Canada) Multimatic Motorsports	98	(United States) Jim Farley	1–2
Mercedes-AMG	Mercedes-AMG GT4	(United States) Murillo Racing	65	(United States) Tim Probert	All
Porsche	Porsche 718 Cayman GT4 RS Clubsport	(United States) KMW Motorsports with TMR Engineering	5	(United States) Angus Rogers	All
Porsche	Porsche 718 Cayman GT4 RS Clubsport	(United States) BGB Motorsports	17	(United States) Will Wachs	1–3, 5–6
Porsche	Porsche 718 Cayman GT4 RS Clubsport	(United States) BGB Motorsports	83	(United States) Thomas Collingwood	2
Porsche	Porsche 718 Cayman GT4 RS Clubsport	(United States) Kelly-Moss with Riley	27	(Puerto Rico) Sebastián Carazo	All
Porsche	Porsche 718 Cayman GT4 RS Clubsport	(United States) NOLASPORT	46	(United States) Adam Adelson	3, 5–6
Porsche	Porsche 718 Cayman GT4 RS Clubsport	(United States) Accelerating Performance	48	(United States) Michael Cooper	3
Porsche	Porsche 718 Cayman GT4 RS Clubsport	(United States) CarBahn with Peregrine Racing	93	(United States) Mark Siegel	1, 3
Porsche	Porsche 718 Cayman GT4 RS Clubsport	(United States) CarBahn with Peregrine Racing	93	(United States) Sameer Gandhi	2

== Race results ==
Bold indicates overall winner.

Round		Circuit	LMP3 Winner	GSX Winner
1	R1	(United States) Daytona	(United States) No. 73 JDC MotorSports	(United States) No. 14 KohR Motorsports
1	R1	(United States) Daytona	(United States) Dan Goldburg	(United States) Billy Griffin
1	R2	(United States) Daytona	(United States) No. 73 JDC MotorSports	(United States) No. 14 KohR Motorsports
1	R2	(United States) Daytona	(United States) Dan Goldburg	(United States) Billy Griffin
2	R1	(United States) Sebring	(United States) No. 3 Jr III Racing	(United States) No. 59 KohR Motorsports
2	R1	(United States) Sebring	(United States) Bijoy Garg	(United States) Luca Mars
2	R2	(United States) Sebring	(United States) No. 3 Jr III Racing	(United States) No. 43 Stephen Cameron Racing
2	R2	(United States) Sebring	(United States) Bijoy Garg	(United States) Gregory Liefooghe
3	R1	(Canada) Mosport	(United States) No. 38 Performance Tech Motorsports	(United States) No. 48 Accelerating Performance
3	R1	(Canada) Mosport	(Canada) Jonathan Woolridge	(United States) Michael Cooper
3	R2	(Canada) Mosport	(United States) No. 73 JDC MotorSports	(United States) No. 43 Stephen Cameron Racing
3	R2	(Canada) Mosport	(United States) Dan Goldburg	(United States) Gregory Liefooghe
4	R1	(United States) Lime Rock	(United States) No. 3 Jr III Racing	(United States) No. 26 Auto Technic Racing
4	R1	(United States) Lime Rock	(United States) Bijoy Garg	(United States) John Capestro-Dubets
4	R2	(United States) Lime Rock	(United States) No. 3 Jr III Racing	(United States) No. 26 Auto Technic Racing
4	R2	(United States) Lime Rock	(United States) Bijoy Garg	(United States) John Capestro-Dubets
5	R1	(United States) Virginia	(United States) No. 3 Jr III Racing	(United States) No. 95 Turner Motorsport
5	R1	(United States) Virginia	(United States) Bijoy Garg	(United States) Francis Selldorff
5	R2	(United States) Virginia	(United States) No. 3 Jr III Racing	(United States) No. 43 Stephen Cameron Racing
5	R2	(United States) Virginia	(United States) Bijoy Garg	(United States) Gregory Liefooghe
6	R1	(United States) Road Atlanta	(United States) No. 3 Jr III Racing	(United States) No. 27 Kelly-Moss with Riley
6	R1	(United States) Road Atlanta	(United States) Bijoy Garg	(Puerto Rico) Sebastián Carazo
6	R2	(United States) Road Atlanta	(United States) No. 3 Jr III Racing	(United States) No. 27 Kelly-Moss with Riley
6	R2	(United States) Road Atlanta	(United States) Bijoy Garg	(Puerto Rico) Sebastián Carazo

== Championship standings ==
=== Points system ===
Championship points are awarded in each class at the finish of each event. Points are awarded based on finishing positions in the race as shown in the chart below.

Position	1	2	3	4	5	6	7	8	9	10	11	12	13	14	15	16	17	18	19	20	21	22	23	24	25	26	27	28	29	30+
Race	350	320	300	280	260	250	240	230	220	210	200	190	180	170	160	150	140	130	120	110	100	90	80	70	60	50	40	30	20	10

=== LMP3 Driver's Championship ===
Pos.	Drivers	DAY (United States)		SEB (United States)		MOS (Canada)		LIM (United States)		VIR (United States)		ATL (United States)		Points
1	(United States) Bijoy Garg	**3**	5	**1**	**1**	**2**	**2**	**1**	**1**	**1**	**1**	1	1	4000
2	(United States) Dan Goldburg	1	**1**	2	3	4	1	2	2	2	3	5	2	3790
3	(United States) Brian Thienes	2	2	5	5	5	5	4	6	4	7	3	4	3310
4	(United States) Courtney Crone	8	3	7	10	3	4	5	3	3	6	2	3	3290
5	(United Kingdom) Adrian Kunzle	9	8	6	9	7	8	6	5	6	5	4	5	2950
6	(Canada) Jonathan Woolridge			11	6	1	6			5	4			1590
7	(United States) Lance Willsey	7	4	4	4	6	7					DNS	DNS	1570
8	(United States) Alex Kirby					8	3			7	2	7	DNS	1330
9	(United States) Keith McGovern	5	6	10	8	9	DNS							1170
10	(United States) Jon Brownson			9	7	DNS	DNS					8†	6	940
11	(United States) Scott Neal	6	9	8	11	DNS	DNS							900
12	(Canada) Antonio Serravalle			3	2									620
13	(Belgium) Denis Dupont							3	4					580
14	(Germany) Mirco Schultis	4	7											520
15	(United States) Jagger Jones											**6**	**7**	520

Colour	Result
Gold	Winner
Silver	Second place
Bronze	Third place
Green	Points classification
Blue	Non-points classification
Blue	Non-classified finish (NC)
Purple	Retired, not classified (Ret)
Red	Did not qualify (DNQ)
Red	Did not pre-qualify (DNPQ)
Black	Disqualified (DSQ)
White	Did not start (DNS)
White	Withdrew (WD)
White	Race cancelled (C)
Blank	Did not practice (DNP)
Blank	Did not arrive (DNA)
Blank	Excluded (EX)

**Bold** - Pole position

Italics - Fastest lap

†: Post-event penalty. Car moved to back of class.

=== GSX Driver's Championship ===
Pos.	Drivers	DAY (United States)		SEB (United States)		MOS (Canada)		LIM (United States)		VIR (United States)		ATL (United States)		Points
1	(United States) Francis Selldorff	5	6	5	10	**2**	4	4	3	1	2	2	3	3450
2	(Puerto Rico) Sebastián Carazo	14	2	3	2	3	6	11	10	8	3	**1**	1	3300
3	(United States) Vincent Barletta	6	13	9	11	9	8	5	6	3	11	8	7	2780
4	(United States) Patrick Wilmot	15†	15	6	3	7	5	9	9	13	12	4	4	2740
5	(United States) Angus Rogers	9	9	11	19	10	11	8	7	6	7	5	5	2650
6	(United States) Tim Probert	12	4	19	9	5	10	10	DNS	7	10	6	6	2440
7	(United States) Gregory Liefooghe			**2**	**1**	DNS	**1**			**2**	**1**	3	**2**	2310
8	(United States) Frank DePew	10	14	7	7	14	DNS	7	5	12	8	10	DNS	2160
9	(Fédération Internationale de l'Automobile) Moisey Uretsky	2	12	4	4	6	2			9	DNS	16	DNS	2010
10	(United States) Will Wachs	13	11	15	15	13	12			10	9	14	10	1880
11	(United States) Todd Coleman	4	5	8	8	11	9			14	13			1770
12	(United States) Sean Quinlan	7	8	12	5	8	7			DNS	4			1670
13	(United States) Billy Griffin	**1**	**1**	14	16							13	11	1400
14	(United States) Adam Adelson					4	3			4	DNS	9	DNS	1080
15	(United States) Rob Walker	3	3	10	6									1060
16	(United States) Scott Blind									11	6	7	8	920
17	(United States) Jim Farley	11	7	13	13									800
18	(United States) John Capestro-Dubets							**1**	**1**					700
19	(United States) Brady Behrman									5	5	15	DNS	680
20	(United States) Jake Walker							2	2					640
21	(United States) Mark Siegel	8	10			12	DNS							630
22	(United States) Michael Cooper					1	13							530
23	(United States) Stephen Cugliari							3	8					530
24	(United States) Rob Ecklin							6	4					530
25	(United States) Luca Mars			1	18									480
26	(United States) Adam Thomas											12	9	410
27	(United States) Thomas Collingwood			17	12									330
28	(United States) Ramin Abdolvahabi			16	14									320
29	(United States) Sameer Gandhi			18	17									270
30	(United States) Bob Michaelian					DNS	DNS			DNS	DNS	11	DNS	410

†: Post-event penalty. Car moved to back of class.

=== LMP3 Bronze Drivers Cup ===
Pos.	Drivers	DAY (United States)		SEB (United States)		MOS (Canada)		LIM (United States)		VIR (United States)		ATL (United States)		Points
1	(United States) Dan Goldburg	1	1	2	3	4	1	2	2	2	3	5	2	4150
2	(United States) Brian Thienes	2	2	5	5	5	5	4	6	4	7	3	4	3790
3	(United Kingdom) Adrian Kunzle	9	8	6	9	7	8	6	5	6	5	4	5	3440
4	(United States) Lance Willsey	7	4	4	4	6	7					DNS	DNS	1790
5	(United States) Keith McGovern	5	6	10	8	9	DNS							1320
6	(United States) Jon Brownson			9	7	DNS	DNS					8†	6	1090
7	(United States) Scott Neal	6	9	8	11	DNS	DNS							1000
8	(Germany) Mirco Schultis	4	7											560

=== GSX Bronze Drivers Cup ===
Pos.	Drivers	DAY (United States)		SEB (United States)		MOS (Canada)		LIM (United States)		VIR (United States)		ATL (United States)		Points
1	(United States) Vincent Barletta	6	13	9	11	9	8	5	6	3	11	8	7	3370
2	(United States) Angus Rogers	9	9	11	19	10	11	8	7	6	7	5	5	3240
3	(United States) Tim Probert	12	4	19	9	5	10	10	DNS	7	10	6	6	2950
4	(United States) Frank DePew	10	14	7	7	14	DNS	7	5	12	8	10	DNS	2600
5	(Fédération Internationale de l'Automobile) Moisey Uretsky	2	12	4	4	6	2			9	DNS	16	DNS	2360
6	(United States) Will Wachs	13	11	15	15	13	12			10	9	14	10	2260
7	(United States) Todd Coleman	4	5	8	8	11	9			14	13			2090
8	(United States) Sean Quinlan	7	8	12	5	8	7			DNS	4			2030
9	(United States) Billy Griffin	1	1	14	16							13	11	1580
10	(United States) Rob Walker	3	3	10	6									1180
11	(United States) Scott Blind									11	6	7	8	1120
12	(United States) Jim Farley	11	7	13	13									920
13	(United States) Brady Behrman									5	5	15	DNS	850
14	(United States) Mark Siegel	8	10			12	DNS							710
15	(United States) Rob Ecklin							6	4					670
16	(United States) Adam Thomas											12	9	500
17	(United States) Thomas Collingwood			17	12									420
18	(United States) Ramin Abdolvahabi			16	14									410
19	(United States) Sameer Gandhi			18	17									360
20	(United States) Bob Michaelian					DNS	DNS			DNS	DNS	11	DNS	250

=== LMP3 Team's Championship ===
Pos.	Team	DAY (United States)		SEB (United States)		MOS (Canada)		LIM (United States)		VIR (United States)		ATL (United States)		Points
1	(United States) #3 Jr III Racing	**3**	5	**1**	**1**	**2**	**2**	**1**	**1**	**1**	**1**	1	1	4000
2	(United States) #73 JDC MotorSports	1	**1**	2	3	4	1	2	2	2	3	5	2	3790
3	(United States) #77 US RaceTronics	2	2	5	5	5	5	4	6	4	7	3	4	3310
4	(United States) #99 Forty7 Motorsports	8	3	7	10	3	4	5	3	3	6	2	3	3290
5	(United States) #54 MLT Motorsports	9	8	6	9	7	8	6	5	6	5	4	5	2950
6	(Belgium) #18 Mühlner Motorsports America	4	7	3	2			3	4					1720
7	(United States) #30 Sean Creech Motorsport	7	4	4	4	6	7					DNS	DNS	1570
8	(United States) #7 Performance Tech Motorsports					8	3			7	2	7	DNS	1330
9	(United States) #28 Kelly-Moss with Riley	5	6	10	8	9	DNS							1170
10	(United States) #38 Performance Tech Motorsports					1	6			5	4			1140
11	(United States) #87 Remstar Racing			11	6							**6**	**7**	940
12	(United States) #47 Forty7 Motorsports			9	7	DNS	DNS					8†	6	940
13	(United States) #86 Kelly-Moss with Riley	6	9	8	11	DNS	DNS							900

=== GSX Team's Championship ===
Pos.	Drivers	DAY (United States)		SEB (United States)		MOS (Canada)		LIM (United States)		VIR (United States)		ATL (United States)		Points
1	(United States) #95 Turner Motorsport	5	6	5	10	**2**	4	4	3	1	2	2	3	3450
2	(United States) #27 Kelly-Moss with Riley	14	2	3	2	3	6	11	10	8	3	**1**	1	3300
3	(United States) #96 Turner Motorsport	6	13	9	11	9	8	5	6	3	11	8	7	2780
4	(United States) #88 Split Decision Motorsports	15†	15	6	3	7	5	9	9	13	12	4	4	2740
5	(United States) #19 Stephen Cameron Racing	7	8	12	5	8	7			**2**	**1**	3	**2**	2680
6	(United States) #5 KMW Motorsports with TMR Engineering	9	9	11	19	10	11	8	7	6	7	5	5	2650
7	(United States) #65 Murillo Racing	12	4	19	9	5	10	10	DNS	7	10	6	6	2440
8	(United States) #72 Rebel Rock Racing	10	14	7	7	14	DNS	7	5	12	8	10	DNS	2160
9	(United States) #44 Accelerating Performance	2	12	4	4	6	2			9	DNS	16	DNS	2010
10	(United States) #17 BGB Motorsports	13	11	15	15	13	12			10	9	14	10	1880
11	(United States) #69 Archangel Motorsports	4	5	8	8	11	9			14	13			1770
12	(United States) #25 Auto Technic Racing	3	3	10	6			3	8					1590
13	(United States) #14 KohR Motorsports	**1**	**1**	14	16	DNS	DNS			DNS	DNS	13	11	1400
14	(United States) #43 Stephen Cameron Racing			**2**	**1**	DNS	**1**			DNS	4			1300
15	(United States) #46 NOLASPORT					4	3			4	DNS	9	DNS	1080
16	(United States) #45 Archangel Motorsports									11	6	7	8	920
17	(United States) #93 CarBahn with Peregrine Racing	8	10	18	17	12	DNS							900
18	(United States) #09 Automatic Racing			16	14			6	4					850
19	(Canada) #98 Multimatic Motorsports	11	7	13	13									800
20	(United States) #26 Auto Technic Racing							**1**	**1**					700
21	(United States) #59 KohR Motorsports			1	18							11	DNS	680
22	(United States) #82 van der Steur Racing									5	5	15	DNS	680
23	(United States) #24 Auto Technic Racing							2	2					640
24	(United States) #48 Accelerating Performance					1	13							530
25	(United States) #89 Split Decision Motorsports											12	9	410
26	(United States) #83 BGB Motorsports			17	12									330

†: Post-event penalty. Car moved to back of class.

=== GSX Manufacturer's Championship ===
Pos.	Drivers	DAY (United States)		SEB (United States)		MOS (Canada)		LIM (United States)		VIR (United States)		ATL (United States)		Points
1	(Germany) BMW	3	3	**2**	**1**	**2**	**1**	**1**	**1**	**1**	**1**	2	**2**	3980
2	(Germany) Porsche	8	2	3	2	1	3	8	7	4	3	**1**	1	3770
3	(United Kingdom) Aston Martin	2	5	4	4	6	2	6	4	5	5	7	8	3560
4	(Germany) Mercedes-AMG	12	4	19	9	5	10	10	DNS	7	10	6	6	3020
5	(United States) Chevrolet	10	14	7	7	14	DNS	7	5	12	8	10	DNS	2710
6	(United States) Ford	**1**	**1**	1	13	DNS	DNS			DNS	DNS	11	11	1810
Pos.	Drivers	DAY (United States)		SEB (United States)		MOS (Canada)		LIM (United States)		VIR (United States)		ATL (United States)		Points
