= IMSA VP Racing SportsCar Challenge =

North American sports car racing series

- Category: Sports car racing
- Country: United States, Canada
- Inaugural season: 2023
- Classes: LMP3, GTDX, GSX, BMC
- Official website: IMSA Official Site

The IMSA VP Racing Sportscar Challenge is a North American auto racing series for LMP3, GT3 (run as the GTDX class), and GT4 (run as the GSX class) vehicles. The series is sanctioned by IMSA and is usually run as support races for the IMSA SportsCar Championship. The series began in 2023 as a replacement for the IMSA Prototype Challenge series.

The IMSA VP Racing Sportscar Challenge retained LMP3 class cars from the Prototype Challenge series, but introduced GT4 cars to allow for multi-class racing. Beginning in 2025, the series introduced a third class, GTDX, open to GT3-specification cars. The series features two 45-minute races per event weekend with no mid-race pit stops or driver changes. The series is designed as a development series for other IMSA series, and as such drivers must have either a silver or bronze categorization from the FIA to participate.

Following the introduction of the Airbnb Endurance Cup in 2026 (where LMP3 prototypes and a one-make class for BMW M2 Racing cars competed in two-hour, multi-driver races on select weekends), IMSA announced a new format for its development series in 2027. Sprint races were abandoned as the series moved to an all-endurance schedule with races ranging in length from 90 minutes to three hours. There will now be three classes as the LMP3 and GSX classes will be joined full-time by the BMW M2 Racing spec class. Each team must field two drivers per race, one of which must be rated Silver or Bronze, and all cars must pit at least once per race for a defined period of time to change drivers. Airbnb will remain as the sponsor of a new points table for Bronze-rated drivers, with the winners in each class receiving prize money plus the top Bronze driver in the LMP3 class also earning a seat at the next season's 24 Hours of Daytona.

The series is currently sponsored by VP Racing Fuels.

== Champions ==
=== Drivers ===
Season	LMP3	GTDX	GSX
2023	(United States) Bijoy Garg	Not Held	(United States) Francis Selldorff
2024	(United States) Steven Aghakhani	Not Held	(United States) Luca Mars
2025	(Germany) Valentino Catalano	(United States) Adam Adelson	(Brazil) Kiko Porto

=== Teams ===
Season	LMP3	GTDX	GSX
2023	(United States) #3 Jr III Racing	Not Held	(United States) #95 Turner Motorsport
2024	(United States) #87 Fast MD Racing with Remstar	Not Held	(United States) #59 KohR Motorsports
2025	(Germany) #30 Gebhardt Motorsport	(United States) #24 Wright Motorsports	(United States) #8 RAFA Racing

=== Manufacturers ===
Season	GTDX	GSX
2023	Not Held	(Germany) BMW
2024	Not Held	(United States) Ford
2025	(Germany) BMW	(Japan) Toyota

== Circuits ==
Red dots: current circuits
Blue dots: former circuits
Purple dots: future circuits

Circuit	Years
(Ontario) Canadian Tire Motorsport Park	2023–2026
(Texas) Circuit of the Americas	2025–2026
(Florida) Daytona International Speedway	2023–2026
(Connecticut) Lime Rock Park	2023, 2027
(Georgia (U.S. state)) Michelin Raceway Road Atlanta	2023–present
Mid-Ohio Sports Car Course	2024–present
(Wisconsin) Road America	2026
(Florida) Sebring International Raceway	2023, 2026
(Florida) St. Petersburg Street Circuit	2024
Virginia International Raceway	2023–2026
(Alabama) Barber Motorsports Park	2027
(New York (state)) Watkins Glen International	2027
