= Brendan Iribe =

American game programmer and founder

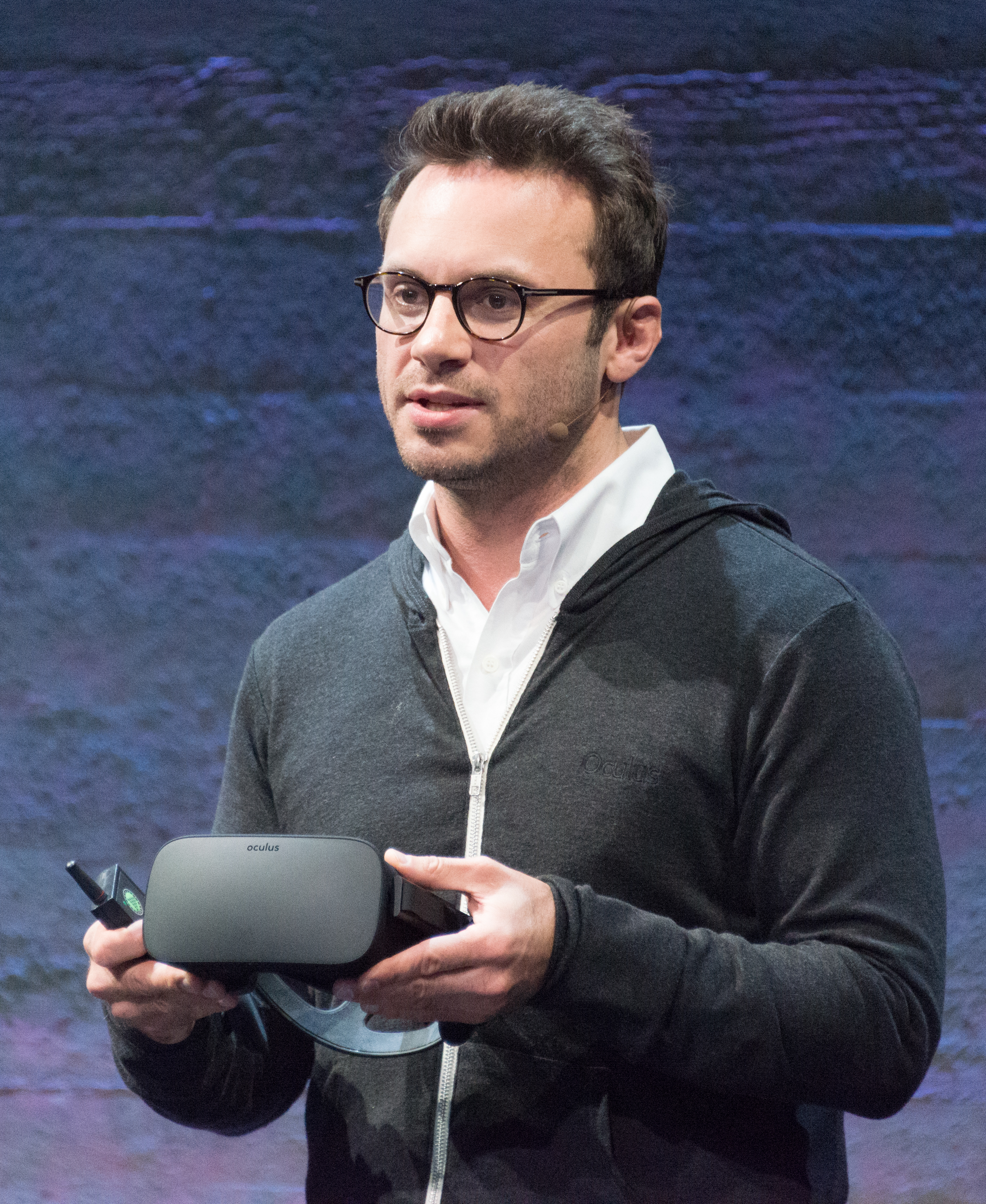
- Iribe holding an Oculus Rift in 2015
- Born: Brendan Trexler Iribe; August 12, 1979 (age 47); Maryland, U.S.
- Education: University of Maryland (dropped out)
- Occupations: Investor; Racing driver
- Categorisation: FIA Bronze
- Known for: CEO of Oculus VR (former)
- Awards: 2023 Bob Akin Award
- Website: brendaniribe.com

Brendan Trexler Iribe (/ˈiːriːb/; born August 12, 1979) is an American game programmer, racing driver, entrepreneur and co-founder of Oculus VR, Inc. and Scaleform. He is the managing partner at BIG Ventures, an early-stage venture fund.

== Early life and education ==
Iribe was born and grew up in Maryland. He graduated from Atholton High School in Howard County, Maryland and then attended the University of Maryland, College Park, majoring in Computer Science which is part of the University of Maryland College of Computer, Mathematical, and Natural Sciences in College Park for two semesters before dropping out to work as a freelance programmer.

== Career ==
Iribe started his career as a game programmer and worked on the user interface of Civilization IV. He was cofounder/CEO of Scaleform, a user interface technology provider for PC games. After Scaleform was sold to Autodesk, he worked as product team lead at Gaikai. In August 2012, he departed Gaikai and became the new CEO of Oculus VR after their Kickstarter campaign for the Oculus Rift VR Headset raised $2.4 million. In December 2016, he stepped down from the role of CEO and decided to lead its newly created PC VR group. In October 2018, Brendan announced in a Facebook post he would be departing Oculus and its parent company Facebook, with no mention of future plans. In December 2018, he invested in Sketchfab, an online platform for 3D and VR content. In June 2023, Iribe co-founded Sesame, a product and research team for AI glasses.

== Philanthropy ==
In 2014 Iribe announced a $31 million dollar donation to his alma mater, University of Maryland, College Park. $30 million was for the Brendan Iribe Center for Computer Science and Engineering, a new building which includes labs for virtual reality, augmented reality, robotics, and artificial intelligence. The remaining $1 million was donated to establish a scholarship fund. Iribe's mother, Elizabeth Iribe, also gave $3 million to set up two endowed chairs in the school's computer science department - the Elizabeth Stevinson Iribe Chair and the Paul Chrisman Iribe Chair (named after her brother).

== Racing record ==
=== Complete WeatherTech SportsCar Championship results ===
Since departing Oculus in 2018, Iribe has focused his time on racing exotic cars manufactured by companies like McLaren and Ferrari.

(key) (Races in bold indicate pole position; results in italics indicate fastest lap)

Year	Team	Class	Make	Engine	1	2	3	4	5	6	7	8	9	10	11	12	Pos.	Points
2021	Inception Racing with Optimum Motorsport	GTD	McLaren 720S GT3	McLaren M840T 4.0L Turbo V8	DAY	SEB	MDO	DET	WGL	WGL	LIM	ELK	LGA	LBH	VIR	PET; 12	63rd	209
2022	Inception Racing	GTD	McLaren 720S GT3	McLaren M840T 4.0L Turbo V8	DAY; 5	SEB; 5	LBH; 9	LGA; 13	MDO; 11	DET	WGL; 2	MOS	LIM	ELK	VIR	PET; 2	12th	1644
2023	Inception Racing	GTD	McLaren 720S GT3 Evo	McLaren M840T 4.0 L Turbo V8	DAY; 3	SEB; 4	LBH; 6	MON; 5	WGL; 15	MOS; 2	LIM; 13	ELK; 2	VIR; 7	IMS; 16	PET; 19		6th	2853
2024	Inception Racing	GTD	McLaren 720S GT3 Evo	McLaren M840T 4.0 L Turbo V8	DAY; 13	SEB; 7	LBH; 17	LGA; 14	WGL; 21	MOS; 3	ELK; 2	VIR; 13					9th	2308
2024	Inception Racing	GTD	Ferrari 296 GT3	Ferrari F163CE 3.0L Turbo V6									IMS; 9	PET; 7			9th	2308
2025	Inception Racing	GTD	Ferrari 296 GT3	Ferrari F163CE 3.0L Turbo V6	DAY; 19	SEB; 4	LBH; 8	LGA; 15	WGL; 2	MOS; 6	ELK; 13	VIR; 11	IMS; 1	PET; 18			10th	2405
2026	Inception Racing	GTD	Ferrari 296 GT3 Evo	Ferrari F163CE 3.0 L Turbo V6	DAY; 13	SEB; 17	LBH; 4	LGA; 3	WGL; 18	MOS; 7	ELK; 8	VIR; 3	IMS; 10	PET; 8			6th	2398

=== Complete 24 Hours of Le Mans results ===
Year	Team	Co-Drivers	Car	Class	Laps	Pos.	Class Pos.
2021	(United Kingdom) Inception Racing	(United Kingdom) Ben Barnicoat (United Kingdom) Ollie Millroy	Ferrari 488 GTE Evo	GTE; Am	327	41st	12th
2022	(Germany) Team Project 1	(United Kingdom) Ben Barnicoat (United Kingdom) Ollie Millroy	Porsche 911 RSR-19	GTE; Am	241	DNF	DNF
2024	(United Kingdom) Inception Racing	(United Kingdom) Ollie Millroy (Denmark) Frederik Schandorff	McLaren 720S GT3 Evo	LMGT3	275	40th	13th
