= 2025 IMSA SportsCar Championship =

Motor racing championship

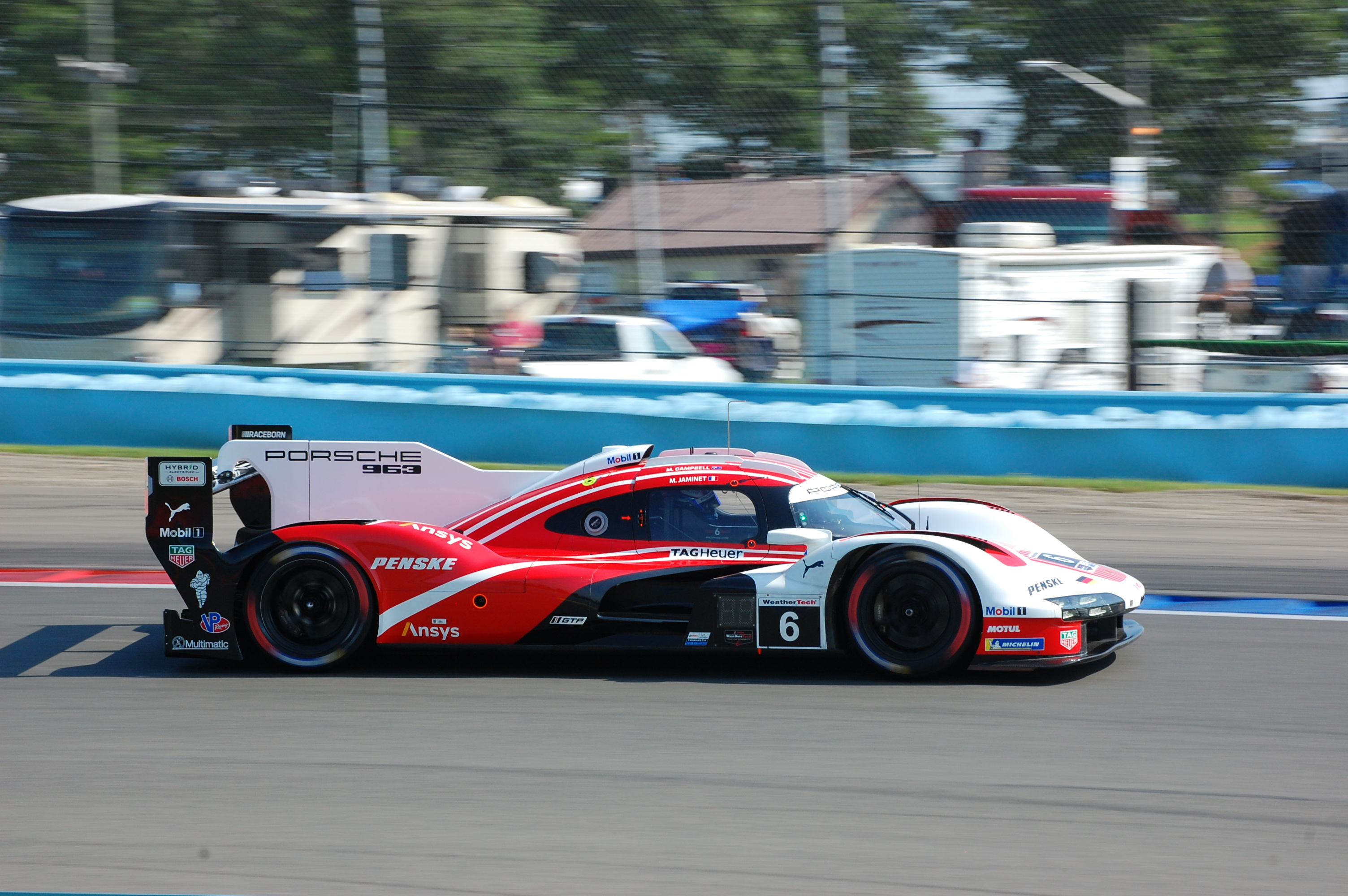
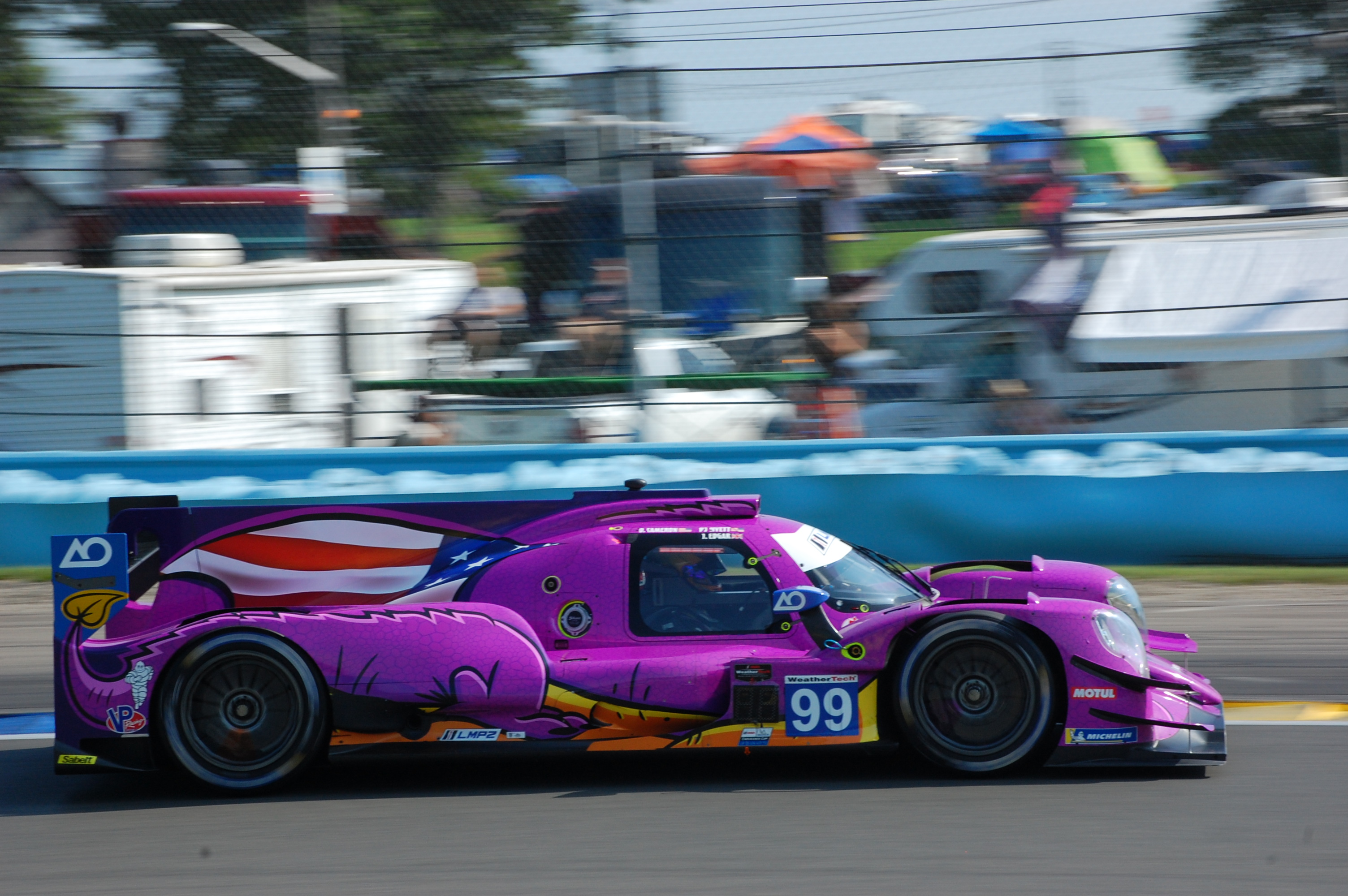
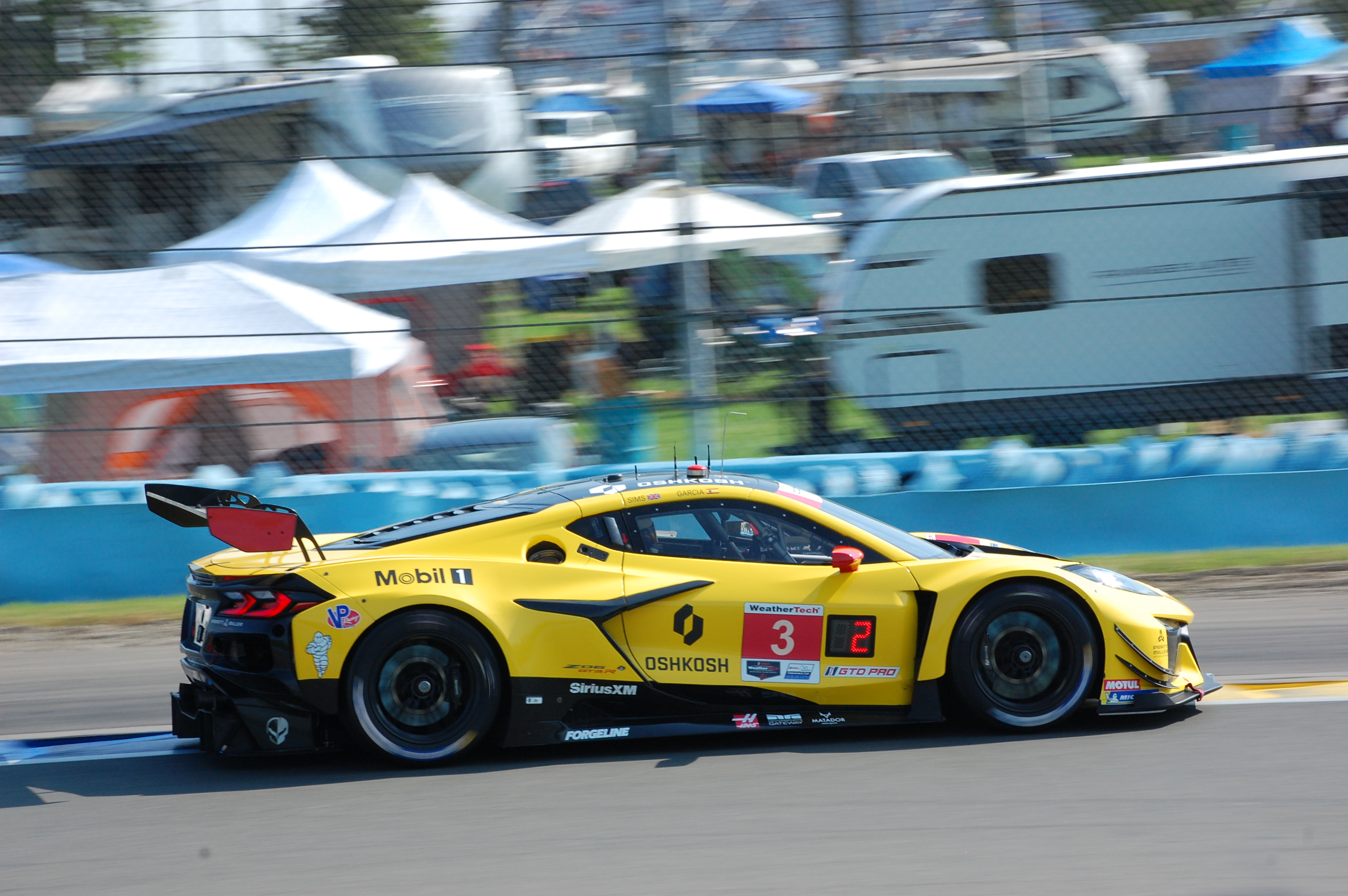
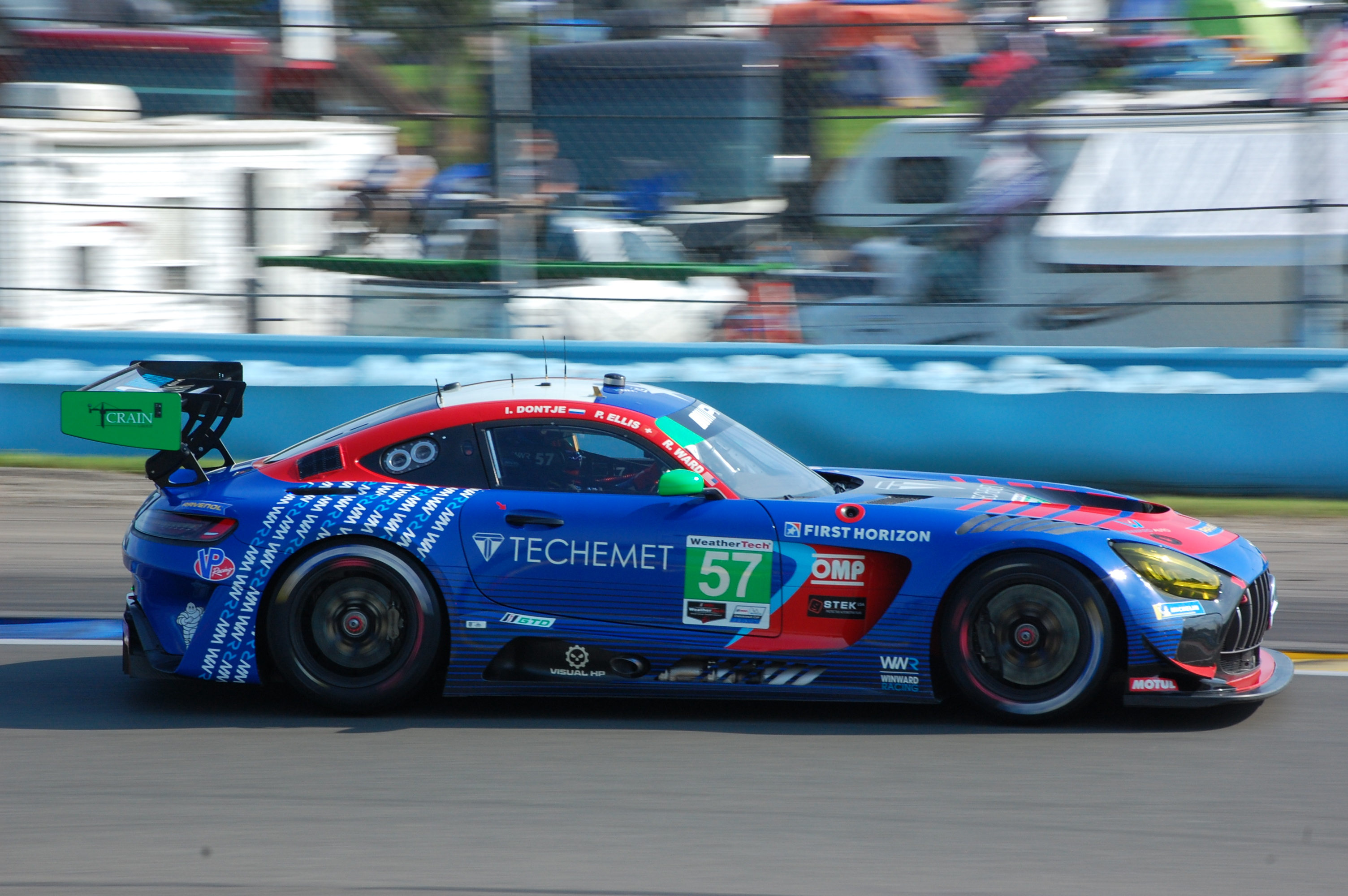
The No. 6 Porsche Penske Motorsport won the GTP Teams' Championship, with Porsche also winning the GTP Manufacturers' Championship. The No. 99 AO Racing won the LMP2 Teams' Championship. The No. 3 Corvette Racing by Pratt Miller Motorsports won the GTD Pro Teams' Championship, with Chevrolet winning the GTD Pro Manufacturers' Championship. The No. 57 Winward Racing won the GTD Teams' Championship, with Mercedes-AMG winning the GTD Manufacturers' Championship.

The 2025 IMSA SportsCar Championship (known for sponsorship reasons as the 2025 IMSA WeatherTech SportsCar Championship) was a motor racing championship and the 55th racing season sanctioned by the International Motor Sports Association, which traced its lineage back to the 1971 IMSA GT Championship. It was also the twelfth season of the IMSA SportsCar Championship since the merger between the American Le Mans Series and the Rolex Sports Car Series in 2014, and the tenth under the sponsorship of WeatherTech.

== Classes ==
- Grand Touring Prototype (GTP) (LMDh and LMH)
- Le Mans Prototype 2 (LMP2)
- GT Daytona Pro (GTD Pro)
- GT Daytona (GTD)

== Schedule ==
The provisional schedule was released on March 15, 2024, and featured an unchanged 11 rounds.

Race is part of the Michelin Endurance Cup

Rnd.	Race	Length	Classes	Circuit	Location	Date
1	Rolex 24 at Daytona	24 hours	All	Daytona International Speedway	Daytona Beach, Florida	January 25–26
2	Mobil 1 Twelve Hours of Sebring	12 hours	All	Sebring International Raceway	Sebring, Florida	March 15
3	Acura Grand Prix of Long Beach	1 hour, 40 minutes	GTP, GTD	Long Beach Street Circuit	Long Beach, California	April 12
4	TireRack.com Monterey SportsCar Championship	2 hours, 40 minutes	GTP, GTD Pro, GTD	WeatherTech Raceway Laguna Seca	Monterey, California	May 11
5	Chevrolet Detroit Sports Car Classic	1 hour, 40 minutes	GTP, GTD Pro	Detroit Street Circuit	Detroit, Michigan	May 31
6	Sahlen's Six Hours of The Glen	6 hours	All	Watkins Glen International	Watkins Glen, New York	June 22
7	Chevrolet Grand Prix	2 hours, 40 minutes	LMP2, GTD Pro, GTD	Canadian Tire Motorsport Park	Bowmanville, Ontario	July 13
8	Motul SportsCar Grand Prix	2 hours, 40 minutes	All	Road America	Elkhart Lake, Wisconsin	August 3
9	Michelin GT Challenge at VIR	2 hours, 40 minutes	GTD Pro, GTD	Virginia International Raceway	Alton, Virginia	August 24
10	Tirerack.com Battle on the Bricks	6 hours	All	Indianapolis Motor Speedway	Speedway, Indiana	September 21
11	Motul Petit Le Mans	10 hours	All	Michelin Raceway Road Atlanta	Braselton, Georgia	October 11

== Entries ==
=== Grand Touring Prototype (GTP) ===
Team	Chassis	Engine	No.	Drivers	Rounds
(Germany) Proton Competition	Porsche 963	Porsche 9RD 4.6 L turbo V8	5	(Switzerland) Neel Jani	1–2, 6
(Germany) Proton Competition	Porsche 963	Porsche 9RD 4.6 L turbo V8	5	(Chile) Nico Pino	1–2, 6
(Germany) Proton Competition	Porsche 963	Porsche 9RD 4.6 L turbo V8	5	(France) Tristan Vautier	1–2
(Germany) Proton Competition	Porsche 963	Porsche 9RD 4.6 L turbo V8	5	(France) Julien Andlauer	1
(Germany) Proton Competition	Porsche 963	Porsche 9RD 4.6 L turbo V8	5	(Argentina) Nicolás Varrone	6
(Germany) Porsche Penske Motorsport	Porsche 963	Porsche 9RD 4.6 L turbo V8	6	(Australia) Matt Campbell	All
(Germany) Porsche Penske Motorsport	Porsche 963	Porsche 9RD 4.6 L turbo V8	6	(France) Mathieu Jaminet	All
(Germany) Porsche Penske Motorsport	Porsche 963	Porsche 9RD 4.6 L turbo V8	6	(France) Kévin Estre	1–2
(Germany) Porsche Penske Motorsport	Porsche 963	Porsche 9RD 4.6 L turbo V8	6	(France) Julien Andlauer	11 (Note: Julien Andlauer was entered for round 11 at Road Atlanta and scored qualifying points, but withdrew on Saturday before the race due to a medical emergency. He was replaced by Laurens Vanthoor, who performed double duty in the two Porsche Penske Motorsport cars.)
(Germany) Porsche Penske Motorsport	Porsche 963	Porsche 9RD 4.6 L turbo V8	6	(Belgium) Laurens Vanthoor	11
(Germany) Porsche Penske Motorsport	Porsche 963	Porsche 9RD 4.6 L turbo V8	7	(Brazil) Felipe Nasr	All
(Germany) Porsche Penske Motorsport	Porsche 963	Porsche 9RD 4.6 L turbo V8	7	(United Kingdom) Nick Tandy	All
(Germany) Porsche Penske Motorsport	Porsche 963	Porsche 9RD 4.6 L turbo V8	7	(Belgium) Laurens Vanthoor	1–2, 11
(United States) Cadillac Wayne Taylor Racing	Cadillac V-Series.R	Cadillac LMC55R 5.5 L V8	10	(Portugal) Filipe Albuquerque	All
(United States) Cadillac Wayne Taylor Racing	Cadillac V-Series.R	Cadillac LMC55R 5.5 L V8	10	(United States) Ricky Taylor	All
(United States) Cadillac Wayne Taylor Racing	Cadillac V-Series.R	Cadillac LMC55R 5.5 L V8	10	(United Kingdom) Will Stevens	1–2, 11
(United States) Cadillac Wayne Taylor Racing	Cadillac V-Series.R	Cadillac LMC55R 5.5 L V8	10	(New Zealand) Brendon Hartley	1
(United States) Cadillac Wayne Taylor Racing	Cadillac V-Series.R	Cadillac LMC55R 5.5 L V8	40	(Switzerland) Louis Delétraz	All
(United States) Cadillac Wayne Taylor Racing	Cadillac V-Series.R	Cadillac LMC55R 5.5 L V8	40	(United States) Jordan Taylor	All
(United States) Cadillac Wayne Taylor Racing	Cadillac V-Series.R	Cadillac LMC55R 5.5 L V8	40	(Japan) Kamui Kobayashi	1
(United States) Cadillac Wayne Taylor Racing	Cadillac V-Series.R	Cadillac LMC55R 5.5 L V8	40	(New Zealand) Brendon Hartley	2
(United States) Cadillac Wayne Taylor Racing	Cadillac V-Series.R	Cadillac LMC55R 5.5 L V8	40	(France) Norman Nato	11
(United States) Aston Martin THOR Team	Aston Martin Valkyrie	Aston Martin RA 6.5 L V12	23	(Canada) Roman De Angelis	2–6, 8, 10–11
(United States) Aston Martin THOR Team	Aston Martin Valkyrie	Aston Martin RA 6.5 L V12	23	(United Kingdom) Ross Gunn	2–6, 8, 10–11
(United States) Aston Martin THOR Team	Aston Martin Valkyrie	Aston Martin RA 6.5 L V12	23	(Spain) Alex Riberas	2, 11
(United States) BMW M Team RLL	BMW M Hybrid V8	BMW P66/3 4.0 L turbo V8	24	(Austria) Philipp Eng	All
(United States) BMW M Team RLL	BMW M Hybrid V8	BMW P66/3 4.0 L turbo V8	24	(Belgium) Dries Vanthoor	All
(United States) BMW M Team RLL	BMW M Hybrid V8	BMW P66/3 4.0 L turbo V8	24	(Denmark) Kevin Magnussen	1–2, 11
(United States) BMW M Team RLL	BMW M Hybrid V8	BMW P66/3 4.0 L turbo V8	24	(Switzerland) Raffaele Marciello	1
(United States) BMW M Team RLL	BMW M Hybrid V8	BMW P66/3 4.0 L turbo V8	25	(South Africa) Sheldon van der Linde	All
(United States) BMW M Team RLL	BMW M Hybrid V8	BMW P66/3 4.0 L turbo V8	25	(Germany) Marco Wittmann	All
(United States) BMW M Team RLL	BMW M Hybrid V8	BMW P66/3 4.0 L turbo V8	25	(Netherlands) Robin Frijns	1–2, 11
(United States) BMW M Team RLL	BMW M Hybrid V8	BMW P66/3 4.0 L turbo V8	25	(Germany) René Rast	1
(United States) Cadillac Whelen	Cadillac V-Series.R	Cadillac LMC55R 5.5 L V8	31	(United Kingdom) Jack Aitken	All
(United States) Cadillac Whelen	Cadillac V-Series.R	Cadillac LMC55R 5.5 L V8	31	(New Zealand) Earl Bamber	1–3, 5–6, 8, 10–11
(United States) Cadillac Whelen	Cadillac V-Series.R	Cadillac LMC55R 5.5 L V8	31	(Denmark) Frederik Vesti	1–2, 4, 6, 10–11
(United States) Cadillac Whelen	Cadillac V-Series.R	Cadillac LMC55R 5.5 L V8	31	(Brazil) Felipe Drugovich	1
(United States) Acura Meyer Shank Racing w/ Curb-Agajanian	Acura ARX-06	Acura AR24e 2.4 L turbo V6	60	(United Kingdom) Tom Blomqvist	All
(United States) Acura Meyer Shank Racing w/ Curb-Agajanian	Acura ARX-06	Acura AR24e 2.4 L turbo V6	60	(United States) Colin Braun	All
(United States) Acura Meyer Shank Racing w/ Curb-Agajanian	Acura ARX-06	Acura AR24e 2.4 L turbo V6	60	(New Zealand) Scott Dixon	1–2, 11
(United States) Acura Meyer Shank Racing w/ Curb-Agajanian	Acura ARX-06	Acura AR24e 2.4 L turbo V6	60	(Sweden) Felix Rosenqvist	1
(United States) Acura Meyer Shank Racing w/ Curb-Agajanian	Acura ARX-06	Acura AR24e 2.4 L turbo V6	93	(United Kingdom) Nick Yelloly	All
(United States) Acura Meyer Shank Racing w/ Curb-Agajanian	Acura ARX-06	Acura AR24e 2.4 L turbo V6	93	(Netherlands) Renger van der Zande	All
(United States) Acura Meyer Shank Racing w/ Curb-Agajanian	Acura ARX-06	Acura AR24e 2.4 L turbo V6	93	(Japan) Kakunoshin Ohta	1, 6, 10
(United States) Acura Meyer Shank Racing w/ Curb-Agajanian	Acura ARX-06	Acura AR24e 2.4 L turbo V6	93	(Spain) Álex Palou	1–2
(United States) Acura Meyer Shank Racing w/ Curb-Agajanian	Acura ARX-06	Acura AR24e 2.4 L turbo V6	93	(France) Tristan Vautier	11
(Italy) Automobili Lamborghini Squadra Corse	Lamborghini SC63	Lamborghini 3.8 L turbo V8	63	(France) Romain Grosjean	1–2, 6, 10–11
(Italy) Automobili Lamborghini Squadra Corse	Lamborghini SC63	Lamborghini 3.8 L turbo V8	63	(Italy) Daniil Kvyat (Note: Kvyat is a Russian driver who competed under a Russian licence at rounds 1–2 and 6 and an Italian licence at round 11.)	1–2, 6, 11
(Italy) Automobili Lamborghini Squadra Corse	Lamborghini SC63	Lamborghini 3.8 L turbo V8	63	(Switzerland) Edoardo Mortara	1, 10–11
(Italy) Automobili Lamborghini Squadra Corse	Lamborghini SC63	Lamborghini 3.8 L turbo V8	63	(Italy) Mirko Bortolotti	1–2
(United States) JDC–Miller MotorSports	Porsche 963	Porsche 9RD 4.6 L turbo V8	85	(Netherlands) Tijmen van der Helm	All
(United States) JDC–Miller MotorSports	Porsche 963	Porsche 9RD 4.6 L turbo V8	85	(Italy) Gianmaria Bruni	1–6, 8
(United States) JDC–Miller MotorSports	Porsche 963	Porsche 9RD 4.6 L turbo V8	85	(Switzerland) Nico Müller	2, 10
(United States) JDC–Miller MotorSports	Porsche 963	Porsche 9RD 4.6 L turbo V8	85	(United States) Bryce Aron	1
(United States) JDC–Miller MotorSports	Porsche 963	Porsche 9RD 4.6 L turbo V8	85	(Germany) Pascal Wehrlein	1
(United States) JDC–Miller MotorSports	Porsche 963	Porsche 9RD 4.6 L turbo V8	85	(United States) Max Esterson	11
(United States) JDC–Miller MotorSports	Porsche 963	Porsche 9RD 4.6 L turbo V8	85	(Switzerland) Neel Jani	11

- Alex Lynn was scheduled to race the No. 40 Wayne Taylor Racing Cadillac at Daytona and Sebring, but withdrew from the former due to an undisclosed illness and was replaced by Brendon Hartley in the latter.

=== Le Mans Prototype 2 (LMP2) ===
In accordance with the 2017 LMP2 regulations, all cars in the LMP2 class use the Gibson GK428 V8 engine.

Team	Chassis	No.	Drivers	Rounds
(United States) CrowdStrike Racing by APR	Oreca 07	04	(United States) George Kurtz	All
(United States) CrowdStrike Racing by APR	Oreca 07	04	(Denmark) Malthe Jakobsen	1–2, 6, 8, 10
(United States) CrowdStrike Racing by APR	Oreca 07	04	(United Kingdom) Toby Sowery	1–2, 6, 10–11
(United States) CrowdStrike Racing by APR	Oreca 07	04	(United Kingdom) Alex Quinn	7, 11
(United States) CrowdStrike Racing by APR	Oreca 07	04	(United States) Colton Herta	1
(United States) United Autosports USA	Oreca 07	2	(United Kingdom) Ben Hanley	All
(United States) United Autosports USA	Oreca 07	2	(United States) Nick Boulle	1–2, 6, 10–11
(United States) United Autosports USA	Oreca 07	2	(United States) Juan Manuel Correa	2, 6, 10–11
(United States) United Autosports USA	Oreca 07	2	(Canada) Phil Fayer	7–8
(United States) United Autosports USA	Oreca 07	2	(United Kingdom) Oliver Jarvis	1
(United States) United Autosports USA	Oreca 07	2	(Australia) Garnet Patterson	1
(United States) United Autosports USA	Oreca 07	22	(United States) Dan Goldburg	All
(United States) United Autosports USA	Oreca 07	22	(United Kingdom) Paul di Resta	1–2, 6, 8, 10–11
(United States) United Autosports USA	Oreca 07	22	(Sweden) Rasmus Lindh	1–2, 6, 10–11
(United States) United Autosports USA	Oreca 07	22	(Australia) James Allen	1
(United States) United Autosports USA	Oreca 07	22	(United Kingdom) Tom Blomqvist	7
(Canada) Tower Motorsports	Oreca 07	8	(Canada) John Farano	All
(Canada) Tower Motorsports	Oreca 07	8	(France) Sébastien Bourdais	1–2, 6, 8, 10–11
(Canada) Tower Motorsports	Oreca 07	8	(Mexico) Sebastián Álvarez	1–2, 6, 10–11
(Canada) Tower Motorsports	Oreca 07	8	(Netherlands) Job van Uitert	1
(Canada) Tower Motorsports	Oreca 07	8	(Netherlands) Renger van der Zande	7
(France) TDS Racing	Oreca 07	11	(United States) Steven Thomas	All
(France) TDS Racing	Oreca 07	11	(New Zealand) Hunter McElrea	1–2, 6–7, 10–11
(France) TDS Racing	Oreca 07	11	(Denmark) Mikkel Jensen	1–2, 6, 8, 10–11
(France) TDS Racing	Oreca 07	11	(France) Charles Milesi	1
(United States) Era Motorsport	Oreca 07	18	(Canada) Tobias Lütke	1–2, 6, 8, 10–11
(United States) Era Motorsport	Oreca 07	18	(Denmark) David Heinemeier Hansson	1–2, 6, 10–11
(United States) Era Motorsport	Oreca 07	18	(France) Paul-Loup Chatin	1, 6
(United States) Era Motorsport	Oreca 07	18	(United Kingdom) Ryan Dalziel	1, 7
(United States) Era Motorsport	Oreca 07	18	(Japan) Kakunoshin Ohta	2, 8
(United States) Era Motorsport	Oreca 07	18	(United Kingdom) Oliver Jarvis	10–11
(United States) Era Motorsport	Oreca 07	18	(Canada) Travis Hill	7
(Poland) Inter Europol Competition	Oreca 07	43	(France) Tom Dillmann	1–2, 6–7, 10–11
(Poland) Inter Europol Competition	Oreca 07	43	(United States) Bijoy Garg	1–2, 6, 10–11
(Poland) Inter Europol Competition	Oreca 07	43	(United States) Jeremy Clarke	2, 6–8, 10–11
(Poland) Inter Europol Competition	Oreca 07	43	(Portugal) António Félix da Costa	1
(Poland) Inter Europol Competition	Oreca 07	43	(United States) Jon Field	1
(Poland) Inter Europol Competition	Oreca 07	43	(United States) Connor De Phillippi	8
(United States) PR1/Mathiasen Motorsports	Oreca 07	52	(Denmark) Benjamin Pedersen	All
(United States) PR1/Mathiasen Motorsports	Oreca 07	52	(Switzerland) Mathias Beche	1–2, 6
(United States) PR1/Mathiasen Motorsports	Oreca 07	52	(United States) Rodrigo Sales	1–2, 6
(United States) PR1/Mathiasen Motorsports	Oreca 07	52	(United States) Naveen Rao	8, 10–11
(United States) PR1/Mathiasen Motorsports	Oreca 07	52	(United States) Logan Sargeant	10–11
(United States) PR1/Mathiasen Motorsports	Oreca 07	52	(United States) Ben Keating	1
(United States) PR1/Mathiasen Motorsports	Oreca 07	52	(United States) Nick Boulle	7
(United States) Team Tonis	Oreca 07	61	(Australia) Matthew Brabham	8
(United States) Team Tonis	Oreca 07	61	(Estonia) Tõnis Kasemets	8
(United States) Pratt Miller Motorsports	Oreca 07	73	(Canada) Chris Cumming	All
(United States) Pratt Miller Motorsports	Oreca 07	73	(Brazil) Pietro Fittipaldi	All
(United States) Pratt Miller Motorsports	Oreca 07	73	(Republic of Ireland) James Roe	1–2, 10–11
(United States) Pratt Miller Motorsports	Oreca 07	73	(United Kingdom) Callum Ilott	1
(United States) Pratt Miller Motorsports	Oreca 07	73	(Portugal) Manuel Espírito Santo	6
(United States) Riley	Oreca 07	74	(Brazil) Felipe Fraga	All
(United States) Riley	Oreca 07	74	(United States) Gar Robinson	All
(United States) Riley	Oreca 07	74	(Australia) Josh Burdon	1–2, 6, 10–11
(United States) Riley	Oreca 07	74	(Brazil) Felipe Massa	1
(United States) JDC–Miller MotorSports	Oreca 07	79	(Australia) Scott Andrews	7–8
(United States) JDC–Miller MotorSports	Oreca 07	79	(United States) Gerry Kraut	7–8
(Italy) AF Corse	Oreca 07	88	(Argentina) Luis Pérez Companc	1–2, 6, 8, 10–11
(Italy) AF Corse	Oreca 07	88	(Argentina) Matías Pérez Companc	2, 6, 8, 10–11
(Italy) AF Corse	Oreca 07	88	(Denmark) Nicklas Nielsen	1–2, 10–11
(Italy) AF Corse	Oreca 07	88	(France) Matthieu Vaxivière	1, 6
(Italy) AF Corse	Oreca 07	88	(United States) Dylan Murry	1
(United States) AO Racing	Oreca 07	99	(United States) Dane Cameron	All
(United States) AO Racing	Oreca 07	99	(United States) P. J. Hyett	All
(United States) AO Racing	Oreca 07	99	(United Kingdom) Jonny Edgar	1–2, 6, 10–11
(United States) AO Racing	Oreca 07	99	(Denmark) Christian Rasmussen	1

=== GT Daytona (GTD Pro / GTD) ===
Team	Chassis	Engine	No.	Drivers	Rounds
GTD Pro
(United States) Heart of Racing Team	Aston Martin Vantage AMR GT3 Evo	Aston Martin M177 4.0 L Turbo V8	007	(Canada) Roman De Angelis	1
(United States) Heart of Racing Team	Aston Martin Vantage AMR GT3 Evo	Aston Martin M177 4.0 L Turbo V8	007	(United Kingdom) Ross Gunn	1
(United States) Heart of Racing Team	Aston Martin Vantage AMR GT3 Evo	Aston Martin M177 4.0 L Turbo V8	007	(Spain) Alex Riberas	1
(United States) Heart of Racing Team	Aston Martin Vantage AMR GT3 Evo	Aston Martin M177 4.0 L Turbo V8	007	(Denmark) Marco Sørensen	1
(United States) Paul Miller Racing	BMW M4 GT3 Evo	BMW P58 3.0 L Twin Turbo I6	1	(United States) Madison Snow	All
(United States) Paul Miller Racing	BMW M4 GT3 Evo	BMW P58 3.0 L Twin Turbo I6	1	(United States) Neil Verhagen	All
(United States) Paul Miller Racing	BMW M4 GT3 Evo	BMW P58 3.0 L Twin Turbo I6	1	(United States) Connor De Phillippi	1–2, 6, 10–11
(United States) Paul Miller Racing	BMW M4 GT3 Evo	BMW P58 3.0 L Twin Turbo I6	1	(South Africa) Kelvin van der Linde	1
(United States) Paul Miller Racing	BMW M4 GT3 Evo	BMW P58 3.0 L Twin Turbo I6	48	(United Kingdom) Dan Harper	All
(United States) Paul Miller Racing	BMW M4 GT3 Evo	BMW P58 3.0 L Twin Turbo I6	48	(Germany) Max Hesse	All
(United States) Paul Miller Racing	BMW M4 GT3 Evo	BMW P58 3.0 L Twin Turbo I6	48	(Finland) Jesse Krohn	1–2
(United States) Paul Miller Racing	BMW M4 GT3 Evo	BMW P58 3.0 L Twin Turbo I6	48	(Brazil) Augusto Farfus	1
(United States) Paul Miller Racing	BMW M4 GT3 Evo	BMW P58 3.0 L Twin Turbo I6	48	(United States) Connor De Phillippi	11
(United States) Corvette Racing by Pratt Miller Motorsports	Chevrolet Corvette Z06 GT3.R	Chevrolet LT6.R 5.5 L V8	3	(Spain) Antonio García	All
(United States) Corvette Racing by Pratt Miller Motorsports	Chevrolet Corvette Z06 GT3.R	Chevrolet LT6.R 5.5 L V8	3	(United Kingdom) Alexander Sims	All
(United States) Corvette Racing by Pratt Miller Motorsports	Chevrolet Corvette Z06 GT3.R	Chevrolet LT6.R 5.5 L V8	3	(Spain) Daniel Juncadella	1–2, 11
(United States) Corvette Racing by Pratt Miller Motorsports	Chevrolet Corvette Z06 GT3.R	Chevrolet LT6.R 5.5 L V8	4	(Netherlands) Nicky Catsburg	All
(United States) Corvette Racing by Pratt Miller Motorsports	Chevrolet Corvette Z06 GT3.R	Chevrolet LT6.R 5.5 L V8	4	(United States) Tommy Milner	All
(United States) Corvette Racing by Pratt Miller Motorsports	Chevrolet Corvette Z06 GT3.R	Chevrolet LT6.R 5.5 L V8	4	(Argentina) Nico Varrone	1–2, 11
(Canada) Pfaff Motorsports	Lamborghini Huracán GT3 Evo 2	Lamborghini DGF 5.2 L V10	9	(Italy) Andrea Caldarelli	All
(Canada) Pfaff Motorsports	Lamborghini Huracán GT3 Evo 2	Lamborghini DGF 5.2 L V10	9	(Italy) Marco Mapelli	1–2, 4–5, 7–11
(Canada) Pfaff Motorsports	Lamborghini Huracán GT3 Evo 2	Lamborghini DGF 5.2 L V10	9	(Canada) James Hinchcliffe	1–2, 11
(Canada) Pfaff Motorsports	Lamborghini Huracán GT3 Evo 2	Lamborghini DGF 5.2 L V10	9	(South Africa) Jordan Pepper	1
(Canada) Pfaff Motorsports	Lamborghini Huracán GT3 Evo 2	Lamborghini DGF 5.2 L V10	9	(United Kingdom) Sandy Mitchell	6
(United States) Vasser Sullivan Racing	Lexus RC F GT3	Toyota 2UR-GSE 5.0 L V8	14	(United States) Aaron Telitz	All
(United States) Vasser Sullivan Racing	Lexus RC F GT3	Toyota 2UR-GSE 5.0 L V8	14	(United Kingdom) Ben Barnicoat	1, 6–11
(United States) Vasser Sullivan Racing	Lexus RC F GT3	Toyota 2UR-GSE 5.0 L V8	14	(United States) Kyle Kirkwood	1–2, 11
(United States) Vasser Sullivan Racing	Lexus RC F GT3	Toyota 2UR-GSE 5.0 L V8	14	(United States) Townsend Bell	1
(United States) Vasser Sullivan Racing	Lexus RC F GT3	Toyota 2UR-GSE 5.0 L V8	14	(Argentina) José María López	2
(United States) Vasser Sullivan Racing	Lexus RC F GT3	Toyota 2UR-GSE 5.0 L V8	14	(Germany) Marvin Kirchhöfer	4
(United States) Vasser Sullivan Racing	Lexus RC F GT3	Toyota 2UR-GSE 5.0 L V8	14	(United Kingdom) Jack Hawksworth	5
(United States) Vasser Sullivan Racing	Lexus RC F GT3	Toyota 2UR-GSE 5.0 L V8	15	(United States) Frankie Montecalvo	5
(United States) Vasser Sullivan Racing	Lexus RC F GT3	Toyota 2UR-GSE 5.0 L V8	15	(Canada) Parker Thompson	5
(Germany) Proton Competition	Porsche 911 GT3 R (992)	Porsche M97/80 4.2 L Flat-6	20	(Italy) Matteo Cressoni	1–2
(Germany) Proton Competition	Porsche 911 GT3 R (992)	Porsche M97/80 4.2 L Flat-6	20	(Austria) Richard Lietz	1–2
(Germany) Proton Competition	Porsche 911 GT3 R (992)	Porsche M97/80 4.2 L Flat-6	20	(Italy) Claudio Schiavoni	1–2
(Germany) Proton Competition	Porsche 911 GT3 R (992)	Porsche M97/80 4.2 L Flat-6	20	(Austria) Thomas Preining	1
(Canada) Ford Multimatic Motorsports	Ford Mustang GT3	Ford Coyote 5.4 L V8	64	(United Kingdom) Sebastian Priaulx	All
(Canada) Ford Multimatic Motorsports	Ford Mustang GT3	Ford Coyote 5.4 L V8	64	(Germany) Mike Rockenfeller	All
(Canada) Ford Multimatic Motorsports	Ford Mustang GT3	Ford Coyote 5.4 L V8	64	(United Kingdom) Ben Barker	2, 11
(Canada) Ford Multimatic Motorsports	Ford Mustang GT3	Ford Coyote 5.4 L V8	64	(United States) Austin Cindric	1
(Canada) Ford Multimatic Motorsports	Ford Mustang GT3	Ford Coyote 5.4 L V8	65	(Germany) Christopher Mies	All
(Canada) Ford Multimatic Motorsports	Ford Mustang GT3	Ford Coyote 5.4 L V8	65	(Belgium) Frédéric Vervisch	All
(Canada) Ford Multimatic Motorsports	Ford Mustang GT3	Ford Coyote 5.4 L V8	65	(Norway) Dennis Olsen	1–2, 11
(Germany) GetSpeed Performance	Mercedes-AMG GT3 Evo	Mercedes-AMG M159 6.2 L V8	69	(United States) Anthony Bartone	1
(Germany) GetSpeed Performance	Mercedes-AMG GT3 Evo	Mercedes-AMG M159 6.2 L V8	69	(Belgium) Maxime Martin	1
(Germany) GetSpeed Performance	Mercedes-AMG GT3 Evo	Mercedes-AMG M159 6.2 L V8	69	(Germany) Fabian Schiller	1
(Germany) GetSpeed Performance	Mercedes-AMG GT3 Evo	Mercedes-AMG M159 6.2 L V8	69	(Germany) Luca Stolz	1
(Australia) 75 Express	Mercedes-AMG GT3 Evo	Mercedes-AMG M159 6.2 L V8	75	(Canada) Mikaël Grenier	1, 10
(Australia) 75 Express	Mercedes-AMG GT3 Evo	Mercedes-AMG M159 6.2 L V8	75	(Australia) Kenny Habul	1, 10
(Australia) 75 Express	Mercedes-AMG GT3 Evo	Mercedes-AMG M159 6.2 L V8	75	(Germany) Maro Engel	1
(Australia) 75 Express	Mercedes-AMG GT3 Evo	Mercedes-AMG M159 6.2 L V8	75	(Andorra) Jules Gounon	1
(Australia) 75 Express	Mercedes-AMG GT3 Evo	Mercedes-AMG M159 6.2 L V8	75	(Australia) Broc Feeney	10
(United States) AO Racing	Porsche 911 GT3 R (992)	Porsche M97/80 4.2 L Flat-6	77	(Austria) Klaus Bachler	All
(United States) AO Racing	Porsche 911 GT3 R (992)	Porsche M97/80 4.2 L Flat-6	77	(Germany) Laurin Heinrich	All
(United States) AO Racing	Porsche 911 GT3 R (992)	Porsche M97/80 4.2 L Flat-6	77	(Belgium) Alessio Picariello	1–2
(United States) AO Racing	Porsche 911 GT3 R (992)	Porsche M97/80 4.2 L Flat-6	77	(Denmark) Michael Christensen	11
(United States) DragonSpeed	Ferrari 296 GT3	Ferrari F163CE 3.0 L Turbo V6	81	(Spain) Albert Costa	All
(United States) DragonSpeed	Ferrari 296 GT3	Ferrari F163CE 3.0 L Turbo V6	81	(Italy) Giacomo Altoè	2, 4, 7–9, 11
(United States) DragonSpeed	Ferrari 296 GT3	Ferrari F163CE 3.0 L Turbo V6	81	(Italy) Davide Rigon	1–2, 6, 10–11
(United States) DragonSpeed	Ferrari 296 GT3	Ferrari F163CE 3.0 L Turbo V6	81	(Spain) Miguel Molina	1
(United States) DragonSpeed	Ferrari 296 GT3	Ferrari F163CE 3.0 L Turbo V6	81	(France) Thomas Neubauer	1
(United States) DragonSpeed	Ferrari 296 GT3	Ferrari F163CE 3.0 L Turbo V6	81	(Sweden) Rasmus Lindh	5
(United States) Trackhouse by TF Sport	Chevrolet Corvette Z06 GT3.R	Chevrolet LT6 5.5 L V8	91	(New Zealand) Shane van Gisbergen	1
(United States) Trackhouse by TF Sport	Chevrolet Corvette Z06 GT3.R	Chevrolet LT6 5.5 L V8	91	(United States) Ben Keating	1
(United States) Trackhouse by TF Sport	Chevrolet Corvette Z06 GT3.R	Chevrolet LT6 5.5 L V8	91	(New Zealand) Scott McLaughlin	1
(United States) Trackhouse by TF Sport	Chevrolet Corvette Z06 GT3.R	Chevrolet LT6 5.5 L V8	91	(United States) Connor Zilisch	1
GTD
(United States) Triarsi Competizione	Ferrari 296 GT3	Ferrari F163CE 3.0 L Turbo V6	021	(United Kingdom) Stevan McAleer	1–4
(United States) Triarsi Competizione	Ferrari 296 GT3	Ferrari F163CE 3.0 L Turbo V6	021	(United States) Sheena Monk	1–4
(United States) Triarsi Competizione	Ferrari 296 GT3	Ferrari F163CE 3.0 L Turbo V6	021	(United States) AJ Muss	6, 10–11
(United States) Triarsi Competizione	Ferrari 296 GT3	Ferrari F163CE 3.0 L Turbo V6	021	(United States) Kenton Koch	7–9
(United States) Triarsi Competizione	Ferrari 296 GT3	Ferrari F163CE 3.0 L Turbo V6	021	(United States) Onofrio Triarsi	7–9
(United States) Triarsi Competizione	Ferrari 296 GT3	Ferrari F163CE 3.0 L Turbo V6	021	(United States) Mike Skeen	1–2
(United States) Triarsi Competizione	Ferrari 296 GT3	Ferrari F163CE 3.0 L Turbo V6	021	(United Kingdom) James Calado	1
(United States) Triarsi Competizione	Ferrari 296 GT3	Ferrari F163CE 3.0 L Turbo V6	021	(Italy) Alessandro Balzan	6
(United States) Triarsi Competizione	Ferrari 296 GT3	Ferrari F163CE 3.0 L Turbo V6	021	(United States) Jason Hart	6
(United States) Triarsi Competizione	Ferrari 296 GT3	Ferrari F163CE 3.0 L Turbo V6	021	(United States) Joel Miller	10
(United States) Triarsi Competizione	Ferrari 296 GT3	Ferrari F163CE 3.0 L Turbo V6	021	(Italy) Niccolò Schirò	10
(United States) Triarsi Competizione	Ferrari 296 GT3	Ferrari F163CE 3.0 L Turbo V6	021	(Italy) Riccardo Agostini	11
(United States) Triarsi Competizione	Ferrari 296 GT3	Ferrari F163CE 3.0 L Turbo V6	021	(United States) Robert Megennis	11
(United States) Triarsi Competizione	Ferrari 296 GT3	Ferrari F163CE 3.0 L Turbo V6	023	(United States) Onofrio Triarsi	1–2, 4, 6, 10–11
(United States) Triarsi Competizione	Ferrari 296 GT3	Ferrari F163CE 3.0 L Turbo V6	023	(United Kingdom) James Calado	6, 10–11
(United States) Triarsi Competizione	Ferrari 296 GT3	Ferrari F163CE 3.0 L Turbo V6	023	(Italy) Alessio Rovera	1–2
(United States) Triarsi Competizione	Ferrari 296 GT3	Ferrari F163CE 3.0 L Turbo V6	023	(United States) Charlie Scardina	1–2
(United States) Triarsi Competizione	Ferrari 296 GT3	Ferrari F163CE 3.0 L Turbo V6	023	(United States) Kenton Koch	10–11
(United States) Triarsi Competizione	Ferrari 296 GT3	Ferrari F163CE 3.0 L Turbo V6	023	(Italy) Eddie Cheever III	1
(United States) Triarsi Competizione	Ferrari 296 GT3	Ferrari F163CE 3.0 L Turbo V6	023	(Italy) Riccardo Agostini	4
(United States) Triarsi Competizione	Ferrari 296 GT3	Ferrari F163CE 3.0 L Turbo V6	023	(New Zealand) Andrew Waite	6
(United States) Vasser Sullivan Racing	Lexus RC F GT3	Toyota 2UR-GSE 5.0 L V8	12	(United Kingdom) Jack Hawksworth	All
(United States) Vasser Sullivan Racing	Lexus RC F GT3	Toyota 2UR-GSE 5.0 L V8	12	(Canada) Parker Thompson	All
(United States) Vasser Sullivan Racing	Lexus RC F GT3	Toyota 2UR-GSE 5.0 L V8	12	(United States) Frankie Montecalvo	1–2, 6, 10–11
(United States) Vasser Sullivan Racing	Lexus RC F GT3	Toyota 2UR-GSE 5.0 L V8	12	(United States) Kyle Kirkwood	1
(United States) Vasser Sullivan Racing	Lexus RC F GT3	Toyota 2UR-GSE 5.0 L V8	89	(United States) Frankie Montecalvo	3
(United States) Vasser Sullivan Racing	Lexus RC F GT3	Toyota 2UR-GSE 5.0 L V8	89	(United States) Aaron Telitz	3
(Canada) AWA	Chevrolet Corvette Z06 GT3.R	Chevrolet LT6 5.5 L V8	13	(United Kingdom) Matt Bell	All
(Canada) AWA	Chevrolet Corvette Z06 GT3.R	Chevrolet LT6 5.5 L V8	13	(Canada) Orey Fidani	All
(Canada) AWA	Chevrolet Corvette Z06 GT3.R	Chevrolet LT6 5.5 L V8	13	(Germany) Lars Kern	1–2, 6, 10–11
(Canada) AWA	Chevrolet Corvette Z06 GT3.R	Chevrolet LT6 5.5 L V8	13	(Germany) Marvin Kirchhöfer	1
(United States) van der Steur Racing	Aston Martin Vantage AMR GT3 Evo	Aston Martin M177 4.0 L Turbo V8	19	(France) Valentin Hasse-Clot	1–2, 6, 10–11
(United States) van der Steur Racing	Aston Martin Vantage AMR GT3 Evo	Aston Martin M177 4.0 L Turbo V8	19	(United States) Anthony McIntosh	1–2, 6, 10–11
(United States) van der Steur Racing	Aston Martin Vantage AMR GT3 Evo	Aston Martin M177 4.0 L Turbo V8	19	(United States) Rory van der Steur	1–2, 6, 11
(United States) van der Steur Racing	Aston Martin Vantage AMR GT3 Evo	Aston Martin M177 4.0 L Turbo V8	19	(France) Maxime Robin	1
(United States) van der Steur Racing	Aston Martin Vantage AMR GT3 Evo	Aston Martin M177 4.0 L Turbo V8	19	(Brazil) Eduardo Barrichello	10
(Italy) AF Corse	Ferrari 296 GT3	Ferrari F163CE 3.0 L Turbo V6	21	(United States) Simon Mann	1–2, 6, 10–11
(Italy) AF Corse	Ferrari 296 GT3	Ferrari F163CE 3.0 L Turbo V6	21	(Italy) Alessandro Pier Guidi	1–2, 6, 10–11
(Italy) AF Corse	Ferrari 296 GT3	Ferrari F163CE 3.0 L Turbo V6	21	(France) Lilou Wadoux	1–2, 6, 10–11
(Italy) AF Corse	Ferrari 296 GT3	Ferrari F163CE 3.0 L Turbo V6	21	(Japan) Kei Cozzolino	1
(Italy) AF Corse	Ferrari 296 GT3	Ferrari F163CE 3.0 L Turbo V6	50	(Italy) Riccardo Agostini	1
(Italy) AF Corse	Ferrari 296 GT3	Ferrari F163CE 3.0 L Turbo V6	50	(Denmark) Conrad Laursen	1
(Italy) AF Corse	Ferrari 296 GT3	Ferrari F163CE 3.0 L Turbo V6	50	(Monaco) Arthur Leclerc	1
(Italy) AF Corse	Ferrari 296 GT3	Ferrari F163CE 3.0 L Turbo V6	50	(Brazil) Custodio Toledo	1
(Italy) Cetilar Racing	Ferrari 296 GT3	Ferrari F163CE 3.0 L Turbo V6	47	(Italy) Lorenzo Patrese	1–2, 6, 10–11
(Italy) Cetilar Racing	Ferrari 296 GT3	Ferrari F163CE 3.0 L Turbo V6	47	(Italy) Antonio Fuoco	1–2, 6, 10
(Italy) Cetilar Racing	Ferrari 296 GT3	Ferrari F163CE 3.0 L Turbo V6	47	(Italy) Nicola Lacorte	1, 10
(Italy) Cetilar Racing	Ferrari 296 GT3	Ferrari F163CE 3.0 L Turbo V6	47	(Italy) Roberto Lacorte	1, 11
(Italy) Cetilar Racing	Ferrari 296 GT3	Ferrari F163CE 3.0 L Turbo V6	47	(Italy) Giorgio Sernagiotto	2, 6
(Italy) Cetilar Racing	Ferrari 296 GT3	Ferrari F163CE 3.0 L Turbo V6	47	(Spain) Miguel Molina	11
(United States) Heart of Racing Team	Aston Martin Vantage AMR GT3 Evo	Aston Martin M177 4.0 L Turbo V8	27	(United Kingdom) Casper Stevenson	All
(United States) Heart of Racing Team	Aston Martin Vantage AMR GT3 Evo	Aston Martin M177 4.0 L Turbo V8	27	(United Kingdom) Tom Gamble	1–3, 6, 8–11
(United States) Heart of Racing Team	Aston Martin Vantage AMR GT3 Evo	Aston Martin M177 4.0 L Turbo V8	27	(Canada) Zacharie Robichon	1–2, 6, 10–11
(United States) Heart of Racing Team	Aston Martin Vantage AMR GT3 Evo	Aston Martin M177 4.0 L Turbo V8	27	(Italy) Mattia Drudi	1
(United States) Heart of Racing Team	Aston Martin Vantage AMR GT3 Evo	Aston Martin M177 4.0 L Turbo V8	27	(United Kingdom) Darren Turner	4
(United States) Heart of Racing Team	Aston Martin Vantage AMR GT3 Evo	Aston Martin M177 4.0 L Turbo V8	27	(Canada) Roman De Angelis	7
(United States) Korthoff Competition Motors	Mercedes-AMG GT3 Evo	Mercedes-AMG M159 6.2 L V8	32	(United States) Kenton Koch	1–4, 6
(United States) Korthoff Competition Motors	Mercedes-AMG GT3 Evo	Mercedes-AMG M159 6.2 L V8	32	(United States) Seth Lucas	1–4
(United States) Korthoff Competition Motors	Mercedes-AMG GT3 Evo	Mercedes-AMG M159 6.2 L V8	32	(Germany) Maximilian Götz	1–2
(United States) Korthoff Competition Motors	Mercedes-AMG GT3 Evo	Mercedes-AMG M159 6.2 L V8	32	(Canada) Daniel Morad	1, 6
(United States) Korthoff Competition Motors	Mercedes-AMG GT3 Evo	Mercedes-AMG M159 6.2 L V8	32	(South Africa) Mikey Taylor	6
(United States) Conquest Racing	Ferrari 296 GT3	Ferrari F163CE 3.0 L Turbo V6	34	(United States) Manny Franco	All
(United States) Conquest Racing	Ferrari 296 GT3	Ferrari F163CE 3.0 L Turbo V6	34	(Brazil) Daniel Serra	All
(United States) Conquest Racing	Ferrari 296 GT3	Ferrari F163CE 3.0 L Turbo V6	34	(Monaco) Cédric Sbirrazzuoli	1–2
(United States) Conquest Racing	Ferrari 296 GT3	Ferrari F163CE 3.0 L Turbo V6	34	(United Kingdom) Ben Tuck	6, 10
(United States) Conquest Racing	Ferrari 296 GT3	Ferrari F163CE 3.0 L Turbo V6	34	(Italy) Giacomo Altoè	1
(United States) Conquest Racing	Ferrari 296 GT3	Ferrari F163CE 3.0 L Turbo V6	34	(United States) Mike Skeen	11
(United States) DXDT Racing	Chevrolet Corvette Z06 GT3.R	Chevrolet LT6 5.5 L V8	36	(United States) Alec Udell	1–2, 4, 6–11
(United States) DXDT Racing	Chevrolet Corvette Z06 GT3.R	Chevrolet LT6 5.5 L V8	36	(Republic of Ireland) Charlie Eastwood	1–2, 6, 10–11
(United States) DXDT Racing	Chevrolet Corvette Z06 GT3.R	Chevrolet LT6 5.5 L V8	36	(Turkey) Salih Yoluç	1–2, 6, 10–11
(United States) DXDT Racing	Chevrolet Corvette Z06 GT3.R	Chevrolet LT6 5.5 L V8	36	(Canada) Robert Wickens	3–4, 7–9
(United States) DXDT Racing	Chevrolet Corvette Z06 GT3.R	Chevrolet LT6 5.5 L V8	36	(Brazil) Pipo Derani	1
(United States) DXDT Racing	Chevrolet Corvette Z06 GT3.R	Chevrolet LT6 5.5 L V8	36	(United States) Tommy Milner	3
(United States) Magnus Racing	Aston Martin Vantage AMR GT3 Evo	Aston Martin M177 4.0 L Turbo V8	44	(United States) John Potter	1, 6, 11
(United States) Magnus Racing	Aston Martin Vantage AMR GT3 Evo	Aston Martin M177 4.0 L Turbo V8	44	(United States) Spencer Pumpelly	1, 6, 11
(United States) Magnus Racing	Aston Martin Vantage AMR GT3 Evo	Aston Martin M177 4.0 L Turbo V8	44	(United States) Andy Lally	1
(United States) Magnus Racing	Aston Martin Vantage AMR GT3 Evo	Aston Martin M177 4.0 L Turbo V8	44	(Denmark) Nicki Thiim	1
(United States) Magnus Racing	Aston Martin Vantage AMR GT3 Evo	Aston Martin M177 4.0 L Turbo V8	44	(Denmark) Marco Sørensen	6
(United States) Magnus Racing	Aston Martin Vantage AMR GT3 Evo	Aston Martin M177 4.0 L Turbo V8	44	(Belgium) Jan Heylen	11
(United States) Wayne Taylor Racing	Lamborghini Huracán GT3 Evo 2	Lamborghini DGF 5.2 L V10	45	(Costa Rica) Danny Formal	All
(United States) Wayne Taylor Racing	Lamborghini Huracán GT3 Evo 2	Lamborghini DGF 5.2 L V10	45	(United States) Trent Hindman	All
(United States) Wayne Taylor Racing	Lamborghini Huracán GT3 Evo 2	Lamborghini DGF 5.2 L V10	45	(United States) Graham Doyle	1–2, 6, 10–11
(United States) Wayne Taylor Racing	Lamborghini Huracán GT3 Evo 2	Lamborghini DGF 5.2 L V10	45	(Canada) Kyle Marcelli	1
(United States) Winward Racing	Mercedes-AMG GT3 Evo	Mercedes-AMG M159 6.2 L V8	57	(Switzerland) Philip Ellis	All
(United States) Winward Racing	Mercedes-AMG GT3 Evo	Mercedes-AMG M159 6.2 L V8	57	(United States) Russell Ward	All
(United States) Winward Racing	Mercedes-AMG GT3 Evo	Mercedes-AMG M159 6.2 L V8	57	(Netherlands) Indy Dontje	1–2, 6, 10–11
(United States) Winward Racing	Mercedes-AMG GT3 Evo	Mercedes-AMG M159 6.2 L V8	57	(Austria) Lucas Auer	1
(United States) Gradient Racing	Ford Mustang GT3	Ford Coyote 5.4 L V8	66	(United Kingdom) Till Bechtolsheimer	1–2, 6, 10–11
(United States) Gradient Racing	Ford Mustang GT3	Ford Coyote 5.4 L V8	66	(United States) Joey Hand	1–2, 6, 10–11
(United States) Gradient Racing	Ford Mustang GT3	Ford Coyote 5.4 L V8	66	(United States) Jenson Altzman	3–4, 7–9
(United States) Gradient Racing	Ford Mustang GT3	Ford Coyote 5.4 L V8	66	(United States) Robert Megennis	3–4, 7–9
(United States) Gradient Racing	Ford Mustang GT3	Ford Coyote 5.4 L V8	66	(Colombia) Tatiana Calderón	1–2, 6
(United States) Gradient Racing	Ford Mustang GT3	Ford Coyote 5.4 L V8	66	(United States) Mason Filippi	10–11
(United States) Gradient Racing	Ford Mustang GT3	Ford Coyote 5.4 L V8	66	(United Kingdom) Harry Tincknell	1
(United Kingdom) Inception Racing	Ferrari 296 GT3	Ferrari F163CE 3.0 L Turbo V6	70	(United States) Brendan Iribe	All
(United Kingdom) Inception Racing	Ferrari 296 GT3	Ferrari F163CE 3.0 L Turbo V6	70	(Denmark) Frederik Schandorff	All
(United Kingdom) Inception Racing	Ferrari 296 GT3	Ferrari F163CE 3.0 L Turbo V6	70	(United Kingdom) Ollie Millroy	1–2, 6, 10–11
(United Kingdom) Inception Racing	Ferrari 296 GT3	Ferrari F163CE 3.0 L Turbo V6	70	(Italy) David Fumanelli	1
(United States) Forte Racing	Lamborghini Huracán GT3 Evo 2	Lamborghini DGF 5.2 L V10	78	(Germany) Mario Farnbacher	All
(United States) Forte Racing	Lamborghini Huracán GT3 Evo 2	Lamborghini DGF 5.2 L V10	78	(Canada) Misha Goikhberg	All
(United States) Forte Racing	Lamborghini Huracán GT3 Evo 2	Lamborghini DGF 5.2 L V10	78	(United States) Parker Kligerman	1–2
(United States) Forte Racing	Lamborghini Huracán GT3 Evo 2	Lamborghini DGF 5.2 L V10	78	(United States) Eric Filgueiras	10–11
(United States) Forte Racing	Lamborghini Huracán GT3 Evo 2	Lamborghini DGF 5.2 L V10	78	(France) Franck Perera	1
(United States) Forte Racing	Lamborghini Huracán GT3 Evo 2	Lamborghini DGF 5.2 L V10	78	(Canada) Scott Hargrove	6
(United States) Lone Star Racing	Mercedes-AMG GT3 Evo	Mercedes-AMG M159 6.2 L V8	80	(Australia) Scott Andrews	1–2, 6, 10–11
(United States) Lone Star Racing	Mercedes-AMG GT3 Evo	Mercedes-AMG M159 6.2 L V8	80	(United States) Dan Knox	1–2, 6
(United States) Lone Star Racing	Mercedes-AMG GT3 Evo	Mercedes-AMG M159 6.2 L V8	80	(United States) Wyatt Brichacek	6, 10–11
(United States) Lone Star Racing	Mercedes-AMG GT3 Evo	Mercedes-AMG M159 6.2 L V8	80	(United States) Eric Filgueiras	1–2
(United States) Lone Star Racing	Mercedes-AMG GT3 Evo	Mercedes-AMG M159 6.2 L V8	80	(Estonia) Ralf Aron	1
(United States) Lone Star Racing	Mercedes-AMG GT3 Evo	Mercedes-AMG M159 6.2 L V8	80	(Netherlands) Lin Hodenius	10–11
(Italy) Iron Dames	Porsche 911 GT3 R (992)	Porsche M97/80 4.2 L Flat-6	83	(Belgium) Sarah Bovy	1–2
(Italy) Iron Dames	Porsche 911 GT3 R (992)	Porsche M97/80 4.2 L Flat-6	83	(Switzerland) Rahel Frey	1–2
(Italy) Iron Dames	Porsche 911 GT3 R (992)	Porsche M97/80 4.2 L Flat-6	83	(Denmark) Michelle Gatting	1–2
(Italy) Iron Dames	Porsche 911 GT3 R (992)	Porsche M97/80 4.2 L Flat-6	83	(Switzerland) Karen Gaillard	1
(United States) Turner Motorsport	BMW M4 GT3 Evo	BMW P58 3.0 L Turbo I6	96	(United States) Robby Foley	All
(United States) Turner Motorsport	BMW M4 GT3 Evo	BMW P58 3.0 L Turbo I6	96	(United States) Patrick Gallagher	All
(United States) Turner Motorsport	BMW M4 GT3 Evo	BMW P58 3.0 L Turbo I6	96	(United States) Jake Walker	1–2, 6, 10–11
(United States) Turner Motorsport	BMW M4 GT3 Evo	BMW P58 3.0 L Turbo I6	96	(Germany) Jens Klingmann	1
(United States) Wright Motorsports	Porsche 911 GT3 R (992)	Porsche M97/80 4.2 L Flat-6	120	(United States) Adam Adelson	All
(United States) Wright Motorsports	Porsche 911 GT3 R (992)	Porsche M97/80 4.2 L Flat-6	120	(United States) Elliott Skeer	All
(United States) Wright Motorsports	Porsche 911 GT3 R (992)	Porsche M97/80 4.2 L Flat-6	120	(Australia) Tom Sargent	1–2, 6, 10–11
(United States) Wright Motorsports	Porsche 911 GT3 R (992)	Porsche M97/80 4.2 L Flat-6	120	(Turkey) Ayhancan Güven	1
(United States) AO Racing	Porsche 911 GT3 R (992)	Porsche M97/80 4.2 L Flat-6	177	(United Kingdom) Jonny Edgar	3
(United States) AO Racing	Porsche 911 GT3 R (992)	Porsche M97/80 4.2 L Flat-6	177	(Belgium) Laurens Vanthoor	3

== Race results ==
Bold indicates overall and GTD winners.

Rnd	Circuit	GTP Winning Team	LMP2 Winning Team	GTD Pro Winning Team	GTD Winning Team	Report
Rnd	Circuit	GTP Winning Drivers	LMP2 Winning Drivers	GTD Pro Winning Drivers	GTD Winning Drivers	Report
1	Daytona	**(Germany) #7 Porsche Penske Motorsport**	(United States) #22 United Autosports USA (Note: Tower Motorsports had won the Rolex 24 at Daytona with Sebastián Álvarez, Sébastien Bourdais, John Farano and Job van Uitert, before being disqualified for exceeding the maximum allowable wear to the regulated area of the skid block on the underside of the car, which is set at 5mm by FIA technical regulations.)	**(Canada) #65 Ford Multimatic Motorsports**	(Canada) #13 AWA	Report
1	Daytona	**(Brazil) Felipe Nasr** **(United Kingdom) Nick Tandy** **(Belgium) Laurens Vanthoor**	(Australia) James Allen (United Kingdom) Paul di Resta (United States) Dan Goldburg (Sweden) Rasmus Lindh	**(Germany) Christopher Mies** **(Norway) Dennis Olsen** **(Belgium) Frédéric Vervisch**	(United Kingdom) Matt Bell (Canada) Orey Fidani (Germany) Lars Kern (Germany) Marvin Kirchhöfer	Report
2	Sebring	**(Germany) #7 Porsche Penske Motorsport**	(Poland) #43 Inter Europol Competition	**(United States) #77 AO Racing**	(United States) #57 Winward Racing	Report
2	Sebring	**(Brazil) Felipe Nasr** **(United Kingdom) Nick Tandy** **(Belgium) Laurens Vanthoor**	(United States) Jeremy Clarke (France) Tom Dillmann (United States) Bijoy Garg	**(Austria) Klaus Bachler** **(Germany) Laurin Heinrich** **(Belgium) Alessio Picariello**	(Netherlands) Indy Dontje (Switzerland) Philip Ellis (United States) Russell Ward	Report
3	Long Beach	**(Germany) #7 Porsche Penske Motorsport**	did not participate	did not participate	**(United States) #177 AO Racing**	Report
3	Long Beach	**(Brazil) Felipe Nasr** **(United Kingdom) Nick Tandy**	did not participate	did not participate	**(United Kingdom) Jonny Edgar** **(Belgium) Laurens Vanthoor**	Report
4	Laguna Seca	**(Germany) #6 Porsche Penske Motorsport**	did not participate	**(United States) #77 AO Racing**	(United States) #57 Winward Racing	Report
4	Laguna Seca	**(Australia) Matt Campbell** **(France) Mathieu Jaminet**	did not participate	**(Austria) Klaus Bachler** **(Germany) Laurin Heinrich**	(Switzerland) Philip Ellis (United States) Russell Ward	Report
5	Detroit	**(United States) #93 Acura Meyer Shank Racing w/ Curb-Agajanian**	did not participate	**(Canada) #64 Ford Multimatic Motorsports**	did not participate	Report
5	Detroit	**(United Kingdom) Nick Yelloly** **(Netherlands) Renger van der Zande**	did not participate	**(United Kingdom) Sebastian Priaulx** **(Germany) Mike Rockenfeller**	did not participate	Report
6	Watkins Glen	**(United States) #60 Acura Meyer Shank Racing w/ Curb-Agajanian**	(United States) #22 United Autosports USA	**(United States) #48 Paul Miller Racing**	(United States) #27 Heart of Racing Team	Report
6	Watkins Glen	**(United Kingdom) Tom Blomqvist** **(United States) Colin Braun**	(United Kingdom) Paul di Resta (United States) Dan Goldburg (Sweden) Rasmus Lindh	**(United Kingdom) Dan Harper** **(Germany) Max Hesse**	(United Kingdom) Tom Gamble (Canada) Zacharie Robichon (United Kingdom) Casper Stevenson	Report
7	Mosport	did not participate	**(United States) #99 AO Racing**	**(United States) #81 DragonSpeed**	(United States) #45 Wayne Taylor Racing	Report
7	Mosport	did not participate	**(United States) Dane Cameron** **(United States) P. J. Hyett**	**(Spain) Albert Costa** **(Italy) Giacomo Altoè**	(Costa Rica) Danny Formal (United States) Trent Hindman	Report
8	Road America	**(United States) #24 BMW M Team RLL**	(United States) #99 AO Racing	**(United States) #1 Paul Miller Racing**	(United States) #021 Triarsi Competizione	Report
8	Road America	**(Austria) Philipp Eng** **(Belgium) Dries Vanthoor**	(United States) Dane Cameron (United States) P. J. Hyett	**(United States) Madison Snow** **(United States) Neil Verhagen**	(United States) Kenton Koch (United States) Onofrio Triarsi	Report
9	Virginia	did not participate	did not participate	**(United States) #3 Corvette Racing by Pratt Miller Motorsports**	(United States) #57 Winward Racing	Report
9	Virginia	did not participate	did not participate	**(Spain) Antonio García** **(United Kingdom) Alexander Sims**	(Switzerland) Philip Ellis (United States) Russell Ward	Report
10	Indianapolis	**(United States) #31 Cadillac Whelen**	(France) #11 TDS Racing	**(Canada) #64 Ford Multimatic Motorsports**	(United Kingdom) #70 Inception Racing	Report
10	Indianapolis	**(United Kingdom) Jack Aitken** **(New Zealand) Earl Bamber** **(Denmark) Frederik Vesti**	(Denmark) Mikkel Jensen (New Zealand) Hunter McElrea (United States) Steven Thomas	**(United Kingdom) Sebastian Priaulx** **(Germany) Mike Rockenfeller**	(United States) Brendan Iribe (United Kingdom) Ollie Millroy (Denmark) Frederik Schandorff	Report
11	Road Atlanta	**(United States) #31 Cadillac Whelen**	(France) #11 TDS Racing	**(United States) #48 Paul Miller Racing**	(Italy) #21 AF Corse	Report
11	Road Atlanta	**(United Kingdom) Jack Aitken** **(New Zealand) Earl Bamber** **(Denmark) Frederik Vesti**	(Denmark) Mikkel Jensen (New Zealand) Hunter McElrea (United States) Steven Thomas	**(United States) Connor De Phillippi** **(United Kingdom) Dan Harper** **(Germany) Max Hesse**	(United States) Simon Mann (Italy) Alessandro Pier Guidi (France) Lilou Wadoux	Report

== Championship standings ==
=== Points systems ===
Championship points are awarded in each class at the finish of each event. Points are awarded based on finishing positions in qualifying and the race as shown in the chart below.

Position	1	2	3	4	5	6	7	8	9	10	11	12	13	14	15	16	17	18	19	20	21	22	23	24	25	26	27	28	29	30+
Qualifying	35	32	30	28	26	25	24	23	22	21	20	19	18	17	16	15	14	13	12	11	10	9	8	7	6	5	4	3	2	1
Race	350	320	300	280	260	250	240	230	220	210	200	190	180	170	160	150	140	130	120	110	100	90	80	70	60	50	40	30	20	10

Drivers points

Points are awarded in each class at the finish of each event.

Team points

Team points are calculated in exactly the same way as driver points, using the point distribution chart. Each car entered is considered its own "team" regardless if it is a single entry or part of a two-car team.

Manufacturer points

There are also a number of manufacturer championships which utilize the same season-long point distribution chart. The manufacturer championships recognized by IMSA are as follows:

Grand Touring Prototype (GTP): Engine & bodywork manufacturer
GT Daytona Pro (GTD Pro): Car manufacturer
GT Daytona (GTD): Car manufacturer

Each manufacturer receives finishing points for its highest finishing car in each class. The positions of subsequent finishing cars from the same manufacturer are not taken into consideration, and all other manufacturers move up in the order.

Example: Manufacturer A finishes 1st and 2nd at an event, and Manufacturer B finishes 3rd. Manufacturer A receives 35 first-place points while Manufacturer B would earn 32 second-place points.

Michelin Endurance Cup

The points system for the Michelin Endurance Cup is different from the normal points system. Points are awarded on a 5–4–3–2 basis for drivers, teams and manufacturers. The first finishing position at each interval earns five points, four points for second position, three points for third, with two points awarded for fourth and each subsequent finishing position.

Position	1	2	3	Other Classified
Race	5	4	3	2

At the Rolex 24 at Daytona, points are awarded at 6 hours, 12 hours, 18 hours and at the finish. At the Sebring 12 hours, points are awarded at 4 hours, 8 hours and at the finish. At the Watkins Glen 6 hours and Indianapolis 6 hours, points are awarded at 3 hours and at the finish. At the Petit Le Mans (10 hours), points are awarded at 4 hours, 8 hours and at the finish.

Like the season-long team championship, Michelin Endurance Cup team points are awarded for each car and drivers get points in any car that they drive, in which they are entered for points. The manufacturer points go to the highest placed car from that manufacturer (the others from that manufacturer not being counted), just like the season-long manufacturer championship.

For example: in any particular segment manufacturer A finishes 1st and 2nd and manufacturer B finishes 3rd. Manufacturer A only receives first-place points for that segment. Manufacturer B receives the second-place points.

=== Drivers' Championships ===
==== Standings: Grand Touring Prototype (GTP) ====
Pos.	Drivers	DAY	SEB	LBH	LGA	DET	WGL	ELK	IMS	ATL	Points	MEC
1	(Australia) Matt Campbell (France) Mathieu Jaminet	3	2	2	1	3	4	5	7	3	2907	44
2	(United Kingdom) Jack Aitken	9	4	4	6	10	5	4	**1**	1	2720	45
3	(Brazil) Felipe Nasr (United Kingdom) Nick Tandy	1	1	1	2	4	11	11	12	10	2689	46
4	(Austria) Philipp Eng (Belgium) Dries Vanthoor	**4**	**12**	**3**	**3**	5	8	1	4	9	2679	30
5	(United Kingdom) Nick Yelloly (Netherlands) Renger van der Zande	8	3	11	5	**1**	**6**	**3**	5	7	2657	33
6	(Portugal) Filipe Albuquerque (United States) Ricky Taylor	5	7	6	8	2	3	8	2	6	2626	33
7	(United Kingdom) Tom Blomqvist (United States) Colin Braun	2	10	9	11	6	1	7	3	**5**	2602	44
8	(South Africa) Sheldon van der Linde (Germany) Marco Wittmann	7	5	5	4	7	12	2	6	11	2469	28
9	(New Zealand) Earl Bamber	9	4	4		10	5	4	**1**	1	2448	45
10	(Switzerland) Louis Delétraz (United States) Jordan Taylor	11	11	7	7	9	2	9	9	8	2304	31
11	(Netherlands) Tijmen van der Helm	6	8	10	9	11	10	10	8	12	2139	28
12	(Canada) Roman De Angelis (United Kingdom) Ross Gunn		9	8	10	8	9	6	11	2	2049	22
13	(Denmark) Frederik Vesti	9	4		6		5		**1**	1	1877	45
14	(Italy) Gianmaria Bruni	6	8	10	9	11	10	10			1680	18
15	(France) Romain Grosjean	12	13				7		10	4	1209	28
16	(Belgium) Laurens Vanthoor	1	1							10	998	38
17	(Italy) Daniil Kvyat	12	13				7			4	976	24
18	(Switzerland) Neel Jani	10	6				13			12	914	24
19	(New Zealand) Scott Dixon	2	10							**5**	882	31
20	(Japan) Kakunoshin Ohta	8					**6**		5		833	19
21	(United Kingdom) Will Stevens	5	7							6	820	20
22	(Denmark) Kevin Magnussen	**4**	**12**							9	782	22
23	(France) Tristan Vautier	10	6							7	776	20
24	(Netherlands) Robin Frijns	7	5							11	761	20
25	(Switzerland) Edoardo Mortara	12							10	4	749	18
26	(Chile) Nico Pino	10	6				13				705	18
27	(France) Kévin Estre	3	2								669	21
28	(Spain) Álex Palou	8	3								587	16
29	(Spain) Alex Riberas	9								2	585	14
30	(New Zealand) Brendon Hartley	5	11								508	14
31	(Switzerland) Nico Müller	8							8		502	10
32	(Italy) Mirko Bortolotti	12	13								412	14
33	(Sweden) Felix Rosenqvist	2									345	14
34	(Switzerland) Raffaele Marciello	**4**									315	9
35	(United States) Bryce Aron (Germany) Pascal Wehrlein	6									276	8
36	(Germany) René Rast	7									259	8
37	(France) Julien Andlauer	10								WD	255	8
38	(France) Norman Nato									8	250	6
39	(Brazil) Felipe Drugovich	9									248	8
40	(Japan) Kamui Kobayashi	11									223	9
41	(United States) Max Esterson									12	209	6
42	(Argentina) Nico Varrone						13				199	4
Pos.	Drivers	DAY	SEB	LBH	LGA	DET	WGL	ELK	IMS	ATL	Points	MEC

Colour	Result
Gold	Winner
Silver	Second place
Bronze	Third place
Green	Points classification
Blue	Non-points classification
Blue	Non-classified finish (NC)
Purple	Retired, not classified (Ret)
Red	Did not qualify (DNQ)
Red	Did not pre-qualify (DNPQ)
Black	Disqualified (DSQ)
White	Did not start (DNS)
White	Withdrew (WD)
White	Race cancelled (C)
Blank	Did not practice (DNP)
Blank	Did not arrive (DNA)
Blank	Excluded (EX)

**Bold** - Pole position
Italics - Fastest lap

==== Standings: Le Mans Prototype 2 (LMP2) ====
Pos.	Drivers	DAY	SEB	WGL	MOS	ELK	IMS	ATL	Points	MEC
1	(United States) Dane Cameron (United States) P. J. Hyett	5	7	**2**	**1**	1	5	6	2254	37
2	(United States) Steven Thomas	8	**3**	11	8	3	1	1	2154	46
3	(United States) Dan Goldburg	**1**	8	1	2	14	4	11	2117	40
4	(Brazil) Felipe Fraga (United States) Gar Robinson	2	4	5	3	11	3	8	2047	34
5	(United States) Jeremy Clarke		1	8	10	2	2	**2**	1908	36
6	(United Kingdom) Ben Hanley	11	5	10	4	4	**6**	9	1899	30
7	(Denmark) Mikkel Jensen	8	**3**	11		3	1	1	1894	46
8	(United States) George Kurtz	6	6	3	11	6	10	10	1836	35
9	(New Zealand) Hunter McElrea	8	**3**	11	8		1	1	1828	46
10	(Denmark) Benjamin Pedersen	3	9	12	5	13	8	4	1826	32
11	(France) Tom Dillmann	10	1	8	10		2	**2**	1798	46
12	(United Kingdom) Paul di Resta	**1**	8	1		14	4	11	1765	40
13	(Canada) John Farano	12	2	9	9	7	7	12	1757	34
14	(Canada) Chris Cumming (Brazil) Pietro Fittipaldi	9	11	7	6	8	9	7	1756	28
15	(Canada) Tobias Lütke	4	12	4		5	12	3	1647	30
16	(United States) Nick Boulle	11	5	10	5		**6**	9	1574	30
17	(Sweden) Rasmus Lindh	**1**	8	1			4	11	1565	40
18	(United States) Bijoy Garg	10	1	8			2	**2**	1560	46
19	(France) Sébastien Bourdais	12	2	9		7	7	12	1517	34
20	(Australia) Josh Burdon	2	4	**5**			3	8	1505	34
21	(Argentina) Luis Pérez Companc	7	10	6		12	11	5	1493	28
22	(United Kingdom) Jonny Edgar	5	7	2			5	6	1484	37
23	(Denmark) Malthe Jakobsen	6	6	3		6	10		1380	29
24	(Denmark) David Heinemeier Hansson	4	12	4			12	3	1362	30
25	(United Kingdom) Toby Sowery	6	6	3			10	10	1328	35
26	(Mexico) Sebastián Álvarez	12	2	9			7	12	1259	34
27	(Argentina) Matías Pérez Companc		10	6		12	11	5	1229	20
28	(United States) Juan Manuel Correa		5	10			**6**	9	1061	22
29	(Denmark) Nicklas Nielsen	7	10				11	5	1007	24
30	(Republic of Ireland) James Roe	9	11				9	7	970	24
31	(Switzerland) Mathias Beche (United States) Rodrigo Sales	3	9	12					786	22
32	(United Kingdom) Oliver Jarvis	11					12	3	770	20
33	(United States) Naveen Rao					13	8	4	757	10
34	(Canada) Phil Fayer				4	4			608	0
35	(France) Paul-Loup Chatin	4		4					606	12
36	(United Kingdom) Ryan Dalziel	4			7				561	8
37	(United States) Logan Sargeant						8	4	555	10
38	(France) Matthieu Vaxivière	7		6					537	12
39	(Japan) Kakunoshin Ohta		12			5			501	6
40	(United Kingdom) Alex Quinn				11			10	456	6
41	(Australia) James Allen	**1**							385	14
42	(United Kingdom) Tom Blomqvist				2				352	0
43	(Brazil) Felipe Massa	2							343	12
44	(United States) Connor De Phillippi					2			341	0
45	(United States) Ben Keating	3							332	12
46	(Denmark) Christian Rasmussen	5							285	12
47	(United States) Colton Herta	6							272	10
48	(United States) Dylan Murry	7							264	8
49	(Portugal) Manuel Espírito Santo			7					262	4
50	(Canada) Travis Hill				7				261	0
51	(France) Charles Milesi	8							256	8
52	(Australia) Scott Andrews (United States) Gerry Kraut				WD	9			256	0
53	(United Kingdom) Callum Ilott	9							248	8
54	(Netherlands) Renger van der Zande				9				240	0
55	(Australia) Matt Brabham (Estonia) Tõnis Kasemets					10			238	0
56	(Portugal) António Félix da Costa (United States) Jon Field	10							231	10
57	(Australia) Garnet Patterson	11							230	8
58	(Netherlands) Job van Uitert	12							209	10
Pos.	Drivers	DAY	SEB	WGL	MOS	ELK	IMS	ATL	Points	MEC

==== Standings: GT Daytona Pro (GTD Pro) ====
Pos.	Drivers	DAY	SEB	LGA	DET	WGL	MOS	ELK	VIR	IMS	ATL	Points	MEC
1	(Spain) Antonio García (United Kingdom) Alexander Sims	2	7	3	2	2	4	4	1	4	3	3265	34
2	(Spain) Albert Costa	6	**4**	**2**	8	3	1	**3**	**2**	2	7	3192	32
3	(United Kingdom) Sebastian Priaulx (Germany) Mike Rockenfeller	**3**	5	9	**1**	6	10	2	4	1	4	3077	32
4	(United Kingdom) Dan Harper (Germany) Max Hesse	12	2	5	7	1	9	7	10	**3**	**1**	2984	52
5	(Austria) Klaus Bachler (Germany) Laurin Heinrich	8	1	1	5	5	3	8	5	7	8	2963	37
6	(Netherlands) Nicky Catsburg (United States) Tommy Milner	7	9	6	6	4	2	10	3	6	2	2908	34
7	(United States) Madison Snow (United States) Neil Verhagen	4	3	10	11	7	**6**	1	6	8	9	2794	47
8	(Germany) Christopher Mies (Belgium) Frédéric Vervisch	1	6	8	10	10	7	5	7	10	5	2714	35
9	(Italy) Andrea Caldarelli	13	10	4	3	**9**	5	6	9	9	10	2580	28
10	(United States) Aaron Telitz	11	11	7	4	8	8	9	8	5	6	2577	33
11	(Italy) Marco Mapelli	13	10	4	3		5	6	9	9	10	2325	24
12	(Italy) Giacomo Altoè		**4**	**2**			1	**3**	**2**		7	1999	13
13	(United Kingdom) Ben Barnicoat	11				8	8	9	8	5	6	1790	27
14	(Italy) Davide Rigon	6	**4**			3				2	7	1525	32
15	(United States) Connor De Phillippi	4	3			7				8	9	1389	47
16	(Spain) Daniel Juncadella	2	7								3	937	24
17	(Norway) Dennis Olsen	1	6								5	935	25
18	(Argentina) Nico Varrone	7	9								2	860	26
19	(United States) Kyle Kirkwood	11	11								6	722	24
20	(Canada) James Hinchcliffe	13	10								10	649	20
21	(Belgium) Alessio Picariello	8	1									636	22
22	(United Kingdom) Ben Barker		5								4	586	12
23	(Finland) Jesse Krohn	12	2									568	23
24	(Italy) Matteo Cressoni (Austria) Richard Lietz (Italy) Claudio Schiavoni	10	8									477	14
25	(Canada) Mikaël Grenier (Australia) Kenny Habul	15								11		402	12
26	(United States) Austin Cindric	**3**										335	9
27	(United Kingdom) Jack Hawksworth				4							300	0
28	(South Africa) Kelvin van der Linde	4										298	15
29	(United States) Anthony Bartone (Belgium) Maxime Martin (Germany) Fabian Schiller (Germany) Luca Stolz	5										280	8
30	(Spain) Miguel Molina (France) Thomas Neubauer	6										269	8
31	(Germany) Marvin Kirchhöfer			7								263	0
32	(Denmark) Michael Christensen										8	256	6
33	(United Kingdom) Sandy Mitchell					**9**						255	4
34	(Sweden) Rasmus Lindh				8							251	0
35	(New Zealand) Shane van Gisbergen (United States) Ben Keating (New Zealand) Scott McLaughlin (United States) Connor Zilisch	9										243	8
36	(United States) Frankie Montecalvo (Canada) Parker Thompson				9							242	0
37	(Austria) Thomas Preining	10										227	8
38	(Argentina) José María López		11									224	6
39	(Brazil) Augusto Farfus	12										220	11
40	(Australia) Broc Feeney									11		220	4
41	(United States) Townsend Bell	11										216	8
42	(South Africa) Jordan Pepper	13										206	8
43	(Canada) Roman De Angelis (United Kingdom) Ross Gunn (Spain) Alex Riberas (Denmark) Marco Sørensen	14										191	8
44	(Germany) Maro Engel (Andorra) Jules Gounon	15										182	8
Pos.	Drivers	DAY	SEB	LGA	DET	WGL	MOS	ELK	VIR	IMS	ATL	Points	MEC

==== Standings: GT Daytona (GTD) ====
Pos.	Drivers	DAY	SEB	LBH	LGA	WGL	MOS	ELK	VIR	IMS	ATL	Points	MEC
1	(Switzerland) Philip Ellis (United States) Russell Ward	4	1	4	1	16	2	**10**	1	5	5	3103	31
2	(United States) Kenton Koch	9	18	6	**4**	3	7	1	2	7	2	2908	37
3	(United Kingdom) Casper Stevenson	3	3	9	12	**1**	5	9	3	**11**	4	2898	38
4	(United Kingdom) Jack Hawksworth (Canada) Parker Thompson	14	2	**2**	2	11	**3**	11	**9**	9	3	2851	37
5	(United States) Robby Foley (United States) Patrick Gallagher	5	6	5	9	8	8	4	4	4	8	2739	29
6	(United States) Adam Adelson (United States) Elliott Skeer	**2**	5	7	6	13	10	6	7	2	6	2727	36
7	(United States) Manny Franco (Brazil) Daniel Serra	11	7	16	3	10	11	3	6	3	16	2534	31
8	(United States) Onofrio Triarsi	15	20		7	4	7	1	2	7	2	2472	35
9	(United Kingdom) Matt Bell (Canada) Orey Fidani	1	10	13	13	9	9	7	8	6	9	2461	34
10	(United States) Brendan Iribe (Denmark) Frederik Schandorff	18	4	8	15	2	6	13	11	1	18	2405	40
11	(United Kingdom) Tom Gamble	3	3	9		**1**		9	3	**11**	4	2404	38
12	(Costa Rica) Danny Formal (United States) Trent Hindman	10	14	11	8	20	1	5	13	14	12	2274	28
13	(Germany) Mario Farnbacher (Canada) Misha Goikhberg	12	12	12	5	14	13	2	12	13	13	2266	29
14	(United States) Alec Udell	19	8		10	15	4	8	10	17	7	2035	28
15	(United States) Frankie Montecalvo	14	2	3		11				9	3	1660	37
16	(Canada) Zacharie Robichon	3	3			**1**				**11**	4	1574	38
17	(Netherlands) Indy Dontje	4	1			16				5	5	1442	31
18	(Australia) Tom Sargent	**2**	5			13				2	6	1432	36
19	(United States) Jake Walker	5	6			8				4	8	1349	29
20	(Germany) Lars Kern	1	10			9				6	9	1320	34
21	(United States) Robert Megennis			10	14		12	12	5		14	1318	6
22	(United Kingdom) Ollie Millroy	18	4			2				1	18	1285	40
23	(Canada) Robert Wickens			15	10		4	8	10			1226	0
24	(United States) Simon Mann (Italy) Alessandro Pier Guidi (France) Lilou Wadoux	16	**16**			5				18	1	1163	46
25	(United States) Jenson Altzman			10	14		12	12	5			1116	0
26	(United Kingdom) James Calado	22				4				7	2	1021	31
27	(United Kingdom) Till Bechtolsheimer (United States) Joey Hand	17	13			6				10	17	995	28
28	(Italy) Lorenzo Patrese	20	19			7				12	**10**	993	28
29	(Republic of Ireland) Charlie Eastwood (Turkey) Salih Yoluç	19	8			15				17	7	992	28
30	(France) Valentin Hasse-Clot (United States) Anthony McIntosh	6	17			18				15	11	991	28
31	(United States) Seth Lucas	9	18	6	**4**							978	15
32	(United States) Graham Doyle	10	14			20				14	12	939	28
33	(Australia) Scott Andrews	13	9			19				16	15	925	30
34	(United States) Eric Filgueiras	13	9							13	13	826	27
35	(United States) Rory van der Steur	6	17			18					11	809	24
36	(Italy) Antonio Fuoco	20	19			7				12		748	22
37	(Italy) Riccardo Agostini	7			7						14	723	14
38	(United Kingdom) Stevan McAleer (United States) Sheena Monk	22	15	14	11							697	16
39	(United States) AJ Muss					12				8	14	659	14
40	(Colombia) Tatiana Calderón	17	13			6						613	18
41	(United States) Dan Knox	13	9			19						562	20
42	(Canada) Daniel Morad	9				3						560	14
43	(United Kingdom) Ben Tuck					10				3		554	11
44	(United States) Wyatt Brichacek					19				16	15	495	14
45	(Monaco) Cédric Sbirrazzuoli	11	7									484	14
46	(Belgium) Sarah Bovy (Switzerland) Rahel Frey (Denmark) Michelle Gatting	8	11									471	14
47	(United States) Mike Skeen	22	15								16	464	22
48	(United States) Parker Kligerman	12	12									430	14
49	(Italy) Giorgio Sernagiotto		19			7						411	10
50	(United States) John Potter (United States) Spencer Pumpelly	21				17					19	411	18
51	(Germany) Maximilian Götz	9	18									392	15
52	(United Kingdom) Jonny Edgar (Belgium) Laurens Vanthoor			1								382	0
53	(United States) Mason Filippi									10	17	382	10
54	(Italy) Roberto Lacorte	20									**10**	367	14
55	(Germany) Marvin Kirchhöfer	1										365	14
56	(Netherlands) Lin Hodenius									16	15	363	10
57	(Turkey) Ayhancan Güven	**2**										355	13
58	(Italy) Nicola Lacorte	20								12		337	12
59	(South Africa) Mikey Taylor					3						330	5
60	(United States) Aaron Telitz			3								325	0
61	(Italy) Mattia Drudi	3										324	9
62	(Austria) Lucas Auer	4										312	8
63	(New Zealand) Andrew Waite					4						304	4
64	(Italy) Alessio Rovera (United States) Charlie Scardina	15	20									298	14
65	(Canada) Roman De Angelis						5					288	0
66	(Germany) Jens Klingmann	5										278	9
67	(France) Maxime Robin	6										275	8
68	(Denmark) Conrad Laursen (Monaco) Arthur Leclerc (Brazil) Custodio Toledo	7										251	8
69	(Switzerland) Karen Gaillard	8										251	8
70	(United States) Joel Miller (Italy) Niccolò Schirò									8		250	4
71	(Spain) Miguel Molina										**10**	245	6
72	(Canada) Kyle Marcelli	10										240	8
73	(Italy) Giacomo Altoè	11										222	8
74	(France) Franck Perera	12										216	8
75	(Italy) Alessandro Balzan (United States) Jason Hart					12						207	4
76	(United Kingdom) Darren Turner				12							206	0
77	(United States) Kyle Kirkwood	14										198	8
78	(Canada) Scott Hargrove					14						193	4
79	(Estonia) Ralf Aron	13										193	10
80	(United States) Tommy Milner			15								183	0
81	(Brazil) Eduardo Barrichello									15		182	4
82	(Italy) Eddie Cheever III	15										169	8
83	(Japan) Kei Cozzolino	16										167	8
84	(Denmark) Marco Sørensen					17						159	4
85	(United Kingdom) Harry Tincknell	17										154	8
86	(Italy) David Fumanelli	18										153	14
87	(Brazil) Pipo Derani	19										136	8
88	(Belgium) Jan Heylen										19	133	6
89	(United States) Andy Lally (Denmark) Nicki Thiim	21										119	8
Pos.	Drivers	DAY	SEB	LBH	LGA	WGL	MOS	ELK	VIR	IMS	ATL	Points	MEC

=== Teams' Championships ===
==== Standings: Grand Touring Prototype (GTP) ====
Pos.	Team	Car	DAY	SEB	LBH	LGA	DET	WGL	ELK	IMS	ATL	Points	MEC
1	#6 Porsche Penske Motorsport	Porsche 963	3	2	2	1	3	4	5	7	3	2907	44
2	#31 Cadillac Whelen	Cadillac V-Series.R	9	4	4	6	10	5	4	**1**	1	2720	45
3	#7 Porsche Penske Motorsport	Porsche 963	1	1	1	2	4	11	11	12	10	2689	46
4	#24 BMW M Team RLL	BMW M Hybrid V8	**4**	**12**	**3**	**3**	5	8	1	4	9	2679	30
5	#93 Acura Meyer Shank Racing w/ Curb-Agajanian	Acura ARX-06	8	3	11	5	**1**	**6**	**3**	5	7	2657	33
6	#10 Cadillac Wayne Taylor Racing	Cadillac V-Series.R	5	7	6	8	2	3	8	2	6	2626	33
7	#60 Acura Meyer Shank Racing w/ Curb-Agajanian	Acura ARX-06	2	10	9	11	6	1	7	3	**5**	2602	44
8	#25 BMW M Team RLL	BMW M Hybrid V8	7	5	5	4	7	12	2	6	11	2469	28
9	#40 Cadillac Wayne Taylor Racing	Cadillac V-Series.R	11	11	7	7	9	2	9	9	8	2304	31
10	#85 JDC–Miller MotorSports	Porsche 963	6	8	10	9	11	10	10	8	12	2139	28
11	#23 Aston Martin THOR Team	Aston Martin Valkyrie		9	8	10	8	9	6	11	2	2049	22
12	#63 Automobili Lamborghini Squadra Corse	Lamborghini SC63	12	13				7		10	4	1209	28
13	#5 Proton Competition	Porsche 963	10	6				13				705	18
Pos.	Team	Car	DAY	SEB	LBH	LGA	DET	WGL	ELK	IMS	ATL	Points	MEC

==== Standings: Le Mans Prototype 2 (LMP2) ====
Pos.	Team	Car	DAY	SEB	WGL	MOS	ELK	IMS	ATL	Points	MEC
1	#99 AO Racing	Oreca 07	5	7	**2**	**1**	**1**	5	6	2254	37
2	#11 TDS Racing	Oreca 07	8	**3**	11	8	3	1	1	2154	46
3	#43 Inter Europol Competition	Oreca 07	10	1	8	10	2	2	**2**	2139	46
4	#22 United Autosports USA	Oreca 07	**1**	8	1	2	14	4	11	2117	40
5	#74 Riley	Oreca 07	2	4	5	3	11	3	8	2047	34
6	#18 Era Motorsport	Oreca 07	4	12	4	7	5	12	3	1908	30
7	#2 United Autosports USA	Oreca 07	11	5	10	4	4	**6**	9	1899	30
8	#04 CrowdStrike Racing by APR	Oreca 07	6	6	3	11	6	10	10	1836	35
9	#52 PR1/Mathiasen Motorsports	Oreca 07	3	9	12	5	13	8	4	1826	32
10	#8 Tower Motorsports	Oreca 07	12	2	9	9	7	7	12	1757	34
11	#73 Pratt Miller Motorsports	Oreca 07	9	11	7	6	8	9	7	1756	28
12	#88 AF Corse	Oreca 07	7	10	6		12	11	5	1493	28
13	#79 JDC–Miller MotorSports	Oreca 07				DNS	9			256	0
14	#61 Team Tonis	Oreca 07					10			238	0
Pos.	Team	Car	DAY	SEB	WGL	MOS	ELK	IMS	ATL	Points	MEC

==== Standings: GT Daytona Pro (GTD Pro) ====
Pos.	Team	Car	DAY	SEB	LGA	DET	WGL	MOS	ELK	VIR	IMS	ATL	Points	MEC
1	#3 Corvette Racing by Pratt Miller Motorsports	Chevrolet Corvette Z06 GT3.R	2	7	3	2	2	4	4	1	4	3	3265	34
2	#81 DragonSpeed	Ferrari 296 GT3	6	**4**	**2**	8	3	1	**3**	**2**	2	7	3192	32
3	#64 Ford Multimatic Motorsports	Ford Mustang GT3	**3**	5	9	**1**	6	10	2	4	1	4	3077	32
4	#48 Paul Miller Racing	BMW M4 GT3 Evo	12	2	5	7	1	9	7	10	**3**	**1**	2984	52
5	#77 AO Racing	Porsche 911 GT3 R (992)	8	1	1	5	5	3	8	5	7	8	2963	37
6	#4 Corvette Racing by Pratt Miller Motorsports	Chevrolet Corvette Z06 GT3.R	7	9	6	6	4	2	10	3	6	2	2908	34
7	#1 Paul Miller Racing	BMW M4 GT3 Evo	4	3	10	11	7	**6**	1	6	8	9	2794	47
8	#65 Ford Multimatic Motorsports	Ford Mustang GT3	1	6	8	10	11	7	5	7	10	5	2714	35
9	#9 Pfaff Motorsports	Lamborghini Huracán GT3 Evo 2	13	10	4	3	**9**	5	6	9	9	10	2580	28
10	#14 Vasser Sullivan Racing	Lexus RC F GT3	11	11	7	4	8	8	9	8	5	6	2577	33
11	#20 Proton Competition	Porsche 911 GT3 R (992)	10	8									477	14
12	#75 75 Express	Mercedes-AMG GT3 Evo	15								11		402	12
13	#69 GetSpeed Performance	Mercedes-AMG GT3 Evo	5										280	8
14	#91 Trackhouse by TF Sport	Chevrolet Corvette Z06 GT3.R	9										243	8
15	#15 Vasser Sullivan Racing	Lexus RC F GT3				9							242	0
16	#007 Heart of Racing Team	Aston Martin Vantage AMR GT3 Evo	14										191	8
Pos.	Team	Car	DAY	SEB	LGA	DET	WGL	MOS	ELK	VIR	IMS	ATL	Points	MEC

==== Standings: GT Daytona (GTD) ====
Pos.	Team	Car	DAY	SEB	LBH	LGA	WGL	MOS	ELK	VIR	IMS	ATL	Points	MEC
1	#57 Winward Racing	Mercedes-AMG GT3 Evo	4	1	4	1	16	2	**10**	1	5	5	3103	31
2	#27 Heart of Racing Team	Aston Martin Vantage AMR GT3 Evo	3	3	9	12	**1**	5	9	3	**11**	4	2898	38
3	#12 Vasser Sullivan Racing	Lexus RC F GT3	14	2	**2**	2	11	**3**	11	**9**	9	3	2851	37
4	#96 Turner Motorsport	BMW M4 GT3 Evo	5	6	5	9	8	8	4	4	4	8	2739	29
5	#120 Wright Motorsports	Porsche 911 GT3 R (992)	**2**	5	7	6	13	10	6	7	2	6	2727	36
6	#34 Conquest Racing	Ferrari 296 GT3	11	7	16	3	10	11	3	6	3	16	2534	31
7	#13 AWA	Chevrolet Corvette Z06 GT3.R	1	10	13	13	9	9	7	8	6	9	2461	34
8	#70 Inception Racing	Ferrari 296 GT3	18	4	8	15	2	6	13	11	1	18	2405	40
9	#021 Triarsi Competizione	Ferrari 296 GT3	22	15	14	11	12	7	1	2	8	14	2349	30
10	#45 Wayne Taylor Racing	Lamborghini Huracán GT3 Evo 2	10	14	11	8	20	1	5	13	14	12	2274	28
11	#78 Forte Racing	Lamborghini Huracán GT3 Evo 2	12	12	12	5	14	13	2	12	13	13	2266	29
12	#36 DXDT Racing	Chevrolet Corvette Z06 GT3.R	19	8	15	10	15	4	8	10	17	7	2218	28
13	#66 Gradient Racing	Ford Mustang GT3	17	13	10	14	6	12	12	5	10	17	2111	28
14	#023 Triarsi Competizione	Ferrari 296 GT3	15	20		7	4				7	2	1479	35
15	#32 Korthoff Competition Motors	Mercedes-AMG GT3 Evo	9	18	6	**4**	3						1308	20
16	#21 AF Corse	Ferrari 296 GT3	16	**16**			5				18	1	1163	46
17	#47 Cetilar Racing	Ferrari 296 GT3	20	19			7				12	**10**	993	28
18	#19 van der Steur Racing	Aston Martin Vantage AMR GT3 Evo	6	17			18				15	11	991	28
19	#80 Lone Star Racing	Mercedes-AMG GT3 Evo	13	9			19				16	15	925	30
20	#83 Iron Dames	Porsche 911 GT3 R (992)	8	11									471	14
21	#44 Magnus Racing	Aston Martin Vantage AMR GT3 Evo	21				19					19	411	18
22	#177 AO Racing	Porsche 911 GT3 R (992)			1								382	0
23	#89 Vasser Sullivan Racing	Lexus RC F GT3			3								325	0
24	#50 AF Corse	Ferrari 296 GT3	7										251	8
Pos.	Team	Car	DAY	SEB	LBH	LGA	WGL	MOS	ELK	VIR	IMS	ATL	Points	MEC

=== Manufacturers' Championships ===
==== Standings: Grand Touring Prototype (GTP) ====
Pos.	Manufacturer	DAY	SEB	LBH	LGA	DET	WGL	ELK	IMS	ATL	Points	MEC
1	(Germany) Porsche	1	1	1	1	3	4	5	7	3	3134	57
2	(Japan) Acura	2	3	9	5	1	**1**	**3**	3	**5**	3092	51
3	(United States) Cadillac	5	4	4	6	**2**	2	4	**1**	1	3069	52
4	(Germany) BMW	**4**	**5**	**3**	**3**	4	8	1	4	9	2947	34
5	(United Kingdom) Aston Martin		9	8	10	10	9	6	11	2	2348	22
6	(Italy) Lamborghini	12	13				7		10	4	1459	28
Pos.	Manufacturer	DAY	SEB	LBH	LGA	DET	WGL	ELK	IMS	ATL	Points	MEC

==== Standings: GT Daytona Pro (GTD Pro) ====
Pos.	Manufacturer	DAY	SEB	LGA	DET	WGL	MOS	ELK	VIR	IMS	ATL	Points	MEC
1	(United States) Chevrolet	2	7	3	2	2	2	4	1	4	2	3370	40
2	(Germany) BMW	4	2	5	7	1	**6**	1	6	**3**	**1**	3325	65
3	(United States) Ford	**1**	5	8	**1**	6	7	2	4	1	4	3283	40
4	(Italy) Ferrari	6	**4**	**2**	8	3	1	**3**	**2**	2	7	3262	34
5	(Germany) Porsche	8	1	1	5	5	3	8	5	7	8	3085	40
6	(Italy) Lamborghini	13	10	4	3	**9**	5	6	9	9	10	2807	28
7	(Japan) Lexus	11	11	7	4	8	8	9	8	5	6	2790	33
8	(Germany) Mercedes-AMG	5								11		558	12
9	(United Kingdom) Aston Martin	14										244	8
Pos.	Manufacturer	DAY	SEB	LGA	DET	WGL	MOS	ELK	VIR	IMS	ATL	Points	MEC

==== Standings: GT Daytona (GTD) ====
Pos.	Manufacturer	DAY	SEB	LBH	LGA	WGL	MOS	ELK	VIR	IMS	ATL	Points	MEC
1	(Germany) Mercedes-AMG	4	1	4	**1**	3	2	**10**	1	5	5	3363	36
2	(Italy) Ferrari	7	**4**	8	3	2	7	1	2	1	**1**	3324	61
3	(United Kingdom) Aston Martin	3	3	9	12	**1**	5	9	3	**11**	4	3066	39
4	(Japan) Lexus	14	2	**2**	2	11	**3**	11	**9**	9	3	3055	39
5	(Germany) Porsche	**2**	5	1	6	13	10	6	7	2	6	3013	37
6	(Germany) BMW	5	6	5	9	8	8	4	4	4	8	2910	32
7	(United States) Chevrolet	1	8	13	10	9	4	7	8	6	7	2856	34
8	(Italy) Lamborghini	10	12	11	5	14	1	2	12	13	12	2798	30
9	(United States) Ford	17	13	10	14	6	12	12	5	10	17	2565	28
Pos.	Manufacturer	DAY	SEB	LBH	LGA	WGL	MOS	ELK	VIR	IMS	ATL	Points	MEC

== See also ==
- 2025 FIA World Endurance Championship
- 2025 European Le Mans Series
