= Iribe Center =

Academic building in Maryland, United States

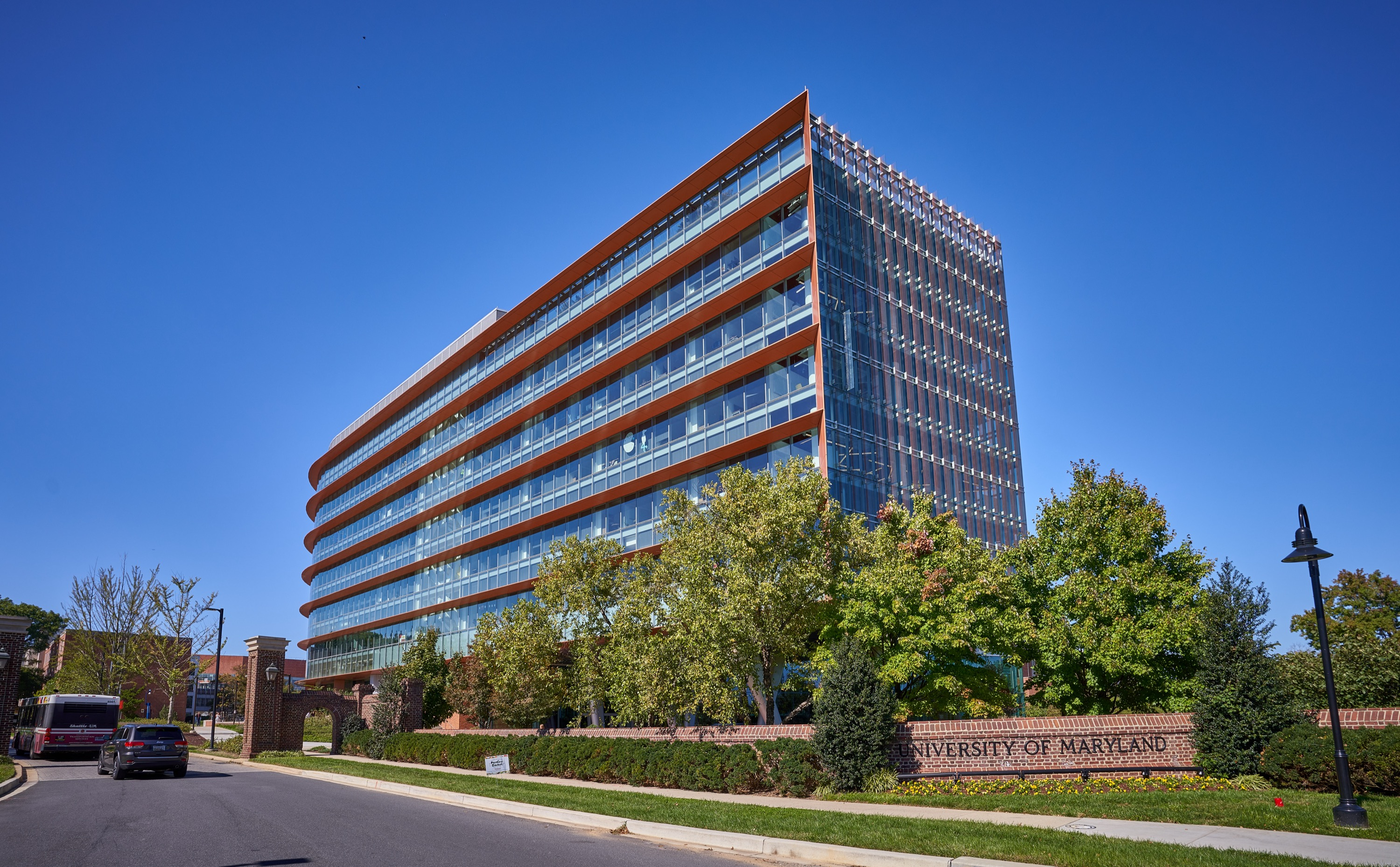
- Interactive map of the Iribe Center area

General information
- Location: University of Maryland, 8125 Paint Branch Drive, College Park, Maryland, United States
- Coordinates: 38°59′21″N 76°56′11″W
- Completed: 2019

Design and construction
- Architect: HDR

Website
- iribe.umd.edu

The Iribe Center (/ˈiːriːb/; officially known as the Brendan Iribe Center for Computer Science and Innovation) is a building at the University of Maryland, College Park that is used primarily for computer science education and research. It replaced the university's previous computer science buildings, the Computer Science Instruction Building and the A. V. Williams Building.

== Construction ==
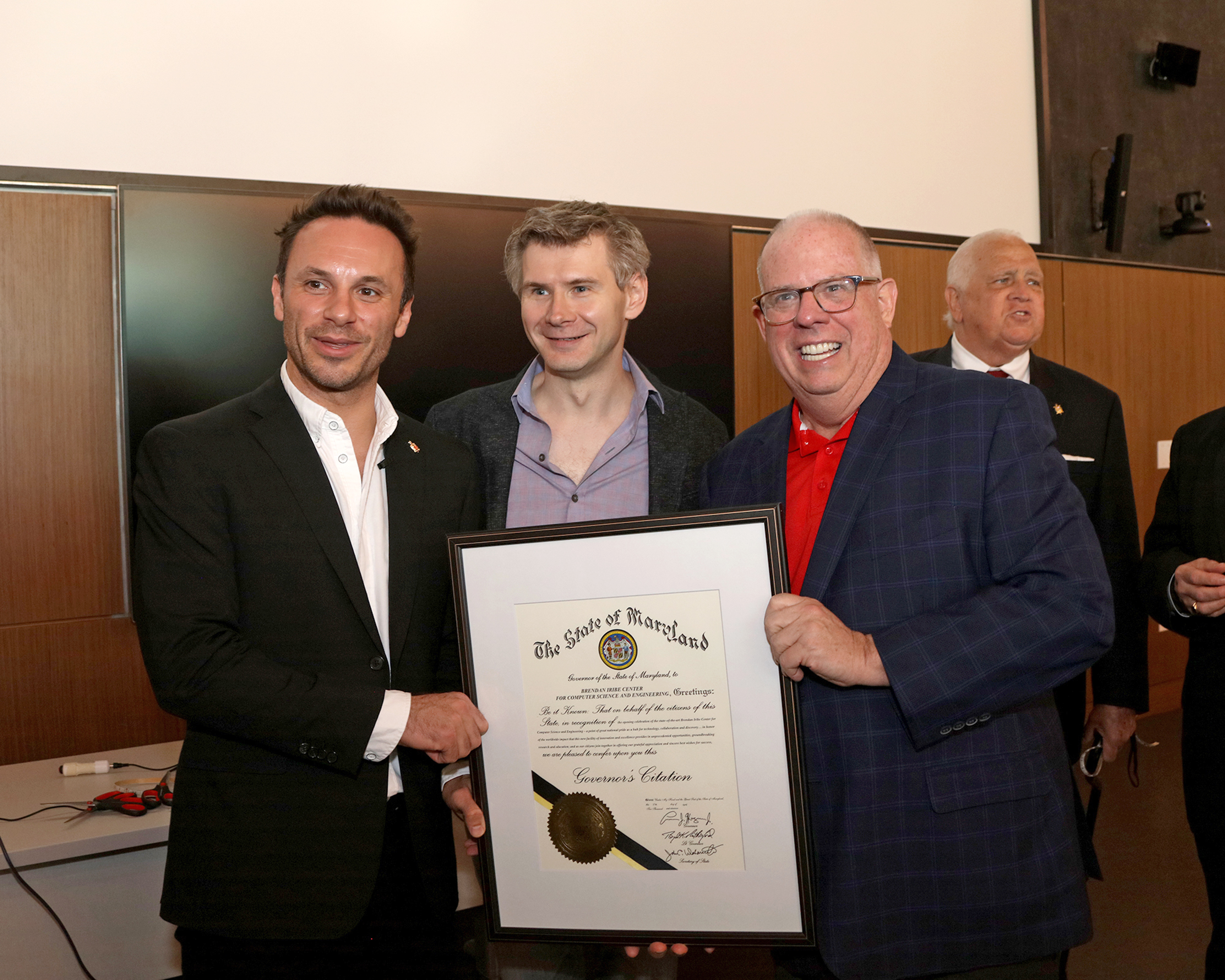
The opening ceremony at the Iribe Center with Brendan Iribe, Michael Antonov, and Larry Hogan

The construction of the center was completed in 2019 after several years of construction and at a reported cost of $152 million. It was named after Brendan Iribe, who donated money to pay for part of the construction cost. He is an entrepreneur and former student at the university who had previously dropped out. Part of the center's funding also came from the state government. The opening ceremony was held on April 26, 2019, a date chosen to coincide with the university's public outreach day, although parts of the facility were accessible to students before that time. Those in attendance to the opening ceremony included the state governor, Larry Hogan, and the president of the university, Wallace Loh. Loh stated that the building represents the fusion of the "traditional academy and the technological future and economic development of the state of Maryland".

== Design and usage ==
Designed by a team at the Omaha-based architecture firm HDR led by Brian Kowalchuk, the center consists of two general-purpose floors and several floors dedicated to computer science research, in addition to an auditorium with approximately 300 seats. The research area includes devices such as 3D printers, laser cutters, vinyl cutters, and metal milling machines, many of which cannot be found anywhere else on the university's campus.
