= Alexander Koreiba =

American racing driver (born 1997)

- Nationality: (United States) American
- Born: October 9, 1997 (age 29) Branson, Missouri, United States

HSR Prototype Challenge presented by IMSA career
- Debut season: 2024
- Former teams: Wolf Motorsports
- Starts: 5
- Wins: 3
- Podiums: 5
- Poles: 5
- Best finish: 1st in 2024

Previous series
- 2024 2023 2022 2021 2018 2018: HSR Prototype Challenge; IMSA SportsCar Championship; IMSA Prototype Challenge; F4 United States Championship; Lucas Oil Formula Car Race Series; Lucas Oil Winter Race Series

Championship titles
- 2024: HSR Prototype Challenge presented by IMSA - Pro-Am

Alexander Koreiba (born October 9, 1997) is an American racing driver. He currently competes in Indy NXT, driving for Juncos Hollinger Racing. He has previously competed in the HSR Prototype Challenge presented by IMSA driving in the Pro-Am class, where he won the championship.

== Early life ==
Koreiba grew up in Branson, Missouri, in a family that works in the entertainment industry.

Koreiba's love for racing came from time spent with his father, who owned a Corvette and would often take him for drives as a child, and from watching Top Gear USA. As a child, Koreiba was a fan of Tanner Foust, and wanted to be like him.

== Career ==
=== IMSA Prototype Challenge ===
==== 2022 ====
In 2022, Koreiba joined the 2022 IMSA Prototype Challenge to the No. 23 Duqueine M30 - D08 for JDC MotorSports. This was Koreiba’s first opportunity to race full-time with a specific team, as he had mostly done individual races or portions of specific series between 2017 and 2022.

Koreiba would be paired with former IndyCar driver Memo Gidley. In the opening round at Daytona, the pair qualified on pole position for the race. They would ultimately finish the race in third. The duo would qualify on pole again for the second race at Mid-Ohio. The race would be caution free and they would go on to win their first race of the season. The win moved the pair up to second in the championship behind Tõnis Kasemets. Koreiba and Gidley had a decent showing in the next race at Mid-Ohio, finishing fifth. However, rival Kasemets won the race and extended his lead in the championship. The fourth race of the season at Virginia International Raceway saw Koreiba and Gidley return to form, finishing second behind Kasemets. Going into the final round of the championship at Road Atlanta, the pair were still second in the championship behind Kasemets with the potential of winning the title if Kasemets had a bad result. Koreiba and Gidley ultimately finished second behind Kasemets, who won the championship.

=== IMSA SportsCar Championship ===
==== 2023 ====
Towards the end of the 2023 IMSA SportsCar Championship, Koreiba got the call up from Performance Tech Motorsports to compete in the 2023 IMSA Battle on the Bricks at the Indianapolis Motor Speedway. He would be paired with Connor Bloum as his teammate. The duo had a decent race finishing ninth in their class.

=== HSR Prototype Challenge ===
==== 2024 ====
In 2024, Koreiba joined the 2024 HSR Prototype Challenge presented by IMSA to drive the No. 25 Ligier JS P320 for Wolf Motorsports in the LMP3 Pro-Am class. Joining him would be amateur driver James French. Koreiba and French had a good start to the season, qualifying on pole in the first race at Sebring International Raceway. The pair led most of the race and were battling with the No. 37 One Motorsports car of Kenton Koch and Jon Field. The No. 37 team elected to do two of their three mandatory pitstops in close succession. Following the No. 25 Wolf Motorsports team's final pit stop with French behind the wheel, they came out just in front the No. 37 of Koch who had already completed their final pit stop. Koch began closing in on French, and eventually made the move for the lead on the penultimate lap of the race in turn 15. French kept close behind Koch, but ultimately wasn't able to challenge Koch for the win. Koreiba and French would finish second behind Koch and Field. During qualifying in the next race at Road Atlanta, Koreiba and French qualified on pole once again. Koreiba started the race and established a gap to the cars behind him. Later in the race, the No. 37 One Motorsports car of Koch and Field once again appeared to be challenging Koreiba and French. The No. 37 started last, but despite this, Field had made his way into the top-five just 20 minutes into the race and eventually got up to second at the 45-minute mark. However, the No. 37 unexpectedly ran out of fuel prior to their pit stop. This allowed Koreiba and French to go unchallenged in the remainder of the race and claim their maiden victory. The pair would qualify on pole for the third consecutive time in round three at Watkins Glen. Koreiba and French would not be challenged during the entire race, and dominated the field with an 28 second gap to second at the finish, securing their second win in a row. Returning to Road Atlanta for the second race at the track, the duo continued their qualifying form by getting another pole position for the race, their fourth in a row. However, they would not be able to win as penalties would set them back and leave them finishing second. Although, their consistent podium finishes and wins allowed Koreiba and French to extend their championship lead ahead of the No. 74 Hudson Historics team going into the final race of the season at Daytona. The pair once again qualified on pole for the race at Daytona, meaning they qualified on pole in all five races of the season. Koreiba would start the race and remained in the lead during the initial stage of the race. However, a shifting issue with his steering wheel meant he lost time and dropped behind a few cars in the field. Once the issue was resolved, Koreiba increased his pace and eventually overtook those cars to regain the lead of the race. Although they regained the lead, the pair were being pressured by championship rivals John Reisman and Eric Curran in the No. 74 Hudson Historics car. The No. 25 remained in the lead with French in the car, but the No. 74 of Curran was closing in on French in the closing minutes of the race. Ultimately, French was able to hold onto the lead, and crossed the finish line in first, awarding Koreiba and French their third win of the season, and the championship.

=== Indy NXT ===
In 2024, Koreiba partnered with Juncos Hollinger Racing to drive their Indy NXT car in the Chris Griffis Memorial Test held at the Indianapolis Motor Speedway. He finished 19th out of the 22 drivers in the test.

=== Coaching ===
In addition to racing, Koreiba also works as a professional driving coach. In 2024, he coached Cody Jones of Dude Perfect in preparation for the Toyota GR Cup at the Indianapolis Motor Speedway. The two spent six months working together ahead of the race.

Koreiba also coached actor Keanu Reeves to participate in the same race.

== Racing record ==
=== Racing career summary ===
Season	Series	Team	Races	Wins	Poles	F/Laps	Podiums	Points	Position
2018	Lucas Oil Winter Race Series	N/A	6	2	2	0	3	177	**3rd**
2018	Lucas Oil Formula Car Race Series	N/A	4	1	0	1	1	116	11th
2021	Formula 4 United States Championship	Jay Howard Driver Development	2	0	0	0	0	0	30th
2022	IMSA Prototype Challenge	JDC MotorSports	5	1	0	0	4	1550	**2nd**
2023	IMSA SportsCar Championship - LMP3	Performance Tech Motorsports	1	0	0	0	0	248	36th
2024	HSR Prototype Challenge presented by IMSA - Pro-Am	Wolf Motorsports	5	3	5	?	5	36	**1st**
2026	Indy NXT	Juncos Hollinger Racing	17	0	0	0	0	207	21st

* Season still in progress.

=== American open-wheel racing results ===
==== Complete Lucas Oil Winter Race Series results ====
(key) (Races in bold indicate pole position) (Races in italics indicate fastest lap)

Year	Entrant	1	2	3	4	5	6	Rank	Points
2018	N/A	PAL; 1; 6	PAL; 2; 7	SEB; 1; 8	SEB; 2; 3	**PAL**; **3**; 1	**PAL**; **4**; 1	3rd	177

==== Complete Lucas Oil Formula Car Race Series results ====
(key) (Races in bold indicate pole position) (Races in italics indicate fastest lap)

Year	Team	1	2	3	4	5	6	7	8	9	10	11	12	13	14	15	16	Pos	Points
2018	N/A	PAL; 1; 5	PAL; 2; 1	ACC; 1; 5	ACC; 2; 6	NOL; 1	NOL; 2	TSM; 1	TSM; 2	NCM; 1	NCM; 2	ROA; 1	ROA; 2	MOH; 1	MOH; 2	SEB; 1	SEB; 2	11th	116

==== Complete Formula 4 United States Championship results ====
(key) (Races in bold indicate pole position) (Races in italics indicate fastest lap)

Year	Team	1	2	3	4	5	6	7	8	9	10	11	12	13	14	15	16	17	Pos	Points
2021	Jay Howard Driver Development	ATL; 1	ATL; 2	ATL; 3	ROA; 1	ROA; 2	ROA; 3	MOH; 1	MOH; 2	MOH; 3	BRA; 1	BRA; 2	BRA; 3	VIR; 1	VIR; 2	VIR; 3	COA; 1; 20	COA; 2; 19	35th	0

=== Complete IMSA Prototype Challenge results ===
(key) (Races in bold indicate pole position; results in italics indicate fastest lap)

Year	Entrant	Class	Chassis	Engine	1	2	3	4	5	Rank	Points
2022	JDC MotorSports	LMP3	Duqueine M30 - D08	Nissan VK56 V8 5.6L	**DAY**; 3	**MOH**; 1	MOS; 5	VIR; 2	ATL; 2	2nd	1550

=== Complete IMSA SportsCar Championship results ===
(key) (Races in bold indicate pole position) (Races in italics indicate fastest lap)

Year	Entrant	Class	Chassis	Engine	1	2	3	4	5	6	7	Pos.	Pts
2023	Performance Tech Motorsports	LMP3	Ligier JS P320	Nissan VK56 V8 5.6L	DAY	SEB	WGL	MOS	ELK	IMS; 9	ATL	36th	248

=== Complete HSR Prototype Challenge results ===
(key) (Races in bold indicate pole position; results in italics indicate fastest lap)

Year	Entrant	Class	Chassis	Engine	1	2	3	4	5	Rank	Points
2024	Wolf Motorsports	LMP3	Ligier JS P320	Nissan VK56 V8 5.6L	**SEB**; 2	**ATL 1**; 1	**GLN**; 1	**ATL 2**; 2	**DAY**; 1	1st	36

=== American open–wheel results ===
==== Indy NXT ====
(key) (Races in bold indicate pole position) (Races in italics indicate fastest lap) (Races with ^{L} indicate a race lap led) (Races with * indicate most race laps led)

Year	Team	1	2	3	4	5	6	7	8	9	10	11	12	13	14	15	16	17	Rank	Points
2026	Juncos Hollinger Racing	STP; 20	ARL; 16	BAR; 13	BAR; 22	IMS; 19	IMS; 17	DET; 16	GAT; 24	ROA; 23	ROA; 14	MOH; 19	MOH; 24	NSS; 14	POR; 18	MIL; 10	LAG; 16	LAG; 18	21st	207
