= 2017 USAC National Midget Series =

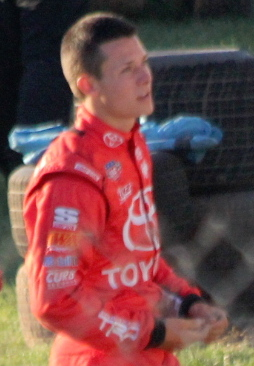
champion Spencer Bayston

The 2017 USAC National Midget Series is the 62nd season of the USAC National Midget Series. The series began with the Shamrock Classic at Southern Illinois Center on March 18, and will end with the Turkey Night Grand Prix at Ventura Raceway on November 23. Tanner Thorson came into the season as the defending champion. Spencer Bayston won the series championship driving for Keith Kunz/Curb-Agajanian Motorsports in the #97 Bullet by Spike Chassis / Speedway Toyota.

== Team and Driver Chart ==
No.	Race Driver	Car Owner / Entrant	Chassis	Engine	Rounds
1	Scott Hatton	Hatton Motorsports	Stealth	Honda	2
1	Kyle Larson	Keith Kunz/Curb-Agajanian Motorsports	Bullet by Spike	Speedway Toyota	1
1k	Brayton Lynch	Rusty Kunz Racing	Spike	Stanton SR-11	19
1nz	Michael Pickens	Seamount Racing	King	GRD Toyota	6
1p	Terry Nichols	Terry Nichols	Spike	Chevrolet	2
1T	Tony Roney	Roney			1
2	Kellen Conover	Chris Baue	Triple X	Ecotech	1
2	Chris Baue	Chris Baue	Triple X	Ecotech	3
2	Chris Baue	Chris Baue	Spike	All Pro Gaerte	3
2	Ray Seach	Seach	Spike	Fontana	4
2	Bob Harr	Hamilton Motorsports/Halarr Racing	DRC	Toyota	1
2	Robby Josett	Robby Josett	Spike	Esslinger	1
2G	Terry Goodwin	Misty Goodwin	Spike	Fontana	4
2JD	Tyler Edwards	Shenanigans-Neverlift Motorsports	Spike	AMS Chevrolet	1
3B	Shelby Bosie	Shelby Bosie	Spike	Fontana	3
3F	Geoff Ensign	Ted Finkenbinder	Bullet	Warrior	1
3H	Mike Hess	Jim Neuman	Spike	Stanton SR-11	1
3N	Jake Neuman	Neuman	Spike	Stanton SR-11	7
4A	Logan Seavey	RAMS Racing	BOSS	Speedway Toyota	1
4D	Robert Dalby	Ken Dalby	Spike	Esslinger	2
4R	Ryan Greth	Wayne Lesher	Hyper Racing	Stanton SR-11	11
5	Kyle Cummins	Briscoe			1
5	Chris Windom	Baldwin Brothers Racing	Spike	Claxton Ford	4
5	P.J. Gargiulo	JHG Racing	Elite	Esslinger	2
5	Chase Briscoe	Chase Briscoe Racing	Spike	Honda	1
5c	Colten Cottle	Rick Cottle	DRC	Esslinger	2
5D	Zach Daum	Daum Motorsports	Eagle	Speedway Toyota	6
5J	Jeff Crook	Jeff Crook Racing	Boss	Gaerte	1
6B	Brad Kraus	Brad Kraus	Spike	Brayton Ford	4
7	Gage Walker	Brian Walker	Spike	Esslinger	8
7	Troy Simpson	Hamilton Motorsports	DRC	Musser	2
7	Shannon McQueen	McQueen Racing	Boss	Esslinger	1
7A	Justin Allgaier	Allgaier Motorsports	Boss	Speedway	1
7B	Kevin Thomas Jr.	Brown	Boss	Speedway Toyota	2
7BC	Tyler Courtney	Clauson-Marshall Racing	Spike	Stanton SR-11	All
7J	Shawn Jackson	Shawn Jackson	Elite	Esslinger	3
7K	Justin Peck	K & R Racing	Stealth	Esslinger Ford	3
7MF	Chance Morton	Blane Morton	Spike	Esslinger	5
7R	Clayton Ruston	CR Motorsports	Spike	Esslinger	1
7u	Joe B. Miller	Trifecta Motorsports	Spike	Esslinger	2
7x	Paul Raynes	Seven LLC	Mal-1	Speedway Chevrolet	1
7x	Dan Biner	Seven LLC	Mal-1	Speedway Chevrolet	1
8	Ryan Secrest	Blane Morton	Spike	Esslinger	1
8	Randi Pankratz	Wally Pankratz	Edmunds	Fontana	1
8GQ	Jimi Quin	Jimi Quin	Spike	Mopar	3
8jr	Bear Wood	LW Racing	Felker	Gaerte	2
8M	Kade Morton	Blane Morton	Spike	Esslinger	5
9	Korey Weyant	Allen			1
9D	Michael Faccinto	Sean Dodenhoff	Spike	Fontana	2
9E	Mack DeMan	Sean Dodenhoff	Spike	Fontana	1
9k	Kyle Schuett	Schuett Racing Inc.	DRC	Mopar	5
9p	Steve Buckwalter	Scott Ronk	Spike	Esslinger	2
04	Kyle Jones	Jeromy Hefler	Triple X	Hawk	5
07	Jimmy Glenn	Glenn Motorsports	Spike	Kriner Chevrolet	3
10	Lance Bennett	Bennett Motorsports	Spike	GAM Chevrolet	1
11	Dave Darland	Gray Auto	Spike	Toyota	11
11	Eric Heydenreich	Rich Heyendreich	Spike	Gaerte	3
11B	Brent Beauchamp	B & B Motorsports	Spike	Esslinger	6
11c	Chett Gehrke	Skip & Diana Matteson	Spike	Fontana	2
11cw	Glenn Waterland	Glenn & Hayley Waterland	Beast	Gaerte	2
11E	Cory Elliott	Mitch Elliott	Spike	Esslinger	2
11Y	Travis Young	Travis Young	Beast	Esslinger	1
12	Josh Heckman	Randy Heckman	Elite	Ott	3
12w	Billy Wease	Wease			2
14	Trevor Kobylarz	RT Racing	Elite	Hawk	2
14K	Noah Key	Scott Key	FSC	Esslinger	1
15	Ron Hazelton	Ron Hazelton	Beast	Stanton Mopar	2
15G	Carson Garrett	Broc Garrett	Spike	RSI Esslinger	1
15F	Cole Fehr	Live Loud Racing	Spike	Gaerte	4
15M	Shane Morgan	Morgan			1
15s	Mitchell Davis	Morgan			1
16	Ashley Oerter	RKO Management	Hawk	Oldsmobile	4
17	Cody Swanson	Swanson Family/West Evans Motorsports	Spike	Esslinger	1
17c	Devin Camfield	Camfield Racing	Stealth	Sesee Mopar	2
17G	Dustin Golobic	Matt Wood	Spike	Esslinger	2
17k	Michael Koontz	Michael Koontz	Spike	Tranter Esslinger	4
17o	Ryan Secrest	Michael Koontz	Spike	Tranter Esslinger	2
17W	Shane Golobic	Clauson-Marshall Racing with Matt Wood	Spike	Stanton SR-11	All
20	Cody Weisensel	Kevin Weisensel	Stealth	Esslinger	1
20	Collin Rinehart	Collin Rinehart Racing	TCR	Pontiac	4
20AZ	Shon Deskins	Shon Deskins Racing	Spike	Chevrolet	1
21	Christopher Bell	Keith Kunz/Curb-Agajanian Motorsports	Bullet by Spike	Speedway Toyota	7
21	Rico Abreu	Keith Kunz/Curb-Agajanian Motorsports	Bullet by Spike	Speedway Toyota	5
21	Kyle Larson	Keith Kunz/Curb-Agajanian Motorsports	Bullet by Spike	Speedway Toyota	2
21	Ryan Robinson	Keith Kunz/Curb-Agajanian Motorsports	Bullet by Spike	Speedway Toyota	2
21	Bobby Kunsman Jr.	Kunsman Racing	Elite	Hawk	1
21	Tommy Kunsman Jr.	Kunsman Racing	Elite	Hawk	1
21D	Justin Dickerson	Mike Dickerson	Spike	Esslinger	5
22	Andy Malpocker	Malpocker			1
22	Chase Jones	Petry-Goff Motorsports	Spike	Esslinger	5
22Q	David Prickett	Neverlift Motorsports	Spike	AMS Chevrolet	2
23m	Kenny Miller III	The Racing Millers	Spike	Esslinger	4
25	Jerry Coons Jr.	Petry-Goff Motorsports	Spike	Stanton Toyota	17
25	Kevin Thomas Jr.	Petry-Goff Motorsports	Spike	Stanton Toyota	1
25	Courtney Crone	Jerome Rodela	Breka	Ed Pink Toyota	1
25B	Steve Buckwalter	Brian Buckwalter	Elite	Chevrolet	3
25c	Courtney Crone	Jerome Rodela	Breka	Ed Pink Toyota	4
25x	Ronnie Gardner	Jerome Rodela	King	Ed Pink Toyota	6
25x	Michael Pickens	Jerome Rodela	King	Ed Pink Toyota	2
27	Tucker Klaasmeyer	Dale Klaasmeyer	Boss	Speedway Toyota	5
28	Kory Schudy	Sawyer			1
28	Alex Schutte	Schutte-McElwee Racing	Spike	Esslinger	1
29	Joey Moughan	Joey Moughan	Boss	Esslinger	1
29	Landon Simon	Clover Motorsports	Elite	Fontana	4
29s	Timmy Buckwalter	Seymour Performance	Spike	Mopar	3
31	David Budres	Manic Racing	Stealth	Fontana	2
31	Kyle Beilman	Bill Beilman	Beast	Mopar	2
32	Trey Marcham	Bob Marcham	Spike	Esslinger	6
32	Nick Hamilton	Mike Hamilton	Spike	Esslinger	1
33	Davey Ray	Team RAYPRO	Spike	RAYPRO Mopar	6
33	D.J. Raw	Team RAYPRO	Spike	RAYPRO Mopar	3
33m	Mason Daniel	Scott Daniel	Spike	Esslinger	2
35	Chris Baue	Baue			1
35	Scott Pierovich	Lance Pierovich	Spike	Wirth Fontana	1
35T	Tyler Robbins	Scott Robbins	Bullet	Fontana	1
37	Andrew Felker	A.J. Felker	FSC	Felker Esslinger	2
39	Zeb Wise	Clauson-Marshall Racing	Spike	Stanton SR-11	2
39BC	Justin Grant	Clauson-Marshall Racing	Spike	Stanton SR-11	All
43	Ryan Oerter	RKO Management	Stealth	Esslinger	4
43A	Zach Middleton	RKO Management	Stealth	Esslinger	2
44	Anton Julian	Pace Brothers Racing	Spike	Esslinger	2
46	Brent Arndt	Essay Racing	Bullet	Fontana	3
46x	Kenney Johnson	Jeff Johnson	Spike	Autocraft	3
47	Gage Walker	Cappy Mason	Spike	Mopar	1
47	Tyler Nelson	Cappy Mason	Spike	Mopar	3
48	Randy Oerter	RKO Management	Buzzard	Esslinger	4
50	Tony DiMattia	Tony DiMattia Motorsports	Spike	Esslinger	7
50	Daniel Adler	Mike Adler	Triple X	Esslinger	1
50A	Daniel Adler	Mike Adler	Triple X	Esslinger	1
51B	Joe B. Miller	Grogan			1
52	Isaac Chapple	Chapple			1
55	Nick Knepper	Steve Knepper	Boss	Mopar	1
55	Kyle Smith	Tony Everhart	Ellis	Ford	1
56	Daniel Robinson	Fifty6x Racing	Boss	Fontana	1
56v	Matt Veatch	Fifty6x Racing	Spike	Fontana	3
56x	Mark Chisholm	Fifty6x Race Team	Boss	Toyota	5
57	Jason Rice	Wayne Rice	Stealth	Gaerte Ford	1
57	Maria Cofer	Johnny Cofer	Spike	Esslinger	2
57D	Daniel Robinson	McCreery Motorsports	Triple X	Esslinger	4
63	Brad Sweet	Dooling-Hayward Motorsports	Spike	Stanton SR-11	1
63x	Frankie Guerrini	F&F Racing	Spike	Esslinger	2
67	Tanner Thorson	Keith Kunz/Curb-Agajanian Motorsports	Bullet by Spike	Speedway Toyota	All
67k	Holly Shelton	Keith Kunz/Curb-Agajanian Motorsports	Bullet by Spike	Speedway Toyota	22
68	Jeff Zelinski	SFH			1
68	Ronnie Gardner	Six8 Motorsports	Stewart	Esslinger	2
69	Paul Babich	Hamilton Motorsports/Halarr Racing	DRC	Gaerte	2
71	Ryan Robinson	Keith Kunz/Curb-Agajanian Motorsports	Bullet by Spike	Speedway Toyota	16
71 1/2	Robert Bell	Robert Bell Motorsports	Zero	Ecotech	4
71K	Tanner Carrick	Keith Kunz/Curb-Agajanian Motorsports	Bullet by Spike	Speedway Toyota	22
71x	Bryan Drollinger	Drollinger Bros. Racing	Stealth	Arias	1
73	Jake Swanson	Keith Ford	TCR	Esslinger	1
73T	Dave Darland	Keith Ford	TCR	Esslinger	1
73x	Carson Macedo	Keith Ford	TCR	Esslinger	1
74	Steve Buckwalter	Jamie Speers	Elite	Chevrolet	1
75	Matt Mitchell	Wiley Miller	TCR	Esslinger	2
76E	Adam Pierson	Joe Mancini	Spike	Esslinger	8
76m	Brady Bacon	FMR Racing	Beast	Toyota	All
77	Alex Bright	Alex Bright Racing	Boss	Stanton SR-11	14
77L	Andrew Layser	Alex Bright Racing	Elite	Fontana	4
77J	John Klabunde	John Klabunde	Spike	Ostrich	1
77w	Joey Wirth	Joey Wirth	Boss	Esslinger	1
77u	Chris Urlsh	Pollock			1
82	Mike Hess	Callahan Motorsports	Buzzard	JAMR Ford	1
84	Chad Boat	Tucker-Boat Motorsports	CBI	Speedway Toyota	22
84s	Shaun Shapel	Shaun Shapel	Beast	Gaerte Chevrolet	1
85	Shane Hollingsworth	Hollingsworth			1
85	Matt Johnson	Central Motorsports	Spike	Stanton Mopar	4
87	Dalton Camfield	Camfield Racing	Stealth	Stanton Mopar	1
87	Jake Vermeer	Johnny Vermeer	TCR	Esslinger	1
87c	Dalton Camfield	Camfield Racing	Stealth	Stanton Mopar	1
88	Terry Babb	Terry Babb	Spike	Ford	2
88	Scott Orr	Orr			1
88N	D.J. Netto	James & Frank Netto	Spike	Sala Chevrolet	1
88T	Tyler Nelson	Tyler Nelson Racing	Spike	Gaerte	5
91	Tyler Nelson	Harris Racing	Spike	Fontana	4
91	Jeff Stasa	SBR Motorsports	Spike	Gaerte	1
91A	Chris Andrews	Thomas			1
91BT	Dave Darland	Brian Thomas	Spike	Esslinger	1
91s	Jeff Stasa	SBR Motorsports	Spike	Gaerte	3
91s	Ty Williams	SBR Motorsports	Spike	Gaerte	1
91T	Tyler Thomas	Brian Thomas	Spike	Esslinger	15
92	Brenden Bright	Ted Bright	STS	Esslinger	3
92M	Josh Most	Most			1
95	Jim Radney	Jim Radney	Hyper	Esslinger	2
96	Tyler Rankin	Tyler Rankin	Beast	Hogue Chevrolet	2
96	Cody Brewer	Central Motorsports	Spike	Bailey Chevrolet	3
97	Spencer Bayston	Keith Kunz/Curb-Agajanian Motorsports	Bullet by Spike Chassis	Speedway Toyota	All
97k	Rico Abreu	Keith Kunz/Curb-Agajanian Motorsports	Bullet by Spike Chassis	Speedway Toyota	4
98	Clinton Boyles	Joe Boyles	Stealth	Esslinger	1
98	Danny Stratton	American Motorsports	Edmunds	Fontana	1
99	Rob Marhefka	FM Racing Promotions	Stealth	Gaerte Chevrolet	2
99	Colton Heath				1

== Schedule ==
The entire season will be broadcast on-demand by Loudpedal.TV. Select races were broadcast live by Speed Shift TV.

No.	Date	Race title	Track	TV/Stream
1	March 18	Shamrock Classic	Southern Illinois Center	Speed Shift TV Loudpedal.TV
2	April 7	Kokomo Grand Prix	Kokomo Speedway	Speed Shift TV Loudpedal.TV
3	April 8	Kokomo Grand Prix	Kokomo Speedway	Speed Shift TV Loudpedal.TV
≠	May 19		Tri-City Speedway	
4	June 6	Indiana Midget Week	Montpelier Motor Speedway	Loudpedal.TV
5	June 7	Indiana Midget Week	Gas City I-69 Speedway	Speed Shift TV Loudpedal.TV
6	June 8	Indiana Midget Week	Lincoln Park Speedway	Loudpedal.TV
7	June 9	Indiana Midget Week	Bloomington Speedway	Speed Shift TV Loudpedal.TV
8	June 10	Indiana Midget Week	Lawrenceburg Speedway	Loudpedal.TV
9	June 11	Indiana Midget Week	Kokomo Speedway	Speed Shift TV Loudpedal.TV
10	July 1		Macon Speedway	Loudpedal.TV
11	July 2		Lincoln Speedway	Loudpedal.TV
12	July 3	Adam Lopez Illinois Midget Nationals	Illinois State Fairgrounds Multi-Purpose Arena	Speed Shift TV Loudpedal.TV
13	August 1	Tuesday Night Thunder	Jefferson County Speedway	Speed Shift TV Loudpedal.TV
14	August 2	Chad McDaniel Memorial	Solomon Valley Raceway	Speed Shift TV Loudpedal.TV
15	August 4	Belleville Midget Nationals	Belleville High Banks	Speed Shift TV Loudpedal.TV
16	August 5	Belleville Midget Nationals	Belleville High Banks	Speed Shift TV Loudpedal.TV
17	August 14	Pennsylvania Midget Week	Susquehanna Speedway	Loudpedal.TV
18	August 15	Pennsylvania Midget Week	Path Valley Speedway Park	Loudpedal.TV
19	August 16	Pennsylvania Midget Week	Lanco's Clyde Martin Memorial Speedway	Loudpedal.TV
20	August 17	Pennsylvania Midget Week	Linda's Speedway	Loudpedal.TV
21	September 23	36th Annual 4-Crown Nationals	Eldora Speedway	EldoraSpeedway.com Loudpedal.TV
≠	October 22	Jason Leffler Memorial	Wayne County Speedway	
22	November 18		Bakersfield Speedway	Speed Shift TV Loudpedal.TV
23	November 23	Turkey Night Grand Prix	Ventura Raceway	Speed Shift TV Loudpedal.TV
*	December 16	Junior Knepper 55	Southern Illinois Center	Speed Shift TV Loudpedal.TV

co-sanctioned race with POWRi National Midgets
combination race with USAC Western States Midgets
combination race with USAC/ARDC Midgets
- - * will state if the race is a non points event.
- - ≠ will state if the race was postponed or canceled

=== Schedule notes and changes ===
- - The May 19 race at Tri-City Speedway was canceled due to weather. No makeup date was scheduled.
- - The Jason Leffler Memorial at Wayne County Speedway was canceled due to weather. No makeup date was scheduled.

== Results and standings ==
=== Races ===
No.	Race / Track	Winning driver	Winning team	Hard Charger Award winner	B-main/Semi winners
1	Shamrock Classic	Justin Grant	Clauson-Marshall Racing	Shane Golobic	Brady Bacon Shane Golobic
2	Kokomo Grand Prix	Brady Bacon	FMR Racing	Tyler Thomas	Holly Shelton
3	Kokomo Grand Prix	Brady Bacon	FMR Racing	Rico Abreu	Kevin Thomas Jr.
4	Indiana Midget Week (Montpelier)	Tyler Courtney	Clauson Marshall Racing	Shane Golobic	Tyler Thomas
5	Indiana Midget Week (Gas City)	Michael Pickens	Seamount Racing	Ronnie Gardner	Michael Pickens
6	Indiana Midget Week (Lincoln Park)	Michael Pickens	Seamount Racing	Tyler Courtney	Shane Golobic
7	Indiana Midget Week (Bloomington)	Tyler Courtney	Clauson Marshall Racing	Tyler Courtney	Tyler Courtney
8	Indiana Midget Week (Lawrenceburg)	Rico Abreu	Keith Kunz/Curb-Agajanian Motorsports	Shane Golobic	Tanner Carrick
9	Indiana Midget Week (Kokomo)	Spencer Bayston	Keith Kunz/Curb-Agajanian Motorsports	Chad Boat	Gage Walker
10	Macon	Christopher Bell	Keith Kunz/Curb-Agajanian Motorsports	Shane Golobic	Zach Daum
11	Lincoln	Christopher Bell	Keith Kunz/Curb-Agajanian Motorsports	Ryan Robinson	Brady Bacon
12	Adam Lopez Illinois Midget Nationals	Tyler Courtney	Clauson Marshall Racing	Dave Darland	Ryan Robinson
13	Tuesday Night Thunder	Tanner Thorson	Keith Kunz/Curb-Agajanian Motorsports	Jerry Coons Jr.	Chett Gehrke
14	Chad McDaniel Memorial	Christopher Bell	Keith Kunz/Curb-Agajanian Motorsports	Joe B. Miller	Spencer Bayston
15	Belleville Midget Nationals	Chad Boat	Tucker-Boat Motorsports	Tyler Courtney	
16	Belleville Midget Nationals	Spencer Bayston	Keith Kunz/Curb-Agajanian Motorsports	Brady Bacon	
17	Pennsylvania Midget Week (Susquehanna)	Justin Grant	Clauson/Marshall Racing	Tanner Carrick	Adam Pierson
18	Pennsylvania Midget Week (Path Valley)	Chad Boat	Tucker-Boat Motorsports	Ryan Greth	
19	Pennsylvania Midget Week (Lanco)	Tanner Thorson	Keith Kunz/Curb-Agajanian Motorsports	Landon Simon	
20	Pennsylvania Midget Week (Linda's)	Chad Boat	Tucker-Boat Motorsports	Landon Simon	
21	Four Crown Nationals	Spencer Bayston	Keith Kunz/Curb-Agajanian Motorsports	Holly Shelton	
22	November Classic	Brady Bacon	FMR Racing	Shane Golobic	Brady Bacon
23	Turkey Night Grand Prix	Christopher Bell	Keith Kunz/Curb-Agajanian Motorsports	Ryan Robinson	Holly Shelton
*	Junior Knepper 55	Christopher Bell	Keith Kunz/Curb-Agajanian Motorsports		Daniel Robinson & Jake Neuman
