= Courtney Crone =

American racing driver (born 2001)

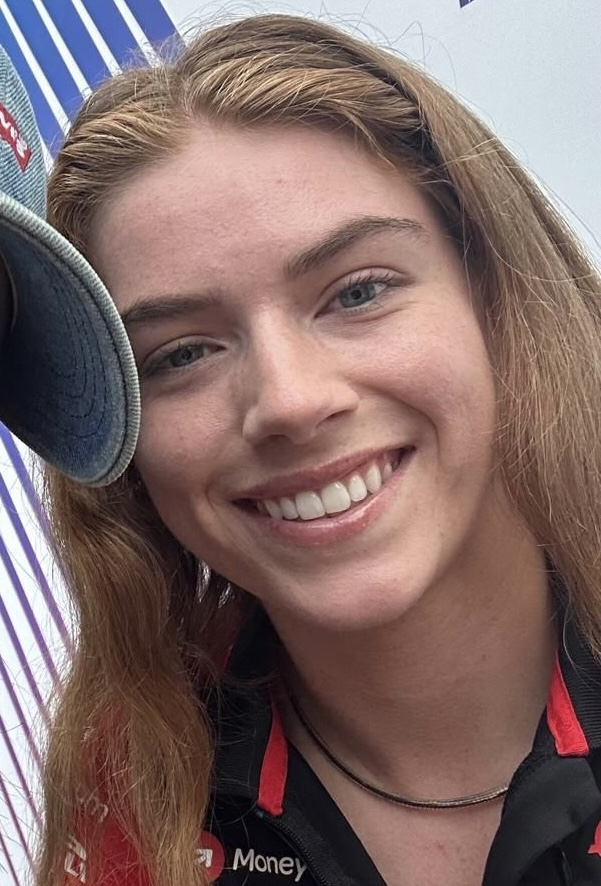
- Crone at the 2025 Singapore Grand Prix
- Nationality: American
- Born: March 7, 2001 (age 25) Corona, California, U.S.

F1 Academy
- Categorisation: FIA Silver
- Years active: 2024–2025
- Teams: Prema Racing, ART Grand Prix
- Car number: 7 (Note: Crone used the number 77 during the 2024 season.)
- Starts: 16
- Wins: 0
- Podiums: 0
- Poles: 0
- Fastest laps: 0
- Best finish: 19th in 2025

Previous series
- 2024; 2023; 2023; 2021–2022; 2020: Lamborghini Super Trofeo NA; IMSA SportsCar Challenge; Prototype Cup Germany; IMSA Prototype Challenge; Formula Pro USA

Courtney Crone (born March 7, 2001) is an American racing driver who competed in F1 Academy for ART Grand Prix as part of the Haas Driver Development Program.

Crone previously competed in the IMSA VP Racing SportsCar Challenge and the USAC Western Midget Series.

== Career ==
=== Early career ===
Crone started racing in quarter midgets in 2005, at just four years old. At the age of eleven, she started racing Junior Speedway, winning three track championships in the 150cc Motorcycle class before stepping up to the 250cc class. Crone won the 2016 Perris Auto Speedway Young Guns Championship in Sprint Cars with six wins. She was also the 2016 USAC Western States Midget Rookie of the Year, ending the season in fifth after making 14 feature race starts. In 2017, she made four feature race starts in the USAC National Midget Series.

=== Single-seaters ===
In 2016, Crone won three Formula Mazda races in her three starts. She was also selected as a Women's Motorsports Foundation Project Podium recipient by IndyCar driver Lyn St. James.

Crone was awarded the 2017 VMB Driver Development Racing Scholarship, which gave her an opportunity to race in the Formula Car Challenge. She placed third in the FormulaSPEED class, with 13 podiums in 14 starts. In 2018, she continued in the series, this time winning the championship. She was then invited to compete in the Mazda Road to Indy Shootout, aiming for a scholarship into the USF2000 Championship. She was also one of ten drivers nominated for the Team USA Scholarship.

Crone was invited to the shootout for both the 2019 and 2020 seasons of the W Series, but was not selected to race in either. For the 2019 Formula F season, Crone raced with Brad Hayes Racing, winning two races and earning a podium finish in all four of her starts. She also contested the final round of the Formula 4 United States Championship with World Speed Motorsports. In 2020, she finished fourth in the Formula Pro USA F4 Championship. She had three podiums, one fastest lap, and one win.

=== Prototypes ===
Crone shifted focus to prototypes in 2021, racing in the IMSA Prototype Challenge, where she finished eighth with three top-ten finishes. In the same year, she received the Gorsline Scholarship, joining notable past recipients such as Buddy Rice and Josef Newgarden. She moved to Jr III Racing for the 2022 season, where she finished sixth with a best race finish of fifth.

In 2023, Crone contested the IMSA VP Racing SportsCar Challenge, which replaced the Prototype Challenge as a championship. She was awarded the 2023 IMSA Diverse Driver Development Scholarship, after being a finalist in 2022. She finished the season in fourth, with six podiums to her name. She also competed overseas for the first time, in the Prototype Cup Germany. She and Gabriela Jílková were the first women to compete in the series. Crone achieved two top-ten finishes in seven starts.

=== Sports cars ===
For the 2024 season, Crone moved to the Lamborghini Super Trofeo North America.

=== F1 Academy ===
In August 2024, Crone returned to single-seaters to race in Round 2 of the 2024 F1 Academy season at Miami, competing as a wildcard entry for Prema Racing. Crone got her first experience in the car during in-season testing at Zandvoort, before going on to finish 14th and 11th at her home races in Miami. Later that year, it was announced that Crone would race for ART Grand Prix representing Haas for the 2025 season. Crone earned her first points finish in Round 6 at Singapore, where she finished in tenth place in Race 2. Her second points finish was in Round 7 at Las Vegas, where she finished 7th in Race 1. She scored three points in the 2025 season and finished 19th overall in the drivers' standings.

== Racing record ==
=== Racing career summary ===
Year	Series	Team	Races	Wins	Podiums	Poles	F/Laps	Points	Position
2016	USAC Western States Midget Series	N/A	14	0	1	0	0	713	5th
2016	USAC National Midget Series	Rodela	1	0	0	0	0	N/A	N/A
2017	SCCA Majors Championship Western Conference - Formula Atlantic	N/A	4	0	0	0	0	66	4th
2017	SCCA Majors Championship Nationwide - Formula Atlantic	N/A	4	0	0	0	0	66	13th
2017	Formula Car Challenge West Coast - FS	N/A	14	0	13	0	0	294	**3rd**
2017	USAC Western States Midget Series	N/A	12	0	0	0	0	562	6th
2017	USAC National Midget Series	Jerome Rodela	4	0	0	0	0	N/A	N/A
2018	SCCA Majors Championship Western Conference - Formula Atlantic	N/A	10	0	2	0	0	131	4th
2018	Formula Car Challenge National Championship - Formulaspeed 2.0	N/A	14	9	14	0	0	333	**1st**
2018	SCCA Majors Championship Nationwide - Formula Atlantic	N/A	4	0	0	0	0	58	12th
2018	F1600 Championship Series	N/A	3	0	0	0	0	13	32nd
2019	SCCA Majors Nationwide - Formula F	N/A	4	2	4	0	0	89	9th
2019	F4 United States Championship	World Speed Motorsports	2	0	0	0	0	0	40th
2020	Formula Pro USA - F4 Western Championship	World Speed Motorsports	6	1	3	1	0	96	4th
2020	USAC National Midget Series	Rodela	1	0	0	0	0	N/A	N/A
2021	IMSA Prototype Challenge - LMP3-1	Forty7 Motorsports	6	0	0	0	0	1200	8th
2021	35th Annual Chili Bowl Midget Nationals	Tom Malloy	2	0	0	0	0	N/A	N/A
2022	IMSA Prototype Challenge	Jr III Racing	5	0	0	0	0	1110	6th
2023	Prototype Cup Germany	Gebhardt Motorsport	7	0	0	0	0	46	17th
2023	IMSA VP Racing SportsCar Challenge - LMP3	Forty7 Motorsports	12	0	6	0	0	3290	4th
2024	Lamborghini Super Trofeo North America - Pro-Am	World Speed Motorsports	2	0	0	0	0	4	24th
2024	F1 Academy	Prema Racing	2	0	0	0	0	0	20th
2025	Eurocup-4 Spanish Winter Championship	ART Grand Prix	0	0	0	0	0	0	NC
2025	F1 Academy	ART Grand Prix	14	0	0	0	0	3	19th
2026	World Racing League - GTO	888 Racing	6	1	1	0	0	0	NC†
2026	IMSA VP Racing SportsCar Challenge - GSX	CarBahn Motorsports	12	0	7	0	0	3540	**2nd**

* Season still in progress.

=== Complete F4 United States Championship results ===
(key) (Races in bold indicate pole position; races in italics indicate fastest lap)

Year	Team	1	2	3	4	5	6	7	8	9	10	11	12	13	14	15	16	17	Rank	Points
2019	World Speed Motorsports	ATL	ATL	ATL	PIT	PIT	PIT	VIR	VIR	VIR	MOH	MOH	MOH	SEB	SEB	SEB	COA; 15	COA; 21	40th	0

=== Complete F1 Academy results ===
(key) (Races in bold indicate pole position; races in italics indicate fastest lap)

Year	Entrant	1	2	3	4	5	6	7	8	9	10	11	12	13	14	15	DC	Points
2024	Prema Racing	JED; 1	JED; 2	MIA; 1; 14	MIA; 2; 11	CAT; 1	CAT; 2	ZAN; 1	ZAN; 2	SIN; 1	SIN; 2	LSL; 1	LSL; 2	YMC; 1	YMC; 2	YMC; 3	20th	0
2025	ART Grand Prix	SHA; 1; 12	SHA; 2; 12	JED; 1 Ret	JED; 2; 12	MIA; 1; 9	MIA; 2 C	MTL; 1; 11	MTL; 2; 12	MTL; 3 Ret	ZAN; 1; 13	ZAN; 2; 11	SIN; 1; 13	SIN; 2; 10	LVG; 1; 7	LVG; 2; 13	19th	3

=== Complete Eurocup-4 Spanish Winter Championship results ===
(key) (Races in bold indicate pole position) (Races in italics indicate fastest lap)

Year	Team	1	2	3	4	5	6	7	8	9	DC	Points
2025	ART Grand Prix	JER; 1 WD	JER; 2 WD	JER; 3 WD	POR; 1	POR; 2	POR; 3	NAV; 1	NAV; 2	NAV; 3	NC	0

=== Complete IMSA VP Racing SportsCar Challenge results ===
(key) (Races in bold indicate pole position; races in italics indicate fastest lap)

Year	Entrant	Class	Make	Engine	1	2	3	4	5	6	7	8	9	10	11	12	Rank	Points
2023	Forty7 Motorsports	LMP3	Duqueine D08	Nissan VK56DE 5.6 L V8	DAY; 1; 8	DAY; 2; 3	SEB; 1; 7	SEB; 2; 10	MOS; 1; 3	MOS; 2; 4	LIM; 1; 5	LIM; 2; 3	VIR; 1; 3	VIR; 2; 6	ATL; 1; 2	ATL; 2; 3	4th	3290
2026	CarBahn Motorsports	GSX	BMW M4 GT4 Evo (G82)	BMW S58B30T0 3.0 L Twin Turbo I6	DAY; 1; 7	DAY; 2; 4	AUS; 1; 2	AUS; 2; 2	MOH; 1; 4	MOH; 2; 7	MOS; 1; 4	MOS; 2; 2	VIR; 1; 3	VIR; 2; 2	ATL; 1; 2	ATL; 2; 2	2nd	3540
