= 2021 IMSA Prototype Challenge =

Season of the IMSA Lites series

The 2021 IMSA Prototype Challenge is the sixteenth season of the IMSA Lites series and its successors, and the fifth under the IMSA Prototype Challenge name. The season started on January 23 at Daytona International Speedway and concludes on November 12 at Michelin Raceway Road Atlanta.

== Calendar ==
The provisional 2021 calendar was released on September 9, 2020. As of April 7, 2021 the calendar remains provisional and subject to change.

Round	Circuit	Location	Date
1	Daytona International Speedway	Daytona Beach, Florida	January 23
2	Sebring International Raceway	Sebring, Florida	March 14
3	Mid-Ohio Sports Car Course	Lexington, Ohio	May 16
4	Watkins Glen International	Watkins Glen, New York	July 2
5	Virginia International Raceway	Alton, Virginia	October 8
6	Michelin Raceway Road Atlanta	Braselton, Georgia	November 12

Calendar Changes

- All races are now 1 hour 45 minutes in length.
- Canadian Tire Motorsport Park (Mosport) returned to the calendar after being cancelled for 2020 due to the COVID-19 pandemic.
- Road America, which replaced Mosport in 2020, did not return for 2021.
- On April 7, 2021, Watkins Glen International replaced Canadian Tire Motorsport Park on the schedule due to COVID-19 restrictions. The new event is scheduled for July 2.

== Series News ==
- 2020-spec LMP3 cars will be allowed to compete in the championship for 2021. 2015-spec cars are still allowed. The classes will be called LMP3–1 (2020) and LMP3–2 (2015).
- Points will be awarded at 10x the amount awarded in 2020, points are still awarded down to 30th place.

== Entries ==
Team	Car	Engine	No.	Drivers	Class		Rounds
Team	Car	Engine	No.	Drivers	Car	Driver	Rounds
(United States) WIN Autosport	Duqueine M30 - D08	Nissan VK56DE 5.6 L V8	1	(United Kingdom) Matthew Bell	P3		1–2
(United States) WIN Autosport	Duqueine M30 - D08	Nissan VK56DE 5.6 L V8	1	(United States) Naveen Rao	P3		1–2
(United States) WIN Autosport	Duqueine M30 - D08	Nissan VK56DE 5.6 L V8	11	(United States) Steven Thomas	P3	B	1–2
(United States) Jr III Racing	Ligier JS P320	Nissan VK56DE 5.6 L V8	3	(United States) Eric Palmer	P3		1–2
(United States) Jr III Racing	Ligier JS P320	Nissan VK56DE 5.6 L V8	3	(United States) Greg Palmer	P3		1–2
(United States) Jr III Racing	Ligier JS P320	Nissan VK56DE 5.6 L V8	3	(United States) Terry Olson	P3		3, 6
(United States) Jr III Racing	Ligier JS P320	Nissan VK56DE 5.6 L V8	3	(United States) Mike Skeen	P3		3, 5–6
(United States) Jr III Racing	Ligier JS P320	Nissan VK56DE 5.6 L V8	3	(United States) Ken D'Arcy	P3	B	4
(United States) Jr III Racing	Ligier JS P320	Nissan VK56DE 5.6 L V8	3	(United States) Marc Sharinn	P3	B	4–5
(United States) Jr III Racing	Ligier JS P320	Nissan VK56DE 5.6 L V8	33	(United States) Ari Balogh	P3		1–2, 4–6
(United States) Jr III Racing	Ligier JS P320	Nissan VK56DE 5.6 L V8	33	(United States) Natasha Balogh	P3		1–2
(United States) Jr III Racing	Ligier JS P320	Nissan VK56DE 5.6 L V8	33	(Canada) Garett Grist	P3		4–6
(United States) Performance Tech Motorsports	Ligier JS P320	Nissan VK56DE 5.6 L V8	6	(United States) Dan Goldburg	P3		All
(United States) Performance Tech Motorsports	Ligier JS P320	Nissan VK56DE 5.6 L V8	6	(Sweden) Rasmus Lindh	P3		All
(United States) VOLT Racing with Archangel	Ligier JS P320	Nissan VK56DE 5.6 L V8	7	(United States) Alan Brynjolfsson	P3		All
(United States) VOLT Racing with Archangel	Ligier JS P320	Nissan VK56DE 5.6 L V8	7	(United States) Trent Hindman	P3		All
(United States) JDC MotorSports	Duqueine M30 - D08	Nissan VK56DE 5.6 L V8	9	(Australia) Scott Andrews	P3		TBA
(United States) JDC MotorSports	Duqueine M30 - D08	Nissan VK56DE 5.6 L V8	9	(United States) Gerry Kraut	P3		TBA
(United States) JDC MotorSports	Duqueine M30 - D08	Nissan VK56DE 5.6 L V8	40	(United States) David Grant	P3	B	All
(United States) JDC MotorSports	Duqueine M30 - D08	Nissan VK56DE 5.6 L V8	40	(United States) Keith Grant	P3	B	All
(United States) D Motorsports	Ligier JS P3	Nissan VK50VE 5.0 L V8	15	(United States) Mike Watt	P3		5–6
(United States) D Motorsports	Ligier JS P3	Nissan VK50VE 5.0 L V8	15	(Sweden) Niclas Jönsson	P3		5–6
(United States) O'Gara Motorsport	Ligier JS P320	Nissan VK56DE 5.6 L V8	17	(United States) Jacob Eidson	P3		4–6
(United States) O'Gara Motorsport	Ligier JS P320	Nissan VK56DE 5.6 L V8	17	(United States) Brian Thienes	P3		4–6
(United States) Andretti Autosport	Ligier JS P320	Nissan VK56DE 5.6 L V8	18	(United States) Jarett Andretti	P3		1–2
(United States) Andretti Autosport	Ligier JS P320	Nissan VK56DE 5.6 L V8	18	(United States) Tristan Herbert	P3		1–2
(Belgium) Mühlner Motorsport America	Duqueine M30 - D08	Nissan VK56DE 5.6 L V8	21	(Germany) Laurents Hörr	P3		1–2
(Belgium) Mühlner Motorsport America	Duqueine M30 - D08	Nissan VK56DE 5.6 L V8	21	(Germany) Moritz Kranz	P3		All
(Belgium) Mühlner Motorsport America	Duqueine M30 - D08	Nissan VK56DE 5.6 L V8	21	(Belgium) Ugo de Wilde	P3		5–6
(Belgium) Mühlner Motorsport America	Duqueine M30 - D08	Nissan VK56DE 5.6 L V8	22	(United States) Tyler Maxson	P3		6
(Belgium) Mühlner Motorsport America	Duqueine M30 - D08	Nissan VK56DE 5.6 L V8	22	(United States) C. R. Crews	P3		6
(United States) Sean Creech Motorsport	Ligier JS P3	Nissan VK50VE 5.0 L V8	24	(United Kingdom) Nigel Greensall	P3	B	2
(United States) Sean Creech Motorsport	Ligier JS P3	Nissan VK50VE 5.0 L V8	24	(United States) Francesco Melandri	P3	B	2–4
(United States) Sean Creech Motorsport	Ligier JS P3	Nissan VK50VE 5.0 L V8	24	(United States) Lance Willsey	P3	B	3
(United States) Sean Creech Motorsport	Ligier JS P3	Nissan VK50VE 5.0 L V8	24	(United States) Anthony Lazzaro	P3	B	4
(Canada) Conquest Racing/JMF Motorsports (Canada) Conquest Racing	Duqueine M30 - D08	Nissan VK56DE 5.6 L V8	34	(Germany) Peter Ludwig	P3		1–2
(Canada) Conquest Racing/JMF Motorsports (Canada) Conquest Racing	Duqueine M30 - D08	Nissan VK56DE 5.6 L V8	34	(United States) James French	P3		1
(Canada) Conquest Racing/JMF Motorsports (Canada) Conquest Racing	Duqueine M30 - D08	Nissan VK56DE 5.6 L V8	34	(United States) Colin Mullan	P3		2–6
(Canada) Conquest Racing/JMF Motorsports (Canada) Conquest Racing	Duqueine M30 - D08	Nissan VK56DE 5.6 L V8	34	(Canada) Antoine Comeau	P3		3–6
(Canada) Conquest Racing/JMF Motorsports (Canada) Conquest Racing	Norma M30	Nissan VK50VE 5.0 L V8	61	(Canada) Danny Kok	P3	B	All
(Canada) Conquest Racing/JMF Motorsports (Canada) Conquest Racing	Norma M30	Nissan VK50VE 5.0 L V8	61	(Canada) George Staikos	P3	B	All
(United States) Robillard Racing	Duqueine M30 - D08	Nissan VK56DE 5.6 L V8	43	(United Kingdom) Stevan McAleer	P3		All
(United States) Robillard Racing	Duqueine M30 - D08	Nissan VK56DE 5.6 L V8	43	(United States) Joe Robillard	P3		All
(United States) CT Motorsports LLC	Duqueine M30 - D08	Nissan VK56DE 5.6 L V8	46	(United States) Scott Huffaker	P3		1–4, 6
(United States) CT Motorsports LLC	Duqueine M30 - D08	Nissan VK56DE 5.6 L V8	46	(United States) Steven Scullen	P3		1–4, 6
(United States) Forty7 Motorsports	Duqueine M30 - D08	Nissan VK56DE 5.6 L V8	47	(United States) Jon Brownson	P3		All
(United States) Forty7 Motorsports	Duqueine M30 - D08	Nissan VK56DE 5.6 L V8	47	(United States) Dario Cangialosi	P3		All
(United States) Forty7 Motorsports	Duqueine M30 - D08	Nissan VK56DE 5.6 L V8	74	(United States) Courtney Crone	P3		All
(United States) Forty7 Motorsports	Duqueine M30 - D08	Nissan VK56DE 5.6 L V8	74	(United States) Jason Rabe	P3		All
(United States) One Motorsports	Ligier JS P3	Nissan VK50VE 5.0 L V8	50	(United States) Indy Al Miller	P3	B	2
(United States) One Motorsports	Ligier JS P3	Nissan VK50VE 5.0 L V8	86	(United States) Bob Iversen	P3	B	1
(United States) One Motorsports	Ligier JS P3	Nissan VK50VE 5.0 L V8	86	(United States) Terry Olson	P3	B	1
(United States) One Motorsports	Ligier JS P320	Nissan VK56DE 5.6 L V8	81	(United States) Indy Al Miller	P3	B	1
(United States) One Motorsports	Ligier JS P320	Nissan VK56DE 5.6 L V8	81	(United States) Mel Johnson	P3	B	1
(United States) One Motorsports	Ligier JS P320	Nissan VK56DE 5.6 L V8	81	(United States) Mel Johnson	P3		2
(United States) One Motorsports	Ligier JS P320	Nissan VK56DE 5.6 L V8	81	(United States) Kenton Koch	P3		2
(United States) MLT Motorsports	Ligier JS P320	Nissan VK56DE 5.6 L V8	54	(United States) Dakota Dickerson	P3		All
(United States) MLT Motorsports	Ligier JS P320	Nissan VK56DE 5.6 L V8	54	(United States) Josh Sarchet	P3		All
(United States) Wulver Racing	Ligier JS P3	Nissan VK50VE 5.0 L V8	60	(United States) Bruce Hamilton	P3		1
(United States) Wulver Racing	Ligier JS P3	Nissan VK50VE 5.0 L V8	60	(Estonia) Tonis Kasemets	P3		1
(United States) Wulver Racing	Ligier JS P320	Nissan VK56DE 5.6 L V8	60	(Estonia) Tonis Kasemets	P3		2–6
(United States) Wulver Racing	Ligier JS P320	Nissan VK56DE 5.6 L V8	60	(United States) Bruce Hamilton	P3		2–6
(United States) Riley Motorsports	Ligier JS P320	Nissan VK56DE 5.6 L V8	91	(United States) Jim Cox	P3		3
(United States) Riley Motorsports	Ligier JS P320	Nissan VK56DE 5.6 L V8	91	(United States) Dylan Murry	P3		3

Icon	Class
Car
P3	LMP3-1
P3	LMP3-2
Driver
B	Bronze Cup

== Race results ==
Bold indicates the overall winner.

Rnd	Circuit	LMP3–1 Winners	LMP3–2 Winners	Ref.
1	Daytona	**(Belgium) #21 Mühlner Motorsport America**	(United States) #60 Wulver Racing	
1	Daytona	**(Germany) Laurents Hörr** **(Germany) Moritz Kranz**	(United States) Bruce Hamilton (Estonia) Tonis Kasemets	
2	Sebring	**(United States) #7 VOLT Racing with Archangel**	(United States) #24 Sean Creech Motorsport	
2	Sebring	**(United States) Alan Brynjolfsson** **(United States) Trent Hindman**	(United Kingdom) Nigel Greensall (United States) Francesco Melandri	
3	Mid-Ohio	**(Belgium) #21 Mühlner Motorsport America**	(United States) #24 Sean Creech Motorsport	
3	Mid-Ohio	**(Germany) Moritz Kranz**	(United States) Francesco Melandri (United States) Lance Willsey	
4	Watkins Glen	**(United States) #54 MLT Motorsports**	(United States) #24 Sean Creech Motorsport	
4	Watkins Glen	**(United States) Dakota Dickerson** **(United States) Josh Sarchet**	(United States) Anthony Lazzaro (United States) Francesco Melandri	
5	Virginia	**(United States) #6 Performance Tech Motorsports**	(United States) #15 D Motorsports	
5	Virginia	**(United States) Dan Goldburg** **(Sweden) Rasmus Lindh**	(Sweden) Niclas Jönsson (United States) Mike Watt	
6	Road Atlanta	**(Belgium) #21 Mühlner Motorsport America**	(United States) #15 D Motorsports	
6	Road Atlanta	**(Belgium) Ugo de Wilde** **(Germany) Moritz Kranz**	(Sweden) Niclas Jönsson (United States) Mike Watt	

== Championship standings ==
Points system

Position	1	2	3	4	5	6	7	8	9	10	11	12	13	14	15	16	17	18	19	20	21	22	23	24	25	26	27	28	29	30
Points	350	320	300	280	260	250	240	230	220	210	200	190	180	170	160	150	140	130	120	110	100	90	80	70	60	50	40	30	20	10

=== Driver's Championships ===
==== LMP3-1 ====
Pos.	Drivers	DAY	SEB	MOH	WGL	VIR	ATL	Points
1	(United States) Dakota Dickerson (United States) Josh Sarchet	2	3	3	1	2	5	1850
2	(Germany) Moritz Kranz	**1**	**5**	**1**	**2**	**10**	**1**	1840
3	(United States) Alan Brynjolfsson (United States) Trent Hindman	14	1	7	7	4	2	1600
4	(United States) Dan Goldburg (Sweden) Rasmus Lindh	15	2	12	3	1	9	1540
5	(United Kingdom) Stevan McAleer (United States) Joe Robillard	16	7	5	5	6	4	1440
6	(United States) David Grant (United States) Keith Grant	3	8	4	13	8	10	1430
7	(United States) Jon Brownson (United States) Dario Cagialosi	11	14	11	6	13	7	1240
8	(United States) Courtney Crone (United States) Jason Rabe	9	16	10	9	11	11	1200
9	(United States) Ari Balogh	12	15		4	3	6	1180
10	(United States) Bruce Hamilton (Estonia) Tonis Kasemets		11	8	12	9	8	1070
11	(United States) Scott Huffaker (United States) Steve Scullen	5	10	9	11		15	1050
12	(United States) Colin Mullan		12	6	8	12	14	1030
13	(United States) Mike Skeen			2		7	3	860
14	(Canada) Antoine Comeau			6	8	12	14	840
15	(Canada) Garett Grist				4	3	6	830
16	(United States) Jacob Eidson (United States) Brian Thienes				10	5	12	660
17	(United States) Terry Olson			2			3	620
18	(Germany) Laurents Hörr	**1**	**5**					610
19	(Belgium) Ugo de Wilde					**10**	**1**	560
20	(United Kingdom) Matthew Bell (United States) Naveen Rao	7	4					520
21	(United States) Mel Johnson	8	6					480
22	(United States) Steven Thomas	6	9					470
23	(United States) Jarett Andretti (United States) Tristan Herbert	4	17					420
24	(United States) Marc Sharinn				14	7		410
25	(United States) Eric Palmer (United States) Greg Palmer	10	13					390
26	(Germany) Peter Ludwig	13	12					370
27	(United States) Natasha Balogh	12	15					350
28	(United States) Kenton Koch		6					250
29	(United States) Indy Al Miller	8						230
30	(United States) Tyler Maxson (United States) C. R. Crews						13	180
31	(United States) James French	13						180
32	(United States) Ken D'Arcy				14			170
33	(United States) Jim Cox (United States) Dylan Murry			DNS				0
Pos.	Drivers	DAY	SEB	MOH	WGL	VIR	ATL	Points

Colour	Result
Gold	Winner
Silver	Second place
Bronze	Third place
Green	Points classification
Blue	Non-points classification
Blue	Non-classified finish (NC)
Purple	Retired, not classified (Ret)
Red	Did not qualify (DNQ)
Red	Did not pre-qualify (DNPQ)
Black	Disqualified (DSQ)
White	Did not start (DNS)
White	Withdrew (WD)
White	Race cancelled (C)
Blank	Did not practice (DNP)
Blank	Did not arrive (DNA)
Blank	Excluded (EX)

**Bold** - Pole position
Italics - Fastest lap

==== LMP3-2 ====
Pos.	Drivers	DAY	SEB	MOH	WGL	VIR	ATL	Points
1	(Canada) Danny Kok (Canada) George Staikos	2	**2**	2	2	2	2	1920
2	(United States) Francesco Melandri		1	**1**	**1**			1050
3	(United States) Mike Watt (Sweden) Niclas Jönsson					**1**	**1**	700
4	(United States) Bruce Hamilton (Estonia) Tonis Kasemets	**1**						350
5	(United Kingdom) Nigel Greensall		1					350
6	(United States) Lance Willsey			**1**				350
7	(United States) Anthony Lazzaro				**1**			350
8	(United States) Bob Iversen (United States) Terry Olson	3						300
9	(United States) Indy Al Miller		3					300
Pos.	Drivers	DAY	SEB	MOH	WGL	VIR	ATL	Points

=== Team's Championships ===
==== LMP3-1 ====
Pos.	Team	Car	DAY	SEB	MOH	WGL	VIR	ATL	Points
1	#54 MLT Motorsports	Ligier JS P320	2	3	3	1	2	5	1850
2	#21 Mühlner Motorsport America	Duqueine M30 - D08	**1**	**5**	**1**	**2**	**10**	**1**	1840
3	#7 VOLT Racing with Archangel	Ligier JS P320	14	1	7	7	4	2	1600
4	#6 Performance Tech Motorsports	Ligier JS P320	15	2	12	3	1	9	1540
5	#43 Robillard Racing	Duqueine M30 - D08	16	7	5	5	6	4	1440
6	#40 JDC MotorSports	Duqueine M30 - D08	3	8	4	13	8	10	1430
7	#3 Jr III Racing	Ligier JS P320	10	13	2	14	7	3	1420
8	#47 Forty7 Motorsports	Duqueine M30 - D08	11	14	11	6	13	7	1240
9	#34 Conquest Racing/JMF Motorsports	Duqueine M30 - D08	13	12	6	8	12	14	1210
10	#74 Forty7 Motorsports	Duqueine M30 - D08	9	16	10	9	11	11	1200
11	#33 Jr III Racing	Ligier JS P320	12	15		4	3	6	1180
12	#60 Wulver Racing	Ligier JS P320		11	8	12	9	8	1070
13	#46 CT Motorsports LLC	Duqueine M30 - D08	5	10	9	11		15	1050
14	#17 O'Gara Motorsport / USRT	Ligier JS P320				10	5	12	660
15	#1 WIN Autosport	Duqueine M30 - D08	7	4					520
16	#81 ONE Motorsports	Ligier JS P320	8	6					480
17	#11 WIN Autosport	Duqueine M30 - D08	6	9					470
18	#18 Andretti Autosport	Ligier JS P320	4	17					420
19	#22 Mühlner Motorsport America	Duqueine M30 - D08						13	180
20	#91 Riley Motorsports	Ligier JS P320			DNS				0
Pos.	Team	Car	DAY	SEB	MOH	WGL	VIR	ATL	Points

==== LMP3-2 ====
Pos.	Team	Car	DAY	SEB	MOH	WGL	VIR	ATL	Points
1	#61 Conquest Racing	Norma M30	2	**2**	2	2	2	2	1920
2	#24 Sean Creech Motorsport	Ligier JS P3		1	**1**	**1**			1050
3	#15 D Motorsports	Ligier JS P3					**1**	**1**	700
4	#86 ONE Motorsports	Ligier JS P3	3						300
5	#50 ONE Motorsports	Ligier JS P3		3					300
4	#60 Wulver Racing	Ligier JS P3	~~**1**~~						0
Pos.	Team	Car	DAY	SEB	MOH	WGL	VIR	ATL	Points

Note
#60 Wulver Racing after Round1 moved to LMP3-1 category.

=== Bronze Driver's Cup ===
==== LMP3-1 ====
Pos.	Drivers	DAY	SEB	MOH	WGL	VIR	ATL	Points
1	(United States) David Grant (United States) Keith Grant	1	1	2	2	1	1	2040
2	(Germany) Moritz Kranz			1	1			700
3	(United States) Steven Thomas	2	2					640
4	(United States) Indy Al Miller (United States) Mel Johnson	3						300
5	(United States) Ken D'Arcy (United States) Marc Sharinn				3			300
Pos.	Drivers	DAY	SEB	MOH	WGL	VIR	ATL	Points

==== LMP3-2 ====
Pos.	Drivers	DAY	SEB	MOH	WGL	VIR	ATL	Points
1	(Canada) Danny Kok (Canada) George Staikos	1	2	2	2	1	1	2010
2	(United States) Francesco Melandri		1	1	1			1050
3	(United Kingdom) Nigel Greensall		1					350
4	(United States) Lance Willsey			1				350
5	(United States) Anthony Lazzaro				1			350
6	(United States) Bob Iverson (United States) Terry Olson	2						320
7	(United States) Indy Al Miller		3					300
Pos.	Drivers	DAY	SEB	MOH	WGL	VIR	ATL	Points
