= 2022 IMSA Prototype Challenge =

Season of the IMSA Lites series

The 2022 IMSA Prototype Challenge was the seventeenth and final season of the IMSA Lites series and its successors, and the sixth under the IMSA Prototype Challenge name. The season started on January 21 at Daytona International Speedway and concluded on October 1 at Michelin Raceway Road Atlanta.

== Calendar ==
The provisional 2022 calendar was released on August 6, 2021, at IMSA's annual State of the Sport Address, featuring five rounds.

Round	Circuit	Location	Date	Duration
1	(United States) Daytona International Speedway	Daytona Beach, Florida	January 21–23	3 Hours
2	(United States) Mid-Ohio Sports Car Course	Lexington, Ohio	May 13–15	1 Hour 30 Minutes
3	(Canada) Canadian Tire Motorsport Park	Bowmanville, Ontario	July 1–3	1 Hour 30 Minutes
4	(United States) Virginia International Raceway	Alton, Virginia	August 26–28	1 Hour 30 Minutes
5	(United States) Michelin Raceway Road Atlanta	Braselton, Georgia	September 28–October 1	1 Hour 30 Minutes

Calendar Changes

- All races are now 1 hour 30 minutes in length, apart from the opening round at Daytona.
- Canadian Tire Motorsport Park (Mosport) returned to the calendar after being cancelled for 2020 and 2021 due to the COVID-19 pandemic.
- Sebring International Raceway did not return for 2022. Watkins Glen International, which served as the replacement for Canadian Tire Motorsport Park in 2021, also did not return to the schedule.

== Series News ==
- 2015-spec LMP3 machinery would no longer be permitted to compete from 2022 onwards, returning the series to a single class consisting entirely of 2020-spec machinery.

== Entry list ==
Team	Car	No.	Drivers	Class	Rounds
(United States) Jr III Racing	Ligier JS P320	3	(United States) Courtney Crone		All
(United States) Jr III Racing	Ligier JS P320	3	(United States) Terry Olson		1–2, 4–5
(United States) Jr III Racing	Ligier JS P320	3	(United States) Ari Balogh		3
(United States) Jr III Racing	Ligier JS P320	30	(United States) Ari Balogh	B	1–2, 4–5
(United States) Jr III Racing	Ligier JS P320	30	(United States) Thomas Merrill	B	2
(United States) Jr III Racing	Ligier JS P320	30	(United States) Nolan Siegel		5
(United States) CrowdStrike Racing by D Motorsports	Ligier JS P320	4	(United States) Jon Bennett	B	1
(United States) CrowdStrike Racing by D Motorsports	Ligier JS P320	4	(United States) George Kurtz	B	1
(United States) D Motorsports	Ligier JS P320	15	(Sweden) Niclas Jönsson		1
(United States) D Motorsports	Ligier JS P320	15	(United States) Mike Watt		1
(United States) Performance Tech Motorsports	Ligier JS P320	6	(Paraguay) Oscar Bitar		1–2, 4–5
(United States) Performance Tech Motorsports	Ligier JS P320	6	(United States) Dan Goldburg		1–2, 4–5
(United States) Performance Tech Motorsports	Ligier JS P320	7	(United States) Christopher Allen		4
(United States) Performance Tech Motorsports	Ligier JS P320	7	(United States) Robert Mau		4
(United States) JDC MotorSports	Duqueine M30 - D08	9	(United States) Gerry Kraut		2
(United States) JDC MotorSports	Duqueine M30 - D08	9	(South Africa) Stephen Simpson		2
(United States) JDC MotorSports	Duqueine M30 - D08	23	(Mexico) Memo Gidley		All
(United States) JDC MotorSports	Duqueine M30 - D08	23	(United States) Alexander Koreiba		All
(United States) JDC MotorSports	Duqueine M30 - D08	40	(United States) Keith Grant	B	All
(United States) JDC MotorSports	Duqueine M30 - D08	40	(United States) David Grant	B	1–2, 4–5
(United States) JDC MotorSports	Duqueine M30 - D08	40	(United States) Dakota Dickerson		3
(United States) JDC MotorSports	Duqueine M30 - D08	43	(United Kingdom) Stevan McAleer		1
(United States) JDC MotorSports	Duqueine M30 - D08	43	(United States) Joe Robillard		1
(United States) Sean Creech Motorsport	Ligier JS P320	14	(United States) Lance Willsey		1–3
(United States) Sean Creech Motorsport	Ligier JS P320	14	(United Kingdom) Sebastian Priaulx		1
(United States) Sean Creech Motorsport	Ligier JS P320	14	(Canada) Parker Thompson		2–3
(Canada) AWA	Duqueine M30 - D08	17	(Canada) Anthony Mantella	B	1–4
(Canada) AWA	Duqueine M30 - D08	17	(Canada) Orey Fidani	B	1
(Belgium) Mühlner Motorsports America	Duqueine M30 - D08	18	(Dominican Republic) Efrin Castro		1
(Belgium) Mühlner Motorsports America	Duqueine M30 - D08	18	(United States) Riley Dickinson		1
(Belgium) Mühlner Motorsports America	Duqueine M30 - D08	18	(United States) Mark Kvamme		2
(Belgium) Mühlner Motorsports America	Duqueine M30 - D08	18	(United States) Dillon Machavern		2
(Belgium) Mühlner Motorsports America	Duqueine M30 - D08	18	(Venezuela) Alex Popow		5
(Belgium) Mühlner Motorsports America	Duqueine M30 - D08	18	(Colombia) Óscar Tunjo		5
(Belgium) Mühlner Motorsports America	Duqueine M30 - D08	21	(United States) Bob Doyle		1
(Belgium) Mühlner Motorsports America	Duqueine M30 - D08	21	(Germany) Moritz Kranz		1
(United States) Ave Motorsports with GRS	Ligier JS P320	44	(United States) Tony Ave	B	1–3, 5
(United States) Ave Motorsports with GRS	Ligier JS P320	44	(Canada) Antoine Comeau	B	1
(United States) Ave Motorsports with GRS	Ligier JS P320	44	(United States) Josh Sarchet	B	4
(United States) Ave Motorsports with GRS	Ligier JS P320	44	(United States) Kaz Grala	B	4–5
(United States) Ave Motorsports with GRS	Ligier JS P320	61	(Canada) George Staikos		All
(United States) Ave Motorsports with GRS	Ligier JS P320	61	(United States) Hanna Zellers		All
(United States) CT Motorsports LLC	Duqueine M30 - D08	46	(United States) Steve Scullen		All
(United States) CT Motorsports LLC	Duqueine M30 - D08	46	(Costa Rica) Danny Formal		1–3
(United States) CT Motorsports LLC	Duqueine M30 - D08	46	(United States) Scott Huffaker		4–5
(United States) Forty7 Motorsports	Duqueine M30 - D08	47	(United States) Jon Brownson		1, 4–5
(United States) Forty7 Motorsports	Duqueine M30 - D08	47	(United States) Dario Cangialosi		1, 4–5
(United States) MLT Motorsports	Ligier JS P320	54	(United States) Dakota Dickerson		1
(United States) MLT Motorsports	Ligier JS P320	54	(United States) Josh Sarchet		1
(United States) MLT Motorsports	Ligier JS P320	54	(United States) Jason Rabe		2, 4–5
(United States) MLT Motorsports	Ligier JS P320	54	(United States) Tyler Maxson		2
(United States) MLT Motorsports	Ligier JS P320	54	(United States) Corey Lewis		4–5
(United States) Ophanim Motorsports	Ligier JS P320	57	(United States) John Saurino		1–2, 4–5
(United States) Ophanim Motorsports	Ligier JS P320	57	(United States) Josh Saurino		1–2
(United States) Ophanim Motorsports	Ligier JS P320	57	(United States) Nigel Saurino		4
(United States) Ophanim Motorsports	Ligier JS P320	57	(United States) Hans Saurino		5
(United States) Wulver Racing	Ligier JS P320	60	(Estonia) Tonis Kasemets	B	All
(United States) Wulver Racing	Ligier JS P320	60	(United States) Bruce Hamilton	B	1
(United States) CORE Autosport	Ligier JS P320	65	(United States) Jon Bennett	B	5
(United States) CORE Autosport	Ligier JS P320	65	(United States) George Kurtz	B	5
(United States) Riley Motorsports	Ligier JS P320	74	(United States) Shane Lewis		4
(United States) Riley Motorsports	Ligier JS P320	74	(United States) Gar Robinson		4
(United States) US RaceTronics	Ligier JS P320	77	(Finland) Patrick Kujala		All
(United States) US RaceTronics	Ligier JS P320	77	(United States) Brian Thienes		All

Icon	Class
B	Bronze Cup

== Race results ==
Rnd	Circuit	Pole position	Race winners
1	(United States) Daytona	(United States) No. 23 JDC MotorSports	(United States) No. 60 Wulver Racing
1	(United States) Daytona	(Mexico) Memo Gidley (United States) Alexander Koreiba	(United States) Bruce Hamilton (Estonia) Tonis Kasemets
2	(United States) Mid-Ohio	(United States) No. 23 JDC MotorSports	(United States) No. 23 JDC MotorSports
2	(United States) Mid-Ohio	(Mexico) Memo Gidley (United States) Alexander Koreiba	(Mexico) Memo Gidley (United States) Alexander Koreiba
3	(Canada) Mosport	(United States) No. 60 Wulver Racing	(United States) No. 60 Wulver Racing
3	(Canada) Mosport	(Estonia) Tonis Kasemets	(Estonia) Tonis Kasemets
4	(United States) Virginia	(United States) No. 60 Wulver Racing	(United States) No. 60 Wulver Racing
4	(United States) Virginia	(Estonia) Tonis Kasemets	(Estonia) Tonis Kasemets
5	(United States) Road Atlanta	(United States) No. 60 Wulver Racing	(United States) No. 60 Wulver Racing
5	(United States) Road Atlanta	(Estonia) Tonis Kasemets	(Estonia) Tonis Kasemets

== Championship standings ==
=== Points system ===
Championship points are awarded in each class at the finish of each event. Points are awarded based on finishing positions in the race as shown in the chart below.

Position	1	2	3	4	5	6	7	8	9	10	11	12	13	14	15	16	17	18	19	20	21	22	23	24	25	26	27	28	29	30+
Race	350	320	300	280	260	250	240	230	220	210	200	190	180	170	160	150	140	130	120	110	100	90	80	70	60	50	40	30	20	10

=== Driver's Championship ===
Pos.	Drivers	DAY (United States)	MOH (United States)	MOS (Canada)	VIR (United States)	ATL (United States)	Points
1	(Estonia) Tonis Kasemets	1	2	**1**	**1**	**1**	1720
2	(Mexico) Memo Gidley (United States) Alexander Koreiba	**3**	**1**	5	2	2	1550
3	(Finland) Patrick Kujala (United States) Brian Thienes	2	4	10^{†}	3	4	1390
4	(United States) Ari Balogh	9	3	6	5	9	1250
5	(United States) Keith Grant	10	5	4	10	6	1210
6	(United States) Courtney Crone	5	9	6	12	12	1110
7	(United States) Steve Scullen	8	14	8	11	8	1060
8	(Canada) Anthony Mantella	13	6	3	9		950
9	(United States) David Grant	10	5		10	6	930
10	(Canada) George Staikos (United States) Hanna Zellers	17	11	7	16	11	930
11	(United States) Terry Olson	5	9		12	12	860
12	(United States) Tony Ave	12	15	9		5	830
13	(Paraguay) Oscar Bitar (United States) Dan Goldburg	18	7		6	10	830
14	(United States) Lance Willsey	6	8	2			800
15	(United States) John Saurino	14	12		15	13	700
16	(United States) Jon Brownson (United States) Dario Cangialosi	4			7	14	690
17	(United States) Jason Rabe		16^{†}		13	3	630
18	(Costa Rica) Danny Formal	8	14	8			630
19	(Canada) Parker Thompson		8	2			550
20	(United States) Corey Lewis				13	3	480
21	(United States) Dakota Dickerson	11		4			480
22	(United States) Kaz Grala				14	5	430
23	(United States) Scott Huffaker				11	8	430
24	(United States) Josh Sarchet	11			14		370
25	(United States) Josh Saurino	14	12				360
26	(United States) Bruce Hamilton	1					350
27	(United States) Thomas Merrill		3				300
28	(United States) Shane Lewis (United States) Gar Robinson				4		280
29	(United Kingdom) Sebastian Priaulx	6					250
30	(Sweden) Niclas Jönsson (United States) Mike Watt	7					240
31	(Venezuela) Alex Popow (Colombia) Óscar Tunjo					7	240
32	(United States) Christopher Allen (United States) Robert Mau				8		230
33	(United States) Nolan Siegel					9	220
34	(United States) Mark Kvamme (United States) Dillon Machavern		10				210
35	(Canada) Antoine Comeau	12					190
36	(Canada) Orey Fidani	13					180
37	(United States) Gerry Kraut (South Africa) Stephen Simpson		13				180
38	(United States) Hans Saurino					13	180
39	(Dominican Republic) Efrin Castro (United States) Riley Dickinson	15					160
40	(United States) Nigel Saurino				15		160
41	(United Kingdom) Stevan McAleer (United States) Joe Robillard	16					150
42	(United States) Tyler Maxson		16^{†}				150
43	(United States) Jon Bennett (United States) George Kurtz	19^{†}				DNS	120
44	(United States) Bob Doyle (Germany) Moritz Kranz	DNS					0
Pos.	Drivers	DAY (United States)	MOH (United States)	MOS (Canada)	VIR (United States)	ATL (United States)	Points

Colour	Result
Gold	Winner
Silver	Second place
Bronze	Third place
Green	Points classification
Blue	Non-points classification
Blue	Non-classified finish (NC)
Purple	Retired, not classified (Ret)
Red	Did not qualify (DNQ)
Red	Did not pre-qualify (DNPQ)
Black	Disqualified (DSQ)
White	Did not start (DNS)
White	Withdrew (WD)
White	Race cancelled (C)
Blank	Did not practice (DNP)
Blank	Did not arrive (DNA)
Blank	Excluded (EX)

**Bold** - Pole position

Italics - Fastest lap

†: Post-event penalty. Car moved to back of class.

=== Bronze Driver's Cup ===
Pos.	Drivers	DAY (United States)	MOH (United States)	MOS (Canada)	VIR (United States)	ATL (United States)	Points
1	(Estonia) Tonis Kasemets	1	1	1	1	1	1750
2	(United States) David Grant (United States) Keith Grant	3	3		4	2	1200
3	(Canada) Anthony Mantella	5	4	2	3		1160
4	(United States) Ari Balogh	2	2		2		960
5	(United States) Tony Ave	4	5	3			840
6	(United States) Bruce Hamilton	1					350
7	(United States) Thomas Merrill		2				320
8	(Canada) Antoine Comeau	4					280
9	(Canada) Orey Fidani	5					260
10	(United States) Jon Bennett (United States) George Kurtz	6^{†}				DNS	250
Pos.	Drivers	DAY (United States)	MOH (United States)	MOS (Canada)	VIR (United States)	ATL (United States)	Points

†: Post-event penalty. Car moved to back of class.

=== Team's Championship ===
Pos.	Drivers	DAY (United States)	MOH (United States)	MOS (Canada)	VIR (United States)	ATL (United States)	Points
1	(United States) #60 Wulver Racing	1	2	**1**	**1**	**1**	1720
2	(United States) #23 JDC MotorSports	**3**	**1**	5	2	2	1550
3	(United States) #77 US RaceTronics	2	4	10^{†}	3	4	1390
4	(United States) #40 JDC MotorSports	10	5	4	10	6	1210
5	(United States) #3 Jr III Racing	5	9	6	12	12	1110
6	(United States) #46 CT Motorsports LLC	8	14	8	11	8	1060
7	(United States) #30 Jr III Racing	9	3		5	9	1000
8	(United States) #44 Ave Motorsports with GRS	12	15	9	14	5	1000
9	(Canada) #17 AWA	13	6	3	9		950
10	(United States) #61 Ave Motorsports with GRS	17	11	7	16	11	930
11	(United States) #54 MLT Motorsports	11	16^{†}		13	3	830
12	(United States) #6 Performance Tech Motorsports	18	7		6	10	830
13	(United States) #14 Sean Creech Motorsport	6	8	2			800
14	(United States) #57 Ophanim Motorsports	14	12		15	13	700
15	(United States) #47 Forty7 Motorsports	4			7	14	690
16	(Belgium) #18 Mühlner Motorsports America	15	10			7	610
17	(United States) #74 Riley Motorsports				4		280
18	(United States) #15 D Motorsports	7					240
19	(United States) #7 Performance Tech Motorsports				8		230
20	(United States) #9 JDC MotorSports		13				180
21	(United States) #43 JDC MotorSports	16					150
22	(United States) #4 CrowdStrike Racing by D Motorsports	19^{†}					120
23	(United States) #65 CORE Autosport					DNS	0
24	(Belgium) #21 Mühlner Motorsports America	DNS					0
Pos.	Drivers	DAY (United States)	MOH (United States)	MOS (Canada)	VIR (United States)	ATL (United States)	Points

†: Post-event penalty. Car moved to back of class.
